= Fred Figglehorn =

Character from the YouTube web series Fred

- Fred character
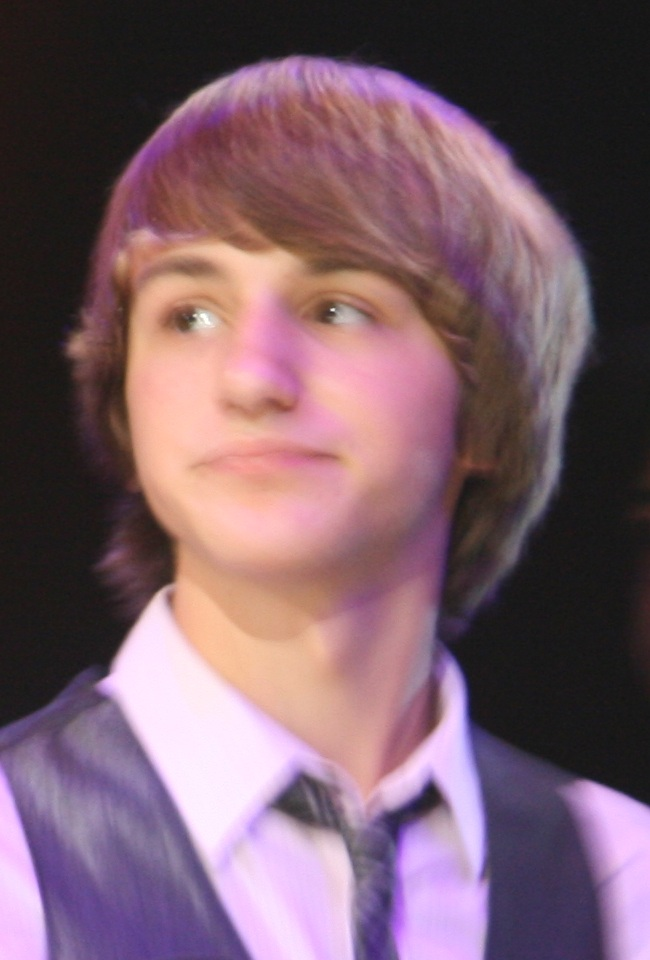
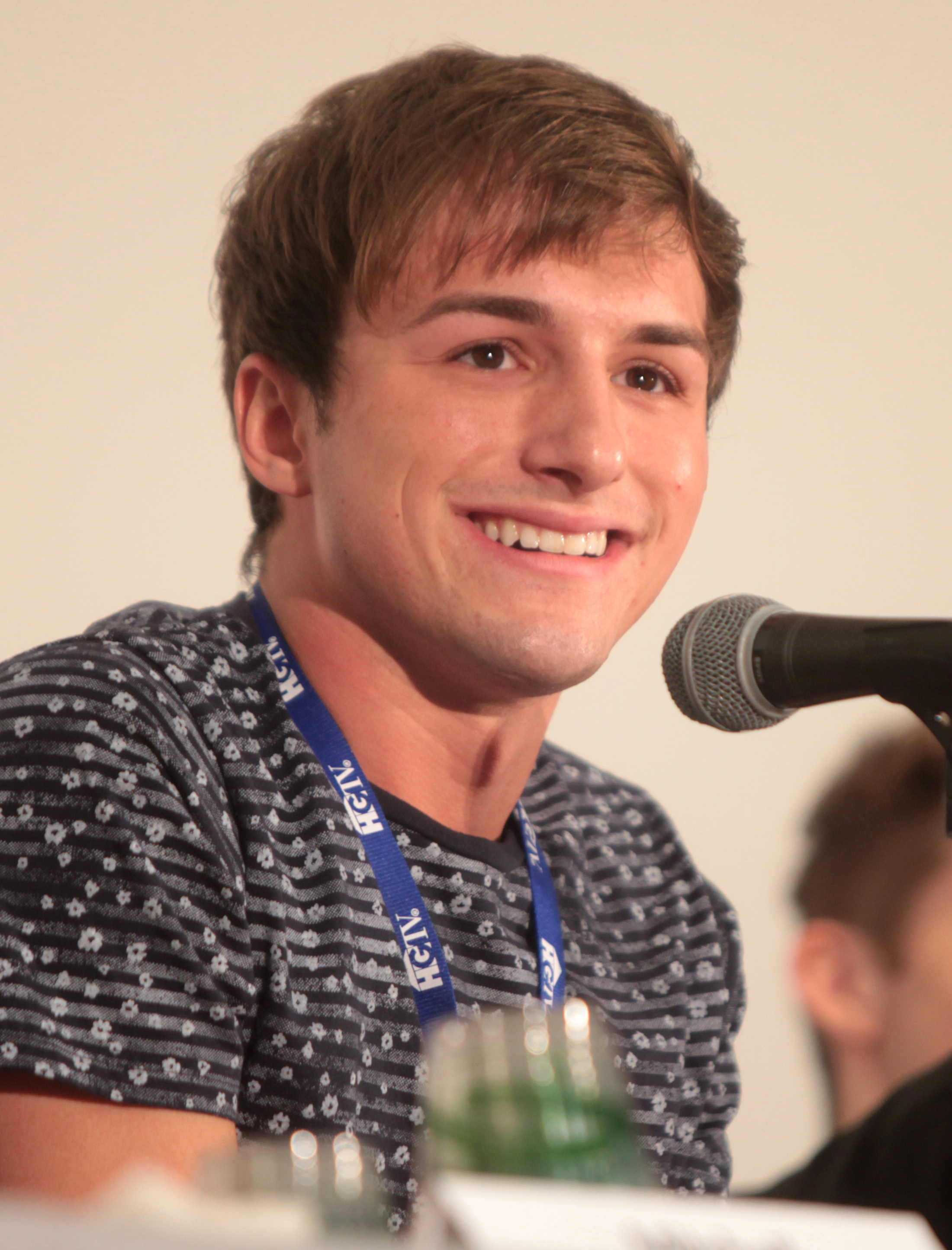
- Left: Figglehorn in 2008; Right: Figglehorn in 2014
- First appearance: Fred on Halloween (2006)
- Last appearance: The Haunted Mirror (2025)
- Created by: Lucas Cruikshank
- Portrayed by: Lucas Cruikshank; Jack Coughlan (young; film series)
- Voiced by: Lucas Cruikshank

In-universe information
- Occupation: Student
- Nationality: American
- Catchphrase: Hey, it's Fred!
- Age: 6 years (YouTube); 15 years (Nickelodeon)

Frederick Figglehorn is a character who appears in the YouTube web series Fred (stylized as "FЯED") created by American Internet personality Lucas Cruikshank from 2006 to 2014 and revived from 2020 to 2021. The characters' initial popularity yielded other spin-off series and a media franchise with Nickelodeon, including three feature films and a television series.

== History ==
Lucas Cruikshank introduced the Fred character in a video on JKL Productions, a channel he started on YouTube with his cousins, Jon and Katie Smet on June 11, 2006. Cruikshank uploaded several videos testing out different characters. The first Fred video was uploaded on October 30, 2006, and a few more videos were uploaded throughout 2007. On April 30, 2008, these videos were moved to the Fred (often stylized as FЯED) channel, and on May 1 the first official video of the series, titled "Fred on May Day" was released. By April 2009, it became the first YouTube channel to have over one million subscribers.

Zipit Wireless Messenger (Z2) sponsored the first season of Fred, with several product placements. Walden Media hired Cruikshank to promote the film City of Ember, along with the sci-fi novel it was based on, cameos from the film's star Tim Robbins in Fred episodes, and a mock movie trailer.

Cruikshank made a cameo appearance as both Fred and himself on Nickelodeon's iCarly in "iMeet Fred", which originally aired on February 16, 2009. The episode has iCarly facing a huge loss of popularity after Freddie Benson criticizes Fred on-air, resulting in Cruikshank pretending to cancel his own show, and the characters organizing a crossover episode between the two web shows to regain popularity.

In December 2009, Cruikshank filmed Fred: The Movie, which aired on Nickelodeon on September 18, 2010. Nickelodeon created a franchise surrounding the character, with the sequel, Fred 2: Night of the Living Fred, airing on October 22, 2011. In 2012, Fred: The Show aired, consisting of 24 11-minute episodes; a third movie, Fred 3: Camp Fred, premiered that year.

In June 2010, Fred appeared on the Annoying Orange web series. In October and November 2011, Ari Gold cameos in Fred as Power, from the film Adventures of Power. Fred also made a crossover video with Annoying Orange called "Fred Goes Grocery Shopping feat. Annoying Orange" in June 2010, which has gotten over 96 million views as of March 2026. However, the grocery store the Fred went to in the video (Joe and Al's Your Family Grocery) closed down sometime in 2011, and now the local store is mostly known due to the viral YouTube video.

Leading up to the second films' release, a new series Figgle Chat premiered on the channel in which Fred interviewed various stars such as Alphacat, Wilmer Valderrama, and iJustine among others. Additionally, an animated series titled, It's Fred!, joined the channel. Each episode followed Fred's various schemes to win Judy's affection while attending School. While unrelated to the film series, Jake Weary reprised his role as Kevin. Both series ended in 2011 and 2012 respectively.

The last video in the Fred franchise was an appearance by Cruikshank in the video “Lucas Defeats Yuksung”, an episode of “The New Fred”. Cruikshank made one final appearance in a promo for the new era of the channel in which users could send in their own videos before selling off the channel, making few appearances from then on. The channel made its final upload in 2015.

In 2020, Cruikshank created a TikTok channel based on Fred named HeyItsFred, reviving the character, although it has been inactive since 2021.

== Web series ==
Fred
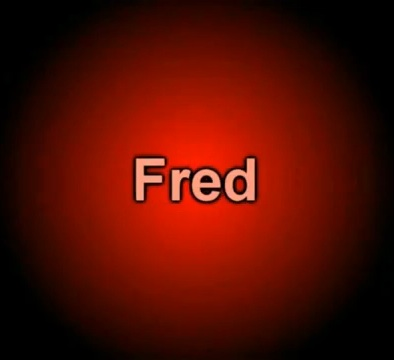
- Title card
- Genre: Comedy
- Created by: Lucas Cruikshank
- Written by: Lucas Cruikshank
- Starring: Lucas Cruikshank
- Country of origin: United States
- Original language: English
- No. of seasons: 4
- No. of episodes: 48

Production
- Production location: Columbus, Nebraska
- Editor: Lucas Cruikshank
- Production companies: The Collective; Varsity Pictures (2007–2011)

Original release
- Network: JKL Productions (pre-series); Fred (seasons 1–5); YouTube
- Release: October 30, 2006 – February 23, 2011

Related
- Figgle Chat; It's Fred; Fred: The Movie; Fred 2: Night of the Living Fred; Fred: The Show; Fred 3: Camp Fred

Fred (often stylized as FЯED) is a web series created and portrayed by Lucas Cruikshank. The series follows Fred Figglehorn, a six-year-old boy who lives with his mother who is a recovering drug-addict, and as a result, has been the victim of child abuse. His father, a former rock musician, is awaiting execution in the state penitentiary. Fred requires medication to behave like a "normal kid", and it is implied that he will die if he does not take it. In the video "Fred's Mom is Missing", Fred discovers that his mom is suddenly gone, prompting his grandma to move in and watch over him until she returns. Fred's mom would eventually return to the series, having gone to rehab, two months later in "Fred's Mom Returns".

The series uses a floating timeline, meaning it is always taking place in the current year, and Fred is perpetually six years old and in kindergarten. The videos primarily consist of the character speaking to the audience about what is happening in his life. Fred has a high-pitched voice and is hyperactive, achieved by speeding up the footage. Cruikshank has described the channel as "programming for kids by kids" as a parody of people who "think that everyone is so interested in them". He believes that viewers either "automatically love Fred or automatically hate Fred, there is no in-between".

Fred is the only major character physically seen in the series. In the event that Fred ever interacted with another person, Cruikshank would voice them off-screen. Some of the characters included Kevin, a bully in his neighborhood who he frequently describes as overweight; Judy, a snobbish girl that he has a crush on despite being in a relationship with Kevin; his Mom and Dad; Bertha, a local girl who he is friends with; and his Grandma. In 2010, the format of the videos changed in which Fred filmed in a public environment and interacted with other people that weren't portrayed by Cruikshank. Some notable guests during this time included Annoying Orange and Weezer.

An arc that persisted through the series was a feud that Fred had with the original owner of his YouTube channel. In the episode "Fred on May Day", Fred stated that he acquired his YouTube channel by pestering their HQ. In subsequent videos, Fred would update his viewers with messages he would be receiving from the original channel owner, in which they threatened to hurt him and that they knew his location. This would culminate with the episode "Fred Gets Kidnapped by Claudio" in which a man named Claudio Gregory (also portrayed by Cruikshank), imprisons Fred in a Dog crate while he temporarily took over the channel. In the episode "Lucas Defeats Yuksung", it is revealed that Claudio was the original channel owner, and as an act of revenge towards Fred for stealing his fame, he partnered with Yuksang to produce Fred videos worse than the originals so the channel would lose its popularity. However, he reforms after Fred and Lucas offer to be his friend.

== Discography ==
=== Albums ===
List of albums, with details and chart positions
| Title | Album details | Peak chart positions | |
| Title | Album details | US Comedy | US Heat |
|---|---|---|---|
| Who's Ready to Party? | Released: September 17, 2010 (United States); Labels: Collective Records; Formats: Digital download, compact disc | 1 | 29 |

=== Extended plays ===
List of albums, with details and chart positions
| Title | Album details | Peak chart positions | | |
| Title | Album details | US Comedy | US Heat | US Holiday |
|---|---|---|---|---|
| It's Hackin' Christmas with Fred | Released: November 10, 2009 (United States); Label: Self-released; Formats: Digital download | 8 | 24 | 13 |

=== Charted songs ===
List of charted songs, with peak positions
| Title | Year | Peak positions | | Album |
| Title | Year | US Comedy | US Holiday | Album |
|---|---|---|---|---|
| "Christmas Cash" | 2009 | 22 | 5 | It's Hackin' Christmas with Fred |
| "Christmas is Creepy" | 2009 | 9 | 1 | It's Hackin' Christmas with Fred |
| "Fred's 12 Days of Christmas" | 2009 | – | 28 | It's Hackin' Christmas with Fred |
| "I Wanna Be a Celebrity" | 2010 | 11 | – | Who's Ready to Party |
"—" denotes the song did not chart.

== Films ==
=== Fred: The Movie ===
Fred: The Movie is a 2010 film based on the YouTube series about Fred Figglehorn. It features Lucas Cruikshank as Fred, Pixie Lott as Judy, Jennette McCurdy as Bertha, Jake Weary as Kevin Cen, John Cena as Fred's imaginary dad, and Siobhan Fallon Hogan as Fred's mom. It follows the character as he tries to track down his crush, Judy after she moves away. It is written by David A. Goodman, directed by Clay Weiner, and produced by Brian Robbins. Filming began November 9, 2009, and wrapped up December 20, 2009. The movie premiered on Nickelodeon on September 18, 2010, and the DVD was released October 5, 2010 as well as streaming media such as Netflix.

=== Fred 2: Night of the Living Fred ===
Fred 2: Night of the Living Fred is a 2011 Halloween-themed sequel to Fred: The Movie. It first aired on October 22, 2011. After Fred has broken up with Judy, he meets Kevin Cen's sister Talia, and becomes convinced that his new neighbor is a vampire. The Judy character does not appear, and Jennette McCurdy was replaced by Daniella Monet in the role of Bertha.

=== Fred 3: Camp Fred ===
In late 2011, a third Fred movie was announced. Fred 3: Camp Fred premiered July 28, 2012, on Nickelodeon, which also aired Fred: The Show, a series of 24 11-minute-long episodes, in 2012. For summer, Fred attends Camp Iwannapeepee, where he meets several different characters, and must compete against Kevin Cen's camp.

== TV series ==
=== Fred: The Show ===
In 2012, Fred became the protagonist in his own TV series, which ran between January and August 2012. The series received dismal reviews, particularly for Fred's childish attitude and annoying voice, and ratings continued to plummet until the show was axed, after which Cruikshank severed ties with Nickelodeon, and Fred was retired.

Achievements
| Preceded by nigahiga | Most Subscribed Channel on YouTube; 2008–2009 | Succeeded by nigahiga |
