= Fred: The Show =

2012 American comedy television series

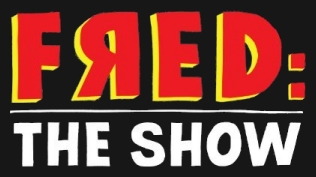
- Also known as: FЯED: THE SHOW
- Genre: Comedy; Teen Sitcom; Slapstick
- Created by: Lucas Cruikshank
- Based on: Fred by Lucas Cruikshank
- Starring: Lucas Cruikshank; Jake Weary; Siobhan Fallon Hogan; Daniella Monet; Stephanie Courtney
- Composer: Roddy Bottum
- Country of origin: United States
- Original language: English
- No. of seasons: 1
- No. of episodes: 24

Production
- Executive producers: Lucas Cruikshank; Brian Robbins; Sharla Sumpter Bridgett; Michael Green; Gary Binkow; Evan Weiss
- Producers: Don Dunn; Sheryl Levine; Carter Hansen
- Running time: 11 minutes
- Production companies: Varsity Pictures; The Collective

Original release
- Network: Nickelodeon
- Release: January 16 – August 3, 2012

Fred: The Show (stylized as FЯED: THE SHOW) is an American comedy television series, created by Lucas Cruikshank that originally aired on Nickelodeon in the United States from January 16 to August 3, 2012. Lucas Cruikshank, Daniella Monet, Jake Weary, Siobhan Fallon Hogan, and Stephanie Courtney reprise their roles from Fred: The Movie and Fred 2: Night of the Living Fred. A series preview aired on January 16, 2012, and the show officially premiered on February 5, 2012. Fred: The Show came to production after the success of Night of the Living Fred. The show was cancelled after one season.

== Synopsis ==
The show follows the adventures of Fred Figglehorn (Lucas Cruikshank), aged 16 years old, in his daily life with crazy schemes and adventures.

== Cast ==
=== Main ===
- Lucas Cruikshank as Fred Figglehorn / Derf / Fredo / Evil Fred / Bagel Fredrick
- Jake Weary as Kevin Lebow
- Siobhan Fallon Hogan as Hilda Figglehorn (Fred's Mom) / Fred's Grandmother
- Daniella Monet as Bertha Friendofred
- Stephanie Courtney as Janet Lebow

=== Recurring ===
- Carlos Knight as Diesel
- Rachel Crow as Starr
- Pat Crawford Brown as Mrs. Haberstan
- Ryan Potter as Bryan: Fred's Best Friend
- Gracie Dzienny as Holly

== Episodes ==
No.	Title	Directed by	Written by	Original release date	Prod. code	U.S. viewers (millions)
1	"Love Potion"	Jonathan Judge	Lanny Horn & Josh Silverstein	January 16, 2012	101	3.69
Fred develops a crush on the new student Nicolette, so he makes a love potion for his science fair project, but when he tries to spray Nicolette, Kevin gets in the way! Guest star: Kate Brochu as Nicolette Note: This episode was shown as a special preview.
2	"Evil Fred, Part 1"	Jonathan Judge	Drew Hancock	February 20, 2012	105	3.12
The neighbors have witnessed Fred committing petty crimes. As Fred declares his innocence, nobody believes him. Absent: Daniella Monet as Bertha
3	"Evil Fred, Part 2"	Jonathan Judge	Drew Hancock	February 20, 2012	106	3.12
Nobody believes that Fred is innocent, and Fred thinks that there is an evil Fred running around. He then sees Kevin doing bad things dressed like him, and he suspects evil Fred is Kevin. He then tries to get even with Kevin by doing good things dressed like Kevin. Absent: Daniella Monet as Bertha
4	"Fred the Teen Sitter"	Jonathan Judge	Josh Herman & Adam Schwartz	February 24, 2012	103	2.38
Fred babysits Kevin due to Mrs. Dawg telling Kevin he can't stay home alone after throwing a party, and Fred has no experience and learns how to, all thanks to the book "How to be a Good Babysitter for Kids of All Ages". Absent: Daniella Monet as Bertha and Siobhan Fallon Hogan as Fred's Mom
5	"The Expired Cow"	Jonathan Judge	Drew Hancock	February 24, 2012	102	2.38
Fred drinks expired milk and hallucinates that a cow is trying to destroy his cake for Home Ec. Will Fred survive the clutches of the evil Expired Cow? Absent: Jake Weary as Kevin, Siobhan Fallon Hogan as Fred's Mom and Stephanie Courtney as Kevin's Mom Guest star: Shayne Topp as Steve the Talking Cookie
6	"Driver's Fred"	Dave Payne	Lanny Horn & Josh Sliverstein	March 2, 2012	104	2.36
Kevin is taking a Driver's Ed test, so he can get a driver's license, Fred wants to get a driver's license by driving but then a bank robber poses as Fred's driving instructor and Fred is forced to help him steal money. Absent: Daniella Monet as Bertha and Stephanie Courtney as Kevin's Mom
7	"Lemon Fred"	Dave Payne	Jimmy Hibbert	March 2, 2012	107	2.36
Fred wants a scooter, but he doesn't have enough money, so he decides to open up a lemonade stand called Lemon Fred and creates a lemonade called the Lemon Wallop. Guest star: Dillon Lane as Fred's employee Absent: Daniella Monet as Bertha, Jake Weary as Kevin and Stephanie Courtney as Kevin's Mom
8	"Fred and the Scary Movie"	Jonathan Judge	Josh Herman & Adam Schwartz	March 9, 2012	108	1.64
Fred invites the baddest girl in school over to watch a scary movie (which he stole from Kevin) hoping to convince her that he's a rebel. Guest star: Gracie Dzienny as Holly Absent: Daniella Monet as Bertha and Stephanie Courtney as Kevin's Mom
9	"Best Freds Forever"	Jonathan Judge	Ed Bedrosian	March 16, 2012	109	2.00
Fred finds old pictures of Kevin and himself, as best friends. Fred then makes Kevin become his B.F.F., or else, he'll blackmail Kevin. After Fred tosses the photos, Kevin gets laughed at in school. Guest star: Ryan Potter as Bryan, Fred's Best Friend Absent: Daniella Monet as Bertha, Siobhan Fallon Hogan as Fred's Mom and Stephanie Courtney as Kevin's Mom
10	"Six Degrees of Kevin's Bacon"	Jonathan Judge	Anthony Q. Farrell	March 31, 2012	110	N/A
Fred assists Kevin after injuring him with balloons full of pudding. But turns out Kevin was faking the whole time and Fred gets revenge on Kevin by gluing him to his wheelchair and eating his ice cream sundae in front of him. Note: This episode was the first episode to premiere on a Saturday and it aired before the 2012 Kids Choice Awards. Also this is the first episode to include a character's name other than Fred's name. Last appearance: Stephanie Courtney as Kevin's Mom Absent: Daniella Monet as Bertha and Siobhan Fallon Hogan as Fred's Mom
11	"The Tutor"	Dave Payne	Lanny Horn & Josh Silverstein	March 31, 2012	111	N/A
Fred suspects that his tutor, Eloise, is a Russian spy and exposing this info trumps passing his test. Guest star: Reggie Brown as Barack Obama Absent: Daniella Monet as Bertha, Jake Weary as Kevin, Siobhan Fallon Hogan as Fred's Mom and Stephanie Courtney as Kevin's Mom Note: The episode was originally called "Spy Day".
12	"Class Election, Part 1"	Jonathan Judge	Lanny Horn & Josh Silverstein	April 6, 2012	114	1.69
Fred runs against Kevin in a class election, which takes a nasty turn when negative attacks are made. Special Guest star: Rachel Crow as Starr and Carlos Knight as Diesel Kevin's campaign manager. Absent: Daniella Monet as Bertha, Siobhan Fallon Hogan as Fred's Mom and Stephanie Courtney as Kevin's Mom
13	"Class Election, Part 2"	Jonathan Judge	Lanny Horn & Josh Silverstein	April 13, 2012	115	1.93
Fred and Kevin find out that Starr has been bribing people to vote for her and they join forces to make her lose the election. Absent: Daniella Monet as Bertha, Siobhan Fallon Hogan as Fred's Mom and Stephanie Courtney as Kevin's Mom
14	"Fred's All-Nighter"	Dave Payne	Dave Ihlenfeld & David Wright	April 23, 2012	112	N/A
Fred has to pull an all nighter so he can study for a history test he has forgotten about. As he's studying, he has trouble staying awake. Guest star: Ryan Potter as Bryan, Fred's Best Friend; Note: This was the first episode to premiere on a Monday, promoting the "Greatest Hackin' Awesome Week Ever"! Absent: Daniella Monet as Bertha, Jake Weary as Kevin, Siobhan Fallon Hogan as Fred's Mom and Stephanie Courtney as Kevin's Mom
15	"UltraMomma"	Dave Payne	Lanny Horn & Josh Silverstein	April 24, 2012	113	N/A
Fred's mother calls reality tv star Ultramom to whip him into shape. Absent: Daniella Monet as Bertha, Jake Weary as Kevin and Stephanie Courtney as Kevin's Mom
16	"Flour Baby"	Jonathan Judge	Laura House	April 25, 2012	116	N/A
Fred and Starr team up for a school assignment, which requires them to look after a sack of flour and treat it like a baby. Absent: Daniella Monet as Bertha, Siobhan Fallon Hogan as Fred's Mom and Stephanie Courtney as Kevin's Mom
17	"No Clue"	Dave Payne	Josh Herman & Adam Schwartz	April 26, 2012	117	N/A
Fred tries to figure out what happened when he finds the class gerbil is dead along with the class goldfish. It's a mystery only Fred can solve! But is Fred smart enough to crack the case? Absent: Siobhan Fallon Hogan as Fred's Mom and Stephanie Courtney as Kevin's Mom
18	"The Battle of Little Figglehorn"	Dave Payne	Chuck Hayward	April 27, 2012	118	N/A
When Fred realizes that he's moving to Alaska, he does everything he can to make his last day the most awesome one, including a fight with Kevin..... Note: After this episode, new episodes stopped airing for a while due to the filming of Fred 3: Camp Fred. This is also the only episode that Nick didn't put on the Internet after it airs. Absent: Stephanie Courtney as Kevin's Mom
19	"Fred Gets a Pet"	Dave Payne	Dave Ihlenfeld & David Wright	July 30, 2012	119	N/A
Fred offers a reward for his missing pet, a housefly. But turns out Kevin found him and killed him as he gives Kevin the reward, anyway. As Fred sets up a funeral for Flapper as it turns out he isn't dead as Fred gets his money back from Kevin after Flapper attacks him. Last appearance: Daniella Monet as Bertha Absent: Siobhan Fallon Hogan as Fred's Mom and Stephanie Courtney as Kevin's Mom
20	"A Visit From Grandma"	Lance W. Lanfear	Amy Engelberg & Wendy Engelberg	July 31, 2012	120	2.85
It's Fred's Grandma's birthday but soon Grandma goes missing. Fred disguises himself as his grandmother so nobody knows she's gone. Last appearance: Siobhan Fallon Hogan as Fred's Mom Absent: Daniella Monet as Bertha, Jake Weary as Kevin and Stephanie Courtney as Kevin's Mom
21	"Fred Gets Trapped"	Lance W. Lanfear	Dave Ihlenfeld & David Wright	August 1, 2012	121	N/A
Fred and Holly get themselves trapped in his basement and try to find a way out. Absent: Daniella Monet as Bertha, Siobhan Fallon Hogan as Fred's Mom and Stephanie Courtney as Kevin's Mom
22	"Spirit of the 90's"	Lance W. Lanfear	Laura House	August 2, 2012	122	2.64
Fred worries about his school's 1990s-themed dance because he's unfamiliar with the decade, and then he has a dream where he's transported to the 1990s. Absent: Daniella Monet as Bertha, Siobhan Fallon Hogan as Fred's Mom and Stephanie Courtney as Kevin's Mom
23	"Freddy and The Figglettes, Part 1"	Dave Payne	Lanny Horn & Josh Silverstein	August 3, 2012	123	2.34
A music producer recruits Fred to star in a music video and makes him big promises. However, Starr is suspicious about her... Absent: Daniella Monet as Bertha, Jake Weary as Kevin, Siobhan Fallon Hogan as Fred's Mom and Stephanie Courtney as Kevin's Mom
24	"Freddy and The Figglettes, Part 2"	Dave Payne	Lanny Horn & Josh Silverstein	August 3, 2012	124	2.34
When Fred realizes that his music video really does stink, he tries to make it up to his friend, Starr, when he didn't believe her. Absent: Daniella Monet as Bertha, Siobhan Fallon Hogan as Fred's Mom and Stephanie Courtney as Kevin's Mom

== Broadcast ==
Fred: The Show premiered on January 16, 2012, in the United States. The show first began showing in Canada on September 3, 2012. In Australia the premiere was on August 17, 2012. The program premiered in the United Kingdom and Ireland on August 12, 2012, on Nickelodeon. It also aired on VIVA in April 2013.

== Reception ==
Fred: The Show was critically panned for its character dialogue and humor. Common Sense Media gave the show 1 out of 5 stars and stated that Fred: The Show had "More of the same absurdity from obnoxious YouTube star." The show attracted 3.7 million viewers with a sneak peek that aired on January 16. A month later, the series premiered with 3.1 million viewers (a 16% drop) Viewership dropped a further 23% to 2.4 million for the show's second episode - which aired four days later.
