= Lucas Cruikshank =

American YouTuber (born 1993)

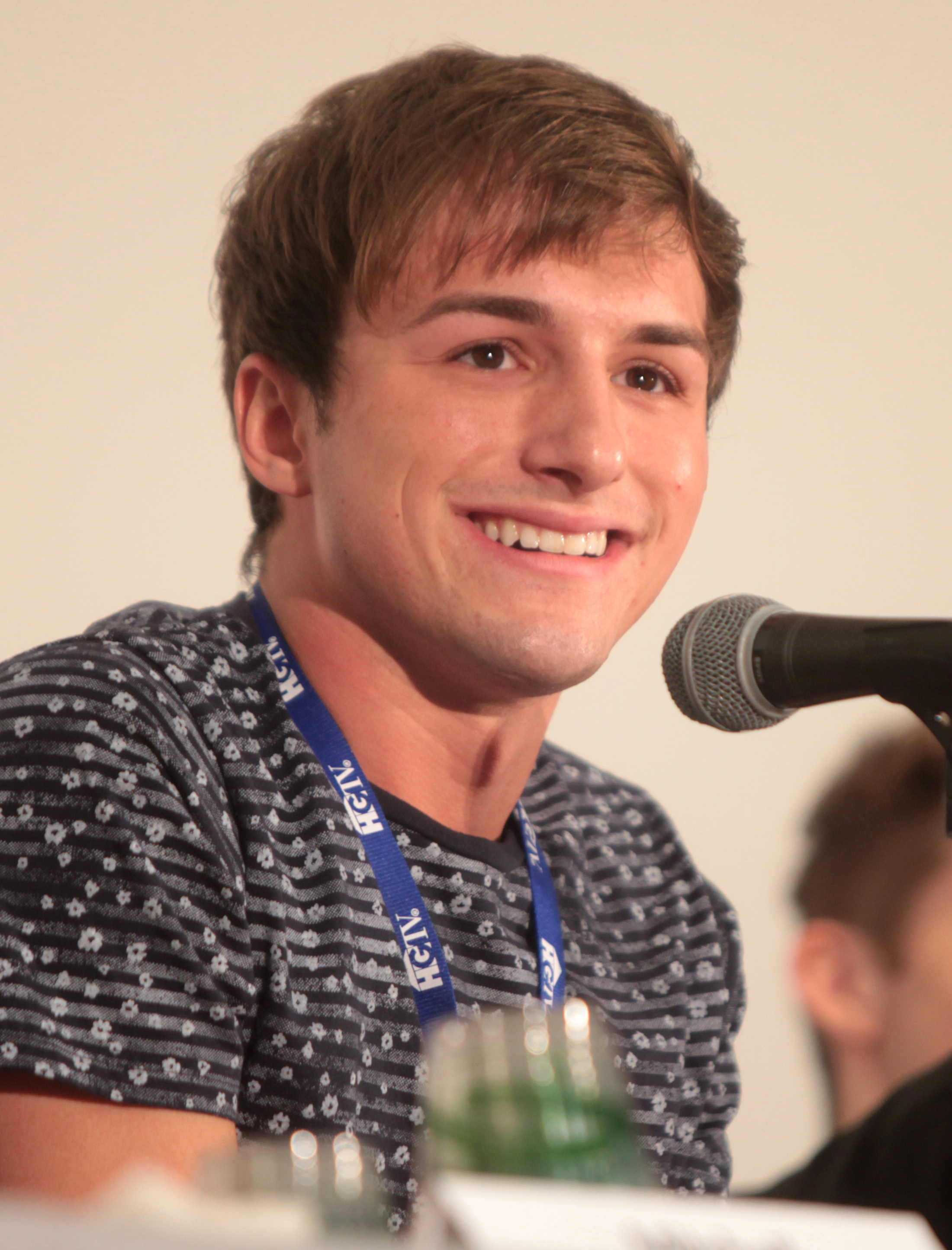
- Cruikshank in 2014
- Born: Lucas Alan Cruikshank; August 29, 1993 (age 33); Columbus, Nebraska, U.S.
- Occupations: YouTuber; actor
- Years active: 2006–present
- Spouse: Matthew Fawcus

YouTube information
- Channel: Lucas
- Genres: Comedy; skit; vlogging
- Subscribers: 3.34 million
- Views: 237 million
- Last updated: October 31, 2026
- Website: www.heyitsfred.com

Lucas Alan Cruikshank (born August 29, 1993) is an American YouTuber and actor who created and portrayed the character Fred Figglehorn and the associated Fred series for his channel on the video-hosting website YouTube in late 2006. These videos are centered on Fred Figglehorn, a fictional six-year-old who has a dysfunctional home life and "anger management issues".

== Early life ==
Lucas Alan Cruikshank was born on August 29, 1993, and raised in Columbus, Nebraska, where he attended Lakeview High School. He is the son of Molly Jeanne (née Duffy) and Dave Alan Cruikshank. He has five sisters and two brothers.

== Career ==
=== Fred ===
Cruikshank, while testing character ideas, created the Fred character in a Halloween video, and uploaded it to a YouTube channel that he had started with his two cousins. Upon the success of Fred, he started a video series, and set up the Fred channel in April 2008. By April 2009, the channel had over one million subscribers, making it the first YouTube channel to do so, and was the most-subscribed YouTube channel for a 318-day period from October 2008 to August 2009. In December 2009, Cruikshank filmed Fred: The Movie, which aired on Nickelodeon in September 2010. Nickelodeon created a franchise surrounding the character, and began producing the sequel in March 2011. Fred 2: Night of the Living Fred aired on October 22, 2011, also on Nickelodeon. In 2012, Fred: The Show, consisting of twenty-four 22-minute episodes, and a third movie called Fred 3: Camp Fred aired on Nickelodeon.

=== Sponsorship and appearances ===
In the Fred series, Cruikshank promotes various products and movies. He is seen using a Zipit, as well as his own products and T-shirts. In addition to promoting his own movies and albums, Cruikshank has also promoted the movies City of Ember, Year One, and Adventures of Power, and the artist Kev Blaze, by featuring in his song "Watch How I Do This".

He made a guest appearance as both "Fred" and himself on Nickelodeon's iCarly in "iMeet Fred", which first aired on February 16, 2009.

Cruikshank appeared in the Hannah Montana episode "Come Fail Away", which aired December 6, 2009. He appeared at the 2009 Teen Choice Awards as well as the 2010 Kids' Choice Awards presenting awards to winners off-stage. In 2011, he appeared on the Cartoon Network Hall of Game Awards and in an episode of Supah Ninjas. In 2012 and 2013 he starred as the lead in the Nickelodeon television show Marvin Marvin, as an alien "teenage" boy adjusting to human life.

In 2017, Cruikshank stated that he was taking a hiatus from acting, although the decision was not by choice.

=== Other YouTube work ===
Cruikshank was originally a part of JKL Productions, a group comprising twins Jon and Katie Smet and Lucas Cruikshank, their cousin. Cruikshank formally left the group and deleted his individual videos. In January 2009 he set up his own channel, called "lucas", in which he appeared as himself. Between 2013 and 2014, Cruikshank partnered with Jennifer Veal to produce a series of videos on the channel, which was renamed "Lucas and Jenny," adding to the duo's popularity. After Jenny left the channel in November 2014, Cruikshank reverted the channel name back to "lucas" and continued to release comedic travel content, paid celebrity Cameos reviews, food reviews, vlogs, and other YouTube trends. In April 2019, Cruikshank's channel name was changed to "Lucas". It currently has 3.34 million subscribers as of 2026 and maintains a monthly upload schedule.

Cruikshank made an appearance on Brandon Rogers' Four Million Subscriber Freakout video after the latter gained four million subscribers as of June 2018.

On June 13, 2026, Cruikshank (as Fred Figglehorn) appeared in the MrBeast video "50 YouTube Legends Fight For $1,000,000", a special celebrating MrBeast reaching 500 million subscribers. He was eliminated during the first phase of the competition.

== Personal life ==
Cruikshank came out publicly as gay in a YouTube video released August 20, 2013, saying, "I'm gay. I feel so weird saying it on camera. But my family and friends have known for like three years. I just haven't felt the need to announce it on the Internet." Cruikshank met his now-husband, Australian model Matthew Fawcus, "from afar" at a gay club, and the two were introduced by YouTuber Kingsley. The pair began dating on March 18, 2013.

== Filmography ==
=== Internet ===
Year	Title	Role	Notes
2006–2014, 2020–2021	Fred	Fred Figglehorn	
2010	Annoying Orange	Fred Figglehorn	Episode: "Fred"
2012–2018	YouTubers React	Himself	13 episodes
2013	The Flipside	Henry	Episode: "Me, Myself and My Conscience"
2014	Cute Combat	Himself	8 episodes
2026	MrBeast	Fred / Himself	Episode: "50 YouTube Legends Fight For 1,000,000"
TBA	Shrek 2 Retold		

=== Television ===
Year	Title	Role	Notes
2009	iCarly	Fred Figglehorn / Himself	Episode: "iMeet Fred"
2009	Hannah Montana	Kyle McIntyre	Episode: "Come Fail Away"
2010	Fred: The Movie	Fred Figglehorn / Derf Nrohelggif	Television film
2011	Supah Ninjas	Spencer / Kickbutt	Episode: "Kickbutt"
2011	Fred 2: Night of the Living Fred	Fred Figglehorn / Derf Nrohelggif / Judy	Television film
2012	Fred: The Show	Fred Figglehorn	Lead role
2012–2013	Marvin Marvin	Marvin Forman	Lead role
2012	Fred 3: Camp Fred	Fred Figglehorn	Television film
2013	Big Time Rush	Himself	Episode: "Big Time Cameo"
2013	Monsters vs. Aliens	Smarty	Voice; Episode: "Screaming Your Calls"

== Discography ==
=== Comedy albums ===
List of studio albums, with selected chart positions and certifications
Title	Album details	Peak chart positions		
Title	Album details	US Comedy	US Heat.	US Holiday
It's Hackin' Christmas with Fred	Released: November 10, 2009; Formats: Digital download; Label: Independent	8	24	13
Who's Ready to Party?	Released: September 21, 2010; Formats: Digital download; Label: Collective Records	1	29	—
"—" denotes releases that did not chart or were not released in that territory.

=== Singles ===
List of singles, with selected chart positions
Title	Year	Peak chart positions		Album
Title	Year	US Comedy	US Holiday	Album
"Christmas Cash"	2009	22	5	It's Hackin' Christmas with Fred
"Christmas Is Creepy"	2009	9	1	It's Hackin' Christmas with Fred
"Fred's 12 Days of Christmas"	2009	—	28	It's Hackin' Christmas with Fred
"I Wanna Be a Celebrity"	2010	11	—	Who's Ready to Party
"—" denotes releases that did not chart or were not released in that territory.

=== Other appearances ===
Title	Year	Album
"All Night" (with Zhone and Fraxiom)	2021	Mutants Vol.6: Home
"The Climb" (with Molly Cruikshank)	2022	Best of Both Worldz

== Awards and nominations ==
Year	Category	Award	Result
2009	Favorite User Generated Video	People's Choice Awards	Nominated
2009	Choice Web Star	Teen Choice Awards	Won
2010	Choice Web Star	Teen Choice Awards	Nominated
2010	Iconic Web Star	J-14 Teen Icon Awards	Nominated
2013	Favorite TV Actor	Kids' Choice Awards	Nominated

Achievements
Preceded by nigahiga	Most Subscribed Channel on YouTube; 2008–2009	Succeeded by nigahiga
