= Fred 2: Night of the Living Fred =

2011 film

- DVD cover
- Based on: Characters by Lucas Cruikshank
- Written by: David A. Goodman
- Directed by: John Fortenberry
- Starring: Lucas Cruikshank; Ariel Winter; John Cena; Daniella Monet; Seth Morris; Jake Weary; Siobhan Fallon Hogan; Carlos Knight
- Music by: Roddy Bottum
- Country of origin: United States
- Original language: English

Production
- Producers: Brian Robbins; Sharla Sumpter Bridgette
- Running time: 84 minutes
- Production companies: Derf Films; Varsity Pictures; The Collective

Original release
- Network: Nickelodeon
- Release: October 22, 2011

Fred 2: Night of the Living Fred (stylized FЯED 2 NIGHT OF THE LIVING FRED) is a 2011 American horror comedy film. The film is the sequel to the 2010 film Fred: The Movie, based on the adventures of Fred Figglehorn, a character created and played by Lucas Cruikshank for Cruikshank's YouTube channel. It is a Halloween-themed sequel, and it is the second film in the Fred trilogy. Jennette McCurdy, who played Bertha in the original Fred, did not return and is replaced by Daniella Monet. John Cena returns as Dad Figglehorn (Fred's imaginary father), and Jake Weary returns to play Kevin. Supah Ninjas star Carlos Knight co-stars as Kevin's friend and partner. Pixie Lott, who played Judy in the first film, also did not return and her character was written out; it is revealed by Fred that they broke up.

The film received mixed to negative reviews; it was, however, considered an improvement over the original. The Nickelodeon TV premiere drew 5.7 million viewers.

== Plot ==
Fred Figglehorn goes into music class to find his favorite teacher, Mrs. Felson, has been replaced by a teacher named Mr. Devlin. Walking home from school, Fred notices a strange girl named Talia following him. Fred believes he is being stalked, but she just walks the same way to school as him. Spying on Devlin that night, Fred sees him burying something, which he suspects is the body of Mrs. Felson. Kevin's mother invites Fred and his mother to a party for Mr. Devlin. At the party, Fred's mother falls in love with Mr. Devlin, and Fred is horrified to learn that Talia is actually Kevin's sister.

The next day, Fred becomes skeptical of Devlin and reaches the conclusion that he is a vampire. Mr. Devlin takes Fred's mother on a date, so Fred enlists his friend Bertha to spy on them. At a restaurant, Fred and Bertha learn that Mr. Devlin doesn't like garlic on his fries, making them all the more suspicious.

Fred is horrified at school the following day to discover Mr. Devlin running a blood drive at school. He's even more worried to discover Bertha taking personal music lessons from Devlin. Fred gathers items to use as weapons against Devlin, planning to defeat him at the school piano recital. Fred arms himself with various tools and goes on a shooting spree of garlic sauce at the recital, soaking everyone except Devlin.

Mr. Devlin invites him into his house for dinner after the fiasco, so that they can "Bury the hatchet". Fred sets up a live video stream from his cell phone so he can prove to his classmates that Devlin is a vampire. After showing off Devlin's living room and digging for "bodies", Fred discovers a secret butchers' room behind a wall filled with meat and bones. As Fred investigates, Devlin comes in with a long knife and a tall headdress. Fred then drops his phone into a pot of boiling liquid, freezing on Devlin, and the image of Devlin in his headdress causes everyone watching the video to think that he is a vampire. But after Devlin explains every hobby he has, Fred starts to relate to him, and he comes to realize Devlin is not a vampire, just an eccentric and cultural music teacher.

Everyone at Fred's school has seen his video, which makes everyone believe that Devlin is a vampire. Fred runs to Devlin's house to apologize, but Devlin is too depressed to answer. When Fred learns Devlin has gotten fired and put his house up for sale, he feels guilty and decides to fix things by making everyone think he himself is the vampire. Bertha and Talia both help, as Talia reveals how much she dislikes her brother. Kevin and his friends go up to Devlin's house because they think he has kidnapped Talia. Fred walks out of the garage carrying her, threatening to turn her into a vampire. Bertha makes Kevin stab Fred, and he gets sprayed with fake blood, making everyone believe Fred really is a vampire. Devlin accepts Fred's apology, revealing that he quit his job and sold his house of his own choice, but still sees Fred as his one true friend. As Fred's mother and Devlin go out for a good-bye lunch, Fred looks at the mirror in his house and sees that Mr. Devlin has no reflection, revealing that he was a vampire after all.

== Cast ==
- Lucas Cruikshank as Fred Figglehorn / Derf: Fred is a socially awkward and extremely hyperactive fifteen-year-old. Derf is a mysterious stranger who resembles the opposite of Fred.
  - Cruikshank also briefly plays Judy in drag, in a flashback scene parodying Casablanca showing her breaking up with Fred.
- Jake Weary as Kevin Lebow; a bully who lives across the street from Fred.
  - Jay Jay Warren as Young Kevin
- Siobhan Fallon Hogan as Hilda Figglehorn, Fred's exhausted mother.
- Stephanie Courtney as Janet Lebow, Kevin and Talia's mother.
- Carlos Knight as Diesel, Kevin's best friend.
- Seth Morris as Mr. Jake Devlin, the new music teacher and Fred's new neighbor.
- Daniella Monet as Bertha, Fred's best friend who wears bizarre clothing, but cares little for what others think. Monet replaces Jennette McCurdy, who portrayed the character in the first film.
- John Cena as Dad Figglehorn, Fred's imaginary dad who appears almost out of nowhere to offer Fred advice and support throughout the film. He lives in the family's refrigerator.
- Ariel Winter as Talia Lebow, the new girl in school and Kevin's sister, who wants Kevin to be nice to Fred. She has an obvious secret crush on Fred. She serves as Fred's love interest.
- Matthew Scott Montgomery as Teen Manager.
- Talon Reid as Kevin's Friend

Additionally, Pixie Lott appears via archive footage as Judy, the pretty girl next door who was Freds crush and eventual girlfriend. Cruikshank stated that Lott did not return because her management didn't allow her to appear in any further films.

== Production ==
Production had taken place throughout the same location of where the previous film had been shot, with most of production conducting over the basis of January–February 2011, with the WWE scene being filmed at a SmackDown taping on April 26, 2011, in Greensboro, North Carolina.

Cruikshank had revealed that during production that some cast members of the film had theorized that the movie would be released in 3D film format; however, the movie in the end was released as a television film.

On April 10, 2011; 3 months after filming had started, a sequel had been announced to be underway and to be released in late 2011.

== Music ==
The film's score was composed by Roddy Bottum, who previously scored the first film.

The music played during the scene when Mr. Devlin and Kevin go in the ring when Fred is dreaming is "Blood", used by the former professional wrestling stable The Brood.

== Reception ==
The film received average to negative reviews. However, they were not as negative as for the previous Fred film. Common Sense Media gave the film 2 out of 5 stars based on 23 reviews.

== Ratings ==
The initial American television premiere on the channel Nickelodeon drew 5.7 million viewers, down from the previous film's premiere of 7.6 million. However it ranked sixth in the most watched for overall weekly cable programming. The second showing, the following Sunday at 11:00 AM, drew 3.7 million viewers, enough to rank it as the fourteenth most watched weekly cable programming. The final primetime broadcasting on October 30 drew in 3.2 million views, which ranked the program within the top 20 of cable programming for the night.

== Sequel ==
A third film called Fred 3: Camp Fred was released on July 28, 2012. This was the last installment in the Fred film series to be released.

== Home media ==
Fred 2: Night of the Living Fred was released on DVD on February 6, 2012. It was also released in a triple pack box set along with Fred: The Movie and Fred 3: Camp Fred on December 4, 2012.
