= Fred: The Movie =

2010 YouTuber comedy film by Clay Weiner

- DVD cover
- Genre: Comedy
- Based on: Characters by Lucas Cruikshank
- Written by: David A. Goodman
- Directed by: Clay Weiner
- Starring: Lucas Cruikshank; Jennette McCurdy; Pixie Lott; John Cena; Siobhan Fallon Hogan; Jake Weary; Oscar Nunez
- Music by: Roddy Bottum
- Country of origin: United States

Production
- Producers: Lucas Cruikshank; Brian Robbins; Sharla Sumpter Bridgett
- Cinematography: Scott Henriksen
- Editor: Ned Bastille
- Running time: 83 minutes
- Production companies: Derf Films; Varsity Pictures; Collective Digital Studio
- Budget: $4 million

Original release
- Network: Nickelodeon
- Release: September 18, 2010

Fred: The Movie (stylized as FЯED: THE MOVIE) is a 2010 American comedy film written by David A. Goodman, directed by Clay Weiner, and produced by Brian Robbins. The film is based on the adventures of Fred Figglehorn, a character created and played by Lucas Cruikshank for Cruikshank's YouTube channel, and it is the first film in the Fred trilogy. The film casts Siobhan Fallon Hogan and John Cena as Fred's parents and pop singer and actress Pixie Lott as Fred's crush Judy. First optioned as a theatrical release, the film instead premiered on children's TV channel Nickelodeon in the United States on September 18, 2010. In the United Kingdom and Ireland, the film was released theatrically on December 17, 2010. This film was the debut of Pixie Lott as an actress.

The film was unanimously panned by critics and has a 0% rating on Rotten Tomatoes. Retrospectively, Fred: The Movie is named as one of the first YouTuber films.

== Plot ==
Fred Figglehorn is an unpopular and hyperactive 15-year-old who believes himself to be cool and a good singer. He has a crush on a girl named Judy, and is devastated to see her performing a romantic duet with his rival and bully Kevin during a music class at school. Fred aspires to one day sing with Judy, but after several failed attempts to visit her at her house, he is told by his mother that she has moved, thus, he embarks on a journey to find Judy's new house and sing with her there.

During his quest, Fred encounters many friends and foes, including a neighborhood girl named Bertha, a Hispanic man who cannot speak English, two eccentric pet shop owners, a talking deer in the forest, and a bedraggled childhood friend named Evan who had gotten lost in said forest years ago. Fred eventually arrives at Judy's home, and he discovers that she is hosting a party to which he was not invited. Fred is bullied by Judy's guests, and Kevin then shoves a pizza onto Fred's shirt, causing him to unintentionally vomit on Judy's party dress. An embarrassed Fred runs home and later finds out that Kevin posted the video of him vomiting on Judy on YouTube. In an attempt to get revenge, Fred decides to throw his own party in which no one will be invited, but he invites a sympathetic Bertha over, and the two put a bunch of mannequins in different costumes and film themselves partying. The next day, Fred edits and posts the video online and his peers, believing it to be real, are jealous that they were not invited, making Fred popular amongst them. Judy goes to Fred's house to apologize, and offers to sing with him, which he gleefully accepts.

== Cast ==
- Lucas Cruikshank as Fred Figglehorn – Fred is a socially awkward and extremely hyper teenager, who constantly longs for his neighbor Judy. Cruikshank also portrays Derf Nrohelggif (the protagonist's name spelled backwards) – a mysterious stranger resembling Fred, yet possessing traits completely opposite to his.
  - Jack Coughlan as a younger Fred
- Jennette McCurdy as Bertha – Fred's best friend who wears bizarre clothing, but cares little for what others think.
- Jake Weary as Kevin Libo – Fred's arch-rival who lives across the street from him. Unlike Fred, he is an experienced singer and is as attracted to Judy as she is to him.
- Siobhan Fallon Hogan as Hilda Figglehorn – Fred's exhausted mother, who spends most of the film napping in her bedroom.
- John Cena as Dad Figglehorn – Fred's imaginary muscular father appears almost out of nowhere to offer Fred advice and support throughout the film.
- Oscar Nunez as Lorenzo
- Stephanie Courtney as Janet Libo, Kevin's mother who wants him and Fred to become friends.
- Pixie Lott as Judy – Fred's love interest. In contrast to the web series, Judy is outwardly friendly toward Fred, but she sometimes fails to stand up for him when her friends bully him.
- Kevin Olson as Evan Weiss a childhood friend of Fred who got lost in the woods for many years.
  - Mak Kriksciun as a younger Evan Weiss.
- Gary Anthony Williams as Laundromat manager
- Robert Noble as #6 Bus Driver
- Chris Wylde as Dam Security Guard
- Jordan Black as Gary
- Dave Silva as a Spanish mechanic who cannot speak English.

== Production ==
Huffington Post author Greg Mitchell made note of the film's production when noting the proliferation of web comedy and dramatic series as a perceived threat to network television. The project performed casting and entered principal photography in November 2009, and completed filming on December 20. After filming wrapped, a yard sale was held in Silver Lake, Los Angeles, California, to sell props, set dressing and costumes from the shoot.

Brian Robbins originally optioned "Fred" as a feature film, but decided to bypass the studio system and provided major funding for the project himself. After filming was completed, excerpts were shown to Nickelodeon head Cyma Zarghami, who began negotiations to acquire the film. Zarghami stated that airing on Nickelodeon would give the film a large audience base and allow him to target a sequel for a theatrical release. The film debuted on Nickelodeon on September 18; however, it was released in British and Irish cinemas on December 17.

According to the director's commentary on the film, found on the DVD, there was much conflict between screenwriter David Goodman and director Clay Weiner creatively. This includes the cutting of certain references and callbacks to Fred and other related works that Goodman had written in.

== Reception ==
Fred: The Movie was panned by critics. On Rotten Tomatoes, it has an approval rating of 0% based on 13 reviews and an average rating of 2.46/10.

In a review of the film on BBC Radio 5 Live, Mark Kermode gave the film a negative review, a large part of which he spent imitating the character Fred's distinctive scream, leading to his microphone being taken away by co-caster Simon Mayo. He paired it with notoriously controversial European horror film A Serbian Film as his least favorite viewing experiences of the year.

It was the second highest viewed TV cable movie of 2010 across all networks. In the UK, it opened in the No. 8 spot, taking in £257,133 in the first week. Additionally, the premiere of Fred: The Movie drew an audience of 7.6 million total viewers.

== Sequels ==
A sequel titled Fred 2: Night of the Living Fred premiered on October 22, 2011. A teaser trailer was broadcast during a commercial break of iCarly. Daniella Monet replaced Jennette McCurdy in the role of Bertha and Modern Family star Ariel Winter also joined the cast. In addition, the character of Judy was written out. Another sequel was released called Fred 3: Camp Fred.

== Home media ==
Fred: The Movie was released on DVD on October 5, 2010, by Lionsgate Home Entertainment. It was also released in a triple pack box set along with Fred 2: Night of the Living Fred and Fred 3: Camp Fred on December 4, 2012. On the DVD for Fred: The Movie, a full length director's commentary is found, recorded by director Clay Weiner, David Goodman, and star Lucas Cruikshank.
