= Fred 3: Camp Fred =

2012 American comedy film

- DVD cover
- Genre: Comedy
- Based on: Characters by Lucas Cruikshank
- Written by: Drew Hancock
- Directed by: Jonathan Judge
- Starring: Lucas Cruikshank; Tom Arnold; Daniella Monet; Jake Weary; John Cena; Siobhan Fallon Hogan; Carlos Knight
- Music by: Roddy Bottum
- Country of origin: United States
- Original language: English

Production
- Producer: Don Dunn
- Cinematography: Brandon Mastrippolito
- Editor: Andrey Ragozin
- Running time: 81 minutes
- Production companies: Derf Films; Varsity Pictures; The Collective

Original release
- Network: Nickelodeon
- Release: July 28, 2012

Fred 3: Camp Fred is a 2012 American comedy film directed by Jonathan Judge. It is the third and final installment in the Fred trilogy, following Fred 2: Night of the Living Fred. Released on July 28, 2012, the film stars Lucas Cruikshank, Tom Arnold, Jake Weary, and John Cena. The film received mixed reviews.

== Plot ==
Following the last day of school, Fred Figglehorn reveals his hopes to attend a very popular and luxurious summer camp named Camp Superior, but his dreams are dashed when he learns his mother is sending him to Camp Iwannapeepee instead, a camp Fred finds horrible, with the camp bus driver admitting to reckless driving and mispronouncing Fred's full name as "Ted Twinklecorn". Upon arrival, he meets head counselor Floyd Spunkmeyer, and a host of other campers, Magoo, Chatter, Spoon and Dig, and is introduced to Oksana, a beautiful but incompetent Russian camp nurse.

Fred learns that Camp Iwannapeepee and Camp Superior have been competing in summer camp games for 69 years and that Superior has always won. Fred tries asking his imaginary father for advice, but tells him that he is on his own before disappearing. Fred also thinks he has unearthed a plot to drug the food of the Iwannapeepee campers, in order for a giant rat to eat their brains in a place called "The Rat Hole". Avoiding the gruel, he instead eats hallucinogenic red berries, and throws up when the others find him. Fred learns that Magoo, Chatter, Spoon, and Dig go to "The Rat Hole" because it's a hideout they've had since being in camp. The "drug" that was put in the gruel was super-vitamins, because the gruel has no nutritional value. When he learns that his arch rival Kevin is on the team from Superior, Fred becomes determined to defeat the rival camp. When the competition begins, Camp Superior dominates the first day, winning every event.

At the end of the day, Camp Iwannapeepee is depressed, and Magoo, Chatter, Spoon and Dig do not even want to go to their hideout. Fred, on the other hand, says that they are losers, but they are good at being the best at the bad and good things they do. The next day, Iwannapeepee stuns Superior by winning the next round of contests, leading to the winner-take-all event, a songwriting contest.

When Kevin's friends say that they should stop Fred, Kevin laughs saying that Fred is horrible at singing, but has set up a tank of gruel to sabotage him just in case. After Camp Superior's song, Fred and Camp Iwannapeepee are nervous at first, but go on stage. Fred starts singing a made-up song of his own called "The Loser Song". It starts making Kevin and the others laugh, but as the song progresses, it makes almost everyone dance, including a small number of Camp Superior members. When Kevin's gruel blaster fails and Camp Iwannapeepee is proclaimed the winner of the games, Kevin furiously lashes out saying that "Fred never wins." His friend Diesel manages to activate the gruel blaster after realizing it was not plugged in, resulting in Kevin losing his clothes and being laughed off-stage. As the campers leave the camp for the end of summer and prepare to go home, Fred tells his mother that he has made some new friends, and his mother has found a new man, a pizza delivery guy.

== Cast ==
- Lucas Cruikshank as Fred Figglehorn.
- Jake Weary as Kevin Lebow; Fred's archrival, who attends Camp Superior.
- Siobhan Fallon Hogan as Hilda Figglehorn, Fred's mother.
- Carlos Knight as Diesel; Kevin's friend and assistant in his plans, who also attends Camp Superior.
- Daniella Monet as Bertha; Fred's gothic friend.
- Joey Bragg as Magoo a nerdy, reliable kid, and one of Fred's cabin mates.
- Matthew Scott Miller as Chatter; one of Fred's cabin mates who despite his name, is fairly quiet.
- Adrian Kali Turner as Dig; one of Fred's cabin mates, who likes to dig holes.
- Leah Lewis as Spoon; the female member of Fred's cabin mates who always eats food, such as gruel.
- Adam Riegler as Lawrence; a camper (and a running gag as well as a perfect keyboard player) of Camp Iwannapeepee.
- Charlie Carver as Hugh Thompson.
- Adam Herschman as Murray; the inept worker of Camp Iwannapeepee.
- Steve Hytner as Ivan; the head counselor of Camp Superior.
- Madison Riley as Nurse Oksana; the beautiful but incompetent nurse at Camp Iwannapeepee. All the boys, aside from Fred, have crushes on her. She speaks with a Russian accent.
- John Cena as Dad Figglehorn; Fred's imaginary father, who appears in fridges and gives Fred advice.
- Tracey Walter as Scary Gary.
- Tom Arnold as Floyd Spunkmeyer; the head of Camp Iwannapeepee.

== Production ==
In December 2011, it was announced that Lucas Cruikshank would be starring as Fred Figglehorn in a live action Nickelodeon series and in a third Fred film. Varsity Pictures and The Collective, who had produced the first film, would be producing the third.

Production took place in May 2012 in Los Angeles, California.

== Ratings ==
The film's initial American airing, on Nickelodeon on July 28, 2012, was watched by 3.5 million viewers. This was a 39% decline from the 5.7 million viewers, the previous film, Fred 2: Night of the Living Fred premiered with, and ranked eighteenth in top cable programming for the week.

== Accolades ==
Year	Award	Category	Recipient	Result	Ref.
2013	Young Artist Award	Best Performance in a TV Movie, Miniseries, Special or Pilot - Leading Young Actress	Leah Lewis	Nominated	

== Home media ==
Fred 3: Camp Fred was released on DVD on December 4, 2012. It was also released in a triple pack box set along with Fred: The Movie and Fred 2: Night of the Living Fred on the same date.
