= Stephanie Courtney =

American actress and comedian (born 1970)

- Courtney in 2026
- Born: February 8, 1970 (age 56); Stony Point, New York, U.S.
- Education: Binghamton University (BA)
- Occupations: Actress, comedian
- Years active: 1998–present
- Known for: Portraying Flo in Progressive Insurance ads
- Spouse: Scott Kolanach (m. 2008)

Stephanie Courtney (born February 8, 1970) is an American actress and comedian, best known for playing the advertising character Flo in television and radio commercials for Progressive Corporation beginning in 2008.

Courtney is also noted for her recurring roles on several television series, including the voices of Renee the Receptionist and Joy Peters on the Adult Swim comedy Tom Goes to the Mayor (2004–2006), Marge on the AMC drama Mad Men (2007), and Diane on the ABC comedy Cavemen (2007). She also appeared in the season 2 premiere of Men of a Certain Age, and played Essie Karp in The Goldbergs. Courtney was a member of The Groundlings, an improvisational and sketch comedy theater in Los Angeles, California.

== Early life and education ==
Courtney was born in Stony Point, Rockland County, New York, the youngest of three children of a high-school history teacher father and a singer mother. In 1992, she graduated with a degree in English from Binghamton University, where she played Elizabeth Proctor in The Crucible, affirming her decision to be an actress. After graduation, she moved to New York City, where her roommate was future author and columnist Meghan Daum. While working as a secretary for Smith Barney chairman Robert F. Greenhill, Courtney studied acting at the Neighborhood Playhouse.

She moved to Los Angeles, where she roomed with her sister, actress Jennifer Courtney. The two wrote and performed the sketch "Those Courtney Girls" in Los Angeles and at the Aspen Comedy Festival. She joined the training program of the improvisational and sketch comedy group The Groundlings, and in 2004 became a member of its 30-person main company. There she met the theater's lighting director, Scott Kolanach, whom she married in 2008.

During her early time in Los Angeles she worked odd jobs, including catering, to support herself.

She has appeared in films including The Brothers Solomon, Blades of Glory, The Heartbreak Kid, Melvin Goes to Dinner, and Fred: The Movie.

== Filmography ==
Film
Year	Title	Role	Notes
1998	Sweet Bird of You	Kate	Short film
2003	Melvin Goes to Dinner	Alex	
2005	Broadcast 23	Mrs. Morgan	Short film
2006	For Your Consideration	Boom operator	
2007	Blades of Glory	Reporter at sign ups	
2007	The Brothers Solomon	Sara	
2007	The Heartbreak Kid	Gayla	
2009	Coco Lipshitz: Behind the Laughter	Karen Balsac	Short film
2009	Christmas Eve: Alaska	Melissa	Short film
2010	Fred: The Movie	Janet	
2017	Girlfriend's Day	Cathy Gile	
2023	Peak Season	Lydia Friedman	

Television
Year	Title	Role	Notes
1998	Mr. Show with Bob and David	Waitress	Episode: "Eat Rotten Fruit from a Shitty Tree"
2000	Tenacious D	Various	Episode: "The Fan"
2001	Angel	Gwen (Files and Records)	Episode: "Dad"
2002	Everybody Loves Raymond	Woman	Episode: "Cookies"
2003	The Man Show	Various	Episode: "The New Guys"
2003	Sketch Pad	Various	Episode: "Roller"
2004	Significant Others	Pam	Episode: "A School, Not Cool & a Fool"
2004	Faking the Video	Fake producer	Main cast; 7 episodes
2004	Without a Trace	Lynette Shaw	Episode: "American Goddess"
2004–2006	Tom Goes to the Mayor	Various voices	Main cast; 27 episodes
2005	ER	Charlotte	Episode: "Just as I Am"
2005	The Comeback	Carolina	2 episodes
2006	Courting Alex	Ticket agent	Episode: "Birthday"
2006	Lovespring International	Woman on tape	Episode: "A Rear Window"
2006	Re-Animated	Team member Donna	Television film
2007	Celebrity Deathmatch	Mischa Barton, Tina Fey	Voice, 2 episodes
2007	Mad Men	Marge	5 episodes
2007–08	Cavemen	Diane	3 episodes
2008	Tim and Eric Awesome Show, Great Job!	Demons casting director	Episode: "Robin"
2008	Kath & Kim	Ruth	Episode: "Money"
2009	United States of Tara	Beth	Episode: "Aftermath"
2010	The Jay Leno Show	Leno family member	Episode 75
2010	Sons of Tucson	Denise	Episode: "The Break-In"
2010	House	Claire	Episode: "Selfish"
2010	Men of a Certain Age	Stephanie	Episode: "If I Could, I Surely Would"
2011	The Looney Tunes Show	Emma Webster (young Granny)	Voice, episode: "Eligible Bachelors"
2011	Fred 2: Night of the Living Fred	Janet	
2012	Fred: The Show	Janet	Main cast; 4 episodes
2012	Phineas and Ferb	Additional voices	Episode: "What'd I Miss?"
2014	2 Broke Girls	Eleanor	Episode: "And the Wedding Cake Cake Cake"
2014	Comedy Bang! Bang!	Blanche	Episode: "Fred Armisen Wears Black Jeans & Glasses"
2014	You're the Worst	Bookstore manager	3 episodes
2015, 2020	Mike Tyson Mysteries	Mrs. Ensler, Alicia Stevenson	Voice, 2 episodes
2015	W/ Bob and David	Jeannie	Episode: "1.3"
2016	Major Crimes	Dr. Deb	Episode: "Off the Wagon"
2018–23	The Goldbergs	Essie Karp	Recurring, 31 episodes
2018, 2024	Blaze and the Monster Machines	Cousin Tilly	Voice, 2 episodes
2019	Green Eggs and Ham	Various	Voice, 4 episodes

Web
Year	Title	Role	Notes
2007	Derek and Simon: The Show	Glenda	Episode: "Troubled Times: Part 2 – Murder & Deception"
2008	Face to Bush	Mary McQueegle	
2008–09	Back on Topps	Debbie Topps	
