= David A. Goodman =

American writer and producer

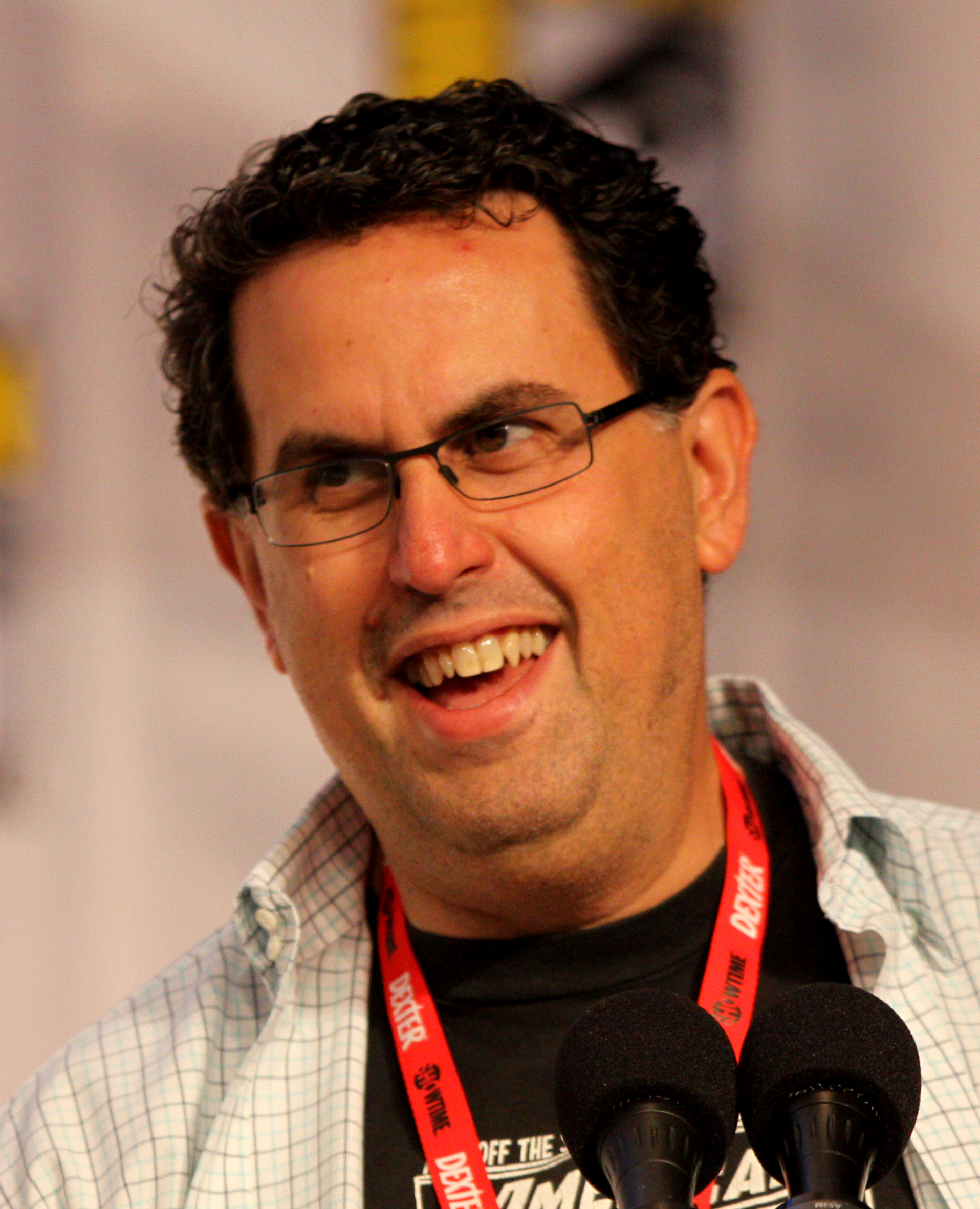
- Goodman at the 2010 San Diego Comic-Con

President of the Writers Guild of America West
- In office 2017–2021
- Succeeded by: Meredith Stiehm

Personal details
- Born: David Avram Goodman; December 13, 1962 (age 63) New Rochelle, New York, U.S.
- Education: University of Chicago
- Occupation: Television producer, television writer
- Years active: 1986–present

David Avram Goodman (born December 13, 1962) is an American television writer and producer. He has been a writer for numerous television series, such as Family Guy, The Golden Girls, Futurama (where he was also a co-executive producer and wrote the notable Star Trek parody episode "Where No Fan Has Gone Before"), and Star Trek: Enterprise. In film, Goodman produced Stewie Griffin: The Untold Story, and wrote the 2010 comedy film Fred: The Movie, based on the Fred Figglehorn YouTube series, as well as its sequel, Fred 2: Night of the Living Fred. In 2022, he wrote the critically acclaimed film Honor Society for Paramount+.

From 2017 to 2021, he was the President of the labor union Writers Guild of America West.

== Biography ==
Goodman is a graduate of the University of Chicago, where he earned a BA in 1984. He is of Jewish background.

During commentary for the Futurama episode "Where No Fan Has Gone Before", which he wrote, Goodman mentioned that he is a dedicated Star Trek fan, with an encyclopedic knowledge of the original series, and correctly identified every episode number and name mentioned in dialogue. He also states in the commentary that his work for Futurama for the Star Trek episode was partly what gained him a job writing for Star Trek: Enterprise, after Futurama.

He was an executive producer of Family Guy, beginning in its fourth season, after joining the show as a co-executive producer in season three.

Goodman is known for his nasal voice, which has been the subject of jokes numerous times in Family Guy audio commentaries, particularly by the creator Seth MacFarlane and writer Alec Sulkin, who both believe his voice is similar to that of Ray Romano. Goodman has voiced parodies of Romano in Family Guy episodes by simply talking, without performing an impression.

In 2011, Goodman left Family Guy to produce the animated Fox series Allen Gregory. After Allen Gregory was cancelled, he then became an executive producer of another MacFarlane show, American Dad!. In 2017, he worked with MacFarlane, on The Orville, as an executive producer, and was also elected as president of the Writers Guild of America West (WGAW).

He has written three books set in the Star Trek Universe, Star Trek: Federation - The First 150 Years (2012), The Autobiography of James T. Kirk (2015) and The Autobiography of Jean-Luc Picard (2017).

He wrote the critically acclaimed film Honor Society, which premiered on July 29, 2022, on Paramount+. It stars Angourie Rice, Gaten Matarazzo and Christopher Mintz-Plasse.

== Writers Guild of America West presidency ==
Elected in 2017 and re-elected in 2019 as WGAW president, Goodman oversaw the negotiating committee for the "WGA-Agency Agreement", and joined other Writers Guild of America (WGA) members in firing his agents as part of the guild's stand against the Association of Talent Agents (ATA), after the two sides were unable to come to an agreement on a new "Code of Conduct" that addressed the practice of packaging, which had been deemed unfair by the WGA.

In November 2022, it was announced that Goodman would serve as co-chair of the Minimum Basic Agreement (MBA) negotiation committee. This committee negotiates upcoming contracts with the Alliance of Motion Picture and Television Producers (AMPTP). The Writer's Guild was unable to negotiate a contract within the May 1, 2023, deadline, and the MBA agreement expired. The Writer's Guild subsequently went on strike as a result.

== Credits ==
- The Golden Girls (1986–1989) — story editor
- Babes (1990–1991) — story editor
- Dream On (1995) — writer ("Long Distance Runaround")
- Flesh 'n' Blood (1991) — executive story editor
- Rhythm & Blues (1992–1993) — executive story editor
- Flying Blind (1993) — co-producer
- Wings (1993–1996) — writer, creative consultant
  - "Good 2 Be 4 Gotten" (1993)
  - "She's Baaack" (1995)
- Pig Sty (1995) — creative consultant
- The Adventures of Captain Zoom in Outer Space (1995) — supervising producer
- Scooby-Doo and the Witch's Ghost (1999) — writer
- Stark Raving Mad (1999–2000) — writer, supervising producer, creative consultant
  - "Sometimes a Friter is Just a Fritter" (1999)
  - "Christmas Cheerleader" (1999)
  - "The Big Finish" (2000) (story)
- Family Guy (2001–2018) — writer, co-executive producer, consulting producer, executive producer, showrunner, voice actor
  - "You May Now Kiss the... Uh... Guy Who Receives" (2006)
  - "Stewie Kills Lois" (2007)
  - "It's a Trap!" (2011)
  - "The Big Bang Theory" (2011)
  - "Forget-Me-Not" (2012)
  - "Hot Shots" (2016)
  - "V Is for Mystery" (2018)
- Futurama (2002–2003, 2023) — writer, co-executive producer
  - "Where No Fan Has Gone Before" (2002)
  - "Related to Items You've Viewed" (2023)
  - "The Temp" (2024)
  - "The Trouble with Truffles" (2025)
- Star Trek: Enterprise (2002–2004) — writer, consulting producer
  - "Precious Cargo" (2002) (teleplay)
  - "Judgment" (2003) (story and teleplay)
  - "North Star" (2003)
  - "The Forgotten" (2004)
- Stewie Griffin: The Untold Story (2005) — executive producer
- Fred: The Movie (2010) — writer
- Allen Gregory (2011) — executive producer showrunner
- Fred 2: Night of the Living Fred (2011) — writer
- Lego Batman 2: DC Super Heroes (2012, videogame) — writer
- American Dad (2013–2014) — executive producer
- Dads (2013–2014) — writer, consulting producer
  - Comic Book Issues (2013)
- Murder Police (2013) — executive producer
- Lego Batman 3: Beyond Gotham (2014, videogame) — story
- The Orville (2017–2022) — writer, executive producer
  - "Krill" (2017)
  - "Deflectors" (2019)
  - "The Road Not Taken" (2019)
  - "From Unknown Graves" (2022)
- Bless the Harts (2019–2020) — consulting producer
- Elder Voices: Stories for These Times (2019) — producer
- Honor Society (2022) — writer
- Hysteria! (2024) — executive producer, showrunner, writer
  - "It's Late" (2024)
