= Varsity Pictures =

American film production company

- Type: Incentive
- Industry: Film and TV
- Predecessor: Tollin/Robbins Productions
- Founded: March 2007; 19 years ago
- Founder: Sharla Sumpter Bridgett; Brian Robbins
- Fate: Dormancy
- Headquarters: Culver City, California, U.S.
- Area served: Worldwide
- Products: Film, Television

Varsity Pictures was an American film and television production company founded in 2007 by Sharla Sumpter Bridgett and Brian Robbins. It produced Sonny with a Chance, So Random!, Blue Mountain State, Supah Ninjas, and Fred: The Show. It also produced Fred: The Movie, Playing with Guns, Fred 2: Night of the Living Fred, and A Thousand Words.

== History ==
The company was formed in 2007 under a first-look deal at DreamWorks Pictures following the dissolution of the Tollin/Robbins Productions partnership. It was managed by Brian Robbins, who previously co-ran Tollin/Robbins Productions, and Sharla Sumpter Bridgett, the former head of Tollin/Robbins' film production unit. The company name is named after the movie Varsity Blues, which Brian Robbins is producing and directing.

In 2012, the partnership ended. Sumpter Bridgett left to launch her own independent company, while Robbins took sole leadership of Varsity Pictures to produce The Royals under an overall deal with Lionsgate Television.

== Filmography ==
=== Television ===
Title	Years	Network
Sonny with a Chance	2009–2011	Disney Channel
Blue Mountain State	2010–2011	Spike
Supah Ninjas	2011–2013	Nickelodeon
So Random!	2011–2012	Disney Channel
Fred: The Show	2012	Nickelodeon
The Royals	2015–2018	E!

=== Film ===
Title	Release date
Fred: The Movie	September 18, 2010
Fred 2: Night of the Living Fred	October 22, 2011
A Thousand Words	March 9, 2012
Fred 3: Camp Fred	June 28, 2012
The To Do List	July 26, 2013
