= Daniella Monet =

American actress, entrepreneur and singer (born 1989)

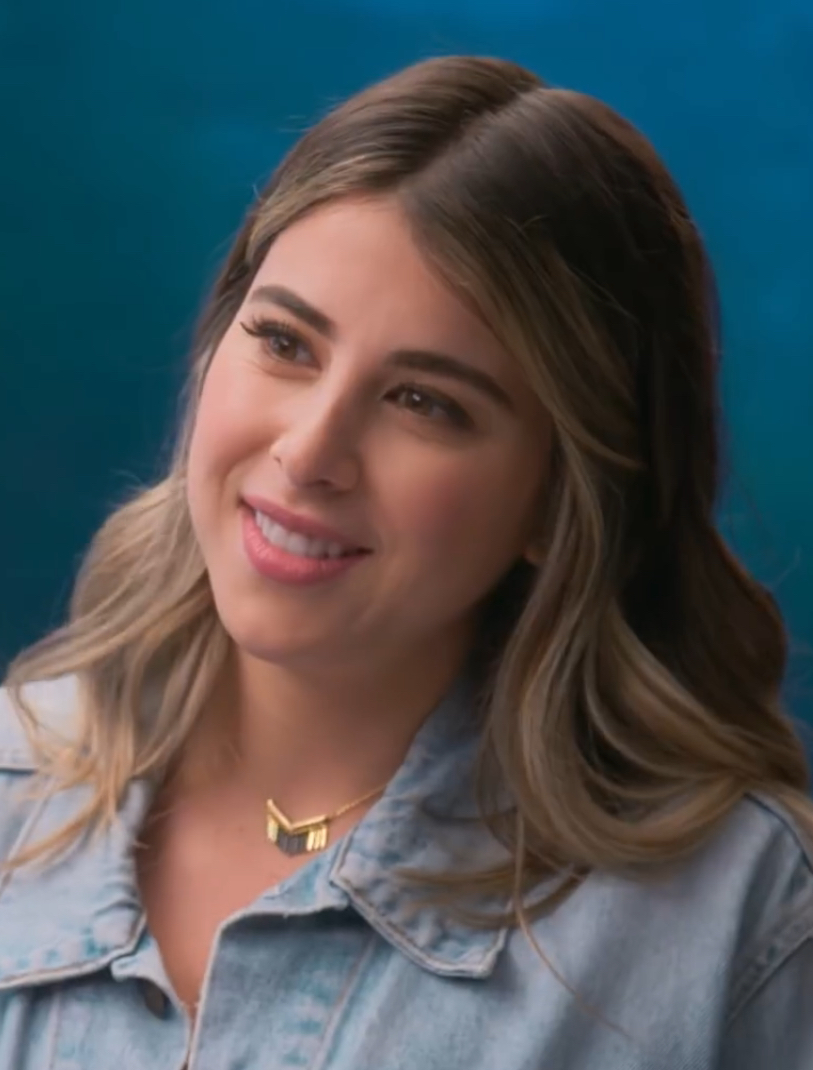
- Monet in 2019
- Born: Danijela Monet Zuvić; March 1, 1989 (age 37); West Hills, California, U.S.
- Occupations: Actress; entrepreneur; television personality
- Years active: 1997–present
- Spouse: Andrew Gardner (m. 2022)
- Children: 2

Daniella Monet Gardner (née Zuvić; born March 1, 1989) is an American actress, entrepreneur, and television personality. She is best known for her role as Trina Vega in the Nickelodeon television series Victorious (2010–2013) and its sequel Hollywood Arts (2026).

Monet's other Nickelodeon roles include Rebecca Martin in Zoey 101 (2006–2007), Mitzi in Winx Club (2012), and Bertha in the Fred films and series (2011–2012). She also appears in the mystery film Nancy Drew (2007), the Freeform series Baby Daddy (2016–2017), and the independent film Aloha Surf Hotel (2020).

Outside of acting, Monet hosted the sketch-comedy series AwesomenessTV (2013–2015) and the game show Paradise Run (2016–2018). She co-founded the vegan beauty brand Kinder Beauty.

== Early life ==
Daniella Monet Zuvic was born in West Hills, California. Her father is of Chilean descent with Croatian and Spanish ancestry while her mother is of Italian descent. She has one brother, Mario Zuvic.

== Career ==
In 2003, Monet had a recurring role on the NBC drama series American Dreams. Monet landed a recurring role on the ABC sitcom 8 Simple Rules as Missy Keinfield, Rory's love interest in the second season. She has a sister, Sissy (Elena Lyons), who likes C.J.. She was eventually cast as Megan Kleinman in the CBS short-lived sitcom Listen Up.

Monet, along with Taylor Momsen and Miley Cyrus, the latter eventually winning the role, was one of the final three contenders for the lead role in Hannah Montana. She also guest-starred on Zoey 101 appearing in three episodes from 2006 to 2007. Monet also appeared in the 2010 film Simon Says and in the 2007 films Nancy Drew and Taking Five.

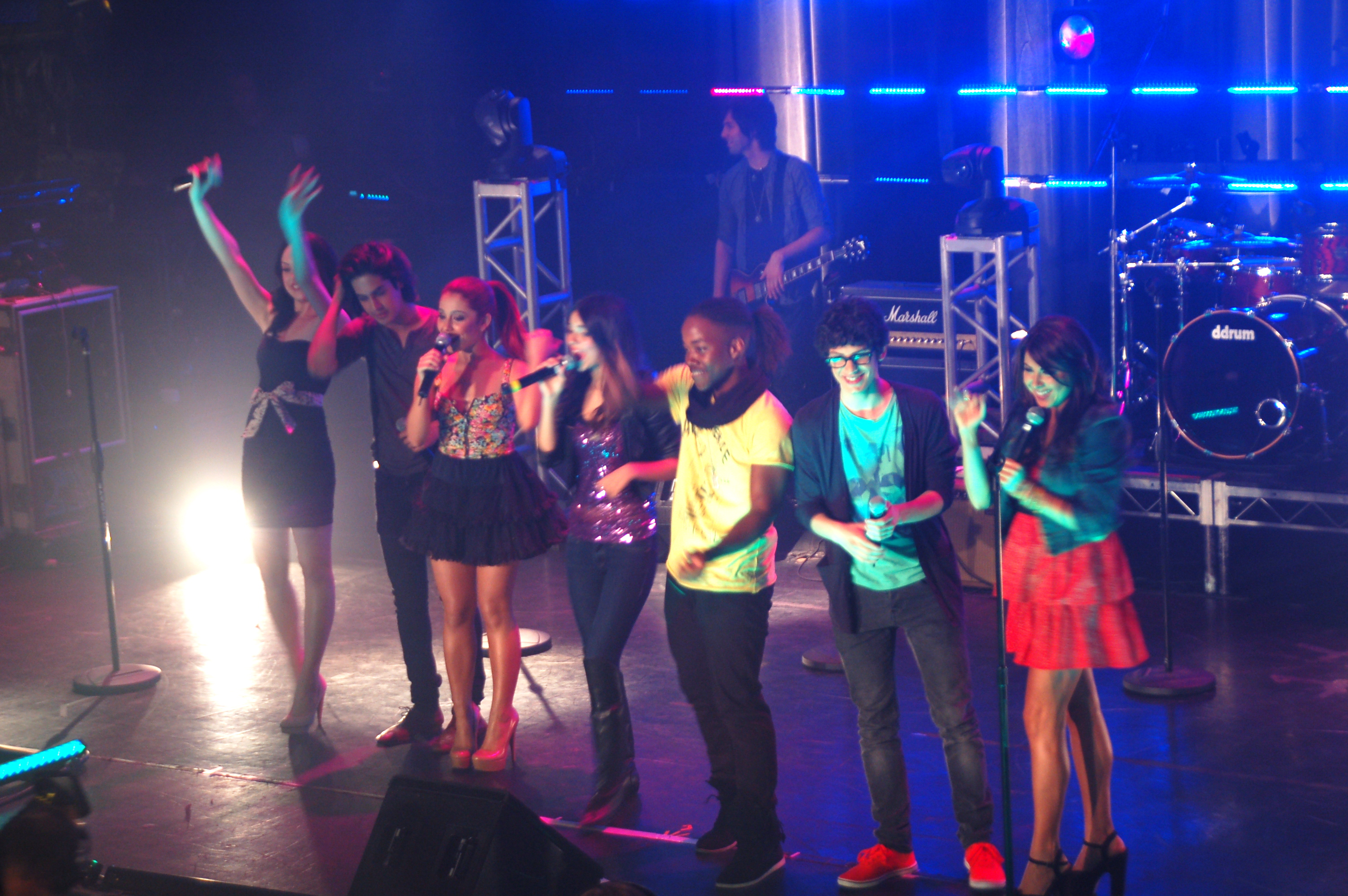
Monet with the cast of Victorious in 2011

From 2010 to 2013, Monet starred in the Nickelodeon comedy series Victorious as Trina Vega, the elder sister of Victoria Justice's Tori Vega and a fellow student of Hollywood Arts that has no talent and is described as "weird" and "annoying". She also replaced Jennette McCurdy as the character Bertha in Fred 2: Night of the Living Fred, Fred 3: Camp Fred and Fred: The Show.

Monet hosted a Nickelodeon sketch comedy reality series called AwesomenessTV that premiered July 1, 2013, but the show was cancelled after 2 seasons in 2015. It is transplanted from YouTube clips adding new material. Segments included character sketches, celebrity satires, and parody music videos. She also hosted the Nickelodeon game show Paradise Run from 2016 to 2018.

== Personal life ==
Monet is a vegan.

In December 2017, Monet became engaged to Andrew Gardner after six years of dating. They married on December 29, 2022. The couple have two children; a son born in September 2019, and a daughter in February 2021.

== Filmography ==
=== Film ===
Year	Title	Role	Notes
2007	Nancy Drew	Inga Veinshtein	
2007	Taking Five	Gabby Davis	
2007	Taking The Band: Making Taking 5	Herself	
2007	Taking 5: On Set	Herself	
2010	Follow Your Heart	Young Angie	
2010	Simon Says	Sarah	
2010	Here's the Kicker	Lacey Matthews	
2011	Fred 2: Night of the Living Fred	Bertha	
2011	A Fairly Odd Movie: Grow Up, Timmy Turner!	Tootie	
2012	A Fairly Odd Christmas	Tootie	
2012	Fred 3: Camp Fred	Bertha	
2014	Rachel's Return	Danielle	
2014	A Fairly Odd Summer	Tootie	
2020	Aloha Surf Hotel	Babymooner	
2020	Beckman	Isabel	

=== Television ===
Year	Title	Role	Notes
1997	Pacific Blue	Young Corey	Episode: "Avenging Angel"
2003	American Dreams	Joyce Fitzsimmons	3 episodes
2003	Still Standing	Bethany	Episode: "Still Negotiating"
2003–2004	8 Simple Rules	Missy Kleinfeld	4 episodes
2004	The Bernie Mac Show	Karen	Episode: "Go Bernie, It's Your Birthday"
2004–2005	Listen Up	Megan Kleinman	Main role
2006–2007	Zoey 101	Rebecca Martin	3 episodes
2008	Miss Guided	Meredith Ritter	Episode: "The List"
2008	The Suite Life of Zack & Cody	Dana	Episode: "Benchwarmers"
2010, 2011	iCarly	Popular Girl	Episode: "iPsycho"
2010, 2011	iCarly	Trina Vega	Episode: "iParty with Victorious"
2010–2013	Victorious	Trina Vega	Main role
2011	Supah Ninjas	Clarissa	Episode: "Morningstar Academy"
2011–2015	Winx Club	Mitzi (voice)	Recurring role
2012	Fred: The Show	Bertha	Main role
2012	Figure It Out	Herself	Recurring panelist
2013–2015	AwesomenessTV	Herself	Host
2013	Melissa & Joey	Ashley	Episode: "Family Feud"
2014	Turbo Fast	Princess (voice)	Voice role
2014	See Dad Run	Tracy McFee	2 episodes
2015	Nicky, Ricky, Dicky & Dawn	Herself	Episode: "Go Hollywood"
2015	When Duty Calls	Ellie Skopic	Television film
2016–2017	Baby Daddy	Sam Saffe	Recurring role (season 5); guest (season 6)
2016–2018	Paradise Run	Herself	Host
2017	Nickelodeon Sizzling Summer Camp Special	Big Hand	Television special
2019	Cousins for Life	Denise	2 episodes
2024	Holiday Crashers	Bri	Television film
2025	Sisterhood, Inc.	Izzy	Television film
2026–present	Hollywood Arts	Trina Vega	Lead role; also executive producer

=== Music videos ===
Year	Title	Role	Artist
2018	"Thank U, Next"	Cheerleader	Ariana Grande

== Discography ==
=== Soundtrack appearances ===
Year	Title	Album
2011	"Lookin' Like Magic" (with Drake Bell)	A Fairly Odd Movie: Grow Up, Timmy Turner!
2011	"I Want You Back" (with the Victorious cast)	Victorious: Music from the Hit TV Show
2011	"All I Want Is Everything" (with the Victorious cast)	Victorious: Music from the Hit TV Show
2011	"Leave It All to Shine" (with the cast of Victorious and iCarly)	Victorious: Music from the Hit TV Show
2012	"Don't You (Forget About Me)" (with the Victorious cast)	Victorious 2.0: More Music from the Hit TV Show
2012	"Shut Up 'N Dance" (with the Victorious cast)	Victorious 2.0: More Music from the Hit TV Show
2012	"Five Fingaz to the Face" (with the Victorious cast)	Victorious 2.0: More Music from the Hit TV Show
2012	"Wishful Thinking" (with Drake Bell)	A Fairly Odd Christmas
