= Zipit Wireless Messenger =

Clamshell device produced by Aeronix

The Zipit Wireless Messenger is a small clamshell device originally produced by Aeronix, which is now under the spin-off Zipit Wireless, Inc., that enables Instant Messaging (AOL Instant Messenger, Yahoo! Messenger, MSN Messenger). The newer Z2 also supports SMS while on Wi-Fi wireless networks. The Zipit Wireless Messenger received the iParenting Media Award in 2005 and the Zipit Z2 was awarded “DigitalLife 2007 Best of Show – Portable Gear” by PC Magazine. The Z1 was also recognized by the InnoVision Technology Awards as an award winner in the Technology Application category.

Geekcorps has proposed the Zipit as a leading low-cost communication device.

== Z2 ==
On Sept. 27, 2007, Zipit Wireless introduced the Zipit Wireless Messenger 2 (Z2). It has

- full 2.8 inch QVGA color display
- backlit keyboard
- Mini-SD memory card slot
- MP3 player (MyTunez), streaming audio support
- a photo viewer (MyPhotoz)
- XScale PXA270 312 MHz processor
- 32 MB of SDRAM
- wifi 802.11b/g and now works with open, WEP, and WPA encrypted wireless networks.
- 1230 mAh lithium-ion polymer rechargeable battery.

The Z2 runs Linux.

== Homebrew ==
A number of people have run Linux on the Z2. The most common implementation uses Debian with the Fluxbox window manager. This installation supports mouse emulation, the dillo web browser, pidgin, and other Linux programs.

== Promotion ==
In 2008, Zipit Wireless sponsored the Fred YouTube series, with the Zipit Wireless Messenger 2 appearing in several videos on the channel. Two promotional spin-off videos, titled Fred Fights Over the Computer and Fred Throws a Party!, were released exclusively on the Zipit Wireless YouTube channel and are now unlisted.
