= Supah Ninjas =

American superhero television series

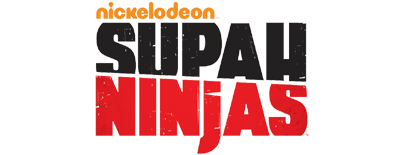
- Genre: Action comedy; Superhero fiction; Teen sitcom
- Created by: Leo Chu; Eric S. Garcia
- Starring: Ryan Potter; Carlos Knight; Gracie Dzienny; George Takei
- Theme music composer: John Debney
- Composers: Josh Debney; Tony Morales
- Country of origin: United States
- Original language: English
- No. of seasons: 2
- No. of episodes: 39

Production
- Executive producers: Brian Robbins; Sharla Sumpter Bridgett; Leo Chu; Eric S. Garcia; Nat Bernstein; Mitchel Katlin
- Cinematography: Alex Nepomniaschy
- Editor: Lauren Schaffer
- Camera setup: Film; Single-camera
- Running time: 23 minutes
- Production companies: Varsity Pictures; Nickelodeon Productions

Original release
- Network: Nickelodeon
- Release: January 17, 2011 – April 27, 2013

Supah Ninjas is an American action superhero teen sitcom, created by Leo Chu and Eric Garcia. The series aired on Nickelodeon from January 17, 2011 to April 27, 2013. It ran for two seasons. The series follows three high school friends—Mike, Owen, and Amanda—who lead a double life as crime-fighting ninjas.

The series was originally created as a starring vehicle for YouTube comedian Ryan Higa, who was slated to play the lead role of Mike. According to Higa, the producers wanted him to remove his YouTube videos, but he refused. The lead role was given to Ryan Potter instead, and Ryan Higa was given a one-time role as the titular villain of the episode "DJ Elephant Head".

The first season was filmed in Los Angeles and the second season was filmed at 31st Street Studios in Pittsburgh. On March 15, 2012, it was announced that the series was renewed for a second season that premiered on February 9, 2013. On May 7, 2013, Nickelodeon cancelled the series after two seasons.

== Plot ==
The series follows Mike Fukanaga and his friends, Owen and Amanda. Following his grandfather's death, Mike receives a mysterious letter that leads him to discover that he comes from a long line of vigilante ninjas. Along with Owen, and later Amanda, they are ushered into the world of crime-fighting, forming the team "Supah Ninjas." They are trained by a hologram of Mike's grandfather, whom Owen refers to as "Hologramps", in Empire City.

== Cast ==
=== Main ===
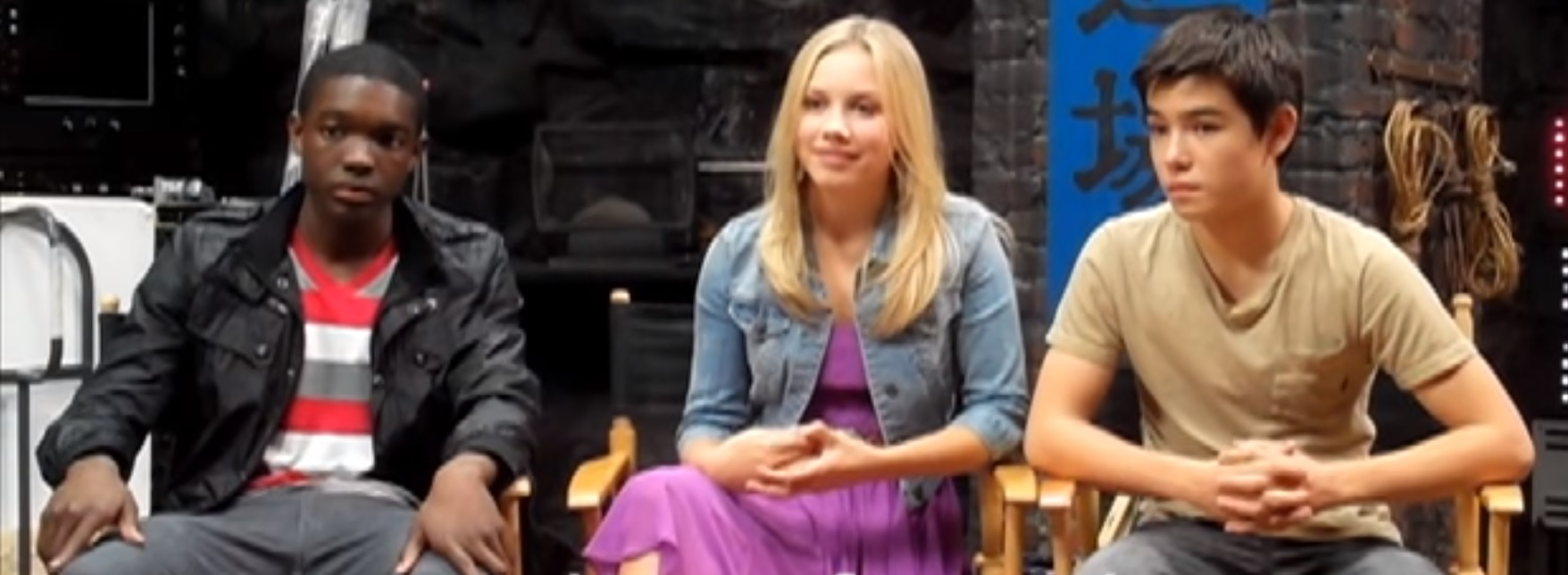
(left to right) Carlos Knight, Gracie Dzienny, and Ryan Potter talk to LA Teen Festival about Supah Ninjas in 2011

- Michael "Mike" Fukanaga (portrayed by Ryan Potter) is a Japanese-American student, who is quiet, shy, socially awkward, and nerdy. He and his best friend Owen discover a secret underground dojo under his bed, where a hologram of his late grandfather awaits to train him in the ways of the ninja. Mike discovers that he is the latest in a long family line of ninjas, besides his father, and ultimately learns about leadership, friendship, discipline, deception, and romance while saving Empire City from villains. His weapon of choice is a pair of nunchucks and his necklace, or mon in Japanese, is a disguised shuriken. His love interest is his friend and fellow ninja Amanda. In the finale, Mike is kidnapped by Kagema.
- Owen Reynolds (portrayed by Carlos Knight) is Mike's best friend and fellow Supah Ninja. He is of African American descent. Owen is eccentric, has a tendency to overreact and show little discipline, and can be food-loving and lazy at times; despite this, his instincts make him a powerful and fearless warrior. He is the only character to call Grandpa Fukunaga "Hologramps". His signature weapon is a Bō staff. He is always trying to impress girls, sometimes using Amanda or Mike as a "wing-man" of sorts.
- Amanda McKay (portrayed by Gracie Dzienny) is a smart, stylish, talented, and popular cheerleader and scholar. In the first episode, she is kidnapped by The Rhymer before being rescued by Mike and Owen, who are still in basic training. Upon discovering who her rescuers are, she pressures them into letting her in on the action by threatening to tell everyone about the "Supah Ninjas", ultimately leading to her inclusion in the group. Her family is wealthy, as they own the chain of McKay Casinos. Later in the series, she seems to develop romantic feelings for Mike. According to Hologramps, she is distinctive from the rest of the group due to her methodical nature. Her weapons of choice are a pair of tonfa.
- Yamato (portrayed by Travis Wong and Jake Huang and voiced by Matthew Yang King (credited as Matt Yang King)) is a sarcastic and wise-cracking X-39-P Fighting Robot trainer, nicknamed "Yama" by The Ninjas, who serves as a practice opponent at the dojo.
- Hattori "Hologramps" Fukanaga (portrayed by George Takei) is the sensei of the Supah Ninjas and Mike's deceased grandfather. A hologram carrying the family ninja legacy, he guides the Supah Ninjas in an underground high-tech dojo beneath the Fukanaga home. He has Yamato guide them in combat while using other tactics, such as meditation, to round out their skill sets. He is disabled by his twin brother Kagema Fukanaga in "The Ishina Strike Back" before being brought back by Quentin/Kid Q in "The Floating Sword", telling the Supah Ninjas that it is time to start the next phase of their training.

=== Recurring ===
- Martin Fukanaga (portrayed by Randall Park) is Mike's widowed father, who works as a police officer. Unlike Hologramps and Mike, the "ninja trait" skipped his generation. He is gullible and somewhat clueless, but well-intentioned, seeing the ninjas as heroes even when others in law enforcement do not seem to.
- Cameron Vanhauser (portrayed by Jordan Nichols) is the son of the owner of Empire Condominiums. Amanda broke up with him after he told her that he felt she was too boring and straight-laced. In "Detention", Amanda tells him that he will meet the perfect girl, even if she is not the one.
- Kelly (portrayed by Giselle Bonilla, season 1) is Amanda's friend and fellow cheerleader. Despite disliking Owen and Mike, she remains the object of Owen's unwarranted flirting and advances. However, it is revealed in "Detention" that she has a soft and considerate side.
- Julie (portrayed by Victory Van Tuyl) is a kind, smart, and attractive girl. She and Mike share a love of comic books, and she becomes his love interest and eventual girlfriend. In "Flint Forster", she breaks up with Mike through a text after having moved away two weeks prior.
- Paloma Peru (portrayed by Marissa Cuevas) is a school reporter who is introduced in "Shadow Fly". Owen seems to have a crush on her. She is actively pursuing the ninjas.
- Quentin (portrayed by Matthew Gumley) is a science nerd and Owen's friend. In "Enter the Dojo", he is given the knowledge of the ninjas' secret identity and swears to secrecy as Owen gives him the moniker "Kid Q". He is the one to help fix the dojo, repair Yamato, and help re-enable Hologramps at the dojo.

=== Main villains ===
- Ishina: A rival ninja clan to the Fukunaga clan, who seek a weapon known as the Floating Sword. They "kidnap" Connor, but this was a set-up, and Connor is revealed to be their leader, who serves a more powerful master: Grandpa Fukanaga's evil twin brother Kagema. He finds out that Mike, Owen, and Amanda are ninjas in "Quake". They appear again in "Cousin Connor", where Connor tries to get the ninjas to turn on themselves. However, Mike learns that Connor is one of the Ishina and that he tricked them, leading to a battle that ends in Kagema defeating the ninjas and escaping with Connor. Connor manages to get hold of Mike's medallion and uses it to get into the dojo, where he intends to relieve Mike of the Floating Sword.
- Connor (portrayed by Brandon Soo Hoo) is Mike's cousin and the grandson of Mike's grandfather's sister (great-aunt), who is the co-leader of the Ishina. Along with the Ishina, he seeks to take the Floating Sword back from the Fukanaga family to create a powerful weapon to attempt world domination and enact revenge on the members of the Fukanaga family. At the end of the first season, in the episode "Cousin Connor," he stole Mike's mon, which he used to open the secret entrance to the dojo. After his infiltration attempt is thwarted, he tricks the ninjas into thinking that the Ishina were holding his parents hostage to try and take out the trio. However, he is foiled again and sent to Madagascar in a shipping crate.
- Kagema Fukanaga (portrayed by George Takei) is Hologramps' evil twin brother and Mike's great uncle, who is the current leader of the Ishina clan. He was entrusted to protect the Floating Sword, but betrayed his family and attempted to steal it, only to be thwarted by his brother. He manages to take out the ninjas and escapes with Connor. In "Grounded Ninja", it is revealed that he needs the Floating Sword to complete his ultimate weapon, a robotic ninja named "Hakaisha - The One Who Destroys". In the episode "The Floating Sword", he was defeated by Mike and Connor, but Kagema kidnaps Mike and escapes.
- The Rhymer (portrayed by Christopher Reid) is a villain who rhymes when speaking and robbed places whose names rhymed with each other. He was pursued by the Supah Ninjas in the pilot episode; after his minions were defeated by Mike and Owen and arrested, the Rhymer escaped after being furious that nothing rhymes with "orange".
- Katara (portrayed by Sydney Tamiia Poitier) is a knife-throwing cat burglar who stole priceless antiquities. She started dating Mike's father in order to break into a museum he was guarding, and managed to escape before the ninjas could capture her.
- Harland Mauzer / Two-Ton Harley (portrayed by Paul Wight) is an overweight biker who ate a lot of food to gain weight and reunite with his old gang, the Wrecking Crew. He was taken out by the Ninjas and was recaptured at the end of the episode, being the first villain who was actually captured by the ninjas. He returns in "Enter the Dojo", when Quentin releases him from prison thinking that the ninjas wanted to face off against their biggest enemy. He breaks into the Food Rodeo and intends to reunite his crew and break down the city, but is defeated by the ninjas with the aid of Mike's father, Martin.
- Nicholias Spaski / Checkmate (portrayed by Rick D. Wasserman) is an "undefeated" chess prodigy who cheats and uses elaborate traps to gain the advantage and win. He returns in "Eternum", where he escapes from prison.
- Red-Eye (portrayed by Scott Lowell) A former biology teacher at Benjamin Rush High School, Mr. Bradford became a bug-like monster whom Owen calls "Red-Eye" after he experimented on himself to try to find a universal cure for disease. He uses his newly acquired abilities to break into his old workplace and obtain the necessary items to create a cure. After finding the cure, Bradford uses it to cure Amanda's infection rather than his own.
- Jellyface: Frankie Fellows used Plasma 17 to disguise himself as the people who got him arrested and have them suffer as much as he did, before being defeated by Mike. He returns in "Detention", where he kidnaps and impersonates Mike to smash the trophy case so he can get into the school on Saturday, where Martin was going to be during homecoming. He planned to plant a bomb and a tank of poison gas in order to get revenge on Mike and Martin. His plan was foiled when Owen took him out during a battle, with Mike and Amanda defusing the bomb. He is seemingly aware of the ninjas' identities.
- Malleni the Magnificent (portrayed by Vince Corazza) is a skilled magician who faked his own kidnapping to frame both his assistant Veronica, and his rival, Dominic the Magnificent. He was stopped when he was kicked into a magic box by Owen, which split him into three pieces, with him vowing vengeance on the Supah Ninjas.
- Charles White / Quake (portrayed by Esteban Cueto) is a forger of music boxes who uses special metal gloves that allow him to work with hot metal. After his employer died, Charles sought to collect the music boxes that he had made. However, every time he got his hands on one, he accidentally crushed it, causing him to break out into a rage. Amanda helped him take off his gloves and gave him a music box, after which he leaves peacefully.
- Skeleton Crew: A secret society who ties with Benjamin Rush High School. They leave hidden messages by leaving behind a key and a strip of paper which is decoded by being wrapped around the key. They seek a hard drive for an unknown reason, but are defeated by the ninjas and arrested. However, their return is implied when Amanda and Mike find a message wanting revenge from their leader, the Skeleton King.
- Flint Forster (portrayed by Cody Christian) is a villain who steals from the rich and gives to charity, like a modern-day Robin Hood, along with his group. He seems to have an interest in Amanda, and leaves her his necklace before escaping. He returns in "Finding Forster", where he discovers Amanda's identity in a debate at Benjamin Rush High. They are taken hostage by Flint's debate team when he stole a suitcase filled with credit cards. After Mike and Owen show up and defeat the debate team, Flint says goodbye to Amanda before leaving. He returns again in "Spring Fling", where he finds Amanda and asks her to the Spring Fling dance; however, he discovers that Chop Shop seeks revenge on him, and Amanda learns that Flint stole from him. Flint escapes, but Amanda is captured. He soon discovers that Mike and Owen are the other ninjas after they return to the garage and defeat Chop Shop and his crew, and Flint decides to call the police himself. He is the second villain to have a close relationship with a main character.

=== Minor villains ===
- Subsiders: A crew that lived in the shadows of abandoned subway tunnels. Every time a new member joins, they give them a new name. The crew included Subsider (Christopher Kien Dao), Moth (Xin Sarith Wuku), Toad (Victor Lopez), Roach (Gabriel Nunez), Rat (Caine Sinclair), and Viper (Ramses Jimenez), with Owen's friend James (Jonny Weston) once being part of the crew. They wear hoodies and white masks and rob trucks full of valuable items, such as money. They attempted to escape, but were defeated by Mike and Amanda, with Viper being defeated by Owen.
- Komodo (portrayed by Bryan Friday): A former assistant to Cameron's father, Dr. Theodore Anton wanted revenge for being double-crossed by Vanderhaussen. He wears a large dragon helmet and uses an atomic flamethrower to burn down buildings.
- Dollhouse (portrayed by Tyler Poelle) captured people and put mind control devices around their necks so they would act like moving dolls. Towards the climax of the episode, Mike finds that Dollhouse never had any friends and had a lonely childhood, which influenced his evil plan. He is defeated when he attempts to shoot Mike with tranquilizer darts, but is subdued after Mike catches one and throws it at Dollhouse's hand.
- X (portrayed by Christopher Maleki) is a skilled assassin from the mob that sought to kill the person Mike's father was protecting. He was identified by the X-shaped scar on the back of his neck. He was disguised at the train conductor and took control of the train leading to a Sci-Fi convention.
- House of Lords: A British crime group led by Sir Nigel Wickett, whose members wield cricket paddles. They were after Kickbutt (Lucas Cruikshank) after he stole their money, but are defeated by the ninjas and Kickbutt. Two of their members are portrayed by Mark Lindsay Chapman and Ray Park.
- Morningstar Academy: A boarding school where the headmistress, Ms. Morningstar (Paulette P. Williams), turns troubled girls into skilled thieves who rob for her and are wanted in several countries. These thieves included Clarissa (Daniella Monet), Fiona (Allison Caetano), and Bethany (Kiralee Hayashi), who are defeated by Amanda.
- DJ Elephant Head (portrayed by Ryan Higa) - Real name Leslie, he is a former student at Benjamin Rush High School who was seemingly expelled. He used his musical rhythms to make people fall asleep so he could steal a rare diamond called the Eye of India, while also seeking revenge on the school. He battles Owen, but is knocked out with his sleeping disk playing and his minions accidentally knock each other out. DJ Elephant Head, the villain's artist name, is a spoof of the progressive house producer Deadmau5.
- Snakeskin (portrayed by Amy Lucas) is Benjamin Rush's guidance counselor. Her actual name is Susie Scott, who lived a double life as a villainess who was using devil diamond snake venom to make popular kids' skin shed, as she was bullied by popular kids in her childhood. She planned to use toxic poison in Melanie's party, but was defeated by Amanda.
- Dr. Eternum (portrayed by Todd Stashwick) is a demented psychiatrist who believes that he can manipulate human nature using the word "Gemini". He captures Mike and attempts to convert him to evil, but is defeated.
- Mechanov (portrayed by Curt Lowens) is an evil scientist who believes that the only way humankind can evolve is through machines, having saved his children, Optic and Buzzsaw (portrayed by Dennis Keiffer and Danielle Burgio) from an explosion by turning them into cyborgs. During his final battle with Mike's grandfather, his lab exploded and he was assumed dead; however, he is revealed to have survived, but fallen in a coma. When he comes of age and begins to die, his children attempt to steal purple diamonds that can power an exoskeleton in order to save his life, but are defeated by the Fukunagas. Mechanov's exoskeleton, with him in it, was defeated by Owen, before being finished off by Martin.
- Lemuel Lightner / Limelight (portrayed by Danny Masterson) is a villain who went to college and performed drama with three celebrities. Resenting the fact that they became famous when he did not, he kidnapped them and attempted to kill them so that he could become famous. However, he is defeated by Owen, while his henchmen are taken out by Mike and Amanda.
- William Block / Frostbite (portrayed by Steve Monroe) is a villain whose family used to own the Lickety Splits ice cream company. However, they were robbed and locked in a freezer, where they all caught frostbite and Block lost a finger. Seeking vengeance, he kidnapped criminals by freezing them and keeping them prisoner in his old factory instead of handing them over to the police. He tried to freeze Amanda when she found out his secret, but she was able to defeat him when she threw a shuriken at a liquid nitrogen tank, freezing him.
- Shadow Fly (portrayed by Bobb'e J. Thompson) claims that he is one of the ninjas that stops the villains of Empire City. He tricks the ninjas into thinking that he was kidnapped so that he can capture them, but is exposed as being an imposter after the ninjas stick him to a billboard.
- Wesley (portrayed by Kevin M. Horton) is the science assistant of Dr. Warner Krowsa. Tired of listening to Dr. Krowsa's insults and waiting for him to invent something worth stealing, he stole a telekinesis helmet that allows the wearer to move things with his mind. He tries to destroy Quentin, but was stopped by Mike, Owen, and Amanda.
- Kylie Coors (portrayed by Ciara Bravo) once went to go to cheer camp with Amanda, but was sent to juvy after she stole money from the camp and Amanda found out and told the coaches. She later returns, being named the cheerleader captain of another school. During Spirit Week, she comes to Benjamin Rush and plays nice to mess with Amanda and make people not like her and think that she is crazy. She tricks Amanda into coming to the tunnels, putting blue prints in Amanda's locker to frame her for attempting to blow up the gym, but is defeated by Amanda.
- Trip Taylor (portrayed by Glenn McCuen) is a credit card counterfeiter, who kidnapped Flint and Amanda before being defeated by Mike.
- Gina / Wallflower (portrayed by Jillian Rose Reed) had a crush on Owen, which he did not notice due to having a crush on Paloma Peru. She kidnaps him and tries to change her look to get him to be with her. However, she is defeated after accidentally locking herself in a box.
- M@yhem: A group of internet kids led by new student Tyler, who have been cyberbullied because of internet videos of them gone wrong, and attempt to cause riots to get people to cause mayhem before Tyler is defeated by Owen.
- Chop Shop (portrayed by Sam Turich) is a mobster who has a crime ring and uses his garage as a cover. Flint Forster steals from him and wants revenge on him. He kidnapped Amanda to get Flint to come back, but is defeated by the ninjas and Flint.

== Production ==
On September 30, 2010, Nickelodeon announced that it had ordered 26 episodes of the series, which was slated to begin production in Los Angeles for a 2011 premiere. Initially, the series was planned to star YouTube comedian Ryan Higa as the lead character Mike Fukanaga. In an update video posted to his channel on July 16, 2011, Ryan Higa explained, "The reason why I turned it down is because they wanted me to remove my YouTube videos."

On May 7, 2013, it was announced that the series would not return for a third season. Chris Breakwell, owner of the show's production facility 31st Street Studios, stated "Nickelodeon liked it but they're going in a different direction."

== Episodes ==
=== Season 1 (2011–12) ===
No. overall	No. in season	Title	Directed by	Written by	Original release date	Prod. code	US viewers (millions)
1	1	"Pilot"	Clark Mathis	Leo Chu & Eric S. Garcia	January 17, 2011	101	2.5
Mike and Owen find a secret lair under Mike's bed and have to become ninjas. The ninjas have to face a villain named The Rhymer (Christopher Reid). He kidnaps Amanda McKay. Owen and Mike have to fight against him to rescue Amanda. At the end of the episode, Amanda joins them as being ninjas after she was saved. Co-stars: Lateef Crowder as Bass, Michelle Lee as Melody, Sam Looc as Treble, Karen Strassman as Various (voice) (uncredited)
2	2	"Katara"	Lev L. Spiro	Nat Bernstein & Mitchel Katlin	April 16, 2011	104	3.1
The ninjas must stop a cat burglar named Katara Sharp (Sydney Tamiia Poitier) who just happens to be dating Mike's dad (Randall Park). Mike and Amanda kiss when undercover and Mike is having trouble controlling his feelings for Amanda. Amanda seems upset after hearing Mike saying it was just business, but Mike didn't mean that he just said that because he didn't want Amanda to know that he liked it and he felt it was right because he thought Amanda's kiss was just business. Co-star: Damon Christopher as Security Guard
3	3	"Two Ton Harley"	Clark Mathis	Leo Chu & Eric S. Garcia	April 23, 2011	102	2.9
The ninjas are surprised to find that a motorcycle gang member named Two Ton Harley (Big Show) has escaped from his prison cell with the hopes of being sent to another prison to reunite with his old gang. Co-stars: Edwin H. Bravo as Hog, Brandon Molale as Actor WWE Superstar Big Show guest stars
4	4	"Checkmate"	Clark Mathis	Leo Chu & Eric S. Garcia	April 30, 2011	103	2.1
The ninjas take on a chess prodigy villain named Checkmate (Rick D. Wasserman) who challenges them in chess-related games, putting their lives in danger. Amanda feels she must overachieve at other things after getting her first A−, the worst grade she has ever received in her life, especially when Checkmate captures Mike and Owen threatening to kill them.
5	5	"Subsiders"	Kevin Fair	Drew Hancock	May 7, 2011	106	2.9
Owen is having a hard time with the boring discipline of Grandpa's teachings. When he recognizes that an old friend (Jonny Weston) is part of the dangerous Subsiders parkour crew, Owen infiltrates their underground lair to save him. Meanwhile, Mike and Amanda cope with the temporary loss of their partner and friend. Note: At the end, when everybody is arrested the building behind them is the same one that is used as Rocque Records on Big Time Rush.
6	6	"Mr. Bradford"	Jonathan Judge	Drew Hancock	May 14, 2011	108	2.9
Amanda's favorite teacher, Mr. Bradford (Scott Lowell), who used to work for a major pharmaceutical company, has been experimenting on himself with insect DNA in order to find a universal antidote. He accidentally takes too much and turns into a monster. Meanwhile, Mike's annoying cousin Connor (Brandon Soo Hoo) stays over for a few days.
7	7	"Komodo"	Paul Shapiro	Lisa Parsons	June 4, 2011	107	TBA
A dragon-masked eco-terrorist (Bryan Friday) seeks revenge against Arthur Vanderhausen, a large commercial developer with a shady environmental record. Meanwhile, Amanda falls for Arthur's son Cameron (Jordan Nichols).
8	8	"Jelly Face"	Alex Winter	Lon Diamond	June 4, 2011	110	TBA
Mike and the gang are suspicious when unlikely suspects turn bad, including one of Mike's own uncles. Meanwhile, Connor is filming everyone doing embarrassing things for his made-up show, "Conn'd."
9	9	"Dollhouse"	David Jackson	Leo Chu & Eric S. Garcia	June 25, 2011	111	2.6
Amanda is captured by a villain named "Dollhouse" (Tyler Poelle) who turns people into "living dolls". While Mike and Owen are trying to rescue her, Owen gets turned into a personal doll, too. It is revealed that Dollhouse is the son of the maker of Speelmachers, a famous toy company. He captures others because it is said he had no playmates when he was a kid.
10	10	"X"	Alex Winter	David Ihlenfeld & Dave Wright	July 23, 2011	115	2.0
X (Christopher Maleki), an assassin hired by the mob, is trying to kill a boy (Michael Blaiklock) with smart computer skills that Mike's dad is protecting.
11	11	"Kickbutt"	Jonathan Judge	Ben Acker & Ben Blacker	September 10, 2011	114	2.4
A computer geek leads a double life as a super hero named Kickbutt (Lucas Cruikshank), but his alter ego gets in trouble when he steals a mob boss' (Mark Lindsay Chapman) money and uses it to renovate the computer lab at school. At the end of the episode he states "Until next time!" hinting a return.
12	12	"The Magnificent"	Jon Rosenbaum	Lisa Parsons	September 17, 2011	116	2.3
Mike and Owen revive their old childhood magic act, "The Amazing Owenini and Friend," in order to go undercover at the Magic Castle to uncover the truth about famous magician's (Vince Corazza) disappearance. Meanwhile, Amanda tries to have a proper date with her boyfriend Cameron, but he is thinking she has feelings for Owen. Whenever they attempt to have a date, its always ruined by either Mike or Owen.
13	13	"Morningstar Academy"	Jonathan Judge	Lisa Parsons	September 24, 2011	113	2.3
A group of thieves named Clarissa (Daniella Monet), Bethany (Kiralee Hayashi) and Fiona are disguised as prep-school girls who want to become rich by stealing printing plates for $100 bills. And Amanda must put her predictability to the test. Victorious star Daniella Monet guest stars
14	14	"DJ Elephant Head"	Clark Mathis	David Ihlenfeld & Dave Wright	October 1, 2011	121	2.3
Owen is in a crime-fighting slump, so Mike and Amanda try to cheer him up by taking him to a concert at the school by their favorite DJ (Ryan Higa). But soon, they realize DJ Elephant Head is a criminal! The song "Rabba Rabba" from the 2001 Bollywood movie Aks appeared in the show.
15	15	"Snakeskin"	Alex Winter	Lisa Parsons	October 10, 2011	122	1.9
Amanda struggles with popularity after she isn't invited to Melanie's party, but she soon gets invited thanks to Kelly; however, Owen is throwing a party on the same night, so Amanda attends both. Meanwhile, the ninjas fight a villain known as Snakeskin who is really their attractive guidance counselor, Ms. Scott (Amy Lucas), who is stealing Devil Diamond Snakes and plans to use their venom as revenge on the popular kids at Melanie's party. With all the kids locked in with a canister of the venom, it's up to Amanda to save them.
16	16	"Eternum"	David Barrett	David Ihlenfeld & Dave Wright	October 15, 2011	112	1.9
A demented psychiatrist (Todd Stashwick) lures the ninjas to an asylum to test his theory that he has the power to turn good into evil. While investigating, Amanda meets Checkmate again, who in the end of the episode escapes with a message to the Supah Ninjas: "Game on, Ninjas!"
17–18	17–18	"Ishina"	Brian Robbins	Leo Chu & Eric S. Garcia (Part 1); Nat Bernstein & Mitchel Katlin (Part 2)	October 29, 2011	117–118	1.8
In the first two-part episode of the series, The evil Ishina clan tries to find the dojo; Mike learns that he must protect the floating sword from the Ishina. We also find out Connor's secret: he's the leader of the Ishina clan. And the brother of the Hologramps is found. He is the "teacher" of Connor. Co-Star: Power Rangers star Johnny Yong Bosch as Master Shin
19	19	"Quake"	Dave Payne	Drew Hancock	November 5, 2011	119	TBA
With Owen and Amanda's advice, Mike finally asks Julie out, only to learn right after that Amanda and Cameron have broken up. Meanwhile, Quake, a giant, beast of a man, has been tearing apart Empire City. At the end of the episode hologramps' twin brother and Connor just find out that Mike, Amanda and Owen were the three ninjas not Martin.
20	20	"Mechanov"	David Jackson	David Ihlenfeld & David Wright	November 12, 2011	105	2.3
Mike goes on a police ride-along with Martin. A villainous brother named Optic (Dennis Keiffer) and his sister Buzzsaw (Danielle Burgio) the duo steal purple diamonds around the city to bring their dying father called Mechanov (Curt Lowens) back to life as a robot. Note: This episode premiered on Nick UK before the US release. The UK release was in September 2011.
21	21	"Detention"	Dave Payne	David Ihlenfeld & David Wright	November 19, 2011	123	1.8
The ninjas end up in detention and discover Jellyface escaped from prison. Now against one another, they try to figure out who's Jellyface before it's too late. Amanda lies that she got detention to do a report for the school paper, but she really keeps falling asleep in first period because of the gang's late night "Study Group" (AKA Ninja Training), so Mike suggests they move Study Group to lunch, and Owen and Amanda realize who Jellyface is.
22	22	"Skeleton Crew"	Hiro Koda	Edward J. Bedrosian	December 27, 2011	124	N/A
A string of burglaries have occurred and Mike is convinced the Skeleton Crew, an underground secret society with ties to Benjamin Rush High School, is to blame. Yet Amanda and Owen are doubtful of Mike's accusations since he's a staunch believer of urban myths. Owen desperately tries to woo Isabelle, a new Junior transfer, but has no idea she's actually an undercover detective who's also pursuing the Skeleton Crew. She also believes that the Supah Ninjas are the ones behind the attacks at Benjamin Rush High School. When Isabelle goes to the school with backup, they unmask the ninjas, which actually turns out to be the Skeleton Crew (The Supah Ninjas switched masks with them before Isabelle and Martin arrived). The next day, Mike is now Owen's wingman, for a girl named Greta. Mike and Amanda find a note which meant "This isn't over. S.K. (Skeleton King)" meaning the Skeleton Crew may appear in future episodes. Note: Even though Hologramps didn't appear in this episode, he is voiced when Mike makes a voice reenactment of him while remembering about his goal on defeating an enemy. It is also revealed that Mike can do perfect voice impressions.
23	23	"Limelight"	Tim Story	Lon Diamond	January 7, 2012	109	1.5
Limelight (Danny Masterson), a former college actor, kidnaps his former cast mates, who have become famous, and has horrible plans for them. Meanwhile, Owen has trouble hiding his ninja skills and almost exposes his friends and himself twice, once while trying to defend a boy from a shifty-looking senior student who was actually selling cupcakes to raise money for children's hospitals and when Limelight captures his final target. Mike and Amanda scold him afterward but Hologramps takes pity on Owen because he was trying to do the right thing, he also knows how he feels about not receiving enough attention and not getting credit for helping to save Empire City, but he tells him that a ninja's strength comes from within, not the opinion of others. But will Owen's recent idea of trying to stand out help the ninjas defeat Limelight? That '70s Show star Danny Masterson guest stars
24	24	"Frostbite"	David Jackson	Lon Diamond	January 14, 2012	120	2.0
A man named Frostbite (Steve Monroe) starts to capture criminals and do the ninjas' work for them. But Amanda gets suspicious of him when she finds out the police still think they're on the loose. Meanwhile, Amanda tries to help Mike get ready for his date with Julie, telling him about the "hand touch" in which if a girl touches your shoulders she likes you, on your arm, her feelings may change, and on the hand is that she like likes you. While Mike practices what he's gonna say to Julie, she doesn't realize he's actually talking about herself, and once he finishes, she touches his hand and says, "Perfect." After Mike looks down at their hands, Amanda removes her hand, says she has to go, then walks out of the door as quickly as possible. Mike goes on his first date with Julie, with Owen giving him advice through an earpiece. But, he does not realize that Amanda is in trouble when she goes to Frostbite's hideout and finds that he is holding the criminals hostage instead of turning them over to the police, but will running away from Frostbite help Amanda stop him when he traps her in the freezer?
25	25	"Ninja Intervention"	Brian Robbins	Lisa Parsons	January 21, 2012	125	1.8
Tensions flare after Grandfather traps Mike, Owen and Amanda in the dojo to stage an intervention, realizing they've forgotten the true meaning of being Ninjas. Through flashbacks and clips, the Ninjas work out their dilemma of whether or not to go public after Grandfather tells them they've been captured battling a villain on a security camera. After Amanda and Owen want to go public and Mike doesn't, just because it's two against one, they decide to go public. But when they only can have one, Amanda, Mike, and Owen all think that they should be the one. After it is Mike, Grandfather says that not all the tallys have been counted, they do a breathing exercise to reflect on what all has gone on in their ninja lives. Grandfather says that there is no i in ninja to which Amanda keeps complaining about. They then decide to not go public, after their final decision Mike asks "Grandfather, we weren't really caught on tape, were we?" to which Grandfather doesn't answer but it is implied that the answer is yes.
26	26	"Cousin Connor"	Jonathan Judge	Leo Chu & Eric S. Garcia	January 28, 2012	126	2.0
Mike's cousin, Connor, returns to Empire City to obtain the floating sword and set up a trap to the ninjas. Mike discovers Connor's identity as an Ishina. He also discovers that his grandfather's twin brother Kagema, who has betrayed the Fukanagas and has now returned to lead the Ishina. In a fight with Connor, Mike loses his mon to him, and the episode ends with Connor inserting the mon into the Supah Ninjas' dojo entrance in Mike's bedroom and it opens up in front of him with Mike, Amanda, Owen and Hologramps looking in despair. Meanwhile, Mike is upset, thinking that Amanda and Owen have a thing for each other, after Connor tells him they are into each other. Connor tells Owen that Amanda bleaches her hair, and he tells Amanda that Owen likes her.

=== Season 2 (2013) ===
No. overall	No. in season	Title	Directed by	Written by	Original release date	Prod. code	US viewers (millions)
27	1	"The Con Man"	Alex Winter	Leo Chu & Eric S. Garcia	February 9, 2013	201	N/A
Cousin Connor plans to infiltrate the dojo, and after he fails, the Supah Ninjas must get back Mike's mon. While trying to the first time, Connor tricks them into thinking that the only reason he's trying to take them down is because Kagema Fukanaga is holding his parents hostage. But while fighting the Ishina, and after realizing that Connor was lying since he's fighting them too, they push Connor into a cargo box. It sent him to Madagascar, after getting Mike's mon back of course.
28	2	"Flint Forster"	David Barrett	Heather Flanders	February 16, 2013	205	1.2
Amanda falls for a criminal called Flint Forster while on ninja duty. Meanwhile, Julie breaks up with Mike and Owen tries to fix Mike by testing him to see if Amanda likes him. Guest Star: Cody Christian as Flint Forster Note: Flint Forester is a reference to the Marvel Character Hawkeye (Clint Barton), an archer whose real name is Clint Barton.
29	3	"Shadow Fly"	Clark Mathis	Lanny Horn & Josh Silverstein	February 23, 2013	203	1.4
A photo of Owen in his ninja suit (beating a bad guy) goes viral. But an imposter steps up and pretends to be the Supah Ninjas, takes all the credit, and starts to sell T-shirts, hats, and jack-in-the-boxes. Meanwhile, Mike tries to find a new style to lose the nickname 'Necklace Guy', but in the end Mike figures out that his thing IS 'Necklace Guy'. Guest Star: Bobb'e J. Thompson as Shadow Fly
30	4	"Grounded Ninja"	Clark Mathis	Kristofor Brown	March 2, 2013	202	1.3
When Mike is grounded after his father catches him sneaking out, Mike has to find a way to help Owen and Amanda stop the Ishina and Kagema Fukanaga from finding the dojo.
31	5	"Kid Q"	Dave Payne	Mike Alber & Gabe Snyder	March 9, 2013	204	1.6
When Amanda and Mike pair up in the science fair, Owen gets stuck with Quentin as a science fair partner. Quentin does all the work and gets his project stolen from an evil scientist's assistant.
32	6	"Cheer Fever"	Dave Payne	Ray Lancon	March 16, 2013	206	1.4
During Spirit week, a rival cheerleader from Amanda's past named Kylie Coors is released from juvie and visits Benjamin Rush. Amanda doesn't trust her because she knows that she's up to something, so Owen and Mike go undercover as cheerleaders to find out what she's planning. Guest Star: Big Time Rush star Ciara Bravo as Kylie
33	7	"The Ishina Strike Back"	Alex Winter	Mike Alber & Gabe Snyder	March 30, 2013	207	N/A
Mike throws a last minute birthday party for his dad Martin, but The Ishina strike back to try and steal the floating sword. In the end Grandpa is disabled and Yamato and the dojo are destroyed, and to repair it the ninjas bring in Quentin and expose their identities to him.
34	8	"Enter the Dojo"	Lev L. Spiro	Heather Flanders	April 6, 2013	208	1.3
After the dojo is destroyed, the ninjas must expose their identities to Quentin and have him fix the dojo, but he overstates his welcome and lets Two-Ton Harley out of prison.
35	9	"Finding Forster "	Lev L. Spiro	Heather Flanders	April 13, 2013	211	N/A
Flint Forster returns and learns Amanda's real identity; Mike must rescue Flint and Amanda when they are taken hostage. In the end, Mike realizes he still has feelings for Amanda. Guest Star: Cody Christian as Flint Forster Note: This episode is a reference to Marvel's The Avengers as they have shawarma quietly in the end on the episode.
36	10	"Wallflower"	Clark Mathis	Edward J. Bedrosian	April 20, 2013	209	1.5
Owen pursues his crush on Paloma Peru, but gets captured by a girl who likes him; Mike and Amanda bond while filming an audition tape for a game show. Note: Wallflower is a spoof of Poison Ivy from Batman.
37	11	"M@yhem"	Dave Payne	Josh Silverstein & Lanny Horn	April 20, 2013	210	1.2
The Ninjas investigate a social media star who uses flash mobs to incite chaos; Paloma grows suspicious of the ninjas.
38	12	"Spring Fling"	Dave Payne	Unknown	April 27, 2013	212	1.3
Mike is left broken hearted when he misses his chance to ask Amanda to the dance. Instead she goes with Flint. To make matters worse, Flint reveals that Amanda is going to study abroad in Paris with him for the summer! In the end, Amanda decides to stay there with Mike and finds out that Mike still has feelings for her. Guest Star: Cody Christian as Flint Forster
39	13	"The Floating Sword"	Hiro Koda	Unknown	April 27, 2013	213	1.1
Mike's Cousin Connor returns as a spy and learns that the Kata is the key to finding the floating sword. He tries to retrieve it, but Mike defeats him and takes the sword. At the dojo, Quentin manages to fix Grandpa. In the last scene, Owen realizes that Amanda likes Mike. Mike goes to his locker and finds his grandpa's brother, who kidnaps Mike ending the series with Kagema flying off with Mike.

== Awards and nominations ==
Year	Award	Category	Recipient	Result	Ref.
2012	Writers Guild of America	Children's - Episodic & Specials	Episode: Hero of the Shadows	Won	
2013	65th Primetime Creative Arts Emmy Awards	Outstanding Stunt Coordination for a Comedy Series or a Variety Program	Hiro Koda	Won	
