= Jake Weary =

American actor (born 1990)

- Born: Jacob Weary; February 14, 1990 (age 36); Trenton, New Jersey, U.S.
- Occupation: Actor
- Years active: 2002–present
- Spouse: Vera Bulder (m. 2019)
- Children: 1
- Parent(s): A.C. Weary; Kim Zimmer

Jacob Weary (born February 14, 1990) is an American actor. He is known for starring as Deran Cody in the TNT drama series Animal Kingdom (2016–2022). Other notable roles include his run as Luke Snyder in the CBS soap opera As the World Turns (2005), Vince Keeler in NBC's action-drama series Chicago Fire (2014), and in horror films It Follows (2014) and It Chapter Two (2019). As of 2025, he stars in the Netflix series The Waterfront.

== Early life ==
Weary was born in Trenton, New Jersey, to Daytime Emmy Award-winning actress Kim Zimmer and actor and director Allen Cudney "A.C." Weary.

== Career ==
Weary's first acting roles included a guest appearance on the long-running CBS soap opera Guiding Light in 2002, in which his mother, actress Kim Zimmer, portrayed Reva Shayne. After guest appearances on Law & Order: Special Victims Unit and Listen Up, he was cast as Luke Snyder on another of CBS's long-running soaps, As the World Turns. He would remain with the show until December 2005, when actor Van Hansis stepped into the role after Weary left to focus on his schoolwork.

After making his film debut as a hall monitor in Assassination of a High School President in 2008, Weary has since appeared as Sal in Kaare Anderson's 2010 film Altitude and Hugh in the 2014 horror-thriller It Follows.

Weary starred as Deran Cody in the TNT criminal drama Animal Kingdom, based on the 2010 Australian film of the same name.

== Personal life ==
Weary graduated from Montclair Kimberley Academy in 2008. Weary married his longtime girlfriend Vera Bulder in 2019. They have one child.

== Filmography ==
=== Film ===
Year	Title	Role	Notes
2008	Assassination of a High School President	Hall Monitor	
2010	Altitude	Sal	
2014	Zombeavers	Tommy	
2014	It Follows	Hugh / Jeff Redmond	
2016	Message from the King	Bill	
2017	Tomato Red	Sammy	
2017	Smartass	Mickey	
2019	Finding Steve McQueen	Tommy Barber	
2019	It Chapter Two	John "Webby" Garton	
2021	The Ultimate Playlist of Noise	Benjie	
2021	The Birthday Cake	Agent Pete	
2021	Rushed	Steven Croission	
2022	How to Blow Up a Pipeline	Dwayne	
2022	Measure of Revenge	Curtis Cooper	
2022	Alone at Night	Jake	
2023	Bleeding Love	Kip	
2024	Trigger Warning	Elvis Swann	
2024	Oh, Canada	Stanley	

=== Television ===
Year	Title	Role	Notes
2003	Guiding Light	Jake	1 episode
2004	Law & Order: Special Victims Unit	Shane Madden	Episode: "Head"
2004	Listen Up	Slacker Kid	Episode: "Grandmaster of the Wolfhunt"
2005	As the World Turns	Luke Snyder	60 episodes
2005	Law & Order: Criminal Intent	Tim Stenton	Episode: "In the Wee Small Hours"
2005	Testing Bob	Harris	Television movie
2005	Party Planner with David Tutera	Himself	Episode: "Meet the Soap Stars"
2009	Three Rivers	T.J. Russo	Episode: "Where We Lie"
2010	Fred: The Movie	Kevin Lebow	Television movie
2011	Fred 2: Night of the Living Fred	Kevin Lebow	Television movie
2012	Fred 3: Camp Fred	Kevin Lebow	Television movie
2012	Fred: The Show	Kevin Lebow	Main cast
2013	Escape from Polygamy	Micah	Television movie
2014	Chicago Fire	Vince Keeler	Episodes: "Keep Your Mouth Shut", "Virgin Skin", "Tonight's the Night"
2014	Stalker	Bobby Hughes	Episode: "The Haunting"
2014–2015	Pretty Little Liars	Cyrus Petrillo	Recurring role (season 5; 4 episodes)
2015	A Deadly Adoption	Dwayne Tisdale	Television movie
2016–2022	Animal Kingdom	Deran Cody	Main cast
2025	The Walking Dead: Dead City	Christos	Episodes: "Power Equals Power", "The Bird Always Knows"
2025	The Waterfront	Cane Buckley	Main role
TBA	Rose Hill	West Belmont	Filming; main role

=== Web ===
Year	Title	Role	Notes
2011–2012	It's Fred	Kevin (voice)	
