= Brian Robbins =

American film producer (born 1963)

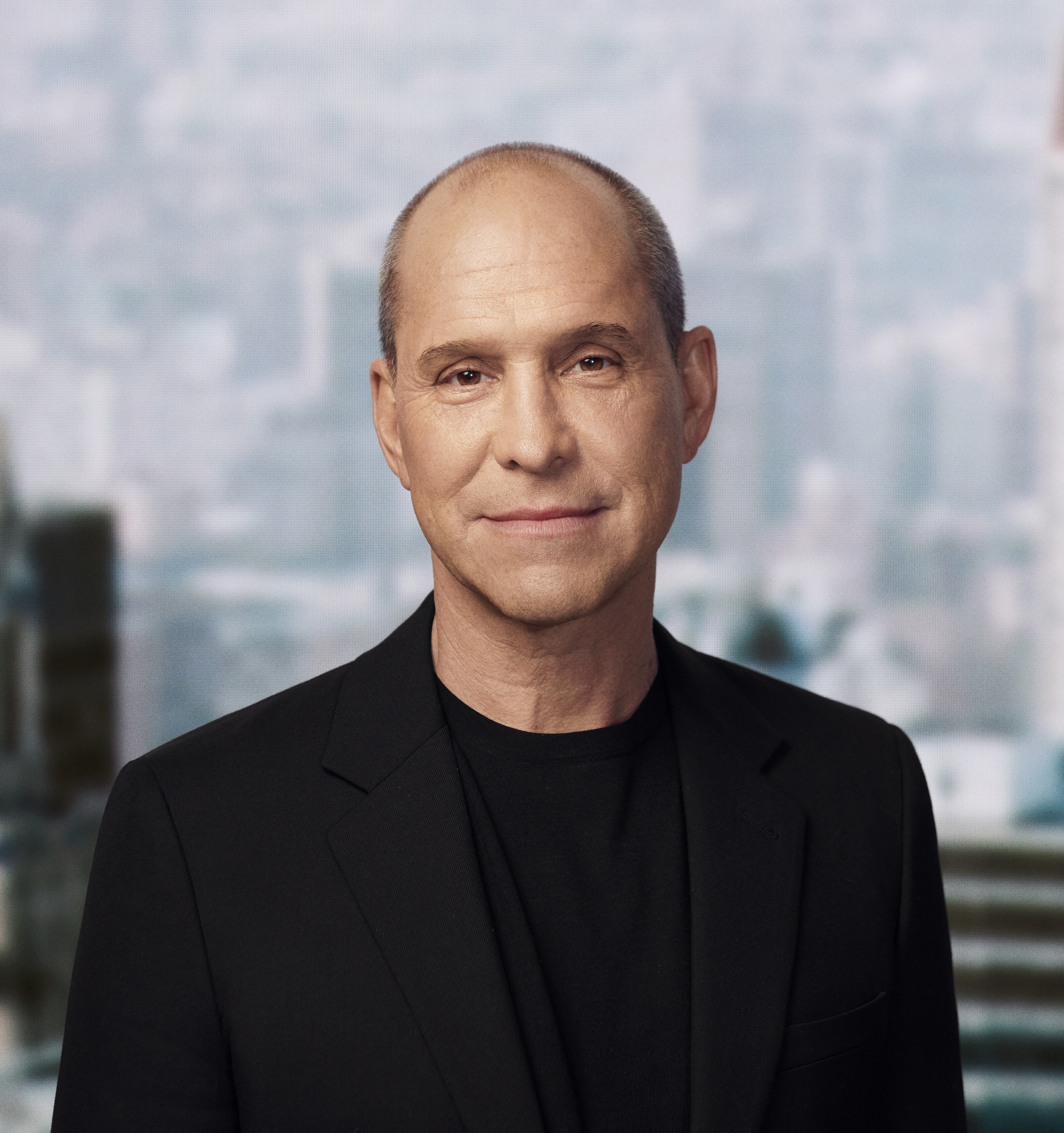
- Robbins in 2019
- Born: Brian Levine; November 22, 1963 (age 62); New York City, U.S.
- Education: Grant High School
- Occupations: Film producer; director; actor; businessman
- Years active: 1982–present
- Spouses: Laura Cathcart (div. 2013) Tracy Robbins (m. 2014)
- Children: 3
- Father: Floyd Levine

Brian Robbins (né Levine; November 22, 1963) is an American film producer, director, and studio executive. He was the co-CEO of Paramount Global from 2024 to 2025; President and chief executive officer of Paramount Pictures and Nickelodeon from 2021 to 2025 and 2018 to 2025 respectively; and Chief Content Officer, Movies & Kids & Family, Paramount+ until his departure from the company after the completion of the merger between Paramount Global and Skydance Media.

As President & CEO of Paramount Pictures, Robbins oversaw the filmed entertainment division's creative strategy and worldwide business operations including Paramount Pictures, Paramount Animation, Paramount Home Entertainment, Paramount Pictures International, Paramount Licensing Inc., and Paramount Studio Group.

In early 2026, he founded the entertainment company Big Shot Pictures, with backing from Sony Pictures.

== Early life ==
Robbins was born on November 22, 1963 in New York City and raised in the Marine Park, Brooklyn, neighborhood. Robbins was born to a Jewish family.

His father was the actor Floyd Levine. When he was 14, he moved with his family to Los Angeles. He graduated from Grant High School in 1982.

== Career ==
Following his father into acting, Robbins made his television debut on an episode of Trapper John, M.D. He guest starred on a number of television series and had a recurring role on General Hospital. As an actor, he became known for his role as Eric Mardian on the ABC sitcom Head of the Class. He also hosted the children's version of the game show Pictionary in 1989. In the 1990s, Robbins started producing the show All That and its spin-offs on Nickelodeon. He has produced several sports films including Coach Carter and Hardball (2001). He produced Smallville and also One Tree Hill. He has often collaborated with producer Michael Tollin. Robbins is the founder of AwesomenessTV, a YouTube channel aimed at teenagers. The channel spun off into a television series, on which Robbins served as executive producer. DreamWorks Animation acquired the company in 2013. On February 22, 2017, following NBCUniversal/Comcast's acquisition of DreamWorks Animation, Robbins resigned as AwesomenessTV's CEO, ending his five-year run with the company.

Robbins first joined Paramount in 2017 as the first president of Paramount Players, after which he became president of Nickelodeon in 2018, and then president of Kids & Family Entertainment, for Viacom (later merged with CBS Corporation to form ViacomCBS, now Paramount). On October 1, 2018, shortly after being appointed as president of Nickelodeon, he resigned his position as the president of Paramount Players, ending his 16-month run at the studio. Despite leaving the studio, he remained involved with Paramount Players division Nickelodeon Movies.

Robbins became head of Paramount Pictures in September 2021. He focused on driving Paramount's multi-platform strategy and theatrical success through a diversified portfolio of films. Robbins was also at the forefront of securing strategic filmmaker partnerships to expand the studio's global franchise business across live-action features, animation, consumer products and themed entertainment.

As President and CEO of Paramount Pictures alongside from his dual role at Nick, Brian Robbins oversaw the expansion and revitalization of well-known franchises from Nick and Paramount Pictures such as Transformers, Sonic the Hedgehog, Mission: Impossible, A Quiet Place, Scream, SpongeBob SquarePants, Teenage Mutant Ninja Turtles, and PAW Patrol, with the latter two receiving a combined $2.5 billion in consumer products revenue in 2023 alone. Robbins emphasized allowing intellectual property-driven brands to drive other lines of business, particularly consumer products. Robbins was instrumental in leading a multi-platform franchise strategy including greenlighting both a third Sonic the Hedgehog film and the spin-off series Knuckles. Most recently, Sonic the Hedgehog 3 surpassed the $405 million box office record of the previous film and the film franchise surpassed $1.2 billion in worldwide box office gross across its three movies. Following its debut, Knuckles, in its first 28 days streaming on Paramount+, received over 11 million total global hours and is the most-watched children's and family series on Paramount+ in terms of hours.

Under Robbins' tenure, Paramount Pictures received over $6 billion in worldwide box office gross and had numerous number 1 hits, including Top Gun: Maverick. In 2024, Robbins oversaw the theatrical release of five number 1 openings, including Sonic the Hedgehog 3, Smile 2, Bob Marley: One Love, Mean Girls, and IF.

Robbins has been recognized for his strategic approach to theatrical release windows relative to streaming. As an example of this, he shifted the release strategy of Smile from streaming to theatrical, with Smile becoming the top-grossing original horror film of that year and becoming the studio's third most profitable film in a decade. Robbins also strengthened Paramount Animation and Paramount's consumer products division through the success of Teenage Mutant Ninja Turtles and PAW Patrol. Robbins emphasized allowing intellectual property-driven properties to drive other lines of business, particularly consumer products.

On April 29, 2024, Robbins, along with George Cheeks and Chris McCarthy, became co-CEOs of Paramount Global after Bob Bakish resigned from his role.

Robbins is a board member of the Motion Picture Association; a member of the Academy of Motion Picture Arts and Sciences; sits on the board of trustees for the AFI and is the recipient of a Directors Guild Award, a Peabody Award, and the Pioneer Prize from the International Academy of Television Arts and Sciences.

Following the merger of Skydance Media and Paramount Global, Robbins stepped down from his positions within Paramount and Nickelodeon. In January 2026, it was announced that Robbins was creating a new animation company titled Big Shot Pictures, managing to acquire a first look deal with Sony Pictures.

== Personal life ==
He married publicist Laura Cathcart and they had two sons together before divorcing in 2013. He married stylist Tracy James in 2014. They have a daughter, and live with his sons in the Hancock Park neighborhood of Los Angeles.

== Filmography ==
=== Film ===
Year	Title	Director	Producer	Notes
1995	The Show	Yes	Yes	Documentary film
1997	Good Burger	Yes	Yes	Also executive soundtrack producer
1999	Varsity Blues	Yes	Yes	Also executive soundtrack producer
2000	Ready to Rumble	Yes	No	Also executive soundtrack producer
2001	Hardball	Yes	Yes	Also executive soundtrack producer
2004	The Perfect Score	Yes	Yes	Also executive soundtrack producer
2006	The Shaggy Dog	Yes	No	
2007	Norbit	Yes	Executive	Nominated- Golden Raspberry Award for Worst Director
2008	Meet Dave	Yes	No	
2012	A Thousand Words	Yes	Yes	Filmed in 2008

Producer only

- Summer Catch (2001)
- Big Fat Liar (2002) (Also story writer)
- Radio (2003)
- Coach Carter (2005)
- Wild Hogs (2007)
- The To Do List (2013)
- Before I Fall (2017)
- Bigger Fatter Liar (2017) (executive producer)
- The Loud House Movie (2021) (executive producer)

Acting roles

Year	Title	Role
1988	Cellar Dweller	Phillip Lemley
1989	C.H.U.D. II: Bud the C.H.U.D.	Steve Williams

=== Television ===
Year	Title	Director	Executive Producer	Writer	Notes
1988	Head of the Class	No	No	Yes	Episode: "Will the Real Arvid Engen Please Stand Up?"
1994	All That	No	Yes	Yes	Also creator
1996	Kenan & Kel	Yes	Yes	No	5 episodes
1998–2001	Cousin Skeeter	Yes	Yes	Yes	Also creator; Wrote "A Family Thing", directed "Skeeter's Toy Story"
1999	Popular	Yes	No	No	Episode: "The Phantom Menace"
2001	The Nightmare Room	Yes	Yes	No	Episode: "Four Eyes"
2002	Birds of Prey	Yes	Yes	No	Episode: "Pilot"
2005	All That 10th Anniversary Reunion Special	No	No	Yes	TV special
2010	Blue Mountain State	Yes	Yes	No	2 episodes
2011	Supah Ninjas	Yes	Yes	No	2 episodes

Executive producer only

- The Amanda Show (2000–2001)
- Smallville (2001–2011)
- The Nick Cannon Show (2002)
- What I Like About You (2002–2006)
- One Tree Hill (2003–2012)
- Crumbs (2006)
- Sonny with a Chance (2009–2011)
- Fred: The Movie (2010)
- So Random! (2011–2012)
- AwesomenessTV (2013–2015)

Thanks credits

- Are You Smarter Than a 5th Grader? (2019)
- The Loud House (2019–present)
- SpongeBob SquarePants (2019–present)
- Middle School Moguls (2019)
- Blaze and the Monster Machines (2019–2025)
- Are You Afraid of the Dark? (2019)
- The Casagrandes (2019–2022)
- Blue's Clues & You! (2019–2024)
- It's Pony (2020–2022)
- Glitch Techs (2020)
- Santiago of the Seas (2020–2023)
- Baby Shark's Big Show! (2020–2025)
- Kamp Koral: SpongeBob's Under Years (2021–2024)
- Rugrats (2021–2024)
- The Patrick Star Show (2021–present)
- Middlemost Post (2021–2022)

Acting roles

Year	Title	Role	Notes
1982	Harper Valley PTA	Charlie's Nephew	Episode: "The Return of Charlie's Chow Palace"
1982	Archie Bunker's Place	Danny Ferguson	Episode: "Double Date"
1982	The Facts of Life	Ben	Episode: "For the Asking"
1982	Taxi	Young Man	Episode: "Alex the Gofer"
1983	Teachers Only	Vinnie Minetti	Episodes: "Praise the Lord and Pasta Ammunition" and "Rex, the Wonder Husband"
1983	Three's Company	Mark Furley	Episode: "Janet's Little Helper"
1983	Knight Rider	Randy Merritt	Episode: "Soul Survivor"
1984	Diff'rent Strokes	Skyhigh	Episode: "Undercover Lover"
1984	Newhart	Rob	Episode: "The Fan"
1985	Charles in Charge	Todd Baldwin	Episode: "Mr. President"
1985	Growing Pains	Mitch	Episode: "Dirt Bike"
1986	The Gladiator	Jeff Benton	TV movie
1986	Mr. Belvedere	Eric	Episode: "The Dropout"
1986–1991	Head of the Class	Eric Mardian	114 episodes
1987	Kids Incorporated	Brian	Episode: "Win a Date with Renee"
1990	Camp Cucamonga	Roger Berg	TV movie
1992	Full House	David Janolari	Episodes: "Captain Video: Part 1" and "Captain Video: Part 2"
1997	Kenan & Kel	Risotto	Episode: "Safe and Sorry"

== Awards and nominations ==
Year	Award	Result	Category	Title
1993	Heartland Film Festival	Won	Crystal Heart Award	Hardwood Dreams (shared with Mike Tollin)
1995	Emmy Award	Nominated	Outstanding Informational Special	Hank Aaron: Chasing the Dream (shared with Debra Martin Chase, Fredric Golding, Dorian Harewood, David Houle, Tom McMahon, Pat Mitchell, Jack Myers, Vivian Schiller, Mike Tollin, Denzel Washington)
1996	CableACE Award	Won	Children's Special - 7 and Older	Sports Theater with Shaquille O'Neal (shared with Leonard Armato, Bruce Binkow, Robert Mickelson, Shaquille O'Neal, Mike Tollin, For the special "4 Points")
1997	Directors Guild of America Award	Nominated	Outstanding Directorial Achievement in Children's Programs	Sports Theater with Shaquille O'Neal (for the special "4 Points")
1998	Directors Guild of America Award	Won	Outstanding Directorial Achievement in Children's Programs	Sports Theater with Shaquille O'Neal (shared with W. Alexander Ellis, Cynthia Riddle, Brad Uecker: for episode "First Time")
2005	Black Movie Awards	Nominated	Outstanding Motion Picture	Coach Carter (shared with David Gale, Mike Tollin)
2016	Emmy Award	Nominated	Outstanding Children's Series	Project Mc²: Season 1

Preceded by Cyma Zarghami	Nickelodeon president 2018–2025	Succeeded by Incumbent
