= Sulphur High School =

Sulphur High School can refer to:

- Sulphur High School (Louisiana), in Sulphur, Louisiana
- Sulphur High School (Oklahoma), in Sulphur, Oklahoma
