= Survivor: Millennials vs. Gen X =

- Season 33
- Region 1 DVD cover
- Presented by: Jeff Probst
- No. of days: 39
- No. of castaways: 20
- Winner: Adam Klein
- Runners-up: Hannah Shapiro; Ken McNickle
- Location: Mamanuca Islands, Fiji
- No. of episodes: 14

Release
- Original network: CBS
- Original release: September 21 – December 14, 2016

Additional information
- Filming dates: April 4 – May 12, 2016

Season chronology
- ← Previous; Kaôh Rōng Next → Game Changers — Mamanuca Islands

Survivor: Millennials vs. Gen-X is the 33rd season of the American competitive reality television series Survivor. It was broadcast by CBS between September 21 and December 14, 2016. The season was filmed between April 4 and May 12, 2016 in the Mamanuca Islands of Fiji. Severe Tropical Cyclone Zena struck the filming location during the game, so the entire cast were temporarily evacuated for the first time in the show's history. It originally divided its 20 contestants into two tribes of ten based on their Generation – "Takali" (Generation X) "Vanua" (Millennials). On day 13, the contestants were redivided, introducing a third tribe, "Ikabula". On day 21, the contestants merged into one tribe, "Vinaka". Two gameplay mechanics were introduced to the show in this season: The Legacy Advantage (that provided immunity from being voted out at the day 36 Tribal Council) and the Reward Steal Advantage (allowing a player to take another player's place on a reward).

After 39 days, Adam Klein unanimously won the title of Sole Survivor and the US$1,000,000 prize, receiving 10-0-0 jury votes against fellow finalists Ken McNickle and Hannah Shapiro. Klein became the third Jewish winner, after Ethan Zohn from Survivor: Africa and John Cochran from Survivor: Caramoan. Though the theme was criticized, the season received generally positive reviews for the cast and gameplay.

== Overview ==
Survivor is a reality television show based on the Swedish show Expedition Robinson, created by Mark Burnett and Charlie Parsons. The series follows a number of participants isolated in a remote location, where they must provide food, fire, and shelter. One by one, a participant is removed from the series by majority vote, with challenges held to give a reward (ranging from living- and food-related prizes to a car) and immunity from being voted out of the series. The last remaining player receives a prize of $1,000,000.

== Production ==
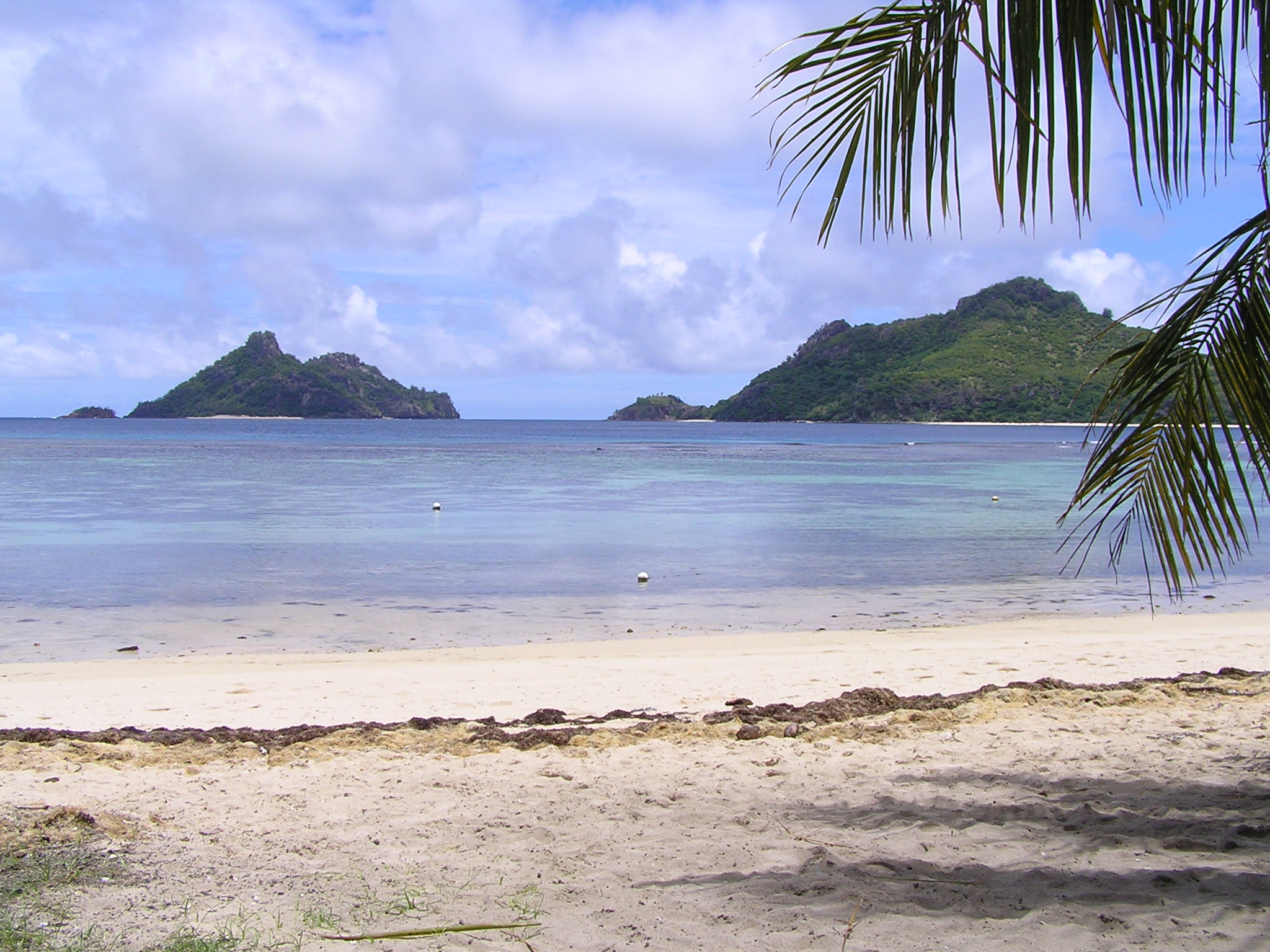
The season filmed in the Mamanuca Islands of Fiji.

Survivor: Millennials vs. Gen-X was filmed between April 4 and May 12, 2016 in the Mamanuca Islands of Fiji. It was the second season of Survivor to film in Fiji, following Survivor: Fiji, season 14, though that season was shot in a different area of the country. Damage left from Cyclone Winston reportedly caused filming delays. The season was originally broadcast by CBS between September 21 and December 14, 2016. On day 2 of the game, Severe Tropical Cyclone Zena struck the filming location, meaning the entire cast had to be evacuated from the game temporarily for the first time in the show's history. The cast were taken to the production's base camp, and the tribes were kept in different rooms to assure the game didn't continue during the evacuation.

The season's theme was revealed at the reunion for Survivor: Kaôh Rōng. It originally divided its 20 contestants into two tribes of ten based on their generation: "Takali" (Generation X) and "Vanua" (Millennials). It was the third season to divide its starting tribes by age, following Survivor: Panama and Survivor: Nicaragua, seasons 12 and 21, respectively.

The season introduced the Legacy Advantage to the game. Its powers were originally left as a mystery until day 36. If its holder is voted out with it, they must will it to another player still in the game. The power was eventually revealed to be immunity at the day 36 Tribal Council. It also introduced the Reward Steal Advantage, allowing a player to take another player's place on a reward.

== Contestants ==
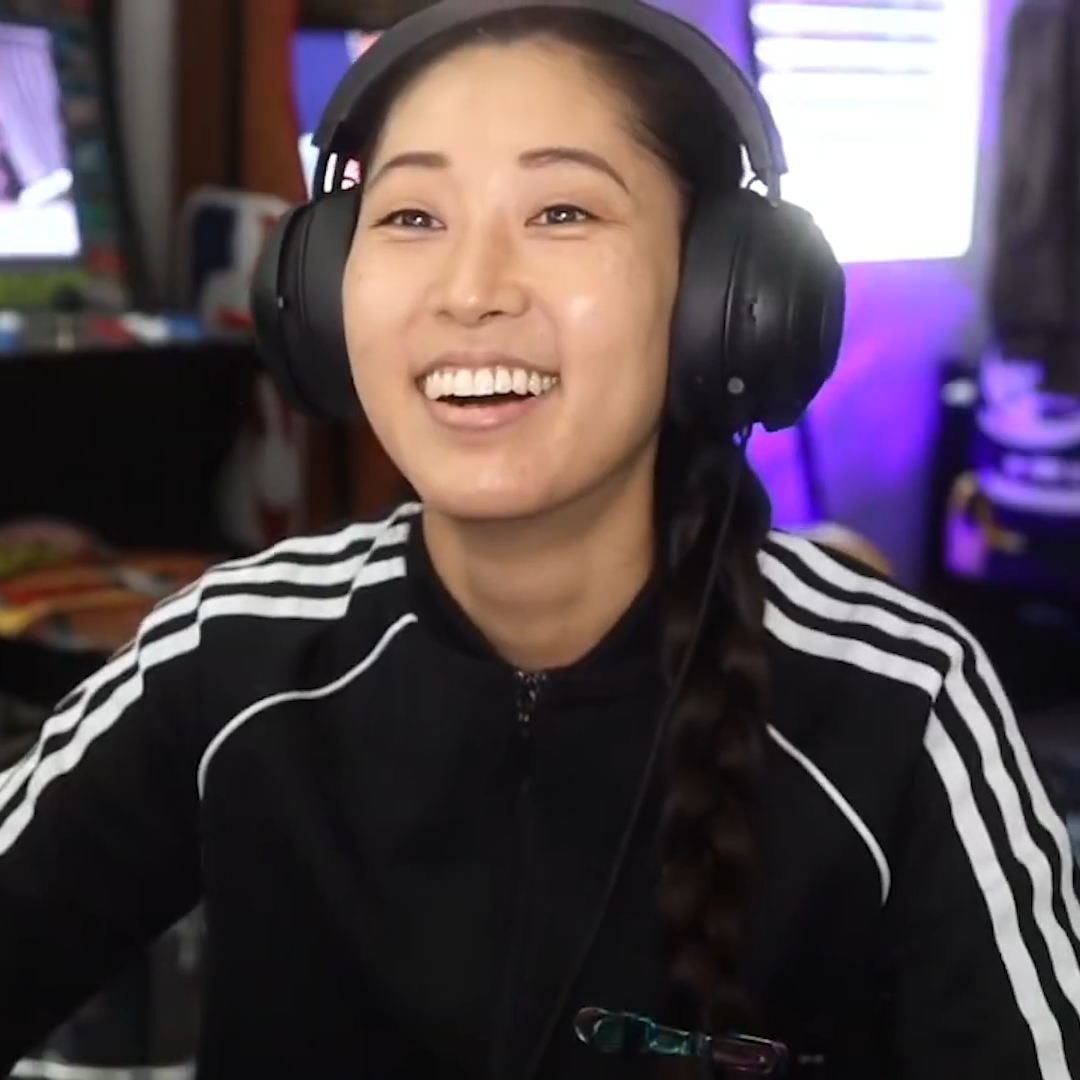
Mari Takahashi

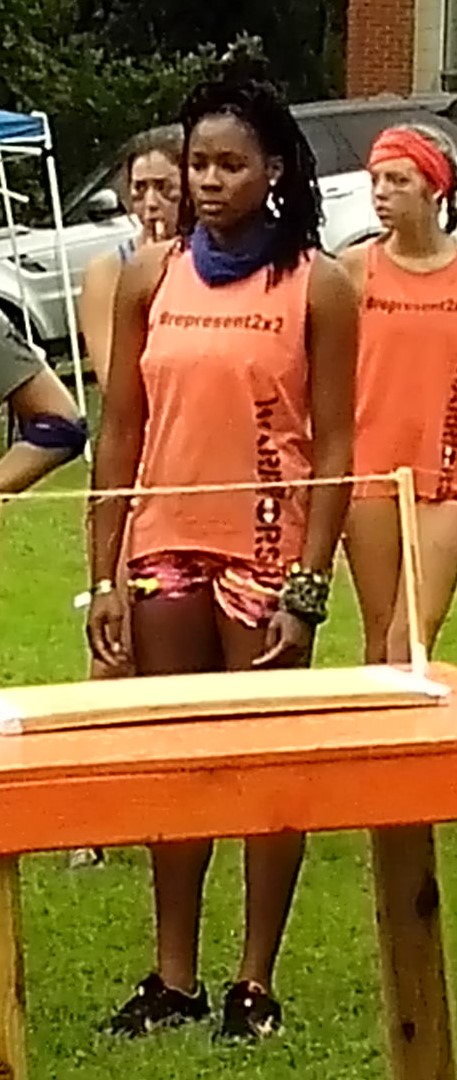
Michaela Bradshaw

The cast is composed of 20 new players, initially split into two tribes containing ten members each: Takali ("Gen-X") and Vanua ("Millennials"). The tribe names come from the Fijian words for "open ocean" and "homeland", respectively. On Day 13, the remaining castaways were redistributed into three tribes, including new tribe Ikabula, named after the Fijian word for "turtle". On Day 21, the remaining castaways were merged into one tribe, which they named Vinaka after the Fijian word for "thank you". Notable castaways this season include David Wright, a writer on the FOX animated sitcom Family Guy, and Smosh Games YouTuber Mari Takahashi.

List of Survivor: Millennials vs. Gen X contestants
Contestant	Age	From	Tribe			Finish	
Contestant	Age	From	Original	Switched	Merged	Placement	Day
Rachel Ako	37	Los Angeles; California	Takali			1st voted out	Day 4
Mari Takahashi	31	Los Angeles, California	Vanua			2nd voted out	Day 7
Paul Wachter	52	Sugarloaf Key, Florida	Takali			3rd voted out	Day 10
Lucy Huang	42	Diamond Bar, California	Takali			4th voted out	Day 12
Ciandre "CeCe" Taylor	39	Granada Hills, California	Takali	Vanua		5th voted out	Day 15
Jessica "Figgy" Figueroa	23	Nashville, Tennessee	Vanua	Takali		6th voted out	Day 18
Michaela Bradshaw	25	Fort Worth, Texas	Vanua	Ikabula		7th voted out	Day 20
Michelle Schubert	28	Yakima, Washington	Vanua	Vanua	Vinaka	8th voted out 1st jury member	Day 23
Taylor Lee Stocker	24	Post Falls, Idaho	Vanua	Takali	Vinaka	9th voted out 2nd jury member	Day 25
Chris Hammons	38	Moore, Oklahoma	Takali	Vanua	Vinaka	10th voted out 3rd jury member	Day 28
Jessica Lewis	37	Voorheesville, New York	Takali	Takali	Vinaka	Eliminated (Note: Due to a deadlocked tie after two rounds of voting and the non-tied contestants being unable to come up with a unanimous decision to vote out either Hannah or Zeke, the non-tied and non-immune contestants — Adam, Bret, David, Jessica, Sunday and Will — drew rocks to resolve the vote; Jessica picked the black rock and was therefore eliminated.); 4th jury member	Day 30
Zeke Smith	28	Brooklyn, New York	Vanua	Vanua	Vinaka	11th voted out 5th jury member	Day 33
Will Wahl	18	Long Valley, New Jersey	Vanua	Ikabula	Vinaka	12th voted out 6th jury member	Day 34
Sunday Burquest	45	Otsego, Minnesota	Takali	Ikabula	Vinaka	13th voted out 7th jury member	Day 35
Justin "Jay" Starrett	27	Fort Lauderdale, Florida	Vanua	Ikabula	Vinaka	14th voted out 8th jury member	Day 36
Bret LaBelle	42	Dedham, Massachusetts	Takali	Ikabula	Vinaka	15th voted out 9th jury member	Day 37
David Wright	42	Sherman Oaks, California	Takali	Vanua	Vinaka	16th voted out 10th jury member	Day 38
Hannah Shapiro	24	West Hollywood, California	Vanua	Ikabula	Vinaka	Co-runners-up	Day 39
Ken McNickle	33	Denver, Colorado	Takali	Takali	Vinaka	Co-runners-up	Day 39
Adam Klein	25	San Francisco, California	Vanua	Takali	Vinaka	Sole Survivor	Day 39

=== Future appearances ===
Michaela Bradshaw and Zeke Smith returned the following season for Survivor: Game Changers. David Wright returned for Survivor: Edge of Extinction. Adam Klein returned to compete on Survivor: Winners at War.

Outside of Survivor, Bret LaBelle and Chris Hammons competed as a team in The Amazing Race 31. Michelle Schubert competed on the eleventh season of American Ninja Warrior. Jay Starrett appeared on the second season of the MTV reality series Ex on the Beach, in addition to the thirty-fifth, thirty-sixth, thirty-eighth, and thirty-ninth seasons of the MTV reality competition series The Challenge. Bradshaw competed on the thirty-seventh season of The Challenge, and the second season of The Challenge: USA. Figgy Figueroa competed on Squid Game: The Challenge as Player 033.

== Season summary ==
The 20 new castaways were initially divided into tribes based on generation. The Gen-X tribe was fractured between two alliances—one led by Paul and Chris, and the other by David and Ken—while the Millennial tribe's majority was run by Jay and Michelle. With 16 players remaining, the castaways were divided into three tribes, during which Millennial outsiders Adam and Zeke worked with the Gen-X-ers against the majority Millennial alliance.

The four initial alliances regrouped at the merge: the core Millennial alliance; the Millennial outsider alliance of Adam, Hannah and Zeke; Chris's alliance; and David and Ken's alliance. While the latter three alliances initially formed a majority coalition, it eventually splintered as David and Zeke targeted each other. Zeke rallied together the remnants of Chris's alliance and the core Millennial alliance, while Adam and Hannah joined David's alliance; David's alliance ultimately won out, and Adam, David, Hannah and Ken were able to eliminate all others, though Adam's attempts to betray David for being the largest strategic threat remaining were thwarted by Hannah and Ken's unwavering loyalty.

With only the four remaining, Hannah and Ken decided to join Adam to eliminate David. At the final Tribal Council, the jury lambasted Ken and Hannah for following David too long, while Adam was applauded for being loyal but also willing to eliminate threats, which led the jury to unanimously vote Adam as Sole Survivor.

Challenge winners and eliminations by episodes
Episode			Challenge winner(s)		Eliminated	
No.	Title	Original air date	Reward	Immunity	Tribe	Player
1	"May the Best Generation Win"	September 21, 2016	Vanua		Takali	Rachel
2	"Love Goggles"	September 28, 2016	Takali		Vanua	Mari
3	"Your Job is Recon"	October 5, 2016	Vanua		Takali	Paul
4	"Who's the Sucker at the Table?"	October 12, 2016	Takali	Vanua	Takali	Lucy
5	"Idol Search Party"	October 19, 2016	None (Note: There was no reward challenge due to the tribe switch.)	Ikabula	Vanua	CeCe
5	"Idol Search Party"	October 19, 2016	None	Takali	Vanua	CeCe
6	"The Truth Works Well"	October 26, 2016	Vanua	Ikabula	Takali	Figgy
6	"The Truth Works Well"	October 26, 2016	Ikabula	Vanua	Takali	Figgy
7	"I Will Destroy You"	November 2, 2016	Vanua	Takali	Ikabula	Michaela
7	"I Will Destroy You"	November 2, 2016	Ikabula	Vanua	Ikabula	Michaela
8	"I'm the Kingpin"	November 9, 2016	None (Note: There was no reward challenge due to the merge.)	Will	Vinaka	Michelle
9	"Still Throwin' Punches"	November 16, 2016	Bret, Chris, David, Ken, Sunday, Taylor	Ken	Vinaka	Taylor
10	"Million Dollar Gamble"	November 23, 2016	Adam, Bret, Hannah, Sunday, Zeke	David	Vinaka	Chris
10	"Million Dollar Gamble"	November 23, 2016	Bret, Sunday, Zeke, [David] (Note: David did not participate in the challenge and automatically joined the winning team on the reward as a result of picking the odd rock.)	Jay	Vinaka	Jessica
11	"About to Have a Rumble"	November 30, 2016	Jay [Adam, Sunday, Will]	Adam	Vinaka	Zeke
12	"Slayed the Survivor Dragon"	December 7, 2016	None	Jay	Vinaka	Will
12	"Slayed the Survivor Dragon"	December 7, 2016	None	Ken	Vinaka	Sunday
13	"I'm Going for a Million Bucks"	December 14, 2016	~~David~~ (Jay) (Note: Jay stole the reward from David. Jay was able to choose the reward participants, although David retained immunity; Jay picked David and Adam to join him on the reward.) [Adam, David]	David	Vinaka	Jay
13	"I'm Going for a Million Bucks"	December 14, 2016	None	Ken	Vinaka	Bret
13	"I'm Going for a Million Bucks"	December 14, 2016	None	Ken	Vinaka	David
14	"Reunion"	December 14, 2016				

== Episodes ==
No. overall	No. in season	Title	CBS recap	Rating/share (18-49)	Original release date	U.S. viewers (millions)	Weekly rank
486	1	"May the Best Generation Win"	Recap	2.3/8	September 21, 2016	9.46	14
The 20 new players were divided into two tribes of 10 based on age: those 33 and older formed the Gen X tribe, while those 31 and younger formed the Millennials tribe. Immediately, the tribes were given a few minutes to grab supplies scattered in the jungle. During the scramble, Jessica from the Gen X tribe found an envelope. At camp, she learned that she had found a "legacy advantage," which would give her an unspecified advantage in the game on Day 36; if she were voted out before then, she would privately will it to someone else following her elimination. Both tribes had difficulties setting up their camps due to a severe storm, even after being given tarps for assistance and shelter. After the storm was upgraded to a cyclone, both tribes were evacuated to a safe location for the night, and returned to their camps the following morning. At the Millennials camp, Zeke led the tribe in building the shelter and making fire. Taylor flirted with Figgy and bonded with Jay; the three aligned, and later added Michelle to their alliance. However, Hannah and Mari were wary of Taylor's alliance and Mari began rallying her other tribemates against them. At the Gen X camp, Rachel's bossiness annoyed her tribemates while David struggled with camp setup; his paranoia led to him searching for a hidden immunity idol, which caused his tribe to distrust him.: Reward/immunity Challenge: The castaways completed an obstacle course; at two points in the challenge, each tribe could opt to take a "shortcut" to make a portion easier. After completing the obstacle course, two tribemates solved a puzzle; the difficulty of the puzzle increased with each additional shortcut taken. The first tribe to complete their puzzle won immunity and fire in the form of flint.; The Gen X tribe took both shortcuts while the Millennials took one; while the Gen X tribe completed the obstacle course first, they lost their lead after David and Rachel struggled on the puzzle, and the Millennials won immunity. Back at camp, an alliance of Bret, Chris, Jessica, Lucy, Paul, and Sunday formed, and—following an impassioned plea of loyalty from David—they decided to target Rachel. At Tribal Council, David, Ken and the majority alliance of six split their votes between Rachel and her only ally, CeCe, in case of a hidden immunity idol; no idols were played, and Rachel became the first castaway voted out.
487	2	"Love Goggles"	Recap	2.1/8	September 28, 2016	9.16	16
At the Gen X camp, David managed to make fire, but both Chris and Paul targeted him for elimination; however, David was able to find the tribe's hidden immunity idol. David later showed Ken the idol, and the two aligned with CeCe against Paul. Paul fell ill from heat exhaustion but, following a visit from the medical team, was cleared to remain in the game. At the Millennials camp, Taylor and Figgy's mutual attraction continued, but Michaela overheard the two kissing and outed them the next morning; this alarmed Jay, Figgy and Taylor's closest ally. Michaela and Figgy proceeded to argue.: Reward/immunity challenge: One at a time, five tribe members swam out to a platform in the water; as they jumped off, they grabbed a key. After all five keys were gathered, the other four competing tribemates used the keys to unlock a diving mask, and then took turns diving down and unlocking five rings in the water. Then, two of the divers threw the rings onto a series of targets; the first tribe to get a ring on all five of their targets won immunity and a tarp.; The Gen X tribe won immunity. Back at camp, Zeke worked to break up Figgy and Taylor, telling his other tribemates to vote out Figgy. Jay alerted Michelle, and they decided to target Mari for her intelligence: Michelle recruited Will, and Figgy and Michaela made amends. During Tribal Council, Jay and Michelle quietly tried convincing Hannah to change her vote to Mari; after much noticeable hesitation, Hannah joined the new majority and cast her vote against Mari, who became the second person voted out, leaving Adam and Zeke in shock.
488	3	"Your Job is Recon"	Recap	1.9/7	October 5, 2016	8.60	15
After switching her vote to eliminate Mari, Hannah apologized to Adam and Zeke and expressed a desire to still work with them, but they were frustrated with her for refusing to leave them alone after betraying them. The next day, both tribes were instructed to send four representatives, chosen by random draw, to a summit: Figgy, Jay, Taylor and Will went for the Millennials, while CeCe, Chris, David and Paul went for the Gen X tribe. After the eight feasted, CeCe and David privately chatted with Figgy and Taylor, telling them that Paul was their tribe's leader; David later pledged loyalty to Taylor if they ever ended up on a tribe together, and vowed to turn against his Gen X tribemates. After returning to camp, Figgy and her allies decided to target Zeke while Adam tried convincing Michaela to rejoin her initial alliance and split up Figgy and Taylor, which she considered. At the Gen X camp, the minority alliance of CeCe, David, and Ken continued to campaign against Paul.: Reward/immunity challenge: Five tribemates carried 40-pound bags filled with coconuts and sandbags through an obstacle course, and then transported them across a balance beam. Then, two tribemates separated the sandbags from the coconuts and threw the sandbags at a series of puzzle blocks on a table. After clearing their table, the last two tribemates then reassembled the puzzle. The first tribe to do so won immunity, blankets, pillows, a hammock and two lounge chairs.; After CeCe struggled on the balance beam, the Millennials gained a lead that they were able to maintain to win the challenge. Back at camp, the majority alliance targeted CeCe; however, after Paul made an offhand comment to Jessica about how he would align with men over women, the women in his alliance—Jessica, Lucy, and Sunday—considered voting him out. At Tribal Council, they joined the minority alliance to eliminate Paul from the game.
489	4	"Who's the Sucker at the Table?"	Recap	2.0/8	October 12, 2016	9.06	18
The morning after Tribal Council, Lucy told Chris and Bret that betraying Paul was Jessica's idea, and Chris, Bret, Lucy and Sunday targeted Jessica for being untrustworthy. While his Millennials tribemates hunted for food, Adam looked for the hidden immunity idol and found a clue to its location.: Reward challenge: Two members per tribe raced to retrieve a ring in the water; a tribe scored a point when one of their members had one hand on the ring and one hand on their tribe's starting pole. The first tribe to score three points won steaks, sausages, spices, and vegetables.; The Gen X tribe won the challenge in the fifth round. At the Millennials camp, Adam found the hidden immunity idol. At the Gen X camp, Lucy told David and Ken that Jessica was the next target, but demanded that they not talk to anyone else about the plan; Ken did not appreciate Lucy's bossiness and considered making a move against her.: Immunity challenge: Three tribemates, one at a time, raced through a series of obstacles to a chair, where five other tribemates used a pulley system to lift them across a vertical structure to retrieve ten puzzle pieces. Once all thirty pieces were retrieved, the three retrievers used them to solve a word puzzle. The first tribe to do so won immunity.; After 45 minutes on the puzzle, the Millennials won the challenge. Back at the Gen X camp, CeCe, David, and Ken tried to rally support against Lucy, but Ken was unable to convince Jessica that Lucy was targeting her. Jessica discussed Ken's claims with Lucy and was further dissuaded after Lucy told her to vote against CeCe. Ken and Lucy later argued: Ken about Lucy's attitude and Lucy about Ken's attempts to vote her out. David considered playing his idol on Jessica to secure her as an ally, which would put his alliance with CeCe and Ken in the majority. After an argumentative Tribal Council, Ken joined Bret, Chris, Lucy and Sunday in voting against Jessica while Jessica voted against CeCe. However, David played his hidden immunity idol on Jessica, nullifying the five votes against her and sending Lucy out of the game with David and CeCe's votes.
490	5	"Idol Search Party"	Recap	1.9/7	October 19, 2016	8.59	17
After David played his hidden immunity idol to save Jessica, she vowed to be loyal to David and Ken and told Ken about her legacy advantage. The next morning, the Gen X tribe looked for the rehidden immunity idol, which David found. Later that day, the castaways were redistributed into three tribes: CeCe, Chris, David, Michelle and Zeke formed the Vanua tribe, at the Millennials camp; Adam, Figgy, Jessica, Ken and Taylor formed the Takali tribe, at the Gen X camp; and Bret, Hannah, Jay, Michaela, Sunday and Will formed the Ikabula tribe, receiving an extra member due to having to build a camp from scratch. At Takali, Figgy implored Taylor to hide their romance from their new tribemates, while Adam and Ken bonded. At Vanua, Chris and Zeke bonded over their mutual home state of Oklahoma, and Chris's experience playing on the 2000 Oklahoma Sooners football team. At Ikabula, Gen X-ers Bret and Sunday struggled to integrate with the Millennial majority, and Michaela made fire for the tribe.: Immunity challenge: The castaways dove underwater to retrieve buoys. Once all five buoys were retrieved, the tribe then threw the buoys into a basket on a floating platform; they also had the option to throw a hook onto the platform to drag it closer. The first two tribes to land all five buoys in their basket won immunity.; After CeCe and David struggled to secure their buoys, Vanua lost the challenge. Back at camp, the Gen X majority of CeCe, Chris and David chose to target Michelle over Zeke, but Chris decided to join the Millennials to target CeCe instead for her poor challenge performances. Chris told David about the plan in an attempt to engender trust, which David agreed to. However, after a paranoid Michelle tried to convince CeCe to target David, David realized that he would be the weakest member of the tribe once CeCe was gone and considered using his new idol to save CeCe, but at Tribal Council, David kept with Chris' plan and CeCe was voted out.
491	6	"The Truth Works Well"	Recap	1.9/7	October 26, 2016	8.30	23
At Ikabula, Jay and Will found the hidden immunity idol, but were caught by Michaela. As the tribes assembled for the reward challenge, Figgy expressed joy upon discovering that her ally Michelle had not been voted out.: Reward challenge: Three tribemates were blindfolded while a fourth directed them through a course to retrieve a series of puzzle pieces. Once all the pieces were retrieved, one of their blindfolded tribemates—as directed by their caller—completed the puzzle. The first tribe to finish their puzzle won pie, cookies, brownies, milk and iced tea, while the second tribe won a plate of cookies.; Vanua placed first while Ikabula placed second. Hannah suffers a panic attack while sitting out but is cleared to continue. Back at Vanua, Zeke considered targeting Michelle due to Figgy's comments before the challenge. At Takali, Figgy and Taylor decided to tell Jessica and Ken about their relationship.: Immunity challenge: Two tribemates raced through a series of balance beams to retrieve three bags of coconuts each. A third tribemate then opened the bags to retrieve three billiard balls, and then joined another tribemate to navigate the three balls through a labyrinth. The first two tribes to land all three balls at the end of the table won immunity.; Michaela's leadership led Ikabula to victory; she then coached Zeke and Michelle, which allowed them to win the challenge for Vanua. Back at Takali, Adam found himself caught between staying loyal to the Millennials by voting with Figgy and Taylor against Ken, or breaking up the relationship by voting with Jessica and Ken against Figgy. Ultimately, at Tribal Council, Adam cast the deciding vote against Figgy, sending her out of the game.
492	7	"I Will Destroy You"	Recap	1.6/5	November 2, 2016	6.93	22
After Tribal Council, Adam talked to Taylor about betraying him and eliminating Figgy, but Taylor still plotted revenge. At Vanua, David told Zeke that he trusts him more than Chris and showed him his hidden immunity idol in order to secure his loyalty.: Reward challenge: The tribes maneuvered three balls through a series of obstacles, and then threw them on top of a wooden structure. The first tribe to get all three balls on top of their structure won a steak lunch cooked by a professional chef, while the second tribe to finish won a plate of kabobs.; Vanua placed first and Ikabula placed second. At Takali, Jessica and Ken considered betraying Adam for the less-strategic Taylor. At Ikabula, Bret continued to lie about his occupation—claiming he was a funeral director instead of a police officer—but Hannah and Jay were suspicious, correctly deducing that he was a cop.: Immunity challenge: The castaways threw coconuts into a basket; once enough coconuts were in the basket, a scale would tip releasing three two-digit numbers; one tribemate would then use the numbers to solve a combination lock and unlock a slingshot. The castaways would then use the slingshot to launch sandbags at targets; the first two tribes to hit all five of their targets won immunity.; Takali and Vanua won the challenge, sending Ikabula to their first Tribal Council. Michaela rallied the Millennials together to split the votes between Bret and Sunday, with Bret leaving on the revote. However, Michaela's long-term plans alarmed Jay and Will, who worried about her impressive strategic mind and challenge performances, and considered voting her out to eliminate a major threat to win. At Tribal Council, Jay and Will teamed up with Bret and Sunday to blindside Michaela from the game.
493	8	"I'm the Kingpin"	Recap	1.9/7	November 9, 2016	8.81	14
After being left out of the plan to eliminate Michaela, Hannah felt on the outs of the Ikabula tribe. The next morning, the three tribes merged into one, Vinaka, and enjoyed a celebratory feast. Jay, Michelle and Taylor reformed the core Millennial alliance along with Will, Jay's closest ally from Ikabula; David reunited with Ken and Jessica, as did Chris with Bret and Sunday, while Millennial outsiders Adam, Hannah and Zeke teamed up. While the tribe feasted, Adam found an advantage: the ability to steal a reward from another player following a reward challenge. Later that night, Taylor stashed food from the feast, but was overheard by several others; as Taylor snacked, Adam came over in an attempt to align, telling Taylor about his advantage and targeting Will, telling Taylor that Will was Jay's new closest ally. However, out of revenge for Adam voting out Figgy, Taylor told Jay about Adam's plan. Jay then told Will, and the two decided to target Adam; however, they were overheard by Zeke.: Immunity challenge: The castaways balanced on a narrow perch with their hands above their heads, shackled to a bar attached to a bucket of water. If the bar was pulled downward, the bucket would drop and the castaway would be eliminated from the challenge; the last player remaining won immunity.; After an hour-and-a-half, Will outlasted Jessica to win immunity, foiling Adam's plan. Chris, David and Zeke—allies from the Vanua tribe—brought their factions together against the core Millennial alliance; while Zeke wanted to target Taylor, David and Chris suggested voting against Michelle as the least-likely to have a hidden immunity idol. Shortly before Tribal Council, a paranoid Adam again talked to Taylor about aligning, which alarmed Adam's allies. However, at Tribal Council, the Millennial outsider-Gen X coalition kept to their plan, and Michelle became the first member of the jury.
494	9	"Still Throwin' Punches"	Recap	1.8/6	November 16, 2016	8.49	17
After Tribal Council, the minority alliance of Jay, Taylor and Will tried to recruit more allies; despite being in opposing alliances, Adam and Taylor promised to protect each others' secrets—Adam about Taylor's food stash and Taylor about Adam's reward-stealing advantage—and Jay reconciled with Hannah.: Reward challenge: Divided into two teams of six, four teammates raced through an obstacle course to retrieve a key to unlock a box; they then dragged the box through the rest of the course. At the end, one teammate used a machete to open the box to release five bolas, which the two other teammates then threw onto a target; the first team to get all five bolas on their target won a cheeseburger lunch at a poolside resort.; Bret, Chris, David, Ken, Sunday and Taylor won the challenge. On the trip, Sunday reflected on her lack of trust in David, Jessica and Ken. At camp, Jay tried talking to Adam, but Adam taunted Jay about Jay being in the minority alliance; after Jay told Adam's allies about his comments, they considered betraying him. The next day, Sunday and Bret discussed targeting Jessica; Sunday recruited Jay, who promised support from his alliance members Taylor and Will.: Immunity challenge: The castaways balanced a ball on a wooden bow while standing on a slanted, increasingly narrow beam, moving farther down as the challenge progressed; if they or the ball fell, they were eliminated. The last castaway remaining won immunity.; Ken defeated Taylor to win immunity. Back at camp, the majority alliance decided to split their votes between Jay and Taylor in case of a hidden immunity idol. Sunday realized that her plan to target Jessica was infeasible at that point, and warned Jay. Taylor then told Jay about his stolen food stash and Adam's advantage. Jay encouraged Taylor to tell their tribemates about Adam's advantage in order to spark distrust. At Tribal Council, Taylor falsely claimed that Adam had eaten the food with him, and also revealed Adam's advantage, which Adam confirmed. Ultimately, the majority alliance stayed loyal while the minority alliance turned on each other out of fear; Jay chose not to play his idol and Taylor was voted out.
495	10	"Million Dollar Gamble"	Recap, part 1 Recap, part 2	1.5/5	November 23, 2016	7.74	16
After Taylor's elimination, Jay returned Taylor's hidden food stash to the tribe, while Will tried building trust with Zeke by telling him about Jay's idol, which Zeke then told his alliance about. Chris, Bret and Sunday decided to turn against David, Jessica and Ken, and targeted Jessica.: Reward challenge: Divided into two teams of five, the teams stood on a raft and used a rope to pull themselves to an obstacle course, where each teammate retrieved one key. Once on shore, they used the keys to unlock four large cubes with colored sides; the castaways were to stack the cubes such that there would be no repeating colors on each side. The first team to do so won a pizza lunch.; Adam, Bret, Hannah, Sunday and Zeke won the challenge. On the reward trip, Bret and Zeke bonded; at camp, David rallied Ken and Jessica against Chris.: Immunity challenge: The castaways used a pole to balance a statue on a ledge while standing on an increasingly narrow beam, moving farther down as the challenge progressed. If they or the statue fell, they were eliminated, and the last castaway remaining won immunity.; David defeated Zeke to win immunity. Back at camp, both alliances tried courting Hannah and Zeke, though neither told Jay about their plans in order to goad him into playing his hidden immunity idol. At Tribal Council, Jay chose not to play his idol; he voted against Jessica, but the other Millennials sided with David's alliance to send Chris to the jury. After Tribal Council, Bret—having lost his closest ally in Chris—tried aligning with Zeke, who suggested they eliminate David for being a strategic threat. The next morning, David tried aligning with Bret against Zeke, but Bret told Zeke about David's plan and Zeke told Bret about David's idol; Zeke then tried recruiting Adam and Hannah but both were hesitant.: Reward challenge: Divided into three teams of three, the castaways relay raced through an obstacle course with their hands and feet shackled together; once all three teammates completed their portions of the course, they were unshackled and completed a snake-shaped puzzle. The first team to solve their puzzle won a helicopter tour of Fiji followed by a picnic.; Before the challenge, the castaways drew rocks to determine teams; the castaway who drew the white rock earned exemption from the challenge and automatically went on the reward trip with the winners. David drew the white rock, and Bret, Sunday and Zeke won the challenge. On the reward trip, Bret came out to Zeke, and the two and Sunday affirmed their alliance against David. Hannah later told David about Zeke's plan, and the two decided to target Zeke.: Immunity challenge: The castaways stood behind a cage door and blindly maneuvered the handle through a maze on the other side; after unlocking their door, they completed a slide puzzle. The first castaway to finish their slide puzzle won immunity.; Jay won the challenge before anyone else was able to unlock their gate. Back at camp, Jessica and Ken confirmed their allegiance with David, while Zeke talked to Hannah about his plan; after she was visibly reluctant to work against David, Zeke decided to target her instead. He recruited Jay and Will to join him, Bret and Sunday, while Hannah tried recruiting Adam to join her, David, Jessica and Ken, and force a tie. At Tribal Council, David and Zeke's alliances openly quarrelled and whispered amongst themselves about their respective plans. Before the votes were read, David stood up to play his hidden immunity idol, but decided to play it for Ken after Adam claimed that he overheard Zeke's alliance planning to vote for him. Adam joined David's alliance in voting against Zeke, but Zeke's alliance voted against Hannah, and the vote was tied. During the revote, Zeke openly asked Jessica to switch sides to avoid a deadlocked tie, but everyone stayed loyal and the votes were tied again. Per the rules, the non-tied castaways were given a few minutes to come to a unanimous decision as to whom to eliminate between Hannah and Zeke, but they were unable to do so. As a result, the non-tied and non-immune castaways drew rocks; the castaway who drew the black rock was eliminated. Jessica drew the black rock and was sent to the jury; after her elimination, she privately chose to give her legacy advantage to Ken.
496	11	"About to Have a Rumble"	Recap	1.9/7	November 30, 2016	8.86	16
After a heated Tribal Council, Zeke's now-majority alliance with Bret, Jay, Sunday and Will solidified a deal to pick off David's alliance one by one. The next morning, Ken found the legacy advantage that Jessica had left for him. Before the reward challenge, the castaways were joined by their loved ones: Sunday's husband, Jeff; Bret's father, Don; Jay's sister, Melanie; Hannah's mother, Liz; Adam's brother, Evan; David's father, Doug; Ken's brother, William; Zeke's father, Sam; and Will's mother, Irene. Adam told his tribemates that he would not use his reward stealing advantage to deprive the challenge winner of time with their loved one.: Reward challenge: The castaways were attached to a rope threaded through a series of obstacles; the first castaway to finish the course won a private barbeque lunch back at camp with their loved one.; Jay won the challenge and chose to share his reward with Will, Sunday, Adam and their loved ones. Adam's brother shared information about their mother's battle with cancer. To show his gratitude to Jay for sharing the reward with him, Adam gave Jay the reward stealer. The next day, Will told David that he was willing to change allegiances and eliminate Zeke for being a strategic threat.: Immunity challenge: The castaways used two metal handles to hold a metal bar in tension above a tile; the last castaway holding their bar won immunity.; Adam defeated Jay to win the challenge. Back at camp, David's alliance, with the addition of Will, targeted Zeke. Zeke, suspicious of David's calm demeanor, decided to target Ken out of fear that David had found another hidden immunity idol. Will told Ken that Zeke's alliance was voting against him, and a paranoid Ken outed Will's duplicity, putting both alliance's plans in disarray. At Tribal Council, both alliances openly vied for Will's vote. Zeke's alliance voted against Hannah, but Will decided to betray them; Adam played his hidden immunity idol on Hannah, negating the four votes against her, while Zeke was sent to the jury.
497	12	"Slayed the Survivor Dragon"	Recap	1.7/6	December 7, 2016	8.50	16
After Zeke's elimination, Will was determined to keep changing allegiances to eliminate threats and prove he deserved to win the game. The next morning, Bret and Sunday approached Adam about aligning to eliminate David, Jay and Will.: Immunity challenge: The castaways transported ten discs across an obstacle course and then rolled them down a ramp into a slot. The first castaway to get all ten discs in their slot won immunity.; Jay won the challenge. Back at camp, Jay and Will tried rallying people against David, but Adam targeted Will for his strategic unpredictability; at Tribal Council, Bret and Sunday joined Adam, David, Hannah and Ken to eliminate Will from the game. With the last of his allies gone, Jay tried aligning with Adam; they discussed targeting David, but Adam was still hoping to eliminate Jay.: Immunity challenge: The castaways dropped a ball down a bean machine and worked on a puzzle as it rolled down; if they failed to grab the ball as it exited the board, they had to take a time penalty before launching the ball again. The first castaway to solve their puzzle won immunity.; Ken won the challenge after Adam gave him advice on the puzzle to prevent David and Jay from winning. Jay targeted David while David's alliance decided to target Sunday to hinder her alliance members from bringing her to the end of the game as a perceived easy opponent in the jury vote. However, Adam plotted to split the votes between David and Jay to eliminate both Jay's idol and a major threat to win; he told Jay to play his idol, and confided in him about his mother's cancer battle. Before Tribal Council, Hannah tried to convince Adam to vote against Sunday in order to keep their alliance strong. At Tribal Council, Jay played his hidden immunity idol but only received one vote, while Adam and Hannah stayed loyal to David and Ken and sent Sunday to the jury.
498	13	"I'm Going for a Million Bucks"	Recap	1.9/7	December 14, 2016	9.09	13
In the middle of the night, David crafted a fake hidden immunity idol, and hid it in a marked coconut; the next morning, Jay spotted and retrieved it, believing it to be real. Ken discovered that the legacy advantage was immunity for that night's Tribal Council, to be played after the votes were cast but before they were read, similar to a hidden immunity idol.: Reward/immunity challenge: The castaways raced through an obstacle course while collecting a bag of puzzle pieces. Using the numbers on the pieces, they solved a combination lock to release a key that would unlock a second set of puzzle pieces to complete a hanging bat puzzle at the end. The first castaway to solve their puzzle won immunity and a steak lunch for them and two other castaways.; David won the challenge, but Jay used the reward stealer to choose the reward participants; he picked David for winning the challenge and Adam for giving him the reward stealer. During the meal, Jay campaigned against Bret for his connections on the jury, and David considered keeping Jay in the game to deflect attention from himself as a threat to win. At Tribal Council, Jay played the fake idol while Ken played the legacy advantage on himself. Jeff tossed the fake idol into the fire pit after declaring that it was not a hidden immunity idol, though he called it "a work of art but has no value in this game". Jay's vote against Ken was negated, while everyone else came together to send Jay out of the game.: Immunity challenge: The castaways moved a buoy along a rope through obstacles in the water. Upon reaching shore, they transported puzzle pieces across a teeter-totter and then used the pieces to solve a word puzzle; first to do so won immunity.; Ken won the challenge. Adam and Bret decided to target David; Adam then searched for a hidden immunity idol, which he found. David, Hannah and Ken affirmed their final three deal and decided to target Adam for being a larger threat than Bret to win the final challenge. Adam then told Hannah about his new idol and plan to eliminate David, but Hannah told David and Ken. At Tribal Council, Adam played the idol on himself, but Hannah, David and Ken voted against Bret to send him to the jury. Back at camp, a frustrated Adam told Hannah that, if David made it to the final tribal council, he would win the game; though she had repeatedly spared David, she agreed with Adam and promised to vote against David the next night.: Immunity challenge: The castaways used a long pole to maneuver a series of wooden bowls around a metal rod structure; they would then balance the bowls on the top of the structure. The spring-mounted structure would sway from the wind or if bumped, which could topple the stack of bowls. The player with the most bowls after thirty minutes or the first to stack thirteen bowls on top won immunity.; After 30 minutes, Hannah and Ken were tied with 10 bowls each; they then competed in a five-minute runoff, which Ken won. With David vulnerable at that night's vote, Adam and Hannah tried convincing Ken—David's closest ally since the start of the game—to betray David. Though Ken was hesitant, he ultimately joined Adam and Hannah in voting David out at Tribal Council, making David the final member of the jury. The next night, the ten jurors questioned Adam, Hannah and Ken about why they deserved to win. All three were lambasted—Ken for not turning on David until it was too late; Adam for being on the wrong side of several votes; and Hannah for foiling earlier plans to eliminate David despite his status as a threat to win—while Adam was praised for making decisive strategic decisions, though both Hannah and Ken defended their roles in making those decisions. In his final answer of the night, Adam emotionally revealed his mom's cancer diagnosis and how it motivated him to play.
499	14	"Reunion"	N/A	1.3/5	December 14, 2016	6.40	13
Months later, it was revealed that the jury unanimously voted to award Adam the title of Sole Survivor over Hannah and Ken. During the reunion, Adam revealed that his mother died an hour after he returned home from the game, and pledged to donate $100,000 of his winnings to cancer research. Several contestants spoke of their personal transformations during the game.

== Voting history ==
	Original tribes				Switched tribes			Merged tribe											
Episode	1	2	3	4	5	6	7	8	9	10				11	12		13		
Day	4	7	10	12	15	18	20	23	25	28	30			33	34	35	36	37	38
Tribe	Takali	Vanua	Takali	Takali	Vanua	Takali	Ikabula	Vinaka	Vinaka	Vinaka	Vinaka			Vinaka	Vinaka	Vinaka	Vinaka	Vinaka	Vinaka
Eliminated	Rachel	Mari	Paul	Lucy	CeCe	Figgy	Michaela	Michelle	Taylor	Chris	Tie (Note: The first Tribal Council Vote resulted in a tie. Per the rules, a second vote was held where the castaways involved in the tie would not vote and the remaining castaways could only vote for those who tied.)	Tie (Note: After two rounds of voting, Tribal Council remained tied. Per the rules, the non-tied castaways must come to a consensus as to whom to eliminate between the tied castaways, or else one of the non-immune deliberating castaways would be eliminated by random draw.)	Jessica	Zeke	Will	Sunday	Jay	Bret	David
Votes	5–3–1–1	7–3	6–3	2–1–0 (Note: David played a hidden immunity idol on Jessica; therefore, five votes against her were not counted.)	4–1	3–2	4–2	9–4	7–4–1	7–4	5–5	4–4	Rock Draw (Note: Due to a deadlocked tie after two rounds of voting and the non-tied contestants being unable to come up with a unanimous decision to vote out either Hannah or Zeke, the non-tied and non-immune contestants—Adam, Bret, David, Jessica, Sunday, and Will—drew rocks to resolve the vote; Jessica picked the black rock and was therefore eliminated.)	5–0 (Note: Adam played a hidden immunity idol on Hannah; therefore, four votes against her were not counted.)	6–2	4–2–0 (Note: Jay played a hidden immunity idol; therefore, one vote against him was not counted.)	5–0 (Note: Ken played the legacy advantage; therefore, one vote against him was not counted.)	3–2	3–1
Voter	Vote																		
Adam		Figgy				Figgy		Michelle	Taylor	Chris	Zeke	Zeke	White rock	Zeke	Will	Sunday	Jay	David	David
Hannah		Mari					Bret	Michelle	Jay	Chris	Zeke	None (Note: This player was not eligible to vote in the second round of voting.)	Immune	Zeke	Will	Sunday	Jay	Bret	David
Ken	Rachel		Paul	~~Jessica~~		Figgy		Michelle	Taylor	Chris	Zeke	Zeke	Immune (Note: David played a hidden immunity idol on Ken; therefore, Ken was immune during the rock draw.)	Zeke	Will	Sunday	Jay	Bret	David
David	Rachel		Paul	Lucy	CeCe			Michelle	Taylor	Chris	Zeke	Zeke	White rock	Zeke	Will	Sunday	Jay	Bret	Adam
Bret	Rachel		CeCe	~~Jessica~~			Michaela	Michelle	Jay	Jessica	Hannah	Hannah	White rock	~~Hannah~~	Will	David	Jay	David	
Jay		Mari					Michaela	Adam	Taylor	Jessica	Hannah	Hannah	Immune	~~Hannah~~	David	David	~~Ken~~		
Sunday	CeCe		Paul	~~Jessica~~			Michaela	Michelle	Taylor	Jessica	Hannah	Hannah	White rock	~~Hannah~~	Will	~~Jay~~			
Will		Mari					Michaela	Adam	Jay	Chris	Hannah	Hannah	White rock	Zeke	David				
Zeke		Figgy			CeCe			Michelle	Taylor	Chris	Hannah	None	Immune	~~Hannah~~					
Jessica	CeCe		Paul	CeCe		Figgy		Michelle	Jay	Chris	Zeke	Zeke	Black rock						
Chris	Rachel		CeCe	~~Jessica~~	CeCe			Michelle	Taylor	Jessica									
Taylor		Mari				Ken		Adam	Adam										
Michelle		Mari			CeCe			Adam											
Michaela		Mari					Bret												
Figgy		Mari				Ken													
CeCe	David		Paul	Lucy	Michelle														
Lucy	CeCe		Paul	~~Jessica~~															
Paul	Rachel		CeCe																
Mari		Figgy																	
Rachel	Sunday																		

Jury vote
Episode	14		
Day	39		
Finalist	Adam	Hannah	Ken
Votes	10–0–0		
Juror	Vote		
David	Yes		
Bret	Yes		
Jay	Yes		
Sunday	Yes		
Will	Yes		
Zeke	Yes		
Jessica	Yes		
Chris	Yes		
Taylor	Yes		
Michelle	Yes		

== Reception ==
This season received mainly positive reception by critics and fans alike, for the cast and their high level of gameplay, though the editing of the season received some criticism. Editor of Entertainment Weekly, Dalton Ross, ranked it as the 11th-best season of the series, praised the season as a whole stating that the finale was "yet another great piece of theater in what turned out to be a great season of Survivor. A season that remains great due to the crowning of a solid winner in Adam." He felt that "the season went from not bad to pretty good to legitimately great over the course of a few months," which he attributes to David's fake idol, calling it "the best fake immunity idol of all time" and "[how hard] the entire cast was playing." He praised the cast in particular and felt it was "an incredible season in general." Daniel Fienerg of The Hollywood Reporter initially had mixed feeling towards the season, calling it a "dud," but became much more positive towards the season later, stating that the season "had one of the strongest home stretches of any Survivor season in recent memory, if not any Survivor season ever." In 2020, "The Purple Rock Podcast" ranked Survivor: Millennials vs. Gen-X as the 13th-best season in the series, stating that the season has "several enjoyable narrative arcs, some nice interactions between the players, and some of those delicious tears that Probst loves so much." Later in the year, Inside Survivor ranked the season 21st out of 40 writing that "'Millennials vs. Gen-X' is such a zeitgeisty gimmick that screams ‘desperate ploy for ratings.’ However, ludicrous theme aside, the season itself is highly enjoyable with an array of memorable characters, exciting gameplay, and one of the most emotional endings in the show's history." In 2021, Rob Has a Podcast ranked Millennials vs. Gen-X 12th during the Survivor All-Time Top 40 Rankings podcast. In 2024, Nick Caruso of TVLine ranked this season 7th out of 47.
