= Chris Hammons =

American reality television contestant, lawyer, and former college football player

- Born: April 1, 1978 (age 48)
- Education: University of Oklahoma (B.A., J.D.)
- Occupations: Partner at Laird Hammons Laird; Television personality
- Organizations: Oklahoma Bar Association; Oklahoma County Bar Association
- Television: Survivor: Millennials vs. Gen X
- Spouse: Jennifer Prochaska
- Children: 2
- Football career

No. 81 – Oklahoma Sooners
- Position: Special teams / tight end

Personal information
- Listed height: 6 ft 3 in (1.91 m)
- Listed weight: 260 lb (118 kg)

Career information
- High school: Sulphur
- College: East Central (1996–97); Oklahoma (1997–2001)

Awards and highlights
- BCS national champion (2000)}

Christopher Hammons (born April 1, 1978), is an American lawyer best known for competing on the reality competition shows Survivor and The Amazing Race. In his college days, he played football for the University of Oklahoma.

== Early life ==
Hammons was born April 1, 1978, and grew up in Sulphur, Oklahoma. He and his family later moved to Wilburton, where they lived in a trailer without running water. In 1995, his father Billy Lowell Hammons was arrested in Arkansas on drug possession charges and, after pleading no contest, was subsequently sentenced to serve up to 40 years in prison. Chris Hammons would move back to Sulphur, where he played football and basketball at Sulphur High School.

== College years ==
In 1996, Hammons earned a scholarship to play football at East Central University (ECU) in Ada, Oklahoma. After only one year at ECU, he left the program and joined the football team at the University of Oklahoma (OU), as a walk-on. He was redshirted his first year at OU, but the following year, he finally saw some playing time with the Sooners, playing both tight end and special teams. After the 1998 season, OU head coach John Blake was fired, and was replaced by Bob Stoops, who awarded Hammons a full scholarship after becoming impressed by the redshirt walk-on's leadership abilities.

In 1999, Hammons scored his only touchdown with OU, off a pass from Josh Heupel in a game against Baylor. The Sooners went on to win that game, 41–10. Hammons also led his team in receptions that day, and after the game, he was awarded the game ball for his efforts.

In his senior year, injuries limited his playing time, and he was relegated to playing special teams only, though he would be named one of the Sooners' team captains for the 2000 season. That year, Oklahoma finished the regular season undefeated, won the Big 12 title, and was invited to play Florida State in the Orange Bowl on January 3, 2001, for the national championship. At the start of the game, Hammons and the other team captains met at midfield for the opening coin toss. With the television cameras pointed right at him, he gave a shout-out to his incarcerated father by screaming, "What's up, Dad?" Oklahoma would go on to win the Orange Bowl to claim the national championship for OU.

== Career and family ==
Hammons graduated Oklahoma in 2001 with a Bachelor of Arts degree in history, and would later attend law school and earn his Juris Doctor. His first job as a lawyer was with the firm of Foshee & Yaffe in Oklahoma City. His first case as an attorney had him defending a client who had been charged with a double felony. The trial resulted in an acquittal.

In 2005, Hammons was at the law office one day when he met a young physical therapy student named Jennifer Prochaska. The two of them would soon marry, and together they would have two sons, Costner and Jacks. Hammons' father-in-law Gary was also an attorney at F&Y at the time that Hammons and his future wife met.

Hammons' father, Billy Lowell, was released from prison after serving more than 11 years of his sentence. Billy Lowell Hammons died in 2014, at the age of 60.

In 2009, Hammons partnered with associate Jeff Laird, as well as Laird's son, to start their own OKC law firm, Laird Hammons Laird. Hammons' father-in-law would join them at LHL the following year.

== Survivor ==
Hammons is a huge fan of the television series Survivor. Having watched it since its premiere in 2000, he eventually decided to apply to be on the show. After several applications, he finally got the call to be on the program.

Hammons was selected to be in the cast of Survivor: Millennials vs. Gen X, the series' 33rd season overall, which aired in 2016. At the start of the game, Hammons, who was born in 1978, was assigned to the Takali tribe, along with other members of Generation X. During the reward challenge on Day 11, he made a huge defensive move in the water by restraining opponents Justin "Jay" Starrett and Adam Klein simultaneously, allowing teammate David Wright to swim to the goal and score a point for Takali. Hammons himself would go on to score the winning point for his tribe, to win the reward challenge.

On Day 13, a tribal reshuffle took place, and Hammons was switched to Vanua, formerly the tribe consisting entirely of millennials. There, he formed a bond with new tribemate Zeke Smith, who also happened to originally come from Oklahoma. Following the merge on Day 21, Hammons reunited with fellow Gen X-ers Bret Labelle and Sunday Burquest, who were separated from Hammons after being sent to Ikabula, a brand new tribe formed at the Day 13 tribal reshuffle. Before Tribal Council on Night 23, it was Hammons who suggested that his alliance vote out millennial Michelle Schubert, as she was perceived as being unlikely to possess, and play, a hidden immunity idol. Schubert was indeed voted out that night.

By Day 26, Hammons had become a target for elimination, by rival and former Takali tribe-mate Wright. On Day 28, Hammons tried to convince the millennials to join him, Burquest, and Labelle in voting against Jessica Lewis, whom Hammons had been targeting for quite some time. At Tribal Council on Night 28, only Starrett voted with Hammons' alliance; the remaining millennials voted with Wright and his allies. By a vote of 7–4, Hammons was sent out of the game at 11th place, making him the third member of the jury. After leaving the Tribal Council area, he realized that his ally Smith was among those who had turned against him.

At the Final Tribal Council, Hammons praised Klein for having the gumption to convince fellow finalist Ken McNickle to flip on Wright at the Final Four—although McNickle would claim that it was his decision alone to vote out Wright. Hammons went on to lobby the jury to vote for Klein to be the game's winner. In the end, the entire jury, including Hammons, voted to give Klein the title of Sole Survivor, over finalists Hannah Shapiro and McNickle.

== The Amazing Race ==
Hammons competed in Season 31 of The Amazing Race, which featured past players from CBS reality shows Survivor and Big Brother, as well as teams from previous seasons of The Amazing Race. Hammons was teamed up with Survivor 33 alumni and friend Bret Labelle. Hammons and Labelle were eliminated in sixth place.
