= Smosh =

American independent comedy-improv production company

Comedy career
- Years active: 2002–present
- Medium: Internet
- Genres: Sketch comedy; Improv; Gaming

YouTube information
- Channels: Smosh; Smosh Pit; Smosh Games; SmoshCast; SmoshAlike
- Years active: 2005–present
- Subscribers: 27.2 million
- Views: 11.4 billion
- Last updated: October 19, 2026
- Website: smosh.com

Smosh Productions, Inc.
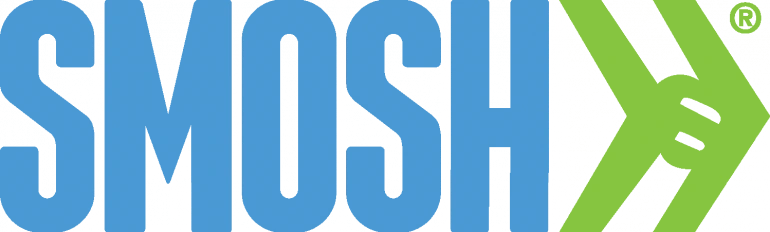
- Trade name: Smosh
- Type: Private
- Industry: Entertainment
- Founded: 2005; 21 years ago
- Founders: Anthony Padilla; Ian Hecox
- Headquarters: Los Angeles, California, U.S.
- Area served: Worldwide
- Key people: Alessandra Catanese (CEO); Cory Midgarden (CCO); Amanda Barnes (EVP, production); Nate Deas (EVP, people and operations); Kiana Parker (EVP, programming and development)
- Owners: Defy Media (2011–2018); Mythical Entertainment (2019–2023); Anthony Padilla (2023–present); Ian Hecox (2023–present)
- Number of employees: 50+ (2026)

Smosh Productions, Inc., commonly referred to as Smosh (/smɒʃ/), is an American independent comedy-improv production company and former social networking site founded by Anthony Padilla and Ian Hecox. In 2002, Padilla created a website named "smosh.com" for making Flash animations, and he was later joined by Hecox. They began posting videos on Smosh's YouTube channel in 2005 and quickly became one of the most popular channels on the site. As of June 2026, the main Smosh channel has over 11 billion views and over 27 million subscribers.

Initially making lip-sync videos to cartoon and video game-based songs, Smosh garnered virality for their "Pokémon Theme Music Video"; reaching 24 million views, it became the most-viewed video on YouTube until it was removed from the site due to copyright infringement. Smosh pivoted towards comedic sketches geared towards pop culture media, with Hecox and Padilla portraying various characters. Making web series such as Food Battle, If X Were Real and Every [Blank] Ever, Smosh continued to garner online popularity throughout the 2010s. Their sketches progressed in production quality as they included more cast and crew members.

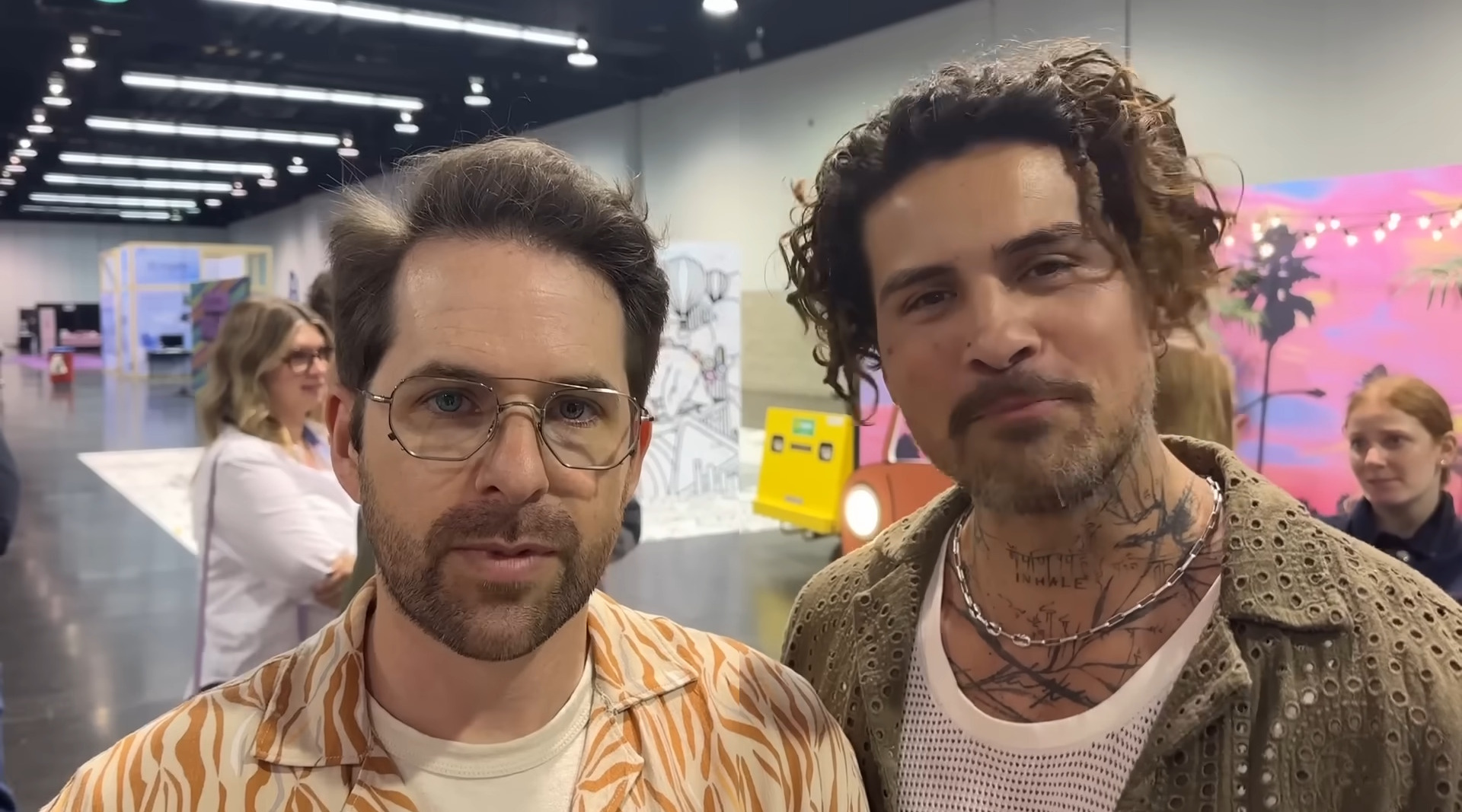
Ian Hecox (left) and Anthony Padilla (right) at VidCon 2025

Owned by media company Defy Media starting from 2011, the brand expanded to consist of multiple channels, including a variety channel (Smosh Pit), animation (Shut Up! Cartoons), and gaming content (Smosh Games). In 2017, Padilla left the channel to pursue independent ventures and focus on creating solo content. One year later, Defy Media abruptly closed without warning, leading the Smosh cast to become temporarily independent. They subsequently joined Mythical Entertainment after their company was purchased by Rhett & Link in 2019. After four years of ownership under Mythical, Padilla returned to the channel in 2023, and alongside Hecox had bought the company back from Mythical, re-establishing Smosh as an independent entity.

Considered one of the earliest YouTube personalities and content creators, Smosh has achieved various records and accolades. The Smosh channel has experienced three different spans as the most subscribed YouTube channel. Hecox and Padilla were included in the Forbes 30 Under 30 list, and were often included in lists of the highest-paid YouTubers. The Smosh brand has won Webby Awards, Shorty and Streamy Awards.

== History ==
=== Formation and lip sync videos (2002–2006) ===
The franchise began when Anthony Padilla built a website in 2002, smosh.com, and made several different Flash animations, with the name "Smosh" coming from an incident where he mistook a friend explaining a mosh pit as a "smosh pit". Padilla created the website's logo through juxtaposing a fast-forward sign and the letter "S" from a Linkin Park-based text font.

Later, his friend, Ian Hecox, joined the venture; Padilla and Hecox first met in the sixth grade. They became friends, and quickly discovered their knack for comedy. In 2005, the duo created lip sync videos of the theme songs to Mortal Kombat and Power Rangers, which were created in Padilla's bedroom at his family's home in Carmichael, California. They initially hosted the videos on smosh.com and their MySpace page, but discovered YouTube after finding their Mortal Kombat video uploaded on the website, where it garnered several thousand views. They officially joined YouTube on November 19, 2005, uploading three videos on the same day: the Power Rangers and Mortal Kombat videos with The Epic Battle: Jesus vs Cyborg Satan sketch, with the former being their first video uploaded.

One of Smosh's earliest videos, "Pokemon [sic] Theme Music Video", was released on November 28, 2005, and followed the same style as their other earlier videos, featuring the duo lip-syncing the original English theme song for the Pokémon anime. The video's creation followed an audience poll the duo posted on MySpace for their next video, where Pokémon won. However, the video instantly became much more popular than any of their other videos. Over the course of its lifetime, it gained over 24 million views, and briefly became the most-viewed video on all of YouTube. This held that title until being dethroned by Judson Laipply's "Evolution of Dance". The success of their Pokémon video and other videos led Smosh to be featured in the "Person of the Year: You" issue of Time, published on December 16, 2006. The video was later removed from the site in 2007 due to a copyright infringement claim. Due to the channel's continued success, and Smosh's partnership with YouTube, the two recreated the video in November 2010, this time changing the words to be critical of The Pokémon Company taking down the Pokémon theme video.

=== Initial YouTube success and early expansion (2006–2011) ===
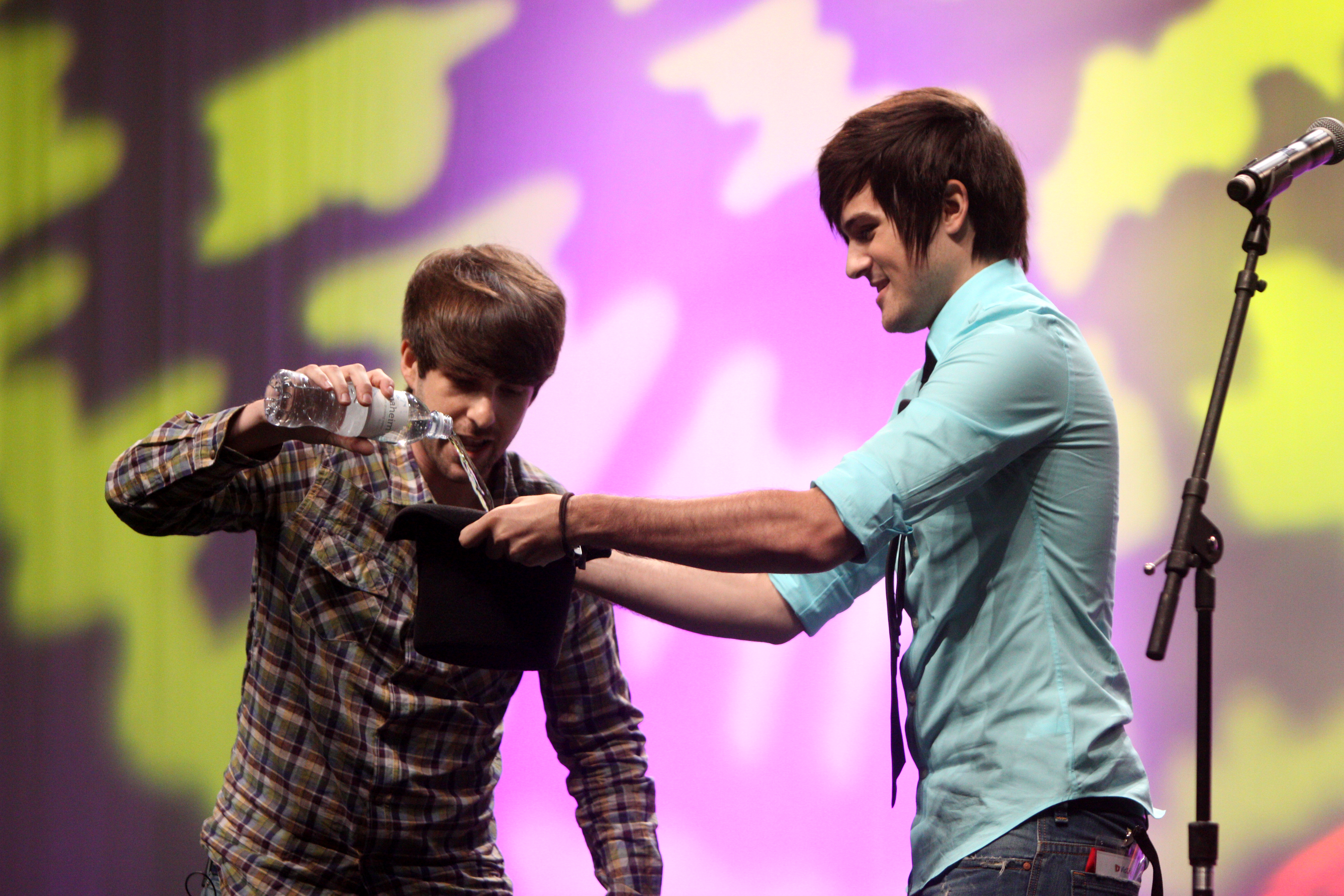
Hecox (left) and Padilla (right) performing at Vidcon 2012

Over the course of the next few years, Smosh began to diversify. Barry Blumberg, former president of Walt Disney Television Animation, discovered Hecox and Padilla's videos in 2006, and came in contact with them to become their manager. Blumberg helped the duo obtain a spot among YouTube's Partner program in 2007, allowing Smosh to monetize their content. He also persuaded the duo to develop a schedule for video creation. Blumberg's involvement in Smosh was credited by several outlets as pivotal for the brand's diversification.

By 2006, they transitioned to making original comedy skits, which were primarily filmed in and around a house in Rosemont, California. During this time, they created various series such as Food Battle, That Damn Neighbor, and If X Were Real. Smosh also launched a second channel based on Hecox's individual "IanH" account that he created in 2006, which contained behind-the-scenes footage and extras. Smosh became the most-subscribed YouTube channel from May to June 2006, and from April 2007 to September 2008. The Smosh website would also see expansion as well. It hosted their videography alongside bloopers and exclusive footage from their sketch videos. The website also provided additional revenue for Smosh via advertising and merchandise. In January 2010, Smosh launched the "Smosh Pit" feature, a blog that consists of various pieces of pop-culture trivia, and written comedy. They hired Mariko "Mari" Takahashi in 2011 to host the Smosh Pit Weekly series on their second channel, which summarized content from Smosh Pit.

=== Defy Media, further expansion and Padilla's departure (2011–2018) ===
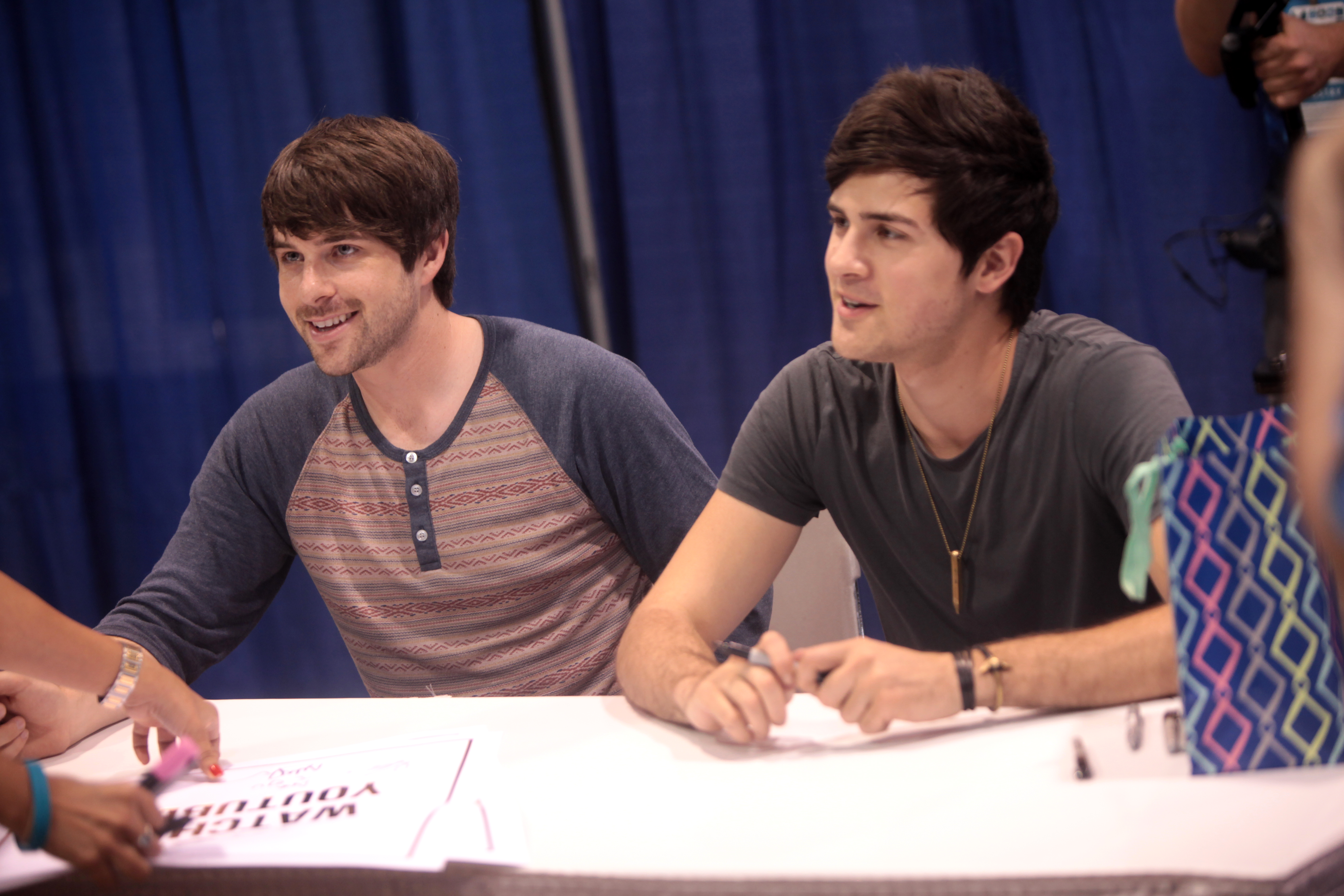
Hecox (left) and Padilla (right) at VidCon 2014

In 2011, Smosh was acquired by Alloy Digital (later rebranded to Defy Media), while also enjoying a 40% boost in viewership. Blumberg would also become the chief content officer of Defy Media. The duo created three new YouTube channels throughout 2012: ElSmosh, with Smosh videos dubbed in Spanish, Shut Up! Cartoons, their animation channel, and Smosh Games, with gaming-related content. In January 2013, the Smosh channel surpassed Ray William Johnson in subscribers to become the most-subscribed YouTube channel for the third time. They held this position until August 2013 when they were surpassed by Swedish Let's Player PewDiePie, who also collaborated with the duo shortly after reaching the position. By December 2014, the Smosh website had accumulated over 60 million page views, and according to Alexa Internet was ranked among the top websites in the world.

In 2015, Smosh began hiring cast members for their videos, including Noah Grossman, Keith Leak Jr., Olivia Sui, Courtney Miller and Shayne Topp. They began appearing in sketches such as the Every (Blank) Ever series, which started in May 2015. In January 2016, a web sitcom was launched on the main Smosh channel. Part Timers is a comedy-drama which takes place at a fictional children's arcade and pizza place called Pork E. Pine's, which takes inspiration from Hecox's first job at Chuck E. Cheese's. Also that year, the Smosh cast streamed a live sketch show on YouTube on August 26. Compared to Saturday Night Live, the 90 minute show featured improvisational sketches and fake TV commercials, which Hecox and Padilla stated was an adjustment from their typical scripted comedy. Regarded as the first live sketch show on YouTube, the stream reached around 58,000 concurrent viewers and over 1.3 million views within several days. Smosh also launched several short-lived web series in the fall of 2016, which was dubbed "Smoshtober"; the programming block succeeded Defy's raising of $70 million during the summer.

On June 14, 2017, Padilla announced he would be leaving Smosh to pursue independent video ventures due to a "lack in creative freedom". Hecox stated he would remain with Smosh, adding "I'm really looking forward to taking Smosh to the next phase, and we can't wait for people to see what we have coming up". Blumberg also resigned from his position at Defy earlier that year in March. Following Padilla's departure, Smosh expanded their second channel into Smosh Pit while adding multiple series. The Smosh Pit Weekly series, which had ended in 2015, was revived with Takahashi hosting once more.

=== Under Mythical Entertainment's ownership (2018–2023) ===
On November 6, 2018, Defy Media abruptly announced they were shutting down and laying off all its employees. On November 12, Smosh released an update video reaffirming that Smosh was searching for a new owner, and that in the meanwhile, content would continue to be released independently by the Smosh team. The cast clarified that they still had a significant amount of content from before Defy Media's shutdown in post-production. They also did not rule out the possibility of filming new content and releasing it independently, calling such an idea "old school", alluding to YouTube's early days when content was less commercialized.

Padilla released a video the following day explaining in further detail his departure from Smosh, alongside his issues regarding Defy's ownership of the brand. Declaring Defy as "evil and shady", he revealed that he and Hecox sold Smosh to Defy for stock, which had no monetary value because the company never went public. Padilla also expressed dissatisfaction with Defy's treatment of its employees and stated the company exploited them financially, took over his Facebook page, tried to take over his Twitter account, and prevented him from joining the Screen Actors Guild (SAG). He also revealed that Defy had pressured them into starting a fundraiser for Food Battle: The Game before it had even been conceived, something that had at the time led to accusations of exploitation being levied against himself and Hecox. He also explained that he had not previously shared this information because of worries that it would threaten the job security of his friends. Hecox later revealed in a March 2019 interview with TheWrap that throughout the brand's ownership under Defy, they suffered through "aimless and poor leadership", and that had they not found a suitable company to buy the brand that he "would not continue with the brand."

On February 22, 2019, Smosh was acquired by Mythical Entertainment, a production company founded by fellow YouTube comedians Rhett & Link. A majority of the Smosh cast and crew returned to the company following the acquisition. Smosh also created a new weekly podcast, "SmoshCast", following the announcement. During this time, Smosh operated out of Mythical Entertainment's Los Angeles office, though later moved into a specially built studio space in Burbank. Smosh subsequently joined the Studio71 network in April. They later hired several new staff following the acquisition: Daniel Tibbets as their first CEO in October 2021; Lesley Wolff as their director of on-air talent in April 2022; and Joel Rubin as their Executive Vice President of Programming and Content in July 2022.

In October 2019, Smosh announced they would go on their first live tour in February 2020 across five cities: Seattle, Portland, Sacramento, San Diego and Phoenix. The tour is based on their "Try Not To Laugh" web series, which involves the cast members performing improvisational skits towards an individual member in an attempt to make them laugh. Smosh created another live show in a similar manner as their 2016 stream, named "Under the Influence". The stream featured the cast performing sketches alongside reenacting several of their segments, including "Try Not To Laugh" and "Eat It or Yeet It", while under the influence. The stream aired on June 30, 2022. They hosted a similar event on December 15, 2022 called "Under the Mistletoe."

=== Padilla's return and Smosh as an independent venture (2023–present) ===
On June 20, 2023, Hecox and Padilla announced the latter's return to Smosh after the duo had decided to repurchase a majority stake in Smosh from Mythical Entertainment, making Smosh an independent entity again. Mythical Entertainment agreed to maintain a minority stake and continue to have involvement in an advisory capacity. With this change, Padilla promoted Alessandra Catanese, the COO and executive producer from his own company Pressalike Productions, as CEO of the new Smosh entity; Rubin and Tibbets both exited the company. It was stated that the main Smosh channel would return to a more sketch-oriented output, moving away from the pivot to more improv-based content in the years prior. However, the unscripted Smosh Pit and Smosh Games channels would remain as they were. They also launched a subscription-based membership program which offers exclusive content such as behind-the-scenes videos and live streams.

Following Padilla's return to Smosh, the channel initially returned to the sketch comedy format primarily featuring the duo, including revisiting past sketches such as their "Stop Copying Me" video and Food Battle. Their current output focuses on Bit City, a series advertised as "if Smosh did a late-night talk show" which features various cast members such as Hecox, Padilla, and hosts Angela Giarratana and Chanse McCrary. Bit City premiered on August 23, 2024.

== Channels ==
=== Smosh ===
Smosh is the original and main channel created in November 2005, with current output focusing around the show Bit City.

=== Smosh Pit ===
The Smosh Pit channel uploads every Tuesday, Thursday, and Saturday. The videos mostly consist of a variety of unscripted formats including game shows and challenges involving the cast. Popular series include Try Not to Laugh, Challenge Pit and Reading Reddit Stories. This was originally Ian Hecox's personal channel (titled Ian H) before undergoing a rebrand in 2017.

=== Smosh Games ===
The Smosh Games channel uploads every Wednesday, Friday, and Sunday. The videos consist of playing video games, board games, and card games, with various recurring games and series.

=== SmoshCast ===
Smosh's podcast channel currently consists of Smosh Mouth, which is hosted by Shayne Topp and Amanda Lehan-Canto. Each episode usually features a distinct theme and a guest from amongst Smosh's cast and production crew.

=== Smosh Alike ===
Originally Anthony Padilla's personal channel, it began posting content more frequently after Padilla's departure from Smosh in 2017. Upon his return to owning the Smosh brand with Ian Hecox in 2023, the channel began featuring Smosh cast members while remaining an independent part of Padilla's PressAlike production. On May 5, 2025, the channel rebranded to SmoshAlike, bringing the channel and PressAlike under the Smosh brand.

=== ElSmosh ===
ElSmosh uploads new Smosh episodes that have been dubbed over in Spanish. The videos are mostly from the main Smosh channel. It was originally created by a fan who dubbed Smosh videos in the language, and Hecox and Padilla hired them. The channel is currently inactive.

== Other ventures ==
=== App and game development ===
Smosh has branched out into various ventures related to digital media, including app and game development. In early 2010, Smosh created the "iShut Up App" for Android phones as part of a Google sponsorship; it eventually made its way to the iTunes app store. In February 2013, they released the Super Head Esploder X video game for iOS, which became the most downloaded game in the App Store within its first week. The same year in July, they also started an Indiegogo campaign for an iOS and PC game, Food Battle: The Game, which was based on their characters and the foods used in their annual Food Battle series. Lasting for 33 days from July 22 to August 24, the campaign raised $259,247 in total over a $250,000 goal, with Hecox and Padilla donating 10% of the funds to the "DoSomething", "Child's Play" and "FEED USA" charities. An action RPG inspired by games such as The Legend of Zelda and The Witcher 2, the game was released in 2014. Smosh also released another mobile app to access Smosh videos and other content from their website, which was also available on the Xbox One.

=== Books ===
In 2013, Smosh created Smosh Magazine which consisted of comics, interviews and behind-the-scenes content. The magazine ran exclusively in the United States for two editions with 40,000 copies produced, alongside a digital download on iTunes. Throughout 2015 and 2016, Smosh partnered with Dynamite Entertainment to publish a comic book and graphic novel series. Comic writers Michael McDermott and Yale Stewart co-wrote the book with Stewart contributing illustration, and Hecox and Padilla were credited for developing the story with Dynamite editor Rich Young. The six-issue series contains the "Super Virgin Squad" story written by McDermott, which chronicles the titular group as possessing superhuman abilities. Stewart also penned "That Damn Neighbor" based on the Smosh web series. The first issue was released in May 2016.

=== Films ===
On September 18, 2014, it was announced that a feature-length film starring the duo was in development by AwesomenessFilms; it would be later titled Smosh: The Movie, and was released direct-to-video on July 24, 2015, by 20th Century Fox Home Entertainment, with Netflix acquiring the film's streaming rights. Directed by Alex Winter from a screenplay by Eric Falconer and Steve Marmel, it stars both Hecox and Padilla as fictionalized versions of themselves, alongside fellow YouTube personalities Jenna Marbles, Grace Helbig, Harley Morenstein, Mark Fischbach, Dominic Sandoval, and the Smosh Games crew, with Shane Dawson appearing in the Unrated version.

Smosh created the film Ghostmates for YouTube Red that was released on December 14, 2016. Channel collaborator Ryan Finnerty wrote the screenplay with Hecox and Padilla, with Jack Henry Robbins directing the film. The film chronicles Hecox's character as a ghost following his accidental death, who becomes the roommate of Padilla's character after the latter moves into his apartment. The film also features a cameo from rapper T-Pain as a ghost.

=== Philanthropy and media appearances ===
Smosh participated in the Prank It Forward series starting in 2014, which focused on raising money for charity with prank-based videos. They interviewed several celebrities in the series, including Emma Watson and Jennifer Lawrence. Proceeds from the videos went to the DoSomething charity, where $1 was donated for every 1000 video views accumulated. The next year, Smosh appeared in a charity stream with The Game Theorists for The Brain and Behavior Research Foundation during Giving Week, and autographed a custom Xbox One console for Microsoft's partnership with Make-A-Wish in the Consoles for Kids charity auction. For the channel's 15th anniversary, Smosh hosted a Twitch charity stream for the First Nations Development Institute which raised $17,000. Members of Smosh also participated in the "Creators for Palestine" fundraiser in July 2024.

Smosh has appeared in various episodes of YouTube Rewind. Hecox and Padilla also appeared as guest judges on the Internet Icon series throughout 2012 and 2013, and participated in YouTube's Comedy Week in May 2013. The duo appeared in a promotion for Watch Dogs with Rob Dyrdek in 2014. They also had voice roles in the 2016 animated film The Angry Birds Movie, and appeared in an episode of the Epic Rap Battles of History web series.

== Legacy ==
=== Popularity and reception ===
One of the first personalities to gain popularity on YouTube, Smosh has been regarded as among the most popular channels on the website, and an early example of an Internet celebrity. They have also been credited as pioneers and innovators of the platform. News outlets have referred to the brand as a media empire. Their authenticity was recognized as a factor for their popularity. BuzzFeed News and Variety both observed their relatability among audiences and their relationship among their fans. Compared to traditional celebrities, Smosh and other Internet personalities were typically deemed as more engaging and authentic among adolescents. Troy Dreier of Streaming Media Magazine ascribed their fan base's affinity of the duo to their image "as likeable (if crazy) guys next door." However, author Aaron Duplantier stated that their videos eschewed intimate self-expression, instead focusing on comedic skits.

Their videos have received a positive reception from several outlets. Likening them to Saturday Night Live, Grossman opined that "[t]heir genius ... is in their unswerving, unwinking commitment to idiocy." Matheson claimed that their humor worked for its seditious and crude, yet inoffensive nature. She also praised Smosh for Hecox and Padilla's lack of embarrassment or fear, and their enjoyment of "mucking around" as a reason for retaining their viewership. Several outlets highlighted their exaggerated acting style and penchant for juvenile, yet appealing humor. Borden noted their acting style emphasized their personalities over finesse, while Petersen asserted that if one "find[s] their humor juvenile, you're missing the point: It's not for you." Kennedy Unthank of Plugged In praised the channel's nostalgic value and longevity alongside the duo's friendship. However, he raised concerns of their use of profanities, sexual humor and death in their sketches. Smosh's various cast members have also received praise for their acting style and character work.

=== Impact and longevity ===
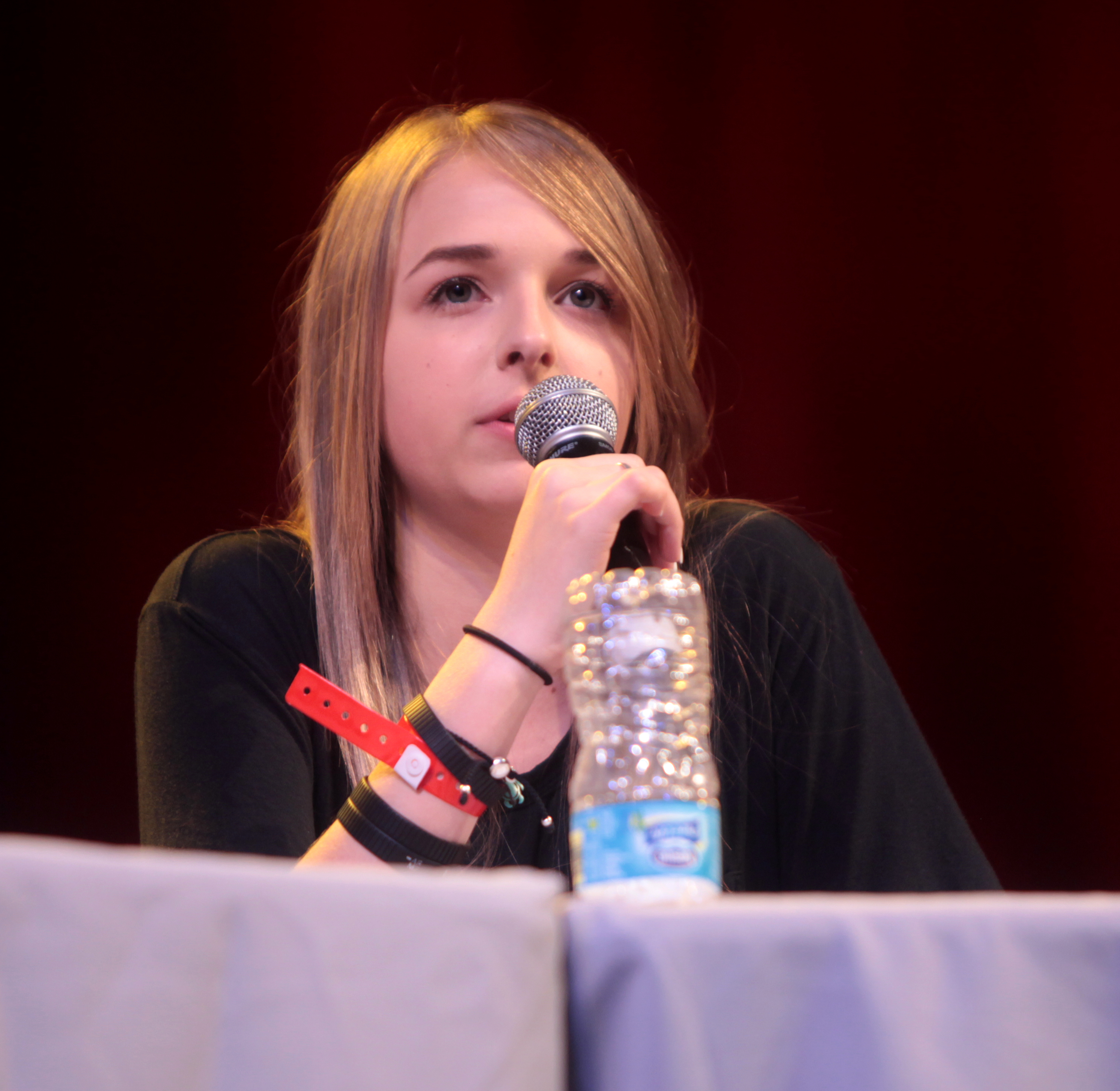
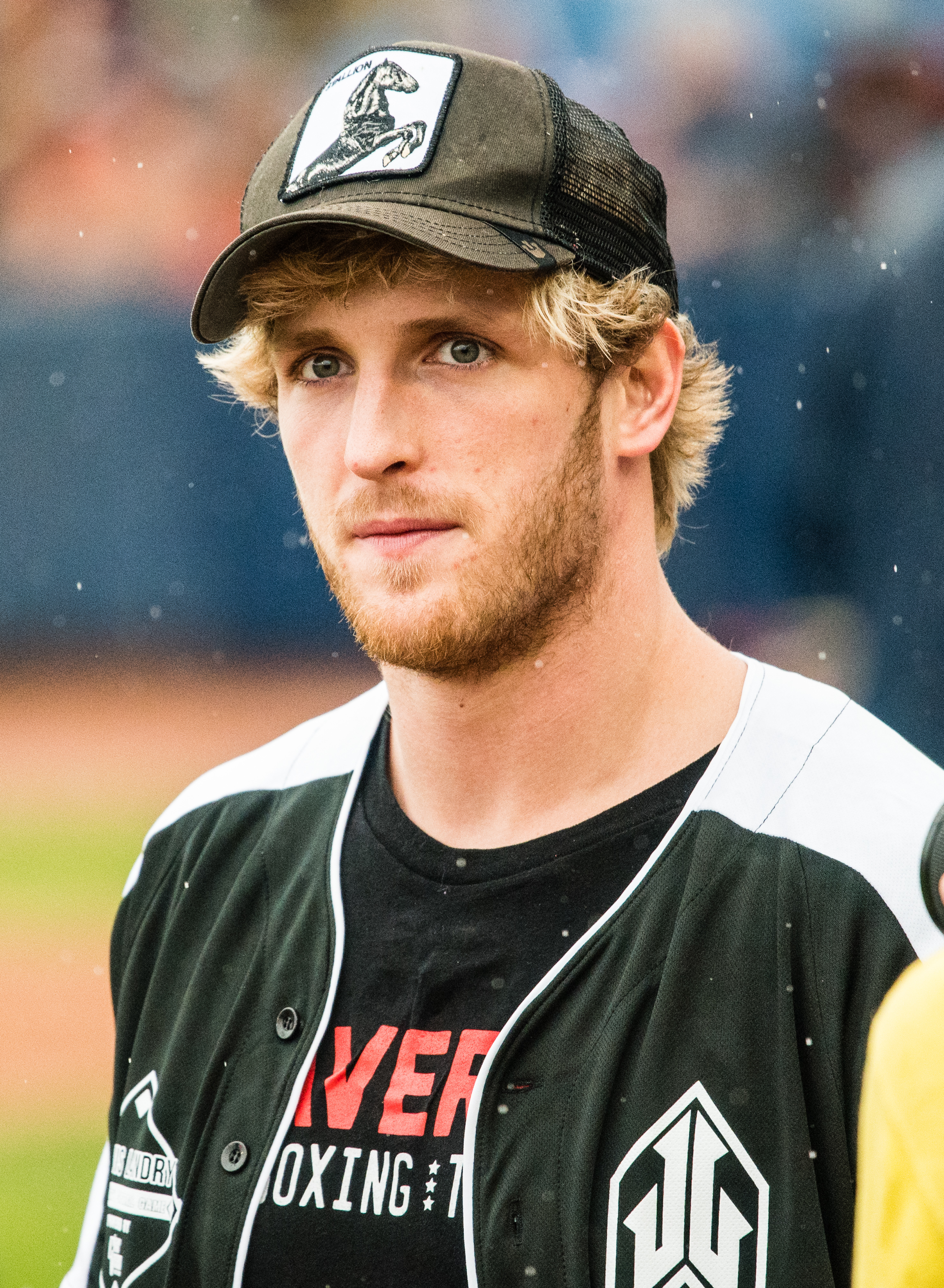
Personalities such as Jenn McAllister and Logan Paul were among the YouTubers inspired by Smosh.

Among researchers, Smosh's popularity has been regarded as increasing the recognition of the Internet as a creative medium, and they were recognized with other personalities as representing a generation of creators distributing content via social media. Grady Smith of Entertainment Weekly opined that their success on YouTube "reshape[d] the site into a vast entertainment entity that produces so much more than Web-based novelty acts." Their 2006 video Feet for Hands, which featured the Zvue audio player as part of a promotional deal, was cited as an early example of influencer marketing by journalist Chris Stokel-Walker. Author Kelli S. Burns credited the duo with popularizing the lip-synch video genre in her 2009 book Celeb 2.0. Various content creators have regarded Smosh as an inspiration. YouTubers Jake and Logan Paul were inspired by Smosh to create their first channel, Zoosh, in 2006. Jenn McAllister was likewise inspired to create her channel, writing in her autobiography that their 2007 Spiderman, Spiderman sketch was the first YouTube video she watched. Musician and YouTuber Emma Blackery also regarded Smosh as an influence.

Smosh has been noted for their focus on internet-based ventures and longevity in internet popularity by various outlets. In a 2015 CNET interview, writer Joan E. Solsman attributed their popularity to the early timing of their YouTube presence. Dorothy Pomerantz of Forbes claimed a similar viewpoint regarding their beginnings in a 2013 article, describing them as a "purely digital breed of star." Both Fast Company and Forbes highlighted their early diversification into online media as opposed to traditional media, with the former outlet recognizing such expansion as a realization of the changes in YouTube's algorithm. A 2017 Tubefilter article mentioned that compared to early YouTube creators who have since faded into obscurity, Smosh continued to upload content while expanding their brand. The same year, a Mashable article also remarked on their lasting popularity in comparison to other YouTube content creators; writer Saba Hamedy claimed that the duo "still haven't fallen out of the internet's favor. Ten years in and that's saying something: viral stars don't often survive their fan's short attention spans."

Various commentators noted Smosh's legacy following Padilla's return to the channel. NBC News listed Smosh as among the original YouTube channels to return in 2023, noting fan enthusiasm for the return of "classic Smosh". Morgan Sung of TechCrunch claimed that their reunion as an independent entity was "setting the precedent for creators to own and define their contents' legacy", and regarded it as a victory for content creators. TheGamer's Jade King similarly considered Smosh's return to be a "rare victory" for both YouTube and the Internet, reflecting on the duo's friendship and the brand's history.

=== Achievements ===
Smosh has been awarded various accolades throughout their career. Hecox and Padilla were both listed in the Forbes 30 Under 30 list in 2012 and 2014 for the entertainment category. The same outlet has listed the Smosh brand as among the highest-paid YouTube personalities throughout the 2010s – in 2015, 2016 and 2017. In a 2014 survey from the University of Southern California published by Variety, they were ranked the number 1 most influential personality among U.S. teenagers, listed ahead of celebrities including Jennifer Lawrence and Leonardo DiCaprio. They placed at number 5 in a similar survey the following year. The same year, Hecox and Padilla were among the first internet personalities to obtain sculptures from the Madame Tussauds wax museum, alongside Jenna Marbles, Zoella and Alfie Deyes. In May 2025, VidCon announced that Smosh will be included in their inaugural Hall of Fame, dedicated to honoring content creators.

Smosh has held multiple YouTube records. They once held the most-viewed video on YouTube with their Pokémon theme song. They have held the record for the most-subscribed YouTube channel in three periods – May to June 2006, August 2007 to September 2008, and January to August 2013. Smosh was the first YouTube channel to reach ten million subscribers, and received the YouTube Diamond Creator Award. From 2006 to 2017, it was the only channel to consistently remain within the top-ten most subscribed list.

Awards and nominations for Smosh
Year	Award	Category	Recipient	Result	Ref(s)
2007	2007 YouTube Awards	Comedy	"Smosh Short 2: Stranded"	Won	
2009	2009 Webby Awards	Experimental & Weird	"Sex Ed Rocks"	Nominated	
2010	2010 Webby Awards	Viral	"If Movies Were Real"	Nominated	
2013	3rd Streamy Awards	Best Comedy Series	Smosh	Nominated	
2013	3rd Streamy Awards	Audience Choice for Personality of the Year	Smosh	Nominated	
2013	3rd Streamy Awards	Best Animated Series	Oishi High School Battle	Nominated	
2013	2013 Webby Awards	Branded Entertainment Short Form	"Ultimate Assassin's Creed 3 Song"	Nominated	
2013	2013 Social Star Awards	Most Popular Social Show	Smosh	Nominated	
2013	2013 Social Star Awards	North American Social Media Star	Smosh	Won	
2014	4th Streamy Awards	Best Comedy Channel, Show, or Series	Smosh	Nominated	
2014	4th Streamy Awards	Best Gaming Channel, Show, or Series	Smosh Games	Won	
2015	Seventh Annual Shorty Awards	YouTube Star of the Year presented by A&E	Smosh	Won	
2015	5th Streamy Awards	Show of the Year	Smosh	Nominated	
2015	5th Streamy Awards	Best Gaming Channel, Show, or Series	Smosh Games	Nominated	
2016	2016 Webby Awards	Gaming (channel)	Smosh Games	Won	
2016	6th Streamy Awards	Gaming	Smosh Games	Nominated	
2016	6th Streamy Awards	Food	Put it in My Mouth	Nominated	
2017	7th Streamy Awards	Live	Smosh Live	Won	
2017	7th Streamy Awards	Gaming	Smosh Games	Won	

== Current cast members ==
Performer	Time on Smosh
Ian Hecox	2005–present
Anthony Padilla	2005–2017; 2023–present
Keith Leak Jr.	2014–present
Noah Grossman	2015–present
Courtney Miller	2015–present
Olivia Sui	2015–present
Shayne Topp	2015–present
Damien Haas	2017–present
Amanda Lehan-Canto	2020–present
Angela Giarratana	2022–present
Chanse McCrary	2022–present
Spencer Agnew	2024–present
Tommy Bowe	2024–present
Trevor Evarts	2024–present
Eli Gonzalez	2026–present
Tatyana "Guchi" Komaguchi	2026–present
Courtney Theophin	2026–present
Emily Wirth	2026–present

== Discography ==
=== Albums ===
List of albums, with selected chart positions
Title	Album details	Peak chart positions	
Title	Album details	US Comedy	US Heat.
Sexy Album	Released: December 15, 2010; Formats: Digital download	11	—
If Music Were Real	Released: November 11, 2011; Formats: CD, Digital download	5	26
Smoshtastic	Released: December 3, 2012; Formats: Digital download	3	27
The Sweet Sound of Smosh	Released: November 30, 2013; Formats: Digital download	4	33
Shut Up! and Listen	Released: December 10, 2015; Formats: Digital download	4	—
"—" denotes releases that did not enter a certain chart.

=== Singles ===
List of singles, with year released
Title	Year	Album
"Milky Milkshake"	2010	Sexy Album
"Firetruck!"	2010	Sexy Album
"My Fanny Pack"	2010	Sexy Album
"Cute Furry Kittens"	2010	Sexy Album
"Pokémon Theme Song Revenge"	2010	Sexy Album
"Vader Is My Friend"	2010	Sexy Album
"Meat in Your Mouth"	2011	If Music Were Real
"Happy Cow"	2011	If Music Were Real
"The Legend of Zelda Rap"	2011	If Music Were Real
"Parents Suck!"	2012	Smoshtastic
"Hair Ballad"	2012	Smoshtastic
"B F Fs"	2012	Smoshtastic
"Pen15"	2012	Smoshtastic
"Metal Mom"	2012	Smoshtastic
"Bot Best Friend"	2012	Smoshtastic
"Best Food in the World"	2012	Smoshtastic
"Ultimate Assassin's Creed 3 Song"	2012	Smoshtastic
"Dubstep Collection"	2012	Smoshtastic
"Driver's Ed Crap Rap"	2013	The Sweet Sound of Smosh
"Dixon Cider"	2013	The Sweet Sound of Smosh
"We Rule High School"	2013	The Sweet Sound of Smosh
"Pirate Life"	2013	The Sweet Sound of Smosh
"Ultimate Breakup Medley" (featuring Tara Jayne Sissom)	2014	Shut Up! and Listen
"The Real Party Song"	2014	Shut Up! and Listen
"My Bathroom Disaster"	2014	Shut Up! and Listen
"Ultimate Douchebag Medley"	2014	Shut Up! and Listen
"Vegan Cheesecake (Food Battle 2014)"	2014	Non-album singles
"Stick of Gum (Food Battle 2014)"	2014	Non-album singles
"Soy BBQ Rib (Food Battle 2014)"	2014	Non-album singles
"Rock Candy (Food Battle 2014)"	2014	Non-album singles
"Pineapple (Food Battle 2014)"	2014	Non-album singles
"Jawbreaker (Food Battle 2014)"	2014	Non-album singles
"Dragon Fruit (Food Battle 2014)"	2014	Non-album singles
"Bearclaw (Food Battle 2014)"	2014	Non-album singles
"Anything You Can Do I Can Do Dumber"	2014	Shut Up! and Listen
"Smash Rap"	2015	Shut Up! and Listen
"Sex Turban"	2015	Shut Up! and Listen
"F**kboy Song" (featuring Jon Cozart)	2017	Non-album singles
"Submissive & Breedable" (featuring bbno$)	2024	Non-album singles
"Promline" (performed by Tommy Bowe)	2026	Non-album singles
"Don't Let This Summer Stop" (performed by Courtney Miller)	2026	Non-album singles
"Bring 'Em Back (We Want Dinos)" (performed by Spencer Agnew)	2026	Non-album singles

Achievements
Preceded by N/A	Most Subscribed Channel on YouTube; 2006–2006	Succeeded by Judson Laipply
Preceded by lonelygirl15	Most Subscribed Channel on YouTube; 2007–2008	Succeeded by nigahiga
Preceded by Ray William Johnson	Most Subscribed Channel on YouTube; 2013–2013	Succeeded by PewDiePie
