= Smosh Games =

American YouTube channel

YouTube information
- Channel: Smosh Games
- Years active: 2012–present
- Genres: Entertainment; gaming
- Subscribers: 8.64 million
- Views: 4.3 billion
- Last updated: October 29, 2026

Smosh Games is a YouTube gaming channel owned by Smosh, initially launched in 2012. A collaborative venture between Smosh and ClevverGames by then joint owner Alloy Digital, the original members consisted of Smosh duo Anthony Padilla and Ian Hecox, with cast member Mari Takahashi along with ClevverGames members David "Lasercorn" Moss, Joshua "Jovenshire" Ovenshire, and Matt Sohinki. The channel's output consists of a variety of video game-based content, including gaming-commentary videos, news and reviews, and scripted web series, alongside board game-focused content. Several of their series have included Honest Game Trailers, 16-Bit High School, and tabletop-based shows Board AF and Sword AF. Between 2020 and 2022 this included live streaming on Twitch. They also formed the content creator network Smosh Games Alliance, and have participated in charity-based events.

Smosh Games was one of the fastest-growing channels following its formation in 2012, and has been recognized among media outlets as a key channel in Smosh's online popularity. The channel reached 1 million subscribers shortly after its launch, becoming one of the fastest YouTube accounts to reach the milestone. The channel has won two Streamy Awards and a Webby Award in their respective gaming categories.

== History and content ==
=== 2012–2018: Defy Era ===
Smosh Games officially launched on September 25, 2012 as a collaborative venture between the sketch comedy collective Smosh and the gaming channel ClevverGames. The channel's origins stemmed from several acquisitions by the media company Alloy Digital. In 2011, the Smosh brand was bought by Alloy following Smosh's rise in internet popularity through their comedy videos, several of which focused on gaming-related topics. The same year, the ClevverGames channel was founded and reached over 100,000 subscribers before its parent company, Clevver Media, was bought by Alloy in 2012. Desiring to build on the popularity of the Smosh brand, Alloy decided to create a new venture that folded ClevverGames into the wider brand under a new channel that would be titled Smosh Games. Smosh and ClevverGames announced Smosh Games on their respective channels, with the original members comprising Smosh founders Anthony Padilla and Ian Hecox; Smosh Pit Weekly cast member Mari Takahashi; and ClevverGames members David "Lasercorn" Moss, Joshua "Jovenshire" Ovenshire, and Matt Sohinki.

Noted for their personality-driven style of content, Smosh Games began with hosting varied gaming videos regarding news, reviews and gaming-commentary involving the members, uploading multiple videos per week. Their first video on the channel was of the gaming news series Smosh Action Gaming News Update Today (S.A.G.N.U.T), and they debuted other series such as Super Mari Fun Time, Gametime with Smosh, Smosh Game Bang, and Gamer Nation. In May 2013, the channel founded the Smosh Games Alliance, a multi-channel network centered on featuring gaming content creators alongside videography tips and community support. The same month, Smosh Games collaborated with Node – a gaming channel formed by members of FreddieW and Corridor Digital – to partake in a gaming competition Video Game Olympics.

Wesley "Wes" Johnson and Amra "Flitz" Ricketts joined Smosh Games in 2014. The same year, the channel debuted two web series: Honest Game Trailers and 16-Bit High School. The former series is a spin-off of the Break Media-based series Honest Trailers, satirizing video game advertisements, a reboot of the show that was previously owned by GameFront, then owned by Break Media. The latter series is an animated show chronicling video game characters in high school, similarly to Video Game High School; the show features YouTube personalities Jack Douglass, Hannah Hart, Jimmy Wong and Haley Mancini as voice actors. The two shows were created in the aftermath of Alloy Digital merging with Break Media to form Defy Media in 2013, and were credited as a progression in both the company and the Smosh brand. (Note: Screen Junkies, which produced the Honest Trailers series, was sold to Fandom in 2018 by Defy Media, and the Fandom Games channel would produce episodes of the Honest Game Trailers series.) Between late 2014 and early 2015, members of Smosh Games also collaborated with Wired on the latter's Game|Life series to discuss the best games of 2014 and of all time. Smosh Games also conducted an interview with video game developer Shigeru Miyamoto in a Mario Kart 8 gameplay video.

Smosh Games revived the Alliance network as a separate channel in 2015, with three new series hosted by Ricketts: Smosh University, focused on creation of Smosh Games videos; SGA Spotlight, which featured members of the network; and SGA Live! as a Smosh Games live stream. During 2016, Smosh Games' programming included several short-lived series, such as the VR-oriented Reality Shift and MariCraft Outsider, based on the MariCraft series where Takahashi played Minecraft. In 2017, Ericka "Boze" Bozeman and Damien Haas joined Smosh Games, though during that year both Lasercorn and Sohinki announced that they would no longer be members of Smosh Games. Ovenshire and Takahashi appeared in a three-episode web series based on Assassin's Creed Origins in 2017, where they traveled to Egypt and partook in activities related to the country's culture and the game.

=== 2018–present: Post-Defy ===
Ricketts resigned from Smosh Games in January 2018, due to allegations of sexual misconduct. The same year, Defy Media closed operations, and Smosh would be owned as an entity under Mythical Entertainment, owned by fellow YouTube personalities Rhett & Link. While the channel would continue, several cast members left the group during this time, including Bozeman, and Takahashi departed from Smosh in early 2020. Ovenshire would become a former member as well.

The channel also branched out to live streaming starting in August 2020, when it partnered with Twitch and created multiple series: the tabletop and card game-based Board AF Live, SG Gaming Live for playing new and requested games, and SG Meme Review Live as a meme-based show. Their first stream was on September 2, where they had accumulated over 57,000 followers prior. Smosh Games also hosted or participated in a number of charity live streams including St. Jude Children's Research Hospital's Play Live, and with Jackbox Games for the Stand Up To Cancer charity. Smosh ended its Twitch streams in March 2022.

In July 2023, Smosh Games debuted Sword AF, a Dungeons & Dragons series hosted by Haas with fellow Smosh members Shayne Topp, Amanda Lehan-Canto, Chanse McCrary, and Angela Giarratana. The series features Haas as a dungeon master narrating a campaign about a group of adventurers in search for job opportunities, such as couriers. The series uses the Warforged 5th edition rule set with the players using spell-casting roles and classic races. Created based on fan requests due to their previous series covering board games, Sword AF quickly became popular with its first episode receiving over 400,000 views within 24 hours, and 700,000 views within a week.

== Reception and popularity ==
Smosh Games is considered one of the most successful channels under the Smosh brand, and one of the most popular gaming and Let's Play channels on YouTube. In late December 2012, the channel was reported as the fastest channel to reach one million subscribers, achieving the milestone 93 days after its initial launch. At the beginning of 2013, Forbes reported the channel was logging 8,000 new subscribers per day. On Google Trends, the release of Smosh Games corresponded with Smosh's rise in search traffic on YouTube. Within six months, Smosh Games reached over 1.8 million subscribers and 200 million video views, and reached over 3.2 million subscribers and 400 million views by its one-year anniversary. By 2017, the channel reached over 7 million subscribers; and as of 2025, it has over 8 million subscribers and 3.3 billion views.

In a 2017 Polygon article, writer Julia Alexander compared Smosh Games to the state of YouTube content creation in the wake of several controversies and dramas among prominent channels. Alexander noted the group's more positive disposition, stating that "their shining light of positivity can often feel isolating on a network known for its prevailing negativity." Alexander also noted their immunity to much of the issues surrounding YouTube due to their targeting of a PG-13 audience and their desire to avoid drama. Their Sword AF series was positively received by Brittney Bender of Bleeding Cool, who praised the cast's humor, improvisational abilities and storytelling. The Honest Game Trailers series has had select episodes covered by various video game media outlets, including GameSpot, VG247, and Paste.

=== Awards and nominations ===
Smosh Games has won two Streamy Awards in the Gaming categories, one in 2014 and the other in 2017. They also won best Gaming channel in the 2016 Webby Awards.

As for nominations, in 2013, Smosh Games was nominated for a Streamy Award for Best Animated Series (for Oishi High School Battle, produced by the Smosh team). In 2015, they were nominated for another Streamy Award for Best Gaming Channel, Show, or Series. In 2016, they were nominated for a Streamy for Gaming and a Shorty Award for Best in Gaming. They won none of these.

== See also ==
- List of Smosh cast members
- List of YouTubers
