= List of Smosh cast members =

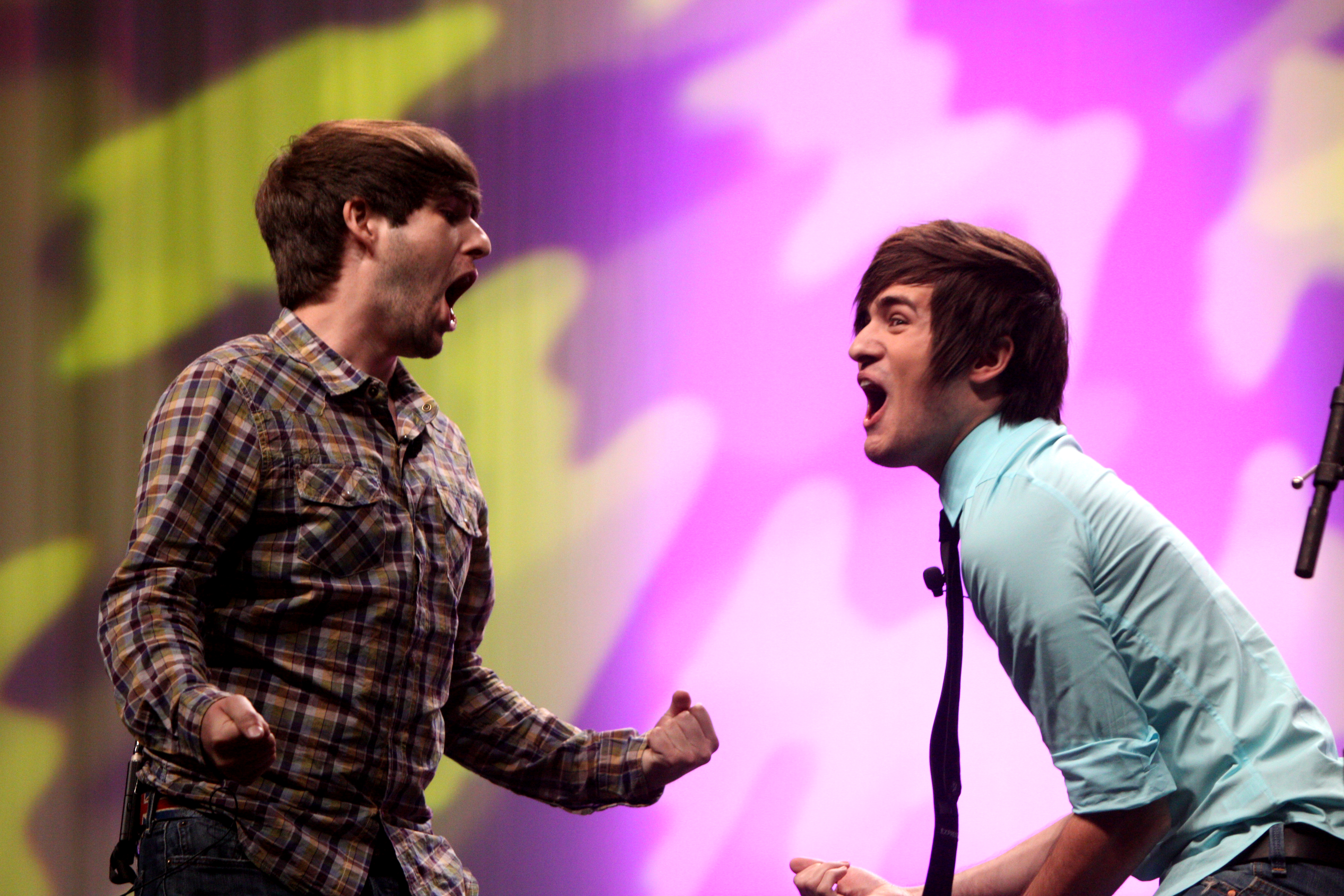
Smosh founders, Ian Hecox (left) and Anthony Padilla (right) in 2012.

Smosh is an American YouTube sketch comedy-improv collective founded by Anthony Padilla and Ian Hecox. Initially starting as a comedy duo of Hecox and Padilla, the channel began expanding to include additional cast members starting in 2010, with the majority of new cast members joining after Smosh was acquired by Alloy Digital (later rebranded to Defy Media) in 2011. Padilla left the channel in 2017 to pursue his independent channel, while Hecox remained with Smosh through the merge with Mythical Entertainment. In June 2023, it was announced that both Padilla and Hecox had bought Smosh from Mythical Entertainment, and the two founders would resume working together on Smosh as an independent entity.

== History ==
=== 2002–2011: Comedy duo ===
Smosh started as a website created by Anthony Padilla that he and his friends would use to upload Flash animations and talk to each other online. Eventually, he was joined by childhood friend Ian Hecox when the two started their YouTube channel. The videos started as lip syncing to theme songs for various movies and TV shows, such as Power Rangers, Mortal Kombat, Pokémon, and Teenage Mutant Ninja Turtles, but as their uploads became more popular, they eventually transitioned to sketch comedy. The majority of videos focused on the two in various comedic skits and music videos, but would also include occasional appearances from family and friends, such as Hecox's mother and longtime friend Brian Rassmussen.

=== 2011–2016: Expansion and Alloy Digital acquisition ===
In 2010, Smosh launched a new feature on their website called the "Smosh Pit", a blog that consisted of various pieces of pop-culture trivia, and written comedy. As part of this new feature, they also launched a new series on their second YouTube channel called "Smosh Pit Weekly" that summarized various articles posted on the website. Rather than hosting the series themselves, they recorded auditions for a host that were uploaded as a part of their "Ian is Bored" series, and let their fans vote on who they should pick. Eventually, the two hired Mari Takahashi as the show's host, making her the first addition to the Smosh cast.

Following Smosh's acquisition by Alloy Digital, the duo made plans to start Smosh Games; a new channel focused on video game news and let's play videos. To help run the channel, Alloy brought in three new cast members from the recently acquired Clevver Media; David "Lasercorn" Moss, Joshua "Jovenshire" Ovenshire, and Matt Sohinki. The channel launched on September 25, 2012, and continued to expand with additional members from 2014 to 2018, such as Amra "Flitz" Ricketts, Wes Johnson, Ericka "Boze" Bozeman, and Damien Haas.

As for their main channel, Padilla and Hecox began adding new cast members in 2015 with the addition of Keith Leak Jr., Olivia Sui, and Noah Grossman. The three were announced as main cast members at the end of the main channel video "APPLE WATCH SUCKS" on March 13, 2015. This group would eventually be followed by Courtney Miller and Shayne Topp later that year, which would complete the group that would be known as the "Smosh Squad." Much like the first group of new cast members, Miller and Topp were announced as joining the cast at the end of a main channel video on July 17, 2015. Hecox would later upload a video on the Smosh channel showing all the new cast members.

=== 2017–2018: Departures and Defy Media shutdown ===
Smosh began to see cast members leave the company consistently throughout 2017 and 2018. On June 14, 2017, Padilla announced that he would be leaving Smosh due to a lack of creative freedom. Shortly after, both Lasercorn and Sohinki announced that they would no longer be full-time members of Smosh Games due to similar reasons, but both stated that their decisions were not in response to Padilla's departure. In 2018, Flitz also left Smosh Games after being accused of sexual assault. Both Jovenshire and Takahashi left the company in 2018 as well, but continued to appear in videos as freelance employees, and made no announcements about their departures until much later on.

Later that year, Defy Media (formerly Alloy Digital) abruptly announced that they would be shutting down all operations and laying off their employees. During this time, both Johnson and Boze left, but the remaining cast stayed with the company while being independent.

=== 2019–2023: Mythical acquisition and continued expansion ===
On February 22, 2019, Smosh announced that they had been acquired by Rhett & Link as a part of Mythical Entertainment. Following this acquisition, both Lasercorn and Takahashi returned to run Smosh Games, but would leave again in 2020 to start a new channel with former Smosh members Sohinki, Jovenshire, Flitz, and Johnson. Smosh saw a massive expansion of on-screen talent during this time, which also included more consistent appearances by their crew. New main cast members in this time included Kimmy Jimenez, Jackie Uweh, Amanda Lehan-Canto, Chanse McCrary, Angela Giarratana, and Arasha Lalani.

=== 2023–present: Padilla's return and Smosh as an independent venture ===
In November 2022, Padilla and Hecox reconnected, and on June 20, 2023, the Smosh channel uploaded a video announcing that Padilla had returned to Smosh, and that they had purchased the channel and would be returning to their sketch comedy duo format. Despite Padilla's return, members of Smosh's team such as Topp, Miller, and Haas, would make recurring appearances on the channel. On August 23, 2023, Smosh announced on Twitter that Jackie Uweh had left the cast to join The Second City in New York, while Kimmy Jimenez would confirm in a video that she had left Smosh after having transitioned from being a cast member to a producer role at some point during 2023.

On January 1, 2024, Trevor Evarts of Mythical Entertainment announced on Twitter that he joined the Smosh cast. Later on that year, long-time crew member Tommy Bowe began to be referred to as a cast member in videos. Long-time crew member and Channel Director of Smosh Games, Spencer Agnew, was also referred to as a cast member during this time, however both were in videos before they were considered cast.

On October 6, 2026, Lalani announced she left Smosh following speculated rumors. Two days later, Eli Gonzalez, Emily Wirth, Tatyana "Guchi" Komaguchi and Courtney Theophin were officially named to the cast.

== Members ==
=== Current ===
Image	Performer	Time on Smosh	Main channel	Smosh Pit	Smosh Games
	Ian Hecox	2005–present	✓	✓	✓
	Anthony Padilla	2005–2017; 2023–present	✓	✓	✓
	Keith Leak Jr.	2014–present	✓	✓	✓
	Noah Grossman	2015–present	✓	✓	✓
	Courtney Miller	2015–present	✓	✓	✓
	Olivia Sui	2015–present	✓	✓	✓
	Shayne Topp	2015–present	✓	✓	✓
	Damien Haas	2017–present	✓	✓	✓
	Amanda Lehan-Canto	2020–present	✓	✓	✓
	Angela Giarratana	2022–present	✓	✓	✓
	Chanse McCrary	2022–present	✓	✓	✓
	Spencer Agnew	2024–present	✓	✓	✓
	Tommy Bowe	2024–present	✓	✓	✓
	Trevor Evarts	2024–present	✓	✓	✓
	Eli Gonzalez	2026–present	✓	✓	✓
	Tatyana "Guchi" Komaguchi	2026–present	✓	✓	✓
	Courtney Theophin	2026–present	✓	✓	✓
	Emily Wirth	2026–present	✓	✓	✓

=== Former ===
Image	Performer	Time on Smosh	Main channel	Smosh Pit	Smosh Games
	Mariko "Mari" Takahashi	2011–2018; 2019–2020	✓	✓	✓
	Joshua "Jovenshire" Ovenshire	2012–2018		✓	✓
	David "Lasercorn" Moss	2012–2017; 2019–2020		✓	✓
	Matthew Sohinki	2012–2017		✓	✓
	Wesley "Wes" Johnson	2013–2018		✓	✓
	Amra "Flitz" Ricketts	2013–2018		✓	✓
	Ericka "Boze" Bozeman	2017–2019	✓	✓	✓
	Kimmy Jimenez	2018–2024	✓	✓	✓
	Jacklyn "Jackie" Uweh	2019–2023	✓	✓	✓
	Ify Nwadiwe	2020–2022	✓	✓	✓
	Saige Ryan	2020–2022	✓	✓	✓
	Arasha Lalani	2022–2026	✓	✓	✓
