= Mari Takahashi =

American YouTuber

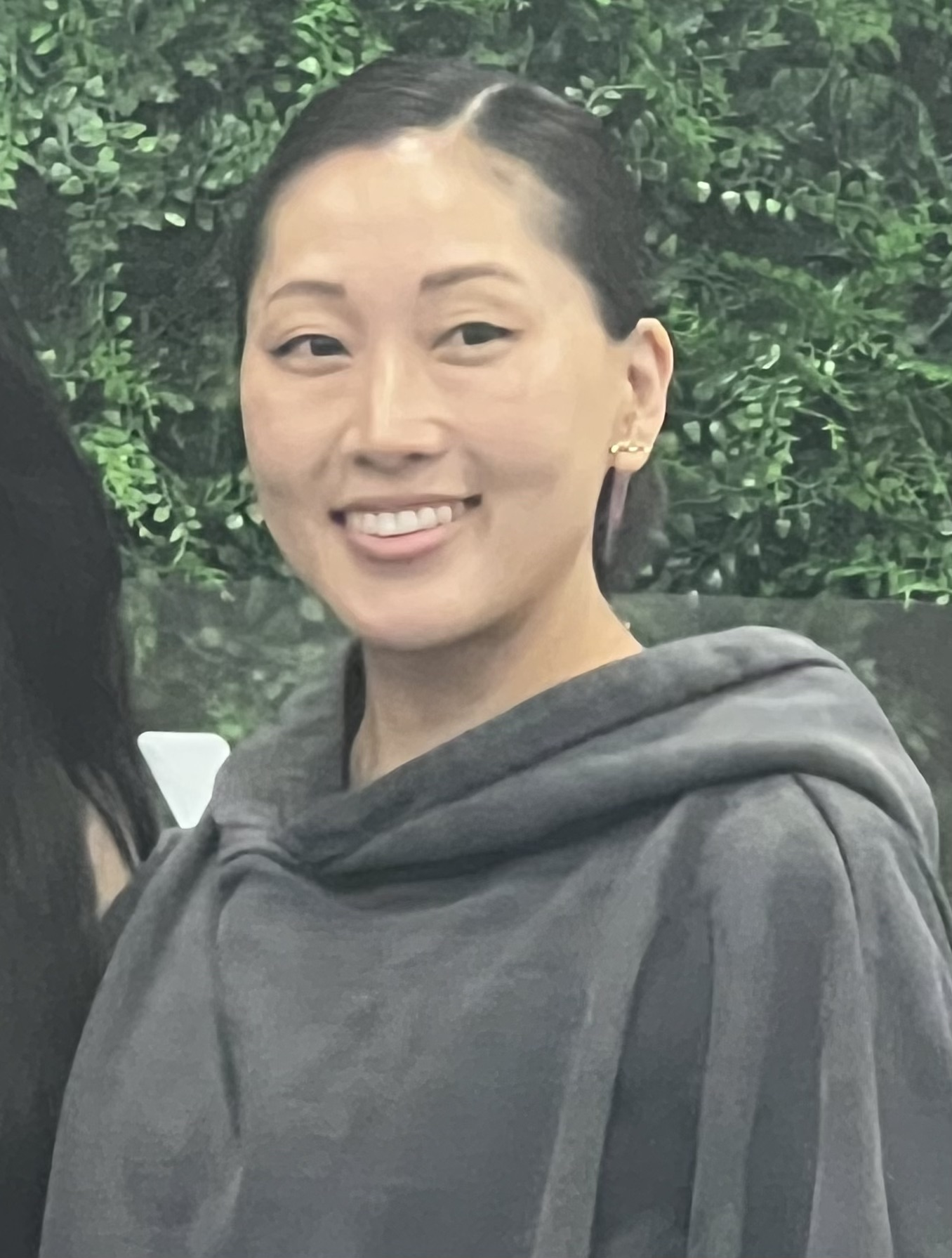
- Takahashi in 2026
- Born: Mariko Takahashi; November 2, 1984 (age 42); San Francisco, California, U.S.
- Occupation: YouTuber
- Television: Survivor: Millennials vs. Gen X
- Spouse: Peter Kitch (m. 2018)

YouTube information
- Channel: AtomicMari
- Years active: 2011–present
- Genre: Gaming
- Subscribers: 292 thousand
- Views: 9 million
- Last updated: October 29, 2026
- Website: www.atomicmari.com

Mariko "Mari" Takahashi, also known as AtomicMari, is an American YouTuber and internet personality. She was a cast member of the YouTube comedy channel Smosh, hosting the Smosh Pit Weekly series on their second channel and becoming an original member of the Smosh Games channel. She departed from Smosh in 2020 and became a co-owner of Spacestation Gaming in 2021. She also appeared as a contestant on the reality game show Survivor: Millennials vs. Gen X in 2016.

== Life and career ==
Mariko Takahashi was born and raised in San Francisco, California and is Japanese-American. Her father was an engineer and her mother was a ballerina, with the latter's occupation influencing Takahashi to pursue dancing and ballet in her adolescence. Takahashi also played video games as a child, such as Mortal Kombat and Street Fighter. She worked as a professional ballerina for ten years while working various jobs on the side.

In 2010, Takahashi applied for a job with the YouTube comedy channel Smosh, formed by Ian Hecox and Anthony Padilla. At the time, the channel had sought expansion of their content and were seeking a Japanese speaker. She first became a host for their Smosh Pit Weekly series on their secondary channel, which detailed content from their Smosh Pit blog hosted on their individual website. Takahashi initially dealt with negative comments according to Smosh's then-boss Barry Blumberg, with Hecox and Padilla telling her to ignore them. The series initially lasted from 2011 to 2015 for over 200 episodes, before being revived in 2017 with Takahashi hosting once more.

Takahashi joined Smosh Games – a collaborative venture between Smosh and members of ClevverGames – in 2012. She hosted various series on the channel, including MariCraft, a Let's Play series where she played Minecraft with members of the Smosh Games crew. She also partook in an Assassin's Creed Origins-based mini-series with member Joshua Ovenshire in 2017. Takahashi has been noted for her transition from working as a ballerina in a female-dominated industry to gaming as a male-dominated industry. She was the first female member of Smosh Games, until Ericka "Boze" Bozeman joined in 2017. With Smosh Games, she won two Streamy Awards, and was listed among Forbes magazine's 2017 "Top Influencers" in Gaming.

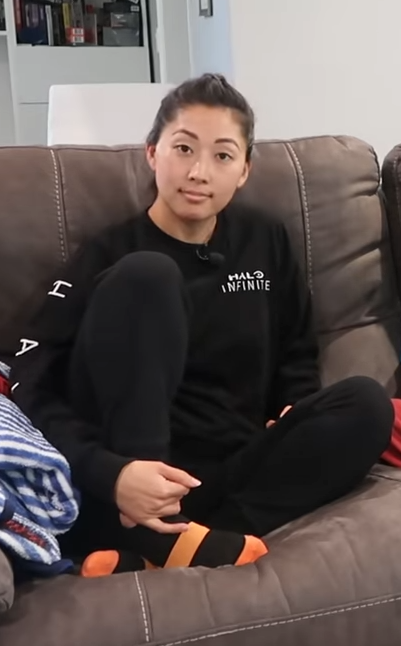
Takahashi in 2019

Outside of Smosh, Takahashi has pursued other ventures. In 2016, Takahashi was a contestant in the 33rd season of Survivor – Millennials vs. Gen X. In anticipation, she hosted MariCraft: Outsider as a Survivor-based version of the MariCraft series. Takahashi played for the Millennial tribe, but was the first contestant voted out of her team. After ten years, Takahashi departed from the Smosh brand in early 2020 to focus on her solo career. The same year, she ventured into hosting as a correspondent for gaming website Polygon's Speedrun news series. Takahashi became a co-owner of the esports organization Spacestation Gaming in 2021. She also worked with Lacoste for a Minecraft clothing collection in 2022, and in 2023, she hosted the FailArmy gaming web series 50 Vs. 50.

== Personal life ==
Mari has been in a relationship with photographer Peter Kitch since 2010. They met in January of that year at a rock climbing gym, where Mari had decided to officially take lessons after climbing Mount Kilimanjaro; Peter was her instructor. They became engaged in April 2017 and kept it a secret for many months. They got married in Japan on April 5th, 2018, in a traditional Japanese ceremony.

== Filmography ==
Year	Work	Role	Note(s)	Ref(s)
2016	MatPat's Game Lab	Guest	YouTube Original series	
2016	Survivor: Millennials vs. Gen X	Herself	Contestant (19th Place)	
2016	Smosh Live!	Choreographer	Livestream	
2017	Home & Family	Guest		
2019	Retro Tech	Guest	YouTube Original series	
2021	Could You Survive the Movies?	Guest	YouTube Original series	
2025	Death Battle	Vampire Queen	Episode: "Blade VS Buffy"	

== Awards and nominations ==
Awards and nominations received by Mari Takahashi
Award	Year	Category	Result	Ref.
Forbes	2017	Top Influencers: Gaming	Won	
Streamy Awards	2014	Gaming	Won (shared with Smosh Games)	
Streamy Awards	2017	Gaming	Won (shared with Smosh Games)	

== See also ==
- List of Smosh cast members
- List of Survivor contestants
