= Zvue =

Portable media player

Zvue was a brand of portable media player devices made by a company named HandHeld Entertainment.

== History ==
They released in the mid-2000s and were aimed at teenagers, with prices around $99. Zvue used to be listed on NASDAQ but was removed due to heavy losses in 2008.

== Specifications ==
The media player supported MP3 files, JPG images, and videos under its own file format named HHe. These videos had to purchased from the company's now defunct store website, which was similar to iTunes. Zvue media players often had a lower price point than their competitors, at $99. Some models came with no built-in memory, instead requiring an SD card. Zvue also released MP3 players with built in storage and songs.
