= Shayne Topp =

American YouTuber, improv actor and comedian (born 1991)

- Topp in 2009
- Born: Shayne Robert Topp; September 14, 1991 (age 35); Tampa, Florida, U.S.
- Education: Arizona State University (BA)
- Occupations: YouTuber; comedian; actor; podcaster; host
- Years active: 2006–present
- Employer: Smosh
- Known for: Dear Lemon Lima; iCarly; Smosh; So Random!; The Goldbergs
- Spouse: Courtney Miller (m. 2024)
- Topp's voice From an interview at the L.A. Film Festival in 2009

Shayne Robert Topp (born September 14, 1991) is an American YouTuber, comedian, actor, podcaster, and host. He is most known for starring in Dear Lemon Lima and his work on the YouTube sketch-comedy collective Smosh, of which he has been a cast member since 2015 and the co-host of its podcast Smosh Mouth (2023–present). He is also known for his roles as Shayne Zabo on the Disney Channel series So Random! (2011–2012), and as Matt Bradley in seasons 4–10 on the ABC series The Goldbergs (2017–2023).

== Early life ==
Topp was born on September 14, 1991, in Tampa, Florida, to Catherine Topp (née Person) and Robert Royal Topp, a fighter pilot. He grew up in Phoenix, Arizona, but moved to Los Angeles, California when he was a teenager, where he attended a high school for young actors to be able to continue acting while going to school.

At 18 months old, Topp was alone in a baby playpen at his family home in Florida when he managed to escape and get outside. While throwing rocks into the pool, he fell in and drowned. Topp was legally dead for an unknown amount of time before his mother came outside, and paramedics were called.

== Career ==
Topp got his acting debut with a leading role in the 2006 film Moonpie and later had a guest role in the Nickelodeon series iCarly. He went on to win the Jury Prize at the 2009 Los Angeles Film Festival for his performance in Dear Lemon Lima. In 2012, Topp appeared in the Disney Channel show So Random! alongside fellow future Smosh member Damien Haas.

Topp played recurring character Matt Bradley on ABC's The Goldbergs in seasons 4–10 from 2017–2023, and reprised his role in a cameo in the spin off series Schooled.

Topp also has experience in theater performances, starring in The Best Christmas Pageant Ever at Wonderworks Theatre Company and Willy Wonka and the Chocolate Factory at Highland Lakes Theatre (in the title role). Additionally, he has appeared in commercials.

=== Smosh ===
His first ever appearance with the Smosh ensemble was during the video "THE SUMMER GAMES ARE HERE! (Smosh Summer Games)," where he appeared as a referee. On July 17, 2015, during a main channel video titled "HAND BOMB," he was announced as a new cast member alongside Courtney Miller. Since joining, he has become a mainstay of the "Smosh Squad" and has expanded his role to include hosting various shows and podcasts, such as Smosh Mouth and Smosh Reads Reddit Stories.

== Personal life ==
Topp holds a degree in psychology from Arizona State University, which he completed in 2019 after ten years of intermittent online studies.

On March 29, 2024, Topp married fellow Smosh cast member Courtney Miller at the Santa Barbara County Courthouse. They intentionally chose to announce their marriage on April Fools' Day, as they kept their romantic relationship private for years.

== Filmography ==
=== Film ===
Year	Film	Role	Notes	Ref.
2006	Moonpie	John Paul		
2009	Dear Lemon Lima	Philip Georgey		
2011	All Kids Count	Corey		
2012	Hi, Lillian	Dylan	Short film	
2013	The Violation	Oscar Heim	Short film	
2013	First	Rick	Short film	
2015	A Sort of Homecoming	Dylan Conti		
2016	Ghostmates	Adult film actor	Uncredited cameo	
2021	Terrordactyl: Extinction USA	College Student	Short film	
2023	Howdy, Neighbor!	Officer Crowley		

=== Anime ===
Year	Series	Role	Notes	Ref.
2026	Sparks of Tomorrow	Ukon		

=== Television ===
Year	Series	Role	Notes	Ref.
2008	iCarly	Philip Brownley	Episode: "iMight Switch Schools"	
2010	Eli Stone	Young Nathan Stone	Pilot	
2011	Love Bites	Ian	Episode: "Too Much Information"	
2012	Fred: The Show	Steve	Episode: "Expired Cow"	
2012	So Random!	Shayne Zabo	Recurring role	
2014	Sam & Cat	Vance Anderson	Episode: "#StuckInABox"	
2015	Switched at Birth	Taylor Halsted	Episode: "I Lock the Door Upon Myself"	
2015	Henry Danger	Dennis	Episode: "Captain Jerk"	
2015	Astrid Clover	Cop with Taser	Episode: "Photo Fads"	
2017–2023	The Goldbergs	Matt Bradley	Recurring role	
2019	Schooled	Matt Bradley	Episode: "Dr. Barry"	

=== Web ===
Year	Series	Role	Notes	Ref.
2013	What's Next for Sarah?	Chad	Episode 2	
2015–present	Smosh	Himself	Main cast member	
2015–2016	The Warp Zone	News Anchor, Captain America	Episodes: "A Very Warped Christmas 5" "Captain America: Civil War - The Avengers Pick Teams"	
2017	YouTube Rewind	Himself	Episode: "The Shape of 2017"	
2018	The Chaos Wolves	Himself	Episode: "The Problem with Smosh"	
2018	No, That's Okay. I'm Good.	Himself	Episode: "Damien Haas, Shayne Topp & Matthew Scott Montgomery"	
2019	Alternative Lifestyle	Himself	Episode: "Smosh is Moving In"	
2024	Dirty Laundry	Himself	Episode: "Who Wrote a Short Story That Seriously Disturbed a Teacher?"	
2025	Smartypants	Himself	3 Episodes	

=== Podcasts ===
Year	Title	Role	Notes	Ref.
2018–2021	The Valleycast	Himself	Episodes: "I died in a pool when I was a baby w/ Shayne Topp from SMOSH" "Shayne Topp Reveals His Secrets To Us!"	
2019–2021	SmoshCast	Co-Host	Main cast member	
2019	Podcast But Outside	Himself	Episode: "A Thanksgiving Eve Celebration With Shayne Topp"	
2021	Crazy Stupid Fangirls	Himself	Episode: "The So Random Cast on How Disney Treats Their Stars Behind Closed Doors"	
2021–2025	Syd & Olivia Talk Shit	Himself	Episodes: "Surprise, We're Drunk (feat. Shayne Topp)" "Shayne Topp's Bachelorette Party"	
2022	The Axis Effect	Himself	Episodes: "Funny Is As Funny Does! Smosh Comedy Series" "Smosh Comedy Series: Finding Humor in Life, Every Day is Funny With Smosh!"	
2022	Artists on Artists on Artists on Artists	Himself	Episode: "Animatronics (w/ Shayne Topp)"	
2022	Trevor Talks Too Much	Himself	Episode: "Live at Mythicon ft. Shayne and Courtney from Smosh"	
2022–present	Smosh Reads Reddit Stories	Host	All Episodes	
2023–present	Smosh Mouth	Host	All episodes except: "The Tell All Episode" "Shayne's Gone, Let's Party" "Introducing Your New Hosts" "Our Wildest Takes"	
2024	Two Hot Takes	Himself	Episode: "Suffer with Us.. Ft. Shayne Topp from Smosh"	
2024	Perfect Person	Himself	Episode: "catfishing my landlord's widow (w/ Shayne Topp & Amanda Lehan-Canto)"	
2024	Chuckle Sandwich	Himself	Episode: "Shayne Topp & Courtney Miller"	
2024	Chuckle Sandwich	Anthony Padilla	Episode: "Ian Hecox & Anthony Padilla of Smosh"	

== Awards and nominations ==
Year	Nominee / work	Award	Result
2009	Dear Lemon Lima	Los Angeles Film Festival (Jury Prize) – Outstanding Performance	Won
2010	Dear Lemon Lima	Method Fest – Best Ensemble Cast	Won
2014	Dear Lemon Lima	Young Hollywood Awards – New Exciting Face (Male)	Nominated
