= Sulphur High School (Oklahoma) =

Location
- 700 West Broadway Avenue; Sulphur, Oklahoma 73086; United States; 34°30′25″N 96°58′38″W

Information
- School type: Public, high school
- School district: Sulphur Public Schools
- Superintendent: Matt Holder
- Principal: Clete Cole
- Teaching staff: 13.00 (FTE)
- Grades: 9–12
- Enrollment: 445 (2023–2024)
- Student to teacher ratio: 34.23
- Colors: Red and white
- Mascot: Mack
- Team name: Bulldogs
- Rival: Davis High School
- Website: www.sulphurk12.org/79384_2

Sulphur High School is a public high school located in Sulphur, Oklahoma.

== Academics ==
In 2020, 97.7% of the school's seniors received their high school diploma, and 34.6% dropped out. The average GPA of the school's seniors was 1.9.

== Proficiency testing ==
In Reading, 105 students took the reading proficiency test. 2% of the students who were tested in reading were Unsatisfactory, 23% Limited Knowledge, 56% Proficient, and 19% Advanced. In Mathematics, 101 students took the math proficiency test. 4% of the students who were tested in mathematics were Unsatisfactory, 35% Limited Knowledge, 33% Proficient, and 29% Advanced. Reading and Math proficiency is determined by student results on the school's Oklahoma Core Curriculum Tests, End of Instruction Secondary Tests.
