= List of Hollywood Arts characters =

This is a list of the characters from the 2026 Netflix sitcom Hollywood Arts. The series centers around Trina Vega (Daniella Monet) an unqualified substitute teacher for Hollywood Arts High School teaching the new generation of students. The show was created by former Victorious producer Jake Farrow.

== Main characters ==
=== Trina Vega ===
Trina Vega (portrayed by Daniella Monet) is the main character of the series. Trina is the older sister of Tori Vega, who is now a famous pop star. Trina returns to Hollywood Arts as a struggling actress. After Sikowitz announces his retirement, she fills in as an unqualified substitute teacher and is subsequently hired permanently by Principal Helen. After Trina gets the full time role of the theater teacher at Hollywood Arts, her students like her ways of teaching. Trina hears about the big showcase in the beginning bringing her back to her days when she was a student attending Hollywood Arts. She wants to take the opportunity but hears her very talented student Emmy Ward sing giving the spotlight to her.

=== Emmy Ward ===
Emmy Ward (portrayed by Alyssa Miles), often referred to as "Techy", is the shy younger sister of Oscar Ward. She attends Hollywood Arts at the urging of their parents despite insisting she has no skills or interest in performing arts, though she is very gifted at technology and programming. After Trina hears her sing, the latter encourages her to take over her spot at the big showcase, which helps Emmy embrace her talent for performing and become more confident. She is Tori Vega's counterpart.

=== Qwest ===
Qwest (portrayed by Peyton Jackson) is a talented musician and Oscar's best friend. Because his parents disapprove of performing arts and instead hope for Qwest to become an athlete, Qwest has led them to believe that he is a member of Hollywood Arts' nonexistent basketball team. He is Andre Harris' counterpart.

=== Oscar Ward ===
Oscar Ward (portrayed by Martin Kamm) is Emmy Ward's older brother. Oscar is a talented, popular, and vain student whom often overshadows his younger sister Emmy, albeit sometimes unintentionally. Due to his talents and handsome looks, the female students at Hollywood Arts often fight over him. He is the president of his very own fan club and works at Boba Baby. He is Beck Oliver's counterpart.

=== Pepper ===
Pepper (portrayed by Emmy Liu-Wang) is a bubbly, ditzy student who grew up in a musical family and is Emmy's best friend. Pepper is frenemies with Jen Z and often competes with her for Oscar's attention. She is Cat Valentine's counterpart.

=== Jen Z ===
Jen Z (portrayed by Erika Swayze) is an aggressive, sarcastic student at Hollywood Arts with a crush on Oscar, over whom she often fights with Pepper. She is Jade West's counterpart.

== Recurring ==
=== Principal Helen Dubois ===
Helen Dubois (portrayed by Yvette Nicole Brown) is the principal at Hollywood Arts. Formerly the manager at The Premiere Theater in Drake & Josh. Helen gives Trina her job after Sikowitz announces his retirement.

== Guest ==
=== Mr. Erwin Sikowitz ===
Erwin Sikowitz (portrayed by Eric Lange) is the quirky, hippie & eccentric teacher from Hollywood Arts. Sikowitz is leaving Hollywood Arts to be with his family and gives his spot to Trina Vega.

=== Robbie "Mr. S." Shapiro ===
Robbie Shapiro (portrayed by Matt Bennett) is a skilled ventriloquist and owner of Rex Powers, his puppet. He is now formally a part time songwriting teacher at Hollywood Arts and is called Mr. S. by his students.

=== Rex Powers ===
Rex Powers (voiced by Jake Farrow) is Robbie's puppet and alter ego.
