= List of Raven's Home episodes =

Raven's Home is an American family sitcom television series developed by Jed Elinoff and Scott Thomas that aired on Disney Channel from July 21, 2017 to September 3, 2023. The series stars Raven-Symoné, Issac Ryan Brown, Navia Robinson, Jason Maybaum, Sky Katz, Anneliese van der Pol, Mykal-Michelle Harris, Felix Avitia, Emmy Liu-Wang, and Rondell Sheridan.

Based on the characters created by Michael Poryes and Susan Sherman, the series is a spinoff of That's So Raven, the second spinoff from that series after Cory in the House. The series centers around Raven Baxter, a divorced mother of preteen twins Booker and Nia, living with her childhood best friend Chelsea and her son Levi in Chicago, Illinois. The fifth season has Raven and Booker relocating to San Francisco after Raven's father Victor had a mild heart attack.

== Series overview ==
Season	Episodes	Originally released	
Season	Episodes	First released	Last released
1	13	July 21, 2017	October 20, 2017
2	21	June 25, 2018	November 30, 2018
3	26	June 17, 2019	May 3, 2020
4	19	July 24, 2020	May 21, 2021
5	25	March 11, 2022	December 2, 2022
6	18	April 9, 2023	September 3, 2023

== Episodes ==
=== Season 1 (2017) ===
No. overall	No. in season	Title	Directed by	Written by	Original release date	Prod. code	U.S. viewers (millions)
1	1	"Baxter's Back!"	Eric Dean Seaton	Jed Elinoff & Scott Thomas	July 21, 2017	101	3.50
Now living in Chicago, Raven and Chelsea have moved in together with their children after their divorces. Raven has twins named Booker and Nia and Chelsea has a son named Levi. Raven has a vision of Nia complaining about Booker getting more attention from their mother than her, so Raven sets out to spend more time with Nia, which quickly becomes annoying for the latter. Meanwhile, Booker has his first vision at school and tells Levi and their friend Tess. He tries telling Nia as well, but she doesn't believe him, as he is known to make up stories. Eventually, she comes around to believe him after one of his visions comes true. Booker then decides not to tell Raven about his visions, convinced she will not believe him. Coincidentally, Raven has also not told her children about her visions. Guest star: Leslie David Baker as Principal Wentworth
2	2	"Big Trouble in Little Apartment"	Eric Dean Seaton	Jed Elinoff & Scott Thomas	July 28, 2017	103	1.66
Since Levi and Chelsea moved in, Nia has been sleeping on the couch, which makes her feel she lacks privacy and space for herself. When Raven tells Nia that she loves having Levi and Chelsea at the house, she begins to feel guilty and decides not to talk with Raven about her issues. Nia later turns to her father Devon for help, only for him to reveal that he is moving to Texas for a job. While Nia is unsure if she should go with him, Raven, who overheard their conversation, decides to tell her daughter how much she loves her, which helps to convince her to stay. Later, Chelsea allows Nia to move into her room, which she has redecorated, to give her the privacy she needs, while she moves into Raven's room. Meanwhile, Booker tries to make Levi feel more at home and buys a trampoline after hearing about Levi's old room; however, he must keep it hidden from Raven. Guest star: Jonathan McDaniel as Devon Carter
3	3	"The Baxters Get Bounced"	Eric Dean Seaton	Meg DeLoatch	August 4, 2017	102	1.20
After both Booker and Chelsea break something in the house, Raven demands that no one call Mr. Jablonski, the landlord, since she has not told him that Levi and Chelsea are living with her. However, when Booker and Nia get frustrated cleaning the dishes, they call Mr. Jablonski to fix the dishwasher against their mother's wishes. When Mr. Jablonski finds out about Levi and Chelsea, he raises the rent and threatens to kick the family out if they do not comply. Meanwhile, Booker and Nia hold a yard sale to help their mother and Levi make friends with their neighbor, who turns out to be the apartment's proprietor and Mr. Jablonski's mother. In the end, she persuades her son to keep the rent as it is, allowing Chelsea and Levi to live with Raven's family. Guest stars: Skyler Day as Paisley, Bruno Amato as Mr. Jablonski, Peggy Miley as Ma Jablonski
4	4	"The Bearer of Dad News"	Victor Gonzalez	Jim Martin	August 11, 2017	104	1.35
Raven, Booker, and Nia plan a surprise goodbye party for Devon before he moves to Texas. However, when Raven has a vision of her children being upset about Devon's departure, she plans a weekend of activities their father would do with them. Not all things go as planned when Raven finds the activities to be too extreme for her to handle. Meanwhile, Chelsea accidentally destroys Booker and Nia's stuffed bear gifted to them by Devon, so she and Levi set out to try and fix it. Guest stars: Jonathan McDaniel as Devon Carter, Jordan Black as Carnie Absent: Sky Katz as Tess
5	5	"You're Gonna Get It"	Victor Gonzalez	Anthony C. Hill	August 18, 2017	105	1.44
Raven catches Nia wearing makeup and makes her take it off, saying that she is too young. The next morning, Nia steals Raven's makeup and wears it to school. She quickly gains popularity and accidentally hosts a party on the apartment's rooftop, but has pricks of conscience. Meanwhile, Booker tries to help Levi when he does not want to go to school, as he does not enjoy dodgeball. He sneaks into Levi's class in order to help him out during the match, but he gets obsessed with winning the game. At the same, Raven reveals to Chelsea that she lied to her boss, Paisley, about having two dogs which she named after her children, in order to get the job. When Paisley decides to visit Raven to see the dogs, she and Chelsea must find a way to cover the truth. Guest stars: Skyler Day as Paisley, Lexi Underwood as Shannon, Anthony Alabi as Coach Spitz
6	6	"Adventures in Mommy-Sitting"	Shannon Flynn	Jim Martin	August 25, 2017	107	1.25
Raven and Chelsea decide to go out to a club called The Vault. However, when they are unable to find a babysitter for the night, they decide to trust their children and Tess to stay home alone. While they are out, the children spill drinks on a chair and attempt to fix it. Booker later has a vision of Raven and Chelsea getting locked into the vault of the club, so he and the others go out to try to save them, but have trouble sneaking into the club. Meanwhile, Raven and Chelsea run into problems with a partygoer. In the end, the children manage to avoid getting into trouble and Booker is happy that his mother will trust him to be in charge again, until she finds out about the chair on the way back home. Guest stars: Reginald Ballard as Bouncer, Nina Millin as Brenda
7	7	"Dancing Tween"	Shannon Flynn	Sassi Darling	September 8, 2017	108	1.37
The children's school is holding a dance with Booker and Tess helping to organize it. However, when they make it seem that the dance circle is important, Nia begins to feel pressured to learn how to dance. Meanwhile, Booker has a vision that the party will be a disaster; when he and Tess clash on the dance's theme and ruin the whole ball, it is up to Chelsea to solve everything. At the same time, Raven feels insecure about her involvement in Booker and Nia's lives when the school principal makes a comment about Chelsea always helping out, and decides to bake muffins for the school dance, with disastrous results. Guest star: Leslie David Baker as Principal Wentworth
8	8	"Vending the Rules"	Bob Koherr	Molly Haldeman & Camilla Rubis	September 15, 2017	109	1.48
When the snack vending machine at school is out of order, the children decide to sell snacks at school in order to purchase the items they want. However, the school gym teacher, Coach Spitz, finds out about the scheme and attempts to find the culprits. Meanwhile, Raven tries to help Chelsea when she keeps defending ex-husband, who is in prison, as Levi is unaware of what type of man he was, and uses some of his previous advice to help the other children in their plot. Guest star: Anthony Alabi as Coach Spitz
9	9	"In-vision of Privacy"	Bob Koherr	Danielle Calvert	September 22, 2017	111	1.26
Booker has a vision of Tess playing basketball with a boy named Jordan, whom she likes, followed by a vision of Jordan rejecting Tess when she reveals her feelings to him. After Tess refuses to listen to his warnings, demanding that he stay out of her personal life, Booker and Levi try to stall Jordan from meeting Tess in order to prevent him from hurting Tess' feelings. Meanwhile, Raven and Chelsea argue about their parenting styles, and find themselves unintentionally becoming volunteers at an old foster care. Guest stars: Philip Solomon as Jordan, Cleo Berry as Lawrence Absent: Navia Robinson as Nia Baxter-Carter
10	10	"Fears of a Clown"	Victor Gonzalez	Rick Williams	September 29, 2017	106	1.21
Booker and Levi befriend a boy named Wally and start hanging out with him. After Nia and Tess meet Wally and develop a crush on him, they begin fighting with the boys to spend more time with him. Meanwhile, Raven sees a clown in her building and starts to work to face her fears. After she finds out that the clown is Wally's mother and hurts her feelings, she must look for a way to apologize to her. Guest stars: Tristan DeVan as Wally, Valerie Azlynn as Diane
11	11	"The Baxtercism of Levi Grayson"	Bob Koherr	Charity L. Miller & Eric Owusu	October 6, 2017	110	1.28
On Halloween, Booker and Levi plan to prank their friend Travis using the legend of a ghost in their apartment building. However, after Levi mysteriously disappears, Booker and Travis believe that the ghost is real and has kidnapped Levi, so they begin searching for him with Raven's help. Meanwhile, Nia comes down with a case of chickenpox and Tess helps her celebrate Halloween. Guest star: Nicolas Cantu as Travis
12	12	"Dream Moms"	Robbie Countryman	Jed Elinoff & Scott Thomas	October 13, 2017	113	1.18
After Raven and Chelsea make a comment that Booker and Levi don't show enough appreciation for what they are doing for them, the boys get them tickets to a concert of their favorite band. However, after Booker has a vision of the concert getting cancelled, he and Levi go to prevent this from happenning, only to get in trouble backstage and accidentally knock out one of the band members. With Raven and Chelsea's help, the boys must find a way to fix everything, or else the concert will be cancelled. Meanwhile, Nia wonders why she has not inherited visions like Booker has. Guest stars: Izzy Diaz as Mr. Alvarez, Kimrie Lewis-Davis as La
13	13	"Vest in Show"	Robbie Countryman	Rick Williams	October 20, 2017	112	1.27
Raven and Booker have a shared vision while hugging each other, of Paisley firing Raven at Doggy Fashion Week. To help his mother, Booker paints some models for the dogs' clothes, which Paisley enjoys more than Raven's designs. To avoid being fired, Raven takes Booker with her at Doggy Fashion Week to help with the paintings, but things get complicated when she must do a painting in front of the live audience. Meanwhile, Levi, Tess, and Chelsea decide to sell pizza to help pay the bills, but end up turning the living room into a popular restaurant. Guest star: Skyler Day as Paisley Absent: Navia Robinson as Nia Baxter-Carter

=== Season 2 (2018) ===
No. overall	No. in season	Title	Directed by	Written by	Original release date	Prod. code	U.S. viewers (millions)
14	1	"The Falcon and the Raven – Part One"	Robbie Countryman	Michael Feldman & Dava Savel	June 25, 2018	201	0.96
Raven and the children are ecstatic after the former has sold a jacket for $10,000 in the previous episode, but Booker soon has a vision that she will lose it, so he, Nia and Levi sneak out to steal Raven's backpack with the money in it. Meanwhile, Raven's new job as a Scüt driver has her dealing with a client owning a falcon named Ernesto, who Raven becomes convinced stole her backpack. After Chelsea beats Tess in a basketball competition, Tess is forced to help Chelsea garden, but accidentally throws the backpack, that the children buried, over the roof. The children rush to retrieve it, and Levi falls into cement as Raven returns home. After joining Chelsea and Tess on the roof, Booker is forced to reveal his visions to Raven. Chelsea persuades Raven to do so as well, but Raven is too nervous. Guest star: Alec Mapa as Norman
15	2	"The Falcon and the Raven – Part Two"	Robbie Countryman	Dava Savel & Michael Feldman	June 26, 2018	202	1.02
Raven confesses her psychic abilities to Booker, Nia and Levi, forming the "Psychic Duo" with Booker in the hope of finding where her money has gone. Nia, feeling left out, fakes a vision herself to be more involved with her brother and mother, while Levi becomes a self-confessed superhero due to his incident with concrete cement. Guest star: Gabby Sanalitro as Gloria
16	3	"Because"	Lynn McCracken	Norm Gunzenhauser	June 27, 2018	203	0.98
Booker wants to reveal he is psychic to his fellow school students to be more popular on social media, but Raven warns him against this with the simple reason: Because. Going against his mother's words, Booker lets the secret out and it quickly escalates. Meanwhile, Raven is looking for more stars at her new job as a Scüt driver, so Chelsea opts to help her. Guest stars: Anthony Alabi as Coach Spitz, Jenna Davis as Sienna, Kaiden Chapman as Jared
17	4	"Cop to It"	Eric Dean Seaton	Paul Ciancarelli & David DiPietro	June 28, 2018	204	1.00
The family's apartment building gets a new owner named Richard, who has Mitch, his ten-year-old son, run the building while he is busy. Mitch makes it his mission to have the family suffer after he suspects they are intentionally insulting him, going so far as to forbid anyone from doing their laundry and not bringing the building up to code. Meanwhile, Raven and Booker have visions of Nia in trouble and suspect Tess is behind it. Guest stars: Dylan Martin Frankel as Mitch, Matt Corboy as Richard, Jonathan Chase as Officer Kowalski
18	5	"Weirder Things"	Eric Dean Seaton	Antonia March & Jacqueline McKinley	July 3, 2018	205	0.90
The children have tickets to the premiere of Weirder Things, a reference to Netflix's Stranger Things, but when Tess's mom can no longer take them, they look to Raven and Chelsea for help. However, Chelsea is suffering from a terrible cold, making her delirious, and Raven is having her weave redone. Meanwhile, Mitch attempts to be nice after discovering the children also love Weirder Things. Guest stars: Dylan Martin Frankel as Mitch, Wendy Raquel Robinson as Dreamweaver, Somali Rose as Power
19	6	"The Missteps"	Lynn McCracken	Douglas Danger Lieblein	July 6, 2018	206	0.92
The school's step dance team is looking for new members and both Nia and Tess are interested in joining, but when it is revealed that there is only a spot for one of them, rivalry blossoms between the girls. Later, Chelsea reveals that Raven also used to participate in step dance when she was in college, but she was cursed by a fly to lose. Meanwhile, Booker and Levi get an alarm clock, but the light keeps Levi awake, so he entertains himself by recording Booker having sleep visions. Guest stars: Laya DeLeon Hayes as Zeena, Jordan Julian as Taylor
20	7	"All Sewn Up"	Leonard R. Garner Jr.	Gigi McCreery & Perry Rein	July 10, 2018	207	0.75
Raven wants Booker and Nia to invest their savings in bank accounts, but when they both end up spending their money on trivial items, they attempt to get their money back before Raven finds out. Meanwhile, Mitch attempts to befriend Booker and Levi again, but goes about it the wrong way. Later, Chelsea continues her new hobby of gardening by growing mini-cacti while Raven makes a significant amount of money painting for one of her Scüt client's pets. Guest stars: Dylan Martin Frankel as Mitch, Jenna Davis as Sienna, Laya DeLeon Hayes as Zeena, Gabby Sanalitro as Gloria
21	8	"Oh Father, Where Art Thou?"	Leonard R. Garner Jr.	Dava Savel	July 13, 2018	208	0.80
Nia is excited to spend time with her father at the annual father-daughter dance at school, but when Devon gets stuck at the airport due to a snowstorm, Raven steps in to try to get him to the dance in time and not disappoint Nia. Meanwhile, Chelsea's gardening habit takes a new turn when she makes a centerpiece for the dance. Later, Booker tries to get a photo with a professional basketball player, who is also attending the dance with his daughter. Guest stars: Jonathan McDaniel as Devon, Mike Massimino as Jimmy, Brianna Reed as Sheridan
22	9	"The Trouble with Levi"	Jody Margolin Hahn	Douglas Danger Lieblein	July 20, 2018	210	0.75
Levi gets moved up a grade in his science class, making him classmates with Booker, but when he reveals potentially embarrassing information on Booker due to their brotherly bond, a rivalry develops and things quickly escalate. Meanwhile, Raven and Chelsea are faced with the tough decision of decluttering their old clothes to save space in the apartment, and Nia elects herself to help them with this task. Guest stars: Travis Burnett as Tanner, Liz Jenkins as Ms. Pittman Absent: Sky Katz as Tess
23	10	"Head Over Wheels"	Trevor Kirschner	Anthony C. Hill	July 27, 2018	214	0.76
Levi likes a girl in school who happens to be in a wheelchair, but after inviting her for dinner, he finds out that she cannot attend due to their building not having an elevator. Later, Nia and Tess discover that there is an elevator and Mitch has been hiding it for his own personal use. Meanwhile, Raven has started a clothing business but has trouble dealing with opening an account for it. Guest stars: Dylan Martin Frankel as Mitch, Travis Burnett as Tanner / Turner, Eliza Pryor as Isabella Absent: Anneliese van der Pol as Chelsea Grayson
24	11	"The Most Interesting Mom in the World"	Trevor Kirschner	Douglas Danger Lieblein	July 31, 2018	215	0.74
Annoyed by his son’s attitude and wanting all the children to appreciate their parents more, the math teacher, Mr. Patel, has his students do a report on their parents’ professions. Booker has a vision of the students laughing, so he and Nia plan to make their report on Raven interesting – since they don't think that her work as a Scüt driver or fashion designer will please – using a new app on Levi’s phone, which goes very wrong. Guest stars: Laya DeLeon Hayes as Zeena, Ronobir Lahiri as Mr. Patel Absent: Anneliese van der Pol as Chelsea Grayson
25	12	"Sleevemore Part One: Frozen"	Jody Margolin Hahn	Jacqueline McKinley & Antonia March	September 21, 2018	211	0.82
During her rounds as a Scüt driver, Raven comes across an old friend, Dr. Sleevemore, who helped her with her visions as a teenager. The timing is useful as Booker’s visions start to freeze on him so Raven takes him to see the psychic doctor. Nia, meanwhile, takes a liking to one of Sleevemore’s students. Guest star: Brian George as Dr. Sleevemore, Liz Jenkins as Ms. Pittman, Kylie Cantrall as Jasmine, Mia Sinclair Jenness as Leslie, Faly Rakotohavana as Miles Absent: Sky Katz as Tess
26	13	"Sleevemore Part Two: Found"	Eileen Conn	Norm Gunzenhauser	September 28, 2018	212	1.00
With Booker’s visions gone, he takes up various hobbies and proves to be quite good at everything, while it’s revealed that Nia has his powers and wants to try them out to see what it’s like being like her mother and brother. Raven and Levi soon arrange a rooftop party to deceive Sleevemore’s group, so they can sneak into the facility the doctor works in – while there, they discover something bad. Guest stars: Brian George as Dr. Sleevemore, Kylie Cantrall as Jasmine, Mia Sinclair Jenness as Leslie, Faly Rakotohavana as Miles Absent: Anneliese van der Pol as Chelsea Grayson
27	14	"Sleevemore Part Three: Future"	Eileen Conn	David DiPietro & Paul Ciancarelli	October 5, 2018	213	0.74
Dr. Sleevemore tries to restore Booker’s visions from Nia but the powers are missing. Jasmine admits removing the powers from Nia to prove her theory that powers are only transferable among people with similar DNA. However, she had dropped the goggles and Mitch took them before she could restore the powers. Booker and Nia try to trick Mitch into giving the goggles back but he refuses. By the time he gives the goggles back, the powers float away. Meanwhile, Raven asks Dr. Sleevemore to take her powers and give them to Booker. Instead, he shows Raven two visions to help her realize that her children would be more proud if she pursued her fashion dream instead of sacrificing everything for them. Later after giving up on getting them back, Booker’s visions return during a family hug. Guest stars: Brian George as Dr. Sleevemore, Dylan Martin Frankel as Mitch, Kylie Cantrall as Jasmine, Faly Rakotohavana as Miles Absent: Sky Katz as Tess, Anneliese van der Pol as Chelsea Grayson
28	15	"Raven's Home: Remix"	Paul Hoen	Anthony C. Hill	October 12, 2018	209	0.72
Coach Spitz is holding auditions for a school musical about his life as a basketball player and a rapper. Since Tess is great at both skills, Nia wants her to audition for the lead role but Coach Spitz wants Booker to audition instead because the lead character is a boy. Even though Tess doesn’t want the role, Nia sees it as an opportunity to fight for feminism. She persists until the coach lets Tess audition. Tess wins the lead role but starts to doubt herself before the actual performance. Nia apologizes for pushing Tess to audition instead of listening to her side of the story. Raven tries to get Booker back as the lead but Booker admits that Tess is better suited for it. He helps Tess regain confidence and get back on stage. Guest star: Anthony Alabi as Coach Spitz Songs featured: "I Want This", "Tess Freestyles", "Legendary", "Raven's Pie", "Face of a Movement", "Turnip Juice", "Eye to Eye", "Replay the Moment"
29	16	"Switch-or-Treat"	Leonard R. Garner Jr.	Octavia Bray	October 19, 2018	220	0.71
After seeing themselves in a vision, Raven and Booker inadvertently switch bodies on Halloween just before Raven has a big meeting with Shinée DuBois to review her fashion designs and Booker winning a couples' costume dance while performing the Frankenberry shuffle with Levi. The two must work in each other's shoes before they have a chance to switch back at midnight. Nia gets nervous about her first date with Miles to prove a point to her friends, so she asks her Great Aunt Maureen (who also switched bodies with Miles) to fill in for him. Guest stars: Debbie Allen as Great Aunt Maureen, Michelle Williams as Shinée DuBois, Jenna Davis as Sienna, Laya DeLeon Hayes as Zeena, Faly Rakotohavana as Miles, Kaliko Kauahi as Principal Kwan Absent: Anneliese van der Pol as Chelsea Grayson
30	17	"Just Call Me Vic"	Lynda Tarryk	Adrienne Carter	October 26, 2018	217	0.78
While Chelsea is out of town, Raven's father Victor shows up to help his daughter with comical results. Meanwhile, Booker, Nia, Levi, and Tess come up with alternatives to washing the clothes when the building's washer machines are full. Guest stars: Rondell Sheridan as Victor, Jason Rogel as Sebastian Absent: Anneliese van der Pol as Chelsea Grayson
31	18	"New Dog, Old Trick"	Leonard R. Garner Jr.	LaTonya Croff	November 2, 2018	218	0.69
Nia asks Raven to take her to a retreat hosted by her favorite councilwoman who has been helping the underprivileged. However, her every chance to impress the councilwoman is ruined because Raven is too distracted trying to talk to her fashion idol about her designs. Raven accidentally burns Nia’s speech, causing Nia to miss her opportunity. Nia rewrites it and sneaks in later to the councilwoman’s office disguised as room service. Raven sneaks in too but the councilwoman kicks her out to let Nia read the speech in peace. In the speech, Nia says Raven is her biggest inspiration. Back at home, Booker and Levi offer to watch Sienna’s dog to impress the two new girls in their building. However, the dog embarrasses them by peeing on Booker just as they’re preparing to walk it with the girls. Afterward, the dog destroys Raven’s latest design. Guest stars: Jason Rogel as Sebastian, Jenna Davis as Sienna, Michelle Williams as Shinée DuBois, Dinora Walcott as Councilwoman Sylvia Johnson Absent: Sky Katz as Tess, Anneliese van der Pol as Chelsea Grayson
32	19	"It's Your Party and I'll Spy If I Want To"	Leonard R. Garner Jr.	Angeline Olschewski	November 9, 2018	219	0.85
Booker and Nia are planning their 13th birthday party as Tess, Curtis, The Guntz, Sienna, and Zeena have suggestions to improve it that exclude Raven and Levi excluded. After finding out, Raven enlists Sebastian to help her spy on the party. Guest stars: Jason Rogel as Sebastian, Jenna Davis as Sienna, Laya DeLeon Hayes as Zeena, Donovan Whitfield as Curtis, Nathan Blaiwes as The Guntz, Jason Sweat as Fireman Alexandre Absent: Anneliese van der Pol as Chelsea Grayson
33	20	"Winners and Losers"	Ron Moseley	Michael Feldman	November 16, 2018	216	0.81
Principal Kwan makes Booker and Nia school ambassadors where they must help out the school. Unfortunately, their first job is to welcome new student Mitch who starts to steal their friends. Meanwhile, Raven finds out that Levi stayed home to keep an eye on his mother's plants while Chelsea is away. Guest stars: Dylan Martin Frankel as Mitch, Laya DeLeon Hayes as Zeena, Kaliko Kauahi as Principal Kwan Absent: Anneliese van der Pol as Chelsea Grayson
34	21	"Keepin' It Real"	Leonard R. Garner Jr.	Paul Ciancarelli & David DiPietro	November 30, 2018	221	0.75
Raven books social media influencer Lil Z to appear at the launch of her Ravenous fashion line. Lil Z wants to keep a low profile. However, when Nia becomes determined to raise money for several causes at school, the children agree to sell raffle tickets where the winner gets to spend a day with Lil Z. Sienna wins and the twins convince her not to mention the raffle tickets. However, she later tags him in an online photo. Lil Z becomes upset at them for using him without his permission. When Lil Z quits, the children come up with a plan for Booker to pretend to be him during the fashion show. After finding out what happened, Raven and Lil Z’s mother convince him to return. Raven has a successful fashion show and officially launches Ravenous. Guest stars: Jason Rogel as Sebastian, Jenna Davis as Sienna, Laya DeLeon Hayes as Zeena, Donovan Whitfield as Curtis, Nathan Blaiwes as The Guntz, Brandon Severs Jr. as Lil Z, Karen Malina White as Loretta, Tiffany Yvonne Cox as Latonya Absent: Anneliese van der Pol as Chelsea Grayson

=== Season 3 (2019–20) ===
No. overall	No. in season	Title	Directed by	Written by	Original release date	Prod. code	U.S. viewers (millions)
35	1	"Friend-Ship"	Trevor Kirschner	Eunetta T. Boone	June 17, 2019	303	0.63
When Levi starts missing his mother, Raven takes the family on a trip to visit Chelsea at the cruise ship where she works. On the way, they get a flat tire, but Nia texts Tess who brings them a new one and joins the trip. Meanwhile, Chelsea has been struggling at work and wants to come home, but agrees to wait for them. Upon arrival, the children go to look for Chelsea in the ship; however, Chelsea is at the dock where she reunites with Raven. When the ship starts moving, Raven and Chelsea are unable to get to the children. Since it could take five days for the ship to get to the next port, Raven and Chelsea take jet skis to go after the children. Guest stars: Roz Ryan as Miss Bertha, Afomia Hailemeskel as Bailey
36	2	"Lost at Chel-Sea"	Trevor Kirschner	Warren Hutcherson	June 24, 2019	304	0.74
Raven and Chelsea take a jet ski to follow the ship with their children but the jet ski runs out of fuel in the middle of the ocean. They call for help and are rescued hours later by the Coast Guard. Meanwhile, Nia, Booker, Levi and Tess are enjoying themselves on the ship just before learning that Chelsea is getting fired. With help of his friends, Levi puts on a show to try to save his mother's job. After an emotional speech about missing their parents, the children get support from the other passengers in reaching out for help. Raven and Chelsea are reunited with their children, after which Chelsea comes back home. Guest stars: Roz Ryan as Miss Bertha, Afomia Hailemeskel as Bailey, Robert Curtis Brown as Coast Guard Captain Rob
37	3	"Smoky Flow"	Sheldon Epps	LaTonya Croft	July 1, 2019	301	0.51
Booker, Nia, and Tess form a musical group called the Chi-Lective. With Booker as their video editor, they work on their first musical video in Tess' apartment which Raven and Chelsea were unaware of.
38	4	"Twister, Sister"	Sheldon Epps	Chase Heinrich & Micah Steinberg	July 8, 2019	302	0.59
Devon takes Booker and Nia to Dallas, Texas for the weekend. Booker challenges Nia's activism where she accompanies Devon to a live report where a strong storm is approaching. Guest star: Jonathan McDaniel as Devon
39	5	"Dress to Express"	Danielle Fishel	Octavia Bray	July 15, 2019	306	0.54
Levi sees how a person's style causes them to act. He makes a documentary about them and even has Booker and Nia change their outfits with surprising results. Guest stars: Kaliko Kauahi as Principal Kwan, Jenna Davis as Sienna, Sean Philip Glasgow as Delaney
40	6	"Diss Track"	Wendy Faraone	Zora Bikangaga	July 22, 2019	305	0.56
A rival music group of the Chi-Lective called the 3 Go's (consisting of Gilbert "Quatro" Metusa, his twin brother Herbert "Pump Fake" Metusa, and their cousin Lloyd "Lil Lo-Lo" Metusa) has made a diss track that makes fun of Booker. He ropes the Chi-Lectives in coming up with a diss track towards them which has varying results. Guest stars: Kaliko Kauahi as Principal Kwan, Amari O'Neal as Quatro, Amir O'Neal as Pump-Fake, Travis Wolfe Jr. as Lil Lo-Lo, Taja V. Simpson as Mrs. Mutesa
41	7	"Disorder in the Court"	Leonard R. Garner Jr.	Susan Jaffee	September 13, 2019	307	0.57
Chelsea's ex-husband Garrett has been released from prison and comes up with a broom counterpart for Chelsea's Schmop called the Schbroom. This causes Chelsea and Raven to take this issue to the TV show "Judge Giovanni" which stars the titular judge that Raven is a fan of. Levi gets involved in the case as well. Meanwhile, Booker, Nia, and Tess take an offer from Camille Henry and her mother to have the Chi-Lective perform at the birthday party of Camille's younger brother Dylan as they try to appease the guests. Guest star: Johnno Wilson as Garrett, Tim Bagley as Judge Giovanni
42	8	"School House Trap"	Wendy Faraone	LaTonya Croff	September 20, 2019	309	0.48
The Chi-Lective is in the running to advance to the finals of the music video competition. Booker has gotten a bad grade in his history due to his short studying routine and persuades Nia to forge Raven's signature. They get busted and Raven grounds them. With help from Chelsea, Tess persuades Raven to let her and Nia use a remembering strategy to help Booker pass the make-up test. At the same time, Raven plots to use the building's laundry room for herself by putting up fake out of order signs. Guest star: Andy Bustillos as Mr. Clark
43	9	"Cali Dreams"	Jon Rosenbaum	Zora Bikangaga	September 27, 2019	310	0.44
The Baxters and the Graysons head to California so that the Chi-Lective can compete in the show Radio Eclipse Live hosted by Chris Spring-Lake. Devon is also there in attendance due to him being an old friend of Chris. The Chi-Lective faces some competition from the a cappella group N'Charmony. Guest stars: Jaleel White as Chris Spring-Lake, Jonathan McDaniel as Devon, Dior Goodjohn as Duchess, Afra Sophia Tully as Chloe, Lily Huynh as June
44	10	"Creepin' It Real"	Rich Correll	Warren Hutcherson	October 11, 2019	314	0.63
Guest stars: Michael Minto as Darnell, Bryan Coffee as Andy
45	11	"Girls Just Wanna Have Phones"	Danielle Fishel	Chase Heinrich & Micah Steinberg	October 18, 2019	308	0.51
Guest star: Teshi Thomas as Danni
46	12	"Friday Night Tights"	Leonard R. Garner Jr.	Eunetta T. Boone	October 25, 2019	311	0.52
Guest stars: Teshi Thomas as Danni, Amarr M. Wooten as Logan, Tyler Poelle as Jax Jackson
47	13	"It's Not Easy Being Green"	Lynda Tarryk	Susan Jaffee	November 1, 2019	312	0.52
Guest stars: Teshi Thomas as Danni, Maral Milani as Sasha, Beth Lacke as Margaret
48	14	"Crewed Up"	Lynda Tarryk	Octavia Bray	November 15, 2019	313	0.43
Guest stars: Anthony Alabi as Coach Spitz, Travis Wolfe Jr. as Lil Lo-Lo, Jordyn Curet as Alexandra
49	15	"Sorry to Father You"	Raven-Symoné	Chase Heinrich & Micah Steinberg	November 22, 2019	315	0.47
Guest stars: Jonathan McDaniel as Devon, Johnno Wilson as Garrett, Gabriel Hogan as Sergeant Flex
50	16	"Bah Humbugged"	Kim Fields	LaTonya Croff	December 6, 2019	319	0.42
Guest stars: Jonathan McDaniel as Devon, Johnno Wilson as Garrett
51	17	"The Foreign Identity"	Wendy Faraone	Savannah Kopp	February 23, 2020	316	0.56
Guest star: Edouard Holdener as Timothée
52	18	"What About Your Friends?"	Warren Hutcherson	LaTonya Croff	March 1, 2020	324	0.48
Booker's new friends William and Jordan pressure him and Curtis to try vaping, but he turns them down. When Coach Spitz walks in on Booker with William's vape pen (he was trying to show William, Jordan and Curtis how stupid vaping was), his "friends" accuse him of seemingly pressuring them to vape. As there is a zero-toleration policy, Coach Spitz suspends Booker from school. However, Nia finds out that Booker can argue his case in a preliminary hearing. Booker, with his phone recording, tries to get a confession out of William, but fails. He convinces Curtis to speak up for him, but the latter refuses. At the hearing, Nia isn't able to defend Booker. Booker makes a speech on the effects of vaping, adding that it cannot only hurt your lungs, but hurt friendships, looking over to Curtis as he says it. This speech makes Curtis stand up from his seat, speaking up and telling the truth. As Booker's suspension is lifted, William, Jordan and Curtis deal with the consequences of their actions, not before Curtis reconciles with Booker. Guest stars: Anthony Alabi as Coach Spitz, Donovan Whitfield as Curtis, Andy Bustillos as Mr. Clark, Joachim Powell as William, Hunter Payton as Jordan, Aloma Wright as Ms. Pearl
53	19	"Adolessons"	Danielle Fishel	Jason Hauser	March 8, 2020	317	0.29
Guest stars: Jonathan McDaniel as Devon, BJ Tanner as Vance
54	20	"Close Shave"	Rich Correll	Zora Bikangaga	March 15, 2020	318	0.53
Guest stars: Jaleel White as Chris Spring-Lake, Charles Robinson as Mr. Arthur
55	21	"Hoop Streams"	Trevor Kirschner	Octavia Bray	March 22, 2020	320	0.42
Guest stars: Anthony Alabi as Coach Spitz, Travis Wolfe as Lil Lo-Lo
56	22	"Slammed"	Raven-Symoné	Susan Jaffee	March 29, 2020	321	0.48
Guest stars: Jordyn Curet as Alexandra, Cheryl Lynn Bowers as Mrs. Dunagan, Karamo Brown as Miguel
57	23	"On Edge"	Lynda Tarryk	Adrienne Carter	April 5, 2020	322	0.35
Guest stars: Charlie Robinson as Mr. Arthur, Donovan Whitfield as Curtis, Max Torina as Ramon
58	24	"The Story So-fa"	Danielle Fishel	Chase Heinrich & Micah Steinberg	April 19, 2020	323	0.40
Guest stars: Mindy Sterling as Grandma Zo, Shania Accius as Maren
59	25	"In-Shoe-encer"	Rich Correll	Savannah Kopp & Jason Hauser	April 26, 2020	325	0.48
Guest star: Jordyn Curet as Alexandra
60	26	"Level Up"	Rich Correll	Teleplay by : Raven-Symoné & Warren Hutcherson; Story by : Savannah Kopp & Jason Hauser	May 3, 2020	326	0.40
Guest stars: Jaleel White as Chris Spring-Lake, Jordyn Curet as Alexandra, Max Torina as Ramon

=== Season 4 (2020–21) ===
No. overall	No. in season	Title	Directed by	Written by	Original release date	Prod. code	U.S. viewers (millions)
61	1	"Raven About Bunk'd"	Trevor Kirschner	Warren Hutcherson	July 24, 2020	409	0.72
Special guest stars: Miranda May as Lou, Mallory James Mahoney as Destiny, Raphael Alejandro as Matteo, Will Buie Jr. as Finn, Shelby Simmons as Ava, Scarlett Estevez as Gwen, Israel Johnson as Noah
62	2	"Don't Trust the G in Apt 4B"	Rich Correll	Chase Heinrich & Micah Steinberg	October 9, 2020	407	0.65
Guest stars: Max Torina as Ramon, Samantha Jacks as Peggy
63	3	"Baking Bad"	Robbie Countryman	Chase Heinrich & Micah Steinberg	October 23, 2020	401	0.38
Guest stars: Shania Accius as Maren, Cyrina Fiallo as Mei, Aidan McGraw as Asher
64	4	"Big Little Surprise"	Kelly Park	Jordana Arkin	November 6, 2020	402	0.35
Guest stars: Malea Emma Tjandrawidjaja as Sunrise Mahoney, Noel Arthur as Chuck
65	5	"Tesscue Me"	Leonard R. Garner Jr.	Jason Hauser	November 13, 2020	403	0.40
Guest stars: Siena Agudong as Mikka, Julie Wittner as Janelle, Sissy Sheridan as Layla
66	6	"Sharp Job-jects"	Wendy Faraone	Octavia Bray	November 20, 2020	404	0.48
Guest star: Mona Mira as Priya
67	7	"How I Met Your Mentor"	Morenike Joela Evans	Alison Taylor	November 27, 2020	405	0.25
Guest star: Tori Kostic as Sasha
68	8	"Mad About Yuletide"	Wendy Faraone	Marcelo Chow & Brett Maier; Caitlin Davis	December 18, 2020	413–414	0.38
Guest stars: Jonathan McDaniel as Devon, Johnno Wilson as Garrett, Max Torina as Ramon
69	9	"Wheel of Misfortune"	Danielle Fishel	Rasheena Nash	March 19, 2021	406	0.32
Guest stars: Max Torina as Ramon, Kyla-Drew as Angelica, Christopher T. Wood as Principal Jones
70	10	"Diff'rent Strikes"	Raven-Symoné	Dave Helem	March 26, 2021	408	0.26
Guest stars: Christopher T. Wood as Principal Jones, Christina Rodriguez as Mary, Noen Perez as David
71	11	"Fresh Off the Note"	Lynda Tarryk	Jordana Arkin	April 2, 2021	410	0.32
Guest stars: Max Torina as Ramon, Alison Fernandez as Olivia
72	12	"10 Things Debate About You"	Raven-Symoné	Jason Hauser	April 9, 2021	411	0.33
Guest stars: Cyrina Fiallo as Mei, Coby Ryan McLaughlin as Mr. Argo, Paul-Mikél Williams as Wyatt
73	13	"Plays of Our Lives"	Robbie Countryman	Octavia Bray	April 16, 2021	412	0.28
Guest stars: Max Torina as Ramon, Paul-Mikél Williams as Wyatt, Andy Bustillos as Mr. Clark, David Lengel as Director Kim
74	14	"The Slumber Years"	Sonia Bhalla	Jason Hauser	April 23, 2021	415	0.27
75	15	"Bless This Tess"	Ian Jordan	Chase Heinrich & Micah Steinberg	April 30, 2021	416	0.30
76	16	"American Torah Story"	Bryan W. McKenzie	Jordana Arkin	May 7, 2021	417	0.25
Guest star: Johnno Wilson as Garrett
77	17	"Say Yes to the Protest"	Danielle Fishel	Darnell Jones	May 14, 2021	418	0.31
78	18	"Saved by the Belle"	Jon Rosenbaum	Rasheena Nash	May 21, 2021	419	0.40
Guest stars: Max Torina as Ramon, Kyla-Drew as Angelica Absent: Sky Katz as Tess
79	19	"So You Think You Can Drive"	Raven-Symoné	Dave Helem	May 21, 2021	420	0.33
Guest stars: Jonathan McDaniel as Devon Absent: Sky Katz as Tess

=== Season 5 (2022) ===
No. overall	No. in season	Title	Directed by	Written by	Original release date	Prod. code	U.S. viewers (millions)
80	1	"The Wrong Victor"	Victor Gonzalez	Jed Elinoff & Scott Thomas	March 11, 2022	501	0.24
Guest stars: Peggy Blow as Nurse Julie, David Shatraw as Keith the Cabbie
81	2	"The Big Sammich"	Robbie Countryman	Anthony C. Hill	March 18, 2022	502	0.30
82	3	"Escape from Pal-Catraz"	Lynda Tarryk	Jim Martin	March 25, 2022	503	0.14
Guest stars: Ernie Grunwald as Lazlo, Sonya Leslie as Beth
83	4	"A Streetcar Named Conspire"	Lynda Tarryk	Robin M. Henry	April 1, 2022	504	0.19
Guest stars: Marissa Reyes as Cami, Parvesh Cheena as Conductor
84	5	"Clique Bait"	Evelyn Belasco	Jai Joseph	April 8, 2022	505	0.16
Guest stars: Adrienne Houghton as Alana, Marissa Reyes as Cami
85	6	"21 Lunch Street"	Robbie Countryman	Nori Reed	April 15, 2022	506	0.26
Guest stars: Ashley Tavares as Ms. Linda, Eileen Galindo as Andrea Walker, Adrienne Houghton as Alana, Miguel A. Núñez, Jr. as Stone
86	7	"Retreat Yourself"	Lynda Tarryk	Kourtney Richard	April 22, 2022	507	0.17
Guest stars: French Stewart as Indigo, Pyper Braun as Paige, Yonas Kibreab as Ernie
87	8	"New Kid on the Chopping Block"	Mary Lou Belli	Brittany Assaly & Danielle Calvert	April 29, 2022	508	0.18
Guest stars: Adrienne Houghton as Alana, Marissa Reyes as Cami, Caleb Baumann as Liam Absent: Rondell Sheridan as Victor
88	9	"Mr. Petracelli's Revenge"	Leonard R. Garner Jr.	Anthony C. Hill	May 6, 2022	509	0.18
Guest stars: Fred Stoller as Mr. Petracelli, Jillian Rose Reed as Nori
89	10	"Date Expectations"	Morenike Joela Evans	Jed Elinoff & Scott Thomas	May 13, 2022	510	0.19
Guest stars: Adrienne Houghton as Alana, Marissa Reyes as Cami, Ernie Grunwald as Lazlo Absent: Rondell Sheridan as Victor
90	11	"The Great Chill Grill Giveaway"	Rondell Sheridan	Jim Martin	June 10, 2022	511	0.20
Guest stars: Marissa Reyes as Cami, Ernie Grunwald as Lazlo, Samm Levine as Newt Slackley, Yvette Cason as Grace Absent: Rondell Sheridan as Victor
91	12	"Truth or Hair"	Danielle Fishel	Robin M. Henry	June 17, 2022	512	N/A
Guest stars: Ashley August as Janice, Shawn Harrison as Sir Leo
92	13	"Munch Ado About Lunching"	Morenike Joela Evans	Jai Joseph	June 24, 2022	513	0.13
Guest stars: Adrienne Houghton as Alana, Marissa Reyes as Cami
93	14	"To Halve & Halve Not"	Jade Jenise Dixon	Kourtney Richard	July 1, 2022	514	0.20
Guest stars: Samm Levine as Newt Slackley, Pyper Braun as Paige
94	15	"The Fierce Awakens"	Ian Reed Kesler	Nori Reed	July 8, 2022	517	0.18
Guest stars: Marissa Reyes as Cami, Juliana Joel as Nikki Absent: Rondell Sheridan as Victor
95	16	"The Grand Booker-Pest Hotel"	Raven-Symoné	Marcelo Chow & Brett Maier	July 15, 2022	518	0.13
Guest stars: Juliana Joel as Nikki, Raquel Justice as Avery, Kyle More as Bjorn, Brandilyn Cheah as Lisbeth
96	17	"The Girl Who Cried Tasha"	Victor Gonzalez	Brittany Assaly & Danielle Calvert	October 2, 2022	515	0.11
Guest stars: James McCauley as Leonard Stevenson, Lela Hoffmeister as Tasha
97	18	"Tying the Astro-Knot"	Monica Marie Contreras	Jai Joseph	October 7, 2022	519	0.11
Guest stars: Samm Levine as Newt Slackley, Ann Hu as Dr. Chen, Lonyé Petrine as Cassie, Joshua Triplett as Flint Absent: Rondell Sheridan as Victor
98	19	"Keeping It 100"	Raven-Symoné	Jed Elinoff & Scott Thomas	October 14, 2022	520	0.10
Special guest star: Anneliese van der Pol as Chelsea Guest stars: Adrienne Houghton as Alana, Ernie Grunwald as Lazlo, Mykal-Michelle Harris as Young Raven, Scarlett Roselynn as Young Chelsea, Emily Nicole Gonzales as Young Alana
99	20	"Stylin' & Profilin'"	Raven-Symoné	Anthony C. Hill	October 21, 2022 (Note: This episode was first released on Disney+ on October 19, 2022.)	521	0.12
Guest star: Lex Medlin as Officer Riley
100	21	"Big Burger, Small Fry"	Raven-Symoné	Anthony C. Hill	October 28, 2022	522	0.14
Guest star: Piper Curda as Rose
101	22	"Raven and the Fashion Factory"	Raven-Symoné	Jim Martin	November 4, 2022	523	0.16
Guest stars: Anne-Marie Johnson as Donna Cabonna, Mario Cantone as Branthony, Juliana Joel as Nikki, Daniele Lawson as Zora, Jecobi Swain as Dylan Absent: Rondell Sheridan as Victor
102	23	"A Day Without Baxters"	Jed Elinoff	Robin M. Henry	November 11, 2022	524	0.13
Guest stars: Adrienne Houghton as Alana, Ernie Grunwald as Lazlo, Juliana Joel as Nikki, Terri Hoyos as Ms. Flores
103	24	"Bridge Over Troubled Daughter"	Ian Jordan	Jed Elinoff & Scott Thomas	November 18, 2022	525	0.11
Special guest star: T'Keyah Crystal Keymah as Tanya Guest stars: Ernie Grunwald as Lazlo
104	25	"A Country Cousin Christmas"	Victor Gonzalez	Salemah Gabriel	December 2, 2022	516	0.16
Alice's mother Betty Jane comes to San Francisco for Christmas to spend time with her daughter. Meanwhile, Booker loses a present to him and enlists Neil to help find it. At the same time, Victor contends with his cousin Delroy when he shows up with Betty Jane. Guest stars: Giovonnie Samuels as Betty Jane, Kaden Chea as Lamar, Raven-Symoné as Delroy

=== Season 6 (2023) ===
No. overall	No. in season	Title	Directed by	Written by	Original release date	Prod. code	U.S. viewers (millions)
105	1	"European Rae-cation: Part 1"	Raven-Symoné	Jed Elinoff & Scott Thomas	April 9, 2023	601	0.09
Guest stars: Ernie Grunwald as Lazlo, Mather Zickel as Rafferty, Christopher Grove as King Charles, John Bishop as Snake Absent: Emmy Liu-Wang as Ivy
106	2	"European Rae-cation: Part 2"	Raven-Symoné	Jed Elinoff & Scott Thomas	April 16, 2023	602	0.23
Guest stars: Ernie Grunwald as Lazlo, Mather Zickel as Rafferty, Christopher Grove as King Charles, John Bishop as Snake Absent: Emmy Liu-Wang as Ivy
107	3	"Sold to the Highest Fibber"	Robbie Countryman	Anthony C. Hill	April 23, 2023 (Note: This episode was first released on Disney+ on April 19, 2023.)	603	0.13
Guest star: Ernie Grunwald as Lazlo Absent: Emmy Liu-Wang as Ivy
108	4	"Blues Beard's Revenge"	Lynda Tarryk	Molly Halderman	May 7, 2023	604	0.15
Guest stars: Ernie Grunwald as Lazlo, Pyper Braun as Paige, Kyrie McAlpin as Kelly Quintana
109	5	"Tess Friends Forever"	Raven-Symoné	Jordan Mitchell	May 14, 2023	605	0.09
Special guest star: Sky Katz as Tess O'Malley Guest star: Ernie Grunwald as Lazlo
110	6	"A.I., A.I., Oh... Snap!"	Ian Reed Kesler	Robin M. Henry	May 21, 2023	606	0.11
Guest stars: Juliana Joel as Nikki, Jecobi Swain as Dylan, Lilla Crawford as Greta Gardunkian
111	7	"Lizard Let Lie"	Jed Elinoff	Nori Reed	June 4, 2023	607	0.10
Guest stars: Kym Whitley as Tricia, Nicole Sullivan as Ms. Liza
112	8	"Ain't That a Sidekick in the Head"	Victor Gonzalez	Rick Williams	June 11, 2023	608	0.12
Guest star: Peggy Blow as Nurse Julie Absent: Rondell Sheridan as Victor
113	9	"What Had Happened Was…"	Raven-Symoné	Robin M. Henry & Rick Williams & Mattie Bayne	June 18, 2023 (Note: This episode was first released on Disney+ on June 14, 2023.)	610	0.23
Guest stars: Jecobi Swan as Dylan, Marissa Reyes as Cami, Rachna Khatau as Ms. Patel, Gable Swanlund as Bree
114	10	"Sneaks and Geeks"	Lynda Tarryk	Brittany Assaly & Danielle Calvert	June 25, 2023	609	0.12
Guest star: Lesli Margherita as Mariana
115	11	"Reality Check"	Ian Jordan	Brittany Assaly & Danielle Calvert	July 2, 2023	611	0.21
Guest star: Percy Rustomji as Jules
116	12	"Working for the Weeknd"	Rondell Sheridan	Robin M. Henry & Rick Williams	July 23, 2023	612	0.13
Guest stars: Chloë Berlinger as Andie, Matt Richards as Stage Manager
117	13	"Drop it Like it's Hot!"	Scott Thomas	Anthony C. Hill	July 30, 2023 (Note: This episode was first released on Disney+ on July 26, 2023.)	613	0.12
Guest stars: Juliana Joel as Nikki, Preston Garcia as N-Zo
118	14	"Raven's Clone"	Shilpi Roy	Mattie Bayne	August 6, 2023	614	0.13
Guest stars: Juliana Joel as Nikki, Jecobi Swain as Dylan, Gable Swanlund as Bree, Asia Martin as Emily, Allison Scagliotti as Event Coordinator
119	15	"Cuda I Have This Dance?"	Raven-Symoné	Alex Fox & Rachel Lewis	August 13, 2023	615	0.13
Guest stars: Isaiah Morgan as Cuda, Maxwele D'Angelo as DJ
120	16	"You've Got Sale"	Shilpi Roy	Teleplay by : Jordan Mitchell; Story by : Danny Levy	August 20, 2023	616	0.08
Guest star: Isa Eden as Anita
121	17	"Gown to the Wire"	Lynda Tarryk	Molly Haldeman	August 27, 2023	617	0.09
Guest stars: Orlando Jones as Mr. Giorgio, Darien Sills-Evans as Mr. Reynolds, Tatiana Piccone as Administrator
122	18	"Whose Line Is It Anyway?"	Raven-Symoné	Jed Elinoff & Scott Thomas	September 3, 2023	618	0.11
Guest star: Rafael Petardi as Stefano, Juliana Joel as Nikki
