= Okwui Okpokwasili =

American artist and actress (born 1972)

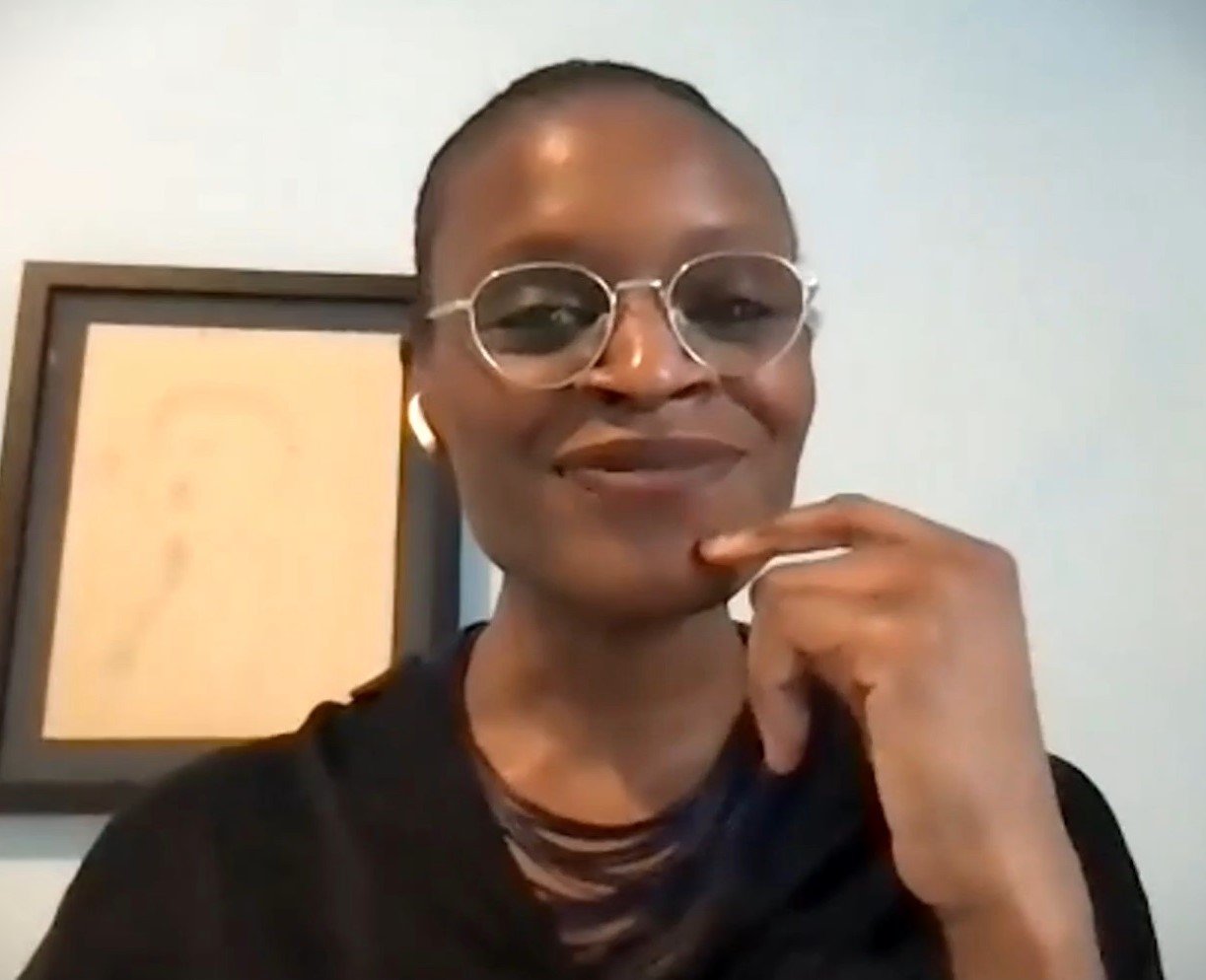
- Okpokwasili in 2021
- Born: August 6, 1972 (age 54); The Bronx, New York, U.S.
- Citizenship: Nigeria; United States
- Occupations: Artist; actress; performer; choreographer; writer

Okwui Okpokwasili (/ˈoʊkwi oʊkˈpoʊkwəsɪli/; born August 6, 1972) is a Nigerian-American artist, actress, performer, choreographer, and writer. Her multidisciplinary performances draw upon her training in theatre, and she describes her work as at "the intersection of theatre, dance, and the installation." Okpokwasili is known for appearing as Vertigo in the television miniseries Agatha All Along.

Several of her works relate to historical events in Nigeria. She is especially interested in cultural and historical memory and how the Western imagination perceives African bodies.

== Early life ==
Okpokwasili was born August 6, 1972, in The Bronx, New York, daughter of Igbo Nigerian immigrants who moved to the United States to escape the Nigerian Civil War in the late 1960s. She grew up in Parkchester, Bronx.

She attended Yale University, where she met filmmaker Andrew Rossi, who made a documentary about her piece Bronx Gothic.

== Career ==
Okpokwasili has become a key figure in the New York experimental dance scene. She is known for several one-woman performances and for her frequent collaborations with Ralph Lemon and Peter Born, her husband. Born often directs and designs the lighting and staging for Okpokwasili's performances.

She is also known for her role in the music video for the Jay-Z song "4:44", from the album of the same name.

In April 2017, she performed at Mass MOCA, responding to Nick Cave's massive installation work Until with a site-specific dance. The performance was co-sponsored by Jacob's Pillow dance center; choreographer Bill T. Jones performed earlier in the series of artists responding to Cave's installation.

She played the part of KK in Josephine Decker's 2018 film, Madeline's Madeline.

In a theatrical role, Okpokwasili performed the part of Hippolyta in Julie Taymor's 2013 production of Shakespeare's A Midsummer Night's Dream.

In 2023, Okpokwasili starred in The Exorcist: Believer alongside Leslie Odom Jr.

In 2024, Okpokwasili played Vertigo of the Salem's Seven in Agatha All Along.

== Works ==
=== Pent Up: A Revenge Dance ===
This was her first collaborative piece with her husband Born. She won a 2010 New York Dance Award and a 2009 Performance Bessie Award for Outstanding Production. Centering on a mother and daughter, the work considered cultural and generational clashes.

=== Bronx Gothic ===
In this 90-minute one-woman semi-autobiographical performance which she also choreographed, Okpokwasili plays two young black girls talking about growing up, feeling vulnerable, and discovering sexuality. As the audience enters, she is already on the stage and is trembling in a dark slip. Eventually, she begins to speak the dialogue of the two girls in conversation.

The work is the subject of a documentary by Andrew Rossi that shares the title of the performance work. The film illuminates the process of creating the work; includes clips of Okpokwasili answering questions from the audience when she toured the piece, and candid discussions with her husband about race; and features her parents and their reaction to her art. Cultural critic Hilton Als praised this piece in a 2017 review of Poor People's TV Room. The piece was commissioned by Danspace Project and Performance Space 122 in 2014.

=== When I Return Who Will Receive Me ===
A group performance involving seven female performers singing, speaking, and dancing, this work was staged in the underground magazine of Fort Jay at Governors Island in July 2016 as part of The River to River Festival. This performance included fragments of research on Nigerian history as it relates to women's bodies that were used to develop Poor People's TV Room. During the two-hour duration of the performance, the audience was permitted to move through the space of the military cavern, while the performers moved throughout the installation spaces. The work was commissioned by the Lower Manhattan Cultural Council.

=== Poor People's TV Room ===
This work considers the subject of women's resistance movements in Nigeria, specifically the Women's War in 1929, when the country was under British rule, and the kidnapping of 300 schoolgirls in 2014 by Boko Haram. As part of this project, Okpokwasili also researched the film industry in Nigeria, known as Nollywood, considering representations of women in a cinema where African and Western cultures intersect.

In an interview with Jenn Joy for Bomb magazine, Okpokwasili stated that the piece "is about a critical absence that I feel when a tragedy happens—like the kidnapping of girls by Boko Haram and the Women's War in Nigeria. My work is not explicitly about the incredible women in northern Nigeria who came together to shame their government into doing something to get these 300 abducted girls back. African women are not just victims of colonizers and oppressive or corrupt governments. They have been building collectives and advocating and fighting to be visible for a long time. I don’t want to make documentary work—but I don’t want these women to disappear, either. My piece is about visibility."

She has cited as a major influence the Nigerian novelist Amos Tutuola, who is known for incorporating elements of Yoruba folklore into his works.

The research Okpokwasili completed for Poor People's TV Room also informed Sitting on a Man’s Head, a work the artist presented at the 2018 Berlin Biennale.

== Awards and honors ==
Okpokwasili has received several Bessie Awards for her performances, including works she has written and developed herself. In 2018, she was named a MacArthur Fellow, a prestigious "Genius Award" intended to enable recipients to further develop their talent.

=== Residencies ===
- 2013: New York Foundation for the Arts Fellowship in Choreography
- 2013: Visiting Artist at Rhode Island School of Design with Ralph Lemon
- 2014–15: Lower Manhattan Cultural Council's Extended Life Program
- 2016: Creative Capital Grant
- 2015–17: Randjelovic/Stryker Commissioned Artist at New York Live Arts

== Filmography ==
Projects are feature films unless otherwise noted.

Year	Project	Role	Notes
2004	Filter City	Herself	Short film
2005	The Interpreter	Tour Guide	
2006	Finally	Herself	Short film
2006	The Hoax	Malika	
2007	I Am Legend	Infected	
2007	Love Suicides	Wedding Singer	
2008	Oblique	Herself	Short film
2010	Abyss	O	Short film
2014	Julie Taymor's A Midsummer Night's Dream	Queen Hippolyta	
2015	Her Composition	Kim	
2017	"4:44"	Dancer	Music video
2018	Madeline's Madeline	KK	
2019	It's Not About Jimmy Keene	Aliza	Short film
2020	The Blacklist	Gordon Kemp's Lawyer	TV series 1 episode
2022	Master	Custodial Worker	
2022	Remote	Unoaku	
2023	The Exorcist: Believer	Doctor Beehibe	
2024	Keep Looking	Taiwo	Short film
2024	Agatha All Along	Vertigo	TV series 3 episodes
2025	The Woman in the Yard	The Woman	
