= The Slumber Party =

- Promotional poster
- Genre: Coming-of-age; Comedy
- Based on: The Sleepover by Jen Malone
- Screenplay by: Eydie Faye
- Directed by: Veronica Rodriguez
- Starring: Darby Camp; Emmy Liu-Wang; Alex Cooper Cohen; Valentina Herrera; Dallas Liu; Ramon Jose Rodriguez; Caroline Valencia; Paula Pell; Tituss Burgess
- Music by: Joseph Shirley
- Country of origin: United States
- Original language: English

Production
- Executive producers: Jake Fuller; Tony Hernandez; John Hodges; Ron Howard; Brian Grazer; Stephanie Sperber; Jennilee Cummings
- Producer: Matthew Spiegel
- Editor: Jesse Gordon
- Running time: 82 minutes
- Production companies: Imagine Kids+Family; Jax Media

Original release
- Network: Disney Channel
- Release: July 27, 2023

The Slumber Party is an American coming-of-age comedy television film directed by Veronica Rodriguez from a teleplay by Eydie Faye. It is based on the 2016 novel The Sleepover by Jen Malone. The film stars Darby Camp, Emmy Liu-Wang, Alex Cooper Cohen, Valentina Herrera, Dallas Liu, and Ramon Rodriguez. It premiered on July 27, 2023, on Disney Channel. The film received generally positive reviews from critics.

== Plot ==
Megan is a 14-year-old girl who is afraid of trying new things. She hangs out with her confident friend Paige and birthday girl Anna Maria, the latter of whom is going through family troubles involving her divorced parents and soon-to-be step-siblings including Veronica, a goofy and overconfident girl. The four girls decide to have a sleepover at Anna Maria's house to celebrate the day before her birthday, which just so happens to also be the day of her father's wedding, something that irritates her, especially when he insists on taking her hiking. Anna Maria's younger sister Penny wants to join the others, but they kick her out. For the night, Veronica invites Mesmer, a hypnotist, who in actuality is a desperate actor. With nothing better to do, the girls agree to have him hypnotize them.

The next morning, Megan wakes up to discover that her left eyebrow has been shaven off and she is wearing the hoodie that belongs to her crush Jake Ramirez, whose house has been TPd. There are baby ducks in the bathtub, Veronica's clothes are on backwards and she is wearing long fingernails, and Paige has literal blood on her hands. Anna Maria is missing and Penny appears to be somewhat ignorant as to what happened as well. Not wanting to let Anna Maria's mother know that they cannot find her, they decide to go looking themselves. Believing that the ducks came from school, the girls hire Paige's older brother Mikey to help sneak them in. Upon returning the ducks, save for one, they find Anna Maria's shoe. The group escape the Principal and drive out to discover that the shoe has paint on it matching the school colors of their rival Hillside.

Mikey drops the girls off at Hillside where they are confronted by the marching band who demand the return of their mascot float Hedgie, showing them video footage of the girls stealing it. They promise to give them back something of theirs if they return it. The girls cannot remember where the float is, but Veronica figures out that Mesmer is working at the Onion Festival. The girls sneak in to try and see him, but end up in the middle of an onion eating contest with Veronica winning, and lose Mesmer. With no other option, the girls go to see Jake who reveals that he has Hedgie in his garage. The girls and Jake ride the float down the street and deliver it to the marching band who reveal that they simply had Megan's outdated phone.

Jake reveals that Penny was the one who filmed their escapades and Paige and Veronica go and torture her dolls to get the truth, while Megan and Jake admit their feelings for each other. Penny admits that Anna Maria left a note for them, but she took it out of spite. The note reveals that Anna Maria went hiking on her own without her dad and the girls find her asleep on a bench with tampons up her bloody nose. Anna Maria admits that she is afraid of change and her expanding family, but the girls comfort her and get her ready for the wedding. Anna Maria makes peace with her family, as Veronica reveals that she is seeing Mikey, much to Paige's chagrin. As the girls privately celebrate Anna Maria's birthday, they run into Mesmer again who gives them trigger word to reawaken their memories, "Freshman". The girls suddenly remember everything that happened last night.

The credits reveal that Paige accidentally hit Anna Maria in the nose, explaining the blood, and that Jake was present when his house was TPd, bonding with Megan right away.

== Cast ==
- Darby Camp as Megan Brookman, a 14-year-old girl who is afraid of trying new things.
- Emmy Liu-Wang as Paige, Megan's best friend who is fearless and loyal.
- Alex Cooper Cohen as Veronica, Anna Maria's overconfident soon-to-be stepsister.
- Valentina Herrera as Anna Maria Guerrero, one of Megan's best friends who is struggling with her parents' divorce while celebrating her birthday.
- Dallas Liu as Mikey, Paige's older brother.
- Ramon Jose Rodriguez as Jake Ramirez, Megan's crush whom she obtains a hoodie from.
- Caroline Valencia as Penny Guerrero, Anna Maria's younger sister.
- Jacqueline Correa as Mrs. Guerrero, Anna Maria's mother
- Rodney Hicks as Dr. Conrad Brookman, Megan's father
- Sean Hankinson as Dr. Patrick Brookman, Megan's other father
- Paula Pell as Principal Petersen, the principal of West Oak High School.
- Tituss Burgess as Mesmer, a hypnotist who is actually a desperate actor.

== Production ==
On September 27, 2022, it was announced that Disney Branded Television had begun production on a film titled The Slumber Party, based on the book The Sleepover by Jen Malone. Filming began that same day in Atlanta, Georgia.

Veronica Rodriguez was set to direct the film, with Eydie Faye set to write the screenplay. Brian Grazer, Ron Howard, Stephanie Sperber, Jennilee Cummings, Jake Fuller, Tony Hernandez, and John Hodges were set to serve as executive producers.

On June 7, 2023, Tituss Burgess and Paula Pell joined the cast of the film as Mesmer and Principal Petersen, respectively.

== Release ==
The Slumber Party premiered on July 27, 2023, on Disney Channel. It was released on July 28, 2023, on Disney+.

== Reception ==
On the review aggregator website Rotten Tomatoes, 100% of 6 critics' reviews are positive, with an average rating of 6.60/10.

Natasha Alvar of Cultured Vultures described The Slumber Party as a PG-rated take on The Hangover, stating that while the film's premise is not entirely original, it remains entertaining and features several comedic set pieces. Alvar appreciated that the film portrayed its characters as authentic tweens, contrasting with many high school stories that depict teenagers as behaving like adults. The romance subplot between Megan and her crush, Jake Ramirez, was described as sweet and believable. Guillermo Kurten, Blair Marnell, and Rick Marshall of Digital Trends included The Slumber Party in their "Best movies on Disney+ Right Now" list of August 2023, calling it a "delightful coming-of-age comedy."

Tessa Smith of Mama's Geeky rated the film 3.5 out of 5 and highlighted how The Slumber Party was inspired by The Hangover but remained suitable for families, saying it avoids uncomfortable or awkward content, focusing instead on a fun coming-of-age story filled with hilarious adventures and a heartwarming depiction of friendship. Smith noted that the film accurately portrays the dynamics of teen female friendships, with the girls interacting in a genuine and relatable manner. Stephanie Morgan of Common Sense Media gave The Slumber Party a grade of three out of five stars, complimented the depiction of positive messages and role models, citing friendship and the importance of going outside the comfort zone, and described the film as a "sweetly innocent take on The Hangover."

=== Accolades ===
The Slumber Party was nominated for Outstanding Fiction Special at the 3rd Children's and Family Emmy Awards.

== See also ==
- The Hangover
