= Nori Reed =

American stand-up comedian

- Born: Christian County, Kentucky, U.S.
- Occupations: Comedian, writer
- Years active: 2017–present

Nori Reed is an American comedian and writer. She was on Vulture's list of "Comedians You Should and Will Know" in 2021 for her stand-up. She was a writer for the Disney series Raven's Home.

== Life and career ==
Reed grew up in Christian County, Kentucky. She was raised on a farm in a family active in the Pentecostal church. She knew she was queer from adolescence but hid it due to her family's religious beliefs. She enjoyed watching stand-up on television from childhood, and especially liked Mitch Hedberg. Reed attended college in Ohio, during which time she came out. She moved to the Bay Area in 2014 to attend California Institute of Integral Studies, which she left after a year.

Reed began performing stand-up in 2017 in Oakland. She was trained in comedy through a workshop for trans women of color hosted by the organization Peacock Rebellion. She did open mic nights around the city, and went on to co-produce the LGBTQ and women-focused comedy showcase Man Haters, created by Irene Tu and Ash Fisher. Early in her career she opened for Amy Poehler at Outside Lands. Reed relocated to Los Angeles in 2019 to further pursue comedy after signing with Rise Management. New York Magazine's Vulture Editors named Reed to their annual "Comedians You Should and Will Know" list in 2021.

Reed's first screenwriting job was as a staff writer for Raven's Home. She wrote the episode "The Fierce Awakens" featuring Juliana Joel as Nikki, the first trans character on a Disney Channel series. She received a nomination for a 2023 Children's and Family Emmy Award for Outstanding Writing for a Preschool or Children's Live Action Program for Raven's Home. She was named on Out's 2023 List of Most Eligible Bachelorettes. In 2024 she co-hosted the comedy show Trans-It Girls with Hayden Johnson at Elysian Theater.
