= Hollywood Arts =

2026 American teen sitcom

- Promotional poster
- Genre: Teen sitcom
- Created by: Dan Schneider (Note: Schneider created Victorious but is not involved in Hollywood Arts.)
- Based on: Victorious by Dan Schneider
- Developed by: Jake Farrow; Samantha Martin
- Starring: Daniella Monet; Alyssa Miles; Erika Swayze; Emmy Liu-Wang; Peyton Jackson; Martin Kamm
- Country of origin: United States
- Original language: English
- No. of seasons: 1
- No. of episodes: 12

Production
- Executive producers: Samantha Martin; Jake Farrow; Daniella Monet; Jonathan Judge
- Production locations: Vancouver, British Columbia
- Camera setup: Multi-camera
- Production company: Paramount Television Studios

Original release
- Network: Netflix
- Release: October 15, 2026 – present

Related
- Victorious (2010–2013); Sam & Cat (2013–2014)

Hollywood Arts is an American teen sitcom developed by Jake Farrow and Samantha Martin for Netflix. It is a sequel and spin-off to the Nickelodeon series Victorious (2010–2013). Daniella Monet returns as Trina Vega, a struggling actress who takes a job as an unqualified substitute teacher at her old high school. Her students are played by Alyssa Miles, Erika Swayze, Emmy Liu-Wang, Peyton Jackson and Martin Kamm.

Nickelodeon began developing the series in early 2025. Netflix ordered 26 episodes that October, with a second run planned for Nickelodeon and Paramount+. Filming took place in Vancouver from October 2025 to March 2026.

Netflix released the first 12 episodes on October 15, 2026, and in November said the rest of the order would be released as a second season. Reviews were mixed. Several critics thought the show too close to Victorious but liked Monet and the young cast. The series missed Netflix's global weekly top ten, but it reached number one on the kids' chart in 16 countries.

== Premise ==
Struggling actress Trina Vega returns to her alma mater, Hollywood Arts, as an unqualified substitute teacher. There, she both clashes with and inspires a new generation of ambitious, eccentric students.

== Cast ==
=== Main ===
- Daniella Monet as Trina Vega
- Alyssa Miles as Emmy Ward
- Erika Swayze as Jen Z
- Emmy Liu-Wang as Pepper
- Peyton Jackson as Qwest
- Martin Kamm as Oscar Ward

=== Recurring ===
- Yvette Nicole Brown as Helen Dubois

=== Guest stars ===
- Eric Lange as Erwin Sikowitz:
- Matt Bennett as Robbie Shapiro
- Jake Farrow as Rex Powers (voice)
- Kira Kosarin as Sasha
- Taylen Biggs as Miss Sweetly
- Lexi Rivera as herself
- Sofie Dossi as Charli

== Episodes ==
No.	Title	Directed by	Written by	Original release date
1	"Back to School"	Jonathan Judge	Jake Farrow & Samantha Martin	October 15, 2026
Sikowitz announces his retirement as a teacher at Hollywood Arts and Principal Helen announces Trina Vega is going to be the students' substitute teacher, with the students at first thinking Tori Vega was going to be their substitute teacher and it's revealed that after the events of Victorious, Tori went on to become a famous pop star. Here, Trina meets students Emmy, Jen, Pepper and Qwest. Trina confesses to the students that she isn't really qualified to be a substitute teacher and that she's really there to see if any of the students have parents that can help Trina get some Hollywood connections. When Trina finds out none of the students have parents that could help her, she goes to leave, but then Emmy's brother Oscar enters the classroom and talks about how he's holding auditions to find a partner for his routine at the showcase that Friday. Once Trina hears about the showcase, she signs up, getting the last spot, hoping to redeem herself from the last showcase in Victorious, where Tori had to take her place. She recruits Qwest to write her a song and Emmy to be her assistant. Meanwhile, Jen and Pepper, who are "frenemies" who both have a crush on Oscar, sabotage each other to be Oscar's partner in the showcase. Pepper hides Jen's clothes after her ballet practice so she's late to the audition and Jen gives Pepper mints that are secretly poisoned. Once Oscar finds out that Jen poisoned Pepper though, he decides not to partner with her. Emmy gets annoyed with Trina for being bossy and she tells her she'd be a terrible teacher and Trina retorts that Emmy shouldn't go to Hollywood Arts since she doesn't want to perform, she'd rather just work on tech stuff. Trina says that she doesn't take advice from people who don't sing, prompting Emmy to sing. Trina is impressed but Emmy tells her not to tell anyone that she can actually sing. Trina goes to Principal Helen to ask her to add an extra spot to the showcase for Emmy but Principal Helen refuses. Later, at the showcase, once Oscar has no partner and is about to go on stage, Trina tries to convince Emmy to sing with him but she uses a hologram of Oscar himself to sing with him instead. Trina asks Emmy why she won't sing in front of other people and Emmy opens up about how her parents always called Oscar their star, making her not want to try. Before Trina has to go on stage, she gives up her spot to Emmy and she convinces her to sing. Her performance is a success and the next day at school, all the students are trying to talk to her. Trina tells the students that she wants to become their permanent teacher. Principal Helen refused when she asked her but Trina says she's going to try to be a really good substitute teacher for the rest of the week in the hopes that Principal Helen will change her mind. Jen and Pepper are still fighting about what happened the day before at the showcase so Trina takes them to Karaoke Dokie to sing together, hoping they'll make up, which works. Someone who works there offers them a gig to sing there that Tuesday but once Emmy starts singing, the manager of Karaoke Dokie says that he wants Emmy to have the gig instead. Jen and Pepper are frustrated when they find out that the spot for the gig has been taken and they plan to throw stuff at the girl when she's singing, not knowing that the spot has been taken by Emmy. Emmy tries to talk them out of it but is unsuccessful. Meanwhile, Qwest, who is pretending to his dad that he is at Hollywood Arts on a basketball scholarship, is worried when his dad says he's coming to the school to watch a game. Oscar is also struggling, due to Emmy gaining popularity because of her performance at the showcase so he comes up with a plan to pretend to be Qwest's basketball coach so that he can act and get his confidence back and help Qwest keep up his lie. Once his dad shows up, Oscar, in disguise, tells Qwest's dad that he can't watch Qwest play because he's too nervous but that Qwest will invite him to watch him play once he's ready, which Qwest's dad believes. Emmy tells Trina about Jen and Pepper's plan and Trina tells Emmy to dress in disguise and sing so the girls don't know it's her and Trina also shows up to the gig to stop the girls from throwing things at Emmy. During the performance though, Trina accidentally causes Emmy to lose her disguise. Jen and Pepper are angry that Emmy lied to them but Trina convinces them to sing their feelings in a musical improv exercise and by the end, they make up. The next day, Sikowitz comes back to the school once he's heard about Trina being his replacement. At first, he's outraged, but once he sees how much Trina has taught the students and how much they like her, he convinces Principal Helen to keep her as his permanent replacement, to which she finally agrees. Special guest stars: Eric Lange as Sikowitz, Yvette Nicole Brown as Principal Helen Guest stars: Reese Alexander as Odysseus, Jude Wilson as Luke, Ed Witzke as Mikey
2	"Fake It 'Till Ya Make It"	Jonathan Judge	Samantha Martin & Jake Farrow	October 15, 2026
Oscar announces he's joining Trina's class. He pretends it's to keep an eye on Emmy now she's becoming more popular but really it's so he can try and get some of his own popularity back. Then there's an emergency casting call on The Dap (the short-form content app that Emmy created). Emmy confesses that her résumé is basically blank so Trina convinces her to lie about her special skills, adding that she can cry on cue to her résumé. Trina also signs Qwest up for a dance class. Jen and Pepper also start competing to add more special skills to their résumés, where they eventually end up in the hospital and make up. When Qwest shows up to the dance class, he's the only boy, which he's excited about. The next day, after the casting call, it's announced that Emmy has been cast in a commercial where she has to cry on cue, due to Trina submitting her headshot and adding that Emmy can cry on cue to her résumé. Emmy doesn't want to lie and is worried that she won't be able to cry on cue in time for the commercial, which is in a week, but Trina convinces her to try. Meanwhile, Oscar is upset that Emmy is now popular and to cheer him up, Qwest tells him to join the dance class with him. At first, they're both excited to be in the dance class with the girls but then they get wrapped up in their own dancing skills and each other's and start to think they're better than the girls. Trina tries to tell Emmy to think of a sad moment in her life so she can learn to cry on cue but it doesn't work and then they find out that the commercial is now shooting that day instead. Trina and Emmy go to the set but Emmy still doesn't know how to cry on cue yet so Trina gives Emmy fake tears but the director of the commercial notices and storms off the set in anger. Emmy gets angry at Trina for telling her to lie and Trina apologizes but says she just wanted Emmy to gain confidence, causing Emmy to actually get a tear. The director returns to the set less angry and Emmy shoots the commercial now that she's ready to cry. The next day at school though, Trina plays the commercial for the class and Emmy finds out what the commercial was about finger fungus.
3	"Underworld Understudy"	Trevor Kirschner	Sam Becker	October 15, 2026
Oscar is about to join the "100 Curtains Club", which means when a student has performed in 100 plays at Hollywood Arts and he is about to perform in a play that night, which means he will join and also get a special jacket. Trina is also directing the play, because Principal Helen is giving her a good parking spot because of it. But then Oscar suddenly gets a cold so Trina won't let him perform in the play and keeps him in a box. There's no understudy though but since Emmy knows all the dialogue because she was running lines with Oscar, everyone convinces her to act in the play instead, since she will be wearing a mask anyway. Emmy was also gonna run tech but since she's going to act, Trina has to run tech instead. Pepper and Qwest are ushers and to keep them occupied while they wait to usher people out after the play, Qwest brings a ball, but learns that Pepper can't catch so he tries to teach her. Oscar manages to break out of the box and tries to sneak on stage in disguise but is discovered by Pepper and Qwest. Meanwhile, in the play, Trina accidentally presses the trap door button that drops Emmy off the stage, so Jen, who is also acting in the play, improvises a song. Oscar tries to get back to the stage once again and because Emmy can't act in the play anymore, they decide to let Oscar act for the last scene. Trina then accidentally cuts off all the lights so Pepper goes to fix the spotlight but forgets to bring the light bulb with her so Qwest runs after her and she tells him to throw the light bulb and she manages to catch it, restoring the spotlight. Since Oscar got to act in the play in the end, he receives the special jacket and Trina receives her new parking spot.
4	"He Sang She Sang"	Wendy Faraone	Hannah Suria	October 15, 2026
The boys and the girls were arguing about which is better, boy band or girl group. When Trina enters, they let her be the one to decide. Trina immediately chooses boy band because she thinks that girl groups are fake, which makes the girls feel betrayed and satisfies the boys. After watching Oscar and Qwest tawnting, Emmy, Jen and Pepper decide to have a battle of the band in Barstow to figure out which group is better. Emmy finds Trina, reveal her secret as a former member of the girl group called The Girls Next Door but Trina says that she had been kicked out, which made her had a negative opinion about girl groups. Meanwhile, the boys try to find a third member to the group and they found Logan, forming the OQL boy band; for the girls, they tried to show their group We Three Queens are all about friendship and unity. During both groups' practice, Trina has been spying on the girls, giving her a second thought about girl groups. When Emmy finds out about Trina, she said that she had invited Trina's former girl group to The battle of the bands, tells her that they had been feeling bad about their behaviors in the past and would love to come to the contest so Trina agrees to come along. The gang arrive at the destination but immediately discover that it was a Death Metal contest. They confront Tar (Tarantula Venom), find out that the people in this place aren't so scary at all and they are nice people. Later, Trina meets Sasha, McKenzie and Donna, who still make fun of her after all these years. During the performances, Emmy, along with Jen and Pepper, find out that The Girls Next Door were a bunch of mean girls in a fake friendship, trying to impress the public with fake behaviors. After that, the girls found Trina, Emmy apologized to her, and Trina revealed that she doesn't have a lot of friends and all of her friends are all her sister, Tori's friends. The girls then invite Trina to be in their group, becoming We Four Queens and win the contest. Guest stars: Kira Kosarin as Sasha, John Gillich as Tar, Ryan McEwen as Logan, Caitlynne Medrek as Donna, Katrina Teitz as McKenzie
5	"Tori's Magic Locker"	Jonathan Judge	Samantha Martin & Jake Farrow	October 15, 2026
Oscar is jealous of Emmy for taking everything from him, like popularity, opportunities and waffles. Emmy said that it must have been tough for him since she is a performer too but Oscar refuses. Later, Emmy sees Qwest sliding a thank you note to Tori Vega's old locker so she asks him why, and he said that the locker can grant anybody's wishes, like helping Qwest get a date. Jen and Pepper then enter and wish in front of the locker for a spot in the Singdicate. The Singdicate appears and hands both Jen and Pepper their invitation letters. Emmy says that it's because they are talented but the others say it's because of the locker. During class, Emmy breaks character after sees Pepper's overact death, which surprise the class due to the fact that breaking character is a cardinal sin. Trina then hosts a competition to see who can stay in character the longest, with Tori's magic locker as a prize. She gives each person a role: Qwest - a wrestler, Jen - a nun, Pepper - a dog, Emmy - a roast comedian and Oscar - a cowboy. On the next day, the competition begins but Jen is soon disqualified because of Emmy's roast. After that, Pepper arrives at Jen with a letter from the Singdicate saying that they should perform as a duet. Jen is worried about Pepper but Pepper shows that she can both harmonize and stay in character. Meanwhile, Emmy and Qwest arrive at Boba Baby. Emmy is invited to the stage to roast everyone, much to Oscar's disappointment for not being able to sing, while Qwest confronts Mercedes about his lie. Jen and Pepper start to perform; everything goes smoothly until Pepper sees a cat and chases it. Jen found Pepper and said that she is sad because Pepper want to win the locker over her. Pepper then apologizes and is disqualified. At Boba Baby, Qwest decides to take back Mercedes from a man by wrestling him and telling her the truth which makes him disqualified, but he doesn't know that's her brother. For Emmy, after her performance, she realized that she had taken Oscar's chance to get on stage, so she fixed it by complementing everyone instead of roasting, which makes her disqualified. Trina advises Oscar that a win for Emmy isn't a loss for him and they can both be stars. Oscar then gets on stage and perform his song, becomes the winner of the competition. Guest stars: Kaitlyn Cielo as Mercedes, Kurt Long as Nate
6	"Cheese Men"	Trevor Kirschner	Christopher J. Nowak	October 15, 2026
After hearing Emmy and Pepper's song about love, Trina gets irratated, smashs the ukelele and being angry at Qwest and Oscar. She then confesses that her love life is nothing but a failiure. To make Trina feels better, the girls come up with the idea of setting her up with their music writing teacher - Mr. S, which the boys followed instead of their plan which is getting a dog. The gang set up a blind date for them, only for Trina to find out that Mr. S is Robbie Shapiro, her old schoolmate and friend. Trina tells Robbie that she sees him as nothing more than a little brother and walks away after getting "unprepared". Robbie says it's OK but Jen soon finds out that he still has feelings for Trina. In order to get both Trina and Robbie together, the gangs set up a series of rom - com situations like: setting the sunset scene, a full makeover, offering winning tickets but every plan fails. While executing the Cheese Men plan, Emmy, Oscar and Qwest find Robbie's song about Trina so they ask him if he can sing at the open mic check. Immediately, Trina enters and find out the gang's plan. She then asked Robbie not to try so hard for her, which he agrees. At the open mic check, Emmy, Jen and Qwest ask Robbie to sing his song one more time. Robbie sings his song and it makes Trina wonder what her feeling for Robbie and whether she made a mistake by rejecting him. After that, Emmy tells Trina to ask Robbie out but a girl named Kim shows up and asks him out first. Trina sitting at the opposite table, being affected by seeing another girl interested Robbie, so she asks Emmy to be quiet. Emmy receives detention for failing to set up her teachers . Special guest star: Matt Bennett as Robbie Guest star: Jake Farrow as Rex
7	"Cattle Call"	Kira Kosarin	Joe Sullivan	October 15, 2026
Trina decides to take the class on a field trip that is going to a cattle call in Dramada, Northridge. When they arrive, they begin to experience things in the cattle call like smell of hot fish in the air or the line is an 8 to 10 hours wait. While waiting, Oscar is acting protective of Emmy due to a bad experience he had before. He proposes the emergency word "potato" in case he and Emmy get separated and his odd behaviors keep driving Emmy crazy. Trina tricks him and get Emmy to figure out what is going on but due to the loud noise of people practicing line, the two go into a private room, which turns out to be a worker named Tony's closet of hot fish on a grill. Another worker, Randy sees it open and locks it, accidentally trapping Trina and Emmy inside. They try to escape until Trina remembers the emergency word that Oscar gave to Emmy so she shouts repeatedly until Oscar finds them. He then reveals that years ago at his first cattle call, he lost Emmy for 10 minutes because he was too busy learning his line so he was always scared to lose her again, and the two hugged. During that, Qwest goes off to get a snack and meets a girl who asks for some chips if he wants to know her name. He successfully gets the chips after playing some music and singing to get some cash, learning the girl's name is Parthenia and land the part while enjoying the chips. For Jen, she is stuck listening to Trina's acquaintance, Patsy, who tells stories about her death tooth. Jen tries to leave, but decides to stay after hearing Patsy's nephew, who is a filmmaker coming by. Eventually Patsy's nephew is revealed to be a young boy that likes to make videos on his Pear Pad, leading to Jen angrily screaming loudly. Although furious when the part is cast and that she was stuck enduring Patsy's stories about her tooth and flat knees for hours, Trina notes that Patsy's quirks can be used for Jen's comedy sketch audition. As for Pepper, she accidentally starts live-streaming and spots a couple in line fighting, attracting a lot of attention from her viewers. When the couple start to make up, Pepper's viewers encourage her to keep the drama going. When Miwanda leaves, Steve starts crying. Pepper starts to realize the toxicity of social media and ends the stream. She manages to repair the couple's relationship by playing her cello while Steve proposes. Steve and Miwanda hire Pepper to play at their wedding. After everything, the gang regroup and recall what they learned today or got out of the day's events and celebrates. Guest stars: Eileen Barrett as Patsy, Riuh Maria as Parthenia, Sara Erikson as Miwanda, Peter Oldring as Steve
8	"Subway Showdown"	Wendy Faraone	Sam Becker	October 15, 2026
After celebrating Pepper's first television debut in a news report, Jen receives a text message from her agent, telling her that the audition she was supposed to attend has been canceled because the production wants a real mother - daughter pair. Jen's mother isn't available because she's in court, so Trina suggests pretending to be Jen's mother for the audition. Jen agrees, and the two prepare for the audition by making up details about their supposed family history. Meanwhile, Emmy, Oscar and Qwest decide to take the subway (due to the fact that Pear cars are on strike) to a new pizza place called Cheesy Does it. They have never used the subway before so they are mocked by a subway dance crew called The Blue Dragons for attending Hollywood Arts. The Blue Dragons challenge them to a dance battle and they accept. The battle stops when Qwest falls and hurts his butt and that moment was taken and spread quickly by Granny Gripes. Emmy, Oscar and Qwest are then summoned by Hollywood Arts' Social Media Counselor - Miss Sweetly, who is furious that their behavior has tarnished the school's reputation and caused it to lose hundreds of followers so she orders them to fix the situation. Pepper witnesses everything and want to train them. She reveals herself used to be a subway dancer on the LA Metro and broke both of her legs while attempting a dangerous move called the Triple Daisy Spiral. Because of the accident, she is terrified of returning to the subway. Pepper begins to train Emmy, Oscar, and Qwest, teaching them how to stay balanced and perform while the train is moving. At the same time, Jen and Trina attend the audition. Their first attempt goes badly but their arguing makes the kind of authentic mother-daughter tension the casting team is looking for. They receive a callback and are excited about the opportunity. However, seeing both of them getting along so well, the casting team question if they are truly mother and daughter. After that, Jen learns that her mother is still too busy with work to celebrate with her. She starts to explain that she doesn't want everyone to feel sorry for her as a rich girl and had hope that getting this call would make her mother proud. Trina comforts Jen and tells that she is proud of Jen, which makes her touched. Back on the subway, Pepper refuses to join for the rematch because she is still afraid of returning to the place where she broke her legs. Emmy, Oscar and Qwest head to the subway without her and face the Blue Dragons again. The Blue Dragons won after one of them cheats and makes Emmy fall. Just as the situation gets worse, Pepper arrives because she can't leave her friends to fight without her. One of the Blue Dragons recognizes her from her past. Pepper declares that she is even better now and challenges them herself. Pepper performs against the Blue Dragons and eventually attempts the Triple Daisy Spiral, the move that caused her original injury. She successfully completes it and defeats the Blue Dragons, restoring Hollywood Arts' reputation. At the end, eventhough Trina and Jen didn't get the part, they got clothes instead, and the gang start to celebrate. Special guest star: Yvette Nicole Brown as Principal Helen Guest star: Taylen Biggs as Miss Sweetly
9	"Puppet Love"	Trevor Kirschner	Joe Sullivan	October 15, 2026
Special guest star: Matt Bennett as Robbie Guest star: Jake Farrow as Rex
10	"Party Crashers"	Trevor Kirschner	Jake Farrow	October 15, 2026
Guest stars: Alex MacIsaac as Iris, Ayo Solanke as Honeybun
11	"Hollywood Arts & Sciences"	Nathan Kress	Mariah Smith	October 15, 2026
Special guest star: Yvette Nicole Brown as Principal Helen
12	"A Faire to Remember"	Kira Kosarin	Samantha Martin	October 15, 2026
Guest star: Zac Bellward as Mateo

== Production ==
=== Development ===
On February 6, 2025, Deadline Hollywood reported that Nickelodeon was fast-tracking a sequel to Victorious under the working title Hollywood Arts, with Daniella Monet set to return as Trina Vega. The multi-camera comedy was to be written and executive-produced by Jake Farrow and Samantha Martin. Farrow had worked on Victorious and Sam & Cat and had voiced Robbie's puppet, Rex Powers. Martin's credits included Henry Danger and The Fairly OddParents: Fairly Odder.

Dan Schneider, who created Victorious, left Nickelodeon in 2018 and has no involvement in the spin-off. His time at the network was the subject of the docuseries Quiet on Set: The Dark Side of Kids TV, which Vulture and Teen Vogue both mentioned in their coverage. Farrow and Martin confirmed to Teen Vogue that he is not involved.

Farrow said he had hoped to return to the school ever since Victorious ended without a finale in 2013. In March 2024, while Monet was filming a Hallmark Christmas movie, he phoned to ask whether she would revisit Trina. He and Martin, a former colleague from Henry Danger, had already spent several months developing the idea. They chose Trina as the lead because her story was the least defined of the original characters. Before the project became public, Monet contacted each of the original main cast members to ask for their blessing.

Several of those actors commented on a possible return while the show was in development. Victoria Justice told Entertainment Tonight in March 2025 that Tori might "pop in" for an episode. Avan Jogia said he was open to coming back as long as his role was a silly one. Elizabeth Gillies said in April that she would play Jade West again if the story suited the character and was "funny and smart". Matt Bennett told an audience at the University of Massachusetts Amherst that a pilot was being made and that Robbie's return would depend on how it went. In July 2025, Leon Thomas III, who starred as André Harris, expressed interest in reprising his role in a guest appearance.

On October 24, 2025, Netflix announced that it had ordered 26 episodes, to be released on Netflix first and then on Nickelodeon and Paramount+. Deadline tied the sale to the completion of the Skydance–Paramount merger in August, which was followed by the departure of Nickelodeon chief Brian Robbins and other executives, though it described the new leadership's reasons as not entirely clear. Paramount Television Studios, not Nickelodeon, became the production company. Monet, Farrow, Martin and director Jonathan Judge are the executive producers, and Judge directed the pilot.

=== Casting ===
Between February and May 2025, more than 5,700 actors auditioned for the five main student roles. Monet watched self-tapes, joined callbacks over Zoom and took part in chemistry reads with the final three candidates for each part. She has said she put comedic ability ahead of singing and dancing. Nickelodeon had put the cast together before the series moved to Netflix. Alyssa Miles, Emmy Liu-Wang, Peyton Jackson, Erika Swayze and Martin Kamm were announced as the students on October 24, 2025. Yvette Nicole Brown, who played Helen Dubois in Victorious, was revealed in a video the day before in which she and Monet lip-synced lines from the original series.

=== Writing and design ===
Monet insisted that the sets feel the same as the originals. She brought back Tristan Dalley, an assistant art director on Victorious, as production designer. The early episodes carry plenty of nods to the original. Sikowitz's classroom still has the painting of ducks playing poker, the students still eat at the Asphalt Cafe by the Grub Truck, and one episode is built around the legend of Tori's school locker. The pear-shaped phones are gone, partly because nothing fits a pear shape in green-screen shots. The students' social network, The Slap, has become The Dap, a vertical, TikTok-style app that also stands in for talking-head interviews between scenes. Farrow said the humor is a little less mean-spirited than in the original.

The series has covers, original songs and licensed tracks, including a Goo Goo Dolls song. Martin said Netflix and Paramount gave it a generous music budget. The pilot also introduces a new theme song, performed at the school's Big Showcase, as Tori performed "Make It Shine" in the Victorious pilot.

=== Filming ===
The first table read took place on October 14, 2025. Filming took place in Vancouver from October 2025 to March 2026, and the full 26-episode order was shot in that time. A database for working actors, Up To Date Actor, listed a start date of October 20, 2025. Monet, Farrow and Martin lived in the same building as the main cast during the shoot. Martin described the protection of the young actors as "non-negotiable".

== Release ==
Netflix released the first 12 episodes on October 15, 2026. The second half of the order was always meant to follow later. The series will also air on Nickelodeon and stream on Paramount+ after its Netflix run.

=== Viewership ===
Hollywood Arts did not appear in Netflix's global weekly top ten. It did make the official weekly top ten in five countries: the Bahamas, Bolivia, Croatia, Jamaica, and Trinidad and Tobago. According to FlixPatrol, it reached the overall TV top ten in 31 countries but rarely stayed there. In the United States it charted for seven days and peaked at number 8, and in the United Kingdom it charted for four days and peaked at number 7. It did better on the kids' charts, reaching number one in 16 countries and spending 24 days in the US kids' top ten.

=== Season 2 ===
On November 14, 2026, Netflix confirmed a second season as the cast attended the Kids' Choice Awards. The second season is made up of the remaining 13 episodes of the 26-episode order, which had already been filmed, so no new production was needed. Netflix had not announced a release date as of November 15.

== Reception ==
The Express Tribune described the critical response as mixed. In Variety, Aramide Tinubu called the show a "near-carbon copy" of Victorious with exaggerated performances and awkward dialogue. She still thought the cast was talented, singled out Liu-Wang's singing, and found Trina a believable portrait of a thirtysomething still working out her career. She concluded that it would suit preteens who are not ready for young-adult series.

Maddy Casale of Decider wrote that the pilot is full of nostalgia and zaniness, and that the show invites comparisons to Victorious that it cannot win, though she did not call it bad. She praised Monet's performance and said fans of the original should stream it while others could skip it.

Ty'Kira Smalls of Common Sense Media rated the series suitable for ages 8 and up. She said it keeps the wild, whimsical energy and musical numbers of its predecessor, but that the new students resemble the original character types, though they have room to develop. She also advised parents to watch for verbal hostility and some violence.
