= Taylen Biggs =

American child actress, model, and media personality

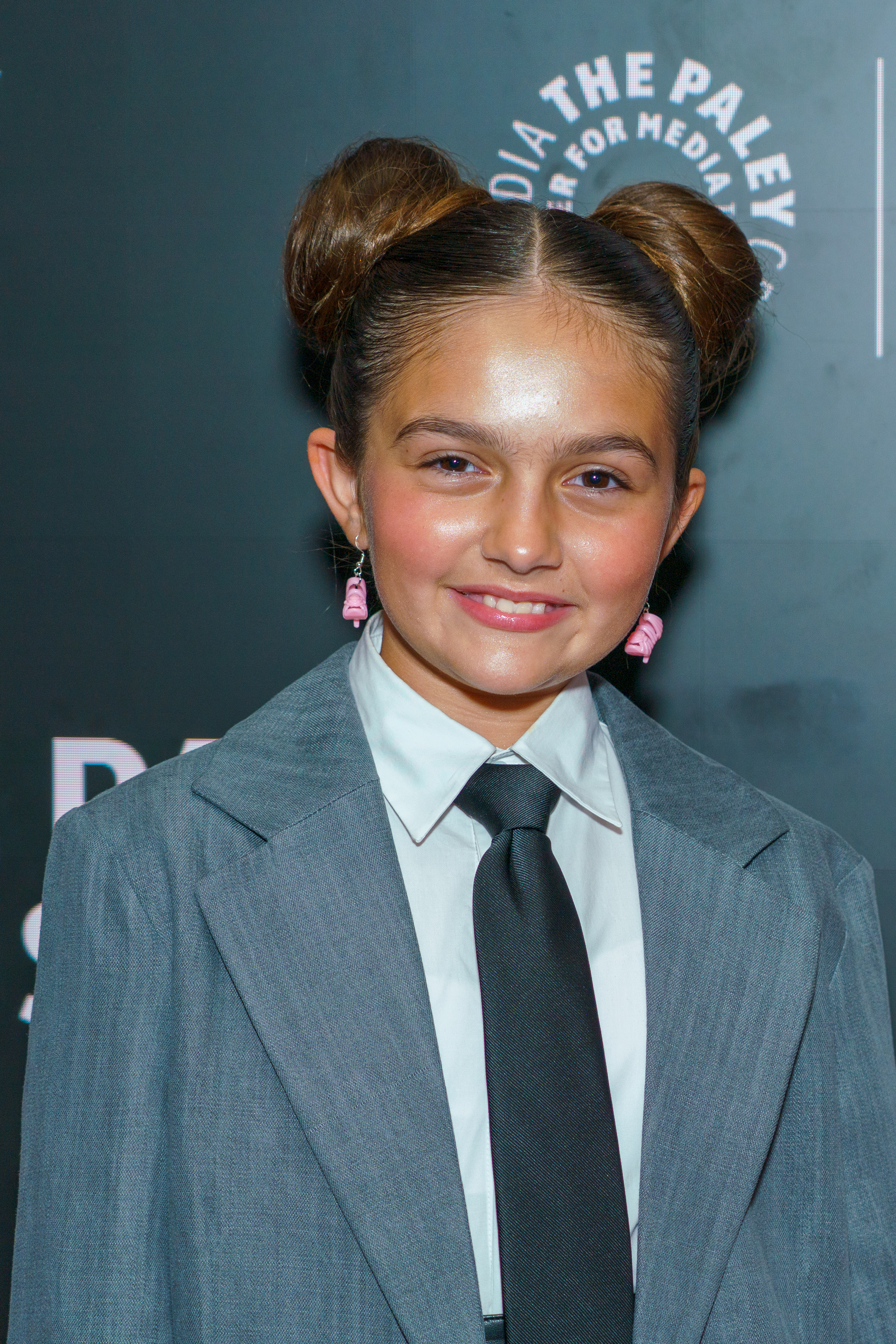
- Biggs at the Paley Center in April 2026
- Born: May 23, 2013 (age 13); Fort Lauderdale, Florida, U.S.
- Occupations: Actress; social media influencer
- Years active: 2014–present

Taylen Biggs (born May 23, 2013) is an American actress and media personality. She gained prominence as a fashion correspondent and celebrity interviewer, conducting red carpet interviews from the age of eight. In 2025, she was named to the inaugural TIME100 Creators list as its youngest honoree.

== Early life and career ==
Biggs was born on May 23, 2013, in Fort Lauderdale, Florida, United States. In 2014, she began modeling at 18 months old, appearing in a photoshoot for the Kardashian Kids clothing line. In 2016, at the age of three, she walked the runway for designer Sherri Hill during New York Fashion Week.

During the COVID-19 pandemic, Biggs pivoted to TikTok, creating fashion commentary content reviewing celebrity red carpet looks. She subsequently became a backstage correspondent for New York Fashion Week and began conducting celebrity interviews at age eight.

== Career ==
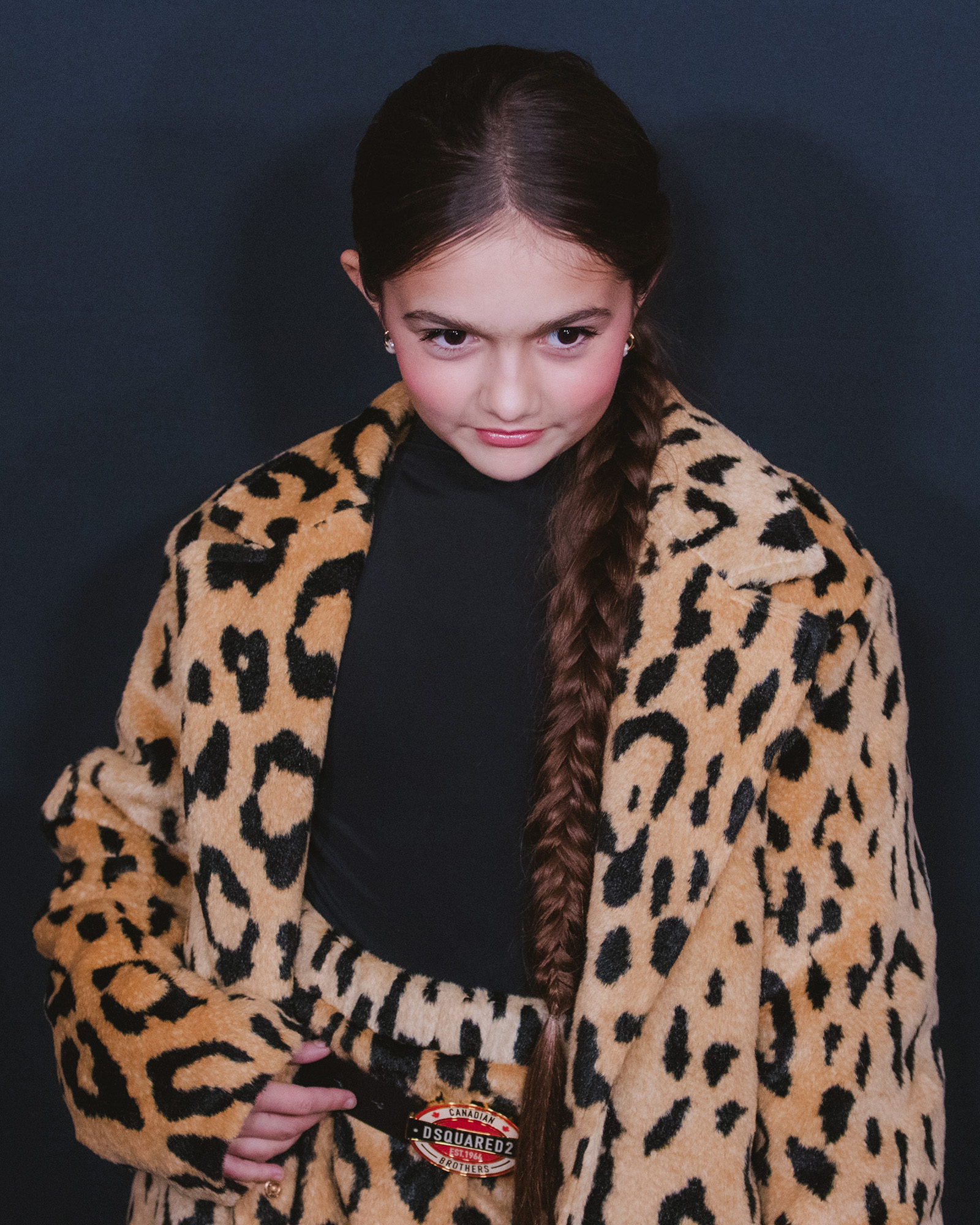
Biggs at the WWD Style Awards in January 2026

=== Media and interviewing ===
Biggs has interviewed celebrities including Dwayne Johnson, Selena Gomez, Ariana Grande, Cardi B, Kris Jenner, and Travis Kelce, among others. Her interviews are regularly shared across social media, where she has amassed a combined following of over three million. In a 2026 interview, she described her approach to interviewing as adapting to each subject's energy level, aiming to create a comfortable atmosphere for her guests.

In December 2024, she signed with Wasserman Creators for talent representation. In July 2025, Time named Biggs to its inaugural TIME100 Creators list, recognizing 100 of the most influential digital creators; she was the youngest person included.

=== Acting ===
Biggs made her acting debut in the Hallmark Channel film Holiday Touchdown: A Chiefs Love Story (2024). She subsequently voiced the character Tailen Smalls in the Walt Disney Animation Studios film Zootopia 2 (2025).

== Filmography ==
Television
Year	Title	Role	Notes
2024	Holiday Touchdown: A Chiefs Love Story		TV Movie
2025	Zootopia 2	(Tailen Smalls)	Voice
2026	Hollywood Arts	Miss Sweetly	Episode "Subway Showdown"
