= Emmy Liu-Wang =

American actress

- Liu-Wang in 2026
- Born: November 20, 2006 (age 20); New York, New York
- Occupation: Actress
- Years active: 2022–present

Emmy Liu-Wang (born November 20, 2006) is an American actress. She played Ivy Chen in the Disney Channel sitcom Raven's Home for the last 2 seasons.In 2023 Liu-Wang played Paige in the Disney Channel Original Movie The Slumber Party. In 2026 Liu-Wang was cast as one of the 5 young leads on the Victorious spinoff Hollywood Arts which premiered on Netflix.

== Early life ==
Liu-Wang is Chinese American, she was born in New York, New York, grew up in Queens, New York. She attended a performing arts high school and began in musical theater, appearing in The Music Man at the Kennedy Center. In a 2023 interview she called theater her first love.

== Career ==
Liu-Wang started her acting career in 2022 by joining the series regular cast of Raven's Home as Ivy Chen for the show's final two seasons. That September, Deadline Hollywood listed the series among her credits when it reported that she had been cast in The Slumber Party, an adaptation of Jen Malone's young adult novel The Sleepover. Filming began in Atlanta, with Veronica Rodriguez directing. In the film, she played Paige, one of two best friends who wake up after a sleepover birthday party with no memory of the night before. It aired on Disney Channel on July 27, 2023, and arrived on Disney+ the next day.

Between February and May 2025, more than 5,700 actors auditioned for the five central roles in Hollywood Arts. Executive producer and Victorious star Daniella Monet watched self-tapes, sat in on callbacks and joined virtual chemistry reads with the final three candidates for each part. Liu-Wang was cast as Pepper, a "silly, airheaded" student described as fiercely loyal to her friends. Her co-stars are Alyssa Miles, Peyton Jackson, Erika Swayze and Martin Kamm. The series was filmed in Vancouver from October 2025 to March 2026. Netflix has ordered 26 episodes, with the first twelve having premiered on 15 October 2026.

== Filmography ==
Television
| Year | Title | Role | Notes | Ref. |
|---|---|---|---|---|
| 2022–2023 | Raven's Home | Ivy Chen | Main role (seasons 5–6) | |
| 2023 | The Slumber Party | Paige | Television film | |
| 2026–present | Hollywood Arts | Pepper | Main role | |

== Audiography ==
Interviews
| Year | Title | Role | Ref. |
|---|---|---|---|
| 2023 | Courageous Nerd | Herself | (Note: Emmy Liu-Wang Interview: The Slumber Party, Raven's Home (Video interview). Courageous Nerd. 2023 – via YouTube.) |
