= The Woman in the Yard =

2025 film by Jaume Collet-Serra

- Theatrical release poster
- Directed by: Jaume Collet-Serra
- Written by: Sam Stefanak
- Produced by: Jason Blum; Stephanie Allain
- Starring: Danielle Deadwyler; Okwui Okpokwasili; Peyton Jackson; Russell Hornsby
- Cinematography: Pawel Pogorzelski
- Edited by: Timothy Alverson; Krisztian Majdik
- Music by: Lorne Balfe
- Production companies: Blumhouse Productions; Homegrown Pictures
- Distributed by: Universal Pictures
- Release dates: March 27, 2025 (Australia); March 28, 2025 (United States)
- Running time: 87 minutes
- Country: United States
- Language: English
- Budget: $12 million
- Box office: $23.3 million

The Woman in the Yard is a 2025 American psychological horror film directed by Jaume Collet-Serra and written by Sam Stefanak in his feature film screenwriting debut. The film stars Danielle Deadwyler, Okwui Okpokwasili, Peyton Jackson, Russell Hornsby and Estella Kahiha.

The Woman in the Yard was released in the United States by Universal Pictures on March 28, 2025. It received mixed reviews from critics and has grossed $23 million.

== Plot ==
Ramona is a widowed mother who was injured in a car accident that also killed her husband David. She cares for their two children Taylor and Annie, but she is strict and emotionally distant from them. A mysterious woman draped in black appears in the front yard claiming that "Today's the day." After a brief and disturbing conversation with the Woman, Ramona advises her children to stay away from her. Taylor is not convinced by his mother's story and tells her she needs to get rid of their unwanted guest or he will. This results in Ramona losing her temper and throwing a mug at their kitchen floor out of anger and sending Taylor to his room. He disobeys her, however, and pulls up a chair in front of the window overlooking the yard where the Woman is still sitting.

Ramona assures Taylor she will handle the situation and make the Woman leave. The Woman mysteriously moves closer to the house, which is noticed by the whole family. The Woman uses shadow magic to attack their dog, Charlie, who goes missing as a result and is presumed dead. Ramona experiences strange occurrences after the Woman appears. After a power cut at their home that results in the family having to eat the food in the freezer and refrigerator, namely ice cream, Ramona notices Charlie is quiet and goes outside to look for him. She finds the chain used to tether Charlie to his dog house is broken and Charlie's collar is also missing.

Ramona tries to keep the kids away from the Woman, who seems to know the true circumstances of David's death. Ramona convinces the kids that he was driving and caused the accident, but it was actually Ramona herself who was driving and crashed the car after an argument with David about her unhappiness with her life, marriage, and family. The Woman then seems to be using a dark power to antagonize the family and seemingly take the kids away. Ramona surrenders herself to the Woman and agrees to send the kids away for safety if she is going to die.

The Woman is revealed to be a physical manifestation of Ramona's psyche and only appeared because Ramona was praying for her. When pressed what she prayed for, she claims it was strength to carry on after David's death, when in reality, she was praying for the strength to end her life because of her depression. The Woman intends to help her commit suicide, convincing Ramona that the children are better off without her.

After Ramona says goodbye to her kids, the Woman leads her into the barn, assisting Ramona to point the rifle at herself. The children return along with Charlie, and the Woman disappears. They ask if the Woman will come back, and Ramona assures them she will be ready. As they embrace, the camera pans into the house, revealing a painting Ramona had not finished that shows her and the Woman's faces together with Ramona's name spelled backward.

== Cast ==
- Danielle Deadwyler as Ramona
- Okwui Okpokwasili as the Woman, a mysterious figure covered in black clothing
- Russell Hornsby as David, Ramona's husband
- Peyton Jackson as Taylor, Ramona's son
  - Chad "C. Pitt" Pitter as adult Taylor
- Estella Kahiha as Annie, Ramona's daughter

== Production ==
The film's screenplay was first written in 2020 by first-time screenwriter Sam Stefanak as The Man in the Yard. It went on to appear in that year's edition of the annual "Black List" of most-liked unproduced screenplays.

In February 2024, it was announced that the film was put into development at Universal Pictures and Blumhouse. Jaume Collet-Serra had been hired to direct from Stefanak's script, which went through more revisions and plot changes. Danielle Deadwyler cast in the lead role. In April 2024, it was reported that Okwui Okpokwasili and Russell Hornsby had joined. In May, Peyton Jackson and Estella Kahiha joined the cast in undisclosed roles.

Principal photography began on April 26, 2024. The film was the first major production to be shot at Athena Studios in Athens, Georgia. Filming also took place in nearby Bostwick, Georgia.

== Release ==
The Woman in the Yard was released in the United States on March 28, 2025. It was previously scheduled for release on January 10, 2025, before being briefly removed from the release schedule.

== Reception ==
=== Box office ===
In the United States and Canada, The Woman in the Yard was released alongside A Working Man, The Penguin Lessons, and Death of a Unicorn, and was projected to gross around $5 million from 2,842 theaters in its opening weekend. The film made $3.7 million on its first day, including an estimated $875,000 from Thursday night previews. It went on to overperform and debut to $9.4 million, finishing in fourth. In its second weekend, the film made $4.5 million (dropping 52%), finishing in fifth.

=== Critical response ===
On the review aggregator website Rotten Tomatoes, 41% of 85 critics' reviews are positive, with an average rating of 5.3/10. The website's consensus reads: "The Woman in the Yard has plenty of spooky promise in its premise and a committed performance from Danielle Deadwyler, but the story's heavy-handed metaphor leaves little room for scares or surprise." Metacritic, which uses a weighted average, assigned the film a score of 51 out of 100, based on 17 critics, indicating "mixed or average" reviews. Audiences polled by CinemaScore gave the film an average grade of "C–" on an A+ to F scale.

Rolling Stone's David Fear wrote, "Like a particularly concise, purposefully elliptical short story, The Woman in the Yard quickly milks this beguiling, WTF-is-going-on-here? scenario for all the dread it's worth, while not necessarily being in a hurry to fill folks in on the full 411 regarding this sticky situation." Wendy Ide of The Observer gave the film 3/5 stars, writing, "The inexorable, creeping chill of this uncanny game of What's the time, Mr Wolf? dissipates almost entirely, though, during a convoluted third act in which the story ties itself in knots and the audience becomes too baffled to remember to be scared." Frank Scheck of The Hollywood Reporter said the film "belies its disingenuously bland title with its considerable thematic ambitions. The film doesn't fully live up to them, but it deserves credit for trying something different in an oversaturated, frequently exploitative genre."

Tim Robey of The Daily Telegraph gave the film 2/5 stars, saying, "[Jaume Collet-Serra] can lay on industry-standard jump scares, get the sound designers to goose us, and weave in some cool shadow-play that certainly manages to get noticed in the absence of any real plot. But there's little here to keep us up at night – or from forgetting all about it by tomorrow." Inverse's Hoai-Tran Bui wrote, "The Woman in the Yard is not a total failure as a horror movie, thanks to Collet-Serra's directorial skills and a genuinely terrific central performance from Deadwyler. But, despite its strong start and intriguing premise, it ultimately falls apart in its final minutes, thanks to its confused, overplotted narrative."
