= Ashley August =

American actress, spoken word artist, and poet

- Occupations: Actress, spoken word artist, poet

Ashley August is an American actress, spoken word artist, and poet perhaps best known for such films and television series as The Punisher, The Kindergarten Teacher, Orange Is the New Black, Dream School and Meeting Molly.
