= Erika Swayze =

Canadian actress

- Occupation: Actress

Erika Swayze is a Canadian actress. Since 2026, she has starred in the Victorious spin-off Hollywood Arts.

She has also appeared in TV shows such as School Spirits,Accused, and Workin' Moms.
