= Knut Åsdam =

Norwegian artist

- Born: 28 August 1968
- Education: Whitney Independent Study Program, Jan van Eyck Academie
- Occupation: Visual artist, installation artist, video artist, photographer
- Website: www.knutasdam.net

Knut Åsdam (born 1968) is a Norwegian artist who currently lives and works in Oslo. For more than fifteen years he has actively contributed to the international art scene with exhibitions, publications and broadcasts. He established his international career through the art scene in New York, where he lived for ten years, after finishing studies at Goldsmiths, London (1987–92) and at the Jan Van Eyck Academie in Maastricht (1992–94).

Åsdam has exhibited at established venues like Tate Britain, Venice Biennale, Museum of Modern Art New York, Moderna Museet and Musée d'Art Moderne de la Ville de Paris, and his film works are screened at international film festivals. His latest projects include the hybrid film/installation work Oblique (installation), first exhibited at the European art biennial Manifesta 7, in Trentino 2008.

== Artistic overview ==
Identity, space and place are recurring concerns in Åsdam's approach, which explore the way we live in the city today, as well as the thoughts, references, desires and conflicts that drive us. His investigation of the usage and perception of public urban spaces, including their structures of political power and authority, takes the diverse form of audio, film, video, photography and architecture. The images and sounds that he diffuses in his exhibitions often resonate together in the spaces that he builds for them, allowing the viewer to experience them as real locations.

Though expressed in very diverse forms, Åsdam's main interests remain consistent; they concern the manner in which each individual constructs and negotiates his or her identity while bounded by the rules and organizations of contemporary society. Four categories are essential to Åsdam's work: "Speech", "Living", "Sexualities" and "Struggle".

Speech is often theatrical and poetically displaced in Åsdam's film, video and audio works, and point to how subjectivity is formed through speech acts — either through actual speech or through other forms of self-articulation like clothing, gestures and routines. Many of his works express an interest for the performative aspects of speech and for how meaning is temporarily stabilized through repetition, inscription and reinscription.

Living is descriptive of the integration of architecture, place and social dynamics, for instance how a park functions within a city, or, how our everyday lives are conditioned by rapid economic and political changes. The works also display a strong interest for the interplay of fantasy and narration in everyday experience of the environment.

Sexualities refers to the plurality of sexual and gendered experience, fundamental for Åsdam's construction of characters. His work witnesses a sensitivity to the instability of the self that expands on the merits of queer theory and feminism, and simultaneously invites the viewers own desires and presuppositions in the building of narrative and desire.

Struggle is vital, not only in a political sense, but also as a way of understanding the contestation and affirmation of ‘speech’ (subject formation), ‘living’ (the meaning of the everyday) and ‘sexualities’ (the meaning of our bodies) in our everyday, involving both psychological and social processes.

== Works ==
In the cinematic field, Åsdam has developed a new kind of cinema, using the resources of spatial and place-oriented discourses from the Fine Arts context as a strategy within film. In the 21-minute award-winning film Filter City (2003), two women whose exact relationship we do not know (are they friends, lovers or simple acquaintances?) wander around a city – a city that is a character in its own right. The film evolves to create a symbiosis between these women who are lost in their relationship to others and to themselves, but also lost in the city, which lives its life without them.

The 13 minute Oblique (2008) is an articulation of identity in transition. The entire film was shot on a train moving through a continuous mass built from cities and their adjoining regions. Newly built outer areas around the cities, construction sites, institutional and office buildings, transitory places, between growth and collapse, marked by quasi-contradictory processes of economic progress and development of slums. On the train coach itself, a targeted but sometimes absurd narrative plays itself out as a linguistic reaction to the time and place.

The 17 minute Finally (2006) deals with questions or effects of history and violence, and explores the boundaries between narrative film and the discussion of place and history. The film is shot within a historic setting in Salzburg, Austria. The film is oriented around questions of history and violence. It researches the area between narrative film and the analysis of space within contemporary art. The three main characters in Finally fight violently and repeatedly in the film, but there is not much in the narrative that seems to trigger it. It seems rather to be the reaction to, or even demand of, a place in manners that are both historic and contemporary.

The work Oblique (installation) (2008) is a hybrid environment blurring the border between the film Oblique (2008), and an architectural installation, creating a space that is a marker of borders and ideas of urban property and simultaneously a space to disappear to see the film. Often screening the films within corresponding environmental installations, Åsdam's works raises a perception of bodily co-existence with the film's characters and enhance the import of his pieces, which are made not only to be seen but also to be heard.

In a series of installations, The Care of the Self (1999–2007), Åsdam has created nighttime parks with a dark lush interior in an architecture of trees, plants, grass and flowers. Here Åsdam blurs the psychological and physical boundaries between the viewer and the nighttime park of the city; the temporary space for teenage hangouts, drug trafficking and sexual cruising. At the same time as representing a temporary space of release, the nighttime park is also a part of the very mythology and narrative of the city.

Åsdam's photographs involve a similar experience. In the large format printed photographic series Psychasthenia 10, (2000–2001), and the slides installation Psychasthenia 10 series 2 (2001), we are confronted with nighttime photographs of apartment buildings in different western cities. As the low level of light blend the colors of the images, background and foreground intermixes in the viewer's perception. The modern buildings in the photographs, all from between 1959 and 1992, do not clearly indicate the economic or class status of their inhabitants, but are offered to us for subjective interpretation through our personal fantasies, prejudices and personal experiences of the city.
