= Peyton Jackson =

American actor

- Occupation: Actor

Peyton Jackson is an American actor. He has starred in films such as Respect (2021), The Woman in the Yard (2025), and The Drama (2026). Since 2026, he has also starred in the Victorious spin-off Hollywood Arts.
