= Martin Kamm =

American actor

- Occupation: Actor
- Years active: 2023–present

Martin Kamm is an American actor. He is known for his role of Harry Osborn on the television show Web of Spider-Man (2023–2025). As of 2026, Kamm is known for playing Oscar Ward in the Netflix sitcom Hollywood Arts.

== Career ==
Kamm plays Oscar Ward in the Netflix sitcom Hollywood Arts. Hollywood Arts premiered on October 15, 2026.

== Filmography ==
Year	Title	Role	Notes
2023–2025	Web of Spider-Man	Harry Osborn	Main role
2026–present	Hollywood Arts	Oscar Ward	Main role

== Discography ==
==== EPs ====
2026: Listen to the Radio
