= Raven's Home =

American television series

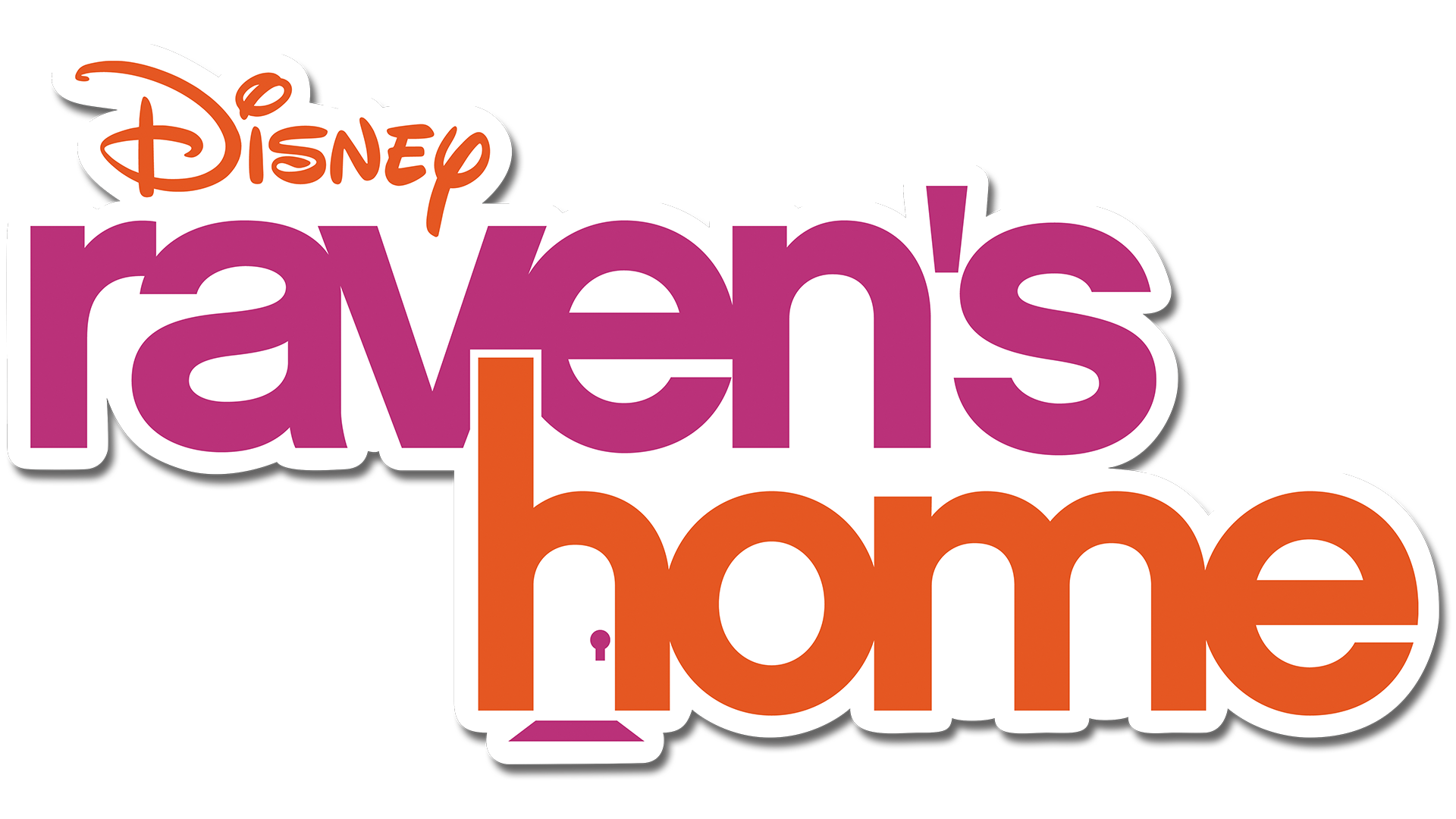
- Genre: Family sitcom
- Created by: Michael Poryes; Susan Sherman
- Developed by: Jed Elinoff & Scott Thomas
- Starring: Raven-Symoné; Issac Ryan Brown; Navia Robinson; Jason Maybaum; Sky Katz; Anneliese van der Pol; Mykal-Michelle Harris; Felix Avitia; Emmy Liu-Wang; Rondell Sheridan
- Theme music composer: Andy Love; Joacim Persson; Johan Alkenäs
- Composers: Bert Selen; Bud'da
- Country of origin: United States
- Original language: English
- No. of seasons: 6
- No. of episodes: 122 (list of episodes)

Production
- Executive producers: Jed Elinoff & Scott Thomas; Raven-Symoné; Michael Feldman; Dava Savel; Eunetta T. Boone; Warren Hutcherson; Alison Taylor
- Producer: Julie Tsutsui
- Cinematography: Bryan Hays; John Simmons
- Camera setup: Multi-camera
- Running time: 22–24 minutes
- Production companies: It's a Laugh Productions; Done Deal Productions; Funny Boone Productions

Original release
- Network: Disney Channel
- Release: July 21, 2017 – September 3, 2023

Related
- That's So Raven (2003–2007)

Raven's Home is an American family sitcom television series developed by Jed Elinoff and Scott Thomas that aired on Disney Channel from July 21, 2017 to September 3, 2023. The series stars Raven-Symoné, Issac Ryan Brown, Navia Robinson, Jason Maybaum, Sky Katz, and Anneliese van der Pol for its first four seasons. Raven-Symoné and Issac Ryan Brown returned for the fifth season, alongside Mykal-Michelle Harris, Felix Avitia, Emmy Liu-Wang and Rondell Sheridan.

Based on the characters created by Michael Poryes and Susan Sherman, the series is a spinoff of That's So Raven, the second spinoff from that series after Cory in the House. The series centers on Raven Baxter, a divorced mother of preteen twins Booker and Nia, living with her childhood best friend Chelsea and her son Levi in Chicago, Illinois.

== Premise ==
Best friends Raven and Chelsea, both divorced single mothers, are now raising their children in an apartment together in Chicago. Their house is turned upside down when they realize that Raven's son Booker has inherited the same psychic abilities as his mother.

In the fifth season, Raven and Booker temporarily relocate to Raven's hometown of San Francisco to care for Raven's father Victor after he suffers a mild heart attack. While Raven tries to get her father back in good health, Booker must navigate his mother's old school with the help of some new friends and his younger cousin Alice.

== Episodes ==
Season	Episodes	Originally released	
Season	Episodes	First released	Last released
1	13	July 21, 2017	October 20, 2017
2	21	June 25, 2018	November 30, 2018
3	26	June 17, 2019	May 3, 2020
4	19	July 24, 2020	May 21, 2021
5	25	March 11, 2022	December 2, 2022
6	18	April 9, 2023	September 3, 2023

== Cast and characters ==
=== Main ===
- Raven-Symoné as Raven Baxter, the single mother of twins Nia and Booker, who works as a fashion designer for dogs. It is revealed that prior to the series, Raven had gotten divorced from Devon Carter, an ex-boyfriend from high school, and now lives with Chelsea and her son in Chicago. Raven possesses psychic abilities, able to glimpse "visions" of the future. She decides not to tell her children about her visions as she believes they would not understand. However, in "The Falcon and the Raven – Part Two", she reveals to the children that she is psychic. In the second season, Raven is working as a driver for the transportation business Scüt. Additionally, she starts working on her own fashion line called "Ravenous Fashion".
  - Raven-Symoné also portrays Delroy Baxter, the country cousin of Victor, the father of Betty Jane, the grandfather of Alice, and the first cousin of Raven once removed.
- Issac Ryan Brown as Booker Baxter-Carter, Raven's son and Nia's twin brother, who has inherited his mother's psychic abilities. After he gets his first vision at school, he decides to keep his newfound powers a secret, especially from his mother as he thinks she would not believe him, unaware that his mother is also psychic. Eventually, Booker tells Levi, Nia and Tess about his psychic abilities and makes them promise to help him keep them a secret. Also, in "The Falcon and the Raven – Part One", he reveals to his mother and Chelsea that he has visions.
- Navia Robinson as Nia Baxter-Carter (seasons 1–4), Raven's daughter and Booker's twin sister. She initially does not believe her brother's psychic abilities, insisting it is one of his made up stories. When her brother has a vision of Nia getting hit by a boxing bag that later becomes true, she realized that her brother was telling the truth and helps keep his power a secret alongside their friends. After season four, it is revealed that Nia is in Guatemala building homes for the poor.
- Jason Maybaum as Levi Grayson (seasons 1–4), Chelsea's son. He is very mature for his age and often acts as the parent in his relationship with his mother. Levi is Booker's best friend and is aware of his psychic abilities.
- Sky Katz as Tess (seasons 1–4; special guest star season 6), Nia's street-wise best friend who lives in the same building as the rest of the family; her last name is revealed to be O'Malley in "Oh Father, Where Art Thou?" She is an avid basketball player. Due to previously believing in psychics, Tess quickly believed Booker about being one and vowed to help keep his powers a secret.
- Anneliese van der Pol as Chelsea Grayson (seasons 1–4; special guest star season 5), Raven's somewhat dim-witted and sweet best friend and the mother of Levi. It is revealed that prior to the series, Chelsea made a substantial sum of money from an infomercial product she invented called the "Schmop", but her fortune was stolen by her husband Garrett Grayson. Afterward, Garrett was arrested for tax evasion and ended up having an affair with the federal agent who arrested him. Chelsea subsequently divorced him upon reclaiming some of her money and moved in with Raven. While living with Raven, Chelsea often tries to cook for the family, which goes horribly awry. In season 2, she builds a vegetable garden on their building's rooftop. In the third season, Chelsea is seen temporarily working on a cruise ship she went on during the second season while becoming a life coach.
- Mykal-Michelle Harris as Alice Baxter (seasons 5–6), the niece of Raven who lives with Victor in San Francisco to keep him company and to attend a school for geniuses
- Felix Avitia as Neil (seasons 5–6), Victor's neighbor and Booker's classmate at Bayside High School
- Emmy Liu-Wang as Ivy (seasons 5–6), Victor's neighbor and Booker's classmate at Bayside High School
- Rondell Sheridan as Victor (seasons 5–6; guest season 2), the father of Raven and the maternal grandfather of Booker and Nia. He works as a chef and flies out to Chicago to help Raven while Chelsea is away on a Caribbean cruise. In the fifth season, he has a mild heart attack and Raven returns to San Francisco with Booker to take care of him.

=== Recurring ===
- Jonathan McDaniel as Devon Carter (seasons 1–4), Raven's ex-husband and the father of Booker and Nia who works as a meteorologist. He was Raven's boyfriend in high school and is now aware of Raven's abilities. After the two of them separated, Devon relocated to Dallas, Texas.
- Anthony Alabi as Coach Spitz (seasons 1–3), the gym teacher at George Washington Carver Community School
- Jenna Davis as Sienna (seasons 2–3), a popular and influential student at George Washington Carver Community School
- Dylan Martin Frankel as Mitch (season 2), the son of 352 Hauser Avenue's new owner Richard Moseley who runs the apartment while his father is busy
- Laya DeLeon Hayes as Zeena (season 2), a student at George Washington Carver Community School who is the leader of the Red Hot Chili Steppers dance group and has an improving relationship with Nia and Tess
- Max Torina as Ramon (seasons 3–4), Tess's boyfriend
- Ernie Grunwald as Lazlo (seasons 5–6), the head chef at the Chill Grill
- Marissa Reyes as Cami (seasons 5–6), Alana's daughter and Booker's love interest
- Adrienne Bailon as Alana (season 5), Raven's teenage arch nemesis, and now principal of Bayside High
- Juliana Joel as Nikki (seasons 5–6), Raven's unqualified and unpaid assistant who only took the job in order to be reinstated in her father's trust fund

=== Notable guest stars ===
- Brian George as Dr. Sleevemore, a clairvoyant and telekinetic scientist who helped out Raven with two of her psychic problems during her high school days. He later helped out Booker when he froze mid-vision.
- Kylie Cantrall as Jasmine, Dr. Sleevemore's granddaughter and co-worker
- Miranda May as Lou, the current proprietor of Camp Kikiwaka
- Mallory James Mahoney as Destiny
- Raphael Alejandro as Matteo
- Will Buie Jr. as Finn
- Shelby Simmons as Ava
- Scarlett Estevez as Gwen
- Israel Johnson as Noah
- Anne-Marie Johnson as Donna Cabonna, a fashion designer who was Raven's old mentor back in the original series
- T'Keyah Crystal Keymáh as Tanya, Raven's mother and the maternal grandmother of Booker and Nia who was in England pursuing a higher education
- Giovonnie Samuels as Betty Jane, the country cousin of Raven who is the mother of Alice and the daughter of Delroy

== Production ==
On August 14, 2015, Raven-Symoné and her former co-stars were reunited in an appearance on The View. T'Keyah Crystal Keymáh and Rondell Sheridan were not present, but were mentioned by the cast. A pilot for the series was announced by Disney Channel on October 27, 2016, and Raven-Symoné also announced that she was departing as co-host of The View later in 2016 in order to work on the series full time. On November 14, 2016, it was announced that Anneliese van der Pol would reprise her role of Chelsea Daniels in the series as a divorced mother who is raising a son, Levi, and moves in with Raven. Disney Channel officially greenlit the series, with the title of Raven's Home, on April 4, 2017. Executive producers Jed Elinoff and Scott Thomas serve as showrunners and head writers, with Raven-Symoné also on the writing team as an executive producer. The series is filmed at Hollywood Center Studios.

Disney Channel renewed the series for a second season on October 10, 2017, which began filming in November 2017. Additionally, starting with the second season, Michael Feldman and Dava Savel replaced Jed Elinoff and Scott Thomas as showrunners. Both Savel and Feldman served as writers and producers on That's So Raven. On September 28, 2018, it was announced that a musical episode of the series would premiere on October 12, 2018.

Following a silent renewal, on November 28, 2018, it was announced that Eunetta T. Boone would be taking over as showrunner and executive producer for the third season. On March 21, 2019, it was announced that production on the third season was temporarily shut down, following the death of Eunetta T. Boone. On May 10, 2019, it was announced that the third season would premiere on June 17, 2019.

On October 16, 2019, it was announced by Disney Channel that the series was renewed for a fourth season, with production scheduled to begin sometime in 2019. Additionally, Alison Taylor joined the series as an executive producer.

On June 29, 2020, it was announced that Raven's Home and Bunk'd would have a special crossover event on July 24, 2020.

On October 1, 2021, it was announced by Disney Channel that the series was renewed for a fifth season. Raven Symoné and Isaac Ryan Brown would return for the season; however, Navia Robinson, Jason Maybaum, Sky Katz, and Anneliese van der Pol would not return. Additionally, newcomers Mykal-Michelle Harris, Felix Avitia, and Emmy Liu-Wang joined as Alice, Neil and Ivy, respectively, and Rondell Sheridan would return as Raven's father Victor Baxter. Production of the fifth season commenced in fall 2021. Adrienne Bailon also returned as Alana Rivera, Raven's high school bully in the original series. On February 10, 2022, it was announced that the fifth season would premiere on March 11, 2022.

On June 21, 2022, Entertainment Tonight announced that Keymáh would reprise her role as Tanya Baxter in the season five finale. This marks her first time portraying the character since 2005 in her final appearance in the season 3 That's So Raven episode, "Food For Thought".

Raven-Symoné announced during a panel at Disney's D23 Expo on September 10, 2022, that the series was renewed for a sixth season. On March 23, 2023, it was announced that the sixth season would premiere on April 9, 2023.

On May 15, 2024, it was announced that Raven's Home had ended after six seasons and that a spin-off pilot titled Alice in the Palace was ordered. According to Mykal-Michelle Harris, after the pilot of Alice in the Palace was filmed, Disney Channel decided not to pick it up for a full series.

== Broadcast ==
The world premiere of Raven's Home aired immediately after the premiere of Descendants 2 on the Disney Channel on July 21, 2017. The first season concluded on October 20, 2017. The second season premiered on June 25, 2018, and concluded on November 30, 2018. The third season premiered on June 17, 2019, and concluded on May 3, 2020. The fourth season premiered on July 24, 2020, and concluded on May 21, 2021. The fifth season premiered on March 11, 2022, and concluded on December 2, 2022. The sixth season premiered on April 9, 2023, and concluded on September 3, 2023.

== Reception ==
=== Critical response ===
Raven's Home has received positive reviews. Writing for The Post, Georgia Davis appreciated the pilot for "maintain[ing] the charm and energy" of the original, praising Raven and Chelsea's characterizations, as well as the performances of the child actors. Davis concluded, "It might be too early to tell, but it seems Raven's Home is on the right path for success." Emily Ashby of Common Sense Media wrote that "That's So Raven fans will find plenty more of what they loved about the original series in this sharply written sitcom that plays up the woes of adulting and tween trials in a surprisingly great balance."

=== Ratings ===
Viewership and ratings per season of Raven's Home
Season	Episodes	First aired		Last aired		Avg. viewers (millions)
Season	Episodes	Date	Viewers (millions)	Date	Viewers (millions)	Avg. viewers (millions)
1	13	July 21, 2017	3.50	October 20, 2017	1.27	1.50
2	21	June 25, 2018	0.96	November 30, 2018	0.75	0.83
3	26	June 17, 2019	0.63	May 3, 2020	0.40	0.50
4	19	July 24, 2020	0.72	May 21, 2021	0.33	0.37
5	21	March 11, 2022	0.24	December 2, 2022	0.16	0.17
6	18	April 9, 2023	0.09	September 3, 2023	0.11	0.13

=== Awards and nominations ===
Year	Award	Category	Recipient	Result	Ref.
2018	NAACP Image Awards	Outstanding Children's Program	Raven's Home	Nominated	
2018	Daytime Emmy Awards	Outstanding Performer in a Children's Program	Raven-Symoné	Nominated	
2018	BMI Film, TV & Visual Media Awards	BMI Cable Television Music Awards	Raven's Home	Won	
2019	Kids' Choice Awards	Favorite Funny TV Show	Raven's Home	Nominated	
2019	Kids' Choice Awards	Favorite Female TV Star	Raven-Symoné	Nominated	
2019	Daytime Emmy Awards	Outstanding Costume Design/Styling	Raven's Home	Nominated	
2020	Casting Society of America	Children's Pilot and Series (Live Action)	Danielle Aufiero and Amber Horn	Nominated	
2021	NAACP Image Awards	Outstanding Children's Program	Raven's Home	Nominated	
2022	Children's & Family Emmy Awards	Outstanding Directing for a Multiple Camera Program	various	Nominated	
2023	NAACP Image Awards	Outstanding Children's Program	Raven's Home	Nominated	
2025	Children's and Family Emmy Awards	Outstanding Lead Performer	Raven-Symoné	Nominated	
