= YouTuber film =

Films made by YouTubers

A YouTuber film, also known as a YouTuber movie, is a feature film in which one of the stars or producers is a YouTuber.

After YouTube was founded by Chad Hurley, Steve Chen, and Jawed Karim in 2005, and Google buying the site in November 2006 for US$1.65 billion, the term YouTuber would become a popular way to characterize people who made videos on the platform. One of the earliest YouTuber films to retrospectively get the label was the unanimously panned 2010 film Fred: The Movie starring Lucas Cruikshank. Other early YouTuber films include: Not Cool (2014) starring Shane Dawson and Smosh: The Movie (2015) starring the sketch comedy-duo, Ian Hecox and Anthony Padilla from Smosh. There have also been independent YouTuber films such as Angry Video Game Nerd: The Movie (2014). Most of the early YouTuber films had a poor critical reception.

From 2022 onwards, YouTuber films would become more mainstream and received more positive reviews from critics. They include Talk to Me (2022) by the RackaRacka channel, Obsession (2025) made by the sketch comedy-duo Curry Barker and Cooper Tomlinson of the channel "that's a bad idea", and Backrooms (2026) by Kane Pixels. Other YouTuber films would also receive a mixed reception, like Shelby Oaks (2024) by Chris Stuckmann and Markiplier's Iron Lung (2026). Overall, YouTuber films have a mixed reception. There is a consensus that early YouTuber films have been low quality, until the release of Talk to Me.

== Background ==
YouTube is an American online video-sharing platform headquartered in San Bruno, California, founded by three former PayPal employees—Chad Hurley, Steve Chen, and Jawed Karim—in February 2005. YouTube would become more popular after Google bought the site in November 2006 for US$1.65 billion, since which it operates as one of Google's subsidiaries.

The term YouTuber means a content creator and influencer who uploads or creates videos on the online video-sharing website or app YouTube, typically posting to their personal YouTube channel. The term was first popularized in the 2006 Time Person of the Year issue.

== History ==
=== Early films (2010–2019) ===
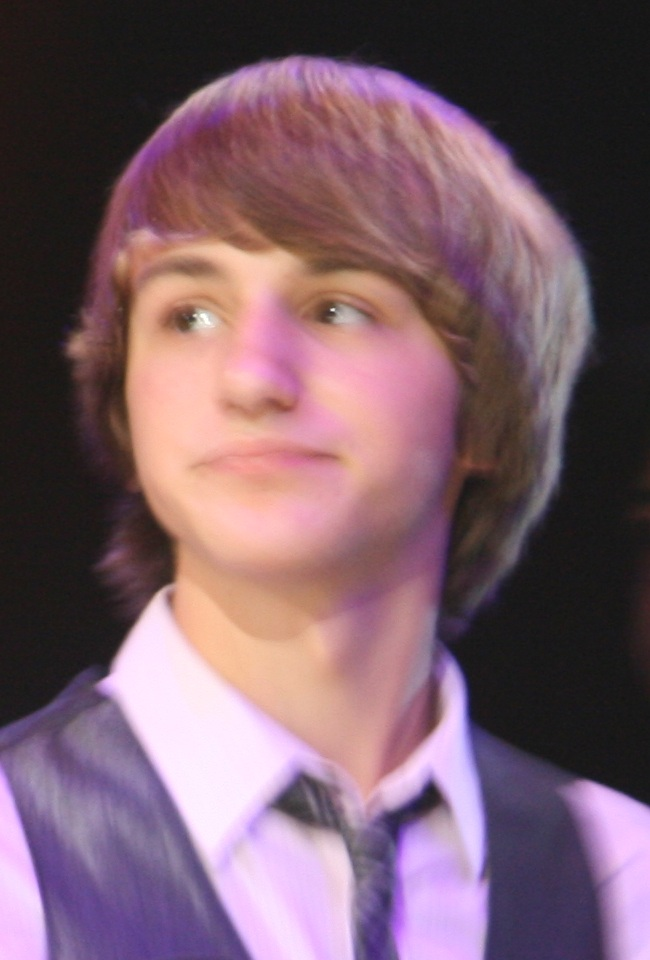
Lucas Cruikshank stars in one of the first YouTuber films, Fred: The Movie (2010)

One of the earliest YouTuber films to retrospectively get the label was the 2010 film Fred: The Movie starring Lucas Cruikshank. Cruikshank is an American YouTuber and actor who created the character Fred Figglehorn and the associated Fred series for his channel on the video-hosting website YouTube in late 2006. In April 2009, his channel had over one million subscribers, making it the first YouTube channel to do so. In December 2009, Cruikshank filmed Fred: The Movie, which aired on Nickelodeon in September 2010. Critical reception for Fred: The Movie was predominantly negative and was panned by critics. It has a 0% rating on Rotten Tomatoes. Nickelodeon created three more films about Fred Figglehorn. Fred 2: Night of the Living Fred aired on October 22, 2011, and a third movie in 2012 called Fred 3: Camp Fred both aired on Nickelodeon.

Erin Brady of SlashFilm cites three films from 2010 to 2012, by Channel Awesome, an American YouTube production company as also being "YouTube-related movies". In 2012, the film Smiley included many YouTubers, such as Shane Dawson and Toby Turner. The film was released on October 12, 2012, to largely negative reviews. In 2014, Shane Dawson, who was one of the first people to rise to fame on YouTube after he began making videos in 2008, directed, produced, edited, and starred in the romantic comedy film Not Cool. The film grossed $36,026 in the US against an $800,000 budget. On Rotten Tomatoes the film has an approval rating of 14% based on seven reviews. It is Dawson's only directed feature film. James Rolfe, an American YouTuber, is best known for creating and starring in the comedic retro gaming web series Angry Video Game Nerd in 2004. Following its success, Rolfe released an Independent feature-length film based on the series in 2014 titled Angry Video Game Nerd: The Movie. The film was also given the label of a YouTuber film. It received mixed reviews from critics, with praise for its soundtrack, visual effects, and faithfulness to the web series, but criticism for the pacing, script, and length.

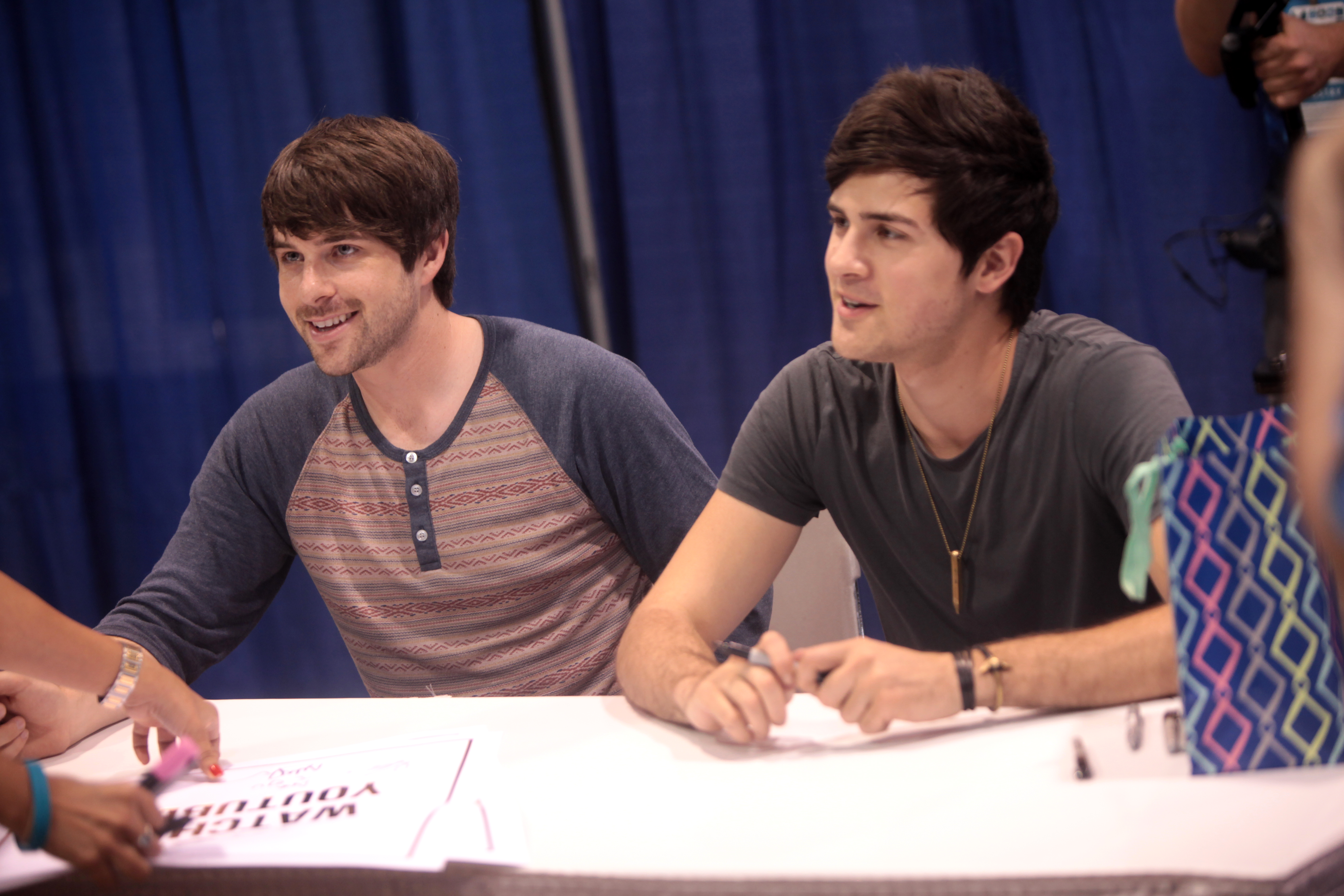
Ian Hecox and Anthony Padilla from Smosh: The Movie (2015)

Smosh is an American YouTube sketch comedy-duo, Ian Hecox and Anthony Padilla. They began posting videos on Smosh in 2005 and quickly became one of the most popular channels on the site. On September 18, 2014, it was announced that a feature-length film starring the duo was in development by AwesomenessFilms; it would later be titled Smosh: The Movie, and was released direct-to-video on July 24, 2015, by 20th Century Fox Home Entertainment. Directed by Alex Winter from a screenplay by Eric Falconer and Steve Marmel, it stars both Hecox and Padilla as fictionalized versions of themselves, alongside fellow YouTube personalities Jenna Marbles, Grace Helbig, Harley Morenstein, Mark Fischbach, Dominic Sandoval, and Shane Dawson appearing in the Unrated version. The film received negative reviews. In January 2016, members of RedLetterMedia, a Milwaukee-based YouTube film and TV review channel, released Space Cop, a straight-to-DVD science fiction action comedy, making use of crowdfunding by fans. It received poor reviews, but RedLetterMedia has enjoyed continued success on YouTube.

In June 2016, Swedish filmmaker David F. Sandberg directed the film Lights Out. It was based off his most popular 2013 YouTube short film of the same name. Lights Out grossed $148 million against a budget of $4.9 million and received positive reviews from critics. Marlow Stern of Variety named Sandberg "the first YouTuber to break into Hollywood as a horror filmmaker." In September 2016, English YouTuber KSI and South African YouTuber Caspar Lee, starred in the direct-to-video teen comedy Laid in America. The film received negative reviews. In October 2016, the American influencer and entrepreneur, Logan Paul, was the main lead in the thriller The Thinning. Adi Robertson of The Verge gave a negative review of the film, describing it, in comparison to other films about teenagers forced into a deadly competition, as "remarkable simply for being such a bad take on the formula." A 2018 sequel The Thinning: New World Order was released less than a year after Paul's suicide forest controversy.

The Fine Brothers are an American YouTube channel founded by brothers Benny and Rafi Fine. In December 2017, the brothers released the on-demand feature film F the Prom, to widely negative reviews. In January 2018, YouTube comedian, musician and filmmaker Bo Burnham released his debut film Eighth Grade. It premiered at the 2018 Sundance Film Festival and was picked up by the independent company A24. The film was a critical and commercial success, grossing $13.5 million domestically. In February 2019, the action comedy film Airplane Mode was released. It was directed by David Dinetz and Dylan Trussell, and written by Dinetz, Trussell, Logan Paul and Jake Paul. Logan Paul portrays the main character. Critical reception for Airplane Mode was predominantly negative.

=== Mainstream success (2022–present) ===
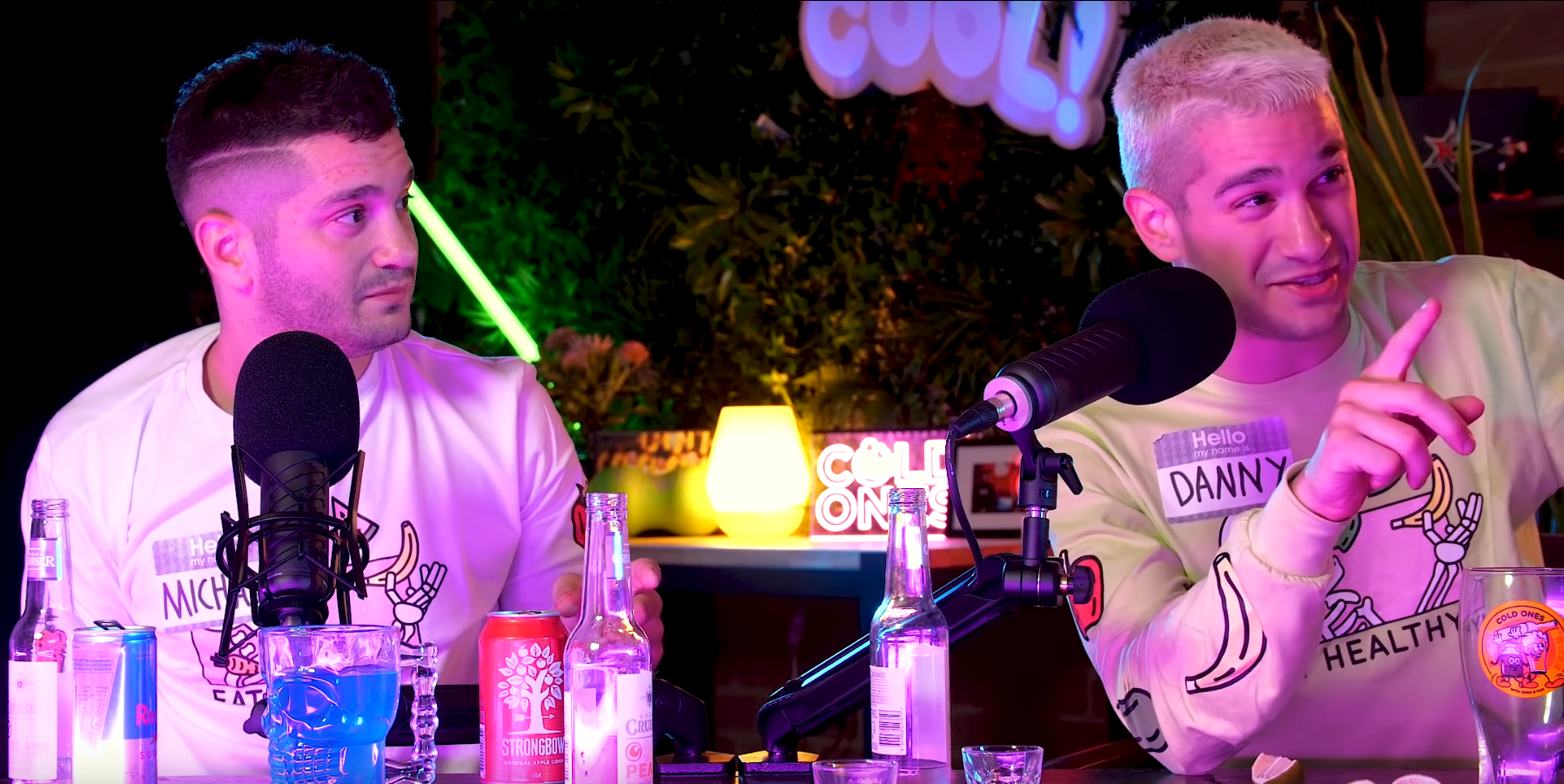
Danny and Michael Philippou made one of the first YouTuber film to receive a positive reception from critics

From 2022 onwards, YouTuber films would become more successful and receive more positive reviews from critics. Excluding Lights Out and Eighth Grade, the first YouTuber film to receive a positive reception from critics was the 2022 Australian supernatural horror film Talk to Me. The film was directed by the Australian twin YouTubers Danny and Michael Philippou, of the channel RackaRacka. The channel is known for being "VFX-focused", and has 6.74 million subscribers and over a billion views. Talk to Me sold to numerous international distributors at the 2022 Cannes Film Festival. It had its debut in a preview screening at the Adelaide Film Festival on October 30, 2022, the closing night of the festival. The film had its international premiere at the 2023 Sundance Film Festival in its midnight lineup. A24 acquired the rights to distribute the film in the United States. The film received positive reviews from critics and grossed $92 million worldwide against a production budget of $4.5 million. Following Talk to Me, the Philippou brothers directed another horror film titled Bring Her Back, in 2025.

During the 2019 Fantastic Fest, American YouTuber and film critic Chris Stuckmann pitched his spec script for Shelby Oaks, as a potential directorial debut for himself, to Paper Street Pictures producer Aaron B. Koontz, who agreed to help develop the film. In 2022 Stuckmann started an independent crowdfunding campaign through Kickstarter to create the film Shelby Oaks. By March 2022, it had become the most-funded horror film on the platform after raising $650,000. The campaign crossed the $1 million mark from 11,200 backers by March 25. The film was released theatrically in the United States by Neon on October 24, 2025, to mixed reviews from critics and grossed $8 million at the box office. In February 2026, the Canadian comedy film Nirvanna the Band the Show the Movie had a limited release in theaters. It was directed by Matt Johnson and written by Johnson and Jay McCarrol. It is based on their 2007 web series, Nirvana the Band the Show. It received critical acclaim, with it making $4 million at the box office, and it getting a 97% on Rotten Tomatoes. Brayden Caldwell of Trillmag said that it was the most acclaimed films of the year, and one of the best for YouTuber movies.

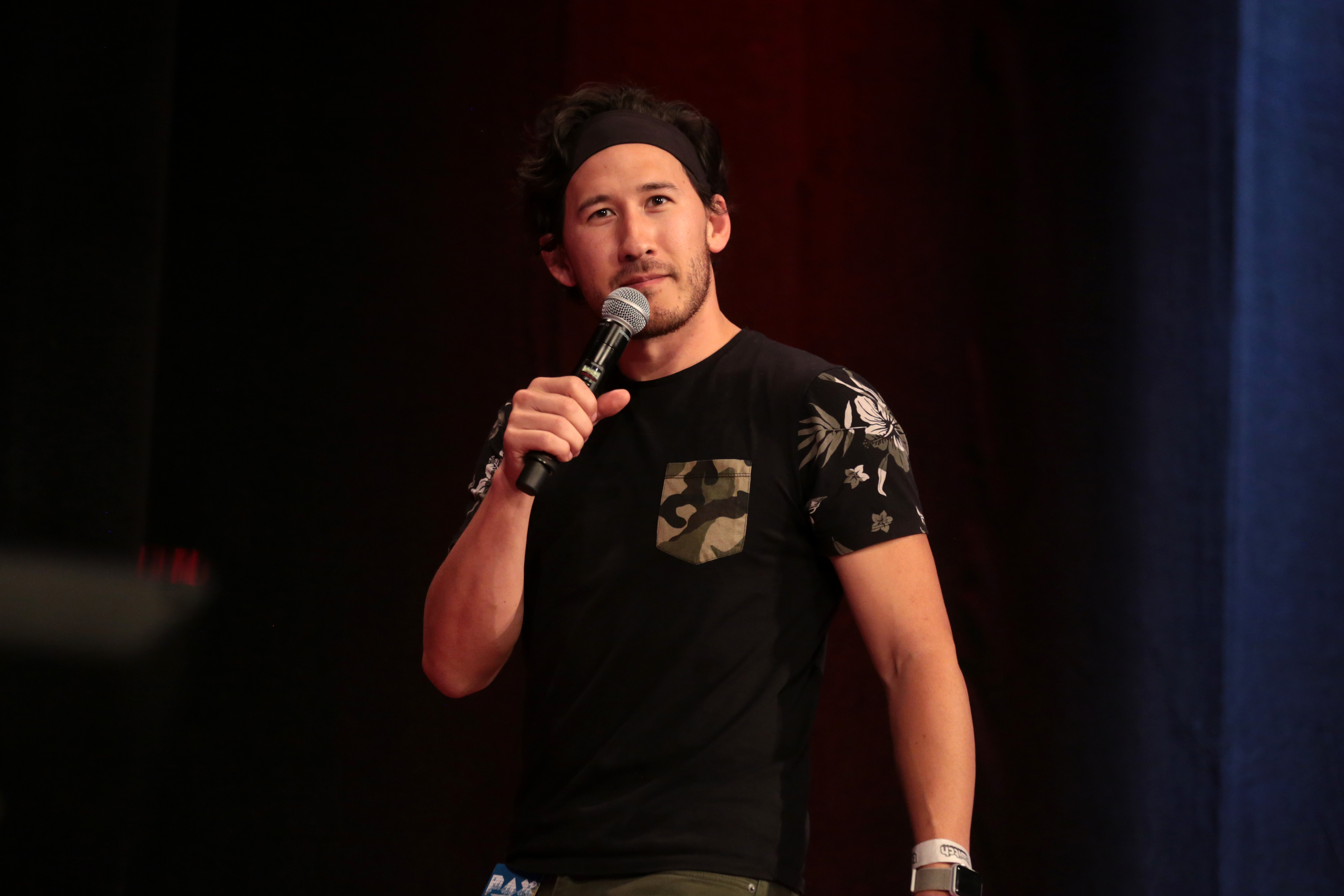
Markiplier directed, edited, write, starred in, and funded the science fiction horror film Iron Lung.

In 2023, it was announced that the American YouTuber Mark Fischbach, known professionally as Markiplier, would directed, edited, write, starred in, and funded the science fiction horror film Iron Lung. It is based on the 2022 video game by David Szymanski. Markiplier is best known for his Let's Play videos, with his channel getting over 38 million subscribers. On December 5, 2025, Markiplier published the release date trailer and opened ticket pre-sales. Despite an initial slated release in only 60 independent US theaters, Markiplier encouraged fans to request it directly from their local theaters, leading to a grassroots word of mouth campaign reaching Cinemark, AMC, and Regal Entertainment Group, among several others. Iron Lung released on January 30, 2026, and was shown in 4,161 theaters worldwide. The film received mixed reviews from critics. Reviewers with praised Iron Lung for its visual approach and atmosphere, while others criticized its slow pacing and Markiplier's performance. It was a box-office success, grossing $51 million worldwide.

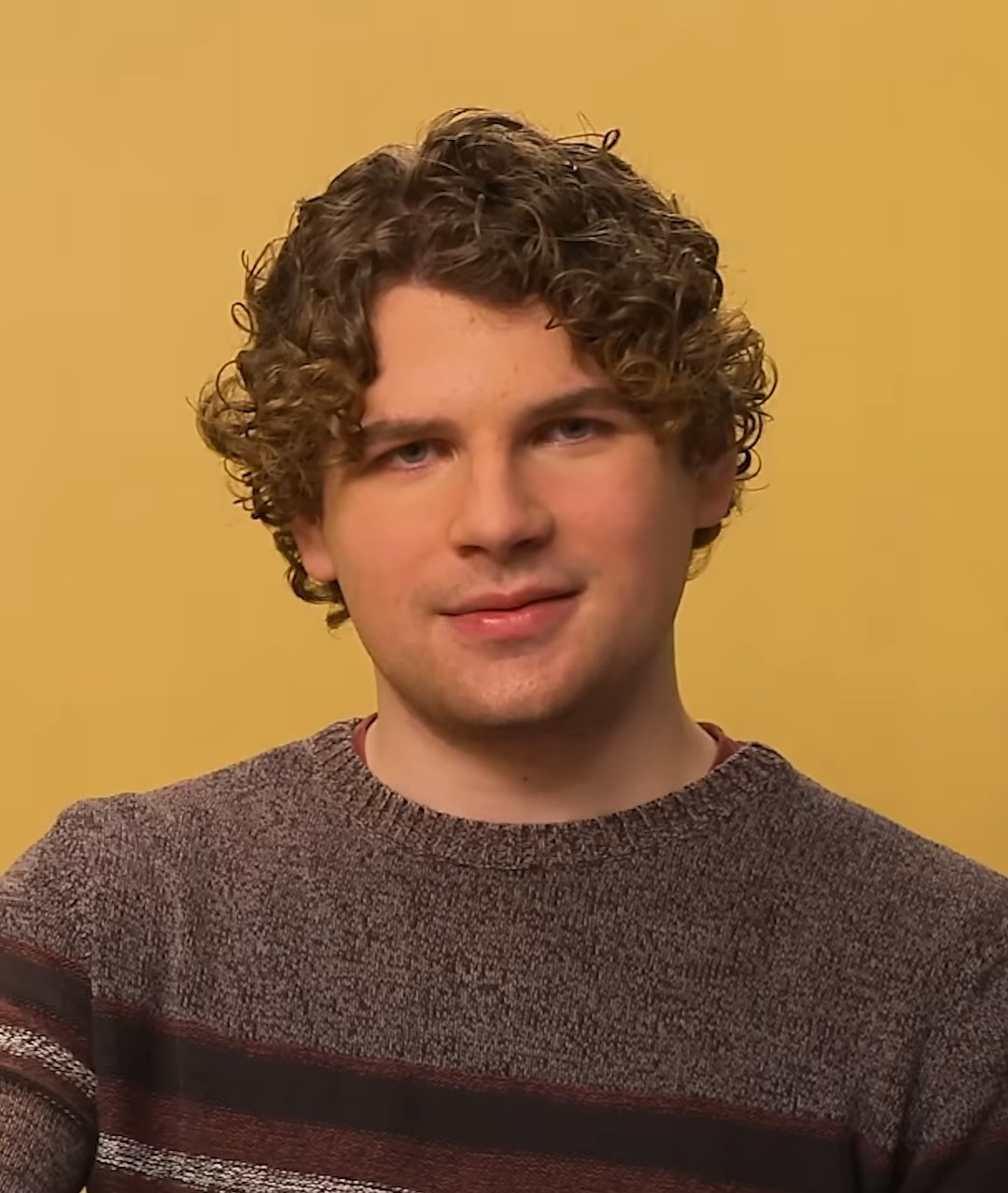
Curry Barker (left) and Kane Parsons (right) both made some of the most acclaimed YouTuber films

Curry Barker and Cooper Tomlinson, are an American comedy duo best known for their YouTube sketch comedy channel "that's a bad idea". In 2023, Barker wrote and directed the horror short film The Chair and uploaded it to YouTube, where it was watched more than 10 million times. In August 2024, Barker directed the $800 found footage horror film Milk & Serial. Despite spending a year trying to get distribution for the film, Barker ultimately decided to release the full film on YouTube. The film went viral, leading to a representation deal with United Talent Agency in early 2025. Film producer James Harris of Tea Shop Productions reached out to Barker to adapt it into a feature, at which point Barker instead pitched him on his horror film Obsession. In September 2025, Obsession premiered at the Toronto International Film Festival. Jason Blum came on board as an executive producer under Blumhouse Productions. Obsession was theatrically released in the United States in May 2026. A critical and commercial success, it grossed $225.2 million worldwide from a budget of $750,000, becoming the tenth-highest-grossing film of 2026. On the review aggregator website Rotten Tomatoes, 95% of 260 critics' reviews are positive. Inde Navarrette received critical acclaim for her performance.

American YouTuber Kane Parsons known professionally as Kane Pixels, began publishing the web series Backrooms, based on the creepypasta of the same name, to his YouTube channel in January 2022. The series went viral, receiving tens of millions of views and a positive critical reception. On February 6, 2023, A24 announced that they were working on a film adaptation of the Backrooms based on Parsons's videos, with Parsons directing. Roberto Patino was set to write the screenplay but was replaced by Will Soodik. Patino, James Wan, Michael Clear from Atomic Monster, Shawn Levy, Dan Cohen, and Dan Levine of 21 Laps were to produce. Backrooms was released in the United States on May 29, 2026. Backrooms received positive reviews from critics and has grossed $213 million worldwide, becoming A24's highest-grossing film to date and making Parsons the youngest filmmaker to reach number one at the American box office.

== Reception ==
Overall, YouTuber films have had a mixed reception. There is a consensus that early YouTuber films had been low quality, until the release of Talk to Me. Erin Brady of SlashFilm said that before Talk to Me, "YouTuber movies aren't particularly successful in winning this niche fanbase, let alone general audiences." She said that while the history of YouTuber films has been largely been negative, there is potential. Brady also noted that it is rare for a YouTuber to direct the film themself. She goes on to say that Talk to Me is a "very different type of movie from the aforementioned ones." Brady names it as one of the best YouTuber films. In February 2026, Liana Seale of 34th Street Magazine mainly reviewed the film Iron Lung in their article. She said that YouTubers should no longer be dismissed as outsiders to the film industry, with several successful filmmakers having emerged from the platform, including Danny and Michael Philippou, Dan Trachtenberg, and Kane Parsons.

In March 2026, Brayden Caldwell of Trillmag wrote an article dedicated to the topic of YouTuber films. Caldwell criticized early YouTuber films like Fred: The Movie and Smosh: The Movie calling them "failed attempts to major hits". He says that "arguably one of the most important moments in all of this" is when Danny and Michael Philippou released Talk To Me. Caldwell names 2026 as "the most successful year for YouTuber movies of all time." In May 2026, Brian Stelter of CNN said the success of Backrooms and Obsession, could "change the future of moviemaking", especially with Gen Z filmmakers, since Curry Barker and Kane Parsons were in their 20s when they made their films.

== See also ==
- Bob Thunder: Internet Assassin
- Cult film
- House on Eden
- Internet Famous
- Lists of films considered the worst
- List of YouTube Premium original programming
- List of YouTube videos
- Ryan's World the Movie: Titan Universe Adventure
