= Jenna Marbles =

American YouTuber and comedian (born 1986)

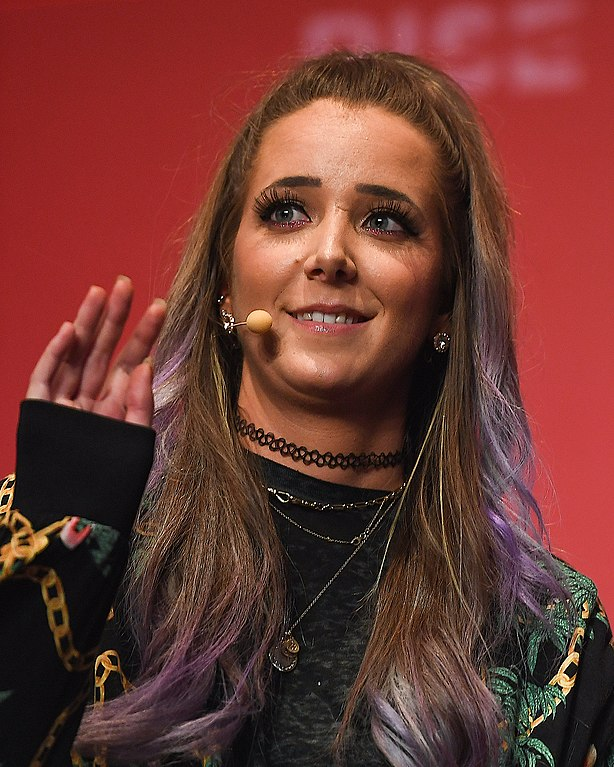
- Marbles in 2018
- Born: Jenna Nicole Mourey; September 15, 1986 (age 40); Rochester, New York, U.S.
- Education: Suffolk University (BS); Boston University (MEd)
- Occupations: YouTuber, comedian
- Years active: 2010–2020 (on indefinite hiatus)
- Spouse: Julien Solomita (m. 2022)

YouTube information
- Channel: JennaMarbles
- Genres: Comedy; vlog
- Subscribers: 19.4 million
- Views: 1.88 billion
- Last updated: July 5th, 2026

Jenna Nicole Mourey (born September 15, 1986), better known as Jenna Marbles, is an American former comedian and YouTuber. Over the span of ten years, her YouTube channel has accumulated approximately 1.8 billion video views and, at its peak, over 20 million subscribers. After apologizing for a series of accusations involving content in her older videos, Marbles announced her indefinite hiatus from the platform in 2020.

== Early life and career ==
Jenna Nicole Mourey was born on September 15, 1986 in Rochester, New York, where she was also raised. Marbles attended Brighton High School in the Rochester suburb of Brighton, New York, and graduated in 2004. She then moved to Boston, Massachusetts, where she played softball while earning a Bachelor of Science in psychology at Suffolk University. She then earned a Master of Education in sport psychology and counseling at Boston University.

In the summer of 2010, Marbles was sharing a three-bedroom apartment in Cambridge, Massachusetts. She supported herself by bartending, working at a tanning salon, vlogging, and go-go dancing at nightclubs. That year, Marbles started her career with Barstool Sports, where she wrote for their female-oriented site StoolLaLa. She left the publication in 2011.

== YouTube career ==
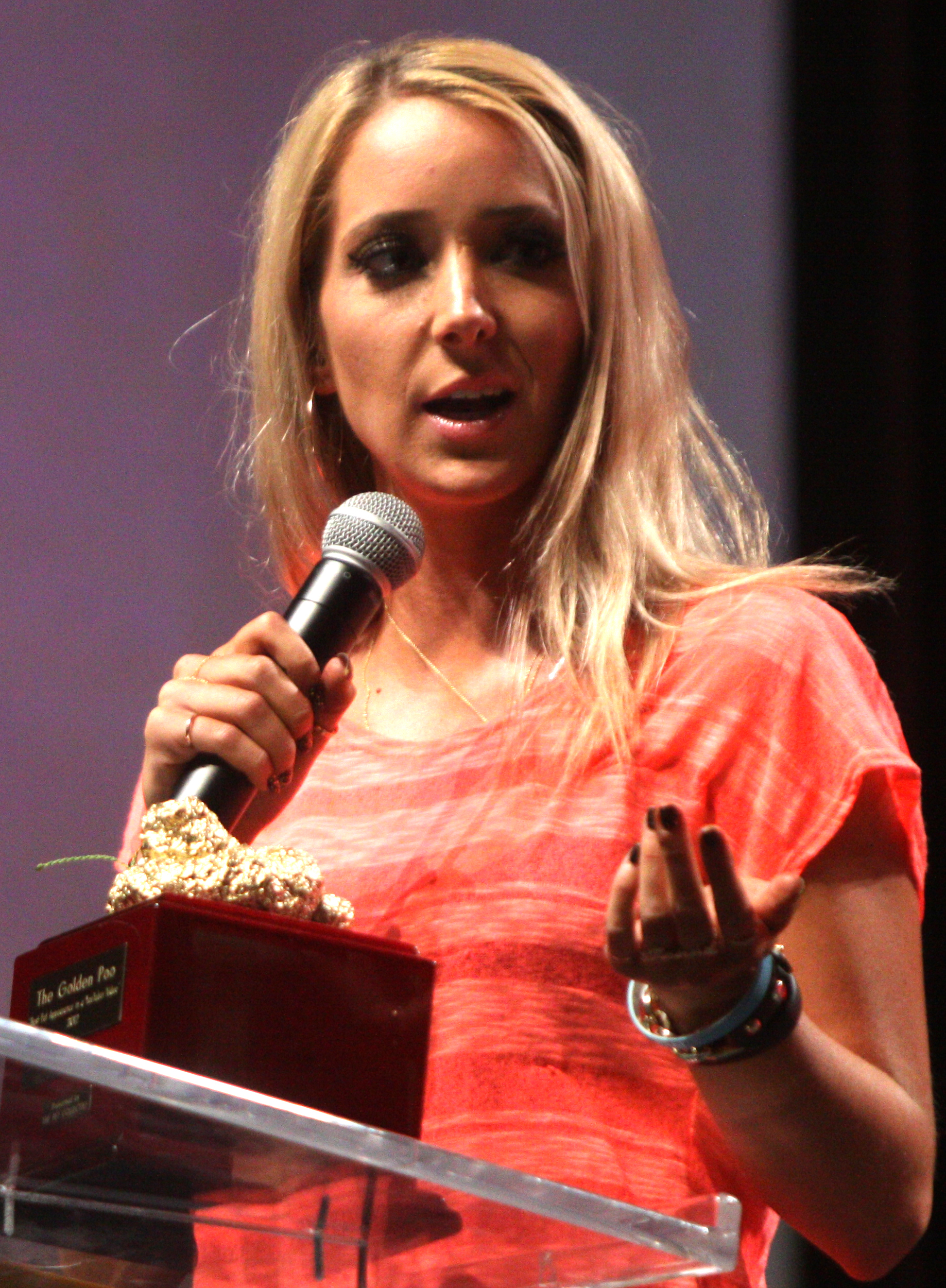
Marbles at VidCon in 2012

Marbles began her YouTube channel in 2010. That year, her comedy video "How to Trick People into Thinking You're Good Looking" quickly gained traction on the platform, gaining around 5.3 million views in its first week. As of April 2026, the video has over 73 million views.

In August 2011, her video "How to Avoid Talking to People You Don't Want to Talk To" was featured in The New York Times and ABC News. In the video, she said, "I'm sick and tired of guys thinking that just because I showed up at a club or a dance or a bar that I want to have their genitalia touching my backside."

Marbles adopted the pseudonym Jenna Marbles after her mother complained the search term "Mourey" resulted only in Jenna's videos on Google. Jenna's mother was unemployed when Jenna's first video went viral and was concerned that the content might put off potential employers. The name "Marbles" stems from her dog's name, Mr. Marbles.

Marbles portrayed Eve in the Epic Rap Battles of History episode "Adam vs. Eve", and she made appearances in Annoying Orange, Ridiculousness, and Smosh: The Movie. Marbles was featured in the rapper Pitbull's "Fireball" music video alongside fellow YouTubers Bart Baker and Brittany Furlan.

Alongside Anthony Padilla and Ian Hecox of Smosh, Marbles became the first YouTube personality to have her likeness appear as a wax figure displayed at Madame Tussauds New York, which she unveiled in 2015.

=== Indefinite hiatus ===
On June 25, 2020, Marbles uploaded an apology video to her YouTube channel following accusations of blackface and racism. In the video, she addressed content in YouTube videos that she originally published in 2011 and 2012. This included an impersonation of Nicki Minaj, using offensive language and costuming towards Asians, and using derogatory language towards sexually promiscuous women.

Marbles stated it was never her intent to hurt or offend anyone, acknowledging that these actions were "shameful" and "awful", wishing "it wasn't part of [her] past". She followed up these remarks by announcing her indefinite hiatus from YouTube. Marbles' then-boyfriend (now husband), Julien Solomita, announced on Twitter that the couple's joint podcast and Twitch streams would also be put on indefinite hiatus.

Public reaction to Marbles' apology was largely positive; The Berkeley Beacon noted that Marbles "was not the first to use the term 'accountability' in a YouTube apology, but she may have been the first one to actually mean it".

== Other ventures ==
In 2013, Marbles released a brand of dog toys called Kermie Worm & Mr. Marbles. The toys are modeled after her dogs' likenesses. She also created items with some of her most popular phrases printed on them, including "What are this?" and "Team legs!" In 2014, Marbles hosted a weekly pop countdown on SiriusXM Hits 1 named YouTube 15. In 2016, Marbles became an executive producer for Maximum Ride, a film based on James Patterson's series of novels of the same name.

== Personal life ==
In April 2021, Marbles became engaged to her longterm partner and fellow YouTuber Julien Solomita. They married in November 2022. Marbles along with Solomita have owned five dogs and fostered several further.

Marbles is a vegan.

As of 2013, Marbles was based in Santa Monica, California. In January 2023, Marbles and Solomita had an incident at their home where an intruder broke in, was subdued with pepper spray, and arrested.

== Awards and nominations ==
Year	Award	Category	Result	Notes	Ref.
2014	Streamy Award	Best First Person Series	Won		
2014	Streamy Award	Audience Choice Entertainer of the Year	Nominated		
2014	Streamy Award	Comedy	Nominated		
2014	Young Hollywood Award	Viral Superstar	Won		
2015	Streamy Award	Best Comedy Series	Nominated		
2015	Teen Choice Award	Choice YouTuber	Nominated		
2017	Streamy Award	Best First-Person Series	Nominated		
2017	Streamy Award	Audience Choice Creator of the Year	Nominated		
2017	Shorty Award	YouTube Ensemble	Won	With Julien Solomita	
2017	Shorty Award	YouTuber of the Year	Nominated		
2018	Streamy Award	Comedy	Nominated		
2018	Shorty Award	Creator of the Decade	Nominated		
