= Part Timers =

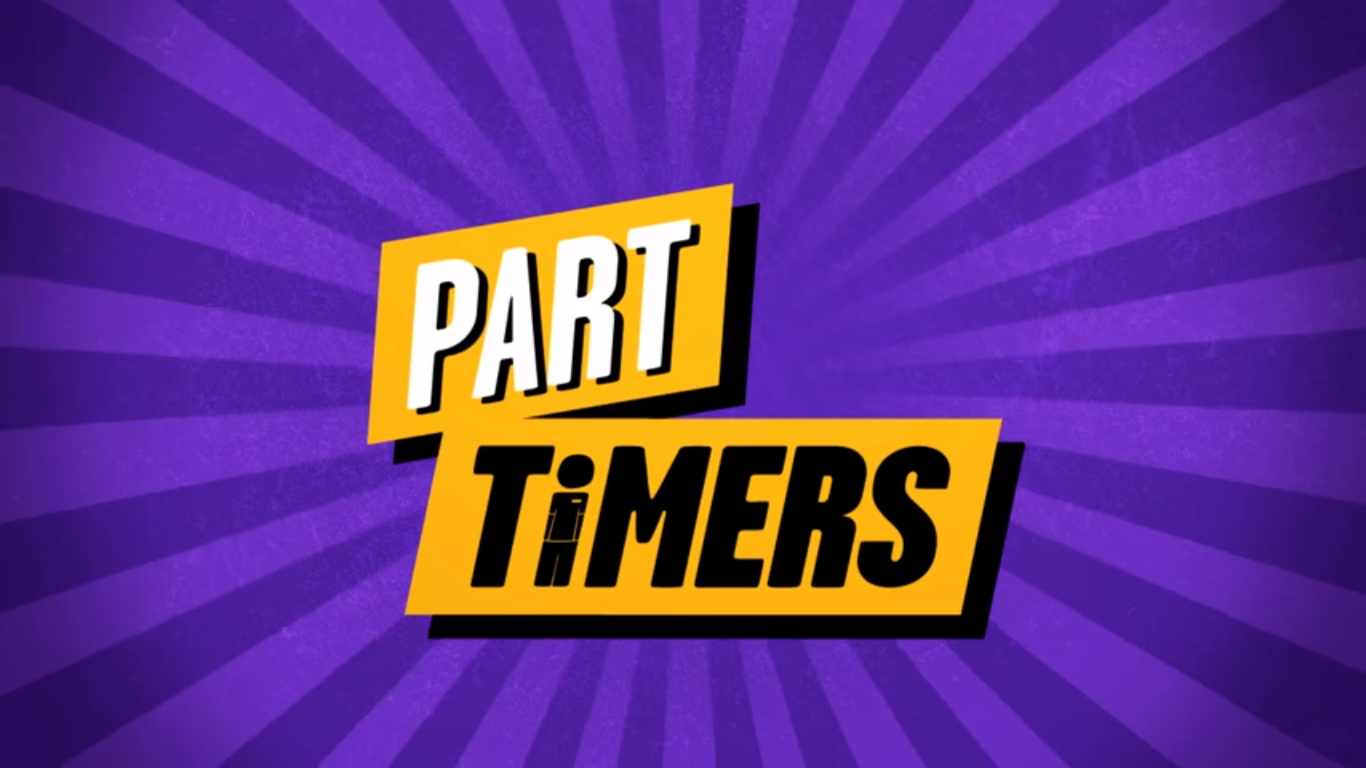
- Genre: Sitcom
- Created by: Ian Hecox; Anthony Padilla; Ryan Finnerty; Dominic Russo; Kate Vandevender
- Written by: Kate Vandevender; Joanna Quraishi; Tyler Greene; Leslie Korein; Steven Rubinshteyn; Dominic Russo; Spencer Sloan
- Directed by: Laura Murphy
- Starring: Ian Hecox; Anthony Padilla; Casey Webb; Cat Alter; Jade Martz; Natalie Whittle; Noah Grossman
- Opening theme: "Part Timers"
- Composers: Matter Music (feat.) Jaq Mackenzie; Kate Vandevender (lyrics)
- Country of origin: United States
- Original language: English
- No. of seasons: 2
- No. of episodes: 20

Production
- Executive producers: Barry Blumberg; Paul Germain (season 2); Ian Hecox; Jared Hoffman; Anthony Padilla; Chris Pollack; Kate Vandevender
- Cinematography: Justin Browne (season 1); Daniel Controneo (season 1); Hunter Sandison; Michael Wilson (season 1); Kevin Anderson (season 2); Jimmy Hammond (season 2); Brent Johnson (season 2)
- Editors: Devon Greene; Aaron Garcia (season 1); Jayson Matteucci; Bob Muir
- Camera setup: Single
- Running time: 10–12 minutes
- Production companies: Smosh Productions; Generate

Original release
- Network: YouTube
- Release: January 11 – May 30, 2016

Part Timers is a sitcom web series, created by and starring YouTube comedy duo Ian Hecox and Anthony Padilla, otherwise known as Smosh. It is Smosh's first scripted series, and is loosely based on Hecox's own real-life experiences as a part-timer. As usual with Smosh's content, each episodes usually ran from ten-to-twelve minutes long, is uploaded to Smosh's main channel, and features a behind-the-scenes footage the day after.

It premiered on January 11, 2016, and ran for 2 seasons subsequently, with the series being entirely directed by Laura Murphy. Its last episode premiered on April 30, 2016.

== Premise ==
Part Timers centers around the antics of the part-time employees of Pork E. Pine's, a run-down children's pizzeria and arcade, and is loosely based on Hecox's own experiences working at Chuck E. Cheese, prior to his YouTube fame. The series features Smosh as Pork E. Pine's hapless manager Anton (Padilla), who got the position with the help of his father despite his obvious lack of experience in the job, and his friend Ian (Hecox), the Pork E. Pine mascot. Also featured are Pete (Noah Grossman), a socially inept recent hire who harbours feelings for his somewhat neurotic colleague, Mads (Cat Alter), who works on the cleanup crew; Dinger (Casey Webb), an eccentric comic book nerd who mans the arcade prize booth; Lori (Natalie Whittle), the restaurant supervisor and the only level-headed member of staff; and Ella (Jade Martz), a ditzy, overly friendly employee with financial problems.

== Cast ==
- Ian Hecox as Ian, the man who works as Porky, the mascot of Pork E. Pines.
- Anthony Padilla as Anton, the new owner of Pork E. Pines, as it was given to him by his father.
- Casey Webb as Dinger, the man who runs the Pork E. Pines' prize booth. He's been there longer than any of the other employees.
- Jade Martz as Ella, a homeless woman that the pizzeria found in an alley and hired.
- Natalie Whittle as Lori, a woman seems to be the pizzeria's most level headed employee and is the assistant manager.
- Cat Alter as Mads, the woman works as the pizzeria's cleanup crew. She develops feelings for Pete. The series ends with her death from falling off the restaurant roof, and being run over by a car. She becomes a ghost and Pete has to have sex with her to set her free.
- Noah Grossman as Pete, Pork E. Pines' newest employee who develops a crush on Mads.

== Episodes ==
=== Season 1 ===
The first season was announced with a trailer on January 4, 2016, and premiered on January 11. The season finale aired on March 21.

No. overall	No. in season	Title	Directed by	Original release date
1	1	"Welcome to Pork E. Pines"	Laura Murphy	January 11, 2016
Following the death of new employee Scooter, Pork E. Pine's hires new guy Pete to replace him. Pete immediately takes an interest in Mads. Ian and Anton, believing him to be an undercover cop investigating Scooter's death, prepare for their eventual trip to prison.
2	2	"We're Gonna Be on TV"	Laura Murphy	January 18, 2016
Ian is scouted by a TV producer who wishes to do a Public Service Announcement on childhood obesity, starring him as mascot "Porky," but after falling and injuring himself, he is unable to perform. Not wanting to lose the revenue generated by the advertisement, Anton has to persuade Ian to let Dinger wear the suit instead.
3	3	"Hot and Raw"	Laura Murphy	January 25, 2016
Following a surprise visit from the health inspector, both Anton and Lori are left shaking - although for Lori, that might be more to do with the fact that the inspector is the narrator for the audiobook version of her favourite erotic novels. Pete seeks help from his co-workers in his pursuit of Mads. Guest star: Jon Bailey of Screen Junkies as Health Inspector
4	4	"Hobophobic"	Laura Murphy	February 1, 2016
After an apparent break-in by a homeless person, Anton installs security cameras, but instead uses them to spy on his staff. After discovering that Ella was the "hobo" who broke in (as she is homeless), Mads reluctantly agrees to give her a place to crash, but this only leads to a feud.
5	5	"Periscope Revenge"	Laura Murphy	February 8, 2016
One of Mads' friends, a popular foodie on Periscope, visits the restaurant to trial her new Spinach pizza, but after it emerges that the spinach is infected with E. Coli, she must prevent her from consuming it. Meanwhile, Pete and Dinger get stuck on the roof.
6	6	"New Ian Sucks"	Laura Murphy	February 15, 2016
While cleaning out the lost and found closet, Ella discovers a nude painting of Lori. Dinger wants it for his collection but Anton wants to use it to blackmail Lori, but fails due to the painting was painted by Anton's dad. meanwhile, Ian experiences an early mid-life crisis, and with the help of Mads, seeks to reform himself as a person.
7	7	"Fan Fiction Fail"	Laura Murphy	February 22, 2016
Fans of Dinger's fan fiction descend on Pork E. Pine's for a "convention" that he is holding. Anton, wanting to boost his image as a boss, recruits Pete to help him upgrade his parking space. Guest stars: David "Lasercorn" Moss and Matthew Sohinki (of Smosh Games) and David Odom and Ryan Tellez (of The Warp Zone) as fans of Dinger's fan fiction.
8	8	"How to Date a Mom"	Laura Murphy	February 29, 2016
Ian uses his Porky image to hit on moms who take their children to Pork E. Pine's, while Mads attempts to hold a first aid workshop for the employees.
9	9	"Guy vs Dead Guy"	Laura Murphy	March 7, 2016
Dinger is devastated when his elderly rival, Arnie beats his high score for the restaurant's arcade game, Amish Hitman Warrior, only for Arnie to die moments afterwards. His funeral is interrupted by spokesmen of the game's developers, who wish to hold a tournament of the game at the restaurant because Arnie broke the all-time record. Dinger is forced to impersonate him. Meanwhile, after being recruited to keep Arnie's daughter at bay, Mads goes too far in denying any attraction to Pete, hurting his feelings in the process.
10	10	"Secret Party"	Laura Murphy	March 14, 2016
Anton is invited by two of his father's friends to host a fundraiser for an endangered Brazilian porcupine, which presents him with the opportunity to interact with Sacramento's upper echelons. When Ella sends out invitations to the event on Craigslist, it is confused for a sex party dedicated to a forbidden sex move of the same name as the endangered animal, forcing Anton to separate the two groups and send the sex party to the kitchen. Both prove to be a roaring success, and Anton raises more than the 10,000 he was tasked with. Meanwhile, Pete and Mads take it upon themselves to shield other party guests from the goings-on inside the kitchen after bearing witness to it while searching for Mads's lost purse.
11	11	"Worst Wedding Ever"	Laura Murphy	March 21, 2016
Lori, who is Canadian, is facing deportation as her work visa has expired. Anton, not wanting to lose his only competent staff member, initially suggests she marry him, but when he changes his mind, Ian and Dinger compete for her hand instead. Lori is not impressed with either, and eventually agrees to marry Ella, who needs a new place to live. Meanwhile, Mads comes to the realisation that she wants more than just a friendship with Pete after all, but when she approaches to talk to him, he tells her that he agrees they should remain friends, and she decides not to say anything

=== Season 2 ===
The second season was announced in a trailer on March 28, 2016, and premiered on April 4. The season and series concluded on May 30.

No. overall	No. in season	Title	Directed by	Original release date
12	1	"Office Warfare"	Laura Murphy	April 4, 2016
Anton and Lori get into a power struggle, which Dinger takes advantage of to turn his workstation into a miniature rainforest, while Mads experiences recurring dreams about Pete.
13	2	"The War on Math"	Laura Murphy	April 11, 2016
Anton's difficulty with basic mathematics causes financial problems for the restaurant. When Lori suggests hiring a financial advisor, he unwisely turns to Ian, whose solutions often involve Dinger. When he is overworked and mistreated in the course of enacting these solutions, Dinger eventually unionises.
14	3	"Breaking Mads"	Laura Murphy	April 18, 2016
Mads is distraught when she fails her nursing course, so Dinger and Anton try to make her feel better by giving her a large amount candy to induce a sugar rush. Unfortunately, she becomes severely addicted to sugar, and begins acting as if she were addicted to an actual Class A drug. Meanwhile, upon discovering that Pete recently got arrested for illegally feeding ducks, Ian and Ella try to recruit him into their scheme to steal money from the arcade machines.
15	4	"Ian Gets Kidnapped"	Laura Murphy	April 25, 2016
After Ian and Ella accidentally smash a hole in the roof of Lori's office, they discover a cache of money and avocados illegally smuggled over from Florida. Ian follows the tunnel and ends up being taken hostage by the avocado smugglers. Lori deliberately stalls them, knowing that Ian's insufferable nature will wear the smugglers down. When Anton discovers the money in the fridge, where Ella had hidden it, he and the rest of the staff use it to buy a jet ski, which Lori gives to the smugglers in return for Ian.
16	5	"Who's the Father"	Laura Murphy	May 2, 2016
The staff are forced to stay late because a kid named Chad hasn't been collected by his mother yet. While waiting for her, Ian and Anton realise that his mother was their "first," both of which happened ten years previously, and Chad convinces them that one of them may be his father. They both compete to try and see which one is the better father, before Chad's mother arrives and informs them that his father is her husband (as well as the fact that one cannot get pregnant from kissing). Meanwhile, the rest of the staff compete to see who gets to go home early, and when Pete ends up disappearing in the ball pit, Mads inadvertently makes her feelings for him known.
17	6	"Friend Zone Problems"	Laura Murphy	May 9, 2016
While cleaning the ball pool, Ella decides she wants to be Ian's friend. Anton puts her through a formal application process to prove that she's worthy. Ella and Ian share personal secrets after Anton sets the two up on a 'friendship date'. Meanwhile, while cleaning the sink in the kitchen, Dinger and Mads become distracted by Pete, who annoys the staff when he becomes possessed by a haunted fake beard.
18	7	"Pork-O-LYMPICS"	Laura Murphy	May 16, 2016
The owner of the bowling alley next door challenges the Pork E. Pine's staff to a series of games for the right to use their shared alley. Anton tries to prevent Ella from falling for the owner.
19	8	"First Kiss Fail" (Part 1)	Laura Murphy	May 23, 2016
Ian and Anton enter into couples therapy after fearing that their spark is gone. Mads and Pete hook up at work, with disastrous results.
20	9	"Ghosted (Originally Named Ghost Sex)" (Part 2)	Laura Murphy	May 30, 2016
The ghost of Mads comes back to Pork E. Pines to fulfill her unfulfilled wish about having sex with Pete. Everyone except Dinger sees her. Pete eventually decides to help her in order for her to go to the afterlife. Before that, Ian, Anton, Ella, Lori, and Dinger say farewell to Mads.
