= Smosh: The Movie =

2015 film by Alex Winter

- Promotional release poster
- Directed by: Alex Winter
- Written by: Eric Falconer; Steve Marmel
- Based on: Smosh by: Ian Hecox; Anthony Padilla
- Produced by: Brian Robbins; Shauna Phelan
- Starring: Ian Hecox; Anthony Padilla; Jenna Marbles; Grace Helbig; Harley Morenstein; Jillian Nelson; Brittany Ross; Michael Ian Black
- Cinematography: Joe DeSalvo
- Edited by: Scott Richter
- Music by: The Outfit
- Production companies: AwesomenessFilms; Defy Media; Smosh Productions
- Distributed by: 20th Century Fox Home Entertainment
- Release dates: July 23, 2015 (Vidcon); July 24, 2015 (United States)
- Running time: 85 minutes
- Country: United States
- Language: English
- Budget: $1 million

Smosh: The Movie is a 2015 American science fiction buddy comedy film directed by Alex Winter. Starring Anthony Padilla and Ian Hecox from Smosh, it was written by Eric Falconer and Steve Marmel, with Brian Robbins and Shauna Phelan serving as producers. Jillian Nelson, Brittany Ross, Jenna Marbles, Grace Helbig, Mark Fischbach, Harley Morenstein, and Michael Ian Black star in supporting roles. It is Smosh's first full-length film, and revolves around a fictionalized version of the duo going inside YouTube virtually to alter a clip that will ruin Anthony's chances of winning over his high school crush at an upcoming reunion.

Smosh: The Movie premiered at VidCon in Los Angeles on July 23, 2015, and was released the following day on VoD on July 24, 2015, by 20th Century Fox Home Entertainment. It received generally negative reviews.

== Plot ==
Anthony Padilla & Ian Hecox are best friends and live in a small house, with Ian's parents. Anthony has a dead-end job as a pizza delivery man and Ian is a stay-at-home guy who spends his days watching YouTube. After returning from the Game Bang arcade, in which they were bullied by some street kids due to Anthony's pizza car, they find a video of Anthony singing the Magic Pocket Slave Monsters theme at their high school graduation. In the video, Anthony attempts to impress his crush, Anna Reed, by trying to do a backflip, but he fails, landing on his face, and resulting in the microphone being rectally jammed. After learning their fifth-year high school reunion is on the same day, Anthony & Ian decide to take down the YouTube video before it blows Anthony's chances of reconnecting with Anna.

They travel to YouTube's headquarters, where they meet a receptionist named Stephanie, who introduces them to the CEO of the company, Steve YouTube. Steve explains that the only way to fix the video is by going inside YouTube through a portal and changing the video from the inside. Anthony insists that it is important enough to go through with it, so Ian accompanies him in traveling into YouTube. Steve provides the duo with two electronic phones equipped with an artificial intelligence named Diri and sends them through the portal that is behind his closet door. After tumbling through a series of YouTube videos, they eventually end up in a Jenna Marbles vlog. Jenna warns them that once their Diri phones run out of battery, they will be permanently stuck in YouTube, just like she is.

They decide to split up, but Ian immediately abandons the mission and travels to a video uploaded by his crush, "Butt Massage Girl", while Anthony escapes a furry party, gets advice from Steve Austin, and finds out that Anna really likes him too. Diri takes Anthony to the Butt Massage Girl video that Ian is getting a massage in. Anthony tells Ian that his and Butt Massage Girl's love is fake and that it's only a video.

The duo then make it to the embarrassing video, where a furious Anthony discovers that Ian was the one who recorded and uploaded the video. Ian finally expresses his frustration with how boring Anthony has become, which leads to an argument between the pair. They both engage in a fight that lasts through three other videos, ending with them returning to Anthony's video. Ian decides to make it up to Anthony by beating up his past self, preventing his humiliation. Anthony then goes to help him, but past Ian interferes and attacks Anthony, while Ian is trying to knock out past Anthony. In the process, the other students also start to fight one another. During the battle, Diri reveals itself to be Steve YouTube, who tells them that sending the two into YouTube was part of his evil scheme to keep them in YouTube forever.

Frightened, they race to escape YouTube via their video history, with Steve putting several unsuccessful obstacles in their way, as they make it to the portal only for Steve YouTube to be there waiting for them. Suddenly, a bear appears and attacks Steve, allowing the duo to escape YouTube. Returning to the real world, Anthony and Ian discover that, due to their changes to Anthony's embarrassing video, now titled "Clone Fight", they wound up in an alternate reality where they have become famous, met the President of the United States, created a movie, a TV series, and a show on Broadway. Because of this, Ian is dating Butt Massage Girl, Anthony has 30 girlfriends, whom he immediately rejects and the duo are now living in a mansion in which Ian's parents live with them. Steve YouTube, now going by You-too-bay, has Anthony's former job as a pizza delivery man and Jenna Marbles is the CEO of YouTube. Butt Massage Girl accompanies them as they go to their high school reunion.

As they arrive at their reunion, they discover they are the most famous ones there. When Anthony seeks out Anna and finds her, he is dismayed to find out that Anna loved him back in the day, but she was intimidated by him being rich and famous. Encouraged by Ian and an image of Austin, Anthony performs 'Magic Pocket Slave Monsters,' and successfully performs the backflip, alongside Ian and finally wins Anna over, and they kiss. Butt Massage Girl and Anna meet onstage to which Butt Massage Girl reveals her name is Brad, to which Ian exclaims explosively.

In a post-credits scene, Ian marries Brad with Anthony crying in the background.

== Cast ==
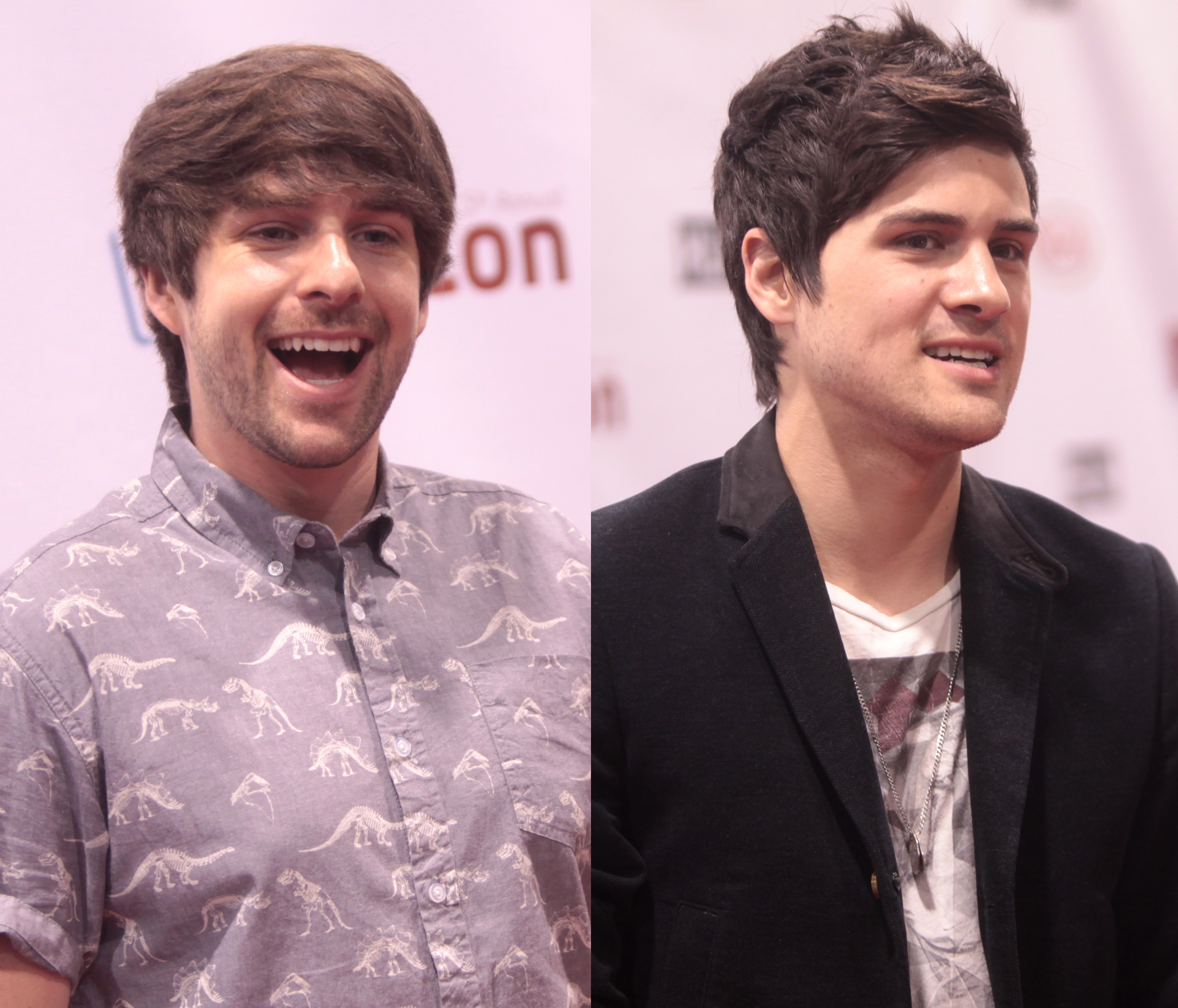
Anthony Padilla and Ian Hecox play both fictionalized versions of themselves in the film

- Anthony Padilla as fictionalized version of himself
- Ian Hecox as fictionalized version of himself
- Jillian Nelson as Anna Reed
- Brittany Ross as Brad/Butt Massage Girl
- Michael Ian Black as Steve YouTube
- Stone Cold Steve Austin as fictionalized version of himself
- Jenna Marbles as fictionalized version of herself
- Harley Morenstein as The Mailman
- Grace Helbig as Stephanie
- Mark Fischbach as fictionalized version of himself
- Kimmy Gatewood as the voice of Diri
- Damion Poitier as Super Boring Man
- Dominic Sandoval as Nearby Student
- Elisha Yaffe as High Driver
- Mari Takahashi as fictionalized version of herself (cameo appearance)
- Matthew Sohinki as fictionalized version of himself (cameo appearance)
- Joshua "Jovenshire" Ovenshire as fictionalized version of himself (cameo appearance)
- David "Lasercorn" Moss as fictionalized version of himself (cameo appearance)
- Amra "Flitz" Ricketts as fictionalized version of himself (cameo appearance)
- Alex Winter as Anna's Uncle (pictured and uncredited)

== Production ==
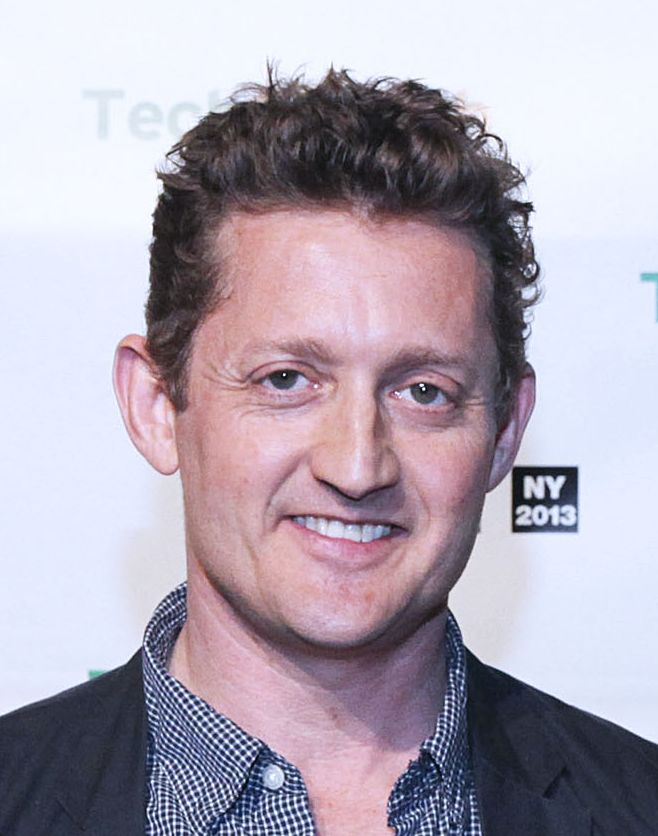
Director Alex Winter

On September 18, 2014, Lionsgate announced that it has picked up the international distribution rights to the movie, while 20th Century Fox picked up American VOD and physical distribution rights to the movie. Production for the film was jointly financed by AwesomenessFilms, Smosh Productions, and Defy Media. The film was written from an original story by Eric Falconer and Steve Marmel, while being produced by Brian Robbins, with Padilla and Hecox serving as executive producers. Alex Winter was hired as the director for the film. It was entirely shot in YouTube Space in Los Angeles, California. In May 2020, Ian Hecox revealed on the podcast Cold Ones that the movie originally got an R rating from the MPAA.

== Release ==
On April 15, 2015, it was announced that the film would release on July 24, 2015, and would be having its gala world premiere at Vidcon 2015 in Anaheim, California, a day before. An official trailer was released on Smosh's website on June 12, 2015. They also hosted a commentary live-stream on their YouTube channel at July 21, 2015.

=== Home media ===
The film was released on DVD on August 18, 2015, by Twentieth Century Fox Home Entertainment, featuring an Unrated version with some deleted scenes, including a scene featuring Shane Dawson as the Sex Simulator Guy. Shortly thereafter, Netflix acquired the worldwide streaming rights to the film courtesy of AwesomenessFilms in 2015, and was released in August 2019.

== Reception ==
=== Critical reception ===
The film received negative reviews, with criticism aimed at the direction, writing, acting, and humor, but some praise was given to Padilla and Hecox's comedic chemistry. It has also been the subject of mockery to YouTube film commentators, comparing it to similar films like the Fred trilogy, Not Cool (2014), and Airplane Mode (2019), all of which are web comedy films that are of lowbrow humor created by and featuring high-profile YouTube celebrities.

The New York Times gave it a negative review, describing the film as "a fairly successful effort to apply the tone and comic style of those hastily produced weekly shorts to a feature-length script with an actual plot." The review went on to note that it was "clever and surprisingly easy to sit through." The review concluded that "Is it worth your $9.99? Maybe not, but if you can buy it on your parents' credit card, you'll probably enjoy it." Common Sense Media gave it a 2 out of 5, stating that although they are a "popular YouTube sensation, they have a Millennial Dumb and Dumber/slacker shtick that's funny for a second and then quickly grows tedious." The review also criticized the acting and summarized that "if Hollywood was looking for a movie that truly elevates web celebs to the status of pulling off a feature-length film, this isn't it."

Both Padilla and Hecox would later acknowledge the film's poor reputation in 2023 in an interview on Padilla's channel. In 2026, during an interview with Fast Company, Padilla and Hecox jokingly expressed interest in an updated remake of the film.

== See also ==
- YouTuber film
