= Del Campo High School =

Public high school near Sacramento, California

Coordinates: 38°39′16.24″N 121°18′42.80″W

Location
- 4925 Dewey Dr. Fair Oaks, California 95628

Information
- Type: Public high school
- Motto: Go Cougars
- Established: 1963
- School district: San Juan Unified School District
- Principal: Greg Snyder
- Grades: 9 to 12
- Enrollment: 1,557 (2023-2024)
- Campus: Suburban
- Colors: Blue & Gold
- Song: DC
- Fight song: Del Campo
- Athletics conference: Capital Athletic League San Joaquin section
- Mascot: Cougar
- Team name: Cougars
- Rivals: Casa Roble High School, Bella Vista High School
- Publication: Koug media
- Newspaper: Roar
- Yearbook: The Decamhian- Del Campo's yearbook, the Decamhian (short for Del Campo high Annual)
- Website: Del Campo High School Online

Del Campo High School, is a public high school in Fair Oaks, California. It is a member of the San Juan Unified School District and serves western Fair Oaks and eastern Carmichael.

== Academic curriculum ==
Del Campo's academic program is validated by an Academic Performance Index increase of 56 points over a three-year period. In 1995, Del Campo adopted the 4X4 Block Schedule which enables students to focus on four ninety-two-minute classes each term. This allows students to complete eight more classes than others would on a traditional schedule to prepare for the academic demands of university. In 1996, Del Campo High School received California Distinguished High School honors. College prep classes may include honors classes in English, Science, and Social Studies, as well as Advanced Placement classes in Biology, Calculus AB & BC, Chemistry, Microeconomics, English Language, English Literature, French, Spanish, Statistics, U.S. Government, and U.S. History. Tutoring is a component of the AVID program.

Students who are members of the yearbook, the Decamhian, or the newspaper, the ROAR, as well as cadets in the Air Force JROTC program, have been nationally recognized for performance in the programs. A Fine and Performing Arts program affords students opportunities in music, art and theater. Del Campo also has an Academic Decathlon program; the school has performed well in the Sacramento County competition since the 1980s.

== Extracurricular activities ==
- Air Force JROTC CA-863rd Cadet Squadron
- Yearbook The Decamhian - Del Campo's yearbook, the Decamhian (short for Del Campo High Annual), has received 16 National Pacemaker Awards and 13 National Scholastic Press Association All-American Awards, as well as 14 Gold Crown Awards and 2 Silver Crown Awards awarded by Columbia Scholastic Press Association
- Newspaper The ROAR - winner of a Gold Medal from the American Scholastic Press Association, as well as a six-time winner of the Columbia Press Association's Gold Medal
- AVID Del Campo is a National Demonstration school. It usually graduates the AVID class with 100% college enrollment.
- DC Daily DC Daily is a Student Educational Video Award (SEVA) winning student produced live daily broadcast to Del Campo students, staff and community.

== Notable alumni ==
- Dusty Baker (Class of 1967) - former Major League Baseball player, manager of Washington Nationals, San Francisco Giants, Chicago Cubs, Cincinnati Reds, and Houston Astros
- Jason Barnes - Canadian Football League's Edmonton Eskimos wide receiver
- Matt Barnes - forward for 2017 NBA champion Golden State Warriors who has played for nine NBA teams
- Betsy Butler (Class of 1981) - California State Assemblywoman
- Donald Butler (Class of 2006) - linebacker for San Diego Chargers, 79th overall pick in 2010 NFL draft
- Akiem Hicks (Class of 2007)- professional football player with Tampa Bay Buccaneers, 89th pick in 2012 NFL draft
- Tom Johnson - PGA Tour golfer
- Kurt Knudsen - professional baseball player
- Sandee Westgate - Actress
- Lisa Ling - television personality and host of National Geographic Channel's Explorer
- John Freeman (Class of 1992) - Author, Founder of Freeman's, Editor at Granta.
- Sam Long - San Francisco Giants baseball player
- Rick Schu - nine-year MLB infielder
- Spencer Stone - Former staff sergeant of the United States Air Force, known for foiling a 2015 terrorist attack in France.
- Rene Syler (Class of 1981) - former host of The Early Show on CBS
- Anthony Padilla and Ian Hecox (Class of 2005)- co-founders of Smosh
