= Akiem Hicks =

American football player (born 1989)

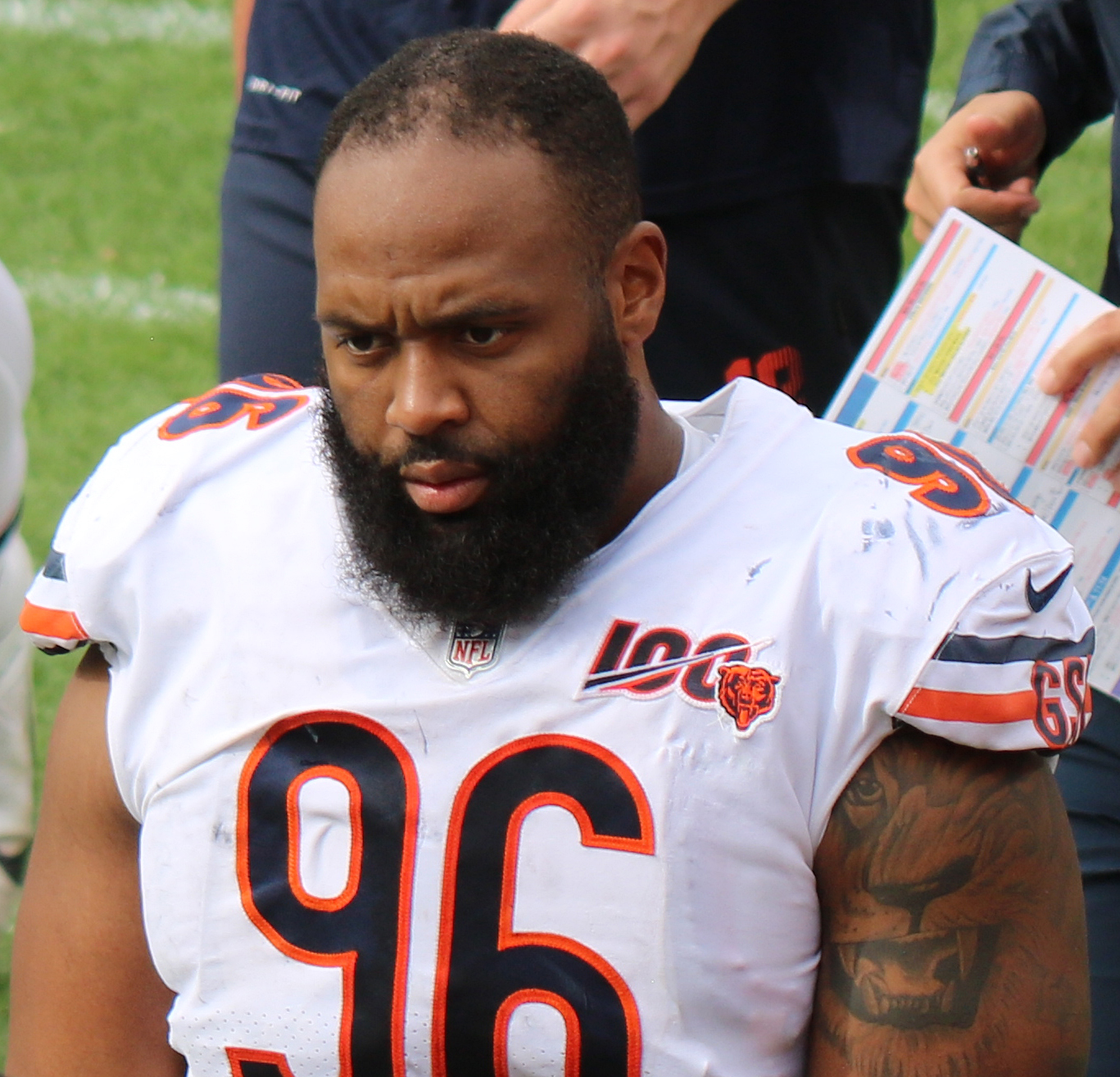
- Hicks with the Chicago Bears in 2019

No. 76, 72, 96
- Position: Defensive end

Personal information
- Born: November 16, 1989 (age 37); Elk Grove, California, U.S.
- Listed height: 6 ft 5 in (1.96 m)
- Listed weight: 325 lb (147 kg)

Career information
- High school: Del Campo (Fair Oaks, California)
- College: Sacramento City (2007–2008)
- University: Regina (2010–2011)
- NFL draft: 2012: 3rd round, 89th overall pick

Career history
- New Orleans Saints (2012–2015); New England Patriots (2015); Chicago Bears (2016–2021); Tampa Bay Buccaneers (2022)

Awards and highlights
- Pro Bowl (2018); 100 greatest Bears of All-Time; CIS First-Team All-Canadian (2011)

Career NFL statistics
- Total tackles: 409
- Sacks: 41.5
- Forced fumbles: 6
- Fumble recoveries: 6
- Pass deflections: 12
- Stats at Pro Football Reference

Akiem Jamar Hicks (born November 16, 1989) is an American former professional football player who was a defensive end in the National Football League (NFL). He was selected by the New Orleans Saints in the third round of the 2012 NFL draft and has also played for the New England Patriots, Chicago Bears and Tampa Bay Buccaneers. He played college football at Sacramento City College and at the University of Regina.

== Early life ==
A native of Sacramento, California, Hicks was born in Elk Grove, attended Del Campo High School in Fair Oaks, and began his college career at Sacramento City College. After the 2008 season, he was rated as a top junior college player and signed to play at LSU. However, recruiting violations by LSU made him ineligible for the 2009 season; unable to transfer to another American football program, he went to work at a DirecTV call center in Colorado Springs, Colorado while he considered his next move. Hicks had an offer to play for the Toronto Argonauts of the Canadian Football League, but decided instead to continue his education and collegiate football career with the Regina Rams of the Canada West Universities Athletic Association. After his first season at Regina, he was selected by the Omaha Nighthawks of the United Football League, but again decided to stay in college. In his second year at Regina, he made 42 tackles and 6 1/2 sacks and was named the CWUAA's top lineman. A strong performance in the East-West Shrine Game increased his profile with NFL scouts.

== Professional career ==
Pre-draft measurables
Height	Weight	Arm length	Hand span	Wingspan	40-yard dash	10-yard split	20-yard split	20-yard shuttle	Three-cone drill	Vertical jump	Broad jump	Bench press
6 ft 4 5/8 in (1.95 m)	318 lb (144 kg)	35 1/8 in (0.89 m)	10 1/4 in (0.26 m)	7 ft 1 3/4 in (2.18 m)	5.23 s	1.77 s	3.05 s	4.86 s	7.39 s	32.0 in (0.81 m)	9 ft 2 in (2.79 m)	27 reps
All values from NFL Combine/Pro Day

=== New Orleans Saints ===
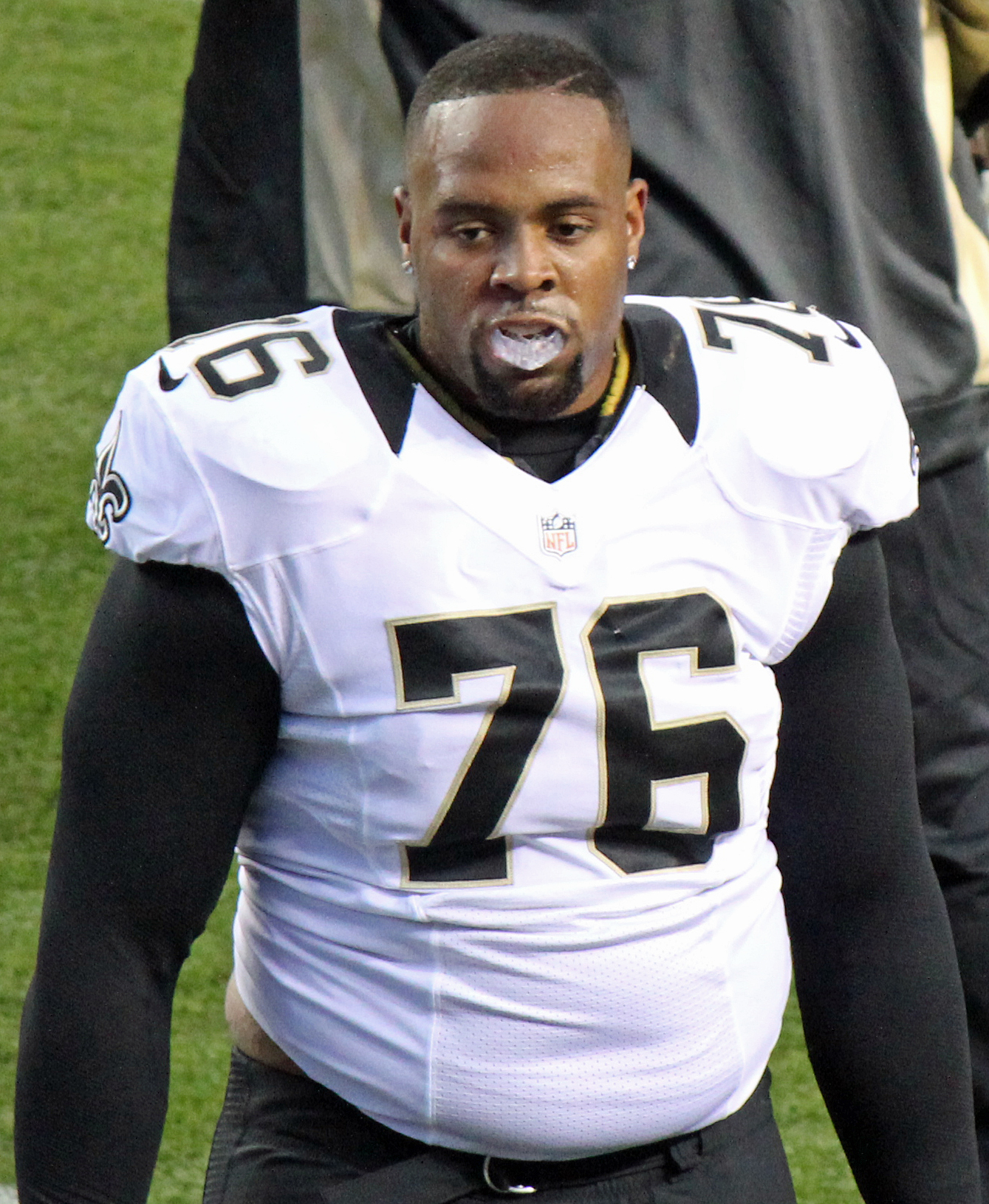
Hicks with the Saints in 2012

The Saints selected Hicks in the third round of the 2012 NFL draft; it was the Saints' first pick of the draft. He became the ninth Canadian Interuniversity Sport player to be selected in the NFL draft, and the second-highest NFL draft pick in CIS history (behind only Mike Schad, a first round pick in 1986). As a rookie in 2012, Hicks played 14 games making 20 tackles, a pass defended, and a forced fumble.

In 2013, Hicks started all 16 games making 43 tackles and 4.5 sacks.

In 2014, he played 15 games with 42 tackles, two sacks, and two passes defended.

To begin the 2015 season with the Saints, Hicks played three games with three tackles.

=== New England Patriots ===
On September 30, 2015, Hicks was traded to the New England Patriots for tight end Michael Hoomanawanui.

On December 20, 2015, Hicks scored a touchdown in the Patriots' 33–16 win against the Tennessee Titans, recovering the ball for a touchdown after a Chandler Jones strip sack. For the remainder of the 2015 season with the Patriots, Hicks played 13 games with 21 tackles, three sacks, and a fumble recovery for a touchdown. Overall in 2015, combined with both teams, Hicks played 16 games with 24 tackles. The Patriots finished the season with a 12–4 record to clinch an AFC East division title until losing to the Denver Broncos in the AFC Championship game by a score of 20–18.

=== Chicago Bears ===
==== 2016 ====
On March 13, 2016, Hicks signed a two-year contract with the Chicago Bears. On September 11, 2016, Hicks made his debut as a Chicago Bear against the Houston Texans, recording 3 tackles and a forced fumble. On September 23, 2016, Hicks was fined $18,231 for roughing the passer, regarding a helmet-to-helmet hit on Carson Wentz in Week 2 against the Eagles. On October 2, 2016, Hicks recorded his first sack of the season on Matthew Stafford and the Detroit Lions. On October 31, 2016, Hicks recorded two sacks against the Minnesota Vikings. On December 4, 2016, Hicks recorded 10 tackles plus two sacks and a forced fumble in a 26–6 win over the San Francisco 49ers, earning him NFC Defensive Player of the Week. On December 11, 2016, Hicks recorded a sack against the Detroit Lions. Hicks's seventh sack of the season was a career-high.

==== 2017 ====
On September 9, 2017, Hicks signed a four-year, $48 million contract extension with the Bears.

On September 10, against the Atlanta Falcons in the season opener at Soldier Field, Hicks had two sacks in the 23–17 loss.

==== 2018 ====
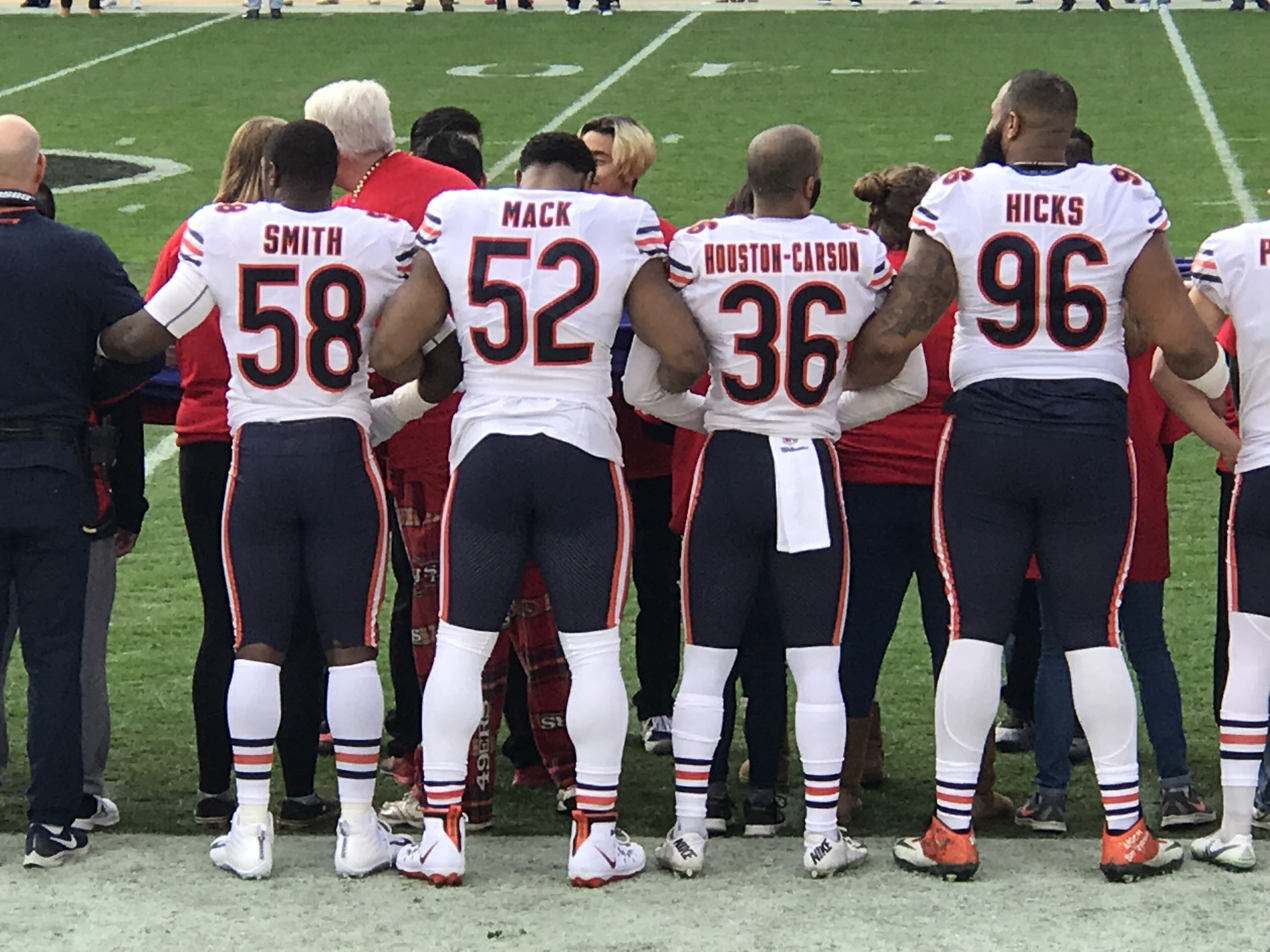
Hicks with Roquan Smith, DeAndre Houston-Carson, and Khalil Mack of the Chicago Bears in 2018

During Week 4 of the 2018 season against the Tampa Bay Buccaneers, Hicks was ejected for pushing an official out of the way after being involved in a fight with Buccaneers offensive lineman Ali Marpet. Hicks was not suspended, but was fined $33,425.

In week 11 against the Minnesota Vikings, Hicks sacked quarterback Kirk Cousins once, along with recording a career-best five tackles for a loss. The Bears won the game 25–20.

Hicks also saw occasional playing time on offense during the season. In a week 13 loss to the New York Giants, he lined up at upback alongside defensive end Roy Robertson-Harris on fourth-and-goal from the Giants' one-yard line. Receiving the hand-off, Hicks ran for the one-yard touchdown. The play was dubbed "Freezer Left" by head coach Matt Nagy in tribute to William "The Refrigerator" Perry, a defensive lineman who sporadically played fullback for the Bears in the 1980s. Hicks was the first Bears defensive player to score a touchdown on offense since linebacker Brian Urlacher caught a touchdown pass from punter Brad Maynard on a fake field goal in 2001.

Hicks finished the season with 55 tackles, 7.5 sacks, and three forced fumbles. He received an overall grade of 91.6 from Pro Football Focus in 2018, which ranked as the 4th highest grade among all qualifying interior defenders. He was named to the 2019 Pro Bowl roster.

==== 2019 ====
In week 1 against the Green Bay Packers, Hicks recorded the first sack of his season on Aaron Rodgers as the Bears lost 10–3. In week 3 against the Washington Redskins, Hicks recovered a fumble forced by teammate Khalil Mack before exiting the game with a knee injury. Without Hicks, the Bears won the game 31–15. On October 15, the Bears placed Hicks on injured reserve after an elbow injury. He was designated for return from injured reserve on December 2, 2019, and began practicing with the team again. He was activated on December 14, 2019. Hicks made his return in a game against the Packers, but reaggravated the injury during the game. He did not play another down for the rest of the season.

==== 2020 ====
Hicks made his return from injury in Week 1 against the Detroit Lions and sacked Matthew Stafford once during the 27–23 win. In Week 2 against the New York Giants Hicks recorded another sack, this time on Daniel Jones during the 17–13 win.

==== 2021 ====
Hicks started his 2021 season with a half sack in a Week 1 game against the Los Angeles Rams sacking Matthew Stafford in a 34–14 loss. Hicks played in weeks 2 and 3 and was injured for weeks 4 and 5. Hicks came back for week 6 to face Aaron Rodgers and the Green Bay Packers, where he recorded another sack in a 24–14 loss. Hicks was injured again for week 7 but would come back to play in two more games before the Chicago Bears week 10 bye. Hicks again missed weeks 11–14 with an ankle sprain before coming back in week 15 against the Minnesota Vikings and sacked Kirk Cousins two times in a home game that saw Cousins throw for a career low in yards of only 87 in a 17–9 loss.

=== Tampa Bay Buccaneers ===
On June 2, 2022, Hicks signed with the Tampa Bay Buccaneers. On September 20, 2022, it was announced that Hicks would miss at least a month of action after suffering a torn plantar fascia in Week 2 against the New Orleans Saints.

=== NFL career statistics ===
Legend
**Bold**	Career high

Year	Team	Games		Tackles				Interceptions						Fumbles			
Year	Team	GP	GS	Comb	Solo	Ast	Sack	Int	Yds	Avg	Lng	TD	PD	FF	FR	Yds	TD
2012	NO	14	0	20	10	10	0.0	0	0	0.0	0	0	1	1	0	0	0
2013	NO	16	16	**56**	29	**27**	4.5	0	0	0.0	0	0	0	0	0	0	0
2014	NO	15	14	41	27	14	2.0	0	0	0.0	0	0	0	0	0	0	0
2015	NO	3	3	2	0	2	0.0	0	0	0.0	0	0	0	0	0	0	0
2015	NE	13	0	21	9	12	3.0	0	0	0.0	0	0	0	0	1	0	**1**
2016	CHI	16	16	54	36	18	7.0	0	0	0.0	0	0	2	2	1	0	0
2017	CHI	16	16	54	39	15	**8.5**	0	0	0.0	0	0	0	0	**2**	0	0
2018	CHI	16	16	55	**41**	14	7.5	0	0	0.0	0	0	**5**	**3**	0	0	0
2019	CHI	5	5	10	10	0	1.0	0	0	0.0	0	0	0	0	1	0	0
2020	CHI	15	15	49	30	19	3.5	0	0	0.0	0	0	1	0	1	**4**	0
2021	CHI	9	9	25	19	6	3.5	0	0	0.0	0	0	0	0	0	0	0
2022	TB	11	11	22	13	9	1.0	0	0	0.0	0	0	3	0	0	0	0
Career		149	121	409	263	146	41.5	0	0	0.0	0	0	12	6	6	4	1
Postseason
2013	NO	2	2	**7**	**3**	**4**	**0.5**	0	0	0.0	0	0	0	0	0	0	0
2015	NE	2	0	3	1	2	0.0	0	0	0.0	0	0	0	0	0	0	0
2018	CHI	1	1	4	**3**	1	0.0	0	0	0.0	0	0	0	0	0	0	0
2020	CHI	1	1	6	**3**	3	0.0	0	0	0.0	0	0	0	0	0	0	0
2022	TB	1	1	3	**3**	0	0.0	0	0	0.0	0	0	**1**	0	0	0	0
Career		7	5	23	13	10	0.5	0	0	0.0	0	0	1	0	0	0	0
