= Donald Butler =

American football player (born 1988)

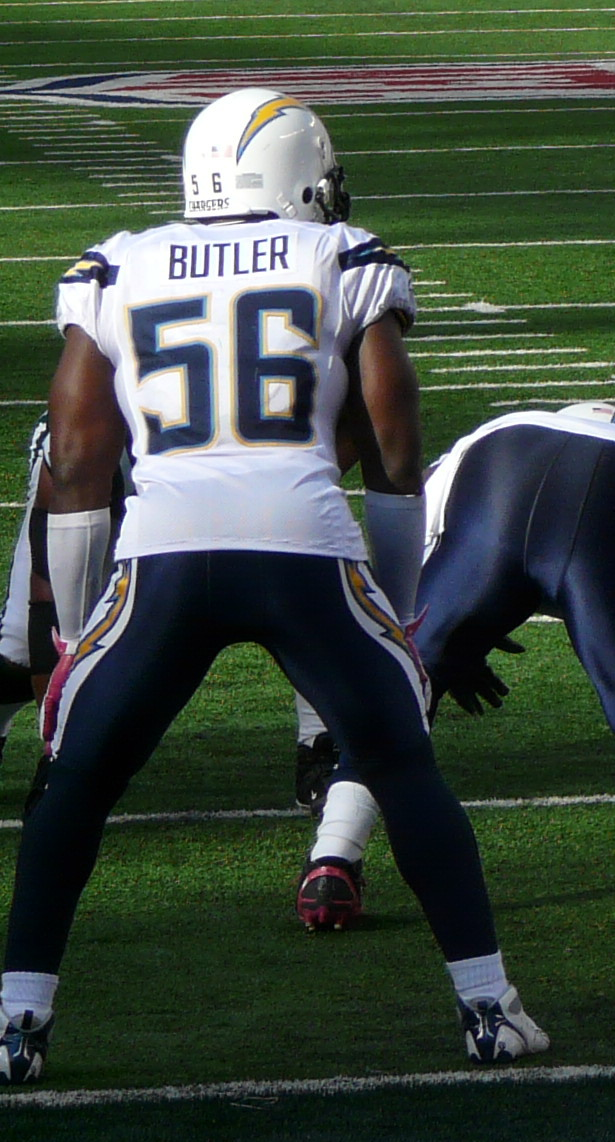
- Butler with the San Diego Chargers in 2011

No. 56
- Position: Linebacker

Personal information
- Born: October 17, 1988 (age 38); Sacramento, California, U.S.
- Listed height: 6 ft 1 in (1.85 m)
- Listed weight: 242 lb (110 kg)

Career information
- High school: Del Campo (Fair Oaks, California)
- College: Washington
- NFL draft: 2010: 3rd round, 79th overall pick

Career history
- San Diego Chargers (2010–2015); Arizona Cardinals (2016)*; Miami Dolphins (2016)
- * Offseason or practice squad member only

Awards and highlights
- Second-team All-Pac-10 (2009)

Career NFL statistics
- Total tackles: 401
- Sacks: 7
- Forced fumbles: 5
- Fumble recoveries: 6
- Interceptions: 3
- Defensive touchdowns: 2
- Stats at Pro Football Reference

Donald Aubrey Butler (born October 17, 1988) is an American former professional football player who was a linebacker in the National Football League (NFL). He played college football for the Washington Huskies. He was considered one of the top linebacker prospects for the 2010 NFL draft, and was selected with the 79th overall pick by the San Diego Chargers.

== Early life ==
Butler attended Del Campo High School in Fair Oaks, California. As a junior in 2004, he had 1,504 rushing yards and 22 touchdowns, leading Del Campo to a 9–2 record and the Capital Athletic League championship. He was selected an All-Metro second-team and All-CAL MVP pick. Limited to seven games by a hamstring injury, Butler led Del Campo to an 8-3 record and a state playoff berth as a senior in 2005, rushing for 762 yards and 16 touchdowns, with an average of 9.29 yards per carry and 108.9 yards per game. He was named an honorable mention All-Metro selection by the Sacramento Bee. Butler also lettered in track & field while at Del Campo. He competed as a sprinter (11.38 seconds in the 100-meter dash and 23.53 seconds in the 200-meter dash) and long jumper (personal-best of 6.21m or 20'4").

Butler was named one of the Top 15 prospects in the Sacramento area by the Sacramento Bee. He was ranked 55th nationally among outside linebackers by Rivals.com. On March 3, 2005, Butler committed to the University of Washington.

== College career ==
In four years at Washington, Butler had 239 tackles (159 solo), 26.5 TFLs (for 78 yards), three sacks (for 35 yards), five forced fumbles, one fumble recovery, two interceptions (for 15 yards), and seven pass deflections. At the NFL Combine, he had 35 reps benching 225. At his Pro Day, he had a 4.61 40, a 35.5 vertical, a 121.0 broad jump, a 4.28 shuttle, and a 6.93 three cone drill.

== Professional career ==
Pre-draft measurables
Height	Weight	40-yard dash	10-yard split	20-yard split	20-yard shuttle	Three-cone drill	Vertical jump	Broad jump	Bench press
6 ft 1 in (1.85 m)	245 lb (111 kg)	4.61 s	1.63 s	2.67 s	4.28 s	6.93 s	35 1/2 in (0.90 m)	10 ft 1 in (3.07 m)	35 reps
Values from NFL Combine and pro day

=== San Diego Chargers ===
In the 2010 NFL draft, the San Diego Chargers traded up 12 spots to select the Butler in the third round. Butler suffered a season-ending injury prior to the start of his rookie season as he tore his left Achilles tendon during a pass rush drill. He was placed on the injured reserve list on August 31. The linebacker spent all of the 2010 season rehabilitating.

However, in the 2011 season, his first in the NFL, Butler had his breakout season as he became an immediate starter on the Chargers' defense. Butler had 96 tackles playing in all 16 games, including 2 sacks, 2 forced fumbles, and an interception, playing alongside veteran linebacker Takeo Spikes.

In 2012, Butler was already a well-known and vocal team leader for the Chargers. Playing in only 12 games, he managed to make 77 tackles, 3 of which were sacks. He had a stellar game against the Kansas City Chiefs on September 30, where he caught a tipped off ball and returned the interception for a 21-yard touchdown. Butler was named AFC Defensive Player of the Week for that performance.

Butler again was known as a team leader in 2013, being elected a team captain in his fourth year. Butler played 13 games, missing 3 with a groin injury, managing to make 84 tackles, half a sack, 1 interception, and a fumble recovery. In the wild card round vs the Cincinnati Bengals, Butler stripped running back Giovani Bernard from behind, which was ruled a fumble and recovered by the Chargers.

Butler was an impending free agent for the 2014 NFL season, but on February 28, 2014, he announced on Twitter that he would be staying with the Chargers on a multi-year deal. He was placed on injured reserve with a dislocated elbow on December 15, 2014.

Butler was released by the Chargers on March 3, 2016.

=== Arizona Cardinals ===
On July 27, 2016, Butler was signed by the Arizona Cardinals. On September 3, 2016, he was released by the Cardinals.

=== Miami Dolphins ===
On September 13, 2016, Butler was signed by the Dolphins.

=== NFL statistics ===
Year	Team	GP	COMB	TOTAL	AST	SACK	FF	FR	FR YDS	INT	IR YDS	AVG IR	LNG	TD	PD
2011	SD	16	96	78	18	2.0	2	1	37	1	2	2	2	0	2
2012	SD	12	77	50	27	3.0	2	0	0	1	21	21	21	1	4
2013	SD	13	84	71	13	0.5	0	1	0	1	30	30	30	0	4
2014	SD	14	73	45	28	1.0	0	3	0	0	0	0	0	0	2
2015	SD	16	43	24	19	0.5	1	1	1	1	0	0	0	0	0
2016	MIA	14	28	17	11	0.0	0	0	0	0	0	0	0	0	0
Career		85	401	285	116	7.0	5	6	0	3	53	18	30	1	12

== Personal life ==
Butler studied business and construction management at the University of Washington. After retiring in 2017, he returned to complete his studies, graduating in 2018. His mom, Janet Rice, has been in the housing and finance industries for a number of years. Her career path spurred his interest in the business side of construction and real estate development. Butler completed his master's degree in real estate at Georgetown University in 2022.
