= Ian Hecox =

American internet personality (born 1987)

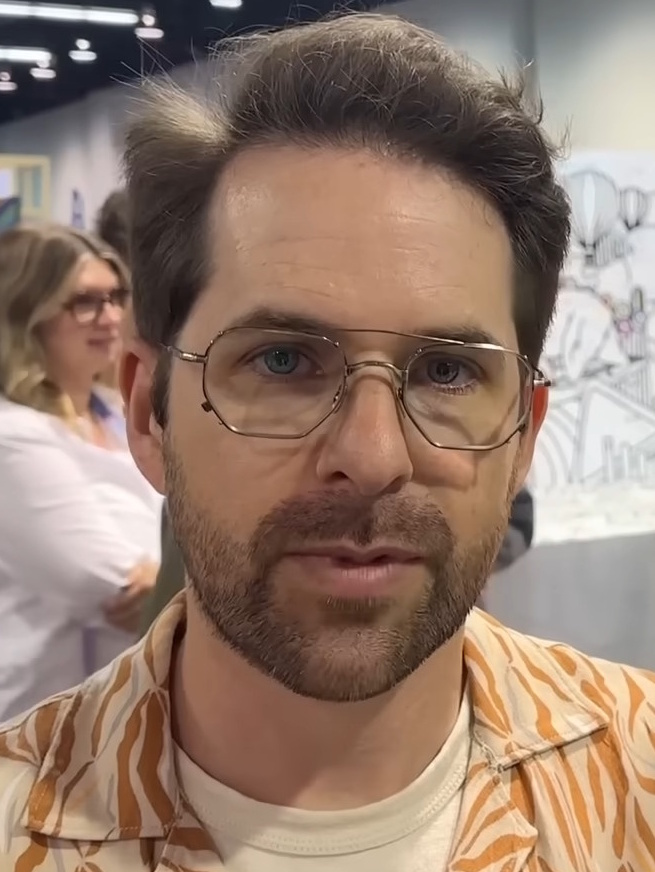
- Hecox in 2025
- Born: Ian Andrew Hecox; November 30, 1987 (age 38); Sacramento, California, U.S.
- Education: Del Campo High School; American River College (dropped out)
- Height: 5 ft 9 in (175 cm)

YouTube information
- Years active: 2005–present

Ian Andrew Hecox (/hiːkɒks/ HEE-koks; born November 30, 1987) is an American YouTuber, comedian, filmmaker, and actor. With Anthony Padilla, he co-founded the YouTube-based video production company Smosh. Hecox has written, directed, and starred in the company's sketch comedy videos since 2005.

== Early life ==
Ian Andrew Hecox was born on November 30, 1987, in Sacramento, California and grew up in the suburb of Carmichael, California. His parents are Sharon and Stephan Andrew Hecox, and he has an older sister named Megan. His mother appeared as a recurring character in various Smosh sketches. Hecox attended Del Campo High School and did cross-country. He attended American River College where he took screenwriting, film and improv classes, before dropping out to focus on Smosh two years later.

== Career ==
=== Smosh ===
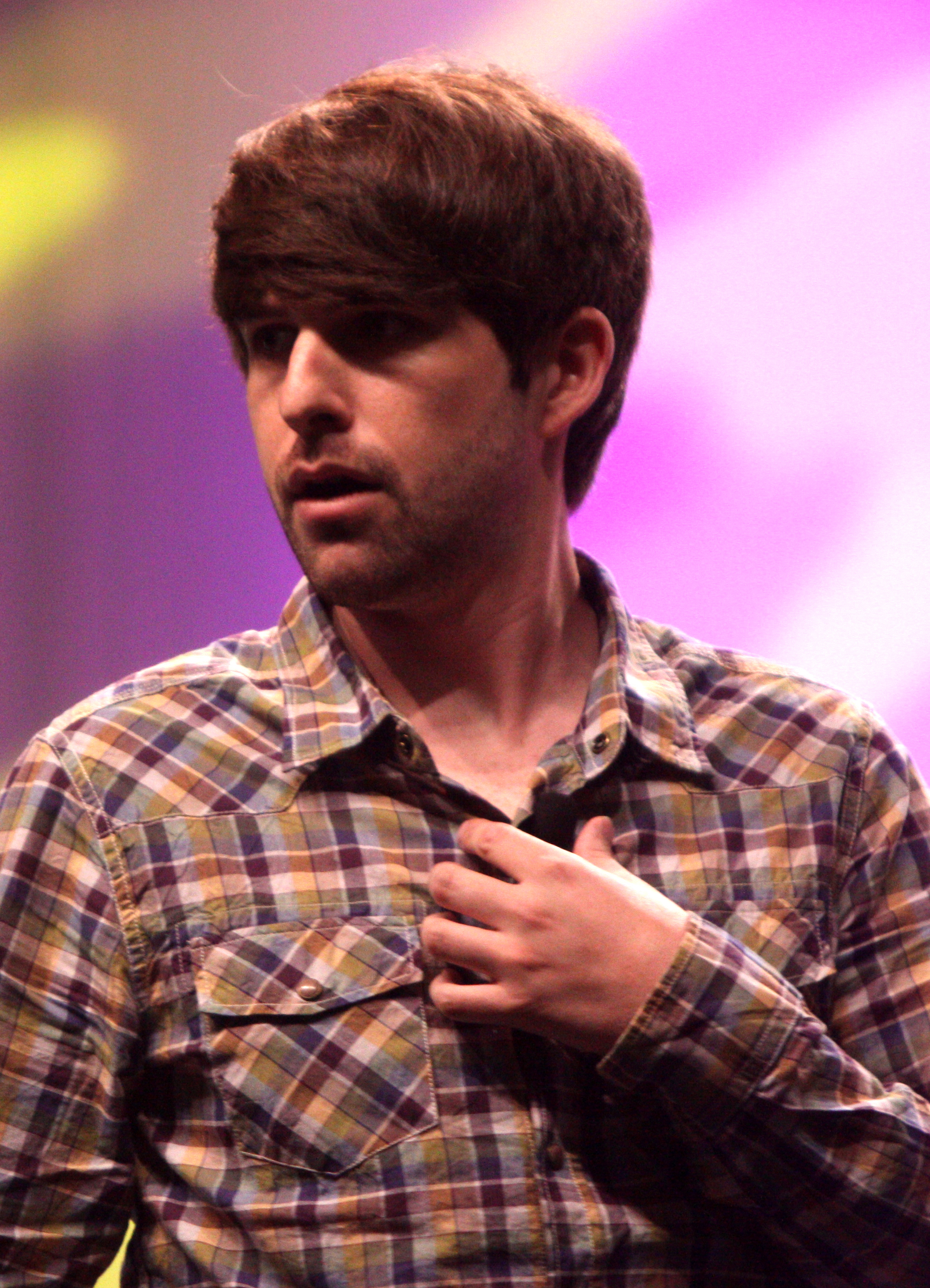
Hecox at VidCon in 2012

In 2002, Hecox joined smosh.com, a website created by his friend since sixth grade, Anthony Padilla. Hecox and Padilla made the Smosh (main) YouTube channel in 2005 and first uploaded several lip sync videos to popular theme songs. It was their lip sync video to the Pokémon Theme, uploaded on November 28, 2005, that became the most-viewed YouTube video for a time (later surpassed by Judson Laipply's Evolution of Dance) until it was eventually taken down due to copyright infringement after surpassing 24 million views.

They shifted to making sketch comedy skits, such as the Food Battle and If It Were Real series. The viral videos helped Smosh become the most-subscribed YouTube channel on three separate occasions. Before the third such occasion, Smosh was acquired by Defy Media (then Alloy Digital) in 2011. Hecox created an individual channel in 2006, "IanH" (now Smosh Pit), which became Smosh's second channel for behind-the-scenes videos and series such as "Lunchtime with Smosh" and his own series "Ian Is Bored". Hecox also ventured into feature film with Smosh, co-producing and acting in the films Smosh: The Movie (2015) and Ghostmates (2016).

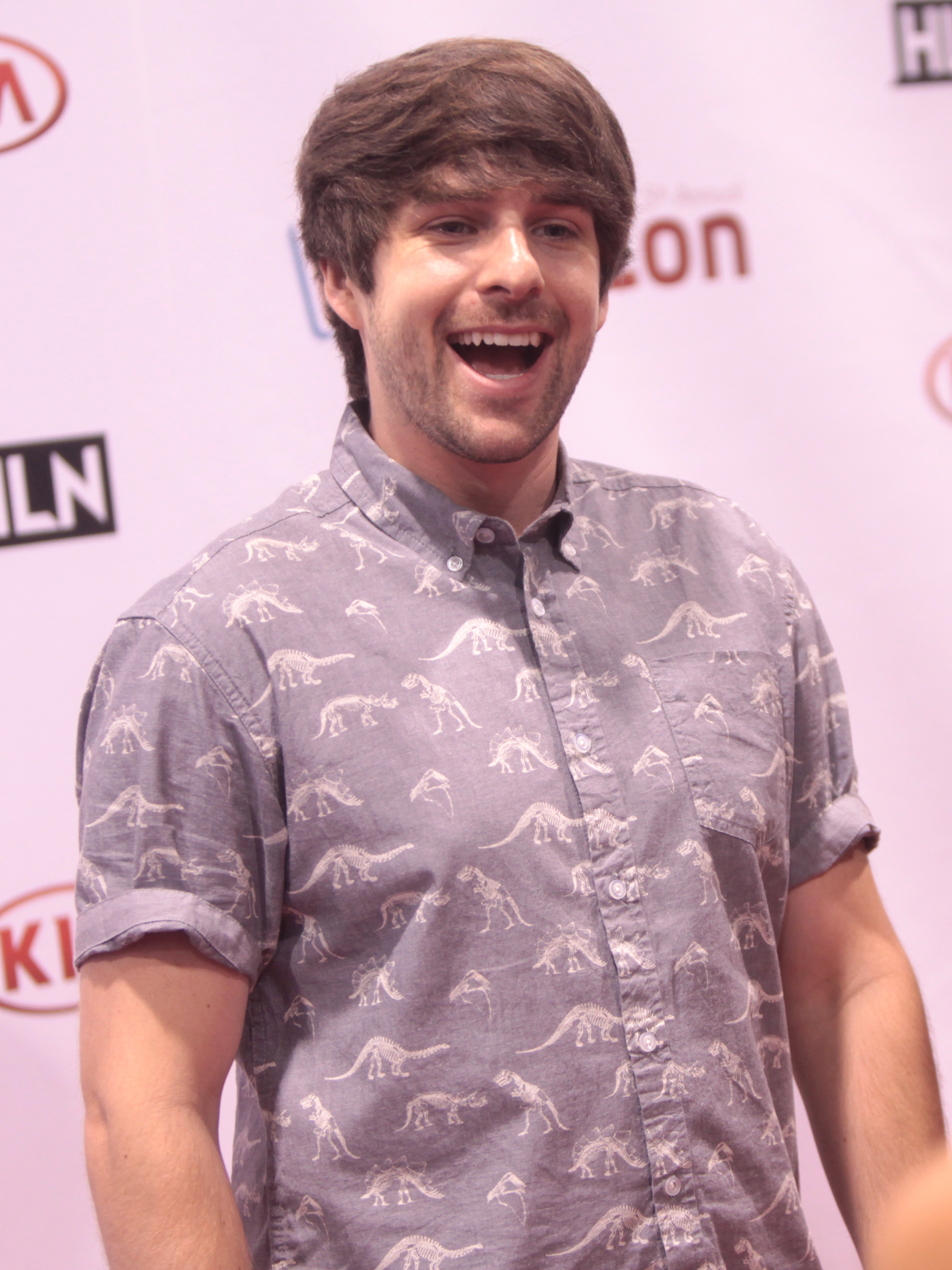
Hecox at VidCon in 2014

Despite the growth and expansion the channel had undergone, Padilla left Smosh in 2017 to focus on independent ventures. Hecox continued Smosh in his absence, stating, "I'm really looking forward to taking Smosh to the next phase, and we can't wait for people to see what we have coming up." He and Padilla publicly assured that they had remained friends following the latter's departure, although Hecox would later claim that their friendship was actually strained until they reconnected in 2022. Hecox remained the only original member of Smosh since its inception and was credited for continuing the success of the channel. JJ Rankin of Screen Rant wrote of his role as a comedian that he "balances both exaggerated and muted humor scenes effortlessly and can engage audiences with his self-aware comedy."

After Padilla's departure, Hecox became more involved with the business aspects of the channel. When Defy Media shut down in 2018, Hecox was left to find new investors to keep the channel going. In February 2019, Smosh was bought by Rhett & Link, (as a part of Mythical Entertainment) who remained the owners until June 20, 2023, when Hecox, alongside freshly returned Padilla, announced that they had reacquired Smosh and would be an independent channel once again.

=== Outside Smosh ===
Hecox was a producer for the web series Krogzilla, and was also an executive producer for the series Oishi High School Battle, for 23 episodes between 2012 and 2014. Hecox acted in The Angry Birds Movie (2016) and Hedgehogs (2017). In 2016, Hecox made a guest appearance on an episode of Chelsea. He also hosted a weekly series for the streaming service Crackle in 2017, and starred in the Tastemade cooking series "Sunday at Nana's" in 2019. He will reprise his role in the upcoming The Angry Birds Movie 3 (2026) after being absent from its predecessor due to Anthony's initial departure from Smosh.

== Filmography ==
=== Film ===
Year	Film	Role	Notes	Ref.
2015	Smosh: The Movie	Himself	Main role	
2016	The Angry Birds Movie	Bubbles	Voice	
2016	Hal and Bubbles	Bubbles	Voice; short film	
2016	Hedgehogs	Maddox	Voice; English dub	
2016	Ghostmates	Eddie Clayton	Main role	
2016	Arctic Adventure: On Frozen Pond	One-Eye	Voice; English dub	
2026	The Angry Birds Movie 3 †	Bubbles	Voice	

=== Television ===
Year	Film	Role	Notes	Ref.
2014	Awesomeness TV	Himself	Episode: Tangent Girl: The Machine	
2015	Ridiculousness	Himself	Episode: Smosh	
2016	Chelsea	Himself		
2016	Scare PewDiePie	Himself	Episode: "Naughty Pie"	
2017	This Week On	Himself		
2026	Helluva Boss	Homie Joey	Episode: “Turtle Emoji”	

=== Web ===
Year	Film	Role	Notes	Ref.
2005–present	Smosh	Himself, various characters		
2010	Agents of Secret Stuff	Student	nigahiga YouTube Movie	
2013	Ray William Johnson	Himself	Episode: "RWJ vs Smosh"	
2014	Epic Rap Battles of History	Michelangelo	Episode: "Artists vs TMNT"	
2016	Part Timers	Ian	Main role	
2011–2015, 2017	YouTube Rewind	Himself	YouTube Rewind 2011, "Rewind YouTube Style 2012", "What Does 2013 Say?", "Turn Down for 2014", "Now Watch Me 2015”, "The Shape of 2017"	
