= Anthony Padilla =

American YouTuber (born 1986)

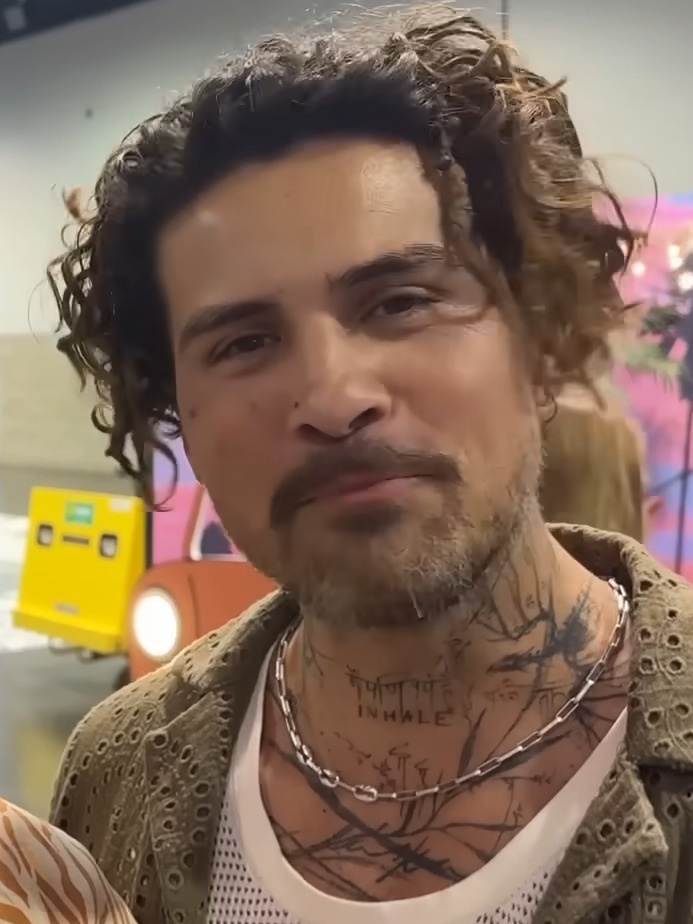
- Padilla in 2025
- Born: Daniel Anthony Padilla; September 16, 1987 (age 39); Sacramento, California, U.S.
- Education: Del Campo High School; American River College (dropped out)
- Occupations: Internet personality; comedian; filmmaker; actor

YouTube information
- Channel: SmoshAlike
- Years active: 2005–present
- Subscribers: 7.55 million
- Views: 1.502 billion
- Last updated: April 23, 2026

Daniel Anthony Padilla (/pəˈdiːjə/ pə-DEE-yə; born September 16, 1987) is an American YouTuber. With Ian Hecox, he co-founded the YouTube-based video production company Smosh. Padilla and Hecox wrote, directed, and starred in sketch comedy videos from 2005 to 2017; after a six-year departure, Padilla returned to the company in 2023.

Outside of Smosh, Padilla hosts the podcast series I Spent a Day With... on SmoshAlike, which was originally his solo channel. He made his film debut in Smosh: The Movie in 2015, and had a voice role in the Angry Birds films starting with The Angry Birds Movie (2016).

== Early life ==
Daniel Anthony Padilla was born on September 16, 1987, in Sacramento, California, and raised in the suburb of Carmichael, California. His father is of Filipino descent and his mother is German. His parents separated when he was two, and he was raised mostly by his mother alongside his two younger half-brothers. As his mother has severe agoraphobia, she was unable to work or even leave the family home, resulting in the family surviving off food stamps; Padilla took on a great deal of responsibility from an early age, especially after his grandmother, who was the primary caretaker of the family, died. He graduated from Del Campo High School and attended American River College for two years before dropping out due to Smosh's success.

== Career ==
=== Smosh ===
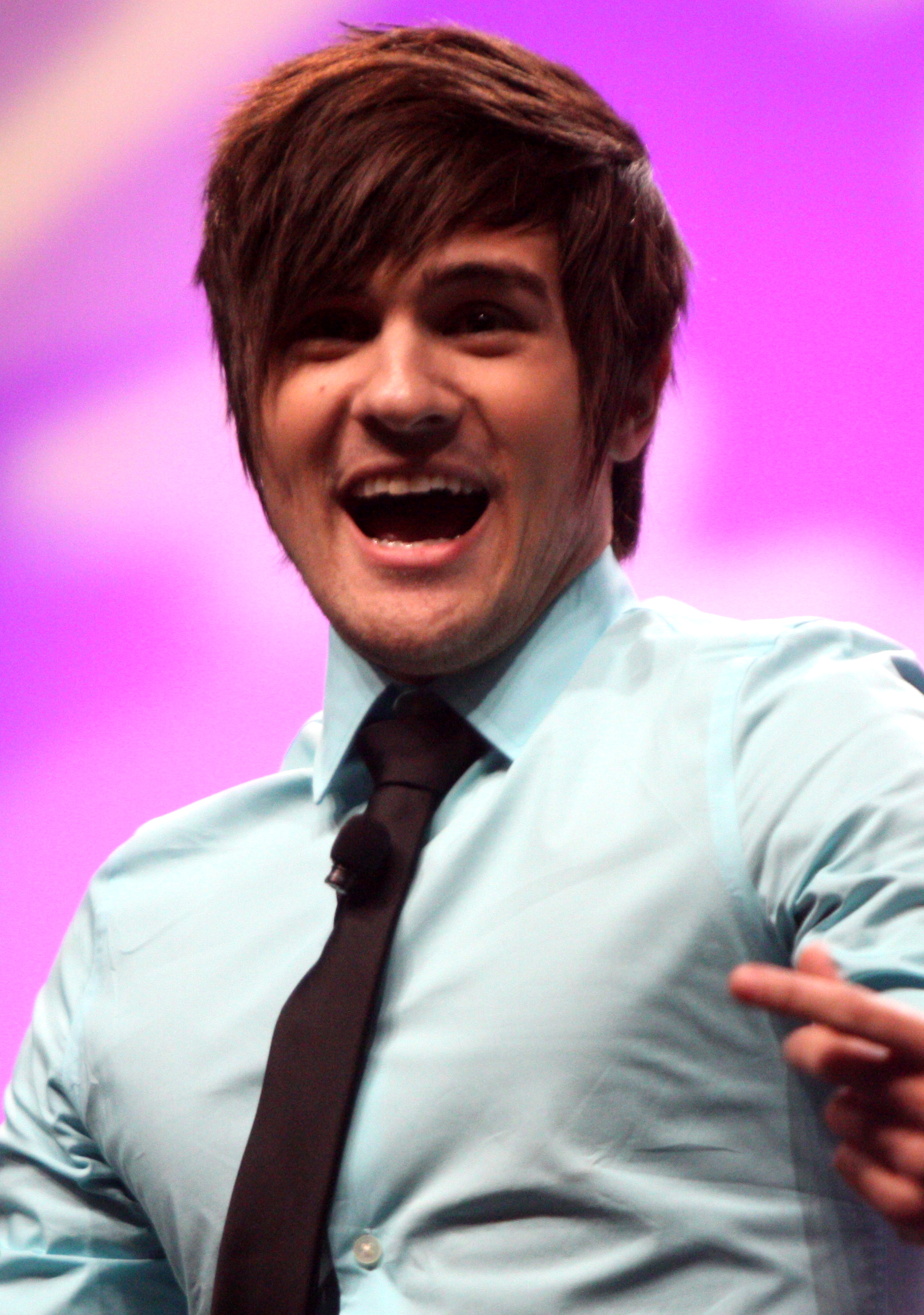
Padilla at VidCon in 2012

In 2002, Padilla registered smosh.com, where he posted Adobe Flash animations. It also functioned effectively as an early form of social media, where he would communicate with his friends while bedridden with Henoch–Schönlein purpura. He has stated that the name "Smosh" came from an incident where he mistook a friend explaining a mosh pit as a "smosh pit". He was later joined by his friend, Ian Hecox, whom he first met in their sixth grade science class, when the two quickly discovered their shared interest in comedy. They joined YouTube in 2005, making several videos together. Many of their early videos were of them lip syncing, including to the theme songs of Mortal Kombat, Power Rangers, and Teenage Mutant Ninja Turtles.

One of Smosh's earliest videos, "Pokémon Theme Music Video," was released on November 28, 2005. It followed the same style as their other earlier videos, with the duo lip-synching the original English theme song for the Pokémon anime. The video became much more popular than any of their other videos. It became one of the most-viewed videos on YouTube at that time, but was removed for being a copyright violation. They later started focusing more on short comedy skits.

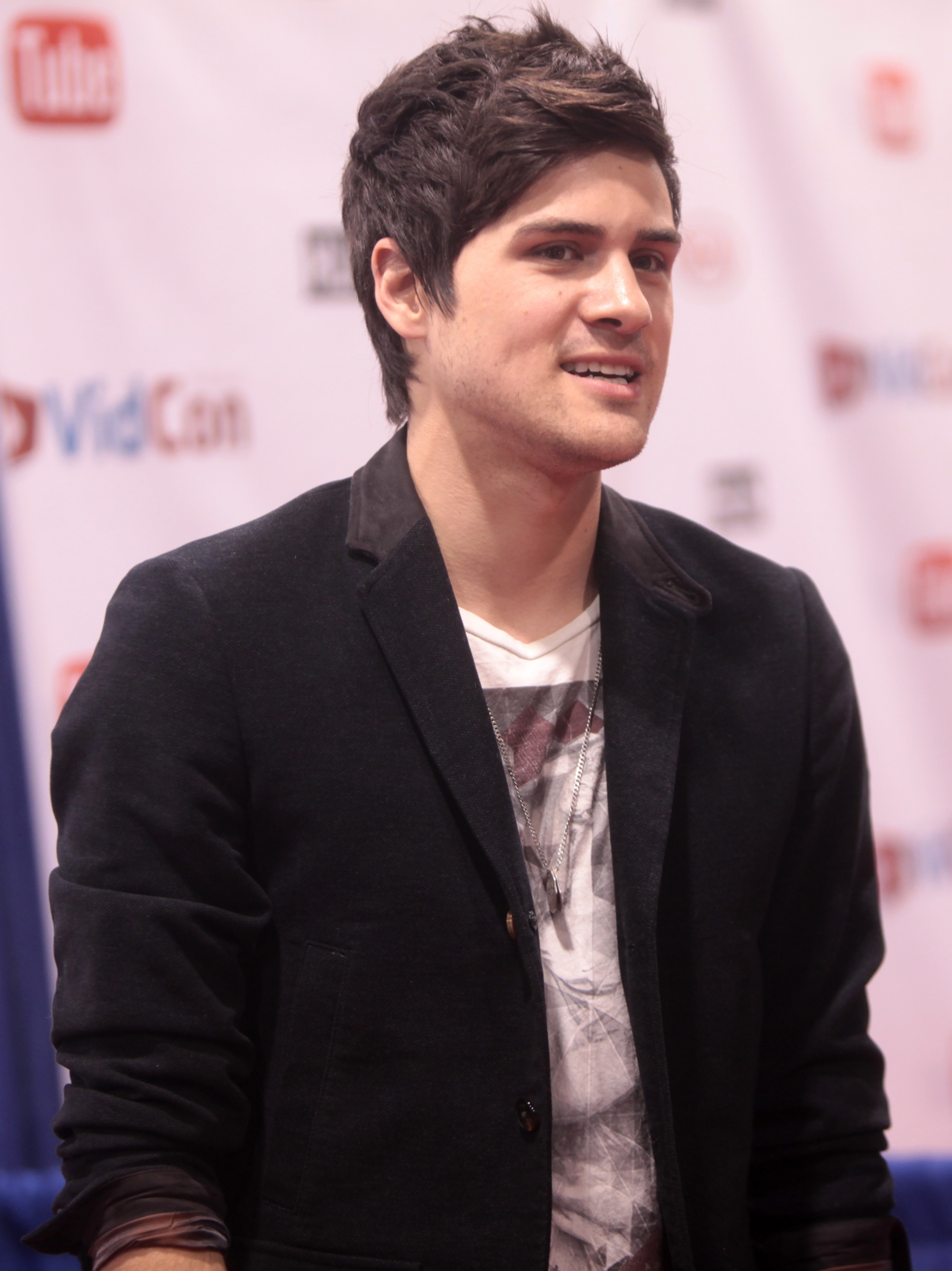
Padilla at Vidcon in 2014

=== Leaving Smosh ===
Smosh was acquired by Defy Media in 2011, who remained the owner until it shut down in 2018. Padilla left in June 2017, making the announcement on his personal YouTube channel. He mentioned a "lack of creative freedom." Following the liquidation of Defy Media in November 2018, he claimed that the company had attempted to steal his social network pages and prevented him from joining SAG-AFTRA after he departed from the company. Mythical Entertainment would later acquire the Smosh brand on February 22, 2019.

=== Reunion and owning Smosh ===
Alongside Hecox, Padilla announced on June 20, 2023, that the duo had bought a majority stake in Smosh from Mythical Entertainment and would be rebooting the main channel to create their own sketches, similar to those in the early years of the channel. In an interview with Variety regarding the acquisition, Padilla expressed his desire to "return to [their] roots" by owning the company so that they "[could] really take Smosh in any creative direction".

=== Outside Smosh ===
Since his initial departure from Smosh in 2017, Padilla has found continued success on his personal YouTube channel, which he later renamed SmoshAlike after returning to Smosh. He created a series of videos titled I Spent a Day With..., interviewing people based on their experiences with various topics. Padilla stated that he uses the series as a way to have in-depth conversations with people who tend to be left out; he wanted to avoid "poking fun at people, cringe reaction humor-type stuff." For his work, he has been described as "YouTube's Interview King" by The Washington Post. He has interviewed people such as then-YouTube CEO Susan Wojcicki, fellow viral internet personalities including Tay Zonday, American YouTuber Dream, and American musician Corpse Husband. His other subjects included furries, ex-cult members, and survivors of police brutality and school shootings.

In 2020, Padilla founded Pressalike, Inc. to develop and create a slate of unscripted content. The company currently produces the I Spent a Day With... series. In 2025, Padilla announced that Pressalike is now under the Smosh umbrella, rebranded to Smoshalike.

== Filmography ==
=== Film ===
Key
†	Denotes films that have not yet been released

Year	Film	Role	Notes	Ref.
2015	Smosh: The Movie	Himself	Also executive producer	
2016	The Angry Birds Movie	Hal	Voice	
2016	Hal and Bubbles	Hal	Voice; short film	
2016	Hedgehogs	Bobby	Voice	
2016	Ghostmates	Charlie	Also executive producer	
2019	The Angry Birds Movie 2	Hal	Voice	
2026	The Angry Birds Movie 3 †	Hal	Voice	

=== Television ===
Year	Film	Role	Notes	Ref.
2014	AwesomenessTV	Himself	Episode: "Tangent Girl: The Machine"	
2015	Ridiculousness	Himself	Episode: "Smosh"	
2016	Scare PewDiePie	Himself	Episode: "Naughty Pie"	
2016	Chelsea	Himself		
2018	RuPaul's Drag Race	Himself	Episode: "Social Media Kings Into Queens"	
2026	Helluva Boss	Jordie Jordan	Episode: “Turtle Emoji”	

=== Web ===
Year	Film	Role	Notes	Ref.
2005–2017; 2023–present	Smosh	Himself, various characters		
2013	Ray William Johnson	Himself	Episode: "RWJ vs Smosh"	
2014	Epic Rap Battles of History	Raphael	Episode: "Artists vs TMNT"	
2016	Part Timers	Anton	Main role	
2012–2015, 2017	YouTube Rewind	Himself	5 episodes	
