= YouTuber =

Creator producing YouTube videos

A YouTuber is a content creator who uploads or creates short- or long-form videos on the online video-sharing website or app YouTube, typically posting to their personal YouTube channel. The term "YouTuber" was first used in the English language in 2006, and subsequently appeared in the 2006 Time Person of the Year issue.

== Influence ==
Influential YouTubers are sometimes described as microcelebrities. Since YouTube is widely conceived as a bottom-up social media video platform, microcelebrities do not appear to be involved with the established and commercial system of celebrity culture; rather, they appear self-governed and independent. This appearance, in turn, leads to YouTubers being seen as more relatable and authentic, also fostered by the direct connection between artist and viewer using the medium of YouTube.

In 2014, the University of Southern California surveyed 13–18-year-olds in the United States on whether ten YouTube celebrities or ten traditional celebrities were more influential; YouTube personalities took the first five spots of the ranking, with the YouTube duo Smosh ranking as most influential. The survey was repeated in 2015, and found six YouTubers on the first ranks, with KSI ranked as most influential. Several YouTubers and their influence were subjects for scientific studies, such as Zoella, and PewDiePie. Numerous studies in the late 2010s found that being a YouTuber was the most desired career by children.

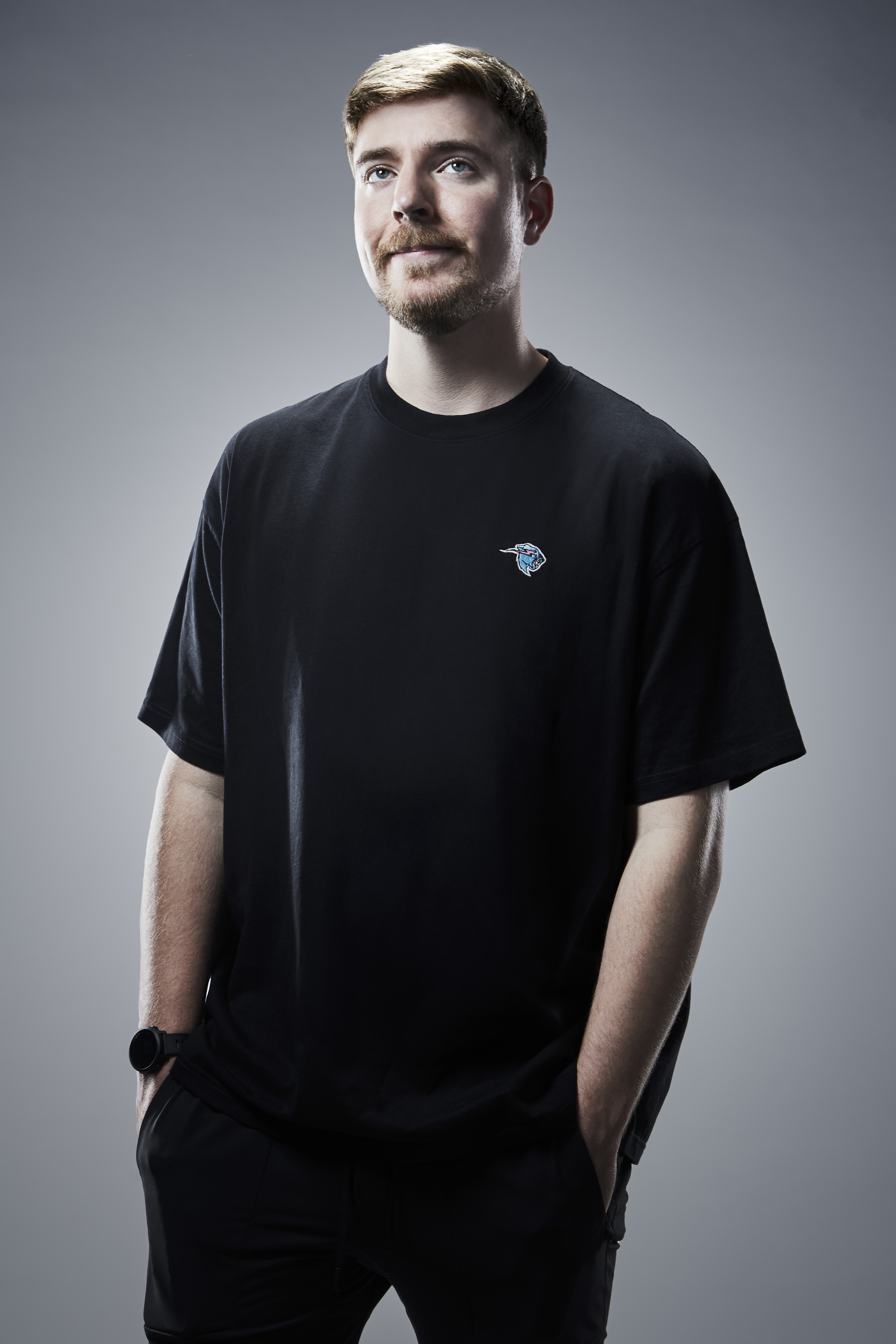
MrBeast is the most-subscribed YouTuber on the platform, with over 500 million subscribers.

YouTubers' influence has also extended beyond the platform. Some have ventured into mainstream forms of media, such as Liza Koshy, who, among other pursuits, hosted the revival of the Nickelodeon show Double Dare and starred in the Netflix dance-comedy film Work It. Syrian-Emirati YouTuber, Hayla Ghazal, opened two fashion boutiques as a result of her online success. In 2019, Ryan's Mystery Playdate, a show starring Ryan Kaji, the then-seven-year-old host of the toy review and vlog channel Ryan's World, began airing on the Nick Jr. Channel; later that year, NBC debuted A Little Late with Lilly Singh in its 1:35 am ET time slot. Singh's digital prominence was cited as a reason for her selection as host by then-NBC Entertainment co-chairman George Cheeks.

In 2024, Canadian YouTuber Jasmeet Singh Raina, otherwise known as JusReign, released his half-hour comedy series titled Late Bloomer. In 2025, Italian YouTuber Panda boi was awarded the Grand Prix Award at Cannes Festival.

In addition to expanding into other forms of media, several YouTubers have used their influence to raise money for charity or speak out on social issues. Notable examples include James Stephen "MrBeast" Donaldson and Mark Rober, who helped raise over $20 million with their Team Trees campaign, and Felipe Neto, who publicly criticized Brazilian president Jair Bolsonaro for his response to the COVID-19 pandemic. In 2020, Time named Neto and fellow YouTuber JoJo Siwa to its annual list of the world's 100 most influential people.

Research suggests political YouTubers can have a highly "disruptive" influence in mainstream television news. This includes in 2018, when YouTuber Ash Sarkar, of the Novara Media channel, experienced a "rapid rise" to fame by calling Piers Morgan an "idiot" - breaking with the norms of behavior on Good Morning Britain (ITV) whereby guests defer to his "authority." She later appeared on Newsnight (BBC) in which she broke with the program's "unreservedly respectful coverage" of the Royal family by referring to them as "weird people."

Due to this level of influence, in 2013, University of Michigan associate professor Robert Hovden argued for the creation of a new index similar to the g-index and h-index to evaluate a person's output and impact on YouTube.

== Monetization ==
Total annual earnings of the top ten YouTuber accounts, and the income of the single highest-earning account

YouTubers can earn revenue from Google AdSense. Additionally, they can supplement their income through affiliate links, merchandising, and 3rd party memberships using platforms such as Patreon. Popular channels have garnered corporate sponsors, who pay to be included in the videos. In 2018, Walmart, Nordstrom, and others sought YouTube stars as influencers.

In the early days of YouTube, there was no way to monetize videos on the platform. Much of the site's content was homemade and produced by hobbyists with no plans for making money on the site. The first targeted advertising on the site came in the form of participatory video ads, which were videos in their own right that offered users the opportunity to view exclusive content by clicking on the ad. The first such ad was for the Fox show Prison Break and solely appeared above videos on Paris Hilton's channel. At the time, the channel was operated by Warner Bros. Records and was cited as the first brand channel on the platform. Participatory video ads were designed to link specific promotions to specific channels rather than advertising on the entire platform at once. When the ads were introduced in August 2006, YouTube CEO Chad Hurley rejected the idea of expanding into areas of advertising seen as less user-friendly at the time, saying, "We think there are better ways for people to engage with brands than forcing them to watch a commercial before seeing content. You could ask anyone on the net if they enjoy that experience and they'd probably say no." However, YouTube began running in-video ads in August 2007, with preroll ads introduced in 2008. In December 2007, YouTube launched the Partner Program, which allows channels that meet certain metrics (currently 1000 subscribers and 4000 public watch hours in the past year) to run ads on their videos and earn money doing so. The Partner Program allowed for the first time YouTube personalities to make a living from the platform.

During the 2010s, the ability for YouTubers to achieve wealth and fame due to success on the platform increased dramatically. In December 2010, Business Insider estimated that the highest earner on YouTube during the previous year was Dane Boedigheimer, creator of the web series Annoying Orange, with an annual income of around $257,000. Five years later, Forbes released its first list of the highest-earning YouTube personalities, estimating top earner PewDiePie's income during the previous fiscal year at $12 million, more than some popular actors such as Cameron Diaz or Gwyneth Paltrow. Forbes estimated that the tenth-highest earner that year was Rosanna Pansino at $2.5 million. (Note: In December 2020, Forbes estimated that the highest-earning YouTuber was Ryan Kaji at $29.5 million. The tenth-highest was Jeffree Star at $15 million.) That year, NME stated that "vlogging has become big business." The rapid influx of wealth within the YouTube community has led some to criticize YouTubers for focusing on earnings more than the creativity and connection with their fanbase that some claim was at the heart of the platform before expanded monetization. In August 2021, it was reported Kevin Paffrath made $5 million in just the first 3 months of 2021, and his YouTube analytics showed he made "several million" in ad revenue within the prior 12 months. By 2021, YouTuber earnings had expanded even more, with Forbes estimating that the highest earner that year was MrBeast at $51 million.

== See also ==
- List of YouTubers
- List of most-subscribed YouTube channels
- List of most-viewed YouTube channels
- VTuber – Streamers that use virtual avatars
- YouTube Creator Awards
- YouTuber film
- Online streamer
