= The Amazing Race 28 =

Season of television series

- Season 28
- Region 1 DVD cover
- Presented by: Phil Keoghan
- No. of teams: 11
- Winners: Dana Borriello & Matt Steffanina
- No. of legs: 12
- Distance traveled: 27,000 mi (43,000 km)
- No. of episodes: 12

Release
- Original network: CBS
- Original release: February 12 – May 13, 2016

Additional information
- Filming dates: November 15 – December 6, 2015

Series chronology
- ← Previous; Season 27 Next → Season 29

The Amazing Race 28 is the twenty-eighth season of the American reality competition show The Amazing Race. Hosted by Phil Keoghan, it featured eleven teams of two, each with a pre-existing relationship and including at least one notable social media personality, competing in a race around the world to win US$1,000,000. This season visited four continents and ten countries and traveled over 27,000 miles (43,000 km) during twelve legs. Starting from the racers' homes in the United States, racers traveled through Mexico, Colombia, Switzerland, France, Armenia, Georgia, the United Arab Emirates, Indonesia, and China before returning to the United States and finishing in Santa Barbara wine country. New elements introduced in this season include having teams start from their homes instead of a centralized location. The season premiered on CBS on February 12, 2016, and concluded on May 13, 2016.

Engaged choreographers Dana Borriello and Matt Steffanina were the winners of this season, while mother and son pair Sheri and Cole LaBrant finished in second place, and best friends Tyler Oakley and Korey Kuhl finished in third place.

== Format ==
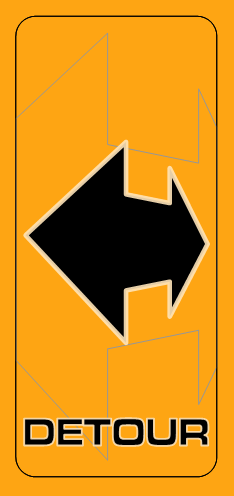
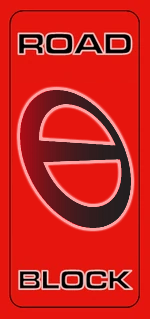
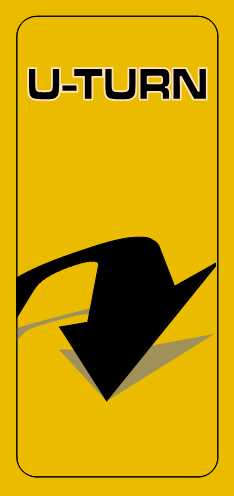
The clues which contestants receive during the course of the race generally fall into four categories: Route Info, Detour, Roadblock, and U-Turn.

The Amazing Race is a reality television show created by Bertram van Munster and Elise Doganieri, and hosted by Phil Keoghan. The series follows teams of two competing in a race around the world. Each leg of the race requires teams to deduce clues, navigate foreign environments, interact with locals, perform physical and mental challenges, and travel on a limited budget provided by the show. At each stop during the leg, teams receive clues inside sealed envelopes, which fall into one of these categories:

- Route Info: These are simple instructions that teams must follow before they can receive their next clue.
- Detour: A Detour is a choice between two tasks. Teams may choose either task and switch tasks if they find one option too difficult. There is usually one Detour present on each leg.
- Roadblock: A Roadblock is a task that only one team member can complete. Teams must choose which member will complete the task based on a brief clue they receive before fully learning the details of the task. There is usually one Roadblock present on each leg.
- U-Turn: The U-Turn allows teams to force another team to complete both options of the Detour before they can continue the race.
- Speed Bump: A penalty for teams who finished in last place on a non-elimination leg. It required the team to complete an additional task in the following leg that only they had to complete.

Most teams who arrive last at the Pit Stop of each leg are progressively eliminated, while the first team to arrive at the finish line in the final episode wins the grand prize of US$1,000,000.

== Contestants ==
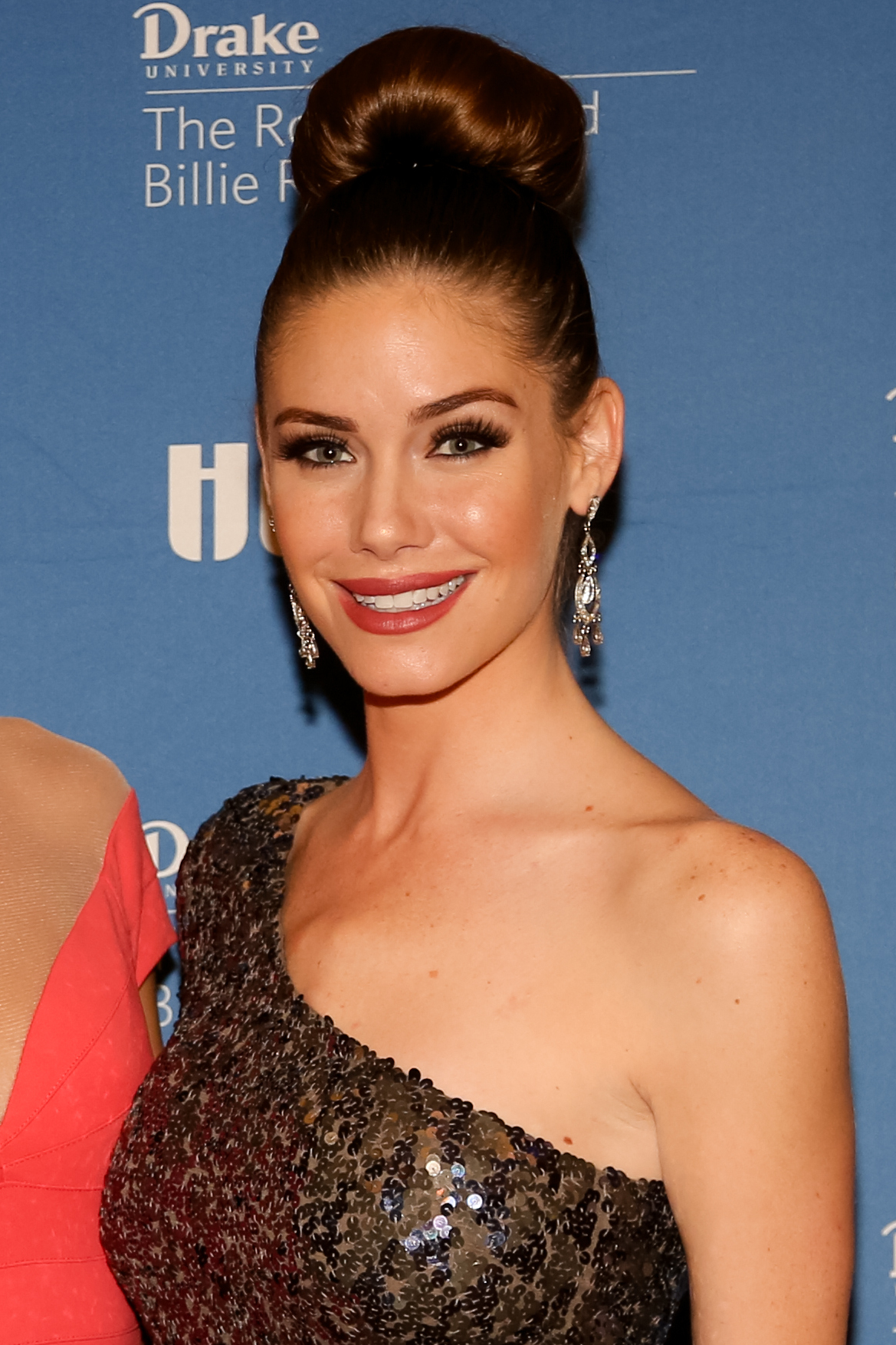
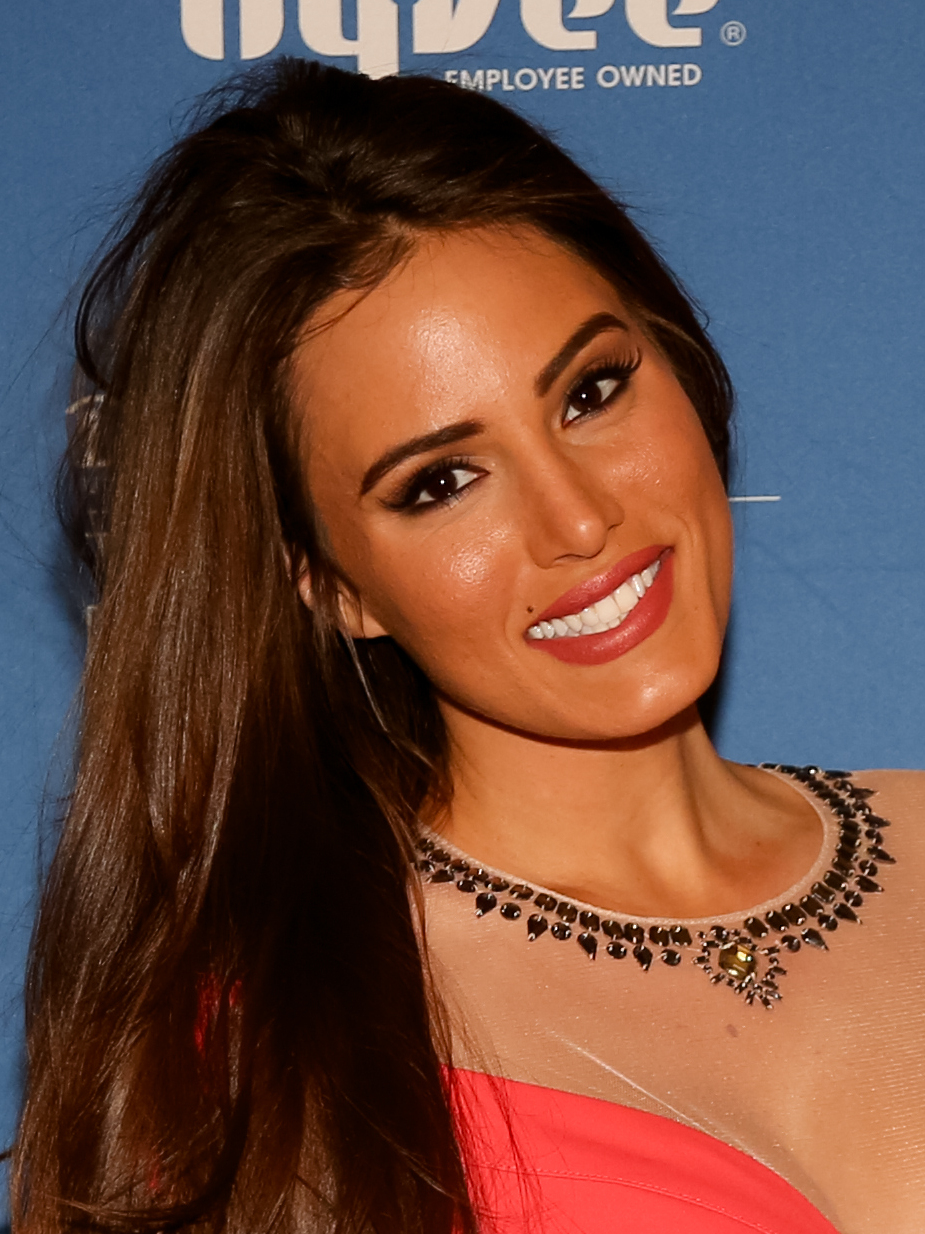
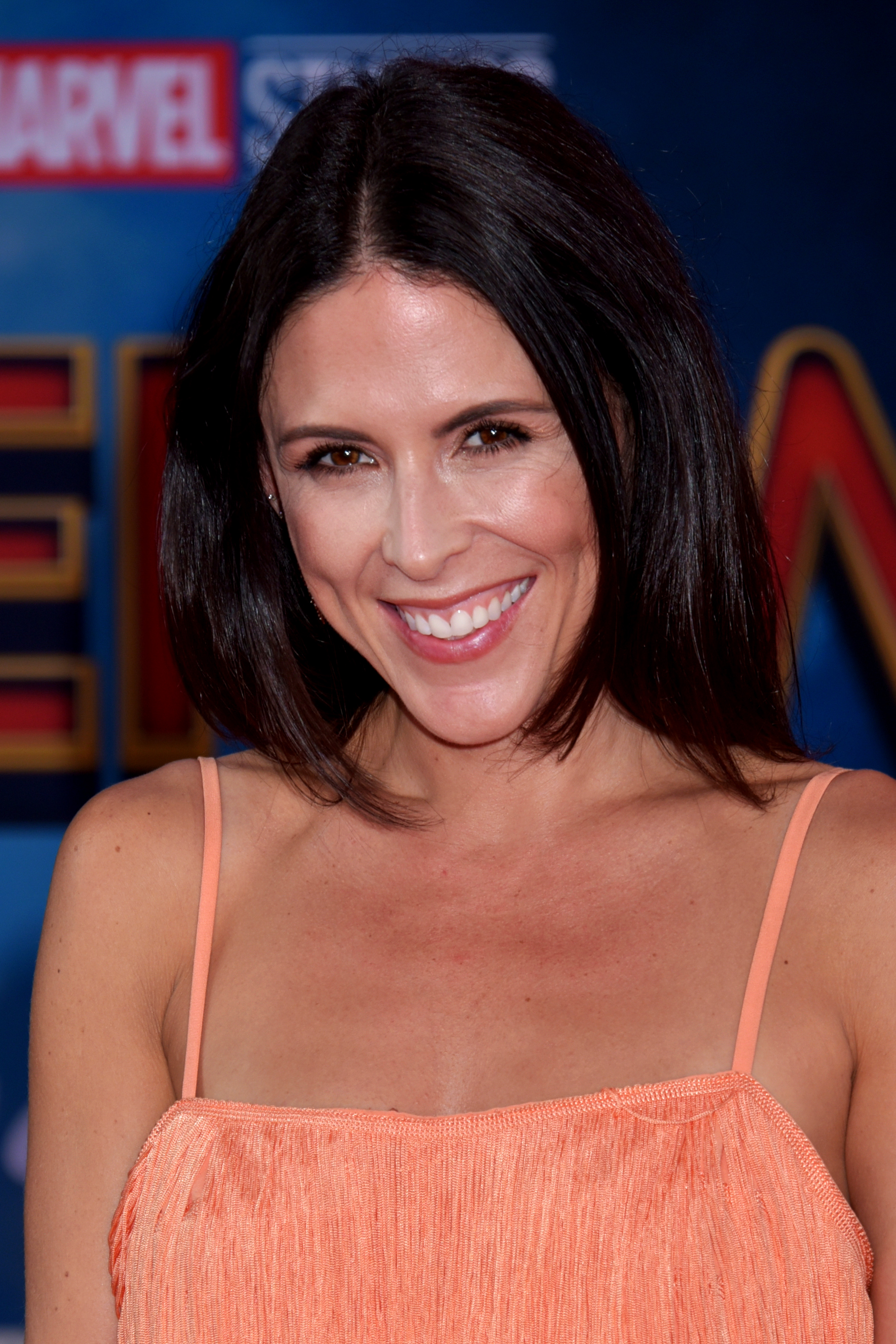
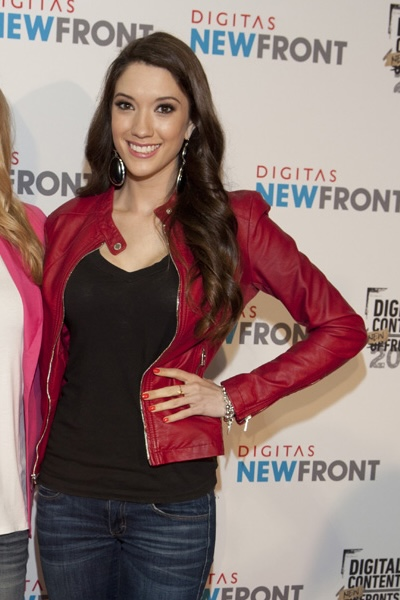
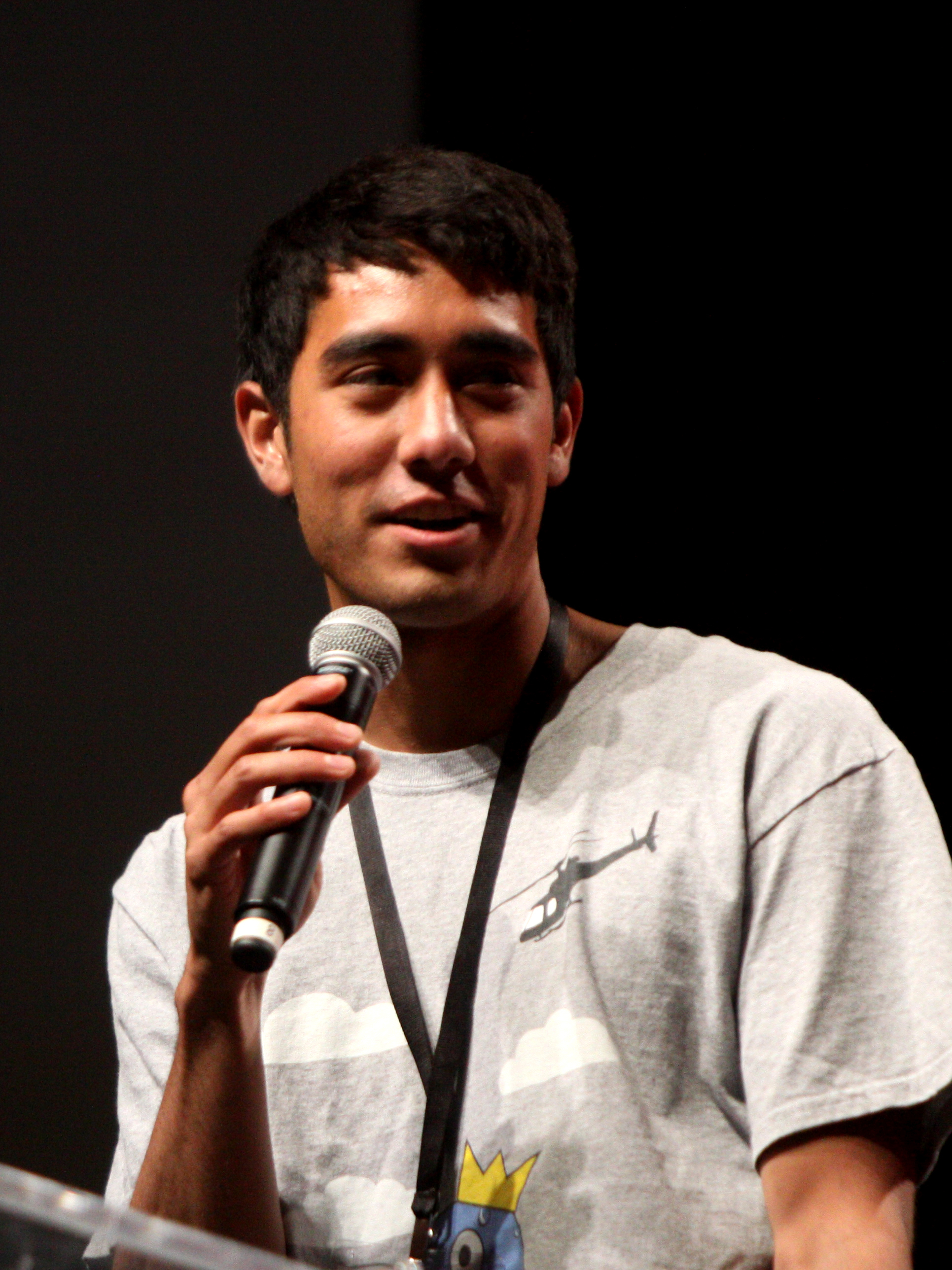
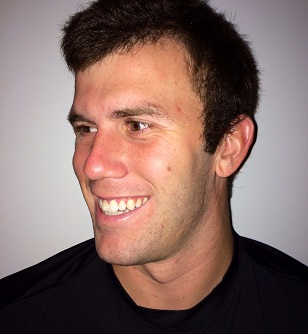
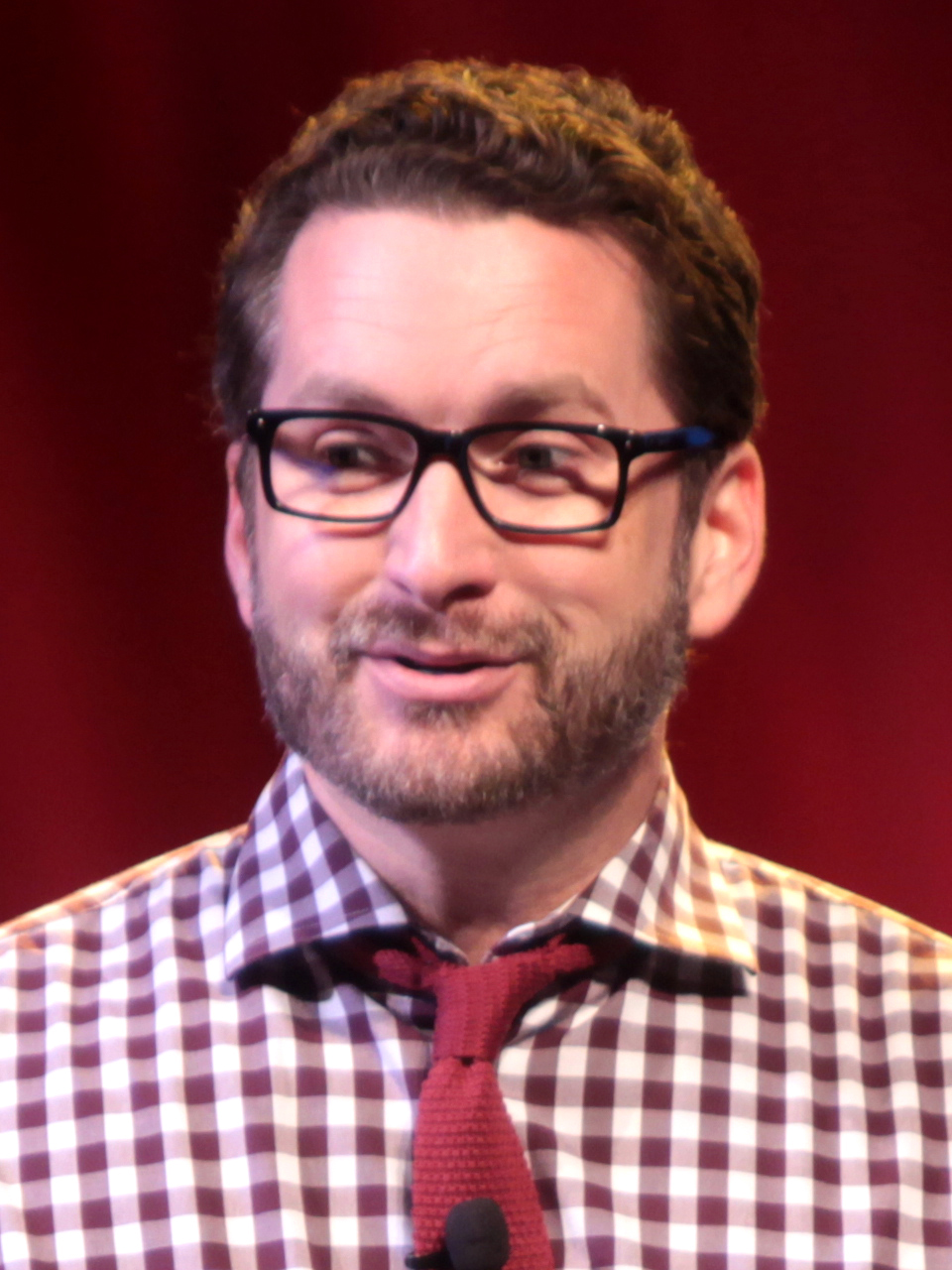
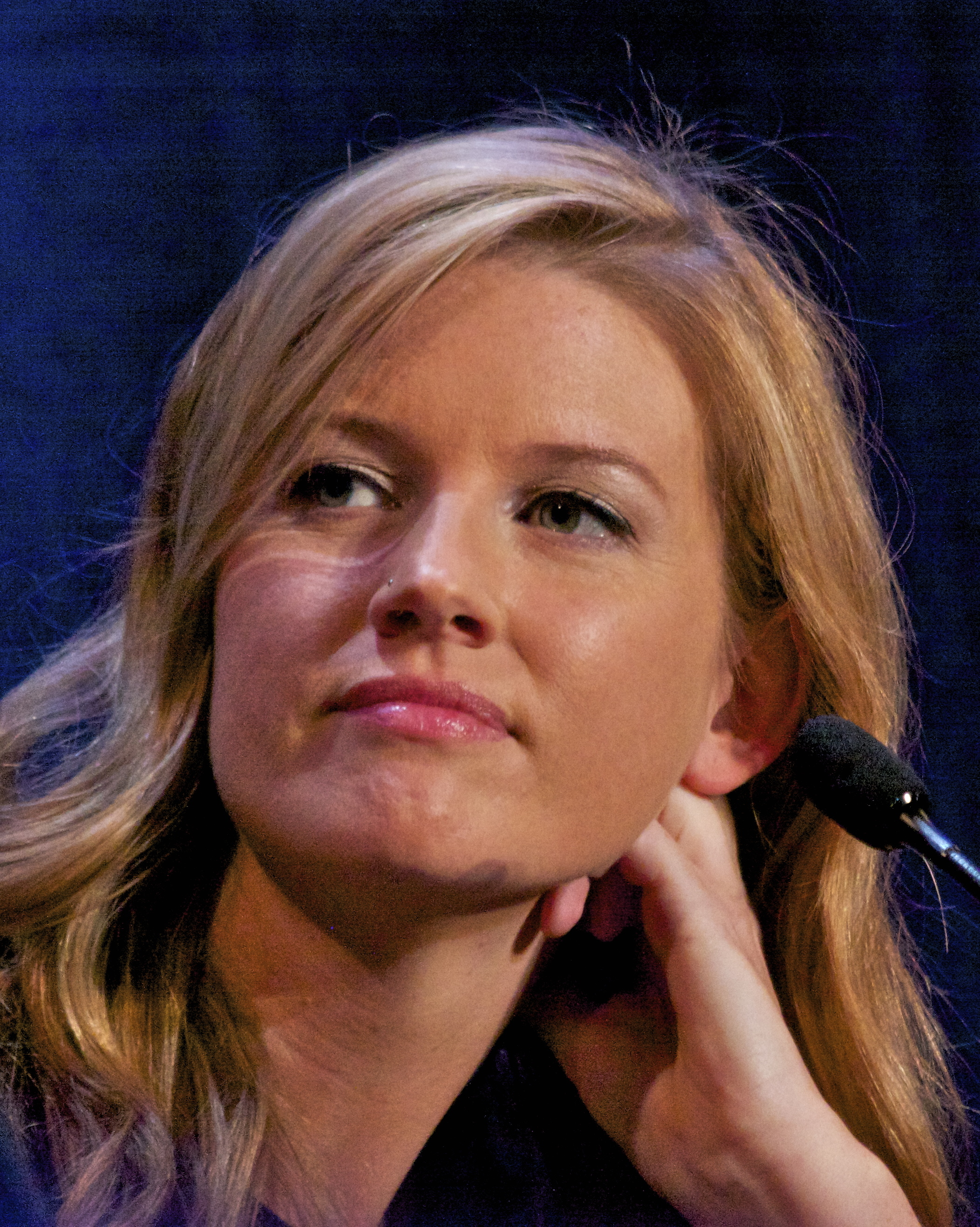
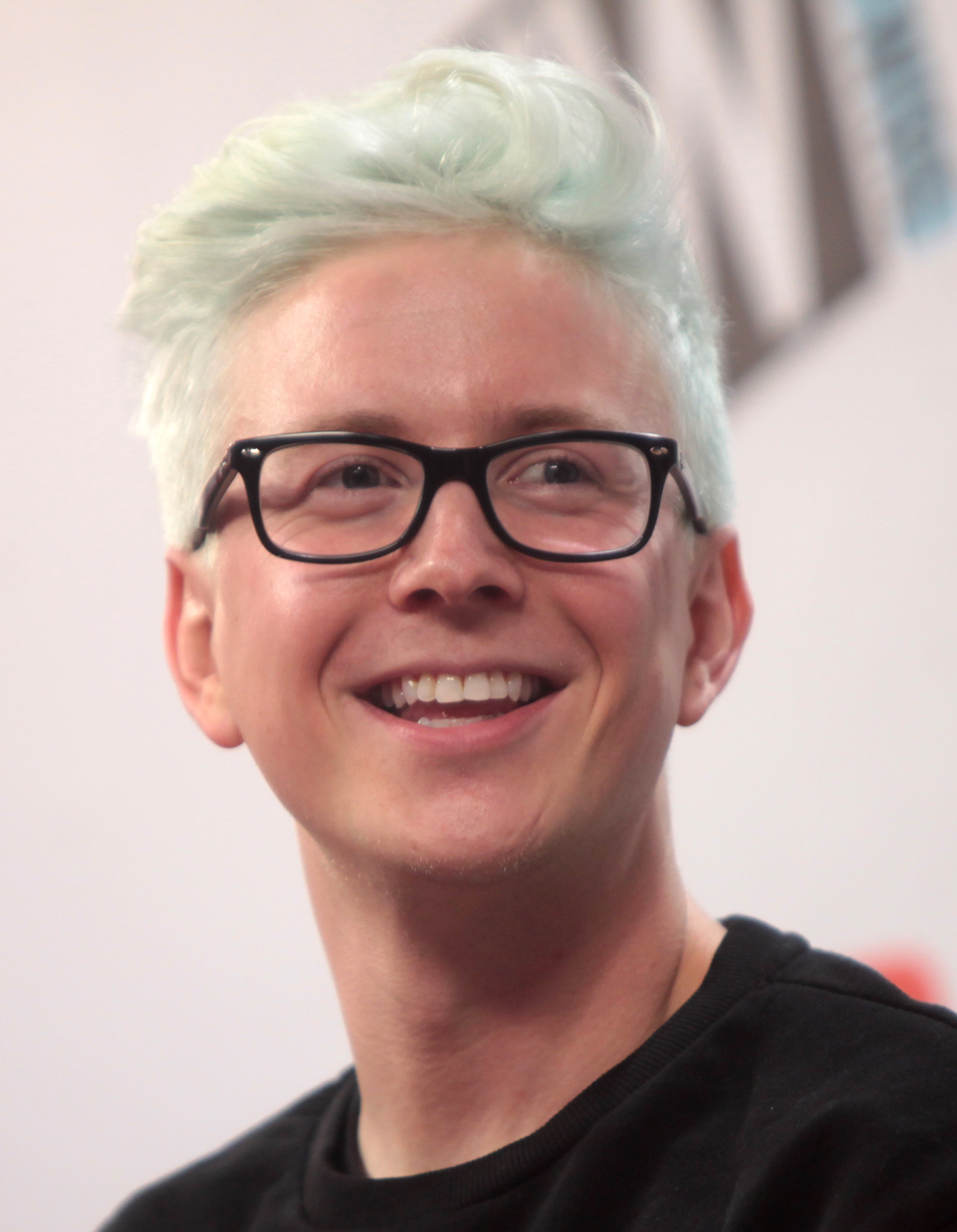
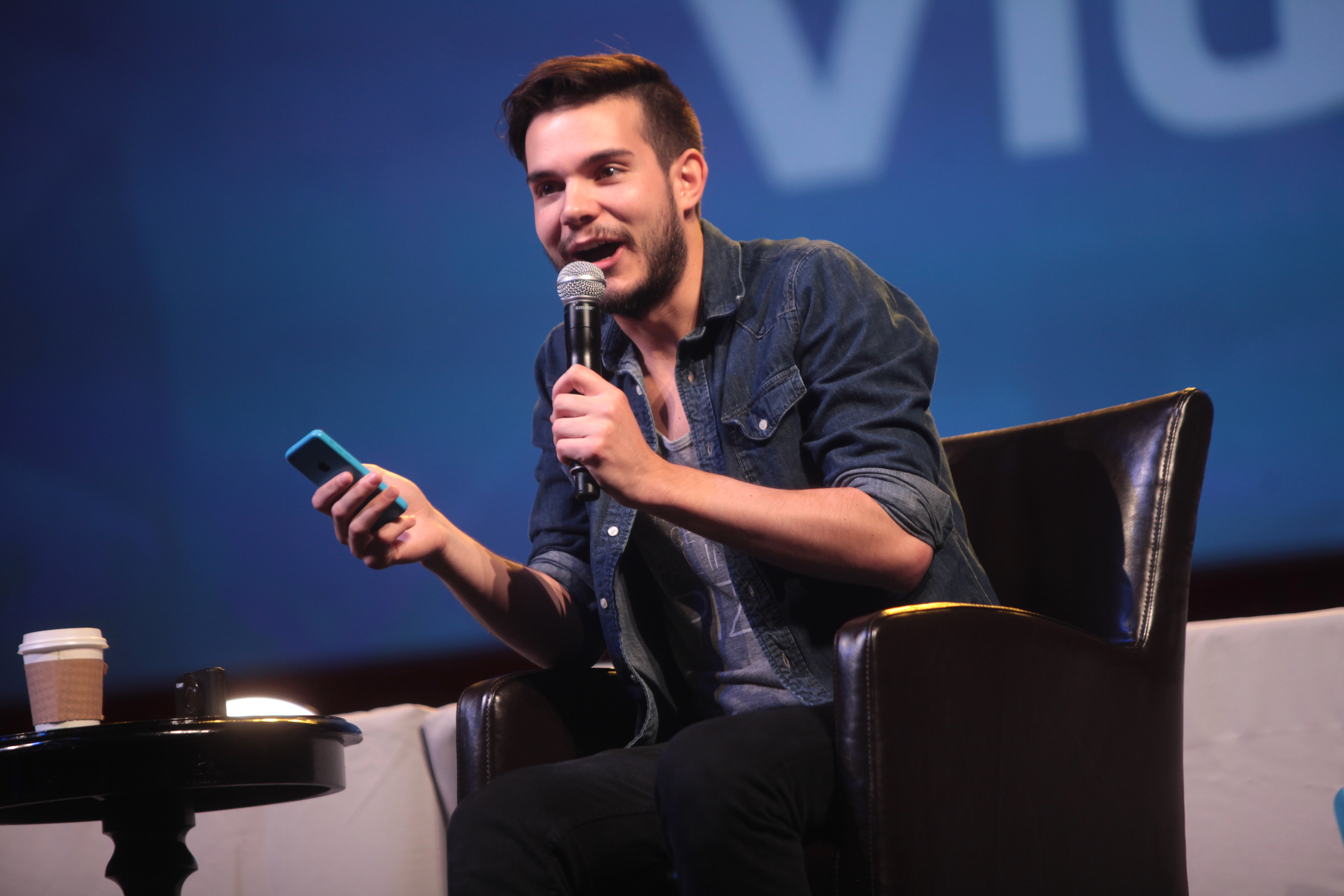
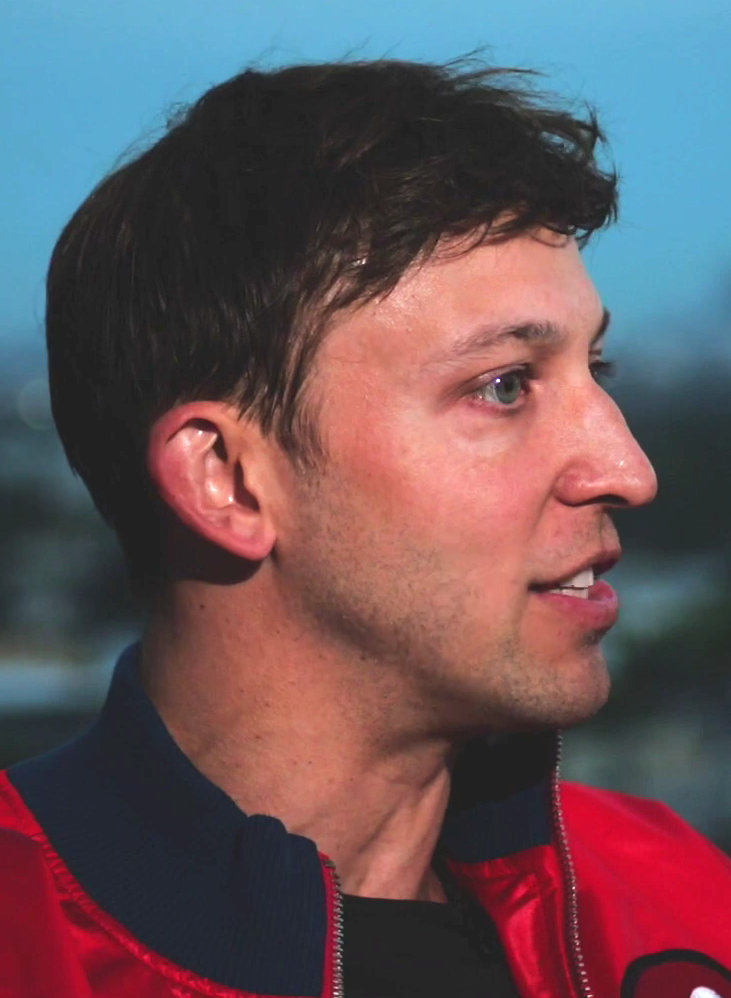
From left to right: Brittany Oldehoff, Jessica VerSteeg, Joslyn Davis, Blair Fowler, Zach King, Brodie Smith, Burnie Burns, Ashley Jenkins, Tyler Oakley, Korey Kuhl, and Matt Steffanina

The cast was announced on November 15, 2015, prior to the start of filming, and consisted of Internet celebrities and their relatives and friends. Most of the cast had achieved prior fame through social media platforms, such as YouTube, Vine, and Instagram.

Contestants	Age	Relationship	Hometown	Status
Marty Cobb	51	Mother & Daughter	McKinney, Texas	Eliminated 1st (in Cartagena, Colombia)
Hagan Parkman	22	Mother & Daughter	McKinney, Texas	Eliminated 1st (in Cartagena, Colombia)
Darius Benson	22	Brothers	Tuscaloosa, Alabama	Eliminated 2nd (in Cartagena, Colombia)
Cameron Benson	19	Brothers	Memphis, Tennessee	Eliminated 2nd (in Cartagena, Colombia)
Brittany Oldehoff	26	Instagram Models	Fort Lauderdale, Florida	Eliminated 3rd (in Chamonix, France)
Jessica Versteeg	28	Instagram Models	San Francisco, California	Eliminated 3rd (in Chamonix, France)
Erin White Robinson	31	Best Friends	Los Angeles, California	Eliminated 4th (in Chamonix, France)
Joslyn Davis	33	Best Friends	Los Angeles, California	Eliminated 4th (in Chamonix, France)
Scott Fowler	58	Father & Daughter	Kingsport, Tennessee	Eliminated 5th (in Tbilisi, Georgia)
Blair Fowler	22	Father & Daughter	San Diego, California	Eliminated 5th (in Tbilisi, Georgia)
Zach King	25	Newlyweds	Los Angeles, California	Eliminated 6th (in Denpasar, Indonesia)
Rachel King	25	Newlyweds	Los Angeles, California	Eliminated 6th (in Denpasar, Indonesia)
Brodie Smith	28	Pro Ultimate Players	Dallas, Texas	Eliminated 7th (in Denpasar, Indonesia)
Kurt Gibson	30	Pro Ultimate Players	Dallas, Texas	Eliminated 7th (in Denpasar, Indonesia)
Burnie Burns	42	Dating Gamers	Austin, Texas	Eliminated 8th (in Shenzhen, China)
Ashley Jenkins	33	Dating Gamers	Austin, Texas	Eliminated 8th (in Shenzhen, China)
Tyler Oakley	26	Best Friends	Jackson, Michigan	Third place
Korey Kuhl	30	Best Friends	Jackson, Michigan	Third place
Sheri LaBrant	45	Mother & Son	Enterprise, Alabama	Runners-up
Cole LaBrant	19	Mother & Son	Enterprise, Alabama	Runners-up
Dana Borriello	29	Engaged Choreographers	Los Angeles, California	Winners
Matt Steffanina	30	Engaged Choreographers	Los Angeles, California	Winners

Future appearances

Tyler & Korey returned to compete on The Amazing Race: Reality Showdown.

On May 25, 2016, Tyler & Korey and Erin & Joslyn appeared on an Amazing Race-themed primetime special episode of The Price Is Right. On August 7, 2018, Tyler & Korey competed together on a social media-themed episode of Fear Factor.

== Contestant progress ==
The following teams are listed with their placements in each leg. Placements are listed in finishing order.

- A red placement with a dagger (†) indicates that the team was eliminated.
- An underlined blue placement with a double-dagger (‡) indicates that the team was the last to arrive at a Pit Stop in a non-elimination leg, and had to perform a Speed Bump task in the following leg.
- An italicized and underlined placement indicates that the team was the last to arrive at a Pit Stop, but there was no rest period at the Pit Stop and all teams were instructed to continue racing. There was no required Speed Bump task in the next leg.
- A purple ε indicates that the team used an Express Pass on that leg to bypass one of their tasks.
- A brown ⊃ indicates that the team used the U-Turn and a brown ⊂ indicates the team on the receiving end of the U-Turn.

Team placement (by leg)
Team	1	2	3	4	5	6	7	8	9	10	11	12
Dana & Matt	1st	4th	4th	3rd	3rd	4th	4th	5th	4th	3rd	2nd	1st
Sheri & Cole	9th	8th	6th	7th	7th	7th (Note: This team arrived last at the Pit Stop, but they were instructed to continue racing.)	5th	6th‡	3rd	4th	3rd	2nd
Tyler & Korey	2nd	1st	2nd	2nd	1st	6th	6th	3rd	1st	1st⊃ (Note: Tyler & Korey chose to use the U-Turn on Brodie & Kurt.)	1st	3rd
Burnie & Ashley	6th	3rd	3rd	4th	6th	2nd	2nd	2nd	2nd	2nd	4th†	
Brodie & Kurt	5th	2nd	1st	1st	2nd	1st	3rd	1stε (Note: Brodie & Kurt used their Express Pass to bypass the Roadblock on this leg.)	5th	5th†⊂		
Zach & Rachel	3rd	6th	9th	5th	5th	3rd	1st	4th	6th†			
Scott & Blair	11th‡	9th	8th	8th	4th	5th	7th†					
Erin & Joslyn	10th	5th	7th	6th	8th†							
Brittany & Jessica	7th	7th	5th	9th†								
Darius & Cameron	4th	10th	10th†									
Marty & Hagan	8th	11th†										

== Race summary ==
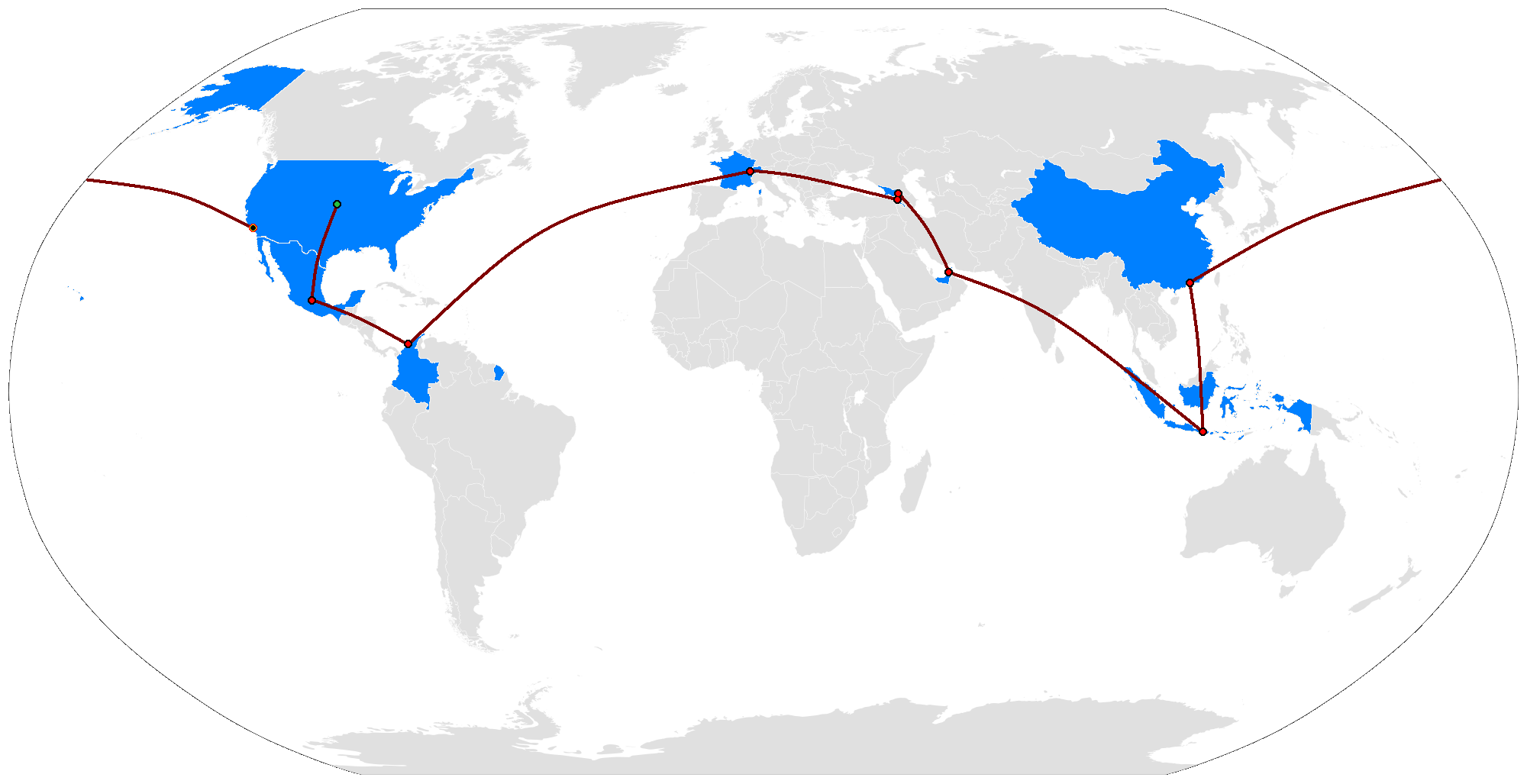
The route of The Amazing Race 28.

Destinations	Air travel Rail travel Water travel Bus travel Helicopter travel Bicycle travel Gondola travel
Route Markers	Detour Roadblock U-Turn Speed Bump Pit Stop

=== Leg 1 (United States → Mexico) ===
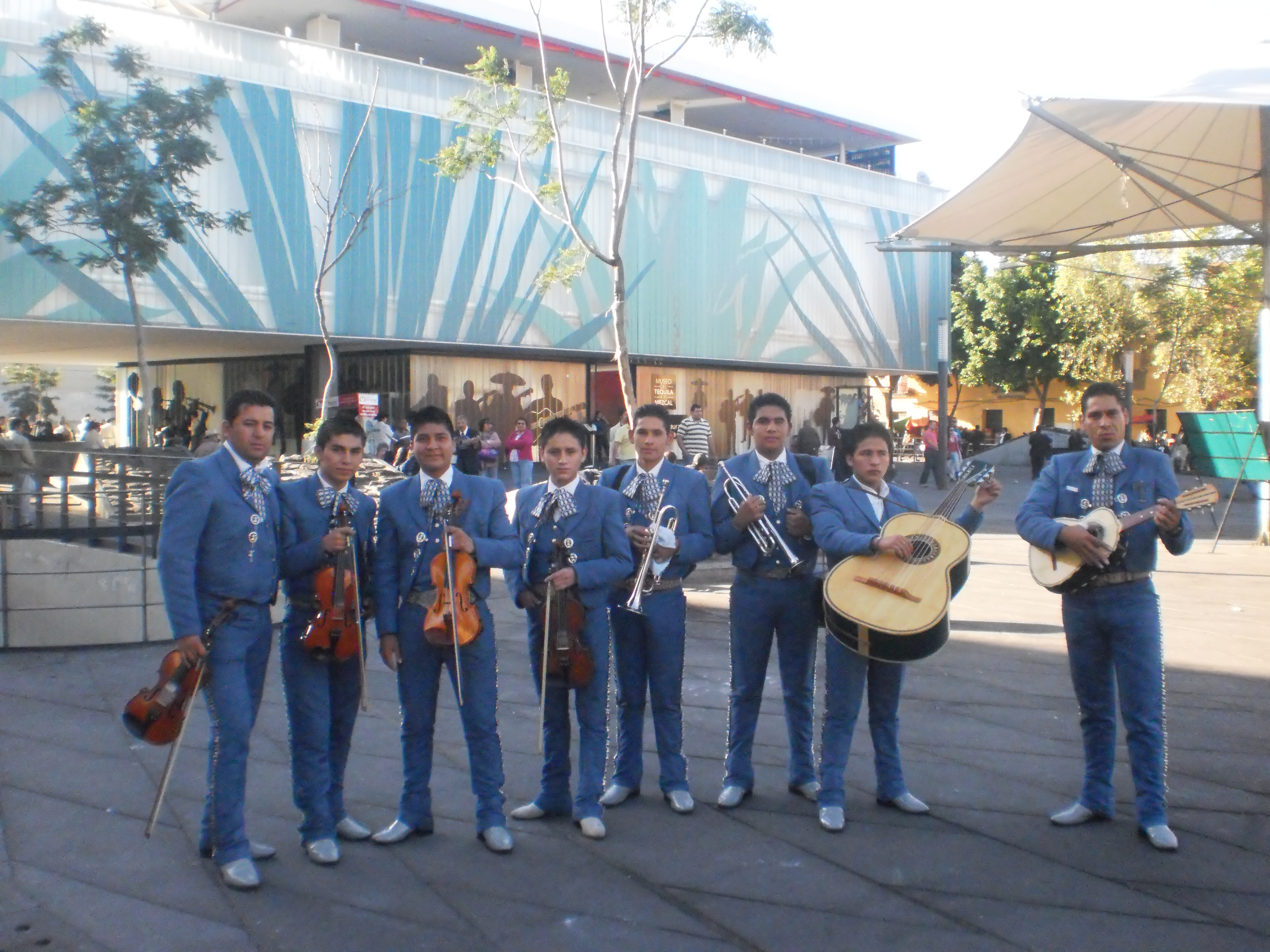
One side of the Detour in Mexico City had teams search through Mariachi performers in Plaza Garibaldi.

- Episode 1: "I Should've Been a Boy Scout" (February 12, 2016)
- Prize: US$2,000 each (awarded to Dana & Matt)

Locations

- Assorted Cities (Teams' Homes) (Start)
- Los Angeles, California or Dallas, Texas or Atlanta, Georgia → Mexico City, Mexico
- Mexico City (Monumento a la Revolución)
- Mexico City (Plaza Garibaldi & Escuela de Mariachi Ollin Yoliztli Garibaldi or Humboldt Parking Garage)
- San Juan Teotihuacán (Parque Temático Tlalocan – Cuevas de Teotihuacan)
- Mexico City (Museo Soumaya)

Episode summary

- Instead of a traditional starting line, teams received a video message from Phil Keoghan at their homes informing them the start of the race. Teams had to travel to their nearest airport and fly to Mexico City, Mexico. Once there, teams had to travel to the Monumento a la Revolución in order to find their first clue.
- This season's first Detour was a choice between Mariachi Madness or Great Bulls of Fire. In Mariachi Madness, teams had to search among 350 Mariachi performers at Plaza Garibaldi for one who was faking their performance of "Cielito Lindo" and then take the performer to a judge in order to receive their next clue. In Great Bulls of Fire, teams had to properly assemble the frame for a torito, a papier-mâché bull, as part of a fireworks display and then light it up in order to receive their next clue.
- After the Detour, teams were instructed to go to the Cuevas de Teotihuacan at the Parque Temático Tlalocan and pick one of three departure times for the next morning.
- In this season's first Roadblock, one team member had to search through the caves for an archeological site and dig up thirteen pieces of a Teotihuacano mask. The site contained pieces for two masks, so team members had to figure out which pieces they needed to find so they could properly assemble one mask and receive their next clue, which directed them to the Pit Stop: the Museo Soumaya in Mexico City.

Additional note

- This was a non-elimination leg.

=== Leg 2 (Mexico → Colombia) ===
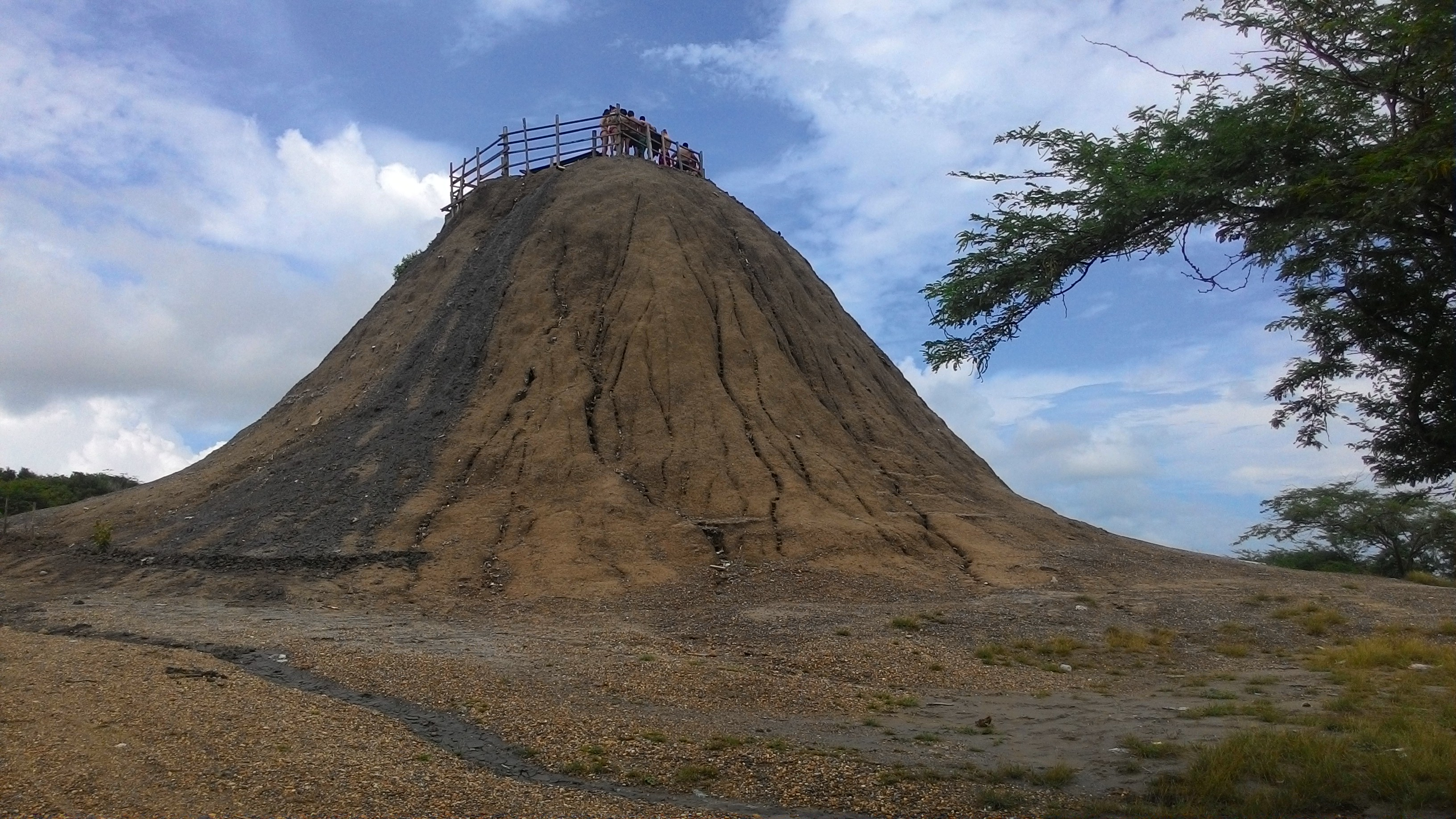
In this leg's Roadblock, one team member had to search for an emerald inside the mud bath atop El Totumo Volcano.

- Episode 2: "You Look Like Gollum" (February 19, 2016)
- Prize: A trip for two to Saint Thomas, U.S. Virgin Islands (awarded to Tyler & Korey)
- Eliminated: Marty & Hagan

Locations

- Mexico City (Museo Soumaya)
- Mexico City → Cartagena, Colombia
- Santa Catalina (El Totumo)
- Manzanillo del Mar (Terraza Melló Farándula Jugos Naturales)
- Manzanillo del Mar (Playa del Ora)
- Cartagena (Plaza Bolívar)

Episode summary

- At the start of this leg, teams were instructed to fly to Cartagena, Colombia. Once there, teams had to travel to El Totumo in Santa Catalina in order to find their next clue.
- In this leg's Roadblock, one team member had to climb into the mud bath atop El Totumo Volcano and find one of several satchels which contained an emerald. They had to wash the emerald before giving it to a judge, who directed them to swim to their next clue in a nearby lagoon.
- After the Roadblock, teams had to go to Manzanillo del Mar and look for a juice stand named Terraza Melló Farándula Jugos Naturales. Once there, they had to find locals playing dominoes, who gave them their next clue.
- For their Speed Bump, Scott & Blair had to help local fishermen haul a large dragnet out of the water and then collect all of the fish captured before they could continue racing.
- This leg's Detour was a choice between Pop-Up or Parrilla. In Pop-Up, teams had to properly assemble a shelter using the provided materials and following a pre-assembled example. Once it was built to the judge's approval, they had to guide a car into the shelter, after which they could receive their next clue. In Parrilla, teams had to properly cook three fish dishes on a parrilla grill. Once their dishes were approved, they had to serve them to nearby locals in order to receive their next clue.
- After the Detour, teams had to check in at the Pit Stop: Plaza Bolívar in Cartagena.

=== Leg 3 (Colombia) ===
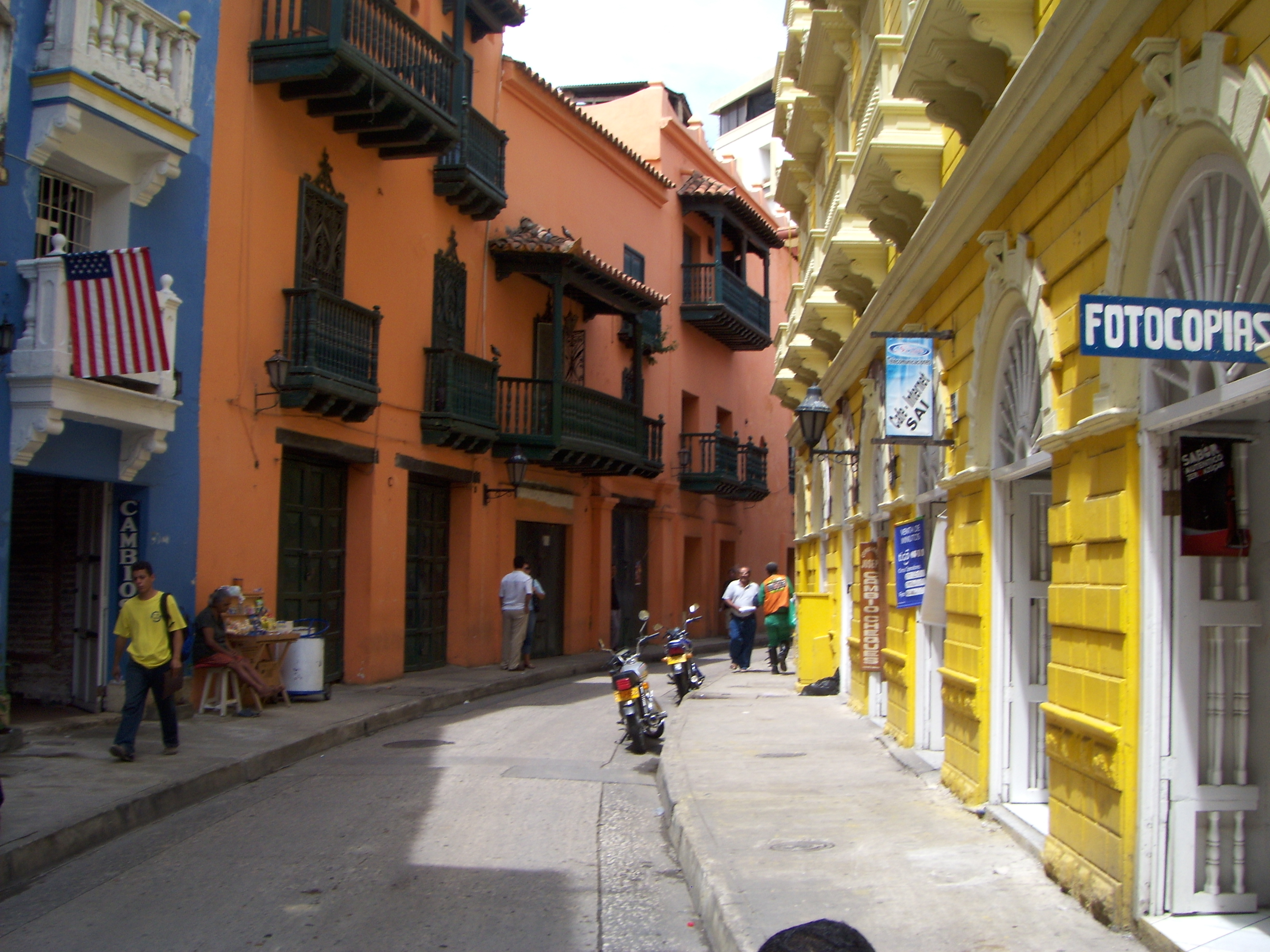
The third leg's Roadblock in Colombia focused on exploring the streets of Cartagena's historical district.

- Episode 3: "Bros Being Jocks" (February 26, 2016)
- Prize: A trip for two to Mykonos, Greece (awarded to Brodie & Kurt)
- Eliminated: Darius & Cameron

Locations

- Cartagena (Plaza Bolívar)
- Cartagena (Plaza San Diego)
- Cartagena (Castillo San Felipe de Barajas)
- Cartagena (Avenida El Lago or Restaurante y Cancha de Tejo Ciracari)
- Cartagena (Calle San Juan de Dios – Museo Naval del Caribe)
- Cartagena (Baluarte de Santiago)

Episode summary

- At the start of this leg, teams had to travel on foot to the Plaza San Diego. There, teams had to search by a group of pollera dancers for their next clue, which directed them to Castillo San Felipe de Barajas. There, teams had to search the catacombs for their next clue.
- This leg's Detour was a choice between Tickets or Tejo. In Tickets, teams had to work as bus conductors on a Cartagena transit bus and attract enough passengers so as to earn at least COL$20,000 (roughly $6.00), which they could trade for their next clue. In Tejo, teams had to play tejo, by hitting three gunpowder-loaded targets with a stone disc, in order to receive their next clue.
- After the Detour, teams had to travel to Calle San Juan de Dios and find a local mochila vendor outside the Museo Naval del Caribe, who had their next clue.
- In this leg's Roadblock, one team member had to pick a mochila, a traditional Colombian knapsack, and search for other vendors between Plaza Santa Teresa and Plaza Santo Domingo to find two bags tagged with the same designer out of hundreds on display, which they could trade for their next clue, which directed them to the Pit Stop: Baluarte de Santiago.

=== Leg 4 (Colombia → Switzerland → France) ===
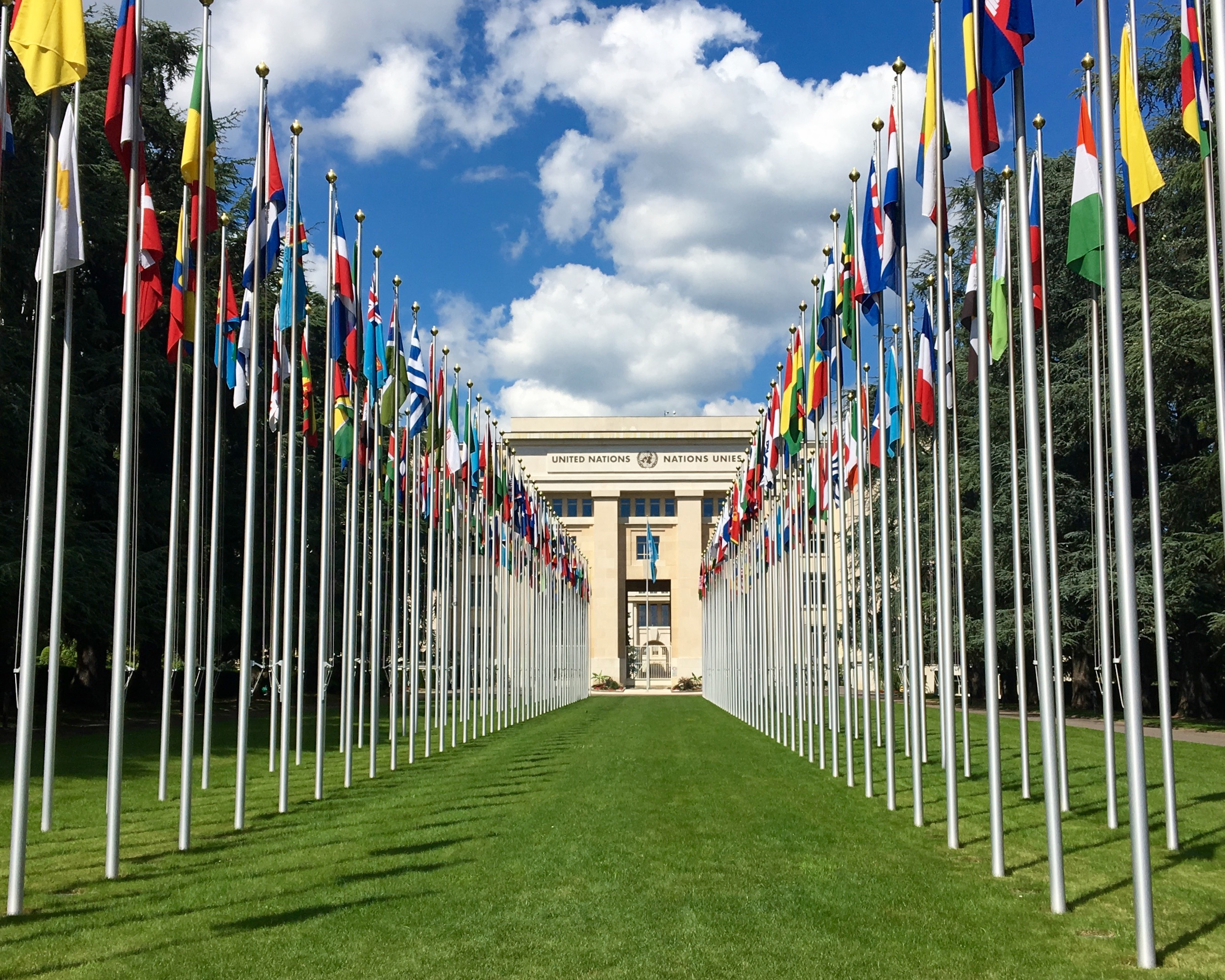
While in Geneva, the Roadblock focused on finding ten flags of the United Nations founding members at the Palace of Nations.

- Episode 4: "Get It Trending" (March 4, 2016)
- Prize: US$3,000 each (awarded to Brodie & Kurt)
- Eliminated: Brittany & Jessica

Locations

- Cartagena (Baluarte de Santiago)
- Cartagena → Geneva, Switzerland
- Geneva (Jet d'Eau)
- Geneva (Chocolats Rohr)
- Geneva (Victorinox Flagship Store or Promenade de la Treille)
- Geneva (Broken Chair)
- Geneva (Palace of Nations)
- Geneva → Chamonix, France
- Chamonix (Place du Triangle de l'Amitié)

Episode summary

- At the start of this leg, teams were instructed to fly to Geneva, Switzerland. Once there, teams had to travel to the Jet d'Eau in order to retrieve their next clue. Teams were instructed to go to Chocolats Rohr and pick a number, which determined the order of their departure the next morning.
- This leg's Detour was a choice between Work Bench or Bench Work. In Work Bench, teams had to correctly assemble a Victorinox Swiss Army knife in order to receive their next clue. In Bench Work, teams had to travel to the Promenade de la Treille, where they had to determine how many people could sit on the world's longest wooden bench. Teammates had to measure it by sitting next to each other, alternating down the entire length of the bench. If their answer was within a correct range, teams received their next clue; but if they were incorrect, they had to measure again.
- After the Detour, teams found their next clue at the Broken Chair statue.
- In this leg's Roadblock, one team member had to identify ten flags from a group of 193, representing ten of the founding members of the United Nations. Teams had to find the ten flags in a book which contained all of the flags, and then present the correct flags to a judge in order to receive their next clue.

Flag	Nation
(Belarus)	Belarus
(Costa Rica)	Costa Rica
(Ethiopia)	Ethiopia
(India)	India
(Liberia)	Liberia
(Netherlands)	Netherlands
(Norway)	Norway
(South Africa)	South Africa
(Turkey)	Turkey
(Uruguay)	Uruguay

- After the Roadblock, teams had to travel by train to Chamonix, France, and search for the Pit Stop at the Place du Triangle de l'Amitié.

=== Leg 5 (France) ===
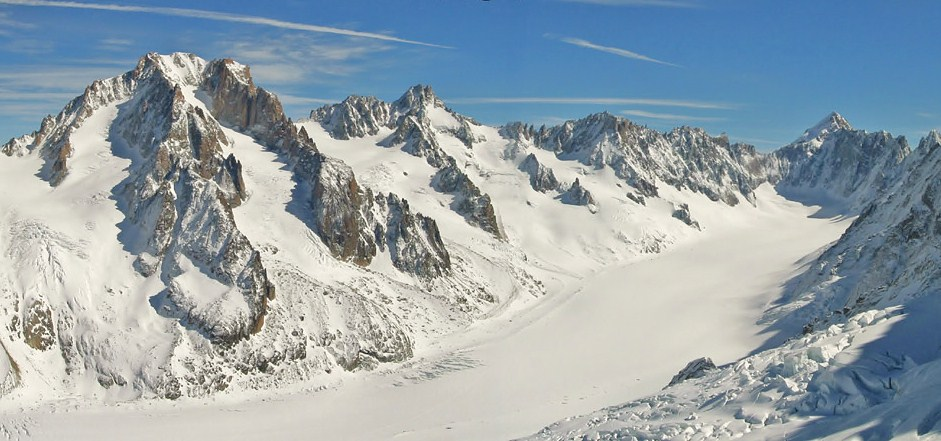
The Mont Blanc massif and the Argentière Glacier served as backdrop for this leg's tasks.

- Episode 5: "We're Only Doing Freaky Stuff Today" (March 11, 2016)
- Prize: A trip for two to Boracay, Philippines (awarded to Tyler & Korey)
- Eliminated: Erin & Joslyn

Locations

- Chamonix (Place du Triangle de l'Amitié)
- Chamonix (Streets of Chamonix)
- Chamonix (Les Grands Montets Gondola Station & Mont Blanc Massif – Les Grands Montets Summit)
- Chamonix (Planpraz Gondola Station)
- Chamonix (Aiguilles Rouges – Planpraz)
- Chamonix (Place Balmat – Michel-Gabriel Paccard Statue)

Episode summary

- At the start of this leg, teams had to search the nearby streets to find a vehicle with a specific license plate. After finding their car, teams directed their driver to drive to the Les Grands Montets gondola station, where teams had to ascend to the summit of Les Grands Montets, and once atop the mountain, one team member had to traverse a suspension line and retrieve their next clue from the other side.
- This leg's Detour was a choice between Dynamite or Campsite. In Dynamite, teams had to collect two dynamite sticks commonly used for avalanche prevention. They then had to traverse down a mountain via ferrata and deliver their dynamite to the mountaineer, who gave them their next clue. In Campsite, teams had to pitch a tent so as to match an example and build a protective snow wall beside the tent in order to receive their next clue.
- After the Detour, teams had to travel to the Planpraz Gondola Station in order to find their next clue.
- In this leg's Roadblock, one team member had to travel via gondola to Planpraz. They then had to perform a tandem paragliding ride 7,000 feet (2,100 m) from the side of the Aiguilles Rouges. Once in the air, they had to spot a yeti waving a French flag. After landing, racers were asked which country's flag they saw, and if they answered correctly, they received their next clue, which directed them to the Pit Stop: the statue of Michel-Gabriel Paccard.

=== Leg 6 (France → Armenia) ===
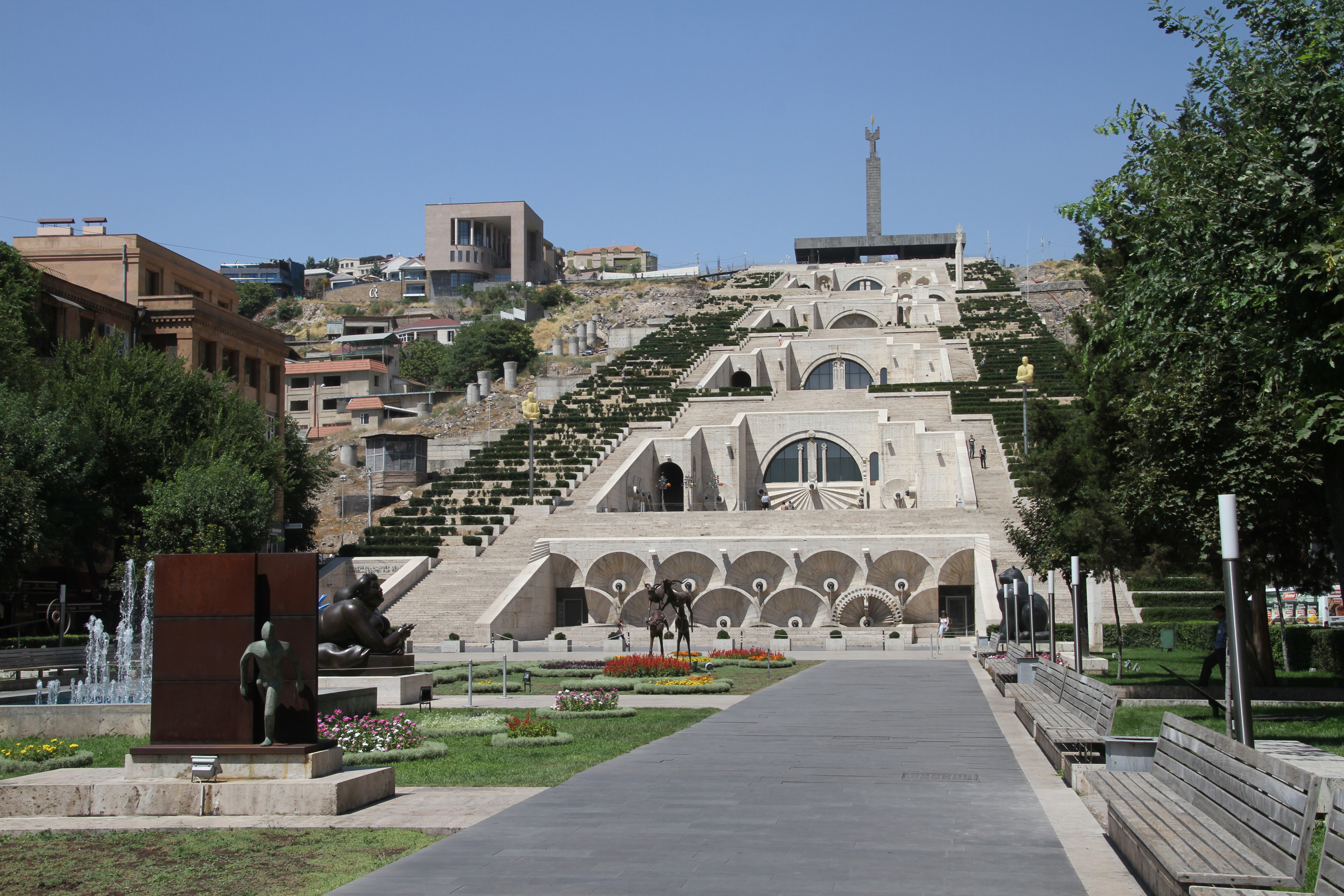
While at Armenia, teams visited the Yerevan Cascade.

- Episode 6: "Let the Good Times Roll" (April 1, 2016)
- Prize: One Express Pass (awarded to Brodie & Kurt)

Locations

- Chamonix (Place Balmat – Michel-Gabriel Paccard Statue)
- Geneva, Switzerland → Yerevan, Armenia
- Yerevan (Yerevan Opera Theater)
- Yerevan (Yerevan Cascade)
- Yerevan (Megerian Carpet Factory or Parvana Restaurant)
- Yerevan (Republic Square) → Hatsavan (Roadside)
- Garni (Temple of Garni)

Episode summary

- At the start of this leg, teams were instructed to fly to Yerevan, Armenia. Once there, teams had to travel to the Yerevan Opera Theater, where they had to search for their next clue inside the theater while being treated to a performance of Aram Khachaturian's "Sabre Dance". Teams were then directed to travel on foot to the Yerevan Cascade, where they had to climb 500 steps in order to retrieve their next clue.
- This leg's Detour was a choice between Thread or Bread. In Thread, teams traveled to the Megerian Carpet Factory, where they had to complete a row of 200 stitches on an Armenian carpet while following a pattern in order to receive their next clue. In Bread, teams traveled to the Parvana Restaurant, where they had to roll out dough and bake fifteen traditional pieces of bread called lavash using a tonir, an Armenian underground oven, in order to receive their next clue.
- After the Detour, teams had to travel to Republic Square and choose a bus that took them to Hatsavan, overlooking Mount Ararat, where they found their next clue.
- In this leg's Roadblock, one team member had to choose a Lada VAZ-2101 taxi from the roadside along with a driver. They then had to direct the taxi onto a ramp and properly perform an oil change in order to receive their next clue, which directed them to the Pit Stop: the Temple of Garni.

Additional notes

- There was no elimination at the end of this leg; all teams were instead instructed to continue racing.
- Armenian musician Gevorg Dabaghyan appeared as the Pit Stop greeter in this leg.

=== Leg 7 (Armenia → Georgia) ===
Teams finished this leg at the Rike Park overlooking the famous Peace Bridge of Tbilisi along the banks of the Mtkvari River.

- Episode 7: "Welcome to Bloody Fingers 101" (April 8, 2016)
- Prize: A trip for two to Turks and Caicos (awarded to Zach & Rachel)
- Eliminated: Scott & Blair

Locations

- Yerevan → Tbilisi, Georgia
- Tbilisi (Freedom Square – St. George Statue)
- Tbilisi (Narikala Fortress → Rike Park)
- Mtskheta (Jvari Monastery)
- Chardakhi (Iago's Wine) or Mtskheta (Arsekidzis 15)
- Tbilisi (Rustaveli National Theater)
- Tbilisi (Rike Park)

Episode summary

- At the start of this leg, teams were instructed to travel by overnight train to Tbilisi, Georgia. Once there, they had to travel to Freedom Square and find their next clue near the St. George Statue. Teams then traveled to the Narikala Fortress, where they had to ride a gondola down to the banks of the Mtkvari River. They then had to go to the Jvari Monastery, where they found their next clue.
- This leg's Detour was a choice between Clean or String. In Clean, teams had to travel to Iago's Wine and wash out a traditional kvevri clay pot buried in the ground to the satisfaction of the winery owner to receive their next clue. In String, teams had to travel to Arsekidzis 15 and thread five strings of twenty hazelnuts to make traditional churchkhela (a sausage-shaped candy). Teams then had to dip them into a pot to glaze them and hang them up to dry before receiving their next clue.
- After the Detour, teams had to travel to the Rustaveli National Theater in Tbilisi to find their next clue.
- In this leg's Roadblock, one team member had to join the Georgian National Ballet and perform a fast-paced routine on stage to the satisfaction of the choreographer to receive their next clue, which directed them to the Pit Stop: Rike Park, overlooking the Bridge of Peace.

=== Leg 8 (Georgia → United Arab Emirates) ===
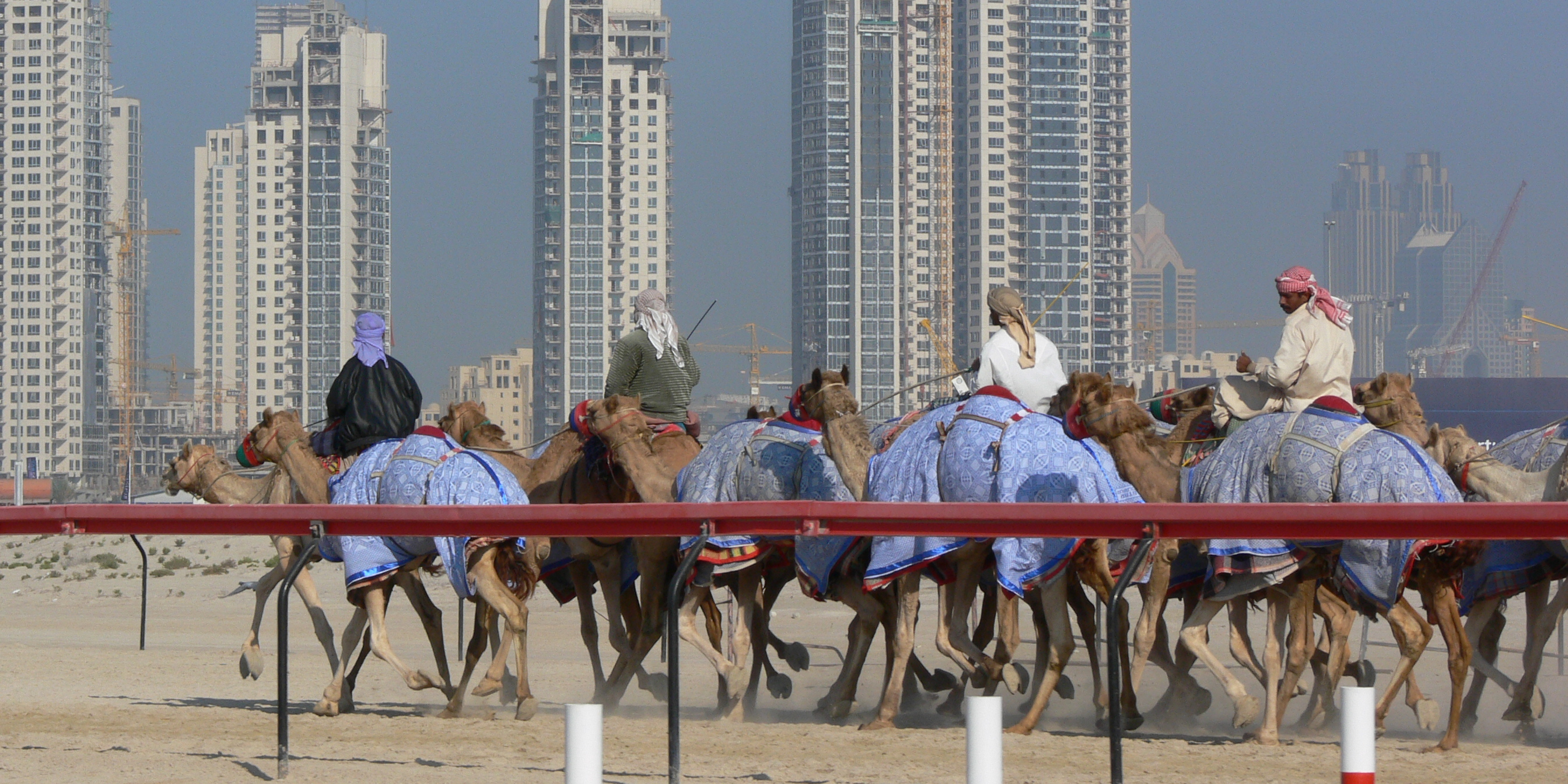
The Detour in Dubai had teams compete against racing camels.

- Episode 8: "I Have a Wedgie and a Half" (April 15, 2016)
- Prize: A trip for two to Helsinki, Finland (awarded to Brodie & Kurt)

Locations

- Tbilisi (Rike Park)
- Tbilisi → Dubai, United Arab Emirates
- Margham (Dubai Desert Conservation Reserve – Bedouin Camp)
- Al Lisaili (Dubai Camel Race Track) or Murqquab (Al Maha Desert)
- Palm Jumeirah (Atlantis, The Palm – Aquaventure)
- Palm Jumeirah (Atlantis, The Palm – Poseidon's Revenge)
- Dubai (Deira Old Souq Station)

Episode summary

- At the start of this leg, teams were instructed to fly to Dubai in the United Arab Emirates. Once there, teams had to drive themselves to a Bedouin camp in the Margham desert, where teams were given their next clue along with a Travelocity Roaming Gnome.
- This leg's Detour was a choice between Races or Oasis. In Races, teams traveled to the Dubai Camel Race Track. There, they used bicycles to compete against racing camels, who could reach speeds up to 40 mph (64 km/h), on a 1.2-mile (1.9 km) course. If teams finished ahead of the camels, they could receive their next clue. In Oasis, teams had to lead four camels across a marked path through the desert to a Bedouin camp, where they were offered traditional regag bread and camel milk along with their next clue.
- After the Detour, teams had to drive to Atlantis, The Palm, and search Aquaventure for their next clue. This was the same water park that teams visited in season 15.
- In this leg's Roadblock, one team member had to put on a diving helmet and walk through an aquarium containing sharks, rays, and other sea creatures in order to retrieve a canister containing a puzzle. Once they were out of the aquarium, they had to solve the puzzle in order to receive their next clue. Brodie & Kurt used their Express Pass to bypass this Roadblock.
- After the Roadblock, teams had to slide down the Poseidon's Revenge water slide in order to receive their next clue. Teams then had to drive back to Dubai and travel by abra to the Pit Stop: the Deira Old Souq Station.

Additional note

- This was a non-elimination leg.

=== Leg 9 (United Arab Emirates → Indonesia) ===
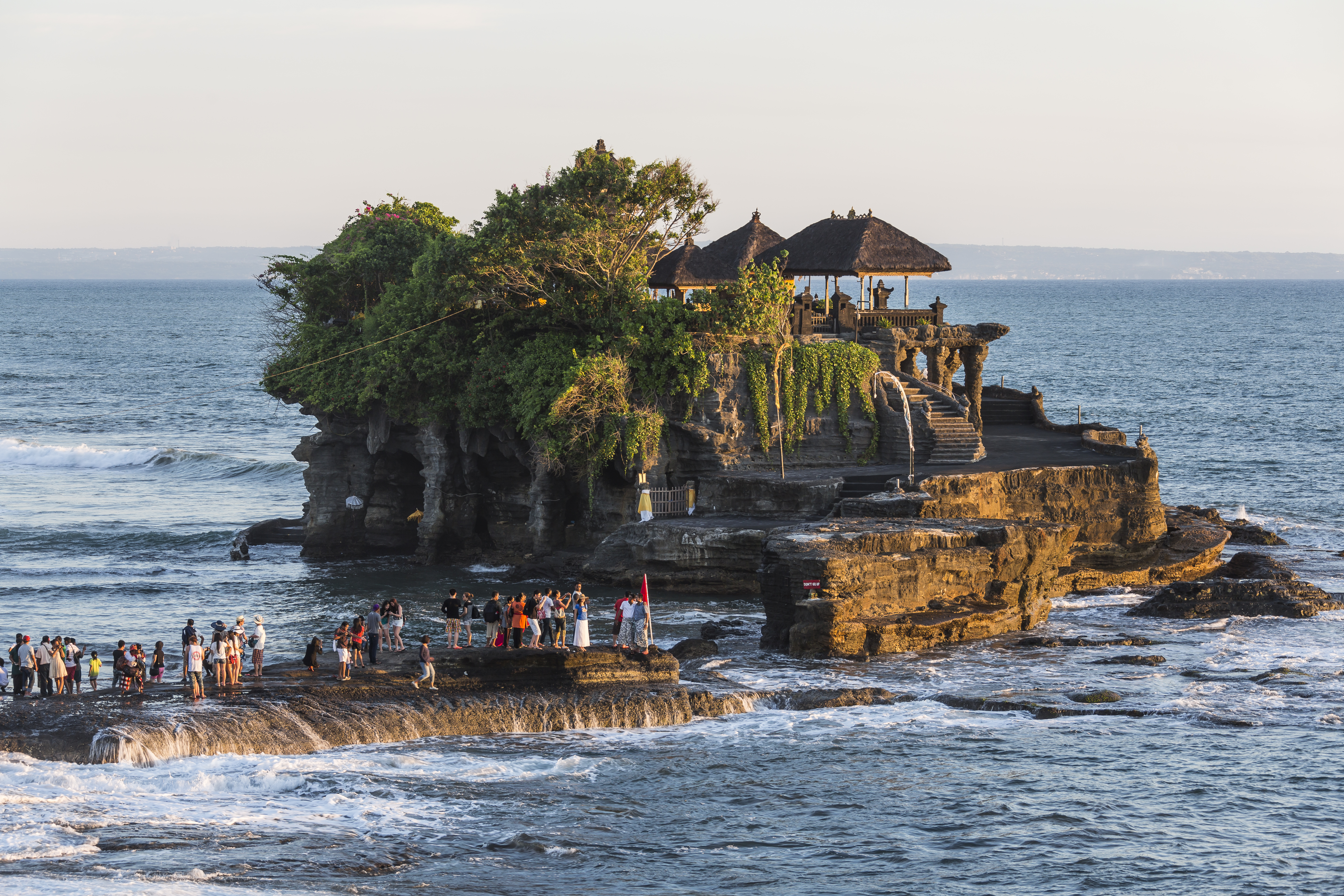
After arriving in Indonesia, teams visited Tanah Lot, a Balinese temple, to deliver religious offerings and pythons.

- Episode 9: "Salt That Sand!" (April 22, 2016)
- Prize: US$5,000 each (awarded to Tyler & Korey)
- Eliminated: Zach & Rachel

Locations

- Dubai (Deira Old Souq Station)
- Dubai → Denpasar, Indonesia
- Beraban (Tanah Lot – Enjung Galuh Temple & Snake Temple)
- Kusamba (Banjar Belatung Kusamba Beach)
- Pesinggahan (Bat Temple)
- Denpasar (Mertasari Beach)
- Denpasar (Semawang Beach – Pinisi)

Episode summary

- At the start of this leg, teams were instructed to fly to Denpasar, Indonesia, on the island of Bali. Once there, teams had to travel to Tanah Lot and pick one of three departure times the next morning, when each team member had to deliver a religious offering known as a gebogan on their heads to the Enjung Galuh Temple. Once there, they had to trade their gebogans for two live pythons, which they had to carry around their necks and deliver to the Snake Temple in order to receive their next clue directing them to Banjar Belatung Kusamba Beach.
- In this leg's first Roadblock, one team member had to collect seawater in two baskets on a bamboo pole and shake out the water onto a bed of volcanic sand so that it could evaporate. After filling the plot of sand, they then had to scrape enough crystallized salt from the brine troughs to fill a basket. Finally, they had to properly fill four plastic bags with salt in order to receive their next clue.
- For their Speed Bump, Sheri & Cole had to go to the Bat Temple and prepare and sell ten bowls of a traditional Indonesian meatball dish known as bakso for Rp10,000 each. Each team member then had to finish a bowl of bakso before they could continue racing and perform the leg's first Roadblock.
- After the first Roadblock, teams had to travel to Mertasari Beach in order to find their next clue.
- In this leg's second Roadblock, the team member who did not perform the previous Roadblock had to properly assemble a 30-foot (9.1 m) traditional kite and fly it along the beach with a team of kite enthusiasts in order to receive their next clue.
- After the second Roadblock, teams had to travel to Semawang Beach and then paddle an outrigger canoe to a traditional pinisi sailing ship, which was the Pit Stop.

=== Leg 10 (Indonesia) ===
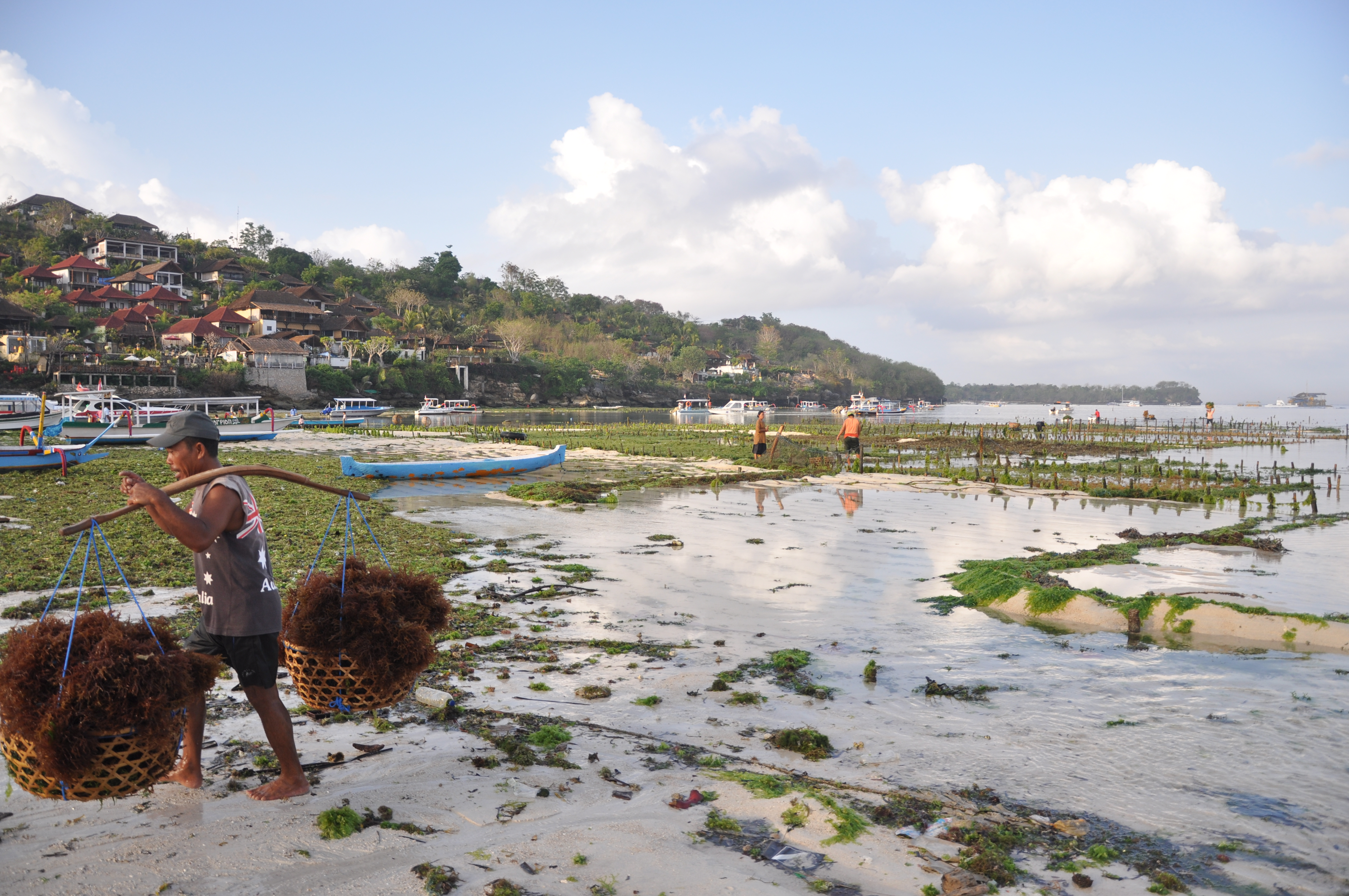
One of the Detour tasks in Nusa Lembongan required teams to harvest seaweed.

- Episode 10: "Monkey Dance!" (April 29, 2016)
- Prize: A trip for two on an Alaskan cruise (awarded to Tyler & Korey)
- Eliminated: Brodie & Kurt

Locations

- Denpasar (Semawang Beach – Pinisi)
- Nusa Penida (Gamat Bay)
- Nusa Lembongan (Hai Tide Beach Resort – Mushroom Beach)
- Nusa Lembongan (Pura Puseh)
- Nusa Lembongan (Lembongan–Ceningan Bridge or Seaweed Farm)
- Nusa Lembongan (Warung Sunrise)
- Nusa Lembongan (Hai Tide Beach Resort – Pande Curly Paddleboard Shop)
- Nusa Ceningan (Blue Lagoon)
- Denpasar (Bajra Sandhi Monument)

Episode summary

- At the start of this leg, teams took a boat to Gamat Bay on the island of Nusa Penida. There, they had to search for their clue inside one of three clue boxes near the corals on the ocean floor. After retrieving their clue, teams took a high-speed boat to Mushroom Beach at Hai Tide Beach Resort, and then traveled to Pura Puseh. Before entering the stairway, teams had to wear sarongs on their waist and follow a dancer dressed as a monkey, who then gave them their next clue.
- This leg's Detour was a choice between Haul or Harvest. In Haul, teams had to carry a total of fifty coconuts and four live chickens across a congested suspension bridge and load the coconuts into a delivery truck and the chickens into baskets in order to receive their next clue. In Harvest, teams had to propel a canoe through a marked course, where they had to collect enough seaweed to completely cover a tarp on the beach, in order to receive their next clue.
- After the Detour, teams had to travel to the Warung Sunrise in order to find their next clue, which directed them to the Pande Curly Paddleboard Shop.
- In this leg's Roadblock, one team member had to ride a jet ski to the Blue Lagoon, where they climbed a ladder to the top of a four-story high cliff. They then participated in a Pilates session with Bondi Rescue lifeguard Anthony "Harries" Carroll before jumping 40 feet (12 m) into the sea in order to get their next clue.
- After the Roadblock, teams took a boat back to Bali and then traveled by taxi to the Pit Stop: the Bajra Sandhi Monument in Denpasar.

Additional note

- This leg featured a Double U-Turn. Tyler & Korey chose to use the U-Turn on Brodie & Kurt, while Burnie & Ashley chose to use the U-Turn on Tyler & Korey. However, Tyler & Korey had already passed the U-Turn by this point and were therefore unaffected. Burnie & Ashley knew this, but chose to use the U-Turn so as to prevent other teams from being able to use it.

=== Leg 11 (Indonesia → China) ===
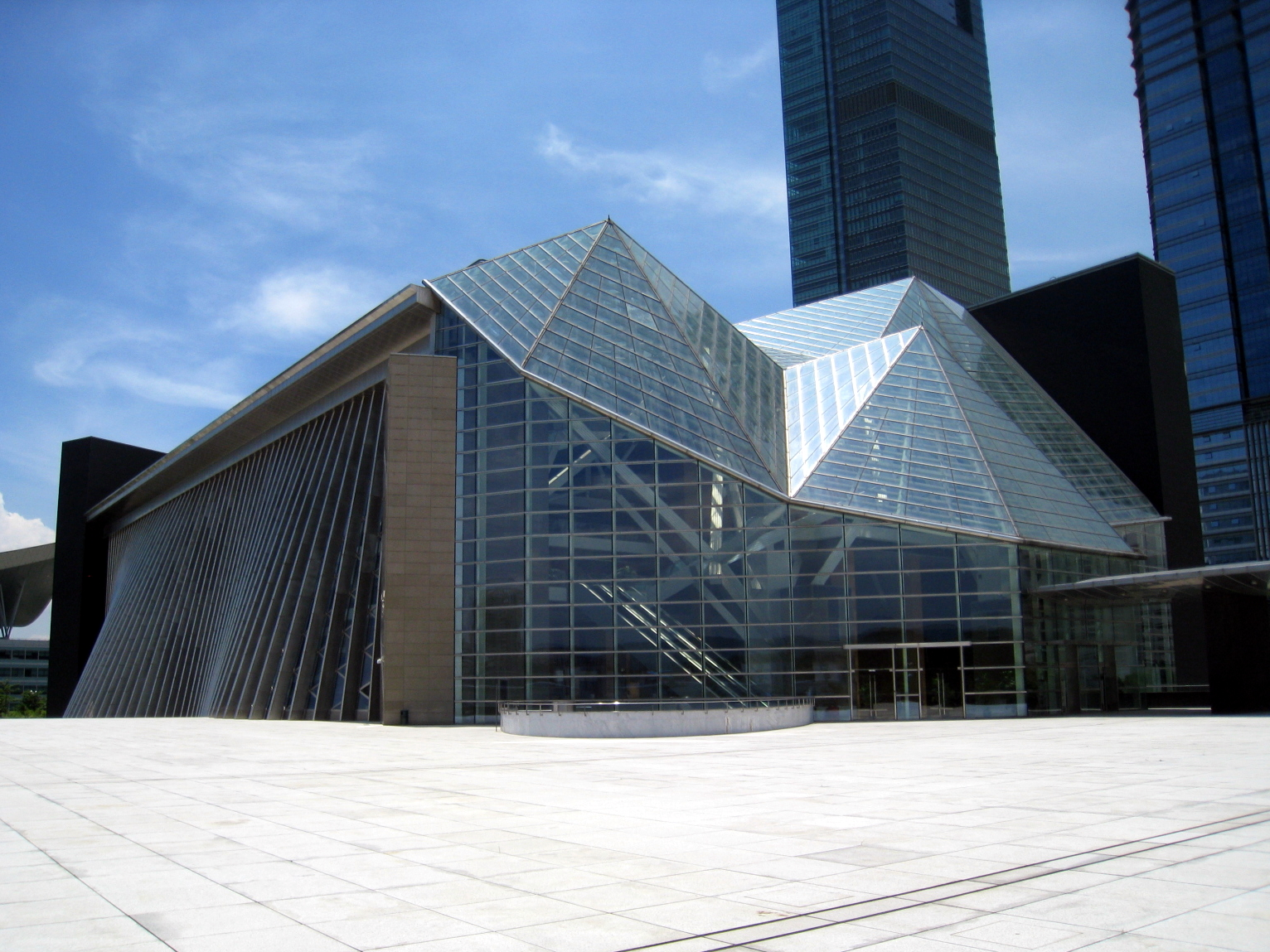
The Shenzhen Library Terrace, which overlooks the Civic Center in Shenzhen, China, served as the Pit Stop for this penultimate leg.

- Episode 11: "That's Money, Honey" (May 6, 2016)
- Eliminated: Burnie & Ashley

Locations

- Denpasar (Pura Dalem Semawa)
- Denpasar → Shenzhen, China
- Shenzhen (Shenzhen Bao'an International Airport – Departure Hall)
- Shenzhen (Shenzhen International Airport → Hourui Station)
- Shenzhen (Hourui Station → Window of the World)
- Shenzhen (Window of the World – Eiffel Tower)
- Shenzhen (Window of the World → Grand Theater Station)
- Shenzhen (Lychee Park – Moon Bridge)
- Shenzhen (Dafen Oil Painting Village)
- Shenzhen (Shenzhen Library Terrace)

Episode summary

- At the start of this leg, teams were instructed to fly to Shenzhen, China. After arriving at Shenzhen Bao'an International Airport, teams had to search the departure hall in order to find their next clue, which directed them to travel by bus and train to the Eiffel Tower, which teams had to figure out that was a replica at the Window of the World.
- In this leg's Roadblock, one team member had to search the grounds of the Window of the World, a park containing replicas of world landmarks, for six specific landmarks that were the answers to riddles given in the clue. At each monument, they had to retrieve a photo sticker and paste it on their provided passport. Once they had all six stickers, they had to show the passport to a park official in order to receive their next clue.
- After the Roadblock, teams had to travel by subway to Lychee Park and search for the Moon Bridge in order to find their next clue.
- This season's final Detour was a choice between Commuter Cycle or Master of Arts. In Commuter Cycle, teams had to ride self-balancing unicycles down a busy street while holding a briefcase and a coffee cup in order to receive the combination to the briefcase, which contained their next clue. In Master of Arts, teams had to search for a plaza filled with painters at the Dafen Oil Painting Village for one who held a marked paintbrush. The painter led them to a shop where they found disassembled pieces of art. After bringing the pieces of art to another shop, they then had to properly install the artwork on a wall in order to receive their next clue.
- After the Detour, teams received a photo of a building, which they had to figure out was the Shenzhen Civic Center. From there, they had to search the grounds for the Pit Stop: the terrace of the Shenzhen Library.

=== Leg 12 (China → United States) ===
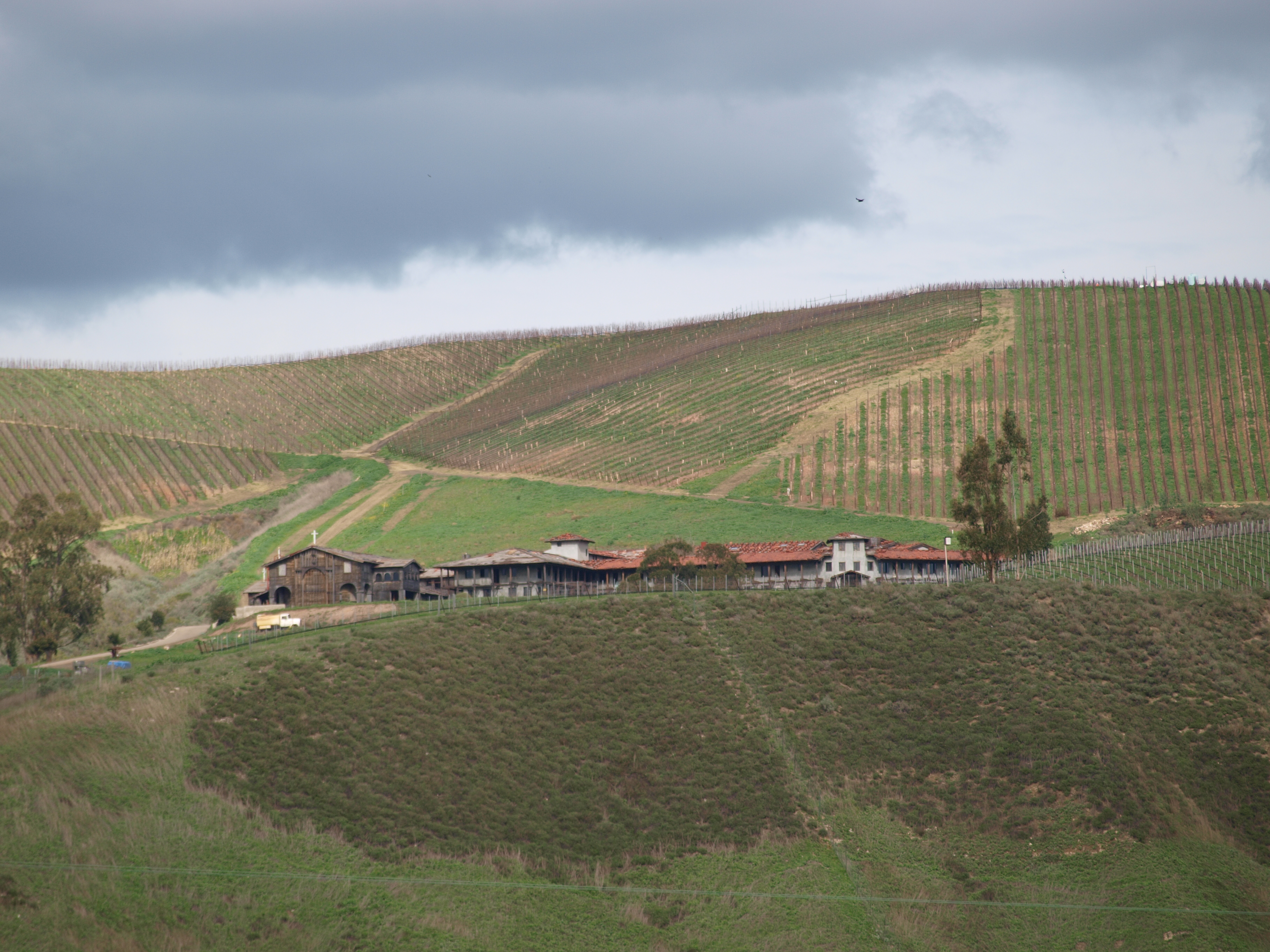
The final Roadblock paid tribute to California's wine industry in Santa Barbara.

- Episode 12: "The Only First That Matters" (May 13, 2016)
- Prize: US$1,000,000
- Winners: Dana & Matt
- Runners-up: Sheri & Cole
- Third place: Tyler & Korey

Locations

- Shenzhen (Shenzhen Library Terrace)
- Guangzhou → Los Angeles, California
- Los Angeles (Angelus Plaza)
- Los Angeles (Angelus Plaza) → Santa Barbara
- Santa Barbara (Santa Barbara Harbor – Theresa Ann)
- Santa Barbara (Rattlesnake Canyon – Gibraltar Rock)
- Santa Ynez (Grassini Family Vineyards)

Episode summary

- At the end of the previous leg, Phil informed teams that they were flying to Los Angeles, California. Once there, teams had to find their next clue at Angelus Plaza.
- In this leg's first Roadblock, one team member had to jump from the roof of the Angelus Plaza and grab their next clue, which was hanging in mid-air 170 feet (52 m) above the ground. If they failed, racers had to rappel back down and try again, but with each failed attempt, the clue was moved closer to them.
- After the first Roadblock, teams traveled by helicopter to Santa Barbara. Once there, teams had to travel to Santa Barbara Harbor and use a marked dinghy in order to find the Theresa Ann, where a fisherman on board gave them their next clue sending them to Gibraltar Rock. Once there, teams were instructed to take part in synchronized mountaineering. One team member traversed horizontally across a suspended line to grab one half of the clue, which caused their partner to simultaneously descend down the face of the cliff to pick up the other half. Once they were reunited, team members had to join the two halves together in order to read their next clue, which directed them to Grassini Family Vineyards in Santa Ynez.
- In this season's final Roadblock, the team member who did not perform the previous Roadblock had to arrange wine barrel lids, which featured hashtags that had been printed on teams' clues in previous legs, and then spell the name of each corresponding city in chronological order. Once the hashtags and the cities were correct, teams could receive their final clue, which instructed them to search the grounds of Grassini Family Vineyards for the finish line.

Hashtag	City
#MuseoSoumaya	Mexico City
#WalledCity	Cartagena
#JetStream	Geneva
#MontBlanc	Chamonix
#12thCapital	Yerevan
#PeaceBridge	Tbilisi
#WaterSlide	Dubai
#GatewayToBali	Denpasar
#ParametricDesign	Shenzhen

== Production ==
=== Development and filming ===
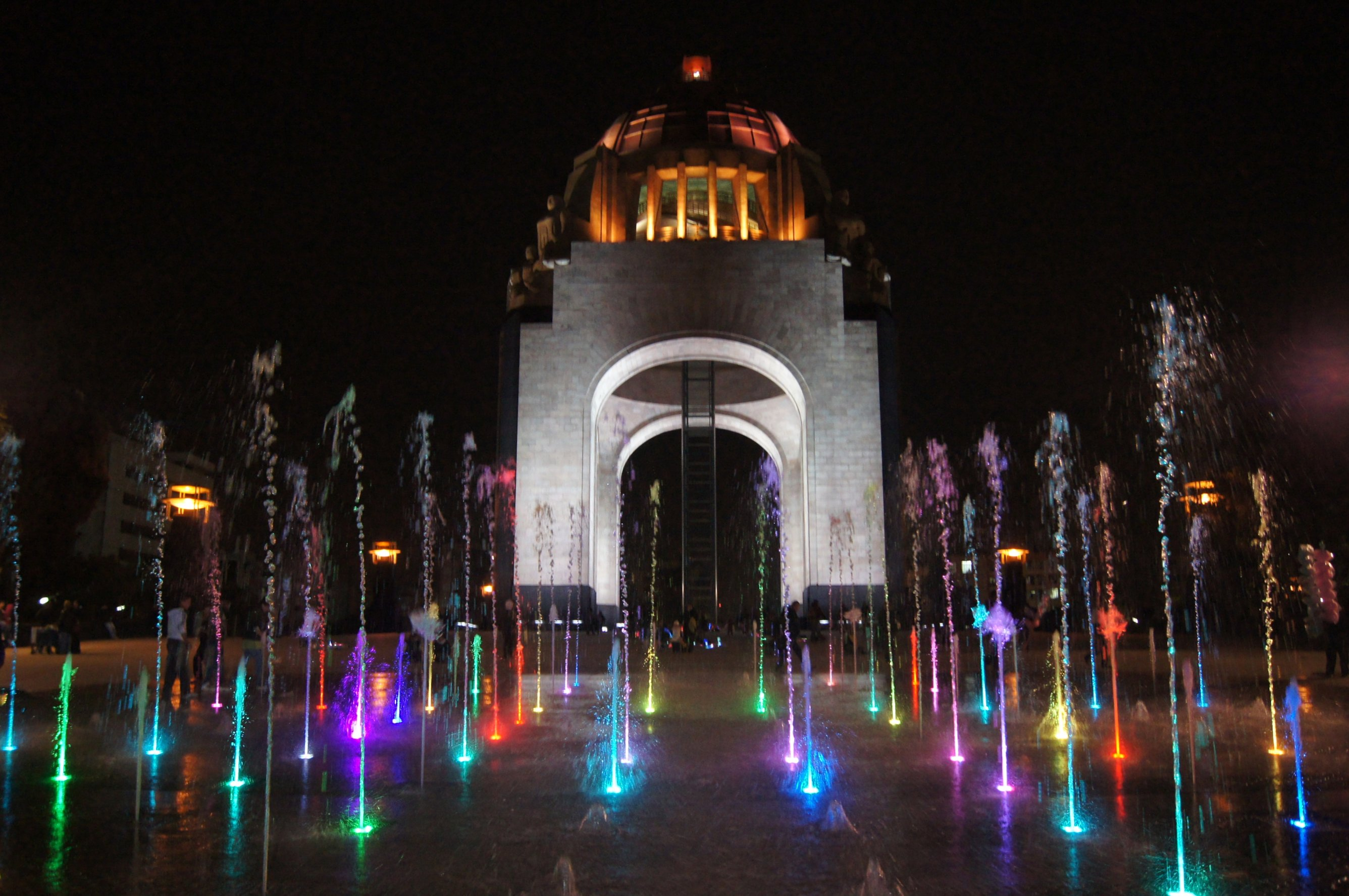
The 28th season of The Amazing Race started filming on November 15, 2015, where Phil greeted teams at their first destination, the Monumento a la Revolución in Mexico City.

Filming of The Amazing Race 28 began on November 15, 2015, with host Phil Keoghan broadcasting each team's arrival at the first clue location, the Monumento a la Revolución in Mexico City, via social media. Unlike previous seasons, the season began in the teams' hometowns rather than at a traditional starting line.

In total, this season spanned 18 cities and 10 countries over 27,000 miles (43,000 km) and included first-time visits to Armenia, Colombia, and Georgia. Racers were reported near Cartagena, Colombia on November 19, 2015. Filming of the show was also reported within and near Tbilisi, Georgia at the Narikala fortress, Rustaveli Theatre, the Bridge of Peace, and the Jvari Monastery in Mtskheta on November 27, 2015. Filming ended on December 6, 2015, after 21 days.

Phil Keoghan stated that the use of social media stars was considered a "social experiment" attempting to bridge the gap between long-time fans of the show and younger viewers who may not have been born when the show debuted in 2001. Keoghan stated that bringing in contestants whom younger viewers may be more familiar with, particularly when promoted over social media, generated interest in earlier seasons of the show. Executive producer Bertram van Munster stated that the use of social media stars was also something suggested by CBS, due to the fact that CBS wanted to see the show to gain more involvement with social media.

== Reception ==
=== Critical response ===
While the casting twist for this season was criticized by long-term fans before the premiere, reviews for The Amazing Race 28 were more mixed. Daniel Fienberg of The Hollywood Reporter wrote that this season was one of multiple recent seasons that "sullied" The Amazing Race. Ken Tucker of Yahoo! called this season "dreadful". Luke Gelineau of TV Equals called this season "an agonizing series of frustrating legs filled with stupid decisions and vapid contestants". Phil Naegely of FanSided wrote that this season "was filled with many memorable moments" and "had drama in each and every leg". Jenni Powell of Tubefilter wrote that this season "was for the most part a very fun ride" and "a very good season". In 2024, Rhenn Taguiam of Game Rant placed this season within the bottom 13 out of 36.

=== Ratings ===
U.S. Nielsen ratings

No.	Title	Air date	Rating/share (18–49)	Viewers (millions)	DVR (18–49)	DVR viewers (millions)	Total (18–49)	Total viewers (millions)	Ref
1	"I Should've Been a Boy Scout"	February 12, 2016	1.3/5	6.09	—N/a	—N/a	—N/a	—N/a	
2	"You Look Like Gollum"	February 19, 2016	1.1/4	5.82	—N/a	—N/a	—N/a	—N/a	
3	"Bros Being Jocks"	February 26, 2016	1.1/4	5.69	0.7	—N/a	1.8	—N/a	
4	"Get It Trending"	March 4, 2016	1.1/4	5.79	—N/a	—N/a	—N/a	—N/a	
5	"We're Only Doing Freaky Stuff Today"	March 11, 2016	1.0/4	5.45	0.6	—N/a	1.6	—N/a	
6	"Let The Good Times Roll"	April 1, 2016	1.1/5	5.83	—N/a	—N/a	—N/a	—N/a	
7	"Welcome To Bloody Fingers 101"	April 8, 2016	1.1/5	5.51	—N/a	—N/a	—N/a	—N/a	
8	"I Have a Wedgie and a Half"	April 15, 2016	1.0/4	5.47	—N/a	—N/a	—N/a	—N/a	
9	"Salt That Sand!"	April 22, 2016	1.0/4	5.43	—N/a	—N/a	—N/a	—N/a	
10	"Monkey Dance!"	April 29, 2016	0.9/4	5.44	0.6	—N/a	1.5	—N/a	
11	"That's Money, Honey"	May 6, 2016	0.9/4	5.19	0.6	—N/a	1.5	—N/a	
12	"The Only First That Matters"	May 13, 2016	1.1/4	5.93	—N/a	—N/a	—N/a	—N/a	

Canadian ratings

Canadian broadcaster CTV also aired The Amazing Race on Fridays. Episodes aired at 8:00 p.m. Eastern and Central (9:00 p.m. Pacific, Mountain and Atlantic).

Canadian DVR ratings are included in Numeris's count.

No.	Air date	Episode	Viewers (millions)	Rank (Week)	Ref
1	February 12, 2016	"I Should've Been a Boy Scout"	1.62	13	
2	February 19, 2016	"You Look Like Gollum"	1.61	13	
3	February 26, 2016	"Bros Being Jocks"	1.45	18	
4	March 4, 2016	"Get It Trending"	1.56	13	
5	March 11, 2016	"We're Only Doing Freaky Stuff Today"	1.44	11	
6	April 1, 2016	"Let The Good Times Roll"	1.48	15	
7	April 8, 2016	"Welcome To Bloody Fingers 101"	1.33	19	
8	April 15, 2016	"I Have a Wedgie and a Half"	1.64	9	
9	April 22, 2016	"Salt That Sand!"	1.45	17	
10	April 29, 2016	"Monkey Dance!"	1.39	17	
11	May 6, 2016	"That's Money, Honey"	1.45	15	
12	May 13, 2016	"The Only First That Matters"	1.60	9	

== Works cited ==
- Castro, Adam-Troy (2006). My Ox Is Broken!. BenBella Books. ISBN 978-1-932100-91-4.
