= Hatsavan =

Hatsavan or Hats’avan or Atsavan may refer to:

- Hatsavan, Kotayk, Armenia
- Hatsavan, Syunik, Armenia
