= Petite Aiguille Verte =

- Location within France

Highest point
- Elevation: 3,512 m (11,522 ft)
- Coordinates: 45°56′52″N 06°57′31″E

Geography
- Location: Haute-Savoie, Rhône-Alpes, France
- Parent range: Mont Blanc Massif

The Petite Aiguille Verte (3,512m) is a mountain in the Mont Blanc Massif of the French Alps.

It is located between the Mer de Glace and Argentiere Glacier, and can be climbed from the Grands Montets cable car.
