= Brodie Smith =

Brodie Smith may refer to:

- Brodie Smith (footballer) (born 1992), Australian rules footballer
- Brodie Smith (goalball player) (born 1998), Australian athlete
- Brodie Smith (ultimate) (born 1987), American athlete
