= Matt Steffanina =

American choreographer (born 1986)

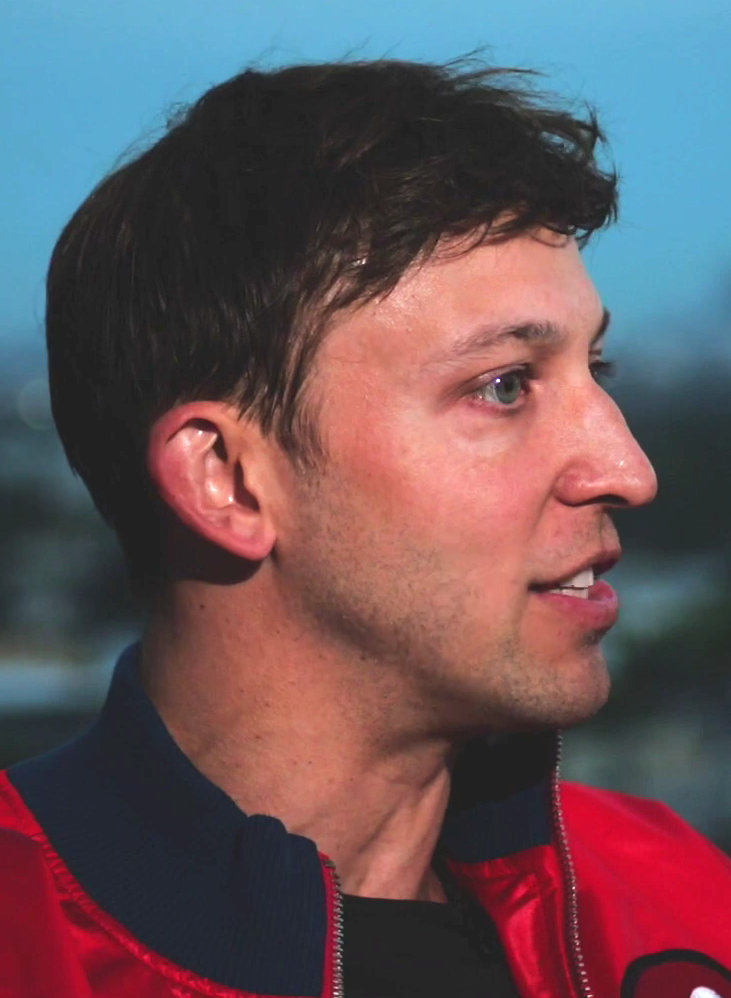
- Steffanina in 2019
- Born: Matthew Jeffery Steffanina; October 20, 1986 (age 39); Charlottesville, Virginia
- Years active: 2007–present

Instagram information
- Page: Matt Steffanina
- Followers: 3.6 million

TikTok information
- Page: Matt Steffanina
- Followers: 8.6 million

YouTube information
- Channels: Matt Steffanina; DNCR Dance Tutorials
- Genre: Dance
- Subscribers: 15.5 million (Matt Steffanina); 3.01 million (DNCR Dance Tutorials)
- Views: 5.03 billion (Matt Steffanina); 223 million (DNCR Dance Tutorials)
- Last updated: July 22, 2026
- Website: mattsteffanina.com

Matthew Jeffery Steffanina (born October 20, 1986) is an American choreographer, former professional dancer, and social media personality known for his dance tutorials. He won The Amazing Race 28 in 2016.

== Early life ==
Matthew Jeffery Steffanina was born on October 20, 1986, in Charlottesville, Virginia. He is of Slovak descent. Before he began getting interested in dancing when he was seventeen, he was a competitive snowboarder. Steffanina taught himself to dance by studying music videos. He became the head choreographer for the University of Virginia hip-hop crew after winning a competition. By 2008, he had become a local dance teacher.

== Career ==
Steffanina started creating videos in 2007, originally just to share his progress with dancing to his friends and family. He then focused on dancing professionally, performing on shows such as So You Think You Can Dance, The Tonight Show with Jay Leno, The Ellen DeGeneres Show, and Step Up, along with other international shows in Europe and Asia. He had also danced for Chris Brown, Lil Wayne, Jermaine Jackson, Tiësto, Jason Derulo, Taylor Swift, Meghan Trainor, Tyga, and Busta Rhymes. He was originally based in the East Coast, moved to Los Angeles in 2010.

Steffanina returned to YouTube in 2015; on his main channel, he created a reality television show, DanceCon and created another channel, DNCR Dance Tutorials. On DNCR, he platformed dance instructors from Los Angeles to provide free, instructional dance content. In 2016, he judged the Go90 television series Dance-Off Juniors. That year, he also won The Amazing Race 28 with fellow choreographer and fiance Dana Boriello, with whom he broke up with later that year. Following his win, he started producing music and DJed at festivals. Steffanina had also invested in real estate and the stock market, taking an interest to cryptocurrency in 2017 and getting involved in NFTs such as Bored Ape later on.

== Awards and nominations ==
Year	Award	Category	Result	Ref.
2016	Streamy Awards	Dance	Nominated	
2017	Shorty Awards	Best in Dance	Nominated	
2017	Streamy Awards	Dance	Nominated	
2018	Streamy Awards	Dance	Won	
2019	Streamy Awards	Dance	Nominated	
2020	Streamy Awards	Dance	Nominated	
2021	Streamy Awards	Dance	Nominated	
2022	Streamy Awards	Dance	Nominated	
2023	Streamy Awards	Dance	Nominated	
