= El Totumo =

Mini-Volcanic Mud Cone in Colombia

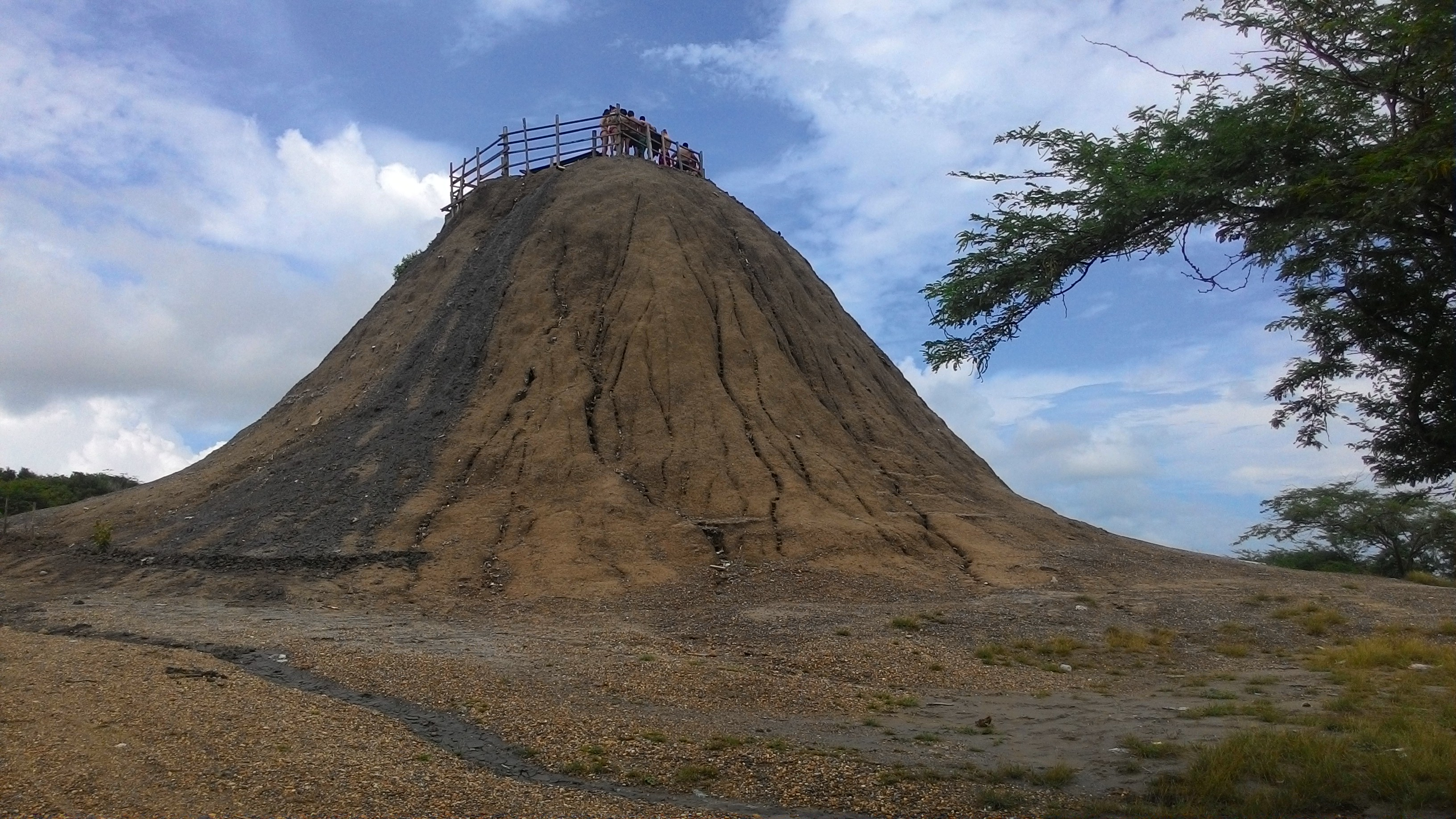

Highest point
- Elevation: 15 m (49 ft)
- Prominence: 15 m (49 ft)
- Coordinates: 10°44′40.1″N 75°14′29.05″W

Geography
- Location: Santa Catalina, Bolívar, Colombia

Geology
- Mountain type: Mud volcano

El Totumo Mud Volcano (Spanish: Volcán de Lodo El Totumo) is an active mud volcano located near sea level in northern Colombia in the municipality of Santa Catalina. A local tourist destination, popular for its alleged healing mud bath, it receives most of its visitors from nearby Cartagena. Along with this, it is the smallest volcano in the country. The mound has a prominence of about 15 m (49 ft) and it is accessible via a staircase that leads to the crater, which can accommodate about 10 to 15 people at a time; there, tourists bathe in the dense, warm mud and have the option of receiving personal massages from the attendants. The experience is then followed by a bath in a nearby lagoon to remove the mud.

According to local lore, the volcano used to spew fire, lava, and ashes, but it was turned into mud by a local priest who believed it was the work of the Devil, and endeavored to banish him by sprinkling holy water into it.

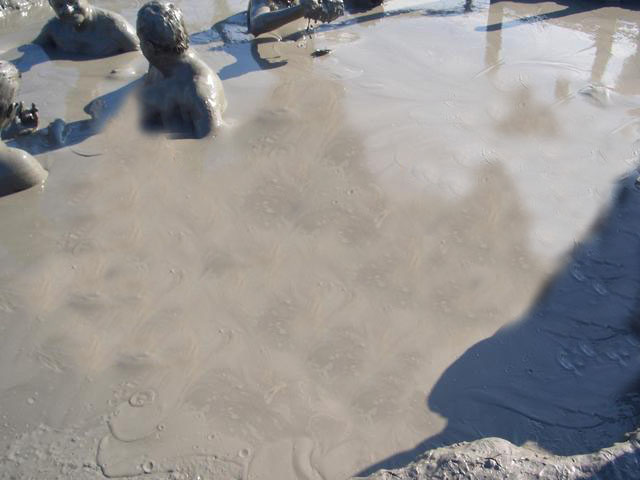
The mud pool of the Totumo mud volcano

== Medicinal properties of the mud volcano ==
The healing properties of the mud of the Totumo volcano are attributed to the chemical composition of the place (water, silica, aluminum, magnesium, sodium chloride, calcium, sulfur, and iron), which according to many therapists are gifts of nature that are used to treat rheumatic problems, detoxify the body, clean the skin and treat joint inflammations. Therefore, although some are only going to enjoy nature and forget about stress, many others go in search of medicine for the ailments and masks to beautify the skin.
