= Joslyn Davis =

On-air host and producer

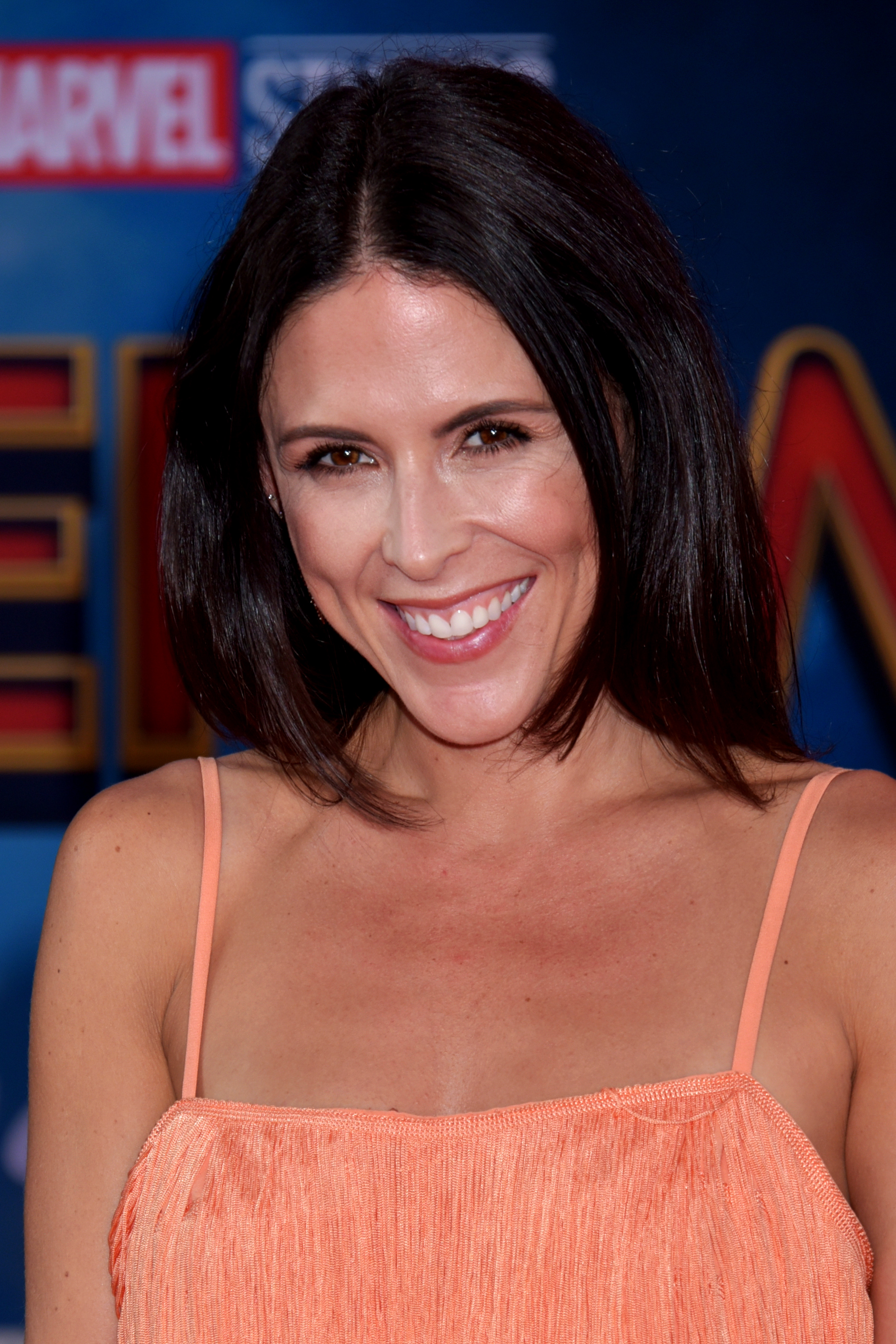
- Davis in 2019
- Born: April 25, 1982 (age 44); Downey, California, U.S.
- Occupations: YouTuber; host
- Years active: 2011–present

Joslyn Davis (born April 25, 1982) is an American former on-air host and producer for ClevverTV, a brand formerly owned and operated by Defy Media. She now appears in YouTube videos produced by Shared Media alongside her friend Lily Marston.

== Early life ==
She completed internships in the media world while attending the University of California, Irvine where she graduated with a Bachelor's in English and a minor in Spanish. She also spent a semester abroad studying at Carlos III University in Madrid, Spain.

== Career ==
Davis was an On-air host and producer for ClevverTV as well as executive producer at Clevver Media who has also hosted and reported for the Project Runway website, Designing Spaces: Think Green on HGTV, Teen.com, California Adventure TV and on Australia's Top National morning show, Sunrise. In 2016, Davis competed in The Amazing Race 28.

In June 2019, she and Lily Marston announced that they had started a company, Shared Media, where she is currently working.

== Filmography ==
=== Television ===
Year	Title	Role	Notes
2016	The Amazing Race	Herself	Competed with friend and coworker Erin Robinson

=== Web ===
Year	Title	Role	Notes
2011	Talent	Fashion Stylist	Episode: "U Don't Suck Like I Thought U Would"
2015-2019	"Beauty Break"	Herself	Host (where it all began) beauty product testing show
2015-2019	"Cheat Day"	Herself	38 episodes, food tasting show
2016-2018	"Lunchy Break"	Herself	Vlog series
2016-2019	"Beauty Trippin"	Herself	Beauty treatment show
