= Brodie Smith (ultimate) =

American ultimate disc player

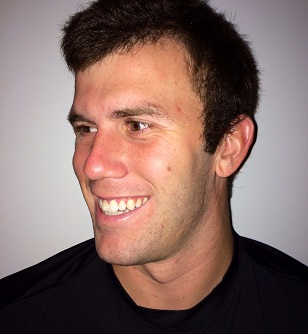
- Smith in 2013
- Born: Jacksonville, Florida, United States
- Education: University of Florida
- Occupations: Ultimate Disc League player, Disc golfer, trick shot performer

Brodie Smith is a former American Ultimate Disc League player, and current professional disc golf player and YouTube personality best known for his frisbee trick shot videos.

Brodie rose to prominence as a premier ultimate player at the University of Florida, where he won two USA Ultimate College Championships, in 2006 and 2010. He also won two National Club Championships, first in 2012 with Austin's Doublewide, and again in 2014 with Denver's Johnny Bravo. He has played professionally with the AUDL's Indianapolis AlleyCats, Chicago Wildfire, Dallas Roughnecks, and Jacksonville Cannons.

Brodie achieved internet fame in 2011 when his Frisbee Trick Shots video became popular on YouTube. As of July 2018, his channel has over 2 million subscribers and 300 million total video views. Clips of Brodie's trick shots have been featured on ESPN's SportsCenter "Top Plays" segment numerous times and other major media outlets, including the Huffington Post. He has a sponsored line of merchandise produced by DiscStore.com

He appeared in the 28th installment of The Amazing Race alongside Ultimate teammate and friend Kurt Gibson, finishing 5th.

As of 2020 he is a professional disc golf player on the DGPT (Disc Golf Pro Tour). He is currently signed to Discraft.

== Ultimate career ==
=== High school ===
Brodie was introduced to Ultimate at Nease High School in Ponte Vedra, Florida where he began playing in games after cross country practice.

=== College ===
Brodie Smith began playing on the Ultimate team at the University of Florida in 2006. That spring, the team won their first National College Championship. In 2007 the UF team finished 3rd and in 2008 finished as the runner up, but In 2009, they were eliminated in the Regional Qualifier. In 2010, the UF men's team won their second national championship victory in 5 years.

=== Professional ===
Brodie Smith began his professional ultimate career with the AUDL playing for the Indianapolis Alleycats in 2011. In 2013, Brodie signed with the Chicago Wildfire. Brodie then suffered a knee injury, tearing his ACL and meniscus. He was unable to play in the 2014 and 2015 season. In 2016, Brodie signed with the Dallas Roughnecks. In 2017, Brodie returned to Florida and signed with the Jacksonville Cannons.

== Flying Disc Trick Shots ==
Brodie's first trick shot video, Frisbee Trick Shots, was released in 2011 on YouTube as a compilation video of trick frisbee throws around Gainesville, Florida and the University of Florida campus. As of December 2015, the video has generated over 5 million views. In the video, Brodie is seen completing throws into trash cans and other targets in increasingly difficult situations. The final shot involves him throwing a disc into a trash can from top of the University of Florida football stadium.

== Personal life ==
Brodie has performed trick shots all over the world, including competing in a Japanese game show, with the goal of using his skills to promote awareness for Ultimate as a sport. Some of them are uploaded to his own account on Instagram and in his fan page: @brodiesmith21fans. His trick shot videos have also led him onto the national media stage with multiple appearances on ESPN Sports Center's Top Plays. Brodie has also created several videos with YouTube trick shot performers Dude Perfect.
