= Aiguille des Grands Montets =

Mountain in France

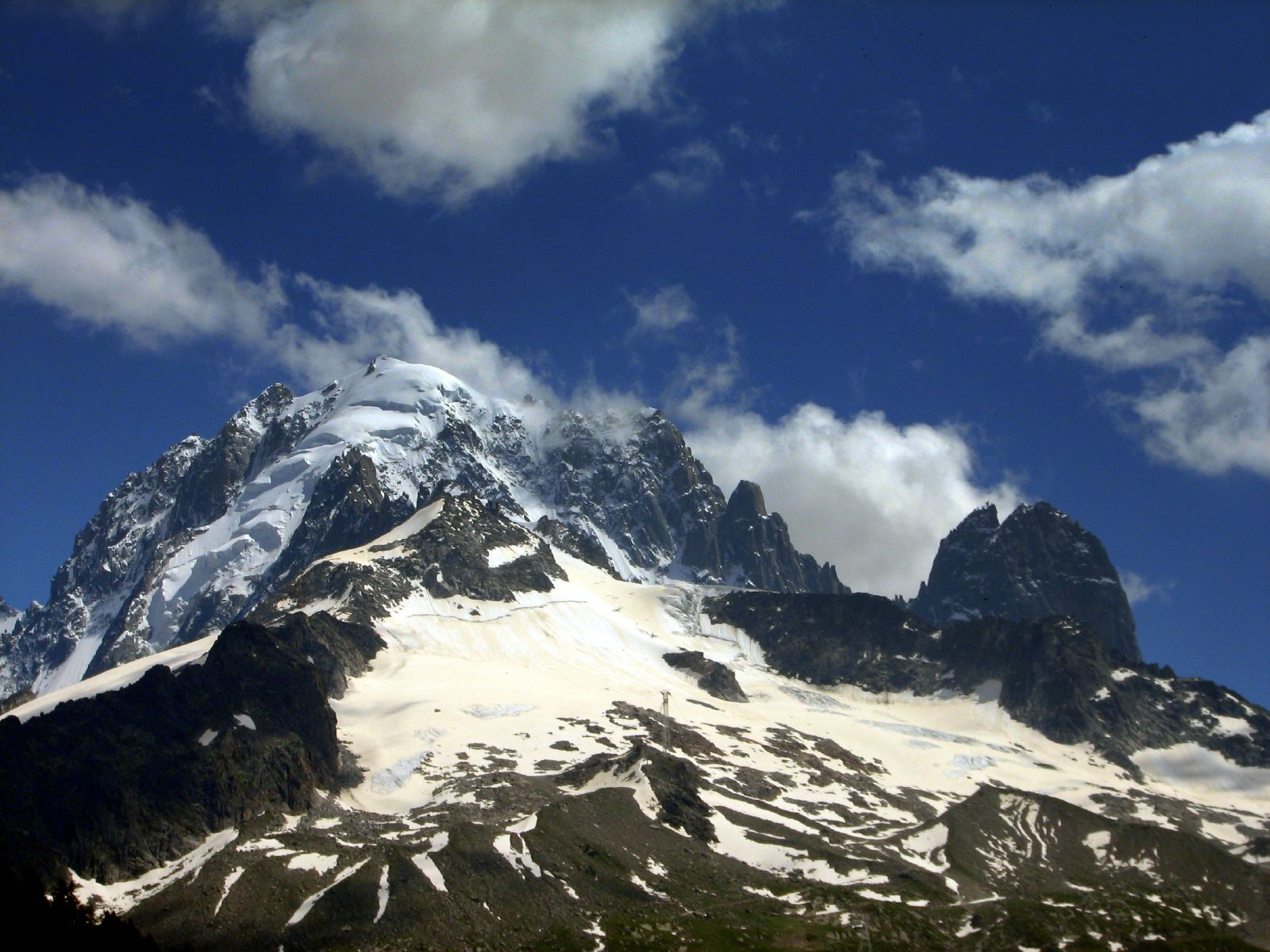

Highest point
- Elevation: 3,295 m (10,810 ft)
- Coordinates: 45°56′53″N 06°57′38″E

Geography
- Location within France
- Location: Haute-Savoie, France
- Parent range: Mont Blanc massif

The Aiguille des Grands Montets (3,295 m) is a mountain in the Mont Blanc massif in Haute-Savoie, France.
