= Santa Catalina, Bolívar =

- Municipality and town
- Flag

- Location of the municipality and town of Santa Catalina, Bolívar in the Bolívar Department of Colombia
- Coordinates: 10°36′14″N 75°17′16″W
- Country: Colombia
- Department: Bolívar Department

Area
  - Total: 223 km^{2} (86 sq mi)

Population (Census 2018)
  - Total: 14,039
  - Density: 63.0/km^{2} (163/sq mi)
- Time zone: UTC-5 (Colombia Standard Time)

Santa Catalina is a town and municipality located in the Bolívar Department, northern Colombia.

== Climate ==
Climate data for Santa Catalina (Galerazamba), elevation 02 m (6.6 ft), (1981–2010)
Month	Jan	Feb	Mar	Apr	May	Jun	Jul	Aug	Sep	Oct	Nov	Dec	Year
Mean daily maximum °C (°F)	29.0 (84.2)	29.3 (84.7)	29.5 (85.1)	30.0 (86.0)	30.9 (87.6)	31.0 (87.8)	30.8 (87.4)	31.0 (87.8)	30.8 (87.4)	30.5 (86.9)	30.2 (86.4)	29.4 (84.9)	30.3 (86.5)
Daily mean °C (°F)	26.5 (79.7)	26.5 (79.7)	26.8 (80.2)	27.3 (81.1)	27.8 (82.0)	27.9 (82.2)	27.8 (82.0)	27.7 (81.9)	27.6 (81.7)	27.5 (81.5)	27.6 (81.7)	27.0 (80.6)	27.4 (81.3)
Mean daily minimum °C (°F)	23.9 (75.0)	23.8 (74.8)	24.5 (76.1)	25.1 (77.2)	25.6 (78.1)	25.0 (77.0)	24.8 (76.6)	25.0 (77.0)	24.9 (76.8)	24.8 (76.6)	24.8 (76.6)	24.3 (75.7)	24.7 (76.5)
Average precipitation mm (inches)	1.0 (0.04)	0.5 (0.02)	4.4 (0.17)	17.0 (0.67)	72.5 (2.85)	91.8 (3.61)	87.6 (3.45)	117.5 (4.63)	122.9 (4.84)	208.7 (8.22)	126.1 (4.96)	25.5 (1.00)	875.3 (34.46)
Average precipitation days (≥ 1.0 mm)	0	0	0	2	7	10	7	10	13	14	8	2	72
Average relative humidity (%)	84	83	82	84	84	84	85	85	85	86	86	85	84
Mean monthly sunshine hours	235.6	194.8	189.1	180.0	179.8	177.0	192.2	198.4	171.0	167.4	186.0	213.9	2,285.2
Mean daily sunshine hours	7.6	6.9	6.1	6.0	5.8	5.9	6.2	6.4	5.7	5.4	6.2	6.9	6.3
Source: Instituto de Hidrologia Meteorologia y Estudios Ambientales
