= Hatsavan, Kotayk =

Hatsavan Հացավան
- Location within Armenia
- Coordinates: 40°08′16″N 44°39′08″E
- Country: Armenia
- Marz (Province): Kotayk

Population (2011)
  - Total: 608
- Time zone: UTC+4 ( )
  - Summer (DST): UTC+5 ( )

Hatsavan (Armenian: Հացավան, also Romanized as Hats’avan and Atsavan; formerly, Avdalar) is a town in the Kotayk Province of Armenia.

== See also ==
- Kotayk Province
