= List of Honest Trailers episodes =

This is a list of Honest Trailers episodes which have been published on YouTube by Screen Junkies. The series, created in 2012, consists of parodic movie trailers. It has been viewed more than 300 million times.

Created by Andy Signore and Brett Weiner, Honest Trailers debuted in February 2012 and by June 2014 had become the source of over 300 million views on the Screen Junkies YouTube channel. The series started when the creators learned that Star Wars: Episode I – The Phantom Menace would be re-released in 3D and decided to make a parody trailer for it, starting the series as a result of the positive reception the videos received. In 2012, a sister series of Honest Game Trailers began to be published on GameFront (then owned by Break Media, the owner of Screen Junkies), initially with James Heaney as narrator, then took a year-long hiatus before it was returned on Smosh Games (then owned by Defy Media) in 2014, with Jon Bailey serving as narrator for both series. Following Screen Junkies' acquisition by Fandom, Honest Game Trailers left Smosh Games and moved to the Fandom Games YouTube channel.

== Episodes ==
=== 2012 ===
No.	Title	Narrator	Honest Title	Original release date
1	"The Phantom Menace 3D"	Ptolemy Slocum	N/A	February 13, 2012
2	"Twilight"	Gannon Nickell	N/A	March 22, 2012
3	"Titanic 3D"	Gannon Nickell	N/A	April 5, 2012
4	"Transformers"	Gannon Nickell	Battleship	May 17, 2012
5	"Avatar"	Dough Medlock	Papyrus	June 14, 2012
6	"The Dark Knight"	Gannon Nickell	N/A	July 16, 2012
7	"The Hunger Games"	Gannon Nickell	N/A	August 17, 2012
8	"The Avengers"	Gannon Nickell	N/A	September 24, 2012
9	"Prometheus"	Gannon Nickell	N/A	October 5, 2012
10	"Paranormal Activity"	Gannon Nickell	N/A	October 18, 2012
11	"The Amazing Spider-Man"	Gannon Nickell	The Not Really That Amazing Spider-Man	November 1, 2012
12	"Twilight 2: New Moon"	Gannon Nickell	N/A	November 16, 2012
13	"Twilight 3: Eclipse"	Gannon Nickell	N/A	November 16, 2012
14	"The Dark Knight Rises (feat. Red Letter Media)"	Gannon Nickell	N/A	December 4, 2012
Red Letter Media appears to discuss the film's plot holes. Last episode in the series not to be announced by usual announcer Jon Bailey.
15	"The Lord of the Rings"	Jon Bailey	N/A	December 11, 2012
First episode in the series to have Jon Bailey as the narrator.

=== 2013 ===
No.	Title	Narrator	Honest Title	Original release date
16	"Inception"	Jon Bailey	N/A	January 8, 2013
17	"Indiana Jones and the Kingdom of the Crystal Skull"	Jon Bailey	N/A	January 22, 2013
18	"Skyfall"	Jon Bailey	N/A	February 5, 2013
19	"The Notebook"	Jon Bailey	The Movie Your Girlfriend will Make You Watch	February 12, 2013
20	"Twilight 4: Breaking Dawn"	Jon Bailey	N/A	March 5, 2013
21	"Les Miserables"	Jon Bailey	Les Miserables (incorrectly pronounced)	March 26, 2013
All narration is sung, reflecting the film's musical nature.
22	"Jurassic Park"	Jon Bailey	N/A	April 2, 2013
23	"Harry Potter"	Jon Bailey	Philosopher's Stone: The One That Started It All; Chamber of Secrets: The One Everyone Hates; Prisoner of Azkaban: The One Everyone Loves; Goblet of Fire: The One With Shovelface; Order of the Phoenix: The One with the Raging Hormones; Half-Blood Prince: The One Where Dumbledore Dies; Deathly Hallows – Part 1: The One You Can Skip; Deathly Hallows – Part 2: The One That Made Adults Cry Like Little Babies	April 16, 2013
Bailey speaks in an English accent in this trailer.
24	"Iron Man 2"	Jon Bailey	N/A	April 30, 2013
25	"Star Trek (2009)"	Jon Bailey	N/A	May 7, 2013
26	"Fast Five (feat. CinemaSins)"	Jon Bailey	N/A	May 21, 2013
Jeremy Scott, the narrator from CinemaSins, has a brief appearance towards the end.
27	"The Last Airbender"	Jon Bailey	N/A	June 4, 2013
28	"Grown Ups"	Jon Bailey	N/A	June 9, 2013
29	"Superman IV: The Quest for Peace"	Jon Bailey	N/A	June 11, 2013
30	"X-Men Origins: Wolverine"	Jon Bailey	N/A	June 16, 2013
31	"Independence Day"	Jon Bailey	N/A	June 25, 2013
32	"Batman & Robin"	Jon Bailey	The Worst Batman Ever	June 30, 2013
33	"Breaking Bad"	Jon Bailey	N/A	August 6, 2013
First Honest Trailer for a TV series.
34	"Star Trek Into Darkness (feat. HISHE)"	Jon Bailey	N/A	August 20, 2013
How It Should Have Ended provides an animated sketch where Spock Prime tells Spock about other villains in the Star Trek franchise.
35	"Iron Man 3"	Jon Bailey	N/A	September 3, 2013
36	"World War Z"	Jon Bailey	Brad Pitt Zombie Movie	September 17, 2013
37	"The Matrix"	Jon Bailey	The Matrix... and its Sequels	October 1, 2013
38	"After Earth"	Jon Bailey	N/A	October 8, 2013
39	"The Walking Dead: Seasons 1–3"	Jon Bailey	N/A	October 15, 2013
40	"Pacific Rim"	Jon Bailey	Awesome Dumb Robot Movie	October 22, 2013
41	"Thor"	Jon Bailey	Thor's Obligatory Movie	October 29, 2013
42	"Man of Steel"	Jon Bailey	N/A	November 12, 2013
43	"Home Alone"	Jon Bailey	N/A	November 26, 2013
44	"The Hobbit: An Unexpected Journey"	Jon Bailey	The Hobbit: A Totally Expected Letdown	December 10, 2013
45	"Dragonball Evolution (feat. TeamFourStar)"	Jon Bailey	N/A	December 24, 2013
The creators of Dragon Ball Z: The Abridged Series appear in character.

=== 2014 ===
No.	Title	Narrator	Honest Title	Original release date
46	"Friday"	Jon Bailey	N/A	January 14, 2014
47	"RoboCop"	Jon Bailey	N/A	January 28, 2014
48	"Thor: The Dark World"	Jon Bailey	N/A	February 4, 2014
49	"Gravity"	Jon Bailey	N/A	February 18, 2014
50	"300"	Jon Bailey	N/A	February 25, 2014
51	"The Hunger Games: Catching Fire"	Jon Bailey	N/A	March 7, 2014
52	"Frozen"	Jon Bailey	N/A	March 11, 2014
Features parodies of the film's songs performed by Emily Kron, Daniel Hartley and Sean Mötley.
53	"Captain America: The First Avenger"	Jon Bailey	Captain America: The First Avengers Trailer	March 25, 2014
54	"Game of Thrones Vol.1"	Jon Bailey	N/A	April 1, 2014
55	"The Wolf of Wall Street"	Jon Bailey	The Wolf of F*cking Wall Street	April 15, 2014
56	"The Spider-Man Trilogy"	Jon Bailey	N/A	April 29, 2014
57	"Star Wars: Episode II – Attack of the Clones"	Jon Bailey	Star Wars: Episode 11 – Attack of the Clones	May 6, 2014
58	"Godzilla (1998)"	Jon Bailey	N/A	May 13, 2014
59	"The X-Men Trilogy"	Jon Bailey	N/A	May 20, 2014
60	"Alice in Wonderland (2010)"	Jon Bailey	N/A	May 27, 2014
61	"Top Gun"	Jon Bailey	N/A	June 3, 2014
62	"The Lion King (feat. AVbyte)"	Jon Bailey	N/A	June 10, 2014
Jon Bailey also speaks in a higher-pitched voice than usual, now something he normally does with animated kids films. Antonius and Vijay of AVbyte sing parody versions of the film's songs.
63	"Transformers: Revenge of the Fallen"	Jon Bailey	N/A	June 17, 2014
64	"Forrest Gump"	Jon Bailey	N/A	June 24, 2014
65	"Planet of the Apes (2001)"	Jon Bailey	Planet of the Apes: The Bad One	July 1, 2014
66	"Green Lantern"	Jon Bailey	N/A	July 15, 2014
67	"Divergent"	Jon Bailey	Not The Hunger Games	July 22, 2014
68	"Teenage Mutant Ninja Turtles 2: The Secret of the Ooze"	Jon Bailey	N/A	August 5, 2014
69	"The Expendables"	Jon Bailey	N/A	August 12, 2014
70	"Captain America: The Winter Soldier"	Jon Bailey	Captain America: He's Cool Now	August 19, 2014
After the trailer, Bailey reads in his trailer announcer voice famous quotes from Robin Williams to pay a tribute to the actor, who had died a few days earlier.
71	"Ghostbusters"	Jon Bailey	N/A	August 26, 2014
72	"The Amazing Spider-Man 2"	Chris Atkinson	N/A	September 2, 2014
Created by CinemaSins. Screen Junkies created an 'Everything Wrong with the Amazing Spider-Man 2' video.
73	"Godzilla (2014)"	Jon Bailey	Godzilla: The Good One	September 9, 2014
74	"The Fault in Our Stars"	Jon Bailey	Cancer F*cking Sucks	September 23, 2014
75	"Transformers: Age of Extinction"	Jon Bailey; Kai-Ting Tiffany Wu	Transformers 4: Welcome to China (变形金刚4：欢迎来到美丽的中国)	October 7, 2014
In reference to the film's last third being set in Beijing and Hong Kong, the remaining third of the episode is narrated in Chinese.
76	"Fight Club"	Jon Bailey	N/A	October 14, 2014
77	"X-Men: Days of Future Past"	Jon Bailey	X-Men: Time Cop	October 21, 2014
78	"Saw"	Jon Bailey	Saw 1: You Saw them All	October 28, 2014
79	"Maleficent"	Jon Bailey	Sleeping Beauty: The Bad One	November 11, 2014
80	"The Little Mermaid (feat. AVbyte)"	Jon Bailey	The Little Waistline	November 18, 2014
Antonius and Vijay of AVbyte sing parody versions of the film's songs.
81	"Love Actually"	Jon Bailey	Sh*t Actually	November 25, 2014
82	"Dawn of the Planet of the Apes"	Jon Bailey	Rise of Dawn of the Start of the Planet of the Apes: Origins: The Beginning	December 2, 2014
83	"Guardians of the Galaxy"	Jon Bailey	Marvel's Space Avengers	December 9, 2014
84	"The Hobbit: The Desolation of Smaug"	Jon Bailey	The Hobbit: Two Down, One To Go	December 16, 2014
85	"Teenage Mutant Ninja Turtles (2014)"	Jon Bailey	Corporate Reboot Cash Grab Turtles	December 23, 2014

=== 2015 ===
No.	Title	Narrator	Honest Title	Original release date
86	"Taken"	Jon Bailey	Tooken	January 6, 2015
87	"Gone Girl"	Jon Bailey	Your Wife Probably Wants to Kill You	January 13, 2015
88	"Pirates of the Caribbean"	Jon Bailey	Jack Sparrow of the Caribbean (And Some Other Pirates)	January 20, 2015
89	"The Maze Runner"	Jon Bailey	The Hunger Maze	January 27, 2015
90	"The Lego Movie (feat. Epic Rap Battles of History – Nice Peter & EpicLLOYD)"	Jon Bailey	The LEGO Commercial	February 3, 2015
Nice Peter and EpicLLOYD of Epic Rap Battles of History, along with Jessica Jablonski, sing a parody of "Everything Is Awesome".
91	"Boyhood"	Jon Bailey	12 Years A Boy	February 10, 2015
This trailer features title cards without an announcer voice, and a parody of the song "Hero" by Sean Mötley plays throughout. Bailey appears briefly at the end to express disappointment over not narrating this trailer and wonders if he will still be paid in spite of his absence.
92	"Dumb and Dumber To"	Jon Bailey	Grown Ups To	February 17, 2015
93	"The Hunger Games: Mockingjay, Part 1"	Jon Bailey	Where's Peeta?: Part 1	March 3, 2015
After the trailer, Bailey reads in his trailer announcer voice famous quotes said by or about the Star Trek character Spock to pay a tribute to actor Leonard Nimoy, who had died a few days earlier.
94	"Cinderella (1950)"	Jon Bailey	Sweeping Beauty	March 10, 2015
Celeste Hudson and Antonius (of AVbyte) sing parody versions of the film's songs.
95	"Leprechaun"	Jon Bailey	The Hobbit: Battle of the Lucky Charmies	March 17, 2015
96	"The Hobbit: The Battle of the Five Armies (feat. HISHE)"	Jon Bailey	The Hobbit: The Bloating of the Five Pages	March 24, 2015
How It Should Have Ended provides an animated sketch in which Frodo Baggins talks to his uncle Bilbo about writing the latter's adventures in a book.
97	"Interstellar"	Jon Bailey	Christopher Nolan's Contact	March 31, 2015
98	"Daredevil (2003)"	Jon Bailey	Batfleck Begins	April 7, 2015
N–A	"Honest Teaser: Batman v Superman: Dawn of Justice"	Jon Bailey	Batman ft. Superman: Rush to the Justice League	April 20, 2015
Redubbed version of the teaser trailer.
99	"Hulk (2003)"	Jon Bailey	Sulk	April 28, 2015
100	"Fifty Shades of Grey (100th Episode!)"	Jon Bailey	Fifty Shades of -Great There's Gonna Be Two More Of These. Good Job, World	May 5, 2015
Jessica Jablonski sings a parody of the film's version of "Crazy in Love".
101	"Pitch Perfect"	Jon Bailey	Mean Gleeks	May 12, 2015
Flula Borg, one of the actors of Pitch Perfect 2, has a brief appearance.
102	"Jupiter Ascending"	Jon Bailey	Wachowskis Descending	May 19, 2015
103	"Armageddon"	Jon Bailey	Drill Hard	May 26, 2015
104	"Entourage (TV)"	Jon Bailey	The Real Douchebags of Broverly Hills	June 2, 2015
105	"The Lost World: Jurassic Park"	Jon Bailey	2 Jurassic 2 Furious	June 9, 2015
106	"Toy Story (feat. Will Sasso)"	Jon Bailey	Toy Story: Yeah, That's Pretty Much What It Is.	June 15, 2015
Will Sasso appears as Randy Newman, singing parody versions of "You've Got a Friend in Me" and "The Time of Your Life". After the trailer, Bailey reads in his trailer announcer voice famous quotes from Sir Christopher Lee to pay a tribute to the late actor, who had died 8 days earlier.
107	"Terminator 2: Judgment Day"	Jon Bailey	Terminator 2 Bad That They Kept Making Sequels	June 23, 2015
108	"Magic Mike"	Jon Bailey	21 Hump Street	June 30, 2015
109	"Iron Man"	Jon Bailey	Marvel Man	July 7, 2015
110	"Super Mario Bros."	Jon Bailey	Super Mari-Oh Brother	July 21, 2015
111	"Mission: Impossible"	Jon Bailey	Franchise: Unkillable	July 28, 2015
112	"Fantastic Four (2005)"	Jon Bailey	Craptastic Bore	August 4, 2015
113	"8 Mile"	Jon Bailey	Eminem: The Movie	August 11, 2015
114	"Kingsman: The Secret Service"	Jon Bailey	Kings – Man that Movie Came Out of Nowhere	August 18, 2015
115	"Mad Max: Fury Road"	Jon Bailey	Mad Max: Road Trip!	August 25, 2015
116	"Frozen Fever"	Jon Bailey	Frozen Reminder	September 1, 2015
117	"The Happening"	Jon Bailey	What the F*ck is Happening?	September 8, 2015
After the trailer, Bailey reads in his trailer announcer voice famous quotes from Wes Craven to pay a tribute to the late director, who had died a few days earlier.
118	"Furious 7"	Jon Bailey	Car Wars: Episode VII	September 15, 2015
119	"Peter Pan"	Jon Bailey	Disney's Michael Jackson	September 22, 2015
120	"Avengers: Age of Ultron"	Jon Bailey	Avengers: Roughly One Week of Ultron	September 29, 2015
121	"Aladdin"	Jon Bailey	A Genie	October 6, 2015
PaperBot provides parodies of the film's songs.
122	"Jurassic World"	Jon Bailey	Raptor Rex VS. DinoShark	October 13, 2015
123	"Back to the Future"	Jon Bailey	Doc & Marty's Excellent Adventure	October 21, 2015
124	"Inside Out"	Jon Bailey	The Feels	October 27, 2015
N–A	"Honest Teaser: The Force Awakens"	Jon Bailey	Star Wars: It's on You, Abrams	November 3, 2015
Redubbed version of the teaser trailer.
125	"Terminator Genisys"	Jon Bailey	Terminator Genesis; Terminator Genishyt	November 10, 2015
126	"Star Wars"	Jon Bailey	Joseph Campbell's Star Wars	November 17, 2015
127	"Fantastic Four (2015)"	Jon Bailey	Fantastic Four: Strike Three	November 24, 2015
128	"Minions"	Jon Bailey	Despicable Greed	December 1, 2015
129	"Ant-Man"	Jon Bailey	Tiny Iron Man	December 8, 2015
130	"Star Wars Ep III: Revenge of the Sith"	Jon Bailey	Star Wars: Episode 111: The Force Aweakens	December 15, 2015
131	"Die Hard"	Jon Bailey	Die Hard in a Building	December 29, 2015

=== 2016 ===
No.	Title	Narrator	Honest Title	Original release date
132	"The Martian"	Jon Bailey	Cast Away in Space	January 5, 2016
133	"Pearl Harbor"	Jon Bailey	Bore-a! Bore-a! Bore-a!	January 12, 2016
After the trailer, Bailey reads in his trailer announcer voice famous song lyrics from David Bowie to pay a tribute to the late singer-songwriter, who had died a few days earlier.
134	"Labyrinth"	Jon Bailey	The Maze Runner	January 19, 2016
After the trailer, Bailey reads in his trailer announcer voice famous quotes from Alan Rickman to pay a tribute to the late actor, who had died a few days earlier.
135	"Agents of S.H.I.E.L.D."	Jon Bailey	Law & Order: Super Victims Unit	January 26, 2016
136	"Spectre"	Jon Bailey	Dullfinger	February 2, 2016
137	"Scott Pilgrim vs. the World"	Jon Bailey	Street Whiner II: Turbo	February 9, 2016
After the trailer, Bailey reads in his trailer announcer voice the line "You're despicable!" with a lisp like that of Daffy Duck to pay a tribute to the late Looney Tunes voice actor Joe Alaskey, who had died on February 3.
138	"The Walking Dead: Seasons 4–6"	Jon Bailey	Yawn of the Dead	February 16, 2016
N–A	"The Oscars"	Jon Bailey	No Money Mo Problems; Furiosa Road (Featuring Mad Max); Frozen; Newsies: Might Want to Avoid These Houses; Not Nearly Enough Spies; Survivor: Mars; You Can Only See So Many Movies; F***ed Up Boyhood	February 23, 2016
A combined Honest Trailer for the eight 2016 Best Picture Oscar nominees.
139	"The Divergent Series: Insurgent"	Jon Bailey	Detergent: Inverted	March 8, 2016
140	"The Hunger Games: Mockingjay – Part 2"	Jon Bailey	Mock—Yeah!--ing—Yeah!--jay—Yeah!--Part 2!	March 15, 2016
141	"Superman (1978)"	Jon Bailey	Fun Man of Steel	March 22, 2016
142	"Batman (1989)"	Jon Bailey	Batman Burtons	March 22, 2016
143	"The Revenant"	Jon Bailey	Hugh Glass And the Terrible, Horrible, No Good, Very Bad Day	March 29, 2016
144	"Star Wars: The Force Awakens"	Jon Bailey; Gannon Nickell; Ptolemy Slocum; Dough Medlock	Star Wars: A Familiar Hope	April 5, 2016
Jon Bailey and former narrator Gannon Nickell take turns narrating the Honest Trailer as fanboys divided on the film. Other former narrators Ptolemy Slocum and Dough Medlock lend their voices in the ending.
145	"The Jungle Book (1967)"	Jon Bailey	The Jungle Bore	April 12, 2016
146	"Superman Returns"	Jon Bailey	Man of Feels	April 19, 2016
147	"Game of Thrones Vol. 2"	Jon Bailey	Clash of Clans	April 26, 2016
After the trailer, Bailey says, "Goodnight Sweet Prince," and, "This is what it sounds like when doves cry," to honor the late musician Prince, who died on April 21, 2016.
148	"Captain America (1990)"	Jon Bailey	Craptain America	May 3, 2016
149	"Deadpool (feat. Deadpool)"	Jon Bailey; Ryan Reynolds	Ferris Bueller Jerks Off	May 10, 2016
Ryan Reynolds reprises his role as Deadpool, the film's protagonist, to help narrate.
150	"Wreck-It Ralph"	Jon Bailey	Pixels	May 17, 2016
151	"X-Men: The Animated Series"	Jon Bailey	X-Men: Better than the Movies	May 24, 2016
152	"Teenage Mutant Ninja Turtles: Out of Their Shells (feat. The Nostalgia Critic)"	Jon Bailey	Teenage Mutant Ninja Turtles: Your Childhood Always Sucked (You Just Didn't Know It)	May 31, 2016
Doug Walker, A.K.A. "The Nostalgia Critic" makes an appearance. The video also includes clips of other TMNT productions and talk show appearances of the Turtles.
153	"Zootopia"	Jon Bailey	Paw & Order	June 7, 2016
After the trailer, Bailey says, "Float like a butterfly, sting like a bee," in honor of the recently deceased boxer Muhammad Ali.
154	"Finding Nemo"	Jon Bailey	Taken	June 14, 2016
155	"Pixels"	Jon Bailey	Sh*tsels	June 21, 2016
After the trailer, Bailey reads quotes from the recently deceased Star Trek actor Anton Yelchin in his honor.
156	"Jaws"	Jon Bailey	Shark Tale	June 28, 2016
157	"Big Hero 6"	Jon Bailey	The Incredi-Tweens	July 5, 2016
158	"Ghostbusters 2"	Jon Bailey	Ghostbusters II: The Secret of the Ooze	July 12, 2016
159	"Batman v Superman: Dawn of Justice"	Jon Bailey	Fans v Batman v Superman v Critics v Other Fans v Executives v Zack Snyder v Expectations: Can't Do Them All Justice; 300 Minutes	July 19, 2016
Extended Edition available on Screen Junkies Plus
160	"The Bourne Trilogy"	Jon Bailey	Finding Bourney	July 28, 2016
161	"Watchmen"	Jon Bailey	Dr. Manhattan or: How I Learned to Stop Worrying and Love the Dong	August 2, 2016
N–A	"The Emmys"	Jon Bailey	Ruskie Business; Better Not Call Him Saul, Because We're Two Seasons in and His Name is Still Jimmy; Downers & Dragons; Spy So-Called Life; Fancy Hats; Byte Club; The Wolf of D.C. I'm Not With Her; Hey Now, I'm a Woman Now.Comtourage; Wacky Room; Not As Modern As Transparent's Family; Everybody Loves Aziz; Black Family Matters; The People v. O. J. Simpson v. Fargo	August 9, 2016
A combined Honest Trailer for the 68th Primetime Emmy Award nominees. Done to promote Honest Trailers' nomination for Outstanding Short Form Variety Series.
162	"Gladiator"	Jon Bailey	Mad Maximus: Fury Rome	August 16, 2016
After the trailer, Bailey says, "That was the droid I was looking for," to honor the recently deceased Star Wars actor Kenny Baker.
163	"The Jungle Book (2016)"	Jon Bailey	Jungle Book Too: The Wrath of Shere Khan	August 23, 2016
164	"Batman: The Killing Joke"	Jon Bailey	Batgirl: Sex and the Gotham City (Followed by The Killing Joke)	August 30, 2016
After the trailer, Bailey reads in his trailer announcer voice quotes from the recently deceased actor Gene Wilder, who died on August 29, 2016.
165	"The Blair Witch Project"	Jon Bailey	Blairinormal Activity	September 6, 2016
166	"Captain America: Civil War"	Jon Bailey	Captain America 3: Avengers 2.5 (Boy, That Escalated Quickly)	September 13, 2016
167	"Teenage Mutant Ninja Turtles: Out of the Shadows"	Jon Bailey	Teenage Mutant Ninja Turtles: Please Go Back into the Shadows	September 20, 2016
168	"Warcraft (feat. MatPat of Game Theory)"	Jon Bailey	Dawn of the Planet of the Orcs	September 27, 2016
169	"The Flash (TV)"	Jon Bailey	Dawson's Streak	October 4, 2016
170	"X-Men: Apocalypse"	Jon Bailey	X-Men: Genisys	October 11, 2016
171	"Ghostbusters (2016)"	Jon Bailey	Ghostbusters: Now Let's Never Speak of this Again	October 18, 2016
Currently the only Honest Trailer with the comments section disabled due to the extreme mixed to negative responses to the Ghostbusters reboot.
172	"The Nightmare Before Christmas"	Jon Bailey	A Christmas Story?	October 25, 2016
This episode features parody versions of two of the film's songs: "This Is Halloween" and "What's This?".
173	"Sherlock (BBC)"	Jon Bailey	Downton Crabby	November 1, 2016
174	"Independence Day: Resurgence"	Jon Bailey	Indumbpendence Day	November 8, 2016
175	"Finding Dory"	Jon Bailey	Finding Money	November 15, 2016
176	"Rudolph the Red-Nosed Reindeer (1964)"	Jon Bailey	Teenage Mutant Red-Nosed Reindeer	November 22, 2016
177	"The Secret Life of Pets"	Jon Bailey	Despicable Pets	November 29, 2016
178	"Suicide Squad"	Jon Bailey	The Dirty Doesn't; The Boondock Taints; Well, That Was Disappointing. Edgelords of the Galaxy	December 6, 2016
Extended Edition available on Screen Junkies Plus
179	"Star Wars: Episode V – The Empire Strikes Back"	Jon Bailey	The Empire Strikes Back ...Of Star Wars	December 13, 2016
180	"Mortal Kombat"	Jon Bailey	Exit the Dragon	December 20, 2016

=== 2017 ===
No.	Title	Narrator	Honest Title	Original release date
181	"Bill and Ted's Excellent Adventure"	Jon Bailey	Duhh & Duhher	January 3, 2017
First of five consecutive trailers chosen by fans for Fan Appreciation Month from a list of fifty options. This was the 5th place choice.
182	"The Princess Bride"	Jon Bailey	Adventure Time	January 10, 2017
Second of five consecutive trailers chosen by fans for Fan Appreciation Month from a list of fifty options. This was the 4th place choice. After the trailer, Bailey reads in his trailer announcer voice quotes from Carrie Fisher and her mother Debbie Reynolds, who died on December 27 and 28, respectively, in 2016.
183	"Space Jam"	Jon Bailey	NBA Jam: Toonament Edition	January 17, 2017
Third of five consecutive trailers chosen by fans for Fan Appreciation Month from a list of fifty options. This was the 3rd place choice.
184	"Willy Wonka & the Chocolate Factory (feat. Michael Bolton)"	Jon Bailey	Saw for Kids	January 24, 2017
Fourth of five consecutive trailers chosen by fans for Fan Appreciation Month from a list of fifty options. This was the 2nd place choice. Features parodies of the film's songs sung by Michael Bolton as well as various quotes from the film read by Bailey after the trailer.
185	"Shrek"	Jon Bailey	Swamp Thing	January 31, 2017
Last of five consecutive trailers chosen by fans for Fan Appreciation Month from a list of fifty options. This was the 1st place choice. Features song parody of the Smash Mouth song "All Star" from the film, performed by EpicLLOYD.
186	"John Wick"	Jon Bailey	A Dog's Purpose	February 7, 2017
187	"Batman Begins"	Jon Bailey	How Bruce Wayne Got His Groove Back	February 14, 2017
N–A	"The Oscars (2017)"	Jon Bailey	Squid Words; If You Say You've Seen This, You're Probably Lyin'; Hell, It's a High Honor Just to Be Nominated; Diary of a Black Math Woman; Manchesta by the Feckin' Sea; All of the Oscar Things; Actors; War and Pieces; Hollywood Hand Job	February 21, 2017
A combined Honest Trailer for the nine 2017 Best Picture Oscar nominees, featuring fictional Tweets by Donald Trump, voiced by Brock Baker, accompanying the "Starring" segment towards the end.
188	"Doctor Strange"	Jon Bailey	Stranger Things	February 28, 2017
189	"Moana"	Jon Bailey	Pacific Swim	March 7, 2017
190	"Beauty and the Beast (1991)"	Jon Bailey	Saved by the Belle	March 14, 2017
191	"Mighty Morphin Power Rangers: The Movie"	Jon Bailey	Teenage Morphin' Ninja Jaegers	March 21, 2017
192	"Fantastic Beasts & Where to Find Them"	Jon Bailey	He Brought a Zoo	March 28, 2017
193	"The Fast and the Furious: Tokyo Drift"	Jon Bailey	Car Wars: Episode III: Revenge of the Shift	April 4, 2017
194	"Rogue One: A Star Wars Story"	Jon Bailey	Rouge One: A Star Wars Story; Suicide Squad: An Unnecessary Star Wars Story	April 11, 2017
195	"Split"	Jon Bailey	10 Cloverfield Room	April 18, 2017
196	"The Social Network"	Jon Bailey	Site Club	April 25, 2017
197	"La La Land & Moonlight"	Jon Bailey	Big Trouble in Little Chiron	May 2, 2017
In the middle of the La La Land Honest Trailer, Jon Bailey interrupts and takes a look at Moonlight instead, putting the focus on the last half on to Moonlight. This is a reference to the announcement of Best Picture at the 89th Academy Awards.
198	"Fifty Shades Darker"	Jon Bailey	Fifty Fifty Chance I Don't Make It Through The Next One	May 9, 2017
199	"Aliens"	Jon Bailey	Aliens. Yep. That Actually Sums It Up Pretty Good.	May 16, 2017
200	"Logan (Feat. Deadpool) – 200th Episode!!"	Jon Bailey; Ryan Reynolds	The Last of Us	May 23, 2017
Ryan Reynolds makes a guest star cameo appearance in the video as Wade Wilson/Deadpool.
201	"Catwoman"	Jon Bailey	Hello Sh*tty	May 30, 2017
202	"Cars & Cars 2"	Jon Bailey	Money	June 6, 2017
203	"Beauty and the Beast (2017)"	Jon Bailey	Reboot-y and the Beast	June 13, 2017
204	"Power Rangers (2017)"	Jon Bailey	Krispy Kremey Power Rangers	June 20, 2017
205	"Despicable Me 1 & 2"	Jon Bailey	Despicable Me-inions	June 27, 2017
206	"The Amazing Spider-Man 2"	Jon Bailey	Spider-Man 2: Electro Boogaloo	July 4, 2017
This was the first film to have multiple Honest Trailers.
207	"Fate of the Furious"	Jon Bailey	Car Wars: Episode VIII: The Last Jetta	July 11, 2017
208	"Memento"	Jon Bailey	Artsy Backwards Movie	July 18, 2017
The segments of the trailer are played in reverse order in homage to the film. Also, after the trailer, Bailey in his announcer voice reads a quote from George A. Romero, who died on July 16.
209	"Ghost in the Shell (2017)"	Jon Bailey	Bicentennial Woman	July 25, 2017
210	"Point Break (1991)"	Jon Bailey	Donnie Brahsco	August 1, 2017
211	"Alien: Covenant"	Jon Bailey	Alien 5: Prometheus 2	August 8, 2017
212	"Guardians of the Galaxy 2"	Jon Bailey	Dad Rock: The Movie	August 15, 2017
N–A	"Honest Retro TV Themes! w/ Michael Bolton & Friends"	N/A	N/A	August 22, 2017
In celebration of their second consecutive Emmy nomination, the creators are joined by Michael Bolton, who brings in other famous artists to sing themes to three of the new nominees in the Best Drama Series for 2017: Natasha Bedingfield does a standard 80's theme for Stranger Things; Brian McKnight spoofs Family Ties and Cheers in tribute of This Is Us; and Paula Cole homages her own song "I Don't Want to Wait" for The Handmaid's Tale. In the end, Bolton himself does a power ballad for his personal favorite show, Game of Thrones, despite being ineligible that year.
213	"Face/Off"	Jon Bailey	Trading/Faces	August 29, 2017
214	"Kong: Skull Island w/ Jordan Vogt-Roberts"	Jon Bailey	Everything Kong With Skull Island in 120 Minutes Or Less	September 5, 2017
Director of the film, Jordan Vogt-Roberts gives his honest take on the film.
215	"The Mummy (2017)"	Jon Bailey	Tom Cruise Runs From Sand (Featuring The Mummy)	September 12, 2017
216	"Wonder Woman"	Jon Bailey	A Justice League Of Her Own	September 19, 2017
217	"Star Trek: The Next Generation"	Jon Bailey	Star Trek: The New Class	September 26, 2017
218	"Blade Runner"	Jon Bailey	RoboCop?	October 3, 2017
219	"Spider-Man: Homecoming"	Jon Bailey	The Perks Of Being a Wallcrawler	October 31, 2017
220	"Stranger Things"	Jon Bailey	Nostalgic Things	November 7, 2017
221	"Batman Forever"	Jon Bailey	Batman Begins to Suck	November 14, 2017
222	"The Emoji Movie"	Jon Bailey	💩 (Poop)	November 21, 2017
223	"The Room"	Jon Bailey	The Room. Not Room. THE Room. Veeery Different.	November 28, 2017
224	"The Santa Clause"	Jon Bailey	The Santa Curse	December 5, 2017
225	"Star Wars: Episode VI – Return of the Jedi"	Jon Bailey	Star Wars III Episode VI Out Of IX (Possibly XII)	December 12, 2017
226	"Jumanji"	Jon Bailey	The Jungle Book: The Game, The Movie	December 19, 2017

=== 2018 ===
No.	Title	Narrator	Honest Title	Original release date
227	"The Boss Baby"	Jon Bailey	GlenBaby Glen Boss	January 2, 2018
First of five 2017 Movies chosen by fans in the Second Annual Fan Appreciation Month. This was the 5th place choice.
228	"mother!"	Jon Bailey	big momma's house 3	January 9, 2018
Second of five 2017 Movies chosen by fans in the Second Annual Fan Appreciation Month. This was the 4th place choice.
229	"It (2017)"	Jon Bailey	Stephen King's	January 16, 2018
Third of five 2017 Movies chosen by fans in the Second Annual Fan Appreciation Month. This was the 3rd place choice.
230	"Get Out"	Jon Bailey	The Stepford Whites	January 23, 2018
Fourth of five 2017 Movies chosen by fans in the Second Annual Fan Appreciation Month. This was the 2nd place choice.
231	"Transformers: The Last Knight"	Jon Bailey	Sigh. Robot.	January 30, 2018
Last of five 2017 Movies chosen by fans in the Second Annual Fan Appreciation Month. This was the 1st place choice.
232	"Showgirls"	Jon Bailey	Strip Up 2 The Streets	February 6, 2018
233	"The Blade Trilogy"	Jon Bailey	What He Slew in the Shadows	February 13, 2018
234	"Justice League"	Jon Bailey	Warner Bros Presents Joss Whedon's Zack Snyder's Justice League Part One ...Of One	February 20, 2018
N–A	"The Oscars (2018)"	Jon Bailey	Grumpy Oldman; The Fish Banging Movie; Loheta; Three Racists Inside Ebbing, Missouri; Method Man; Put a Bird on it Saving Lots Of Privates; Academy Award Nominee The Post; Let The White Ones In	February 27, 2018
A combined Honest Trailer for the nine 2018 Best Picture Oscar nominees.
235	"Thor: Ragnarok"	Jon Bailey	Flash Thordon	March 6, 2018
236	"Bright"	Jon Bailey	Edgelord of the Rings	March 13, 2018
First non-theatrical release covered by Honest Trailers.
237	"Every Wes Anderson Movie"	Ted Evans	N/A	March 20, 2018
A combined Honest Trailer career retrospective of Wes Anderson. Narrated by Ted Evans, impersonating Alec Baldwin. Also, after the trailer, Bailey in his announcer voice reads a quote from physicist Stephen Hawking, who died on March 14.
238	"Star Wars: The Last Jedi"	Jon Bailey; Gannon Nickell	Star Wars: The Last One You'll Pay To See (Until) the Next One Comes Out)	March 27, 2018
Jon Bailey and former narrator Gannon Nickell take turns narrating the Honest Trailer reprising their roles as fanboys divided on the film from The Force Awakens.
239	"Jumanji: Welcome to the Jungle"	Jon Bailey	The Jungle Book: The Game, The Movie, The Reboot, The Video Game	April 3, 2018
240	"The Greatest Showman"	Jon Bailey	Jerk du Soleil	April 10, 2018
241	"Baby Driver"	Jon Bailey	Grand Theft Auto: Wright City	April 17, 2018
242	"The Incredible Hulk"	Jon Bailey	The Disposable Hulk	April 24, 2018
243	"Honest Trailers (Written by a Robot)"	Jon Bailey	School of Ripoffs	May 1, 2018
244	"Fifty Shades Freed"	Jon Bailey	Fifty Shades Free-King Put Me Out of my Misery Already	May 8, 2018
245	"Black Panther"	Jon Bailey	The Aristocat!	May 15, 2018
246	"Star Wars Spinoffs (Holiday Special & More!)"	Jon Bailey	Star Wars: The First Sell Outs	May 22, 2018
An Honest Trailer for all of the Star Wars spinoffs, including Caravan of Courage: An Ewok Adventure, Ewoks: The Battle for Endor, and the Star Wars Holiday Special.
247	"Every Christopher Nolan Movie"	Jon Bailey	N/A	May 29, 2018
A combined Honest Trailer career retrospective of Christopher Nolan.
248	"A Wrinkle in Time"	Jon Bailey	The Lisa Franktrix	June 5, 2018
249	"The Incredibles"	Jon Bailey	This Is Fantastic Forty	June 12, 2018
250	"Jurassic Park 3"	Jon Bailey	The One Where A Dinosaur Says 'Alan'	June 19, 2018
251	"Tomb Raider / Pacific Rim: Uprising"	Jon Bailey	Pacific Twomb Uprimmer	June 26, 2018
252	"The Purge"	Jon Bailey	Fortnite Battle Royale	July 3, 2018
253	"Rampage"	Jon Bailey	Jurassic City	July 10, 2018
254	"A Quiet Place"	Jon Bailey	The Quiet Game	July 17, 2018
Features American Sign Language interpreter Brian Carr.
255	"Ready Player One"	Jon Bailey	VR Troopers	July 24, 2018
256	"Hook"	Jon Bailey	Shudder Island	July 31, 2018
257	"Deep Blue Sea"	Jon Bailey	The Shark Tank Redemption	August 7, 2018
258	"Avengers: Infinity War"	Jon Bailey	Game of Stones	August 14, 2018
259	"Deadpool 2 (Feat. Deadpool)"	Jon Bailey; Ryan Reynolds	Dead Horse	August 21, 2018
Ryan Reynolds returns as Deadpool, interrupts Jon Bailey and mocks the Honest Trailers, with his own Honest Trailer of Honest Trailers.
260	"The Conjuring"	Jon Bailey	Residence Evil	September 4, 2018
261	"Predator"	Jon Bailey	Austrian vs Predator	September 11, 2018
262	"Jurassic World: Fallen Kingdom"	Jon Bailey	The Bland Before Time	September 18, 2018
263	"Solo: A Star Wars Story"	Jon Bailey	Cowboy Beflop: A Screen Junkies Story	September 25, 2018
264	"Gotti"	Jon Bailey	Movie, Pass	October 2, 2018
265	"Doctor Who (Classic)"	Jon Bailey	Inspector Spacetime	October 9, 2018
266	"Doctor Who (Modern)"	Jon Bailey	Days of Our Lives of Future Past	October 9, 2018
267	"Ant-Man and the Wasp"	Jon Bailey	West Coast Avengers	October 16, 2018
268	"Halloween (1978)"	Jon Bailey	Adventures in Babysitting	October 23, 2018
269	"Batman: The Animated Series"	Jon Bailey	This Batman Forever	October 30, 2018
270	"Incredibles 2"	Jon Bailey	Super Smash Bros. Sisters, Moms, And Dads	November 6, 2018
271	"The Meg"	Jon Bailey	Shut Up, Meg	November 13, 2018
272	"Rocky IV"	Jon Bailey	Rocky IV	November 20, 2018
273	"Elf"	Jon Bailey	A Christmas Ferrell	November 27, 2018
274	"Mission: Impossible – Fallout"	Jon Bailey	Stuntman v Superman: Tom of Justice	December 4, 2018
275	"Japanese Spider-Man (Supaidāman)"	Jon Bailey	Weeb of Spider-Man	December 11, 2018
276	"Mary Poppins (1964)"	Jon Bailey	Fantastic Brits and How to Mind Them	December 18, 2018

=== 2019 ===
No.	Title	Narrator	Honest Title	Original release date
277	"Venom"	Jon Bailey	Close Encounters of the Turd Kind	January 1, 2019
278	"Unbreakable"	Jon Bailey	Man of Feels	January 8, 2019
279	"Halloween (2018)"	Jon Bailey	Halloween, Too	January 15, 2019
280	"The Predator"	Jon Bailey	Audience vs. Predator	January 22, 2019
281	"Bird Box"	Jon Bailey	It's Some Birds in a Box	January 29, 2019
282	"Happy Death Day"	Jon Bailey	Loop Her	February 5, 2019
283	"How to Train Your Dragon"	Jon Bailey	How to Prevent the Submission of Your Dragon to the Will of a Homicidal Apex Predator	February 12, 2019
N–A	"The Oscars (2019)"	Jon Bailey	Freddie Queen of Rocks; Black Panther's Third Act Looked Like A PlayStation Cutscene And Did It Really Pick Up Enough Nominations To Win I Personally Liked Infinity War Better And Furthermore... Bohemi-Anne Rhapsody; Oooh! I'm Drivin' Heah!! Juwanna Klan; Dick; Bad Romance; Tidying Up with Yalitza Aparicio	February 19, 2019
A combined Honest Trailer for the eight 2019 Best Picture Oscar nominees featuring Josh Robert Thompson as Mister Rogers.
284	"A Star is Born"	Jon Bailey	The Born Starpremacy	February 26, 2019
Features parodies of the film's songs performed by Matt Citron and Ruby Lewis.
285	"Robin Hood (2018)"	Jon Bailey	Robin Hood: Man, It Bites	March 5, 2019
286	"Fantastic Beasts: The Crimes of Grindelwald"	Jon Bailey	Her Dark Material	March 12, 2019
287	"Aquaman"	Jon Bailey	The Waterboy	March 19, 2019
288	"Every Tim Burton Movie"	Jon Bailey	N/A	March 26, 2019
A combined Honest Trailer career retrospective of Tim Burton.
289	"Spider-Man: Into the Spider-Verse"	Jon Bailey; Felicia Day; Matt Mercer; Vanessa Gritton; Mr. Sunday Movies	Bug Hero Six	April 2, 2019
Jon Bailey is joined by epic voice actors from other universes, including Epic Geek Girl, Epic Dungeon Master, Epic Telenovela Woman and Australian Voice Guy.
290	"Mortal Engines"	Jon Bailey	Mortal Engines	April 9, 2019
291	"Glass"	Jon Bailey	Pass	April 16, 2019
292	"Howard the Duck"	Jon Bailey	Duck Fails	April 23, 2019
293	"Pokémon: The First Movie"	Jon Bailey	Pokémon: The First Movie You Saw When You Were Eight	April 30, 2019
294	"The Mummy (1999)"	Jon Bailey	1001 Arabian Whites	May 7, 2019
295	"Speed"	Jon Bailey	Mr. Woah's Wild Ride	May 14, 2019
296	"Braveheart"	Jon Bailey	White Clansman	May 21, 2019
297	"Men in Black"	Jon Bailey	Guardians of the Galaxy	May 28, 2019
298	"Con Air"	Jon Bailey	Planes, Chains and a Guy from Mobile	June 4, 2019
299	"Captain Marvel"	Jon Bailey	Brie Kree Phone Home	June 11, 2019
300	"MCU"	Jon Bailey	The Neverending Story	June 18, 2019
301	"Waterworld"	Jon Bailey	Wild Wild Wet	June 25, 2019
302	"Wild Wild West"	Jon Bailey	The Not Very Good, The Bad and the Somehow Even Worse	July 2, 2019
303	"Game of Thrones Vol 3 (Seasons 6–8)"	Jon Bailey	A Slog Of Ice And Fire	July 9, 2019
304	"Shazam!"	Jon Bailey	It's Always Sparky in Philadelphia	July 16, 2019
305	"Batman Returns"	Jon Bailey	The Dark Knightmare Before Christmas	July 23, 2019
306	"Alita: Battle Angel"	Jon Bailey	Toy Story	July 30, 2019
307	"Avengers: Endgame"	Jon Bailey	I Love You, 2.8 Billion	August 6, 2019
308	"Masters of the Universe (1987)"	Jon Bailey	Courteney Cox's Dead Parents [Featuring Gwildor]	August 13, 2019
309	"500 Days of Summer"	Jon Bailey	(Love) Well Actually	August 20, 2019
310	"Godzilla: King of the Monsters"	Jon Bailey	Let Them Fight Club	August 27, 2019
311	"IT (1990)"	Jon Bailey	Derry Stories To Tell in the Dark	September 3, 2019
312	"Aladdin (2019)"	Jon Bailey	Lamp, Tramp and Three Smokin' Wishes	September 10, 2019
313	"Dark Phoenix"	Jon Bailey	X-Men 4: X3, Take 2, The Last One	September 17, 2019
314	"Pokémon Detective Pikachu"	Jon Bailey	Who Framed Ryan Reynolds	September 24, 2019
315	"Batman: The Movie (1966)"	Jon Bailey	Batman: The Groovy	October 1, 2019
316	"Spider-Man: Far From Home"	Jon Bailey	the boy who was Friends with Iron Man	October 8, 2019
317	"Zombieland"	Jon Bailey	Brains World	October 15, 2019
318	"Total Recall (1990)"	Jon Bailey	Mars Hard	October 22, 2019
319	"The Shining"	Jon Bailey	So I Married an Axe Murderer	October 29, 2019
320	"The Lion King (2019)"	Jon Bailey	National Geographic Presents Beyonce's Lion King	November 5, 2019
321	"Hobbs & Shaw"	Jon Bailey	Brolo: A Car Wars Story	November 12, 2019
322	"Tangled"	Jon Bailey	Disney's Tower of Terror	November 19, 2019
323	"Jingle All the Way"	Jon Bailey	Last Action Figure	November 26, 2019
324	"It Chapter Two"	Jon Bailey	It Stinks!	December 3, 2019
N–A	"Honest Teaser: Star Wars: The Rise of Skywalker"	Jon Bailey	Star Wars: You Teared Up Don't Lie	December 10, 2019
Redubbed version of the teaser trailer.
325	"Galaxy Quest"	Jon Bailey	Star Trek: Deep Cut Nine	December 17, 2019
326	"Star Wars: The Clone Wars"	Jon Bailey	Star Wars: PS2 Jedi Power Battles	December 24, 2019

=== 2020 ===
No.	Title	Narrator	Honest Title	Original release date
327	"Every Quentin Tarantino Movie"	Jon Bailey	N/A	January 7, 2020
A combined Honest Trailer career retrospective of Quentin Tarantino.
328	"Bad Boys"	Jon Bailey	Blethal Bleapon	January 14, 2020
329	"Joker"	Jon Bailey	Dance Dance Revolution	January 21, 2020
330	"Snow White and the Huntsman / The Huntsman: Winter's War"	Jon Bailey	Wack Mirror	January 28, 2020
331	"Men in Black: International"	Jon Bailey	MIB EU	February 4, 2020
N–A	"The Oscars (2020)"	Jon Bailey	Mattcar v Supercar Le Mans Of Justice; Uncut Gem; Disorder of the Phoenix; White Spouse Down; Summer Of '69; The Whitest Kids You Know; Boy Meets World War II; House Hunters International; Add to my Watchlist	February 6, 2020
A combined Honest Trailer for the nine 2020 Best Picture Oscar nominees.
332	"Terminator: Dark Fate"	Jon Bailey	Terminator DOS	February 11, 2020
333	"Knives Out"	Jon Bailey	The Last P.I.	February 18, 2020
334	"Frozen 2"	Jon Bailey	Rise of Icewalker	February 25, 2020
After the trailer, Bailey reads in his trailer announcer voice the line "I am Spartacus!" to pay a tribute to Kirk Douglas, who had died on February 5.
335	"The Witcher"	Jon Bailey	The Hair Witch Project	March 3, 2020
336	"XXX Franchise"	Jon Bailey	Mission Impossibro	March 10, 2020
337	"Mulan"	Jon Bailey	Big Trouble in Actual China	March 17, 2020
After the trailer, Bailey reads in his trailer announcer voice, "I met Death today, we played chess!" in tribute to Max von Sydow.
N–A	"The Journey of Natty Gann"	Jon Bailey	Lady and Some Tramps	March 20, 2020
Twitter-exclusive episode commissioned by Patton Oswalt for the 50th birthday of his wife Meredith Salenger, who starred in this film.
338	"Star Wars: The Rise of Skywalker"	Jon Bailey	Star Wars Episode IX: The Last Star Wars	March 24, 2020
339	"Justice League: The Snyder Cut"	Jon Bailey	Hashtag The Movie	March 31, 2020
This Honest Trailer is meant to be an April Fools joke.
340	"Birds of Prey"	Jon Bailey	Insane Clown's Posse	April 7, 2020
341	"Cats"	Jon Bailey	Balls Of Furry	April 14, 2020
Features parodies of the film's songs performed by Matt Citron, Isaiah Johnson, Molly Hager, Annie Worden and Dan Hartley.
342	"Tiger King"	Jon Bailey	Animal Crackers	April 21, 2020
After the trailer, Bailey reads in his announcer voice a quote from video game veteran Rick May, who died last week.
343	"Sonic the Hedgehog"	Jon Bailey	Re-Animator	April 28, 2020
344	"Star Wars: Clone Wars (2003)"	Jon Bailey	Star Shorts	May 5, 2020
345	"Blade Runner 2049"	Jon Bailey	Bots Baby	May 12, 2020
After the trailer, Bailey reads in his announcers voice, "Peons Assemble!" as a tribute to Sam Lloyd.
346	"Trolls World Tour"	Jon Bailey	Kidz Bop	May 19, 2020
347	"Friends"	Jon Bailey	Dear White People	May 26, 2020
348	"Twister"	Jon Bailey	Marriage Stormy	June 3, 2020
349	"The Fifth Element"	Jon Bailey	Laidrunner	June 9, 2020
350	"Shrek 2"	Jon Bailey	Kingdom Farts	June 16, 2020
351	"A Goofy Movie"	Jon Bailey	Mad Max: Furry Road Trip	June 23, 2020
Jason Marsden appears at the end of the trailer as Max Goof, reading the comments as the character.
352	"The NeverEnding Story"	Jon Bailey	My Beautiful Dark Twisted Fantasia	June 30, 2020
353	"Indiana Jones Trilogy"	Jon Bailey	Adventure Time	July 7, 2020
354	"The Rock"	Jon Bailey	Dwayne Johnson	July 14, 2020
After the trailer, Bailey reads in his announcer voice "The Devil went down to Georgia, looking for a soul to steal." to pay tribute to Charlie Daniels who had died a week ago.
355	"Cowboy Bebop"	Jon Bailey	Blade Lounger	July 21, 2020
356	"E.T. the Extra-Terrestrial"	Jon Bailey	A.T.H.F. Awkward Tween Hunger Force	July 28, 2020
The trailer mostly compares E.T. to Mac and Me. After the trailer, Bailey reads in his announcer voice "And he lived happily ever after, to the end of his days." as a tribute to Sir Ian Holm, who died on June 19, 2020.
357	"Starship Troopers (ft Casper Van Dien)"	Jon Bailey	Saving Private Rico	August 4, 2020
Leading actor Casper Van Dien interrupts Jon Bailey and does the "starring".
358	"Avatar: The Last Airbender"	Jon Bailey	Earth Wind Aang Fire	August 11, 2020
359	"The Old Guard"	Jon Bailey	Bad Boys for Life	August 18, 2020
360	"Mean Girls"	Jon Bailey	White Chicks	August 25, 2020
361	"The Boys"	Jon Bailey	All Super-Cops are B*********	September 1, 2020
362	"Batman: Mask of the Phantasm"	Jon Bailey	Batman Forever Alone	September 8, 2020
After the trailer, Bailey reads in his announcer voice "Wakanda Forever", a tribute to Chadwick Boseman, who died on August 28, 2020.
363	"Mulan (2020)"	Jon Bailey	The Emperor's New Dude	September 15, 2020
364	"Every Streaming Service"	Jon Bailey	Qwickster; Too Many Treks; Half-Cocked; Cyberdyne Prime; 7 Minutes in Meh-ven; America's Saddest Home Videos; Friends With Benefits; Disney - iPass; The Mickey Mouse Hub	September 22, 2020
365	"Firefly"	Jon Bailey	Jossed in Space	September 29, 2020
366	"The Kissing Booth"	Jon Bailey	Not Another Teen Movie (Until You've Learned Your Lesson)	October 6, 2020
367	"Scream"	Jon Bailey	Scary Movie What? That's What They Were Actually Going To Call It.	October 13, 2020
368	"Us"	Jon Bailey	Attack of the Clones	October 20, 2020
369	"The Mandalorian"	Jon Bailey	The Outer Rim Job	October 27, 2020
370	"National Treasure"	Jon Bailey	Red White & Blue's Clues	November 3, 2020
371	"The Evil Dead Movies"	Jon Bailey	The Deadass Chainsaw Massacre	November 10, 2020
At the end of the trailer, Bailey reads in his announcer voice "Uh, just a drink. A martini, shaken not stirred." as a tribute to the legendary actor, Sean Connery, who died on October 31, 2020.
372	"Toy Story 4"	Jon Bailey	Child's Play	November 17, 2020
373	"The New Mutants"	Jon Bailey	Teenage Mutants Facing Hurdles	November 24, 2020
374	"A Christmas Story"	Jon Bailey	A Christmas Sketch Show	December 1, 2020
Zack Ward appears at the end of the trailer as Scut Farkus and bullies Jon Bailey. This is followed by him reading the comments as the character.
375	"Donnie Darko"	Jon Bailey	28 Days Later	December 8, 2020
After the trailer, Bailey reads in his announcer's voice "Luke, I am a paid actor, David Prowse." to pay tribute to the Darth Vader performer, who died on November 28, 2020.
376	"Lost"	Jon Bailey	Lost [No, Really, I'm Totally Lost. Can You Explain It Again?]	December 15, 2020
377	"Tenet"	Jon Bailey	A Man A Plan A Canal Panama	December 22, 2020
After the trailer, Bailey reads in his announcer voice "That's my bike, punk!" to pay tribute to Tommy Lister Jr., who died on December 10, 2020.
378	"2020 (feat. Patton Oswalt)"	Jon Bailey; Patton Oswalt	Stay in Alive	December 29, 2020

=== 2021 ===
No.	Title	Narrator	Honest Title	Original release date
379	"The Shawshank Redemption"	Jon Bailey	Prison Break	January 5, 2021
380	"Wonder Woman 1984"	Jon Bailey	CNP Cheetahs Never Prosper	January 12, 2021
381	"Cobra Kai"	Jon Bailey	Breaking Board	January 19, 2021
382	"Street Fighter"	Jon Bailey	Chortle Kombat	January 26, 2021
383	"The Mandalorian Season 2"	Jon Bailey	The Masked Slinger	February 2, 2021
384	"Romeo + Juliet"	Jon Bailey	It's Lit	February 9, 2021
385	"Lilo & Stitch"	Jon Bailey	Galaxy Pest	February 16, 2021
386	"The Simpsons Movie"	Jon Bailey	Infinite Seasons and a Movie	February 23, 2021
387	"Coming to America"	Jon Bailey	The Prince's Bride	March 2, 2021
388	"Kung Fu Panda"	Jon Bailey	School Of Wok	March 9, 2021
389	"WandaVision"	Jon Bailey	Hex and the City	March 16, 2021
390	"Raya & The Last Dragon"	Jon Bailey	The Life Aquatic with Team Sisu	March 23, 2021
391	"Zack Snyder's Justice League"	Jon Bailey	Justice League: Bigger Longer & Uncut	March 30, 2021
392	"Godzilla vs. Kong"	Jon Bailey	Alike Titan's Punch-Out	April 6, 2021
N–A	"The Oscars (2021)"	Jon Bailey	Chicken Soup for the Liberal Soul; At Least Nominate Delroy Lindo, You Cowards; Crank Mankers; Deaf Jam; Bucket Pissed; Don't Kill Bill For Some Reason; Veggie Tales; The Downer	April 13, 2021
A combined Honest Trailer for the eight 2021 Best Picture Oscar nominees.
393	"Reefer Madness & The Big Lebowski"	Jon Bailey	High Crimes & Blissed Demeanors	April 20, 2021
394	"John Wick: Chapter 2 & Chapter 3 – Parabellum"	Jon Bailey	John Wick 2 & 3: Lorem Ipsum	April 27, 2021
395	"The Falcon and the Winter Soldier"	Jon Bailey	Sky Captain and the Shield Of Tomorrow	May 4, 2021
396	"Mortal Kombat (2021)"	Jon Bailey	Unreal Tournament	May 11, 2021
397	"Money Plane (ft Pitch Meeting)"	Jon Bailey	Stakes on a Plane	May 18, 2021
During the episode, Ryan George of Screen Rant appears to do one of the Pitch Meetings about Money Plane.
398	"The DCEU"	Jon Bailey	Crisis For Infinte Dorks	May 25, 2021
399	"Army of the Dead"	Jon Bailey	World War Zzzzzzzz	June 1, 2021
400	"Invincible"	Jon Bailey	Splotchmen	June 8, 2021
401	"Cruella"	Jon Bailey	How Estella Got Her Cruel Back	June 15, 2021
402	"The Fast and the Furious"	Jon Bailey	Car Wars: Rise of Paul Walker	June 22, 2021
403	"Luca"	Jon Bailey	Chum & Chummer	June 29, 2021
404	"Demon Slayer: Mugen Train"	Jon Bailey	Demon The Tank Engine's Big Adventure	July 6, 2021
After the trailer, Bailey reads in his announcer voice, "The seaweed is always greener in somebody else's lake.", in honor of Samuel E. Wright, who died on May 24, 2021.
405	"Ted Lasso"	Jon Bailey	Cornballers	July 13, 2021
406	"Black Widow"	Jon Bailey	In Soviet Russia M C's U	July 20, 2021
407	"Space Jam: A New Legacy"	Jon Bailey	It's Not TV, It's An Ad For HBO	July 27, 2021
408	"G.I. Joe Rise of Cobra & Retaliation"	Jon Bailey	Body Massage Origins	August 3, 2021
409	"Loki"	Jon Bailey	Chrono Trigger	August 10, 2021
410	"The Suicide Squad"	Jon Bailey	Suicide Squad: We're Sorry & We Promise We Did Better This Time	August 17, 2021
411	"F9: The Fast Saga"	Jon Bailey	Car Wars Episode 9: The Phantom MeNOS	August 24, 2021
412	"Iron Fist"	Jon Bailey	Stunt Double in Little China	August 31, 2021
413	"Clueless"	Jon Bailey	Marvel's As If...?	September 7, 2021
414	"Snake Eyes: G.I. Joe Origins"	Jon Bailey	Battles Without Honor and/or Clarity	September 14, 2021
415	"Jungle Cruise"	Jon Bailey	Raiders of the Lost Bark	September 21, 2021
416	"Dune (1984)"	Jon Bailey	Dune, Worm's My Car	September 28, 2021
417	"Star Wars: Visions"	Jon Bailey	Star Weeb: Content	October 5, 2021
418	"Squid Game"	Jon Bailey	The Bummer Olympics	October 12, 2021
419	"Every Connery Bond"	Jon Bailey	The Spy Who F*cked Me	October 19, 2021
420	"Halloween Kills"	Jon Bailey	This is 40 (Years ago when Michael Myers killed my family)	October 26, 2021
421	"What If...?"	Jon Bailey	But Why...?	November 2, 2021
422	"Hackers"	Jon Bailey	Netscape Navigators	November 9, 2021
423	"Dune (2021)"	Jon Bailey	Very Spice!	November 16, 2021
424	"Shang-Chi and the Legend of the Ten Rings"	Jon Bailey	Once Upon A Time in a China Adjacent Pocket Dimension	November 23, 2021
425	"No Time to Die"	Jon Bailey	James and the Giant Breach	November 30, 2021
426	"Venom: Let There Be Carnage"	Jon Bailey	Venom: Let Him F*ck Carnage	December 7, 2021
427	"Red Notice"	Jon Bailey	Too Many Crooks	December 14, 2021
428	"How the Grinch Stole Christmas"	Jon Bailey	10 Things I Hate About Who	December 21, 2021

=== 2022 ===
No.	Title	Narrator	Honest Title	Original release date
429	"The Matrix Resurrections"	Jon Bailey	The Great Trin Robbery	January 11, 2022
430	"Hawkeye"	Jon Bailey	Ronin with the Homies	January 18, 2022
431	"Eternals"	Jon Bailey	Eternal Runtime of the Plotless Grind	January 25, 2022
432	"The Witcher (Season 2)"	Jon Bailey	Snow White Flame and the Gruntsman	February 1, 2022
433	"Arcane"	Jon Bailey	Lol: Whut	February 8, 2022
434	"Ghostbusters: Afterlife"	Jon Bailey	Ghostbusters: Please Don't Get Angry This Time	February 15, 2022
435	"Encanto"	Jon Bailey	Disney's Haunted by your Tragic Past Mansion	February 22, 2022
436	"The Book of Boba Fett"	Jon Bailey	Bacta the Future	March 1, 2022
437	"Scream (2022) ft Ghostface!!"	Jon Bailey	Ghostface Jam: A New Legacy	March 8, 2022
Roger L. Jackson appears in this episode as Ghostface.
438	"Free Guy"	Jon Bailey	Ryan Reynolds And The Terrific, Heroical, Not Just Good, Very Great Day	March 15, 2022
N–A	"The Oscars (2022)"	Jon Bailey	Tony-o and Juliet; Who Let the Dogs Out; Exit Through the Grift Op; Saab Story; Served Outta Compton; Da Rue: Endstorm; Once Upon a Haim in North Hollywood; Big Troubles in Northern Ireland; Signfeld; Smarmageddon	March 22, 2022
A combined Honest Trailer for the ten 2022 Best Picture Oscar nominees.
439	"Spider-Man: No Way Home"	Jon Bailey	The Adventures of Pete & Pete & Pete	March 29, 2022
440	"Ghost Rider 1 & 2"	Jon Bailey	Spawn in 60 Seconds	April 5, 2022
441	"The Legend of Vox Machina"	Jon Bailey	D&Deez Nutz	April 12, 2022
Matthew Mercer appears in this episode.
442	"The Jackass Movies"	Jon Bailey	Pains, Strains & Ohgodmyballs	April 19, 2022
443	"Moonfall"	Jon Bailey	White Rock Down	April 26, 2022
444	"The Batman"	Jon Bailey	The Twiknight Saga	May 3, 2022
445	"Uncharted"	Jon Bailey	Tom Raider	May 10, 2022
446	"Moon Knight"	Jon Bailey	One Flew Over The Khonshu's Nest	May 17, 2022
447	"Morbius"	Jon Bailey	Sh***y Sh***y Fang Fang	May 24, 2022
448	"Sonic the Hedgehog 2"	Jon Bailey	Speed 2: Blues Control	May 31, 2022
449	"Fantastic Beasts: The Secrets of Dumbledore"	Jon Bailey	Hairy Politics and the Qilin of a Villain	June 7, 2022
450	"Goodfellas"	Jon Bailey	White Men-ace 2 Society	June 14, 2022
451	"Halo"	Jon Bailey	Bored of the Ring	June 21, 2022
452	"Obi-Wan Kenobi"	Jon Bailey	Ben, Her	June 28, 2022
453	"Doctor Strange in the Multiverse of Madness"	Jon Bailey	Doctor Strange in One Alternate Universe That's Basically Just the Near Future	July 5, 2022
454	"Stranger Things (Season 4)"	Jon Bailey	Epic Creel Time	July 12, 2022
455	"Hulk vs. Thor (1988)"	Jon Bailey	Beating a Dead Norse	July 19, 2022
456	"Ms. Marvel"	Jon Bailey	Next of Djinn	July 26, 2022
457	"The Gray Man"	Jon Bailey	Bourne Again	August 2, 2022
458	"RRR"	Jon Bailey	BFF	August 9, 2022
459	"Jurassic World Dominion"	Jon Bailey	Jurassic World Episode 6: The Clone Wars	August 16, 2022
460	"Minions: The Rise of Gru"	Jon Bailey	Gruassic World Da Minions	August 23, 2022
461	"Top Gun: Maverick"	Jon Bailey	Hot Shots: Part Cruise	August 30, 2022
462	"Nope"	Jon Bailey	They Shloops Horses, Don't They?	September 6, 2022
463	"Thor: Love and Thunder"	Jon Bailey	Finding Chemo	September 13, 2022
464	"Screen Rant Pitch Meetings"	Jon Bailey	This Pitchable Me	September 15, 2022
Crossover with Screen Rant's Pitch Meeting for that show's 300th episode
465	"Elvis"	Jon Bailey	Baz ft. The Music of Elvis	September 20, 2022
466	"The Sandman"	Jon Bailey	Little Emo's Adventures in Slumberland	September 27, 2022
467	"Avatar (2022 Remastered)"	Jon Bailey	James and the Giant Preach	October 4, 2022
468	"Hocus Pocus"	Jon Bailey	The Schlocky Horror Picture Show	October 11, 2022
Emma Fyffe narrates part of the episode imitating Carrie Bradshaw, and Jason Marsden appears as Thackery Binx.
469	"She-Hulk: Attorney at Law"	Jon Bailey	Law & Ogre: Super Victims Unit	October 18, 2022
470	"Lord of the Rings: The Rings of Power (Season 1)"	Jon Bailey	Amazon Presents The Lord of the Rings: The Rings of Power Season 1 of 5: Galadriel's Origins: Sauron Begins	October 25, 2022
471	"House of the Dragon"	Jon Bailey	Regally Blonde	November 1, 2022
472	"Home Alone 2: Lost in New York"	Jon Bailey	Home Alone 2: Moppet Takes Manhattan	November 8, 2022
473	"Saving Private Ryan"	Jon Bailey	National Platoon's European Formation	November 15, 2022
474	"Pocahontas"	Jon Bailey	Love at First White	November 22, 2022
Emma Fyffe sings a parody of "Colors of the Wind". After the trailer, Bailey reads various quotes from Batman: The Animated Series to pay tribute to voice actor Kevin Conroy, who died on November 10, 2022.
475	"Hancock"	Jon Bailey	I Was Legend	November 29, 2022
After the trailer, Bailey reads in his announcer voice "I need Dragonzord Power, now!" to pay tribute to Power Rangers star Jason David Frank, who had died on November 19, 2022.
476	"Andor"	Jon Bailey	Empire Wreckers	December 6, 2022
477	"Black Adam"	Jon Bailey	Adam Ruins Everything	December 13, 2022
478	"Every 2022 Pinocchio Movie"	Jon Bailey	Enpino Man; Forrest Stump; Mourning Wood	December 20, 2022

=== 2023 ===
No.	Title	Narrator	Honest Title	Original release date
479	"Glass Onion: A Knives Out Mystery"	Jon Bailey	Dial S for Sh*thead	January 10, 2023
480	"Demolition Man"	Jon Bailey	Jacked to the Future	January 17, 2023
481	"Snakes on a Plane"	Jon Bailey	Black Snake Flown; Reptile Wins; Ten Points for Slitherin; Monty Python's Flying Serpents	January 24, 2023
482	"M3GAN"	Jon Bailey	Shut Up, M3G	January 31, 2023
483	"Black Panther: Wakanda Forever"	Jon Bailey	Catwoman vs. Aguaman	February 7, 2023
484	"Titanic (2023 Remaster)"	Jon Bailey	It Sinks!	February 14, 2023
485	"Bloodsport"	Jon Bailey	Mortal Kumbat	February 21, 2023
486	"Velma"	Jon Bailey	Ruc No!	February 28, 2023
N–A	"The Oscars (2023) (The Best Picture Nominees)"	Jon Bailey	Tick Tick... Groom; Cinema Therapisto; Greed 2: Cruise Control; The King's Leech; 12 Angry Mennonites; Soldier Boy Tell Em; World War Weeee! The Life Aquatic with James Cameron; Farrell Got Fingered; Yeoh A24 Raps	March 7, 2023
A combined Honest Trailer for the ten 2023 Best Picture Oscar nominees.
487	"The Goonies"	Jon Bailey	The Goondock Saints	March 14, 2023
488	"Everything Everywhere All at Once"	Jon Bailey	Crazy Switched Asians	March 21, 2023
489	"Dragon Ball Super: Super Hero"	Jon Bailey	The Fast and the Burliest	March 28, 2023
490	"The Last of Us"	Jon Bailey	The Last of Us – All Cutscenes 4K	April 4, 2023
491	"Avatar: The Way of Water"	Jon Bailey	Go Fish!	April 11, 2023
492	"Shazam! Fury of the Gods"	Jon Bailey	Teen Titans? No!	April 18, 2023
493	"Ant-Man and the Wasp: Quantumania"	Jon Bailey	The Itty Bitty Witty Committee	April 25, 2023
494	"Se7en"	Jon Bailey	2 K1ll 4 M0ck1n6 N3rd	May 2, 2023
495	"The Mandalorian Season 3"	Jon Bailey	Time for Din Din	May 9, 2023
496	"Dungeons & Dragons: Honor Among Thieves"	Jon Bailey	Party of Five	May 16, 2023
497	"The Super Mario Bros. Movie"	Jon Bailey	Super Cash Bros.	May 23, 2023
498	"John Wick: Chapter 4"	Jon Bailey	John Wick Chapter 4 Parabellum 2	May 30, 2023
499	"The Transformers: The Movie"	Jon Bailey	The Assassination of Optimus Prime by the Coward Hasbro	June 6, 2023
500	"The Flash (90's Trilogy)"	Jon Bailey	The Quick and the Red	June 13, 2023
501	"Fast X"	Jon Bailey	Car Wars Episode 10 Return of the Jetta	June 20, 2023
502	"The Da Vinci Code"	Jon Bailey	There's Something About Mary	June 27, 2023
503	"Team America: World Police"	Jon Bailey	Stringsman: The Not So Secret Service	July 4, 2023
504	"Edge of Tomorrow"	Jon Bailey	Alien War: Any % Speedrun (New World Record); Live. Die. Rename. Starship Loopers; Saving Private Dying; Groundhog Slay	July 11, 2023
505	"Guardians of the Galaxy Vol. 3"	Jon Bailey	Close Encounters for a Third Time	July 18, 2023
506	"Transformers: Rise of the Beasts"	Jon Bailey	We Fought A Zoo	July 25, 2023
507	"The Flash"	Jon Bailey	The Flop	August 1, 2023
508	"Secret Invasion"	Jon Bailey	Invasion of the Body Matchers	August 8, 2023
509	"The Little Mermaid (2023)"	Jon Bailey	Feet Pray Love	August 15, 2023
510	"Spider-Man: Across the Spider-Verse"	Jon Bailey	Lo-Fi Hip Hop Beats To Fight To	August 22, 2023
511	"Speed Racer"	Jon Bailey	Fast Times I'm Really High	August 29, 2023
512	"Ferris Bueller's Day Off"	Jon Bailey	Chicago White Spots	September 5, 2023
513	"Indiana Jones and the Dial of Destiny"	Jon Bailey	Wrinkled in Time	September 12, 2023
514	"Barbie"	Jon Bailey	Guys & Dolls	September 19, 2023
515	"One Piece"	Jon Bailey	Yo Ho Yo Ho, A Pirate Show for Tweens	September 26, 2023
516	"The Boys season 2 & season 3"	Jon Bailey	War for the Planet of the Capes	October 3, 2023
517	"Blue Beetle"	Jon Bailey	A Bug's Strife	October 10, 2023
518	"Ahsoka"	Jon Bailey	Star Wars: Jumping The Whale	October 17, 2023
519	"Mission: Impossible – Dead Reckoning Part One"	Jon Bailey	Mission: Improbable – Stunt on These Foes	October 24, 2023
520	"Buffy the Vampire Slayer"	Jon Bailey	Quippy The Vampire Serial	October 31, 2023
521	"Five Nights at Freddy's"	Jon Bailey	Nights of the Living Dead Kids	November 7, 2023
522	"American Sniper"	Jon Bailey	Vet Hot American Camper	November 14, 2023
523	"Paul Blart: Mall Cop"	Jon Bailey	Pie Hard	November 21, 2023
524	"Oppenheimer"	Jon Bailey	The Big Bang Theory	November 28, 2023
525	"Loki Season 2"	Jon Bailey	Hot Tom Time Machine	December 5, 2023
526	"Charlie and the Chocolate Factory"	Jon Bailey	The Hunger Games	December 12, 2023
527	"The Year 2023"	Jon Bailey	Stars War: Episode 23 – The Broke Writer Strikes Back	December 19, 2023

=== 2024 ===
No.	Title	Narrator	Honest Title	Original release date
528	"Rebel Moon – Part One: A Child of Fire"	Jon Bailey	Space Cram	January 9, 2024
529	"The Hunger Games: The Ballad of Songbirds & Snakes"	Jon Bailey	The Hunger Games: Even Hitler Had A Girlfriend	January 16, 2024
530	"The Marvels"	Jon Bailey	The Marvelous Misses' Space-Holes	January 23, 2024
531	"Aquaman and the Lost Kingdom"	Jon Bailey	Hairy Waters and the Deathly Shallows	January 30, 2024
532	"Wonka"	Jon Bailey	Chocolate Salty Brawls	February 6, 2024
533	"Brokeback Mountain"	Jon Bailey	Earnest Bros To Camp	February 13, 2024
534	"No Country for Old Men"	Jon Bailey	Even Cowboys Get The Blues	February 20, 2024
535	"Arrival"	Jon Bailey	Words with Friends	February 27, 2024
N–A	"The Oscars (2024) (The Best Picture Nominees)"	Jon Bailey	Holup, Let Him Book; Atom & Eve; Frankenstein: A XXX Parody; Bi, Felicia; Christmas with the Crank; Close Encounters of the 3rd Wheel; Law & Order: Sacre Bleu! Killer of a Whole Afternoon; The Real Frauleins of South Poland	March 5, 2024
A combined Honest Trailer for the ten 2024 Best Picture Oscar nominees.
536	"Avatar: The Last Airbender (Netflix Series)"	Jon Bailey	Avatar: Abridged Too Far	March 12, 2024
537	"Road House (1989)"	Jon Bailey	Bar Rescue	March 19, 2024
538	"Madame Web"	Jon Bailey	Barking Spiders	March 26, 2024
539	"Ex Machina"	Jon Bailey	Do Androids Dream of Eclectic Geeks?	April 9, 2024
540	"Sherlock Holmes (2009) & Game of Shadows"	Jon Bailey	'Lock, Doc in Two Joking Perils	April 16, 2024
541	"Dune: Part Two"	Jon Bailey	2une	April 23, 2024
542	"Fallout Season 1"	Jon Bailey	Apocalypse Then	April 30, 2024
543	"Rebel Moon – Part Two: The Scargiver"	Jon Bailey	Harvest Moon 2: Pain & Grain	May 7, 2024
544	"Star Wars: Episode I – The Phantom Menace 25th Anniversary"	Jon Bailey	Don't Be A Menace (To The Galactic Senate While Raising Your Force Kid In The Hood)	May 14, 2024
545	"Mad Max Trilogy"	Jon Bailey	Hobocop	May 21, 2024
546	"X-Men '97"	Jon Bailey	To Me, My Childhood	May 28, 2024
547	"Civil War"	Jon Bailey	Coup There It Is	June 4, 2024
548	"Godzilla Minus One"	Jon Bailey	Maneater By The Sea	June 11, 2024
549	"Akira"	Jon Bailey	Every Frame A Painting	June 18, 2024
550	"Bridgerton"	Jon Bailey	Poundtown Abbey	June 25, 2024
551	"Beverly Hills Cop"	Jon Bailey	Trading Cases	July 2, 2024
552	"Furiosa: A Mad Max Saga"	Jon Bailey	Charlize Angels: Full Throttle	July 9, 2024
553	"Godzilla x Kong: The New Empire"	Jon Bailey	Super Smash B*stards	July 16, 2024
554	"The Wolverine"	Jon Bailey	Lōgun	July 23, 2024
555	"The Acolyte"	Jon Bailey	Sister Sithster	July 30, 2024
556	"Gymkata"	Jon Bailey	Gymkrapa	August 6, 2024
557	"House of the Dragon Season 2"	Jon Bailey	House of the Drags-on	August 13, 2024
558	"The Crow"	Jon Bailey	Caw Patrol	August 20, 2024
559	"Twisters"	Jon Bailey	Wind Breakers	August 27, 2024
560	"Beetlejuice"	Jon Bailey	Day-O the Dead	September 3, 2024
561	"Borderlands"	Jon Bailey	The Vault In Our Stars	September 10, 2024
562	"Inside Out 2"	Jon Bailey	Thrill & Dread's Bogus Journey	September 17, 2024
After the trailer, Bailey reads various quotes from James Earl Jones, who died on September 9th, 2024.
563	"The Iron Giant"	Jon Bailey	E.T. the Enormous Trashcan	September 24, 2024
564	"Whiplash"	Jon Bailey	Top Drum: Maverick	October 1, 2024
After the trailer, Bailey reads a quote from Minerva McGonagall in honor of Maggie Smith, who died on September 27th, 2024.
565	"Deadpool & Wolverine"	Jon Bailey	Cash In of the Christ	October 8, 2024
After the trailer, Bailey reads "And this may be the last time you hear the Boogie Song" from The Nightmare Before Christmas in honor of Oogie Boogie voice actor Ken Page, who died on September 30th, 2024.
566	"Beetlejuice Beetlejuice"	Jon Bailey	Death Comedy Jam	October 15, 2024
567	"Alien: Romulus"	Jon Bailey	Alien Similis	October 22, 2024
568	"The Wicker Man"	Jon Bailey	Weekend at Burnings	October 29, 2024
569	"Joker: Folie à Deux"	Jon Bailey	Arthur 2: Jokes on You	November 5, 2024
570	"The Wizard of Oz"	Jon Bailey	The Red Shoe Diaries	November 12, 2024
571	"Megalopolis"	Jon Bailey	Atlas Strugged	November 19, 2024
572	"The Penguin"	Jon Bailey	Horrible Bosses	November 26, 2024
573	"Kick-Ass"	Jon Bailey	The Dork Knight	December 3, 2024
574	"The Hobbit (1977)"	Jon Bailey	The SwiftlyEnding Story	December 10, 2024
575	"Venom: The Last Dance"	Jon Bailey	Spider-Man: No Face Shown	December 17, 2024
576	"Red One"	Jon Bailey	The Fast and the Festivus	December 24, 2024

=== 2025 ===
No.	Title	Narrator	Honest Title	Original release date
577	"Squid Game (Season 2)"	Jon Bailey	Mario Sharty	January 14, 2025
578	"Kraven the Hunter"	Jon Bailey	Lion Fellow's Safari Planet	January 21, 2025
579	"Sonic the Hedgehog 3"	Jon Bailey	Fast & Furry-ous: Tokyo Swift	January 28, 2025
After the trailer, Bailey reads "Juuuuust a bit outside!" in honor of Bob Uecker, who died on January 16, 2025.
580	"Gladiator II"	Jon Bailey	Roman Brawliday	February 4, 2025
581	"Captain America (1979) and Captain America II: Death Too Soon"	Jon Bailey	That 70's Bro	February 11, 2025
582	"Harry Potter and the Sorcerer's Stone"	Jon Bailey	When Harry Met Sorcery	February 18, 2025
N–A	"The Oscars (2025) (The Best Picture Nominees)"	Jon Bailey	Bauhaus Down; Pity Woman; New Pope Who Dis? I'm Still Not Here; Bob's Bangers; The Emperor's New Dune; A Broom of One's Own; Singcario; A Star Is Torn; POC POV 4K HD	February 25, 2025
A combined Honest Trailer for the ten 2025 Best Picture Oscar nominees.
583	"Daredevil"	Jon Bailey	Kitchen Nightmares	March 4, 2025
584	"Snowpiercer"	Jon Bailey	Snow Commotion	March 11, 2025
After the trailer, Bailey reads "Goodnight, sweet prince. Parting is... inevitable." from Superman IV: The Quest for Peace and "I'm so happy 'cause I'm a gummy bear!" from Robot Chicken in honor of Gene Hackman and Michelle Trachtenberg, who died on February 18 and February 26, 2025 respectively.
585	"Your Friendly Neighborhood Spider-Man"	Jon Bailey	Your Low Frame Rate Neighborhood Spider-Man	March 18, 2025
586	"The Electric State"	Jon Bailey	RoboFlop	March 25, 2025
587	"Teenage Mutant Ninja Turtles (1990)"	Jon Bailey	Ooze Your Own Adventure	April 1, 2025
588	"Severance"	Jon Bailey	9 to 5 to 9 to 5	April 8, 2025
After the trailer, Bailey reads "I'm your huckleberry!" in honor of Val Kilmer, who died on April 1, 2025.
589	"Tombstone"	Jon Bailey	When The West Was Fun	April 15, 2025
590	"Mystery Men"	Jon Bailey	The League Of Ordinary Gentlemen	April 22, 2025
After the trailer, Bailey reads "I've not to begin to defile myself" in honor of Val Kilmer, who died on April 1, 2025.
N–A	"Honest Teaser: The Fantastic Four: First Steps"	Jon Bailey	The Fantastic Four: Please Clap	April 25, 2025
Redubbed version of the official trailer.
591	"Captain America: Brave New World"	Jon Bailey	Marvel vs. D.C.	April 29, 2025
592	"Monty Python and the Holy Grail"	Jon Bailey	The Whitest Brits u' Know	May 6, 2025
593	"Final Destination"	Jon Bailey	1st of 5 Destinations And Counting...	May 13, 2025
594	"Snow White"	Jon Bailey	The Princess And The Slog	May 20, 2025
595	"A Minecraft Movie"	Jon Bailey	The Angry Pigs Movie	May 27, 2025
After the trailer, Bailey reads "NORM!" in honor of George Wendt, who died on May 20, 2025.
596	"Andor (Season 2)"	Jon Bailey	A Star Is Born	June 3, 2025
597	"Sinners"	Jon Bailey	I'm Gonna Bit You Sucka	June 10, 2025
After the trailer, Bailey reads a quote from John Redcorn in honor of Jonathan Joss, who died on June 1, 2025.
598	"28 Days Later and 28 Weeks Later"	Jon Bailey	Rabies Day Out	June 17, 2025
After the trailer, Bailey reads "Everybody is a star. One big circle goin' round and round." in honor of Sly Stone, who died on June 9, 2025.
599	"Drive"	Jon Bailey	Cars and the Real Girl	June 24, 2025
600	"Spaceballs"	Jon Bailey	The Princess Bribe	July 1, 2025
601	"Thunderbolts*"	Jon Bailey	MCU-icide Squad*; The Toxic Avengers	July 8, 2025
602	"The Naked Gun (2025)"	Jon Bailey	Son of a Gun; The Nude Rod; The Naked Gun	July 17, 2025
Promotional preview commissioned by Paramount.
603	"The Fantastic Four (1994)"	Jon Bailey	Four A Few Dollars Less	July 22, 2025
After the trailer, Bailey reads "Call Me Doom!" in honor of Julian McMahon, who died on July 2, 2025.
604	"Happy Gilmore"	Jon Bailey	Adam Driver	July 29, 2025
After the trailer, Bailey reads "Of all the things I've lost, I've miss my mind the most." in honor of Ozzy Osbourne, who died on July 22, 2025.
605	"Freaky Friday"	Jon Bailey	LiLo & B*tch	August 5, 2025
606	"KPop Demon Hunters"	Jon Bailey	Hey Sister Seoul Sister	August 12, 2025
607	"War of the Worlds (2025)"	Jon Bailey	Straight Outta Locations	August 19, 2025
608	"Jurassic World Rebirth"	Jon Bailey	Jurassic World: You Fell for It Again	August 26, 2025
609	"Superman (2025)"	Jon Bailey	No, More Mr. Nice Guy	September 2, 2025
After the trailer, Bailey reads "Kneel before Zod." in honor of Terence Stamp, who died on August 17, 2025.
610	"The Breakfast Club"	Jon Bailey	Freaks And Cliques	September 9, 2025
611	"Wednesday (Netflix S1 & S2)"	Jon Bailey	Death Because Her	September 16, 2025
612	"Weapons"	Jon Bailey	Hex-Men First Class	September 23, 2025
After the trailer, Bailey reads "You've gotta get Iron Man to stop by my niece's birthday party. Nost just a fly-by, he's gotta mingle." in honor of Robert Redford, who died on September 16, 2025.
613	"The Fantastic Four: First Steps"	Jon Bailey	The Atoms Family	September 30, 2025
614	"Tron: Legacy"	Jon Bailey	New TRON Bomb	October 7, 2025
615	"There Will Be Blood"	Jon Bailey	Monster's Ink	October 14, 2025
616	"The Thing"	Jon Bailey	Big Trouble in Little Outpost	October 21, 2025
After the trailer, Bailey reads "La dee, da, La dee da." in honor of Hollywood actress Diane Keaton, who died on October 11th, 2025.
617	"Freddy vs. Jason"	Jon Bailey	Super Slash Bros.	October 28, 2025
Zack Ward appears again as Scut Farkus. He then reads the comments as the character.
618	"Peacemaker"	Jon Bailey	Big Hero Dicks	November 4, 2025
619	"The Running Man (1987)"	Jon Bailey	Battle Royale with Cheese	November 11, 2025
620	"Wicked"	Jon Bailey	Hag School Musical	November 18, 2025
Tiah Giná, Emma Fyffe and Xander Jeanneret sing parodies of the film's songs as Elphaba, Glinda and Fiyero, respectively.
621	"Frankenstein (2025)"	Jon Bailey	Ego & Stitch	November 25, 2025
622	"Kill Bill Vol 1 & 2"	Jon Bailey	Bridezilla vs. Dong	December 2, 2025
623	"Stranger Things Season 5 (Part 1)"	Jon Bailey	Grown-Ups	December 9, 2025
624	"Anaconda (1997)"	Jon Bailey	Flesh Off The Boat	December 16, 2025
After the trailer, Bailey reads "Your soul is mine!" in honor of Japanese actor Cary-Hiroyuki Tagawa, who died on December 4, 2025, and then a moment of silence is held in honor of Rob Reiner and his wife, Michele Singer Reiner, who both died on December 14, 2025.
625	"Wake Up Dead Man: A Knives Out Mystery"	Jon Bailey	Holy Sh*t: A Tithes Out Mystery	December 30, 2025
After the trailer, Bailey reads "You can't handle the truth!" and "Sheen, do not push this button!" in honor of Rob Reiner and Jimmy Neutron voice actor Jeff Garcia, who died on December 14, 2025, and December 10, 2025 respectively.

=== 2026 ===
No.	Title	Narrator	Honest Title	Original release date
626	"The Lord of the Rings: The Fellowship of the Ring"	Jon Bailey	2001: A Chase Odyssey	January 13, 2026
627	"The Lord of the Rings: The Two Towers"	Jon Bailey	A Nightmare On Helm's Deep	January 20, 2026
628	"The Lord of the Rings: The Return of the King"	Jon Bailey	Adventurers Doomsday	January 27, 2026
629	"Stranger Things: The Final Episodes"	Jon Bailey	Honey, I Grew Up The Kids	February 3, 2026
630	"Heated Rivalry"	Jon Bailey	The Mighty Dicks	February 10, 2026
After the trailer, Bailey reads "Where is the Bebe's chamber?" in honor of Catherine O' Hara, who died on January 30, 2026.
631	"Zootopia 2"	Jon Bailey	Metaphoria 2: Ethnic Clawsing	February 17, 2026
After the trailer, Bailey reads "If I go crazy, then will you still call me Superman?" & "This wine is AW-FUL! Get me another glass!" in honor of Brad Arnold and Catherine O' Hara, who died on February 7, 2026 & January 30, 2026 respectively. Then, in honor of Pokémon's 30th anniversary, Bailey says: "Epic Voice Guy. I choose you!"
632	"Predator: Badlands"	Jon Bailey	To Catch a Predator	February 24, 2026
After the trailer, Bailey reads "You wouldn't last one day in the creek!" & "It ain't dying I'm talking about, it's living" in honor of James Van Der Beek & Robert Duvall, who died on February 11, 2026 & February 15, 2026 respectively.
633	"A Knight of the Seven Kingdoms"	Jon Bailey	So You Think You Can Lance?	March 3, 2026
After the trailer, Bailey reads "Ka-Chow!" in honor of Cars' 20th anniversary.
N–A	"The Oscars (2026) (The Best Picture Nominees)"	Jon Bailey	The Relevant; Stake n' Shake; Child's Play; One Bad Decision After Another; You're Not My Reel Dad; Bom, James Bom; Billing Two Nerds with One Stone; A Million Ways to Sigh in the West; Formula IC; To the Victor, Go the Toils	March 10, 2026
A combined Honest Trailer for the ten 2026 Best Picture Oscar nominees.
634	"Big Trouble in Little China"	Jon Bailey	Dunce Upon a Time in China	March 17, 2026
635	"One Piece Season 2"	Jon Bailey	Ahoy Story	March 24, 2026
After the trailer, Bailey reads various quotes from martial artist Chuck Norris, who died on March 19, 2026.
636	"Cast Away"	Jon Bailey	The Lonely Island	March 31, 2026
637	"Avatar: Fire & Ash"	Jon Bailey	Third Time's A Chum	April 7, 2026
638	"Who Framed Roger Rabbit"	Jon Bailey	Chinatoon	April 14, 2026
639	"The Spy Kids Trilogy"	Jon Bailey	Operation Jumbo Slop	April 21, 2026
640	"The Departed"	Jon Bailey	Rat Race	April 28, 2026
641	"Hoppers"	Jon Bailey	Beave It and Butt Heads	May 5, 2026
642	"A Knight's Tale"	Jon Bailey	Game Knight	May 12, 2026
After the trailer, Bailey reads "IT IS HIGH! IT IS FAR! IT. IS. GONE!" in honor of sportscaster John Sterling, who died on May 4, 2026.
643	"Project Hail Mary"	Jon Bailey	Pretty Great Movie. Statement.	May 19, 2026
644	"The Super Mario Galaxy Movie"	Jon Bailey	Project Hail Money	May 26, 2026
After the trailer, Bailey reads a quote from Professor Utonium in honor of voice actor Tom Kane, who died on May 18, 2026.
645	"The Boys S5"	Jon Bailey	Boys II Meh	June 2, 2026
After the trailer, Bailey reads "Smaller in number we are, but larger in mind." in honor of voice actor Tom Kane, who died on May 18, 2026.
646	"A.I. Artificial Intelligence"	Jon Bailey	Child Abandonment Simulator	June 9, 2026
647	"Mortal Kombat II"	Jon Bailey	Fight Klub	June 16, 2026
After the trailer, Bailey reads “Tea is soothing. I wish to be tense.” in honor of Anthony Head, who died on June 1, 2026.
648	"Supergirl (1984)"	Jon Bailey	Cheaper by the Cousin	June 23, 2026
649	"Idiocracy"	Jon Bailey	C*mming To America	June 30, 2026
After the trailer, Bailey reads “Ohana means family.” in honor of Daveigh Chase, who died on June 16, 2026.
650	"Obsession"	Jon Bailey	Grin And Bear It	July 7, 2026
651	"Troy"	Jon Bailey	You Can't Fight City Wall	July 14, 2026
652	"Backrooms"	Jon Bailey	Copied Pasta	July 21, 2026
After the trailer, Bailey reads “Hammond, after careful consideration, I've decided not to endorse your park.” in honor of Sam Neill, who died on July 13th, 2026.
653	"The Mandalorian and Grogu"	Jon Bailey	Lone Wolf And Slug	July 28, 2026
654	"Masters of the Universe (2026)"	Jon Bailey	Awesome Powers: Intergalactic Man of Mystery	August 4, 2026
655	"Avatar Aang: The Last Airbender"	Jon Bailey	Dragon Ball Breeze	August 11, 2026
656	"Supergirl (2026)"	Jon Bailey	Suns of Anarchy	August 18, 2026
657	"House of the Dragon Season 3"	Jon Bailey	Dragon Brawl III	August 25, 2026
After the trailer, Bailey reads various quotes from actress Hayden Panettiere, who died on August 16, 2026.
658	"Toy Story 5"	Jon Bailey	Antiques Roadshow	September 1, 2026
After the trailer, Bailey reads "Left side! Strong side!", "If you see someone without a smile, give 'em yours.", "Don't dream it, be it.", and "Do not grieve...soon I shall be one with the Matrix." in honor of Hayden Panettiere, who died on August 16, 2026, Dolly Parton, Tim Curry (both died on August 25, 2026), and Transformers voice actor Peter Cullen who died on August 26, 2026.
659	"The Prestige"	Jon Bailey	Tactical Magic	September 8, 2026
660	"The Runner"	Jon Bailey	The Foot Job	September 15, 2026
After the trailer, Bailey reads "We are gonna play Blue's Clues, because it's a really great game!" in honor of Blue's Clues' 30th anniversary.
661	"Ocean's Eleven"	Jon Bailey	Casino Morale	September 22, 2026
662	"Casino Royale"	Jon Bailey	The Texas Hold'Em Massacre	September 29, 2026
663	"Master and Commander: The Far Side of the World"	Jon Bailey	Napoleon Blown Apart	October 6, 2026
664	"Lanterns"	Jon Bailey	Hue Detective	October 13, 2026
665	"Spider-Man: Brand New Day"	Jon Bailey	The X-er Sis	October 20, 2026
After the trailer, Bailey reads "You can never use excuses because they always run out." in honor of RJ Mitte, who died on October 12, 2026.
666	"Training Day"	Jon Bailey	Hits from the Kong	October 27, 2026
After the trailer, Bailey reads "I have people skills! I am good at dealing with people!" in honor of Richard Riehle, who died on October 15th, 2026.
667	"Monsters, Inc."	Jon Bailey	Fear Factory	November 3, 2026
After the trailer, Bailey reads "Gosh, ain't I a stinker?" & "And that is what it is to be human. To make yourself more than you are." in honor of Eric Bauza and Patrick Stewart, who died on October 25th, 2026 & October 28th, 2026 respectively.
668	"Pan's Labyrinth"	Jon Bailey	The Maze Bummer	November 10, 2026
669	"Resident Evil (2026)"	Jon Bailey	Freaky's Delivery Service	November 17, 2026
