= Jordan Levin =

American media executive (born 1967)

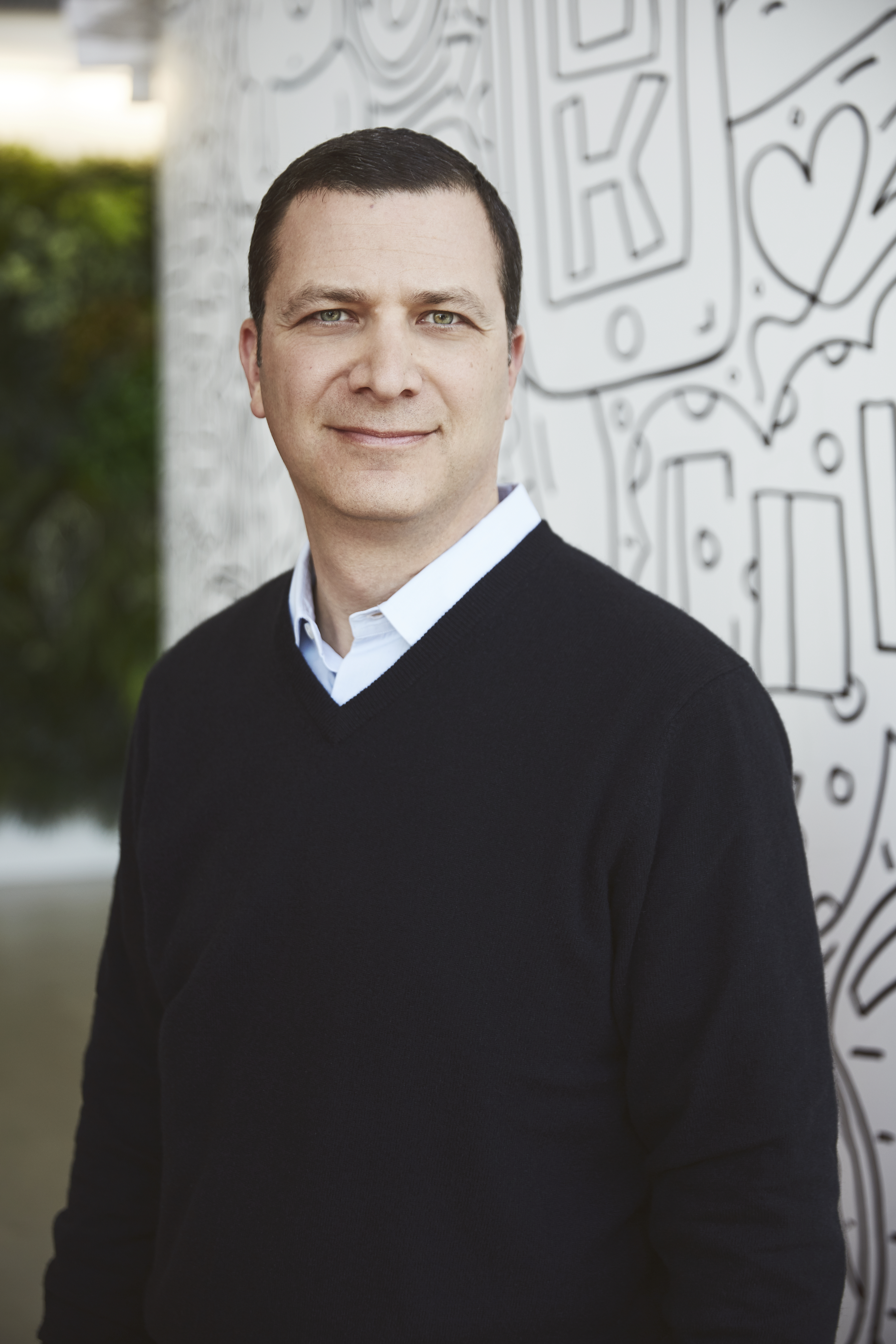
- Levin in 2017
- Born: August 30, 1967 (age 58)
- Occupations: Professor; media executive; producer; entrepreneur
- Years active: 1994–present
- Employers: University of Texas at Austin (2022–present); Rooster Teeth (2019–2024)

Jordan Levin (born August 30, 1967) is an American media executive, producer, entrepreneur and professor. He was general manager of Rooster Teeth, an Austin, Texas-based digital-media and events company owned by Warner Bros Discovery from 2019 until its closure in 2024. A strategic advisor and business consultant, he was previously the chief executive officer at AwesomenessTV, the chief content officer at the NFL, the CEO at The WB, and the founder and CEO of Generate, a production studio and talent management company. Levin is also a former co-owner of the Chicago Red Stars.

== Early life ==
Levin was born to a Jewish family. His father worked in advertising. As a child, Levin states that he would "take the old TV Guide Fall Preview issue and, just based on the descriptions, write whether I thought the shows would stick or not. So I always sort of fantasized about running a network." Levin attended the College of Communication at the University of Texas at Austin where he majored in Radio-Television-Film with a concentration in film and television theory and criticism.

He wrote his college thesis about how the increasing number of cable channels would force broadcast networks to be more targeted. This caught the eye of executives at the Walt Disney Company, who hired him as a training executive, which was the beginning of Levin's career in the entertainment industry.

== Career ==
Levin spent five years at Walt Disney Television where he worked on the creative team that developed and managed shows like Home Improvement, Ellen, and Boy Meets World.

In 1994, Levin joined The WB as part of its founding executive team. He oversaw the development of shows like Dawson's Creek, Buffy the Vampire Slayer, Felicity, One Tree Hill, Gilmore Girls, and Smallville. While at the WB, Levin worked with writers like J. J. Abrams, Joss Whedon, Ryan Murphy, and Greg Berlanti who wrote and executive produced their first television series. Levin became The WB's CEO at the age of 35, making him the youngest CEO in broadcast television history.

In 2005, Levin became the founding CEO of Generate, a production studio and talent management company. Generate focused on producing fictional and factual entertainment, branded content, and connecting advertising, technology and entertainment companies. In 2008, Levin secured $6 million in venture financing from MK Capital and Velocity Interactive Group. Three years later in 2011, Levin sold Generate to Alloy Digital, continuing on as Alloy Digital's president. In 2013, Alloy Digital merged with Break Media to form Defy Media.

In 2014, Levin joined Microsoft's Xbox Entertainment Studios as executive vice president, general manager to produce original programming. Levin left later that year when Xbox Entertainment Studios was closed due to shifting corporate priorities that came with Microsoft's change of corporate executive leadership.

In 2015, Levin became the chief content officer at the NFL. He oversaw the development, production, and distribution of video and editorial content for the NFL's media networks, including the NFL Network, NFL Digital Media, and NFL Films. He also managed the NFL's event programming franchises, such as the Super Bowl Halftime Show and NFL Honors. In 2016, Levin launched Good Morning Football, a live NFL morning television program, on the NFL Network. He won three Emmys, as the executive producer for All or Nothing, Sound FX: Super Bowl 50, and Hard Knocks.

In 2017, Levin was hired as the CEO of AwesomenessTV, an American media and entertainment company. As CEO, Levin oversaw the release of To All The Boys I've Loved Before on Netflix, which holds an approval rating of 96% on Rotten Tomatoes based on 48 reviews. In its 2018 Q3 earning report, Netflix noted that To All The Boys I’ve Loved Before was one of its most-viewed original films ever. In 2018, AwesomenessTV was sold to Viacom.

He was an adjunct professor at the University of Southern California, where he taught a class on the entertainment industry in the convergence age. In 2024 he transitioned into his current role as a full-time Professor of Practice in the Radio, Television and Film department at the Moody College of Communication at the University of Texas in Austin. Within that role, he currently teaches courses in sports broadcasting and storytelling, and is one of the professors involved in bringing to life the new sports production and broadcasting minor.

In addition, Levin is also a speaker, author, producer, and television director. In 2004, Levin directed an episode of Everwood. He is also a board member or advisor to several non-profit organizations, academic institutions, political advocacy groups, and early-stage media companies. He was named Moody College at the University of Texas at Austin’s Alumnus of the Year in 2002, was the University Alumni Organization’s 2004 Outstanding Young Texas-Ex Award recipient, selected as one of the University’s 125 Extraordinary Exes in 2010, and presented the Robert C. Jeffrey College Benefactor Award in 2018.
