= Deidre Behar =

American journalist

- Born: Deidre Behar; October 29, 1988 (age 37)
- Education: Loyola Marymount University (B.A.)
- Occupations: Producer and Host at Entertainment Tonight
- Known for: Entertainment Reporting
- Website: DeidreBehar.com

Deidre Behar (born October 29, 1988) is an American producer and host for Entertainment Tonight. In 2012, Behar joined Defy Media's Clevver Media as a host, producer and writer. She regularly appeared with Katie Krause. With Clevver, Behar created original programming, singular video news stories and daily entertainment shows. During this time, Clevver Media ranked in the top 10 YouTube networks. She has also produced content for Reelz.

Behar attended Loyola Marymount University (LMU) in Los Angeles, California. While at LMU, she was an anchor and a correspondent at the school. After college, Behar worked as an entertainment reporter for Fox.
