= Break.com =

Former entertainment and humor website

- Break.com’s Logo

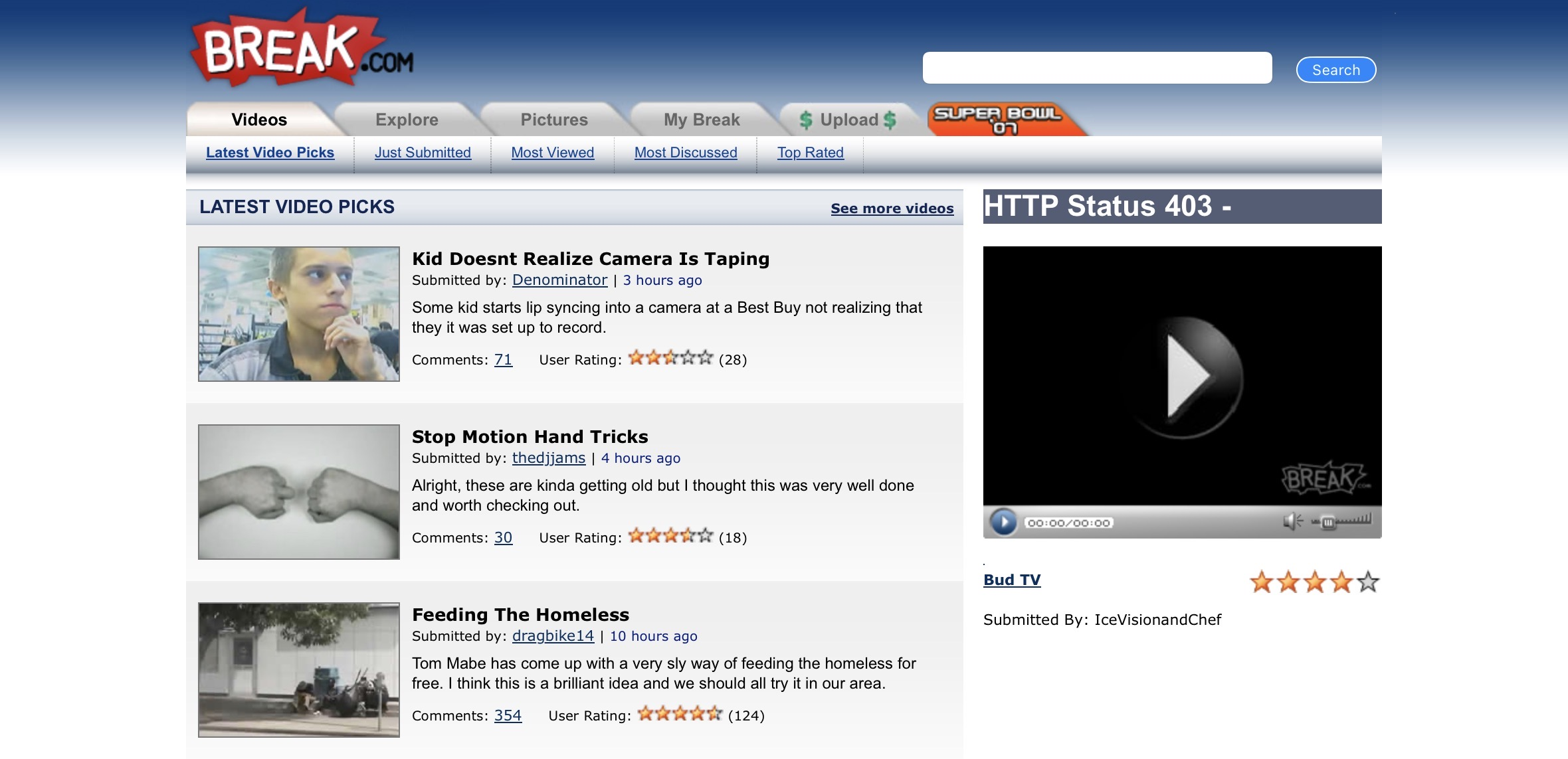
- The former homepage of Break.com (February, 2007)
- Founded: 1998 (Original) 2019 (Reboot)
- Dissolved: 2018 (Original) 2025 (Reboot)
- Headquarters: Los Angeles, California
- Owners: Break Media (1998–2013); Defy Media (2013–2018); Yeah1 Network (2019–2025)
- Founder: Keith Richman
- Website: break.com
- Commercial: Yes
- Registration: Optional
- Launched: 1998; 28 years ago (as Big-boys.com)
- Current status: Active as Break Casino

Break.com (formerly Big-boys.com) was an entertainment and humor website founded in 1998 that featured comedy videos, flash games, and pictures among other material. The website's target audience was men aged 18–35.

After shutting down on November 6, 2018 when Defy Media announced that it was ceasing operations, the site reopened several months later in April 2019 under ownership of the Vietnam-based Yeah1 network. By July 2026, Break.com had returned under the Break Casino name as an online casino website, with the site describing offerings including online slots, blackjack, roulette, baccarat, video poker and live-dealer casino games.

== History ==
Break.com was founded in 1998 as Big-boys.com, a humor website featuring comedy videos, flash games, and other material. At one time, visitors were able to rank site material on a scale of 1 to 5, but Break replaced that feature with a thumbs up or thumbs down system. Negative scores were not allowed on videos – a "thumb down" simply counteracted the vote of a "thumb up". Users could also comment on most of the individual entries. At the time of shutdown, all forms of visitor feedback and comments had been removed.

In January 2006, Break.com introduced a new file hosting system for its users to share their files. Shared files were able to be promoted to the homepage to be featured. Users that hosted original files promoted to the homepage were paid, but the user relinquished all rights to their material under contract. Break.com paid users for content ($400 for user-generated content and up to $2,000 for animated shorts) if the content yielded significant views.

In August 2006, Break.com and Showtime partnered to promote Weeds by encouraging Break.com users to upload original videos matching the themes of the show, with winners eligible for airing on the channel. Since then, advertising from various television shows and movies had appeared around the site, with similar video competitions occurring occasionally.

In March 2007, Break.com signed a contract with NBCU Digital Studios to develop a streaming broadband series to be featured on Break.com, tentatively titled Breakers. The show planned to involve attractive women finding different ways to break objects. Breaker's advertising revenue was planned to come from businesses paying to have their product smashed on the show, with Break.com's young-male demographic expected to attract the advertisers. Break.com CEO Keith Richman stated at the time, "We have a male audience that likes attractive women and demolition."

In April 2007, Break.com announced a deal with Fear Factor and Big Brother producer Endemol USA to create a new show called Record Breakers. That show was planned to center around contestants attempting to break obscure world records. Endemol chose Break.com for its ability to reach the young-male demographic. According to MediaWeek, the show was likely to carry pre-roll video advertisements and banner ads.

In July 2009, Break.com partnered up with G4's Web Soup for their "This Week In FAIL" segment.

In February 2010, Break.com purchased the PC game mod hosting network FileFront.com, which was previously owned by Ziff Davis Media.

In March 2018, Break.com disabled all comments, user uploads and user pages on their site, putting an end to any kind of user interaction or participation. Viewership plunged, and on November 6 of that year, parent company Defy Media announced that it was ceasing all operations.

The website had been owned by TMFT Enterprises, LLC., was sold to Yeah1 media group soon after and showed general entertainment content.

By June 2025, the server to the website began displaying a nginx message and later by September 2025, the site officially shut down and the domain was put up for sale.

== Break Casino ==
By July 2026, Break.com had been relaunched as Break Casino, an online casino. The website described Break Casino as offering online slots, blackjack, roulette, baccarat, video poker and live-dealer casino games.

== See also ==
- Metacafe
- Defy Media
- eBaum's World
- Video sharing
- YouTube
