= CagePotato =

Mixed martial arts websites

- CagePotato logo
- Company type: Sports media
- Website type: Mixed martial arts, Entertainment, News
- Available in: English
- Owner: Ian Shutts
- Creators: Ben Goldstein, Jonathan Small
- Website: www.cagepotato.com
- Commercial: Yes
- Registration: Optional (required for commenting and forum posting)
- Launched: 2007

Cagepotato was a news/entertainment website focusing on the sport of mixed martial arts (MMA). The site was owned by Defy Media and has relaunched in 2026.

== History ==
CagePotato.com was launched by former magazine editor Ben Goldstein and Break Media Editorial Director Jonathan Small in October 2007. Ben Fowlkes, who also contributes to SI.com and CBSSports.com joined the site as a co-editor in May 2008. Ben Fowlkes left CagePotato in April 2010 to join the writing staff at Vox Media owned MMAFighting.com, and was temporarily replaced by Mike Russell. The site is managed and edited by Jared Jones, with regular contributions from staff writers including Seth Falvo, Elias Cepeda, George Shunick, and Matt Saccaro.

CagePotato's MMA coverage includes exclusive fighter interviews, original videos, event liveblogs, photo galleries, and opinion columns. The site's editorial tone is marked by humor and cultural references, however topics dealing with legal developments in the field of mixed martial arts are also addressed.

As of December 2009, CagePotato attracted over 850,000 unique visitors per month and nearly 4,000,000 pageviews per month. The site and its content have been featured in Fight! Magazine, Inside MMA, G4’s Attack of the Show, Sirius Fight Club, RawVegas.TV, AskMen.com, Cage Radio, Yahoo! Sports, and other media outlets.

Guest columnists for CagePotato have included UFC fighters Gerald Harris , Efrain Escudero , Don Frye, Gary Goodridge, Dan Severn, Santino DeFranco , and adult film actress Carmen Valentina. In February 2010, CagePotato.com launched “MMA Fightpicker,” an MMA prediction game that allows players to compete against each other in weekly pools, predicting the outcomes of MMA events. However, due to financial concerns this game was discontinued.

CagePotato has had a rocky relationship with the UFC and its president, Dana White, since October 2010 when the website leaked photos from the Playboy pictorial of UFC Octagon girl Arianny Celeste. CagePotato has been barred from attending UFC media events since then. In April 2012, UFC attorney Donald J. Campbell issued a formal demand for a retraction over a satirical photo caption suggesting that Dana White wagered money on UFC fights.
