= Break Media =

Former digital media company

Break Media, LLC
- Company type: Private
- Industry: Digital Media
- Founded: 1998; 28 years ago
- Founder: Keith Richman
- Defunct: August 14, 2013; 12 years ago
- Fate: Merged with Alloy Digital
- Headquarters: Los Angeles, California, United States
- Area served: Worldwide
- Key people: Keith Richman (chairman & CEO)
- Services: Digital media Broadcasting programming
- Owner: Lionsgate
- Subsidiaries: Break.com; Screen Junkies; CagePotato; MadeMan; Chickipedia; HolyTaco; AllLeftTurns; TuVez; GameFront
- Website: breakmedia.com

Break Media was an American digital media company that owned several Internet properties targeted at men (males aged 18–34 make up 70% of their visitors), including Break.com (its first website), Screen Junkies, CagePotato, Chickipedia, HolyTaco, MadeMan, AllLeftTurns, TuVez and GameFront. It was founded in June 1998 by Keith Richman. From then until its eventual merger, the company's websites experienced significant growth. Traffic across all of its websites grew by 35% in 2009, with 27.9 million visitors in February 2010. The company's network of websites, many of which create original video content, made it the 11th most popular video network online in 2010. In October 2013, Break Media merged with Alloy Digital to create Defy Media.
