= GameFront =

Video game website

- Website type: Video games
- Owner: GameFront Ltd.
- Website: www.gamefront.com
- Commercial: Yes
- Registration: Not required
- Launched: 1998; 28 years ago
- Current status: Active

GameFront is a video game website that provides patches, demos, modifications, and other user-generated game-related content to users. In addition, the site provides editorial content around the modding community and the wider gaming industry. The site has a forum and an active Discord community.

In April 2016 the site closed. DBolical Pty Ltd. acquired GameFront from Defy Media, and relaunched the website in March 2018.

== History and ownership ==
On January 6, 2009, UGO Networks acquired 1UP.com. FileFront was not part of the purchase and became part of the PC Magazine Digital Network.

In March 2008, Ziff Davis Media entered chapter 11 bankruptcy protection. On March 26, 2009, Ziff Davis Media announced that FileFront site operations were to be indefinitely suspended on March 30, 2009. All of the Staff in Ziff Davis's FileFront division were made redundant at this time.

On February 11, 2010, Break Media acquired FileFront. In 2012, the site launched a spin-off series to Honest Trailers, Honest Game Trailers, that lasted only three episodes, before Smosh Games rebooted the series in 2014.

On April 14, 2016, GameFront announced that the site would be shutting down on April 30, 2016. In August 2016, DBolical Pty Ltd., owners of ModDB, acquired GameFront from Defy Media, and on March 11, 2018, officially relaunched the website with much of its original content alongside new features.

On August 1, 2021 it was announced that the website, assets and trademarks for GameFront.com were purchased from DBolical Pty Ltd. by GameFront Ltd. This new company is owned and run by long-time GameFront/FileFront members who have been running the site for a number of years under the prior ownership of DBolical Pty Ltd.
