= Defy Media =

American digital media company

Defy Media, LLC
- Formerly: Alloy Digital
- Type: Private
- Industry: Digital media
- Predecessors: Break Media; Alloy Digital
- Founded: October 2013; 12 years ago
- Defunct: November 6, 2018; 7 years ago
- Fate: Dissolved
- Headquarters: New York City, New York, U.S.
- Area served: Worldwide
- Key people: Matt Diamond
- Products: Digital media, merchandise, broadcasting, advertising media networks, apps
- Owners: ABS Capital Partners (36%); Lionsgate (19%); Viacom (7%); Wellington Management Company (38%)
- Number of employees: 400
- Subsidiaries: The Escapist; Smosh; Break.com; Shockwave.com; Clevver Entertainment
- Website: www.alloydigital.com

Defy Media, LLC was an American digital media company that produced original online content for the 12–34 age group. Originally founded in 1996 as Alloy Online (later Alloy Digital), the final company was formed in 2013 by its merger with Break Media.

On November 6, 2018, the company ceased operations after its assets were frozen by creditors, leaving channels like Smosh without a company. Several former employees blamed poor financial management, while high overhead from YouTube, legal troubles, overly aggressive expansion, and a shrinking advertising market were also described as contributing factors.

== History ==
=== 1996–2009: Alloy, Inc. ===
Alloy, Inc. (also known as Alloy Online) was founded in 1996 by James K. Johnson and Matthew Diamond as a holding company for Alloy, a teen-oriented magazine and website. By the time the company went public in May 1999 (its NASDAQ symbol was ALOY), the website earned $15.5 million in monthly revenue and 1.3 million registered users. In January 2000, they purchased book publisher 17th Street Productions, renaming it Alloy Entertainment.

Alloy's additional early assets included Delia's (acquired 2003, spun-off in 2005), CCS.com (acquired 2000, sold to Foot Locker in 2008), and Channel One News (acquired 2007, sold to Houghton Mifflin Harcourt in 2014).

=== 2009–2013: Alloy Digital ===
In 2009, Alloy created a division called Alloy Digital Networks to hold its online properties.

Alloy was then made private through acquisition by an investment group led by ZMC in 2010 and was re-incorporated as Alloy Digital in 2011. Within the next two years, Alloy Digital acquired Smosh, Themis Media (parent company of The Escapist and WarCry Network), Generate LA-NY, and Clevver Media. ZMC sold the Alloy Entertainment division to Warner Bros. Television in 2012.

=== 2013–2017: Merger and investment ===
In October 2013, Alloy Digital and Break Media merged to become Defy Media. The deal was brokered by RBC Capital Markets, and the resulting entity was owned in part by ZMC, ABS Capital Partners, and Lionsgate.

Viacom purchased a stake of Defy Media in 2014, in exchange for ownership of GameTrailers, Addicting Games, and Shockwave. In 2016, Defy settled a $70 million investment by Wellington Management Company, and ZMC exited from investment in 2017.

=== 2018: Decline and dissolution ===
In March 2018, Defy Media laid off 8% of its headcount, exiting its programmatic advertising and video licensing and syndication businesses. Joe Bereta, creative director of Smosh, left his position and was replaced by a former comedy partner, Luke Barats. In June, multiple publishers claimed that Defy had not paid them for advertising. One of those publishers, Topix, filed a lawsuit for $300,000.

In July, Defy sold The Escapist to Enthusiast Gaming, and Screen Junkies to Fandom.

In fall 2018, former CEO Matt Diamond, along with other employees, made multiple offers to the company's senior creditor, Ally Bank, to purchase the company. The bank ultimately rejected those offers, and on November 6, 2018, Defy Media announced that it was shutting down operations effective immediately and laying off all employees at its Beverly Hills production office. Less than a day after this announcement, the company's assets were frozen by creditors.

Former employees and executives blamed poor financial practices and unrealistic investments. An over-reliance on major social media platforms and changes in market space for new media were also described as contributing factors.

Smosh CEO Ian Hecox stated that he was looking to find a new outlet for the Smosh brand. On February 22, 2019, Mythical Entertainment acquired Smosh.

Defy Media's former head of audience development, Matthew "MatPat" Patrick, stated that the company stole 1.7 million dollars from him and other YouTubers. He claimed that the company was a Ponzi scheme and was using YouTube creators' money in order to look more attractive to outside investors.

== Content ==
Defy Media owned and operated online brands including Smosh, Shut Up! Cartoons, Smosh Games, Clevver Media, Break.com, The Escapist, AddictingGames.com, Gurl.com, MadeMan, CagePotato, The Warp Zone, and Chickipedia, with some brands being inherited from Break Media. Each of these brands operated a dedicated website and YouTube channel in or about comedy, filmed entertainment, news, video games, viral content, girl culture, men culture, or MMA. Defy Media's online program offerings included The Single Life, The Confession, Fashion on the Fly, Dating Rules, Chasing, Style Rules, Wendy, Style Setters, and The Sub.

According to Comscore, in 2012, Defy counted more than 38 million followers among its owned brands, reaching 221 million unique visitors each month. Together, its channels reached over 80 million video viewers monthly.

== Brands ==
Defy Media owned various brands including viral video site Break.com, MadeMan.com (a site for young men), flash game sites AddictingGames.com, Shockwave.com, DIY prop, cosplay channel Awe.Me, and Prank It FWD (Forward).

== Former sites and channels ==
Over the years, Defy Media shuttered numerous websites and channels, mostly underperforming ones left over from the Alloy Digital and Break Media merger that formed the company. Among these former sites include MMA website CagePotato, Chickipedia, HolyTaco, AllLeftTuns, and TuVez. Defy Media also sold off some brands to other companies.

=== The Game / Film Theorists / GTLive ===
MatthewPatrick13, later rebranded as "The Game Theorists" launched in August 22, 2009. Its founders are Matthew Patrick and Stephanie Patrick. They later launched The Film Theorists in May 12, 2014, and GTLive in August 26, 2015.

=== Shut Up! Cartoons ===
Shut Up! Cartoons was launched as a spin-off of Smosh in April 2012. It featured original cartoons and animated videos. The channel consistently ranked in the top 25 for weekly views. Original animated series featured on the channel included Zombies vs. Ninjas, Pubertina, Krogzilla, Oishi High School Battle, Smosh Babies, and Paper Cuts. The channel ceased operations on June 23, 2017.

=== Screen Junkies ===
The site focuses on film and television related topics. The group also includes Screen Junkies News, formerly ClevverMovies.

Screen Junkies is home for shows like Honest Trailers which is a series of parody trailers of films, The Screen Junkies Show which covers a variety of topics in film and television, and Movie Fights and TV Fights where cast debates various films or television shows.

On October 6, 2017, Andy Signore, the creator of The Screen Junkies Show, Honest Trailers, Movie Fights and TV Fights was suspended by Defy Media after accusations of sexual assault and sexual harassment made by female fans and coworkers became public. Several of the women also claimed that complaints made to Defy Media's HR department and management about the incidents had been suppressed or ignored by the company for several months until the women involved made the allegations public. Two days later, Screen Junkies announced on their Twitter page that Signore's employment was terminated effective immediately as "there is no justification for this egregious and intolerable behavior."

On July 2, 2018, it was announced that Defy Media sold Screen Junkies to Fandom.

=== The Escapist ===
The Escapist was acquired by Alloy Digital in November 2012. It targets video-game enthusiasts. In 2008, the site won a Webby Award and a People's Voice Award. The website generates 28 million page views each month. In 2012, The Escapist launched the Escapist Expo in Durham, North Carolina. The second annual took place in October 2013.

The website was part of the AddictingGames Network alongside flash game site AddictingGames.com until July 2018 when The Escapist was sold to Enthusiast Gaming, the owner of Destructoid in 2018.

=== Clevver Media ===
Clevver Media was founded in 2006 by Michael Palmer and Jorge Maldonado and acquired by Alloy Digital in June 2012. The millennial target platform operates six entertainment and celebrity-focused YouTube channels, including ClevverTV, ClevverMusic, ClevverNews, ClevverMovies, ClevverStyle, and ClevverTeVe. In 2012, Clevver Media ranked in the top 10 YouTube networks, according to Comscore. Joslyn Davis served as the executive producer. Hosts and producers have included Deidre Behar, Tatiana Carrier, Lily Marston, Erin Robinson, Katie Krause, Miriam Isa, Dana Ward, Misty Kingma, Drew Dorsey, and Sinead De Vries among others. The Clevver brand was the second-largest YouTube channel group for sponsor content in the Defy Media group of brands. Marston was the main editor in the beginning, and soon enough the company was hiring more employees to do various "behind the scenes" jobs. Employees Erin and Joslyn also appeared on the 28th season of The Amazing Race. The website also included channels Crushable, The Gloss, The Grindstone, Mommyish, and Blisstree, and was also part of the Clevver Network.

On February 15, 2019, Hearst Magazines announced that it has purchased Clevver Media.

=== Smosh ===
Smosh was founded in 2005 by Ian Hecox and Anthony Padilla and acquired by Alloy Digital in July 2011. The channel's core demographic is people ages 12–24. The Smosh website measures 1.5 million visitors monthly. With shows like Every [Blank] Ever, The Big What If, and its sketches, Smosh was called the Saturday Night Live of YouTube by Time in 2006. Smosh spin-off channels include Smosh Games, Smosh Pit, El Smosh, and the now defunct Shut Up! Cartoons.

Smosh Games was launched as a spin-off of Smosh and relaunch of ClevverGames in September 2012. Hecox and Padilla teamed up with various online gamers to play games, provide reviews and updates, and share commentary. The channel contains gameplay videos and a gaming variation of Screen Junkies' Honest Trailers called Honest Game Trailers. The YouTube channel achieved 1 million subscribers within three months of launching. It has gained more than 350 million video views.

On November 12, 2018, the Smosh cast released a video announcing that production of Smosh, Smosh Pit, and Smosh Games content was still ongoing, and that existing videos would be finished and other content would be continued to be released independently by Smosh on their YouTube channels. They subsequently joined Mythical Entertainment after their company was purchased by Rhett & Link.

Under Mythical, Smosh launched their first official podcast, SmoshCast, in February 2019. In 2020, Smosh Games began a heavy focus on live streaming via Twitch, launching shows like Board AF Live. In June 2023, Hecox and Padilla bought Smosh back from Mythical Entertainment. For the first time in over a decade, Smosh became an independent, creator-owned company. Along with the buyback, Padilla officially returned as a regular cast member and co-owner after being gone for six years.

=== Gurl.com ===
Gurl.com was created and launched in 1996 by Rebecca Odes, Esther Drill, and Heather McDonald as an online zine featuring alternative media that included advice on body positivity, female sexuality, and other concerns from female teenagers. In 2009, Alloy acquired Gurl.com, and they relaunched it in 2011 with a new logo. The website ceased activity after 2018 with the closure of Defy Media. In 2020, Jamie Petitto, who had been a video editor for Gurl.com from 2012 until its closure, alleged in a video post on her social media accounts that she had offered to buy Gurl.com from Defy Media but could not meet their demand of $3 million.

=== CagePotato ===
CagePotato was an news/entertainment focus about MMA. The site officially closed.

=== Break.com ===
Break.com was an entertainment and humor focused website aimed at the 18–35 aged male demographic. The website originally launched in 1998 and was acquired by Defy Media in 2013. It was shut down in 2018 following Defy Media's closure. Rights to the website were bought by Yeah1 Network and the website was relaunched in 2019, but has since become defunct.
