= Screen Junkies =

Online movie magazine and YouTube channel

YouTube information
- Channel: Screen Junkies
- Years active: 2011–present
- Genres: Comedy; humor; parody
- Subscribers: 6.77 million
- Views: 2.72 billion
- Last updated: December 2021
- Website: www.screenjunkies.com

Screen Junkies is an online movie magazine and YouTube channel, owned and operated by Fandom, that focuses primarily on movies and television. Screen Junkies produce numerous shows now spread across two YouTube channels, including The Screen Junkies Show (hosted by Hal Rudnick; discussions and programs about the entertainment industry and films, and the occasional press junket), Movie Fights! (a competition series that is currently usually hosted by Hal Rudnick and features players from the channel and across the web; debates about film, TV, and the industry), Honest Trailers (a series of comedic trailers, narrated previously by Ptolemy Slocum and Gannon Nickell and currently by Jon Bailey; satires of various films and television programs), Honest Trailer Commentary (a behind-the-scenes look at Honest Trailers with deleted footage and explanations by the program's creators, now usually some combination of Spencer J. Gilbert, Danielle Radford, and Lon Harris), Screen Junkies Universe (SJU) (featuring guests from the channel and across the web; discussions about industry news, the media, and fan questions), Movie Reviews, CRAM IT (a series to catch viewers up on popular franchises), and others.

On October 21, 2016, the ClevverMovies channel announced that it would be rebranding into Screen Junkies News on November 1, 2016. Roth Cornet was chosen to serve as editor-in-chief. Screen Junkies News focuses primarily on news-related programming, but also includes non news-related programs like answering fan questions at least once a week. On July 2, 2018, it was announced Defy Media sold ScreenJunkies to Fandom, a site similarly focused on hard-core entertainment buffs. On April 15, 2019, the Screen Junkies News channel was renamed "Fandom Entertainment." Most of its programming, including the flagship show, Screen Junkies Universe (SJU), remains unchanged.

As of April 2021, Screen Junkies has over 6.75 million subscribers and over 2.6 billion video views over its two channels.

== Videos ==
=== Series ===
Title	Host(s)	Live/Taped	Channel
Current series
Watch This!	Various	Taped	Fandom Entertainment
Fandom IRL	Various	Taped	Fandom Entertainment
Certain POV	Various	Taped	Fandom Entertainment
Screen Junkies Universe	Roth Cornet (with Spencer Gilbert, Joe Starr, Danielle Radford, and/or Various)	Live	Fandom Entertainment
Honest Trailers	Voiced by Jon Bailey	Taped	Screen Junkies
Honest Trailer Commentaries	Spencer Gilbert, Joe Starr, Danielle Radford, Lon Harris, and/or Various	Taped	Fandom Entertainment
Movie Fights	Hal Rudnick (with Lon Harris and Danielle Radford)	Taped	Screen Junkies
Movie Reviews	Roth Cornet and/or Various	Taped	Fandom Entertainment
Cram It!	Various	Taped	Screen Junkies
Former series
The Screen Junkies Show	Hal Rudnick	Taped	Screen Junkies
Charting with Dan	Dan Murrell (with Roth Cornet or Lon Harris)	Taped	Fandom Entertainment
Smash Hit!	Various	Taped	Fandom Entertainment
Cast Away	Joe Starr (with various)	Taped	Fandom Entertainment
Other Special Featurettes	Various	Taped	Fandom Entertainment
Serious Questions	Various	Taped	Screen Junkies
Could Have Been Worse	Joe Starr	Taped	Fandom Entertainment
Background Extras who Ruined Movies	Billy Business, Joe Starr, Danielle Radford, Ed Greer	Taped	Fandom Entertainment
TV Fights	Roxy Striar (Billy A. Patterson as Fact Checker)	Live	Fandom Entertainment
Millennial Falcon	Jenny Nicholson	Taped	Screen Junkies
Flick Bait	Spencer Gilbert, Joe Starr, Dan Murrell	Live	Screen Junkies
Knocking Dead	Hector Navarro	Live	
Honest Game Trailers Commentaries	Matt Raub and/or Spencer Gilbert	Pre-Taped	
Flash and Friends	Joe Starr, Roxy Striar, and Jason Mewes	Live	
What's in the Box?	Kevin Smith and Jason Mewes	Pre-Taped	
Pitch Off	Doug Benson	Pre-Taped	
After The Fight		Live	
Debugging Mr. Robot	Rob Cesternino, Spencer Gilbert, and Clarke Wolfe	Live	
Movie Games	Jeremy Jahns	Pre-Taped	
Does it Hold Up?	Spencer Gilbert	Pre-Taped	
Movie VS Movie	John Flickinger	Pre-Taped	
After Credits	The How It Should Have Ended (HISHE) crew	Pre-Taped	
Screen Junkies Roasts	N/A	Pre-Taped	
Mundy Night Raw	Nick Mundy, Michael Truly (with Spencer Gilbert on bass)	Live	
Mega Movie Get-Together	Andre Meadows	Live	
Interns of F.I.E.L.D.	Dan Murrell, Spencer Gilbert (created by)	Pre-Taped	
Summer Movie Report	Dan Murrell and Sasha Perl-Raver	Live	
ScreenJunkies Movie Review	Dan Murrell	Pre-Taped	
F1rst and Worst	Chris Stuckmann	Pre-Taped	
Dan's Labyrinth	Dan Murrell	Live	
Gamer Fights	Matt Raub (Nikole Z as Fact Checker (Kristen Brancaccio for live episodes))	Live	
Watching Thrones	Spencer Gilbert, Michele Boyd, Roth Cornet, Lon Harris	Live	Fandom Entertainment

=== Honest Trailers ===
Honest Trailers is a web series of parody trailers of films and television series that are made to satirize them. The videos are narrated by Jon Bailey.

Originally co-created by Andy Signore and Brett Weiner, and shepherded by Break Media's Head of Programming Mitch Rotter, Honest Trailers debuted in February 2012 and by June 2014 had become the source of over 300 million views on the Screen Junkies YouTube channel. The series started when the creators saw that Star Wars: Episode I – The Phantom Menace was being re-released in 3D and decided to make a parody trailer for it, continuing the series as a result of the positive reception the videos received. The series received Primetime Emmy Award nominations for Outstanding Short Form Variety Series at the 68th, 69th, 70th, and 71st Primetime Creative Arts Emmy Awards.

The series' videos take approximately one week to assemble, and used to be created by around four people. The creators watch the movie a number of times before writing the script as a group. Subjects are chosen by a combination of current popular movies and suggestions from viewers, with an aim of making the videos go viral. Though some would like to cover more television shows, they haven't done many due to the increased time commitment as the team have to watch every episode of the series versus a film.

As of August 2019, the series has skewered the following TV series: Star Trek: The Next Generation, Doctor Who ("Classic" & "Modern"), The Walking Dead (in 2 volumes), Game of Thrones (in 3 volumes), Entourage, Marvel's Agents of S.H.I.E.L.D. (up to halfway through season 3), X-Men: The Animated Series, The Flash (up to season 3), Sherlock, Friends, and The Last of Us. The series has also done "mini-trailers" for the 2016 Primetime Emmys, and a parody trailer of the 1964 TV movie Rudolph the Red-Nosed Reindeer.

The series was first narrated by comedian Ptolemy Slocum who narrated only the first video. The next dozen were narrated by Gannon Nickell (with the exception of the one for Avatar, which was narrated by Dough Medlock), before he enlisted in the military and Jon Bailey replaced him. Despite starting as a direct copy of typical movie trailer voiceovers, Bailey's narration voice has become more of a parody over time, using different styles for the various genres satirized.

In May 2016, Ryan Reynolds co-narrated the Honest Trailer for Deadpool in character as the film's titular character, who is known for breaking the fourth wall. Reynolds reprised his role as Deadpool for the Honest Trailer for Logan, the series' 200th video, and the Honest Trailer for Deadpool 2.

The series' creators often bring in external help for particularly complex shows, like the cross-over episode of Spider-Man: Into the Spider-Verse, and the musical episodes of Moana, Frozen, Mary Poppins, The Greatest Showman, The Lion King (feat. AVbyte) (1994), Aladdin (1992), The Little Mermaid (feat. AVbyte) (1989), Les Miserables (2012), Beauty and the Beast (1991), Willy Wonka & the Chocolate Factory (feat. Michael Bolton), A Star is Born (2018), and La La Land (shared with Moonlight).

The series' 100th video, for Fifty Shades of Grey, was released in May 2015, the 200th, for Logan (feat. Deadpool), was released on May 23, 2017, and the 300th, for the MCU (pre-Endgame), was released on June 18, 2019. As of August 2019, the Honest Trailer for Titanic is the most viewed at over 41.5 million views, with Game of Thrones Vol. 1 slightly behind at just under 42.3 million.

Not all videos speak negatively about their films. For the 2014 superhero film Captain America: The Winter Soldier, contrary to typical style, the creators found it difficult to raise negative points and conceded that the film was good. As the show's writers often say, they have to be honest, not necessarily critical. Co-director Joe Russo said that he had the series in mind when creating the film, and aimed to make the movie "Honest Trailer-proof".

The head writer of Honest Trailers is Spencer J. Gilbert, who also appears on Movie Fights. Other writers include Dan Murrell (which ultimately left after the Honest Trailer for Cats), Joe Starr, Danielle Radford, and Lon Harris.

A spin-off of Honest Trailers focused on video games, Honest Game Trailers, was also created, originally by GameFront (at that time, also owned by Break Media), then rebooted in partnership with the Smosh Games YouTube channel (at the time, also owned by Defy Media), before relocating to the Fandom Games channel upon Screen Junkies' acquisition by Fandom. Honest Game Trailers was initially narrated on GameFront by James Heaney, then also narrated by Jon Bailey when it moved to Smosh Games, before being replaced by Brad Venable, only for Bailey to return to the series after Venable's death in 2021.

=== The Screen Junkies Show ===
The Screen Junkies Show covers a variety of topics in film and television. Some episodes include interviews with actors, "supercuts" (compilations), and information and updates on movies. The Screen Junkies Show is hosted by Hal Rudnick.

=== Movie Fights ===
"Movie Fights", typically hosted by Rudnick (originally Andy Signore), features debates between three other people within or outside of Screen Junkies, such as other YouTube reviewers, on various movie-related questions. This segment lasts for about an hour and a half, with the first five rounds being a roundtable debate, and the last round being a "Speed Round". Each round would begin with a question, and each contestant would have to make an argument for why their answer is best. The speed round consists of five questions, and each contestant has fifteen seconds to make a claim for their answer and ten seconds to give their rebuttal against their opponent. When a contestant wins a round or speed run question, they win a point and the person who finishes the game with the most points wins. In the match titled "Ultimate Game of Thrones Spin-off Movie?" posted on April 12, 2015, Murrell became the first ever Movie Fights Champion after winning the first ever title bout, a position held until July 13, 2017, when he lost a "Showstopper" competition to Spencer Gilbert immediately after retaining the Belt in a tournament fight. To become the next Movie Fights champion, a contestant is required either to defeat the current champion in a title bout match which occurs if the current champion wishes to "put the belt on the line", or win the special "Last Man Standing" fight where multiple contestants fight in a knock out format to win the "Showstopper", a box with 5 speed round questions, so that the contestant can challenge the current champion to a speed round match using the speed round questions found inside the "Showstopper".

Movie Fights returned on December 14, 2017, with a new format and Hal Rudnick hosting. The new format had two fighters instead of three and three judges instead of one. On March 29, the three fighter format returned, but the three judges remain.

=== Screen Junkies Plus ===
During the 56th episode of Movie Fights, which aired on November 18, 2015, new premium shows were announced to be available through screenjunkies.com or an app for a monthly fee of $4.99 with a free 3-month trial and other package options. Upon its initial release, more than ten original shows were available through Screen Junkies Plus, including Interns of F.I.E.L.D., their first scripted series.

In addition, their YouTube shows, including the Screen Junkies Show and Honest Trailers, are available through the platform, with each episode of Movie Fights also streaming live each Thursday before its Saturday YouTube release. Several cast members, notably Alicia Malone and new producer Ken Napzok, had previously worked for the Schmoes Know network, Napzok as a producer and Malone as a presenter, as the Schmoes and the Screen Junkies often work together, with numerous members of the Schmoes Know team appear on Movie Fights.

On the February 3, 2016 episode of Screen Junkies Universe, Hector Navarro was announced as the host of a new show Knocking Dead (start date Monday, February 8, 2016), which would have more of a balance of praise and criticism for the TV show "Walking Dead" than the show has been given thus far. The show focused on the second half of season 6. This slot was later used in April through June for the show Watching Thrones, a commentary on "Game of Thrones" season 6, hosted by Ken Napzok, Michele Boyd, and Spencer Gilbert and a rotating guest host, with Trisha Hershberger later becoming a regular. Starting July 7 (Thursday), a similar style show was introduced critiquing the second season of USA's "Mr. Robot" (Debugging Mr. Robot).

On the April 25, 2016 episode of Mundy Night Raw, Dan Murrell announced that a hiatus after the episode, and that he would begin a show of his own in which he'd review films. Summer Movie Report with co-host Sasha Perl-Raver debuted on May 9. Following the conclusion of Summer Movie Report, it was announced Dan would host a new movie review show called Dan's Labyrinth, which premiered on November 7.

On the 86th episode of Movie Fights (YouTube airdate June 4, 2016), it was announced that winner Matt Raub would be hosting a new weekly show Gamer Fights, which premiered on Friday, June 17. The show is created in collaboration with Smosh Games, and once a month, an episode will be available through the Smosh Games website. The first six episodes were pre-recorded. Additionally, Honest Game Trailers would be aired on Screen Junkies Plus along with Honest Game Trailers Commentaries.

In addition to their original series, Screen Junkies Plus also featured occasional special content, including Extended Editions of their Honest Trailers, a 2015 holiday special, and a Movie Fights second anniversary retrospective special.

On July 5, 2017, during Screen Junkies Universe, it was announced that the service will be going free with shows airing on YouTube spread over their two channels. Content will still be uploaded to their website until August 5, 2017.

Production of all of the Screen Junkies Plus shows halted in late 2017, and in April, 2018, screenjunkies.com was removed.

=== Millennial Falcon ===
On 19 September 2016 Screen Junkies announced that Roth Cornet would lead an open search for a new presenter. YouTuber Jenny Nicholson was chosen to present Millennial Falcon, 'a deep dive into the Star Wars universe, all things Disney, breaking news, and all of the geeky minutia in between'. The first episode appeared on 8 April 2017 on Screen Junkies News. The show moved to Screen Junkies on 16 July 2017.

== Reception ==
As of April 2021, Screen Junkies has over 6.75 million subscribers and over two billion video views. In 2014 the Screen Junkies YouTube Channel was listed on New Media Rockstars Top 100 Channels, ranked at #34. In 2015, the series writers Spencer Gilbert, Dan Murrell, and Erica Russell were nominated at the 5th Streamy Awards. Between 2015 and 2018 Honest Trailers has secured nominations in numerous Streamy categories, winning in "Writing" in 2016 and in "Collaboration" with Ryan Reynolds in 2017. The series was nominated for a Creative Arts Emmy Award for Outstanding Short Form Variety Series in 2016, 2017, 2018 and 2019. Several creators positively reacted to the Honest Trailers of their movies:

- Zack Stentz, co-writer of Thor and X-Men: First Class, initially called the channel's "Honest Trailers" feature "insufferable". After the channel's staff contacted Stentz, he agreed to watch the "Honest Trailer" for Thor with them, and conceded on some of the points that were brought up, claiming he initially confused them with a similar YouTube channel, implied to be CinemaSins. He later appeared on the first episode of "Summer Movie Report" and the 83rd episode of Movie Fights.
- The Russo brothers have declared themselves fans of the "Honest Trailer" series, and stated that during production of Captain America: The Winter Soldier they aimed to make that film's script "Honest Trailer-proof", finding the series a litmus test on film logic, and explaining how the choices came to be during the development process.
- Chad Stahelski and David Leitch likewise stated that they enjoy the series and have kept it in mind during the production of John Wick and its sequel.
- During the production of Deadpool, the crew at one point considered making the Honest Trailer version of their own movie for the closing credits. While the idea ultimately did not come to pass, Ryan Reynolds reprised his role as Deadpool in the Honest Trailers for Deadpool, Logan and Deadpool 2. In the latter he turned the premise on its head, instead narrating an Honest Trailer for Honest Trailers in character as Deadpool. The first film director Tim Miller, Deadpool creator Rob Liefeld and Colossus actor Stefan Kapičić also approved of the choices made for the Honest Trailer.
- The Lion King director Rob Minkoff called Honest Trailers amazing, adding that he preferred them to the regular movie trailers.
- Kong: Skull Island director Jordan Vogt-Roberts appeared in the Honest Trailer for his movie and helped write it, listing what he believed were legitimate faults in his own film, in contrast to the video CinemaSins made on the film.
- Ant-Man director Peyton Reed stated that he found the series very funny, and explained that the similarities between the first Ant-Man film and the first Iron Man movie brought up in the Honest Trailer stemmed from the film's lengthy development process. Both movies were originally written around the same time, before their shared elements became clichés, and, by the time Reed came on board years later, became integral parts of the script that could not be changed without altering the whole story.
- Various creators of X-Men: The Animated Series reacted positively to the Honest Trailer of their show.

== See also ==
- How It Should Have Ended (HISHE)
- Cinema Sins
