= 5th Streamy Awards =

2015 awards ceremony recognizing online video

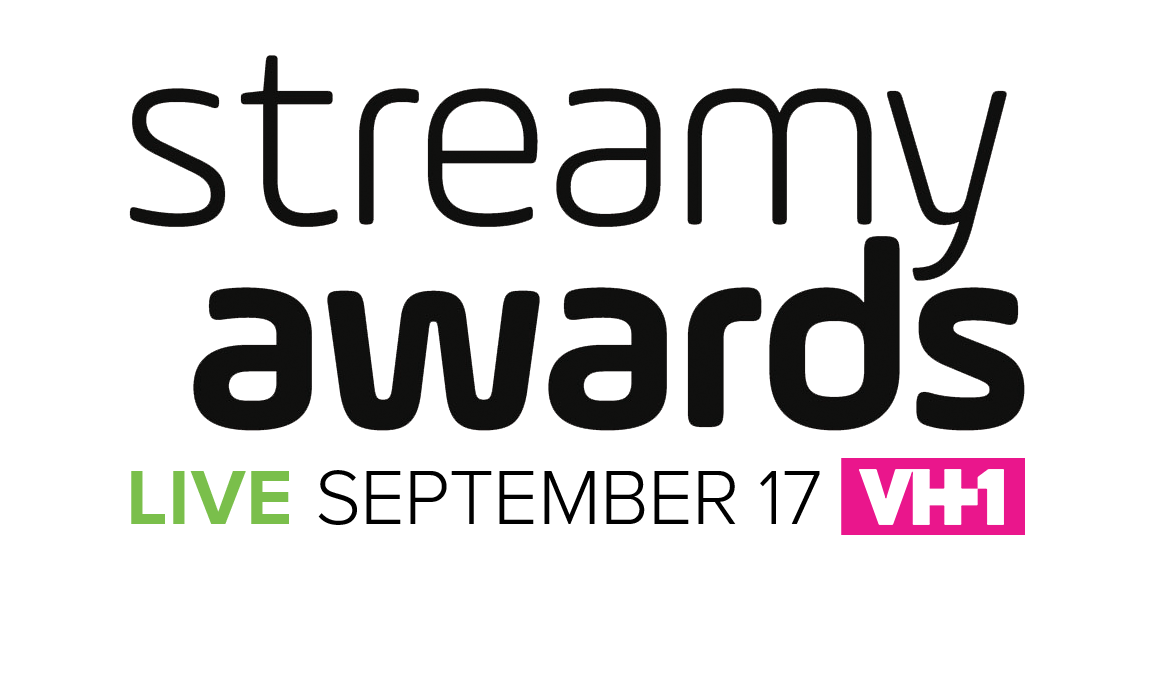
- Date: September 17, 2015
- Location: Hollywood Palladium; Hollywood, California
- Presented by: Streamys Blue Ribbon Panel
- Hosted by: Grace Helbig and Tyler Oakley

Highlights
- Most wins: Epic Rap Battles of History (3)
- Most nominations: SnapperHero (6)
- Audience Choice: FouseyTUBE (Show of the Year); Cameron Dallas (Entertainer of the Year)

Television/radio coverage
- Network: VH1 (US); YouTube (online)
- Runtime: 1 hour, 30 minutes
- Produced by: Dick Clark Productions; Tubefilter

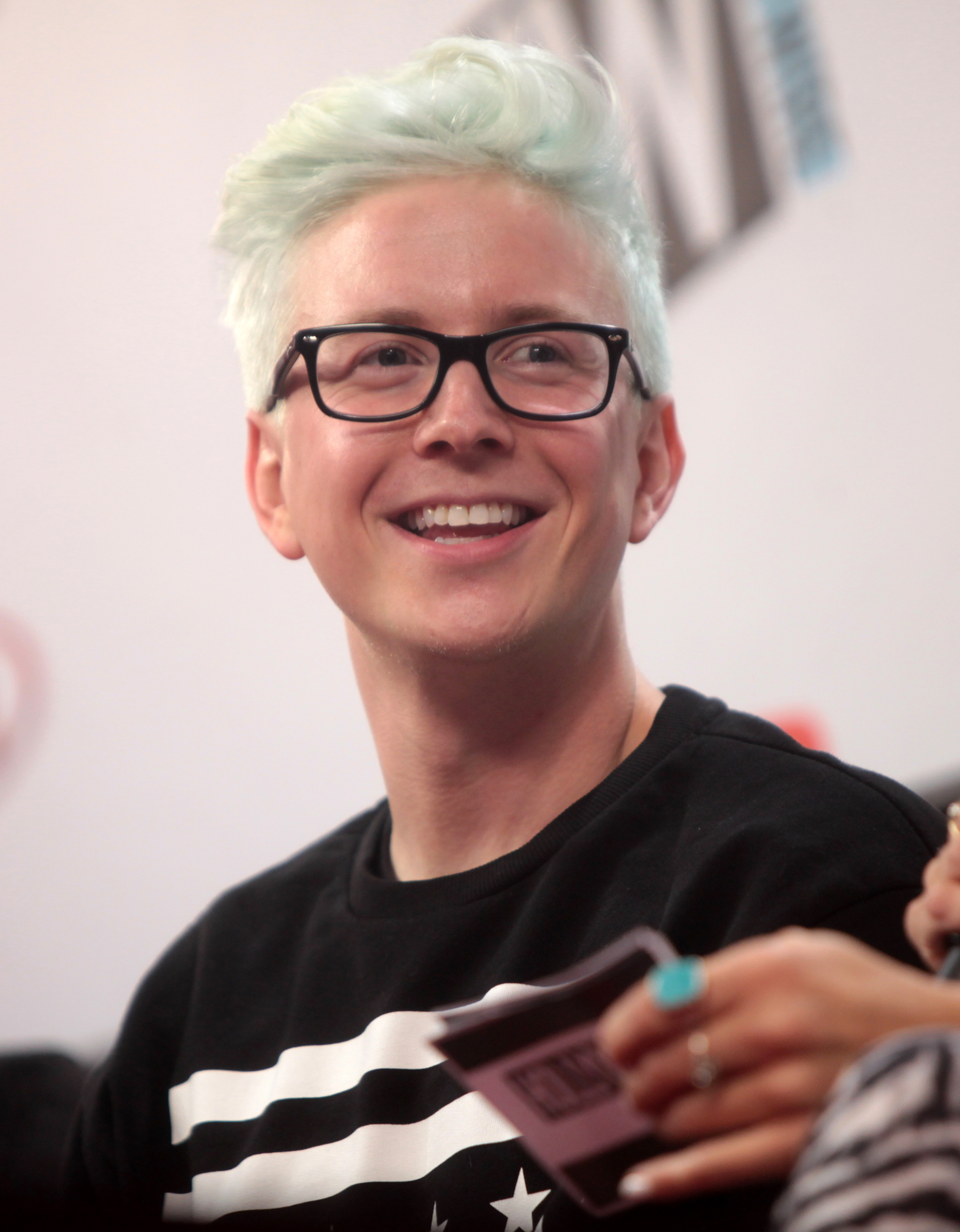
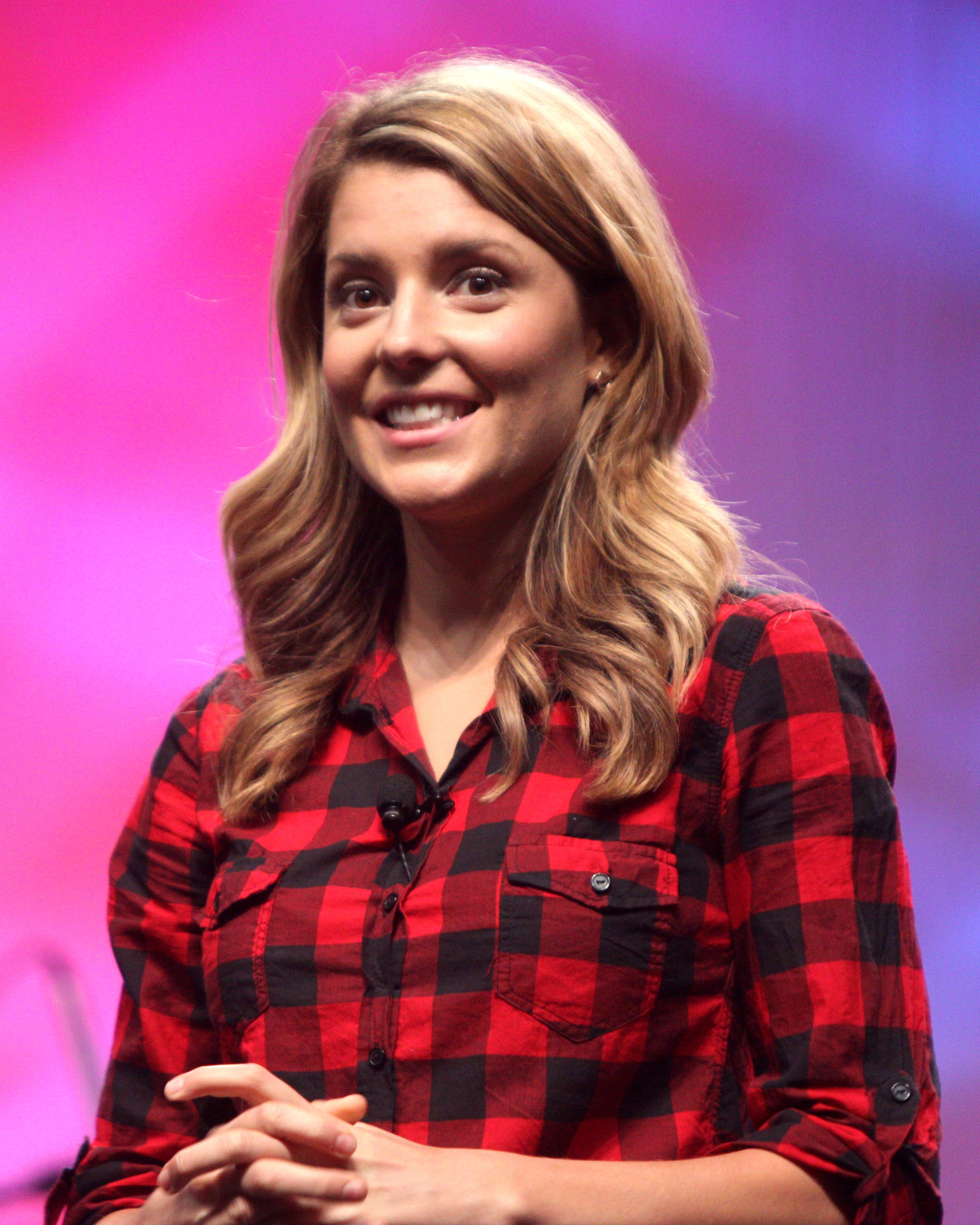
Tyler Oakley and Grace Helbig hosted the show

The 5th Annual Streamy Awards was the 5th installment of the Streamy Awards honoring streaming television series. The awards were held on September 17, 2015, at the Hollywood Palladium in Hollywood, California. They were hosted by the YouTube stars Grace Helbig and Tyler Oakley. Broadcast live on VH1 and simultaneously livestreamed online, the 5th Streamy Awards were the first to be televised. Several new award categories were added for the 5th Streamys, including new Social Video awards for content on Instagram, Snapchat, and Vine, new subject categories such as Lifestyle and Documentary or Investigative, and Breakout Creator and Breakthrough Artist which were created to celebrate up-and-coming creators. The show had a positive reception in media publications and on social media.

== Performers ==
The 5th Annual Streamy Awards featured the musical performances of the following artists:

Performers at the 5th Streamy Awards
Artist(s)	Song(s)
A Great Big World (featuring Futuristic)	"Hold Each Other"
Alessia Cara	"Here"
Future	"March Madness"
OMI	"Cheerleader"
Sir Mix-A-Lot	"Baby Got Back"
Hailee Steinfeld	"Love Myself"

== Winners and nominees ==
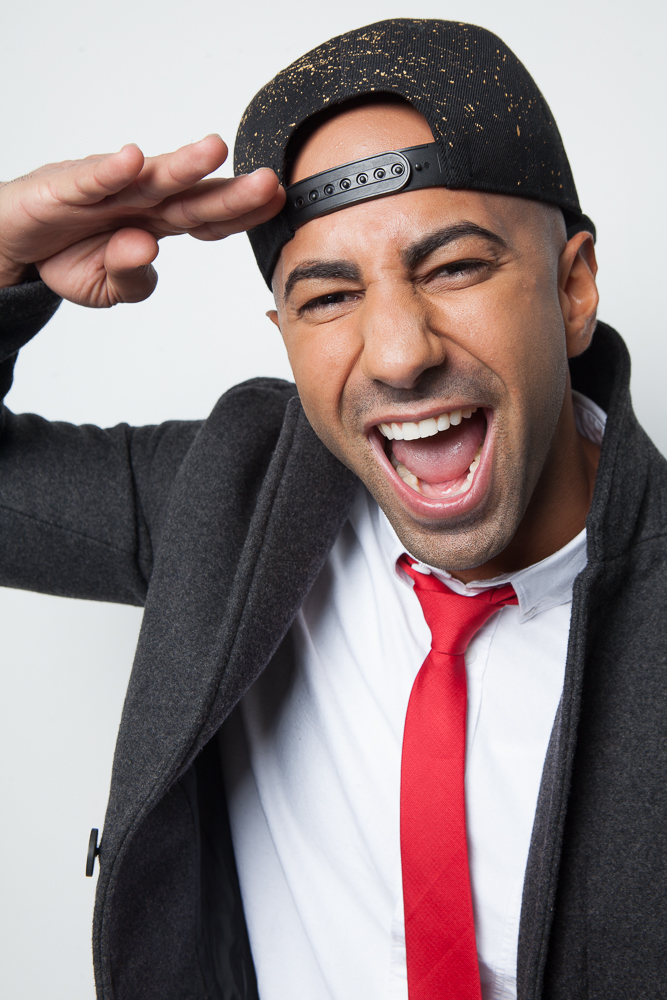
Yousef Erakat, winner of the Audience Choice Award for Show of the Year

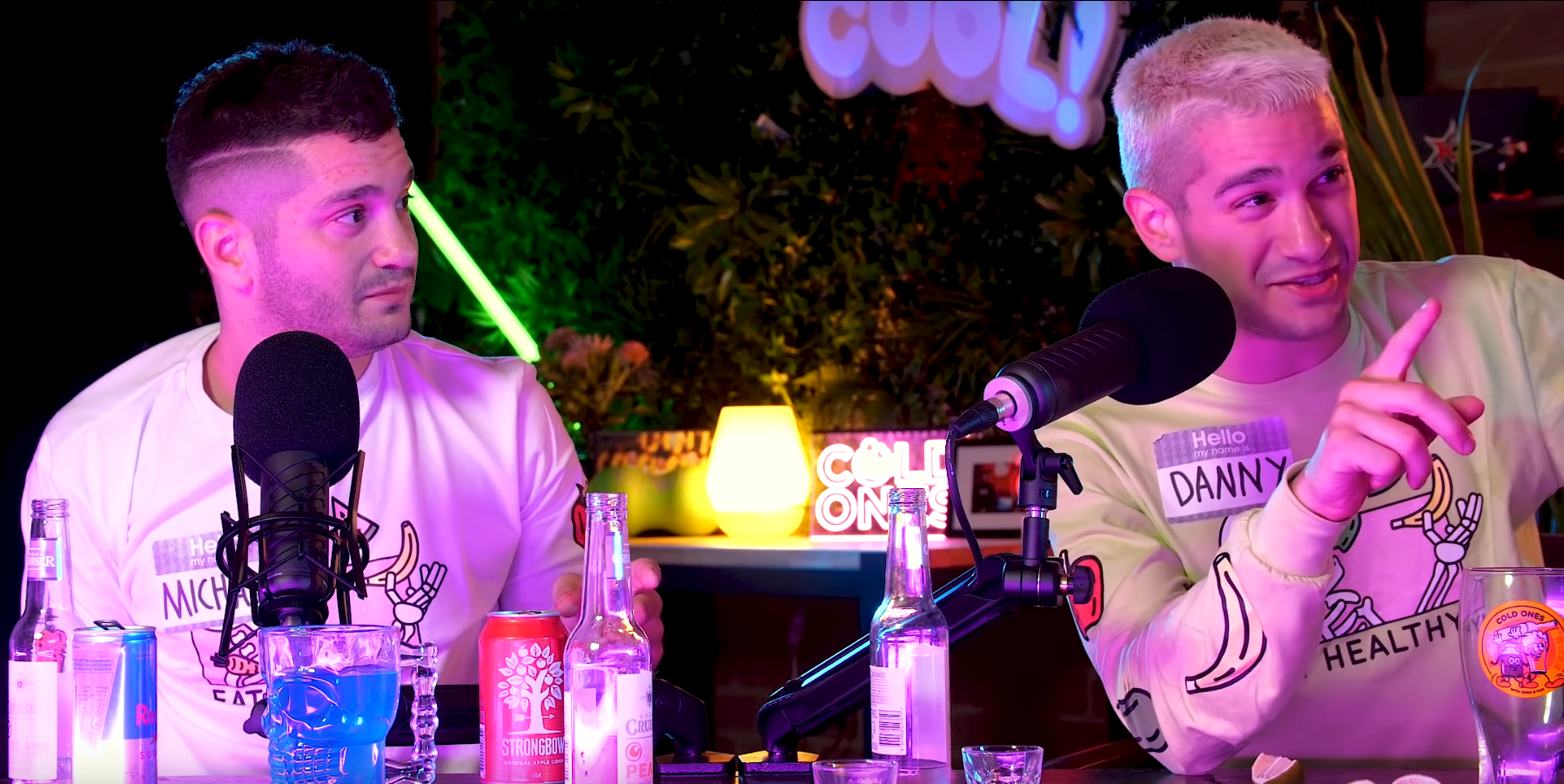
RackaRacka, winners of the International category

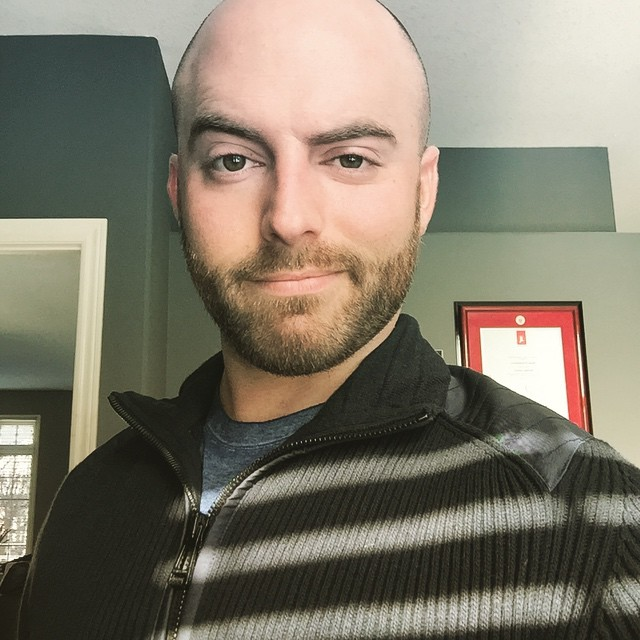
Matthew Santoro, winner of the Breakout Creator award

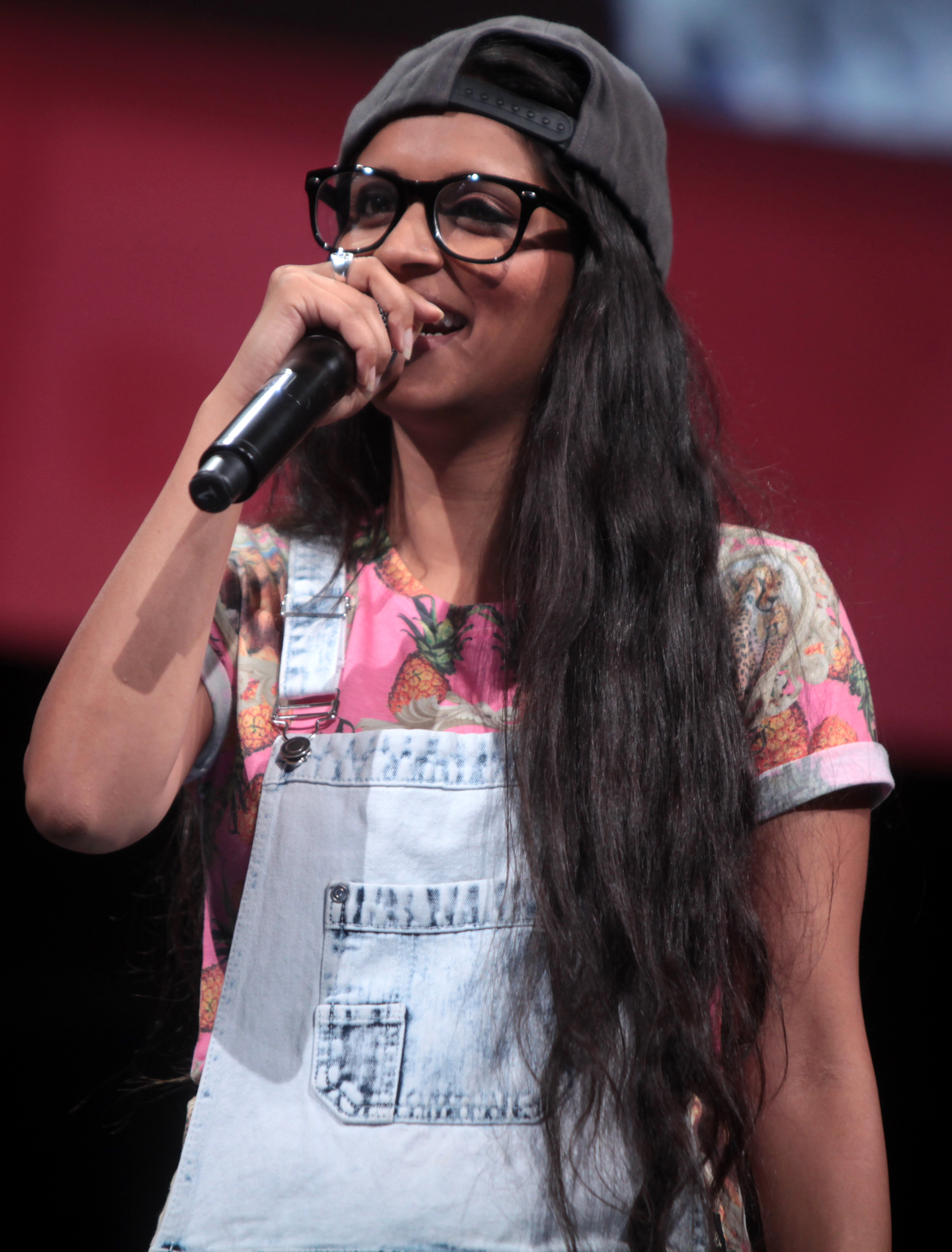
Lilly Singh, winner of the First Person category

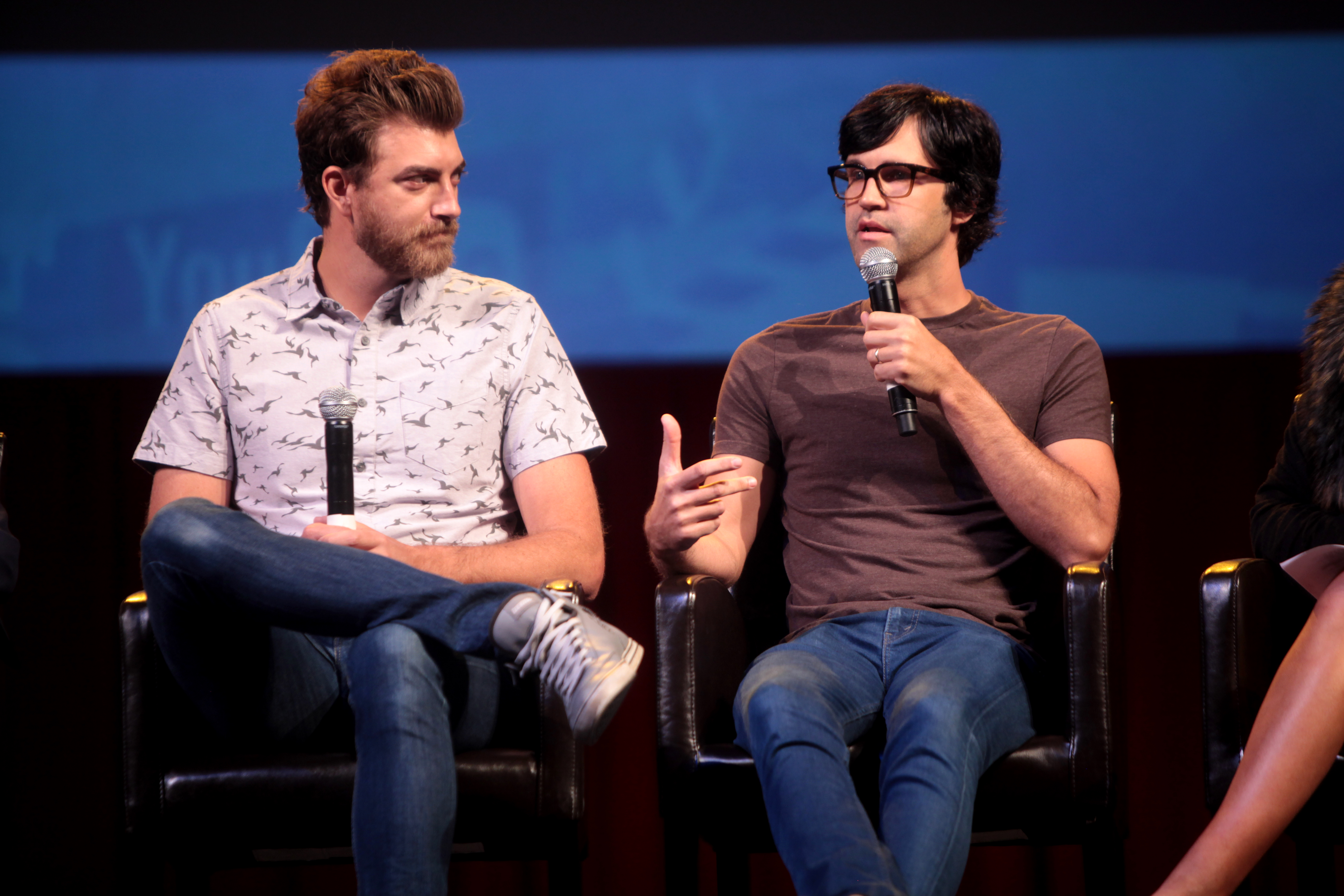
Rhett & Link, winners of the Non-Fiction category

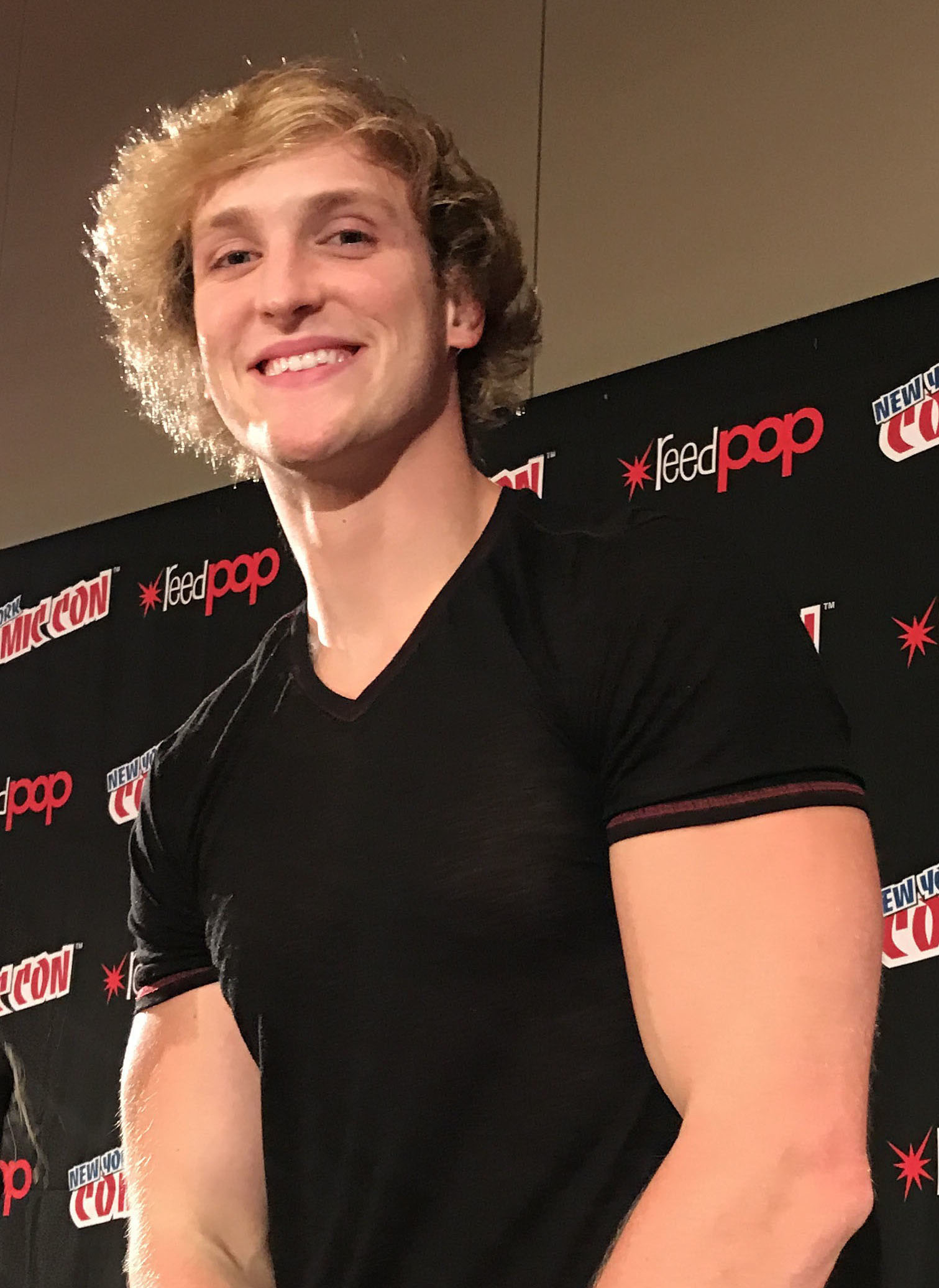
Logan Paul, winner of the Short Form Comedy category

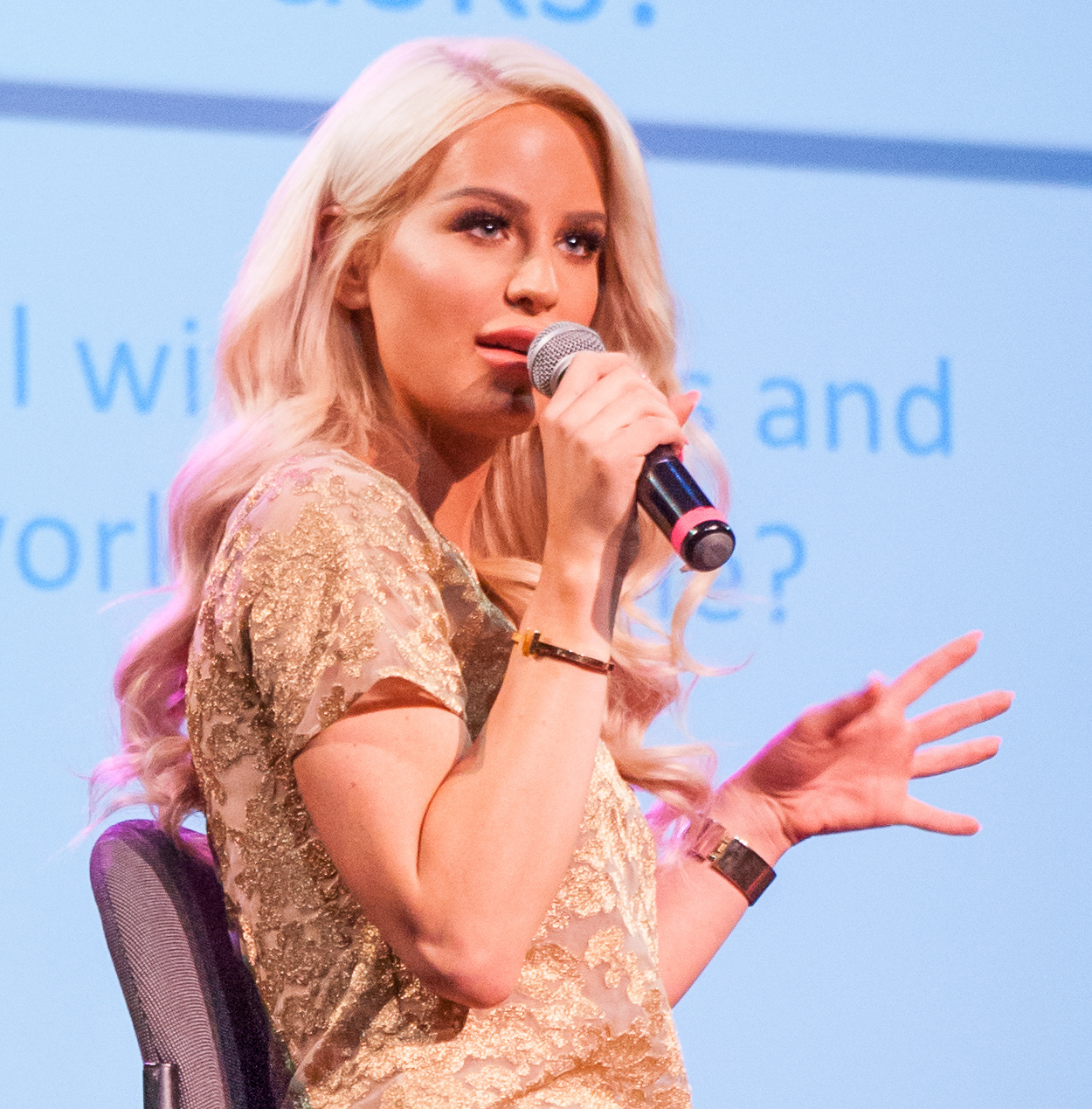
Gigi Gorgeous, winner of the Beauty category

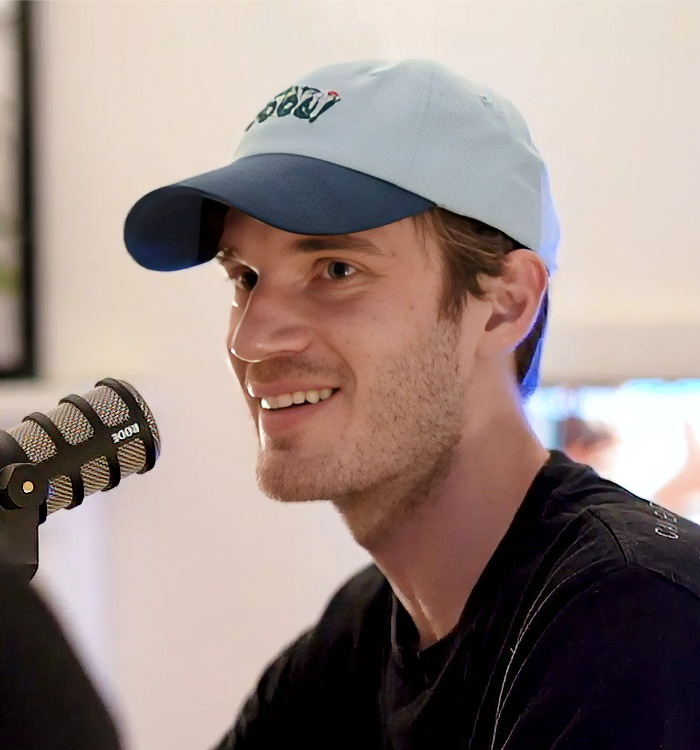
PewDiePie, winner of the Gaming category

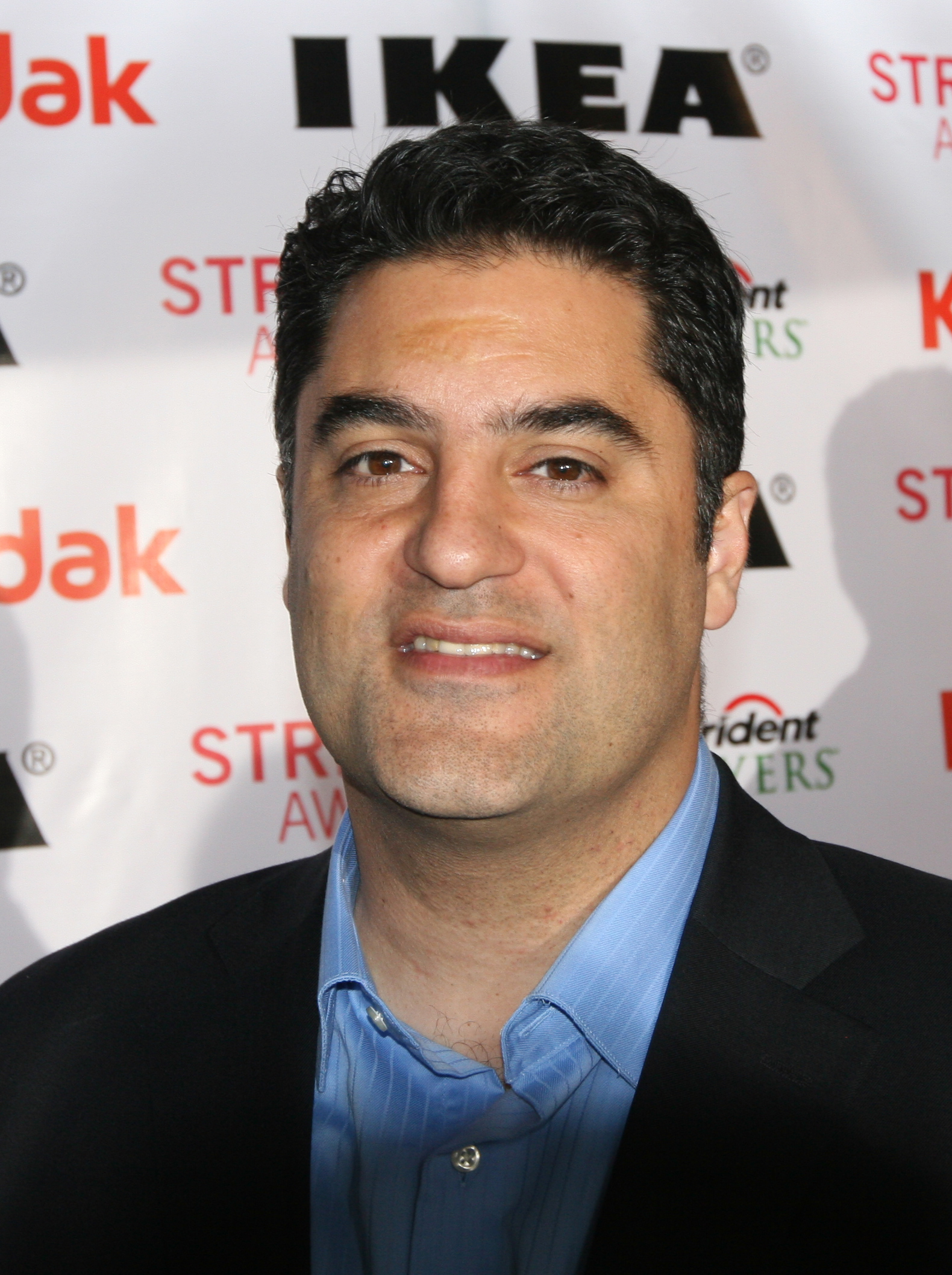
Cenk Uygur of The Young Turks, winner of the News and Culture category

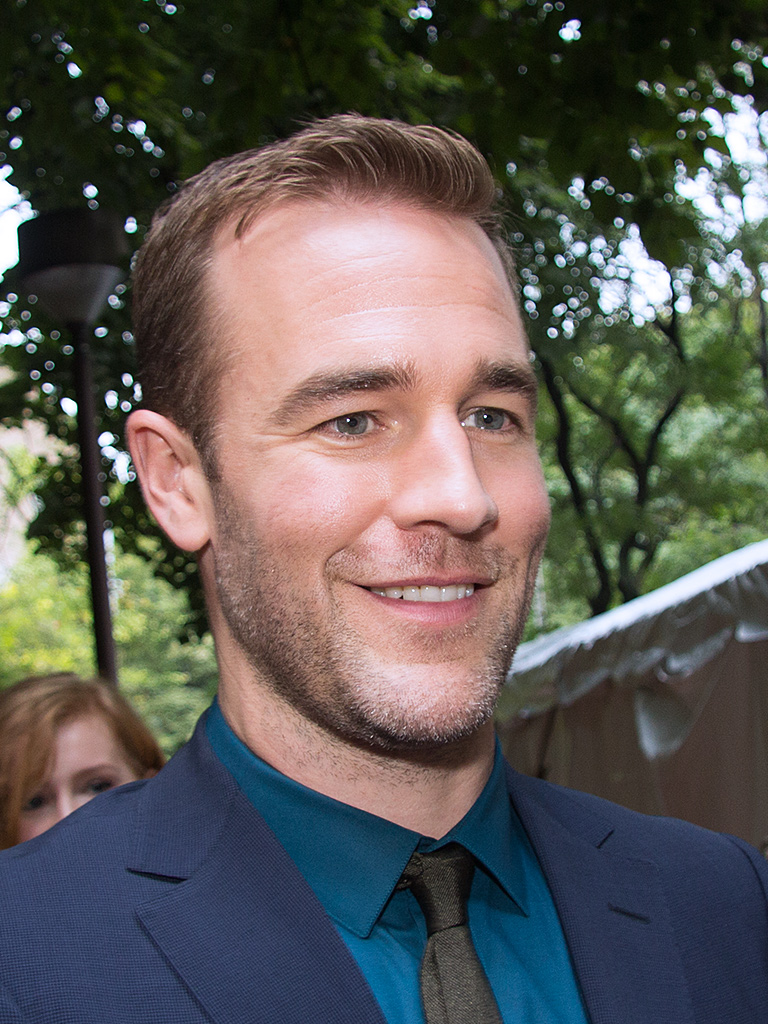
James Van Der Beek, winner of Best Actor

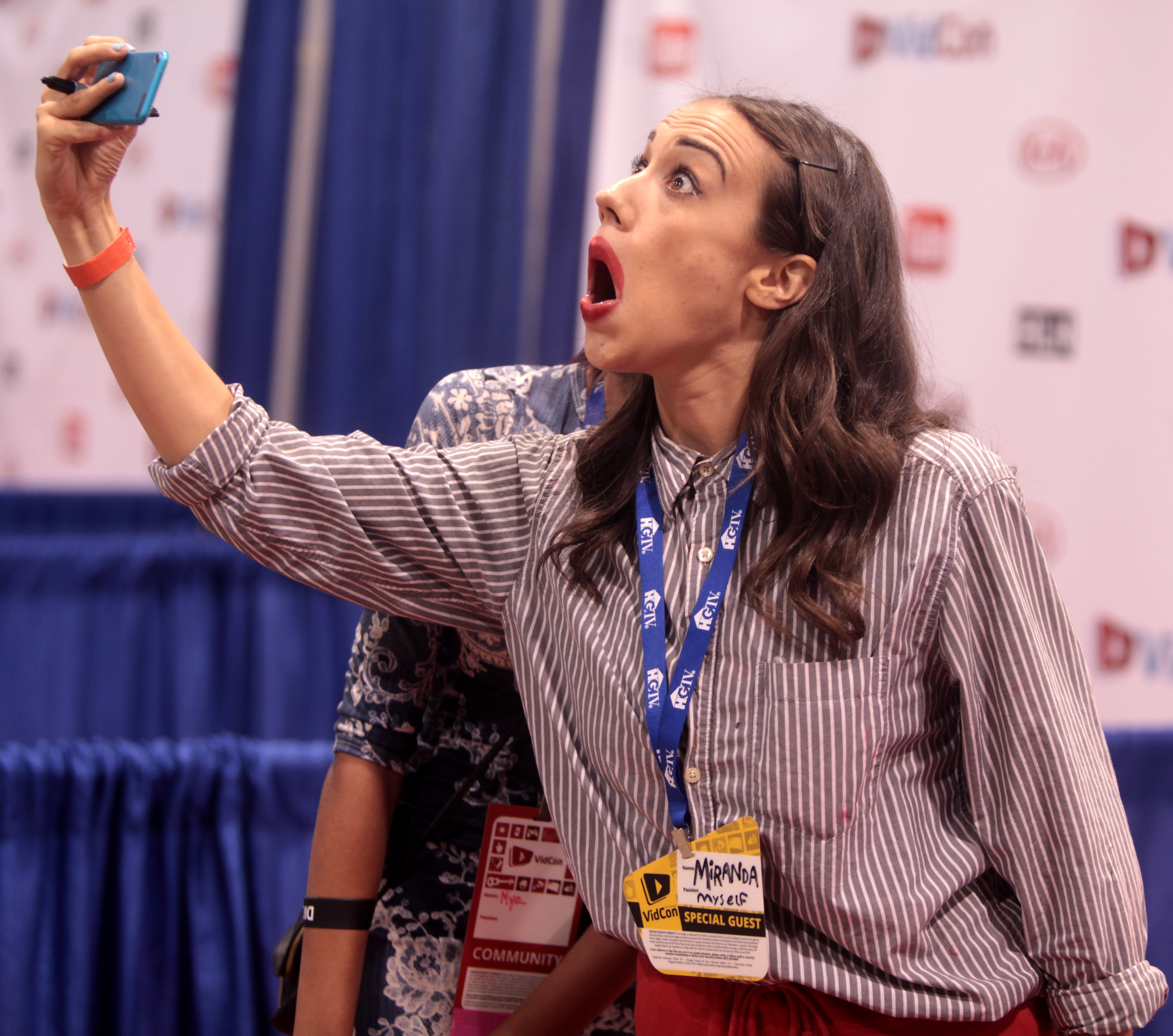
Colleen Ballinger, winner of Best Actress, in character as Miranda Sings

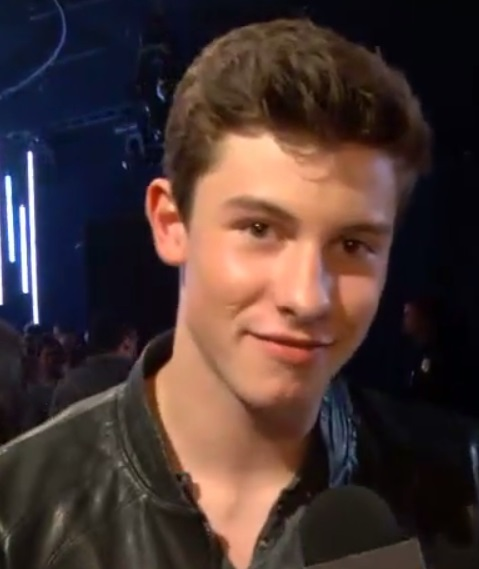
Shawn Mendes, winner of the Breakthrough Artist award

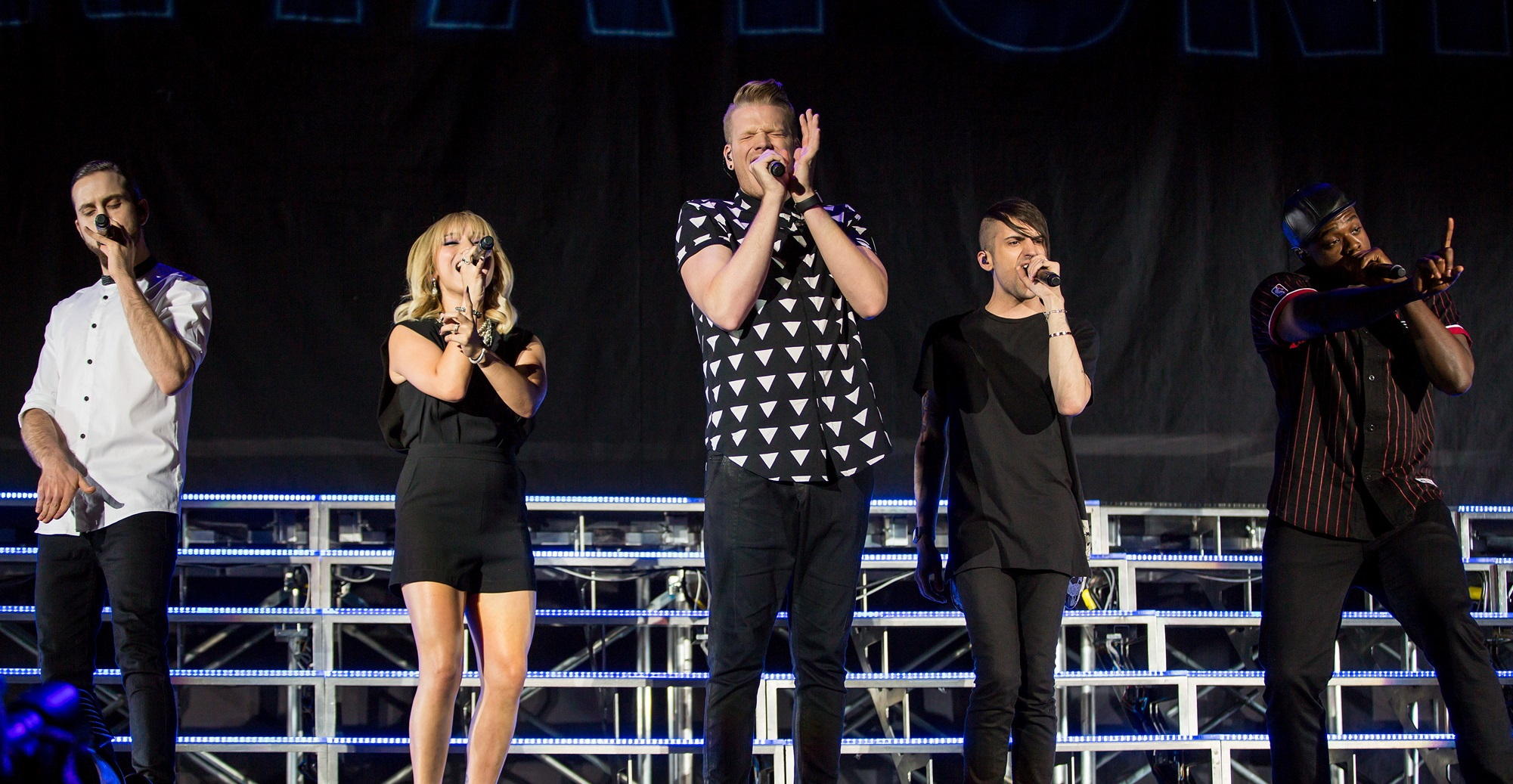
Pentatonix, winners of the Cover Song category

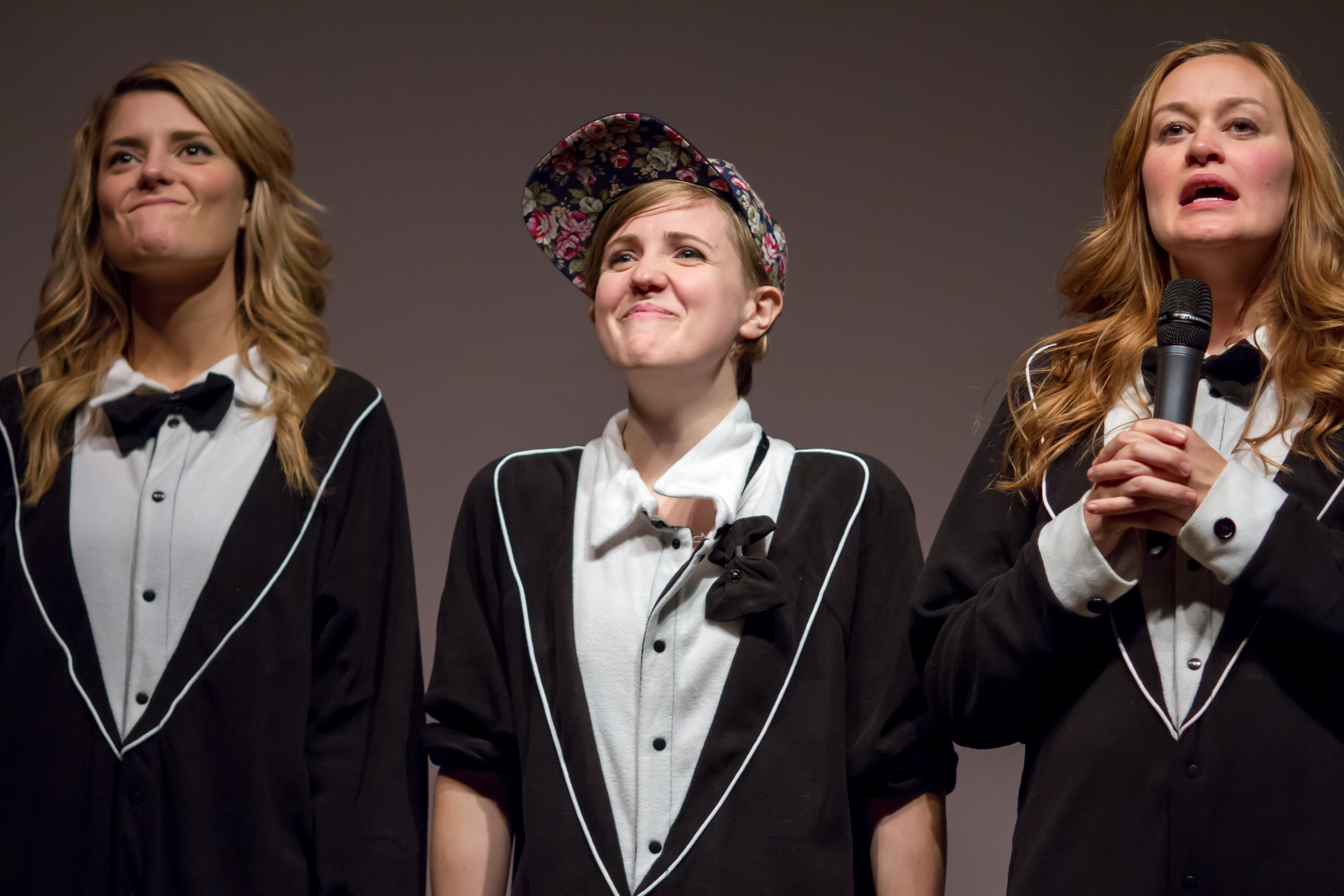
Mamrie Hart (right), winner of the Writing award, with Grace Helbig and Hannah Hart, winners in the Collaboration category

The nominees were announced on August 12, 2015 and the finalists for the Audience Choice Award categories were announced on September 3. 35 of the categories were announced on September 14 during the Official Streamys Nominee Reception at the YouTube Space LA. The remaining nine "marquee categories" were announced during the main ceremony at the Hollywood Palladium on September 17. Winners of the categories were selected by the Streamys Blue Ribbon Panel except for the Audience Choice awards which were put to a public vote.

Winners are listed first, in bold.

OVERALL
Audience Choice Award for Show of the Year	Audience Choice Award for Entertainer of the Year
**FouseyTUBE**; EnchufeTV; Good Mythical Morning; The Philip DeFranco Show; PrankvsPrank; Rooster Teeth; Smosh; SourceFed; Teens React; Video Game High School	**Cameron Dallas**; Connor Franta; Grace Helbig; Jack & Jack; Jenna Marbles; Kandee Johnson; King Bach; Miranda Sings; IISuperwomanII; Tyler Oakley
International	Breakout Creator
**RackaRacka**; EnchufeTV; HolaSoyGerman; Jack & Dean; Korean Englishman	**Matthew Santoro**; Lauren Elizabeth; Rachel Levin; Jenn McAllister; Arden Rose
Comedy	Drama
**Flula**; Ryan Higa; Jenna Marbles; Miranda Sings; Rhett & Link	**BlackBoxTV**; Anamnesis; Adi Shankar's Bootleg Universe; Carmilla; Frankenstein, MD
Animated	First Person
**Cyanide & Happiness**; Bee and Puppycat; Blank on Blank; RWBY; sWooZie	**IISuperwomanII**; BFvsGF; Grace Helbig; Tyler Oakley; PewDiePie
Indie	Non-Fiction
**Eat Our Feelings**; Anamnesis; The Katering Show; The New Adventures of Peter and Wendy; Player Piano	**Good Mythical Morning**; HeyUSA; Improv Everywhere; Kids React; Shaytards
Spin-Off	
**The Tonight Show Starring Jimmy Fallon: Backstage**; 30 for 30 Shorts (30 for 30); Hack Into Broad City (Broad City); Saturday Night Line (Saturday Night Live); Team Coco on Twitch (Conan)	
SOCIAL VIDEO
Viner	Snapchat Storyteller
**King Bach**; Cameron Dallas; Brittany Furlan; Lele Pons; DeStorm Power	**Shaun McBride (shonduras)**; Chris Carmichael (chriscarm); Jérôme Jarre (jeromejarre); Shay Mitchell (officialshaym); Ryan Seacrest (ryanseacrest)
Short Form Comedy	Short Form Creativity
**Logan Paul**; Brandon Calvillo; Brittany Furlan; Liane V; Rudy Mancuso	**SnapperHero**; Meagan Cignoli; Cyrene-Q; Zach King; Shaun McBride
SUBJECT AWARDS
Action and Sci-Fi	Beauty
**Corridor Digital**; Action Movie Kid; SnapperHero; Super Power Beat Down; Video Game High School	**Gigi Gorgeous**; Andrea's Choice; Kandee Johnson; Ingrid Nilsen; Michelle Phan
Documentary or Investigative	Fashion
**Atari: Game Over**; Queens of Kings; Rituals with Laura Ling; Street Cuts; Thank You And Sorry	**Lauren Elizabeth**; Maddi Bragg; Brooklyn And Bailey; Maiah Ocando; Amanda Steele
Food	Gaming
**Epic Meal Time**; Nerdy Nummies; SORTEDfood; Tasted; You Deserve a Drink	**PewDiePie**; The Game Theorists; Markiplier; Smosh Games; Stampylonghead
Health and Wellness	Kids and Family
**Blogilates**; BroScienceLife; Furious Pete; Superhero in Training; Tony Horton Fitness	**What's Up Moms**; Eh Bee Family; Kid President; Kids React; Shaytards
News and Culture	Pranks
**The Young Turks**; BuzzFeed Video; MTV Braless; The Philip DeFranco Show; SourceFed	**PrankVsPrank**; Roman Atwood; FouseyTUBE; The Janoskians; Magic of Rahat
Science and Education	Sports
**Vsauce**; Crash Course; DNews; It's Okay To Be Smart; SciShow	**Dude Perfect**; Brodie Smith; Devin Super Tramp; The Ginger Runner; Red Bull
PERFORMANCE
Actor	Actress
**James Van Der Beek, Adi Shankar's Bootleg Universe**; Bart Baker, Bart Baker; James Franco, Making A Scene with James Franco; Aasif Mandvi, Halal in the Family; Paul Scheer, Scheer-RL	**Colleen Ballinger, Miranda Sings**; Anna Akana, SnapperHero; Natasha Negovanlis, Carmilla; Ellary Porterfield, Video Game High School; Casey Wilson, The Hotwives of Orlando
Collaboration	Dance
**Nice Peter, EpicLLOYD, Grace Helbig, and Hannah Hart, Epic Rap Battles of History**; Jimmy Kimmel and Viewers, YouTube Challenge; JusReign and Timothy DeLaGhetto, YouTube Collaboration; Pentatonix and Lindsey Stirling, "Papaoutai" (Cover); Various Creators, YouTube Rewind 2015	**Dominic “D-trix” Sandoval**; Amymarie Gaertner; Israel “Izzy” Harris and Ashleigh Mitchell; Marquese Scott; Alyson Stoner
Ensemble Cast	
**Video Game High School**; Annoying Orange; The Hotwives of Orlando; Six Guys One Car; SnapperHero	
MUSIC
Breakthrough Artist
**Shawn Mendes**; Tori Kelly; Austin Mahone; MAX; Rachel Platten
Cover Song	Original Song
**Pentatonix, "Daft Punk Mashup" (Daft Punk)**; Andy Lange, Chester See, Andrew Garcia, and Josh Golden, "Roar" (Katy Perry); Madilyn Bailey, "Wake Me Up" (Avicii); Pomplamoose, "Happy"/"Get Lucky" Mashup (Pharrell Williams); Postmodern Jukebox, "Timber" (Pitbull ft. Ke$ha)	**"Whistle While I Work It", Chester See**; "#LEH", **IISuperwomanII** and Humble The Poet; "Airplanes and Terminals", Timothy DeLaGhetto; "Love Again", Pentatonix; "Never Wanna Let You Go", Megan Nicole
CRAFT AWARDS
Cinematography	Costume Design
**Devin Super Tramp, Devin Graham**; 2Cellos, Ivan Slipčević; Gymkhana, Jordan Valenti; Michelle Phan, RiceBunny Productions; Thirsty For..., Eric Slatkin and Jay Holzer	**Epic Rap Battles of History, Sulai Lopez**; Bart Baker, Amanda Hosler; The Britishes, Alisha Silverstein; The League of S.T.E.A.M., The League of S.T.E.A.M.; The Most Popular Girls in School, Jamie Brown, Mark Cope and Carlo Moss
Directing	Editing
**Video Game High School, Matt Arnold and Freddie Wong**; Adi Shankar's Bootleg Universe, Joseph Kahn; Kurt Hugo Schneider, Kurt Hugo Schneider; Improv Everywhere, Charlie Todd; SnapperHero, Sam Gorski, Niko Pueringer, and Jake Watson (Corridor)	**Epic Rap Battles of History, Andrew Sherman, Ryan Moulton, Daniel Turcan and Peter Shukoff**; The Fourth Door, Blayne Rabanal and Tony Valenzuela; The Game Theorists, Ronnie Edwards, Forrest Lee Black, and Ryder Burgin; Mystery Guitar Man, Joe Penna and Ryan Morrison; Vsauce, Michael Stevens and Guy Larsen
Visual and Special Effects	Writing
**Corridor Digital, Sam Gorski, Niko Pueringer, and Jake Watson**; Action Movie Kid, Daniel Hashimoto; Andrew M Films, Andrew McMurry; SnapperHero, Sam Gorski, Niko Pueringer, and Jake Watson; Zach King, Zach King	**You Deserve a Drink, Mamrie Hart**; Bad Lip Reading, Bad Lip Reading; Epic Rap Battles of History, Peter Shukoff, Lloyd Ahlquist, Zach Sherwin, Dante Cimadamore and Mike Betette; Honest Trailers, Spencer Gilbert, Dan Murrell, Erica Russell and Andy Signore; The Hotwives of Orlando, Dannah Phirman and Danielle Schneider
CAMPAIGNS
Brand Campaign	Social Good Campaign
**Crazy Plastic Ball Prank #WithDad, Roman Atwood (Nissan)**; Kitten Therapy, SoulPancake (Purina Tidy Cats); "Watch Me (Whip/Nae Nae)", DanceOn (Silentó); Totino Boy!, Tim & Eric (Totino's Pizza Rolls); Signature Pizzas, Jack & Jack, Rooster Teeth and Andrea Russett (Pizza Hut)	**#ProudToLove, Marriage Equality and LGBT Pride Month**; Arnold Pranks Fans as the Terminator...for Charity, After-School All Stars; Prank it FWD; Win a Coffee Date In LA with Connor Franta, Thirst Project; Tyler Oakley’s Birthday Campaign, The Trevor Project

=== Web series with multiple nominations and awards ===
Web series that received multiple nominations
Nominations	Web Series
6	SnapperHero
5	Video Game High School
4	Epic Rap Battles of History
3	Adi Shankar's Bootleg Universe
3	The Hotwives of Orlando
3	Miranda Sings
3	React
2	Action Movie Kid
2	Anamnesis
2	Carmilla
2	Corridor Digital
2	Devin Super Tramp
2	EnchufeTV
2	FouseyTUBE
2	The Game Theorists
2	Good Mythical Morning
2	Improv Everywhere
2	The Philip DeFranco Show
2	PrankvsPrank
2	Rooster Teeth
2	Shaytards
2	SourceFed
2	Vsauce
2	You Deserve a Drink

Web series that received multiple awards
Awards	Web series
3	Epic Rap Battles of History
2	Corridor Digital
2	Video Game High School

== Reception ==
Rae Votta of The Daily Dot praised the video segments that introduced each award category for the unique spin that was added to each video by the various online content creators which produced them. Votta also felt that the imposition of a strict runtime due to the event being televised made the show flow better when compared to previous years. The musical performances were well received, particularly Future's performance of "March Madness" which was praised by writers for Spin, Vulture, MTV News, and Vice. Hailee Steinfeld also received praise for her performance by Teen Vogue. Votta called the performances "flashy and impressive" but felt that they were disconnected from YouTube and online content creation. Writing for MTV News, Deepa Lakshmin praised Lilly Singh's acceptance speech in which she said "Lastly I want to say huge, huge shout-out to Google and YouTube for not being scared to put a brown girl on a billboard." Lakshmin called the speech "badass" and felt that it was especially meaningful for Indian fans of Singh's.

Reception of the event on social media was positive according to analysis done by the social TV platform Canvs, using data from Nielsen Twitter TV ratings, which found that an estimated 41.5% of reaction tweets to the event contained the emotion of "love" and 16.2% the reaction "congrats". According to Nielsen, the show was the leading social non-sports program on television the day it aired.
