= How It Should Have Ended =

Animated web series

- Genre: Comedy; Parody
- Created by: Daniel Baxter; Tommy Watson; Christina "Tina" Alexander
- Original language: English
- No. of episodes: 224

Original release
- Network: HowItShouldHaveEnded.com (2005–2007); YouTube (2007–present)
- Release: April 23, 2005 – present

How It Should Have Ended (HISHE) is an animated web series that parodies popular films, Video games, and TV shows by creating alternate endings and pointing out perceived flaws. Endings for many major films have been presented, using the tagline "Sometimes movies don't finish the way we'd like".

The series won the Streamy Award for Best Animated Web series at the 2nd Streamy Awards in 2010.

== History ==
How It Should Have Ended began after Daniel Baxter and Tommy Watson started discussing alternate endings for a film they had watched. In 2005, their first animation "How Star Wars Should Have Ended" was completed and soon after in July 2005 the website was established. Christina "Tina" Alexander, who has previously worked with Baxter, joined the team shortly thereafter.

HISHE was awarded the "Best Internet Parody" award for "How Superman Should Have Ended" by Spike TV at the 2006 Scream Awards at the Hollywood Pantages Theatre in California. and was featured in an MTV Comedy and Talent Showcase at the Hollywood Improv. It has also been featured as a Yahoo! Profile Pick and has appeared in both Fade In and Wired magazines.

On March 5, 2007, HISHE was launched on YouTube as HISHEdotcom. It has attracted notable appearances such as Stan Lee himself in the parody of The Amazing Spider-Man.

In September 2009, How It Should Have Ended joined Starz Digital Media which now handles all licensing. In April 2010, How It Should Have Ended was awarded the Streamy Award for Best Animated Web Series at the Orpheum Theatre in Los Angeles.

On June 30, 2013, a video was uploaded on TheFineBros channel which features the Teens React teens watching the Lord of the Rings, Harry Potter, and Hunger Games HISHE episodes.

In November 2013, Batman and Superman from Super Café guest starred in the Nostalgia Critic's review of Man of Steel, at the end of the episode where The Critic parodies Super Café. HISHE also featured in the Screen Junkies series Honest Trailers in the episodes about The Hobbit: The Battle of the Five Armies and Star Trek Into Darkness, with HISHE in turn inviting members of Screen Junkies onboard as guest writers.

=== Statistics ===
As of April 2, 2025, HISHE had 10.5 million subscribers and more than 3.3 billion views. At the same time, HISHE had amassed over 353,000 followers on its Facebook account, over 119,000 followers on its Instagram account and over 31,400 followers on its Twitter account.

=== Running gags ===
The series features running gags, including, but not limited to:

- In the Super Café segments, Batman and Superman discuss the actions of characters in current or upcoming superhero films, to which Batman almost always says he can do them better "Because I'm Batman!". Whenever an attractive female character appears in the café, Batman flirts with her by offering to reveal his secret identity.
- In Star Wars episodes (and on rare instances, episodes based on other films such as Guardians of the Galaxy Vol. 2) Darth Vader (or some variation of Anakin Skywalker depending on the era) gets overly giddy and excited when he finds out about his descendants or when someone's lineage is revealed, much to the chagrin of those around him.
- In episodes themed around Captain America films, the characters tease Captain America by singing a parody of his theme song from The Marvel Super Heroes, bringing up everything that did not surrender to him in the MCU up to that point.
  - This was further referenced in the episode for Avengers: Endgame when Steve did it to Falcon after passing the mantle, and in the episode for The Falcon and the Winter Soldier, by Sam and Bucky after John Walker, the government appointed Captain America, lost the shield after one of the Dora Milaje stole it.
- Characters frequently tend to reference or parody other characters played by the same actors as them. For instance, in any film featuring a character played by actor Andy Serkis (i.e. Supreme Leader Snoke from Star Wars sequel trilogy, Ulysses Klaue from the Marvel Cinematic Universe, etc.), the parody features the character with the voice of Gollum from the Lord of the Rings film series, Serkis' best known film role.
- In some episodes about superhero films (Marvel or DC), whenever a character is about to utter a profanity in a key scene, Captain America quickly jumps in and cuts them off, exclaiming "Language!" (referencing the opening scene in Avengers: Age of Ultron where he does so to Iron Man). In one episode parodying Avengers: Endgame, the role is reversed, with Captain America nearly swearing and being cut off by Deadpool.
- In alternate endings where certain characters survive films they would have died in (e.g. Quicksilver in Avengers: Age of Ultron, Polka-Dot Man in The Suicide Squad, Aunt May in Spider-Man: No Way Home and Gilgamesh in Eternals) said character says "One of us might have died" in the aftermath.
- The Joker regularly annoying and mocking Lord Voldemort in different ways.
- In episodes for Spider-Man films, a man in a lab coat appears and says "Here's a bright idea!", before advising the characters in certain scenes to do something different than what they were planning to do (with more common sense), thereby alleviating the advances of the plot that would have resulted (usually with the villains coming to power). The first instance of this occurring was in the episode for Spider-Man 3, in which the man who says "Here's a bright idea!" orders the scientists who were running the sand particle experiment to check the sand after initially believing the change in the silicon mass to be a bird. This would result in Flint Marko being arrested and preventing his transformation into Sandman.

=== Critical reception ===
Tubefilter ran an article covering How It Should Have Ended and discussing its fanbase.

HISHE was described by Ben Mitchell as "another revived entry in the pantheon of web series. Each episode astutely appropriates both what makes a viral film stand out (humor, topical references, accessible satire, fastpaced timing while appealing to its audience's love/hâte relationship with pop culture)".

Kennedy Unthank of Plugged In wrote: "Often, How It Should Have Ended's changes point out the more obvious, logical response that characters likely would have had if the movie was a bit more realistic. However, the YouTube channel's satire is soft enough that it's clear the point of each video isn't to mock the movie, but to point out its flaws through constructive criticism."

Writing for Fugues, Benoit Migneault found the versions proposed "irresistibly funny" and "sometimes touching".

== Accolades ==
The series won the Streamy Award for Best Animated Web series at the 2nd Streamy Awards in 2010.

== Episodes ==
=== How It Should Have Ended (HISHE) ===
No.	Title	Original upload date
1	"The Matrix Revolutions"	June 29, 2005
2	"Saving Private Ryan"	June 30, 2005
3	"Star Wars: Episode IV – A New Hope"	July 23, 2005
4	"Braveheart"	July 31, 2005
5	"Se7en"	August 31, 2005
6	"The Blair Witch Project"	October 31, 2005
7	"The Lord of the Rings"	January 31, 2006
8	"Willy Wonka"	March 9, 2006
9	"Underworld"	May 30, 2006
10	"Superman"	July 27, 2006
11	"Weird Science"	August 29, 2006
12	"Texas Chainsaw Massacre"	October 20, 2006
13	"Borat"	November 8, 2006
14	"It's a Wonderful Life"	December 26, 2006
15	"Pirates of the Caribbean: Dead Man's Chest"	March 12, 2007
16	"Spider-Man 3"	October 3, 2007
17	"Beowulf"	April 7, 2008
18	"Terminator"	September 30, 2009
19	"Transformers: Revenge of the Fallen"	October 21, 2009
20	"Twilight"	November 18, 2009
21	"The Wizard of Oz"	December 22, 2009
22	"Avatar"	January 27, 2010
23	"Star Trek"	February 25, 2010
24	"2012"	March 23, 2010
25	"Iron Man"	May 4, 2010
26	"Predator"	May 27, 2010
27	"Lost"	June 29, 2010
28	"Indiana Jones and the Kingdom of the Crystal Skull"	July 29, 2010
29	"Inception"	October 7, 2010
30	"Star Wars: Episode V – The Empire Strikes Back"	September 24, 2010
31	"Saw"	October 15, 2010
32	"The Social Network"	November 4, 2010
33	"The Tron HISHE Rap"	December 21, 2010
34	"Top Gun"	January 13, 2011
35	"Aliens"	February 4, 2011
36	"The Dark Knight"	February 24, 2011
37	"District 9"	March 24, 2011
38	"Scream"	April 14, 2011
39	"Call of Duty: Modern Warfare 2"	April 29, 2011
40	"Halo: Reach"	April 29, 2011
41	"Toy Story 3"	May 5, 2011
42	"Mortal Kombat"	May 26, 2011
43	"Thor"	June 2, 2011
44	"Jaws"	June 24, 2011
45	"300"	July 13, 2011
46	"Harry Potter"	August 18, 2011
47	"Super Mario Bros."	September 1, 2011
48	"Captain America"	September 8, 2011
49	"World of Warcraft"	September 22, 2011
50	"Jurassic Park"	September 28, 2011
51	"Ghostbusters"	October 20, 2011
52	"God of War"	November 3, 2011
53	"X-Men: First Class"	November 30, 2011
54	"Resident Evil"	December 15, 2011
55	"BioShock"	January 19, 2012
56	"Star Wars: Episode VI – Return of the Jedi"	January 25, 2012
57	"Sherlock Holmes: A Game of Shadows"	February 16, 2012
58	"Pulp Fiction"	March 23, 2012
59	"Game of Thrones Season 1"	March 28, 2012
60	"Assassin's Creed"	April 12, 2012
61	"Hunger Games"	April 19, 2012
62	"The Avengers"	May 31, 2012
63	"Tangled"	June 20, 2012
64	"Titanic"	June 27, 2012
65	"Prometheus"	July 25, 2012
66	"Skyrim"	August 2, 2012
67	"The Dark Knight Rises"	August 23, 2012
68	"Mass Effect 3"	September 20, 2012
69	"The Amazing Spider-Man"	September 27, 2012
70	"Paranormal Activity 1, 2, & 3"	October 24, 2012
71	"The Bourne Identity"	November 1, 2012
72	"Casino Royale"	November 8, 2012
73	"Looper"	November 28, 2012
74	"Twilight: Breaking Dawn – Part 2"	January 4, 2013
75	"The Hobbit"	January 18, 2013
76	"Stan Lee's Star Wars HISHE (Full Length Version)"	February 13, 2013
77	"Portal"	March 15, 2013
78	"Indiana Jones and the Last Crusade"	April 25, 2013
79	"Oblivion"	May 10, 2013
80	"Iron Man 3"	May 30, 2013
81	"Fast & Furious 6"	June 26, 2013
82	"Man of Steel"	July 16, 2013
83	"Pacific Rim"	August 21, 2013
84	"Star Trek Into Darkness"	October 2, 2013
85	"World War Z"	October 29, 2013
86	"Doctor Who: Doomsday"	November 18, 2013
87	"Thor: The Dark World"	December 18, 2013
88	"The Desolation of Smaug"	January 15, 2014
89	"Star Wars: Episode I – The Phantom Menace"	February 3, 2014
90	"Batman Begins"	February 28, 2014
91	"Frozen (Original HISHE (Repost))"	April 14, 2014
92	"The Lego Movie"	April 30, 2014
93	"Godzilla"	July 11, 2014
94	"Captain America: The Winter Soldier"	August 5, 2014
95	"The Amazing Spider-Man 2"	September 23, 2014
96	"The Maze Runner"	October 9, 2014
97	"Guardians of the Galaxy"	November 18, 2014
98	"How to Train Your Dragon 2"	December 28, 2014
99	"X-Men: Days of Future Past"	February 11, 2015
100	"The Battle of the Five Armies"	March 24, 2015
101	"Teenage Mutant Ninja Turtles"	April 15, 2015
102	"Avengers: Age of Ultron Part 1"	June 2, 2015
103	"Avengers: Age of Ultron Part 2"	June 15, 2015
104	"Jurassic World"	July 10, 2015
105	"Inside Out"	July 29, 2015
106	"Big Hero 6"	September 22, 2015
107	"Ant-Man"	October 7, 2015
108	"Back to the Future, 2"	October 20, 2015
109	"Star Wars: Episode II – Attack of the Clones"	November 24, 2015
110	"Star Wars: Episode III – Revenge of the Sith"	December 16, 2015
111	"Star Wars: Episode VII – The Force Awakens"	February 10, 2016
112	"The Good Dinosaur"	February 15, 2016
113	"Deadpool"	March 9, 2016
114	"The Revenant"	March 29, 2016
115	"The Jungle Book"	April 12, 2016
116	"Batman v Superman: Dawn of Justice"	May 4, 2016
117	"Finding Nemo"	June 14, 2016
118	"Captain America: Civil War"	July 6, 2016
119	"X-Men: Apocalypse"	July 26, 2016
120	"Teenage Mutant Ninja Turtles: Out of the Shadows"	September 6, 2016
121	"Star Trek Beyond"	October 4, 2016
122	"Suicide Squad"	October 11, 2016
123	"Star Wars (Special Edition)"	December 15, 2016
124	"Doctor Strange"	January 31, 2017
125	"Rogue One: A Star Wars Story"	March 1, 2017
126	"Beauty and the Beast"	March 14, 2017
127	"Logan"	April 11, 2017
128	"The Lego Batman Movie"	June 12, 2017
129	"Moana"	June 19, 2017
130	"Kong: Skull Island"	July 18, 2017
131	"Guardians of the Galaxy Vol. 2"	August 10, 2017
132	"Wonder Woman"	September 12, 2017
133	"Spider-Man: Homecoming"	October 17, 2017
134	"The Incredibles"	November 16, 2017
135	"Thor: Ragnarok"	January 8, 2018
136	"Star Wars: Episode VIII – The Last Jedi"	February 12, 2018
137	"Justice League"	April 8, 2018
138	"It"	May 10, 2018
139	"Black Panther"	May 16, 2018
140	"Avengers: Infinity War"	June 28, 2018
141	"Deadpool 2"	August 6, 2018
142	"Jurassic World: Fallen Kingdom"	September 18, 2018
143	"Solo: A Star Wars Story"	September 25, 2018
144	"Ant-Man and the Wasp"	October 18, 2018
145	"Incredibles 2"	November 6, 2018
146	"Fantastic Beasts and Where to Find Them"	November 13, 2018
147	"Aquaman"	January 31, 2019
148	"The Meg"	February 7, 2019
149	"Spider-Man: Into the Spider-Verse"	March 5, 2019
150	"Bumblebee"	April 1, 2019
151	"Captain Marvel"	April 24, 2019
152	"Shazam!"	May 7, 2019
153	"Aladdin"	May 20, 2019
154	"Avengers: Endgame"	June 12, 2019
155	"Venom"	July 8, 2019
156	"The Lion King"	July 20, 2019
157	"Spider-Man: Far From Home"	August 27, 2019
158	"Godzilla: King of the Monsters"	September 18, 2019
159	"It Chapter Two"	October 17, 2019
160	"Joker"	November 27, 2019
161	"Jumanji: Welcome to the Jungle"	December 10, 2019
162	"Terminator: Dark Fate"	January 15, 2020
163	"Star Wars: Episode IX – The Rise of Skywalker"	February 12, 2020
164	"Frozen 2"	March 12, 2020
165	"Sonic the Hedgehog"	April 22, 2020
166	"Birds of Prey (and the Fantabulous Emancipation of One Harley Quinn)"	June 11, 2020
167	"Spider-Man 2"	July 22, 2020
168	"The Mandalorian (Season One)"	October 7, 2020
169	"Iron Man 2"	December 8, 2020
170	"Wonder Woman 1984"	February 10, 2021
171	"WandaVision"	April 22, 2021
172	"The Falcon and the Winter Soldier"	June 15, 2021
173	"Godzilla vs. Kong"	June 30, 2021
174	"Black Widow"	August 25, 2021
175	"The Suicide Squad"	October 21, 2021
176	"Shang-Chi and the Legend of the Ten Rings"	November 17, 2021
177	"Venom: Let There Be Carnage"	November 30, 2021
178	"Spider-Man"	December 13, 2021
179	"Spider-Man: No Way Home"	March 3, 2022
180	"Zack Snyder's Justice League"	April 14, 2022
181	"The Batman"	April 22, 2022
182	"Sonic the Hedgehog 2"	June 14, 2022
183	"Doctor Strange in the Multiverse of Madness"	July 6, 2022
184	"Thor: Love and Thunder"	October 4, 2022
185	"Stranger Things (Seasons 1–4)"	October 28, 2022
186	"Jurassic World Dominion"	November 4, 2022
187	"Top Gun: Maverick"	November 19, 2022
188	"Black Adam"	December 7, 2022
189	"Eternals"	December 20, 2022
190	"Obi-Wan Kenobi"	December 27, 2022
191	"Avatar: The Way of Water"	February 22, 2023
192	"Black Panther: Wakanda Forever"	March 14, 2023
193	"Ant-Man and the Wasp: Quantumania"	April 20, 2023
194	"Shazam! Fury of the Gods"	May 3, 2023
195	"The Little Mermaid"	May 18, 2023
196	"The Super Mario Bros. Movie"	June 21, 2023
197	"Guardians of the Galaxy Vol. 3"	July 19, 2023
198	"The Flash"	October 9, 2023
199	"Zootopia"	October 17, 2023
200	"Spider-Man: Across the Spider-Verse"	October 24, 2023
201	"Barbie"	November 7, 2023
202	"Indiana Jones and the Dial of Destiny"	November 13, 2023
203	"Transformers: Rise of the Beasts"	November 28, 2023
204	"The Marvels"	December 13, 2023
205	"Batman"	December 22, 2023
206	"Dune"	February 7, 2024
207	"Madame Web"	April 2, 2024
208	"Deadpool & Wolverine"	September 26, 2024
209	"Joker: Folie à Deux"	October 29, 2024
210	"Gladiator"	November 21, 2024
211	"Elf"	December 20, 2024
212	"The Penguin"	February 7, 2025
213	"Captain America: Brave New World"	March 13, 2025
214	"A Minecraft Movie"	April 26, 2025
215	"Thunderbolts*"	May 23, 2025
216	"Sonic the Hedgehog 3"	June 12, 2025
217	"Superman (2025)"	August 29, 2025
218	"The Fantastic Four: First Steps"	October 27, 2025
219	"Five Nights at Freddy's"	December 6, 2025
220	"Stranger Things (Season 5)"	February 2, 2026
221	"Zootopia 2"	March 10, 2026
222	"The Super Mario Galaxy Movie"	April 30, 2026
223	"Supergirl"	July 22, 2026
224	"Spider-Man: Brand New Day"	September 8, 2026
225	"Avengers Endgame: Encore"	October 2, 2026

=== Remastered episodes ===
No.	Title	Original upload date
1	"Spider-Man 3"	October 4, 2018
2	"Top Gun"	May 25, 2022
3	"Avatar"	December 12, 2022
4	"Transformers: Revenge of the Fallen"	June 6, 2023
5	"Willy Wonka"	December 15, 2023
6	"Ghostbusters"	March 23, 2024
7	"The Wizard of Oz"	November 14, 2024
8	"Toy Story 3"	June 11, 2026

=== Bonus and extended scenes ===
No.	Title	Original upload date
1	"How to Survive an Alien Attack – Men in Black, Signs, Aliens, Mars Attacks!, Starship Troopers, Predator, War of the Worlds, Independence Day"	February 28, 2006
2	"Ocean's 40 Trailer"	April 29, 2007
3	"The Holiday Movie Special – How the Grinch Stole Christmas, The Nightmare Before Christmas, The Santa Clause, Rudolph the Red-Nosed Reindeer, Gremlins, The Polar Express, A Christmas Carol, Frosty the Snowman, Jingle All the Way, A Charlie Brown Christmas, A Christmas Story, Home Alone, National Lampoon's Christmas Vacation, Elf"	November 23, 2010
4	"The Best Picture Summary 2011"	February 25, 2011
5	"Empire Strikes Back 'Happy Vader'"	September 15, 2011
6	"Twilight 'Vampire Staring Contest'"	November 17, 2011
7	"Indiana Jones 4 'Broken Bones Jones'"	December 22, 2011
8	"Lost – Hurley"	December 29, 2011
9	"Star Trek – Deleted Scene"	February 9, 2012
10	"Harry Potter and the Best Picture Summary"	February 23, 2012
11	"Return of the Jedi Bloopers: Exhaust Plorts"	April 5, 2012
12	"Hunger Games: Tree Scene"	April 26, 2012
13	"Transformers Play Battleship"	May 24, 2012
14	"Avengers Bonus Scene"	June 7, 2012
15	"The Dark Knight Rises Bonus Scene"	August 30, 2012
16	"The Slender Games"	September 13, 2012
17	"The Amazing Spider-Man – Bonus Scene"	October 4, 2012
18	"The Zombie Song – Resident Evil"	October 11, 2012
19	"How the Batman v Superman SDCC Teaser Should Have Ended"	August 14, 2014
20	"The Lego HISHE 2 (The Alternate Ending)"	August 26, 2014
21	"Megatron Misses Shia"	September 29, 2014
22	"HISHE Bonus Bundle – The Amazing Spider-Man 2, Captain America: The Winter Soldier, The Phantom Menace, Man of Steel, The Empire Strikes Back"	October 22, 2014
23	"How the Avengers: Age of Ultron Teaser Should Have Ended"	October 30, 2014
24	"Batman Meets Galadriel"	April 1, 2015
25	"Jurassic World – Raptor Training?"	February 5, 2015
26	"Bat Blood – A Batman v Superman and Bad Blood Parody Featuring Batman"	September 10, 2015
27	"Rey's Jedi Training Directed by Quentin Tarantino"	April 1, 2016
28	"Star Wars: The Force Awakens Alternate HISHE"	April 7, 2016
29	"Arrival Trailer"	August 16, 2016
30	"Captain America: Civil War Alternate HISHE"	September 13, 2016
31	"Nuthin' but an Alien – An Alien and Dr. Dre Parody"	May 15, 2017
32	"Hulk Spoils Movies"	July 25, 2017
33	"Here Comes My Arrow – Guardians of the Galaxy Vol. 2 Parody"	August 21, 2017
34	"The Sound of Violence – Musical Parody"	November 22, 2017
35	"Star Wars – Best Picture Summary – Oscars 2018"	February 27, 2018
36	"Ocean's Over 40 Official Trailer"	June 4, 2018
37	"Jurassic World Alternate HISHE"	June 18, 2018
38	"Avengers: Infinity War Alternate HISHE"	July 26, 2018
39	"How the Venom Trailer Should Have Ended"	September 5, 2018
40	"How the Avengers: Endgame Trailer Should Have Ended"	December 19, 2018
41	"How the Spider-Man: Far From Home Trailer Should Have Ended"	May 15, 2019
42	"Avengers: Endgame Alternate HISHE"	June 20, 2019
43	"How Captain America Should Have Returned the Stones"	July 23, 2019
44	"Bonus Features Spider-Man: Far From Home HISHE"	September 6, 2019
45	"The Avengers – Best Picture Summary 2020"	February 3, 2020
46	"Spider-Man – Best Picture Summary 2022"	March 25, 2022
47	"Megatron Wants a Movie"	June 8, 2023
48	"Previously on Dune – Part One"	February 29, 2024
49	"Previously on Mad Max: Fury Road"	May 21, 2024
50	"Inside Deadpool"	July 24, 2024
51	"Yoda Cancels The Acolyte"	August 23, 2024
52	"Where's the Dog - Superman HISHE"	July 7, 2025
53	"Superman HISHE - Breakfast For My Food"	September 9, 2025
54	"Predator: Badlands HISHE - Breakfast For My Food"	November 6, 2025
55	"Mario Likes to Party"	March 31, 2026

=== HISHE Dubs ===
No.	Title	Original upload date
1	"Blade Runner"	October 3, 2017
2	"Batman v Superman: Dawn of Justice"	November 13, 2017
3	"Star Wars: The Force Awakens"	February 5, 2018
4	"Pacific Rim"	March 20, 2018
5	"Jurassic World"	June 11, 2018
6	"Predator"	September 10, 2018
7	"Ready Player One"	November 20, 2018
8	"Transformers"	December 19, 2018
9	"Avengers: Infinity War"	April 19, 2019
10	"Avengers: Endgame"	October 24, 2019
11	"Frozen"	November 19, 2019
12	"Star Wars: The Last Jedi"	December 16, 2019
13	"A Quiet Place"	March 19, 2020
14	"Star Wars: The Rise of Skywalker"	May 26, 2020
15	"Jaws"	June 23, 2020
16	"Wonder Woman"	September 29, 2020
17	"Venom"	October 22, 2020
18	"Jurassic Park"	November 19, 2020
19	"The Lord of the Rings: The Fellowship of the Ring"	December 15, 2020
20	"Justice League"	March 16, 2021
21	"Toy Story"	June 23, 2021
22	"Suicide Squad"	August 5, 2021
23	"Twilight"	October 28, 2021
24	"The Matrix"	March 17, 2022
25	"Spider-Man: No Way Home"	December 5, 2023

=== HISHE Reviews ===
No.	Title	Original upload date
1	"Batman v Superman"	March 28, 2016
2	"Civil War"	May 10, 2016
3	"Suicide Squad"	August 9, 2016
4	"Doctor Strange"	November 8, 2016
5	"Rogue One"	December 20, 2016
6	"Guardians of the Galaxy Vol. 2"	May 8, 2017
7	"Wonder Woman"	June 5, 2017
8	"Spider-Man: Homecoming"	July 13, 2017
9	"Thor: Ragnarok"	November 7, 2017
10	"Justice League"	November 21, 2017
11	"The Last Jedi"	December 19, 2017
12	"Black Panther"	February 20, 2018
13	"Avengers: Infinity War"	May 1, 2018
14	"Solo: A Star Wars Story"	May 25, 2018
15	"Avengers: Endgame"	May 2, 2019
16	"The Rise of Skywalker"	December 22, 2019
17	"Doctor Strange in the Multiverse of Madness"	May 13, 2022
18	"Cocaine Bear"	March 1, 2023
19	"Shazam! Fury of the Gods"	March 22, 2023
20	"The Super Mario Bros. Movie"	April 11, 2023
21	"Guardians of the Galaxy Vol. 3"	May 10, 2023

=== HISHE Features ===
On May 12, 2015, HISHE launched a series named HISHE Features. This series aims to put the spotlight on lesser known YouTube animators or film-related channels. It is also used to bridge the gap between HISHE's own videos. The series has been a success, both in terms of views and features, which include Ricepirate, OnlyLeigh, BrotherhoodWorkshop as well as Hank & Jed. The series has however received some criticism from fans who believe the content is not up to par with HISHE's own and could therefore damage their reputation. HISHE has responded by refuting these claims stating that it is beneficial to all parties involved.

==== BrotherhoodWorkshop ====
No.	Title	Original upload date
1	"Lego Batman Is Jelly"	November 5, 2014
2	"Lego HISHE – Sand People Are Bad Shots"	December 8, 2014
3	"Even Orcs Know"	July 21, 2015
4	"Lego Age of Ultron in 2 Minutes"	October 1, 2015
5	"Star Wars: Episode VII – The Force Awakens Lego HISHE"	March 22, 2016
6	"Harry Potter in 90 Seconds (Lego Stop-Motion)"	November 15, 2016
7	"Rogue One Lego HISHE – Chirrut vs. Everything"	September 21, 2017
8	"Star Wars: The Last Jedi Lego Summary"	July 12, 2018

==== Movie Mash ====
No.	Title	Original upload date
1	"Gremlins and Taken"	January 20, 2015
2	"The Hunger Games and RoboCop"	March 12, 2015
3	"Cast Away and Jaws"	September 3, 2015

==== Total Spoilage ====
No.	Title	Original upload date
1	"Lord of the Rings"	February 19, 2015
2	"Avengers Assemble"	July 16, 2015
3	"The Martian"	February 23, 2016

==== After Credits ====
No.	Title	Original upload date
1	"Interstellar"	April 5, 2016
2	"Indiana Jones and the Kingdom of the Crystal Skull"	May 31, 2016
3	"Superman"	July 12, 2016
4	"Mad Max: Fury Road"	August 23, 2016
5	"X-Men Apocalypse"	October 18, 2016
6	"Predator"	November 29, 2016
7	"Batman v Superman"	April 4, 2017

==== Five Stages of Watching ====
No.	Title	Original upload date
1	"Five Stages of Watching a Marvel Movie"	April 24, 2015
2	"Five Stages of Watching a Pixar Movie"	June 18, 2015
3	"Five Stages of Watching a Young-Adult Movie"	December 1, 2015
4	"Five Stages of Watching a Purge Movie"	October 25, 2016
5	"Five Stages of Watching a Disney Remake"	April 27, 2017
6	"Five Stages of Watching a Spider-Man Reboot"	July 5, 2017
7	"Five Stages of Watching a Star Wars Movie"	May 21, 2018

==== Hero Swap ====
No.	Title	Original upload date
1	"Gladiator Starring Iron Man"	April 26, 2016
2	"Pinocchio Starring Terminator"	May 26, 2016
3	"Aquaman v Superman"	August 2, 2016
4	"Home Alone Starring E.T."	December 6, 2016
5	"The Matrix Starring Forrest Gump"	February 15, 2017
6	"It Starring Jar Jar Binks"	November 30, 2017

==== James Covenant ====
No.	Title	Original upload date
1	"Silent Night by Chewbacca"	December 21, 2016
2	"Mary Poppins Starring Yondu"	December 5, 2017
3	"Avengers: Infinity War and Beyond Trailer (Toy Story Mashup)"	May 3, 2018

==== ByteSize Recaps ====
No.	Title	Original upload date
1	"The Last of Us"	June 16, 2020
2	"Pokémon Red and Blue"	July 30, 2020
3	"Batman: Arkham Asylum"	October 15, 2020

==== Others ====
No.	Title	Original upload date
1	"Tomorrowland – Minute Minecraft Parodies"	June 25, 2015
2	"BigHead Hunger Games Mockingjay Part 1"	November 18, 2015

=== HISHE Kids ===
HISHE launched an additional channel called HISHE Kids, with the show Fixed Fairy Tales.

==== Fixed Fairy Tales ====
Fixed Fairy Tales is an animated series that takes classic fairy tales and gives them a new twist. The stories are narrated by a talking owl named Vincent Featherbottom, who usually tells a summary to the actual story while pointing some flaws and starts to narrate his own version of the story.

No.	Title	Original upload date
1	"Humpty Dumpty"	January 13, 2015
2	"Little Red Riding Hood"	February 10, 2015
3	"Peter Piper"	March 10, 2015
4	"The Princess and the Pea"	April 15, 2015
5	"Goldilocks, The Gingerbread Man, and Little Miss Muffet"	June 9, 2015
6	"Three Little Pigs"	October 14, 2015

== Super Café / The Villain Pub ==
Super Café / The Villain Pub is a segment that debuted at the end of "How Superman Should Have Ended" which featured Superman discussing the alternate events of the 1978 Superman film in a café with Batman, which began the trend of Super Café. Though it is thought to be based on Seinfeld, the clips are actually based on the final scene of Daniel Baxter's favorite film, Swingers, with Superman standing in for Trent and Batman standing in for Mike. In various superhero episodes of How It Should Have Ended, altered or added scenes are shown from the superhero film, followed by the superheroes that appear in the film interacting with Batman and Superman (both voiced by Daniel Baxter) in the Super Café; it also always appears at the end of each episode (except the HISHE episodes for Sam Raimi's Spider-Man trilogy, which the café was only shown at the near beginning). The Super Café segment is featured in every superhero film the series has covered so far. Superman and Batman also make a brief appearance in a café in the "How Pulp Fiction Should Have Ended", thwarting Pumpkin and Honey Bunny's robbery attempt. The segment was also used in the Nostalgia Critic's review of Man of Steel. A companion segment called The Villain Pub which is modeled from Cheers and features many popular villains like Loki, the Joker, Voldemort, General Zod and many more began with "How Thor: The Dark World Should Have Ended". In those segments, Emperor Palpatine is the bartender, Bowser is the bouncer (bownser), Thanos is the janitor, HAL 9000 is the security system and Jaws is the executioner. The Cheers theme song was rewritten as a theme. There are numerous running gags in the Super Café segments, the most notable being in which Batman always explains his various accomplishments and abilities or finds some kind of excuse to say his catchphrase "Because I'm Batman!", much to Superman's irritation. In the HISHE episode for Suicide Squad, Batman discovers the Villain Pub and in The Villain Pub's episode "The Boss Battle", goes to confront the villains congregating there, nearly successfully, only to be tempted by Emperor Palpatine by his weakness – the ladies. It is then that Harley Quinn, who had used her vexing charms to be allowed back into the pub, knocks out Batman from behind. Batman is then taken into the cellar to be fed to the shark Jaws, who is comically depicted as talking in a high-pitched voice, chained up and stripped of his equipment. He barely escapes after being rescued by Dr. Strange, a fact that is reiterated in the HISHE episode for Doctor Strange (which also cryptically contained a spoiler for the Avengers: Infinity War trailer). Later, in the HISHE episode for Guardians of the Galaxy Vol. 2, things begin to take a turn for the dire when Ayesha, disgusted by heroes congregating in a café to meet, decides to punish superheroes whom she blames for her failure by destroying their café and unleashes her superweapon Martha (a parody of Adam Warlock, who was teased in the actual end-credits scene of Guardians of the Galaxy Vol. 2, and deliberately named to taunt both Batman and Superman for their mothers having the same name). The arrival of Martha to decimate the café is foreshadowed in further videos like the HISHE episodes for Wonder Woman, Spider-Man: Homecoming and Thor: Ragnarok. At last, in the HISHE episode for Justice League, Martha (voiced by James Rallison) arrives and succeeds in his primary objective of destroying the café but upon facing the Justice League, joined by Green Lantern, who comically resembles Steve Trevor, gets his neck snapped by Superman, much to the irritation of Batman, who had wanted to take down Martha through his own plan. The café is later rebuilt by Black Panther in the HISHE episode for Black Panther. In the HISHE episode for Deadpool, Deadpool gets himself bounced from both the Super Café and the Villain Pub. He gets bounced from the Super Café because he likes killing enemies like a villain, and from the Villain Pub because he is not evil enough to be allowed there. Deadpool cannot even swear at the pub, with his attempts being given bleep censors.

=== Super Café episodes ===
Stand-alone episodes of Super Café separate from the Super Café segments of How It Should Have Ended (HISHE) episodes. Note: Each episode features Superman and Batman.

No.	Title	Original upload date
1	"Super Social Network"	February 2, 2012
Batman and Superman discuss their repetitive status updates on Twitter.
2	"Bat Phone"	March 8, 2012
Superman tries to convince Batman to buy a smartphone.
3	"Bros Before Marios"	May 3, 2012
Nintendo video game character Mario tries to convince Superman and Batman that he, too, is a superhero.
4	"Pros and Cons"	May 7, 2012
Superman tries to convince Batman to go to Comic Con.
5	"Trailer of Steel"	December 20, 2012
Superman and Batman discuss the Man of Steel trailer.
6	"Swingers Tribute"	April 11, 2013
Superman attempts to flirt with Mrs. Incredible from afar.
7	"Versus"	July 30, 2013
Superman and Batman discuss possible titles for Batman v Superman, each title reflecting the heroes' opinions as to who could defeat whom in the proposed fight.
8	"Who's a Hero"	November 21, 2013
The Eleventh Doctor stops by the café to talk about the events in Doctor Who: The Name of the Doctor.
9	"And the Reboot Goes To"	March 3, 2015
After Hollywood slams superhero films for their repetitive formula, Superman and Batman discuss reboots.
10	"Batman v Superman – It's On!"	April 21, 2015
A Batman v Superman: Dawn of Justice trailer provokes conflict between Superman and Batman.
11	"Batman Go"	August 30, 2016
Superman's addiction to Pokémon Go annoys Batman, who then demonstrates Batman Go, an equivalent app that helps him hunt real criminals.: Note: The episode was later continued in "How Suicide Squad Should Have Ended", where Batman was hunting the Joker and Harley Quinn using his Batman Go app and in the end of the episode Batman tracked the Suicide Squad in the Villain Pub, leading to the events of The Villain Pub's "The Boss Battle" episode.
12	"The Last Trailer"	April 20, 2017
Superman and Batman get into conflict with the new Star Wars: The Last Jedi and Justice League trailer.
13	"Teens and Titans"	August 16, 2018
Following the release of Teen Titans Go! To the Movies, Batman rants about the film's cartoonish and silly nature and the inconsistency in tones between various DC films.
14	"Nostalgia Detective"	December 4, 2018
Superman and Batman discuss remakes and nostalgia with Detective Pikachu.
15	"Duh Plus"	November 12, 2019
Superman and Batman discuss DuhPlus.
16	"The Next Knight Rises"	February 25, 2020
After interrupting Batman's new suit teaser in the closet, Superman questions its appearance.
17	"Snyder Cut"	March 23, 2021
Batman and Superman react to Zack Snyder's Justice League amazingly.
18	"Let's-A Go!"	April 4, 2023
A certain Mario returns to the Super Café to hype up Batman and Superman about his big day.
19	"New Suit Jitters"	June 10, 2024
Superman is a little anxious about his new suit and the new reboot so Batman is offering him some pointers. Deadpool shows up with a little advice of his own.
20	"Deadpool & Wolverine Super Café"	October 3, 2024
When Deadpool creates a major alteration to the timeline, Batman and Superman are going to ask a lots of questions.: Note: The episode is a continuation of "How Deadpool & Wolverine Should Have Ended".
21	"I Have a Dog Now"	January 14, 2025
Krypto has joined the Super Café after the latest Superman trailer, while Batman is too busy to join the DCU.
22	"Avengers Doomsday Chairs – Super Cafe Reacts"	April 1, 2025
Batman and Superman react to the Avengers: Doomsday Casting Announcement chair live stream.
23	"Super Hearing Christmas"	December 16, 2025
On Christmas, Superman gets frustrated hearing the same song being played at stores all the time. So he and Batman face the music and find a severe solution to save Christmas.
24	"Obsession"	June 29, 2026
Batman discovers Nikki from Obsession, who is quite the catch and uses the power of a One Wish Willow to get her to fall for him. But seeing the danger Superman must confront Batman and his new wish-controlled girlfriend.

=== The Villain Pub episodes ===
Note: Each episode features patrons the Joker, (Note: Mostly The Dark Knight version.) Loki, General Zod, (Note: Mostly the DC Extended Universe version.) Lord Voldemort and bartender Palpatine. Some times janitor Thanos and Khan Noonien Singh make an appearance in some episodes.

No.	Title	Original upload date
1	"To Battle!!!"	June 4, 2014
After a bar fight between the Alien and the Predator gets out of hand (and they are thrown out by Bowser), Voldemort states that he is unhappy with the current state of "battles" among his villainous comrades, so he discusses the topic with the Joker and Khan.
2	"To the Tailor!!!"	September 11, 2014
Voldemort, the Joker and Loki discuss the importance of having a unique "look".
3	"The New Smile"	August 25, 2015
The Joker surprises everyone when he shows up at the Villain Pub with his new smile, tattoos and lack of eyebrows, and talks about his past looks, and why change is important. Voldemort remarks that his new look is hurting him "really, really bad" and General Zod exclaims that the Joker now looks like "a psychotic version of Jordan from My So-Called Life".
4	"Zombie Night"	August 29, 2015
Voldemort and the Joker debate on whether zombies (collective villains) should be counted as real villains or not when Khan shows up and joins their discussion (remarking that everyone seems like zombies to him). The episode ends with Voldemort and the Joker remarking that the Borg, the Cylons and the Cybermen are "basically robot zombies".
5	"The Boss Battle"	November 22, 2016
After the Suicide Squad are kicked out for saving the world, Batman enters the pub for The Villain Pub's Episode 5 and whenever a hero invades an enemy base, there is always a boss battle.
6	"Penny for Your Fears"	October 31, 2017
In 1989, Pennywise the Clown winds up in the Villain Pub.
7	"12 Days of Christmas"	December 13, 2017
The villains sing a parody of "The Twelve Days of Christmas".
8	"The Dead Pool"	April 23, 2018
The villains bet on how many heroes Thanos will kill in Avengers: Infinity War.: Note: The episode was later continued in the ending of "How Avengers: Infinity War Should Have Ended", where Thanos is defeated and Thor (who just stole the Infinity Gauntlet after cutting Thanos' arm) accidentally causes everybody in the Villain Pub to disintegrate into dust. At the last moment, Palpatine is forced to contact Deadpool to save the pub. The conclusion is later seen in the ending of "How Deadpool 2 Should Have Ended", where Deadpool receives Palpatine's message after failing to kill Ryan Reynolds, and then travels at time to steal Thanos' Gauntlet and is allowed to stay at the Villain Pub for a limited time, only to getting bounced from the pub again in latter episodes.
9	"Trick or Treat"	October 30, 2018
On Halloween, the villains discuss their opinions on the holiday while stealing candy from trick-or-treaters who arrive at the pub.
10	"Best Picture Summary (Oscars 2019)"	February 19, 2019
Thanos is dismayed that Avengers: Infinity War did not get nominated for Best Picture and the villains compare it to the other nominees.
11	"Return of the Palps (Star Wars Predictions)"	October 1, 2019
The villains discuss Palpatine's return to Star Wars.
12	"Palpatine's Quarantine"	April 2, 2020
In response to the COVID-19 pandemic, Palpatine closes the pub to enforce social distancing and tries to entertain himself during his quarantine.
13	"The Impostor (Among Us Parody)"	October 31, 2020
The villains play Among Us only to find themselves in a game-like situation.
14	"Into the Loki-Verse"	August 2, 2021
After the collapse of the Sacred Timeline, Loki discusses the Multiverse with the Villain Pub.
15	"Five Nights at Freddy's"	October 31, 2023
A stormtrooper must survive the night from Freddy Fazbear, Bonnie, Chica, and Foxy during their late night shift as Villain Pub security.
16	"A Despicable Quiet Place"	June 27, 2024
Fallout, The Last of Us, A Quiet Place – so many apocalypse stories! So what happens when the Ghoul, a Clicker and a Death Angel walk into the pub and what do the other villains think about them?

== See also ==
- CinemaSins
