= CinemaSins =

YouTube video producers

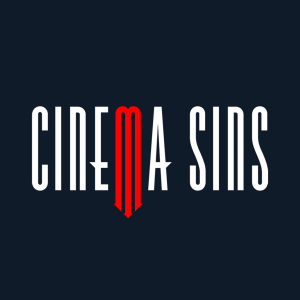
- CinemaSins logo (2012–2026)

YouTube information
- Channel: CinemaSins
- Years active: 2012–present (CinemaSins); 2015–2021 (Music Video Sins); 2014–2018 (Brand Sins); 2018–present (TV Sins); 2021–present (Commercial Sins)
- Genres: Film/Animation; Deadpan; Comedy
- Subscribers: 9.19 million (CinemaSins); 1.20 million (Music Video Sins); 507,000 (Brand Sins); 711,000 (TV Sins); 37,800 (Commercial Sins)
- Views: 4.04 billion (CinemaSins); 271+ million (Music Video Sins); 85.6+ million (Brand Sins); 68.6+ million (TV Sins); 963,000+ (Commercial Sins)
- Last updated: April 25, 2023
- Website: www.cinemasins.com

CinemaSins is a YouTube channel created by Jeremy Scott and Chris Atkinson. The channel produces the "Everything Wrong With..." series that offers critique and commentary on movies. As of November 28, 2025, CinemaSins has approximately 9,180,000 subscribers and over 4.0 billion video views. Its slogan is "No Movie Is Without Sin," indicating that even the greatest films ever made still have flaws. The channel's founders have since established a stand-alone website, CinemaSins.com, operating concurrently with the YouTube channel.

== History ==
Scott and Atkinson met in 1999 while working as managers at a movie theater and had a shared love for movies. Atkinson had worked at the theater since he was a teenager. The two began to preview new Friday releases the prior Thursday after the theater closed, and would criticize and crack jokes during the early showing. On May 9, 2011, they launched the YouTube channel "thecussingchannel" which contains supercuts of various films such as "Just the Cussing" for Pulp Fiction and "Just the Spells" for all 8 of the Harry Potter films, as well as four Apple ad parodies narrated by Scott. In addition to writing articles for ReelSEO, Scott founded the Internet marketing firm The Viral Orchard, and Atkinson wrote for his movie review blog.

On December 11, 2012, after a few unsuccessful channel attempts, they released "Everything Wrong With The Amazing Spider-Man In 2 Minutes Or Less", which garnered over 250,000 views in the first week partly due to a BuzzFeed post. Since then, they have consistently put out at least 2 "Movie Sins" videos each week, and now work full-time on the channel. In May 2014, Jeremy Scott started the channel CinemaSins Jeremy in which he makes videos detailing his thoughts and criticisms about trends in films and Hollywood news, as well as reviews and mashups. Two other spin-off channels featuring the Everything Wrong With... format have been launched.

In October 2014, Brand Sins was launched with content that criticizes companies, and in January 2015, Music Video Sins, with content revolving around complaints and inconsistencies in music videos. On January 9, 2016, CinemaSins started a podcast called The SinCast in which Scott, Atkinson and Barrett Share discuss various topics related to film and CinemaSins projects. In September 2018, TV Sins was created which focuses on highlighting errors in popular TV shows. In January 2021, Commercial Sins was created which focuses on highlighting errors in TV commercials. As of November 2026, the channel has amassed over 3 billion views and 9.17 million subscribers, and over 700 films (and over 2,000 episodes combined from all channels) were sinned.

== Video series ==
CinemaSins was launched on December 11, 2012, on YouTube, and uploaded their first two-minute long video titled "Everything Wrong With The Amazing Spider-Man" by Jeremy Scott. Due to the success, CinemaSins have released seven other series.

=== Everything Wrong With... ===
CinemaSins' main video series, Everything Wrong With..., explores complaints about a film's writing, acting, direction, production values, deus ex machina examples, clichés, plot holes, instances that defy logic and physics, factual errors, poor visual effects, derivative premises and other content that they deem "sins".

Most transgressions are awarded a single sin, but on occasion, more sins (as much as one billion, as seen in the Home Alone 2: Lost in New York episode, specifically during the cameo of Donald Trump) that appear to offend the narrator are awarded for effect. The climactic rescue scene in The Fate of the Furious disabled the sin counter and at least 161 sins were instead displayed as "R.I.P."; because of the damage, a 2.0 was used temporarily until the original counter was 'fixed' in Scream 2. However, there are times when sins are removed due to the presence of a scene which is considered exceptionally good, which makes up for the original sin (an exception was done during an April Fools episode in 2016 for the Troll 2 by removing a total of 10,000 sins before resetting to zero in the end). On two occasions (The Avengers and Doctor Strange), the sin counter additionally counted sins by mistake or added by the narrator. (Note: In a video for The Avengers, a technical counter error caused an extra sin to be added between the ninth and tenth sin, which ended up receiving 64 sins instead of 63.) (Note: In a video for Doctor Strange, a scene saw Jeremy adding five sins for himself for hilarity, but this was excluded from the final sin count.)

CinemaSins has been known to show great disdain for certain directors, such as Michael Bay, Roland Emmerich, McG, Joel Schumacher, Zack Snyder, and M. Night Shyamalan.

Each video begins with two taglines added on the film's title card ("In x minutes or less" [X is rounded up to the video's total minutes of runtime, excluding verdict, intro, bonus round and outtakes], and "Spoilers! (Duh)" [indicating the film's potential spoiler content] (Note: The very first video for The Amazing Spider-Man does not have the tagline; starting from The Avengers, the tagline was introduced and it had been used in every episode since. Beginning in Mulan (1998) (although some new videos still use the old title card and its "In x minutes or less" tagline), a new revised title card was used without the "In x minutes or less" tagline, and the film's title card was no longer full screen (reruns are not affected, however); the video title no longer states the rounded-up runtime, although the number is replaced by different cryptic depending on the film, first used in the film Zombieland.)); the video is then played with an on-screen "sin count" and "sin timer" (video runtime) throughout (with common expletives and profanities censored), and ends with a "verdict" for the film. The early videos usually featured generic verdicts like "Hell", though eventually, they came to employ words or phrases that refer to the film's content, such as lines of dialogue or settings, accompanied with audio samples or snippets to narrate the verdict. On rare occasions, a film will start with negative sins because of how good it is or because of a good decision early in the film, such as not overexposing the studios' logos. Frequently, the first sin listed is the total length of the logo sequences of the various production companies involved in the film, usually lampooning them as being too long. Usually, all of the sins are written by Scott and Atkinson; in one case, Iron Man 3's sins are described by the subscribers instead (Scott still did the video's narration and the bonus round).

Some videos feature a "bonus round", in which additional sins are added (removed, in the case of Deadpool and Deadpool 2) to the count for repetitive occurrences in the film. (Note: An exception was The Room, where four bonus rounds happen concurrently along with the episode (with 81 sins) instead of the end of the episode.) (Note: Not all episodes with a bonus round were shown on the actual YouTube video, and its patrons or subscribers-exclusive.) The sin count rarely reflects the reviewer's relative overall opinion of the film, so their true opinion is usually made clear in the video descriptions. Atkinson does most of the editing, while Scott narrates most of the videos, with the following exceptions:

- Atkinson narrated Prometheus on behalf of Scott;
- Canadian YouTuber Matthew Santoro narrated Underworld: Evolution;
- Nostalgia Critic's host Doug Walker narrated How the Grinch Stole Christmas!;
- Screen Junkies host Jon Bailey narrated Iron Man 3 and The Amazing Spider-Man 2 (the latter was a crossover, with Bailey narrating an "Everything Wrong With" video, while Scott did an Honest Trailers video);
- Astrophysicist and author Neil deGrasse Tyson narrated Gravity, Interstellar, and The Martian;
- Couch Tomato narrated the bonus round for Finding Dory ("20 Reasons Why Finding Nemo and Finding Dory are the Same Movie");
- Writer Ian Whittington narrated Supergirl and Minions & Monsters on behalf of Scott
- Producer Deneé Hughes narrated The SpongeBob Movie: Search for SquarePants on behalf of Scott

Each episode consists of one video playing about 15–20 minutes or more, but four episodes (Transformers: Age of Extinction, and all three films of the Star Wars prequel trilogy) were split into two parts due to video overruns; the Furious 7 episode was also split into two videos but had the audio outtakes separated into another video. Zack Snyder's Justice League's video was also split because of the 4-hour runtime, but unlike the first four instances, the film had two parts uploaded on two separate days (September 23 and 28, 2021), and a full version with the two parts combined was uploaded four days later on October 2. As of August 9, 2018, audio outtakes are now uploaded as a separate video starting with Cloud Atlas.

Certain stock criticisms are used as running gags, a number of which are ironic references to certain films, such as someone/something having "gone to the Prometheus School Of Running Away From Things" (used when one or more characters flee from a fast-moving or falling object in a straight line ahead instead of perpendicular to it to avoid the object completely), and "[Insert Character] would be excellent at CinemaSins" (used when a character mentions a would-be sin in a scene that would have already been counted as one by Scott had he said it instead), or "No one will be seated during the..." suggesting that a given scene is excessively boring or drawn out. Sometimes these criticisms are used in a doubly-ironic fashion within the very films that they reference, such as the alien characters in Signs being sinned for having "the same weakness as the aliens in Signs". Sometimes they allow Scott to be self-referential. For example, one stock criticism known as the "my college girlfriend" sin involves Scott making a reference to a sexual encounter he claims he had with a girlfriend while in college by commenting that a line said by a character in a particular scene was said by either himself or his girlfriend during that encounter. During every film made by a Comcast company, like Universal or DreamWorks, a "Comcast" sin is always played first. (Note: Except in Oppenheimer, where it was played second.) Whenever a film title is mentioned in a movie, "Roll Credits" (or its similar text) sin is played.

Family films tend to be less harshly criticized. For example, Megamind receives its share of sins, but they are delivered in a more lighthearted manner. However, one notable exception to this rule is films in the Despicable Me franchise, which have been sinned heavily due to the Minions characters featured in them, whom Scott perceives as highly irritating and thus a negative influence on the films' overall quality.

"Everything Wrong With" videos are typically uploaded every Tuesday and Thursday (with exceptions for every September since 2014, during which videos only upload on Tuesdays). Videos are selected and sinned, most commonly chosen by popular demand, though usually by at least one of the following reasons:

- A prequel film (or a series) to promote an upcoming film, usually sequels, and sometimes film reboots or remakes;
- An actor or director's prior film role in relation to the upcoming film;
- A seasonal-themed film to celebrate holidays; or any Academy Award-accolade film to promote the annual Academy Awards;
- A particular theme, genre or company in relation to an upcoming film;
- In rare cases, anniversaries for the film or a particular director/actor;
- Other reasons, through special cases if the aforementioned reasons do not fit in the criteria. (Note: Examples are Death Race 2000, where film director Roger Corman challenged CinemaSins to do one of his movies or Friday the 13th Part 2 due to the following day coinciding the Friday's superstition of October 13. The video for the television miniseries It breaks the trend on sinning films with the first part airing on CinemaSins and the second part on TVSins. In one case, Hobbs & Shaw was initially selected for the video on November 21, 2019, but was delayed until January 21, 2020, and was shortly replaced by another film Planet Hulk.)

When doing sins videos that are based on other media, such as books, television series or video games, CinemaSins normally never refers to the source materials on which the films are based, instead believing that the feature should stand or fall on its own merit. (Note: The two exceptions were Harry Potter and the Chamber of Secrets (the banner displayed "The books do not matter" during the video) and Dragonball: Evolution (a bonus round titled "The things that pissed off the fans of Dragon Ball" highlighted sins referring to the source material).)

Usually, at the end of a sins video, audio from other TV shows, films or songs with similar themes or motifs will be played over clips from the film. At times, they will also advertise other sponsored products like Audible, Nature Box, Crunchyroll, Squarespace and Scott's book The Ables, released on May 1, 2015.

Since September 2018, re-uploads of older episodes are found on YouTube, with some of the videos done by reworked sins, while the older uploads are removed.

=== Spin-off series ===
The success of CinemaSins has led to the production of four other spin-off channels under the "Everything Wrong With..." subtitle. On April 3, 2014, CinemaSins launched their Music Video Sins channel. On October 8, 2014, Brand Sins was launched. On September 4, 2018, a third spin-off channel, TVSins, featuring reviews of popular drama serials, was launched. On January 8, 2021, Commercial Sins was launched, featuring television commercials.

=== Conversations With Myself About Movies ===
In the Conversations With Myself About Movies series, Scott has a conversation with an edited-in version of himself about a movie. The "Conversations" videos also included clues as to the next "Sins" video, as well as a few red herrings.

=== Movie Recipes ===
Movie Recipes is a series that makes food that tastes "exactly like the movie", usually taking elements from the film and putting it into the recipe in different ways. The videos were put on hiatus with the final of the original entries being Scott's cameo in the Nostalgia Critic's review of A Christmas Story 2. The behind-the-scenes video showcasing the filming of the cameo featured Scott mentioning that the repulsive and possibly hazardous taste of the resultant foods was the reason he stopped making the videos. Scott retooled the series in March 2016, with dishes prepared by professional chefs instead.

=== What's the Damage? ===
What's the Damage is a video series where CinemaSins counts the actual cost of things damaged in a film, with the prices coinciding with their worth at the time of release.

== Podcast ==
CinemaSins Presents Sincast

Cast and voices
- Hosted by: Chris Atkinson Jeremy Scott Barrett Share

Publication
- No. of episodes: Regular: 285 as of 4 July 2021 Bonus: 138 as of 4 July 2021
- Original release: January 2016 — December 2025

On January 9, 2016, the podcast "Sincast, presented by CinemaSins" was launched. It is hosted by Scott, Atkinson, and Music Video Sins writer Barrett Share. Early episodes were about half an hour long, but since late 2016 most are around two hours long. The format has changed a few times since launch, but generally the trio discuss a larger topic for the greater part of the episode and then round off the episode by answering a couple of questions from listeners. Topics include discussion about upcoming movies, their favorite movies in different genres, stories from the host trio's time as movie theatre employees, and recasting classic movies.

On a few occasions the podcast has had a special guest, among them movie critic Aaron Dicer, storyboard artist Jeremy Simser, movie critic Jessie Maltin (daughter of Leonard Maltin) and the people behind the horror movie website Modern Horrors.

There is also the occasional "MiniPod", where the hosts review recently released high-profile movies, such as Batman v Superman: Dawn of Justice, Rogue One: A Star Wars Story, Get Out and Dunkirk. The first half of the episode is spoiler-free, whereas the other half contains spoilers to allow the hosts to go into deeper discussion about the movie.

In September 2017, Scott, Atkinson and Share appeared at the Wizard World Comic Con in Nashville and taped their first podcast in front of a live audience. Jason Mewes and Brian O'Halloran appeared as guests on the episode.

On May 16, 2019, CinemaSins announced that the podcast channel along with its archives can be listened and viewed on YouTube.

On December 13, 2021, Scott and Atkinson announced on the SinCast that Share had left CinemaSins to pursue other opportunities.

On November 24, 2025, Scott and Atkinson announced the podcast would end with the next episode. The final episode was released on December 01, 2025.

=== Special themes ===
In addition to the regular content consisting of news, rants, recommendations, warnings, and Q&A, some episodes will partially or entirely focus on a theme. These include:

- Theater Stories: Each regular host has experience working in movie theaters and these episodes focus on funny, bizarre, and entertaining stories from their time in the industry.
- Season Previews: Movies from upcoming months are discussed.
- Best Movie from Each Year You've Been Alive: Prompted from a question, this multiple-episode series included discussion on the different movies from the years the hosts have been alive, beginning with 1975. The hosts would conclude by voting with what they believe to be the best movie of the year to them resulting in a single movie by consensus.
- Movie Bracket: A multiple episode series inspired by the NCAA basketball tournament. The hosts use the winners and solid runners-up from the Best Movie from Each Year You've Been Alive to create a bracket of movies that would be paired with one another and the hosts voting on which movie would advance. No quantitative evidence is used, rather a simple in-the-moment feel from each host was used in their voting. This is not intended to be an all-inclusive list of best movies but rather intended as entertainment and discussion-inducing.
- Mount Rushmore: A multiple-episode series intended to identify the top-four of different topics in movies. The final voting often went beyond four and this series ended.
- Defining the Decade: A short multiple-episode series discussing the characteristics and movies of the past decades beginning with the 1970s.
- Cinematic Road Trip: A multiple-episode series in which the hosts and guests discuss movies set in and/or filmed in different states of the United States.

=== Behind The Sins ===
CinemaSins Presents Behind The Sins

Cast and voices
- Hosted by: Aaron Dicer Denee' Hughes Jonathan Watkins

Publication
- No. of episodes: 108 as of 4 July 2021
- Original release: June 2019

On June 27, 2019, the podcast "Behind The Sins, presented by CinemaSins" was launched. It is hosted by Aaron Dicer, Denee' Hughes & Jonathan Watkins. The first few episodes were just over an hour but succeeding episodes quickly went out to around the two-hour mark.

== Reception ==
CinemaSins has attracted criticism from several filmmakers, including Rian Johnson (Looper), Damon Lindelof, C. Robert Cargill (Doctor Strange), David F. Sandberg (Shazam!), and Jordan Vogt-Roberts (Kong: Skull Island). The filmmakers assert that the channel largely fails as genuine criticism because of its excessive and trivial nitpicking, lack of understanding of the filmmaking process, and its often mean-spirited, reductive nature; as Vogt-Roberts put it, "these guys are just trolling the art form we love and profiting from it while dumbing down the conversation." YouTuber Bobvids created a series of videos criticizing specific videos of the series as well as the motivations for the series itself, ranging from specific rebuttals to sweeping.

Jeremy Scott has claimed that the series is not supposed to be entirely serious in terms of criticism and that most of his nitpicks are intended as comedy; in their response on June 7, 2013, Scott uploaded "Everything Wrong With CinemaSins", a self-parodying sins video that pokes fun at filmmakers and commenters who have disliked the channel as well as poking fun at the hosts themselves explaining that their videos are filled with sarcasm. The video was set as the channel's preview page and, as of April 9, 2023, went on to become their most-watched video at 30 million views; a sequel of the video was made and released on May 7, 2019, and replaced the channel preview video on May 17, 2019.

On October 10, 2015, Scott created a video on his personal channel, regarding Screen Junkies and their new series "The Review Crew", alleging plagiarism of his own review format at the time due to similarities. After both CinemaSins and Screen Junkies received backlash from each other's fans, Scott deleted the video and posted an apology on Twitter the following day. Screen Junkies apologized as well and subsequently cancelled the series.

The CinemaWins channel was created by a different team as a response to CinemaSins, with the Hidden Remote blog saying that it "playfully pinpoints what movie makers got right as oppose to the mass critics who often pompously (and very subjectively I might add) damn many good and underrated movies for minor flaws".

== CinemaSins Response Channels ==
A number of film criticism YouTube channels are devoted (in whole or in part) to making response videos to CinemaSins. (Something CinemaSins has even acknowledged.)

== See also ==
- How It Should Have Ended (HISHE)
- Honest Trailers
- Every Frame a Painting
