= You Deserve a Drink =

2015 memoir by Mamrie Hart

- Author: Mamrie Hart
- Language: English
- Publisher: Plume
- Publication date: May 26, 2015
- Publication place: United States
- ISBN: 9780142181676
- OCLC: 2092782789
- Website: www.ydadbook.com

You Deserve a Drink: Boozy Misadventures and Tales of Debauchery is a memoir and cookbook written by YouTube personality and comedian Mamrie Hart. The book was published by Plume and released on May 26, 2015.

== Plot ==
The book details humorous anecdotes and stories of Hart's life, with a cocktail recipe accompanying each chapter.

== Critical reception ==
You Deserve a Drink was generally well-received by reviewers. Writing for The New York Times, actor and comedian Michael Ian Black stated that "Hart is a pull-no-punches comedian with a talent for self-deprecation in the guise of self-aggrandizement, a winning formula."

Colleen Stinchcombe, writer for She Knows said that "She is undeniably a funny lady, and her humor translates beautifully — even more powerfully, I'd argue — to the page. Her jokes have more time to build, her punchlines land harder. She's created an entirely hilarious read that will delight her current fans by giving them a pitcher-sized serving of her normally shot-sized jokes and entice new readers who have enjoyed recent books by other humor heavy-hitters."

The book won a Streamy Award in 2015 in the "Writing" category.
