= Devin Graham =

American videographer (born 1983)

- Born: July 29, 1983 (age 43)
- Other name: devinsupertramp
- Occupation: Content creator
- Spouse: Megan Smee (m. 2016)

YouTube information
- Channel: devinsupertramp
- Years active: 2010–present
- Genres: Extreme sport; Cinematography
- Subscribers: 6.42 million
- Views: 1.88 billion
- Last updated: November 15, 2025
- Website: Official website

Devin Graham (born July 29, 1983) is an American videographer who produces adventure and extreme sport videos on YouTube under the name devinsupertramp. His channel has more than 6.42 million subscribers and over 1.8 billion total views.

== Career ==
Graham began making films of his stunts snowboarding at an early age. After breaking his back and legs snowboarding, he shifted his focus to being behind the camera. He studied film making at Brigham Young University with the original intent on working on feature films. After seeing the successes of YouTube videos, specifically one made on a cellphone that amassed over two million views, Graham opted to focus on making videos of his own rather than completing his degree.

Graham mostly produces, films, and edits his videos on his own. In a number of occasions, Graham has stated that he's worked with his roommate Jeff Harmon, others for sound, and cameramen if required. In Logan, Utah, he recruited 30 fan volunteers to help him shoot a snowball fight after making a public appeal on Facebook.

Graham's YouTube channel has more than six million subscribers and his videos have amounted to over a billion views as of April 2021. His videos are noted for their high production value and frequent use of Glidecam stabilizers. Some of his revenue comes from corporate sponsorships for his videos; which have included the clothing brand Vooray, Timex, Kelloggs, Bear Naked, Mountain Dew, Ford, Ubisoft, and Reebok, as well as Speed Stick Gear. Graham won a Streamy Award for cinematography in 2015 at the 5th Streamy Awards.

== Personal life ==
For a short time he dated fellow YouTube celebrity Lindsey Stirling; they both attended the same university and church. The two began dating shortly after the filming of the music video for Stirling's "Crystallize". They have since ended their relationship, but still remain friends.

Graham also dated Hailey Gardiner from the singing group Gardiner Sisters. "Happily Ever After", a song from their EP, Better, was written by Hailey in reference to the dissolution of their relationship.

Graham married Megan Smee on August 12, 2016. In November 2019 Megan and Devin's son, Atlas Michael Graham, was born.
