= Matthew Santoro =

Canadian YouTuber (born 1985)

- Santoro in 2025
- Born: July 16, 1985 (age 41); Ontario, Canada
- Education: Brock University (MAcc)
- Occupations: YouTuber; educator; streamer

YouTube information
- Channel: Matthew Santoro
- Years active: 2010–present
- Genres: Educational; comedy; vlog
- Subscribers: 5.95 million
- Views: 1.52 billion
- Last updated: May 3, 2025
- Website: www.matthewsantoro.com

Matthew Santoro (born July 16, 1985) is a Canadian YouTuber, live streamer, and educator. He creates top ten lists and "50 Amazing Facts" videos. Santoro previously produced vlogging and gaming videos, which are no longer available.

As of November 2025, Santoro's channel has 5.91 million subscribers and 1.5 billion views.

== Channel history ==
Santoro most frequently uploads top ten lists, such as "10 Forbidden Places You’re Not Allowed to Visit!" and "10 Extremely BIZARRE Phobias People Actually Have!".

== Personal life ==
Santoro grew up in Welland, Ontario, and later moved to St. Catharines, Ontario. He is of Italian descent through his father, while his mother is French-Canadian. In May 2015, he moved to Toronto, Ontario. A fan of Drake and hip-hop culture, Santoro often refers to Toronto as "The 6ix".

In January 2016, he uploaded a video titled My Abuse Story. He tearfully talked about an unnamed romantic partner, whom he claimed was manipulative and forced him to turn his friends and family away in favour of her and she had also psychologically and physically abused him during their relationship. It was claimed by his friend, Rob Gavagan (né Dyke), that the "unnamed partner" mentioned in the video was Nicole Arbour.

Santoro moved to Los Angeles in the first week of January 2017 and possesses a U.S. green card, but maintained his Canadian citizenship.

On October 21, 2017, Santoro released a video revealing that he has clinical depression. Santoro made several videos afterwards explaining his progress and improvements.

On July 27, 2020, Santoro explained that after moving back to Toronto, someone or some group stole a trailer from the moving company that housed most of his belongings, leaving him nothing other than what he had moved back to Toronto with himself. The stolen trailer was found on July 30, and its contents were returned to Santoro on July 31, although some items were still missing, and several were damaged.

Santoro is a Christian. He briefly discussed his journey to faith in a video uploaded on November 13th, 2025.

== Career ==
After Santoro graduated from Brock University with a Master of Accountancy in 2010, he became an accountant. He also started making videos on YouTube that year, mostly skits. In 2012 he got laid off from his accounting job. He described that experience in a vlog titled "I Lost My Job Today". He then started focusing on his YouTube career and thus began posting videos weekly. Also during this time, he recalls in an interview, that he noticed that his opinionated fact compilation videos, such as his top ten lists and "50 Amazing Facts To Blow Your Mind" series, were viewed more than his other videos. That made him begin uploading those types of videos more frequently. He believes that his more frequent uploading of these videos helped increased his viewership from only a few thousand per video in the past, to the millions he currently has. He is able to make a career out of YouTube through the money he earns from ad revenue, which is more than what he made as an accountant.

In a tweet published on August 15, 2021, Santoro announced that he was leaving YouTube after 10 years of uploading, in favor of streaming on Twitch.

In December 2022, Santoro announced his return to YouTube.

=== Notable collaborations ===
Santoro has been a special guest narrator on CinemaSins' Everything Wrong With... series. He was featured in the Underworld: Evolution video which was published on October 10, 2014. He also collaborated with Matthias, creating a song, "The Booty Song", and Barely Political in their video, "YouTube Complaints 2015". Santoro and Vsauce3 collaborated with The Muppets, in a video titled, "What if Quicksilver Ran Past You?", which was the first video in the Muppet collaboration initiative on YouTube.

He collaborated with Lilly Singh, Olga Kay, Toby Turner, and Arnold Schwarzenegger, among others, in Terminator Genisys: The YouTube Chronicles, a promotional series for the 2015 film Terminator Genisys.

In July 2018, Santoro released the 100th episode of his "50 Amazing Facts" video series; for the occasion, Santoro had each fact presented by a different YouTuber. Those who took part included Rhett and Link, Kanwer Singh, Daym Drops, MatPat, Hank Green, iJustine, and the Fine Brothers.

== Other work ==
Santoro is the host of Quest Nutrition's "Food for Thought" webseries. The first episode, "10 Incredible Facts About Chicken", premiered on May 28, 2015.

Santoro, along with Yousef Saleh Erakat, Soledad O'Brien and will.i.am hosted the Global Citizen 2015 Earth Day event. On September 26, 2015, Santoro, along with AsapScience, Stephen Colbert and Hugh Jackman hosted the Global Citizen festival.

In June 2015, Santoro obtained a global publishing deal from Penguin Books for his book, titled MIND=BLOWN, which was released on August 9, 2016.

Santoro retired with the title of #1 "most loved" Periscoper in the world with over 177 million hearts on the live streaming app Periscope on November 11, 2015.

== Awards and nominations ==
| Year | Award | Category | Result |
|---|---|---|---|
| 2015 | Seventh Annual Shorty Awards | YouTube Star of the Year presented by A&E | Nominated |
| 2015 | Fifth Annual Streamy Awards | Breakout Creator | Won |
