= Rahat Hossain =

YouTube prankster

- Born: December 19, 1989 (age 36); Virginia Beach, Virginia, U.S.
- Occupations: YouTube personality; magician

YouTube information
- Channel: MagicofRahat
- Years active: 2007–2018; 2020-2024
- Genres: Magic; comedy; pranks
- Subscribers: 7.32 million
- Views: 1.56 billion
- Last updated: June 29, 2026

Rahat Hossain (born December 19, 1989), also known by his username MagicofRahat, is an American YouTube personality, vlogger, and prankster who produces pranks and magic tricks on YouTube. As of November 2026, Hossain's YouTube channel has amassed over 7.3 million subscribers, and over 1.5 billion views.

== Early life ==
Hossain's parents are from Bangladesh. He was born and grew up in Virginia Beach, where he showed passion for building things with cardboard and duct tape. Hossain attended Old Dominion University in approximately 2009, majoring in criminal justice . In college, he began uploading videos featuring card tricks. The first video uploaded on his YouTube account was titled "Maxi-Twist by Rahat". He uploaded almost 50 videos of this genre before filming hidden camera pranks. He would be inspired by other YouTubers and improve on them, He would upload videos of himself doing something another youtuber had already done before him, but improve the showmanship in his own way.

== Career ==
=== Driver drive thru pranks ===
Hossain posted his hit video, "Drive Thru Invisible Man Prank," on January 9, 2013. The video shows him dressed up as a car seat and fooling workers at various fast food restaurants, such as McDonald's and Chick-fil-A. Hossain said he constructed the car-seat outfit in 12 hours after being inspired by an image he found on the Internet of a "guy who'd actually had a car-seat costume similar to what I built".

The prank gained immense popularity and was featured on Fox & Friends, Good Morning America, and The Ellen DeGeneres Show, among others. As of 2014, the video received over 40 million total views.

In June 2014 Toyota featured Hossain in a similar invisible driver stunt in Europe, steering the Toyota Aygo.

=== Homeless lottery winner ===
On March 4, 2014, Hossain uploaded a video titled "Homeless Lottery Winner" in which he pranked a homeless man named Eric Aursby. Hossain was inspired by Chris Russell's video titled "Homeless Lottery Winner" uploaded on March 2, 2014. The video begins with Hossain explaining to the viewers his intention to help Aursby, who was described to Hossain by members of the community as a "nice and respectable guy". Hossain would give him a losing lottery ticket that the store clerk of a nearby convenience store (who was in on the prank) would exchange for $1,000 cash, giving Aursby the impression that he had won the lottery. Immediately after receiving the money, Aursby began insisting on splitting the "prize" with Hossain and subsequently broke down in tears when Hossain declined.

In the following weeks, Hossain uploaded another video in which he discussed the overall response to the lottery ticket prank, with viewers (who were touched by Aursby's gesture to offer half of the money to Hossain) asking how they could donate to Aursby. Hossain set up a fundraiser, with the initial goal being to raise a total of $20,000. The fundraiser ended up more than tripling this amount and collected roughly $66,000 from over 3,000 donors. Hossain remarked that he wanted to "improve his lifestyle", emphasizing Aursby's personality. While collecting the money, Aursby moved into a hotel room and was given a job at a 7-Eleven via a friend. However, Hossain would later reveal that Aursby never showed up for work, telling Hossain that he "didn't feel like it". On May 7, 2014, Hossain uploaded a video to YouTube titled "Homeless Man Gets A Home". The video shows Hossain offering to buy Aursby dinner, but that he has to stop by his house to get something. At the house, Hossain reveals that the house is not actually his, but rather Aursby's new home, which was later revealed to be paid for by thousands of Internet contributors. In a matter of days, the video received about 9 million views.

In February 2018, a video was posted containing a new interview of Aursby, who claimed that he did not have access to the money and the house needed constant maintenance. He also alleged that he had not received any of the money raised from the fundraiser, he only stayed in the house from Hossain's second video for two months rather than a year and sometime after Aursby left, the house was sold for $61,000 ($5,000 less than the amount raised in the fundraiser). Hossain responded on June 5, 2018, in a since-deleted Twitter post stating that the money was indeed transferred to Aursby and that he would provide bank statements to prove his innocence.

In June 2018, Aursby stated he no longer wanted the money from Hossain and forgave him for his actions. However, in a July 2018 interview, Aursby again accused Hossain of keeping most of the money from the fundraiser.

=== Return to YouTube ===
On August 3, 2020, a YouTube channel called JayLaw made a documentary about Hossain's "disappearance" from social media and YouTube. In the documentary, he investigates what actually happened to Hossain and the false scandal surrounding him and Eric. He also ended up contacting Trey, Hossain's ex-cameraman, where he confirms Hossain's innocence, as Trey himself was also part of the ''Homeless Lottery Winner'' and "Homeless Man Gets A Home" and confirmed Hossain is still around.

On November 18, 2020, Hossain returned to YouTube, ending his hiatus since the beginning of 2018. Hossain described his side of the story and the personal struggles he faced dealing with the aftermath of the "scandal". Hossain left the question about his return to YouTube unanswered and uncertain, explaining that his personality had completely changed and that he had been diagnosed with depression because of the false scandal. He also proceeded to show all of the evidence of him giving money to Eric, hence showing that Eric had been lying the entire time.

In January 2021, Hossain uploaded a new drive-thru prank video featuring the Star Wars character Grogu, beginning his return to the platform as confirmed by his Twitter and his YouTube channel. Beginning on January 6, 2021, and up until January 12, 2024, Hossain continued to post prank videos on YouTube, but has since not uploaded any new videos.

== Personal life ==
Along with business partners, Hossain started a coffee shop business in Newport News, Virginia, called "Canvas Coffee House", which opened in 2019. The coffee house changed ownership in September 2023 with a Jane Austen theme - while some partners pivoted to focus on coffee roasting.
