= Arden Rose =

American actress

- Born: Arden Rose Ricks; May 3, 1995 (age 31); Arkansas, U.S.
- Occupations: YouTuber; vlogger; actor; author

YouTube information
- Channel: Arden Rose
- Years active: 2009–present
- Genre: Vlogs
- Subscribers: 1.54 million
- Views: 154 million
- Last updated: August 4, 2026

Arden Rose Ricks (born May 3, 1995) is an American actress, author, and internet personality.

== Personal life ==
Arden was born on May 3, 1995 in Arkansas. She has been in a relationship with British YouTuber Will Darbyshire since 2015. They became engaged in September 2021 and were married on May 23, 2024, in Chippenham, Wiltshire.

== Acting ==
Arden starred as Hadley Pulito on Mr. Student Body President, which was produced by New Form, and aired on go90 in the United States and Channel 4 in the UK.

Arden also starred in season 2 of AwesomenessTV's Guidance on go90 in 2016.

== Books ==
Rose's debut book Almost Adulting was released by HarperCollins in March 2017.
