= Fight of the Living Dead =

American reality-styled web series (2015–2017)

- Genre: Reality-styled drama; Web series
- Directed by: Kevin Abrams; Michael Shea
- Country of origin: United States
- Original language: English
- No. of seasons: 3
- No. of episodes: 21

Production
- Executive producers: Kevin Abrams; Jamie Denenberg; Tony E. Valenzuela; Rodney Frazier; Aaron Lewis
- Producers: Yehuda Duenyas; Bret Warren
- Production locations: Los Angeles, California
- Running time: 21–38 minutes
- Production companies: Alpine Labs, LLC; Revolver Picture Company

Original release
- Network: YouTube (2015); YouTube Premium (2016–2017)
- Release: April 5, 2015 – December 7, 2017

Fight of the Living Dead is an American reality-styled streaming television series in which YouTubers participate in a simulated zombie apocalypse and attempt to survive for 72 hours. The series premiered on April 5, 2015, on YouTube, with later seasons airing on YouTube Premium.

The first installment, Fight of the Living Dead: Live-Action Video Game, was a six-episode pre-season totaling under one hour combined. It was produced before the show's partnership with YouTube Premium and starred Jesse Wellens, Meghan Camarena, Iman Crosson, Joey Graceffa, Justine Ezarik, Jeana Smith, Jarrett Sleeper, Sam Pepper, and Olga Kay.

== Seasons ==
| Season | Title | Premiere date | Episodes | Platform |
|---|---|---|---|---|
| Pre-season | Live-Action Video Game | April 5, 2015 | 6 | YouTube |
| 1 | Experiment 88 | August 17, 2016 | 7 | YouTube Premium |
| 2 | Paradise Calls | October 31, 2017 | 8 | YouTube Premium |

== Premise ==
The series follows well-known YouTubers who are placed in an experiment conducted by a fictional organization called CONOP. The organization has developed a biological weapon that reanimates the dead, transforming them into zombies. Contestants are placed in areas where zombies are known to be present and must work together to complete missions and survive a 72-hour period. Each episode chronicles the events that transpire during this timeframe. Throughout their stay, contestants encounter various characters with unknown purposes and intentions.

== Missions ==
In each episode, CONOP instructs one or more subjects via a communications room or through radio while outside the safe house to complete missions. These tasks may lead to encounters with zombies and potential elimination. Subjects either decide as a group who will undertake missions or are nominated directly by CONOP. A mission is deemed complete when the primary objective is fulfilled.

== Contestants ==
=== Live-Action Video Game ===
| Name | Age | Channel | Entered | Result |
|---|---|---|---|---|
| Jesse Wellens | 32 | Jesse | Episode 1 | Winner |
| Meghan Camarena | 27 | Strawburry17 | Episode 2 | Eliminated (Episode 6) |
| Iman Crosson | 33 | Alphacat | Episode 2 | Eliminated (Episode 6) |
| Joey Graceffa | 23 | Joey Graceffa | Episode 1 | Eliminated (Episode 6) |
| Justine Ezarik | 31 | iJustine | Episode 1 | Eliminated (Episode 5) |
| Jeana Smith | 32 | BFvsGF | Episode 2 | Infected (Episode 5) |
| Jarrett Sleeper | 29 | Jarrett Sleeper | Episode 3 | Infected (Episode 4) |
| Sam Pepper | 26 | Sam Pepper | Episode 2 | Infected (Episode 2) |
| Olga Kay | 32 | Olga Kay | Episode 1 | Infected (Episode 1) |

=== Experiment 88 ===
| Name | Age | Channel | Result |
|---|---|---|---|
| Rahat Hossain | 26 | MagicofRahat | Winner |
| JC Caylen | 23 | Jc Caylen | Winner (revived) |
| Tré Melvin | 23 | Tré Melvin | Eliminated (Episode 7) |
| Brandon Bowen | 18 | Brandon Bowen (Vine) | Eliminated (Episode 7) |
| Raya Moab | 23 | GirlGoneGamer | Eliminated (Episode 7) |
| Yousef Erakat | 26 | fouseyTUBE | Eliminated (Episode 6) |
| Vitaly Zdorovetskiy | 24 | VitalyzdTv | Infected (Episode 4) |
| Shanna Malcolm | 34 | Shanna Malcolm | Eliminated (Episode 3) |
| Dennis Roady | 33 | howtoPRANKitup | Infected (Episode 2) |
| Brittani Louise Taylor | 32 | Brittani Louise Taylor | Infected (Episode 1) |

=== Paradise Calls ===
| Name | Age | Channel | Entered | Result |
|---|---|---|---|---|
| Jake Paul | 20 | Jake Paul | Episode 1 | Winners |
| Miles Jai | 24 | MilesJaiProductions | Episode 1 | Winners |
| Hannah Stocking | 25 | Hannah Stocking | Episode 1 | Eliminated (Episode 8) |
| Juanpa Zurita | 21 | Juanpa Zurita | Episode 1 | Eliminated (Episode 8) |
| Eric Ochoa | 31 | SUPEReeeGO | Episode 3 | Eliminated (Episode 7) |
| Wendy Ayche | 31 | Wengie | Episode 1 | Eliminated (Episode 7) |
| Ken Walker | 23 | Who is Ken | Episode 1 | Infected (Episode 6) |
| Karina Garcia | 23 | Karina Garcia | Episode 1 | Eliminated (Episode 5) |
| Anwar Jibawi | 26 | Anwar Jibawi | Episode 1 | Infected (Episode 5) |
| Anthony Trujillo | 21 | Chance and Anthony | Episode 1 | Eliminated (Episode 3) |
| De'arra Taylor | 21 | De'arra Taylor | Episode 1 | Eliminated (Episode 2) |

== Progress charts ==
=== Live-Action Video Game ===
| Contestant | Episode 1 | Episode 2 | Episode 3 | Episode 4 | Episode 5 | Episode 6 |
|---|---|---|---|---|---|---|
| Jesse | Safe | Safe | Safe | Safe | Safe | Winner |
| Meghan | — | Safe | Safe | Safe | Safe | Eliminated |
| Iman | — | Safe | Safe | Safe | Safe | Eliminated |
| Joey | Safe | Safe | Safe | Safe | Safe | Eliminated |
| Justine | Safe | Safe | Safe | Safe | Eliminated | |
| Jeana | — | Safe | Safe | Safe | Infected | Zombie |
| Jarrett | — | — | Safe | Infected | Zombie | |
| Sam | — | Infected | | | Zombie | Zombie |
| Olga | Infected | | | | | Zombie |

=== Experiment 88 ===
| Contestant | Episode 1 | Episode 2 | Episode 3 | Episode 4 | Episode 5 | Episode 6 | Episode 7 |
|---|---|---|---|---|---|---|---|
| Rahat | Safe | Safe | Safe | Safe | Safe | Safe | Winner |
| JC | Safe | Safe | Safe | Infected | | | Winner |
| Tré | Safe | Safe | Safe | Safe | Safe | Safe | Eliminated |
| Brandon | Safe | Safe | Safe | Safe | Safe | Safe | Eliminated |
| Raya | Safe | Safe | Safe | Safe | Safe | Safe | Eliminated |
| Yousef | Safe | Safe | Infected | Zombie | Revived | Eliminated | |
| Vitaly | Safe | Safe | Safe | Infected | | | Executed |
| Shanna | Safe | Safe | Eliminated | | | | |
| Dennis | Safe | Infected | | | Zombie | Zombie | |
| Brittani | Infected | | | | | | Executed |

=== Paradise Calls ===
| Contestant | Episode 1 | Episode 2 | Episode 3 | Episode 4 | Episode 5 | Episode 6 | Episode 7 | Episode 8 |
|---|---|---|---|---|---|---|---|---|
| Jake | Safe | Safe | Safe | Safe | Safe | Safe | Safe | Winner |
| Miles | Safe | Safe | Imprisoned | Safe | Safe | Safe | Safe | Winner |
| Hannah | Safe | Safe | Safe | Safe | Safe | Safe | Safe | Eliminated |
| Juanpa | Safe | Safe | Safe | Safe | Safe | Safe | Safe | Eliminated |
| Eric | — | — | Imprisoned | Safe | Safe | Safe | Eliminated | |
| Wengie | Safe | Safe | Safe | Safe | Safe | Safe | Eliminated | |
| Ken | Safe | Safe | Safe | Safe | Safe | Infected | | Zombie |
| Karina | Safe | Safe | Imprisoned | Safe | Eliminated | | | |
| Anwar | Safe | Safe | Imprisoned | Safe | Infected | | Zombie | |
| Anthony | Safe | Safe | Eliminated | | | | | |
| De'arra | Safe | Eliminated | | | | | | |

Winner Safe Eliminated/Infected Revived Appeared as zombie Did not appear Had not yet entered Fate determined at episode's end Imprisoned

== Winners ==
| Season | Winner(s) |
|---|---|
| Live-Action Video Game | Jesse Wellens |
| Experiment 88 | Rahat Hossain and JC Caylen |
| Paradise Calls | Jake Paul and Miles Jai |

== Notes ==
- Jesse Wellens and Jeana Smith, who competed together in the pre-season, ended their relationship in May 2016 and subsequently operated separate channels.
- In the finale of Live-Action Video Game, Meghan Camarena was eliminated due to a production error in which a zombified Olga Kay accidentally opened a car door in an earlier shot, preventing Meghan from entering the vehicle.
- In Experiment 88, JC Caylen was voted by fellow contestants to be "revived" and rejoin the game after his elimination, chosen over Brittani Louise Taylor and Vitaly Zdorovetskiy.

== See also ==
- I Survived a Zombie Apocalypse
