= Deal with It (TV series) =

- Genre: Game show; Hidden camera; Comedy
- Presented by: Theo Von
- Country of origin: United States
- Original language: English
- No. of seasons: 3
- No. of episodes: 28

Production
- Executive producers: Howie Mandel; Mike Marks; Mike Harney; Roy Bank
- Running time: 20–23 minutes
- Production companies: Alevy Productions; Alternative Plan; Keshet Broadcasting; United Studios of Israel; Lionsgate Television; Banca Studio

Original release
- Network: TBS
- Release: July 17, 2013 – December 19, 2014

Deal with It is an American comedy television game show series that debuted on July 17, 2013 on TBS. The series features stand-up comic Theo Von, as he and a guest comedian dare people to pull pranks on the public. On August 20, 2013, TBS renewed Deal with It for a 12 episode second season. Season 2 premiered on March 19, 2014. On May 22, 2014, TBS renewed Deal with It for a 10-episode third season, which premiered on October 24, 2014. The Deal with It format was created by Israeli production company Keshet Broadcasting and has been sold 14 times.

== Series overview ==
Season	Episodes	Originally released	
Season	Episodes	First released	Last released
1	6	July 17, 2013	August 21, 2013
2	12	March 19, 2014	June 4, 2014
3	10	October 24, 2014	December 19, 2014

== Episodes ==
=== Season 1 (2013) ===
No. overall	No. in season	Title and guests	Original release date	Prod. code	U.S. viewers (millions)
1	1	RC Chaos in Hotel (Yvette Nicole Brown and Howie Mandel)	July 17, 2013	101	2.01
2	2	Shirts Off (Joan & Melissa Rivers and Mel B)	July 24, 2013	102	1.91
3	3	The Cult (Bobby Lee and Alex Mandel)	July 31, 2013	103	2.03
4	4	Hypnotist (Josh Gad and Heidi Klum)	August 7, 2013	104	1.75
5	5	Blind Rose (Adam Carolla and Alex Mandel)	August 14, 2013	105	1.82
6	6	Nut Job (Joan & Melissa Rivers and Bobby Lee)	August 21, 2013	106	1.93

=== Season 2 (2014) ===
No. overall	No. in season	Title and guests	Original release date	Prod. code	U.S. viewers (millions)
7	1	Nick Cannon and Howie Mandel	March 19, 2014	201	1.78
8	2	Heidi Klum, Roman Atwood, and Dennis Roady	March 26, 2014	202	1.57
9	3	Tom Green and Iliza Shlesinger	April 2, 2014	203	1.39
10	4	Kendall & Kylie Jenner and Gary Owen	April 9, 2014	204	1.11
11	5	Chris Jericho and Bill Engvall	April 16, 2014	205	1.28
12	6	Arsenio Hall and Alex Mandel	April 23, 2014	206	1.18
13	7	Bob Saget and Chuey Martinez	April 30, 2014	207	1.04
14	8	Howie Mandel and Kevin Nealon	May 7, 2014	208	N/A
15	9	Kelly Osbourne and Moshe Kasher	May 14, 2014	209	1.52
16	10	David Koechner and Alex Mandel	May 21, 2014	210	1.30
17	11	Bill & Giuliana Rancic and Alex Mandel	May 28, 2014	211	1.11
18	12	Tom Green and The Miz	June 4, 2014	212	1.28

=== Season 3 (2014) ===
No. overall	No. in season	Title and guests	Original release date	Prod. code	U.S. viewers (millions)
19	1	Howie Mandel and Nick Cannon	October 24, 2014	301	N/A
20	2	Ross Mathews and Bobby Lee	October 31, 2014	302	N/A
21	3	Jerry O'Connell and Jeannie Mai	November 7, 2014	303	N/A
22	4	Kym Whitley and Josh Wolf	November 14, 2014	304	N/A
23	5	King Bach and Alex Mandel	November 21, 2014	305	N/A
24	6	Howie Mandel and Jack Osbourne	November 28, 2014	306	N/A
25	7	Penn Jillette and Jessimae Peluso	December 5, 2014	307	N/A
26	8	Chuey Martinez and Josh Meyers	December 12, 2014	308	N/A
27	9	Melissa Peterman and Sarah Colonna	December 19, 2014	309	N/A
28	10	Marlon Wayans and Mo Mandel	December 19, 2014	310	N/A

== International versions ==
Country	Title	Presenter(s)	Network	Originally aired
Brazil	Faça & Disfarça (part of O Melhor do Brasil)	Rodrigo Faro	RecordTV	2012
Canada	Deal With It	Sandy Jobin-Bevans; Martin Roach	W	2012–2013
Germany	Iss oder quizz	Lutz van der Horst; Senna Gammour	ZDFneo	March 21, 2011 – April 16, 2012
Greece	Πλάκα Κάνεις; Pláka Káneis	Dimitris Vlachos; Savas Poumpouras	ANT1	2011
Israel (original version)	נראה אותך; Nir'eh Ot'kha	Shai Goldstein; Avi Nussbaum; Adi Ashkenazi	Channel 2	2010–2015; 2021
Italy	Deal With It - Stai al gioco	Gabriele Corsi	NOVE	October 14, 2019 – June 10, 2022
Mexico	Vas con todo	Cecilia Galliano; Bazooka Joe	Canal 5	January 19, 2020 – March 20, 2020
Slovenia	Znajdi se!	Mario Ćulibrk	Planet TV	2019
Spain	Sígueme el Rollo	Sara Escudero	Ten	September 26, 2016 – October 25, 2016
