= Roman Atwood =

American YouTube personality (born 1983)

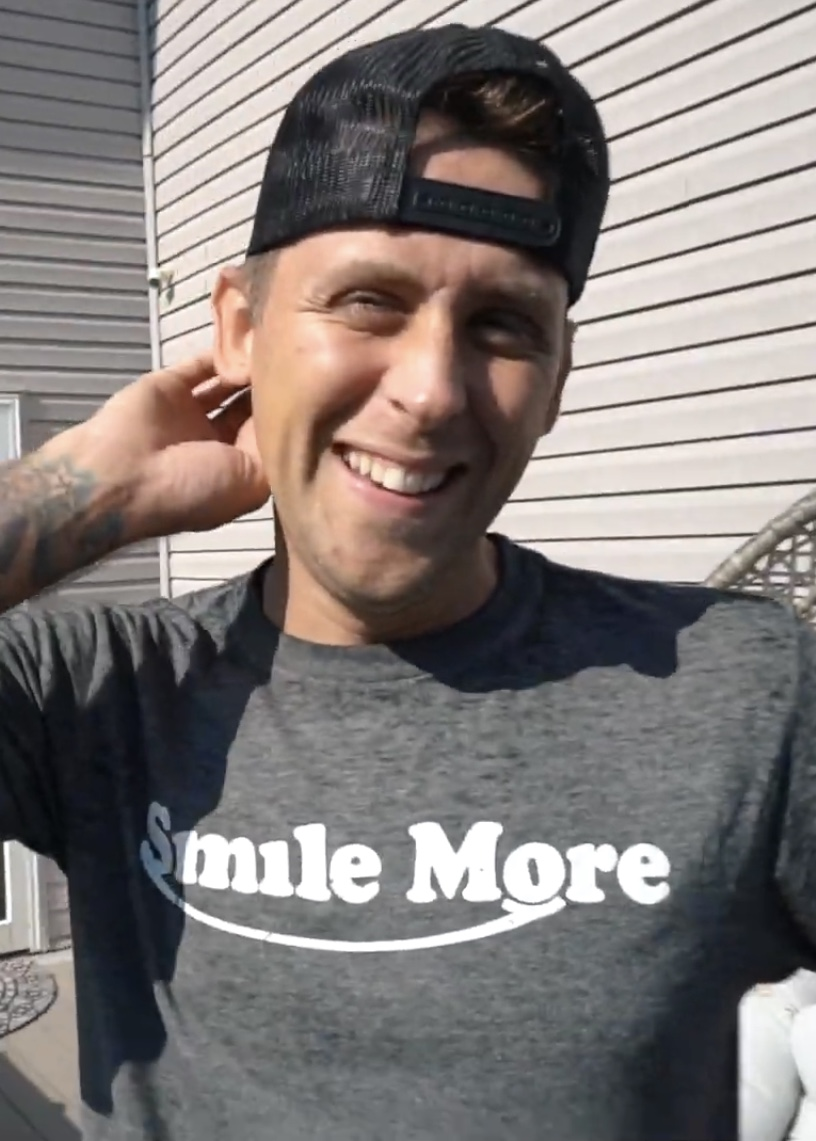
- Atwood in 2019
- Born: Roman Bernard Atwood; May 28, 1983 (age 43); Millersport, Ohio, U.S.
- Occupations: YouTube personality; comedian; vlogger
- Spouses: Shanna Riley (m. 2001; div. 2008) Brittney Smith (m. 2018)
- Children: 4

YouTube information
- Channels: RomanAtwoodVlogs; RomanAtwood; RomanAtwoodPodcast
- Years active: 2009–present
- Genres: Family; inspiration; comedy; pranks
- Subscribers: 15.1 million (RomanAtwoodVlogs); 10 million (RomanAtwood); 524 thousand (RomanAtwoodPodcast)
- Views: 5.57 billion (RomanAtwoodVlogs); 1.564 billion (RomanAtwood); 59.5 million (RomanAtwoodPodcast)
- Last updated: January 2, 2026
- Website: romanatwood.com

Roman Bernard Atwood (born May 28, 1983) is an American YouTube personality and prankster. He is best known for his vlogs, where he posts updates about his life. His vlogging channel, "RomanAtwoodVlogs", has a total of 5 billion views and 15 million subscribers. He also has another YouTube channel called "RomanAtwood", where he used to post prank videos. The channel has been inactive since 2016. His pranks have gained over 1.4 billion views and 10.4 million subscribers. He became the second YouTuber after Germán Garmendia to receive two Diamond Play Buttons for his first two channels.

On May 28, 2022, he officially launched his third channel, "RomanAtwoodPodcast". The channel is focused around his podcast where he features numerous friends and special guests, such as Steve-O, Vitaly, and FouseyTube.

He is also a board game designer, having created a game called "War and Pieces" back in 2016.

== Personal life ==
Born in Millersport, Ohio, Atwood has been filming and producing videos since high school. He was born to Curt Dale Atwood and Susan Atwood. He began his independent career by producing a series of DVDs called "The Nerd Herd" which he sold at the Warped Tour in 2006. Atwood has also worked on various film projects and commercials in Columbus, Ohio until 2010, when he decided to focus on his passion of comedy and created the YouTube channel "Sketch Empire".

Prior to his YouTube career, he worked at his family's rope factory called "Atwood Rope". In 2001, he married Shanna Riley, who gave birth to Atwood's first son, Noah Vaughn Atwood (born 2004). In 2008, after his wife cheated on him with a friend while on vacation, he filed for a divorce.

In 2013, Atwood founded his own merchandise line called "Smile More", selling T-shirts, hoodies, bracelets and other items.

He currently resides in Ohio with his wife Brittney Smith-Atwood, with whom he shares two sons, Kane Alexander Atwood (born 2011), Knox Atwood (born 2021), and a daughter, Cora Atwood (born 2017). Atwood met Smith in 2008 at the wedding of his friend, Chase Gilroy, where Atwood was the best man. Smith is the sister of Gilroy's wife, Veronica, and the two started dating from there. Atwood proposed to Smith on April 30, 2018, and the two married on July 27, 2018, in Maui, Hawaii.

On May 29, 2019, Atwood's mother, Susan Atwood, died unexpectedly after a tragic accident while on vacation with the entire Atwood family. Atwood subsequently took time out from his social media activity to grieve for his mother.

After uploading a video on New Year's Eve of 2019, Atwood underwent a large period of inactivity on social media for an undisclosed reason. He uploaded a video on August 18, 2020, in which he greeted his fans and stated that while he could not disclose the reason for his absence, he wanted to reassure fans that he and his family were okay, and that several conspiracy-style videos that had been uploaded by fans and content creators to YouTube discussing his absence were all inaccurate. Two days later on August 20, the Atwoods revealed that they were expecting a fourth child, though they added it was not the reason for their absence.

On January 11, 2021, Atwood uploaded a video titled "Welcome to the world!" in which he and Brittney revealed that their son, Knox Atwood, was born five days earlier on January 6, weighing in at just under 9lbs.

Atwood is a member of the Church of Jesus Christ of Latter-day Saints.

== Career ==
=== YouTube ===
==== Plastic Ball Prank ====
In this video, Atwood fills his house with plastic balls 2.5 ft high, turning it into a massive ball pit. This video was uploaded on January 18, 2015, and as of May 2026, has around 92 million views. This video was noticed by Nissan, who gave him a 2015 Nissan GTR in exchange to use his video in the "WithDad" campaign during their half-time advert at Super Bowl XLIX. This was awarded the best "Brand Campaign" for the 5th Streamy Awards.

==== Anniversary Prank ====
His video "Anniversary Prank Backfires!!" was posted on November 20, 2013, and as of May 2026, has around 94 million views. It features Atwood pranking Smith on their five-year dating anniversary by confessing that he has cheated on her. The prank backfires when she sees the camera beforehand and pranks him back by pretending that she has cheated on him too. She only reveals her own prank after a few seconds of Atwood reacting badly to the news.

==== Killing My Kid Prank ====
A prank titled "Killing My Own Kid PRANK!!", posted on November 30, 2014, and as of May 2026, has around 58 million views. The video shows Atwood pranking Smith by throwing a mannequin in a Spider-Man costume, pretending it was their son Kane. When Smith runs to the mannequin, she quickly pulls off its mask, realizing it was not Kane, and in fact a mannequin. The prank was referenced during Atwood and Smith's appearance on the reality TV series Tanked, where Smith revealed that Atwood did in fact sleep on the couch that night.

==== ATM prank and freedom of expression case ====
In March 2014, Roman, along with his accomplices, were arrested by the Columbus Police Department for inducing panic and disorderly conduct during the filming of a prank where he pretended to rob an ATM in public. He was released on bail and was summoned to court. The case was widely contested, with his fans showing up to court to support and watch the case. As a defendant, he won the case on the basis of expression of art and freedom of speech, and was acquitted.

==== Toilet Paper Prank ====
A video titled "INSANE Toilet Paper PRANK!!" was posted on March 15, 2015, and as of May 2026, has around 20 million views. The prank features Atwood toilet papering Howie Mandel's house with the help of Mandel's son, Alex.

Later, Mandel discussed the prank on an episode of Jimmy Kimmel Live! and his experience with his son and the clean up.

=== Film ===
==== Natural Born Pranksters ====
In 2016, Atwood, Vitaly Zdorovetskiy and Dennis Roady released a film produced by Lionsgate, called Natural Born Pranksters which has received little critical attention. Neither Rotten Tomatoes nor Metacritic have yet aggregated enough reviews to even give the film a score.

On September 24, 2016, the film was released on Netflix.

=== Television ===
==== Tanked ====
On July 1, 2016, Atwood and his family appeared on an episode of Tanked titled "Internet Tank Sensation". The episode features Brett and Wayde building a customized tank in Atwood's office for Smile More.

=== Tour ===
In 2016, Atwood and fellow YouTuber Yousef Erakat started a worldwide tour called "Roman vs. Fousey". They have performed shows in the United States, Canada and the UK.

== Business career ==
=== Smile More ===
In 2013, Atwood founded his own merchandise line called "Smile More", selling T-shirts, hoodies, bracelets and other items. At the time, merchandise was handled exclusively by Atwood and his wife, with orders being processed in their basement.

In 2016, Atwood moved the business to its own building located on the same property as his residence. Atwood hired more employees, some of which were family, to help process orders faster and in-house.

On May 7, 2022, Atwood posted a video to his vlog channel announcing that Smile More would be moved entirely to Texas in a collaboration with longtime friend and business partner, Matt Carriker, and his company, Bunker Branding. It was also announced that Atwood and his wife would take part ownership of Bunker Branding.

==== NFTs ====
On October 26, 2021, Atwood announced the first NFT of his Smile More collection on OpenSea. The collection was made collaboratively with multiple artists.

=== Bunker Branding ===
On May 7, 2022, following the announcement of Smile More's move to Texas, Atwood announced that he and his wife would be taking part ownership of longtime friend Matt Carriker's company, Bunker Branding.

== Awards and nominations ==
Year	Work	Category	Award	Result	Ref.
2014	Roman Atwood	Pranks	4th Streamy Awards	Nominated	
2015	Crazy Plastic Ball Prank #WithDad, Roman Atwood (Nissan)	Brand Campaign	5th Streamy Awards	Won	
2016	Roman Atwood	YouTube Comedian	8th Shorty Awards	Won	
2016	Roman Atwood	Entertainer of the Year	6th Streamy Awards	Nominated	
