= Here's the Deal =

Here's the Deal may refer to:

- Here's the Deal (album), 2000 acid jazz album by Liquid Soul
- Here's the Deal: A Memoir, 2022 autobiography by Kellyanne Conway
- Here's the Deal: Don't Touch Me, 2009 autobiography by Howie Mandel
