= Bullsh*t: The Game Show =

2022 American game show

- Genre: Game show
- Created by: Jonty Nash; Christopher Potts
- Written by: Kyle Beakley; John Chaneski; Amy Ozols; Todd Sachs
- Directed by: Alan Carter
- Presented by: Howie Mandel
- Country of origin: United States
- Original language: English
- No. of seasons: 1
- No. of episodes: 10

Production
- Executive producers: David Friedman; David Eilenberg; Jonty Nash; Christopher Potts; Simon Thomas
- Producers: Bri Baxter; Olivia Bonin
- Editors: John Baldino; Brennan Gerjarusak; Gasper Chiramonte; Alyssa Dressman; Glenn Ebesu; Nick Gagnon; Dmega HSU, ACE; Jason Stewart; Tim Sullivan; Jimmy Tartanella; Robby Thompson
- Production companies: ITV America; Nobody's Hero

Original release
- Network: Netflix
- Release: April 27, 2022

Bullsh*t: The Game Show is an American television game show hosted by Howie Mandel on Netflix that released on April 27, 2022. This was Mandel's first game show since the cancellation of the Deal or No Deal revival back in 2019.

== Premise ==
In the game, players work their way up a money ladder either by answering questions correctly or confidently giving incorrect answers and persuading their opponents that they are correct. For each question answered correctly (or successfully lied through), the contestant moves up the money ladder, closer to the final prize of $1,000,000.

== Gameplay ==
After a contestant chooses an answer, only the contestant is shown if it was correct or not. The player then tells a story about how he or she supposedly knew the answer, even if it is not correct. Three judges decide whether they believe their story or if they think the contestant is lying (referred to as "bullshitting" by Mandel and the participants). When this concludes, the contestant is asked to confirm if their answer is correct, or if they were lying. If the contestant was right, the game continues without issue. But if they're wrong, they may only proceed if at least one judge was convinced that they were correct. If all three judges correctly accuse the contestant of lying on the same question, the contestant is eliminated and the game ends. The contestant then receives the amount of money equivalent to the last safe haven they reached and departs the show, while the judge who was most accurate in assessing whether they were lying or telling the truth becomes the next contestant.

== Reception ==
Melissa Camacho of Common Sense Media gave the show 3 out of 5 stars calling it a fun game show, praised Mandel's humor hosting, and the cliffhangers in each episode, claiming it to "make it easy to binge watch", though she did mention that the word "bulls--t" being used a lot in the show may be unsettling for younger viewers.
