= Natural Born Pranksters =

- Directed by: Ben Pluimer; Roman Atwood
- Written by: Roman Atwood; Dennis Roady; Vitaly Zdorovetskiy
- Starring: Roman Atwood; Dennis Roady; Vitaly Zdorovetskiy
- Production companies: Studio71; Collective Digital Studios
- Distributed by: Lionsgate
- Release date: April 1, 2016
- Running time: 90 minutes
- Country: United States
- Language: English
- Budget: $1,000,000 (estimated)
- Box office: $315,672

Natural Born Pranksters is a 2016 American comedy film starring YouTuber celebrities Roman Atwood, Dennis Roady, and Vitaly Zdorovetskiy. Their film debut features the trio staging pranks that were too elaborate to put on YouTube. The film was produced by Collective Digital Studios and distributed by Lionsgate. The trio wrote the feature and it was directed by Ben Pluimer and Atwood, in his directorial debut. The film also has numerous cameos by social-media personalities including Jenna Marbles, Furious Pete, Jukka Hildén, Dave England and Tom Mabe.

== Plot summary ==
The film is a series of stunts and pranks pulled on unsuspecting victims. Some of the pranks include, but not limited to: pulling a sexually themed prank on masseurs, attempting to convince critics a painting made of fecal matter is real art, pretending to get third-degree burns at a tanning salon, pretending to kill dogs in the kitchen of a Chinese restaurant. They scared sunbathers on a Miami Beach by dropping a realistic looking plastic snake in the sand, had eating contests, shot each other with confetti cannons and jolts from electric fly zappers. In one elaborate stunt, they convinced a pregnant wife to prank her husband by pretending she had given birth to an African-American baby, neither the husband nor wife was African-American. They also staged murders and alien abductions. The film also featured clips from their YouTube channels.

== Cast ==
- Roman Atwood
- Dennis Roady
- Vitaly Zdorovetskiy

Cameos

- Dave England
- Kevin Brueck
- Furious Pete
- Jukka Hildén
- Tom Mabe
- Jenna Marbles
- Brittney Atwood
- Radio DJ Big Boy

== Production ==
The process of writing and developing the pranks and stunts for the film took two years, and it was filmed in 30 days. In addition, they had guest writers from Punk'd helping them advance concepts. Atwood said they developed 400 pranks overall, but only ended up using about 32 in the movie. The trio had to get their pranks approved by the legal department and insurance providers, with their lawyers telling them "no a lot" for some of their stunts. None of the pranks featured in the film were safe for YouTube, as they violated the terms of service of the video platform. Hidden cameras were used with men in disguises, pretending to be homeless pushing a cart and dads pushing strollers. Police officers traveled with them to defuse situations where the person being pranked was upset and wanted to call the police.

The three have also faced physical confrontations sometimes with their pranks. Roady recalled an incident in Finland, where the prank was kidnapping a woman in front of a group of people, putting her into the trunk of a car, and was confronted "by a guy", and his "nose got cracked". In another stunt involving a car enthusiast, he caught them trying to siphon gas from his car and took off his belt and swung it at them, nearly missing the three. In 2014 Zdorovetskiy created headlines when he streaked across the field of the 2014 FIFA World Cup Final in Rio de Janeiro, with the words “Natural Born Pranksters” written across his chest.

== Reception ==
Katie Walsh of the Los Angeles Times was highly critical of the film saying "In borrowing the model of Jackass and Punk’d, this “film” lacks the essential DNA of what made those shows appealing...these pranksters...aren't nearly so generous, and their sadistic stunts display a deep mean-spirited streak, resulting in racist, sexist and homophobic harassment. UK based Vulture Hound wrote "The intro sequence is brief, high octane and fun, giving the audience a taster of what’s to come...the pranks are of expected viral quality - invasive, boundless and some are downright extreme, exactly what made them infamous...ultimately, the film falls victim to its own ambition and slips into monotonousness in the effort to remain shocking, avant-garde and interesting. Through the quest to include more and more great content, it becomes a hindering overload.

The Irish World website wrote: "the movie is obviously trying to tap into the loyal and engaged fan base of YouTube stars...but the non-stop gags get a bit tedious after a while, and maybe that’s why the mischievous stars have enjoyed so much success in the one-off short video market on the video sharing platform...there are several laugh-out-loud moments at the expense of the prank victims, but perhaps this movie is best left for teenage boys who will undoubtedly love the toilet humour and silly gags. Jennie Kermode at EyeForFilm.co.uk wrote that the movie is "hit and miss...it's a good first effort for an amateur team and parts of it work very well indeed...it has done well in linking its sketches together and creating the sense of momentum necessary to sustain this sort of thing in the cinema, but the sketches themselves are not all strong enough to work for what's likely to be a tougher audience. Its natural home is on DVD where is can be watched in fragments, much like the original show".

== Release ==
The film was released on iTunes, theatrically in limited markets, and via DVD. On its opening weekend, the feature was number one on iTunes in comedy and ranked number two overall on the video on demand platform. In the international market, it was in the top 10 of 18 territories, with the United Kingdom, Denmark and Norway being the top markets. Domestic video sales for the film were $315,672

On September 24, 2016, the film was released on Netflix.

== See also ==
- List of YouTubers
- List of practical joke topics
- DM Pranks
- Jackass
