= Dennis Roady =

American YouTube personality (born 1983)

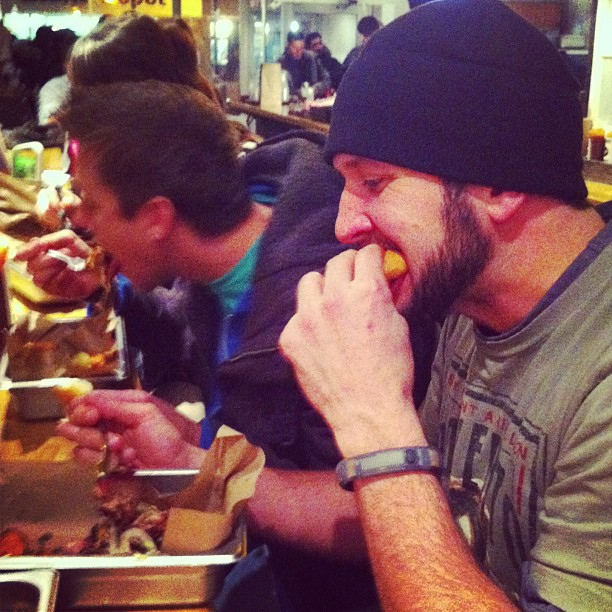
- Roady in Montreal, Canada
- Born: Dennis Darrell Roady; June 6, 1983 (age 43); Wiesbaden, Hesse, West Germany
- Education: Franklin University
- Occupation: YouTube personality
- Years active: 2012–present
- Children: 1

YouTube information
- Channels: howtoPRANKitup; Dennis Roady Games; Dennis Roady
- Genres: How-to, pranks, vlogs
- Subscribers: 2.94 million (howtoPRANKitup); 178 thousand (Dennis Roady Games); 937 thousand (Dennis Roady)
- Views: 597 million (howtoPRANKitup); 6.25 million (Dennis Roady Games); 85.9 million (Dennis Roady)
- Last updated: May 3, 2025
- Website: www.prankkits.com

Dennis Darrell Roady (born June 6, 1983) is an American YouTube personality best known for his Internet-posted pranks and his association with YouTubers Roman Atwood and Vitaly Zdorovetskiy, leading to starring in the feature film Natural Born Pranksters. He hosts the YouTube channels Dennis Roady Deeds and howtoPRANKitup. He is a cast member of the web series Fight of the Living Dead: Experiment 88, in which 10 YouTubers are placed in a zombie apocalypse scenario. Prior to YouTube, Roady served in the U.S. Army for 10 years.

== Filmography ==
=== Television ===
Year	Title	Role	Notes
2016	Fight of the Living Dead: Experiment 88	Himself	Web series, Cast member

=== Film ===
Year	Film	Role	Notes
2016	Natural Born Pranksters	Himself	
