= The Howie Mandel Show =

- Genre: Talk show
- Written by: Vic Cohen; Howie Mandel; Michael Platt; Robert Raymond; Hal Spear; Rob Young
- Presented by: Howie Mandel
- Country of origin: United States
- Original language: English
- No. of seasons: 1

Production
- Executive producers: Howie Mandel; Joachim Blunch; Michael Rotenberg
- Production locations: NBC Studios; Burbank, California
- Running time: 60 minutes (with commercials)
- Production companies: 3 Arts Entertainment; Alevy Productions; Paramount Domestic Television

Original release
- Network: Syndicated
- Release: June 22, 1998 – April 1999

The Howie Mandel Show is an American television variety show hosted by comedian Howie Mandel. The series was launched in daytime syndication on June 22, 1998, and ran for approximately a year before it was canceled in April 1999.

== Background ==
The Howie Mandel Show was taped at NBC Studios in Burbank. The show recorded in Studio 1, which was the same studio Johnny Carson taped The Tonight Show in. Paramount Domestic Television served as distributor.

Mandel's show had an in studio band led by Steve Goldstein, referred to on air as the Studio One Band. Mandel would often banter with Goldstein during the opening to the show, which always consisted of a brief monologue by the host. Two celebrities were usually featured along with a musical guest.

Mandel's first guest was Jennifer Aniston. Jay Leno also appeared on the premiere to wish Mandel luck.

The program also featured up and comers as musical acts. For instance, a young Britney Spears made her first performance appearance on Mandel's show in early 1999.

Despite all this, the show never drew well in the ratings and Paramount pulled the plug nine months later.

Throughout its run, the series was rated TV-PG, primarily due to the fact that Mandel frequently used the word "penis" on air; a running gag in the series was that Mandel and his guests were allowed to freely use the word.

One of the show's recurring segments lived on since its cancellation. Mandel would often take hidden cameras with him wherever he would go, and those segments eventually led to a recurring Tonight Show spot called "Hidden Howie" and the TV series Howie Do It.
