= Tanked =

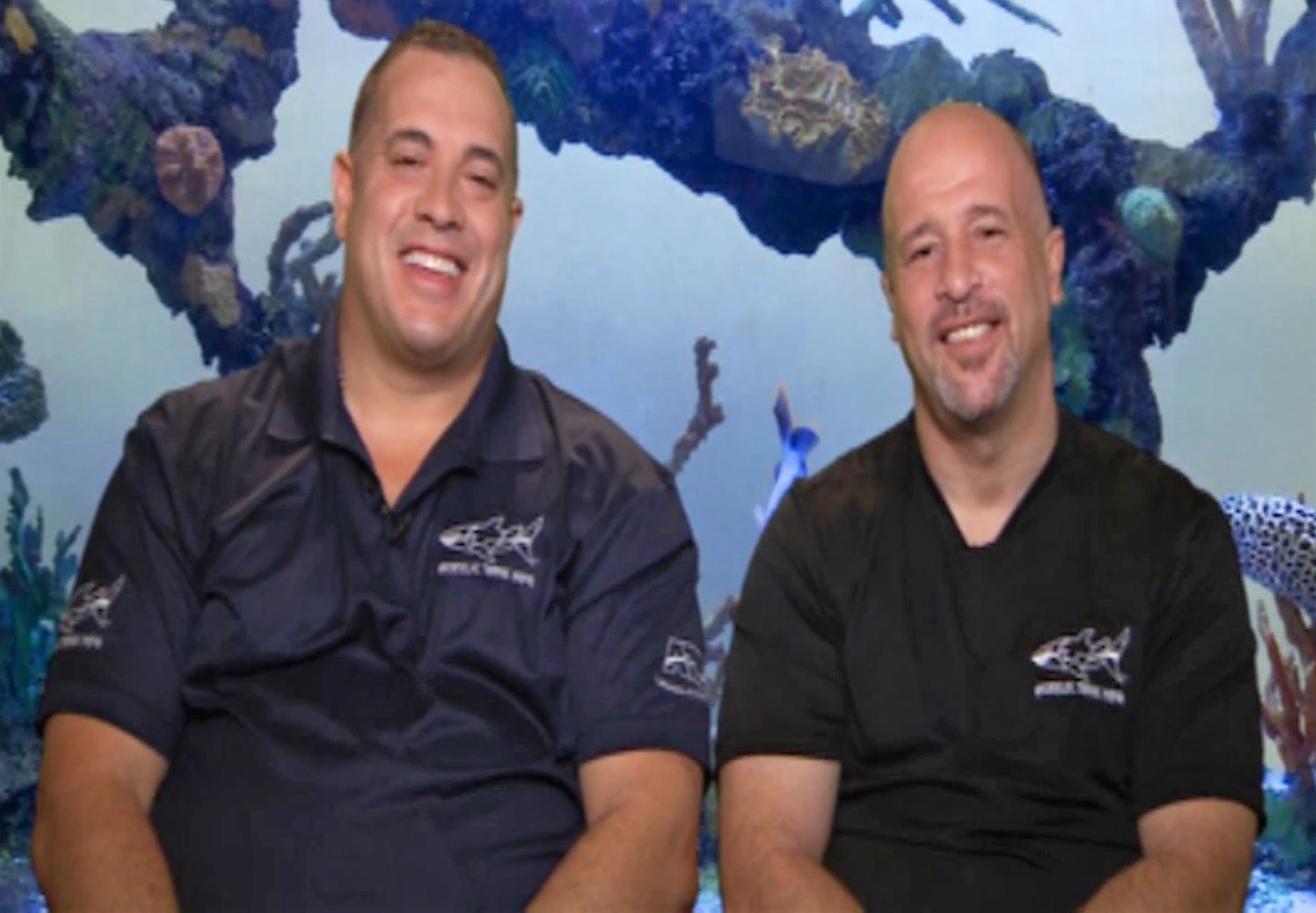
- Wayde King and Brett Raymer discuss Tanked in 2014
- Also known as: Tanked: Unfiltered
- Genre: Reality
- Starring: Wayde King; Brett Raymer
- Country of origin: United States
- Original language: English
- No. of seasons: 15
- No. of episodes: 153 (including 8 specials)

Production
- Executive producers: Nancy Glass, Eric Neuhaus and Matt Carter
- Producer: Pat Dempsey
- Running time: 42–43 minutes

Original release
- Network: Animal Planet
- Release: August 7, 2011 – December 28, 2018

Tanked is an American reality television series that aired on Animal Planet from August 7, 2011, to December 28, 2018. The series followed the operations of the Las Vegas-based aquarium manufacturer Acrylic Tank Manufacturing, owned by brothers-in-law Brett Raymer and Wayde King. Brett's sister Heather, married to Wayde, is the company's accountant, and Heather and Brett's father Irwin Raymer (also known as The General) is the office manager.

Other regulars include shop manager Robert "Robbie Redneck" Christlieb and sales coordinator Agnes Wilczynski.

In 2012, Animal Planet re-released the entire series with additional text commentary from the cast under the name Tanked: Unfiltered. New episodes were shown on Fridays at 10pm Eastern Time. On March 17, 2018, Animal Planet announced that the series would end after the fifteenth season. Tanked was also shown on the DMAX channel in the United Kingdom.

== Series overview ==
Season	Episodes	Originally released	
Season	Episodes	First released	Last released
1	6	August 7, 2011	September 16, 2011
2	8	April 14, 2012	June 9, 2012
3	7	August 11, 2012	November 17, 2012
4	11	March 22, 2013	June 7, 2013
5	6	August 2, 2013	September 13, 2013
6	6	November 1, 2013	December 12, 2013
7	11	March 7, 2014	May 16, 2014
8	14	September 19, 2014	January 16, 2015
9	16	May 29, 2015	January 1, 2016
10	10	April 16, 2016	July 1, 2016
11	9	September 23, 2016	November 18, 2016
Specials	8	December 9, 2016	March 10, 2017
12	10	April 21, 2017	June 30, 2017
13	10	October 6, 2017	December 15, 2017
14	11	March 31, 2018	June 8, 2018
15	10	November 2, 2018	December 28, 2018

== Episodes ==
=== Season 1 (2011) ===
No. overall	No. in season	Title	Original release date	Prod. code
1	1	"Brett Takes a Dive"(Pilot episode)	August 7, 2011	101
Brett builds a car theme tank in record time, and Brett is nervous to use his new scuba skills.
2	2	"Swimming with the Sharks"	August 19, 2011	102
Wayde and Brett try to avoid sleeping with the fishes when they design a 1,000 US gal (3,785 L), mob-inspired tank. Meanwhile, Wayde's wife, Heather, is persuaded to walk among sharks; and the Acrylic Tank Manufacturing team works on a phone-booth aquarium for a homesick New York family.
3	3	"Rules of Engagement"	August 26, 2011	103
A hydraulic tank gives a business a boost and comes with a hidden engagement ring; a diner owner wants a tank to go with the restaurant's decor.
4	4	"Be Cool"	September 2, 2011	104
The finishing touches are put on a 57,000 US gal (215,768 L) aquarium in a Dallas megachurch; a woman surprises her fiancé with a beer-keg tank for his basement hangout; Brett makes unauthorized enhancements to a lawyer's reception-desk tank.
5	5	"Good Karma"	September 9, 2011	105
A request for a precisely constructed Feng Shui tank helps Brett discover his zen, unlocking the gateway for inner peace and outward annoyance to his fellow ATM crew. Meanwhile, an overhead bed boat tank, custom themed after a well-known children's book, brightens the spirits of a five-year-old boy with many surgeries ahead of him. Brett and Wayde are brought to tears by the gratitude of the little boy, who couldn’t dream of anything more. Finally, a visit to the Atlantis Aquarium tank allows big payback as Heather gets her revenge by secretly signing Brett and Wayde up for a caged shark dive.
6	6	"Tricks of the Trade"	September 16, 2011	106
A skateboard ramp tank has Wayde & Brett grinding their gears to find a solution to keep the acrylic from scratching; The ATM team builds a surprise octopus tank for Wayde's birthday; and Vegas weather is threatening a meltdown on an outdoor gumball tank.

=== Season 2 (2012) ===
No. overall	No. in season	Title	Original release date	Prod. code
7	1	"Fish Out of Water"	April 14, 2012	201
Wayde and Brett are back home in New York to see a long-time client to discuss the installation of a shark tank for his recently built orthodontist office; a display tank for an appliance store.
8	2	"Old School vs. New School"	April 21, 2012	202
A pinball-machine tank for an arcade-game enthusiast in Chicago; a tank for a robotics-systems company in Massachusetts.
9	3	"Serenity Now"	April 28, 2012	203
A tank for a tattoo parlor in Las Vegas to soothe nervous customers; a show piece for a furniture store in North Carolina.
10	4	"Roll With It"	May 5, 2012	204
The Pensacola Blue Wahoos ask Wayde and Brett to turn an old school bus into a mobile fish tank, but they have to change plans when they learn they can't pay for it; Brett comes up with a unique tank design for his mother's favorite nail salon.
11	5	"Tanks for the Memories"	May 12, 2012	205
The crew discuss their favorite tanks and pranks from Season 1 in an episode that features unseen footage.
12	6	"Polar Opposites"	May 19, 2012	206
The hosts head to the Valley View Casino in California to build a 35 ft (10.7 m) long marquee tank within a strictly specified amount of time; the Monte Carlo's Minus 5 Ice Bar in Las Vegas has Wayde and Brett in the deep freeze constructing a jellyfish tank.
13	7	"Most Challenging Tanks"	June 2, 2012	207
Wayde and Brett revisit their most challenging Tank builds.
14	8	"Where the Wild Things Are"	June 9, 2012	208
Wayde and Brett Have to come up with a tanked first when they incorporate all of what Petco has to offer in building them a three part tank for their headquarters. Also they get to build a tank built for Rock Legends Kiss!

=== Season 3 (2012) ===
No. overall	No. in season	Title	Original release date	Prod. code
15	1	"We're Gonna Need a Bigger Tank"	August 11, 2012	301
In the third-season premiere, Brett and Wayde work on a shark tank with a "Jaws" theme for comedian Tracy Morgan.
16	2	"For Love of the Game...Or Money?"	August 18, 2012	302
A koi pond for the NFL's Bart Scott; a vault tank for a Florida technology company.
17	3	"Flying High and Sinking Deep"	August 25, 2012	303
A manufacturing company flies Wayde and Brett to Chicago on a private jet to pitch their ambitious plans for a large aquarium over a second-floor staircase; a Caribbean restaurant in Philadelphia wants an interactive window tank with remote-controlled submarines.
18	4	"Nuclear Family"	September 8, 2012	304
The Acrylic Tank Manufacturing crew recall the most memorable tanks of the year, and share the highs and lows of working for a family business.
19	5	"Love is an Illusion"	September 15, 2012	305
A Houdini Tank for Neil Patrick Harris; a tv tank for a small client.
20	6	"On the Road Again"	September 22, 2012	306
Brett and Wayde recall their most memorable tank-building experiences.
21	7	"Midwest Zest"	November 17, 2012	307
A treasure chest tank for a children's hospital; new responsibilities for Agnes and Heather; a tank for a leasing company.

=== Season 4 (2013) ===
No. overall	No. in season	Title	Original release date	Prod. code
22	1	"Pranks and Dranks!"	March 22, 2013	401
Brett and Wayde work on a tank with a twist for Jackass creator Jeff Tremaine. They also visit the Tropical Smoothie Cafe for a sweet treat.
23	2	"Learn to Love or Love to Learn"	March 29, 2013	402
Las Vegas Weddings asks Wayde and Brett to make an old-school Vegas style tank for their chapel. And the Lion's of Saint Leo University ask for a new draw in their student common area.
24	3	"Groovy Sarcophagus, Man"	April 5, 2013	403
In New York, a Cleopatra-inspired hotel asks Wayde and Brett for a one-of-a-kind tank that fits their theme. Also, Spencer Gifts asks for a larger representation of their iconic lava lamp.
25	4	"Tip of the Hat to the Devils"	April 12, 2013	404
The Fairleigh Dickinson Devils request a tank with fire and fish for their student pub. In Vegas, a hat making company wants a giant koi pond that looks like a top hat.
26	5	"Spin the Bottles"	April 19, 2013	405
A rocket ship tank is requested for a candy shop. Wayde and Brett outfit it with a launch pad, countdown and smoke machine. Plus a vineyard owner requests his historic old wagon be used for displaying a tank outside.
27	6	"A Guide Light to Fitness"	April 26, 2013	406
Wayde and Brett design a multipurpose tank for a fitness mogul; an Alabama casino requests a tank with a scaled replica of a historical lighthouse.
28	7	"Nigiri and the NBA"	May 3, 2013	407
Wayde and Brett create a temporary tank for basketball star Dwyane Wade; a North Carolina restaurant requests a burger- and sushi-filled aquarium.
29	8	"Fermenting Donuts"	May 10, 2013	408
Wayde and Brett transport a fully operational beer fermenter, then head south to create a doughnut-shaped tank.
30	9	"A Healthy Dose of ATM"	May 17, 2013	409
A Florida medical facility desires a tank in the shape of a syringe; Wayde and Brett must construct an aquarium for their new shop.
31	10	"Jurassic Campground"	May 31, 2013	410
Redneck designs a RV aquarium; the team builds a large indoor tank that holds both alligators and sharks.
32	11	"Popcorn on the High Seas"	June 7, 2013	411
Wayde and Brett create two aquariums for a mall's new food court, then work to transform a vintage popcorn machine into a tank.

=== Season 5 (2013) ===
No. overall	No. in season	Title	Original release date	Prod. code
33	1	"Sweet Memories"	August 2, 2013	501
34	2	"Just What the Doctor Ordered"	August 9, 2013	502
35	3	"Smiling is the Best Medicine"	August 16, 2013	503
36	4	"Lifestyles of the Fish & Famous" "Tanked Celebrity Edition" (as broadcast)	August 23, 2013	504
A special episode where Brett & Wayde go back in time to their celebrity friends who got Tanked including magician and actor Neil Patrick Harris, comedian Tracy Morgan and rock band Kiss.
37	5	"Brace Yourself for Employee of the Month"	September 6, 2013	505
Wayde and Brett visit some construction builders at a luxury condo complex, and build a tank made in a wave shape. Meanwhile, Wayde sets up an 'Employee of the Month' competition, but when everybody including Brett, Agnes and Heather work so hard, in the end the winner is Kyle!
38	6	"Tricks and Trees"	September 13, 2013	506
Wayde and Brett are challenged to build an aquarium inside an oak tree. Back in Vegas, a store's request for a coffin tank brings the scare tactics in everyone.

=== Season 6 (2013–14) ===
No. overall	No. in season	Title	Original release date	Prod. code
39	1	"Rock 'n Roll Eruption!"	November 1, 2013	601
Wayde and Brett build a volcano tank for a Hawaiian restaurant, and a drum kit tank for a music store.
40	2	"Legal Vending Machine"	November 8, 2013	602
41	3	"Tracy and his Octopus"	November 15, 2013	603
Tracy Morgan's octopus needs a new home. Also, Morgan's baby gets a tank.
42	4	"Crazy Client Requests"	November 22, 2013	604
On this special episode, Wayde and Brett show some of the most outrageous tanks ever built with some unseen footage.
43	5	"Betty White's Got an App for That"	November 29, 2013	605
44	6	"Tanked for the Holidays"	December 12, 2013	330

=== Season 7 (2014) ===
No. overall	No. in season	Title	Original release date	Prod. code
45	1	"Driving New Business"	March 7, 2014	701
46	2	"NASCAR and Baseball Champions Tanks"	March 14, 2014	702
47	3	"Tanks on Tap"	March 21, 2014	703
48	4	"Tank This"	March 28, 2014	704
When a client asks for any object to become a tank, if it's a drum or a telephone box, Brett & Wayde must make it happen, as their motto is 'If you can dream it, We can build it'
49	5	"Give a Dog a Phone"	April 4, 2014	705
Wayde & Brett leave the General in charge of a dog house aquarium and giant telephone tank for a con, because of a virus spreading about.
50	6	"Hang Ten Barbeque"	April 11, 2014	706
A BBQ restaurant asks for a BBQ pig to be shaped into a tank; A pipeline wave tank for a salt life restaurant.
51	7	"Playing Favorites"	April 18, 2014	707
Every client loves their tank, but also do ATM have one favorite tank of their own.
52	8	"Dining With the Fishes"	April 25, 2014	708
53	9	"Making History"	May 2, 2014	709
54	10	"Shark Buffet"	May 9, 2014	710
55	11	"The Winds of Trade"	May 16, 2014	711

=== Season 8 (2014–15) ===
No. overall	No. in season	Title	Original release date	Prod. code	Viewers (millions)
56	1	"SHAQ-SIZED"	September 19, 2014	801	0.88
57	2	"Pete Rose Scores a Tank"	September 26, 2014	802	0.75
58	3	"Channeling the Long Island Medium"	October 3, 2014	803	0.75
59	4	"Medievil Protection"	October 10, 2014	804	0.64
60	5	"The Pirate Queen"	October 17, 2014	805	N/A
Drag queen Frank Marino, spokesperson for the Vegas bedding store, Holy Sheets, asks Wayde and Brett to create an over-the-top bed tank that will make customers want to sleep with the fishes. In Perdido Key, FL the guys build a Pirate Ship tank.
61	6	"Pipe Dreams"	October 24, 2014	806	0.59
62	7	"The Purr-fect Tank"	October 31, 2014	807	0.64
63	8	"Fish-a-Palooza"	November 7, 2014	808	0.48
64	9	"Saved by the Spell"	November 14, 2014	809	0.67
65	10	"Wilmer Valderrana"	November 21, 2014	810	0.68
66	11	"Tank You Come Again!"	November 28, 2014	811	0.48
67	12	"Tanked Again for the Holidays"	December 5, 2014	812	0.62
68	13	"When the Moon(shine) hits your eye"	December 19, 2014	813	0.76

=== Season 9 (2015) ===
No. overall	No. in season	Title	Original release date	Prod. code	US viewers (millions)
70	1	"Howie Mandel is the Brains Behind ATM"	May 29, 2015	901	0.78
Wayde and Brett build a tank for comedian Howie Mandel, based on his head, in his office
71	2	"Dwight Howard's Slithering Slam Dunk"	June 5, 2015	902	0.87
Wayde and Brett meet NBA Houston Rockets Basketball player Dwight Howard and build him a fish tank inside a snake tank. Dwight and Wayde prank Brett by saying there is an escaped snake in Dwight's house, knowing Brett's fear for snakes.
72	3	"Gabriel Iglesias' Fluffy Tank"	June 12, 2015	903	0.98
Gabriel Iglesias gets a tank from ATM, based on a van cut in half, showing the back half as Gulf of Mexico and the front half as Hawaii
73	4	"Marshawn Lynch Goes Beast Mode"	June 19, 2015	904	0.74
NFL player Marshawn Lynch gets a beast mode fish tank by ATM
74	5	"Jeff Dunham's Tank for Dummies"	June 26, 2015	905	1.04
Ventriloquist Jeff Dunham has a tank For Dummies.
75	6	"Hoff the Charts"	September 18, 2015	906	0.71
David Hasselhoff has Wayde and Brett build him a "hofftastic" tank.
76	7	"Penn & Teller Monkey Magic"	September 25, 2015	907	0.73
Penn & Teller the magic stars get tanked with a truly amazing magic tank
77	8	"Sherri Shepherd on the Rocks"	October 2, 2015	908	0.71
The guys build two tanks. One for famous comedian and actress Sherri Shepherd and another for the Rugged Ridge company
78	9	"Bill Engvall: Here's Your Tank!"	October 9, 2015	909	0.56
Comedian Bill Engvall wants a tank on the wall in his business's building, but there is a slight challenge in building a tank with weight limit.
79	10	"Tanks and Roses"	October 23, 2015	910	0.58
Former Guns N' Roses guitarist DJ Ashba requests a skull-theme aquarium.
80	11	"Boyz II Men to ATM"	October 30, 2015	911	0.54
Boy band Boyz II Men really want to fire up a nice rank, also, the Greensboro Science Center wants a large tank based on a shipwreck.
81	12	"NBA Wizardry"	November 6, 2015	912	0.58
NBA star John Wall dices a terrific tank, while a restaurant wants a large lighthouse tank.
82	13	"Chicago Bull Boom Box"	November 13, 2015	913	0.69
Great star Jimmy Butler checks out for a boombox tank in his small flat, and Donald Penn tries for a tank fix .
83	14	"Shaq-A-Tank!"	November 20, 2015	914	0.61
Retired NBA star Shaquille O'Neal needs another tank, an Egyptian themed tank for his Egyptian themed room.
84	15	"Holiday Madness"	December 25, 2015	915	0.56
The guys have a break from building tanks, so to cure boredom, they challenge each other as to who can build a better a tank, so Guns N' Roses star DJ Ashba and Jeff Tremaine become judges and assistants, and turns out to be a real hard challenge.
TBA	TBA	TBA	TBA	TBA	

=== Season 10 (2016) ===
No. overall	No. in season	Title	Original release date	Prod. code	US viewers (millions)
86	1	"100 Episodes Strong"	April 15, 2016	1001	N/A
Assembling a Florida Gators-themed tank for alumnus Titus O'Neil, to commemorate the 100th episode; an aftershow follows.
87	2	"Johnny Damon is Expecting the Unexpected"	April 22, 2016	1002	N/A
Two-time MLB World Series champion Johnny Damon and his wife, expecting a child, want the ATM crew to help reveal the gender of their baby at a party by building two different tanks.
88	3	"Nick Carter Wants His Tank That Way"	April 29, 2016	1003	N/A
Backstreet Boy and Dancing with The Stars finalist Nick Carter wants an aquarium for his Los Angeles home. A paddle boat theme seems impossible until Wayde finds one in the middle of the desert.
89	4	"Prince Fielder's Big Hit"	May 6, 2016	1004	N/A
The Texas Ranger's biggest slugger, Prince Fielder is building his man cave in his home in Orlando, Florida. No man cave is complete without an elegant, saltwater aquarium that is viewable from two sides.
90	5	"2 Chainz, 1 Tank"	May 13, 2016	1005	N/A
A Request from rapper 2 Chainz based on Atlanta's skyline
91	6	"Prince Royce's Royal Tank"	June 3, 2016	1006	N/A
Latin Musician Prince Royce hits a crazy tank in his greatest house area!
92	7	"Imaginarium Aquarium"	June 10, 2016	1007	N/A
An amazing airport restaurant request; A Massive ship replica
93	8	"Bellagio Makeover"	June 17, 2016	1008	N/A
One of the most famous Hotel Casinos ever, Bellagio, charge a large deal for a giant tank
94	9	"Party Rockin' Tank"	June 24, 2016	1009	N/A
Thanks to Redfoo, a new tank for them to build in the house of the killer DJ
95	10	"Internet Tank Sensation"	July 1, 2016	1010	N/A
Everybody loves YouTuber and prankster Roman Atwood and Smile More, which just happens to seem when Roman himself wants a tank!

=== Season 11 (2016) ===
No. overall	No. in season	Title	Original release date	Prod. code	US viewers (millions)
96	1	"Fish Flop Hip Hop"	September 23, 2016	1101	0.53
In the season premiere, rapper Akon wants two centerpiece tanks for his new dream house, but everything has to be in place before he can move in.
97	2	"Fish City, Kid"	September 30, 2016	1102	0.65
Rapper Tyga requests a tank dedicated to his song "Rack City", so Wayde and Brett have to figure out how to fill it with money.
98	3	"Real Aquariums of Beverly Hills"	October 7, 2016	1103	0.55
Erika Giardi (The Real Housewives of Beverly Hills) requests an aquarium that has room for an octopus.
99	4	"DJ of Dragons"	October 14, 2016	1104	0.46
100	5	"Country Superstar Surprise!"	October 21, 2016	1105	0.69
101	6	"Nacho Average Fish Tanks"	October 28, 2016	1106	0.57
102	7	"Going for the Gold(fish)"	November 4, 2016	1107	0.62
103	8	"The Miami Heat is On!"	November 11, 2016	1108	0.60
104	9	"Thumbs Up!"	November 18, 2016	1109	0.48

=== Special episodes (2016–17) ===
No. overall	No. in season	Title	Original release date	Prod. code	US viewers (millions)
105	1	"Tanks for the Help"	December 9, 2016	N/A	N/A
106	2	"Sea-Lebrity Edition: Trickster Tanks"	December 16, 2016	N/A	N/A
107	3	"We Fish You a Merry Christmas"	December 16, 2016	N/A	N/A
108	4	"Merry Fishmas: Tanks of Christmas Past"	December 25, 2016	N/A	N/A
109	5	"Not-So-Freshwater Tank"	February 17, 2017	S101	N/A
110	6	"Fish Out of Water"	February 24, 2017	S102	N/A
111	7	"Nightmare Tanks"	March 3, 2017	S103	N/A
112	8	"Tanks Again For The Help"	March 10, 2017	N/A	N/A

=== Season 12 (2017) ===
No. overall	No. in season	Title	Original release date	Prod. code	US viewers (millions)
113	1	"Tank of Jericho"	April 21, 2017	1201	0.54
114	2	"Kevin Smith's Tortally Awesome Tank"	April 28, 2017	1202	0.44
115	3	"Shark Byte"	May 5, 2017	1203	0.54
116	4	"Alyssa's Charmed Tank"	May 12, 2017	1204	0.59
117	5	"Sweet Tank O' Mine"	May 19, 2017	1205	0.53
118	6	"Ty Dolla's Fresh Tank"	June 2, 2017	1206	0.59
119	7	"Panama City Beach Tank"	June 9, 2017	1207	0.53
120	8	"Wyclef's Tank Is Ready, or Not?"	June 16, 2017	1208	0.60
121	9	"Spin Cycle Spec-Tank-ular!"	June 23, 2017	1209	0.48
Las Vegas Coin Laundry is requesting an aquarium built into a real washer/dryer unit just like the others in their store. across town, an Optometrist (Spectacle) wants an eye-popping underworld world for their patients.
122	10	"Extreme Pond Off! Wayde vs. Brett"	June 30, 2017	1210	0.69
Wayde and Brett are going head-to-head as they both want a one-of-a-kind, extreme pond in their backyard; as they build their ponds, they are keeping everything top secret from each other.

=== Season 13 (2017) ===
No. overall	No. in season	Title	Original release date	Prod. code	US viewers (millions)
123	1	"Antonio Brown's Touchdown Tank"	October 6, 2017	1301	0.50
124	2	"San Francisco Giants Tank"	October 13, 2017	1302	0.44
125	3	"Dwight Howard's Slamming Snake Tank"	October 20, 2017	1303	0.44
126	4	"Adrian Peterson's MVP Tank"	November 3, 2017	1304	0.50
127	5	"Shark Tank in The Shark Tank"	November 10, 2017	1305	0.40
128	6	"Tanked in Sonoma"	November 17, 2017	1306	0.56
129	7	"Anthony Davis' High Brow Tank"	November 24, 2017	1307	0.62
130	8	"The Tank of Atlantis"	December 1, 2017	1308	0.46
131	9	"This Tank Is Ludacis"	December 8, 2017	1309	0.42
132	10	"Napping with the Fishes"	December 15, 2017	1310	0.44

=== Season 14 (2018) ===
No. overall	No. in season	Title	Original release date	Prod. code	US viewers (millions)
133	1	"Keyshia Cole's Dream Tank"	March 31, 2018	1401	0.453
134	2	"Brett's Donut Mania Tank"	April 7, 2018	1402	0.500
135	3	"Triple Tank Throwdown!"	April 14, 2018	1403	0.533
136	4	"Fernando Vargas’ Knockout Tank"	April 21, 2018	1404	0.398
137	5	"Mel's Drive In Tank"	April 27, 2018	1405	N/A
138	6	"Howie Mandel's Surprise Tank"	May 4, 2018	1406	N/A
139	7	"Gangster Tank"	May 11, 2018	1407	N/A
140	8	"The Amazing Piano Tank"	May 18, 2018	1408	N/A
141	9	"The Fast and the Fishiest"	May 25, 2018	1409	N/A
142	10	"Kurt Busch's TANK-A-DEGA 500"	June 1, 2018	1410	N/A
143	11	"The Dunk Tanks"	June 8, 2018	1411	N/A

=== Season 15 (2018) ===
No. overall	No. in season	Title	Original release date	Prod. code	US viewers (millions)
144	1	"The Wonderful Dr. Oz Tank"	November 2, 2018	1501	N/A
Dr. Oz asks for an aquarium which will include an Oz-theme interior that will have the fish swimming down the yellow brick road.
145	2	"Wildfire Rescue Tribute Tank"	November 2, 2018	1502	N/A
Coddingtown Center in Santa Rosa, Cal., task the guys with a wildfire rescue tribute tank.
146	3	"Demarcus Cousins and a Snake Tank"	November 9, 2018	1503	N/A
Wayde and Brett have two clients who want aquariums in their own backyard: basketball player, Demarcus Cousins, wants a corner tank for his Las Vegas house; and a pet store wants a tank for both fish and reptiles.
147	4	"Be Cool"	November 16, 2018	1504	N/A
MMA fighter Urijah Faber just opened his new gym and wants a little bit of the ocean inside, specifically a puffer. Meanwhile, a couple hosts a party for the Marine Aquarium Convention.
148	5	"All in The Ocean"	November 23, 2018	1505	N/A
The team is tasked with a 6,000-gallon aquarium for the Ocean Casino Resort in Atlantic City.
149	6	"Clay Matthews' Green Bay Eel Tank"	November 30, 2018	1506	N/A
The team is tasked to build NFL Star Clay Matthews an eel tank
150	7	"Healing Garden Waterfall"	December 7, 2018	1507	N/A
Lifestyle brand Salt Life needs Wayde and Brett's help again! This time, they want an aquarium even BIGGER and BETTER than the original! Closer to home, the guys get asked to build a custom acrylic waterfall as part of a memorial in Las Vegas.
151	8	"A Merry Fishy Christmas"	December 14, 2018	1508	N/A
The team is tasked with building a tank for Ethel M, a chocolate factory in Vegas, and also the team has a surprise in store for Wayde.
152	9	"Tracy Morgans Giant Shark Tank Under Construction"	December 14, 2018	1509	N/A
The team is tasked with building another shark tank for comedian Tracy Morgan
153	10	"Tracy Morgan's Giant Shark Tank Revealed!"	December 28, 2018	1510	N/A
The team shows the new shark tank of comedian Tracy Morgan

== See also ==
- List of television shows set in Las Vegas
