= Here's the Deal: Don't Touch Me =

Book by Howie Mandel

- Author: Howie Mandel with Josh Young
- Publisher: Bantam Books
- Publication date: 2009
- Publication place: United States
- Pages: 220
- ISBN: 978-0-553-80786-8

Here's the Deal: Don't Touch Me is the humorous autobiography of Howie Mandel, written with Josh Young, in which he discusses his obsessive–compulsive disorder (OCD) and attention deficit hyperactivity disorder (ADHD). Larry King has called it an "important book".

Despite the fact that Mandel says that these moments in his life "gets dark and there's a lot of terror involved, but I can have fun with it, and I know it's funny." He said:

I thought I had a light, kind of funny look at my life, my career, with great little anecdotes that would be kind of funny….and then I realized, I know that I deal with OCD and anxiety and ADHD each and every day, and I didn't realize how much it informed everything that I do.

He also refers to the book as a "love letter" to his wife, who has been with him for 36 years, helping him cope with his condition.

The book is not entirely about Mandel's struggles; he adds a number of comedic episodes throughout. One of these recollections details how, as a youngster, Mandel decided to remove all of the photos from a girl's wall and remove one nail. When the girl attempted to put the photos back, one would not fit. Practical jokes like these are found throughout the autobiography.

Mandel has admitted to being "terrorized" and under medication for the book tour; he was forced to wear a surgical mask and rubber gloves to his book signings so that he could comfortably interact with his fans. In addition, he has commented on the irony of having his book released in the midst of the H1N1 flu pandemic.

While he did not explicitly intend to convey a societal message with the book, Mandel does advocate the wider awareness of coping skills achieved via therapy and medication – people "take care of their dental health, but they don't take care of their mental health".
