= Yehuda Duenyas =

Intimacy coordinator and film director

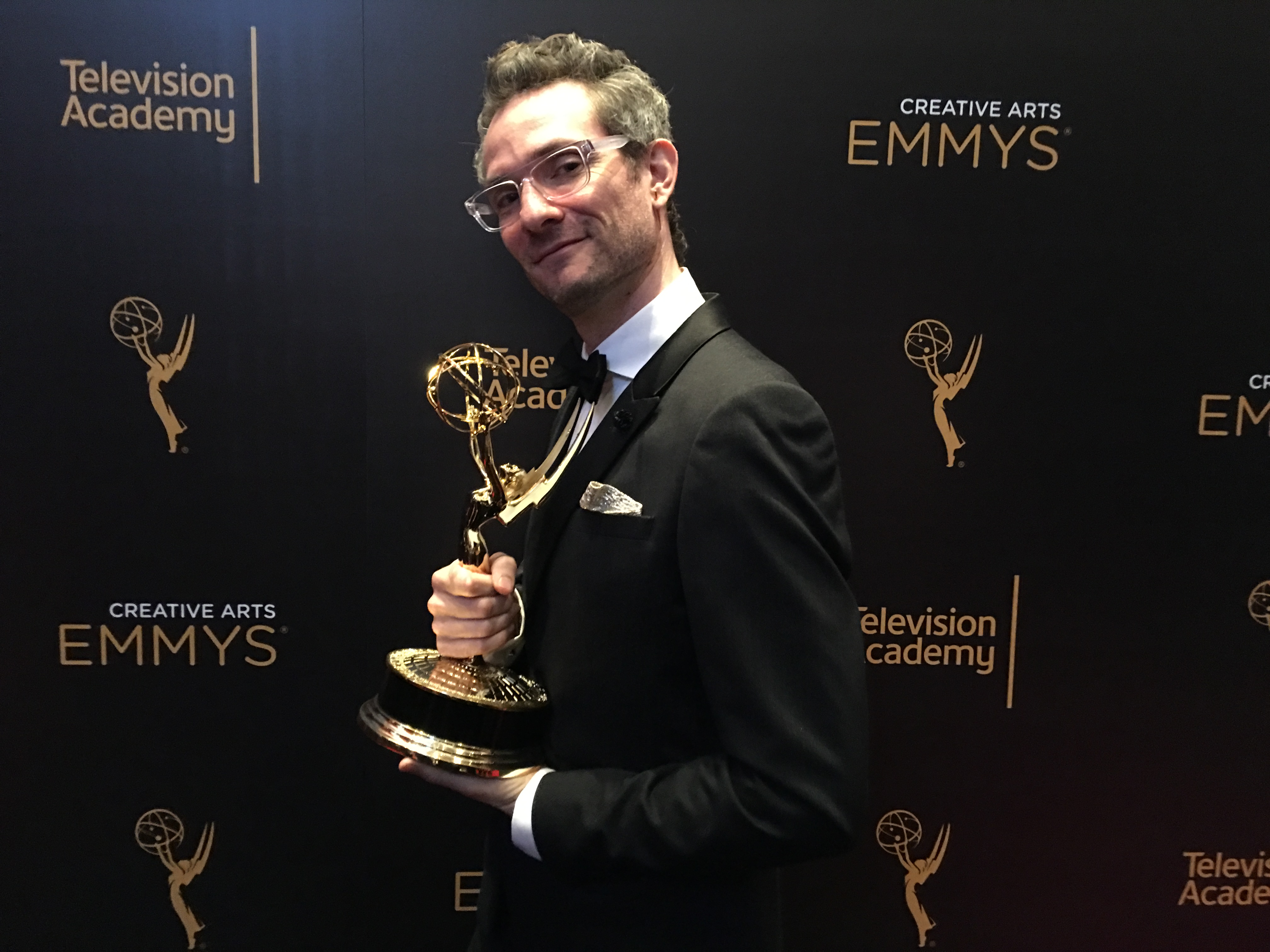
- Born: 1974 (age 51–52); Los Angeles
- Occupations: Producer, choreographer, performer, filmmaker
- Years active: 1997 to present
- Known for: Experiential Director, Intimacy Coordinator
- Notable work: Love Has No Labels
- Awards: Prime-time Emmy
- Website: Official website

Yehuda Duenyas is a Los Angeles-based experiential director and intimacy coordinator, known for being the first "sex choreographer" credited in a professional programme. They (Note: Duenyas uses both he/him and they/them pronouns. This article uses the latter for consistency.) are the founder and creative director of Mindride, and producer of the Emmy Award winning work Love Has No Labels.

== Early life and education ==
Duenyas was born in Los Angeles, California, earned a Bachelor of Science, cum laude, in Theater from Skidmore College and a Master of Fine Arts in Integrated Electronic Arts from Rensselaer Polytechnic Institute (RPI). In the late 1990s, Duenyas moved to New York City, where they became active in the downtown performance and experimental theater scenes.

== Career ==
=== Experimental theater and burlesque ===
From 1999 to 2009, Duenyas was a founding member of the National Theater of the United States of America (NTUSA), an OBIE Award-winning collective. During this period, Duenyas also performed under the name Duke Lafayette as a burlesque artist at The Box in New York City. In the early 2010s, they toured nationally with Dita Von Teese.

=== Intimacy coordination ===
Duenyas began their work in intimacy coordination in 2007 while directing Purity by Thomas Bradshaw, a play featuring explicit and emotionally charged material. Duenyas developed early consent-based frameworks to protect actors physically and emotionally. In 2015, Bradshaw invited Duenyas to choreograph intimate scenes for his play Fulfillment. Rather than accept the title “consultant,” Duenyas requested to be credited as Sex Choreographer. Duenyas transitioned to intimacy work for film and television in 2016 and has since worked across most genres and formats. In an interview by Newsweek, Duenyas advocated for intimacy coordination, saying "The camera may capture fiction, but the impact on the actor's body and nervous system is real. Without planning, boundaries, and oversight, productions risk causing genuine harm."

=== Intimacy coordination select credits ===
Intimacy coordination for theater credits include:
- Faye Driscoll’s Weathering (NY Live Arts; The Blackwood, Toronto)
- The Beautiful People (Rogue Machine, LA)
- Tom Bradshaw’s Fulfillment (The Flea, NYC; ATC, Chicago).

Film and TV credits include:
- MONSTER: The Jeffrey Dahmer Story (NETFLIX);
- Westworld S4 (HBO);
- The Afterparty S2 (APPLE TV);
- American Gigolo (Paramount+).
- I Want Your Sex (2026)

=== Experiential and commercial work ===
Beyond intimacy coordination, Duenyas works in immersive and experiential storytelling. The Ascent (2011), depicts an interactive installation in which participants levitate using EEG brainwave sensors. Premiered at the Experimental Media and Performing Arts Center (EMPAC), the work combined neuroscience, meditation, and performance to explore themes of surrender and transcendence. Duenyas has directed and designed experiences for clients including Google, YouTube, Netflix, HBO, Showtime, Audi, Spotify, MGM/UA, and Walt Disney Imagineering.

== Awards and recognition ==
- Love Has No Labels

Primetime Emmy Award
8 Cannes Lions
11 Clio Awards
2 Facebook Awards

- 2 Webby Awards
- OBIE Award – National Theater of the United States of America

In 2022, Duenyas co-founded CINTIMA (Cinematic Intimacy Artists), a SAG-AFTRA accredited training program, for aspiring intimacy coordinators.
