= Howie Mandel =

Canadian actor and comedian (born 1955)

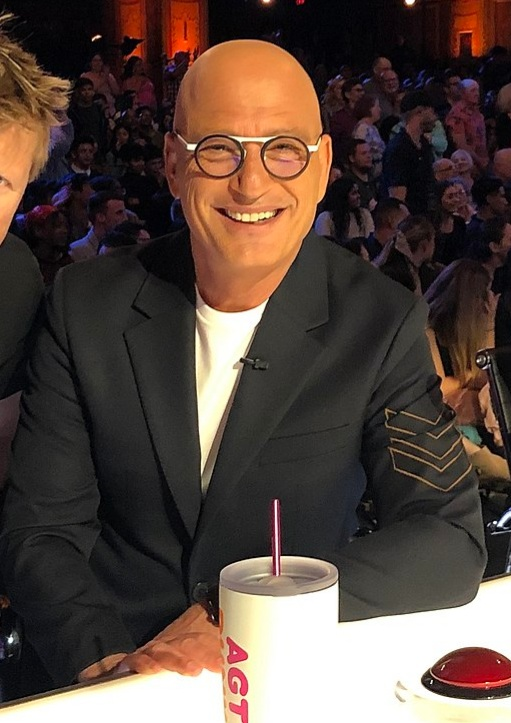
- Mandel at America's Got Talent in 2020
- Born: Howard Michael Mandel; November 29, 1955 (age 70); Toronto, Ontario, Canada
- Occupations: Comedian; television personality; actor; producer
- Spouse: Terry Soil (m. 1980)
- Children: 3

Comedy career
- Years active: 1978–present
- Medium: Stand-up, television, film, books
- Genres: Observational comedy, improvisational comedy
- Subjects: Everyday life, self-deprecation
- Website: howiemandel.com

Howard Michael Mandel (born November 29, 1955) is a Canadian comedian, television personality, actor, and producer. Mandel is known for voicing Gizmo in the 1984 film Gremlins and the 1990 sequel Gremlins 2: The New Batch; playing rowdy emergency room resident Dr. Wayne Fiscus on the NBC medical drama St. Elsewhere; and creating and starring in the Fox children's cartoon Bobby's World. He has also been a judge on NBC's America's Got Talent since 2010, and Citytv's Canada's Got Talent since 2022. He hosted the American NBC and later CNBC game show Deal or No Deal, as well as the show's daytime and Canadian-English counterparts. He became the host of The Price Is Right Tonight, a Canadian version of The Price Is Right franchise, in 2026.

== Early life and education ==
Mandel was born on November 29, 1955, in Toronto. He grew up in the Bathurst Manor neighbourhood of the city. His ancestors were Romanian Jews and Polish Jews. Mandel is a distant cousin of Israeli violinist Itzhak Perlman. His father was a lighting manufacturer and a real estate magnate. Mandel attended William Lyon Mackenzie Collegiate Institute, where he was expelled.

Afterwards, Mandel worked as a carpet salesman. He was a stand-up comedian at Yuk Yuk's in Toronto, and by September 1978 he had a week-long booking as a featured act, which was billed as "a wild and crazy borderline psychotic".

On a trip to Los Angeles, Mandel performed a set at The Comedy Store, which resulted in his being hired as a regular performer. A producer for the syndicated comedy game show Make Me Laugh saw him there, and booked Mandel for several appearances during the show's run in 1979 and 1980. He was booked to open for David Letterman at shows in the summer of 1979. CBC-TV's head of variety programming saw his performance in October 1979 and immediately signed him for a TV special. In 1980, he won the lead role in the Canadian movie Gas, co-starring Susan Anspach and Donald Sutherland. Mandel was one of the first "VeeJays" to appear on Nickelodeon's music video series PopClips.

== Career ==
=== Film and television ===
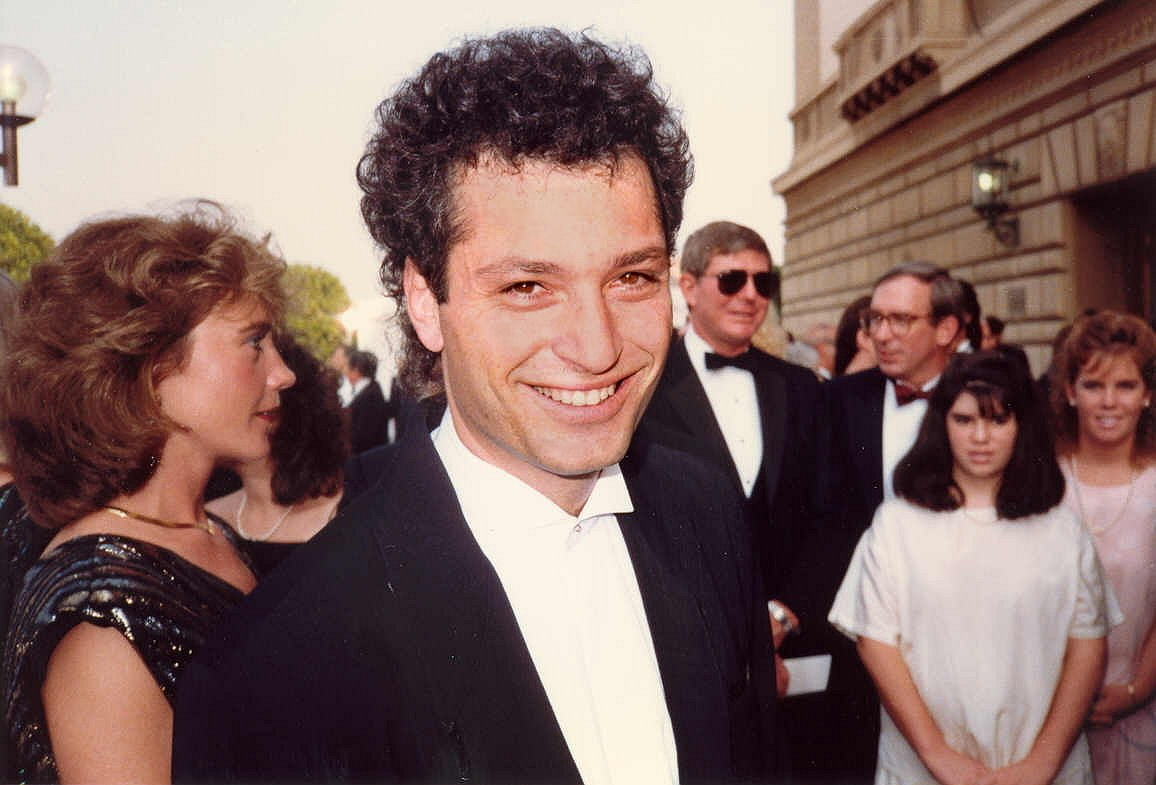
Mandel at the 39th Emmy Awards in 1987

Mandel came to national attention in the United States during a six-year run on St. Elsewhere, starting in 1982 and playing the role of Dr. Wayne Fiscus, opposite Ed Flanders and Norman Lloyd. He also appeared on a week's worth of episodes of the short-lived NBC game show Match Game-Hollywood Squares Hour in March 1984. While working as Dr. Fiscus and continuing to work as a comedian, Mandel also worked in films, including providing the voice of Gizmo in the 1984 hit Gremlins and its 1990 sequel, Gremlins 2: The New Batch. In 1985, Mandel made a cameo in the Michael J. Fox directed short "The Iceman Hummeth", which was subsequently broadcast on Late Night with David Letterman in November 1985. In 1986, he starred in A Fine Mess alongside Ted Danson. He performed his stand-up comedy act in several cities (the Watusi Tour), which was followed by his Watusi music video in 1987. For the first two seasons of Muppet Babies, he voiced Bunsen Honeydew, Animal, and Skeeter. He starred alongside Amy Steel in the 1987 comedy film Walk Like a Man. He was also "Maurice" in the 1989 movie Little Monsters. In 1990, he starred in the short-lived sitcom Good Grief on Fox. He was also the creator and executive producer of the Emmy-nominated children's animated series Bobby's World (1990–1998) to which he supplied the voices of the title character and his father. Bobby's World ran for seven seasons on Fox and was later syndicated.

In 1992, his self-titled comedy show Howie was aired weekly with multiple guest stars including Gilbert Gottfried, Little Richard, and Lita Ford as the in-house band guitarist. His character, Bobby, made a regular appearance on the show. In 1994, Mandel voiced the lead character, Little Howie, of the video game Tuneland. He starred in the sketch comedy series Howie Mandel's Sunny Skies in 1995 on Showtime. Mandel appeared in the 1995 Clint Black music video "Summer's Comin' ". He played the lead role of the professor in the short-lived TV series The Amazing Live Sea Monkeys, and he guest-starred on a 1996 episode of the ABC TV series Lois & Clark: The New Adventures of Superman as the supervillain Mister Mxyzptlk. In 1998, he hosted his syndicated talk show, The Howie Mandel Show, which was cancelled after one season. From 1999 to 2000, he played Jason in the film Apocalypse III: Tribulation, was the voice of Jack in the movie The Tangerine Bear in 2000, and 2002 he played the Sand Man in the movie Hansel and Gretel. In 2006, he appeared as himself as a guest host in a parody of Deal or No Deal in the show-within-a-show of the TV series Studio 60 on the Sunset Strip. In 2007, he guest-starred as himself in an episode of NBC's Medium and made a dream cameo of himself on Deal or No Deal. In that episode, he booted the nighttime drama's protagonist off for "cheating" since in the show, he is a psychic medium and appeared to "know" the contents of the cases. Mandel plays his alter ego, Phil Skorjanc, in most of his comedy shows, which are a fan favourite. Bobby also made a cameo appearance in a February 2007 episode of Deal or No Deal. On a special two-hour Christmas episode, first aired on December 25, 2007, Mandel delivered one line with Bobby's voice, as requested by the contestant.

Mandel's signature stunt as a stand-up comedian (besides his Bobby alter ego) was stretching a latex glove over his head, inflating it with his nostrils, and filling it until it suddenly propelled itself off his head. That trick also lent itself to the title and cover photo of his comedy album Fits Like a Glove (1986). He eventually gave up the routine under doctor's orders after being diagnosed with a perforated sinus. However, in a cameo role as himself on My Name Is Earl, he did the routine. He guest-starred in two episodes of Monk ("Mr. Monk Joins a Cult" and "Mr. Monk's 100th Case").

=== Additional appearances ===
Mandel is known for his frequent appearances as a comedian and for his hidden camera segments on The Tonight Show with Jay Leno. He has appeared in many television commercials for Boston Pizza as their hired spokesperson. In April 2004, he appeared as number 82 on Comedy Central's list of the 100 greatest stand-up comedians of all time. In October 2005, he was named to be the host of the American version of Deal or No Deal, which debuted on December 19, 2005, on NBC, and became a popular program in early 2006. Mandel also hosts Deal or No Deal Canada; originating from Toronto, Deal or No Deal Canada debuted in January 2007 on Global, which made him one of the few game show hosts (Weakest Link's Anne Robinson, The Chair's John McEnroe, Pyramid's Donny Osmond, The Singing Bee's Joey Fatone, and Minute to Win It's Darren McMullen being others) to host both a domestic and an international version of the same game show. Mandel joins Alex Trebek, Jim Perry, and Geoff Edwards on the list of game show hosts who emceed one game show simultaneously in Canada and the United States.

In 2007, Mandel made an appearance in an episode of Sesame Street's 38th season. Also in 2007, he was parodied on the show as Howie Eats well, the Muppet host of Sesame's game show segment "Meal or No Meal". Mandel has hosted the DVD game version of Deal or No Deal, "Fact or Crap Beat Da Bomb", and "Would You Rather" for Imagination Games. Mandel had a cameo appearance as himself on the NBC show My Name Is Earl in the episode where Earl's roommates robbed an Indian casino at which Mandel was performing. While stealing money, they also kidnapped Mandel. In the episode, Mandel performed his old routine of inflating a rubber glove over his head with his nostrils.

Mandel is a notable alumnus of Beth David B'nai Israel Beth Am's Hebrew School in Toronto, as well as three other Toronto high schools. He performs a variety/comedy act at the MGM Grand Hotel-Casino in Las Vegas. Beginning in 2007, Mandel became a spokesperson for Internet retailer buy.com. He is sometimes featured in a section called "What's Shakin'?" with Mandel. On September 8, 2008, Mandel began hosting a five-day-a-week syndicated daytime version of Deal or No Deal, with a top prize of $500,000. On January 9, 2009, Mandel's reality show Howie Do It premiered on NBC.

On March 31, 2011, Mandel premiered a flash-mob show on Fox called Mobbed. Originally a presentation pilot, the ratings after American Idol prompted Fox to pick up the show for eight to ten episodes. On October 18, 2012, Mandel appeared on The Big Bang Theory as himself in the season 6 episode "The Re-Entry Minimization". On November 30, 2012, he hosted the NASCAR Sprint Cup Awards Ceremony. On December 10, 2012, his six-night special game show Take It All premiered.

He appeared in one episode of the animated series Fugget About It as the voice of FBI Agent Rick Chickmagnet in 2013. From 2013 to 2014, Mandel executive-produced the TBS hidden-camera show Deal with It. He also regularly made appearances and co-hosted the show along with main host Theo Von. In 2023, Mandel competed in season nine of The Masked Singer as "Rock Lobster". He was eliminated on "ABBA Night" alongside Debbie Gibson as "Night Owl".

==== Deal or No Deal ====
In 2003, while Mandel was deciding whether or not to quit show business, the executive producers at NBC asked him to host the show, but he declined many times. They then mailed him a tape of the overseas version and he finally accepted. In 2007, he hosted a five-episode run of the Canadian-English version Deal or No Deal Canada. The show then went to daytime with Mandel remaining as host, although Arsenio Hall was originally intended to host the show. In a January 2009 interview on Anytime with Bob Kushell, Mandel expressed mild, jovial frustration over how some of his contestants hold out during the game show, even though the grand prize is many times what they would make in a year.

On March 12, 2018, it was announced that Mandel would host the 2018 CNBC revival of the game show and also become an executive producer. The show premiered on December 3, 2018. Mandel is one of four game show hosts to host the same game show in two different countries, the others being Donny Osmond for Pyramid in the United States and the United Kingdom, Jimmy Carr for Distraction in the United States and United Kingdom, Anne Robinson for The Weakest Link in the United States and the United Kingdom and Michael McIntyre for The Wheel in the United States and the United Kingdom.

In 2024, Mandel was credited as an executive producer on the reality game show spin-off of Deal or No Deal titled Deal or No Deal Island. In the finale of the first season, it was revealed that he is the secretive banker who made offers to the contestants over the course of the game. He did not return to be the banker for Season 2, as it was confirmed that the banker for that season would be a woman. The banker was later revealed to be celebrity and former Deal or No Deal briefcase model Chrissy Teigen.

==== Got Talent ====
In January 2010, it was announced that Mandel would replace David Hasselhoff as one of the judges on NBC's America's Got Talent after Hasselhoff announced that he was leaving to work on a new television series. Out of all judges on the show, Mandel currently has the longest tenure than any other judge or host, spanning 17 consecutive seasons (season 5–present).

In October 2021, it was announced that Mandel would be a judge on the second season of Canada's Got Talent, which aired in 2022.

==== Howie Mandel Does Stuff ====
Since February 2021, Mandel has hosted the Howie Mandel Does Stuff Podcast with his daughter, Jackelyn Shultz, as co-host. According to the Apple Podcasts preview: "Together, these two make prank calls, discuss pop culture, interview interesting people, say weird things, chat with listeners, get deep..."

==== Bullsh*t: The Game Show ====
On April 27, 2022, Netflix released the 10-episode debut season of Bullsh*t: The Game Show with Mandel as the host of the program. It was Mandel's first game show since the cancellation of the Deal or No Deal revival on CNBC in 2019. In this game show contestants have a chance to win up to $1,000,000 by answering a series of trivia questions but have to also be able to convince ("bullshit") a group of prospective challengers that the answer they give is right, even if it's not. (The contestant is shown whether or not their answer is correct as soon as they choose it.) After explaining their reasoning, the judges will vote on whether they think the contestant is "bullshitting" (lying), or telling the truth. At a certain time after they are done convincing the judges, Mandel will ask the contestant if their answer is correct, or if they were "bullshitting". If the contestant's answer is correct (or if it's incorrect, but they successfully convinced at least one judge that they were telling the truth), they win and move on to the question. If they lie and none of the three judges buy it, they are removed from the game. The next contestant is the judge who most accurately guessed whether or not the contestant was truthful during each question.

==== The Price Is Right Tonight ====
On June 3, 2025, it was announced that Howie Mandel would be hosting a Canadian spin-off of The Price Is Right, entitled The Price is Right Tonight.

== Activism ==
Mandel was a signatory of "Creative Community for Peace," a 2025 open letter condemning the Boycott, Divestment and Sanctions movement in the TV and film industry.

== Other businesses ==
Mandel is an avid tech futurist and has invested in many innovative startups. In 2021, he invested in MetaMedia's MagicScreen which plans interactive experiences for movie theatres. In 2022, he became an investor and frequent user of Proto Hologram technology. He uses it both for his own appearances and to promote the startup such as when he beamed into JFK Airport Terminal 4 to surprise travellers.

== Personal life ==
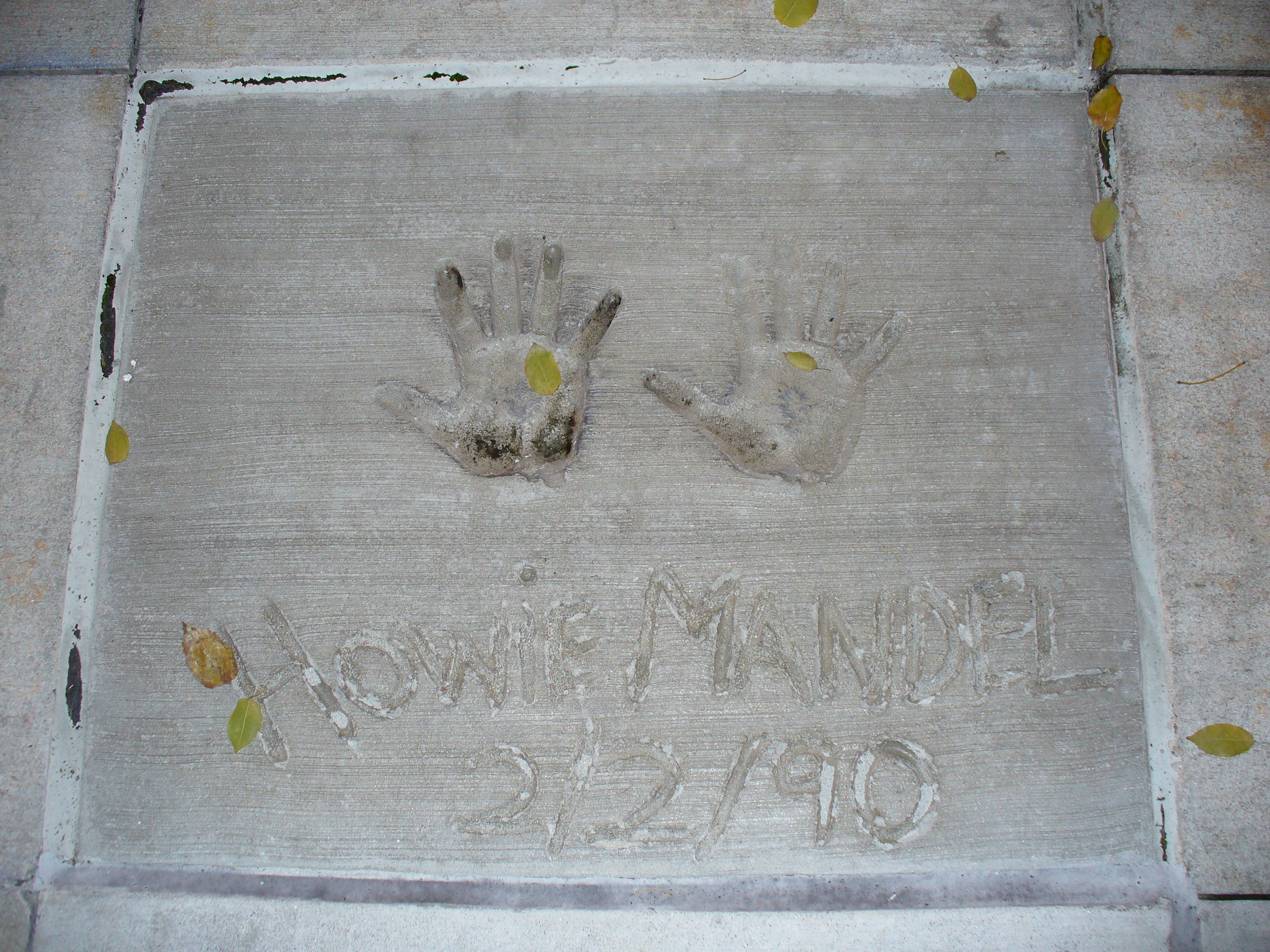
Hand prints of Mandel in front of Hollywood Hills Amphitheater at Disney's Hollywood Studios theme park

Mandel has been married to Terry Mandel (née Soil) since 1980. They have three children.

On September 4, 2008, Mandel received a star on the Hollywood Walk of Fame, and Comedy Central listed him as No. 82 on their list of the 100 greatest stand-up comedians of all time. Mandel received a star on Canada's Walk of Fame in Toronto. The induction ceremony was held on September 12, 2009.

In October 2008, Mandel revealed that he has attention deficit hyperactivity disorder (ADHD) on the morning talk show Live with Regis and Kelly, adding that he is currently working to raise adult ADHD awareness among the general public. On January 12, 2009, Mandel was reportedly sent to St. Michael's Hospital in Toronto suffering from chest pains and what was reported as a minor heart attack. According to various news reports, he was experiencing an irregular heartbeat, but the reports were later revealed as inaccurate. He was later discharged. Mandel has written and published an in-depth autobiography that details his life with OCD, ADHD, and comedy called Here's the Deal: Don't Touch Me.

Mandel is a fan of the Toronto Maple Leafs hockey team. He is colorblind and a germaphobe. He contracted COVID-19 at the 2022 Kids' Choice Awards, which caused him to miss parts of the third, eighth, and tenth episodes, and the entire seventh episode of the seventeenth season of America's Got Talent. The lockdown during the epidemic also led to physical and mental health struggles, including drug and substance abuse. Mandel lives in the Hollywood Hills area of Los Angeles.

=== Obsessive–compulsive disorder ===
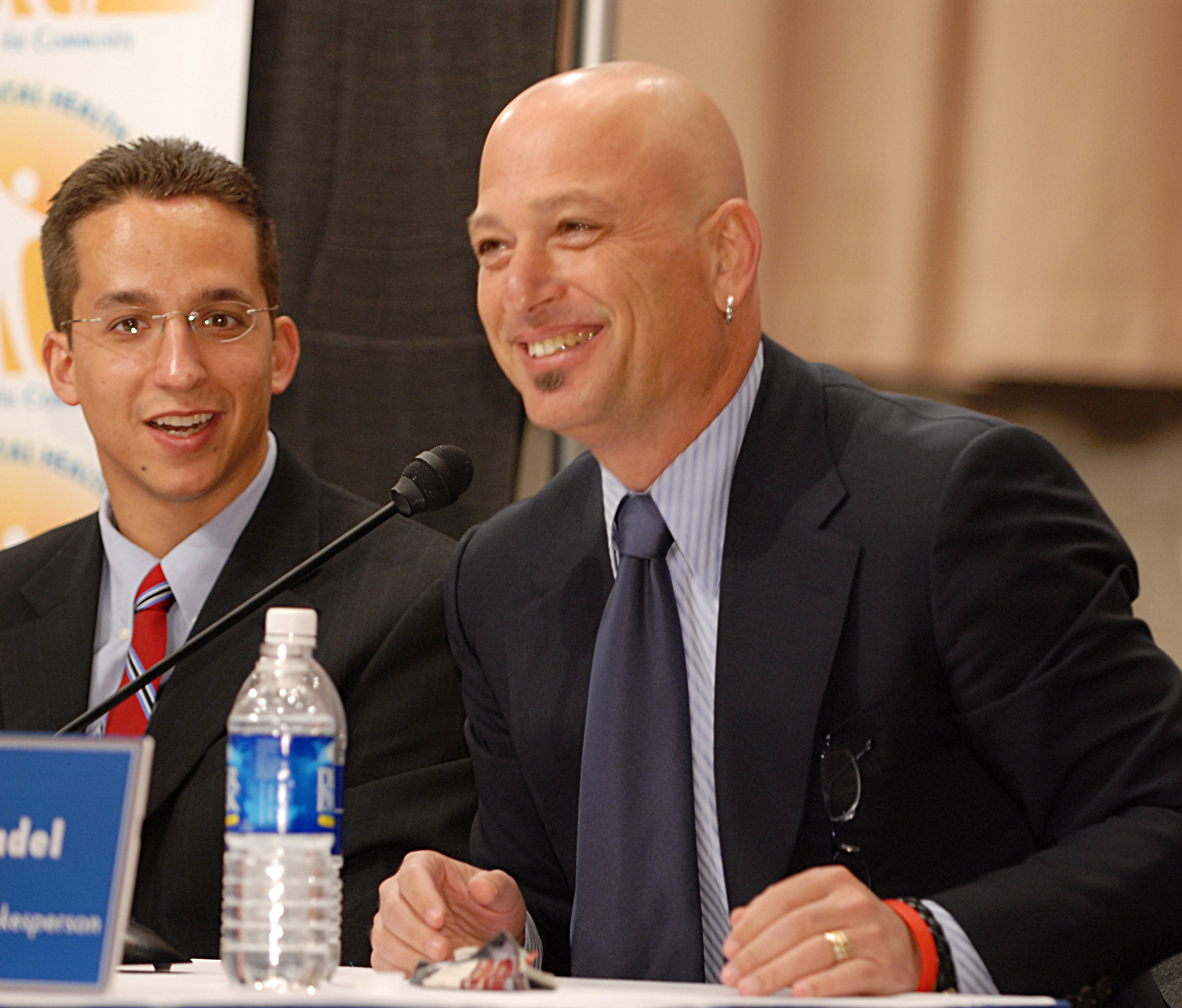
Mandel on Children's Mental Health Awareness Day, 2007

Mandel has spoken publicly about having OCD, which can take many forms, including mysophobia. Mandel's anxiety affects him to the point that he does not shake hands with anyone, including enthusiastic contestants on Deal or No Deal unless he is wearing latex gloves. Instead of shaking contestants' hands when they offer them, Mandel often opts to exchange fist bumps, put his hands on contestants' shoulders, or give an occasional hug. He once kissed a female contestant on the show for good luck despite his disorder. He now takes medicine to control his condition and even pokes fun at himself for it. On March 24, 2006, he revealed on The Howard Stern Show that his shaved head, which first appeared in 1999, is not related to natural hair loss but OCD. He stated that the lack of hair makes him feel cleaner. In the back yard of Mandel's house is a second, smaller house that he had built specifically to live in solitude when a family member is sick. During his appearance on Mad TV, Mandel and cast member Bobby Lee made fun of Mandel's condition. Mandel also confronted his germophobia in Season 4, Episode 1 of the Comedy Central series This Is Not Happening. The show aired on February 3, 2018.

Mandel was an avid viewer of the TV series Monk, the title character of which has extreme mysophobia and OCD. Mandel said the show de-stigmatized OCD and "makes me feel very not alone in the world." In the 2008 Monk episode "Mr. Monk Joins a Cult", Mandel guest-starred as a cult leader who breaks Monk out of his habit of using hand wipes, essentially curing him of the same condition Mandel suffers from in real life.

Mandel has reported a pivotal childhood experience during a family vacation in Florida that may have caused the manifestation of his mysophobia. During this trip, a sandfly laid its eggs in him, leading to the development of larvae that could be seen moving around just beneath the surface of his skin. The removal process was accompanied by considerable discomfort, with a dermatologist using liquid nitrogen to eliminate some of the larvae, and the rest being scrubbed out by his mother at home. The ordeal of discovering organisms growing beneath his skin left a profound impact on Mandel, who was only seven or eight years old at the time. Mandel says that recalling the event often evokes the sensation of organisms attempting to crawl underneath his skin.

While guest-hosting on Live with Regis and Kelly in 2005, Mandel had an altercation in which his hand sanitizer was seized by guest Rob Schneider, who condescendingly teased Mandel, stating he needed to 'get over' his phobia. Host Kelly Ripa admonished Schneider on-air, while also obtaining hand sanitizer for Mandel from an audience member. In September 2007, Mandel interviewed former NFL running back Marshall Faulk on NFL Network. Faulk asked him to shake hands, but Mandel refused, noting he would rather have the fist tap, as he does with Deal or No Deal contestants. Seconds later, Faulk subjected him to a "sneak attack" and shook his right hand. Mandel screamed and walked away from Faulk. He then washed his hands several times. On a guest appearance on Free Radio, Mandel explained that not only is he afraid of public bathrooms, but he is unable to use any bathroom other than his own.

In another America's Got Talent season 5 incident, Dan Sperry, a contestant on the YouTube quarterfinal depicted in episodes 21 and 22, dropped some dental floss that he had run through his neck as part of a magic act. He dropped the floss in Mandel's vicinity, prompting him to get up and run to the other side of the judges' table. Just before Sperry's next performance in the semifinals, Mandel admitted that it was "the most horrified" he'd been on the show and that his therapist "loves [Dan Sperry]" because there had been two extra sessions that week. During the premiere of season 6, juggler Frank Olivier grabbed Mandel's head to balance himself during a unicycle act. Despite receiving a buzzer from Mandel, Olivier moved on to the next round. Mandel refused to give Olivier any feedback during the judge's voting process.

During AGT's 10th-season premiere, contestant Chris Jones directly utilized Mandel's fear of germs as the subject of his hypnotism act. Under the post-hypnotic suggestion that Jones and the other judges were wearing latex gloves, Mandel shook the bare hands of all involved, which elicited shouts of amazement. After viewing the video of the act, Mandel said that he was "upset" and "somewhat betrayed" by the act, but his therapist subsequently said it was a good thing. Jones progressed to the Judge's Cuts where he was eliminated from the competition.

Mandel commented in 2011 that he has struggled with the condition since childhood but did not seek help until he was an adult:

I don't remember a time when I didn't feel there was an issue, but I wasn't diagnosed until adulthood. I've always felt a little bit different, and I always knew I wasn't as comfortable with life as everybody else seemed to be, but I didn't know what I could do about it. When I was a kid, I didn't know anybody who went to a psychiatrist. There was always a stigma attached to mental health issues. I think there still is. But now I'm taking care of myself.

Since May 2022, Mandel has partnered with NOCD, a mental healthcare company focused on increasing access to evidence-based treatment for OCD and related conditions.

=== Philanthropy ===
Mandel started his charitable foundation called Breakout the Masks, which helps provide personal protective equipment to healthcare workers fighting the COVID-19 pandemic. He is also involved in Bell's Let's Talk Day initiatives to help people struggling with mental health issues, and has raised money for the American Cancer Society and Trillium Health Partners for their mental health program.

== Use of name in scams ==
In 2025, scammers started using Mandel's name to promote an investment scam via social media, using fictitious "news articles" claiming that Mandel had been arrested following an interview.

== Filmography ==
=== Film ===
Film
Year	Title	Role	Notes
1981	Gas	Matt Lloyd	
1983	The Funny Farm	Larry Pound	
1984	Gremlins	Gizmo	Voice
1985	Where Did I Come From?	Narrator	Video short
1986	A Fine Mess	Dennis Powell	
1987	Walk Like a Man	Robert "Bobo" Shand	
1989	Little Monsters	Maurice	
1990	Gremlins 2: The New Batch	Gizmo	Voice
1994	Magic Kid 2	Moe	
2000	Tribulation	Jason Quincy	
2000	The Tangerine Bear	Jack	Voice
2000	Spin Cycle	Cody	
2002	Hansel and Gretel	The Sandman	
2004	Pinocchio 3000	Spencer T. Penguin	Voice
2005	The Aristocrats	Himself	Documentary
2007	Room Service	Joe Burns	Short film
2012	Committed	Himself	Documentary Director
2012	Noah	Inwar	Voice
2013	When Jews Were Funny	Himself	Documentary
2014	Gone South: How Canada Invented Hollywood	Himself	Documentary
2015	Being Canadian	Himself	Documentary
2017	Where Have You Gone, Lou DiMaggio?	Himself	Documentary
2017	Gilbert	Himself	Documentary
2017	Killing Hasselhoff	Himself	Uncredited
2017	On My Way Out: The Secret Life of Nani and Popi	—N/a	Documentary Executive producer
2019	I Am Richard Pryor	Himself	Documentary
2019	Christmas Magic	Himself	Video short
2020	Howie Mandel: But, Enough About Me	Himself	Documentary; Original title: The Howie Mandel Project
2020	John Pinette: I Go Now	Himself	Documentary
2022	Chop & Steele	Himself	Documentary
2023	Family Switch	Himself	Netflix film

=== Television ===
Television
Year	Title	Role	Notes
1982–1988	St. Elsewhere	Dr. Wayne Fiscus	137 episodes
1984	Match Game/Hollywood Squares Hour	Himself	Panelist
1984	School	Himself	TV movie
1984	The Princess Who Had Never Laughed	Weinerhead Waldo	
1984	Welcome to the Fun Zone	—N/a	TV movie Writer
1984–1985	Muppet Babies	Skeeter/Animal/Bunsen	Voice; 26 Episodes
1985	Howie Mandel: Live from Carnegie Mall	Himself	Executive producer Writer
1985	Little Muppet Monsters		Episode 1: "In the Beginning"
1985–1986	Faerie Tale Theatre	Wienerhead Waldo/Guest Interviewee	2 Episodes
1986	The Young Comedians All-Star Reunion	Himself	Writer - Uncredited
1986	David Letterman's 2nd Annual Holiday Film Festival	Locker Room Guy	Segment: "The Iceman Hummeth"; Uncredited
1987	Howie from Maui	Himself	TV movie Executive producer Writer
1990	Carol & Company	Steve	Season 1 episode 7: "Myna and the Messenger"
1990	Mother Goose Rock 'n' Rhyme	Humpty Dumpty	TV movie
1990–1991	Good Grief	Ernie Lapidus	Main; 13 Episodes
1990–1998	Bobby's World	Self/Bobby Generic/Howard Generic	81 episodes Executive producer Live action writer
1991	Howie and Rose	Howie Newman	TV pilot
1992	Howie	Various	Executive producer
1992	The Amazing Live Sea Monkeys	The Professor	11 episodes Executive producer
1993	David Copperfield	Mealy (Dog)	TV movie Voice
1994	In Search of Dr. Seuss	Sam-I-Am	Voice; Television movie
1995	Homicide: Life on the Street	Interior Decorator	Season 3 episode 9: "Every Mother's Son"
1995	Harrison Bergeron	Charlie	TV movie
1995	The Ben Stiller Show	Himself	Uncredited; Episode 13: "ZooTV at Night"
1995	Howie Mandel's Sunny Skies	Himself	Director; Executive producer (2 episodes); Host (2 episodes); Writer (1 episode)
1995	Highjacker	—N/a	TV short Executive producer
1995	Hello There	—N/a	TV short Executive producer
1995	Brunch	—N/a	TV short Executive producer
1996	Bless This House	Stuart Wyler	Episode 16: "Natural Born Parents"
1996	Lois & Clark: The New Adventures of Superman	Mr. Mxyzptlk	Season 4 episode 11: "Twas the Night Before Mxymas"
1997	The Outer Limits	Karl Durand	Season 3 episode 2: "Second Thoughts"
1998	The Nanny	Howie Mandel	Season 6 episode 8: "Making Whoopi"
1998–1999	The Howie Mandel Show	Host	Executive producer Writer; Segment director (1 episode)
1999	Sunset Beach	"Jerry Show" Announcer	Episode #1.560
1999	Jackie's Back!	Himself	TV movie
2000	Timothy Tweedle the First Christmas Elf	Comet	TV movie
2001	Spinning Out of Control	Marty Levinne	TV movie
2002–2003	Hollywood Squares	Himself	Center square 25 episodes
2003	Untitled Howie Mandel Project		TV movie
2004	Crown Heights	Rabbi	
2005	Hidden Howie: The Private Life of a Public Nuisance	Himself	Executive producer
2005	Punk'd	—N/a	Executive producer - Season 6 episode 3: "David Boreanaz, Kristin Cavallari & Terrell Owens"
2005–2019	Deal or No Deal	Host	
2006	Las Vegas	Himself	Season 3 episode 16: "Coyote Ugly"
2006	MADtv	Himself	Season 12 episode 2
2006	Studio 60 on the Sunset Strip	Himself	Episode 10: "B-12"
2006	The Great American Christmas	Narrator	TV movie
2006	The Great Polar Bear Adventure	Pupa	Voice; TV movie
2007	Medium	Himself	Season 3 episode 21: "Heads Will Roll"
2007	WWE Raw	Himself	Season 15 episode 9
2007	Deal or No Deal Canada	Host	
2007	The Bronx Bunny Show	Himself	Season 1 episode 6
2007	Sesame Street	Himself	Season 38 episode 9: "Sleeping Grouchy"
2007	My Name Is Earl	Himself	Season 3 episode 4: "The Frank Factor"
2008	Free Radio	Himself	Season 1 episode 3: "The New Intern"
2008	Monk	Ralph Roberts	2 episodes
2009	Howie Do It	Host	Main; 19 Episodes
2010	The Marriage Ref	Himself	Panelist; Season 1 episode 12: "Howie Mandel/Bette Midler/Craig Robinson"
2010	The Dating Guy	Brian Booyah	Voice; 2 episodes
2010–present	America's Got Talent	Judge	Season 5–Present
2011	Flipping Dixie	—N/a	Executive producer
2011	Take Two with Phineas and Ferb	Himself	Episode: "Howie Mandel"
2011	America's Most Wanted: America Fights Back	Himself	Voice; Season 25 episode 1: "50 Fugitives, 50 States Special Edition"
2011–2013	Mobbed	Host	Co-creator; Executive producer
2012	What Would You Do?	Himself	Season 6; episode 3
2012	The Big Bang Theory	Himself	Uncredited; Season 6 episode 4: "The Re-Entry Minimization"
2012	Take It All	Host	
2012	D.L. Hughley: The Endangered List	Himself	
2013	Betty White's Off Their Rockers	Himself	Season 2 episode 9
2013	Howie Mandel & Germ-Free Friends	Host	
2013	Fugget About It	FBI Agent Rick Chickmagnet	Voice; Season 2 episode 8: "The Fugly American"
2013–2014	Deal with It	Himself	Guest comedian - 4 episodes Executive producer
2014	Pioneers of Television	Himself	Season 4 episode 2: "Doctors and Nurses"
2014	Joke or Choke	—N/a	Executive producer
2014	Last Comic Standing	Himself	Guest mentor Season 8 episode 10: "Challenge 3 - Universal Tram Experience"
2015	Tanked	Himself	Season 9 episode 1: "Howie Mandel is the Brains Behind ATM"
2015	7 Days in Hell	Prince Edward, Duke of Kent	TV movie
2015	Impractical Jokers	Himself	Season 4 episode 24: "Live Punishment Special"
2015	Yidlife Crisis	Himself	Episode: "Yidlife Crisis vs. Howie Mandel"
2016	Roadtrip Nation	Himself	Episode: "Being You"
2017	Small Shots	Sy	2 episodes
2017	Superstore	Himself	Season 3 episode 1: "Grand Re-Opening"
2017	Caraoke Showdown	—N/a	Executive producer
2017–2020	Funny You Should Ask	Himself	57 Episodes
2018	This Is Not Happening	Himself	Writer; Season 4 episode 1: "Filth"
2018	Robot Chicken	Himself	Voice; Season 9 episode 7: "3 2 1 2 3 3 3, 2 2 2, 3...6 6?"
2018	Game Changers	Himself	Documentary
2018	Inside Jokes	Himself	Docu-series; 2 episodes
2018–2019	Howie Mandel's animals doing things	Himself	Director; Executive Producer
2019	Howie Mandel presents: Howie Mandel at the Howie Mandel Comedy Club	Himself	TV special Executive producer Writer
2019	The X Factor: Celebrity	Guest Judge	Auditions
2019	Harley Quinn	Himself	Voice; Season 1 episode 2: "A High Bar"
2019–2020	America's Got Talent: The Champions	Judge	
2020	The Search for Canada's Game Shows	Himself	Docu-series
2021	The game theory $1,000,000 challenge for St. Jude	Himself	Host
2022	Bullsh*t: The Game Show	Host	Netflix game show
2022–present	Canada's Got Talent	Judge	Season 2–present
2023	America's Got Talent: All-Stars	Judge	
2023	The Masked Singer	Himself/Rock Lobster	Season 9 contestant
2023	Game Changer	Guest Judge	Season 5 episode 12: "Game Changer: Battle Royale Pt. 3"
2024	America's Got Talent: Fantasy League	Judge/Mentor	Winning mentor
2024	Stupid Pet Tricks	Himself	Season 1 episode 9: "Fart Scapegoat"
2024–2025	Deal or No Deal Island	Himself - The Banker (season 1)	Season 1 Finale, Season 2 premiere, Also Executive Producer
2026	The Price Is Right Tonight	Himself	

=== Comedy specials ===
Specials
Year	Title	Role	Notes
1983	The First Howie Mandel Special	Himself	Producer; Writer
1987	Howie from Maui	Himself	Executive producer Writer
1997	Howie Mandel on Ice	Himself	Executive producer Writer
2006	Howie Mandel Live	Himself	Writer

=== Video games ===
Film
Year	Title	Role	Notes
1993	TuneLand - Starring Howie Mandel	Lil' Howie/Self	Voice
1995	Great Word Adventure	Lil' Howie	Voice
1996	Great Reading Adventure	Lil' Howie	Voice
1996	Great Math Adventure	Lil' Howie	Voice
2006	Deal or No Deal	Host	
2015	Lego Dimensions	Gizmo	Voice
