= Vitaly Zdorovetskiy =

Russian YouTuber (born 1992)

- Born: March 8, 1992 (age 34); Murmansk, Russia
- Occupation: YouTuber

Kick information
- Channel: Vitaly
- Years active: 2011–present
- Followers: 366 thousand

YouTube information
- Channel: VitalyzdTv
- Years active: 2011–present
- Genres: Pranking; comedy; vlog
- Subscribers: 10.1 million
- Views: 1.57 billion
- Last updated: April 25, 2026

Vitaly Zdorovetskiy (/vɪˈtæli zəˌdɒrəˈvjɛtski/ vih-TAL-ee zə-DORR-ə-VYET-skee; Russian: Вита́лий Здорове́цкий, IPA: [vʲɪˈtalʲɪj zdərɐˈvʲetskʲɪj]; born March 8, 1992), better known by his YouTube username VitalyzdTv, is a Russian YouTuber, nuisance streamer, and internet content creator. He immigrated to the United States with his mother in 2006 when he was 14 years of age, and shortly after became known for his YouTube pranks and publicity stunts, some of which have culminated in him being arrested and imprisoned.

From April 2025 to January 2026, Zdorovetskiy was detained by the Philippine government over criminal charges of unjust vexation (three counts), theft, and public harassment that were broadcast on his Kick livestreams in Metro Manila. In January 2026, he was deported to Russia and subsequently blacklisted from the Philippines.

== Early life ==
Zdorovetskiy was born on March 8, 1992, in Murmansk, Russia.

Zdorovetskiy moved to the United States as a teenager.

Shortly after turning 18, Zdorovetskiy took part in an adult film scene with pornographic actress Diamond Kitty for the adult entertainment company Bang Bros in 2011.

== Career ==
=== Pranks ===
In 2012, Zdorovetskiy received his first significant success, with the video "Miami Zombie Attack Prank!". Inspired by the cannibal attack of a homeless man in Miami in May 2012, he dressed up as a zombie and traveled to some of the poorest neighborhoods in Miami to scare random bystanders. The video, in which Zdorovetskiy chased mostly Black people, was described by some viewers as a racist attempt to humiliate the local black community.

Zdorovetskiy had been previously accused of humiliating black people in his videos after he published a prank video in which he approached 3 black males as a police officer, accusing one of being involved in a robbery, "and told all three they were getting a ticket for wearing their pants too low" but "that he would believe their innocence if they walked around a pole and said 'I didn't do it.'" After the video was recorded, Zdorovetskiy was arrested on two counts of impersonating a police officer.

On June 16, 2012, Zdorovetskiy and cameraman Jonathan Vanegas filmed the "Russian Hitman Prank". As part of the prank, Zdorovetskiy approached a Boca Raton Resort man and informed him they had 60 seconds to get away from a briefcase he placed on the ground. After Zdorovetskiy revealed the whole thing to be a prank and that there was a hidden camera nearby, the man started attacking him and his partner and called the police. Zdorovetskiy was arrested by Boca Raton police department, facing a maximum of 15 years in prison on charges related to bomb threats. The charges were eventually dismissed.

On July 20, 2013, Zdorovetskiy released the video "Extreme Homeless Man Makeover", in which he befriends a homeless man named Martin and provides him with new clothes and a hotel room. The video posting resulted in a job offer that Martin accepted. He was also reunited with his wife. The project also included an attempt to raise money to have Martin's teeth fixed, for which Zdorovetskiy was able to raise about $10,000 online. The fundraising campaign was canceled before it was completed, because of Zdorovetskiy's criminal history. However, Zdorovetskiy received several offers from surgeons to do the dental work for free. The surgery and the video story was featured on television news casts including the Good Day LA Fox morning show.

His 2013 "Gold Digger Prank", featuring a woman who rejects his advances until she believes he drives a Lamborghini Gallardo sports car, generated more than 18 million views in its first week of posting. On October 15, 2014, Zdorovetskiy pulled a prank which involved himself dressing up as Leatherface from The Texas Chainsaw Massacre franchise, pretending to saw off the legs of Hanhart syndrome patient Nick Santonastasso with a chainsaw in front of unsuspecting witnesses. While being in Croatia in 2015, he harassed former Croatian prime minister Ivo Sanader, while Sanader was leaving Remetinec prison where he was serving his sentence for corruption charges by jumping on Sanader's car while he and his lawyers were inside.

Zdorovetskiy has been accused of staging his YouTube pranks. In November 2015, Lionsgate officially acquired worldwide distribution rights for a film in which Zdorovetskiy starred, Natural Born Pranksters.

After facing censorship and demonetization from YouTube due to their strict guidelines against explicit content, Zdorovetskiy launched Vitaly Uncensored in 2015 as an independent platform where he could share uncensored versions of his pranks and other NSFW videos without any limitations or restrictions. During the 2019 Champions League final his then girlfriend Kinsey Wolanski ran onto the pitch wearing a black swimsuit that had printed Vitaly Uncensored in white. The advertising value of the stunt was measured in couple of millions of dollars. In 2020 he launched the platform Vitaly Girls.

=== Publicity stunts and arrests ===
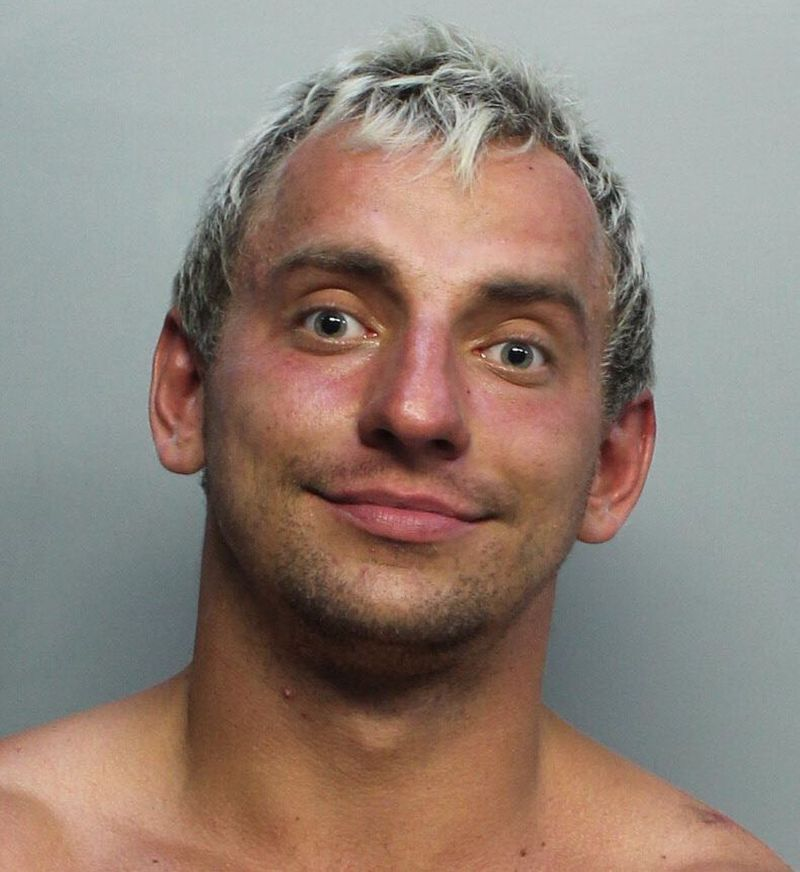
Mugshot of Zdorovetskiy's arrest under the aggravated battery charge, 2020

In July 2014, Zdorovetskiy attracted major media attention after invading the field during the 2014 FIFA World Cup Final between Germany and Argentina in Brazil.

On May 25, 2016, he was arrested for trespassing after climbing the Hollywood Sign, as part of a video stunt.

On June 10, 2016, he was again arrested for streaking during Game 4 of the NBA Finals between the Cleveland Cavaliers and the Golden State Warriors.

On October 29, 2017, during the bottom of the 7th inning in Game 5 of the 2017 World Series, he was arrested for running onto the field at Minute Maid Park shortly after Carlos Correa of the Houston Astros hit a home run.

In January 2020, Zdorovetskiy was arrested and spent five days in an Egyptian jail after climbing the Pyramids of Giza.

On April 12, 2020, he was arrested and later charged for aggravated battery by Miami Beach Police. According to law-enforcement, Zdorovetskiy allegedly tackled a female jogger and struck her multiple times in the head and chest, leaving her with a 2-inch cut above her right eye that required stitches. The woman stated that she did not know who he was. Zdorovetskiy was released from custody after posting a $7,500 bond.

==== Philippines ====
===== Arrest and detention =====
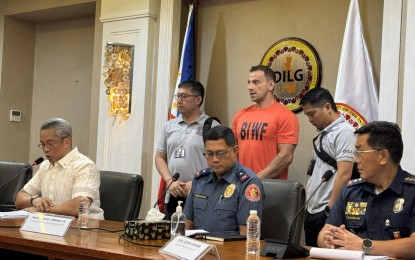
Interior Secretary Jonvic Remulla presents Vitaly Zdorovetskiy at a press conference on April 7, 2025.

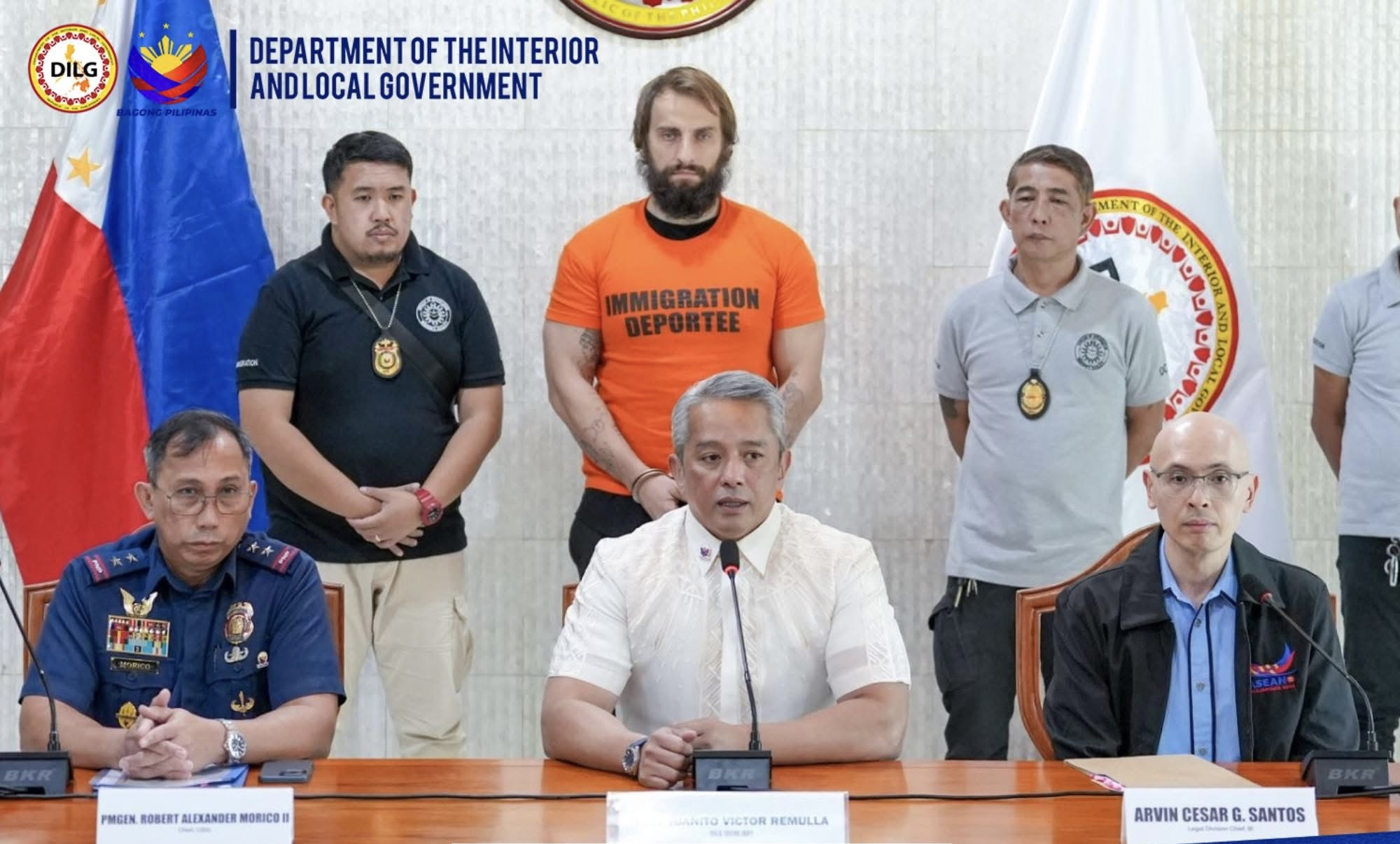
Press conference by the Bureau of Immigration discussing the deportation procedures for Zdorovetskiy (in orange) on January 7, 2026

On April 2, 2025, Zdorovetskiy was arrested by Philippine authorities after livestreaming on Kick a series of incidents in which he harassed people in public at Bonifacio Global City and other parts of Metro Manila. During his livestreams, he was seen stealing a patrol motorcycle from a security guard, repeatedly taking a security guard's cap, stealing an electric fan from a restaurant and bringing it into a hotel, and threatening to rob a woman in public. Additionally, he also recorded himself jumping onto the roof of a moving jeepney, harassing motorcycle riders, and driving a tricycle recklessly in Manila that resulted in the injury of one rider as well as trespassing into a McDonald's kitchen and stealing from it. Zdorovetskiy was also accused of making derogatory comments and gestures toward a surfing instructor in Boracay and encouraging viewers to review bomb their local business. His deportation was put on hold after being labeled by the Bureau of Immigration (BI) as an "undesirable alien" and by the Department of the Interior and Local Government (DILG) as a "flight risk". Following his arrest, he was detained at the Bureau of Immigration Bicutan Detention Center in Camp Bagong Diwa, Taguig, pending several cases filed against him under Philippine law.

In May 2025, Zdorovetskiy's legal team pleaded with Interior Secretary Jonvic Remulla to drop the charges filed against him, citing "mental health reasons". The request was declined by Remulla. In June 2025, Zdorovetskiy was reportedly facing three counts of unjust vexation, for which he could serve a prison sentence of up to 18 months. Remulla also stated at the time that Zdorovetskiy would no longer be deported, as both the Russian and United States governments have declined to accept him. Following his deportation being put on hold, Zdorovetskiy was transferred to the custody of the Bureau of Jail Management and Penology (BJMP) in June 2025.

===== Deportation and corruption allegations =====
In January 2026, the Bureau of Immigration announced that Zdorovetskiy had his criminal cases resolved and the process for his deportation was resumed. He was deported to Russia on January 17, 2026, aboard an IrAero flight to Irkutsk. Despite holding permanent resident status in the United States, he was deported to Russia on the basis of his Russian citizenship and was subsequently placed on an immigration blacklist, barring him from legally reentering the Philippines.

On January 21, 2026, Zdorovetskiy posted photos and videos of himself that he claimed were taken during his detention at Camp Bagong Diwa. In a livestream appearance with online personality Adin Ross, he alleged that he had been held in isolation for three months and subjected to inhumane conditions. He further claimed that he was able to record video footage inside the detention facility by bribing guards, stating that he had "vlogged the whole experience" and intended to "expose the corruption" he witnessed.

Following the circulation of his posts, the BI announced that a warden has submitted a courtesy resignation, which was accepted, while two deputy wardens and three other BI officials have been relieved from their posts in connection with the incident. Palace Press Officer Claire Castro stated that the use of mobile phones by detainees is only for communicating with family members and that using one to make videos was not authorized by the facility personnel. Castro confirmed that Philippine president Bongbong Marcos had ordered an investigation into the reported lapses. The BI later stated that it had already investigated the smuggling of electronic devices into the detention facility in June or July 2025, resulting in the confiscation of smuggled items and the relief of negligent personnel in November 2025.

After the livestream gained attention, the BI rejected Zdorovetskiy's allegations of inhumane conditions in detention as "rage-bait". Interior Secretary Remulla also warned that the government could pursue charges and seek Zdorovetskiy's extradition if proven that he had bribed personnel inside the detention facility.

=== Vigilantism ===
Zdorovetskiy has livestreamed multiple vigilante operations performed by himself and other online celebrities on Kick. During one stream alongside controversial online celebrity Sneako, he lured a person, who he alleged had been having sexual conversations with a fictional person under the age of 18, into an apartment that he was renting. After Zdorovetskiy surprised the man, coming out of the back room, he decided not to call the police and instead started shaving the person's hair and eyebrows in a way that, Zdorovetskiy said, made him look similar to a clown, before telling the man that he could leave the apartment if he ate his own pubic hair. No arrests were made related to the incident.

Zdorovetskiy performed another vigilante operation in May 2024 in Southwest Miami-Dade, during which he surprised a person he had accused of sexual misconduct with a fake alligator. The sting operation was criticized by local police authorities, Miami-Dade Police Department detective Andre Martin stated that "You have no idea what these people are capable of when they are inserted into desperate situations... You don't know if they’re armed with weapons, you don't know what they're willing to do." In the same month, a group including Zdorovetskiy and other vigilantes publicly accused a middle-aged man of attempting to meet with a 15-year-old minor for sex in a Publix store. The group pursued the man while blasting an emergency sound with their megaphone as he cringed and covered his ears. They were eventually ushered out of the facility by the City of Miami police and no arrests related to the incident was made.

He collaborated with rapper YG in another July vigilante operation, which some social media users have described as staged. Zdorovetskiy also stated that he paid American rapper Quavo $300,000 to appear in another operation, but that Quavo had taken the money and failed to appear. Zdorovetskiy described Quavo's actions as a "black people thing". Also in July, another operation alongside The Game and Wack 100 culminated in the former punching a man that the vigilante group had accused of attempting to meet a 15-year-old minor. HotNewsHipHop wrote that is not clear if the sting operation was staged.

Another operation with Zdorovetskiy and Ty Dolla Sign culminated with a man in his 70s being punched in the face, falling on the ground and hitting his head. In November 2024, a Hollywood screenwriter filed a lawsuit against Zdorovetskiy. The plaintiff stated, referring to Zdorovetskiy and his vigilante group, that "this gang wrongfully accuses their victims of pedophilia by filming them with men in their 20s and then after-the-fact claiming the men are minors". The plaintiff also stated that he was targeted as a gay man who worked in the entertainment industry.

==== April 2026 controversy ====
In April 2026, while live streaming an episode of his series Catching Child Predators, Zdorovetskiy falsely accused a man of trying to meet up with a purportedly underage decoy for sex. Zdorovetskiy later on admitted that it was a false accusation, saying it was "a mistake that I deeply regret." The man who was accused released a statement on Twitter detailing how the false accusation had negatively affected his life, including being subject to harassment and reputational damage. Zdorovetskiy's Kick channel was also suspended following the incident.

== Exhibition boxing record ==
3 fights	1 win	0 losses
By knockout	1	0
Draws	1	
No contests	1	

No.	Result	Record	Opponent	Type	Round, time	Date	Location	Notes
3	NC	1–0–1 (1)	Larry Wheels	NC	—N/a	22 Aug 2026	Brand Risk Warehouse, Miami, Florida, US	
2	Win	1–0–1	MoDeen	TKO	1 (3), 2:58	23 Mar 2024	Worldwide Stages, Nashville, Tennessee, US	
1	Draw	0–0–1	Kristen Hanby	MD	4	5 Mar 2022	Wembley Arena, London, England	
