= Sumerian Records discography =

This is a list of releases on the Sumerian Records label.

== Current artists ==
=== After the Burial ===
Album details	Peak chart positions					
Album details	US	US Heat	US Indie	US Hard Rock	US Rock	US Alt
Rareform: Studio album; Release date: July 22, 2008	—	—	—	—	—	—
In Dreams: Studio album; Release date: November 23, 2010	—	3	27	12	—	—
This Life Is All We Have: EP; Release date: April 30, 2013	—	—	—	—	—	—

=== Animals as Leaders ===
Album details	Peak chart positions					
Album details	US	US Heat	US Indie	US Hard Rock	US Rock	US Alt
The Joy of Motion: Studio album; Release date: March 24, 2014	—	—	—	—	—	—

=== Asking Alexandria ===
Album details	Peak chart positions							
Album details	US	US Heat	US Indie	US Hard Rock	US Rock	UK	AUS	CAN
Stand Up and Scream: Studio album; Release date: September 15, 2009	170	4	—	—	—	—	—	—
Life Gone wild: EP; Release date: December 21, 2010	—	2	13	13	42	—	—	—
Reckless & Relentless: Studio album; Release date: April 5, 2011	9	—	3	2	4	98	30	—
Stepped Up and Scratched: Remix Album; Release date: November 21, 2011	—	—	14	7	26	—	—	—
Under the Influence: A Tribute to the Legends of Hard Rock: EP; Release date: November 28, 2012	—	—	—	—	—	—	—	—
From Death to Destiny: Studio album; Release date: August 6, 2013	5	—	1	1	2	28	11	14
The Black (Asking Alexandria album): Studio album; Release date: March 25, 2016	—	—	—	—	—	—	—	—
Asking Alexandria (album): Studio album; Release date: December 15, 2017	—	—	—	—	—	—	—	—

=== Betraying the Martyrs ===
Album details	Peak chart positions					
Album details	US	US Heat	US Indie	US Hard Rock	US Rock	US Alt
Breathe in Life: Studio album; Release date: September 13, 2011	—	—	—	—	—	—

=== Body Count ===
Album details	Peak chart positions					
Album details	US	US Heat	US Indie	US Hard Rock	US Rock	US Alt
Manslaughter: Studio album; Release date: June 10, 2014	—	—	—	—	—	—

=== Borgore ===
Album details	Peak chart positions					
Album details	US	US Heat	US Indie	US Hard Rock	US Rock	US Alt
Delicious: Extended Play; Release date: June 6, 2011	—	—	—	—	—	—
The filthiest Hits ...so far: Compilation album; Release date: July 26, 2011	—	—	—	—	—	—

=== Born of Osiris ===
Album details	Peak chart positions					
Album details	US	US Heat	US Indie	US Hard Rock	US Rock	US Alt
The New Reign: Extended Play; Release date: October 2, 2007	—	—	—	—	—	—
A Higher Place: Studio album; Release date: July 7, 2009	73	—	8	10	27	—
The Discovery: Studio album; Release date: March 22, 2011	87	—	17	6	23	—
Tomorrow We Die ∆live: Studio album; Release date: August 20, 2013	27	—	8	3	10	—

Add Soul Sphere, The Simulation, Angel or Alien, and Through Shadows

=== Dead Letter Circus ===
Album details	Peak chart positions						
Album details	US	US Heat	US Indie	US Hard Rock	US Rock	US Alt	AUS
This is the Warning: Studio album; Release date: May 14, 2010	—	—	—	—	—	—	2

=== The Dillinger Escape Plan ===
Album details	Peak chart positions					
Album details	US	US Heat	US Indie	US Hard Rock	US Rock	US Alt
One of Us Is the Killer: Studio album; Release date: May 14, 2013	25	—	4	1	—	—

=== Evan Brewer ===
Album details	Peak chart positions					
Album details	US	US Heat	US Indie	US Hard Rock	US Rock	US Alt
Alone: Studio album; Release date: June 28, 2011	—	—	—	—	—	—
Your Itinerary: Studio album; Release date: July 16, 2013	—	—	—	—	—	—

=== The Faceless ===
Album details	Peak chart positions					
Album details	US	US Heat	US Indie	US Hard Rock	US Rock	US Alt
Akeldama: Studio album; Release date: November 14, 2006	—	—	—	—	—	—
Planetary Duality: Studio album; Release date: November 11, 2008	119	2	10	19	—	—
Autotheism: Studio album; Release date: August 14, 2012	50	—	13	3	18	—

=== The Francesco Artusato Project ===
Album details	Peak chart positions					
Album details	US	US Heat	US Indie	US Hard Rock	US Rock	US Alt
Chaos and the Primordial: Studio album; Release date: June 28, 2011	—	—	—	—	—	—

=== The HAARP Machine ===
Album details	Peak chart positions					
Album details	US	US Heat	US Indie	US Hard Rock	US Rock	US Alt
Disclosure: Studio album; Release date: October 15, 2012	—	6	49	17	—	—

=== I See Stars ===
Album details	Peak chart positions					
Album details	US	US Heat	US Indie	US Hard Rock	US Rock	US Alt
3-D: Studio album; Release date: April 14, 2009	176	5	22	—	—	—
The End of the World Party: Studio album; Release date: February 22, 2011	144	1	18	—	37	23
Digital Renegade: Studio album; Release date: March 13, 2012	45	—	9	—	15	—
Renegades Forever: Remix Album; Release date: May 28, 2013	—	—	—	—	—	—

=== I, the Breather ===
Album details	Peak chart positions					
Album details	US	US Heat	US Indie	US Hard Rock	US Rock	US Alt
These Are My Sins: Studio album; Release date: December 7, 2010	—	39	—	—	—	—
Truth and Purpose: Studio album; Release date: February 28, 2012	—	11	36	15	—	—

=== Mestis ===
Album details	Peak chart positions					
Album details	US	US Heat	US Indie	US Hard Rock	US Rock	US Alt
Basal Ganglia: EP; Release date: November 27, 2012	—	—	—	—	—	—

=== Periphery ===
Album details	Peak chart positions							
Album details	US	US Heat	US Indie	US Hard Rock	US Rock	US Alt	AUS	CAN
Periphery: Studio album; Release date: April 20, 2010	128	2	18	12	39	—	—	-
Icarus: EP; Release date: April 19, 2011	—	—	—	—	—	—	—	-
Periphery II: This Time It's Personal: Studio album; Release date: July 3, 2012	44	—	6	3	17	—	46	89
Clear: EP; Release date: January 28, 2014	—	—	—	—	—	—	—	-
Juggernaut: Alpha: Studio album; Release date: January 27, 2015	—	—	—	—	—	—	—	-
Juggernaut: Omega: Studio album; Release date: January 27, 2015	—	—	—	—	—	—	—	-
Periphery III: Select Difficulty: Studio album; Release date: July 22, 2016	22	2	8		22	39		57

=== Poppy ===
Album details	Peak chart positions							
Album details	US	US indie	US rock	AUS Dig.	SCO	UK Dig.	UK Indie	UK Rock
I Disagree: Studio album; Release date: January 10, 2020	130	12	15	19	67	37	11	1
Music to Scream To: Soundtrack album; Release date: October 20, 2020	—N/a							
A Very Poppy Christmas: Extended play; Release date: December 1, 2020	—N/a							
Eat (NXT Soundtrack): Extended play; Release date: June 8, 2021	—N/a							
Flux: Studio album; Release date: September 24, 2021	—N/a (Note: Flux did not enter the Billboard 200, but peaked at number 60 on the Top Current Albums Sales chart.)					46	40	16
Zig: Studio album; Release date: October 27, 2023	TBA							

=== Stick to Your Guns ===
Album details	Peak chart positions					
Album details	US	US Heat	US Indie	US Hard Rock	US Rock	US Alt
For what It's worth: Studio album; Release date: February 20, 2007	—	—	—	—	—	—
The Hope Division: Studio album; Release date: June 1, 2010	—	5	33	20	—	—
Diamond: Studio album; Release date: March 27, 2012	116	1	20	11	30	—
The Story So Far Vs. Stick To Your Guns: Split; Release date: June 15, 2013	—	—	—	—	—	—

=== Stray from the Path ===
Album details	Peak chart positions					
Album details	US	US Heat	US Indie	US Hard Rock	US Rock	US Alt
Villains: Studio album; Release date: May 9, 2008	—	—	—	—	—	—
Make Your Own History: Studio album; Release date: October 26, 2009	—	—	—	—	—	—
Rising Sun: Studio album; Release date: August 30, 2011	—	19	—	—	—	—

=== TRAM ===
Album details	Peak chart positions					
Album details	US	US Heat	US Indie	US Hard Rock	US Rock	US Alt
Lingua Franca: Studio album; Release date: February 28, 2012	—	—	—	—	—	—

=== Upon a Burning Body ===
Album details	Peak chart positions					
Album details	US	US Heat	US Indie	US Hard Rock	US Rock	US Alt
The World is Ours: Studio album; Release date: April 6, 2010	—	28	—	—	—	—
Red. White. Green.: Studio album; Release date: April 10, 2012	105	1	20	11	35	—

=== Veil of Maya ===
Album details	Peak chart positions					
Album details	US	US Heat	US Indie	US Hard Rock	US Rock	US Alt
The Common Man's Collapse: Studio album; Release date: April 1, 2008	—	—	—	—	—	—
[id]: Studio album; Release date: April 6, 2010	107	1	16	7	33	—
Eclipse: Studio album; Release date: February 28, 2012	76	—	7	3	19	—
Matriarch: Release date: May 12, 2015; Label: Sumerian Records	58	-	3	2	5	

== Various artists ==
Album details	Peak chart positions					
Album details	US	US Heat	US Indie	US Hard Rock	US Rock	US Alt
Summer Slaughter Tour: DVD; Release date: August 19, 2008	—	—	—	—	—	—
Sumerian Ceremonials (Florence + The Sphinx): Cover album; Release date: May 13, 2014	—	—	—	—	—	—

== Former artists ==
=== ABACABB ===
Album details	Peak chart positions					
Album details	US	US Heat	US Indep	US Hard Rock	US Rock	US Alt
Survivalist: Studio album; Release date: January 20, 2009	—	—	—	—	—	—

=== Agraceful ===
Album details	Peak chart positions					
Album details	US	US Heat	US Indep	US Hard Rock	US Rock	US Alt
Great I Am: Studio album; Release date: August 19, 2008	—	—	—	—	—	—

=== Bizzy Bone ===
Album details	Peak chart positions					
Album details	US	US Heat	US Indep	US Hard Rock	US Rock	US Alt
Crossroads: 2010: Studio album; Release date: August 24, 2010	—	—	—	—	—	—

=== Blackguard ===
Album details	Peak chart positions					
Album details	US	US Heat	US Indep	US Hard Rock	US Rock	US Alt
Profugus Mortis: Studio album; Release date: April 28, 2009	—	—	—	—	—	—

=== Broadcast the Nightmare ===
Album details	Peak chart positions					
Album details	US	US Heat	US Indep	US Hard Rock	US Rock	US Alt
Twenty Twelve: Studio album; Release date: April 14, 2009	—	—	—	—	—	—

=== Capture the Crown ===
Album details	Peak chart positions					
Album details	US	US Heat	US Indie	US Hard Rock	US Rock	US Alt
'Til Death: Studio album; Release date: December 18, 2012	—	7	—	—	—	—

=== Circle of Contempt ===
Album details	Peak chart positions					
Album details	US	US Heat	US Indep	US Hard Rock	US Rock	US Alt
Artifacts in Motion: Studio album; Release date: November 23, 2009	—	—	—	—	—	—
Entwine The Threads: EP; Release date: December 11, 2012	—	—	—	—	—	—

=== Conducting from the Grave ===
Album details	Peak chart positions					
Album details	US	US Heat	US Indep	US Hard Rock	US Rock	US Alt
When Legends Become Dust: Studio album; Release date: February 17, 2009	—	—	—	—	—	—
Revenants: Studio album; Release date: October 25, 2010	—	—	—	—	—	—

=== Creature Feature ===
Album details	Peak chart positions					
Album details	US	US Heat	US Indep	US Hard Rock	US Rock	US Alt
The greatest Show unearthed: Studio album; Release date: October 30, 2007	—	—	—	—	—	—

=== Enfold Darkness ===
Album details	Peak chart positions					
Album details	US	US Heat	US Indie	US Hard Rock	US Rock	US Alt
Our cursed Rapture: Studio album; Release date: November 23, 2009	—	—	—	—	—	—

=== Fellsilent ===
Album details	Peak chart positions					
Album details	US	US Heat	US Indep	US Hard Rock	US Rock	US Alt
The Hidden Words: Studio album; Release date: March 3, 2009	—	—	—	—	—	—

=== Kenotia ===
Album details	Peak chart positions					
Album details	US	US Heat	US Indep	US Hard Rock	US Rock	US Alt
You've Dug Your Grave, Now Lie in It: Studio album; Release date: October 30, 2007	—	—	—	—	—	—

=== Lower than Atlantis ===
Album details	Peak chart positions					
Album details	US	US Heat	US Indep	US Hard Rock	US Rock	US Alt
World Record: Studio album; Release date: April 25, 2011	—	—	—	—	—	—

=== Make Me Famous ===
Album details	Peak chart positions					
Album details	US	US Heat	US Indep	US Hard Rock	US Rock	US Alt
It's Now or Never: Studio album; Release date: March 26, 2012	151	5	26	13	37	—

=== Sea of Treachery ===
Album details	Peak chart positions					
Album details	US	US Heat	US Indep	US Hard Rock	US Rock	US Alt
At Daggers Drawn: Studio album; Release date: April 29, 2008	—	—	—	—	—	—

=== Structures ===
Album details	Peak chart positions					
Album details	US	US Heat	US Indie	US Hard Rock	US Rock	US Alt
Divided By: Studio album; Release date: October 24, 2011	–	12	—	—	—	—
Life Through a Window: Studio album; Release date: May 13, 2014	–	9	–	21	—	—

=== Too Pure to Die ===
Album details	Peak chart positions					
Album details	US	US Heat	US Indep	US Hard Rock	US Rock	US Alt
Confidence and Consequence: Studio album; Release date: November 14, 2006	—	—	—	—	—	—
