= Taylor Larson =

American record producer (born 1988)

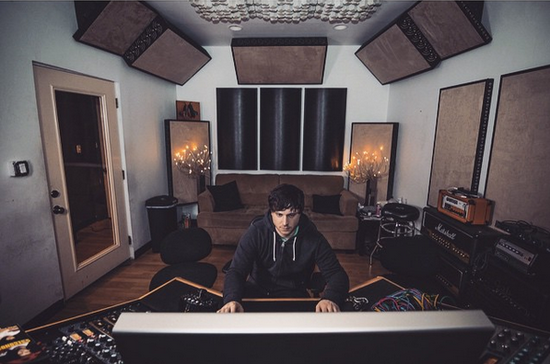
- Larson in his recording studio in Bethesda, Maryland, 2015

Background information
- Born: April 28, 1988 (age 38)
- Origin: Bethesda, Maryland, U.S.
- Genres: Heavy metal, pop, alternative rock, indie rock
- Occupations: Record producer, mixer, engineer
- Years active: 2009–present
- Formerly of: From First to Last

Taylor Larson (born April 28, 1988) is an American record producer, mixer, and audio engineer. He has produced, engineered, and/or mixed tracks for Asking Alexandria, Periphery, From First to Last, I See Stars, Veil of Maya, Within Temptation, the Dangerous Summer, Conditions, and Sky Eats Airplane. He is the guitarist of the Evening.

== Production work and education ==
Larson has participated in music-production education and mixing instruction. In 2017, he appeared on the Nail the Mix platform, where he provided an in-depth breakdown of his mixing approach for "Into the Fire" by Asking Alexandria, demonstrating techniques used on the commercially released track.

Larson is also the founder of the software and virtual-instrument company MixWave, which develops drum libraries, guitar and bass amp simulations, and other music-production tools. His work with MixWave has been profiled by industry publications including Mixonline and Music Connection, which have highlighted his monitoring environment and approach to achieving mix consistency.

Larson has also collaborated with audio-software developers on signature sound libraries. He worked with Drumforge to release the "Drumshotz: Larson + Holland" sample pack, created in partnership with drummer Luke Holland.

== Production discography ==
Year recorded	Artist	Title	Label	Role
2008	Bela Valore	To End All Righteous Days	Self-released	Produced/Engineered/Mixed
2010	Sky Eats Airplane	The Sound of Symmetry	Equal Vision Records	Produced/Engineered
2011	Everyone Dies in Utah	Seeing Clearly	Tragic Hero Records	Produced/Engineered/Mixed
2011	Of Legends	Stranded	Season of Mist	Produced/Engineered/Mixed
2011	Life on Repeat	Struggle + Sleep	Equal Vision	Produced/Engineered/Mixed
2011	The Dangerous Summer	War Paint	Hopeless Records	Additional Engineering
2011	Us, From Outside	Revived	Tragic Hero	Produced/Mixed
2012	I, the Breather	Truth and Purpose	Sumerian Records	Produced/Engineering
2012	Lithium Dawn	Aion	Self-released	Mastered/Engineering
2012	Periphery	Periphery II: This Time It's Personal	Sumerian	Produced/Engineered/Mixed
2012	Everyone Dies in Utah	Polarities	Tragic Hero	Produced/Mixed
2012	Honour Crest	Metrics	Indianola Records	Mastered
2012	Onward to Olympas	Indicator	Facedown Records	Produced
2012	Very Americans	Back from the Dead (7")	Ship Out Recordings	Mastered
2013	Epitome of the Weak	A New Shore (EP)	Self-released	Mixed/Mastered
2013	Conditions	Full of War	eOne Music	Engineered/Mixed/Mastered
2013	The Gabriel Construct	Interior City	Independent	Mixed/Mastered
2013	Battleghost	Don't Be a Hero (EP)	Independent	Mastered
2013	Nick Johnston	In a Locked Room on the Moon	Self-released	Mixed/Mastered/Engineering
2013	Life on Repeat	Blacklisted	Equal Vision	Produced/Engineered/Mixed/Mastered
2013	Being	Anthropocene	Self-released	Produced/Mixed/Mastered
2014	Periphery	Clear	Sumerian	Produced/Engineered/Mixed/Mastered (tracks 3 & 5)
2014	Enstride	The Sound That Silence Makes (EP)	Self-released	Mixed/Mastered/Engineered
2014	Minshara	iO	Polar Phat Records	Produced/Engineered/Mixed/Mastered
2014	Youth in Revolt	Love Is A Liars Game (EP)	Outerloop Records	Produced/Engineered/Mixed/Mastered
2014	Capture The Crown	Reign of Terror	Artery Recordings	Produced/Engineered/Mixed/Mastered
2014	Darkest Hour	Darkest Hour	Sumerian	Produced/Engineered/Mixed/Mastered
2014	Toothgrinder	Schizophrenic Jubilee (EP)	Spinefarm Records	Produced/Mixed/Mastered
2014	Various Artists	Punk Goes Pop Volume 6	Fearless Records	Produced/Engineered/Mixed/Mastered (track 8 "Royals")
2015	Periphery	Juggernaut: Alpha	Sumerian	Engineer
2015	Periphery	Juggernaut: Omega	Sumerian	Engineer
2015	Awaken I Am	Shields and Crowns	Shock Records, Zestone Records	Produced
2015	From First To Last	Dead Trees	Sumerian	Produced/Engineered/Mixed/Mastered/Guitars
2015	Veil of Maya	Matriarch	Sumerian	Produced/Engineered/Mixed/Mastered
2015	Nekrogoblikon	Heavy Meta	Mystery Box	Mastered
2015	Everlit	Renovate (EP)	RDC Music Group	Produced
2015	Ass Life	A Couple Cold Ones	Ephemerol Night Terrors	Mastered
2015	Get Scared	Demons	Fearless	Mixed/Mastered
2015	The Primals	The Primals	Independent	Mastered
2015	Ice Nine Kills	Every Trick in the Book	Fearless	Writer (track 4 "The Plot Sickens")
2015	Lithium Dawn	Tearing Back the Veil I: Ascension	Self-released	Mastered
2016	Toothgrinder	Nocturnal Masquerade	Spinefarm	Produced/Engineered/Mixed
2016	Cedar Green	The One You Feed (EP)	Self-released	Produced/Writer
2016	I See Stars	Treehouse	Sumerian	Mixed/Mastered (tracks 1–3, 5, 7–8, 10–12)
2016	Periphery	Periphery III: Select Difficulty	Sumerian	Vocal Production/Vocal Mixing
2016	Jason Richardson	I	Independent	Produced/Engineered/Mixed/Mastered
2016	Famous Last Words	The Incubus	Revival Recordings	Produced/Engineered/Mixed/Mastered
2016	Memphis May Fire	This Light I Hold	Rise Records	Mastered
2017	Youth in Revolt	The Broken	Outerloop	Produced/Mixed/Mastered
2017	Mycelia	Dawn	Self-released	Mixed/Mastered
2017	Curses	Chapter I: Introspect	Imminence Records	Produced/Mixed/Mastered
2017	Periphery	"Shadow of the Day" (Linkin Park cover)	-	Production/Engineering/Guitars/Mixed/Mastered
2017	Curses	"Party Monster" (The Weeknd cover)	Imminence	Produced/Mixed/Mastered
2017	Awaken I Am	Blind Love	Victory Records	Produced/Engineered/Mixed/Mastered
2017	Endur	American Parasite	Sumerian	Co-produced
2017	Toothgrinder	Phantom Amour	Spinefarm	Produced/Engineered/Mixed/Mastered
2017	Asking Alexandria	Asking Alexandria	Sumerian	Mixed
2018	Curses	"Rest"	Imminence	Produced/Mixed/Mastered
2018	Thrillchaser	A Lot Like Love	Self-released	Produced/Mixed/Mastered
2018	Les Rats d'Swompe	Vivre en ville	Productions CRÉTAC	Mastered
2018	Foxera	"Memories" (feat. Tilian)	Self-released	Produced
2018	Unprocessed	Covenant	SPV, Long Branch Records	
2018	The Word Alive	Violent Noise	Fearless	Mastered
2018	Neverkept	"Vertigo"	N/A	
2018	For a Life Unburdened	Contempt/Clarity	FALU Music Corp	Produced/Mixed/Mastered
2018	Erra	Neon	Sumerian	Produced/Mixed/Mastered
2018	Flares	Traces of You	Silent Static Records	Produced
2018	The HAARP Machine	"The Nadir"	Independent	Mixed
2019	Within Temptation	Resist	Vertigo Records	Mixed
2019	Awaken I Am	The Beauty in Tragedy (EP)	Victory	Engineered/Mixed/Mastered
2019	Famous Last Words	Arizona (EP)	SBG Records	
2019	Japam	Sickboy (EP)	Independent	Mixed/Mastered
2019	The Panic Division	Touch	Diggers Factory, Independent	Mixed/Mastered
2019	Wolves at the Gate	Eclipse	Solid State Records	Mixed/Mastered
2019	Veil of Maya	"Members Only"	Sumerian	Produced/Writer
2019	Today's Last Tragedy	Extinction (EP)	Self-released	Mastered
2019	Secrets	"My Mind, Myself & I"	Independent	
2020	Neverkept	"Complicated"	Epitaph Records	
2020	Neverkept	"Reunion Tower"	Epitaph	Produced/Mastered
2020	RedHook	"Dead Walk"	Self-released	Mixed/Mastered
2020	Secrets	"Comedown"	Independent	
2020	Nik Mystery	"The Internet"	Self-released	Produced/Mastered
2020	Zealand the North	Brightness of an Endless Light	Self-released	Mastered
2020	Vespera	A Fragile Seed (EP)	Independent	Engineered/Mixed/Mastered
2020	Rich People	Harmony	Here Goes Nothing Records	Produced/Mixed/Mastered
2020	Neverkept	"Sundown Somehow"	Epitaph	Produced
2020	Secrets	"Iron Hearted"	Independent	
2020	Conditions	Fluorescent Youth	Good Fight Music	Mixed (track 13, 10th anniversary edition)
2020	King Mothership	The Ritual	Century Media Records, 3DOT Recordings	Mastered
2020	Avoid	The Burner (EP)	Revival	Mixed/Mastered
2020	Secrets	"Hold On"	Independent	
2021	Holding Absence	The Greatest Mistake of My Life	SharpTone Records	Mixed/Mastered
2021	Vespera	Fading Light (EP)	Independent	Mixed
2021	Earthists	"Home"	Digitalcult Records	Mixed/Mastered
2021	Foxera	"Picture Perfect"	Self-released	Produced
2021	Foxera	"Away From Me" (feat. Kellin Quinn)	Self-released	Produced
2021	Foxera	"Way Out"	Self-released	Produced
2021	Renesans	I Hope the Cold Remembers Us (EP)	Self-released	Produced/Mixed/Mastered/Writer/Lyrics
2022	Wolves at the Gate	Eulogies	Solid State	Engineered/Mixed/Mastered
2022	Renesans	"Dead On"	Self-released	Produced/Mixed/Mastered
2022	Jason Richardson	II	Self-released	Engineered/Mixed/Mastered
2022	Holding Absence & Alpha Wolf	The Lost & the Longing (EP)	SharpTone	Mixed/Mastered (tracks 1 & 2)
2022	Smash Into Pieces	Disconnect	Self-released	Mixed/Mastered (track 7)
2022	All Good Things	Hold On (EP)	Better Noise Music	Engineer (track 2)
2023	As Everything Unfolds	Ultraviolet	Long Branch, SPV	Mixed/Mastered
2024	Cause for Conflict	"Guilt"	Self-released	Produced/Mixed/Mastered
2024	Tenside	Come Alive Dying	Ivorytower Records	Mixed/Mastered (track 11)
2024	Darkest Hour	Perpetual I Terminal	MNRK Heavy	Mixed
2024	SeeYouSpaceCowboy	Coup de Grâce	Pure Noise Records	Mixed
2024	Periphery	2 Song Acoustic Single (EP)	3DOT Recordings	Mastered
2024	The New Violence	"Head Underwater"	Self-released	Mixed/Mastered
2024	Secrets	"Despair"	Velocity Records	Produced
2026	As Everything Unfolds	Did You Ask to Be Set Free?	Century Media	Mixed/Mastered
