= A Pale White Dot =

Studio album by Periphery
- Released: May 15, 2026
- Genre: Djent
- Length: 47:38
- Label: 3DOT Recordings
- Producer: Periphery

Periphery chronology
Periphery V: Djent Is Not a Genre (2023)	A Pale White Dot (2026)

Singles from A Pale White Dot
- 1. "Mr. God" Released: April 2, 2026; 2. "Everyone Dies Alone" Released: April 23, 2026; 3. "Heaven on High" Released: May 15, 2026

A Pale White Dot is the eighth studio album by American progressive metal band Periphery. It was released on May 15, 2026, through Periphery's own label 3DOT Recordings. A Pale White Dot marks the first departure from their usual self-titled album names since Juggernaut: Alpha and Juggernaut: Omega in 2015, and their first to not feature their three dot logo.

== Background and promotion ==
On March 27, 2026, Periphery posted a new photograph of the five touring members, captioned "Periphery 2026. We're gonna be busy. #APWD" on their social media pages. This photograph includes vocalist Spencer Sotelo wearing a jacket with a white circle on the front of it, an early indication for the title. On March 30, 2026, the band announced the album, along with the title of its lead single and the release dates for both, May 15, 2026 and April 2, 2026 respectively. The album marks the first time the band has recorded with 6-string 30" baritone guitars, which were tuned to F standard a major seventh below standard guitar tuning with the lowest string dropped to Bb0 (BbBbEbAbCF).

Periphery have a European tour (featuring some major festivals such as Download Festival) scheduled for June 2026, shortly after the release of the album.

== Track listing ==
All tracks are written by Periphery, with additional co-writers where noted.

A Pale White Dot track listing
No.	Title	Writer(s)	Length
1.	"Obsession"		3:17
2.	"Talk"		5:18
3.	"Mr. God"		2:59
4.	"Heaven on High"		4:20
5.	"Unlocking"		4:28
6.	"Subhuman" (featuring Will Ramos)		2:52
7.	"Blackwall"		4:07
8.	"Malevolent"		4:01
9.	"Carry On"		3:30
10.	"Neon Valley"		5:01
11.	"Everyone Dies Alone"	Caleb Shomo	4:36
12.	"A Pale White Dot" (instrumental)		3:09
Total length:			47:38

== Personnel ==
Credits adapted from the album's liner notes.

Periphery

- Spencer Sotelo – lead vocals, production, mixing
- Misha Mansoor – guitar, synthesizers, programming, production, mixing
- Jake Bowen – guitar, synthesizers, programming, backing vocals, production
- Mark Holcomb – guitar, production
- Matt Halpern – drums, percussion, production
- Adam "Nolly" Getgood – bass, production, mixing, engineering, drum technician

Additional personnel

- Will Ramos – guest vocals (track 6)
- Matt Redenbo – engineering, drum technician
- Mike Kalajian – mastering
- Sebastian Sendon – drum technician
- Piper Ferrari – art design

== Charts ==
Chart performance for A Pale White Dot
Chart (2026)	Peak position
Japanese Download Albums (Billboard Japan)	48
UK Album Downloads (Official Charts)	13
UK Independent Albums (Official Charts)	43
UK Rock & Metal Albums (Official Charts)	23
