= Periphery V: Djent Is Not a Genre =

Studio album by Periphery
- Released: March 10, 2023
- Genres: Progressive metal; djent
- Length: 70:05
- Labels: 3DOT Recordings; Century Media; eOne
- Producer: Periphery

Periphery chronology
Periphery IV: Hail Stan (2019)	Periphery V: Djent Is Not a Genre (2023)	A Pale White Dot (2026)

Singles from Periphery V: Djent Is Not a Genre
- 1. "Wildfire" Released: January 12, 2023; 2. "Zagreus" Released: January 12, 2023; 3. "Atropos" Released: February 16, 2023

Periphery V: Djent Is Not a Genre is the seventh studio album by American progressive metal band Periphery. It was released on March 10, 2023, through the band's own label, 3DOT Recordings. The album was self-produced by the band.

== Background and promotion ==
On March 11, 2021, various members of Periphery posted an in-studio photo of the band onto social media, announcing the first writing session for their seventh studio album. On October 12, 2022, Jake Bowen announced that the new album was completed and ready for mastering. On January 9, 2023, after several days of teaser videos, the band announced the album itself and release date. In addition, they also revealed the album cover and released the first two singles, "Wildfire" and "Zagreus", on January 12.

Both singles include references to material from previous albums Juggernaut: Alpha and Juggernaut: Omega with the chorus of "Wildfire" reinterpreting the central motif of "The Event", and "Zagreus" featuring a primary riff from "Four Lights", among others. Mansoor also confirmed "Zagreus" was inspired by the award-winning indie video game Hades, as the song is named after the game's protagonist from Greek mythology and features a reference to the game's death leitmotif. On February 16, one month before the album release, the band unveiled the third single "Atropos" and its corresponding music video.

== Critical reception ==
Professional ratings
Review scores
Source	Rating
AllMusic	4/5 stars
Blabbermouth.net	9/10
Distorted Sound	10/10
Kerrang!	4/5 stars
Louder Sound	4/5 stars
Metal Injection	8/10
Metal Storm	7.6/10
MetalSucks	5/5 stars
Riff	9/10
Wall of Sound	9/10

The album received critical acclaim from critics. AllMusic gave the album a positive review saying, "The follow-up to 2019's acclaimed Periphery IV: Hail Stan, the wryly titled Periphery V: Djent Is Not a Genre delivers a masterclass in the progressive metal subgenre." Dom Lawson from Blabbermouth.net gave the album 9 out of 10 and said: "Active since the mid noughties, Periphery have made several genuinely great records along the way, but never one as adventurous or as complete as this. And again, while we expect them to be pretty heavy, Periphery V: Djent Is Not a Genre ups that particular ante all over again. Being pummelled by the future has never felt so good." Distorted Sound scored the album 10 out of 10 and said: "Periphery have prided themselves on forging a career packed full of innovation and experimentation, but as you digest the instalments of Periphery V it feels like you are listening to a once in a lifetime combination of musicians who are continuing to evolve into an untouchable force. Their output may be more of a 'passion project' as their focus has shifted to more viable methods of financial stability but this has by no means affected their hunger or enthusiasm to show that they are, without doubt, pioneers of their craft." Kerrang! gave the album 4 out of 5 and stated: "Ultimately, there is plenty of down-tuned, palm-muted, polyrhythmic madness here for those looking. But Periphery V feels like definitive proof that they're so much more than that."

Louder Sound gave the album a positive review and stated: "It's a historical certainty that whatever flavour-of-the-month tag emerges, there will always be bands who transcend it and create their own legacy. Periphery have consistently proved themselves a cut above the rest since their twin Juggernaut albums, and therefore have every right to be categorised however they seem fit." Metal Injection rated the album 8 out of 10 and stated, "I don't need to tell you about the immense talents held by every member of the band. Periphery came out of the gate in 2010 with incredible skill and precision, and none of that has changed here. It's a good Periphery album, though still not my favorite. But make no mistake: 'Wax Wings', 'Everything Is Fine!' and 'Zagreus' are going on the playlist." MetalSucks rated the album 5 out of 5 and said: "Djent might not be a genre, but this record is wholly representative of the colloquial subcategory, punching you in the face with low-tuned guitars and odd time signatures, while mixing in countless surprises along the way. Djent Is Not a Genre is a phenomenal representation of what Periphery can do, offering fun and undeniable heaviness throughout." Riff praised the album saying, "So even if djent is not a genre, it's at least a sonic signature for Periphery, which continues to play it to its impressive standards." Wall of Sound gave the album a positive review saying: "Djent is Not a Genre is another killer release in this band's esteemed career."

== Track listing ==
Periphery V: Djent Is Not a Genre track listing
No.	Title	Length
1.	"Wildfire"	7:05
2.	"Atropos"	8:23
3.	"Wax Wings"	7:26
4.	"Everything Is Fine!"	5:07
5.	"Silhouette"	4:51
6.	"Dying Star"	5:17
7.	"Zagreus"	8:19
8.	"Dracul Gras"	12:21
9.	"Thanks Nobuo"	11:16
Total length:		70:05

== Personnel ==
Periphery

- Spencer Sotelo – lead vocals
- Misha "Bulb" Mansoor – guitar, synthesizers, programming, orchestration
- Jake Bowen – guitar, synthesizers, programming, backing vocals
- Mark Holcomb – guitar
- Adam "Nolly" Getgood – bass, mixing, drum production
- Matt Halpern – drums

Additional musicians

- Jørgen Munkeby – saxophone on "Wildfire"
- Raoul Ahmad, Alec Eitrem, Tai Wright, Mikey Tucker, Liam Schmucker, Bryan Caudill – additional choir vocals

Additional personnel

- Sebastian Sendon – mixing assistant, drum and bass editing
- Mike Kalajian – mastering
- Travis Smith – album art, layout
- Brad Smalling – immersive mixing, immersive mastering

== Charts ==
Chart performance for Periphery V: Djent Is Not a Genre
Chart (2023)	Peak position
German Albums (Offizielle Top 100)	38
Japanese Digital Albums (Oricon)	48
Scottish Albums (Official Charts)	22
UK Album Downloads (Official Charts)	8
UK Independent Albums (Official Charts)	8
UK Rock & Metal Albums (Official Charts)	2
US Billboard 200	198
