= List of Slipknot tribute albums =

This is a guide to music made in tribute of American heavy metal band Slipknot. The first tribute album produced for the band was released on November 16, 2004. Currently the tribute discography for Slipknot consists of four tribute albums and two tribute songs, by Bring Me the Horizon and Periphery.

== Albums ==
=== A Tribute to Slipknot ===
A Tribute to Slipknot

Compilation album by Various artists
- Released: November 16, 2004
- Genre: Alternative metal, groove metal, nu metal
- Length: 43:58
- Label: Big Eye, Redline, Tributized

A Tribute To Slipknot is a tribute album by various artists and includes covers of tracks from Slipknot's first three studio albums. It was released on November 16, 2004 by Big Eye Records, and was re-released by Redline Records on June 11, 2007. On August 1, 2008, the album was re-released through Tributized Records with a bonus track, which was a cover of "Psychosocial" from Slipknot's fourth album All Hope Is Gone.

Track listing

1. "Wait and Bleed" — Rotting Saints — 2:30
2. "Liberate" — Cyphilis — 3:09
3. "Duality" — 666 Outlaws — 4:21
4. "People=Shit" — Disasterpiece — 3:34
5. "Wait and Bleed" (instrumental) — Rotting Saints — 2:30
6. "The Heretic Anthem" — Divination — 3:50
7. "Before I Forget" — Mourge of Intent — 4:26
8. "Surfacing" — I Want To Kill You — 3:45
9. "(sic)" — Destruction 412 — 3:24
10. "Before I Forget" (instrumental) — Mourge Of Intent — 4:24
11. "Wait and Bleed" — Disasterpiece — 2:28
12. "Vermilion" — Pig Beast — 5:37
13. "Psychosocial" — Dirge — 4:16 (2008 re-release bonus track)

=== Metal Guitar Tribute to Slipknot ===
Metal Guitar Tribute to Slipknot

Compilation album by Various artists
- Released: May 9, 2005
- Length: 42:33
- Label: Cherry Red

Metal Guitar Tribute to Slipknot is a tribute album by various artists and includes covers of tracks from Slipknot's first three studio albums. It was released on May 9, 2005 by Cherry Red Records.

Track listing

1. "Pulse of the Maggots" — 4:13
2. "Surfacing" — 3:39
3. "People=Shit" — 3:37
4. "Duality" — 4:14
5. "Spit It Out" — 2:42
6. "Left Behind" — 3:54
7. "The Blister Exists" — 5:20
8. "(sic)" — 3:24
9. "My Plague" — 3:42
10. "Wait and Bleed" — 2:28

=== The Scorched Earth Orchestra Performs Slipknot ===
The Scorched Earth Orchestra Performs Slipknot

Studio album by The Scorched Earth Orchestra
- Released: August 12, 2008
- Genre: String quartet
- Length: 41:23
- Label: Vitamin
- Producer: Noah Agruss

The Scorched Earth Orchestra Performs Slipknot is an orchestral tribute album by The Scorched Earth Orchestra and includes covers of tracks from Slipknot's first three studio albums. It was released on August 12, 2008 by Vitamin Records. The label's website enthuses that the Scorched Earth Orchestra "expand on Slipknot's marching-band-from-hell framework" with "booming percussion, in-your-face horns [and] string sections that rip at your flesh".

Track listing

1. "Left Behind" — 3:36
2. "Surfacing" — 3:47
3. "My Plague" — 3:10
4. "Vermilion" — 5:32
5. "The Shape" — 3:49
6. "The Nameless" — 4:24
7. "Danger, Keep Away" — 3:44
8. "Wait and Bleed" — 4:05
9. "Killers Are Quiet" — 4:47
10. "Duality" — 4:29

Personnel

- Noah Agruss – producer, orchestration
- Marcelo Blanco – design, layout design
- Paul DuGre – mastering
- Greg Sanford – project coordinator

=== Slipknot Heavy String Tribute ===
Slipknot Heavy String Tribute

Studio album by String Tribute Players
- Released: August 19, 2008
- Genre: String quartet
- Length: 36:18
- Label: Copycats

Slipknot Heavy String Tribute is an orchestral tribute album by String Tribute Players and includes covers of tracks from Slipknot's first three studio albums. It was released on August 19, 2008 by Copycats Records. The album is available exclusively as an MP3 download.

Track listing

1. "Before I Forget" — 4:23
2. "Duality" — 3:44
3. "Wait and Bleed" — 2:40
4. "Pulse of the Maggots" — 3:39
5. "Spit It Out" — 3:56
6. "Left Behind" — 3:38
7. "Vermilion" — 3:52
8. "Vermilion, Pt. 2" — 3:52
9. "The Heretic Anthem" — 4:19
10. "(sic)" — 2:15

=== Wait and Bleed: The Slipknot Sessions ===
Wait and Bleed: The Slipknot Sessions

Studio album by The Guitar All-Stars
- Released: May 01, 2008
- Genre: Heavy metal, nu metal
- Length: 35:13

Wait and Bleed: The Slipknot Sessions is a tribute album by the band The Guitar All-Stars. The album features songs from Slipknot's first three studio albums.

Consumers generally did not give high ratings for the album. Many customers referred to it as "terrible", among other negative comments. The overall iTunes customer rating was 1.5 out of 5 stars.

Track listing

All songs performed by The Guitar All-Stars.

1. Pulse of the Maggots — 4:13
2. Surfacing — 3:39
3. People=Shit — 3:37
4. Duality — 4:14
5. Spit It Out — 2:42
6. Left Behind — 3:54
7. The Blister Exists — 5:20
8. (Sic) — 3:24
9. My Plague — 3:42
10. Wait and Bleed — 2:28

== Songs ==
=== "Eyeless" cover ===
"Eyeless (Slipknot Cover)"

Song by Bring Me the Horizon

from the album Higher Voltage!: Another Brief History of Rock and Count Your Blessings
- Written: Original lyrics: Slipknot; Covered lyrics: Bring Me the Horizon
- Released: June 20, 2007
- Genre: Deathcore
- Length: 4:04
- Label: Kerrang!

In 2007 British metalcore band Bring Me the Horizon contributed a cover of the track "Eyeless" to Kerrang!'s compilation Higher Voltage!: Another Brief History of Rock. When questioned why they chose to cover the track vocalist Oli Sykes enthused, "because it's as heavy as hell", while expressing how much he liked Slipknot. He also explained, "they've got some blistering breakdowns" and that they wanted to make a cover version which was heavier than the original.

Track listing

(For entire track listing see Higher Voltage!: Another Brief History of Rock)

15. "Eyeless" — 4:04

=== "The Heretic Anthem" cover ===
"The Heretic Anthem (Slipknot Cover)"

Song by Periphery

from the album Periphery II: This Time It's Personal
- Written: Original lyrics: Slipknot; Covered lyrics: Periphery
- Released: July 3, 2012
- Genre: Progressive metal, djent
- Length: 3:49
- Label: Sumerian, Distort, Roadrunner

American djent progressive metal band Periphery covered the song as a bonus track on their second album Periphery II: This Time It's Personal.

=== "Only One" cover ===
"Only One (Slipknot cover)"

Song by Griderton

from the album Only One of Us Walks Away
- Written: Original lyrics: Slipknot; Covered lyrics: Griderton
- Genre: Nu metal
- Length: 2:55
- Label: Sharp, Denyial

In 2023, American musician Griderton released a cover Slipknot's "Only One" along with their EP Only One of Us Walks Away, including a radio edit and clean version.

==== Track listing ====
1. "Only One" — 2:55
