= Showing Teeth =

- Born: Kentucky
- Origin: Nashville, Tennessee
- Genres: Metalcore; deathcore; progressive metalcore; grindcore
- Occupations: Vocalist; songwriter
- Years active: 2024–present
- Labels: Republic; Spinefarm
- Website: showingteeth.com

Addison, known professionally as Showing Teeth, is an American vocalist, songwriter, and heavy metal musician, from Nashville, Tennessee. Her debut extended play, A Fate Worse Than Loneliness, released in September 2026.

== Early life ==
Born in Kentucky, Addison started as a bass player for a number of bands since she was in middle school. She was raised in Louisville, Kentucky and has cited her disdain for her conservative Christian upbringing as an influence for her songwriting, using her previously repressed mental health problems as lyrical influences. She initially got into heavy metal music after having been "subjected" to Christian music during her childhood, and meeting a friend at a Christian summer camp who introduced her to the genre. She subsequently became a fan of bands such as Veil of Maya, Animals as Leaders, and Periphery, the latter of which's drummer would eventually collaborate with her during the start of her music career.

Addison has been to college and has a degree in healthcare.

== Career ==
In 2024, now based in Nashville, Tennessee, she adopted the stage name Showing Teeth, and quickly became well-known from her social media presence, originally known for posting covers from bands such as Underoath and Whitechapel, recorded inside her Honda Accord. Her debut single, "Labyrinth", was released November 14, 2025, with collaborations from drummer Matt Halpern of Periphery and mixer Zakk Cervini. Her first live performance under the Showing Teeth name took place in Nashville in November 2025. The following month, on December 5, she released a music video for the single.

Following teasers released via social media, her second single, "Rip", was released February 13, 2026. In February and March 2026, she performed as a supporting act for two shows for Beartooth, in Indianapolis and Milwaukee. In April 2026, she was featured on the remixed single "Knot" by Shyeye. She performed at Sick New World festival 2026 in Las Vegas. In June 2026, she announced her first headline show in London, to be performed on July 14 in Camden Town, and was also announced to be performing at Bring Me the Horizon's live shows in Manchester following the release of their re-recorded album, Count Your Blessings: Repented, also in July.

On July 24, 2026, Showing Teeth announced she had signed to Republic Records and Spinefarm Records, and revealed her debut 7-track EP, A Fate Worse Than Loneliness, would release September 4, 2026. Alongside the announcement, she also released the single "Bad Exchanges". She is also set to perform at Louder Than Life and Shaky Knees festivals, and support President's North American tour in September and October 2026. On November 6, she released the single "Hellraiser", alongside its music video.

== Artistry ==
Showing Teeth's work has been described as metalcore, deathcore, progressive metalcore, and grindcore. Addison has cited Periphery, Veil of Maya, Born of Osiris, Corelia, Animals as Leaders, Knocked Loose, Bring Me the Horizon, and Whitechapel as influences.

== Personal life ==
Addison has two pet cats, named Stanley and Michael; the latter features as the cover art for her debut EP, A Fate Worse Than Loneliness.

Addison is dating George Holding, the bassist for Static Dress.

== Discography ==
=== Extended plays ===
List of extended plays
Title	EP details
A Fate Worse Than Loneliness	Released: September 4, 2026; Label: Republic, Spinefarm; Format: CD, DL

=== Singles ===
List of singles
Title	Year	Album
"Labyrinth"	2025	A Fate Worse; Than Loneliness EP
"Rip"	2026	A Fate Worse; Than Loneliness EP
"Knot" (Remix) (Shyeye featuring Showing Teeth)	2026	Non-album single
"Bad Exchanges"	2026	A Fate Worse; Than Loneliness EP
"Make It Out"	2026	A Fate Worse; Than Loneliness EP
"Hellraiser"	2026	TBA

=== Music videos ===
List of music videos, showing year released, album and director(s)
Title	Year	Album	Director(s)	Link
"Bad Exchanges"	2026	A Fate Worse; Than Loneliness EP	Rogue Bonaventura	
"Make It Out"	2026	A Fate Worse; Than Loneliness EP	Unknown	
"Hellraiser"	2026	TBA	Unknown	

== Awards and nominations ==
Year	Organization	Award	Nominatee/Work	Result	Ref.
2026	Morecore Music Awards	Song of the Year	"Labyrinth"	Nominated	
2026	Morecore Music Awards	Best Before the Hype Artist	Showing Teeth	Nominated	
