= I Am (Toothgrinder album) =

Studio album by Toothgrinder
- Released: October 11, 2019
- Genre: Nu metalcore; progressive metal; groove metal
- Length: 39:51
- Label: Spinefarm
- Producer: Matt Squire

Toothgrinder chronology
Phantom Amour (2017)	I Am (2019)

Singles from I Am
- 1. "I Am" Released: August 23, 2019; 2. "My Favorite Hurt" Released: September 24, 2019; 3. "The Silence of a Sleeping WASP" Released: October 5, 2019

Professional ratings
Review scores
Source	Rating
Cryptic Rock	5/5 stars
Dead Press!	2/10 stars
Distorted Sound	8/10
Exclaim!	3/10
Metal Temple	8/10 stars

I Am is the third studio album by American metalcore band Toothgrinder. The album was released on October 11, 2019 through Spinefarm Records.

== Lyrical themes ==
Opening track "The Silence of a Sleeping WASP" is a sequel to "The Shadow" from the band's previous album Phantom Amour. Lyrically, the songs deal with Carl Jung's concept of the shadow and how it deals with addiction and alcoholism. The album's title track also deals with themes of addiction, along with depression, anxiety, and co-dependency, among others.

== Reception ==
I Am polarized critics upon its release.

Cryptic Rock gave the album a perfect score of 5/5, calling I Am the band's most complete work to date. Distorted Sound gave the album a highly positive review, praising the album's experimental but accessible sound along with Matthews's emotional lyrics.

Zach Buggy of Dead Press! gave the album an overwhelmingly negative review, saying the aggressiveness of Nocturnal Masquerade and the progressiveness of Phantom Amour have been diluted and "boiled down into a melting pot of half-baked ideas" that results in "a bland, accessible mess." Buggy said the band comes off as "a less obnoxious Five Finger Death Punch, or as metal’s answer to Imagine Dragons." Exclaim!'s Max Morin also gave an overwhelmingly negative review, saying the album sounds like every metal song on SiriusXM meshed together, resulting in a sound similar to Shinedown and Bring Me the Horizon. Morin claimed the record was Toothgrinder selling out, getting rid of many of its heavier and experimental elements for a "pop sheen" and "radio-friendly production." Morin did praise the title track for the confessional lyrics of Justin Matthews and for the djent style riff.

== Track listing ==
All lyrics are written by Justin Matthews; all music is composed by Toothgrinder.

No.	Title	Length
1.	"The Silence of a Sleeping WASP"	3:23
2.	"ohmymy"	3:20
3.	"My Favorite Hurt"	4:05
4.	"No Tribe"	4:46
5.	"no surrender in the House of Leaves"	3:50
6.	"shiVer"	2:53
7.	"The New Punk Rock"	2:53
8.	"too soft for the scene, TOO MEAN FOR THE GREEN"	3:29
9.	"Can Ü Live Today?"	3:03
10.	"The Fire of June"	4:46
11.	"I Am"	3:23

== Personnel ==
- Justin Matthews – lead vocals
- Johnuel Hasney – lead guitar, backing vocals
- Jason Goss – rhythm guitar
- Matt Arensdorf – bass, backing vocals
- Wills Weller – drums
