= Periphery (album) =

Studio album by Periphery
- Released: April 20, 2010
- Genres: Progressive metal; djent; progressive metalcore
- Length: 72:52
- Labels: Sumerian; Distort; Roadrunner
- Producers: Periphery; Matt Murphy

Periphery chronology
Periphery (2010)	Periphery II: This Time It's Personal (2012)

Periphery is the debut studio album by American progressive metal band Periphery. It was released on April 20, 2010, through Sumerian Records, and was produced by the band themselves and Matt Murphy. This is the only album to feature guitarist Alex Bois and bassist Tom Murphy.

== Recording ==
Many songs on the tracklist had been written long before the release date—with some written by former lead vocalists Casey Sabol & Chris Barretto—but due to membership changes, the album was postponed on several occasions. Former vocalist Chris Barretto had nearly finished recording the album before he and the band parted ways months before its release. Rather than release the songs with Barretto's vocals, the band decided to rerecord Barretto's songs with Spencer Sotelo; however, Sotelo only re-worked a few of the melodies when recording vocals, versus writing completely new lyrics. As a result, Sabol's and Barretto's lyrics and vocal melodies and harmonies are still featured on the record. The album was re-released on February 6, 2012, as a 'Special Edition' including instrumentals, along with a new song "Passenger", originally recorded by guitarist Mark Holcomb during his time in the band Haunted Shores.

== Critical reception ==
Professional ratings
Review scores
Source	Rating
AbsolutePunk	84%
AllMusic	4/5 stars
Rock Sound	7/10 stars

A writer for AbsolutePunk said that despite Sotelo's "frog-like" screams being weak throughout the track listing, the record contains solid lyricism and musicianship that add support to Sotelo's singing, concluding that "From beginning to end, Periphery's self titled debut is a wonder to behold, and in my mind, will inspire modern metal for the next decade, and with the sincerity, originality, and technical abilities of this band, that can only be a good thing." Gregory Heaney of AllMusic praised the band for constructing a mixture of "blistering fretwork, extreme tunings, and studio magic" that's reminiscent of Meshuggah and The Dillinger Escape Plan without sounding overproduced, concluding that "By pushing the production to such limits, the album manages to blast through the typical production clichés to create a sonic assault […] making Periphery an album that'll give lovers of prog metal something to sink their teeth into." Richard Cartey of Rock Sound admired the band's unique amalgam of "steady lyrical patterns" through a "polyrhythmic maze" to craft their own blueprint of progressive metal but pointed out their overreliance on mimicking fellow band Sikth to attain that creative spark, concluding with, "Though there are some remarkably beautiful sections, ultimately Periphery’s palette is limited and struggles to support itself for all 73 minutes. Still, a laudably bold statement."

== Track listing ==
All lyrics are written by Chris Barretto, except where noted; all music is composed by Periphery.

No.	Title	Lyrics	Length
1.	"Insomnia"	Casey Sabol, Chris Barretto	4:49
2.	"The Walk"	Tom Murphy, Chris Barretto	5:06
3.	"Letter Experiment"	Casey Sabol, Chris Barretto	6:51
4.	"Jetpacks Was Yes!"	Matt Murphy, Spencer Sotelo	3:57
5.	"Light"	Tom Murphy, Chris Barretto	5:50
6.	"All New Materials"		5:20
7.	"Buttersnips"		5:54
8.	"Icarus Lives!" (contains hidden track "Ragtime Dandies" starting at 3:10)	Casey Sabol	4:24
9.	"Totla Mad"	Tom Murphy, Chris Barretto	4:00
10.	"Ow My Feelings"		6:06
11.	"Zyglrox"		5:06
12.	"Racecar"	Chris Barretto	15:23
Total length:			72:52

UK Bonus Track
No.	Title	Lyrics	Length
13.	"Eureka!"	Tom Murphy	4:51

European Reissue Track
No.	Title	Lyrics	Length
14.	"Passenger"	Spencer Sotelo	3:35

iTunes Bonus Tracks
No.	Title	Length
13.	"Captain On"	3:13
14.	"Ragtime Dandies"	1:12

Notes

- An instrumental version was released through the iTunes Store.
- "Ragtime Dandies" also appears at the end of "Icarus Lives!" on the CD version.
- "Captain On" and "Eureka!" were included on the Icarus EP.
- "Passenger" was released on February 21, 2012, as a digital-single via iTunes.

== Outtakes ==
The following tracks were cut from the final album.

- Not Enough Mana
- Absolomb (later included on Periphery III)
- Far Out (later included on Periphery II as a bonus track)
- Project 15

== Personnel ==
- Spencer Sotelo – lead vocals
- Misha "Bulb" Mansoor – guitar, programming, producer
- Jake Bowen – guitar, programming
- Alex Bois – guitar, backing vocals
- Tom Murphy – bass, backing vocals
- Matt Halpern – drums, percussion

Guest appearances

- Adam 'Nolly' Getgood – guitar solo (on "Totla Mad")
- Jeff Loomis – guitar solo (on "Racecar")
- Elliot Coleman – vocals (on "Racecar")
- Casey Sabol – vocals (on "Racecar")

Production

- Misha Mansoor – producer, mixing, mastering
- Matt Murphy – vocal recording, producer
- Benjamin Guarino – album artwork, layout and design

== Charts ==
Chart performance for Periphery
Chart (2010)	Peak position
US Billboard 200	128
US Heatseekers Albums (Billboard)	2
US Independent Albums (Billboard)	18
US Top Hard Rock Albums (Billboard)	12
US Top Rock Albums (Billboard)	39
