= Toothgrinder =

American progressive metal band

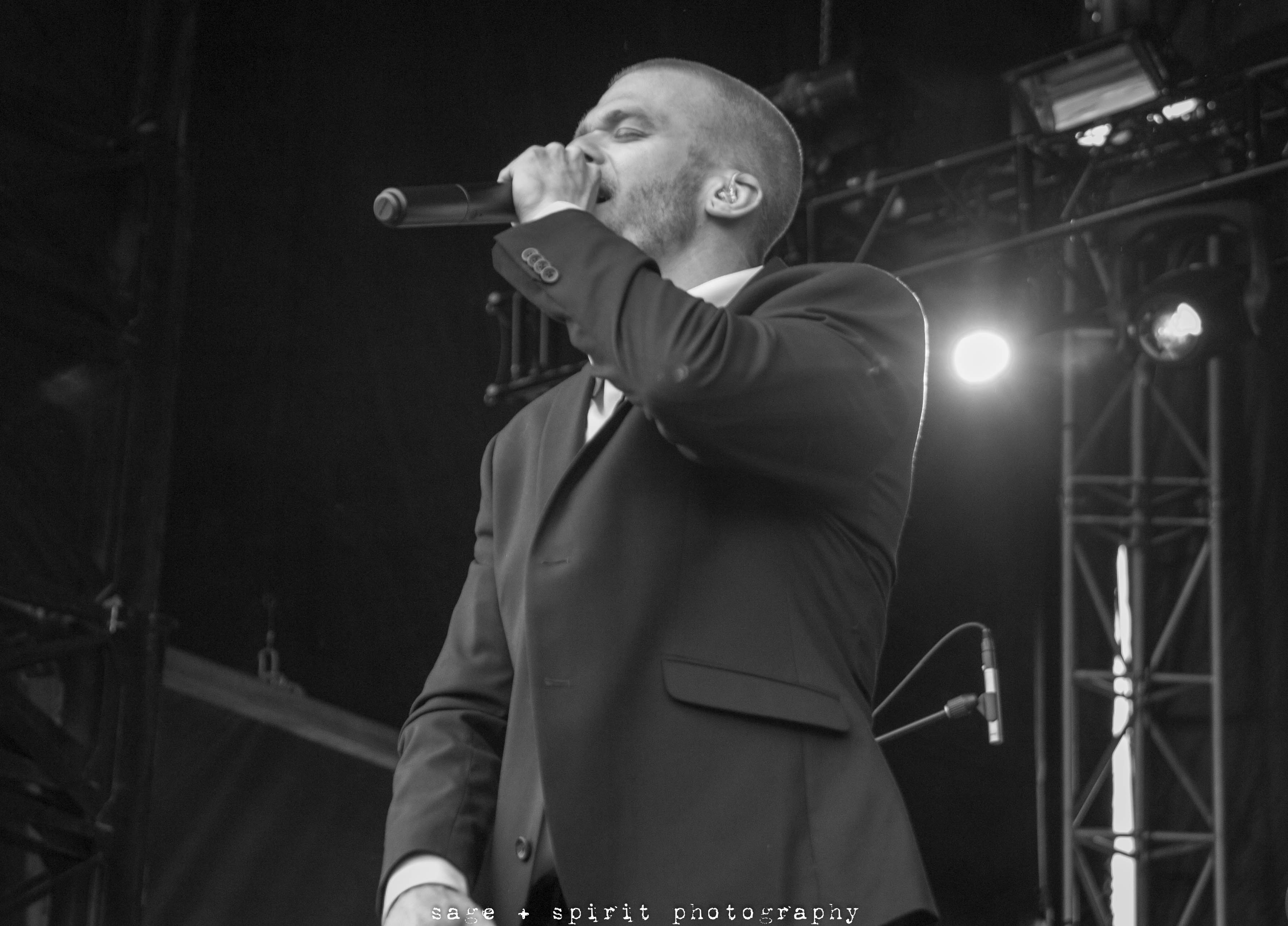
- The band's lead vocalist, Justin Matthews, at Fort Rock 2018.

Background information
- Origin: Asbury Park, New Jersey, U.S.
- Genres: Progressive metal; metalcore; post-hardcore
- Years active: 2010–present
- Labels: Spinefarm
- Members: Justin Matthews; Wills Weller; Jason Goss; Matt Arensdorf; Johnuel Hasney
- Past members: Matt Mielke

Toothgrinder is an American progressive metal band from Asbury Park, New Jersey.

== History ==
Original members Wills Weller, Justin Matthews, Matt Arensdorf, Jason Goss, and Matt Mielke met during high school and informally formed the band after their graduation. They kept the band together while attending 10 different colleges.

=== EPs ===
Toothgrinder has released three EPs - Turning of the Tides in 2011, Vibration/Colour/Frequency in 2012, and Schizophrenic Jubilee in 2014.

=== Nocturnal Masquerade ===
On January 29, 2016, Toothgrinder released their first full-length album, Nocturnal Masquerade. The album has been met with widespread critical acclaim. Spencer Sotelo of Periphery provided guest vocals on the album's eighth track, "Diamonds for Gold".

=== Phantom Amour ===
On November 10, 2017, the group released their second studio album, Phantom Amour, which was subsequently met with largely positive reviews. On September 21, 2018, the band released a cover of the Fleetwood Mac song "The Chain".

=== I Am ===
On August 23, 2019, Toothgrinder released a new song, "I AM", and announced that a new album, I Am, would be released later that year on October 11. The album's second single, "My Favorite Hurt", was released on September 24 and the third single, "The Silence of a Sleeping WASP", was released on October 5. I AM, the band's third studio album, was released on October 11, 2019. The album features a stylistic shift for the band, with Max Morin of Exclaim! describing the album's sound as nu metalcore. I Am was produced by Matt Squire, who has worked with bands such as All Time Low, Panic! At the Disco, and Underoath.

To support the album, Toothgrinder was an opening act on select dates of Lacuna Coil's fall 2019 North American tour with All That Remains. The album's title track was included on Loudwire's list of "The 66 Best Metal Songs of 2019".

== Members ==
=== Current ===
- Justin Matthews – lead vocals (2010–present)
- Jason Goss – rhythm guitar (2010–present)
- Matt Arensdorf – bass, backing vocals (2010–present)
- Wills Weller – drums (2010–present)
- Johnuel Hasney – lead guitar, backing vocals (2016–present)

=== Former ===
- Matt Mielke – lead guitar (2010–2016)

== Discography ==
Toothgrinder discography
- Studio albums: 3
- EPs: 3
- Music videos: 10

=== Studio albums ===
Year	Album	Label
2016	Nocturnal Masquerade	Spinefarm Records
2017	Phantom Amour	Spinefarm Records
2019	I Am	Spinefarm Records

=== Extended plays ===
Year	Album	Label
2011	Turning of the Tides	Self–released
2012	Vibration/Colour/Frequency	Self–released
2014	Schizophrenic Jubilee	Spinefarm Records

=== Music videos ===
Year	Song	Album
2014	"The Hour Angle"	Schizophrenic Jubilee
2015	"The House (That Fear Built)"	Nocturnal Masquerade
2015	"Lace & Anchor"	Nocturnal Masquerade
2016	"Diamonds for Gold"	Nocturnal Masquerade
2016	"Blue"	Nocturnal Masquerade
2016	"Coeur D'Alene"	Nocturnal Masquerade
2017	"The Shadow"	Phantom Amour
2018	"Vagabond"	Phantom Amour
2019	"My Favorite Hurt"	I Am
2019	"The Silence of a Sleeping WASP"	I Am
