= Periphery IV: Hail Stan =

Studio album by Periphery
- Released: April 5, 2019
- Recorded: October 2018
- Genres: Progressive metal; djent; progressive metalcore
- Length: 63:59
- Labels: 3DOT Recordings; Century Media; eOne
- Producers: Misha Mansoor; Adam Getgood

Periphery chronology
Periphery III: Select Difficulty (2016)	Periphery IV: Hail Stan (2019)	Periphery V: Djent Is Not a Genre (2023)

Singles from Periphery IV: Hail Stan
- 1. "Blood Eagle" Released: February 6, 2019; 2. "Garden in the Bones" Released: March 1, 2019

Periphery IV: Hail Stan is the sixth studio album by American progressive metal band Periphery. The album was released on April 5, 2019. It is their first album not to be released on Sumerian Records, as the band parted ways with the label in 2018. The album was independently released on the band's own label, 3DOT Recordings. It is also Periphery's first album since the departure of bassist Adam "Nolly" Getgood in 2017, though he still served as producer and performed mixing duties for the album, in addition to performing the final bass parts written by guitarist Misha Mansoor. The album also features live orchestrations and choir from the band's longtime collaborator and arranger Randy Slaugh.

== Release and promotion ==
Periphery IV: Hail Stan was officially announced on February 6, 2019. The album's first single, "Blood Eagle" was released alongside the announcement, with an accompanying music video. A second single, "Garden in the Bones", was released on March 1, 2019. On April 1, 2019, the album became available for streaming on Periphery's YouTube channel, four days before its scheduled release. The album features the band's longest song to date, "Reptile", at 16 minutes and 44 seconds, as well as "Sentient Glow", a reworking of the song of the same name by Haunted Shores, a studio project featuring Periphery guitarists Misha Mansoor and Mark Holcomb.

== Critical reception ==
Professional ratings
Review scores
Source	Rating
AllMusic	4/5 stars
Dead Press!	10/10
Distorted Sound	10/10
Exclaim!	8/10
Metal Injection	10/10
New Noise	5/5 stars
PopMatters	8/10 stars

The album received critical acclaim from critics. Damon Taylor from Dead Press! rated the album positively, saying: "Hail Stan is Periphery on their own terms. Self-assured, textured, and a behemoth of a record, it's a release that demands repeat listens."

Distorted Sound scored the album 10 out of 10 and said: "If you glanced at Periphery IV's track-list with no prior knowledge of the band, you'd immediately acknowledge the 17-minute opener and 10-minute closer and likely place them as a newcomer with something to prove. A band of this status can always play it safe, but no such thing exists for PERIPHERY. Once again they have approached their next chapter with ambition and audacity, and executed it in blindingly successful fashion. In simpler terms, Periphery IV: Hail Stan is virtually flawless. It seamlessly encompasses every beloved aspect of the band's arsenal without even vaguely shying away from creativity and innovation, resulting in some of the finest material progressive metal has ever seen. And on an even more profound level, it once again highlights their ability to appease music fans of all persuasions whilst also exhibiting masterful, magical musicianship."

Lukas Wojcicki of Exclaim! gave it 8 out of 10 and said: "Despite the extra time dedicated to the album's composition, at its core, it is still very much a Periphery album. Aside from the obvious example, "Crush" — a full-blown Combichrist-like industrial track — Periphery don't pull many surprises on Periphery IV, but that's not to say they didn't make good use of their freedom. Periphery IV is masterfully executed, well thought-out, extremely well-produced, and offers up nine more great Periphery tracks that we can all enjoy." Metal Injection gave the album a perfect score 10/10 and jokingly saying: "The only possible issue with Periphery IV: HAIL STAN is that subtitle. If it's just a joke, that's cool—but it could’ve been better, especially after the hilarity that ensued as fans debated such potential candidates as Shrek 3, A New Hope, Die Hard 7, and Age of Ultron. Still, there's always next time. Leave your own suggestions in the comments, and make sure that Periphery V gets the subtitle it deserves."

New Noise gave the album 5 out of 5 and stated: "After months of teasing and build-up, what's most immediately noticeable about IV: Hail Stan (hereafter P4) is how very much Periphery are clearly toying with their established sound. To boot – some songs here are unrecognizable for those who have kept track of the DC band, while others find the group spreading their wings in bold and fascinating new directions. [...] Periphery are clearly interested in making music entertaining and fun over worrying about how heavy or complex a song is – and that spirit of merriment is at the heart of why this is the band's best record yet. [...] There are no weak spots on this impeccable record, but it's a testament to the band that their best album to date is their least 'Periphery' one yet. The band taking their time with P4 paid off wonderfully."

PopMatters praised the album but saying, "It doesn't quite reach the heights of its two immediate predecessors overall, but it upholds enough of what made them great to satisfy while also adding enough new characteristics to possess its own identity and merit by comparison. Thus, it's another outstanding and singular achievement for the quintet that will surely satisfy fans and rank highly during the requisite 'Best of 2019' year-end genre lists. After nearly 15 years on the scene, Periphery still reigns above most of their peers."

Loudwire named it one of the 50 best metal albums of 2019.

== Track listing ==
No.	Title	Length
1.	"Reptile"	16:44
2.	"Blood Eagle"	5:58
3.	"Chvrch Bvrner"	3:41
4.	"Garden in the Bones"	5:57
5.	"It's Only Smiles"	5:33
6.	"Follow Your Ghost"	5:24
7.	"Crush"	6:49
8.	"Sentient Glow"	4:28
9.	"Satellites"	9:25
Total length:		63:59

Notes

- "Chvrch Bvrner" is stylized in uppercase.

== Personnel ==
Periphery

- Spencer Sotelo – vocals, additional mixing and engineering
- Misha "Bulb" Mansoor – guitars, programming, orchestration, producing, additional mixing and engineering
- Jake Bowen – guitar, programming, cover art
- Mark Holcomb – guitar
- Adam "Nolly" Getgood – bass, guitar, engineering, producing, mixing
- Matt Halpern – drums

Additional personnel

- Ermin "Red Pill" Hamidovic – mastering
- Ernie Slenkovich – additional engineering
- Joe Hamilton (Prism Recordings) – additional editing
- Mikee Goodman – additional vocals on "Reptile"
- Randy Slaugh – live orchestrations, choir producing, arrangement and conducting
- Mitch Davis, Ken Amacher, Randy Slaugh, Austin Bentley – engineering and editing
- Enoch Campbell, Clayton Wieben, Diana Shull, Andres Cardenas, Jordan Jensen, Bryant Wilson, Connor Law, Rocky Schofield, Austin Bentley, Kemarie Whiting, Miriam Housley, Matt Jensen, Sebastien Ruesch, Sarah Farr, Ryan Whitehead, Joseph Facer, John Yelland, Wesley Monahan, Hailey Arnold, Alyssa Lemmon Chapman, Eric Slaugh, Mac Christensen, Samson Winzer, Chad Chen – choir
- Cymrie Van Drew – violin
- Emily Rust – violin
- Caryn Bradley – viola
- Chris Morgan – cello
- Steven Park – French horn
- Chris Kutsor – cover art, layout

== Charts ==
Chart (2019)	Peak position
Australian Albums (ARIA)	21
Austrian Albums (Ö3 Austria)	48
Belgian Albums (Ultratop Flanders)	169
Finnish Albums (Suomen virallinen lista)	39
French Albums (SNEP)	147
German Albums (Offizielle Top 100)	36
Scottish Albums (Official Charts)	22
Swiss Albums (Schweizer Hitparade)	66
UK Albums (Official Charts)	23
US Billboard 200	63
US Independent Albums (Billboard)	1
