= The War Within Us =

The War within Us

Studio album by Onward to Olympas
- Released: March 15, 2011
- Genres: Christian hardcore, Christian metal
- Length: 33:53
- Label: Facedown
- Producers: Jamie King, Onward to Olympas

Onward to Olympas chronology
| This World Is Not My Home (2010) | The War within Us (2011) | Indicator (2012) |

The War within Us is the second studio album from Onward to Olympas. Facedown Records released the album on March 15, 2011. Onward to Olympas worked with Jamie King, in the production of this album.

== Critical reception ==
Professional ratings
Review scores
| Source | Rating |
|---|---|
| Christ Core | 5/5 stars |
| Cross Rhythms | 8/10 squares |
| HM Magazine | 3/5 stars |
| Indie Vision Music | 4/5 stars |
| Jesus Freak Hideout | 4/5 stars |
| Mind Equals Blown | 4.5/10 |
| The New Review | 4.5/5 stars |

Rating the album an eight out of ten for Cross Rhythms, Peter John Willoughby writes, "It would be easy to define this simply as metalcore, but it also contains punishing double bass, balanced breakdowns, blast beats and heavy guitar grooves." Scott Fryberger, awarding the album four stars from Jesus Freak Hideout, states, "The War Within Us is certainly not a perfect album ... but Onward To Olympas has some more goodness on their hands. Metalheads will enjoy this, no doubt." Giving the album four stars at Indie Vision Music, Steve says, "This is an extremely solid album from an up and coming band." Jen Rochester, awarding the album four and a half stars by The New Review, describes, "While the album might not be perfect, I’m hard-pressed to come up with anything significant that I don’t like about it. Hopefully this album will help garner the attention these guys deserve." Brian Morrissette, giving the album five stars for Christ Core, says, "Excellent Spirit-filled metalcore containing powerful lyrics and all-around great music."

Signaling in a three star review from HM Magazine, Tim Harris describes, "Onward to Olympas are trying to find themselves ... The album walks a thin line from metalcore to oldschool hardcore, while mixing in some clean vocals and even a softer praise song." Sebastian Fonseca, specifying in a 4.5 out of ten review for Mind Equals Blown, writes, "Onward to Olympas is one of the latest of cases in the metalcore scene of bands that simply fall victim to the plague of misdirection. The War Within Us is an example of what happens when a band tries to do more than one thing at a time ... The War Within Us is an album you can spin a couple of times, if you’re a fan of the genre, but even then a couple of spins is probably the most you’ll get out of this record."

== Track listing ==
All tracks are written by Onward to Olympas

| No. | Title | Length |
|---|---|---|
| 1. | "The Continuance" | 0:47 |
| 2. | "The War within Us" | 4:05 |
| 3. | "Revealing" | 2:56 |
| 4. | "Hidden Eyes" | 3:08 |
| 5. | "Seeker" | 3:03 |
| 6. | "Structures" | 2:48 |
| 7. | "Unsuitable Patterns" | 4:09 |
| 8. | "The March" | 1:58 |
| 9. | "Accuser" | 3:44 |
| 10. | "From the Mouth" | 2:49 |
| 11. | "Rebuilt" | 4:26 |
| Total length: | | 33:53 |

== Credits ==
Onward To Olympas

- Justin Allman - Bass
- Kramer Lowe - Unclean Vocals
- Nick Helvey - Drums
- Andrew Higginbotham - Guitar
- Andy Simmons - Guitar, Clean Vocals

Additional Musicians

- Justin Gage - Vocals
- Ashleigh Higginbotham - Vocals

Production

- Burak 'Loomis The Turk' Erin - Management
- Josh Deaton - Photography
- Jamie King - Engineer, Mastering, Mixing, Producer
- David Morrison - Booking
- Ryan Nelson - Management
- Dave Quiggle - Artwork
