= Nocturnal Masquerade =

Studio album by Toothgrinder
- Released: January 29, 2016
- Recorded: Summer 2015
- Studio: Oceanic Recording, Bethesda, Maryland; Valencia Recording, Baltimore, Maryland
- Genre: Progressive metal; metalcore; post-hardcore
- Length: 42:00
- Label: Spinefarm
- Producer: Taylor Larson

Toothgrinder chronology
| Schizophrenic Jubilee (2014) | Nocturnal Masquerade (2016) | Phantom Amour (2017) |

Professional ratings
Review scores
| Source | Rating |
|---|---|
| Exclaim! | 7/10 |
| Metal Injection | 9.5/10 |
| Metal Hammer | 4/5 stars |
| MetalSucks | 4.5/5 stars |
| New Noise Magazine | 5/5 stars |

Nocturnal Masquerade is the debut studio album by American metalcore band Toothgrinder. The album was released on January 29, 2016, through Spinefarm Records. This is the last release to feature guitarist Matt Mielke.

== Overview ==
The album was produced by Taylor Larson (Darkest Hour, Veil of Maya). Spencer Sotelo of Periphery provides guest vocals on the song "Diamonds for Gold."

Five music videos were released from the album: "The House (That Fear Built)" on November 3, 2015; "Lace & Anchor" on November 25; "Diamonds for Gold" on January 18, 2016; "Blue" on April 20; and "Coeur D'Alene" on June 22.

The songs "The Hour Angle," "Dejection / Despondency," and "Schizophrenic Jubilee" were re-recorded from the EP Schizophrenic Jubilee.

== Track listing ==
All tracks are written by Toothgrinder.

| No. | Title | Length |
|---|---|---|
| 1. | "The House (That Fear Built)" | 3:52 |
| 2. | "Lace & Anchor" | 3:50 |
| 3. | "Coeur D'Alene" | 3:01 |
| 4. | "I Lie in Rain" | 3:00 |
| 5. | "Blue" | 4:30 |
| 6. | "The Hour Angle" | 3:36 |
| 7. | "Dance of Damsels" | 3:07 |
| 8. | "Diamonds for Gold" (feat. Spencer Sotelo) | 3:29 |
| 9. | "Nocturnal Masquerade" | 2:43 |
| 10. | "Despondency / Dejection" | 3:26 |
| 11. | "Schizophrenic Jubilee" | 3:24 |
| 12. | "Waltz of Madmen" | 4:08 |
| Total length: | | 42:00 |

== Personnel ==
Toothgrinder

- Justin Matthews – lead vocals
- Jason Goss – rhythm guitar
- Matt Mielke – lead guitar
- Matt Arensdorf – bass, backing vocals
- Wills Weller – drums

Additional personnel

- Spencer Sotelo – additional vocals on track 8, additional engineering
- Taylor Larson – production, engineering, mixing
- Paul Leavitt – mastering
