= Phantom Amour =

Studio album by Toothgrinder
- Released: November 10, 2017
- Studio: Oceanic Recordings, Bethesda, MD
- Genre: Progressive metal; metalcore; post-hardcore
- Length: 48:16
- Label: Spinefarm
- Producer: Taylor Larson

Toothgrinder chronology
Nocturnal Masquerade (2016)	Phantom Amour (2017)	I Am (2019)

Singles from Phantom Amour
- 1. "Vagabond" Released: May 8, 2018

Professional ratings
Review scores
Source	Rating
Distorted Sound	9/10
Metal Injection	7.5/10
Metal Hammer	3.5/5 stars
New Noise Magazine	4/5 stars 4.5/5 stars

Phantom Amour is the second studio album by American metalcore band Toothgrinder. The album was released on November 10, 2017, through Spinefarm Records. This is the band's first release with lead guitarist and backing vocalist Johnuel Hasney.

Phantom Amour was produced by Taylor Larson at Oceanic Recordings in Bethesda,

Maryland.

== Reception ==
Upon its release, Phantom Amour received highly positive reviews. Justin Matthews's vocals received praise from critics, while the album's more experimental moments received a mixed reaction.

Dan McHugh of Distorted Sound praised the album's diverse sound, highlighting the electronic elements on "Let It Ride", "Adenium" and "Futile". McHugh also highlighted the title track, saying it "bursts into life with slick grungy tones proceeding at a leisurely pace sliding in and out of serene patches which ooze the restful but emotively engrossing qualities made famous by bands such as Tesseract and The Contortionist." New Noise Magazine reviewer Caleb Newton noted the album's darker and less aggressive sound and called the album "original and thoughtful". Michael Pementel, also of New Noise Magazine, noted the album's varied sound and called the band "one of the most progressive metal acts around today."

A more mixed review came from Metal Injection's Tyler Hersko. Hersko praised "Let It Ride", calling it the album's strongest track. Hersko stated that "most of the album's best tracks are frontloaded" and criticized the album's last three tracks for their "dull riffs and generally uninteresting song structures."

== Track listing ==
All lyrics are written by Justin Matthews; all music is composed by Toothgrinder.

No.	Title	Length
1.	"HVY"	3:35
2.	"The Shadow"	4:01
3.	"Let It Ride"	3:05
4.	"Phantom Amour"	4:17
5.	"Red"	3:13
6.	"Adenium"	3:20
7.	"Jubilee"	3:31
8.	"Paris"	4:29
9.	"Pietà"	3:17
10.	"Snow"	3:42
11.	"Vagabond"	3:23
12.	"Futile"	3:36
13.	"Facing East from a Western Shore"	4:47
Total length:		48:16

On the vinyl edition of the album, tracks 1–5 make up side A, tracks 6–9 make up side B, and tracks 10–13 make up side C. Side D is an etching of the band's logo.

== Personnel ==
Toothgrinder

- Justin Matthews – lead vocals
- Jason Goss – rhythm guitar
- Johnuel Hasney – lead guitar, backing vocals
- Matt Arsendorf – bass, backing vocals
- Wills Weller – drums

Additional

- Taylor Larson – production, engineer, mastering, mixing
- Will Beasley – engineer
- Emir Ayouni – illustrations
- The Forefathers – design, package layout
- Maria Ouellette – marketing
- Darren Dalessio – A&R
