= Misha Mansoor =

American guitarist (born 1984)

- Born: October 31, 1984 (age 41); Bethesda, Maryland, U.S.
- Genres: Progressive metal; djent; progressive metalcore
- Instruments: Guitar, drums, synthesizers, programming
- Years active: 2005–present
- Labels: 3DOT Recordings; Century Media; eOne; Sumerian; Roadrunner; Distort
- Member of: Periphery

Misha Mansoor (born October 31, 1984), also known as Bulb after the name of his solo project, is an American musician, best known as the founder of and one of the three guitarists in the progressive metal band Periphery. He is also a part of the projects Haunted Shores and Four Seconds Ago, and Of Man, Not of Machine.

Mansoor is considered to be one of the forerunners of the djent and modern progressive metal movement and is often erroneously attributed with the invention of the word itself (whose invention he attributes to Meshuggah guitarist Fredrik Thordendal). With Periphery, Mansoor has recorded, produced, and released eight studio albums: a self-titled debut, Periphery II: This Time It's Personal, Juggernaut: Alpha, Juggernaut: Omega, Periphery III: Select Difficulty, Periphery IV: Hail Stan, Periphery V: Djent Is Not a Genre, and A Pale White Dot. Mansoor has been named one of the Top 20 best guitarists of the 2010s by Guitar World magazine.

== Early life ==
Mansoor was born on October 31, 1984, to Ali Mansoor, an economist associated with the World Bank who served a term as Secretary to the Minister of Finance in Mauritius. Mansoor is Mauritian by descent but was born and raised in the US. He grew up in Washington D.C. and moved to Belgium for three years when he was eight years old. He is Jewish, and used his bar mitzvah money to buy his first drums and guitar. Mansoor can speak French. He attended the University of Toronto, originally majoring in sociology before switching to philosophy and eventually dropping out to pursue his passion for music.

== Career ==
=== Bulb (2004–present) ===
Mansoor first started seriously writing and producing music when at college at the University of Toronto. It was here that he and a friend decided to form a band called Bulb, and started posting demos to SoundClick in 2004. While the project did not work out, Mansoor adopted the name Bulb as his online alias and continued to post demos to the Bulb SoundClick account. Mansoor regularly posted his music to the Meshuggah, John Petrucci, SevenString.org, and Andy Sneap Ultimate Metal online forums. Mansoor's reputation as a songwriter and a music producer in the metal scene grew. After Mansoor founded the band Periphery in 2005, he would often transfer songs between the two projects. With the international success of Periphery, Mansoor still continued to release demos and new music under the Bulb name, but at a lesser frequency than before. In May 2013, Mansoor announced that he would be working on his first solo album, which would be written, performed and produced entirely by himself.

Starting June 2020, Mansoor released all of the Bulb Material in his Archives, a set of 10 albums that would be released bi-weekly, starting with the newest Bulb material and going back to the oldest, with 2 of the albums being filled with purely orchestral and electronic music. Mansoor also announced that he was working on his Bulb solo album, due for 2021.

On May 14, 2021, Mansoor released the single "Parabolica", along with its accompanying music video, and announced that the Bulb solo album, titled Moderately Fast, Adequately Furious, would be released on July 16, 2021, via 3DOT Recordings. Mansoor, an avid racing fan, named the track "Parabolica" as a reference to the Curva Parabolica turn on the Monza Circuit in Milan, Italy.

=== Periphery (2005–present) ===
Mansoor formed Periphery in 2005, originally starting out on drums for the band before transitioning to guitar. Periphery went through numerous lineup changes before settling on a lineup of Mansoor, Jake Bowen, and Alex Bois on guitar, Matt Halpern on drums, Tom Murphy on bass, and Spencer Sotelo on vocals. Periphery released their self-titled debut album in 2010 to critical acclaim. In 2011, Bois and Murphy left the band, eventually being replaced with Mark Holcomb and Adam "Nolly" Getgood, solidifying the core Periphery lineup. Periphery went on to release seven more studio albums (Periphery II: This Time It's Personal, Juggernaut: Alpha, Juggernaut: Omega, Periphery III: Select Difficulty, Periphery IV: Hail Stan, Periphery V: Djent Is Not a Genre, and A Pale White Dot) and two EPs (Icarus and Clear), all to critical and commercial success.

=== Haunted Shores (2009–present) ===
In 2009, Mansoor joined the Mark Holcomb-led project Haunted Shores, with the project eventually evolving into solely being the duo of Holcomb and Mansoor. In 2010, Haunted Shores released its first set of new music with Mansoor and guest vocalist Chris Barretto on a split EP with Cyclamen. The project went on unannounced hiatus from 2010–2017, but became active again with the release of the Viscera EP, with features from Jørgen Munkeby and Devin Townsend. In 2022, the band released an album titled Void.

=== Four Seconds Ago (2018–present) ===
In 2018, Mansoor formed the electronic side project Four Seconds Ago with fellow Periphery guitarist Jake Bowen. Their debut album The Vacancy was released in 2018. In 2025, they released their second album, 1000 Needles.

=== Of Man Not of Machine (2008–2011, 2016–present) ===
Mansoor, along with Periphery and Haunted Shores guitarist Mark Holcomb as well as singer Elliot Coleman (Good Tiger, TesseracT, Sky Eats Airplane), founded a side project called "Of Man Not of Machine" (abbreviated OMNOM) that released music from 2008–2011. The project became inactive due to Coleman joining TesseracT in 2011 and with Holcomb and Mansoor finding further success with Periphery with the release of Periphery II: This Time It's Personal. Mansoor and Coleman occasionally began posting small clips of the two writing new OMNOM material to Instagram since 2016, however no releases were announced or made. In April 2022, Periphery drummer and bandmate Matt Halpern released a drum playthrough video for Meinl Cymbals titled "OMNOM Demo 1", officially showcasing a brand new OMNOM song.

=== Other work ===
Mansoor and Steve Vai were selected to contribute to the Halo 2 Anniversary Original Soundtrack. Mansoor was also selected to contribute to the soundtrack of Destiny: Rise of Iron. In 2024, Mansoor contributed the song "The Beast" to the soundtrack of the second season of Arcane.

Mansoor's career as a producer started when he produced and co-wrote the Animals as Leaders' debut self-titled album. Since then, he has produced bands such as Veil of Maya, Born of Osiris, Being and Stray from the Path. He formed a production company called Top Secret Audio in 2013 with Adam "Nolly" Getgood, his former Periphery bandmate. Mansoor also has produced or helped to produce every one of Periphery's studio albums.

== Business ventures ==
Mansoor, along with Periphery members Matt Halpern and Adam "Nolly" Getgood and Good Tiger guitarist Derya Nagle founded the company GetGood Drums (abbreviated GGD), in 2016, with the company name being a pun on Nolly's last name. GGD's primary product focus is amplifier simulation plugins, drum libraries, and drum groove packs. Mansoor regularly composes the music for GGD demos as well as posts video playthroughs of the demos. In 2025, GGD released a drum library of Matt Garstka's signature drum kit. Garstka is the current drummer of the Djent band Animals as Leaders.

In 2016, Mansoor founded Horizon Devices, a guitar pedal and gear company, with friends Mehtab Bhogal and Brian Gilmanov. Horizon Devices has released many guitar pedals and accessories such as strings and picks and is endorsed by artists such as Yvette Young, Ola Englund, and Keith Merrow.

Mansoor is a partner in 3DOT Recordings, along with Periphery bandmates Spencer Sotelo, Jake Bowen, Mark Holcomb and Matt Halpern. The label releases material created by Periphery, all of its associated side projects, and third party bands signed to the label.

Mansoor, along with all of his Periphery bandmates, run a merchandise line called Bottom Ramen. Mansoor also has a partnership with Joey Sturgis Tones and has his own signature plugin Toneforge Misha Mansoor.

== Equipment ==
=== Guitars ===
Mansoor currently is a signature artist for Jackson Guitars, with his signature USA-made Juggernaut HT6 and HT7 guitars having first been released in 2015. Mansoor also regularly uses a relic Stratocaster made by the Jackson LA custom shop. In 2017, Mansoor and Jackson released his more affordable Indonesian-made version of the Juggernauts for the Jackson Pro Series line, and in 2021 Mansoor and Jackson released a Japanese-made version of Mansoor's custom relic So-Cal/Stratocaster as a part of the Jackson MJ line. Before being a Jackson signature artist, Mansoor used guitars by Mayones, Ibanez, Ernie Ball Music Man, Blackmachine, Strandberg, and other brands.

Mansoor is also a signature artist for Bare Knuckle Pickups, with his signature Juggernaut and Ragnarok sets having been released in 2013 and 2017, respectively.

=== Amplifiers ===
Mansoor is a signature artist for Peavey Electronics, with his signature 120 Watt Invective amplifier head being introduced in 2017 and a 25 Watt mini version (the MH) being released in 2019. Mansoor also extensively uses the Fractal Audio Axe-Fx amplifier modeler for studio use and touring. Mansoor also uses amps by EVH, Friedman, Mesa/Boogie, the Grace and Empire amplifiers by Carstens Amplification and various other companies.

== Personal life ==
Mansoor is an avid motorsport and F1 fan. He is also a car enthusiast, having amassed a car collection and driving with Animals as Leaders guitarist and fellow car enthusiast Tosin Abasi.

== Influences ==
Mansoor cites several musicians as influences from a wide range of genres. Notably, he cites John Petrucci, Allan Holdsworth, Ron Jarzombek and Fredrik Thordendal as being important to his development as a guitar player. Other notable artists and bands include Devin Townsend, Nevermore, Guthrie Govan, Opeth, Gojira, Porcupine Tree and Textures.

== Discography ==
=== With Periphery ===
- Periphery (2010)
- Icarus EP (2011)
- Periphery II: This Time It's Personal (2012)
- Clear (2014)
- Juggernaut: Alpha (2015)
- Juggernaut: Omega (2015)
- Periphery III: Select Difficulty (2016)
- Periphery IV: Hail Stan (2019)
- Periphery V: Djent Is Not a Genre (2023)
- A Pale White Dot (2026)

=== As Bulb ===
- Archives: Volume 1 (2020)
- Archives: Volume 2 (2020)
- Archives: Volume 3 (2020)
- Archives: Volume 4 (2020)
- Archives: Volume 5 (2020)
- Archives: Volume 6 (2020)
- Archives: Volume 7 (2020)
- Archives: Volume 8 (2020)
- Archives: Orchestral (2020)
- Archives: Electronic (2020)
- Moderately Fast, Adequately Furious (2021)

=== With Haunted Shores ===
- Split EP with Cyclamen (2010)
- Viscera (2015)
- Void (2022)

=== With Four Seconds Ago ===
- The Vacancy (2018)
- 1000 Needles (2025)

=== As a producer/songwriter ===
- Stray from the Path – Make Your Own History (2009)
- Animals as Leaders – Animals as Leaders (2009)
- Sol Asunder – Mechanize (2009)
- An Obscure Signal – Creations EP (2010)
- Veil of Maya – Eclipse (2012)
- Animals as Leaders – The Joy of Motion (2014)
- Volumes – No Sleep (2014)
- "Breaking the Covenant" and "Follow in Flight" on Halo 2 Anniversary Original Soundtrack (2014)
- For Mankind (Credits Theme) – Deus Ex: Mankind Divided (Original Soundtrack) (2016)
- Animals as Leaders – Parrhesia (2022)
- "The Beast" – Arcane (2024)
