= Clear (EP) =

EP by Periphery
- Released: January 28, 2014
- Genre: Progressive metal; djent; progressive metalcore
- Length: 29:12
- Label: Sumerian; Century Media

Periphery chronology
Periphery II: This Time It's Personal (2012)	Clear (2014)	Juggernaut: Alpha (2015)

Professional ratings
Review scores
Source	Rating
AllMusic	3.5/5 stars

Clear is the second EP by American progressive metal band Periphery. It was released on January 28, 2014 through Sumerian Records. This EP is an experimental work for the band: aside from the intro track, each member of the band composed a track and covered the role of creative director over that track.

== Background ==
Jake Bowen stated:

Clear is an experiment to explore all of the different writing styles in the band. It's rare when you have a band where every member is capable of writing and producing music. With each member controlling their own track, this recording enabled us to go down any path we chose in terms of style and sound. Every track also contains a melodic theme established in Clear's intro track Overture, this common thread links all of the songs together, even though they all sound wildly different.

— Jake Bowen,

This EP has no artwork, by choice of the band. A preview of "Feed the Ground" surfaced in 2012 originally as a demo for Spencer Sotelo and Matt Halpern's project King Mothership.

== Track listing ==
All lyrics are written by Sotelo.

No.	Title	Music	Length
1.	"Overture" (instrumental)	Mansoor	2:12
2.	"The Summer Jam"	Bowen	4:17
3.	"Feed the Ground"	Halpern, Sotelo	4:38
4.	"Zero" (instrumental)	Mansoor	5:31
5.	"The Parade of Ashes"	Sotelo	5:13
6.	"Extraneous" (instrumental)	Getgood	3:21
7.	"Pale Aura"	Holcomb	4:40
Total length:			29:52

== Personnel ==
Production and performance credits are adapted from the album liner notes.

Periphery

- Spencer Sotelo — vocals
- Misha "Bulb" Mansoor — guitar
- Jake Bowen — guitar
- Mark Holcomb — guitar
- Adam "Nolly" Getgood — bass
- Matt Halpern — drums

Additional musicians

- Nick Johnston — guitar solo on "The Parade of Ashes"

Production

- Misha "Bulb" Mansoor — engineering, mixing on "Overture", "The Summer Jam", "Zero", "Pale Aura"
- Adam "Nolly" Getgood — mastering on "Overture", "The Summer Jam", "Zero", "Extraneous", "Pale Aura"; engineering, mixing on "Extraneous"
- Spencer Sotelo — production on "Feed the Ground", "The Parade of Ashes"; vocal production
- Matt Halpern — production on "Feed the Ground"
- Taylor Larson — production, recording, engineering, mixing, mastering on "Feed the Ground", "The Parade of Ashes"
- Ernie Slenkovich — additional engineering on "Feed the Ground", "The Parade of Ashes"

Studios

- Top Secret Audio — engineering, mixing, mastering of "Overture", "The Summer Jam", "Zero", "Extraneous", "Pale Aura"
- Oceanic studios — recording, mixing, mastering of "Feed the Ground", "The Parade of Ashes"

== Charts ==
Chart (2014)	Peak position
Australian Albums (ARIA)	37
Japanese Albums (Oricon)	134
UK Rock & Metal Albums (OCC)	10
US Billboard 200	62
US Independent Albums (Billboard)	10
US Top Hard Rock Albums (Billboard)	2
US Top Rock Albums (Billboard)	15
