= This World Is Not My Home (Onward to Olympas album) =

Studio album by Onward to Olympas
- Released: January 19, 2010
- Genre: Christian hardcore, Christian metal
- Length: 38:35
- Label: Facedown
- Producer: Jamie King

Onward to Olympas chronology
| Victory at All Costs (2008) | This World Is Not My Home (2010) | The War within Us (2011) |

This World Is Not My Home is the first studio album from Onward to Olympas. Facedown Records released the album on January 19, 2010. Onward to Olympas worked with Jamie King, in the production of this album.

== Critical reception ==
Professional ratings
Review scores
| Source | Rating |
|---|---|
| Cross Rhythms | 7/10 squares |
| Indie Vision Music | 4/5 stars |
| Jesus Freak Hideout | 4/5 stars |
| The New Review | 4.5/5 stars |

Rating the album seven out of ten for Cross Rhythms, Peter John Willoughby writes, "they have cultivated their sound, blending progressive metal, straight hardcore, and elements of death metal ... The guitar work is much more technical than I have come to expect from most hardcore/metalcore bands." Scott Fryberger, awarding the album four stars from Jesus Freak Hideout, states, "Onward To Olympas have an album on their hands that is definitely one of the best on all of Facedown." Giving the album four stars at Indie Vision Music, Michael Mayer III says, "Onward to Olympas have released one of the better albums in the genre in recent memory." Eric Burnet, awarding the album four and a half stars by The New Review, describes, "Wow, I did not expect to be praising this album so highly." Ronak Ghorbani, writing a review for Exclaim!, says, "Onward to Olympas deliver a solid first release with The World Is Not My Home."

== Track listing ==
All tracks are written by Onward to Olympas

| No. | Title | Length |
|---|---|---|
| 1. | "Unstoppable" | 4:18 |
| 2. | "Enemies" | 3:26 |
| 3. | "Don't Cry to Me" | 3:51 |
| 4. | "Her Best Words Were Goodbye" | 3:19 |
| 5. | "Overcoming" | 3:09 |
| 6. | "Sink of Swim" | 3:17 |
| 7. | "Awake in a Dream" | 4:26 |
| 8. | "Presence at a Funeral" | 4:22 |
| 9. | "The Lost Generation" | 4:17 |
| 10. | "This World Is Not My Home" | 4:10 |
| Total length: | | 38:35 |

== Credits ==
Onward To Olympas

- Justin Allman - Bass
- Matt Burnside - Drums
- Justin Gage - Guitar, Clean Vocals
- Andrew Higginbotham - Guitar
- Kramer Lowe - Unclean Vocals

Additional Musicians

- Taisha Beathea - Vocals
- Nick Helvey - Piano
- Nathan Moore - Vocals

Production

- Jamie King - Engineer, Mastering, Mixing, Producer
- Dave Quiggle - Artwork, Cover Art, Layout
