= Indicator (Onward to Olympas album) =

Studio album by Onward to Olympas
- Released: October 9, 2012
- Genre: Christian hardcore, Christian metal
- Length: 32:50
- Label: Facedown
- Producer: Taylor Larson

Onward to Olympas chronology
The War within Us (2011)	Indicator (2012)

Indicator is the third and final studio album from Onward to Olympas. Facedown Records released the album on October 9, 2012. Onward to Olympas worked with Taylor Larson, in the production of this album.

== Critical reception ==
Professional ratings
Review scores
Source	Rating
Alternative Press	2/5 stars
Cross Rhythms	7/10 squares
Jesus Freak Hideout	4/5 stars
The New Review	2.5/5 stars

Awarding the album two stars from Alternative Press, Dan Slessor states, "Indicator is a record for the already converted, and there’s nothing wrong with that, per se." Ian Webber, rating the album a seven out of ten for Cross Rhythms, writes, "With this release OTO have produced a competent third recording. It may well be lost amongst more established acts but will certainly be appreciated by their fans." Giving the album four stars at Jesus Freak Hideout, Scott Fryberger says, "Onward To Olympas have another solid hardcore album in Indicator." Jonathan Anderson, awarding the album two and a half stars by The New Review, describes, "Indicator simply has not reached the bar set by its predecessors."

== Track listing ==
All tracks are written by Onward to Olympas

No.	Title	Length
1.	"Indicate/Destroy"	0:13
2.	"Strange Forest" (featuring Cas Haruna)	2:19
3.	"Wolf's Jaw"	3:09
4.	"Circles & Illusions"	3:23
5.	"Never Hold Back" (featuring Ryan Leitru of For Today)	3:19
6.	"Breakthrough" (featuring Zach Riner of Sent By Ravens)	1:12
7.	"Division"	3:04
8.	"Ceasing Time"	3:32
9.	"The Truth in Foundations"	4:02
10.	"Paralysis"	0:16
11.	"Royal State"	3:55
12.	"Holding the Aspects" (featuring Mike Perez)	4:26
Total length:		32:50

== Credits ==
Onward To Olympas

- Justin Allman - Bass
- Andrew Higginbotham - Guitar
- Kramer Lowe - Unclean Vocals
- Mark Hudson - Drums, Clean Vocals
- Kyle Phillips - Guitar, Backing Unclean Vocals

Additional Musicians

- Cas Haruna - Guest Vocals on track 1
- Ryan Leitru (For Today) - Guest Vocals on track 5
- Zach Riner (Sent By Ravens) - Guest Vocals on track 6
- Mike Perez - Guest Vocals on track 12

Production

- Taylor Larson - Producer
- Dave Quiggle - Cover Art, Layout
