= Matt Halpern =

American drummer

- Halpern in 2011

Background information
- Born: June 21, 1983 (age 43)
- Origin: Baltimore, Maryland, U.S.
- Genres: Progressive metal; djent; progressive metalcore; pop-punk
- Occupation: Drummer
- Member of: Periphery
- Formerly of: Animals as Leaders
- Website: matthalpern.com

Matt Halpern (born June 21, 1983) is an American drummer best known for his work with progressive metal band Periphery.

== Biography ==
Born in Baltimore, Halpern took an interest in music at a young age and got his first kids drum set aged 3, before switching to a full-sized one at 6 and taking private drum lessons. At a young age, he started to perform extensively throughout the northeast of the United States on a weekly basis. When he was 17 he formed Spinfire with his friend Evan Taubenfeld and released an eponymous EP. Throughout college Halpern sustained himself by teaching drums and performing in local bar gigs. After college, he toured with a number of local bands including The Underwater out of York, PA and a band with long time friend Dan Book called Armoreta before joining instrumental progressive metal band Animals as Leaders in 2008. In 2009, after his stint with Animals as Leaders, Halpern joined progressive metal band Periphery, replacing the departing Travis Orbin.

In 2012 Halpern launched Bandhappy.com, an educational website where students had the opportunity to take live one-on-one video lessons with various established artists. In 2014 Halpern shut down the site citing his busy schedule with Periphery and as a drum educator as the reason why.

In 2016, alongside bandmates Adam "Nolly" Getgood and Misha Mansoor, Halpern developed GetGood Drums, a sample-based drum software synthesizer.

On December 1, Halpern joined Mick Gordon and Sonic Mayhem on stage at The Game Awards 2016, where they performed a short medley of "Rip and Tear" and "BFG Division" from the soundtrack of Doom and "Descent Into Cerberon" from the soundtrack of Quake II.

In 2018, Periphery left Sumerian Records and founded their own independent record label 3DOT Recordings.

In 2012, Halpern formed a rock group called The Mothership with his Periphery bandmate Spencer Sotelo. In 2020, Sotelo revived the project, now rechristened King Mothership, alongside Halpern on drums and Tai Wright (former drummer for Slaves) on bass, and released their debut album The Ritual on October 2, 2020.

== Equipment ==
Halpern uses and endorses Pearl drums and hardware, Meinl cymbals, Promark drumsticks, and Evans drumheads. He previously endorsed Mapex and Yamaha drums and hardware.

Over the years Halpern developed a number of signature products, such as the Matt Halpern signature snare drum with Pearl Drums, signature drum key for drumkeyshop.com, Promark signature drumsticks, the Meinl Artist Concept Double Down Stack, and the Mapex Black Panther Wraith snare drum.

== Discography ==
=== Spinfire ===
- Spinfire (2000)

=== The Underwater ===
- Forces (2008)

=== Periphery ===
- Periphery (2010)
- Periphery II: This Time It's Personal (2012)
- Juggernaut: Alpha (2015)
- Juggernaut: Omega (2015)
- Periphery III: Select Difficulty (2016)
- Periphery IV: Hail Stan (2019)
- Periphery V: Djent Is Not a Genre (2023)
- A Pale White Dot (2026)

=== King Mothership ===
- The Ritual (2020)

=== As featured musician ===
- A Fate Worse Than Loneliness EP (2026) – Showing Teeth
- The Most Negative Day of the Year – Good Tiger (2026)
