= Onward to Olympas =

American metalcore band

- Origin: Salisbury, North Carolina
- Genres: Christian hardcore, Christian metal, melodic metalcore
- Years active: 2005 – March 29, 2014, September 3, 2015
- Labels: Facedown, Diesel
- Past members: Kramer Lowe; Kyle Phillips; Andrew Higginbotham; Justin Allman; Mark Hudson; Nick Helvey; Andy Simmons; Justin Gage; Matt Burnside; Chris Davis
- Website: facebook.com/onwardtoolympas

Onward to Olympas was an American metalcore band from Salisbury, North Carolina. The band started making music in 2005, and disbanded in 2013. Their membership was vocalists, Chris Davis and Kramer Lowe, guitarists and vocalist, Andy Simmons, Justin Gage, and Kyle Phillips, drummer and vocalist, Mark Hudson, guitarist, Andrew Higginbotham, bass guitarist, Justin Allman, and drummers, Matt Burnside, Nick Helvey. The band released one independently made album, The End of the Beginning, in 2007, and their lone extended play, Victory at All Costs, in 2008. Their first studio album, This World Is Not My Home, was released by Facedown Records, in 2010. The subsequent studio album, The War within Us, was released by Facedown Records, in 2011. They released, Indicator, with Facedown Records, in 2012, and this was their third and final studio album.

== Background ==
Onward to Olympas was a Christian hardcore and Christian metal band from Salisbury, North Carolina. Their members were vocalists, Chris Davis and Kramer Lowe, guitarists and vocalist, Andy Simmons, Justin Gage, and Kyle Phillips, drummer and vocalist, Mark Hudson, guitarist, Andrew Higginbotham, bass guitarist, Justin Allman, and drummers, Matt Burnside, and Nick Helvey. The band announced on their Facebook page, that the original line-up would reunite to play their debut studio album, This World Is Not My Home, all the way through on September 3, 2015 for it being five-years-old.

== Music history ==
The band commenced as a musical entity in 2005, with their first release, The End of the Beginning, an album that was released independently in 2007. They released an extended play, Victory at All Costs, in 2008, also independently. Their first studio album, This World Is Not My Home, was released by Facedown Records on January 19, 2010. The subsequent studio album, The War within Us, was released by Facedown Records on March 15, 2011. They released, Indicator, another studio album, with Facedown Records on October 9, 2012. This was their final release, as they disbanded on March 29, 2014.

== Members ==
Last known line-up

- Kramer Lowe – unclean vocals (2009–2014, 2015) (now in Forevermore)
- Justin Gage – guitar, clean vocals (2006–2010, 2015) Currently area director of manufacturing at a large Corporation
- Andrew Higginbotham – guitar (2009–2014, 2015)
- Justin Allman – bass (2006–2014, 2015)
- Matt Burnside – drums (2006–2010, 2015)

Past members

- Nick Helvey – drums (2010–2011)
- Andy Simmons – guitar, clean vocals (2010–2011)
- Kyle Phillips – guitar, unclean vocals (2011–2014)
- Mark Hudson – drums, clean vocals (2011–2014)
- Chris Davis – unclean vocals (2006–2009)

Timeline

== Discography ==
Studio albums

- This World Is Not My Home (January 19, 2010, Facedown)
- The War Within Us (March 15, 2011, Facedown)
- Indicator (October 9, 2012, Facedown)

Independent albums

- The End of the Beginning (July 7, 2007, Independent)

EPs

- Victory at All Costs (2008, Independent)
