= Periphery III: Select Difficulty =

Studio album by Periphery
- Released: July 22, 2016
- Genres: Progressive metal; djent; progressive metalcore
- Length: 64:06
- Labels: Sumerian; Century Media; Roadrunner
- Producers: Misha Mansoor; Adam Getgood

Periphery chronology
Juggernaut: Omega (2015)	Periphery III: Select Difficulty (2016)	Periphery IV: Hail Stan (2019)

Singles from Periphery III: Select Difficulty
- 1. "The Price Is Wrong" Released: May 25, 2016; 2. "Flatline" Released: June 24, 2016; 3. "Marigold" Released: July 8, 2016

Periphery III: Select Difficulty is the fifth studio album by American progressive metal band Periphery. The album was released July 22, 2016 through Sumerian Records, and was produced by Misha Mansoor and Adam Getgood. The opening track, "The Price Is Wrong", was nominated for Best Metal Performance in the 59th Annual Grammy Awards. It is the last album the band released on this label. It is also the last album to feature bassist Adam "Nolly" Getgood as an official member of Periphery before he left the band in 2017, though he still returned on Periphery IV: Hail Stan to produce, engineer, and mix the album, in addition to contributing final bass parts.

== Critical reception ==
Professional ratings
Aggregate scores
Source	Rating
Metacritic	70/100
Review scores
Source	Rating
AllMusic	3.5/5 stars
Exclaim!	7/10
Rock Sound	6/10

At Metacritic, which assigns a normalized rating out of 100 to reviews from mainstream critics, the album has an average score of 70 out of 100 based on 5 reviews, indicating "generally favorable reviews". Calum Slingerland of Exclaim! praised the band's "drive to keep exploring out of their stylistic box".

== Track listing ==
No.	Title	Length
1.	"The Price Is Wrong"	3:57
2.	"Motormouth"	4:50
3.	"Marigold"	7:20
4.	"The Way the News Goes..."	5:04
5.	"Remain Indoors"	6:10
6.	"Habitual Line-Stepper"	6:52
7.	"Flatline"	5:51
8.	"Absolomb"	7:44
9.	"Catch Fire"	3:54
10.	"Prayer Position"	4:37
11.	"Lune"	7:47
Total length:		64:06

== Personnel ==
Periphery

- Spencer Sotelo – lead vocals
- Misha "Bulb" Mansoor – guitar, synths
- Jake Bowen – guitar, synths
- Mark Holcomb – guitar
- Adam "Nolly" Getgood – bass, guitar
- Matt Halpern – drums, percussion

Production

- Misha "Bulb" Mansoor – production
- Adam "Nolly" Getgood – mixing, engineering
- Ermin Hamidovic – mastering
- Taylor Larson – vocal production
- Spencer Sotelo – vocal production
- Jason Richardson – additional vocal tracking
- Pete Adams – additional vocal tracking
- Randy Slaugh – live orchestra, choir production, engineering
- Ken Dudley – orchestral sessions mixing

Additional personnel

- Emily Rust – violin
- Cymrie Van Drew – violin
- Megumi Terry – violin
- Caryn Bradley – viola
- Kelsey Clegg – viola
- Clayton Wieben – viola
- Chris Morgan – cello
- Robert Willes – cello
- Adam Heyen – French horn
- Tyler Arndt – trumpet
- Tom Francis – bass trombone
- Austin Bentley – choir
- Tiffany Yeates – choir
- Jonathan Allred – choir
- Randy Slaugh – choir
- Eric Slaugh – choir
- Jeffrey Slaugh – choir
- Hayley Malesich – choir
- Kelsey Clegg – choir
- Clayton Wieben – choir
- Taylor Larson – choir
- Emily Piriz – choir
- Nick Day – choir
- Jake Bowen – choir

== Charts ==
Chart (2016)	Peak position
Australian Albums (ARIA)	8
Austrian Albums (Ö3 Austria)	42
Belgian Albums (Ultratop Flanders)	86
Belgian Albums (Ultratop Wallonia)	139
Finnish Albums (Suomen virallinen lista)	22
German Albums (Offizielle Top 100)	39
Japanese Albums (Oricon)	102
New Zealand Heatseekers Albums (RMNZ)	3
Scottish Albums (Official Charts)	45
Swiss Albums (Schweizer Hitparade)	43
UK Albums (Official Charts)	57
US Billboard 200	22
