= Periphery II: This Time It's Personal =

Studio album by Periphery
- Released: July 3, 2012
- Recorded: 2011–2012
- Genre: Progressive metal; djent; progressive metalcore
- Length: 69:00
- Label: Sumerian; Century Media; Roadrunner
- Producer: Misha Mansoor; Adam Getgood

Periphery chronology
Periphery (2010)	Periphery II: This Time It's Personal (2012)	Clear (2014)

Singles from Periphery II: This Time It's Personal
- 1. "Make Total Destroy" Released: June 5, 2012

Periphery II: This Time It's Personal is the second studio album by American progressive metal band Periphery. The album was released on June 29, 2012 through Roadrunner Records in Australia and on July 3 through Sumerian in America. It was produced by Misha Mansoor and Adam Getgood. It is the first record by the band to feature new members Mark Holcomb and Adam "Nolly" Getgood, replacing Alex Bois and Tom Murphy on guitar and bass, respectively.

== Release and promotion ==
On May 30, 2012, Periphery posted an album teaser featuring the intro track "Muramasa." The album's first single, "Make Total Destroy," was released on iTunes Tuesday, June 5. On June 14, 2012, the band released the track "Scarlet" on SiriusXM's Liquid Metal channel. The official stream of the song was released on June 28 on Sumerian Records' YouTube channel. The whole album was also streamed on Metal Hammer's website from June 29 for visitors to listen to.

== Commercial performance ==
The album sold nearly 12,000 copies in its first week of release, reaching #44 on the Billboard 200 list. In Canada, the album debuted at #89 on the Canadian Albums Chart.

It was ranked number 3 in Guitar World's "Top 50 Albums of 2012."

Professional ratings
Review scores
Source	Rating
About.com	4.5/5 stars
AllMusic	4.5/5 stars
Loudwire	3.5/5 stars
MetalSucks	3.5/5 stars

== Track listing ==
No.	Title	Length
1.	"Muramasa"	2:51
2.	"Have a Blast"	5:55
3.	"Facepalm Mute"	4:54
4.	"Ji"	5:15
5.	"Scarlet"	4:09
6.	"Luck as a Constant"	6:05
7.	"Ragnarok"	6:36
8.	"The Gods Must Be Crazy!"	3:38
9.	"Make Total Destroy"	4:27
10.	"Erised"	6:13
11.	"Epoch" (instrumental)	2:11
12.	"Froggin' Bullfish"	5:06
13.	"Mile Zero"	5:31
14.	"Masamune"	6:09
Total length:		69:00

Limited Edition bonus tracks
No.	Title	Length
15.	"Far Out" (instrumental)	3:34
16.	"The Heretic Anthem" (Slipknot cover)	3:49

== Personnel ==
- Spencer Sotelo — lead vocals
- Misha "Bulb" Mansoor — guitar, synths, production
- Jake Bowen — guitar, synths, programming
- Mark Holcomb — guitar
- Adam "Nolly" Getgood – bass, guitar, production
- Matt Halpern — drums, percussion

Guest musicians

- Guest guitar solo on "Have a Blast" by Guthrie Govan
- Guest guitar solo on "Erised" by John Petrucci of Dream Theater
- Guest guitar solo on "Mile Zero" by Wes Hauch, formerly of The Faceless
- Alice McIlrath — violin
- Lezlie Smith — cello

Production

- Misha "Bulb" Mansoor – producer
- Adam "Nolly" Getgood – producer
- Taylor Larson – engineering, mixing
- Will Donnelly – additional engineering
- Logan Mader – mastering
- Randy Slaugh – string arrangement and production (on "Have a Blast")
- Ken Dudley – engineer

== Charts ==
Chart (2012)	Peak position
Australian Albums (ARIA)	46
Finnish Albums (Suomen virallinen lista)	46
Japanese Albums (Oricon)	132
UK Albums (OCC)	115
UK Album Downloads (OCC)	72
UK Rock & Metal Albums (OCC)	5
US Billboard 200	44
US Independent Albums (Billboard)	6
