= Juggernaut: Omega =

Studio album by Periphery
- Released: January 27, 2015
- Genres: Progressive metal; djent; progressive metalcore
- Length: 39:21
- Labels: Sumerian; Century Media; Roadrunner; Distort
- Producer: Periphery

Periphery chronology
Juggernaut: Alpha (2015)	Juggernaut: Omega (2015)	Periphery III: Select Difficulty (2016)

Singles from Juggernaut: Omega
- 1. "The Bad Thing" Released: December 4, 2014; 2. "Graveless" Released: December 31, 2014

Juggernaut: Omega is the fourth studio album by American progressive metal band Periphery. It is the second part of a double album, the first being Juggernaut: Alpha. The double album was released on January 27, 2015, by Sumerian Records. Juggernaut: Omega debuted at No. 25 on the U.S. Billboard 200.

== Critical reception ==
Professional ratings
Review scores
Source	Rating
AllMusic	4.5/5 stars
AntiHero Magazine	9.5/10 stars
Exclaim!	8/10
MetalSucks	4.5/5 stars

Juggernaut: Omega received critical acclaim. In a review for Exclaim!, Calum Slingerland wrote that Omega is very much the "yin to Alpha's yang," highlighted by "the jerky chugging of "The Bad Thing," the thrashy "Graveless" and the slow-burning "Hell Below," which comes complete with a tasteful jazz-fusion outro." AntiHero Magazine called the Juggernaut albums as a whole Periphery's "magnum opus", specifically praising the vocals.

== Track listing ==
No.	Title	Length
1.	"Reprise"	1:25
2.	"The Bad Thing"	5:54
3.	"Priestess"	5:04
4.	"Graveless"	3:56
5.	"Hell Below"	3:43
6.	"Omega"	11:44
7.	"Stranger Things"	7:35
Total length:		39:21

== Personnel ==
Writing, performance and production credits are adapted from the album liner notes.

Periphery

- Spencer Sotelo – vocals
- Misha Mansoor – guitar
- Jake Bowen – guitar
- Mark Holcomb – guitar
- Adam "Nolly" Getgood – bass
- Matt Halpern – drums

Production

- Periphery – production
- Spencer Sotelo – production (vocals only)
- Adam "Nolly" Getgood – engineering, mixing
- Taylor Larson – additional engineering (at Oceanic Recording)
- Ernie Slenkovic – additional engineering (at Oceanic Recording)
- Eric Emery – additional engineering (at Emery Recording Studios)
- Ermin Hamidovic – mastering

Artwork and design

- Justin Randall – cover illustration
- Tim Swim – additional illustration
- Daniel McBride – layout, design

Studios

- Oceanic Recording – engineering
- Emery Recording Studios – engineering
- Top Secret Audio – mixing
- Systematic Productions – mastering

== Charts ==
Chart (2015)	Peak position
Australian Albums (ARIA)	25
Austrian Albums (Ö3 Austria)	48
Japanese Albums (Oricon)	119
Scottish Albums (Official Charts)	43
UK Albums (Official Charts)	45
US Billboard 200	25
US Independent Albums (Billboard)	4
