= Juggernaut: Alpha =

Studio album by Periphery
- Released: January 27, 2015
- Genres: Progressive metal; djent; progressive metalcore
- Length: 41:25
- Labels: Sumerian; Century Media; Roadrunner; Distort
- Producer: Periphery

Periphery chronology
Clear (2014)	Juggernaut: Alpha (2015)	Juggernaut: Omega (2015)

Singles from Juggernaut: Alpha
- 1. "The Scourge" Released: November 21, 2014; 2. "22 Faces" Released: December 16, 2014; 3. "Alpha" Released: January 5, 2015

Juggernaut: Alpha is the third studio album by American progressive metal band Periphery. It is the first part of a double album, the second part of which is Juggernaut: Omega. The double album was released on January 27, 2015, by Sumerian Records. Juggernaut: Alpha debuted at No. 22 on the U.S. Billboard 200.

== Critical reception ==
Professional ratings
Aggregate scores
Source	Rating
Metacritic	84/100
Review scores
Source	Rating
AllMusic	4/5 stars
Exclaim!	8/10
MetalSucks	4.5/5 stars
Sputnikmusic	4/5 stars

On Metacritic, which assigns a normalized rating out of 100 to reviews from mainstream critics, the album has an average score of 84 out of 100 based on 4 reviews, indicating "universal acclaim". In a positive review for Exclaim!, Calum Slingerland wrote that "Alpha is the brighter and longer disc of the two, varied in its execution by walking a line between challenging, progressive moments and more accessible fare," citing "the soaring choruses and memorable hooks" of "Heavy Heart" and the record's title track that "highlight the group's increased incorporation of non-metal music."

== Track listing ==
All lyrics are written by Periphery; all music is composed by Periphery.

No.	Title	Length
1.	"A Black Minute"	4:16
2.	"MK Ultra"	2:50
3.	"Heavy Heart"	4:22
4.	"The Event" (instrumental)	1:45
5.	"The Scourge"	5:36
6.	"Alpha"	5:31
7.	"22 Faces"	3:52
8.	"Rainbow Gravity"	4:39
9.	"Four Lights" (instrumental)	2:18
10.	"Psychosphere"	6:16
Total length:		41:25

== Personnel ==
Writing, performance and production credits are adapted from the album liner notes.

Periphery

- Spencer Sotelo – vocals
- Misha Mansoor – guitar
- Jake Bowen – guitar
- Mark Holcomb – guitar
- Adam "Nolly" Getgood – bass
- Matt Halpern – drums

Production

- Periphery – production
- Spencer Sotelo – production (vocals only)
- Adam "Nolly" Getgood – engineering, mixing
- Taylor Larson – additional engineering (at Oceanic Recording)
- Ernie Slenkovic – additional engineering (at Oceanic Recording)
- Eric Emery – additional engineering (at Emery Recording Studios)
- Ermin Hamidovic – mastering

Artwork and design

- Justin Randall – cover illustration
- Tim Swim – additional illustration
- Daniel McBride – layout, design

Studios

- Oceanic Recording – engineering
- Emery Recording Studios – engineering
- Top Secret Audio – mixing
- Systematic Productions – mastering

== Charts ==
Chart (2015)	Peak position
Australian Albums (ARIA)	22
Austrian Albums (Ö3 Austria)	49
German Albums (Offizielle Top 100)	83
Japanese Albums (Oricon)	111
Scottish Albums (Official Charts)	41
UK Albums (Official Charts)	43
UK Rock & Metal Albums (Official Charts)	5
US Billboard 200	22
US Digital Albums (Billboard)	18
US Independent Albums (Billboard)	3
US Top Hard Rock Albums (Billboard)	2
US Top Rock Albums (Billboard)	4
