= Periphery (band) =

American progressive metal band

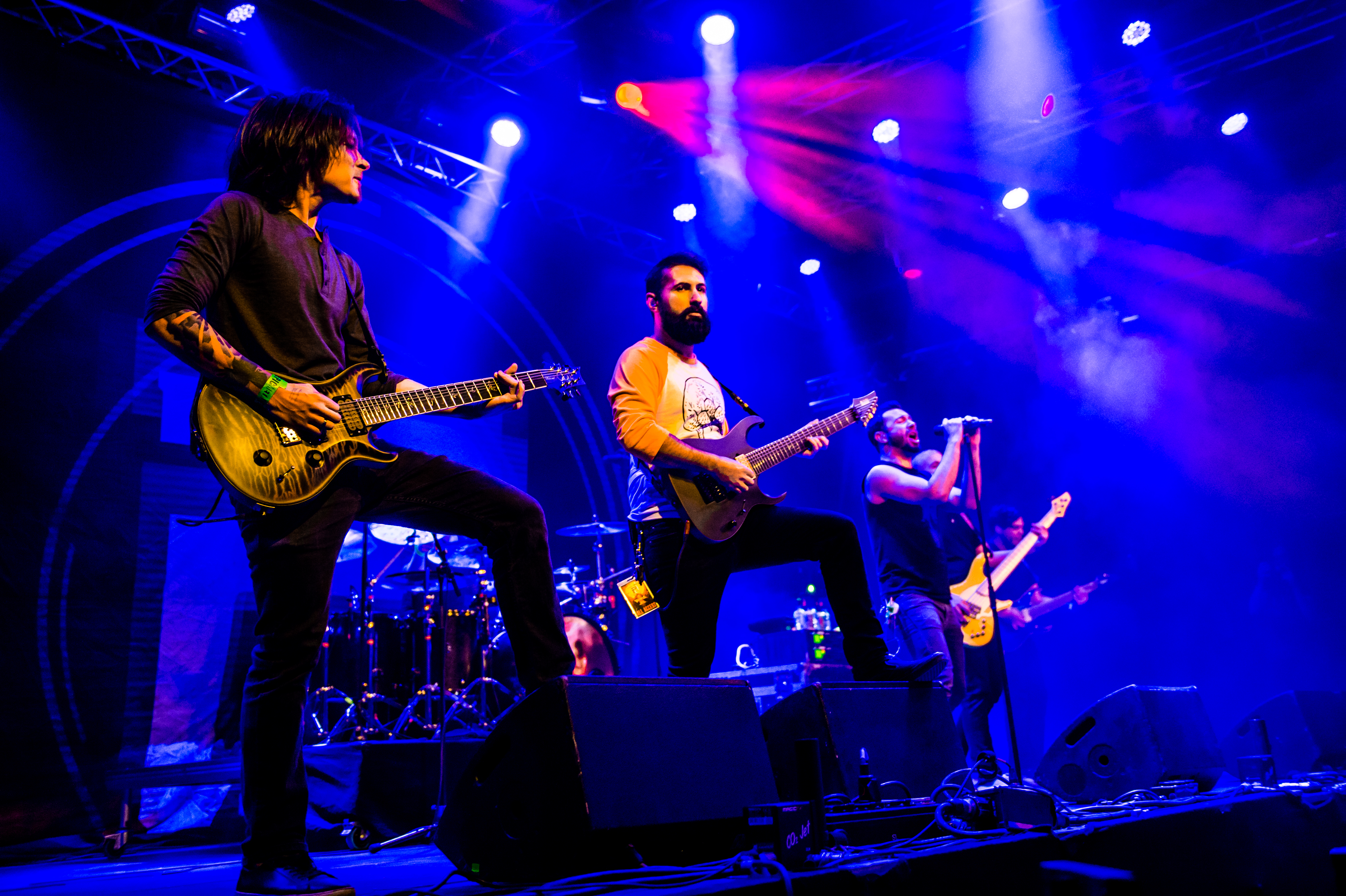
- Periphery performing in 2015. Left to right: Mark Holcomb, Jake Bowen, Spencer Sotelo, Adam Getgood, Misha Mansoor

Background information
- Origin: Washington, D.C., U.S.
- Genres: Progressive metal; djent; progressive metalcore
- Years active: 2005–present
- Labels: 3DOT Recordings; Century Media; eOne; Sumerian; Roadrunner; Distort
- Members: Misha Mansoor; Jake Bowen; Matt Halpern; Spencer Sotelo; Mark Holcomb
- Past members: Anthony Marshall; Jason S. Berlin; Jake Veredika; Casey Sabol; Travis Orbin; Chris Barretto; Alex Bois; Tom Murphy; Adam Getgood
- Website: periphery.net

Periphery is an American progressive metal band that was formed in Washington, D.C., in 2005. Their musical style has been described as progressive metal, djent, and progressive metalcore. They are considered one of the pioneers of the djent movement within progressive metal. They have also received a Grammy nomination. The band consists of vocalist Spencer Sotelo, guitarists Misha Mansoor, Mark Holcomb, Jake Bowen, and drummer Matt Halpern.

The band has released eight studio albums: their self-titled debut, Periphery II: This Time It's Personal, the double album Juggernaut: Alpha and Omega, Periphery III: Select Difficulty, Periphery IV: Hail Stan, Periphery V: Djent Is Not a Genre and A Pale White Dot. They have also released two EPs: Icarus EP and Clear. All Periphery material is self-produced by the members of the band.

== History ==
=== Formation and early line-up changes (2005–2009) ===
Periphery was formed in 2005 by guitarist Misha Mansoor, who slowly gained a reputation on the Internet via a regularly updated Soundclick account, the Meshuggah and John Petrucci forums, and the sevenstring.org message boards. Before and during Periphery's tenure in the metal scene, Mansoor developed a reputation for doing his own audio production, the majority of which was performed with a home computer and a Pod XT. Mansoor has continued to update his personal project, Bulb, often transferring songs between the two projects. Mansoor also continues to be involved in a number of other musical projects, including Haunted Shores, Four Seconds Ago, and Of Man Not of Machine.

Periphery went through a number of lineup changes during its early history. Originally, Misha played drums and guitar in the band, but began scoping out local talent and found local drummer Jason S. Berlin, and then switched permanently to guitar. Berlin was planning to pursue interests in Los Angeles and was replaced upon departure by Travis Orbin. Between 2005 and 2009, Periphery worked with vocalists Jake Veredika, Casey Sabol and Chris Barretto, gradually moving from a Meshuggah-influenced sound to a more ambient, melodic sound, with a focus on innovative production.

Periphery has toured extensively since 2008, supporting artists including DevilDriver, Dream Theater, Emmure, Veil of Maya, Animals as Leaders, God Forbid, Darkest Hour, The Dillinger Escape Plan, Fear Factory, Between the Buried and Me, and Fair to Midland.

=== Spencer Sotelo, Matt Halpern and self-titled debut album (2010–2011) ===
In 2009, Travis Orbin left the band to join Sky Eats Airplane. He was then replaced by Matt Halpern, who was scouted by Mansoor whilst playing for a local pop band. In January 2010, Sumerian and Periphery announced on April 20, as the release date of the band's self-titled debut album, to be distributed by Sumerian Records in the United States; Distort Entertainment in Canada; Roadrunner Records in Australia; Century Media Records in Germany, and the rest of the world. On January 20, 2010, amid speculation that they had changed vocalists again, Periphery uploaded an album sampler with vocals by Spencer Sotelo, a San Diego native who was later announced to be Periphery's new vocalist, replacing Chris Barretto, who had been fired from the band due to personal differences (Mansoor referring to him as a "diva"), resulting in a minor feud that would not be resolved until late 2013.

Periphery released their self-titled debut album, Periphery, through Sumerian Records on April 20, 2010. It debuted at No. 128 on the Billboard Top 200, as well as No. 2 on the Billboard Heatseekers chart. To support the album: Periphery played multiple tours around the US and Canada; a short tour of Australia along with The Dillinger Escape Plan, and a headlining tour of the UK and mainland Europe in February 2011. The band's first headlining tour, "League Of Extraordinary Djentlemen Tour", had support from TesseracT and Monuments in the UK, while their mainland European shows included Monuments and The Safety Fire. The band ran into multiple health issues during the tour; Spencer Sotelo had a case of bronchitis and was regularly unable to perform the entire set. Jake Bowen fell and broke a finger in the first week of the UK tour and was unable to play for the rest of their headlining tour. He recovered and joined the band during the last couple of shows on their tour with Fair to Midland and Scale the Summit right before they dropped out of the tour.

On March 22, 2011, Periphery released a cover of Metallica's song "One", which was recorded for the Homefront video game soundtrack and was released as a free download on the Homefront main website.

=== Icarus EP and addition of Mark Holcomb (2011) ===
On January 19, 2011, the music video for "Jetpacks Was Yes!" was posted on NME. The video features a re-recorded and re-structured version of the song which was released on Icarus EP. Periphery's first single, from their Icarus EP titled "Frak the Gods", was released on March 24.

On July 6, 2011, Periphery announced via a MySpace blog post that the band had parted ways with guitarist Alex Bois. However, they did not change touring schedules, hiring Mark Holcomb and Adam "Nolly" Getgood (of British progressive metal band Red Seas Fire) to play Alex's parts during live shows until they found a permanent replacement.

On September 7, 2011, they were announced as the opening act for Dream Theater on the European leg of A Dramatic Turn of Events Tour starting in January 2012. In October 2011, the band announced that Holcomb was now the band's full-time guitarist, and in November bassist Tom Murphy decided to leave the band. This led to Getgood being assigned the role of bassist for their European tour with Dream Theater. The band also hired Holcomb's brother Jeff as a stand-in bass player for their 2012 US tour with Protest The Hero, Jeff Loomis, The Safety Fire and Today I Caught the Plague.

On February 21, 2012, the band re-released their debut album with a new single on iTunes entitled "Passenger". This was a partially re-recorded version of an old Haunted Shores song.

=== Periphery II: This Time It's Personal (2012–2013) ===
Periphery then entered the studio to work on their next two full-length releases to record reworked "Bulb" demos as well as completely new material written by the full band. The album was to be produced by Mansoor and Getgood and engineered and mixed by Taylor Larson (Sky Eats Airplane, Of Legends, Life on Repeat).

In July 2011, Mansoor elaborated on the forthcoming albums in Australian magazine Mixdown. He confirmed that there would be two albums recorded, and that one would be a concept album. Mansoor has had an interest in a concept album for quite some time, stating that "[he] wanted to get this concept album out there. It's been an idea for years and years." Mansoor also revealed that the band would release the albums separately, saying "[they]'ll probably do a staggered release, three to six months apart" and that "[he] really want[s] them to be these separate bodies of work, because they will sound different, and be completely different approaches, too."

Periphery II: This Time It's Personal was made available for streaming on YouTube on June 28, 2012. Hours later, the band announced that Getgood had officially joined the band, his role in the band mostly being a bassist but also contributing to guitar parts in the studio (a role which he had already taken on during the recording of Periphery II), effectively making him the "multi-instrumentalist" of the band. Jeff Holcomb continued to perform with Periphery during the 2012 Summer Slaughter tour until they had to drop out due to a family emergency; this was done so that Getgood could perform his last show with Red Seas Fire at the inaugural UK Tech-Metal Fest.

Since the 2012 Summer Slaughter tour Jeff Holcomb has remained a regular part of the band's crew and still performs as a stand-in bass player when required. As well as this, he makes documentary films about the band's tours and directed the music video for Ragnarok.

=== Clear EP (2013–2014) ===
Spencer Sotelo hinted in two tweets in September 2013 that Periphery were planning to release a new EP, the writing for which was already well under way, to tide their fans over until the release of Juggernaut, the band's much anticipated third full-length album.

In October, it was announced that Misha Mansoor, Mark Holcomb, and Jake Bowen were having signature pickups released; the Bare Knuckle Pickups Juggernaut, the Seymour Duncan Alpha/Omega and DiMarzio Titan pickups, respectively. It was also announced that Bowen's Ibanez LACS "Titan" would be made as a signature guitar.

In November 2013, former singer Chris Barretto made a surprise appearance during an encore of "Icarus Lives!" at the Gramercy Theater. As well as ending the long-standing feud between Chris and Periphery, it also marked the end of Periphery's "This Tour is Personal" headlining tour.

In December, Periphery announced a new release entitled Clear, set for release on January 28, 2014. Clear is a separate project from Juggernaut and was built around a unique concept: each track apart from the opener "Overture" was assigned to a different member of the band, who acted as the "creative director" for their respective song, and every track shares a theme from "Overture" to link each track in the release together. The band insisted that it should not be considered an EP as at 30 minutes in length it is longer than most EPs, but should not be classified as an album.

=== Juggernaut (2014–2016) ===
"Juggernaut" is a concept which was under development by the band for several years. Misha had initially written a series of demos early in Periphery's history, which were sections of a planned extended composition with the "Juggernaut" title; this extended composition contained Periphery's breakthrough songs "Icarus Lives!" and "Jetpacks Was Yes!" as some of its sections. The idea of an extended piece was eventually scrapped and developed into a concept which would span an entire album.

During the Periphery II album cycle it was planned that Juggernaut would be released 3–6 months after Periphery II as part of a double album. However, this plan was also dropped due to Periphery's touring commitments, pushing the release to 2015. The band delayed writing and pre-production even more to make time for writing and recording Clear. In early July 2014, Periphery began tracking and recording songs for Juggernaut.

On the Escape From The Studio Tour, lead vocalist Spencer Sotelo stated that Juggernaut had been finished and would be released sometime in January 2015 through Sumerian Records. On November 5, 2014, Periphery announced a tour in support of the new record, which was released on January 27, 2015. They revealed that it will in fact be a double album, consisting of Juggernaut: Alpha and Juggernaut: Omega, and that support acts for the album release tour in early 2015 will be Nothing More, Wovenwar, and Thank You Scientist.

=== Periphery III: Select Difficulty (2016–2018) ===
In early 2016, various Periphery members announced through social media that they were working on what would become their fifth studio album. Matt Halpern announced on his Instagram account that drums for the new untitled album would be tracked in February 2016. On April 26, 2016, Periphery announced on their official Facebook page that their new album would be called Periphery III: Select Difficulty and that it would be released on July 22 the same year. The first new song, "The Price Is Wrong", was released on May 25. The next song to be released was "Flatline", which was made available to stream on YouTube on June 25. "Marigold", the first official music video from the album, was released on July 8. "Motormouth" and "The Way the News Goes..." were released to YouTube on July 14 and 15, respectively, followed by the release of "Prayer Position" on July 18. The band was nominated at the 59th Annual Grammy Awards in the Best Metal Performance category for their song "The Price Is Wrong".

Additionally, it was announced that Adam "Nolly" Getgood would be focusing more on his personal production projects and would not be touring with Periphery. The band then decided to use Getgood's backing tracks for their live performances. On August 3, 2017, Getgood announced through Facebook his departure from the band, stating his lack of investment in Periphery, and his wanting to spend more time with his wife, as well as on production and GetGoodDrums. On April 19, 2018, the band's label, Sumerian Records, announced that Periphery was splitting from the label, and their next album would be released on their independent label 3DOT Recordings.

=== Periphery IV: Hail Stan (2018–2020) ===
In April 2018, Mansoor uploaded a 10-minute YouTube video containing various clips from writing sessions with Bowen and Holcomb. In October, the band revealed that they had begun tracking songs for their sixth studio album, and that it would be released in 2019. It was also revealed that Adam "Nolly" Getgood, former bassist and now studio bassist only for the band, would be tracking and recording bass for the album and would once again be heavily involved in mixing, producing, and engineering the album, but would not contribute to the writing process. On January 27, 2019, Mark Holcomb stated that the next Periphery album would be released in April. On February 6, 2019, the band released a single called "Blood Eagle", and on March 1, Periphery released "Garden in the Bones", both from their studio album Periphery IV: Hail Stan, released on April 5, 2019, through their own label, 3DOT Recordings.

=== Periphery V: Djent Is Not a Genre (2021–2026) ===
On March 11, 2021, various members of Periphery posted an in-studio photo of the band on social media, announcing the first writing session for their seventh studio album. On October 12, 2022, Jake Bowen announced that recording for the new album had been completed and was now ready for mastering. On January 9, 2023, after several days of teaser videos, the band announced that their seventh studio album would be titled Periphery V: Djent Is Not a Genre and would release on March 10, 2023. They also revealed the album cover and released the first two singles, "Wildfire" and "Zagreus", on January 12. Both singles include references to material from Juggernaut: Alpha, with the chorus of "Wildfire" reinterpreting the central motif of "The Event", and "Zagreus" featuring a primary riff from "Four Lights". Mansoor also confirmed "Zagreus" was inspired by the award-winning indie video game Hades, as the song is named after the game's protagonist from Greek mythology and features a reference to the game's death leitmotif. On February 16, one month before the album release, the band unveiled the third single "Atropos" and its corresponding music video. On April 22, 2024, Periphery announced that on April 26, 2024, they would be releasing a two-track single (titled 2 Song Acoustic Single), featuring acoustic versions of their songs "Scarlet" (from 2012's Periphery II: This Time It's Personal) and "It's Only Smiles" (from 2019's Periphery IV: Hail Stan), both featuring Mike Dawes, with whom the band toured and performed an acoustic version of "It's Only Smiles" in 2023. A day later, the band announced that the single release would be accompanied by a 7" white and gold vinyl release, limited to 500 copies. The following day, the band announced that a music video for "It's Only Smiles" would be released on the same day as the single. A week later the band announced a music video for "Scarlet".

=== A Pale White Dot (2026–present) ===
On March 30, 2026, the band announced via their social media platforms that their eighth studio album A Pale White Dot would be released on May 15, 2026 via the band's own label, 3DOT Recordings. The album's lead single, "Mr. God", was released on April 2, 2026. The second single for the album, "Everyone Dies Alone", was released on April 23, 2026. Periphery have a European tour (featuring some major festivals such as Download Festival) scheduled for June 2026, shortly after the release of A Pale White Dot.

== Tunings ==
The band uses an extended range of tunings on 6-, 7-, and 8-string guitars. Their songs are predominantly in Drop C in 6-string (C G C F A D) and Drop A♭ in 7-string (A♭ E♭ A♭ D♭ G♭ B♭ E♭). Some songs use standard in 8-string (F♯ B E A D G B E). During the recording of A Pale White Dot, the band started using 6-string 30" baritone guitars tuned to Drop B♭0, played in unison with a 5-string bass.

Song	Tuning
Captain On	Standard 8-string (F♯ B E A D G B E)
Ji	Standard 8-string (F♯ B E A D G B E)
Extraneous	Standard 8-string (F♯ B E A D G B E)
A Black Minute	Standard 8-string (F♯ B E A D G B E)
The Event	Standard 8-string (F♯ B E A D G B E)
22 Faces	Standard 8-string (F♯ B E A D G B E)
Four Lights	Standard 8-string (F♯ B E A D G B E)
Stranger Things	Standard 8-string (F♯ B E A D G B E)
Dracul Gras	Standard 8-string (F♯ B E A D G B E)
Carry On	Standard 8-string (F♯ B E A D G B E)
Totla Mad	Drop C with a low B♭ (B♭ G C F A D)
Frak the Gods	Drop C with a low B♭ (B♭ G C F A D)
Zyglrox	Drop C with a low A (A G C F A D)
Muramasa	Drop C with a low A (A G C F A D)
Alpha	Drop C with a low A (A G C F A D)
The Bad Thing	Drop C with a low A (A G C F A D)
Graveless	Drop C with a low A (A G C F A D)
Remain Indoors	Drop C with a low A (A G C F A D)
Habitual Line-Stepper	Drop C with a low A (A G C F A D)
Lune	Drop C with a low A (A G C F A D)
Prayer Position	Drop C with a low A (A G C F A D)
Chvrch Bvrner	Drop C with a low A (A G C F A D)
Garden in the Bones	Drop C with a low A (A G C F A D)
Follow Your Ghost	Drop C with a low A (A G C F A D)
Talk	Drop C with a low A (A G C F A D)
Malevolent	Drop C with a low A (A G C F A D)
Ragnarok	7-string standard down a half step with seventh stepping tuned to G♭ (G♭ E♭ A♭ D♭ G♭ B♭ E♭)
Hell Below	8-string standard with a low C♯ (C♯ B E A D G B E)
Scarlet	Open Cadd9 (C G C E G D)
A Pale White Dot	Open Cadd9 (C G C E G D)
Racecar	7-string standard tuned down one half step with the sixth string dropped to D♭ (B♭ D♭ A♭ D♭ G♭ B♭ E♭)
Wax Wings	Math rock tuning one and a half steps down (D F♯ A E A C♯)
Reptile	Drop C with a low G (G G C F A D)
Zagreus	Drop C with a low G (G G C F A D)
Mr. God	F Standard a major seventh below standard tuning with a dropped B♭0 (B♭ B♭ E♭ A♭ C F)
Unlocking	F Standard a major seventh below standard tuning with a dropped B♭0 (B♭ B♭ E♭ A♭ C F)
Neon Valley	F Standard a major seventh below standard tuning with a dropped B♭0 (B♭ B♭ E♭ A♭ C F)
Everyone Dies Alone	F Standard a major seventh below standard tuning with a dropped B♭0 (B♭ B♭ E♭ A♭ C F)
Subhuman	8-string standard one half step down (F B♭ E♭ A♭ D♭ G♭ B♭ E♭)

== Other projects ==
Guitarists Mark Holcomb and Misha Mansoor have a side project called Haunted Shores. This project first became active in April 2010, before Holcomb was a member of Periphery, releasing two songs on a split EP with Cyclamen featuring Chris Barretto on vocals. Through the remainder of 2010 and part of 2011, they periodically recorded and released new songs, sometimes featuring guest vocalists like Elliot Coleman or Mike Semesky. However, in late 2011 Holcomb officially joined Periphery, and the project unofficially went on hiatus. Their song "Passenger," which featured guest vocals by Spencer Sotelo, was released as a Periphery song in February 2012, and another song featuring Sotelo's vocals, "Scarlet" was re-recorded and released on Periphery's second album. No new music was released until 2015, when it was revealed that they were recording a 'debut' EP. Viscera was released on November 3, 2015, and featured a re-recorded version of one of their earlier songs ("Harrison Fjord") as well as several new songs.

Mansoor is also part of an electronic music side project with guitarist Jake Bowen, called Four Seconds Ago. Their debut album, The Vacancy, was released September 28, 2018. Their second album 1000 Needles released February 21, 2025. Bowen also produces electronic music on his own, having released the full-length album Isometric on May 31, 2015.

On April 7, 2014, it was announced that vocalist Spencer Sotelo had become the new lead vocalist of post-hardcore band From First to Last. Additionally, Sotelo produces "Trent Reznor-inspired" music under the moniker Endur. Endur's debut album American Parasite was released October 27, 2017.

Mark Holcomb doubles as a professional voice actor in video games, most recently lending his voice to two main characters in the police-procedural RPG Disco Elysium. Holcomb also co-wrote two songs on VUUR's 2016 debut album, "In This Moment, We Are Free – Cities": specifically, the songs "Freedom – Rio" and "Reunite! – Paris."

Many of the members have composed songs for video game soundtracks. The band covered Metallica's "One" for the 2011 game Homefront. Mansoor has composed and produced songs "Follow in Flight" and "Breaking the Covenant" for the Halo 2: Anniversary soundtrack (part of the Halo: The Master Chief Collection) as well as the ending credits theme for the game Deus Ex: Mankind Divided. Former bandmate Adam "Nolly" Getgood mixed "Bury the Light", the theme song for Vergil in Devil May Cry 5, which was inspired by the band's song "Reptile". In 2017, Adam "Nolly" Getgood served as a guest instructor on the Nail The Mix educational platform, where he taught a detailed mixing session for Periphery's song "Prayer Position." Most recently, Mark Holcomb and Jake Bowen announced they were creating music and custom sounds for Warframe, as a part of their March 2025 update.

Mansoor has also worked as a producer on releases by Animals as Leaders, Stray from the Path and Veil of Maya, among others. He also owns the guitar pedal company Horizon Devices, and co-owns software company GetGood Drums alongside Periphery bandmate Matt Halpern and former bandmate Adam "Nolly" Getgood. In 2024, he also wrote and recorded "The Beast" for Arcane's second season published the same year on Netflix.

== Band members ==
Current members

- Misha "Bulb" Mansoor – guitar, programming, synthesizer (2005–present); drums (2005)
- Jake Bowen – guitar, programming, synthesizer (2007–present); backing vocals (2012–present)
- Matt Halpern – drums (2009–present)
- Spencer Sotelo – lead vocals (2010–present)
- Mark Holcomb – guitar (2011–present)

Former members

- Anthony Marshall – guitar (2005)
- Jason S. Berlin – drums (2005)
- Jacob Tull (sometimes credited as Jake Veredika) – lead vocals (2005–2007)
- Casey Sabol – lead vocals (2007–2008)
- Travis Orbin – drums (2005–2009)
- Chris Barretto – lead vocals (2008–2010)
- Alex Bois – guitar, backing vocals (2005–2011)
- Tom Murphy – bass, backing vocals (2005–2011)
- Adam "Nolly" Getgood – bass (2012–2017); (Note: Getgood officially left the band in 2017; however, he remains an active collaborator, serving as the band's record producer and contributing bass tracks for their studio recordings.) guitar (2012–2017)

Former touring musicians

- John Browne – guitar (2011)
- Jeff Holcomb – bass (2011–2012)
- Mike Malyan – drums (2012)
- Boris Le Gal – drums (2012)
- JP Bouvet – drums (2017; substitute for Matt Halpern)
- David Parkes – drums (2024; substitute for Matt Halpern)
- Anup Sastry – drums (2025; substitute for Matt Halpern)

Timeline

== Discography ==
Periphery discography
- Studio albums: 8
- Extended plays: 2
- Singles: 23
- Music videos: 17

=== Studio albums ===
List of studio albums, with selected chart positions
Title	Album details	Peak chart positions							
Title	Album details	US	US Indie	AUS	AUT	FIN	GER	JPN	UK
Periphery	Released: April 20, 2010; Label: Sumerian, Roadrunner	128	18	—	—	—	—	—	—
Periphery II: This Time It's Personal	Released: July 3, 2012; Label: Sumerian, Century Media	44	6	46	—	46	—	—	115
Juggernaut: Alpha	Released: January 27, 2015; Label: Sumerian, Century Media	22	3	22	49	—	83	111	43
Juggernaut: Omega	Released: January 27, 2015; Label: Sumerian, Century Media	25	4	25	48	—	—	119	45
Periphery III: Select Difficulty	Released: July 22, 2016; Label: Sumerian, Century Media	22	2	8	42	22	39	102	57
Periphery IV: Hail Stan	Released: April 5, 2019; Label: 3DOT Recordings	64	1	21	48	40	36	—	71
Periphery V: Djent Is Not a Genre	Released: March 10, 2023; Label: 3DOT Recordings	198	29	—	—	—	38	—	—
A Pale White Dot	Released: May 15, 2026; Label: 3DOT Recordings	—	—	—	—	—	—	—	—

=== EPs ===
List of extended plays, with selected chart positions
Title	EP details	Peak chart positions			
Title	EP details	US	US Indie.	AUS	JPN
Icarus EP	Released: April 19, 2011; Label: Sumerian	—	—	—	—
Clear	Released: January 28, 2014; Label: Sumerian, Century Media	62	10	37	134
"—" denotes a recording that did not chart or was not released in that territory.

=== Singles ===
List of singles, showing year released and album name
Title	Year	Album
"Icarus Lives!"	2010	Periphery
"Jetpacks Was Yes!"	2011	Periphery
"Passenger"	2012	Periphery
"Make Total Destroy"	2012	Periphery II: This Time It's Personal
"Scarlet"	2013	Periphery II: This Time It's Personal
"Ragnarok"	2013	Periphery II: This Time It's Personal
"The Scourge"	2014	Juggernaut: Alpha
"The Bad Thing"	2014	Juggernaut: Omega
"22 Faces"	2014	Juggernaut: Alpha
"Graveless"	2014	Juggernaut: Omega
"Alpha"	2015	Juggernaut: Alpha
"The Price Is Wrong"	2016	Periphery III: Select Difficulty
"Flatline"	2016	Periphery III: Select Difficulty
"Marigold"	2016	Periphery III: Select Difficulty
"Blood Eagle"	2019	Periphery IV: Hail Stan
"Garden in the Bones"	2019	Periphery IV: Hail Stan
"Wildfire"	2023	Periphery V: Djent Is Not a Genre
"Zagreus"	2023	Periphery V: Djent Is Not a Genre
"Atropos"	2023	Periphery V: Djent Is Not a Genre
"Scarlet" (acoustic version; featuring Mike Dawes)	2024	2 Song Acoustic Single
"It's Only Smiles" (acoustic version; featuring Mike Dawes)	2024	2 Song Acoustic Single
"Mr. God"	2026	A Pale White Dot
"Everyone Dies Alone"	2026	A Pale White Dot
"Heaven on High"	2026	A Pale White Dot

=== Other appearances ===
- "One" (Metallica cover) – Appears on Homefront: Songs for the Resistance soundtrack album
- "Only If for a Night" (Florence + The Machine cover) – Appears on Florence + The Sphinx: Sumerian Ceremonials – A Tribute to Florence + The Machine

=== Music videos ===
Title	Year	Director	Album
"Icarus Lives!"	2010	Ian McFarland & Mike Pecci	Periphery
"Jetpacks Was Yes!"	2011	Eric Haviv, Richard Webb & Brandon Morris	Icarus EP
"Make Total Destroy"	2012	Wes Richardson	Periphery II: This Time It's Personal
"Scarlet"	2013	Wes Richardson	Periphery II: This Time It's Personal
"Ragnarok"	2013	Jeff Holcomb	Periphery II: This Time It's Personal
"Alpha"	2015	Wes Richardson	Juggernaut: Alpha
"The Bad Thing"	2015	Jeff Holcomb	Juggernaut: Omega
"Marigold"	2016	Wes Richardson	Periphery III: Select Difficulty
"Blood Eagle"	2019	Jeremy Danger & Travis Shinn	Periphery IV: Hail Stan
"Chvrch Bvrner"	2019	Justin Reich	Periphery IV: Hail Stan
"Wildfire"	2023	Jake Woodbridge	Periphery V: Djent Is Not a Genre
"Atropos"	2023	Rod Chong	Periphery V: Djent Is Not a Genre
"It's Only Smiles" (acoustic version)	2024	Douglas Charles	2 Song Acoustic Single
"Scarlett" (acoustic version)	2024	Douglas Charles	2 Song Acoustic Single
"Mr. God"	2026	Caleb Young	A Pale White Dot
"Everyone Dies Alone"	2026	Caleb Young	A Pale White Dot
"Heaven on High"	2026	Caleb Young	A Pale White Dot
