= Amanda Steele =

American internet personality

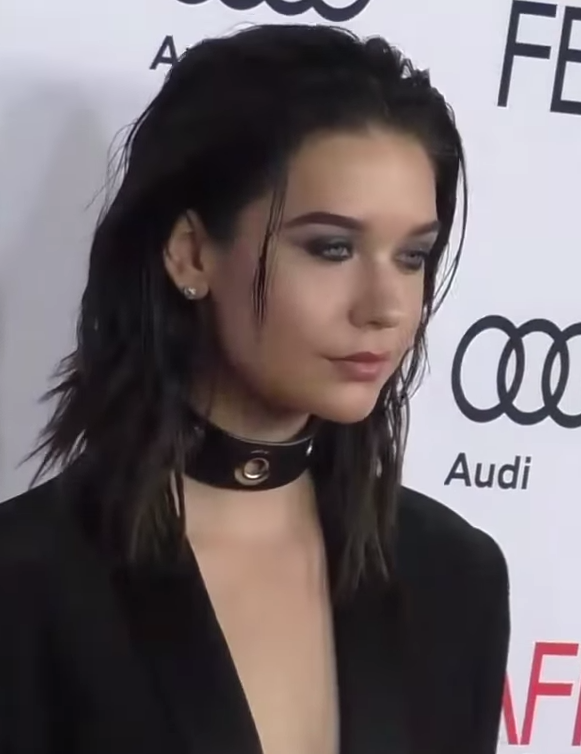
- Steele in 2016
- Born: Amanda Lynn Steele; July 26, 1999 (age 27); Huntington Beach, California, U.S.
- Occupations: YouTuber; actress; model; internet personality; blogger
- Children: 1

YouTube information
- Channel: Amanda Steele
- Years active: 2010–present
- Genres: Makeup; fashion
- Subscribers: 2.6 million
- Views: 260 million
- Last updated: October 1, 2026

Amanda Lynn Steele (born July 26, 1999) is an American video blogger, model, actress, YouTuber and internet personality. She started her YouTube channel, MakeupByMandy24, in 2010. Steele is known for her beauty and fashion related content. She signed to IMG Models in early 2016. In 2015, she started a collaboration with Quay Australia for an exclusive sunglass line. She starred in the first season of the AwesomenessTV web series, Guidance which was originally published on Go90. In 2021, she gave an interview for Vanity Teen magazine on the occasion of the premiere of her new TV show Paradise City.

== Early life ==
Amanda Lynn Steele was born on July 26, 1999, in Huntington Beach, California. Her sister, Lauren, is five years older. She grew up and attended school in Huntington Beach, but switched to homeschooling at age fourteen. Steele is also a former cheerleader and softball player.

== Personal life ==
In 2023, Steele gave birth to a daughter named Gaia.

== Filmography ==
Television roles
Year	Title	Role	Notes
2015	Guidance	Miriam Worth	Main role (season 1)
2017	The Mick	Tinkerbell	Episode: "The Haunted House"
2017	Freakish	Hailey	Recurring role (season 2)
2021–present	Paradise City	Vivian Thomas	Recurring role; TV spinoff of American Satan

== Discography ==
- Gateway (2015)
