= Do Not Go Gently =

"Do Not Go Gently" may refer to:

- "Do Not Go Gently", an episode of the series Poltergeist: The Legacy
- "Do Not Go Gently", a song by Animals as Leaders from the album Weightless

== See also ==
- Do not go gentle into that good night
