= Niki and Gabi =

American media personalities

- Born: Nicola Teresa DeMartino; Gabriella Nelida DeMartino; May 5, 1995 (age 31); Pennsylvania, U.S.
- Occupations: Internet personalities; singers
- Years active: 2010–present
- Awards: Full list
- Musical career
- Genre: Pop
- Years active: 2014–2019

YouTube information
- Channel: Niki and Gabi
- Genres: lifestyle; music; Comedy
- Subscribers: 9.26 million
- Views: 1.37 billion
- Last updated: April 23, 2026

Niki and Gabi (born May 5, 1995) is an American duo composed of twin sisters Niki and Gabi DeMartino. They rose to prominence following the creation of their YouTube channel, where they posted covers and vlogs. They partnered with Awesomeness to produce several web shows, including their self-titled reality series which has run for five seasons. They made their acting debut in the 2016 comedy-drama film Dance Camp, and their official debut single "First" was released in 2017.

In 2018, the duo won their first Streamy Award in the category of fashion. The same year, they released their debut extended play, Individual, which peaked at two Billboard charts. Their last single before starting their solo careers "Hair Tie" was released in 2019. Niki released two extended plays titled Nights Alone (2021) and Ruined My Life (2023), while Gabi released one studio album, Paintings of Me (2022) and one extended play, Gabroadway (2020).

== Life and career ==
=== 1995–2015: Early life and career beginnings ===
Nicola Teresa DeMartino and Gabriella Nelida DeMartino are twin sisters that were born on May 5, 1995. They attended Notre Dame High School in Easton, Pennsylvania, and then DeSales University in Center Valley, Pennsylvania, where Niki majored in television and film and Gabi majored in musical theatre. They dropped out of college after their junior year. Niki and Gabi have described being bullied during their school years, including being mocked for their online videos. In accounts of their experiences, they recalled feeling isolated from classmates and said that their family home was repeatedly targeted. Niki later described their commitment to creating online content despite these difficulties. They auditioned for the X Factor with their older sister Alex, performing "Telephone" by Lady Gaga and Beyoncé.

They began making videos in 2008 before starting a YouTube channel, where they'd carry the webcam around the house and film music videos. In 2010, they created the YouTube channel 00RemakeGirls and posted their first video, a remake of the Pretty Little Liars theme song. In a 2015 interview with Teen Vogue, the sisters explained that their early YouTube videos consisted of music covers and remakes. They signed with AwesomenessTV and StyleHaul in 2012. A parody of "Friday" by Rebecca Black in 2013 helped launch their YouTube career. Describing themselves as the "opposite twins", they subsequently expanded into beauty content after viewers expressed interest, makeup, hairstyles and clothing and created a new channel, Niki and Gabi Beauty, later renamed to Niki and Gabi. At the time, they described producing several videos each week while balancing their college studies.

They released their first single "We're Not Over" on June 21, 2014, which was later removed from streaming platforms along with their second single "It" that was released in June 2015. In 2015, Niki and Gabi appeared as trophy presenters (surfboard girls) at the 2015 Teen Choice Awards, in which they both consider as their "big break".

=== 2016–2019: Reality shows and Individual ===
Niki and Gabi were cast in the YouTube Red comedy-drama web film Dance Camp as the characters of Mia and Mya respectively. Gabi released her debut solo single "Ever After" in July 2016. They were one of 2016's Women's Wear Daily top 10 beauty influencers. In January 2017, Niki and Gabi released their official debut single, "First". The song was written by Gabi years before its release in a middle school perspective. Niki initially couldn't relate to the lyrics until Gabi rewrote the lyrics to a "21 year-old perspective going through a break up". In August 2017, they released a single titled "R U" which served as the lead single from their first extended play. Niki was cast as Sadie in the second season of the Hulu horror web television series Freakish (2017). Blood Queens, a horror-comedy YouTube web series created by Gabi, which was also a spin-off of Scream Queens, premiered in October 2017 and has run for four seasons from 2017 to 2020.

On June 4, 2018, Wet Seal collaborated with Niki and Gabi and launched a limited edition clothing called "Niki + Gabi for Wet Seal". The collection included accessories, tops and dresses. The same month, they released "Sleep it Off" as the second single from their EP. In July, they released their debut EP, Individual, which charted at number 14 on the Heatseekers Albums chart and number 32 on the Independent Albums chart. The EP contained two solo singles from the duo which are "Let It Roar" and "Flowers". In August, Niki and Gabi posted a video in which Niki questioned Gabi about the cosmetic procedures she had undergone and the insecurities that had influenced her decisions. Gabi discussed her dissatisfaction with aspects of her appearance, while Niki reflected on how their increasingly different looks contrasted with their earlier identity as identical twins.

In September, Gabi was featured on Mina Tobias' track "Another One" with Kai Lucas, the same month, she released a haters-diss track titled "Yacht". In October, Gabi appeared in the music video for Thank U, Next by Ariana Grande. Niki and Gabi signed to Abrams Artists Agency in 2019. In February 2019, Gabi released "Cold Room", which was written in 2016. In August 2019, Niki and Gabi released their final single, "Hair Tie". In December 2019, Niki released a Christmas single titled "Sad Holiday".

=== 2020–present: Solo projects ===
In December 2019, it has been announced that Niki and Gabi would be focusing on their solo careers, and releasing their studio albums in 2020. They also revealed plans of possibly touring together. While remaining independent, Gabi signed a management deal with Roc Nation, and her solo album, at the time called Beautiful Mess was set for release in spring. Gabi released her debut solo EP in June, titled Gabroadway ahead of her studio album. In July and October, Niki released the first singles from her solo project, "Alone in My Car" and "Bite of Me" respectively. In September, Gabi released "Champagne Dreams", which has been marketed as the lead single from her album, but was later scrapped from the track listing. Due to changes in plans and new songwriting sessions, Gabi's album has been renamed to Paintings of Me, with a new release date. The lead single "Pretty Little Mind" was released in October.

In October 2020, AwesomenessTV announced Twintervention, a six-episode reality series that would follow the sisters as they addressed personal issues and competed in challenges affecting their relationship. The show was seemingly scrapped. In November 2020, Niki and Gabi stopped uploading videos to their channel, with their last upload before the hiatus being a Black Friday shopping video. They returned to the channel in March 2021 and discussed the circumstances surrounding their break. They also launched their Snapchat reality series, Twinning Out, in May 2021. Niki gave an interview for Vanity Teen magazine in March, following the release of her single "Messy Room". It was shortly followed by "25", released in June. In August, Gabi opened for German DJ and producer Zedd at his concert in Musikfest, performing songs from her album, and she also released Paintings of Me's second single "Not Today". The same month, she partnered with Pumpkin & Spice and launched their skincare line, and Niki announced her debut extended play. Niki's debut solo EP, Nights Alone, was released in September. In October, Gabi released the third single from her album, "Immaculate", describing it as a 'cancel culture anthem'. The fourth and final single "Broken Morning" was released in March 2022. Gabi's debut studio album, Paintings of Me, was released in May.

In October 2022, Niki released "Pregame" as the lead single from her second EP Ruined My Life. The second single "Love & Misery" was released in March 2023, the third single "Amnesia" was released in April, and the final single "Sorry Than Safe" was released in May. Niki's second EP, Ruined My Life, was released in July. The same month, Gabi released a single titled "Heaven".

== Controversies ==
In September 2019, Niki and Gabi released a video on their channel titled "Going to College Dressed as Celebrities Challenge" in which American singer Normani was portrayed by a man. The video was criticized for "furthering stereotypes about black women having masculine features".

In March 2020, Niki posted a TikTok in wake of the COVID-19 pandemic which showed her with an Asian manicurist, both masked, while the song "It's Corona Time" plays over the video. The TikTok was criticized as racist and insensitive due to the implication that the manicurist had COVID-19 amid the rising xenophobia and racism experienced by Asians in the United States during the pandemic. The video was deleted and she issued an apology.

In September 2020, Gabi was criticized for a video titled "BFF Income Challenge" in which she was accused of flaunting her income. In the video, she compared her spending income with a friend revealing a "spending disparity of thousands of dollars per week". She later issued an apology.

In December 2020, Gabi made a nude video of herself at the age of 3 available for sale for $3 on the content subscription platform OnlyFans. She was accused of misleading her fans about the contents of her video which was teased with the caption "won't put my panties on", distributing child pornography and setting up unsuspecting purchasers for possession of child pornography. OnlyFans suspended her account for violating their terms of service. Gabi initially attempted to downplay the incident as "trolling", stating to Insider, "Drama channels are trying to make something out of a childhood video of me, that's hilarious", and claiming her OnlyFans "was not a sexual page", though her previous posts were sexual in nature. She later posted an apology video to her YouTube channel.

== Reality web series ==
The duo star in their own reality web series, Niki and Gabi, by AwesomenessTV. It has run for five seasons.

Season	Title	Episodes	Originally released	
Season	Title	Episodes	First released	Last released
1	Spring Break	5	May 8, 2017	June 5, 2017
2	Summer Break	7	September 2, 2017	October 14, 2017
3	Take New York	7	May 5, 2018	June 16, 2018
4	Take Miami	7	May 5, 2019	June 16, 2019
5	Take Bahamas	7	April 18, 2020	May 30, 2020

== Discography ==
=== Studio albums ===
Title	Details
Gabi DeMartino
Paintings of Me	Released: May 5, 2022; Label: Self-released; Formats: digital download, streaming

=== Extended plays ===
Title	Details	Peak chart positions	
Title	Details	US Heat.	US Indie
Niki & Gabi
Individual	Released: July 27, 2018; Label: Self-released; Formats: digital download, streaming	14	32
Niki DeMar
Nights Alone	Released: September 3, 2021; Label: Self-released; Formats: digital download, streaming	–	–
Ruined My Life	Released: July 7, 2023; Label: Self-released; Formats: digital download, streaming	–	–
Gabi DeMartino
Gabroadway	Released: June 10, 2020; Label: Self-released; Formats: digital download, streaming	–	–

=== Singles ===
Title	Year	Album
Niki & Gabi
"We're Not Over"	2014	Non-album singles
"It"	2015	Non-album singles
"First"	2017	Non-album singles
"RU"	2017	Individual
"Sleep It Off"	2018	Individual
"Let It Roar" / "Flowers" (Note: "Flowers" is sung by Gabi, while "Let It Roar" is sung by Niki)	2018	Individual
"Hair Tie"	2019	Non-album singles
"Rise and Shine"	2019	Non-album singles
Niki DeMar
"Anthem for the Judged"	2018	Non-album singles
"Sad Holiday"	2019	Non-album singles
"Alone in My Car"	2020	Nights Alone
"Bite of Me"	2020	Nights Alone
"Messy Room"	2021	Nights Alone
"25"	2021	Nights Alone
"Stuck"	2021	Nights Alone
"9 Lives"	2022	Non-album singles
"When My High Wears Off"	2022	Non-album singles
"Pregame" (solo or with 7evin7ins)	2022	Ruined My Life
"Love & Misery"	2023	Ruined My Life
"Amnesia"	2023	Ruined My Life
"Sorry Than Safe"	2023	Ruined My Life
"Vegas"	2024	Non-album singles
"Time Machine" (solo or with Gabi DeMartino)	2024	Non-album singles
"28 and Dying"	2025	Non-album singles
"Son of a B!"	2025	Non-album singles
"Late Bloomer"	2026	TBA
Gabi DeMartino
"Ever After"	2016	Non-album singles
"Yacht"	2018	Non-album singles
"Cold Room"	2019	Non-album singles
"Champagne Dreams"	2020	Non-album singles
"Pretty Little Mind"	2020	Paintings of Me
"Not Today"	2021	Paintings of Me
"Immaculate"	2021	Paintings of Me
"Barbie and Ken" (feat. Kenny Screven)	2021	Non-album single
"Broken Morning"	2022	Paintings of Me
"Heaven"	2023	Non-album single
"Time Machine" (with Niki DeMar)	2024	Non-album single

== Filmography ==
- Wheel Of Fashion (2015–2016, AwesomenssTV, YouTube)
- DIY Or DI-Don't (2015–2017, AwesomenssTV, YouTube)
- Teen Choice Awards (2015, Fox)
- YouTubers React (2016, React, YouTube)
- Top Five Live (2016, AwesomenssTV, YouTube)
- Niki and Gabi (2017–2020, AwesomenssTV, YouTube)
- Dear DeMartino (2018, AwesomenssTV, YouTube)
- Twinning Out (2021, Snapchat)

== Tours ==
- Girls Night In Tour (2016)
- The Individual Tour (2018; cancelled)

== Awards and nominations ==
Award	Year	Category	Result	Ref.
iHeartRadio Music Awards	2020	Social Star Award	Nominated	
Premios Juventud	2019	Name a Better Duo	Nominated	
Shorty Awards	2018	YouTube Ensemble	Nominated	
Streamy Awards	2016	Fashion	Nominated	
Streamy Awards	2017	Lifestyle	Nominated	
Streamy Awards	2018	Fashion	Won	
Streamy Awards	2019	Lifestyle	Nominated	
Teen Choice Awards	2016	Choice Web Star: Fashion/Beauty	Nominated	
Teen Choice Awards	2017	Choice Female Web Star	Nominated	
Teen Choice Awards	2019	Choice YouTuber	Nominated	
