= Avildsen =

Avildsen is a surname. Notable people with the surname include:

- Ash Avildsen (born 1981), American film director, screenwriter, producer, and chief executive
- John G. Avildsen (1935–2017), American film director
