= The Illusion of Democracy =

Studio album by Reflux
- Released: October 12, 2004
- Studios: Cue Recording Studios, Falls Church, Virginia; Planet Red Studios, Richmond, Virginia
- Genre: Progressive metalcore
- Length: 53:53
- Label: Prosthetic
- Producer: Andreas Magnusson

Reflux chronology
Reflux EP (2001)	The Illusion of Democracy (2004)

The Illusion of Democracy is a studio album by American progressive metalcore band Reflux. It was released on October 12, 2004, through Prosthetic Records. Live music videos were released for the songs "Above the Pyramid and the Eye" and "Single File to Bliss".

The band previously released a self-titled EP in 2001 that was re-released digitally in 2023.

Reflux began working on a second studio album with a targeted release date of spring 2006, but these plans never came to fruition.

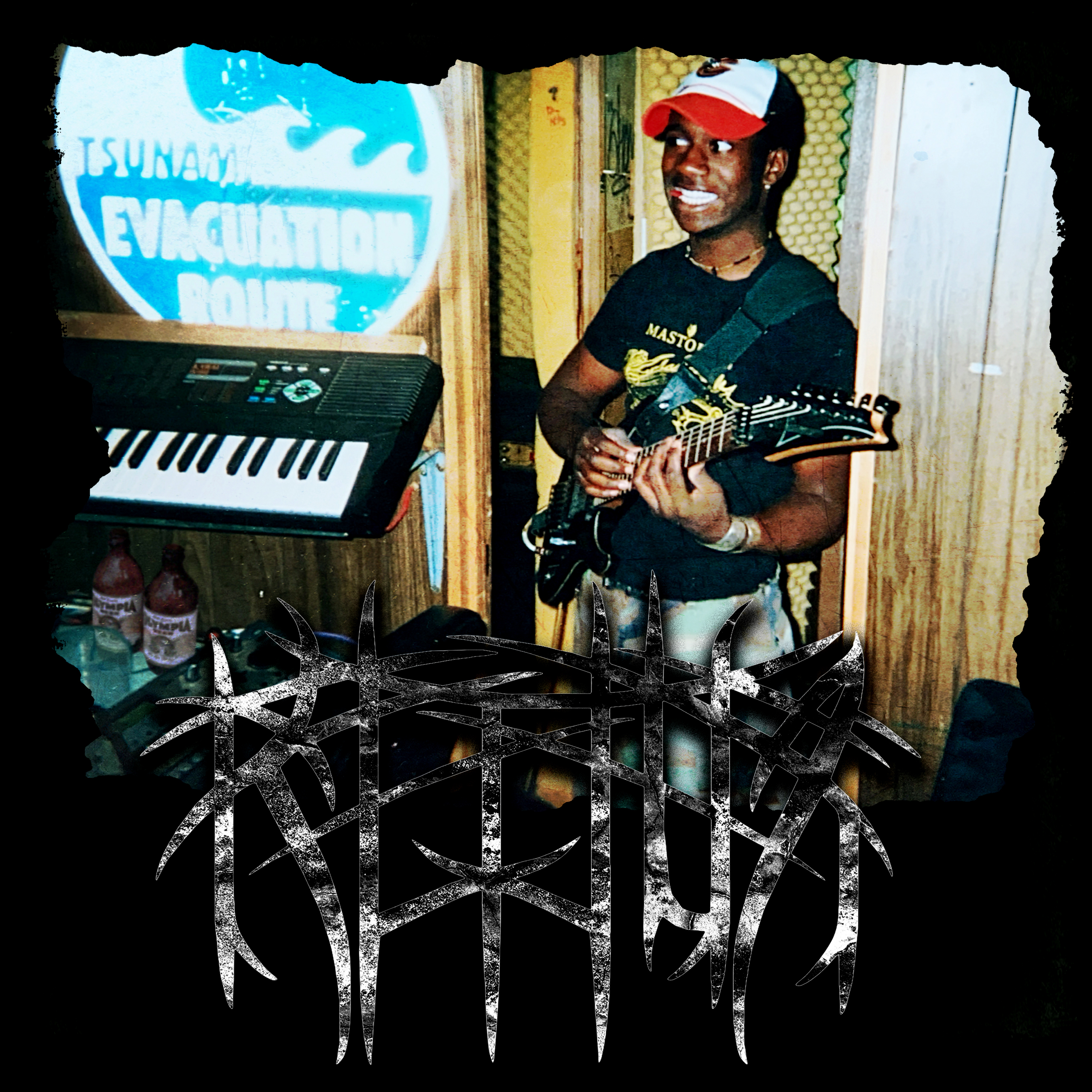
REFLUX (Self-titled EP) cover

== Background ==
Reflux was founded in 2000 by Ash Avildsen and John Mehoves; with guitarist Tosin Abasi in Washington, D.C. The band's first line-up would consist of Avildsen and Abasi along with co-vocalist John Mehoves, bassist Evan Brewer, and drummer Brandon Foltz. Dave Lozano replaced Brandon later that year. In 2001, the band would begin work on a five-track self-titled EP; Lozano would leave during the recording sessions and be replaced by Steve Clifford. Clifford finished recording the EP and stayed with the band for their first full U.S. tour. Clifford eventually joined Circa Survive. Vincent Vinh was hired to replace Clifford while Avildsen would become the band's sole vocalist after John began “losing his voice” from all the performances. “I never used any false techniques. I wish I would have to be honest but in those days there was no such thing as a vocal coach for extreme metal.” All lyrics and vocal patterns for the EP and Illusion of Democracy were written by Ash and John.

Two songs from the EP, "Above the Pyramid and the Eye" and "Single File to Bliss" would be re-recorded for The Illusion of Democracy while "Life Is More Precious Than Land" was re-worked into "An Ode to the Evolution of Human Consciousness."

1. Above the Pyramid and Eye

2. Single File to Bliss

3. Life is More Precious than Land

4. Covet the Day

5. Orea

== Legacy ==
Following the break-up of the band, guitarist Tosin Abasi was approached by Prosthetic to release a solo album, with the project becoming Animals as Leaders. Abasi was hesitant at first, but later when Reflux disbanded he agreed. Saying "I saw a solo thing as a way to express my voice."

Vocalist Ash Avildsen would go on to establish the record label Sumerian Records in 2006.

Bassist Evan Brewer would go on to join bands such as the Faceless, Fallujah, and Look What I Did.

== Reception ==
Professional ratings
Review scores
Source	Rating
Can This Even Be Called Music	95/100
Lambgoat	8/10
Sputnikmusic	5/5

In a review for CMJ New Music Report, Amy Sciarretto described the album as "an experiment that never gets boring or predictable," and noted that the band "refused to adhere to a singular style or scene." She commented: "They employ some serious guitar wizardry, precisely built walls of noise and off-the-beaten-path time signatures... but they don't skimp on the melodics, either."

Kirby Unrest of Lambgoat wrote: "A huge part of what makes Reflux not only good, but memorable, is that their immense technical talents do not undermine a dedication to cohesive and flat-out catchy numbers. They don't dumb things down, but Reflux do succeed in maintaining musical bravado, filled with awe-inspiring moments."

Writing for Can This Even Be Called Music, Dæv Tremblay remarked: "Reflux shows above all insane musicianship. Tosin and Evan tappings, fast riffs and constant changes within the songs make them interesting... Lyrics are also worth checking out... there should be more artists like this."

== Track listing ==
All lyrics are written by Ash Avildsen; all music is composed by Reflux.

No.	Title	Length
1.	"Above the Pyramid and the Eye"	4:15
2.	"Thoughts Dictate Reality"	7:38
3.	"An Ode to the Evolution of Human Consciousness"	3:59
4.	"The Sudden Realization..."	6:33
5.	"...Of What You Were Missing"	4:02
6.	"-=[*]=-" (Instrumental)	4:17
7.	"Single File to Bliss"	5:39
8.	"There's No Sunlight In My Cubicle"	4:39
9.	"The Keats Persona" (Instrumental)	5:35
10.	"1984-2004" (Instrumental)	1:14
11.	"Modern Day Babylon"	6:02

== Personnel ==
Credits adapted from AllMusic:

Reflux

- John Mehoves - Lyrics and Vocal arrangements
- Ash Avildsen – vocals
- Tosin Abasi – guitar
- Evan Brewer – bass, backing vocals on tracks 1 and 7
- Vincent Vinh – drums

Additional musicians

- Chris Dowhan – keyboards, piano

Production

- Andreas Magnusson – production, mixing, guitar and bass tracking
- Brad Vance – mastering
- Stephen Juliano – design, artwork, layout
