= Matt Garstka =

American drummer

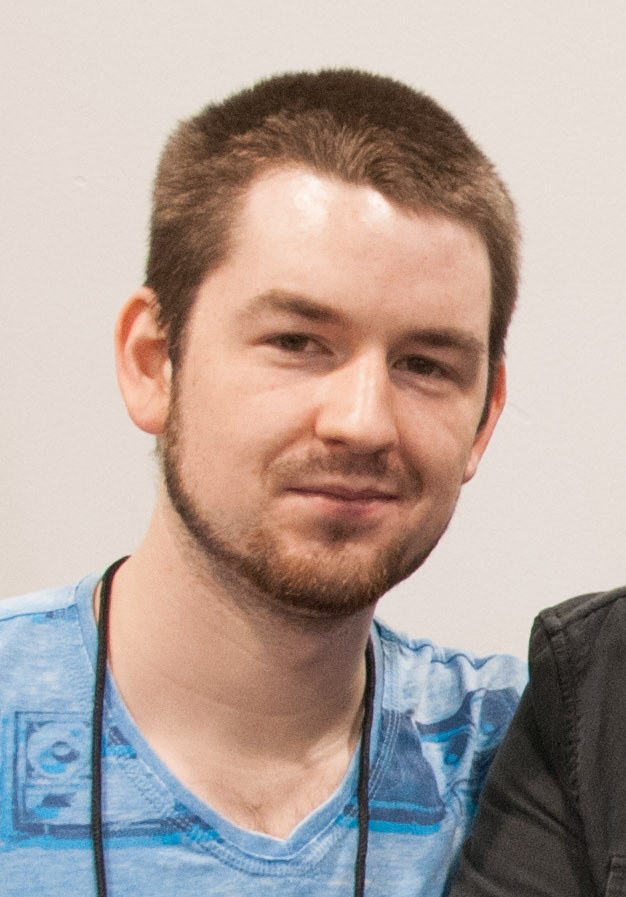
- Garstka at NAMM 2014

Background information
- Born: Matthew Wolfgang Garstka; April 27, 1989 (age 37)
- Origin: Hopewell, Virginia, U.S.
- Genres: Progressive metal; djent; jazz fusion
- Occupation: Drummer
- Member of: Animals as Leaders
- Website: mattgarstka.com

Matthew Wolfgang Garstka (born April 27, 1989) is an American drummer, best known for his work with instrumental progressive metal band Animals as Leaders.

== Biography ==
Garstka, son of professional guitar player Greg Garstka, was born in Hopewell, Virginia, and raised in Westfield, Massachusetts. He started playing drums at the age of 8. At the age of 12 he started gigging with his father, playing rock, blues and reggae music. At 14 Garstka met Jo Sallins, who introduced him to fusion, funk, Latin and jazz drumming. At the age of 14 Matt appeared in Sallins DVD Mr. Cool. In 2006 he released an EP with punk band Backstab and in 2007 released his first solo album Heavy Volume, featuring Joel Stroetzel from Killswitch Engage, Chis Regan from FNB and Jo Sallins. After finishing high school, Garstka attended Berklee College of Music. In the same year he was featured in GospelChops.com DVD Shed Sessionz Vol. 3. Soon after moving to Los Angeles Garstka met Tosin Abasi and joined his band Animals as Leaders following the departure of Navene Koperweis. In 2012 Garstka programmed drums for Mestis debut EP Basal Ganglia. In March 2015 Garstka was featured as Modern Drummer magazine cover artist. During his career Garstka has performed with artists such as Rohn Lawrence, David Stolz, Tigran Hamasyan, Tony Smith, Doug Johns, Toni Blackman, Derek Jordon and Evan Marien.

In 2021, he was voted the "Best Progressive Drummer" by MusicRadar.

== Discography ==
=== Animals as Leaders ===
- The Joy of Motion (2014)
- Animals as Leaders Encore Edition (2015)
- The Madness of Many (2016)
- Parrhesia (2022)

=== Victoria ===
- Modern Value (2018)
- Kepler (2019)
- Iris (2019)
- Perennial (2020)
- Chronostasis (2024)
- Axioma (2024)
- Possibilia (2024)

=== Louis De Mieulle ===
- Defense Mechanisms (2014)
- Dual (2017)

=== Casimir Liberski ===
- Cosmic Liberty (2019)

=== Tigran Hamasyan ===
- The Bird of a Thousand Voices (2024)
- Manifeste (2026)
