= Brain Dance =

Brain Dance may refer to:

- "Brain Dance", a song by Annihilator from the album Set the World on Fire, 1993
- "The Brain Dance", a song by Animals as Leaders from the album The Madness of Many, 2016
- Braindance, an alternative name for intelligent dance music
