= American Satan (franchise) =

Film franchise

- Official franchise logo
- Based on: Characters created by Ash Avildsen & Matty Beckerman
- Distributed by: Miramax; Amazon Prime Video
- Country: United States
- Language: English
- Box office: $237,708 (1 films)

The American Satan franchise consists of American supernatural-thrillers centered around a hard rock band; including one limited theatrical film, a sequel television series, and studio albums released by the faux band from the franchise. The overall plot centers around a fictional band named The Relentless, who make a contract with a nefarious supernatural force in attempts to reach their dreams of fame. Created by Ash Avildsen, the events are based on supposed real-life experiences he's had in the music industry.

The 2017 film received positive critical reception upon its release. Despite its mild box office performance through its limited theatrical run, Avildsen hopes the film will eventually be called a cult classic. The sequel television series was similarly well received by critics and its viewers; with praise directed at its expansion with individual character development.

== Development ==
The franchise is based on true experiences that franchise creator Ash Avildsen experienced through his estranged relationship with his famous father John G. Avildsen, and his career as founder of Sumerian Records in the music industry. While the filmmaker has incorporated supernatural aspects to the story, he states that he believes similar occurrences in his life have "guided and misguided" his career as a record producer. Avildsen initially wrote the premise for a scripted television series, but with similar music centered shows debuting he restructured the story to fit a feature film. Once the movie was released, he continued work on the television series which was released as a sequel continuation. Developed under the working title of "Paint It Black" from The Rolling Stones song of the same name, his friend Tom Zutaut convinced him to name the series after the Guns N' Roses song instead.

During development of American Satan, contractual record label complications arose which made it so that Biersack could not perform lead vocals on any of the tracks being written for the fictional band, The Relentless. With intent for the band to be a part of the metalcore genre, similar in style to Avenged Sevenfold or Black Veil Brides, the lead singer of Palaye Royale named Remington Leith, was brought in to perform vocals on the songs instead.

A television series continuing the story of the fictional band Paradise City was released in 2021; a second season was planned but has not released as of 2025. In 2025 Avildsen announced that a sequel film was in development, as well as a comic book series for The Relentless, which would be released through Sumerian Comics.

== Films ==
Film	U.S. release date	Director	Screenwriters	Producers
American Satan	October 13, 2017	Ash Avildsen	Ash Avildsen & Matty Beckerman	Ash Avildsen, Matty Beckerman, Sean E. Demott, Andy Gould, Jeff Rice, Isen Robbins and Aimee Schoof
American Satan II: The Beast Goes On	TBA	Ash Avildsen	TBA	TBA

=== American Satan (2017) ===
An emerging rock band made of members from the United States and England named The Relentless, drop out of the college education and move to California to follow their dreams in achieving stardom. Together they live in a van, while they travel to perform for their fans. When their passion exceeds the required means to survive, the band turns to a mysterious stranger named Mr. Capricorn, who claims to be a record producer. Their new manager claims to see their true potential, with promises to help them realize their goals, their journey in creating history through their music takes a dark turn. They soon discover that their music and controversy begins to influence society beyond anything natural in the history of music. As they begin to question whether Mr. Capricorn is something supernatural; increasingly more sinister than when they first met him, they decide to take their destiny back in their own hands before its too late, and before he realizes they are seeking to right their wrongs.

=== American Satan II: The Beast Goes On (TBA) ===
In December 2024, a sequel was announced to be in development, titled American Satan II: The Beast Goes On. Avildsen stated that while he had initially worked on continuing the franchise through a second season of Paradise City, the production delays including the COVID-19 pandemic influence on the film industry, caused the project to repeatedly be delayed. The filmmaker stated that he determined to develop a feature film instead, as he wanted to see the fictional band's story continue sooner than the amount of time that a series takes to produce, his desires to more controversial topics within a feature film, and his desires to contribute to independent film in a theatrical setting. Avildsen stated that production would be completed during the first half of 2025, and that the movie will resolve the story left open during the end of the first season.

== Television ==
Series	Season	Episodes	Originally released	Network	Showrunner	Status
Paradise City	1	8	March 25, 2021	NBC	Ash Avildsen	Released

=== Paradise City (2021) ===
Developed as a spin-off/continuation of the feature film, Paradise City details the continued adventures of the fictional band The Relentless. The plot follows the band as they continue to engage in controversial activities, and continue their ventures connected to occult rituals to maintain their fame. Through their stardom, each member is faced with events that cause friction within their ranks. As a new manager approaches them named Ms. Capricorn, they begin to question her true nature due to recurring situations that arise from their previous management. Through their struggles to maintain their familial relationship, the chaos of the industry causes some haunting events from their past to resurface. When a young teenager who idolizes them arrives to follow in their footsteps, the band's future intertwines with his hopes and dreams within the music business. As they discover their influence over him and the younger generation, they begin to realize the changes that they can make within society.

In October 2021, following the positive reception, the series was renewed for a second season. Principal photography commenced in early 2022. Following various production delays however, a second season was abandoned in favor of a second movie instead.

=== Animation ===
In October 2017, Ash Avildsen announced plans to expand the franchise into an animated television show. The filmmaker stated that he hopes to create a fictional universe of interconnected media, centered around various fictional bands and rock stars.

== Main cast and characters ==
List indicator

This section includes characters who will appear or have appeared in the franchise in main roles.

- An empty grey cell indicates the character was not in the film, or that the character's official presence has not yet been confirmed.

Character	Film	Television
Character	American Satan	Paradise City
Johnny Faust	Andy Biersack Remington Leith (Note: Leith provides the singing vocals for the character, despite Biersack's musical career.)	Andy Biersack Remington Leith
Leo Donovan	Ben Bruce	Ben Bruce
Vic Lakota	Booboo Stewart Lee McKinney (Note: McKinney performs the co-lead guitar for the character.)	Booboo Stewart Lee McKinney
Lily Mayflower	Jesse Sullivan	Bella Thorne
Dylan James	Sebastian Gregory	James Cassells
Satan / the Devil Mr. Capricorn / Ms. Capricorn	Malcolm McDowell	Brooke Lyons
Gabriel the Archangel	Bill Duke	Marcus "Hopsin" Hopson
Simon Ostergaard		Cameron Boyce
Simon Ostergaard		TBA
Oliver Ostergaard		Ryan Hurst
Natalie Ostergaard		Perrey Reeves
Elias Collins	Mark Boone Junior	Mark Boone Junior

== Additional crew and production details ==
Title	Crew/Detail					
Title	Composer(s)	Cinematographer	Editor(s)	Production companies	Distributing company	Running time
American Satan	Jonathan Davis & Nicholas O'Toole	Andrew Strahorn	Bryan Yokomi	Sumerian Films, Jeff Rice Films, Intrinsic Value Films, Executive Style Entertainment	Miramax	112 minutes
Paradise City	Isabella Summers	Michael Lloyd	Brandon Amelotte, Andrew Brueck, and Joel Salazar	Sumerian Films, Hit Parader Productions, Amazon Prime Originals	Amazon Prime Video	240 minutes (30–40 min episodes)

== Fictional band ==
Official band logo

The Relentless

- Johnny Faust – lead vocals
- Vic Lakota – co-lead and rhythm guitars
- Leo Donovan – co-lead and rhythm guitars
- Lily Mayflower – bass guitar
- Dylan James –drums

Band member	Actor	Performing musician	Instrument
Johnny Faust	Andy Biersack	Remington Leith	lead vocals
Leo Donovan	Ben Bruce		co-lead and rhythm guitars
Vic Lakota	Booboo Stewart	Lee McKinney	co-lead and rhythm guitars
Lily Mayflower	Jesse Sullivan (Note: Sullivan portrays the character in American Satan, in addition to serving as the performing musician.) Bella Thorne (Note: Thorne portrays the character in Paradise City, while Jesse Sullivan served as the performing musician.)	Jesse Sullivan	bass guitar
Dylan James	Sebastian Gregory (Note: Gregory portrays the character in American Satan, in addition to serving as the performing musician.) James Cassells (Note: Cassells portrays the character in Paradise City, in addition to serving as the performing musician.)		drums

=== Albums ===
List of studio albums
Title	Details
American Satan	Released: July 18, 2018; Label: Sumerian Records; Formats: CD, LP, digital download
Cruel Games	Released: December 14, 2021; Label: Sumerian Records; Formats: CD, LP, digital download

== Soundtrack ==
Released in 2017 by Sumerian Records, the American Satan film score was composed by Jonathan Davis from KoЯn, in collaboration with Nicholas O'Toole. For the Paradise City, Isabella Summers from Florence + the Machine compose soundtrack score. In 2020, Sumerian Records released the first part of the soundtrack for the television series with the title of Paradise City – Season One Soundtrack (Vol. 1).

== Reception ==
=== Box office and financial performance ===
Title	Box office gross			Box office ranking		Video sales gross	Worldwide Total income	Ref.
Title	North America	Other territories	Worldwide	All time North America	All time worldwide	North America	Worldwide Total income	Ref.
American Satan	$237,708	—N/a	$237,708	#11,097	#20,069	Information not publicly available	>$237,708	

=== Critical and public response ===
Film	Rotten Tomatoes	Metacritic
American Satan	78% (9 reviews)	
Paradise City		—N/a
