= The Madness of Many =

Studio album by Animals as Leaders
- Released: November 11, 2016
- Recorded: 2016
- Genres: Progressive metal; jazz metal; djent; instrumental rock
- Length: 52:56
- Label: Sumerian

Animals as Leaders chronology
The Joy of Motion (2014)	The Madness of Many (2016)	Parrhesia (2022)

The Madness of Many is the fourth studio album by American instrumental progressive metal band Animals as Leaders. It was released on November 11, 2016.

Professional ratings
Aggregate scores
Source	Rating
Metacritic	72/100
Review scores
Source	Rating
Pitchfork	6.4/10

== Track listing ==
All music is composed by Animals as Leaders.

No.	Title	Length
1.	"Arithmophobia"	6:01
2.	"Ectogenesis"	4:56
3.	"Cognitive Contortions"	4:29
4.	"Inner Assassins"	5:30
5.	"Private Visions of the World"	4:57
6.	"Backpfeifengesicht"	4:27
7.	"Transcentience"	5:32
8.	"The Glass Bridge"	5:04
9.	"The Brain Dance"	7:01
10.	"Apeirophobia"	4:59
Total length:		52:56

== Personnel ==
Animals as Leaders

- Tosin Abasi – lead guitar
- Javier Reyes – rhythm guitar, bass
- Matt Garstka – drums

Guest musicians

- Travis "Machinedrum" Stewart – electronics/synths ("Inner Assassins")

Production

- Animals as Leaders – production
- Francesco Camelli – drum recording
- Javier Reyes – mixing
- Ermin Hamidovic – mastering
- Ash Avildsen & Nick Walters – A&R
- Dario Veruari – album artwork
- Daniel McBride – layout

== Charts ==
Chart (2016)	Peak position
New Zealand Heatseekers Albums (RMNZ)	10
US Billboard 200	56
