= Guidance (web series) =

American web series

- Genre: Teen drama
- Directed by: Anna Mastro; Julian Higgins; Maggie Kiley
- Country of origin: United States
- Original language: English
- No. of seasons: 3
- No. of episodes: 27

Production
- Executive producer: Michelle Trachtenberg
- Running time: 21–23 minutes
- Production company: AwesomenessTV

Original release
- Network: go90
- Release: October 18, 2015 – August 29, 2017

Guidance is an American teen drama anthology web series. The series was produced by AwesomenessTV for release on the go90 streaming service. The first season of Guidance was released on October 18, 2015, with the second season released between November 14 to December 9, 2016, and the third and final season released on August 29, 2017.

== Overview ==
The first season was released on October 18, 2015 and follows Miriam (Amanda Steele) attending sessions with her guidance counselor Anna (Michelle Trachtenberg) following the public release of scandalous photos of Miriam circulating around the school. Anna then investigates who released the photos and why.

The series was renewed for a second season which was released on November 14, 2016. The second season featured an entirely new cast and storyline – Hilary (Arden Rose), an overachiever at Capital High who discovers that her perfect GPA is suffering, causing her to accuse the school's most beloved teacher of favoritism. The new guidance counselor (Erica Dasher) launches an investigation.

The series was renewed for a third season which was released on August 28, 2017. Season 3, once again, features a new cast. The third season follows Faith (Dianne Doan), who is in mourning after the death for twin sister, Grace (also played by Doan) due to a fatal hit-and-run. Meanwhile Katina (Monique Coleman), the school's guidance counselor, "attempts to facilitate a school-wide mourning session" while investigating the circumstances of Grace's death and the tarnishing of her memory.

== Cast ==
=== Season 1 ===
- Michelle Trachtenberg as Anna
- Amanda Steele as Miriam
- Taylor John Smith as Chip
- Graham Phillips as Roger
- Brooke Markham as Bridget
- Casimere Jollette as Linz
- Saidah Arrika Ekulona as Principal Walsh
- Matt Cohen as Jim

=== Season 2 ===
- Erica Dasher as Alana Maynor
- Arden Rose as Hilary Lehane
- Chachi Gonzales as Brianna Wheeler
- David Gridley as Tyler James
- Miss Benny as Smiley
- Leah Lewis as Liddy
- Diamond White as Layla
- Keean Johnson as Ozo
- Ryan Rottman as Kevin Ridley
- Eric Allan Kramer as Principal John Decost

=== Season 3 ===
- Monique Coleman as Katina Howard
- Dianne Doan as Faith and Grace Park-Jensen
- Meg DeAngelis as Laurin Sweeney
- Amymarie Gaertner as Audrey March
- Megan Suri as Navi Gupta
- Crawford Collins as Scott Williams
- Marlon Young as Principal Sullivan

== Episodes ==
Season	Episodes	Originally released	
Season	Episodes	First released	Last released
1	6	October 18, 2015	
2	11	November 14, 2016	December 9, 2016
3	10	August 29, 2017	

=== Season 1 (2015) ===
No. overall	No. in season	Title	Directed by	Written by	Original release date
1	1	"The Pictures"	Anna Mastro	Bekah Brunstetter	October 18, 2015
2	2	"The Secrets"	Anna Mastro	Bekah Brunstetter	October 18, 2015
3	3	"The Suspects"	Anna Mastro	Allison Schroeder	October 18, 2015
4	4	"The Power of Persuasion"	Anna Mastro	Shaina Fewell	October 18, 2015
5	5	"The Rumors"	Anna Mastro	Daria Polatin	October 18, 2015
6	6	"The Guilty One"	Anna Mastro	Daria Polatin	October 18, 2015

=== Season 2 (2016) ===
No. overall	No. in season	Title	Directed by	Written by	Original release date
7	1	"B+"	Julian Higgins	SJ Hodges	November 14, 2016
8	2	"A.B.A."	Maggie Kiley	SJ Hodges	November 15, 2016
9	3	"Under the Influencers"	Maggie Kiley	Allen Clary	November 16, 2016
10	4	"Together Forever"	Julian Higgins	Gina Gold	November 21, 2016
11	5	"Hilary and the Horrible, Terrible, No Good, Very Bad Day"	Julian Higgins	Eric Reyes Loo	November 24, 2016
12	6	"Eighteen Candles"	Maggie Kiley	Liz Hannah	November 29, 2016
13	7	"En Rogue"	Maggie Kiley	Avery Clary	November 30, 2016
14	8	"Rumor or Trumor"	Julian Higgins	Gina Gold	December 1, 2016
15	9	"Bam Bam"	Julian Higgins	SJ Hodges	December 5, 2016
16	10	"Capitol Catch-Up, Part 1"	Julian Higgins	Eric Reyes Loo	December 7, 2016
17	11	"Capitol Catch-Up, Part 2"	Julian Higgins	Eric Reyes Loo	December 9, 2016

=== Season 3 (2017) ===
No. overall	No. in season	Title	Directed by	Written by	Original release date
18	1	"Dead Slut"	Julian Higgins	SJ Hodges	August 29, 2017
19	2	"Dead Ball"	Julian Higgins	Eric Reyes Loo	August 29, 2017
20	3	"Dead Drunk"	Jordan Bahat	Dime Davis	August 29, 2017
21	4	"Dead Man Walking"	Jordan Bahat	Gina Gold	August 29, 2017
22	5	"Dead Eyes"	Tessa Blake	Allen Clary	August 29, 2017
23	6	"Dead Ringer"	Tessa Blake	Eric Reyes Loo	August 29, 2017
24	7	"Playing Dead"	Rob Spera	Dime Davis	August 29, 2017
25	8	"Dead Wrong / Dead Right"	Rob Spera	Gina Gold	August 29, 2017
26	9	"Dead of Night"	Julian Higgins	Alexis Roblan	August 29, 2017
27	10	"Dead End"	Julian Higgins	SJ Hodges	August 29, 2017
