= Paintings of Me =

2022 studio album by Gabi DeMartino

Studio album by Gabi DeMartino
- Released: 6 May 2022
- Recorded: 2019–2021
- Genres: Orchestral pop; dance pop; electropop
- Length: 45:43
- Label: Self-released
- Producers: LYRE; Marie Monti; Jacob Chabon

Gabi DeMartino chronology
Gabroadway (2020)	Paintings of Me (2022)

Singles from Paintings of Me
- 1. "Pretty Little Mind" Released: October 9, 2020; 2. "Not Today" Released: August 13, 2021; 3. "Immaculate" Released: October 27, 2021; 4. "Broken Morning" Released: March 25, 2022

Paintings of Me is the debut studio album by American singer and media personality Gabi DeMartino. It was independently released on May 6, 2022. The project was originally titled Beautiful Mess, with DeMartino's single "Champagne Dreams" intended as its lead single. It was later retitled Paintings of Me with "Pretty Little Mind" serving as its official lead single. The album's release has been frequently delayed, with intended releases in 2020 and 2021.

== Background and development ==
In December 2019, Niki and Gabi announced a hiatus to focus on their solo projects. Later, DeMartino revealed that she had signed with Roc Nation for music management and that she was working on her first album. On September 1, 2020, DeMartino released her single "Champagne Dreams", which was originally promoted as the lead single of the album. The song was later cut from the final track listing due to DeMartino’s decision to re-work on the album.

Paintings of Me was originally titled Beautiful Mess, and was initially created as a Niki and Gabi album, but Niki ultimately decided not to participate, as the album did not align with her style. One of the intended lead singles by the duo, "Hair Tie", was released in August 2019 as part of the scrapped project.

DeMartino referred to the album's creation as "medicine" during a difficult year in her life. She stated that the album served as the "long 'let's be honest' discussion" that she often found easier to express through lyrics and melody rather than her usual long-form YouTube content. In June 2023, DeMartino revealed that Paintings of Me was accidental and was formed due to her constantly writing new material.

== Promotion ==
To promote the album, DeMartino performed at Musikfest a couple of times. In 2020, she performed "Champagne Dreams" and "Not Today" virtually due to the COVID-19 pandemic. The following year, she opened for German musician Zedd at the same festival and performed several songs from her album. DeMartino also headlined her own show in London, performing at the O2 Academy Islington to further promote the album.

In May 2025, DeMartino released the official music video for "Paintings of Me", the title track of the album.

== Singles ==
The lead single "Pretty Little Mind" was released on October 9, 2020. It's an electro-pop song that features elements of EDM. "Not Today" was released on August 13, 2021, the same day she performed at Musikfest.

Later on October 27, DeMartino released the third single "Immaculate" in which she described as a cancel culture anthem. The song features lush instrumentation with a contemporary pop vibration, described by Bong Mines Entertainment as "relatable narrative, ear-pleasing vocals, and tuneful melodies". In the music video for "Immaculate", DeMartino is being haunted by ghosts of her past mistakes where she also confronts her personal challenges dealing with cancel culture and the toxicity of the internet. It was shot at the Chris Mark Castle, symbolizing the place "[she's] gotten lost in before (the internet and [her] social media)". Her fans were also featured in the music video, playing the "rumors" and the "haters". The song was written by DeMartino on her Notes app in the pool during a stressful day, originally as "Perfection".

The fourth and final single "Broken Morning", a pop-ballad song, was released March 25, 2022. The song represents DeMartino's emotional rollercoaster mid-breakdown.

== Track listing ==
All tracks are written by Gabriella DeMartino, except where noted.

No.	Title	Writer(s)	Producer(s)	Length
1.	"Welcome To My Life"			5:05
2.	"Diamonds"			3:02
3.	"Elevators"			4:06
4.	"It's Getting Messy (Interlude)"			3:05
5.	"Immaculate"			4:00
6.	"Broken Morning"			2:55
7.	"Beautiful Mess"			3:16
8.	"Wish" (feat. Mina Tobias)			3:53
9.	"Not Today"			3:05
10.	"Paintings of Me"			2:06
11.	"2:22 In Paris"			0:25
12.	"Romeo"			4:12
13.	"Pretty Little Mind"			2:59
14.	"Different"	Norman Gimbel; Charles Ira Fox	Marie Monti; Jacob Chabon	2:51
15.	"Pretty Little Outro"			0:37
Total length:				45:43
