= Parrhesia (album) =

Studio album by Animals as Leaders
- Released: March 25, 2022
- Recorded: 2021
- Genre: Progressive metal; djent; avant-garde metal; instrumental rock
- Length: 36:56
- Label: Sumerian
- Producer: Misha Mansoor

Animals as Leaders chronology
The Madness of Many (2016)	Parrhesia (2022)

Singles from Parrhesia
- 1. "Monomyth" Released: September 2, 2021; 2. "The Problem of Other Minds" Released: November 18, 2021; 3. "Gordian Naught" Released: February 17, 2022

Parrhesia is the fifth studio album by American instrumental progressive metal band Animals as Leaders. It was released on March 25, 2022, by Sumerian Records. It was ranked as the 14th best guitar album of 2022 by Guitar World readers.

Professional ratings
Review scores
Source	Rating
Guitar.com	8/10
Imperiumi	7.5/10
Kerrang!	4/5
Metal Hammer	4/5 stars
Pitchfork	7.3/10

== Track listing ==
All tracks written by Animals as Leaders.

No.	Title	Length
1.	"Conflict Cartography"	5:00
2.	"Monomyth"	3:26
3.	"Red Miso"	4:31
4.	"Gestaltzerfall"	4:46
5.	"Asahi"	1:51
6.	"The Problem of Other Minds"	2:32
7.	"Thoughts and Prayers"	5:48
8.	"Micro-Aggressions"	4:10
9.	"Gordian Naught"	4:48
Total length:		36:56

== Personnel ==
Animals as Leaders

- Tosin Abasi – lead guitar
- Javier Reyes – rhythm guitar
- Matt Garstka – drums

Other Personnel

- Misha Mansoor – production, synth arrangement, bass
- Francesco Camelli – drum recording
- Nick Morzov – mixing
- Javier Reyes – mixing
- Jens Bogren – mastering
