= Fred (franchise) =

Nickelodeon media franchise based on web series

FЯED
- Created by: Lucas Cruikshank; Brian Robbins
- Original work: Fred: The Movie (2010)
- Owners: Lionsgate Films (film rights); Nickelodeon (Skydance)
- Years: 2010–2012
- Based on: FЯED by Lucas Cruikshank

Films and television
- Television series: Fred: The Show (2012)
- Television films: Fred: The Movie (2010); Fred 2: Night of the Living Fred (2011); Fred 3: Camp Fred (2012)

Fred (often stylized as FЯED) is a media franchise based on the web series of the same name created by Lucas Cruikshank and Brian Robbins. The films are produced by Derf Films, Varsity Pictures, The Collective and Nickelodeon. while they have been distributed by Lionsgate Films.

Similar to the web series, the franchise follows high-pitched, loud mouthed adolescent Fred Figglehorn and the misadventures he goes on in the real world. When the first film was in production, various changes were made to the original series, most notably Fred's age being changed from a 6-year-old child to a teenager and his attire going from a blue or red shirt with shorts to a gray and yellow striped t-shirt with jeans and suspenders.

== Films ==
=== Fred: The Movie (2010) ===
Fred: The Movie aired on Nickelodeon on September 18, 2010. The film was directed by Clay Weiner and starred Lucas Cruikshank as Fred Figglehorn, Jennette McCurdy as Bertha, Pixie Lott as Judy, John Cena as Fred's imaginary dad, and Jake Weary as Kevin. In this film, Fred dreams of singing a duet with the girl of his dream, Judy. But when he discovers she has moved, he embarks on an epic journey across the neighborhood to her new house. It was released on DVD on October 4, 2010. It was also released as a triple pack box set along with Fred 2: Night of the living Fred and Fred 3: Camp Fred.

It is the only film in the series to have received a theatrical release, having a limited run in the United Kingdom and Ireland. It grossed $1,309,580 on its $4 million budget.

=== Fred 2: Night of the Living Fred (2011) ===
Fred 2: Night of the Living Fred aired on Nickelodeon on October 22, 2011. The film was directed by John Fortenberry. Jennette McCurdy did not reprise her role as Bertha due to her commitments to iCarly, and was replaced by Daniella Monet, Pixie Lott did not return to play Judy due to her management now allowing her to appear in further films. New cast members include Seth Morris as Mr. Devlin, Carlos Knight as Diesel, and Ariel Winter as Talia. In this film, Fred's music teacher Mrs. Felson mysteriously disappears and Fred believes that the new music teacher, Mr. Devlin, killed her and thinks he is a vampire. So he goes on a wildly comic quest to expose Mr. Devlin's true identity. It was released on DVD on February 6, 2012.

=== Fred 3: Camp Fred (2012) ===
Fred 3: Camp Fred aired on Nickelodeon on July 28, 2012. The film was directed by Jonathan Judge. Lucas Cruikshank, Daniella Monet, Jake Weary, John Cena, Siobhan Fallon Hogan, and Carlos Knight reprise their roles from the second film. New cast members include Tom Arnold as Floyd Spunkmeyer, Adam Herschman as Murray, and Joey Bragg as Magoo. In this film, Fred is out of school for the summer and hopes of going to Camp Superior. But his mother sends him to Camp Iwannapeepee instead. He learns that Camp Iwannapeepee and Camp Superior have been competing in the Summer Camp Games for 69 years and that Superior has always won. And when Fred sees that his arch-rival Kevin is on the Camp Superior team, he and Camp Iwannapeepee must band together so they can finally win. This was the last installment in the franchise following the television series.

== Cast and crew ==
=== Cast ===
List indicators
- A dark gray cell indicates the character was not featured in the film.
- An ^{A} indicates an appearance through previously recorded material.
- An ^{O} actor or actress portrayed an older version of their character.
- A ^{U} actor or actress was left uncredited for their role.
- A ^{Y} indicates an actor or actress portrayed a younger version of their character.

| Characters | Films | | | Television series |
| Characters | Fred: The Movie | Fred 2: Night of the Living Fred | Fred 3: Camp Fred | Fred: The Show |
|---|---|---|---|---|
| Fred Figglehorn | Lucas Cruikshank | Lucas Cruikshank | Lucas Cruikshank | Lucas Cruikshank |
| Fred Figglehorn | Lucas Cruikshank | Jack Coughlan^{Y} | Lucas Cruikshank | Lucas Cruikshank |
| Fred Figglehorn | Jack Coughlan^{Y} | Garrett Hammond (Note: Hammond stood in as a double for Fred Figglehorn in a sequence in which the character had a muscular body.) | Lucas Cruikshank | Lucas Cruikshank |
| Kevin Lebow | Jake Weary | Jake Weary | Jake Weary | Jake Weary |
| Kevin Lebow | Jake Weary | Jay Jay Warren^{Y} | Jake Weary | Jake Weary |
| Bertha | Jennette McCurdy | Daniella Monet | Daniella Monet | Daniella Monet |
| Hilda Figglehorn | Siobhan Fallon Hogan | Siobhan Fallon Hogan | Siobhan Fallon Hogan | Siobhan Fallon Hogan |
| Dad Figglehorn | John Cena | John Cena | John Cena | John Cena |
| Judy | Pixie Lott | Pixie Lott^{A} | | |
| Derf | Lucas Cruikshank | Lucas Cruikshank | | Lucas Cruikshank |
| Janet Lebow | Stephanie Courtney | Stephanie Courtney | | Stephanie Courtney |
| Dam Security Guard | Chris Wylde | Chris Wylde | | |
| #6 Bus Driver | Robert Noble | | | |
| Little Evan Weiss | Mak Kriksciun | | | |
| Little Evan Weiss | Kevin Olson^{O} | | | |
| Mr. Jake Devlin | | Seth Morris | | |
| Talia | | Ariel Winter | | |
| Talia | | Olivia Gonzales^{Y}^{U} | | |
| Diesel | | Carlos Knight | Carlos Knight | Carlos Knight |
| Mrs. Felson | | Irene Rossen | | |
| William "Magoo" | | | Joey Bragg | |
| Chatter | | | Matthew Scott Miller | |
| Spoon | | | Leah Lewis | |
| Dig | | | Adrian Kali Turner | |
| Floyd Spunkmeyer | | | Tom Arnold | |
| Murray | | | Adam Herschman | |
| Scary Gary | | | Tracey Walter | |
| Nurse Oksana | | | Madison Riley | |
| Ivan | | | Steve Hytner | |
| Randall "Randy" | | | Jason McNichols | |
| Hugh Thompson | | | Charlie Carver | |
| Starr | | | | Rachel Crow |
| Holly | | | | Gracie Dzienny |
| Mrs. Habersteen | | | | Pat Crawford Brown |
| Bryan | | | | Ryan Potter |

Note: A gray cell indicates character did not appear in that medium.

=== Crew ===
| Crew | Films | | |
| Crew | Fred: The Movie | Fred 2: Night of the Living Fred | Fred 3: Camp Fred |
|---|---|---|---|
| Director(s) | Clay Weiner | John Fortenberry | Jonathan Judge |
| Producer(s) | Lucas Cruikshank; Brian Robbins; Sharla Sumpter Bridgett | Brian Robbins; Sharla Sumpter Bridgett | Don Dunn |
| Writer(s) | David A. Goodman | David A. Goodman | Drew Hancock |
| Composers(s) | Roddy Bottum | Roddy Bottum | Louie Schultz |
| Cinematographer(s) | Scott Henrikson | Matthew Rudenberg | Brandon Mastrippolito |
| Editor(s) | Ned Bastille | Ned Bastille | Andrey Ragozin |
