= Niki and Gabi Take Bahamas =

- Genre: Reality
- Created by: Katherine Martinez
- Starring: Niki and Gabi
- Country of origin: United States
- Original language: English
- No. of episodes: 7

Production
- Executive producers: Gabi DeMartino; Ian Midura
- Camera setup: Single
- Running time: 27 minutes

Original release
- Network: AwesomenessTV
- Release: April 18 – May 30, 2020

Related
- Niki and Gabi Spring Break

Niki and Gabi Take Bahamas is an American reality web series. It premiered on AwesomenessTV on April 18, 2020, starring American acting and singing duo Niki and Gabi and follows their trip to the Bahamas. The fifth season of Niki and Gabi Spring Break originally premiered in 2017.

== Synopsis ==
Niki and Gabi escape the suburbs for a vacation to the Bahamas with a few of their best friends. A lot happens on the island, they party, they fight and they make up. They fight for each other and also against each other.

== Cast ==
=== Main ===
- Gabi DeMartino
- Niki DeMar
- Alex DeMartino
- Collin Vogt
- Nate West

=== Supporting ===
- Alex Byrd
- Jessie Marie
- Wot Dennis
- Kyle Werner
- Rachel Weiss

== Episodes ==
All episodes information taking from AwesomenessTV.

No. overall	No. in season	Title	Original release date	U.S. viewers (millions)
1	1	"Creep in The Club"	April 18, 2020	2.35
Niki and Gabi are BACK and in the Bahamas to party with their best friends. But when a creep in the club threatens their good time, the crew bands together to protect each other...and their fun.
2	2	"He won't pay attention to me"	April 25, 2020	1.73
Niki's Bahamas vacation turns into the opposite of paradise when triggers of sister jealousy and Nate not paying attention to her start to collide. But that's the least of Niki's problems when her and Nate discover their room has been trashed, and no one is fessing up.
3	3	"The Problem is You"	May 2, 2020	1.86
What's the problem? It's beach day for the group as they shred waves and try to stay away from the drama. But what starts as a fun day in the sun quickly takes a takes a turn as Gabi leaves Niki in tears.
4	4	"Judged By Strangers"	May 9, 2020	1.36
She did not just say that. Niki, Gabi and their friends plan for a fun day hanging around town, but when a stranger makes a rude remark against Dennis, everyone bands together in defense.
5	5	"Getting Sent Home"	May 19, 2020	1.47
She has to go. There's always drama when Niki, Gabi and their friends let their true emotions show. But just as soon as they try to make up, it proves too little and too late, when one of them gets sent home.
6	6	"She Snapped *Panic Attack in the Ocean"	May 23, 2020	1.46
This was the WORST idea. Niki, Gabi and their friends have fun plans to explore an island off the Bahamas, but getting there proves to be the hardest part when Niki snaps and has a panic attack in the middle of the ocean.
7	7	"Don't You Realize What I've Done for You"	May 30, 2020	1.57
What was supposed to be a fun last day in paradise for Niki, Gabi and their friends, turns into a screaming match between Gabi and a housemate you'd least expect.

== Post-Production Conflict ==
The series caused online drama between the twins when Niki posted topless pictures with Gabi and their friends. Further drama occurred between some of the other cast members. Alex DeMartino and Rachel Weiss got into an argument which was apparently caused by Alex shoving Rachel. Niki got hate online for staying friends with Rachel after the ordeal. The twins ceased making video content together for several months in late 2020 before resuming in the spring of 2021. They explained that the time they spent apart during the COVID-19 pandemic, helped them understand each other and made their relationship stronger.
