= The Joy of Motion =

Studio album by Animals as Leaders
- Released: March 24, 2014
- Recorded: November 2013
- Genres: Progressive metal; djent; jazz fusion; instrumental rock
- Length: 54:23
- Label: Sumerian
- Producer: Misha Mansoor

Animals as Leaders chronology
Weightless (2011)	The Joy of Motion (2014)	The Madness of Many (2016)

Singles from The Joy of Motion
- 1. "Tooth and Claw" Released: February 18, 2014; 2. "Lippincott" Released: February 26, 2014

Professional ratings
Review scores
Source	Rating
Alternative Press	4/5 stars
The Circle Pit	10/10 stars
Music Radar	5/5 stars
Sputnikmusic	4.7/5 stars
Ultimate Guitar	9.3/10

The Joy of Motion is the third studio album by American instrumental progressive metal band Animals as Leaders. It was released on March 24, 2014, in Europe, March 25, 2014, in North America and on March 28, 2014, in Australia and New Zealand by Sumerian Records. The entire album was previously made available on YouTube on March 19, 2014.

Around 13,000 copies of The Joy of Motion were bought in the United States during the first week of its release. It debuted at No. 23 on the Billboard 200, the band's highest position on the chart. It has sold 50,000 copies in the United States as of November 2016.

On March 25, 2014, the band played their album release show on the Seattle date of their tour with After the Burial and Chon to celebrate the album's release date.

A music video was produced for the song "Physical Education", featuring the band playing the song in a school gymnasium, intercut with comedic scenes involving Abasi, Reyes, and Garstka as the school's principal, teacher, and janitor, respectively.

== Music ==
The Joy of Motion has been described as a blend of the band's usual progressive metal technicality with elements of electronic, Latin, and dance-pop.

== Track listing ==
All tracks written by Animals as Leaders.

No.	Title	Length
1.	"Ka$cade"	5:23
2.	"Lippincott"	4:22
3.	"Air Chrysalis"	5:06
4.	"Another Year"	3:50
5.	"Physical Education"	4:41
6.	"Tooth and Claw"	4:23
7.	"Crescent"	4:23
8.	"The Future That Awaited Me"	4:33
9.	"Para Mexer"	4:29
10.	"The Woven Web"	4:07
11.	"Mind-Spun"	4:35
12.	"Nephele"	4:31
Total length:		54:23

== Personnel ==
Animals as Leaders

- Tosin Abasi – lead guitar
- Javier Reyes – rhythm guitar
- Matt Garstka – drums, percussion

Guest musicians

- Misha Mansoor – bass (except: 2, 6, 9), programming, keyboards (tracks: 1, 2, 3, 4, 6, 8, 10)
- Adam "Nolly" Getgood – bass (tracks: 2, 6, 9)
- Diego Farias – programming (tracks: 5, 7, 11)

Production

- Misha Mansoor – co-writing, pre-production
- Adam "Nolly" Getgood – production, engineering, mixing
- Diego Farias – co-writing, pre-production
- Forrester Savell – mastering
- Navene Koperweis – electronics production
- Sam Martin – drum-recording engineering
- Jeff Dunne – drum editing
- Chris Carder – photography
- Rose Marincil – photography
- Jay Wynne – artwork, design
