= Individual (EP) =

EP by Niki & Gabi
- Released: July 27, 2018
- Genres: Electropop; dance-pop; EDM
- Length: 20:04
- Labels: Niki & Gabi
- Producers: Alina Smith; Elli Moore; (collectively known as "LYRE")

Singles from Individual
- 1. "R U" Released: August 11, 2017; 2. "Sleep It Off" Released: June 29, 2018; 3. "Let It Roar" / "Flowers" Released: July 13, 2018

Individual (stylized in all caps) is the debut extended play (EP) by American duo Niki & Gabi. It was released independently on July 27, 2018. Musically, Individual is primarily a dance-pop and electropop record that heavily incorporates elements of EDM. It was produced by the female production duo LYRE.

The EP was preceded by four singles: "R U", "Sleep It Off", "Let It Roar" and "Flowers". Commercially, Individual performed well on Billboard component charts, peaking at number 14 on the Heatseekers Albums chart and number 32 on the Independent Albums chart.

== Background ==
Twin sisters Niki and Gabi started their career in 2010 following the creation of their YouTube channel, 00RemakeGirls. Besides the comedy skits that were posted on that channel, the duo also posted covers of songs, and performed in several concerts. Following the release of their song "We're Not Over" in 2014, they talked about their plans of releasing an album in the future.

In 2016, the duo began working on their first extended play, and it was announced in 2017 that they would be releasing a five-track EP in November. The lead single "R U" was released in August 2017. "Sleep It Off" was released as the EP's second single in June 2018. In an interview with Post Magazine, director Aaron Grasso talked about working on five music videos with Niki and Gabi, including "Sleep It Off" and "Let It Roar".

The double singles "Let It Roar" and "Flowers" were released in July. The song "Let It Roar" served as Niki's debut solo single, and its music video was released on July 20. "Flowers" was a follow-up to Gabi's 2016 debut single "Ever After". Its music video was released on July 25, and it featured a guest appearance from American media personality Paris Hilton.

== Promotion ==
In December 2017, Lyre shared a photo of Niki & Gabi on their Instagram account, revealing that their EP would be released in 2018. An acoustic version of "R U" has been performed at SweetyHigh, Popmania and What's Trending. It has also been performed live at the 2019 Streamy Awards. In 2021, Niki invited Gabi to perform "R U" at her Gramercy Theatre concert. It has also been included as a solo song in the setlist of Niki's 2022 Pink Kink & Punk Tour, in which she co-headlined with Kelsy Karter. "R U" was featured in the 2018 film Life Size 2.

Niki & Gabi appeared on Genius' series 'Verified' and broke down the lyrics to "Make It Sting". In December 2018, Niki performed "Let It Roar", "Anthem for the Judged" and a solo version of "Make It Sting" live at Billboard. The songs "Out From Under You" and "Make It Sting" both received lyric videos. Following the cancellation of the Individual Tour, Niki & Gabi held a live concert at iPlay America in December 2018 to promote and perform songs from the EP, as well as other several solo songs.

== Chart performance ==
Chart performance for Individual
Chart (2018)	Peak position
Heatseekers Albums (Billboard)	14
Independent Albums (Billboard)	32

== Track listing ==
All tracks are produced by Lyre, except where noted.

No.	Title	Writer(s)	Producer(s)	Length
1.	"R U"	Nathan Cunningham • Marc Sibley • Stephani Nicole Jones • Brandon Treyshun Campbell	Space Primates	2:57
2.	"Make It Sting"	Tiffany Vartanyan • Johan Fransson		3:15
3.	"Sleep It Off"	Riley McDonough • Connor McDonough • Toby McDonough • Whitney Phillips • Joonas Angeria		3:47
4.	"Flowers"	Sophie Rose • Michael Matosic • Budgie Beats		3:32
5.	"Let It Roar"	Annalise Morelli		3:13
6.	"Out From Under You"	Alex Nobile • Michael Paul Gutierrez • Lucas Marx • Lydia Frutig		3:20
Total length:				20:04

== Personnel ==
- Gabi DeMartino – vocals (1,2,3,4,6)
- Niki DeMar – vocals (1,2,3,5,6)
- Alina Smith – production (2,3,4,5,6)
- Elli Moore – production (2,3,4,5,6), songwriter (5)
- Nathan Cunningham – production (1), songwriting (1)
- Marc Sibley – production (1), songwriting (1)
- Stephanie Jones – songwriting (1)
- Brandon Campbell – songwriting (1)
