= What Now (film) =

- Promotional poster for What Now
- Directed by: Ash Avildsen
- Written by: Ash Avildsen
- Produced by: Jamie Adler; Lorenzo Antonucci; Ash Avildsen; Jeffrey Ronald Cohen; Wael Hourani; Jeff Kranzdorf; Brad LaFave; Frank Nasso; Cleo Valente
- Starring: Jeffree Star; Ash Avildsen; Joseph Cassiere; Lorenzo Antonucci
- Cinematography: Samuel Brownfield
- Edited by: Dan Dobi
- Production companies: Sumerian Films; What Now Productions
- Distributed by: Gravitas Ventures; Green Apple Entertainment
- Release date: March 19, 2015
- Running time: 100 minutes
- Country: United States
- Language: English
- Budget: $250,000

What Now is a 2015 American romantic comedy film written and directed by Ash Avildsen. It also stars Avildsen.

== Plot ==
The film follows three best friends in Los Angeles navigating online dating, where they encounter challenges related to social status, career expectations, and social media presence.

DJ works as a disc jockey (DJ) at a strip called named Pink Lips. Bruno works security at Pink Lips, and Joey works as a travel agent. They all live together in B-Murda's house, but it is their last weekend there. B-Murda is getting married, and his fiancé wants his friends to move out. They all decide to try a new dating app at a friend's suggestion. They quickly find out that girls do not like their day jobs, but they can lie about what they do.

The movie culminates in a party at B-Murda's house. Ice-T makes an appearance at the party and performs a live version of "99 Problems".

== Cast ==
- Ash Avildsen as DJ
- Joseph Cassiere as Joey
- Lorenzo Antonucci as Bruno
- Bizzy Bone as B-Murda
- K.D. Aubert as Katrina
- Ice-T as himself
- Rachel Delante as Kelly
- Bridget Avildsen as Rachel
- Jeffree Star as Victoria
- Mark Child as Jock
- Mark Rhino Smith as Danny the Jamaican Barman
- Christine Solomon as Melissa

== Release ==
What Now was released to select theaters March 19, 2015 and on cable and VOD platforms April 3, 2015.
