= Paradise City (2021 TV series) =

Musical drama series

- Season 1 promotional art
- Genre: Musical drama
- Created by: Ash Avildsen
- Written by: Ash Avildsen
- Directed by: Ash Avildsen
- Starring: Andy Biersack; Drea de Matteo; Booboo Stewart; Bella Thorne; Rhys Coiro; Fairuza Balk; Perrey Reeves; Ben Bruce; Brooke Lyons; Cameron Boyce; Mark Boone Junior; Amanda Steele; Brittany Furlan; Olivia Culpo; Hopsin; Ryan Hurst; Jim Ross
- Composer: Isabella Summers
- Country of origin: United States
- Original language: English
- No. of seasons: 1
- No. of episodes: 8

Production
- Executive producers: Ash Avildsen; Lorenzo Antonucci; Jeffrey Ronald Cohen
- Producers: Glenn Garland; Brad Lafave; Bobbi Sue Luther
- Cinematography: Michael Alden Lloyd
- Editors: Brandon Amelotte; Andrew Brueck; Joel Salazar
- Running time: 33-40 minutes
- Production company: Sumerian Films

Original release
- Network: Amazon Prime Video
- Release: March 25, 2021

Paradise City is an American musical drama television series created by Ash Avildsen for Amazon Prime Video. It is a sequel to and continuation of American Satan (2017), and second installment in the franchise of the same name. The series premiered on March 25, 2021.

== Production ==
=== Background ===
In 2019, it was reported that a spin-off based on American Satan would be created, and that musicians Andy Biersack and Remington Leith would reprise their roles in the series. It also stars Bella Thorne, Ryan Hurst, and Cameron Boyce in his final role.

=== Development ===
The first teaser was released on May 1, 2020. A trailer for the series was released in December 2020.

In an interview with TheWrap, director Avildsen stated that he hoped to begin filming a second season before the end of 2021, but expressed concern over how to recast Boyce's role, who he felt was "the heartbeat for the audience." In December 2024, a second movie "American Satan II: The Beast Goes On" was announced on Instagram.

== Cast ==
- Andy Biersack as Johnny Faust, frontman of the Relentless
  - Remington Leith as Johnny's singing voice
- Ben Bruce as Leo Donovan, a member of the Relentless
- James Cassells as Dylan James, drummer for the Relentless
- Booboo Stewart as Vic Lakota, guitarist in the Relentless
- Bella Thorne as Lily Mayflower, bassist in the Relentless
  - Lzzy Hale as Lily’s singing voice
- Mark Boone Junior as Elias Collins, owner of Akkadian Records
- Drea de Matteo as Maya, booking agent
- Ryan Hurst as Oliver Ostergaard
- Fairuza Balk as Lizzie Thomas, Vivian's mother, and Faith's grandmother
- Perrey Reeves as Natalie, Simon's mother
- Brooke Lyons as Capricorn
- Rhys Coiro as Adam Stone, the Relentless's manager
- Amanda Steele as Vivian Thomas, Faith's mother
- Olivia Culpo as Gretchen, Johnny Faust's girlfriend
- Cameron Boyce as Simon, son of Oliver and Natalie
- Hopsin as Gabriel
- Natalie Eva Marie as Jade, Lily's girlfriend
- Ned Bellamy as Ross
- Randy Blythe as Dom, leader of a veteran band called Over It All
- Sid Wilson as Fritz, a rapper
- Brittany Furlan as Janis Stone, Adam Stone's wife
- Nita Strauss as Val Wolfe
- Ash Avildsen as Levi Svengali
- Juliet Simms as Sheva, singer of the Mavens
- Matt Pinfield as himself
- Jim Ross as Ned
- Porscha Coleman as Gloria
- Lenox Knight as Goth Vixen
- Kellin Quinn as Ralphie

== Episodes ==
| No. | Title | Directed by | Written by | Original release date |
|---|---|---|---|---|
| 1 | "Don't Let the Name Fool You" | Ash Avildsen | Ash Avildsen | March 25, 2021 |
| 2 | "A Groupie in the Tabloids" | Ash Avildsen | Ash Avildsen, Lorenzo Antonucci | March 25, 2021 |
| 3 | "From a Friend to a Foe" | Ash Avildsen | Ash Avildsen | March 25, 2021 |
| 4 | "The Man of the Hour" | Ash Avildsen | Ash Avildsen | March 25, 2021 |
| 5 | "A Couple of Shirley Temples" | Ash Avildsen | Ash Avildsen, Lorenzo Antonucci | March 25, 2021 |
| 6 | "Sing it to her Face" | Ash Avildsen | Ash Avildsen, Tom Zutaut | March 25, 2021 |
| 7 | "The Best Thing He Ever Created" | Ash Avildsen | Ash Avildsen | March 25, 2021 |
| 8 | "What's Your Last Name" | Ash Avildsen | Ash Avildsen | March 25, 2021 |

== Reception ==
Alexa Sutherland of Hollywood Insider praised the series' casting and portrayal of the rock and roll Los Angeles lifestyle.
