= Awesomeness (company) =

Deunct American media and entertainment company

Awesomeness, LLC
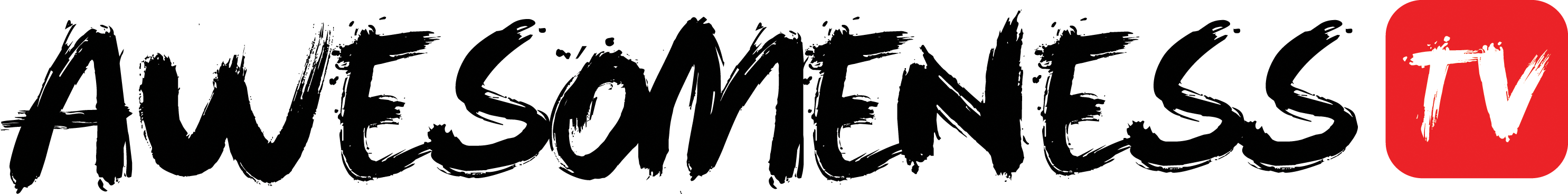
- Logo used from 2010 to 2018

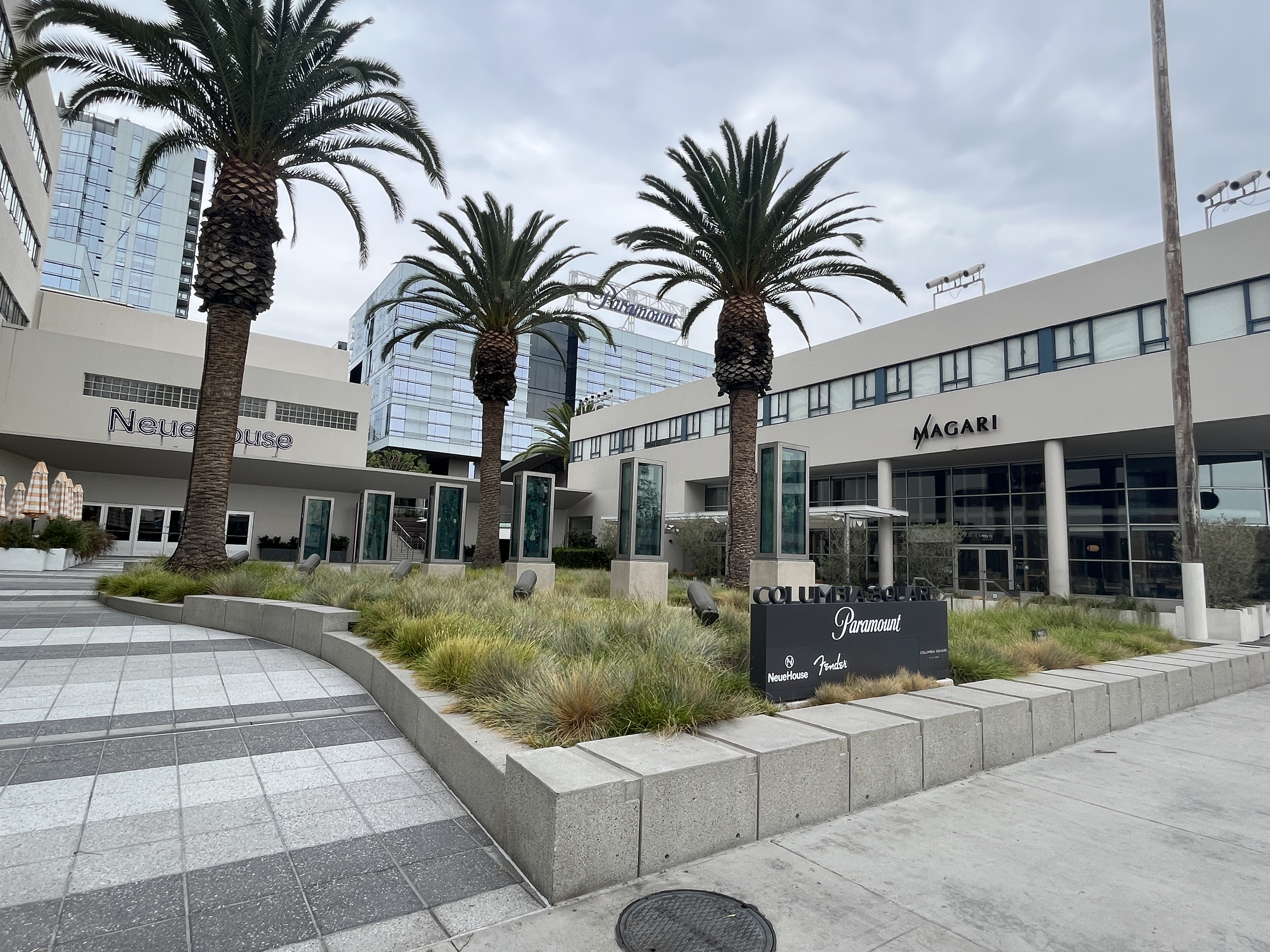
- Former Awesomeness headquarters at Columbia Square
- Trade name: AwesomenessTV
- Type: Division
- Founded: July 2012; 14 years ago
- Founders: Brian Robbins; Joe Davola
- Defunct: October 2025; 1 year ago
- Fate: Folded into Paramount Television Studios
- Successor: Paramount Television Studios
- Headquarters: 1575 N Gower Street, Los Angeles, California, United States
- Parent: DreamWorks Animation (2014–2018); Paramount Media Networks (2018–2021); Nickelodeon Group (2021–2025)
- Divisions: Awesomeness Ink; Awesomeness Films; Awesomeness News
- Website: Official website (now redirects to the Skydance website)

Awesomeness, LLC was an American digital media and entertainment network company owned by Paramount Skydance that was active from July 2012 to October 30, 2025. Established by Brian Robbins and Joe Davola, the studio focused on producing films and television shows for streaming services that target a generation Z audience.

The company initially operated as a YouTube channel and multi-channel network known as AwesomenessTV, which produced web series and other digital content targeting adolescents and young adults. The company later expanded into talent, branded content, music, publishing and retail businesses targeting that audience.

Within a year of formation, it was acquired DreamWorks Animation (DWA). Hearst Corporation acquired a 25% minority stake in 2014 and Verizon acquired another roughly-quarter stake in the company for $159 million (valuing it at $650 million) two years later, while AwesomenessTV entered into a multi-year deal to produce content for Verizon's streaming video service go90.

In 2018, following NBCUniversal's acquisition of DWA (which led to internal conflicts due to it being owned by Verizon competitor Comcast) and the shutdown of the fledgling go90, Viacom acquired AwesomenessTV for around $50 million – a fraction of its 2016 valuation. Prior to it becoming defunct, the studio has been producing long-form series and films, with the majority of its recent productions having been for Paramount+ and/or Nickelodeon.

On October 30, 2025, Awesomeness folded into Paramount Television Studios.

== History ==
=== Beginnings ===
In July 2012, founders Brian Robbins and Joe Davola launched AwesomnessTV as part of the YouTube Original Channel Initiative, producing various web series oriented towards a tween and teenage audience. Robbins had personally observed his two sons as examples of changing media consumption trends among the demographic, which had increasingly favored short-form internet video over television.

Robbins had been well known for his work on series such as One Tree Hill, Smallville, and several Nickelodeon series, such as the sketch comedy All That. In 2009, Robbins spearheaded the production of a film based on YouTube comedian Lucas Cruikshank's character Fred. Robbins and Cruikshank bankrolled it as an independent film for Nickelodeon—where it became the highest-rated basic-cable film of the year among youth in 2010 and spawned a larger franchise of Nickelodeon content featuring the character.

The channel had an initial slate of 15 series in development, including the talk show IMO; the stunt shows The Blow-Up Guys, teen drama The Runaways, and Awesomeness Sports (a series of videos that would feature professional athletes and showcase youth athletes). Davola compared the channel to MTV upon its launch, explaining that "it was maverick, it was brand new, it was something the young people were getting involved with."

Brett Bouttier joined as a chief operating officer in November 2012. In December 2012, AwesomenessTV launched a multi-channel network targeting similar demographics.

=== 2013–2018: DreamWorks and Verizon ===
On May 1, 2013, DreamWorks Animation announced its intent to acquire AwesomenessTV for $33 million. It was also announced that AwesomenessTV would develop and operate a YouTube channel focusing on content from DWA's franchises. In October 2013, the company partnered with the teen magazine Seventeen to operate its YouTube channel.

In April 2014, AwesomenessTV acquired the MCN and talent management company Big Frame for $15 million. That month, the company also hired former Claire's CEO James Fielding to lead a new consumer products division. In June 2014, AwesomenessTV launched DreamWorksTV, a YouTube channel that featured shorts and original series relating to DreamWorks franchises (such as Shrek, and the DreamWorks Classics library), as well as supplemental content promoting its upcoming films. The following month, the record label Awesomeness Music was announced, in partnership with Universal Music Group.

In September 2014, AwesomenessTV partnered with the department store chain Kohl's to launch a teen fashion line co-branded with its web series Life's S.o. R.a.d., as its first consumer product line. In October 2014, AwesomenessTV launched the publishing label AwesomenessInk, and Netflix ordered a live-action Richie Rich sitcom from AwesomenessTV as part of an ongoing development deal with DWA. In December 2014, Seventeen publisher Hearst Corporation acquired a 25% stake in the company for $81.25 million.

In June 2015, the company hired former Lionsgate executive Matt Kaplan as president of Awesomeness Films. In August 2015, AwesomenessTV announced an output deal with Canadian children's media conglomerate DHX Media, in which the companies would co-develop and license new original content, with DHX handling international distribution and merchandising. DHX also began to acquire the studio's programming to air on its owned television network Family Channel.

On April 6, 2016, Verizon Communications — which had acquired several series from the studio (such as Guidance) for its ad-supported streaming service go90 — acquired a 24.5% stake in AwesomenessTV for $159 million, valuing the company at $650 million. Alongside the equity stake, the deal included a multi-year, $180 million investment for the studio to produce content for Verizon, for which it would hold exclusive U.S. distribution rights. Verizon and AwesomenessTV also planned to launch a branded, subscription-based video service targeting mobile devices.

On April 28, 2016, Comcast-owned NBCUniversal announced its intent to acquire DreamWorks Animation for $3.8 billion, in a deal completed August 22, 2016. On February 22, 2017, Brian Robbins stepped down as AwesomenessTV's CEO. On November 1, 2017, it was announced that Kelly Day would step down as Chief Business Officer to become the new CEO for Viacom Digital Studios.

In February 2017, it was reported that the planned premium content service with Verizon had been shelved, with content investments reallocated to go90.

=== 2018–2025: Viacom/Paramount and Paramount Skydance ===
After a struggled launch and performance below expectations, Verizon shut down go90 in July 2018. Digiday reported that Verizon's content investments with AwesomenessTV had accounted for approximately 40% of the studio's revenue, which led to concerns over how the company would run without this backing. The acquisition of DWA by NBCUniversal led to animosity within the venture, as its stake was now owned by Verizon competitor Comcast. The two companies had also become uninterested in the venture, as the exits of Brian Robbins and DWA CEO Jeffrey Katzenberg had lessened the appeal of the venture to Verizon, while Comcast did not think that the company was one of DWA's core assets, or fit alongside its other digital media investments (such as BuzzFeed). The company had planned a downsizing under its new CEO Jordan Levin.

On July 25, 2018, Viacom announced that it was in talks to acquire AwesomenessTV for a fraction of the company's $650 million valuation in 2016. Two days later, on July 27, Viacom officially announced the purchase, with a valuation initially reported to be $25 million plus the assumption of debt, but later $50 million. Operations of DreamWorksTV were taken in-house by NBCUniversal Direct-to-Consumer and Digital Enterprises after the purchase. Jordan Levin left his position as CEO following the acquisition.

Since the sale, the studio has shortened its name to Awesomeness, and has operated under Viacom Digital Studios. It has focused on productions for subscription video on-demand platforms such as Hulu, Netflix, and Paramount+ that target a generation Z audience, such as the Netflix film To All the Boys I've Loved Before, and Hulu original series PEN15—which was nominated for Outstanding Comedy Series at the 73rd Primetime Emmy Awards. Viacom also launched an Awesomeness-branded channel on Pluto TV after acquiring the service in early-2019.

By January 2021, when Awesomeness' parent Viacom re-merged with CBS Corporation to form ViacomCBS (later known as Paramount Global) on December 4, 2019 two years earlier, Awesomeness announced it had consolidated its live-action film & television production operations including current series & studio content and had them combined with those of ViacomCBS's fellow production subsidiary Nickelodeon Group into forming one live-action production arm under the Awesomeness & Nickelodeon Productions names following the departure of Awesomeness executive VP of live-action Shelley Zimmerman to join Bad Attitude Entertainment as president of TV. Shauna Phelan, Nickelodeon's head of live-action production and Zack Olin would serve as co-presidents of the combined Nickelodeon/Awesomeness Live-Action Studio with them heading Awesomeness's live-action production operations whilst Awesomeness's film division & Nickelodeon VP Syrinthia Studer would oversee the combined production outfit Nickelodeon/Awesomeness Live-Action Studio as executive vice president of live-action films.

Following Paramount Global's merger with Skydance Media to form Paramount Skydance (now just simply Skydance) on August 7, 2025, Nickelodeon/Awesomeness Live-Action production studio under the Awesomeness and Nickelodeon Productions names and production state including Awesomeness' currently running television series XO, Kitty and School Spirits were absorbed into a revived Paramount Television Studios on October 30, 2025 during the production of Victorious spin-off series Hollywood Arts, which was originally ordered by Nickelodeon. A week later in that month, it was announced that Awesomeness would be merged into Paramount Television Studios following the latter's absorption of Awesomeness' production assets.

== Other services ==
On October 14, 2014, Awesomeness launched a digital young adult publishing unit.

On June 23, 2015, AwesomenessTV announced its launch of a film division.

In 2017, AwesomenessTV launched a news division.

== Filmography ==
=== Television productions ===
Title	Years	Network	Notes
Mindless Behavior	2012	YouTube	
The Underground	2012	YouTube	
AwesomenessTV	2013–2015	Nickelodeon	co-production with Nickelodeon Productions
Richie Rich	2015	Netflix	co-production with DreamWorks Animation and Harvey Entertainment; Rights held by DreamWorks Animation
My Dream Quinceañera	2015–2022	YouTube/Paramount+	
Project Mc^{2}	2015–2017	Netflix	co-production with MGA Entertainment and Katlin/Bernstein Productions
Guidance	2015–2017	go90	
Foursome	2016–2018	YouTube Premium	
T@gged	2016–2018	go90 (season 1-2); Hulu (season 3)	
Freakish	2016–2017	Hulu	
Zac & Mia	2017–2019	go90 (season 1); Hulu (season 2)	
My Dead Ex	2018	go90	
Light as a Feather	2018–2019	Hulu	co-production with Grammnet Productions and Wattpad Studios
All Night	2018	Hulu	
Overthinking with Kat & June	2018	YouTube Premium	
PEN15	2019–2021	Hulu	co-production with Lonely Island Classics, Odenkirk Provissiero Entertainment, Drama Leo (season 2), Damma Entertainment (season 2) and Family Version (season 2)
Trinkets	2019–2020	Netflix	co-production with Two Blocks Apart Productions
Niki and Gabi Take Bahamas	2020	YouTube	
Next Influencer	2020–2022	AwesomenessTV (2020–21); Paramount+ (2022)	
Drama Club	2021	Nickelodeon	co-production with Nickelodeon Productions
Love Allways	2023	Paramount+	

=== Film productions ===
Release date	Title	Co-production companies	Distributor
June 21, 2014	Terry the Tomboy	Nickelodeon Productions	Nickelodeon
December 12, 2014	Expelled	N/A	20th Century Fox
July 24, 2015	Smosh: The Movie	Smosh Productions; Defy Media	20th Century Fox (North America); Netflix (International)
October 11, 2016	Shovel Buddies	Awesomeness Films; Film 360; Entertainment 360	20th Century Fox
January 21, 2017	Before I Fall	Awesomeness Films; Jon Shestack Productions	Open Road Films
June 23, 2017	You Get Me	Awesomeness Films	Netflix
August 17, 2018	To All the Boys I've Loved Before	Awesomeness Films; Overbrook Entertainment	Netflix
April 12, 2019	The Perfect Date	Awesomeness Films; Ace Entertainment	Netflix
February 12, 2020	To All the Boys: P.S. I Still Love You	Awesomeness Films; Ace Entertainment	Netflix
October 6, 2020	Spontaneous	Awesomeness Films; Jurassic Party Productions	Paramount Pictures
February 12, 2021	To All the Boys: Always and Forever	Awesomeness Films; Ace Entertainment	Netflix
July 29, 2022	Honor Society	Awesomeness Films; Guardian Pictures	Paramount+
March 13, 2024	Little Wing	Awesomeness Films	Paramount+
