= Animals as Leaders (album) =

Studio album by Animals as Leaders
- Released: April 28, 2009
- Recorded: March–June 2008
- Genres: Progressive metal; djent; instrumental rock
- Length: 52:00
- Label: Prosthetic
- Producer: Misha Mansoor

Animals as Leaders chronology
Animals as Leaders (2009)	Weightless (2011)

Alternative cover
- 2015 Encore Edition

Animals as Leaders is the debut studio album by American instrumental progressive metal band Animals as Leaders. It was released on April 28, 2009 by Prosthetic Records. In 2015, a reissue titled Animals as Leaders – Encore Edition was released with bonus tracks.

== Background ==
Before Animals as Leaders Tosin Abasi was a member of metalcore band Reflux that had been disbanded. Reflux's former record label Prosthetic Records saw Abasi's guitar work and asked him to create a solo album for them. Abasi initially declined, feeling such an endeavor would be "egotistical and unnecessary". Afterwards, Abasi enrolled in the Atlanta Institute of Music which helped give him new creative ideas for music composition. Abasi later changed his mind saying that "doing a solo album seemed to make a lot more sense", and decided to take the label's offer. However, he did not want the project's new album to just represent the idea of one person. Abasi's school experience aided him in developing ideas for the album. While at school he learned fundamental harmony, jazz playing standards, and improved on playing classical guitar.

== Composition, recording and production ==
Animals as Leaders was recorded in early 2008. Abasi recorded all guitar and bass tracks on the album; drums and various synthesized effects were programmed by engineer Misha Mansoor (Periphery, Haunted Shores).

Abasi and Mansoor are credited for composing the music for all tracks on Animals as Leaders. All twelve tracks on the album are guitar driven instrumentals that are intended to showcase Abasi's guitar skills. Abasi uses techniques such as tremolo picking, sweep-picking, two-handed tapping, fingerpicking, and slapping throughout the album.

== Release and reception ==
Professional ratings
Review scores
Source	Rating
AllMusic	3.5/5 stars
Rock Sound	9.5/10 stars

The album was released on April 28, 2009 by Prosthetic Records, and was met with positive reviews. It was also called "the 12th best album of 2009" by MetalSucks.

Ken McGrath of Rock Sound described the album as "a space-prog head-trip" and compared its sound to Dream Theater, Porcupine Tree, 65daysofstatic, and Meshuggah.

== Track listing ==
All tracks written by Tosin Abasi and Misha Mansoor.

No.	Title	Length
1.	"Tempting Time"	5:23
2.	"Soraya"	4:27
3.	"Thoroughly at Home"	4:02
4.	"On Impulse"	6:09
5.	"Tessitura"	1:06
6.	"Behaving Badly"	4:26
7.	"The Price of Everything and the Value of Nothing"	5:32
8.	"CAFO"	6:41
9.	"Inamorata"	6:08
10.	"Point to Point"	1:44
11.	"Modern Meat"	2:06
12.	"Song of Solomon"	4:16
Total length:		52:00

Encore Edition bonus tracks
No.	Title	Length
13.	"Wave of Babies"	5:29
14.	"Kalimba"	6:38
15.	"Orea" (Demo)	1:57
Total length:		66:04

== Personnel ==
- Tosin Abasi – guitars, bass, production
- Misha Mansoor – bass, production, engineering, drum programming, mixing, mastering
- Vinny Vinh - drums (bonus track "Kalimba")
- Jay Wynne – artwork, design
