= American Satan =

2017 American supernatural musical thriller film

- Theatrical release poster
- Directed by: Ash Avildsen
- Written by: Ash Avildsen; Matty Beckerman
- Produced by: Ash Avildsen; Matty Beckerman; Sean E. Demott; Andy Gould; Jeff Rice; Isen Robbins; Aimee Schoof
- Starring: Andy Biersack; Ben Bruce; John Bradley; Booboo Stewart; Drake Bell; Denise Richards; Malcolm McDowell
- Cinematography: Andrew Strahorn
- Music by: Jonathan Davis; Nicholas O'Toole; Lesly Jaco
- Production companies: Sumerian Films; Jeff Rice Films; Intrinsic Value Films
- Distributed by: Miramax
- Release date: October 13, 2017
- Running time: 112 minutes
- Country: United States
- Language: English
- Box office: $237,708

American Satan is a 2017 American supernatural musical thriller film directed by Ash Avildsen, who also wrote the screenplay with Matty Beckerman. It was released in theaters on Friday October 13, 2017, and stars Andy Biersack, Ben Bruce, Drake Bell, Denise Richards, Malcolm McDowell, Booboo Stewart, and Tori Black. The film marked Larry King's final film role before his death in January 2021. It won an award for Best Narrative Feature at the 2017 Oceanside International Film Festival.

The movie successfully launched the titular franchise.

== Plot ==
The Relentless are an aspiring rock band, half from England and half from the US. The band's vocalist, Johnny Faust, lives in Columbus, Ohio, with his mother and his girlfriend Gretchen. Other band members are Dylan, Leo and Ricky. After relocating to Los Angeles to become famous, they hold auditions for a bassist and choose a woman, Lily.

While leaving a liquor store, some of the members encounter a homeless man who tells them to rely on feeling more than perception. Moments later, the band is accosted by another man who implies he is the Devil and can make them stars if they perform a human sacrifice. Lily tells Johnny that Damien, an ex-band member of hers, raped her one night. Johnny learns his mother has breast cancer and cannot afford treatment. After Damien insults Johnny's mother, the band decides to sacrifice Damien. They lock him in a van and set it aflame, but Johnny has a change of heart and lets Damien escape. However, when Damien climbs an electrical fence, he dies from electrocution.

The Relentless land a record deal and record an album, American Satan, and begin touring. In Kansas, a bar fight results in a man's death and Johnny is arrested, but he is acquitted. This inspires The Relentless's fans to confront their bullies, leading to more deaths, all blamed on the band.

Johnny and Gretchen try to maintain their long-distance relationship but matters are complicated when Johnny and Lily sleep together. Ricky overdoses on cocaine and dies. This leads to Leo heavily using alcohol and pills. Gretchen dumps Johnny, and he turns to heroin and sex with Lily to cope.

A teen female fan's mother convinces Johnny to take the teen's virginity; meanwhile, Dylan has sex with the mother. They later learn that once the girl's father learned about this, he killed himself. Johnny overdoses on heroin and almost dies, but he is revived by a paramedic — the homeless man from earlier.

Johnny enters drug rehabilitation, but Lily refuses to go and disappears. The American Satan album is well-received and tops the charts. The band is successful, performing more shows and receiving adoration but also criticism, leading them to almost quit the music industry.

Johnny's mother receives treatment for her cancer, which goes into remission. Johnny unsuccessfully attempts to reconcile with Gretchen. The Relentless land a gig at a music festival, but the Devil says that they have to kill a man during their performance, though he intends to make it look like part of the concert.

The night of the show, Lily returns. The Devil appears in the guise of Johnny's mother's new boyfriend. As the band is onstage performing, Johnny holds a gun to his head before shooting and killing the Devil. He is arrested.

In prison, Johnny is visited by the archangel Gabriel — the homeless man — who explains that Johnny has a choice in his future and to go with his feelings. Gretchen visits Johnny and reveals she still loves him. She introduces him to a lawyer, Damien's father who is able to get Johnny released on a technicality.

== Cast ==
- Andy Biersack as Johnny Faust, lead singer of The Relentless; music vocals by Remington Leith of Palaye Royale
- Malcolm McDowell as The Devil, Mr. Capricorn
- John Bradley as Ricky Rollins, manager of The Relentless
- Booboo Stewart as Vic Lakota, one of the two guitarists of The Relentless; guitar music by Lee McKinney of Born of Osiris
- Mark Boone Junior as Elias Collins, owner/head of Akkadian Records
- Ben Bruce as Leo Donovan, the band's other guitarist
- Jesse Sullivan as Lily Mayflower, the band's bassist
- Sebastian Gregory as Dylan James, the band's drummer
- Olivia Culpo as Gretchen, Johnny's girlfriend
- Bill Goldberg as Hawk, The Relentless' tour manager
- Larry King as himself
- Bill Duke as the archangel Gabriel
- Denise Richards as Ms. Faust, Johnny's mother
- Drake Bell as Damien Collins, leader of the band Damien's Inferno
- Tori Black as Cassandra
- Acacia Brinley as Michelle

== Reception ==
On review aggregator Rotten Tomatoes, the film has an approval rating of 78% based on reviews from nine critics, with an average rating of 8/10.

Emilie Black of Cinema Crazed gave the film 4 out of 5 and wrote: "American Satan is a film it might take time for fans to discover but it will more than likely get a following in the next few years." Bobby LePire of Film Threat gave it a grade of A− and wrote: "American Satan doesn't put enough time toward one of the most crucial relationships in the movie for it to work. But the acting is excellent, the directing is stylized and energetic, the characters are interesting, the ending is remarkable."

Kaitlyn Tiffany of The Verge gave it a negative review: "In the space of 90 minutes, it captures some of the worst acting ever committed to film..." saying that star Andy Biersack has no acting ability whatsoever.

== Television series ==
A TV series spin-off, Paradise City, was announced as a continuation of the film. Andy Biersack and Ben Bruce along with other cast members reprise their roles from the film. Cameron Boyce makes a posthumous appearance in the show playing the role of Simon. Kellin Quinn of the band Sleeping With Sirens is to also appear in the show, as is Randy Blythe of Lamb of God and Sid Wilson of Slipknot.

The first season of the show has eight episodes. A teaser was released on May 1 and the official trailer was posted onto the Sumerian Records YouTube channel on December 10, 2020. The series was released on Amazon Prime Video on March 25, 2021, while also being available to purchase on other platforms.

== See also ==
- Faust
- Deal with the Devil
