= Tosin Abasi =

American guitarist (born 1983)

- Abasi in 2014

Background information
- Born: January 7, 1983 (age 43); Washington, D.C.
- Genres: Progressive metal; djent; instrumental rock; jazz fusion; metalcore (early)
- Occupations: Guitarist
- Years active: 2000–present
- Labels: Prosthetic, Sumerian
- Member of: Animals as Leaders
- Formerly of: Reflux
- Website: animalsasleaders.org

Tosin Abasi (born January 7, 1983) is an American musician, best known as the founder and lead guitarist of the instrumental progressive metal band Animals as Leaders. He has recorded and released five albums with Animals as Leaders: a self-titled debut, Weightless, The Joy of Motion, The Madness of Many, and their most recent album, Parrhesia.

== Life and career ==
=== Background ===
Tosin Abasi was born in Washington D.C. to Nigerian immigrants to the United States. His brother, Abdul Abasi, is a former drill sergeant in the United States military and is currently a fashion designer.

Abasi is a mainly self-taught guitarist. He first picked up a guitar at his friend's house, simply strumming it and making up basic licks on the spot. At this time, he was being exposed to some music through learning the clarinet in elementary school. He later began to rent hair metal guitarists' instructional video tapes from his local music store, saying that some "were videos you did not want to be caught watching" due to the profane nature of hair metal videos.

Abasi said that when he decided to learn the guitar, his father was "totally liberal about the whole thing and encouraging and proud" and in fact, bought him his first guitar. However his mother initially held a more conservative outlook. Tosin said in an interview, "My mom definitely represents more of the traditional immigrant mentality of education and conventional channels being way more important than a creative endeavor".

=== Early career ===
He was the guitarist for the Silver Spring, Maryland-based metal band PSI before moving on to join the technical metalcore band Reflux in the early to mid-2000s, which also featured Evan Brewer (Fallujah, formerly of The Faceless, Animosity and Entheos), Ash Avildsen (CEO of Sumerian Records), Stephen Clifford of Circa Survive and co-founder John Mehoves. Reflux released one full length album “The Illusion of Democracy” in 2004 and a self-titled EP in 2002. During a Reflux show, Prosthetic Records noticed his skill and offered him a record deal as a solo artist. At first, he refused, saying he didn't feel comfortable with his skill level to write his own record. Afterwards, Abasi enrolled at the Atlanta Institute of Music and Media, a for-profit college. After graduating, he contacted Prosthetic Records asking if the offer still held. He then formed his "solo" project, Animals as Leaders, the name loosely being derived from the book Ishmael.

=== Animals as Leaders ===
In 2009, he recorded the first Animals as Leaders release with Misha Mansoor (of Periphery), who produced and recorded the album with Tosin, as well as programming the drums. Javier Reyes and Navene Koperweis were enlisted on rhythm guitar and drums, respectively, after the completion of the album, turning the project into a full touring band.

Animals as Leaders released their second album, Weightless, on November 8, 2011. Abasi was reportedly meeting with Misha Mansoor again in late 2012, and it was reported that a new Animals as Leaders album was in the works, due to be released in 2013.

At NAMM 2013, Tosin Abasi's signature guitar, the Ibanez TAM 100, was revealed. This guitar is based upon the Ibanez RG2228 model, which he had been using for some years, and contains his signature DiMarzio Ionizer pickups.

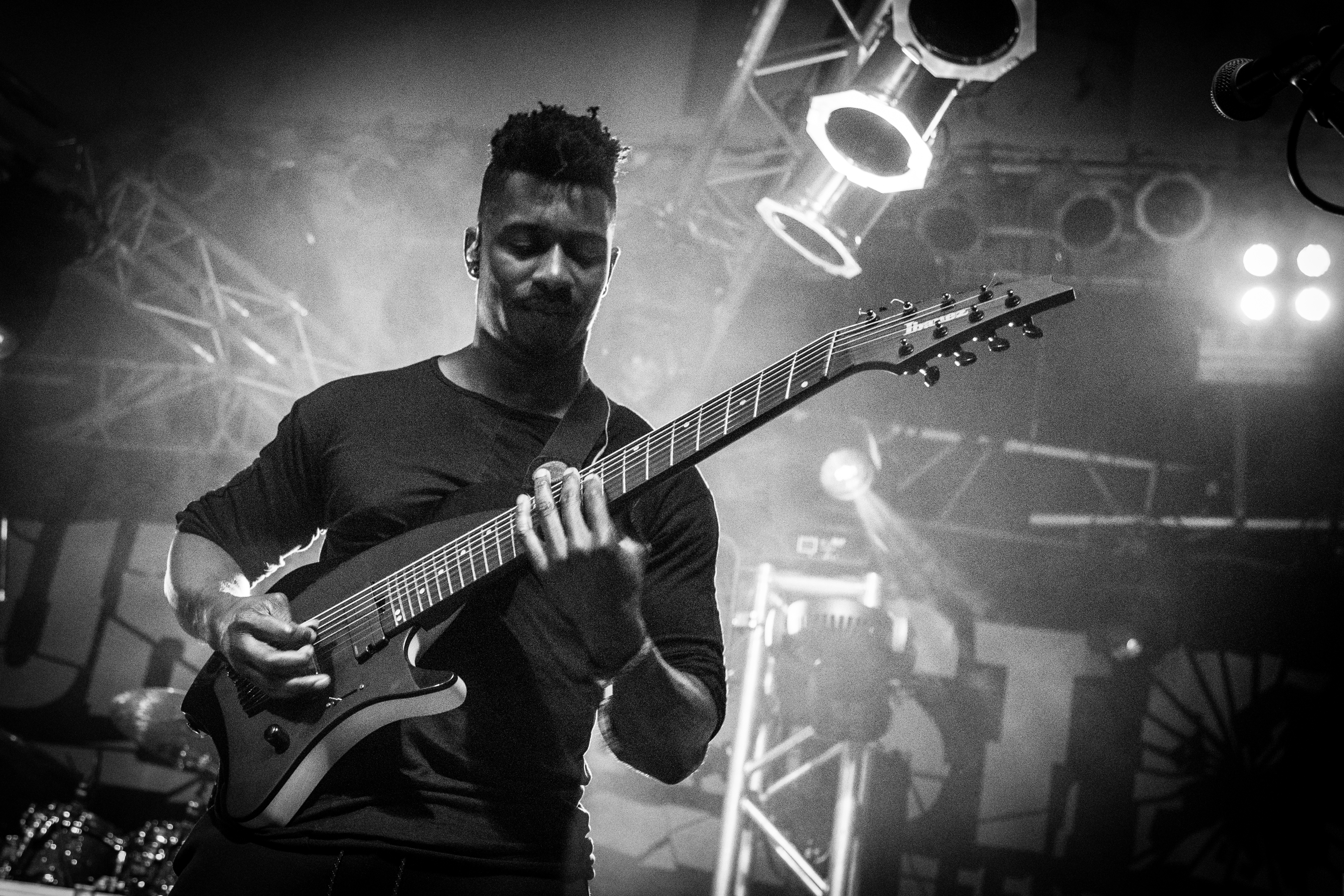
Tosin Abasi performing at the Euroblast Festival in Cologne, 2016

On March 19, 2014, the Animals As Leaders album The Joy of Motion was made available for streaming, via YouTube. On March 24, 2014, the album was released in Europe, March 25 in North America and on March 28 in Australia and New Zealand by Sumerian Records. The album was met with widely positive reviews. In July 2014, Tosin appeared in the first episode of Guitar Power, a web-series sponsored by D'Addario String and Rolling Stone Magazine.

In late March 2022, Animals as Leaders's Parrhesia was released; though generally positive, critics mostly held consensus that the album was not the band's strongest work: Metal Sucks gave the album a 3/5, citing shifts towards Abasi's minimalism style leading to more ambient work but fewer "wow" moments; Pitchfork gave the album a 7.3/10, noting the album as making strides towards a refinement of the group's style; Guitar.com rated the work 4 out of 5 stars.

=== Abasi Concepts ===
In 2017, after leaving Ibanez Guitars, Abasi wanted to expand on his design and include features such as locking tuners and 6 string options. As a result, Abasi founded Abasi Concepts, originally Abasi Guitars, offering a range of 6, 7 and 8 string instruments that feature his unique ergonomic design, locking tuners, signature Fishman pickups and unique wood combinations. Abasi started with Frank Falbo but had a public fallout with the builder over business issues. This led to Abasi Concepts switching to World Musical Instrument Co. Ltd as the manufacturer for their Legion Series, Dyna Gakki as the manufacturer for their JLarada Series and Grover Jackson Engineering as the manufacturer for their Master, Spartan and Space Telecaster (shortened to Space T) series. In 2022, Abasi Concepts expanded their offering by introducing the double-cut Emi.

=== Other appearances ===
Abasi toured with Born of Osiris as a stand-in guitarist for former member Matt Pantelis whilst they were auditioning for a permanent replacement.

In 2011, Tosin started putting together material for a new band, T.R.A.M., consisting of his Animals As Leaders bandmate Javier Reyes, Suicidal Tendencies drummer Eric Moore, and former The Mars Volta wind instrumentalist Adrián Terrazas-González. "T.R.A.M." stands for Terrazas, Reyes, Abasi, Moore. In mid-March 2011, T.R.A.M. played their first show at South by Southwest, a multi-day music festival in Austin, Texas. Tosin explained that he formed T.R.A.M. as a trio consisting of himself, Javier and Adrian as an outlet for some ideas he had written which he felt did not fit with Animals as Leaders. Eric Moore was not added into the lineup until the recording phase of the album, and wrote and performed all the drums on the album within a few weeks.

In October 2014, it was revealed that Abasi would join Joe Satriani, Guthrie Govan, and Mike Keneally on the G4 tour in 2015. In April and May 2016, Abasi joined fellow guitarists Nuno Bettencourt, Yngwie Malmsteen, Steve Vai, and Zakk Wylde, as part of the Generation Axe tour. The supergroup later reprised their tour in 2017 in Asia, and North America once more in 2018.

In August 2020, it was revealed that Abasi was the musician behind the "air guitar" shredding in Bill & Ted Face the Music.

== Equipment ==
=== Guitars ===
Abasi has played a wide variety of guitars over his career, but is most closely associated with his own brand Abasi Concepts, as well as Ernie Ball Music Man with a signature Kaizen model and Ibanez guitars with whom he had a signature model from 2013 to 2017. However he has also played and owned many other instruments including Strandberg, Kiesel guitars, and Rick Toone guitars. Notably, Abasi's collection reached into the hundreds, though many were sold off in 2020; as such, this list focuses primarily on the entries of particular, which have either been seen at workshops, on tour, social media videos, or were used in recording.

==== Primary electrics ====
- Abasi Concepts Larada and other Production instruments
- Ernie Ball Kaizen
- Ibanez RG series, particularly with the EMG 808X pickups
- The Ibanez TAM10, Abasi's first signature guitar with the brand
- The Ibanez TAM100, the second iteration of his signature model with the brand
- Ibanez Signature Prototype (Larada first design appearance)
- Strandberg Made to Measure #17
- Abasi Guitars Prototypes
- Rick Toone's Sketch 7-string
- Abasi Guitars Emi

Abasi Guitars's Larada design was done uniquely by Abasi, despite having drawn lucid inspirations from instruments Tosin has played in the past. While the body shape is atypical, the rest of the design placed ergonomics above all. At least, the original Ibanez prototypes boasted a "teardrop" neck profile, in contrast to the more common C- and D-shaped profiles (and Ibanez's Wizard necks, which near a D-shape, though are much flatter and complement the difficulties that come with common hand motions on extended range guitars), fanned frets/ multi-scale neck, which are designed to complement the hand contortions required for fingering chords and larger stretches in addition to improving tonality, feel, and timbre for each string individually, and tighter string placement (id est, the gaps between the strings are smaller).

Abasi helped design and launch Kaizen model in 2022 in collaboration with Ernie Ball Music Man. The Kaizen is a multi-scale 6- or 7-string guitar with an “infinity radius” fingerboard and Heat Treated humbuckers, and an angular body designed by Abasi for ergonomic comfort.

==== Nylon acoustic-electric guitars ====
- Godin Multiac Nylon SA 6- and Encore 7- string models
- Kiesel NS1
- Abasi Guitars Prototype Nylon Acoustic-Electric

Nylon acoustic-electric guitars use a mix of technologies to modernize classical guitar construction with ergonomic and body design influences from the electric guitar. Roughly, they well mimic the tones and timbres of a traditional acoustic classical guitar though often feature a MIDI output and/ or a traditional audio jack to be plugged into some amplifying system, though mostly intended for "acoustic amplifiers," which find greater use for steel-string acoustic-electric guitars, popular in many genres.

==== Specialty instruments ====
The first two entries to this list are particularly interesting: used in at least "Physical Education" from The Joy of Motion and some of Weightless, while these are both 8-stringed guitars, they feature a modified neck and fretboard that allows for two "negative frets" for the lowest strings. That is, while the top 6-strings boast 24 frets each, the lowest strings boast 26. These are left tuned to C#1; the Blur is equipped with a capo specifically for those strings, which returns it to normal. A second, similar Made to Measure Strandberg was produced for Javier Reyes, which he still uses on tour for "Physical Education."

- Rick Toone's Blur
- Strandberg Made to Measure #8
- Ibanez RG9 9-string guitar

==== Pickups ====
Tosin Abasi has released two sets of signature pickups with DiMarzio and, later, Fishman, respectively. A set with Seymour Duncan was in the works before he switched to Fishman for their Fluence design. The DiMarzio were used in the TAM10 and TAM100; several sets of pickups went through the Prototype before Abasi's deal with Fishman. Now, all Abasi Guitars use the Tosin Abasi Fishman Fluence model, with the exception of the Space T Larada, meant to mimic the Fender Telecaster and so accordingly use Fishman's Greg Koch model pickups.

=== Amplifiers ===
Overall, Abasi has ebbed and flowed between digital and analog effects and amplifiers, often taking advantage of both. For most of the 2010s, Fractal Audio's AXE-FX II was central to his signal chain, though the final third of the decade saw him swap to leaning primarily on analog effects and amplifiers.

- Port City Amps
- Fractal Audio AXE-FX II, III
- Morgan Amplifiers

== Influences ==
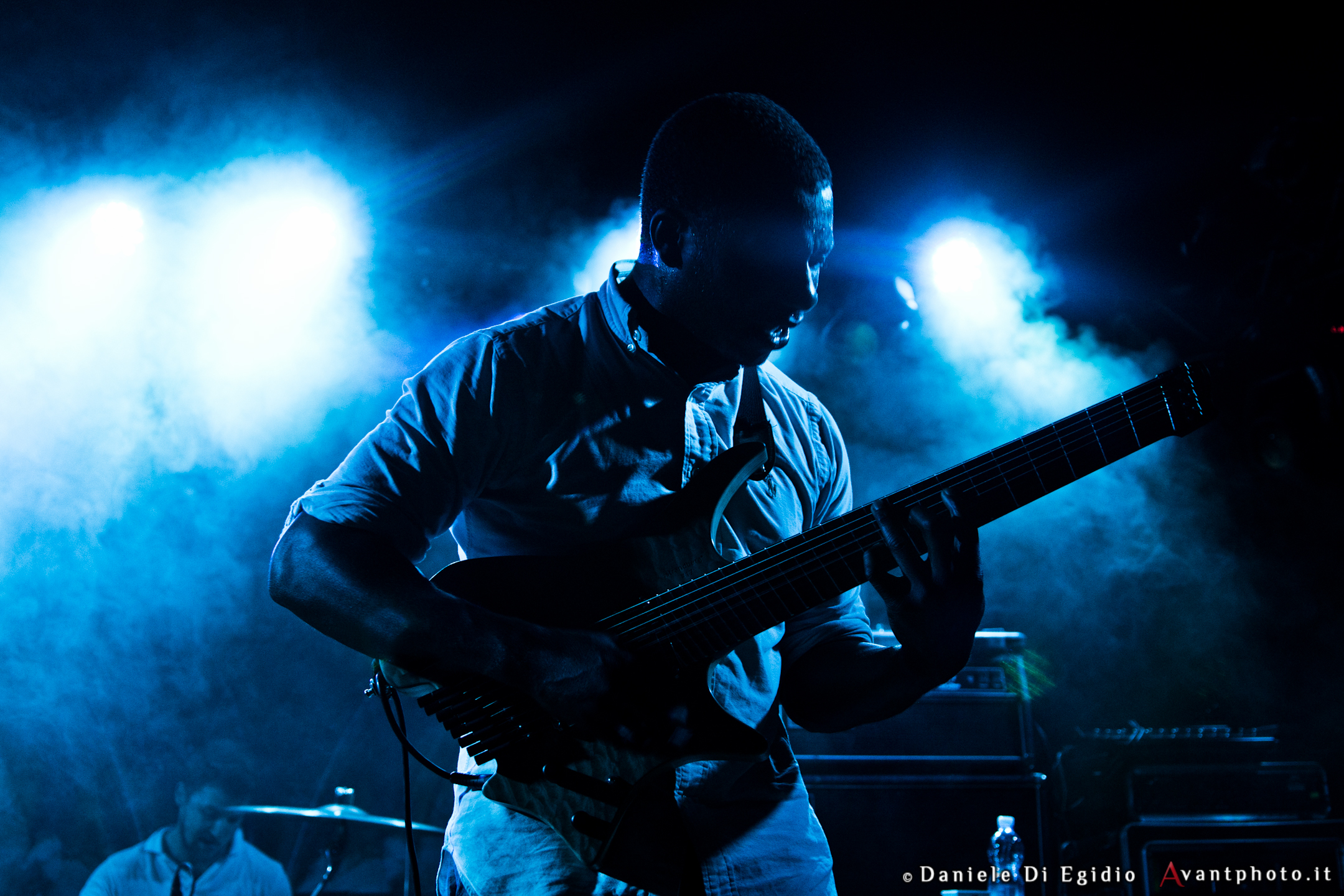
Abasi playing a Strandberg* Headless 8-string

His favored guitarists, musicians and bands include Steve Vai, Yngwie Malmsteen, Greg Howe, Allan Holdsworth, Fredrik Thordendal of Meshuggah, Thom Yorke of Radiohead, Kurt Rosenwinkel, Aphex Twin, Squarepusher, Mike Einziger of Incubus, and Dream Theater.

He is a Transcendental Meditation practitioner. He is also a car enthusiast, collecting cars and driving with Periphery guitarist Misha Mansoor.

== Discography ==
=== PSI (Pounds Per Square Inch) ===
- Virus (2001)

=== Reflux ===
- The Illusion of Democracy (2004)

=== Animals as Leaders ===
- Animals as Leaders (2009)
- "Wave of Babies (Digital Single)" (2010)
- Weightless (2011)
- The Joy of Motion (2014)
- Animals as Leaders Encore Edition (2015)
- The Madness of Many (2016)
- Parrhesia (2022)

=== T.R.A.M. ===
- Lingua Franca (Sumerian, 2012)

=== Tigran Hamasyan ===
- The Call Within (Guitars in "Vortex") (Nonesuch Records, 2020)
