= Animals as Leaders =

American instrumental progressive metal band

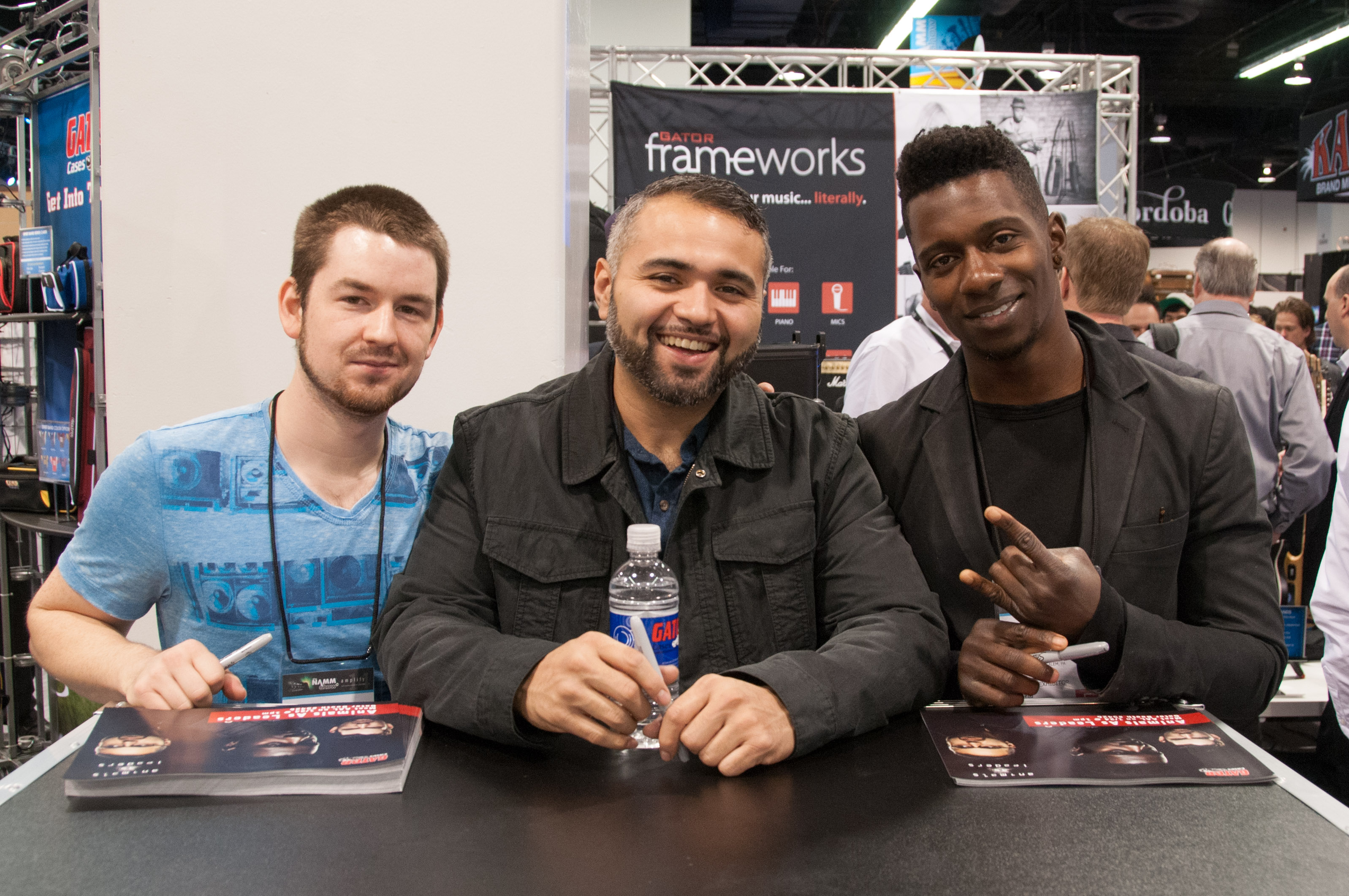
- Animals as Leaders in 2014; L–R: Matt Garstka, Javier Reyes, Tosin Abasi

Background information
- Origin: Washington D.C., U.S.
- Genres: Progressive metal; djent; instrumental rock; jazz fusion
- Years active: 2007–present
- Labels: Sumerian; Prosthetic
- Members: Tosin Abasi; Javier Reyes; Matt Garstka
- Past members: Chebon Littlefield; Matt Halpern; Navene Koperweis
- Website: animalsasleaders.org

Animals as Leaders is an American instrumental progressive metal band from Washington D.C. Since 2012, the band has consisted of Tosin Abasi (lead guitar), Javier Reyes (rhythm guitar), and Matt Garstka (drums), having originated in 2007 as a solo project by Abasi. They are a prominent band within the djent scene. Prosthetic Records released the band's eponymous debut album in 2009. They have since released the albums Weightless (2011), The Joy of Motion (2014), The Madness of Many (2016), and Parrhesia (2022).

== History ==
Animals as Leaders formed after guitarist Tosin Abasi's previous metalcore band, Reflux, disbanded. The heavy metal record label Prosthetic Records saw Abasi's guitar work and asked him to create a solo album for them. Abasi initially declined, feeling such an endeavor would be "...egotistical and unnecessary." Abasi decided to take a year off to study music, as he felt he was unable to reach his peak at guitar playing. After Abasi had completed his course, he took up the label on the offer of a solo project. The name Animals as Leaders was inspired by Daniel Quinn's 1992 novel Ishmael, which addresses anthropocentrism. Abasi coined the name as a reminder "that we're all essentially animals".

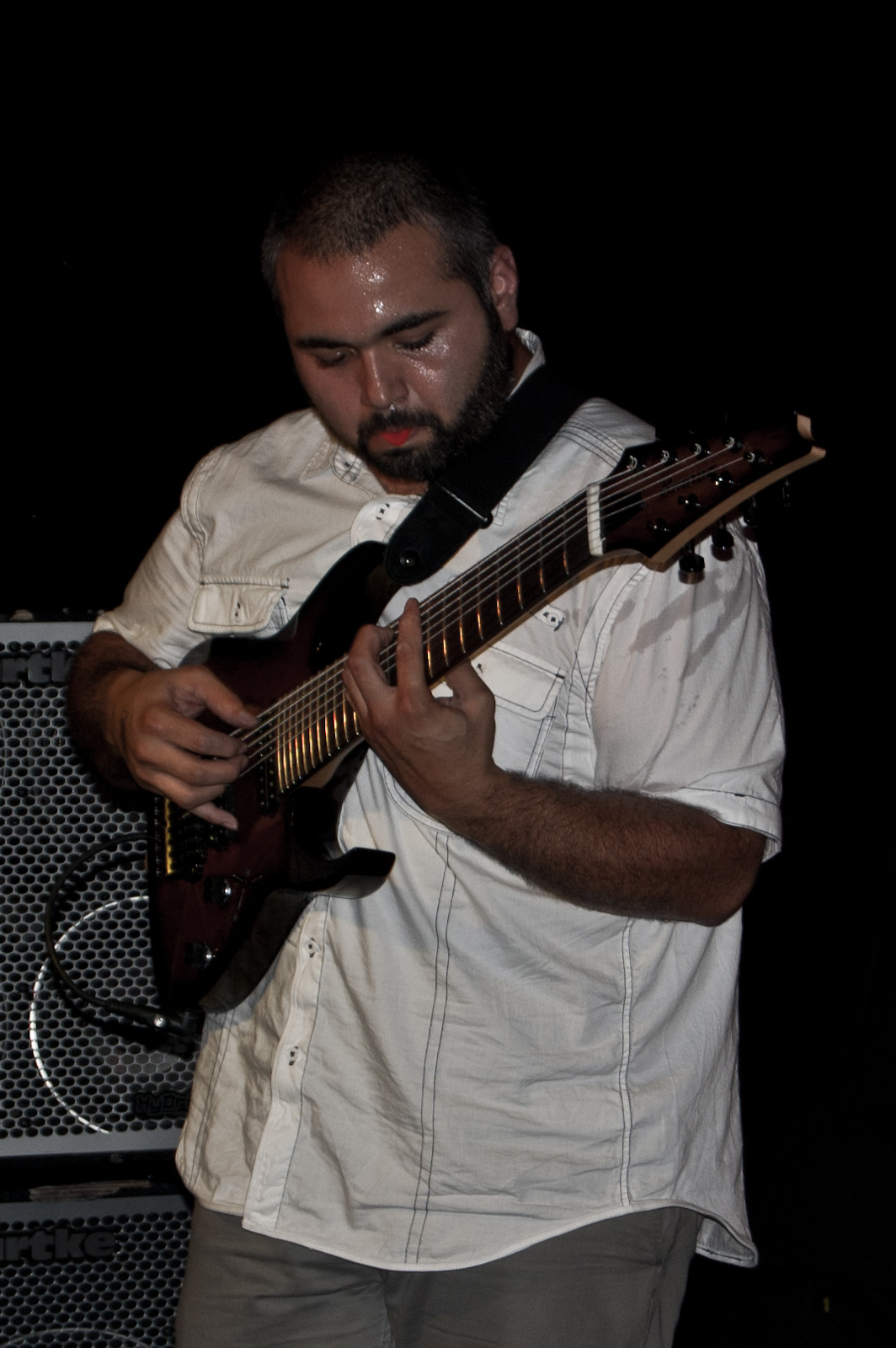
Javier Reyes playing guitar

The project's first album, Animals as Leaders, was recorded in early 2008. Abasi recorded most guitar and bass tracks on the album; a few guitar solos, drums and various synthesized effects were programmed by engineer Misha Mansoor of Periphery and Haunted Shores. The album was released on April 28, 2009, by Prosthetic Records.

In 2010, the band toured extensively, including the 2010 Summer Slaughter Tour with such acts as Decapitated, Vital Remains, Carnifex, The Faceless, All Shall Perish, The Red Chord, Cephalic Carnage, Veil of Maya, and Decrepit Birth and since Summer Slaughter has toured with more mainstream acts like Circa Survive and Dredg. They uploaded a non-album digital single called Wave of Babies to iTunes later that year.

The band embarked on a tour alongside Circa Survive, Dredg, and Codeseven from mid-2010 to early 2011, and in early 2011, toured alongside Underoath, Thursday, and A Skylit Drive to promote Underoath's latest release, Ø (Disambiguation).

On May 26, 2011, Animals as Leaders took part in a Red Cross benefit show titled "Josh Barnett Presents The Sun Forever Rising" at the House of Blues in West Hollywood, California. Shortly thereafter, they headlined their first tour, which included opening acts Intronaut, Dead Letter Circus, Last Chance to Reason, and Evan Brewer. On July 27, 2011, during a show at the Masquerade in Atlanta, Georgia, Tosin Abasi announced that they were recording the show for a live DVD.

The band was billed as the first support of Between the Buried and Me on their European tour in September 2011, also with the French band Doyle. That same year, as a follow-up to their self-titled album, the band released their LP, entitled Weightless, on November 8 in the United States, November 4 in Europe, and November 7 in the UK.

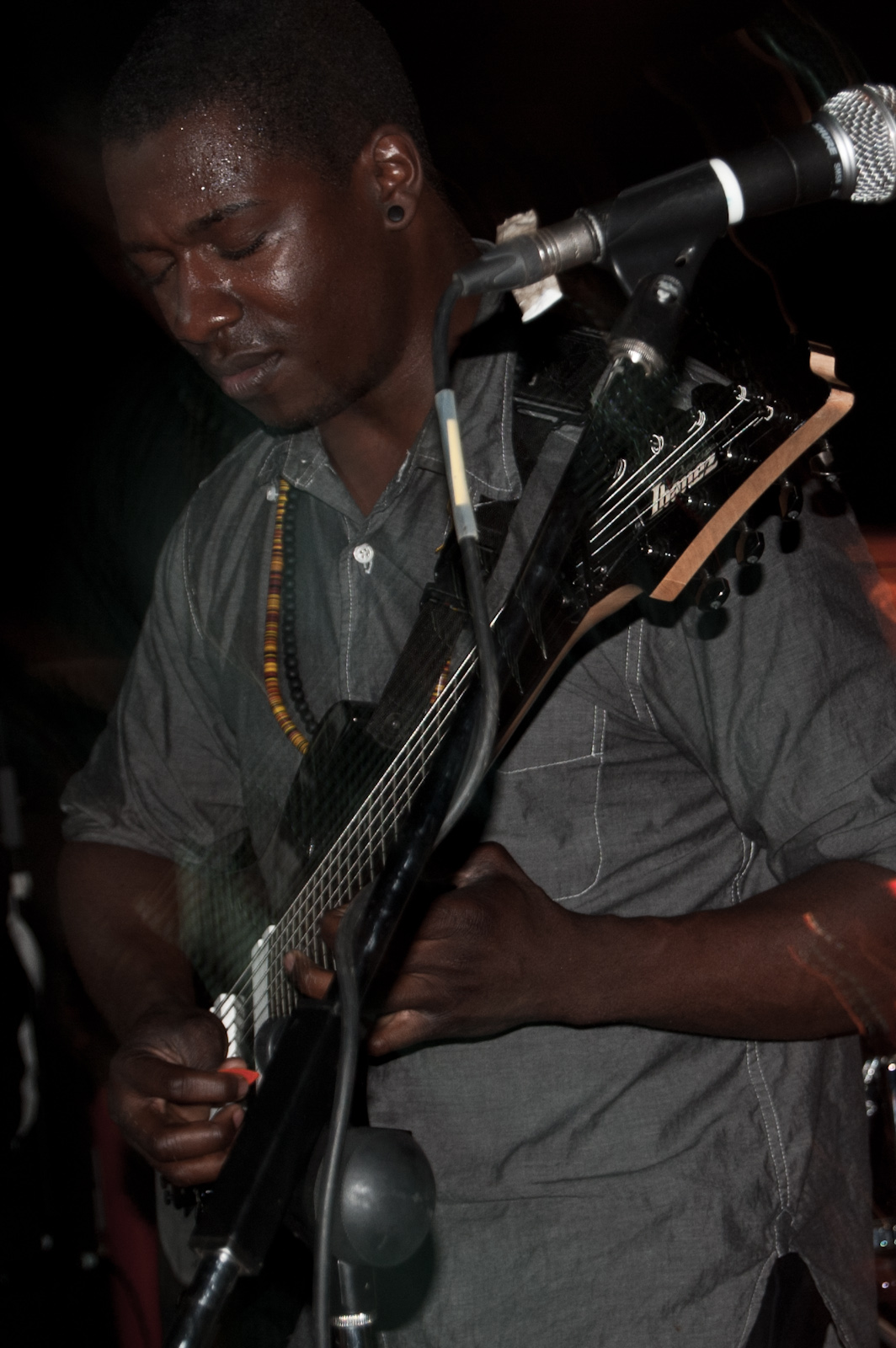
Tosin Abasi in 2011

In Spring 2012, Animals as Leaders embarked on a headlining tour of Europe, then returned to North America to open for Thrice. Navene Koperweis left Animals as Leaders that March. Prosthetic Records then announced on March 23 that drummer Matt Garstka would join them on tour.

"We see nothing but great potential with Matt, and look forward to performing with him on the upcoming tours," Abasi says. "We feel very excited for the future of AAL, which is brighter than ever. I'm beyond excited for our fans to hear some of the new music we already have brewing for the future!"

On November 28, 2012, Misha Mansoor, the producer for the first Animals as Leaders album, announced that he had begun writing riffs with Tosin Abasi, intending to start recording on their third album. Two days later, it was confirmed that Mansoor was recording the band after the completion of two songs. On February 14, 2014, the band announced their third studio album, The Joy of Motion, which was released via Sumerian Records on March 25, 2014.

On February 2, 2016, they revealed on Instagram that they were working on their fourth studio album. On September 22, they revealed that the album would be titled The Madness of Many, and would be released on November 11, 2016. On September 30, they released a single from the album, "The Brain Dance". On October 18, they released another song from the album, "Arithmophobia". This song features extensive use of odd-metered rhythm, hence its name.

On September 1, 2021, the band released "Monomyth" as a single. It was elected by Loudwire as the 20th-best metal song of 2021. American rapper and producer JPEGMafia sampled the single for the song "END CREDITS!" of the offline version of his album, LP!.

On November 18, 2021, the band announced their fifth studio album titled Parrhesia and released a single from the album, "The Problem of Other Minds." The album was released on March 25, 2022.

In a February 28, 2025 interview with Guitar World, Abasi said the band plans to begin pre-production of their new album. He stated he wants to spend a portion of the year writing the record, and hopefully recording it by the end of the year.

Animals as Leaders will support Steve Vai and Joe Satriani on their 2026 North American "SATCHVAI" tour.

In February 2026, the band was announced as part of the lineup for the Louder Than Life music festival in Louisville, scheduled to take place in September.

== Style ==
Animals as Leaders is a progressive metal band whose style draws from progressive rock, jazz fusion, funk, and electronica. Drummer Matt Garstka has called the band's style "metal fusion". They are a prominent band within the djent scene. The band is notable for the absence of a bass player, who is "replaced" by two eight-string guitarists.

== Band members ==
Abasi and Reyes are also members of the supergroup TRAM, alongside former Mars Volta wind instrumentalist Adrián Terrazas-González and Suicidal Tendencies drummer Eric Moore. Reyes also has his own side project, Mestis.

Current

- Tosin Abasi – lead guitar (2007–present), bass (studio sessions for “Animals as Leaders” and “Weightless”)
- Javier Reyes – rhythm guitar (2009–present), bass (studio sessions for “The Madness of Many”)
- Matt Garstka – drums (2012–present)

Former

- Chebon Littlefield – bass, keyboards (2007–2008)
- Matt Halpern – drums (2009)
- Navene Koperweis – drums, keyboards (2009–2012)

== Discography ==
=== Studio albums ===
List of albums, with selected chart positions
Title	Album details	Peak chart positions			Sales
Title	Album details	US	US Rock	US Hard Rock	Sales
Animals as Leaders	Released: April 28, 2009; Label: Prosthetic	—	—	—	
Weightless	Released: November 4, 2011; Label: Prosthetic	92	19	7	
The Joy of Motion	Released: March 24, 2014; Label: Sumerian	23	4	2	US: 50,000
The Madness of Many	Released: November 11, 2016; Label: Sumerian	56	6	1	
Parrhesia	Released: March 25, 2022; Label: Sumerian	—	—	—	
"—" denotes a recording that did not chart

=== Singles ===
- "Wave of Babies" (2010)
- "Arithmophobia" (2016)
- "The Brain Dance" (2016)
- "Monomyth" (2021)
- "The Problem of Other Minds" (2021)
- "Gordian Naught" (2022)

=== Re-releases ===
- "Animals as Leaders – Encore Edition" (2015)

=== Live albums ===
- "Animals as Leaders – Live 2017" (2018)

== Videography ==
Year	Title	Director
2010	"CAFO"	Scott Hansen
2011	"Isolated Incidents"	Jay Wynne
2012	"Weightless" (unreleased)	Scott Hansen
2014	"Lippincott"	Jay Wynne
2015	"Physical Education"	Cameron Alexander
2017	"Cognitive Contortions"	Randy Edwards
2021	"Monomyth"	Telavaya Reynolds
2021	"The Problem of Other Minds"	Telavaya Reynolds
2022	"Micro-Agressions"	Marie Alyse Rodriguez
2023	"Red Miso"	Nicolas Kadima
