= Clay Weiner =

American film director (born 1975)

- Born: 1975 (age 50–51); United States
- Occupations: Film director, film producer, writer

Clay Weiner is an American director and writer of commercials, film and television.

== Life and career ==
Weiner grew up in Shaker Heights, Ohio. Clay studied philosophy at Columbia University. During college, Clay began working with Robert Smigel (writer: Conan O'Brien, SNL) on The Dana Carvey Show. Weiner has now written for The Conan O'Brien Show, The Onion and is a contributor to Dazed & Confused, Vice, Flaunt and BlackBook.

Many know Clay as MTV's "Intro Guy." The campaign, which he wrote, directed and starred in, is rumored to be the inspiration for Napoleon's nerdy dance routine in the film Napoleon Dynamite. Weiner began his official advertising career as a writer at Cliff Freeman & Partners. He then went to work with David Droga at Publicis New York, Bartle Bogle Hegarty New York and Wieden+Kennedy Portland. As a creative, he won numerous awards from D&AD and One Show Pencils, to Cannes Gold Lions and Clio Awards. He has worked with agencies such as Wieden+Kennedy, Carmichael Lynch, DDB Worldwide, Cutwater, Droga5, 72&Sunny, Mother, Adam&Eve, Ground Zero and Goodby, Silverstein & Partners. Clay later launched an animated campaign for MTV called "Puberty," which he also wrote, designed and directed. In addition to MTV, Clay has directed commercial films for Ray-Ban, Bud Light, Subaru, Facebook, Uber, Amazon, ESPN, Sonic, Axe, Slim Jim, Vonage, Hyundai, Liquid Plumber, Kraft, Xbox and Snickers. His Bud Light "Dude" campaign has had over 100 million views

Clay's television directing credits include Fred: The Movie and Blue Mountain State. He has created short films such as the Emmy-nominated "The Christmas Tree," "Dad's New Girlfriend" and "Happy Father's Gay." The latter two were co-created with Gemini Award nominee, Jenna Wright.

Clay has written and produced two pilots for F/X and one for Adult Swim. He currently resides in New York City and Los Angeles.

=== Fred: The Movie ===
In 2010 Weiner's first feature, Fred: The Movie, was released by Nickelodeon. Fred is the first Hollywood feature to star a YouTube character, Fred Figglehorn. The character was created by Lucas Cruikshank and the screenplay was written by David A. Goodman, head writer of Family Guy. The film went on to be the highest watched TV movie of the year with a debut of 7.6 million views. It opened in the No. 8 spot, taking in £257,133 in the first week, despite being shown in over 243 cinemas.

=== Photography book ===
Weiner's photography book, TRY-ONs, was published in 2010. The book chronicles Weiner's exploration of identity as he personifies an eccentric array of real and imaginary characters. Designer and stylist Jenna Wright helped transform Clay into over 140 different people. The book won the 2011 D&AD Award for Photography.
