= Weightless (Animals as Leaders album) =

Studio album by Animals as Leaders
- Released: November 4, 2011
- Recorded: 2011
- Genres: Progressive metal; djent; instrumental rock
- Length: 46:29
- Label: Prosthetic
- Producer: Animals as Leaders

Animals as Leaders chronology
Animals as Leaders (2009)	Weightless (2011)	The Joy of Motion (2014)

Weightless is the second studio album by American instrumental progressive metal band Animals as Leaders. It was released on November 4, 2011 in Europe, November 7, 2011 in the UK, and November 8, 2011 in the US by Prosthetic Records. The album charted at No. 92 on Billboard’s Top 200 Chart, as well as No. 7 on Billboard’s Hard Rock Albums Chart, No. 16 on their Top Independent Album Chart and No. 50 on the Top Current Digital Album Chart.

Unlike the previous Animals as Leaders album, Weightless features a trio line-up instead of just consisting of Tosin Abasi along with featuring real drums in addition to programmed drums. Both guitarists in the group (Abasi and Javier Reyes) play 8-stringed guitars on this release.

The track titles of the album are chapter titles from the Rama series written by Arthur C. Clarke.

== Track listing ==
Professional ratings
Review scores
Source	Rating
AllMusic	3.5/5 stars
Chronicles of Chaos	7.5/10 stars

All tracks written by Animals as Leaders.

No.	Title	Length
1.	"An Infinite Regression"	3:25
2.	"Odessa"	4:14
3.	"Somnarium"	4:15
4.	"Earth Departure"	5:10
5.	"Isolated Incidents"	3:47
6.	"Do Not Go Gently"	3:41
7.	"New Eden"	2:40
8.	"Cylindrical Sea"	4:32
9.	"Espera"	2:13
10.	"To Lead You to an Overwhelming Question"	4:50
11.	"Weightless"	5:15
12.	"David"	2:27
Total length:		46:29

== Personnel ==
Animals as Leaders

- Tosin Abasi – lead guitar, bass
- Javier Reyes – rhythm guitar
- Navene Koperweis – drums, programming

Production

- Navene Koperweis – engineering
- Javier Reyes – mixing
- Dustin Miller – mastering
- Jay Wynne – artwork, design
