= Ash Avildsen =

American film director (born 1981)

- Born: Ashley Gregory Avildsen; November 5, 1981 (age 44); United States
- Occupations: Film director, screenwriter, producer
- Employer: Sumerian Records
- Works: American Satan; Paradise City; Queen of the Ring
- Parents: John G. Avildsen (father); Myroslawa Prystay (mother)

Ashley Gregory Avildsen (born November 5, 1981) is an American film director, screenwriter, producer, and the founder and CEO of Sumerian Records and Sumerian Films. The son of director John G. Avildsen, he wrote and directed the film American Satan (2017) and the scripted series Paradise City (2021).

== Reflux ==
Avildsen was the vocalist of metalcore band Reflux in the early 2000s, which also featured Tosin Abasi (Animals As Leaders) and Evan Brewer (Fallujah, formerly of The Faceless, Animosity and Entheos) co-founder John Mehoves and Stephen Clifford of Circa Survive. The band released one album "The Illusion of Democracy" via Prosthetic Records in 2004 and a self-titled EP in 2002 before breaking up in 2005.

== Sumerian Records ==
Sumerian Records (currently located in Nashville, TN) was founded in 2006 by Avildsen. Initially, the label was run out of his one-bedroom apartment in Venice Beach, beginning with the bands The Faceless and Stick to Your Guns. Sumerian has since released over 100 albums, expanded their roster to feature a diverse collective of over 40 artists, and in 2016 celebrated their 10-year anniversary as a successful independent label.

== Piracy controversy ==
On March 22, 2011, Avildsen released a video in which he argued against music piracy. This led to some controversy as the video was perceived to be an ad for Born of Osiris' then new record The Discovery. A second point was made of the fact that during the 1990s, Avildsen was active in the software piracy warez scene. He went by the nickname The Krazy Little Punk and from 1995 lead the games release group Release on Rampage (ROR), having gained infamy for repackaging a beta release of Quake and passing it off as the final retail release in a failed attempt to claim as being the first to illegally release the game.

In 2022, Jason Fisher of the heavy metal blog The Gauntlet and during the 1990s also a member of ROR, responded to the video, claiming that "Ash alone has easily cost companies millions of dollars." He lamented Avildsen's lack of disclosure on the matter.

== Filmography ==
=== Film ===
- What Now (2015)
- American Satan (2017)
- Queen of The Ring (2024)

=== Television ===
- Paradise City (2021)
- Hit Parader's No Cover (2022)

== Awards ==
- Women's Wrestling Hall of Fame
  - WWHOF Award (1 time)
    - Historian Award (2025)
