= List of djent bands =

This article is a list of notable bands and musical artists described as playing djent. Djent (/dʒɛnt/) is a subgenre of progressive metal, distinguished by a high-gain, distorted, palm-muted, low-pitch guitar sound. The name "djent" is an onomatopoeia of this sound.

== Artists ==
Band	Origin	Years active	References
After the Burial	United States	2004–present	
The Afterimage	Canada	2012–2018	
A Life Once Lost	United States	1999–2013	
Animals as Leaders	United States	2007–present	
Arch Echo	United States	2016–present	
Bad Wolves	United States	2017–present	
Born of Osiris	United States	2003–present	
Circle of Contempt	Finland	2006–present	
The Contortionist	United States	2007–present	
Cloudkicker	United States	2005–present	
Currents	United States	2011–present	
DVSR	Australia	2013–present	
Erra	United States	2009–present	
Fellsilent	United Kingdom	2003–2010	
Forevermore	United States	2009–present	
Hacktivist	United Kingdom	2011–present	
Humanity's Last Breath	Sweden	2009–present	
Intervals	Canada	2011–present	
Invent Animate	United States	2011–present	
Jinjer	Ukraine	2008–present	
The Korea	Russia	2003–present	
Mechina	United States	2004–present	
Meshuggah	Sweden	1987–present	
Monuments	United Kingdom	2007–present	
Northlane	Australia	2009–present	
Novelists	France	2013–present	
Periphery	United States	2005–present	
Polyphia (early)	United States	2010–present	
Reflections	United States	2010–present	
Rivers of Nihil (early)	United States	2009–present	
Scale the Summit	United States	2004–present	
Sirens	United States	2011–present	
Skyharbor	India	2010–present	
Sleep Token	United Kingdom	2016-present	
Spiritbox	Canada	2016–present	
Structures	Canada	2009–present	
Takatak	Pakistan	2009–present	
Tesseract	United Kingdom	2007–present	
Textures	Netherlands	2001–2017, 2023–present	
The Tony Danza Tapdance Extravaganza (later)	United States	2004–2012	
Uneven Structure	France	2008–present	
Unprocessed	German	2013–present	
Veil of Maya	United States	2004–present	
Vildhjarta	Sweden	2005–present	
Voices from the Fuselage	United Kingdom	2010–present	
Vola	Denmark	2006–present	
Volumes	United States	2009–present	
Within the Ruins	United States	2003–present	
Xerath	United Kingdom	2007–present	
