= Tomorrow We Die Alive =

Studio album by Born of Osiris
- Released: August 20, 2013
- Recorded: March–April 2013
- Genre: Progressive metalcore; djent
- Length: 42:26
- Label: Sumerian
- Producer: Nick Sampson; Born of Osiris

Born of Osiris chronology
The Discovery (2011)	Tomorrow We Die Alive (2013)	Soul Sphere (2015)

Singles from Tomorrow We Die Alive
- 1. "Machine" Released: June 25, 2013; 2. "Divergency" Released: August 5, 2013

Tomorrow We Die Alive (stylized as Tomorrow We Die ∆live) is the third studio album by American progressive metalcore band Born of Osiris. It was released through Sumerian Records on August 20, 2013.

The album debuted at 27 on the Billboard 200, selling 13,052 copies in the first week and has sold 51,000 copies as of October 2015.

== Critical reception ==
Professional ratings
Review scores
Source	Rating
Allmusic	2.5/5 stars
Alternative Press	3/5 stars
Sputnik Music	2/5 stars
Ultimate Guitar	6.8/10

The album has received mixed to positive reviews, with Allmusic saying that "the Chicago alt-metal sextet reins in their brand of extreme metalcore. Joey Buras' synthesized soundscapes play a bigger part on this release than on the more brutal last two outings, 2009's A Higher Place and 2011's The Discovery. Considering that the technical wizardry of the guitarists, bassist, and drummer were a huge draw for fans, pushing their instrumentation into the abyss of synthesized strings makes their wicked cacophony feel less jarring. Even so, the roar of lead vocalist Ronnie Canizaro adds a welcome, savage counterpoint to the melodic aspects of the album."

== Track listing ==
No.	Title	Length
1.	"Machine"	4:24
2.	"Divergency"	3:58
3.	"Mindful"	3:33
4.	"Exhilarate"	3:34
5.	"Absolution"	4:06
6.	"The Origin"	3:45
7.	"Aeon III"	3:56
8.	"Imaginary Condition"	3:13
9.	"Illusionist"	3:59
10.	"Source Field"	3:48
11.	"Vengeance"	4:10
Total length:		42:26

== Personnel ==
Credits for Tomorrow We Die Alive as listed on Allmusic:

Born of Osiris

- Ronnie Canizaro – lead vocals
- Lee McKinney – guitars
- David Da Rocha – bass
- Joe Buras – keyboards, vocals
- Cameron Losch – drums

Production and recording

- Nick Sampson – engineering, editing, orchestration, production, programming
- Lee McKinney – editing, engineering
- Joey Sturgis – mixing and mastering
- Jeff Dunne – drum editing
- Ash Avildsen – vocal production
- Shawn Keith – vocal production
- Allan Hessler – vocal engineering

Artwork and layout design

- Cameron Gray – artwork
- Amanda Fiore – booking
- Daniel McBride – layout design

Promoting

- Carl Severson – management
- George Vallee – publicity

== Charts ==
Chart (2011)	Peak position
US Billboard 200	27
US Billboard Independent Albums	8
US Billboard Rock Albums	10
US Billboard Hard Rock Albums	3
