= The Eternal Reign =

EP by Born of Osiris
- Released: February 24, 2017
- Genre: Technical death metal, deathcore
- Length: 23:50
- Label: Sumerian
- Producer: Nick Sampson

Born of Osiris chronology
Soul Sphere (2015)	The Eternal Reign (2017)	The Simulation (2019)

Professional ratings
Review scores
Source	Rating
AllMusic	4/5 stars

The Eternal Reign is the second EP by American progressive metalcore band Born of Osiris. It is an entire re-recording of their 2007 EP, The New Reign, and includes one new song, "Glorious Day", originally intended for the 2007 release. An original, rough demo of that song can be found on the 2004 EP, Youm Wara Youm. The Eternal Reign was released on February 24, 2017 through Sumerian Records as a 10-year celebration of the release of The New Reign. This is the last album to feature bassist David Da Rocha.

== Track listing ==
No.	Title	Length
1.	"Rosecrance"	2:11
2.	"Empires Erased"	3:25
3.	"Open Arms to Damnation"	2:38
4.	"Abstract Art"	3:15
5.	"The New Reign"	2:20
6.	"Brace Legs"	2:28
7.	"Bow Down"	2:01
8.	"The Takeover"	3:03
9.	"Glorious Day"	2:29
Total length:		23:50

== Personnel ==
- Ronnie Canizaro – lead vocals
- Joe Buras – keyboards, backing vocals, synthesizer, programming, clean vocals on "Empires Erased"
- Lee McKinney – guitars
- David Darocha – bass
- Cameron Losch – drums

Production and recording

- Nick Sampson – engineering, mastering, mixing, producer
- Max Klein – assistant engineering
