= False Idol (album) =

2017 studio album by Veil of Maya

Studio album by Veil of Maya
- Released: October 20, 2017
- Genre: Metalcore; djent; progressive metal
- Length: 44:05
- Label: Sumerian
- Producer: Max Schad; Brandon Paddock

Veil of Maya chronology
Matriarch (2015)	False Idol (2017)	[m]other (2023)

Singles from False Idol
- 1. "Overthrow" Released: September 13, 2017; 2. "Doublespeak" Released: October 4, 2017

Professional ratings
Review scores
Source	Rating
Distorted Sound	7/10
Metal Hammer	3.5/5 stars
Rock Revolt	4/5 stars

False Idol is the sixth studio album by American metalcore band Veil of Maya, released on October 20, 2017, through Sumerian Records. The instrumental parts of the album were produced by Max Schad, while vocal parts were produced by Brandon Paddock.

== Track listing ==
No.	Title	Length
1.	"Lull" (instrumental)	0:37
2.	"Fracture"	3:14
3.	"Doublespeak"	4:12
4.	"Overthrow"	3:55
5.	"Whistleblower"	3:27
6.	"Echo Chamber"	4:10
7.	"Pool Spray"	3:29
8.	"Graymail"	3:42
9.	"Manichee"	3:12
10.	"Citadel"	3:41
11.	"Follow Me"	3:26
12.	"Tyrant"	2:48
13.	"Livestream"	4:05
Total length:		44:05

== Personnel ==
=== Veil of Maya ===
- Lukas Magyar – vocals
- Marc Okubo – guitars, programming
- Danny Hauser – bass
- Sam Applebaum – drums

=== Crew ===
- Max Schad – production (instruments)
- Brandon Paddock – production (vocals)
- Colin Sinclair – art and design
- Daniel Braunstein – mastering

== Charts ==
Chart (2017)	Peak position
New Zealand Heatseeker Albums (RMNZ)	7
US Billboard 200	67
US Independent Albums (Billboard)	5
US Top Hard Rock Albums (Billboard)	3
US Top Rock Albums (Billboard)	8
