= Eclipse (Veil of Maya album) =

Studio album by Veil of Maya
- Released: February 28, 2012
- Studio: Bulb's Bedroom Studios
- Genres: Deathcore; djent
- Length: 28:21
- Label: Sumerian
- Producer: Misha Mansoor

Veil of Maya chronology
Id (2010)	Eclipse (2012)	Matriarch (2015)

Singles from Eclipse
- 1. "Vicious Circles" Released: January 17, 2012

Professional ratings
Review scores
Source	Rating
Allmusic	4/5 stars
Metal Injection	7.5/10

Eclipse is the fourth studio album by American metalcore band Veil of Maya. It was released on February 28, 2012, and is the band's shortest album to date, clocking in at only 28 minutes. Eclipse was co-written and produced by Misha "Bulb" Mansoor, who is the guitarist of the Maryland-based metal band Periphery. It is the first record by the band to feature bassist Danny Hauser and the last with vocalist Brandon Butler.

== Culture references ==
The song title "Winter Is Coming Soon" is a reference to the television series Game of Thrones.

The track "Punisher" has gained notoriety on the Internet due to a sample which was placed within the song at 2:03, of which is an excerpt of audio taken from a YouTube video called "Periphery Sucks" where a young man criticizes djent and the band Periphery, in which album producer Misha Mansoor plays guitar.

== Inspiration ==
A paragraph inside the physical version of the album talks about the inspiration of Eclipse. According to it, the band met a woman while touring in Italy who was blind throughout half of her life, and had her vision restored by staring directly into a solar eclipse. The paragraph goes on to say that "there is much more to the magnitude and magnificence of a solar eclipse than meets the eye." Guitarist Marc Okubo has also talked in a Guitar Messenger interview about this story as the underlying theme of the album.

== Track listing ==
All tracks are written by Butler, Misha Mansoor and Veil of Maya

No.	Title	Length
1.	"20/200" (instrumental)	1:16
2.	"Divide Paths"	2:49
3.	"Punisher"	2:33
4.	"Winter Is Coming Soon"	2:12
5.	"The Glass Slide"	3:32
6.	"Enter My Dreams"	2:54
7.	"Numerical Scheme"	3:18
8.	"Vicious Circles"	3:18
9.	"Eclipse" (instrumental)	2:24
10.	"With Passion and Power"	4:05
Total length:		28:20

== Personnel ==
Veil of Maya

- Brandon Butler – vocals
- Marc Okubo – guitars
- Danny Hauser – bass guitar
- Sam Applebaum – drums

Production

- Misha Mansoor – producer, recording, mixing, mastering
- Michael Keene – vocal production
- Daniel McBride – artwork
