= Mother (Veil of Maya album) =

[m]other

Studio album by Veil of Maya
- Released: May 12, 2023
- Genre: Metalcore; progressive metal; djent; experimental metal
- Length: 35:13
- Label: Sumerian
- Producer: Zach Jones

Veil of Maya chronology
False Idol (2017)	[m]other (2023)

Singles from [m]other
- 1. "Synthwave Vegan" Released: April 20, 2022; 2. "Godhead" Released: February 8, 2023; 3. "Red Fur" Released: March 8, 2023; 4. "Mother, Pt. 4" Released: April 12, 2023

Mother (stylized as [m]other) is the seventh studio album by American metalcore band Veil of Maya, and their last before going on hiatus. The album was released on May 12, 2023, through Sumerian Records and was produced by Zach Jones.

== Background and promotion ==
On July 24, 2019, Veil of Maya's follow-up to their 2017 album False Idol appeared to be in production with the band sharing various photos from the studio with producer Taylor Larson on their social media. On October 30, the band have returned to the studio for their new album and began initial sessions on the effort with producer Taylor Larson. According to their social media, those sessions have resumed with Larson back behind the boards.

On October 8, 2021, the group's guitarist Marc Okubo revealed that the reason for the relative delay of their new record comes from the band having decided to scrap much of what they had previously recorded for it. On April 20, 2022, Veil of Maya released the first single "Synthwave Vegan". On September 14, the band completed tracking the effort and have begun mixing the album with new material.

On February 8, 2023, Veil of Maya unveiled the second single "Godhead" and its corresponding music video. On March 8, the band published the third single "Red Fur" and an accompanying music video. At the same time, they officially announced the album itself and release date, whilst also revealing the album cover and the track list. On April 12, one month before the album release, the band published the fourth single "Mother, Pt. 4" along with a music video. The music video for "Disco Kill Party" was released May 12, 2023, coinciding with the album release.

== Critical reception ==
Professional ratings
Review scores
Source	Rating
Blabbermouth.net	7/10
Distorted Sound	9/10
Wall of Sound AU.com	7/10

The album received generally positive reviews from critics. Dom Lawson from Blabbermouth.net gave the album 7 out of 10 and said: "Veil of Maya are plainly incapable of repeating themselves, and Mother marks another confident step forward, with their admirable disregard for convention as an extra selling point." Dan McHugh of Distorted Sound scored the album 9 out of 10 and said: "Mother is one hell of a journey and is Veil of Maya at their most laser focused. Boundless creativity and jaw-dropping technicality are made to look effortless as the innovative quartet have undeniably constructed their finest work to date. It's scary the sheer amount of artistry that has been crammed into this 36-minute beast. A surefire contender for the top rankings at the end of the year."

Wall of Sound AU.com gave the album a score 7/10 and saying: "Veil of Maya came into the journey of Mother with a curiosity to explore, and be creative. It's admirable for a band with a tenure of over a decade, striving to find new paths to pursue, instead of resting on their laurels, rinsing and repeating the same breakdowns in the name of safe nostalgia. Their combination of ethereal electronics and death metal creates true moments of triumph, where the sounds of a synth lull you to relaxation before Magyar's growls and Okubo's guitar crunches slice you the hell up. The wrong turns this album takes sometimes can be a little jarring, but even they indicate a band that has so much more left in the tank. Mother is a preview of the exciting terrain Veil of Maya look to continue exploring in the future and a welcome reminder of veterans who have no plans on stopping anytime soon, articulated through a pretty damn solid album."

== Track listing ==
Mother track listing
No.	Title	Length
1.	"Tokyo Chainsaw"	2:57
2.	"Artificial Dose"	3:25
3.	"Godhead"	3:12
4.	"[re]connect"	4:02
5.	"Red Fur"	3:31
6.	"Disco Kill Party"	3:09
7.	"Mother, Pt. 4"	5:12
8.	"Synthwave Vegan"	2:45
9.	"Lost Creator"	3:24
10.	"Death Runner"	3:36
Total length:		35:13

== Personnel ==
Credits adapted from album's liner notes.

Veil of Maya

- Lukas Magyar – vocals
- Marc Okubo – guitars, programming
- Danny Hauser – bass
- Sam Applebaum – drums

Additional personnel

- Zach Jones – production
- Jordon Beal – drum production, engineering
