= Angel or Alien =

Studio album by Born of Osiris
- Released: July 2, 2021
- Recorded: 2021
- Genre: Progressive metalcore; symphonic metal; djent
- Length: 55:00
- Label: Sumerian
- Producer: Josh Strock, Lee McKinney, Nick Rossi

Born of Osiris chronology
The Simulation (2019)	Angel or Alien (2021)	Through Shadows (2025)

Singles from Angel or Alien
- 1. "White Nile" Released: March 17, 2021; 2. "Angel or Alien" Released: May 13, 2021; 3. "Poster Child" Released: July 1, 2021

Professional ratings
Review scores
Source	Rating
Kerrang!	3/5 stars

Angel or Alien is the sixth studio album by American progressive metalcore band Born of Osiris, released on July 2, 2021 through Sumerian Records. In March 2021, the ensemble released a lyric video for "White Nile", the first single from the album, along with a playthrough video released in May. Also in May, "Angel or Alien", the second single from the album, was released, and announced the release of the album for July 2, 2021.

== Track listing ==
No.	Title	Length
1.	"Poster Child"	4:36
2.	"White Nile"	3:49
3.	"Angel or Alien"	4:27
4.	"Waves"	3:08
5.	"Oathbreaker"	3:45
6.	"Threat of Your Presence"	3:36
7.	"Love Story"	4:23
8.	"Crossface"	4:27
9.	"Echobreather"	3:36
10.	"Lost Souls"	3:27
11.	"In for the Kill"	3:51
12.	"You Are the Narrative"	3:24
13.	"Truth and Denial"	3:42
14.	"Shadowmourne"	4:44
Total length:		55:00

== Personnel ==
Born of Osiris

- Ronnie Canizaro – lead vocals
- Lee McKinney – lead guitar
- Nick Rossi – rhythm guitar, bass
- Joe Buras – keyboards, backing vocals
- Cameron Losch – drums

Production and recording

- Josh Strock – production, vocal engineering
- Matt Dierkes – drum engineering
- Lee McKinney – production, guitar and bass engineering
- Nick Rossi – production, guitar and bass engineering
- Nick Sampson – engineering (tracks 8, 11, 12, 13)
- Jeff Dunne – mixing, mastering

== Charts ==
Chart performance for Angel or Alien
Chart (2021)	Peak position
UK Independent Albums (OCC)	47
UK Rock & Metal Albums (OCC)	18
