= Through Shadows =

Studio album by Born of Osiris
- Released: July 11, 2025
- Recorded: 2023–2024
- Genre: Progressive metalcore; djent
- Length: 48:29
- Label: Sumerian
- Producer: Born of Osiris, KJ Strock

Born of Osiris chronology
Angel or Alien (2021)	Through Shadows (2025)

Singles from Through Shadows
- 1. "Torchbearer" Released: August 16, 2023; 2. "A Mind Short Circuiting" Released: February 29, 2024; 3. "Elevate" Released: April 24, 2024; 4. "In Desolation" Released: August 15, 2024; 5. "Through Shadows" Released: May 14, 2025; 6. "The War That You Are" Released: July 11, 2025

Professional ratings
Review scores
Source	Rating
Blabbermouth.net	8/10
Boolin Tunes	7/10
Chaoszine	4.5/5 stars
Ever Metal	8/10
MetalSucks	4/5 stars

Through Shadows is the seventh studio album by American progressive metalcore band Born of Osiris, released on July 11, 2025 through Sumerian Records. It is the band's first album without longtime keyboardist Joe Buras, though he performed on three of the album's singles before he left. It is also their final album with longtime guitarist Lee McKinney.

== Background ==
On August 16, 2023, the band released a new single, "Torchbearer," followed by "A Mind Short Circuiting" on February 29, 2024.

On March 1, 2024, longtime keyboardist and vocalist Joe Buras announced his departure from the band, citing personal growth and aspirations as his reasons for leaving. On April 24, 2024, the band released another single, "Elevate."

On August 15, 2024, the band released a visualizer video for "In Desolation," the fourth single from their upcoming album. On May 14, 2025, "Through Shadows," the fifth single from the album, was released, and the band announced the release of the album for July 19, 2025. The band released a visualizer video for "The War That You Are" on the day of the album's release.

== Track listing ==
No.	Title	Length
1.	"Seppuku"	3:19
2.	"Elevate"	3:13
3.	"Through Shadows"	5:08
4.	"The War That You Are"	3:45
5.	"Inverno"	3:36
6.	"A Mind Short Circuiting"	4:23
7.	"Burning Light"	2:12
8.	"In Desolation"	3:36
9.	"Torchbearer"	3:27
10.	"Activated" (feat. Spencer Chamberlain of Underoath)	3:35
11.	"Dark Fable"	3:24
12.	"Transcendence"	4:21
13.	"Blackwater"	4:28
Total length:		48:27

== Personnel ==
Credits adapted from the album's liner notes.

=== Born of Osiris ===
- Ronnie Canizaro – lead vocals
- Lee McKinney – lead guitar, backing vocals
- Nick Rossi – rhythm guitar, bass, keyboards, synthesizers
- Cameron Losch – drums

=== Additional contributors ===
- Born of Osiris – production, engineering
- Zach Jones – mixing, mastering, engineering
- KJ Strock – additional production
- Joe Buras – keyboards on "Elevate," "A Mind Short Circuiting," and "Torchbearer;" clean vocals on "Elevate"
- Spencer Chamberlain – guest vocals on "Activated"
- Chris Ollis – guest saxophone on "Activated"
- Ninja Jo – album artwork
- Shawn Keith – art direction
- Daniel McBride – art direction, layout
