= The Simulation =

Studio album by Born of Osiris
- Released: January 11, 2019
- Recorded: 2018
- Genre: Progressive metalcore; djent
- Length: 25:40
- Label: Sumerian
- Producer: Born of Osiris

Born of Osiris chronology
| The Eternal Reign (2017) | The Simulation (2019) | Angel or Alien (2021) |

Singles from The Simulation
- 1. "Silence the Echo" Released: July 16, 2018; 2. "The Accursed" Released: November 16, 2018

Professional ratings
Review scores
| Source | Rating |
|---|---|
| AllMusic | 4/5 stars |

The Simulation is the fifth studio album by American progressive metalcore band Born of Osiris, released on January 11, 2019, through Sumerian Records. It was originally announced as the first of two Born of Osiris albums planned for release in 2019, though the second album remained unreleased for the rest of that year, later expanded into their 2021 album Angel or Alien. In July 2018, the ensemble released a lyric video for "Silence the Echo", the first single from the album. In November 2018 "The Accursed", the second single from the album, was released.

== Track listing ==
| No. | Title | Length |
|---|---|---|
| 1. | "The Accursed" | 3:26 |
| 2. | "Disconnectome" | 3:18 |
| 3. | "Cycles of Tragedy" | 3:10 |
| 4. | "Under the Gun" | 3:35 |
| 5. | "Recursion" | 0:53 |
| 6. | "Analogs in a Cell" | 2:56 |
| 7. | "Silence the Echo" | 4:30 |
| 8. | "One Without the Other" | 3:52 |
| Total length: | | 25:40 |

== Personnel ==
Born of Osiris

- Ronnie Canizaro – lead vocals
- Lee McKinney – guitars
- Nick Rossi – bass
- Joe Buras – keyboards, vocals
- Cameron Losch – drums

Additional personnel

- Born of Osiris – production
- Joe Buras – keyboards and effects engineering
- Cameron Losch – keyboards and effects engineering
- Lee McKinney – instrument engineering, instrument tracking, instrument editing, keyboards and effects engineering
- Nick Sampson – mastering, mixing, vocal engineering
- Allan Hessler – vocal engineering
- Max Klein – vocal editing, additional engineering
- Maskarade – album artwork
- Daniel McBride – art direction, layout, additional art
- Ash Avildsen – additional vocal production (tracks 1, 3)
- Nick Walters – additional vocal production (tracks 1, 3)
