= The Common Man's Collapse =

Studio album by Veil of Maya
- Released: April 1, 2008
- Recorded: 2008
- Studios: Keene Machine Studios, North Hollywood, California
- Genre: Deathcore
- Length: 33:15
- Label: Sumerian
- Producer: Michael Keene

Veil of Maya chronology
All Things Set Aside (2006)	The Common Man's Collapse (2008)	Id (2010)

Professional ratings
Review scores
Source	Rating
Lambgoat	4/10

The Common Man's Collapse is the second studio album by American metalcore band Veil of Maya. The album was produced by Michael Keene of The Faceless and was released through Sumerian Records on April 1, 2008.

The songs "Entry Level Exit Wounds" and "Sever the Voices" were re-recorded from the first album, All Things Set Aside, and the song "It's Torn Away" is a re-recording of the song "Aim For the Head" from the band's 2005 demo with some changes such as completely different lyrics and some different riffs. It is the first album by the band to include vocalist Brandon Butler and last with bassist Kristopher "The Higler" Hilger.

In 2021, Alternative Press included the album in his list of "30 deathcore albums from the 2000s that define the genre". In 2025, Loudwire named it one of the best deathcore albums of the 2000s, saying it was "a leader among djenty deathcore albums of the time."

== Track listing ==
No.	Title	Length
1.	"Wounds" (intro)	1:03
2.	"Crawl Back"	4:02
3.	"Mark the Lines"	3:57
4.	"It's Not Safe to Swim Today"	2:43
5.	"Entry Level Exit Wounds"	2:51
6.	"Pillars" (instrumental)	2:09
7.	"We Bow in Its Aura"	3:47
8.	"All Eyes Look Ahead"	2:30
9.	"Sever the Voices"	5:05
10.	"It's Torn Away"	5:01
Total length:		33:15

== Personnel ==
Veil of Maya

- Brandon Butler - vocals
- Marc Okubo - guitars
- Kristopher "The Higler" Hilger - bass guitar
- Sam Applebaum - drums

Production

- Produced by Michael Keene of The Faceless
