= Soul Sphere =

Studio album by Born of Osiris
- Released: October 23, 2015
- Recorded: 2015
- Genre: Progressive metalcore; djent
- Length: 46:43
- Label: Sumerian
- Producer: Nick Sampson; Born of Osiris

Born of Osiris chronology
Tomorrow We Die Alive (2013)	Soul Sphere (2015)	The Eternal Reign (2017)

Singles from Soul Sphere
- 1. "Throw Me in the Jungle" Released: July 29, 2015; 2. "Resilience" Released: September 10, 2015

Soul Sphere is the fourth studio album by American progressive metalcore band Born of Osiris. The album was released on October 23, 2015 through Sumerian Records.

== Critical reception ==
Professional ratings
Review scores
Source	Rating
Exclaim!	5/10
Impericon	74%
MetalSucks	3.5/5 stars

In a critical review for Exclaim!, Calum Slingerland wrote that Soul Sphere was closer to capturing the band's prior virtuosic pursuits than Tomorrow We Die ∆live, though he further criticized the EDM influence and below-average lyricism.

== Track listing ==
No.	Title	Length
1.	"The Other Half of Me"	3:32
2.	"Throw Me in the Jungle"	3:36
3.	"Free Fall"	4:09
4.	"Illuminate"	4:45
5.	"The Sleeping and the Dead"	3:42
6.	"Tidebinder"	4:21
7.	"Resilience"	3:50
8.	"Goddess of the Dawn"	3:23
9.	"The Louder the Sound, the More We All Believe"	3:27
10.	"Warlords"	4:09
11.	"River of Time"	3:22
12.	"The Composer"	4:28
Total length:		46:43

== Personnel ==
- Ronnie Canizaro – lead vocals
- Lee McKinney – guitars
- David Da Rocha – bass
- Joe Buras – keyboards, vocals
- Cameron Losch – drums

== Charts ==
Chart (2015)	Peak position
US Billboard 200	67
