= Rareform =

Studio album by After the Burial
- Released: July 22, 2008
- Recorded: 2008
- Studio: Spectre Studios, Seattle, Washington
- Genre: Progressive metal; djent; deathcore
- Length: 35:31
- Label: Sumerian
- Producer: Trent Hafdahl; Justin Lowe

After the Burial chronology
Forging a Future Self (2006)	Rareform (2008)	In Dreams (2010)

Reissue album cover
- Artwork used for the 2009 reissue cover

Rareform is the second studio album by American progressive metalcore band After the Burial. It was released on July 22, 2008, through Sumerian Records.

In September 2018, After the Burial began a 10-year anniversary tour with The Acacia Strain, Erra, and Make Them Suffer, where After the Burial played the record in full.

== Reissue ==
On September 15, 2009, the band released a re-mixed and re-mastered version of Rareform with alternative artwork and bonus features. The vocals on the reissue were re-recorded with the band's current vocalist, Anthony Notormaso (in contrast to Grant Luoma, who performed lead vocals for the original version of Rareform). Contrary to popular belief, the drums were not actually re-recorded by Dan Carle live and were still programmed for the reissue of the album, albeit remixed extensively. Both editions of the album were produced by the band's rhythm guitarist, Justin Lowe.

Professional ratings
Review scores
Source	Rating
AllMusic	favorable

Reissue
Review scores
Source	Rating
AbsolutePunk	8.4/10

== Track listing ==
All tracks are written by Grant Luoma, Trent Hafdahl, Justin Lowe, and Lerichard "Lee" Foral.

No.	Title	Length
1.	"Berzerker"	5:40
2.	"Drifts" (featuring Alex Haza)	4:09
3.	"Cursing Akhenaten" (featuring Matthew Downs)	4:03
4.	"Rareform"	3:03
5.	"Aspiration"	4:40
6.	"The Fractal Effect"	3:50
7.	"Ometh"	4:15
8.	"A Vicious Reforming of Features"	5:51
Total length:		35:31

== Personnel ==
After the Burial

- Trent Hafdahl – lead guitar, backing vocals, production, engineering
- Justin Lowe – rhythm guitar, drums, programming, production, mixing
- Lerichard "Lee" Foral – bass
- Grant Luoma – lead vocals (original release)
- Anthony Notarmaso – lead vocals (2009 reissue version)

Additional musicians

- Alex Haza – guest vocals on track 2
- Matthew Downs – guest vocals on track 3

Additional personnel

- Mark Softich – mixing, mastering
- Shawn Keith – A&R
- Damagework – artwork
