= The Discovery (album) =

Studio album by Born of Osiris
- Released: March 22, 2011
- Recorded: October 2010
- Genres: Deathcore; djent; progressive metal
- Length: 52:57
- Label: Sumerian
- Producer: Born of Osiris

Born of Osiris chronology
A Higher Place (2009)	The Discovery (2011)	Tomorrow We Die Alive (2013)

Singles from The Discovery
- 1. "Follow The Signs" Released: February 1, 2011; 2. "Two Worlds of Design" Released: March 14, 2011; 3. "Recreate" Released: March 22, 2011

The Discovery is the second studio album by American progressive metalcore band Born of Osiris. It was released through Sumerian Records on March 22, 2011. It is also the first Born of Osiris record to make use of seven string guitars, and was produced solely by members of the band. Early demo versions of some of the album's songs were produced and mixed by Misha Mansoor, but the final retail release was mixed by Jason Suecof.

The Discovery is the only release by the band to feature guitarist Jason Richardson as he would later get fired from the group in December 2011. Most of the album's solos were written and performed by Richardson. The album debuted at #87 on the Billboard 200, selling roughly 6,400 copies in its first week.

== Background ==
On September 27, 2010, the band announced its plans to release a new track, "Follow The Signs," as a digital single via iTunes on October 5, however, those plans were scrapped.

On October 5, 2010, the band released a webisode sharing that they'd begun recording a new album for an early 2011 release date. The band shared that they themselves were overseeing the production duties alongside Don Byczynski, who would also provide engineering duties, at BOTA Studio. On October 11, 2010, the band released a second studio update video.

On October 14, McKinney provided an update on the progress the band had made recording the album; sharing that the band had adopted Seven-string guitars, brought back the "BOO-bounce," and were recording the heaviest album the band had made yet. McKinney complimented new guitarist Richardson for "increasing the amount of shred" on the record. McKinney also shared that the album was being recorded at Bota Studios and that Brandon Paddock (John Feldman's engineer) would be providing mixing duties.

In July 2010, the band posted a teaser to their MySpace profile, containing clips of three new songs. In December 2010, the band shared that Jason Suecof would be providing mixing duties at Audiohammer Studios.

On January 20, 2011, the band announced that their upcoming album would be titled "The Discovery" and that a release date of March 22, 2011 had been chosen.

At the end of January, the band shared that they planned to release the new track "Follow The Signs" as a digital single via iTunes on Tuesday, February 1. The track had initially been slated for an October release, but those plans were subsequently scrapped. The track was subsequently released as a single via the band's Facebook profile. Lee McKinney explained that the track had been recorded a few different times; once as a demo with Misha Mansoor of Periphery, and once again for "The Discovery," which had a different structure. The track, as well as the album, were recorded at BOTA Studio in Lake in the Hills, Illinois and was mixed by Jason Suecof. Mid-February, the band released the cover art of the upcoming album via their Facebook page. The album's artwork was created by Cameron Gray of parablevisions.com. The piece featured as the album's art is titled "Hope For The Sound Awakening."

On February 21, an official live video for the track "Recreate" was posted on Sumerian's YouTube channel. The video consisted of footage from the bonus DVD featured with the Hot Topic "exclusive special edition" of “The Discovery.“ The video was directed by Andrew Pulaski. On February 28, the band released a new video detailing the album's recording process via Revolver.

On March 9, 2011, Sumerian Records founder Ash Avildsen made an announcement aimed at prospective music pirates that the album had leaked, and encouraged said pirates to "choke on a cannonball." The leaked album turned out to be a prank, containing the full already-released single "Follow The Signs," but then following up with fart noises, celebrity quotes, and noises from the band members.

On March 14, the band released the single "Two Worlds of Design" exclusively via Noisecreep.

On March 16, Sumerian posted an album teaser for the track "The Omnicient" to its YouTube channel.

On March 17, the band announced that customers who purchased the album via FYE would receive copies containing three previously unreleased bonus tracks.

On March 21, 2011, the band made the entirety of the album available for streaming on their Facebook profile.

On June 11, 2011, the band took to its Facebook page to announce that they were planning on recording music videos for the album, and asked fans to post to the Sumerian page their suggestions for which tracks videos should be recorded for.

In January 2012, the band announced that Jason Richardson had departed the band and, upon learning Born of Osiris were moving on from him, had since joined Chelsea Grin. Richardson would then release his own statement, clarifying that he had not chosen to depart, but had rather been fired. On January 26, 2012, the band released a music video for the track "Follow The Signs." The video was directed by Andrew Pulaski, and produced by Abstrakt Pictures.

== Critical reception ==
Professional ratings
Review scores
Source	Rating
Allmusic	3/5 stars
Blabbermouth.net	6/10 stars
PopMatters	7/10 stars
The Music	4/5 stars

Commercially, the album charted at #87 on the Billboard 200. Although a lower debut then their prior release "A Higher Place," which debuted at #73, "The Discovery" moved more units in its first week, with 6,400 sold as opposed to 6,000.

The album was favorably received by critics, receiving praise for the band's evolving, more technical, sound, but also noting the band wasn't quite there in terms of refining their sound entirely. Blabbermouth.net noted the album's "obvious jump in compositional creativity" was approaching "awe-inspiring at times," but wished the band had shown some restraint with their "everything-but-the-kitchen-sink approach." The review noted that when played at "high volume on a good system, it becomes even more apparent that 'The Discovery' is packed full of amazing musicianship (the guitar work in especially),some scintillating synthesizer lines, and numerous cool "parts." The problem is that in trying to do so much, the forest frequently gets lost for the trees."

AllMusic reviewer William Ruhlmann gave the album three stars out of five, nothing Joe Buras' keyboards give the album a feeling of "sophistication," to the point that they make the album "sound like an album that was recorded in a studio with two rooms at which a progressive rock band was working next door and their music sometimes bled through the wall."

Writing for PopMatters, Chris Colgan wrote that the album was "solid" with a "number of unexpected twists and turns," and praised the continued evolution of the band's sound, though noting some may accuse them of Meshuggah influenced "trend-jumping." Colgan praised the solos from McKinney and Richardson, as well as the increased keyboard presence from Buras, concluding:

What makes The Discovery special is its expansion of the band's sound, which it does very well. Born of Osiris used to be just a deathcore band, but in the course of four years, they have become infinitely more than that. Showing a more complete grasp of their compositional range, this group will now be able to reach a very widespread audience and make them regular listeners. This album will have no trouble attracting fans of metal bands ranging from Periphery to Winds of Plague and everything in-between.

== Track listing ==
All lyrics are written by Ronnie Canizaro and Joe Buras; all music is composed by Jason Richardson, Lee McKinney and Cameron Losch, except where noted.

No.	Title	Music	Length
1.	"Follow the Signs"		3:51
2.	"Singularity"		3:33
3.	"Ascension"		2:28
4.	"Devastate"		4:35
5.	"Recreate"		4:01
6.	"Two Worlds of Design"		3:14
7.	"A Solution"	Richardson, McKinney, Losch, David Da Rocha	2:07
8.	"Shaping the Masterpiece"		4:39
9.	"Dissimulation"		2:48
10.	"Automatic Motion"		2:43
11.	"The Omniscient"		2:08
12.	"Last Straw"		4:01
13.	"Regenerate"		5:06
14.	"XIV" (Instrumental)	Richardson	1:52
15.	"Behold"		5:51
Total length:			52:57

Bonus tracks
No.	Title	Length
16.	"Follow the Signs" (Misha Mansoor demo mix)	4:09
17.	"Singularity" (Misha Mansoor demo mix)	3:37
18.	"Recreate" (Misha Mansoor demo mix)	4:07
Total length:		1:04:49

== Personnel ==
Born of Osiris

- Ronnie Canizaro – lead vocals
- Jason Richardson – lead guitar
- Lee McKinney – rhythm guitar
- David Da Rocha – bass
- Joe Buras – keyboards, synthesizers, backing vocals
- Cameron Losch – drums

Production, recording and other staff

- Don Byczynski and Lee McKinney – engineering
- Jason Suecof – mixing
- Alan Douches – mastering
- Ash Avildsen – additional lyric writing, vocal production
- Cameron Gray – artwork

== Charts ==
Chart (2011)	Peak position
US Billboard 200	87
US Billboard Independent Albums	17
US Billboard Rock Albums	23
US Billboard Hard Rock Albums	6
