= Matriarch (album) =

Studio album by Veil of Maya
- Released: May 12, 2015
- Genres: Metalcore; djent; progressive metal
- Length: 36:03
- Label: Sumerian
- Producer: Taylor Larson

Veil of Maya chronology
Eclipse (2012)	Matriarch (2015)	False Idol (2017)

Singles from Matriarch
- 1. "Phoenix" Released: January 1, 2015; 2. "Mikasa" Released: March 23, 2015; 3. "Teleute" Released: April 14, 2015

Professional ratings
Review scores
Source	Rating
About.com	4/5 stars
Blabbermouth.net	7.5/10
New Noise	4/5 stars
Ultimate Guitar	6/10

Matriarch is the fifth studio album by American metalcore band Veil of Maya. It is the band's first album with vocalist Lukas Magyar. The album was produced, mixed and mastered by Taylor Larson of From First to Last.

Written and recorded around 2014, Matriarch showed the band's shift to a less strictly technical deathcore sound and a more melodic metalcore sound.

== Background ==
As stated by guitarist Marc Okubo, every song of the album talks about a female character that he liked in movies, video games, TV shows or comics. The single "Phoenix" was released on January 1, 2015. Prior to the song's release, the band posted updates on their social media accounts with the hashtag "VeilHasRisen". A music video for the song "Mikasa" was released on March 23, as well as revealing the album's name and release date. The album became available for streaming on May 11.

== Writing and recording ==
After the departure of longtime vocalist Brandon Butler, the band began writing and recording for their next album without a singer. The band originally planned to finish the album before announcing a new vocalist until Butler's departure was announced early. After the announcement, Lukas Magyar contacted the band's manager and auditioned as the band's new vocalist. Magyar's audition was well-received by the band and he was later hired after being flown out from Wisconsin.

== Musical style ==
Matriarch is the first album by Veil of Maya to use clean vocals and sees a shift to a more metalcore sound, which has garnered mixed reception among fans.

Each track on the album excluding Matriarch is named after a powerful feminine character. These characters are respective to the tracklist order, Nyu, Leeloo, Ellie, Lucy, Mikasa Ackerman, Aerith Gainsborough, Three-Fifty, Phoenix, Teleute, Daenerys Targaryen and Lisbeth Salander.

== Track listing ==
No.	Title	Length
1.	"Nyu"	1:55
2.	"Leeloo"	2:51
3.	"Ellie"	3:03
4.	"Lucy"	2:55
5.	"Mikasa"	3:09
6.	"Aeris"	3:47
7.	"Three-Fifty"	3:26
8.	"Phoenix"	3:16
9.	"Matriarch" (instrumental)	1:18
10.	"Teleute" (featuring Jason Richardson)	3:00
11.	"Daenerys"	3:39
12.	"Lisbeth"	3:45
Total length:		36:03

== Personnel ==
All credits by AllMusic.

Veil of Maya

- Lukas Magyar - vocals
- Marc Okubo - guitars, programming, artwork concept
- Danny Hauser - bass
- Sam Applebaum - drums

Additional musicians

- Jason Richardson – additional guitar on "Teleute"

Production

- Taylor Larson - production, engineering, mixing, mastering
- Diego Farias - additional production
- Matt Good - programming
- Ernie Slenkovich - Pro-Tools editing
- Spencer Sotelo - additional engineering
- Allan Hessler - additional vocal engineering on "Nyu", "Leeloo", "Ellie", "Aeris", "Three-Fifty" and "Daenerys"
- Ash Avildsen - additional vocal production on "Aeris"
- Nick Walters (Sumerian Records) - additional vocal production on "Daenerys", A&R, artwork concept

Management

- Derek Brewer (Outerloop Management) - management
- Josh Kline (The Agency Group) - North America booking
- Marco Walzel (Avocado Booking) - Europe booking

Artwork

- Daniel McBride - album artwork, layout, artwork concept
- Natsumi Suzuki - model
- Dana Pennington - model photography
