= Id (Veil of Maya album) =

[id]
- The green edition of [id], one of the four color variants that the album was released in. The others being white, orange and red.

Studio album by Veil of Maya
- Released: April 6, 2010
- Genres: Deathcore; djent
- Length: 29:09
- Label: Sumerian
- Producer: Michael Keene

Veil of Maya chronology
The Common Man's Collapse (2008)	[id] (2010)	Eclipse (2012)

Professional ratings
Review scores
Source	Rating
AbsolutePunk	76%
AllMusic	4/5 stars
Bloody Disgusting	4/5 stars

Id (stylized as [id]) is the third studio album by American metalcore band Veil of Maya. It was released through Sumerian Records on April 6, 2010. They worked with producer Michael Keene of death metal band The Faceless on this album. Keene previously worked with the band, producing their previous album The Common Man's Collapse. It is the band's only album to feature bassist Matthew C. Pantelis.

== Culture references ==
The name of the album is a reference to the Freudian concept of the Id part of the structural part of the human psyche. The rhythm of the breakdowns in the song "Namaste" are set to the mythic numbers featured on the television series Lost (4 8 15 16 23 42). Also, the chorus of the song has the lyric "Live together, die alone," which is a reference to the episode of the same name from the series. The song "Dark Passenger" is written about the television series Dexter.

== Track listing ==
All lyrics are written by Brandon Butler; all music is composed by Marc Okubo

No.	Title	Length
1.	"[Id]" (instrumental)	0:43
2.	"Unbreakable"	3:45
3.	"Dark Passenger"	3:33
4.	"The Higler"	3:00
5.	"Martyrs" (instrumental)	1:14
6.	"Resistance"	3:01
7.	"Circle" (instrumental)	1:03
8.	"Mowgli"	3:03
9.	"Namaste"	3:30
10.	"Conquer"	2:56
11.	"Codex"	3:25
Total length:		29:09

== Personnel ==
Veil of Maya

- Brandon Butler – vocals
- Marc Okubo – guitars
- Matthew C. Pantelis – bass guitar
- Sam Applebaum – drums

Additional personnel

- Michael Keene – production, engineering, mixing, mastering
- Ash Avildsen, Shawn Keith – additional vocal production
- Daniel McBride – artwork

== Appearances ==
The ninth song "Namaste" is featured in the game Rock Band 3 as downloadable content via the Rock Band Network

== Charts ==
Chart (2010)	Peak position
The Billboard 200	107
Top Rock Albums	33
Top Hard Rock Albums	7
Top Independent Albums	16
Top Heatseekers	1
