= After the Burial =

American progressive metalcore band

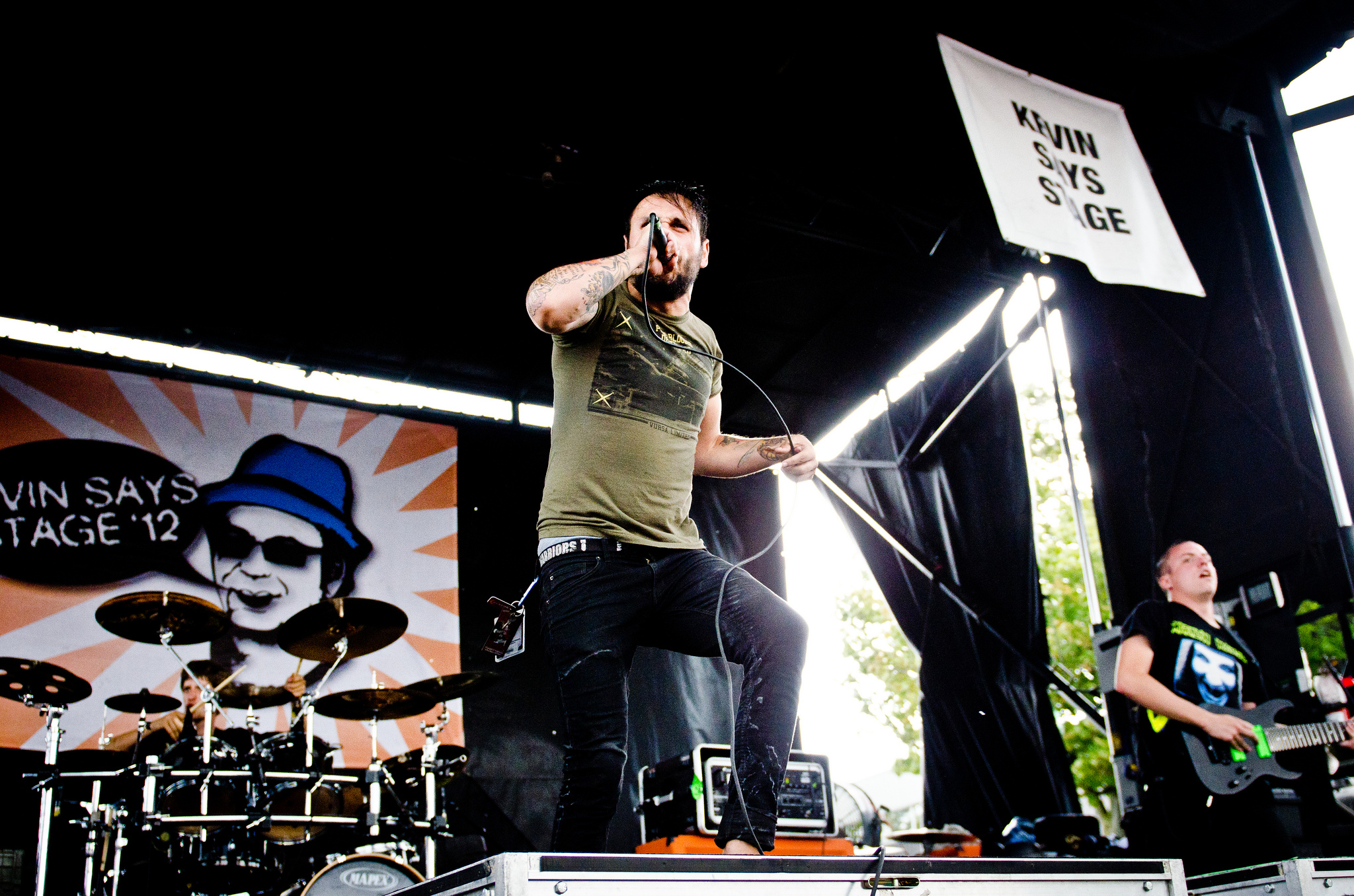
- After the Burial live at Vans Warped Tour 2012

Background information
- Origin: Minneapolis, Minnesota, U.S.
- Genres: Deathcore; progressive metalcore; djent
- Years active: 2004–present
- Label: Sumerian
- Members: Trent Hafdahl; Anthony Notarmaso; Dan Carle; Adrian Oropeza
- Past members: Greg Erickson; Nick Wellner; Eric Robles; Grant Luoma; Justin Lowe; Lerichard "Lee" Foral

After the Burial is an American deathcore band from Minneapolis, Minnesota. They are signed to Sumerian Records and have released five of their six full-length albums through the label. Since their inception in 2004, the band has gone through two vocalist changes, two drummer changes, the departure and death of founding rhythm guitarist Justin Lowe, and the departure of bassist Lerichard Foral. Lead guitarist Trent Hafdahl remains the sole remaining founding member. They are considered key contributors to the development of subgenres such as djent and progressive metalcore.

== History ==
=== Formation and Forging a Future Self (2004–2007) ===
After the Burial was founded in 2004 by Nick Wellner, Trent Hafdahl, Justin Lowe (born Justin A. Lowe in Flemington, New Jersey; December 17, 1982 – July 21, 2015), and Greg Erickson. The founders all met in high school. Dave Coleman initially filled in on bass while they searched for a permanent member. After posting an ad on a Twin Cities hardcore message board, Lee Foral responded and earned a spot in the band.

The group's first album entitled Forging a Future Self was recorded in late 2005 and was released on March 1, 2006. It was distributed via Corrosive Records, though there was never an official record deal in place.

They would later sign to Sumerian Records where Erickson and Wellner departed and Grant Luoma (of local act Nostalia) joined as vocalist. Eric Robles took Erickson's place as drummer but also departed before the recording of the band's second album.

=== Rareform (2008–2009) ===
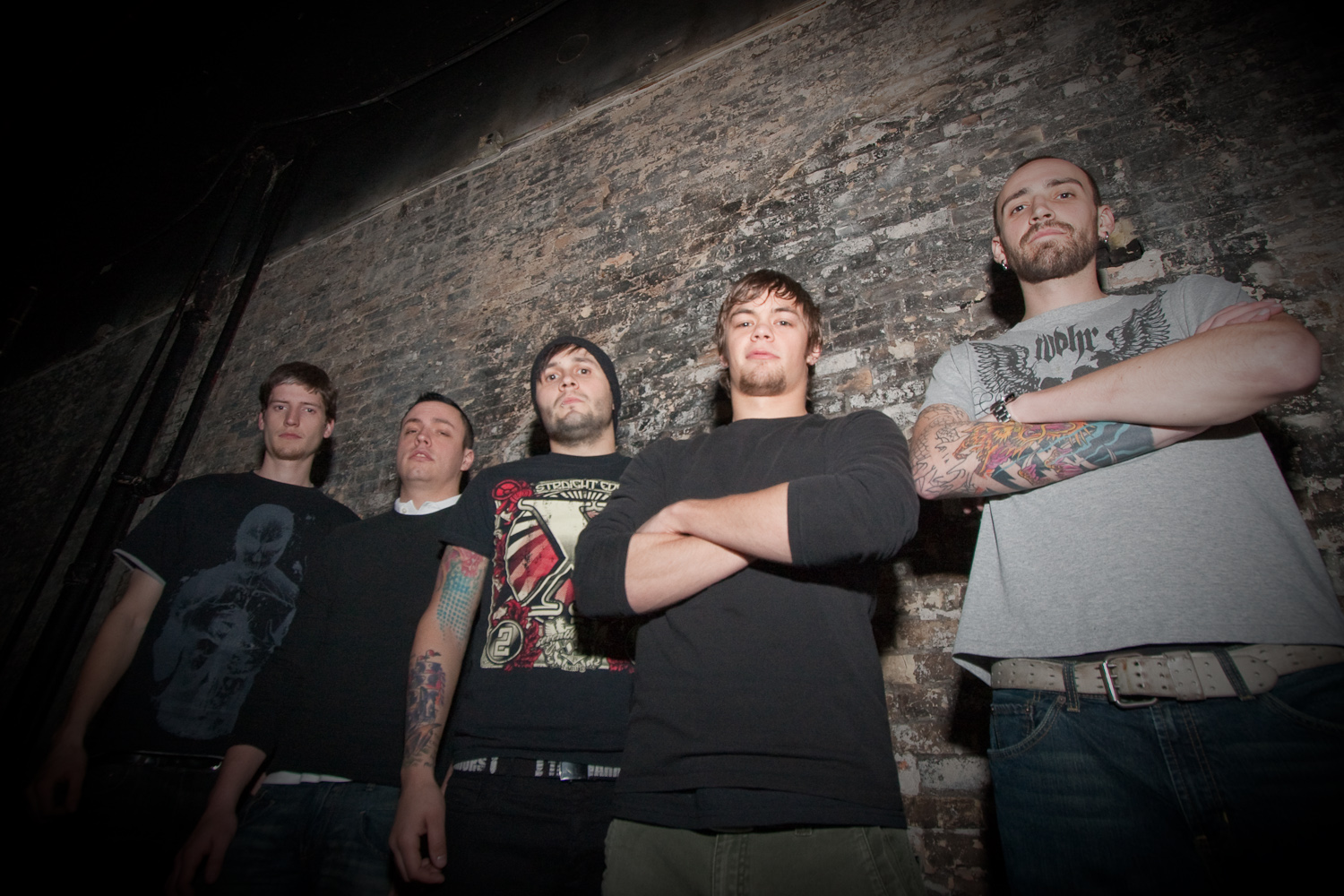
The band in 2009

The band entered the studio in 2008 to record their second studio album Rareform. All drum programming was done by the band's then current rhythm guitarist Lowe, while Hafdahl handled the lyrical writing duties due to the lack of output by then current vocalist, Luoma.

Shortly after the release, vocalist Luoma was replaced. Anthony Notarmaso joined in his place, and the band recruited Dan Carle (also of Nostalia) on drums.

In late 2008, the band supported Suicide Silence on The Cleansing The Nation Tour, and in early 2009, co-headlined a U.S. tour with Veil of Maya.

The band decided to re-release Rareform with Notarmaso's vocals in September 2009. It also included bonus content, such as live footage from a sold-out concert the band performed at.

In 2018, the band did a 10-year anniversary tour for Rareform, alongside The Acacia Strain.

=== In Dreams (2010–2012) ===
The band's third full-length album, In Dreams was recorded and released in 2010 through Sumerian.

In late 2010, the band supported Winds of Plague on The December Decimation Tour, and in 2011, headlined the Crush Em' All Tour 2.

On March 14, 2011, an extended mix of the song "Pi (The Mercury God of Infinity)" was uploaded to YouTube.

=== This Life Is All We Have EP and Wolves Within (2013–2014) ===
On April 2, 2013, Sumerian Records posted a re-mastered version of the song "A Steady Decline" and stated: "On April 1, 2006 After the Burial released their ground breaking album Forging a Future Self, which helped shape the sound of modern metal. To celebrate seven years of shred ATB has released a new take on an old favorite!"

On April 30, Sumerian Records uploaded three songs on their official YouTube channel for After the Burial's three song EP entitled This Life Is All We Have. The EP includes the following re-mastered songs from Forging a Future Self, featuring Anthony Notarmaso on vocals: "A Steady Decline", "Fingers Like Daggers", and "Redeeming the Wretched".

During live shows in 2013, After the Burial began playing two new songs called "A Wolf Amongst Ravens" and "Anti-Pattern" from their yet to be released album.

On November 5, 2013, Sumerian Records released the band's new song entitled "A Wolf Amongst Ravens" on YouTube and revealed the band's new album Wolves Within being release on December 17, 2013. They also resigned to Sumerian Records.

On November 18, 2013, the song "Of Fearful Men" was uploaded to YouTube and made available for purchase through iTunes and the entire album (Wolves Within) was released under Sumerian Records in December of the same year.

On September 16, 2014, After the Burial began a co-headlining tour with Texas in July, featuring I Declare War, Reflections, and Come the Dawn.

=== Justin Lowe's departure and death (2015) ===
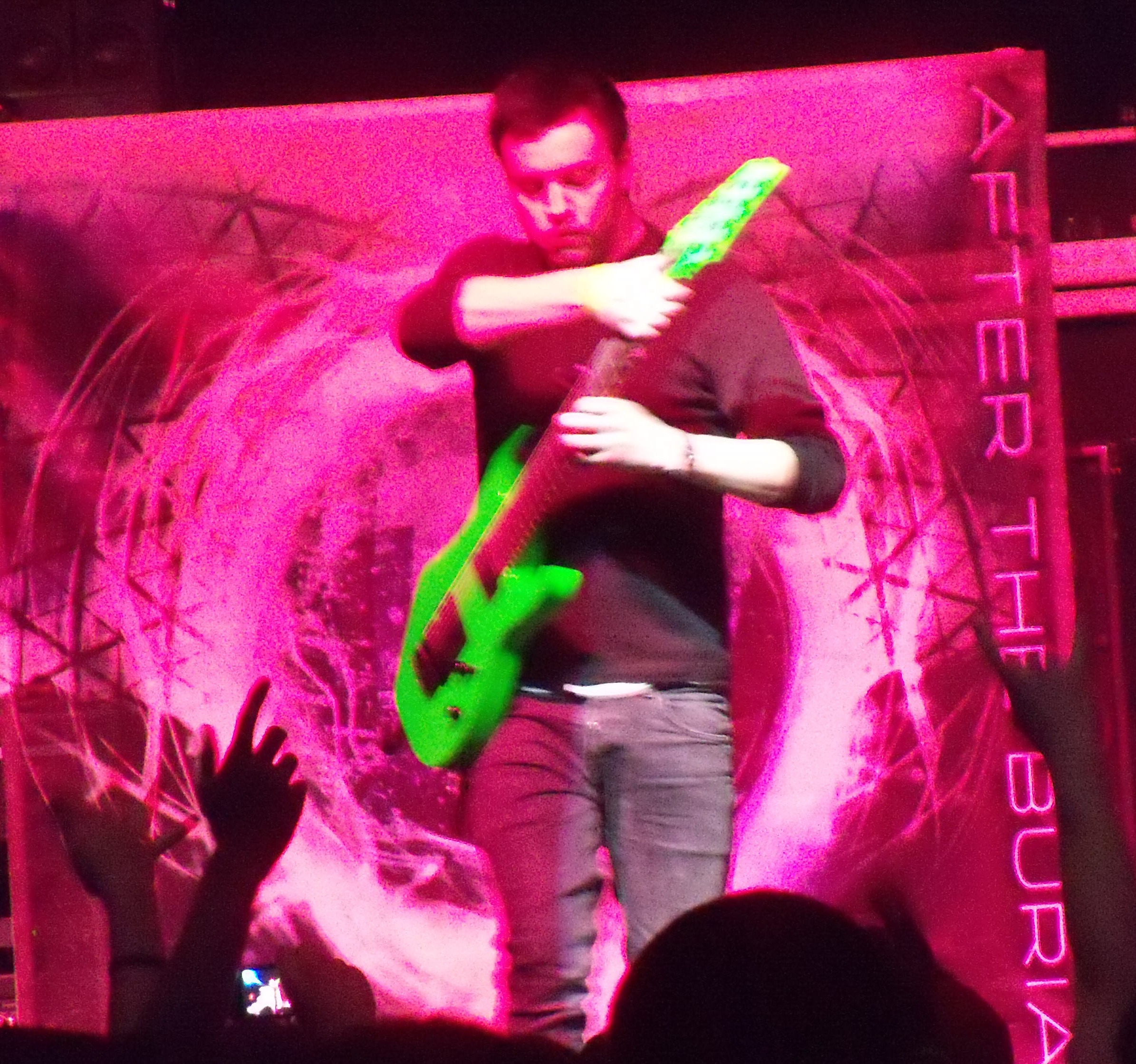
Guitarist and founding member Justin Lowe left the band and was found dead in the summer of 2015.

Guitarist and founding member Justin Lowe officially announced he left the band on June 24, 2015; he posted a lengthy statement on social media, accusing After the Burial, their record label (Sumerian Records) and most people in his life of plotting to ruin him; MetalSucks described his statement as "barely-coherent" and suspected it's a result of "a paranoid episode". After the Burial responded to Lowe's open letter the following day confirming he was under severe mental duress and requested their fans to support Lowe during his time of recovery. Lowe was under care with his family at the time.

Lowe's sister reported him missing on July 18; on the evening of July 20, 2015, Justin Lowe was pronounced officially missing, and search efforts had been put into place in order to find him. Lowe, aged 32, was found dead by a hiker on July 21, 2015, directly underneath the Soo Line High Bridge, while his car was found on the Minnesota side of the bridge. Authorities state that his death was consistent with that of a fall. It is currently unknown if the fall was accidental or intentional.

On July 27, the band released a statement on their Facebook page saying that they had decided not to perform on the Summer Slaughter tour in the wake of Lowe's passing, and that they needed time to recover from the loss of their friend.

=== Dig Deep and Lee Foral's departure (2016–2017) ===
On October 29, the band streamed the new track "Lost in the Static" and also announced a tour starting on November 5 in San Diego, being followed by The Faceless, Rings of Saturn and Toothgrinder. On New Years Day 2016, the band announced their new album Dig Deep, which was released on February 19, 2016.

On December 22, They were announced to be part of the Sumerian Records 10th Anniversary Tour with Born of Osiris, Veil of Maya, Erra and Bad Omens. The tour started on February 19 in Minneapolis.

In June 2016, Lee Foral announced his departure to focus on his family. On December 3, 2016, Adrian Oropeza was announced as a full-time After the Burial member after the year of touring with them.

=== Evergreen (2018–present) ===
On May 1, 2018, lead guitarist Trent Hafdahl announced on Instagram that the band had begun work on their sixth album. On July 20, recording wrapped up.

On February 2, 2019, the band revealed that they would be shooting a music video for a song off the upcoming album the following weekend. On February 26, they released the music video for the album's first song "Behold the Crown" and also announced that their sixth album Evergreen would be released on April 19, 2019.

After the Burial supported Parkway Drive and Killswitch Engage on their "Collapse the World" tour throughout the Spring of 2019. Vein also took part on the show as support.

After the Burial opened up for As I Lay Dying on their "Shaped by Fire" tour with Emmure in the fall of 2019. After the Burial, Carnifex, Rivers of Nihil, and Undeath supported The Black Dahlia Murder on their tour "Up From the Sewer" in the summer of 2021.

On February 18, 2022, the band released the instrumental edition of their album Dig Deep to commemorate its 6th year anniversary. In spring 2022, the band went on a tour with Thy Art Is Murder as a co-headliner. On March 30, 2023, the band released two singles "Nothing Gold" and "Death Keeps Us from Living" under the banner of a two-song single titled Embrace the Infinity. Additionally, a music video for "Nothing Gold" was also published.

In April 2023, After the Burial began a North American tour with Spiritbox and Intervals kickstarting the tour in Vancouver, Canada.

On July 11, 2025, the band released "Hum from the Hollow".

In February 2026, the band was confirmed to be on the roster for the Louder Than Life festival taking place in Louisville in September. The band will also play at Milwaukee Metal Fest in the spring of 2026.

== Musical style ==
After the Burial's musical style has been described as progressive metalcore, metalcore, deathcore, and djent. Loudwire states that they were among the first bands to perform an amalgamation of these styles, and described some of their material as sounding "relentlessly demonic".

== Band members ==
Current

- Trent Hafdahl – lead guitar, backing vocals (2004–present); rhythm guitar, programming (2015–present)
- Anthony Notarmaso – lead vocals (2008–present)
- Dan Carle – drums (2008–present)
- Adrian Oropeza – bass, backing vocals (2016–present)

Former

- Greg Erickson – drums (2004–2006)
- Nick Wellner – lead vocals (2004–2007)
- Eric Robles – drums (2006–2008)
- Grant Luoma – lead vocals (2007–2008)
- Justin Lowe – rhythm guitar, programming (2004–2015; died 2015); drums (2008)
- Lerichard "Lee" Foral – bass (2004–2016)

Timeline

== Discography ==
After the Burial discography
- Studio albums: 6
- Extended plays: 2
- Singles: 8
- Music videos: 6

=== Studio albums ===
List of studio albums, with selected chart positions
Title	Album details	Peak chart positions					
Title	Album details	US	US Heat.	US Ind.	US Hard Rock	US Rock	ARIA
Forging a Future Self	Released: March 1, 2006; Label: Self-released (distributed by Corrosive Recordings); Formats: CD, digital download	—	—	—	—	—	—
Rareform	Released: July 22, 2008; Label: Sumerian; Formats: CD, digital download	—	—	—	—	—	—
In Dreams	Released: November 23, 2010; Label: Sumerian; Formats: CD, digital download	—	3	27	12	—	—
Wolves Within	Released: December 17, 2013; Label: Sumerian; Formats: CD, digital download	—	2	27	9	44	—
Dig Deep	Released: February 19, 2016; Label: Sumerian; Formats: CD, digital download, vinyl	50	—	1	1	4	91
Evergreen	Released: April 19, 2019; Label: Sumerian; Formats: CD, digital download, vinyl	183	—	6	9	34	—
"—" denotes a recording that did not chart or was not released in that territory.

=== EPs ===
List of extended play
Title	EP details
This Life Is All We Have	Released: April 30, 2013; Label: Sumerian; Formats: Digital download
Embrace the Infinity	Released: March 23, 2023; Label: Sumerian; Formats: Digital download, vinyl

=== Singles ===
Year	Song	Album
2011	"Your Troubles Will Cease and Fortune Will Smile Upon You"	In Dreams
2011	"Pendulum"	In Dreams
2013	"A Wolf Amongst Ravens"	Wolves Within
2013	"Of Fearful Men"	Wolves Within
2015	"Lost in the Static"	Dig Deep
2016	"Collapse"	Dig Deep
2019	"Behold the Crown"	Evergreen
2019	"Exit, Exist"	Evergreen
2023	"Nothing Gold"	Embrace the Infinity
2023	"Death Keeps Us from Living"	Embrace the Infinity
2025	"Hum From The Hollow"	TBA

=== Music videos ===
List of music videos, showing year released and director
Title	Year	Director(s)	Album
"Your Troubles Will Cease and Fortune Will Smile Upon You"	2011	Scott Hansen	In Dreams
"Pendulum"	2011	—N/a	In Dreams
"A Wolf Amongst Ravens"	2014	Anthony Dubois	Wolves Within
"Lost in the Static"	2016	—N/a	Dig Deep
"Collapse"	2016	—N/a	Dig Deep
"Behold the Crown"	2019	Erez Bader	Evergreen
"Nothing Gold"	2023	Erez Bader	Embrace the Infinity
