= Forging a Future Self =

Studio album by After the Burial
- Released: March 1, 2006
- Recorded: Late 2005
- Genre: Progressive metal; metalcore
- Length: 30:11
- Label: Corrosive Recordings
- Producer: Justin Lowe

After the Burial chronology
Demo 2005 (2005)	Forging a Future Self (2006)	Rareform (2008)

Forging a Future Self is the debut studio album by American progressive metalcore band After the Burial. It was recorded in 2005 and released on March 1, 2006, through Corrosive Recordings. It is the only album to feature vocalist Nick Wellner.

== Background ==
The songs "Warm Thoughts of Warfare", "Forging a Future Self", "Isolation Theory" and "Fingers Like Daggers" were originally recorded for the band's Demo 2005.

Forging a Future Self is the only album to feature the band's original vocalist Nick Wellner and drummer Greg Erickson who were replaced by Grant Luoma and Dan Carle respectively when the band was signed to Sumerian Records later in 2007.

"A Steady Decline", "Fingers Like Daggers" and "Redeeming the Wretched" were re-recorded in 2013 for the EP This Life Is All We Have.

== Track listing ==
All tracks are written by Nick Wellner, Trent Hafdahl, Justin Lowe, Lerichard "Lee" Foral, and Greg Erickson.

No.	Title	Length
1.	"Pi (The Mercury God of Infinity)" (instrumental)	2:09
2.	"A Steady Decline"	4:00
3.	"Isolation Theory"	2:43
4.	"The Forfeit"	4:34
5.	"Fingers Like Daggers"	3:14
6.	"Forging a Future Self"	3:30
7.	"Warm Thoughts of Warfare"	2:55
8.	"Engulfed"	3:51
9.	"Redeeming the Wretched"	3:15
Total length:		30:11

10th Anniversary Edition bonus tracks
No.	Title	Length
10.	"Forging a Future Self" (demo)	3:29
11.	"Isolation Theory" (demo)	2:41
12.	"Fingers Like Daggers" (demo)	3:20

== Personnel ==
After the Burial

- Nick Wellner – lead vocals
- Trent Hafdahl – lead guitar, backing vocals
- Justin Lowe – rhythm guitar, programming, production
- Lerichard "Lee" Foral – bass
- Greg Erickson – drums
