= The Korea =

Russian metal band

- Origin: St. Petersburg, Russia
- Genres: Alternative metal; metalcore; djent; mathcore (early)
- Years active: Since 2003
- Labels: Rogue Records America; Polygon; Mazzar; Mystic Empire
- Members: Aleksandr Kuznetsov; Denis Bukhantsev; Anton Akimov; Yuri Lampochkin; Vyacheslav Sokolov
- Website: wearethekorea.ru

The Korea is a Russian metal band from Saint Petersburg, formed in 2003 under the name Korea. The group currently consists of guitarist and founding member Aleksandr Kuznetsov, guitarist Yuri Lampochkin, bassist Anton Akimov, drummer Denis Bukhantsev and lead singer Vyacheslav Sokolov (ex-Amatory). Originally oriented towards chaotic hardcore, in 2010 the band changed its name and genre towards modern metal and djent.

The Korea's third album, Chariots of the Gods, was listed in top-10 of Best 2012 djent-albums at got-djent.com, along with albums of such prominent progressive metal bands as Hacktivist, Veil of Maya, Meshuggah and Periphery, and in the list of free 2012 djent-releases Chariots of the Gods landed at position No. 1. Chariots of the Gods won "Russian album of 2012" at Russian thematic site "ДрагМеталлы".

Throughout its career, the band toured Russia, Ukraine, Belarus and EU countries and supported such bands as As I Lay Dying and Parkway Drive.

The band has released seven full-length albums, four EPs and more than 20 music videos.

== Band members ==
=== Current members ===
- Aleksandr Kuznetsov – guitars (2003–present)
- Anton Akimov – bass (2015–present)
- Denis Bukhantsev – drums (2015–present)
- Yuri Lampochkin – guitars (2015–present), sampling (2016–present)
- Vyacheslav Sokolov – vocals (2020–present)

=== Former members ===
- Stanislav Rozhdestvenskyy – bass (2003–2009)
- Ivan «Grin» Barbakov – guitars (2007–2008, 2009–2011)
- Anatoly Vankov – guitars (2011)
- Ilya «Mufasa» Sannikov – vocals (2011–2013)
- Ruslan Latypov – bass (2009–2015)
- Sergey «Farsh» Kuznetsov – drums (2003–2015)
- Evgenyy Zhukov – vocals (2014–2015)
- Evgenyy «PJ» Potekhin – vocals (2003–2011, 2015–2016), guitars (2003–2007, 2011–2015), sampling (2003–2016)
- Kirill Shtranin – vocals (2015–2019)
- Oleg Lankin – vocals (2019–2020)

== Discography ==
=== Albums ===
- 2006 – На сломанных крыльях ("On Broken Wings")
- 2007 – Пульс ("Pulse")
- 2012 – Колесницы Богов ("Chariots of the Gods")
- 2015 – Cosmogonist
- 2017 – Calypso Act I
- 2018 – Calypso Act II
- 2022 – Vorratokon
- 2024 – Мёд ("Honey")

=== EPs ===
- 2010 – Песочный человек ("Sandman")
- 2013 – Saturnus
- 2017 – Снегопады ("Snowfalls")
- 2023 – Яд ("Venom")
- 2025 – Оскал ("Grin")

=== Singles ===
- 2011 – Теория хаоса
- 2014 – На вершине горы
- 2015 – Порох
- 2015 – Чёрное море
- 2017 – Феникс
- 2017 – Снегопады
- 2018 – Ярость Марса
- 2019 – Кронос
- 2019 – Горизонты
- 2020 – Лабиринт
- 2021 – Петля
- 2021 – Миллениум
- 2021 – Пропасть
- 2022 – Изгой
- 2023 – Тварь
- 2023 – Память
- 2024 – Голод
- 2024 – Истина
- 2024 – Змеи
- 2025 – Плеть
