= Wolves Within =

Studio album by After the Burial
- Released: December 17, 2013
- Genre: Progressive metal; metalcore
- Length: 41:24
- Label: Sumerian
- Producer: Justin Lowe; Trent Hafdahl

After the Burial chronology
In Dreams (2010)	Wolves Within (2013)	Dig Deep (2016)

Singles from Wolves Within
- 1. "A Wolf Amongst Ravens" Released: November 4, 2013; 2. "Of Fearful Men" Released: November 18, 2013

Wolves Within is the fourth studio album by American progressive metalcore band After the Burial. It was released on December 17, 2013, through Sumerian Records, and is the band's last release to feature guitarist Justin Lowe before his departure in June 2015 followed by his death a month later. The song "Virga" features guest vocals from the band's former lead vocalist Nick Wellner.

== Track listing ==
All tracks are written by After the Burial.

No.	Title	Length
1.	"Anti-Pattern"	3:27
2.	"Of Fearful Men"	4:25
3.	"Pennyweight"	4:54
4.	"Disconnect"	5:58
5.	"Nine Summers"	4:56
6.	"Virga" (featuring Nick Wellner)	4:14
7.	"Neo Seoul"	3:58
8.	"Parise"	4:25
9.	"A Wolf Amongst Ravens"	5:08
Total length:		41:24

Professional ratings
Aggregate scores
Source	Rating
Metacritic	72/100
Review scores
Source	Rating
AllMusic	4/5 stars
Exclaim!	6/10
Ultimate Guitar	7.3/10

== Personnel ==
After the Burial

- Anthony Notarmaso – lead vocals, vocal production
- Trent Hafdahl – lead guitar, backing vocals, engineering, mixing, mastering, production
- Justin Lowe – rhythm guitar, programming, engineering, mixing, mastering, arranging, vocal mixing, production
- Lerichard "Lee" Foral – bass
- Dan Carle – drums

Additional musicians

- Nick Wellner – guest vocals on track 6, vocal production

Additional personnel

- Terry Date – mixing, production on track 9
- Daniel Castleman – vocal mixing
- Adam Mott (Outerloop Management) – management
- Amanda Fiore (The Pantheon Agency, US) & Marco Walzel (Avocado Bookings, International) – booking
- Austin Wade (Wade Visual) – artwork
- Daniel McBride (McBride Design) – layout
