= In Dreams (After the Burial album) =

Studio album by After the Burial
- Released: November 23, 2010
- Recorded: January–July 2010
- Genre: Progressive metal; metalcore; deathcore
- Length: 34:28
- Label: Sumerian
- Producer: Jocke Skog; Justin Lowe; Trent Hafdahl

After the Burial chronology
Rareform (2008)	In Dreams (2010)	Wolves Within (2013)

Singles from In Dreams
- 1. "Your Troubles Will Cease and Fortune Will Smile Upon You" Released: August 16, 2011; 2. "Pendulum" Released: September 7, 2011

In Dreams is the third studio album by American progressive metalcore band After the Burial. It was released on November 23, 2010, through Sumerian Records. It is the first After the Burial album to feature music videos, which were produced for songs "Pendulum" and "Your Troubles Will Cease and Fortune Will Smile Upon You". This album also features more prominent clean backing vocals sung by lead guitarist Trent Hafdahl.

In 2024, Metal Injection included the album in their list of "10 Deathcore Albums That Aged Incredibly Well".

Professional ratings
Review scores
Source	Rating
AllMusic	4/5 stars
Alternative Press	3.5/5 stars
Blabbermouth.net	8/10
Lambgoat	8/10
Metal Injection	7/10
MetalSucks	2.5/5 stars

== Track listing ==
All tracks are written by After the Burial.

No.	Title	Length
1.	"My Frailty"	4:43
2.	"Your Troubles Will Cease and Fortune Will Smile Upon You"	4:44
3.	"Pendulum"	4:47
4.	"Bread Crumbs & White Stones"	3:38
5.	"To Carry You Away"	5:33
6.	"Sleeper"	3:19
7.	"Promises Kept"	4:19
8.	"Encased in Ice"	3:25
Total length:		34:28

== Personnel ==
After the Burial

- Anthony Notarmaso – lead vocals
- Trent Hafdahl – lead guitar, backing vocals, production
- Justin Lowe – rhythm guitar, programming, engineering, production
- Lerichard "Lee" Foral – bass
- Dan Carle – drums

Additional musicians

- Jocke Skog – vocals, programming, composing, mixing, mastering, production
- Rusty Cooley – guitar solo in "Encased in Ice"

Additional personnel

- Will Putney – vocal production
- Daniel McBride – artwork, layout
- Shawn Keith – A&R

== Chart positions ==
Chart (2010)	Peak position
US Top Heatseekers Albums	3
US Top Hard Rock Albums	12
US Top Independent Albums	27
