= Dig Deep (album) =

Studio album by After the Burial
- Released: February 19, 2016
- Genre: Progressive metalcore
- Length: 38:51
- Label: Sumerian
- Producer: Will Putney; After the Burial

After the Burial chronology
Wolves Within (2013)	Dig Deep (2016)	Evergreen (2019)

Singles from Dig Deep
- 1. "Lost in the Static" Released: October 29, 2015; 2. "Collapse" Released: February 4, 2016

Dig Deep is the fifth studio album by American progressive metalcore band After the Burial. The album was released on February 19, 2016, through Sumerian Records and is the band's first release since the death of guitarist Justin Lowe. It is also the final album by the band to feature founding bassist Lee Foral, who announced his departure from the band later that year in June.

== Release ==
The release of Dig Deep was announced on January 4, 2016, when the cover art and track listing was unveiled. The first single "Lost in the Static" was released on October 29, 2015. "Collapse" was the second song released off Dig Deep, it premiered on February 4, 2016. Two days before the official album release a full album stream was made available via Metal Injection. On February 18, 2022, to commemorate the album's six-year anniversary, the band released an instrumental version of the album.

== Track listing ==
All tracks are written by Anthony Notarmaso, Trent Hafdahl and Dan Carle. (Note: While not credited, a demo reel posted on YouTube by Justin Lowe before his death features riffs that would eventually become "Lost in the Static", "Deluge", and "Laurentian Ghosts".)

No.	Title	Length
1.	"Collapse"	4:12
2.	"Lost in the Static"	4:33
3.	"Mire"	4:25
4.	"Deluge"	4:25
5.	"Laurentian Ghosts"	5:02
6.	"Heavy Lies the Ground"	4:46
7.	"Catacombs"	4:24
8.	"The Endless March"	3:38
9.	"Sway of the Break"	3:26
Total length:		38:51

Professional ratings
Review scores
Source	Rating
AllMusic	4/5 stars
AntiHero Magazine	7/10 stars
Metal Injection	8.5/10
New Noise	4/5 stars
PopMatters	7/10 stars
qJukeBox	10/10

== Personnel ==
Writing, performance and production credits are adapted from the album liner notes.

=== After the Burial ===
- Anthony Notarmaso – lead vocals
- Trent Hafdahl – guitars, programming, backing vocals
- Lerichard "Lee" Foral – bass
- Dan Carle – drums

=== Additional personnel ===
- Will Putney – production, mixing, mastering
- After the Burial – production, mixing, mastering
- Nick Walters and Ash Avildsen – A&R
- Daniel McBride – artwork, layout

== Charts ==
Chart (2016)	Peak position
Australian Albums (ARIA)	91
US Billboard 200	50
