= Evergreen (After the Burial album) =

Studio album by After the Burial
- Released: April 19, 2019
- Genre: Progressive metalcore
- Length: 39:58
- Label: Sumerian
- Producer: Will Putney; Trent Hafdahl

After the Burial chronology
Dig Deep (2016)	Evergreen (2019)	Embrace the Infinity (2023)

Singles from Evergreen
- 1. "Behold the Crown" Released: February 26, 2019; 2. "Exit, Exist" Released: April 2, 2019

Evergreen is the sixth studio album by American progressive metalcore band After the Burial. The album was released on April 19, 2019, through Sumerian Records and is the band's first release with the bassist Adrian Oropeza.

== Release ==
The release of Evergreen was announced on February 26, 2019, when the cover art and track listing was unveiled. The first single "Behold the Crown" was released that same day. "Exit, Exist" was the second song released off Evergreen, which premiered on April 2, 2019.

Professional ratings
Review scores
Source	Rating
Distorted Sound	9/10
Exclaim!	6/10
Ghost Cult	7/10
Rock 'N' Load	9/10
The Sound Board	7/10

== Track listing ==
All tracks are written by After the Burial.

No.	Title	Length
1.	"Behold the Crown"	4:34
2.	"Exit, Exist"	3:55
3.	"11/26"	5:08
4.	"In Flux"	6:05
5.	"Respire"	4:39
6.	"Quicksand"	4:14
7.	"The Great Repeat"	3:34
8.	"To Challenge Existence"	3:34
9.	"A Pulse Exchanged"	4:19
Total length:		39:58

== Personnel ==
Credits retrieved from AllMusic.

=== After the Burial ===
- Anthony Notarmaso – lead vocals
- Trent Hafdahl – guitars, programming, backing vocals, production
- Adrian Oropeza – bass
- Dan Carle – drums

=== Additional personnel ===
- Will Putney – engineering, mastering, mixing, production
- Steve Seid – engineering
- Matt Guglielmo – assisting
- Ash Avildsen and Nick Walters – A&R
- Daniel McBride – artwork, layout

== Charts ==
Chart (2019)	Peak position
Australian Digital Albums (ARIA)	37
US Billboard 200	183
