= Namaste (disambiguation) =

Namaste is a greeting originating from India and Nepal.

Namaste may also refer to:

- "Namaste" (Better Call Saul), an episode from the television series Better Call Saul
- "Namaste" (Lost), an episode from the television series Lost
- Salaam Namaste, a 2005 Indian Bollywood film
- "Namasté", a Beastie Boys track from the album Check Your Head
- "Namaste", a Veil of Maya track from the album [id]
- Namaste Retreat Center, former retreat center that shared grounds with the Living Enrichment Center

== See also ==
- Namaste, an Indian film series
  - Namastey London, a 2007 Indian film
    - Namaste England, its 2018 sequel
- Bistra, Alba, for the Romanian village of Nămaş
