= All Things Set Aside =

Studio album by Veil of Maya
- Released: November 7, 2006
- Recorded: 2006
- Genre: Deathcore
- Length: 29:59
- Label: Corrosive
- Producer: Veil of Maya

Veil of Maya chronology
All Things Set Aside (2006)	The Common Man's Collapse (2008)

Professional ratings
Review scores
Source	Rating
AbsolutePunk	7.6/10
AllMusic	Favorable
Lambgoat	7/10

All Things Set Aside is the debut studio album by American deathcore band Veil of Maya. It was self-produced and released on November 7, 2006, through Corrosive Recordings. It is the only album to feature original vocalist Adam Clemans.

== Overview ==
All songs on the album were written and recorded by Veil of Maya, with the exception of the hidden track titled "The Session", which is a rap song, written and recorded by Chicago rappers Vigor Lynx, Getatem, Mike J, MO and DJ Robert.

The songs "Entry Level Exit Wounds" and "Sever the Voices" were re-recorded for the band's proceeding album, The Common Man's Collapse with the band's succeeding vocalist Brandon Butler.

== Track listing ==
All tracks are written by Veil of Maya (Adam Clemans, Marc Okubo, Kristopher "The Higler" Hilger, and Sam Applebaum), except where noted.

No.	Title	Length
1.	"The Uprising" (instrumental)	1:33
2.	"Entry Level Exit Wounds"	2:53
3.	"Your World of Lies"	6:05
4.	"Mark My Words"	3:04
5.	"All Things Set Aside"	3:05
6.	"Indefinite Bloodlust"	3:47
7.	"Sever the Voices"	4:52
8.	"Black Funeral March"	4:40
Total length:		29:59

Hidden track
No.	Title	Writer(s)	Length
1.	"The Session"	Vigor Lynx, Getatem, Mike J, MO, DJ Robert	3:26

== Personnel ==
Veil of Maya

- Adam Clemans – vocals
- Marc Okubo – guitars
- Kristopher "The Higler" Hilger – bass guitar
- Sam Applebaum – drums

Additional personnel

- Artwork by Michael Adler
- Production by Veil of Maya on tracks 1–8
