= Sirens (American band) =

American metal band

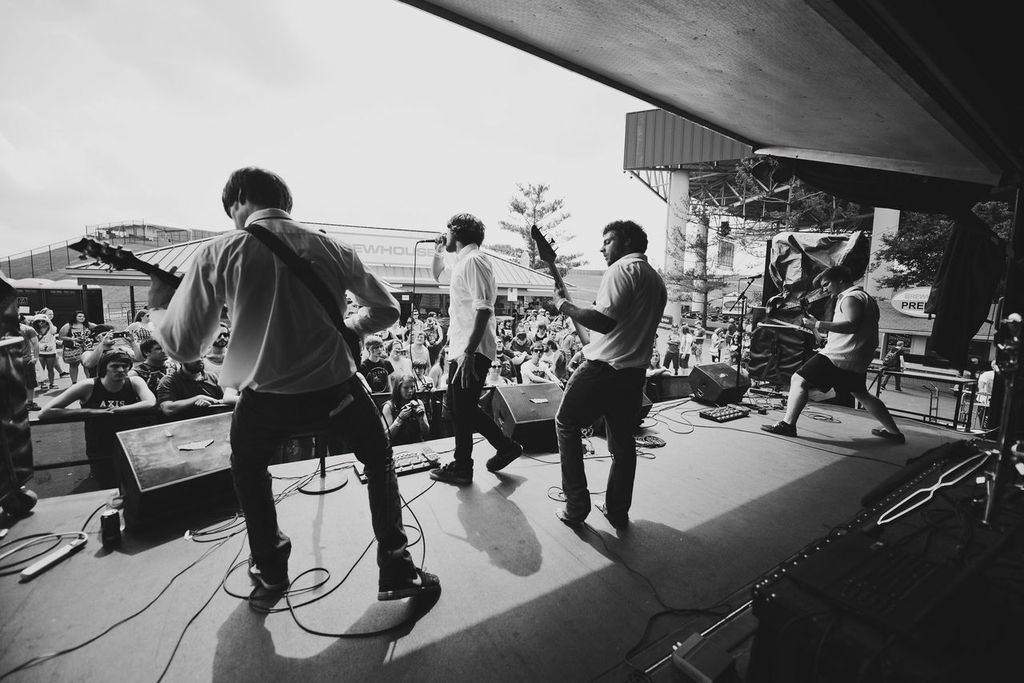
- Sirens live in Indianapolis on Warped Tour 2013

Background information
- Origin: Terre Haute, Indiana, United States
- Genres: Progressive metalcore, djent
- Years active: 2011–present
- Labels: Independent
- Members: Joey Fenoglio; Logan Pollaro; Zhea Erose; Cody Butler; Luke Boismier
- Past members: Jordan Thralls; Jordan Caylor
- Website: wearesirens.com

Sirens is an American metalcore band from Terre Haute, Indiana formed in 2011. They released their debut EP, entitled Spore, in June 2012, before releasing a remixed and remastered version of the EP via Imminence Records on November 13, 2012. In 2013, Sirens competed in the Ernie Ball Battle of the Bands, where they place first nationally amongst the fan vote. On June 18, 2013, Ernie Ball announced Sirens as a winner for Indianapolis's Warped Tour 2013. Sirens has since left Imminence Records.

On June 12, 2015, Sirens announced a new album titled Surge. Surge was released July 28, 2015.

== Members ==
Current

- Joey Fenoglio – vocals (2011–present)
- Logan Pollaro – guitar (2014–present), bass (2011–2014)
- Zhea Erose – drums, electronics (2011–present)

Past

- Jordan Thralls – guitar (2011–2014)
- Jordan Caylor – guitar, vocals (2011–2014)
- Cody Butler – guitar (2015–2016)
- Luke Boismier - bass (2015–2017)

== Discography ==
=== Studio albums ===
LP

- Surge (2015)
1. "Surge"
2. "Drift"
3. "Drone"
4. "Pendulous"
5. "Ephyra"
6. "Macroscopic"
7. "Cloudbreak"
8. "Unstable and Floating"
9. "Swarm Dynamics"
10. "Medusae"

=== EPs ===
- Spore (2012)
1. "Drift"
2. "Cloudbreak"
3. "Unstable and Floating"
4. "Music Box"
5. "Propaganda"

=== Singles ===
- "Drone" (2013)
- "Pendulous (2014)
- "Swarm Dynamics (2015)
