= A Higher Place =

Studio album by Born of Osiris
- Released: July 7, 2009
- Recorded: January–April 2009
- Genre: Deathcore; progressive metal
- Length: 34:09
- Label: Sumerian
- Producer: Zeuss

Born of Osiris chronology
The New Reign (2007)	A Higher Place (2009)	The Discovery (2011)

Singles from A Higher Place
- 1. "Now Arise" Released: September 10, 2009

Professional ratings
Review scores
Source	Rating
Allmusic	4/5 stars
Blabbermouth	7.5/10

A Higher Place is the debut studio album by American progressive metalcore band Born of Osiris. It was released through Sumerian Records on July 7, 2009. A Higher Place debuted at number 73 on the Billboard 200, selling over 6,000 copies. It was the first album to have any creative input outside of the band's mastermind and drummer, Cameron Losch. Up until this point, he had written and recorded everything short of vocals on every song. Though this is mostly true for A Higher Place as well, "Exist" was written and recorded by Lee Mckinney. An earlier instrumental version of this song can be found under the title "Glass Bluntz". Though the two versions are quite different, they share the same hook that "Exist" is mostly noted for.

In September 2009, the band announced a new single, "Now Arise", and released the music video for it on the same day.

== Track listing ==
All tracks are written by Born of Osiris.

Standard edition
No.	Title	Length
1.	"Rebirth"	1:26
2.	"Elimination"	2:05
3.	"The Accountable"	2:12
4.	"Now Arise"	3:52
5.	"Live Like I'm Real"	2:42
6.	"Starved"	2:46
7.	"Exist"	2:16
8.	"Put to Rest"	3:11
9.	"A Descent"	2:18
10.	"A Higher Place"	2:51
11.	"An Ascent"	3:21
12.	"Thrive"	2:41
13.	"Faces of Death"	2:28
Total length:		34:09

Notes

- Track 1 is a continuation of "The Takeover" from The New Reign EP.

== Personnel ==
Born of Osiris

- Ronnie Canizaro – lead vocals
- Lee McKinney – lead guitar
- David Darocha – bass
- Joe Buras – keyboards, backing vocals
- Cameron Losch – drums, rhythm guitar, bass

Production and recording

- Chris "Zeuss" Harris – production
- Ash Avildsen – executive production
- Shawn Keith – executive production
- Chris Dowhan – mastering, mixing
- Andreas Lars Magnusson – mastering, mixing
- Mike Rashmawi – vocal recording

== Charts ==
Chart (2010)	Peak position
US Billboard 200	73
US Top Independent Albums	8
