= Unprocessed =

German metalcore band

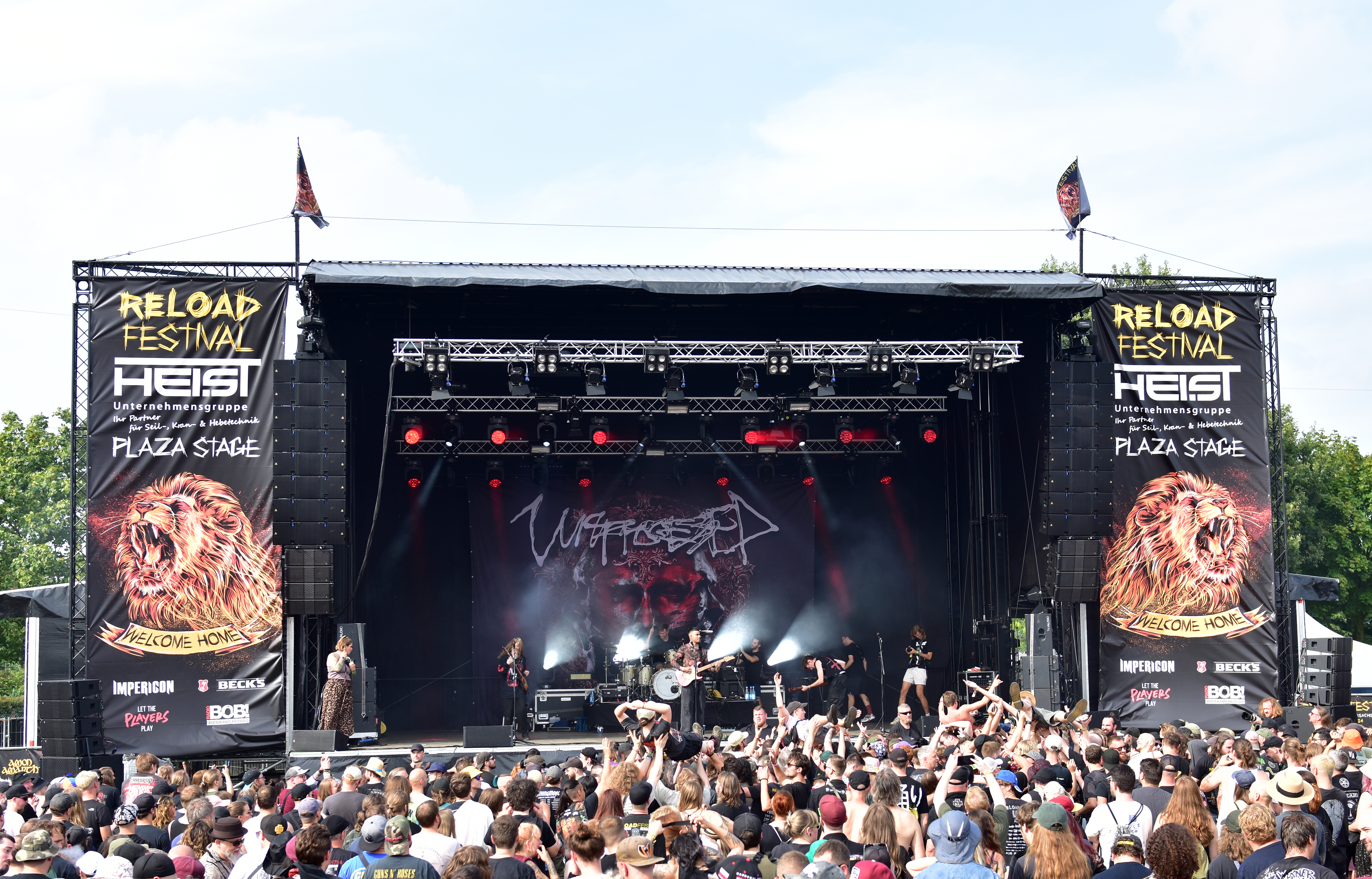
- Unprocessed performing in 2024

Background information
- Origin: Wiesbaden, Germany
- Genres: Progressive metalcore; progressive metal; alternative metal; djent; alternative rock
- Years active: 2013–present
- Label: Spinefarm
- Members: Manuel Gardner Fernandes; David John Levy; Christoph Schultz; Leon Pfeifer
- Past members: Simon Lorenz; Jan Aimène; Marvin Jüchtern; Christopher Talosi
- Website: unprocessed.band

Unprocessed is a German progressive metal band from Wiesbaden, formed in 2013. They have released six studio albums and three EPs.

== History ==
Unprocessed, a German progressive metal band, was formed in Wiesbaden in 2013 by Manuel Gardner Fernandes (vocals, guitar), Christoph Schultz (guitar), Christopher Talosi (guitar), Simon Lorenz (bass), and Jan Aimène (drums). They released their debut studio album, In Concretion, the following year. This was followed by the EP Perception in 2016, which marked the last release with Lorenz and Aimène.

The group issued their second studio album, Covenant, in 2018, with new bassist David John Levy and drummer Leon Pfeifer. Artificial Void followed in 2019 and was the last album with Talosi.

In early 2020, Unprocessed accompanied Polyphia on their European tour. This led to a collaboration on the single "Real" in July, which featured Polyphia guitarist Tim Henson and bassist Clay Gober.

In August 2022, they published their fourth album, Gold.

In September 2023, the band came out with "Thrash", the first single from their fifth album, ...And Everything in Between, which was released in December.

In October 2025, their sixth studio album, Angel, was published to critical acclaim, with New Noise Magazine giving it four-and-a-half stars out of five and calling it the band's "most adventurous album yet".

== Band members ==
Current

- Manuel Gardner Fernandes – vocals, guitar (2013–present)
- Christoph Schultz – guitar (2013–present)
- David John Levy – bass, synthesizer, vocals (2017–present)
- Leon Pfeifer – drums (2017–present)

Past

- Simon Lorenz – bass (2013–2016)
- Jan Aimène – drums (2013–2016)
- Marvin Jüchtern – keyboards, electronics (2013–2016)
- Christopherr Talosi – guitar (2017–2019)

Timeline

== Discography ==
=== Studio albums ===
- In Concretion (2014)
- Covenant (2018)
- Artificial Void (2019)
- Gold (2022)
- Gold (Instrumental) (2022)
- ...And Everything in Between (2023)
- ...And Everything in Between (Instrumental) (2024)
- Angel (2025)
- Angel (Instrumental) (2026)

=== EPs ===
- Perception (2016)
- Boy Without a Gun (2022)
- Lost Tapes (2026)
