= DVSR =

Australian rap metal band

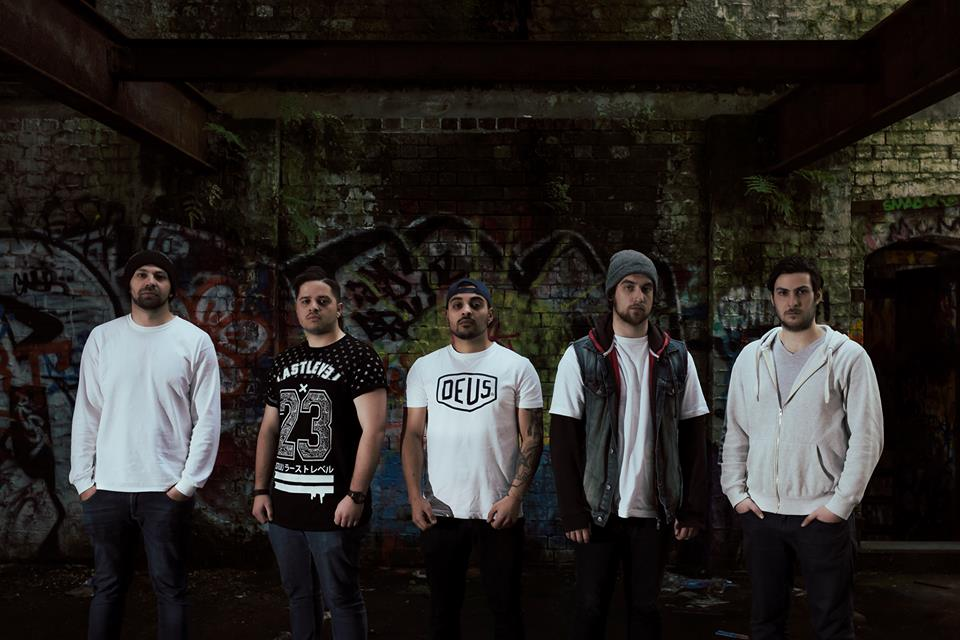
- DVSR in 2015

Background information
- Origin: South Western Sydney, New South Wales, Australia
- Genres: Rap metal; djent; nu metal
- Years active: 2013–present
- Members: Matthew Youkhana; Andrew Stevens; Julian Ellul; Matthew Nekic
- Website: www.dvsr.com.au

DVSR (Designed Via Strength & Respect) are an Australian rap metal band from Sydney. They were formed in November 2013, and released their debut studio album D.V.S.R. in November 2015.

== History ==
On 24 November 2013, DVSR, then under the name Devastator, was announced and simultaneously released their music video for their single "Unconscious". The single was met with generally positive reviews, and they were noted for their unusual amalgamation of rap and djent.

In November 2015, the band announced that they were changing their name from Devastator to DVSR to coincide with their upcoming album of the same name. This was due to there already being other bands with the name Devastator, so to avoid confusion when searching online they turned the original name into an acronym; DVSR stands for "Designed Via Strength & Respect". Later that month, they released their debut self-titled album, D.V.S.R..

== Members ==
Current

- Matthew You – vocals/rapping (2013–present)
- Andrew Stevens – guitars (2013–present)
- Julian Ellul – bass (2016–present)
- Matthew Nekić – drums (2013–present)

=== Past ===
- Adrian Tate – bass, backing vocals (2013–2016)
- Alessandro Sabato – guitars (2013–2016)

== Discography ==
=== Studio albums ===
List of studio albums
Year	Album details
2015	D.V.S.R.: Released: 23 November 2015; Label: Self released; Formats: CD, digital download
2020	West Technique: Released: 7 August 2020; Label: Self released; Formats: CD, digital download

=== Extended plays ===
Extended plays
Year	Album details
2017	Therapy: Released: 20 November 2017; Label: Self released; Formats: CD, digital download

=== Singles ===
Year	Song	Album
2013	"Unconscious"	D.V.S.R.
2014	"The Forked Tongue"	D.V.S.R.
2014	"Life and Death"	D.V.S.R.
2015	"Shutdown..."	D.V.S.R.
2016	"Bad Company"	
2017	"Slave to the Beat"	Therapy EP
2018	"Ready for War"	Therapy EP
2020	"Off Tap"	West Technique
2020	"Bloodlust (feat. CJ McMahon)"	West Technique
