= Born of Osiris =

American metalcore band

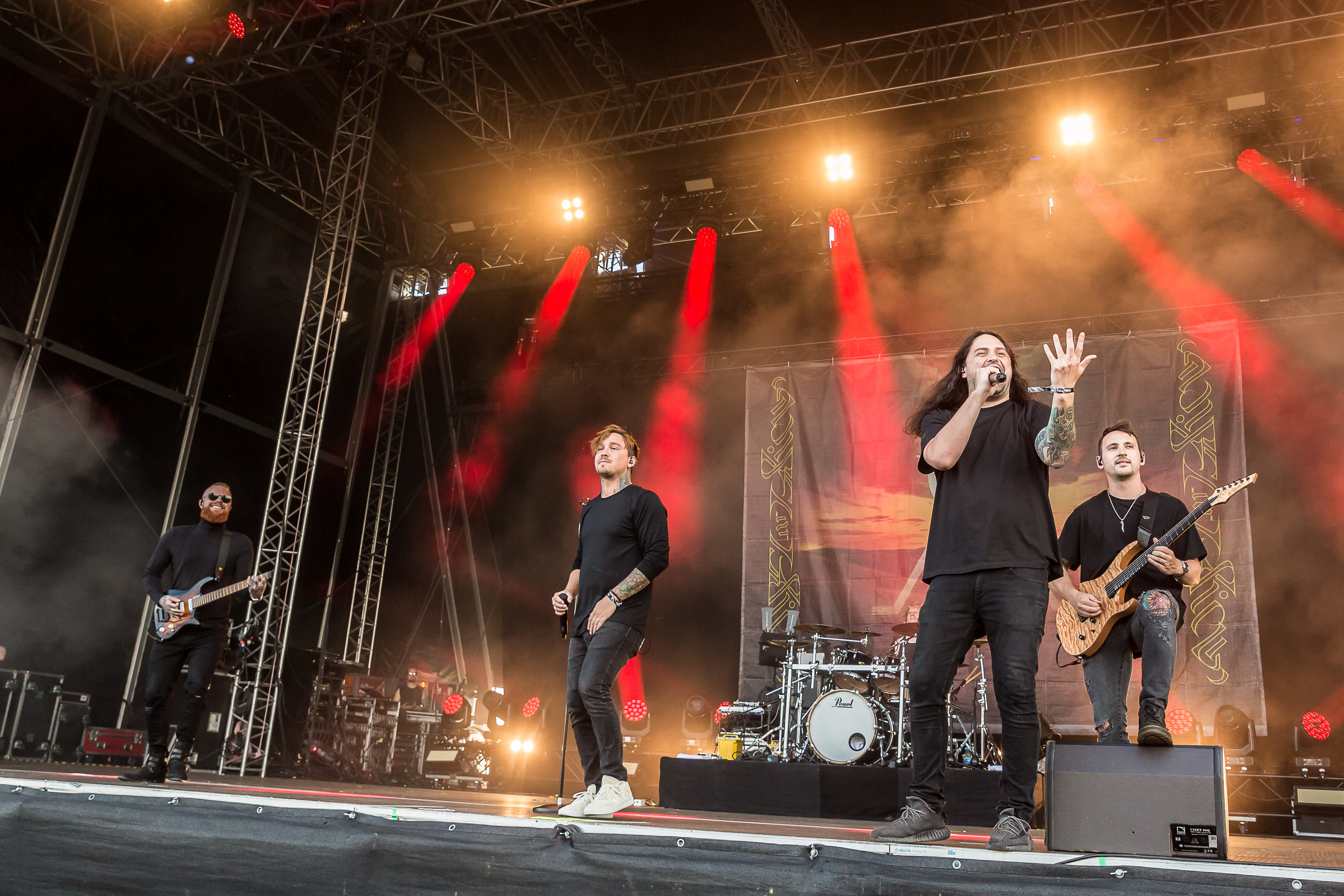
- Born of Osiris live in 2023

Background information
- Also known as: Diminished (2003–2004); Your Heart Engraved (2004–2006); Rosecrance (2006–2007)
- Origin: Palatine, Illinois, U.S.
- Genres: Progressive metalcore; djent; technical death metal; deathcore (early)
- Years active: 2003–present
- Label: Sumerian
- Members: Cameron Losch; Ronnie Canizaro; Nick Rossi; Travis Montgomery; Dan Marinaro
- Past members: Trevor Hurlbert; Mike Mancebo; Joe Phillips; Austin Krause; Dan Laabs; Mike Shanahan; Joel Negus; Matthew C. Pantelis; Lee McKinney; Jason Richardson; David Darocha; Joe Buras
- Website: Born of Osiris on Facebook

Born of Osiris is an American progressive metalcore band formed in 2003 in Palatine, Illinois, a suburb of Chicago. The band currently consists of drummer and sole remaining founding member Cameron Losch, lead vocalist Ronnie Canizaro, rhythm guitarist and keyboardist Nick Rossi, lead guitarist Travis Montgomery, and bassist and backing vocalist Dan Marinaro. Born of Osiris has played at various festivals including the Summer Slaughter Tour (2008, 2009, 2015 and 2018) and the Music as a Weapon Tour 4.

The group underwent several name changes before settling on Born of Osiris in 2007, basing the name on the Egyptian deity Osiris and the tale of his son Horus.

== History ==
=== Early years and The New Reign (2003–2007) ===
In its early years, the band belonged to the Northland Chicago metalcore scene with bands such as Veil of Maya, Monsters, Oceano, and For All I Am. The members attended Fremd High School.

As Diminished, they released the five-song demo EP Your Heart Engraved These Messages in 2003. This was the only release from the band to feature two lead vocalists.

Their next name came from that demo, Your Heart Engraved. As such, the band released the twelve-song demo Youm Wara Youm. During that time, the band released the satirical rap song "Stressed". The song was originally featured on the band's Myspace account.

The band changed names again in 2006, this time to Rosecrance. They released a self-titled, seven-track demo EP, containing re-recordings of songs off their second demo and two extra satirical rap songs, "HopeYouDie" and "Paddy Wack". The latter was based on the nursery rhyme of the same name.

In 2007, the band changed their name to Born of Osiris. The first song released under the name was "Narnia", later retitled "The Takeover" on The New Reign. The New Reign marked the end of their post-hardcore/metalcore phase and the beginning of their technical deathcore sound. During this time, the band signed to Sumerian Records.

=== A Higher Place, The Discovery and Richardson's departure (2008–2012) ===
In July 2009, the band released their debut album, A Higher Place, which peaked at number 73 on the Billboard 200. They co-headlined a tour named The Night of the Living Shred with All Shall Perish, After the Burial, Caliban and Suffokate. Born of Osiris supported Hatebreed on the Decimation of the Nation Tour 2, with Cannibal Corpse, Unearth and Hate Eternal.

In December 2009, they asked Jason Richardson of All Shall Perish to join Born of Osiris. This began a two-year period of member stability that resulted in the writing and release of their second full-length album, The Discovery. Released on March 22, 2011, the album debuted at 87 on the Billboard 200. Richardson was asked to leave the band later that year.

In September 2011, members Cameron Losch, Joe Buras, and Lee McKinney recorded and mixed the self-titled first release by Virginia band Mind's I.

David Darocha started his own jewelry line called D A V I. Losch, McKinney and former lead guitarist Jason Richardson were instructors on the music teaching website Bandhappy, owned by Matt Halpern, the drummer of Born of Osiris's former labelmate Periphery. As of November 2014, Halpern shut down the site to focus on Periphery.

=== Tomorrow We Die Alive and Soul Sphere (2013–2015) ===
On June 25, 2013, the Sumerian Records YouTube page uploaded the Born of Osiris song "Machine" as well as the album Tomorrow We Die Alive, which was released August 20, 2013. They toured across North America on the 2013 Rockstar Mayhem Festival alongside Five Finger Death Punch, Rob Zombie and Machine Head. Born of Osiris supported Asking Alexandria on their Breakdown the Walls Tour alongside August Burns Red, Crown the Empire and We Came as Romans. The band played on the Monster Energy Stage for the 2014 Vans Warped Tour and headlined in October 2014 to support Tomorrow We Die Alive. Within the Ruins, ERRA, Betraying the Martyrs and Thy Art Is Murder supported the band. The band opened up for The Devil Wears Prada with The Word Alive and Secrets joining as support in early 2015. Mid-2015 saw the band open up for Arch Enemy on the 2015 annual Summer Slaughter tour. In September 2015, the band went to Russia to support Emmure on a small tour.

A new album, Soul Sphere was released on October 23, 2015. In February 2016, the band headlined the Sumerian Records Ten Year Tour. Veil of Maya, After the Burial, ERRA and Bad Omens joined them on the lineup. A second leg of the tour started in May with Upon a Burning Body added to the lineup, replacing Veil of Maya. The band played in Europe in September 2016, with Veil of Maya as a co-headliner and with Volumes and Black Crown Initiate as support.

=== The Eternal Reign and The Simulation (2016–2020) ===
In 2017, the band released the new song "Glorious Day", a re-recording of a track included on their 2004 demo, Youm Wara Youm, and which was originally intended to appear on their 2007 EP The New Reign.

Following the unveiling of "Glorious Day", Born of Osiris announced that they were in the process of developing a new EP, The Eternal Reign — a re-recording of The New Reign EP. After this, the band toured to celebrate The New Reign's tenth anniversary. The first half of the tour featured Volumes, Oceans Ate Alaska, and Within the Ruins and Fire From the Gods as support. The second half had Volumes return with Betraying the Martyrs and Widowmaker. The Eternal Reign was released in February 2017.

In 2018, the band went on the Summer Slaughter tour. On July 16, 2018, they released the first single, "Silence the Echo," and announced the departure of bassist David Darocha, who had been featured in all Sumerian releases with the band. Nick Rossi of In Motives was introduced as his replacement. In 2018, Born of Osiris took part in the annual Summer Slaughter Tour, supporting Between the Buried and Me. Born of Osiris went back on tour in the fall of 2018, supporting Killswitch Engage. Crowbar and Death Ray Vision joined as support.

On November 16, 2018, the band released their second single, "The Accursed", from their fifth studio album, The Simulation. The album was released on January 11, 2019. It was said to be the first of two Born of Osiris albums planned for release in 2019, though the second album was not released that year as announced. On February 7, 2019, the band embarked on an approximately one month-long tour to support The Simulation with Chelsea Grin, Make Them Suffer and Kingdom of Giants. Born of Osiris returned to Australia in June 2019, co-headlining with Chelsea Grin. Diamond Construct joined as support.

On May 7, 2020, former lead guitarist Jason Richardson revealed that, after over nine years of attempting to claim royalty fees for his work on The Discovery, Sumerian Records had paid him the outstanding debt.

=== Angel or Alien, Through Shadows, departure of Buras and McKinney and arrival of Montgomery and Marinaro (2021–present) ===
On March 18, 2021, the band released the new single "White Nile" accompanied by a music video. On May 13, 2021, the band released a new single and music video, "Angel or Alien", and announced the release of a new album with the same name for July 2, 2021.

Born of Osiris started writing a follow-up album to Angel or Alien as early as February in 2021. On August 16, 2023, the band released a new single, "Torchbearer", followed by "A Mind Short Circuiting" on February 29, 2024.

On March 1, 2024, keyboardist and vocalist Joe Buras announced his departure from the band, citing personal growth and aspirations as his reasons for leaving. On April 24, 2024, the band released another stand-alone single, "Elevate." The band performed on the Mayhem Fest concert tour that summer.

On May 28, 2025, Born of Osiris announced that Lee McKinney had departed the band, leaving Ronnie Canizaro and Cameron Losch as the only members from the classic line up. McKinney wanted to focus on his new band with Tilian Pearson called Dead Air Divine.

Born of Osiris released their seventh studio album, Through Shadows, on July 11 of 2025. The album includes the previously released singles since 2023's "Torchbearer."

On August 21, 2025, guitarist Travis Montgomery and bassist/backing vocalist Dan Marinaro joined the band permanently. Bassist Nick Rossi switched to guitar and keyboards.

In February 2026, the band was announced as part of the lineup for the Louder Than Life music festival in Louisville, scheduled to take place in September. In March, they toured Australia supported by local band Ironstone.

== Musical style and influences ==
AllMusic said that Born of Osiris were a progressive metal band that combined technical death metal with "progressive-tinged hardcore" and metalcore. The band played deathcore early in their career, though they would eventually abandon this style in favor of stronger emphasis on melody and technical proficiency. The band's music employs dual lead guitars and also incorporates elements of psychedelic music with its keyboard work. Vocally, Born of Osiris are known for "stacking and intersecting" screaming and cleans, according to Loudwire. Various elements of the band's instrumentation have drawn comparisons to 1980s heavy metal acts such as Dream Theater, Judas Priest, Iron Maiden, Helloween and Meshuggah. Additionally, the band is known for its incorporation of narratives into its albums.

== Members ==
Current members

- Cameron Losch – drums (2003–present), bass, rhythm guitar (2008–2009)
- Ronnie Canizaro – lead vocals (2003–present)
- Nick Rossi – rhythm guitar (2021–present), keyboards (2024–present), bass (2018–2025), lead guitar (2025)
- Travis Montgomery – lead guitar (2025–present)
- Dan Marinaro – bass, backing vocals (2025–present)

Former members

- Trevor Hurlbert – lead vocals (2003)
- Mike Mancebo – keyboards (2003)
- Joe Phillips – lead guitar (2003–2004)
- Austin Krause – bass (2003–2005)
- Dan Laabs – bass (2005–2007)
- Mike Shanahan – rhythm guitar (2003–2007), lead guitar (2003)
- Joel Negus – lead guitar (2004–2007)
- Matthew C. Pantelis – rhythm guitar (2007–2008)
- Jason Richardson – rhythm guitar (2009–2011)
- David Darocha – bass (2007–2018; session/touring 2021)
- Joe Buras – keyboards, backing vocals (2003–2024)
- Lee McKinney – lead guitar (2008–2025), rhythm guitar (2011–2021), backing vocals (2024–2025)

Former touring musicians

- Tosin Abasi – lead guitar (2009)
- Lee Evans – lead guitar (2009, 2012–2013)
- Scott Carstairs – lead guitar (2025)

Timeline

== Discography ==
Born of Osiris discography
- Studio albums: 7
- Extended plays: 2
- Singles: 26
- Music videos: 15
- Demos: 6

=== Studio albums ===
List of studio albums, with selected chart positions
Title	Album details	Peak chart positions			
Title	Album details	US	US Indie.	US Rock	US Hard Rock
A Higher Place	Released: July 7, 2009; Label: Sumerian; Formats: CD, digital download	73	8	27	10
The Discovery	Released: March 22, 2011; Label: Sumerian; Formats: CD, digital download	87	17	23	6
Tomorrow We Die Alive	Released: August 20, 2013; Label: Sumerian; Formats: CD, LP, digital download	27	8	10	3
Soul Sphere	Released: October 23, 2015; Label: Sumerian; Formats: CD, LP, digital download	67	6	3	2
The Simulation	Released: January 11, 2019; Label: Sumerian; Formats: CD, LP, digital download	—	3	46	13
Angel or Alien	Released: July 2, 2021; Label: Sumerian; Formats: CD, LP, digital download	—	—	—	—
Through Shadows	Released: July 11, 2025; Label: Sumerian; Formats: CD, LP, digital download	—	—	—	—
"—" denotes a recording that did not chart or was not released in that territory.

=== EPs ===
- The New Reign (2007)
- The Eternal Reign (2017)

=== Demos ===
- Your Heart Engraved These Messages (2003) (recorded while known as Diminished)
- Youm Wara Youm (2004) (recorded while known as Your Heart Engraved)
- Rosecrance (2005) (recorded while known as Rosecrance)
- Preview Promo (2006) (demo containing two tracks, "July 4th" (re-recorded version of "Sight and Sounds" from the Rosecrance EP and "New Years Final")
- Narnia (2007) (single song demo which eventually became "The Takeover" featured on the band's The New Reign EP)
- Pre-Production Demo (2008) (4-track demo of instrumentals from A Higher Place)

=== Singles ===
- "Stressed" (2005)
- "HopeYouDie" (2006)
- "Bow Down" (2007)
- "Now Arise" (2009)
- "Recreate" (2011)
- "Follow the Signs" (2012)
- "Machine" (2013)
- "Divergency" (2013)
- "Throw Me in the Jungle" (2015)
- "Resilience" (2015)
- "The Other Half of Me (2016)
- "Illuminate" (2016)
- "Empires Erased" (2017)
- "Glorious Day" (2017)
- "Silence the Echo" (2018)
- "The Accursed" (2018)
- "Cycles of Tragedy" (2019)
- "Under the Gun" (2019)
- "White Nile" (2021)
- "Angel or Alien" (2021)
- "Poster Child" (2021)
- "Shadowmourne" (2021)
- "Oathbreaker" (2021)
- "Torchbearer" (2023)
- "A Mind Short Circuiting" (2024)
- "Elevate" (2024)
- "In Desolation" (2024)

== Music videos ==
Year	Album	Title	Director
2008	The New Reign	"Open Arms to Damnation"	Ori Kairy
2009	A Higher Place	"Now Arise"	David Brodsky
2011	The Discovery	"Recreate"	Andrew Pulaski
2012	The Discovery	"Follow the Signs"	Andrew Pulaski
2013	Tomorrow We Die Alive	"Machine"	—N/a
2013	Tomorrow We Die Alive	"Divergency"	—N/a
2015	Soul Sphere	"Illuminate"	Ramon Boutviseth
2016	Soul Sphere	"The Other Half of Me"	Ramon Boutviseth
2017	The Eternal Reign	"Empires Erased"	Sam Leabo
2018	The Simulation	"The Accursed"	Steven Contreras
2019	The Simulation	"Cycles of Tragedy"	Steven Contreras
2019	The Simulation	"Under the Gun"	—N/a
2021	Angel or Alien	"White Nile"	—N/a
2021	Angel or Alien	"Angel or Alien"	—N/a
2021	Angel or Alien	"Poster Child"	—N/a
