= The New Reign =

EP by Born of Osiris
- Released: October 2, 2007
- Recorded: April–August 2007
- Studios: Keene Machine Studios, North Hollywood, California
- Genres: Technical death metal, deathcore
- Length: 21:31
- Label: Sumerian
- Producer: Michael Keene

Born of Osiris chronology
RoseCrance (2006)	The New Reign (2007)	A Higher Place (2009)

The New Reign is the debut EP by American progressive metalcore band Born of Osiris. It was released on October 2, 2007 through Sumerian Records. The New Reign was written entirely by drummer Cameron Losch when he was 14–16 years old and produced by The Faceless guitarist Michael Keene. It is also the last release by the band with guitarist Matthew C. Pantelis.

In 2021, Joe Smith-Engelhardt of Alternative Press included the album in his list of "30 deathcore albums from the 2000s that define the genre".

== Track listing ==
All tracks are written by Cameron Losch.

Standard edition
No.	Title	Length
1.	"Rosecrance"	2:11
2.	"Empires Erased"	3:26
3.	"Open Arms to Damnation"	2:48
4.	"Abstract Art"	3:14
5.	"The New Reign"	2:22
6.	"Brace Legs"	2:28
7.	"Bow Down"	2:02
8.	"The Takeover"	3:03
Total length:		21:31

== Personnel ==
Born of Osiris

- Ronnie Canizaro - lead vocals
- Matthew C. Pantelis - lead guitar
- Lee McKinney - rhythm guitar
- David Darocha - bass
- Joe Buras - keyboards, backing vocals
- Cameron Losch - drums

Artwork and design

- Ash Avildsen - art direction, photography

Production and recording

- Michael Keene & Pad Demolish - engineer, mastering, mixing, producer
