= Veil of Maya =

American metalcore band

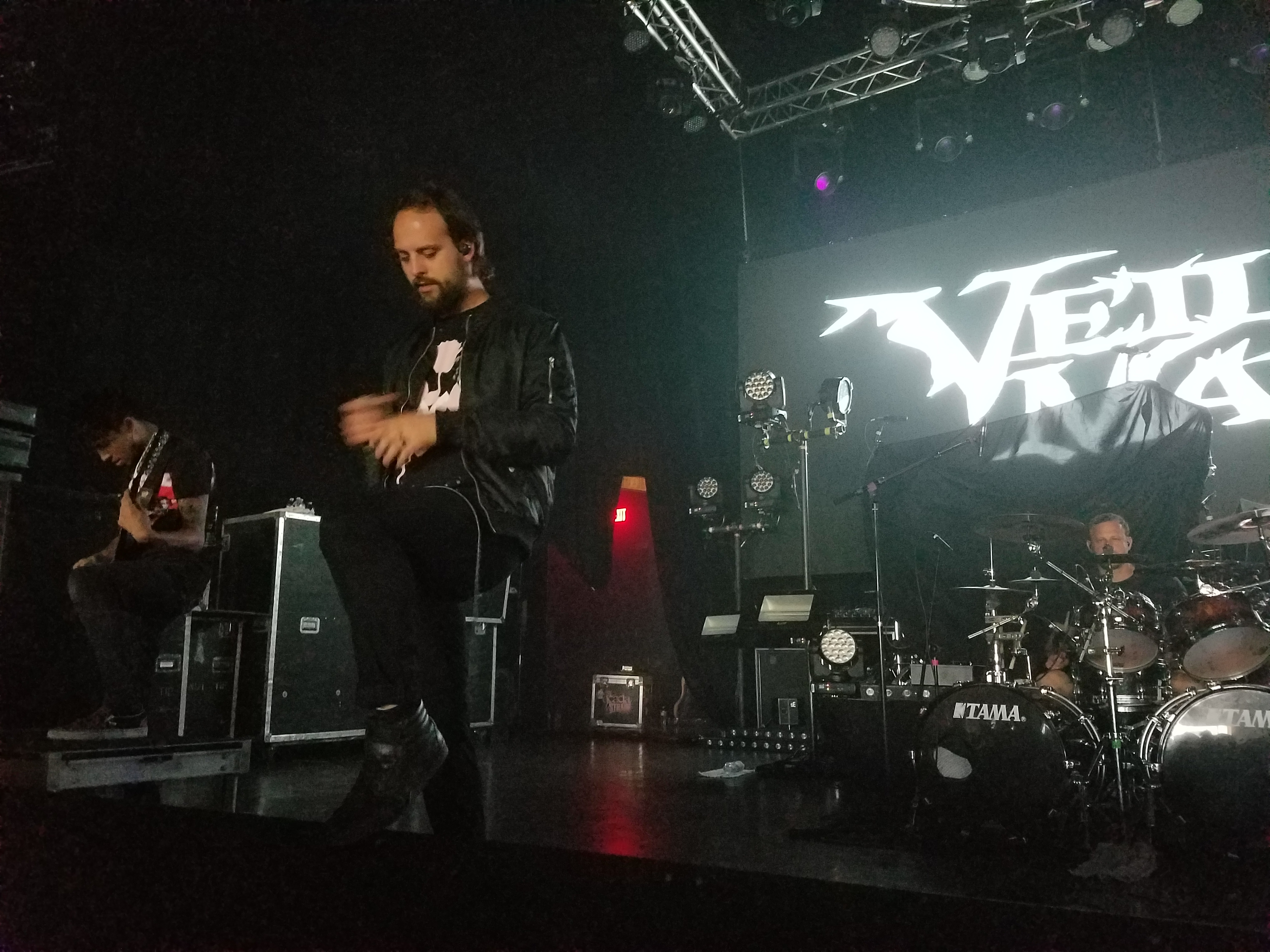
- Veil of Maya performing in 2018

Background information
- Origin: Chicago, Illinois, U.S.
- Genres: Deathcore; djent; progressive metalcore
- Years active: 2004–2024, 2026–present
- Labels: Sumerian; Corrosive
- Members: Marc Okubo; Sam Applebaum; Kristopher Hilger; Adam Clemans
- Past members: Lukas Magyar; Timothy Marshall; Scott Okarma; Bryan Ruppell; Danny Hauser; Matthew C. Pantelis; Brandon Butler

Veil of Maya is an American deathcore band formed in Chicago in 2004. It consists of guitarist Marc Okubo, drummer Sam Applebaum, vocalist Adam Clemans and bassist Kristopher "The Higler" Hilger. They have released seven albums.

== History ==
=== Formation and demo (2004–2006) ===
Veil of Maya formed in 2004 in Chicago, Illinois, after the breakup of melodic death metal band Insurrection, which led members Marc Okubo (lead guitar), Sam Applebaum (drums), and Kristopher "The Higler" Hilger (bassist) to start a new project. Guitarist Timothy Marshall and vocalist Adam joined shortly thereafter.

After recording a self-released demo in 2005, guitarist Scott Okarma briefly joined the group, participating in local shows and early touring. At this point, Veil of Maya were a six-piece band with three guitarists, but this only lasted for a few months before both Marshall and Okarma left the band. Bryan Ruppell replaced them both on rhythm guitar thus reverting their lineup back to five members.

=== All Things Set Aside and The Common Man's Collapse (2006–2009) ===
With this five member line-up, the band recorded, self-produced, and released their debut full-length album All Things Set Aside through Corrosive Recordings on November 7, 2006.

In early 2007 Ruppell left the band and the rest of the members decided not to search for a new rhythm guitarist, leaving Veil of Maya as a four-piece. In September 2007, vocalist Clemans also left the group, leading Veil of Maya to enlist the help of then 20-year-old Brandon Butler, former vocalist of the Indiana metal band Iscariot.

In January 2008, after heightened exposure from interviews and successful tours, Veil of Maya signed with Sumerian Records. Veil of Maya's second album, The Common Man's Collapse was recorded with Butler in 2008 and released the same year. Shortly after the album release, original bassist Kristopher "The Higler" Hilger left the band, and was replaced by Matthew C. Pantelis, formerly of Born of Osiris.

=== Id and Eclipse (2010–2012) ===
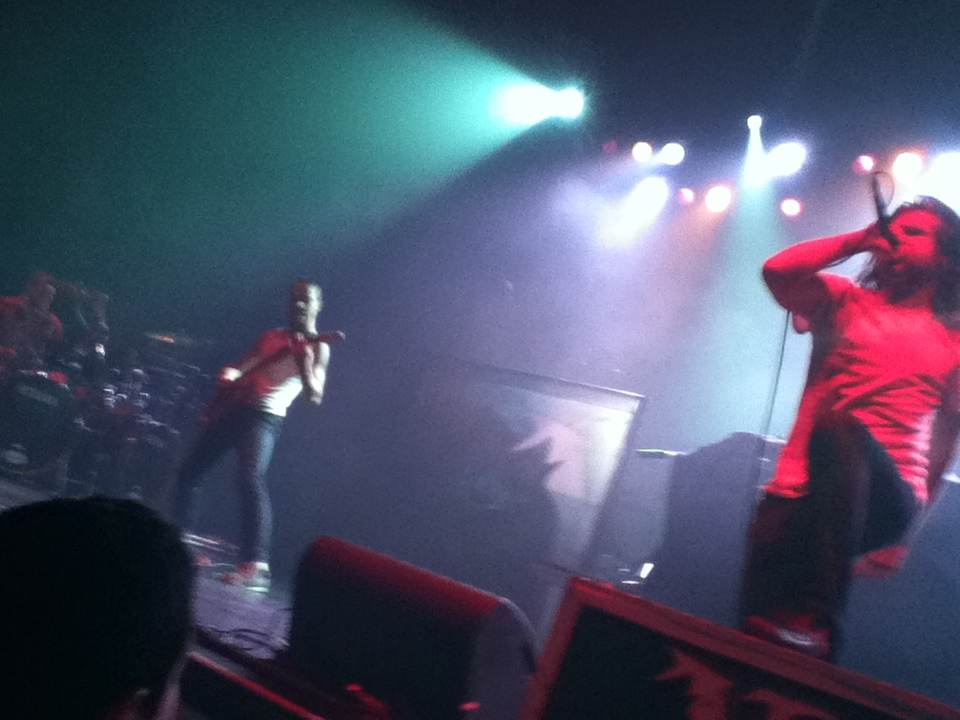
Veil of Maya performing in 2012

After their second album's release, the following several months held extensive touring before the writing and recording for the group's third full-length, Id began. Id was released on April 6, 2010, and reached number 107 on the Billboard 200. The band worked again with producer Michael Keene from The Faceless for this album, who previously produced The Common Man's Collapse. The album itself holds several concepts and references to popular culture, especially television shows.

After the release of Id, Pantelis also left the band, which led to Danny Hauser replacing him in 2010. On January 13, 2012, Sumerian Records released a teaser for Veil of Maya's next album, Eclipse. On January 17, the single "Vicious Circles" was released on the iTunes Store. Eclipse was then released on February 28, 2012 and was produced and co-written by Periphery guitarist Misha Mansoor.

On November 11, 2013 the band released a digital-only single, "Subject Zero", with a lyric video uploaded on YouTube two weeks earlier, on September 30, 2013.

=== Recording of new album and Butler's departure (2013–2014) ===
Veil of Maya announced in 2014 that they had finished writing the follow-up to Eclipse and were recording with Taylor Larson. However, progress was stopped as long-time vocalist Brandon Butler left the band, citing creative differences with his bandmates. Butler moved on to join a band named Lost Origins, which features former members of I Declare War.

=== Magyar's arrival and Matriarch (2014–2016) ===
In 2014, Veil of Maya performed at Knotfest with new vocalist Lukas Magyar, who later officially joined the band on January 1, 2015. At the same time, the band released a new single, "Phoenix".

Shortly after the announcement, the band went on the "Slow Your Troll and Know Your Role" tour with Upon a Burning Body, Volumes, Gideon and The Last Ten Seconds of Life. They also took part in the Ashes to Ashes European Tour with Chelsea Grin, Oceans Ate Alaska and Black Tongue (Black Tongue pulled out within the first few shows due to an injury sustained by frontman Alex Teyen).

On March 23, 2015, Veil of Maya officially announced the release of a new album, Matriarch, and released a new single, "Mikasa". The album was released on May 12, 2015, through Sumerian Records. It was the band's first release with Magyar, and represents somewhat of a departure from the style of previous releases, focused less on technicality and more on clean singing, replacing growling with hardcore-style screaming.

=== False Idol, Mother and hiatus (2017–2026) ===
On September 13, 2017, the band released a music video "Overthrow" on YouTube, and announced the album False Idol for October 20, 2017. The music video for the band's second single "Doublespeak" was added to YouTube on October 3, 2017.

On September 12, 2019, they released the single "Members Only" off a future unknown album. On May 3, 2020, the band released a music video for the single "Outsider" and an animated music video for their single "Viscera" on February 27, 2021, from the presumed unannounced album. On October 6, 2021, their single "Outrun" was uploaded to YouTube as a music video.

On April 20, 2022, the band released the single, "Synthwave Vegan". On February 8, 2023, the band unveiled a second single "Godhead" and its corresponding music video. On March 7, 2023, the band premiered the third single "Red Fur" with a music video. At the same time, they officially announced that their upcoming seventh studio album, Mother, is set for release on May 12, 2023, while also revealing the album cover and the track list. On April 12, one month before the album release, the band published the fourth single "Mother, Pt. 4" along with a music video. The music video for "Disco Kill Party" was released May 12, 2023, coinciding with the album release.

On September 19, 2024, the band announced they would be going on hiatus to "reassess our future". Marc Okubo had joined Falling in Reverse as their rhythm guitarist that same year.

On December 29, 2025, Lukas announced he had left the band to focus on his new project, SIFYN.

=== Original lineup reunion and All Things Set Aside re-recording (2026–present) ===
On November 17, 2026, the band announced the release of a re-recorded version of their debut album All Things Set Aside. They teased a preorder for November 20, 2026.

== Musical style ==
Veil of Maya's early work is generally considered deathcore. Their third and fourth albums Id (2010) and Eclipse (2012) blended the genre with metalcore and djent. Their later work, beginning with the album Matriarch, discarded their deathcore roots and continued their metalcore and djent direction, even being labelled progressive metalcore.

== Band members ==
Current

- Marc Okubo – lead guitar (2004–2024, 2026–present); rhythm guitar (2007–2024, 2026–present); programming (2014–2024, 2026–present)
- Sam Applebaum – drums (2004–2024, 2026–present)
- Adam Clemans - vocals (2004-2007, 2026-present)
- Kristopher "The Higler" Hilger - bass (2004-2009, 2026-present)

Former

- Timothy Marshall – rhythm guitar (2004–2006)
- Scott Okarma – guitars (2006)
- Bryan Ruppell – rhythm guitar (2006–2007)
- Brandon Butler – vocals (2007–2014)
- Matthew C. Pantelis – bass (2009–2010)
- Lukas Magyar – vocals (2014–2024)
- Danny Hauser – bass (2010–2024)

== Discography ==
=== Studio albums ===
List of studio albums, with selected details and chart positions
Title	Album details	Peak chart positions				
Title	Album details	US	US Heat	US Indie	US Hard Rock	US Rock
All Things Set Aside	Release date: November 7, 2006; Label: Corrosive	—	—	—	—	—
The Common Man's Collapse	Release date: April 1, 2008; Label: Sumerian	—	—	—	—	—
Id	Release date: April 6, 2010; Label: Sumerian	107	1	16	7	33
Eclipse	Release date: February 28, 2012; Label: Sumerian	76	—	7	3	19
Matriarch	Release date: May 12, 2015; Label: Sumerian	58	—	3	2	5
False Idol	Release date: October 20, 2017; Label: Sumerian	67	—	5	3	8
[m]other	Release date: May 12, 2023; Label: Sumerian	—	—	—	—	—

=== Singles ===
List of singles
Title	Year	Album
"Vicious Circles"	2012	Eclipse
"Subject Zero"	2013	Non-album single
"Phoenix"	2015	Matriarch
"Mikasa"	2015	Matriarch
"Teleute"	2015	Matriarch
"Overthrow"	2017	False Idol
"Doublespeak"	2017	False Idol
"Members Only"	2019	Non-album singles
"Outsider"	2020	Non-album singles
"Viscera"	2021	Non-album singles
"Outrun"	2021	Non-album singles
"Synthwave Vegan"	2022	Mother
"Godhead"	2023	Mother
"Red Fur"	2023	Mother
"Mother, Pt. 4"	2023	Mother

== Videography ==
Title	Year	Director	Album
"It's Not Safe to Swim Today"	2009	Andrew Palaski	The Common Man's Collapse
"Unbreakable"	2010	Raul Gonzo	Id
"20/200 // Divide Paths"	2013	Unknown	Eclipse
"Mikasa"	2015	Ramon Boutviseth	Matriarch
"Aeris"	2015	Ramon Boutviseth	Matriarch
"Overthrow"	2017	Erez Bader / West Webb	False Idol
"Doublespeak"	2017	Erez Bader / West Webb	False Idol
"Whistleblower"	2017	Erez Bader / West Webb	False Idol
"Outsider"	2020	Orie McGinness	Non-album singles
"Viscera"	2021	Marco Pavone	Non-album singles
"Outrun"	2021	Unknown	Non-album singles
"Synthwave Vegan"	2022	Eric DiCarlo	Mother
"Godhead"	2023	Bryan Caudill	Mother
"Red Fur"	2023	Bryan Caudill	Mother
"Mother, Pt. 4"	2023	Bryan Caudill	Mother
"Disco Kill Party"	2023	Bryan Caudill / Tommy Hayden	Mother
