= Djent =

Subgenre of progressive metal music

- Stylistic origins: Progressive metal
- Cultural origins: Mid-1990s Sweden, late 2000s and early 2010s England and United States
- Typical instruments: Electric guitar; bass; drums; vocals; synthesizers

Subgenres
- Thall

Regional scenes
- Australia; Brazil; Europe; United States

Other topics
- List of djent bands; mathcore; technical death metal; math rock

Djent (/dʒɛnt/) is a subgenre of progressive metal, termed for an onomatopoeia of the guitar sound that characterizes it. While sources such as The Guardian and Guitar World describe djent as a genre, some notable musicians including Randy Blythe (Lamb of God) and Stephen Carpenter (Deftones) say it is not.

== Development ==
Fredrik Thordendal, lead guitarist of Swedish band Meshuggah, coined the term in 2011. In a 2018 interview by Rauta, Meshuggah guitarist Mårten Hagström apologized for the band's role in creating the "djent" style of guitar playing, calling it "a drunk misunderstanding".

Other bands important in the development of the style are Animals as Leaders, Periphery, Tesseract, Monuments and Textures, with Periphery and Animals as Leaders both emerging at the beginning of the coining of the phrase "Djent" and both hailing from the Washington DC Suburban area.

The scene has grown rapidly, and members of the original online community, including the bands Chimp Spanner and Sithu Aye have gone on to tour and release albums commercially. Other bands influenced by djent include A Life Once Lost, Veil of Maya, Vildhjarta, Xerath, and Uneven Structure. Born of Osiris have also been described as being inspired by the djent movement. Furthermore, Hacktivist and DVSR are djent bands that use rapping as a primary vocal style.

== Characteristics ==
Guitar playthrough of a song in the style of djent.

Djent as a style is characterized by progressive, rhythmic, and technical complexity accompanied by a use of polymetric groove. An example is the song "Cafo" by Animals as Leaders. It typically features heavily-distorted, palm-muted guitar chords, syncopated riffs, and poly-meters alongside virtuosic solos. Another common feature is the use of extended range guitars that are seven-string, eight-string, and nine-string, or even more strings.

Metal Injection stated that tropes of the genre include "nouns" band names and neon artwork.

== Reception ==
Bands such as Tesseract and Animals as Leaders have received positive critical reception and multiple awards. Post-metal band Rosetta is noted as saying, "Maybe we should start calling doom metal 'DUNNN'". In response to a question about "djent", Lamb of God vocalist Randy Blythe stated in 2011, "There is no such thing as 'djent'; it's not a genre". Deftones guitarist Stephen Carpenter similarly opined in 2016 that "I thoroughly can get djent, I even have great appreciation for the bands, and I mean Meshuggah is one of my favorite bands. But it's just not a genre. It's just metal". In an interview with Guitar Messenger, Periphery guitarist Misha Mansoor said:

I was looking for gear that was djenty. I was like: 'Are these pickups djenty?' For some reason it caught on, but completely in the wrong way, because people think it's a style of music and they think it's a style of music I play.

In a later interview with Freethinkers Blog, Mansoor stated that he felt djent had become "this big umbrella term for any sort of progressive band, and also any band that will [use] off-time chugs [...] You also get bands like Scale the Summit [who are referred to as] a djent band [when] 80% of their stuff sounds like clean channel, and it's all beautiful and pretty, you know [...] In that way, I think it's cool because it groups really cool bands together [...] We are surrounded by a lot of bands that I respect, but at the same time, I don't think people know what djent is either [...] It's very unclear". Later in the interview, he stated, "If you call us djent, that's fine. I mean, I would never self-apply the term, but at the same time, it's just so vague that I don't know what to make of it". In 2023, Periphery directly referenced the term's controversy with the subtitle of their seventh studio album, Periphery V: Djent is not a Genre (2023). In a 2026 interview, the band's guitarist Misha Mansoor stated that the name was a joke and that, in his opinion, djent "is absolutely a genre".

Tosin Abasi of Animals as Leaders takes a more lenient view of the term, stating that there are specific characteristics that are common to djent bands, and as a result the term can be legitimately used as a genre. While stating that he personally strives not to subscribe exclusively to any one genre, he makes the point that a genre is defined by the ability to associate common features between different artists. He says that in this way, it is possible to view djent as a genre describing a particular niche of modern progressive metal.

== See also ==
- List of djent bands
