= Sumerian Records =

American record label

- Founded: 2006; 20 years ago
- Founder: Ash Avildsen
- Distributor: Virgin Music Group
- Genre: Metalcore; post-hardcore; electronicore; heavy metal; progressive rock; electronica; alternative rock; country
- Country of origin: United States
- Location: Nashville, Tennessee
- Official website: sumerianrecords.com

Sumerian Records is an American record label based in Nashville, Tennessee. The company was founded in 2006 by Ash Avildsen. Sumerian has signed artists such as Crosses, Poppy, Bad Omens, Animals as Leaders, and I See Stars. In early 2022, the company acquired Behemoth Entertainment, a comic book and video game publisher, in order to increase their merchandise options and further expand the brand.

== History ==
Founded in 2006 in his Venice Beach apartment, Sumerian Records founder Ash Avildsen first released the records Akeldama by The Faceless and For What It's Worth by Stick to Your Guns in order to let people know the label would be dedicated to underground music but also to diversify the genres of the label, as the former falls under deathcore while the latter is typically described as melodic hardcore. After waiting a year to release another record, in order to ensure a third band on their label was "totally doing their own thing independent from everything else going on in the scene", Sumerian released The New Reign by Born of Osiris. Ash later commented on this release in a 2012 interview with Lambgoat by stating, "There is something to be said for not putting out too many records each year to where we're able to give focused energy to each band and album rather than always having several releases come out each month". Sumerian has continued to follow this philosophy throughout its near two decade tenure, never surpassing more than thirty artists on the label at one time and typically following a one record a month release schedule.

Since its inauguration, Sumerian has had several seminal artists in the rock, emo, and alternative genres perform on late night television, such as Asking Alexandria, I See Stars, Crosses(†††), and Poppy on Jimmy Kimmel, Bones UK on Seth Meyers, and The Smashing Pumpkins on The Tonight Show with Jimmy Fallon.

== Current roster ==
- After the Burial
- Ando San
- Animals as Leaders
- Bad Omens
- Bones UK
- Born of Osiris
- Boundaries
- Carnifex
- Des Rocs
- Diamante
- The Faceless
- Face Yourself
- Gideon
- Holding Absence
- Hollywood Undead
- Imminence
- I See Stars
- Kittie
- Meg Myers
- Nita Strauss
- Palaye Royale
- Poppy
- Saosin
- Seven Hours After Violet
- Slaughter to Prevail
- Starbenders
- Static Dress
- The Pretty Wild
- Roman Candle
- Through Fire
- Vana
- Veil of Maya
- Youth Code

== Charts and sales certifications ==
Sumerian has garnered three RIAA certified gold records. Their first two awards originated from two singles on Asking Alexandria's debut album Stand Up and Scream (2009): "The Final Episode" and "Not The American Average". Their third was Bad Omens' breakthrough single, "Just Pretend" (2022).

In 2014, Sumerian reunited Grammy-winning actor/rapper Ice-T's Body Count and released its highest-selling album in 20+ years, Manslaughter.

In 2018, they released the first true solo album for Jonathan Davis, lead singer of Korn. The lead single for Jonathan's album "What It Is" went Top 5 at Rock Radio which was a first for Jonathan outside of KoRn.

== Achievements and awards ==
In 2010, The Grammy Museum at LA Live had a Golden Gods: History of Heavy Metal Exhibit where the original, band sticker-covered Sony Vaio laptop that founder Ash Avildsen started the label on was displayed as a historical item.

In 2017, Sumerian received its first Grammy nomination for Best Metal Performance for Periphery. That year saw Sumerian also have their first box office theatrical film release in American Satan, which debuted in select AMC theatres across the country and went top 20 in its opening weekend on box office mojo. The movie was picked up by Miramax for distribution and Showtime for first window domestic SVOD in the US and SKY in the UK.

In 2018, Sumerian won the best independent label award at the Metal Hammer Golden Gods in the UK and accepted the award on stage at the O2 in London.

In 2019, they received another "Best Metal Performance" Grammy nomination for Between The Buried And Me. In 2019, Guitar World listed two Sumerian artists in the top four guitarists of the decade, Tosin Abasi of Animals as Leaders and female solo artist Nita Strauss, who in addition to her solo career and being Alice Cooper's guitarist, also plays the national anthem for the home games for the LA Rams at Sofi Stadium and for WWE, most recently at WrestleMania 37.

In 2020, the label received its first Best Rock Performance Grammy nomination for Bones UK.

In 2021, Sumerian received the first-ever Grammy nomination in the history of the Recording Academy for a female solo artist in the Best Metal Performance category for Poppy, who also performed at the premiere ceremony.

== Sumerian Pictures ==
In 2025, Sumerian began distributing films through their new Sumerian Pictures label. Their first release was Queen of the Ring, which was widely released on March 7, 2025.

In February 2026, Sumerian Pictures generated headlines when they acquired the U.S. rights to director Beth de Araújo's sophomore feature Josephine, which had garnered universal critical acclaim and won both the Grand Jury Prize and Audience Award at the 2026 Sundance Film Festival. Sumerian plans to give the film a major theatrical release and an awards campaign.

=== List of films ===
Release date	Title	Notes
March 7, 2025	Queen of the Ring	
April 17, 2026	Mile End Kicks	U.S. distribution only, distributed in Canada by Elevation Pictures
July 17, 2026	Horsegirls	
September 25, 2026	The Incomer	
November 20, 2026	Josephine	

=== Upcoming ===
Release date	Title	Notes
2026	Broken Voices	U.S. distribution
2026	The Wolf, the Fox, and the Leopard	
2027	Low Expectations	
2027	Chili Finger	
TBA	My New Friend Jim	
