= Solipsist (album) =

Studio album by The Zenith Passage
- Released: April 15, 2016
- Studios: Castle Ultimate Productions, Keene Machine Studios
- Genre: Technical death metal
- Length: 39:33
- Label: Unique Leader
- Producers: Zack Ohren, Justin McKinney, Michael Keene

The Zenith Passage chronology
Cosmic Dissonance (2013)	Solipsist (2016)	Datalysium (2023)

Singles from Solipsist
- 1. "Holographic Principle II: Convergence" Released: June 1, 2017; 2. "Deus Deceptor" Released: March 16, 2016

Professional ratings
Review scores
Source	Rating
Metal Injection	6.5/10

Solipsist is the debut studio album by the American technical death metal band The Zenith Passage. It was released via Unique Leader Records on April 15, 2016. It is the band's first release for Unique Leader Records, with whom they signed in 2013. The album focuses on the concept of solipsism. The album features a guest vocal appearance by Fallujah's Alex Hofmann, and guitar solo by Wes Hauch (ex-The Faceless). The cover art was done by Ken Sarafin, who had also worked with Skinless, The Kennedy Veil, and Archspire. Per figures provided by Metal news site MetalInsider, the album sold 720 units in its first week.

A lyric videos was released for the song "Holographic Principle II: Convergence" on January 20, 2016.

On March 14, 2016 the band debuted a lyric video for the song "Deus Deceptor" through MetalSucks.

The band made the album available for streaming in full on April 13, 2016.

The band released a music video for the song "Deus Deceptor" on June 15, 2017.

In a 2018 interview with Casting Metal Podcast, McKinney noted, to some controversy, that Keene's role in the production of the album was extremely limited. According to McKinney, Keene, after collecting money from the band, made no progress on the production on the album for "seven or eight months". As a result, Unique Leader made the band find a new producer for the record, thus the band went with Ohern, who tracked the entire album (with the exception of some vocals tracked by Keene) in a week.

== Release and reception ==
Metal Injection reviewer Nate gave the album a 6.5 / 10 score. He referred to the album as a "technical death metal gem", but lambasted it for its similarities to The Faceless' Planetary Duality, referring to the album as "Planetary Duality 2". A professed fan of the band's debut EP Cosmic Dissonance, the reviewer noted that if every song were as original as "Deus Deceptor", the album would be "unforgettable", but finalized his review by calling the album a "doppelgänger of a 2008 album".

Heavy Metal blog "Angry Metal Guy" gave the album a 3.0 / 5.0. He praised the production quality of the record, but drew immediate parallels between the sound of Solipsist and that of The Faceless' first two albums, going so far as to call the band a "copycat act". He noted that the album would likely sound "more like The Faceless than "The Faceless" if the (then) upcoming The Faceless LP In Becoming a Ghost continued down the path of Autotheism, diverging from The Faceless' original sound.

== Track listing ==
No.	Title	Length
1.	"Holographic Principle I: Emergence"	1:07
2.	"Holographic Principle II: Convergence"	3:47
3.	"Simulated Reality"	3:48
4.	"Deus Deceptor"	4:33
5.	"The Dissension Consensus"	4:59
6.	"Dreamsphere"	3:48
7.	"Hypnagogia"	4:07
8.	"Metaphysical Solipsism"	3:01
9.	"The Tenebrous Veil"	4:45
10.	"Luminary Singularity"	5:19
Total length:		39:33

== Personnel ==
The Zenith Passage

- Greg Hampton – vocals
- Justin McKinney – guitars, bass, mixing, engineering
- Rob Maramonte – guitars
- Luis Martinez – drums
