= The Zenith Passage =

American band

- Origin: Los Angeles, California
- Genres: Technical death metal
- Years active: 2012–present
- Labels: Metal Blade Records, Unique Leader Records
- Members: Justin McKinney; Derek Rydquist; Brandon Giffin; Christopher Beattie; Max Sepulveda
- Past members: Greg Hampton; Michael Hoskins; Josh Slater; Luis Martinez; Rob Maramonte; Matthew Paulazzo

The Zenith Passage is an American technical death metal band from Los Angeles, California founded in 2012. They are currently signed to Metal Blade Records. To date they have released one EP, Cosmic Dissonance, and two LPs, Solipsist and Datalysium.

They are closely linked with fellow Los Angeles metal band The Faceless. The Zenith Passage's Justin McKinney joined The Faceless to play guitar in 2015, replacing Wes Hauch, who had played on The Zenith Passage's debut album. Derek "Demon Carcass" Rydquist and Brandon Giffin, who had played on The Faceless's first two albums (Akeldama and Planetary Duality), joined The Zenith Passage in 2021.

The band went on tour as part of MetalSucks Devastation of the Nation tour, supporting Cryptopsy and Decrepit Birth.

== History ==
The Zenith Passage started in 2012 as collaboration between friends Justin McKinney and Greg Hampton. After releasing a one track demo in February 2012, the band released their debut EP Cosmic Dissonance on January 29, 2013. The band signed a multi-album deal with Unique Leader Records on June 24, 2013.

Ex-Fallujah and All Shall Perish guitarist Rob Maramonte had joined the band in 2013. The album sold 1850 units in its first week.

On April 16, 2016, the band released their debut LP, Solipsist, on Unique Leader Records. It features guest vocals from Fallujah’s Alex Hofmann and a guitar solo by Wes Hauch (ex-The Faceless). For the album, the band produced its first music video, for the song "Deus Deceptor".

Drummer Matthew Paulazzo left the band in 2018 to enter film school.

On August 9, 2021, the band released a music video for their new single "Algorithmic Salvation". They also announced the return of drummer Matthew Paulazzo and the addition of new members Derek Rydquist and Brandon Giffin (both formerly of The Faceless) as new vocalist and bassist, respectively.

On December 7, 2022, the band announced they had signed to Metal Blade Records and were in the studio working on two albums. It was also revealed drummer Matthew Paulazzo was once again no longer in the band.

On May 15, 2023, the band announced their new full-length album, Datalysium, would be released on July 21, 2023. The announcement was accompanied by the release of a single from the album, "Lexicontagion". A second single, "Divinertia II", and an accompanying music video, were released on June 14, 2023.

== Band members ==
=== Current ===
- Justin McKinney – guitars, programming, synthesizers, orchestrations, backing vocals (2012–present), bass guitar (2012–2013, 2014–2021), drums (2022–2023)
- Derek Rydquist – vocals (2021–present)
- Brandon Giffin – bass guitar (2021–present)
- Christopher Beattie – guitars (2022–present)
- Max Sepulveda – drums (2024–present)

=== Former ===
- Greg Hampton – vocals (2012–2021)
- Rob Maramonte – guitars (2013–2022)
- Luis Martinez – drums (2013–2016)
- Michael Hoskins – bass guitar (2013–2014)
- Matthew Paulazzo – drums (2016–2018, 2021–2022, live 2023–2024)

=== Live ===
- Mike Caputo – drums (2018)
- Chason Westmoreland – drums (2023)
- Geoffrey Ficco – vocals (2024)
- James Dorton – vocals (2024)

== Discography ==
=== Studio albums ===
- Solipsist (2016)
- Datalysium (2023)

=== EPs ===
- Cosmic Dissonance (2013)
- Cosmic Dissonance (Remastered) (2018)

==== Singles ====
- "Algorithmic Salvation" (2021)
- "Synaptic Depravation" (2022)
- "Fleshbound Reliquary" (2025)
