= Alone (Evan Brewer album) =

Studio album by Evan Brewer
- Released: June 28, 2011
- Genres: Progressive rock, instrumental rock, jazz fusion
- Length: 27:30
- Label: Sumerian

Evan Brewer chronology
Alone (2011)	Your Itinerary (2013)

Professional ratings
Review scores
Source	Rating
Revolver	link

Alone is the debut album from bassist Evan Brewer of The Faceless and Animosity, the album solely features bass guitar playing. The artwork was made by the Colombian drummer and graphic designer Mauro Mazuera.

== Track listing ==
No.	Title	Length
1.	"Actualize"	4:19
2.	"Contraband"	2:46
3.	"Currency"	3:53
4.	"Altered Perspective One"	2:41
5.	"Altered Perspective Two"	2:24
6.	"Vertigo"	2:46
7.	"The Decline"	0:15
8.	"Degenerate"	2:11
9.	"Looking West"	2:37
10.	"A Climate For Change"	3:38
Total length:		27:30

== Personnel ==
Evan Brewer

- Evan Brewer - Bass, Mixing, Mastering
