= Entheos =

American progressive death metal band

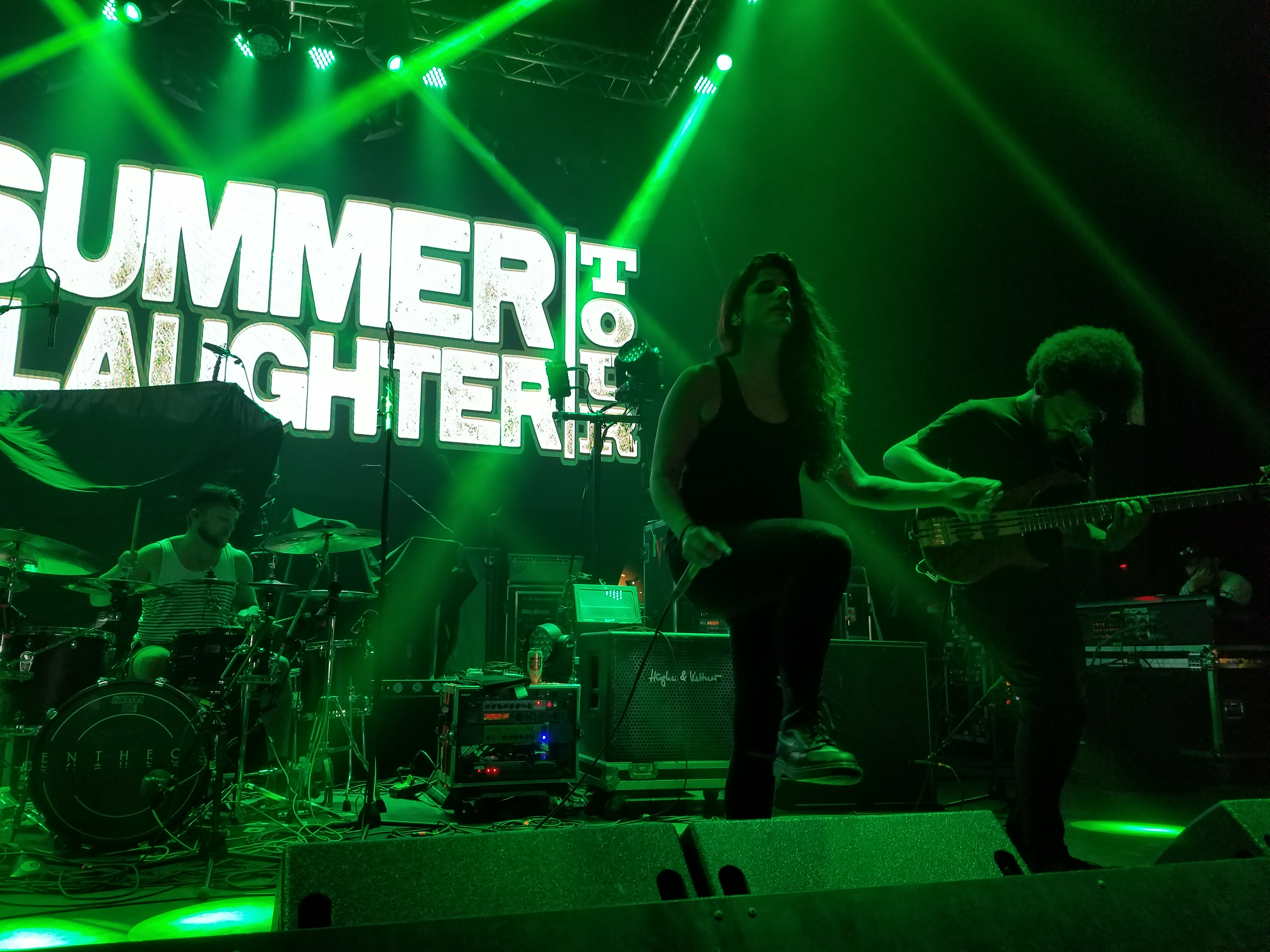

Background information
- Origin: Santa Cruz, California, U.S.
- Genres: Technical death metal, progressive metal, deathcore, djent
- Years active: 2015–present
- Labels: Spinefarm, Artery, Metal Blade
- Members: Navene Koperweis; Chaney Crabb; Michael Stancel; Scott Carstairs
- Past members: Evan Brewer; Frank Costa; Malcolm Pugh; Travis LeVrier
- Website: facebook.com/entheosband

Entheos is an American progressive death metal band formed in Santa Cruz, California in 2015 by ex-members of Animosity, Animals as Leaders, and The Faceless. They released their debut EP Primal in March 2015 and their debut album The Infinite Nothing in April 2016. The band announced their return to the studio in March 2017 and released Dark Future in November of the same year.

== History ==
Entheos was formed by drummer Navene Koperweis, vocalist Chaney Crabb, bassist Evan Brewer, and ex-Animosity guitarist Frank Costa in early 2015. Crabb's vocal prowess rose to prominence after her vocal audition video for Veil of Maya's vacant singer spot went viral.

After their initial lineup was solidified, the band posted a series of studio update teaser videos to their Facebook page. The band posted the album artwork and release date for an upcoming work on February 25, 2015. Their debut EP, Primal - EP on March 15, 2015. Preceding the official release, the band posted the entirety of Primal to their BandCamp on March 12, 2015.

On November 2, 2015, Entheos announced that guitarist Frank Costa had departed the band due to "things in his life that need to be taken care of, which we feel cannot be achieved while being involved in this project." In the same statement the band announced that guitarist Malcom Pugh had joined the band to replace Costa.

On May 5, 2015, the band posted a video to their Facebook page, announcing that they were already recording music for a new release.

On April 1, 2016, the band released their debut album The Infinite Nothing.

On June 2, 2016, Entheos announced via their Facebook page that Malcom Pugh had departed the band. In the same post, the band announced that former Scale the Summit guitarist Travis LeVrier had joined the band on a permanent basis. The band also posted a play-through video of LeVrier performing "An Ever-Expanding Human" to their Facebook page, and Artery Recordings' YouTube channel.

On March 14, 2017, Navene Koperweis announced via his Facebook page that the band had returned to the studio again. The Entheos Facebook page additionally posted a video depicting studio work with the hashtag "lp2".

On September 7, 2017, Entheos announced the release date for their new, and second album Dark Future. The album was released on November 10, 2017 through Spinefarm Records. To promote the album they released a single "The World Without Us".

Entheos announced on January 21, 2019, that Evan Brewer was departing the band.

The band released a new single, "Remember You Are Dust" on March 18, 2020. This came along with an announcement that Travis LeVrier was no longer a member of the band and that going forward Navene Koperweis would be writing and recording all the drums, guitars and bass in the studio.

In May 2021, Entheos announced that they were signed to Metal Blade Records and are expected to release their third album in early 2022.

On April 5, 2022, Entheos announced that they had completed work on their third album and it was currently being mixed by Mark Lewis, with plans on releasing it later in 2022 via Metal Blade Records. The band also announced the return of Evan Brewer on bass for the new album on a studio-only basis, as well as their tour supporting Archspire on the Tech Trek V tour through mid-May 2022. Lastly, the band announced the addition of Brian James (ex-Fallujah) and Robert Brown (ex-Slaughter to Prevail) on guitars as part of their 2022 live lineup.

== Band members ==
Current

- Navene Koperweis – drums, synthesizers (2015–present), guitars (2020–2025), bass (2019–2022)
- Chaney Crabb – lead vocals (2015–present)
- Michael Stancel – rhythm guitar, backing vocals (2025–present; touring 2024-2025)
- Scott Carstairs – lead guitar, backing vocals (2025–present; touring 2024-2025)

Former

- Evan Brewer – bass (2015–2019; session 2022–present)
- Frank Costa – lead guitar (2015)
- Malcolm Pugh – lead guitar (2015-2016)
- Travis LeVrier – lead guitar (2016–2020)

Touring

- Tim Walker – bass (2019–2020)
- Brian James – lead guitar (2022–2024)
- Robert Brown – rhythm guitar (2022–2024)
- Andrew Virrueta – lead guitar (2024)

Timeline

== Discography ==
=== Albums ===
List of studio albums, with selected chart positions
Year	Album details	Peak chart positions	
Year	Album details	US Indie	US Hard Rock
2016	The Infinite Nothing: Released: April 1, 2016; Label: Artery Recordings	49	24
2017	Dark Future: Released: November 10, 2017; Label: Spinefarm	31	26
2023	Time Will Take Us All: Released: March 3, 2023; Label: Metal Blade Records	—	—
2026	Empty on the Inside: Released: October 23, 2026; Label: Metal Blade Records	—	—
"—" denotes a recording that did not chart.

=== EPs ===
- Primal (March 15, 2015)
- An End to Everything (October 25, 2024)

=== Singles ===
- "Remember You Are Dust" (March 17, 2020)
- "Empty on the Inside" (October 16, 2025)
