= List of Sumerian Records artists =

This is a list of current and former bands of Sumerian Records, an American independent record label specializing in heavy-metal music. The company is based in Washington, D.C.; and Los Angeles, California.

== Roster ==
=== Current ===
- After the Burial
- Alexis Munroe
- Animals as Leaders
- Bad Omens
- Bones UK
- Borgore (North America only)
- Born of Osiris
- CHON
- Dead Posey
- Des Rocs
- DIAMANTE
- Drag Me Out
- DRÆMINGS
- Danny Worsnop
- Evan Brewer
- Holding Absence
- Hollywood Undead
- The Francesco Artusato Project
- The Faceless
- The HAARP Machine
- Imminence
- I See Stars
- The Kindred
- Lesser
- Meg Myers
- Mestís
- Native Howl
- Night Riots
- Nita Strauss
- Oceano
- Palaye Royale
- American Satan (The Relentless)
- Poppy
- Pretty Sister
- Sace6
- Slaughter to Prevail
- Smashing Pumpkins
- Starbenders
- Through Fire
- T.R.A.M.
- Vana
- Veil of Maya
- Within Destruction
- Youth Code

=== Former ===
- ABACABB (disbanded 2010)
- Agraceful (disbanded 2010)
- Asking Alexandria (active; on Better Noise Records)
- Betraying The Martyrs (active; on Out of Line Music)
- Between the Buried and Me (active; on Inside Out Music)
- Bizzy Bone (active)
- Blackguard (active; on Nuclear Blast and Victory Records)
- Body Count (active; on Century Media Records)
- Broadcast the Nightmare (disbanded 2009; unsigned)
- Circle of Contempt (active; unsigned)
- City in the Sea
- Come The Dawn (changed name to American Sin, inactive)
- Conducting from the Grave (disbanded 2016)
- ††† (Crosses) (active; on Warner Records)
- Dayshell
- Dead Letter Circus (North America only)
- The Dillinger Escape Plan (disbanded 2017)
- Enfold Darkness (active; on The Artisan Era)
- ERRA (active; on UNFD)
- Fellsilent (disbanded 2010)
- Fever Dreamer
- I, the Breather
- Lower Than Atlantis (disbanded May 2019)
- Make Me Famous (disbanded 2012)
- Miss Fortune (Active, Unsigned)
- Night Riots (disbanded 2020)
- Periphery (active; on 3 Dot Recordings)
- Sea of Treachery (active; unsigned)
- September Mourning (active; unsigned)
- Sleeping With Sirens (active; on Rise Records)
- Soreption (active; on Unique Leader Records)
- Stick to Your Guns (active; on Pure Noise Records)
- Stray From The Path (active; on UNFD)
- Structures (active)
- Upon A Burning Body (active; on Seek and Strike Records)
- Black Veil Brides (active; on Spinefarm Records)
- Weathers (active; unsigned)

== Sphinx City Records ==
- Bizzy Bone

== See also ==
- List of record labels
- Music of the United States
