= Atlas Drugged =

Atlus Drugged

Studio album by Look What I Did
- Released: February 9, 2010
- Studio: Stagg Street Studios, Los Angeles
- Genre: Post-hardcore; progressive rock; pop-punk
- Length: 42:24
- Label: Modernist Movement
- Producer: Brian Virtue

Look What I Did chronology
Minuteman for the Moment (2005)	Atlus Drugged (2010)	Zanzibar III: Analog Prison (2014)

Professional ratings
Review scores
Source	Rating
Blabbermouth.net	9/10

Atlas Drugged is the third studio album by Look What I Did. It was released on February 9, 2010 through Modernist Movement.

== Musical style ==
Atlas Drugged has been described as a post-hardcore, progressive rock, and pop-punk album with elements of dream pop and psychedelic rock.

Before the album's release, vocalist Barry Donegan stated Atlas Drugged would "be a little more accessible than Minuteman," with a tone he described as "heavy psychiatric drug use being done by everybody."

== Release and promotion ==
Four music videos were released to promote Atlas Drugged. The first, for "Fade to Daft", was released on January 10, 2010. The video for "I'm Majoring in Psychology" was released the following month on February 9, the same day Atlas Drugged was released. A video was released for "Serf Song", featuring Stevie Bailey from Christine, on May 9. The fourth and final video, for "Pussy Comitatus", was released on October 11, 2011.

On June 1, 2010, Atlas Drugged was made available for streaming in its entirety on the band's MySpace page to coincide with a summer tour with Psychostick.

== Track listing ==
All tracks are written by Look What I Did.

No.	Title	Length
1.	"Six Flags Over Jesus"	3:03
2.	"Fade to Daft"	3:23
3.	"Jekyll Island Fiat Scratch"	3:21
4.	"Holding Pattern"	2:19
5.	"I'm Majoring in Psychology"	2:24
6.	"My Girlfriend, Leo Strauss"	3:03
7.	"Serf Song" (featuring Stevie Bailey)	3:19
8.	"Shit $"	3:16
9.	"Pussy Comitatus"	4:42
10.	"Quit It"	3:19
11.	"Haematospermia"	3:17
12.	"Baby Darwins"	6:52

== Personnel ==
Adapted from AllMusic:

Look What I Did

- Barry Donegan – lead vocals
- Christopher Bradley – guitar, backing vocals, keyboards, samples, vocal production
- Aaron "Skeet" Childress – guitar
- Tyrone Coughlin – bass, vocal production
- Jake Omen – drums

Additional

- Stevie Bailey – additional vocals (track 7)
- Brian Virtue – producer, mixing, engineer
- Jard Cain – artwork
