= Navene Koperweis =

American drummer

- Navene Koperweis playing with Entheos in 2018

Background information
- Also known as: Navene K, Navene-k
- Born: May 31, 1985 (age 41); San Jose, California, U.S.
- Origin: San Francisco, California, U.S.
- Genres: Progressive metal, djent, Hardcore punk, deathcore, technical death metal, dubstep, electronica
- Occupations: Musician, producer
- Instruments: Drums, guitar
- Member of: Entheos, Fleshwrought
- Formerly of: Animals as Leaders, Animosity, The Faceless, Hoods

Navene Koperweis (born May 31, 1985) is an American drummer, best known as the former drummer of Animosity, Hoods and Animals as Leaders. He currently plays for Entheos, and serves as session drummer for Job for a Cowboy and also Machine Head.

Koperweis started drumming when he was eleven years old. He has played for The Faceless, and runs his technical death metal project, Fleshwrought, where he plays all instruments. He is also a dubstep/electronica producer, and has released an electronic EP, Human Design, under the name Navene K.

His influences include Tim Alexander, Joey Jordison, Kevin Talley, John Longstreth, Terry Bozzio, Skrillex, Noisia, and Deadmau5.

== Discography ==
=== Hoods ===
- Prey for Death (2003)
- Hoods/Freya (2004)

=== Animosity ===
- Shut It Down (2003)
- Empires (2005)
- Animal (2007)

=== The Faceless ===
- Akeldama (track #4 only; 2006)

=== Fleshwrought ===
- Dementia/Dyslexia (2010)

=== Animals as Leaders ===
- Weightless (2011)
- The Joy of Motion (production; 2014)

=== Navene K ===
- Human Design (EP; 2012)
- "Tear It Up" (Single; 2013)
- "Night Movement" (Single; 2014)
- "Warrior / Secret Police" (Single; 2014)
- Mind (EP; 2014)

=== Evan Brewer ===
- Your Itinerary (2013)

=== Entheos ===
- Primal EP (2015)
- The Infinite Nothing (2016)
- Dark Future (2017)
- Time Will Take Us All (2023)
- Empty on the Inside (2026)

=== An Endless Sporadic ===
- Magic Machine (2016)

=== Job for a Cowboy ===
- Moon Healer (2024)

=== The Minerva Conduct ===
- "The Minerva Conduct" (2017)

=== Whitechapel ===
- The Valley (2019)

=== Machine Head ===
- Circle the Drain (2020) (stand-alone single)
- My Hands Are Empty (2020) (stand-alone single)
- Arrows in Words from the Sky (2021) (EP)
- Of Kingdom and Crown (2022)
