= Evan Brewer =

American bassist (born 1981)

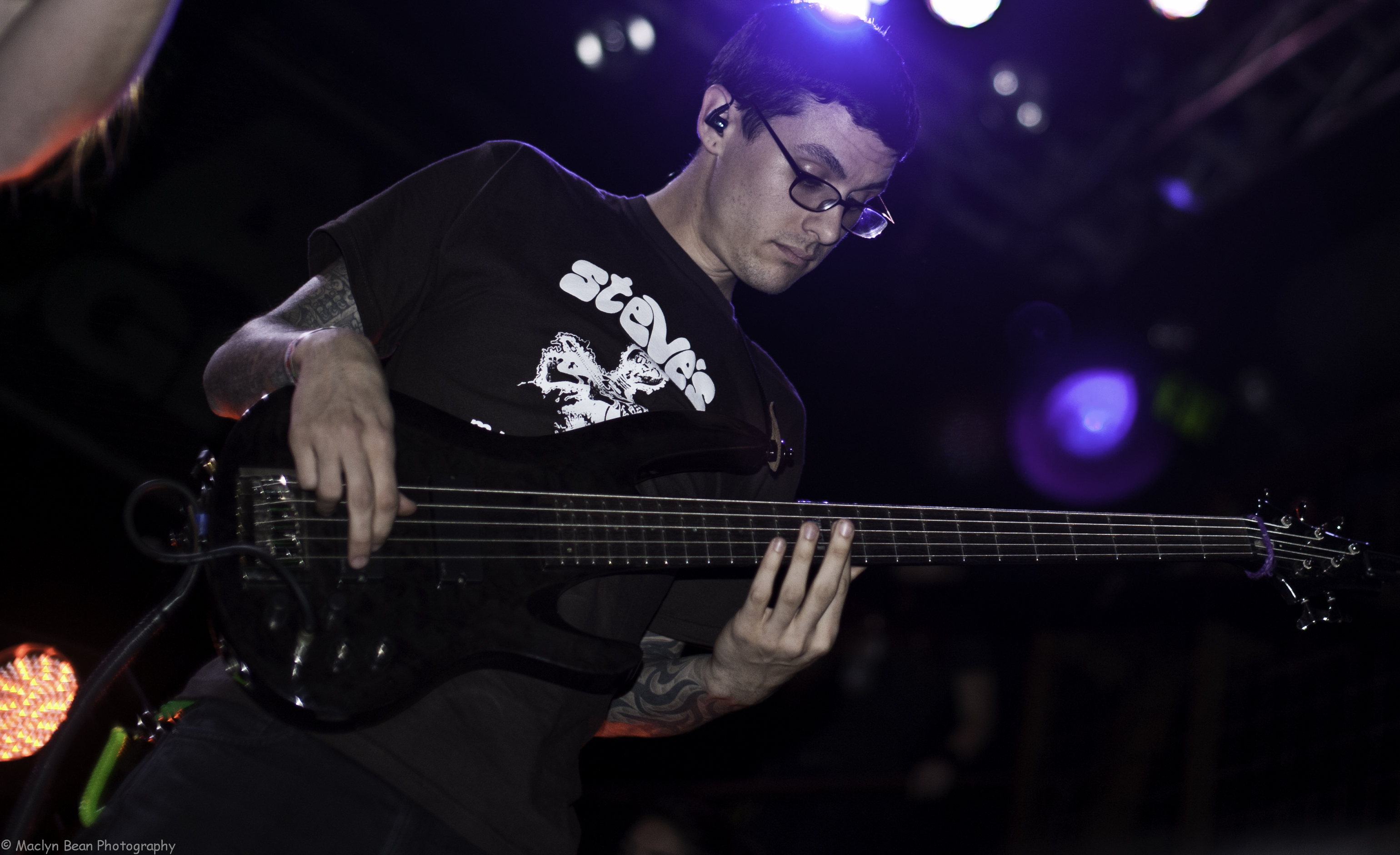
- Brewer performing with The Faceless in 2012

Background information
- Born: September 23, 1981 (age 45); Nashville, Tennessee, U.S.
- Genres: Progressive metal, technical death metal, deathgrind, metalcore
- Instrument: Bass guitar
- Label: Sumerian
- Member of: Fallujah, Look What I Did
- Formerly of: Entheos, The Faceless, Animosity

Evan Brewer (born September 23, 1981) is an American musician from Nashville, Tennessee. He is the current bassist of Fallujah and formerly played bass for The Faceless and Entheos. He has also been involved in other bands such as Reflux and was the last bassist to be a part of Animosity. He also released two solo albums under his own name. In 2011, he released his debut solo album titled Alone, and his second solo album, Your Itinerary, was released on July 16, 2013.

== Biography ==
He is a former member of Animosity and Reflux, which also featured guitarist Tosin Abasi and Ash Avildsen (CEO of Sumerian Records). He has a project called Climaxes with Barry Donegan of Look What I Did and Alex Rüdinger of The Faceless, which is currently in the writing process according to MTV.COM Metal File. They have currently only released two songs; "Clock In & Die" and "Meet Me There". He has also filled in for A Life Once Lost and Terror on tour. In early 2011, he joined death metal band The Faceless after the departure of Brandon Giffin, who joined Cynic as a touring member. Brewer also has a solo project under his own name, for which he has currently released two albums (Alone and Your Itinerary). All the sounds on Alone were created using a bass guitar, hence the album's title. Your Itinerary has more of a "full band type of feel", with drums, keyboards and electronics. Navene Koperweis (formerly of Animals As Leaders and Animosity) assisted in the production process and created the final mix of the album, as well as providing drums on several tracks. He chose to leave The Faceless in October 2014 to pursue other musical interests, such as recording the Primal EP with technical death metal band Entheos. In September 2020, he joined Nashville-based experimental rock collective Look What I Did.

Brewer is a close friend of Regi Wooten and he states that being around the Wooten brothers and their musical community shaped him radically as a musician.

== Gear ==
Brewer was an endorser of ESP bass guitars. He uses an Ampeg PF-500 head and an Ampeg cabinet for amplification. For effects, Brewer uses a rackmounted Line 6 Pod unit. Other equipment include MXR bass DI, Aguilar tone hammer, Dunlop strings, and Mackie powered monitors. Brewer switched to Warwick bass guitars very recently and currently owns three Warwick bass guitars. As well as his ESP and Warwick gear, he owns bass guitars from a variety of other manufacturers. Brewer uses EMG pickups in the majority of his bass guitars and is an EMG endorsee.

=== Bass guitars ===
- Ernie Ball MusicMan Stingray HS 4 string bass
- ESP classic 4 string bass
- ESP custom shop Surveyor 5 string bass
- Black ESP 5 string bass
- Rick Toone "Sketch" 4 string bass
- Warwick Infinity 5 string
- Warwick Thumb NT 5 string
- Warwick Streamer Stage I 4-string

== Discography ==
With Reflux

- The Illusion of Democracy (2004)

With Animosity

- Animal (2007)

With The Faceless

- Autotheism (Sumerian Records, 2012)

With Chris Letchford

- Lightbox (2014) (4 tracks)

With Entheos

- Primal EP (2015)
- The Infinite Nothing (2016)
- Dark Future (2017)
- Time Will Take Us All (2023)

With Fallujah

- Empyrean (2022)
- Xenotaph (2025)

Solo

- Alone (Sumerian Records, 2011)
- Your Itinerary (Sumerian Records, 2013)

== Videography ==
Title	Year	Director	Artist	From the album
"Vertigo"	2012	-	Evan Brewer	Alone
"Deconsecrate"	2013	Ramon Boutviseth	The Faceless	Autotheism
