= Empyrean (album) =

Studio album by Fallujah
- Released: September 9, 2022
- Recorded: 2021–2022
- Studios: MRL Studios, Nashville, Tennessee
- Genres: Technical death metal, progressive death metal
- Length: 50:56
- Label: Nuclear Blast

Fallujah chronology
Undying Light (2019)	Empyrean (2022)	Xenotaph (2025)

Singles from Empyrean
- 1. "Radiant Ascension" Released: April 27, 2022; 2. "Embrace Oblivion" Released: July 7, 2022; 3. "Soulbreaker" Released: August 4, 2022

Professional ratings
Review scores
Source	Rating
Metal Injection	8/10
Metal Storm	8.4/10
Scream Magazine	6/6

Empyrean is the fifth studio album by American death metal band Fallujah, released on September 9, 2022. It is their first album to feature Kyle Schaefer as singer and Evan Brewer as bassist, replacing Antonio Palermo and Rob Morey, respectively. Palermo and Morey, along with guitarist Nico Santora who joined the band in 2020, were announced to have departed the band on the day the album's first single "Radiant Ascension" was released. It is also the last album to feature longtime drummer Andrew Baird. The band would later continue without him, relying on live drummers.

== Track listing ==
All song lyrics written by Kyle Schaefer and instrumentally composed by Scott Carstairs.

Empyrean track listing
No.	Title	Length
1.	"The Bitter Taste of Clarity"	4:51
2.	"Radiant Ascension"	4:03
3.	"Embrace Oblivion"	6:00
4.	"Into the Eventide"	6:03
5.	"Eden's Lament"	3:16
6.	"Soulbreaker"	4:12
7.	"Duality of Intent"	3:23
8.	"Mindless Omnipotent Master"	4:42
9.	"Celestial Resonance"	7:03
10.	"Artifacts"	7:23
Total length:		50:56

== Personnel ==
=== Fallujah ===
- Kyle Schaefer – vocals, programming
- Scott Carstairs – guitars
- Evan Brewer – bass
- Andrew Baird – drums

=== Production ===
- Peter Mohrbacher – cover art
- Mark Lewis – drums/vocal recording
