= Datalysium =

Studio album by The Zenith Passage
- Released: July 21, 2023
- Genre: Technical death metal
- Length: 45:42
- Label: Metal Blade Records
- Producer: Dave Otero

The Zenith Passage chronology
Solipsist (2016)	Datalysium (2023)

Singles from Solipsist
- 1. "Algorithmic Salvation" Released: August 9, 2021; 2. "Synaptic Depravation" Released: April 1, 2022; 3. "Lexicontagion" Released: May 15, 2022; 4. "Divinertia II" Released: June 14, 2023; 5. "Datalysium" Released: July 21, 2023

Professional ratings
Review scores
Source	Rating
Distorted	10/10
Metal Injection	8.5/10

Datalysium is the second studio album by the American technical death metal band The Zenith Passage. It was released via Metal Blade Records on July 21, 2023. It is the band's first release for Metal Blade, with whom they signed in December 2022. Commercially, it is the band's first album to chart; reaching No. 4 on the Billboard Top New Artists Albums Chart. The album is the band's first to feature vocalist Derek Rydquist, guitarist Christopher Beattie, and bassist Brandon Giffin.

== Background ==
In August 2021, two former members of The Faceless, Derek Rydquist and Brandon Giffin, joined the Zenith Passage, and the band released a new track titled "Algorithmic Salvation."

In December 2022, the band announced that they had signed with Metal Blade Records, and were in the process of writing two new releases, which would be produced by Dave Otero.

In April 2022, the band released the track "Synaptic Depravation" with an accompanying music video.

On May 15, 2023, the band announced the title of their upcoming LP, Datalysium and shared the album's album art and release date, July 21. The band also debuted the single "Lexicontagion," and released the album's track listing.

On June 14, 2023, the band released the single "Divinertia II" with an accompanying music video.

The title track along with an accompanying video were released on the day of the album's release, July 21.

The album was recorded partially at Justin McKinney's home studio, and partially at Derek Rydquist's apartment. Some of the album's vocals were tracked at Flatline Audio with Dave Otero who also handled mixing duties for the release. Ryan Williams provided production for some of the album's bass and vocals, and McKinney handled tracking duties.

== Track listing ==
All lyrics are written by Derek Rydquist; all music is composed by Justin McKinney, except where noted.

No.	Title	Music	Length
1.	"The Axiom of Error"		2:27
2.	"Algorithmic Salvation"		3:30
3.	"Lexicontagion"		3:41
4.	"Synaptic Depravation"		6:11
5.	"Deletion Cult"	Beattie; McKinney	5:13
6.	"Divinertia I"		5:15
7.	"Divinertia II"	Beattie; McKinney	5:23
8.	"Automated Twilight"		7:01
9.	"Datalysium"		7:01
Total length:			45:42

== Charts ==
U.S. Billboard Charts
Chart	Position
Top New Artists Albums	4
Current Hard Rock Albums	6
Independent Label Albums	12
Current Rock Albums	14
Current Albums	55

Canada Billboard Charts
Chart	Position
Hard Rock Albums	15
Current Digital Albums	17
Top Current Albums	28

== Personnel ==
The Zenith Passage

- Derek Rydquist – lead vocals
- Justin McKinney – guitars, vocals, synthesizers, keyboards, orchestrations, drum programming, recording, engineering
- Christopher Beattie – guitars
- Brandon Giffin – bass guitar

Additional personnel

- Dave Otero – engineering, mixing, production
- Ryan Williams – additional engineering
- Shindy Design – artwork
