= The Flesh Prevails =

Studio album by Fallujah
- Released: July 22, 2014
- Studio: Castle Ultimate Studios, Oakland, California
- Genre: Technical death metal, progressive death metal
- Length: 41:32
- Label: Unique Leader
- Producer: Zach Ohren

Fallujah chronology
Nomadic (2013)	The Flesh Prevails (2014)	Dreamless (2016)

The Flesh Prevails is the second studio album by American death metal band Fallujah, released on July 22, 2014. It was produced by Zack Ohren at Sharkbite Studios in Oakland, California. The artwork was made by Tomasz Alen Kopera. It was the first album to feature Brian James who replaced Rob Maramonte on rhythm guitar. The remastered album was released on July 5, 2024 to celebrate the album's tenth year anniversary.

Professional ratings
Review scores
Source	Rating
AllMusic	4/5 stars
Metal Hammer	8/10
Metal Storm	9.1/10
Metalsucks	5/5 stars
Sputnikmusic	4.5/5

== Track listing ==
All lyrics are written by Alex Hofmann.

No.	Title	Music	Length
1.	"Starlit Path"	Carstairs, Morey	5:27
2.	"Carved from Stone"	Carstairs, James, Hofmann	4:23
3.	"The Night Reveals"	Carstairs, James	4:17
4.	"The Flesh Prevails"	Carstairs, James	3:23
5.	"Levitation"	Carstairs, Morey	5:30
6.	"Alone with You"	Hofmann	3:02
7.	"Allure" (Instrumental)	Carstairs	4:08
8.	"Sapphire"	Carstairs	5:31
9.	"Chemical Cave"	Carstairs	5:55
Total length:			41:32

== Credits ==
Writing, performance and production credits are adapted from the album liner notes.

Fallujah

- Alex Hofmann – vocals, programming
- Scott Carstairs – guitar
- Brian James – guitar
- Robert Morey – bass
- Andrew Baird – drums

Guest musicians

- Roniit Alkayam – vocals on "The Flesh Prevails", "Levitation" and "Alone With You"
- Christian Münzner (Obscura) – guitar solo on "Allure"

Production

- Zach Ohren – mixing, mastering, engineer

Design and artwork

- Tomasz Alen Kopera – cover art
- Alex Hofmann (Cypher Visual) – layout, additional artwork

== Chart performance ==
Chart (2014)	Peak position
US Billboard 200	115
US Independent Albums (Billboard)	26
US Top Hard Rock Albums (Billboard)	15
US Heatseekers Albums (Billboard)	2
US Top Rock Albums (Billboard)	39
