= Undying Light =

Studio album by Fallujah
- Released: March 15, 2019
- Studio: OHMNI Studios, Nashville, Tennessee
- Genre: Progressive death metal
- Length: 44:54
- Label: Nuclear Blast
- Producer: Scott Carstairs, Mark Lewis, Fallujah

Fallujah chronology
Dreamless (2016)	Undying Light (2019)	Empyrean (2022)

Undying Light is the fourth studio album by American death metal band Fallujah, released on March 15, 2019. It was the only album to feature Antonio Palermo as singer, replacing Alex Hofmann after he left the band in 2017, as well as the last to feature bassist Rob Morey. It was produced by guitarist Scott Carstairs and Mark Lewis at OHMNI Studios in Nashville, Tennessee.

== Critical reception ==
Professional ratings
Review scores
Source	Rating
Angry Metal Guy	1/5 stars
Metal Hammer	4.5/7
Metal Injection	3.5/10
Metal Storm	5.8/10
Sputnikmusic	1.0/5

The album received mixed to negative reviews from critics for its departure from their earlier technical sound. Metal Storm gave the album a 5.8/10, saying "It's not a bad album, it's just entirely unremarkable, which is a crying shame for a band that managed to really distinguish themselves in what can be quite a repetitive sub-genre." Metal Injection gave the album a negative review, critiquing the album's production, the simplistic songwriting and song structure compared to past releases, and Palermo's vocal performance, writing "Undying Light isn’t a mixed bag or a slight misstep. It is a genuinely bad record that even diehard fans will have difficulty sitting through."

== Track listing ==
All lyrics are written by Antonio Palermo; all music is composed by Scott Carstairs.

Undying Light track listing
No.	Title	Length
1.	"Glass House"	4:04
2.	"Last Light"	4:34
3.	"Ultraviolet"	3:20
4.	"Dopamine"	5:27
5.	"The Ocean Above"	4:48
6.	"Hollow"	4:37
7.	"Sanctuary"	4:23
8.	"Eyes Like The Sun"	4:42
9.	"Distant And Cold"	4:03
10.	"Departure"	4:46
Total length:		44:54

== Personnel ==
=== Fallujah ===
- Antonio Palermo – vocals, programming
- Scott Carstairs – guitars
- Robert Morey – bass
- Andrew Baird – drums

=== Production ===
- Scott Carstairs – guitar, bass
- Mark Lewis – drums, vocals

=== Design and artwork ===
- Nick Keller – cover art
