= Dreamless =

Studio album by Fallujah
- Released: April 29, 2016
- Studio: Castle Ultimate Studios, Oakland, California; Audio Hammer Studios, Orlando, Florida
- Genre: Technical death metal, progressive death metal
- Length: 55:38
- Label: Nuclear Blast
- Producer: Zack Ohren, Mark Lewis, Fallujah

Fallujah chronology
The Flesh Prevails (2014)	Dreamless (2016)	Undying Light (2019)

Professional ratings
Review scores
Source	Rating
AllMusic	4/5 stars
Louder Sound	4/5 stars
Metal Injection	8.5/10
Metal Storm	9.2/10
MetalSucks	4/5 stars
Sputnikmusic	2.8/5

Dreamless is the third studio album by American death metal band Fallujah, released on April 29, 2016. It was the last album to feature Alex Hofmann on vocals and Brian James on guitar before both departed the band between 2017 and 2019, respectively. The album was produced by Zack Ohren at Sharkbite Studios in Oakland, California, and Mark Lewis of Audio Hammer Studios. The artwork was made by Peter Mohrbacher.

== Track listing ==
All songs written and composed by Alex Hofmann and Scott Carstairs.

No.	Title	Length
1.	"Face of Death"	3:30
2.	"Adrenaline"	4:21
3.	"The Void Alone"	4:18
4.	"Abandon"	4:31
5.	"Scar Queen"	4:04
6.	"Dreamless"	6:18
7.	"The Prodigal Son"	4:17
8.	"Amber Gaze"	4:32
9.	"Fidelio"	2:44
10.	"Wind for Wings"	6:14
11.	"Les Silences"	5:56
12.	"Lacuna"	4:53
Total length:		55:38

== Personnel ==
Writing, performance and production credits are adapted from the album liner notes.

=== Fallujah ===
- Alex Hofmann – vocals, programming
- Scott Carstairs – guitar
- Brian James – guitar
- Robert Morey – bass
- Andrew Baird – drums

=== Guest musicians ===
- Tori Letzler – vocals on "The Void Alone", "Dreamless" and "Wind for Wings"
- Katie Thompson – vocals on "Abandon", "Dreamless", and "Lacuna"
- Mike Semesky (Raunchy, ex-Intervals) – vocals on "Wind for Wings"
- Tymon Kruidenier (ex-Cynic) – guitar solo on "Dreamless"

=== Production ===
- Zack Ohren – engineer
- Mark Lewis – mixing, mastering, drum engineer

=== Design and artwork ===
- Peter Mohrbacher – cover art
- Alex Hofmann (Cypher Visual) – layout, additional artwork
