= Minuteman for the Moment =

Studio album by Look What I Did
- Released: October 4, 2005
- Recorded: July 2005
- Studio: Stagg Street Studios, Los Angeles
- Genre: Progressive rock; math rock; post-hardcore; metalcore
- Length: 52:02
- Label: Combat; Koch
- Producer: Brian Virtue

Look What I Did chronology
My First Time (2003)	Minuteman for the Moment (2005)	Atlas Drugged (2010)

Professional ratings
Review scores
Source	Rating
AllMusic	link
Decibel	(not rated) link
Punk News	1.5/5 stars

Minuteman for the Moment is the second studio album by Look What I Did, released on October 4, 2005 via Combat Records/Koch Records. It features an updated version of the song "Cupid Full of Eros" previously seen on the band's 2003 album My First Time, as well as the second song in the "Zanzibar" chapter also seen on the band's previous release.

== Track listing ==
All tracks are written by Look What I Did.

No.	Title	Length
1.	"Minuteman for the Moment"	3:07
2.	"Ultimate Complete Home Fitness Machine"	3:18
3.	"The Soiree"	5:13
4.	"The FOX Eats TV Ishmael"	4:39
5.	"Raining Pleasantries"	3:53
6.	"Appomattox Whorehouse"	3:35
7.	"Benevolesaurus Lex"	4:09
8.	"Chest Is a Ribcage"	4:27
9.	"Lightning Bugs"	4:21
10.	"Cupid Full of Eros"	3:06
11.	"Is, Was, and Will Be"	4:50
12.	"Zanzibar II: Sasha and Sebastian"	7:24

== Credits ==
Look What I Did

- Barry Donegan – vocals
- Colby Shea – guitars
- Aaron "Skeet" Childress – guitars
- Christopher Bradley – bass, vocal production
- Miles McPherson – drums

Additional

- Denise Weeks – additional vocals on track 12

Production

- Brian Virtue – producer, mixing, engineer
- Tom Baker – mastering
- Miles Wilson – assistant engineer
- Paul Romano – artwork
