= Look What I Did =

American band

- Origin: Nashville, Tennessee, U.S.
- Genres: Math rock; mathcore
- Years active: 2001–present
- Labels: Combat Records; Clockrock Recordings; Modernist Movement Recordings
- Members: Barry Donegan; Evan Brewer; Chris Bradley; Aaron Childress; Jake Omen
- Past members: Miles McPherson; Colby Shea; Ty Coughlin; Chad Omen

Look What I Did is an American band, formed in 2001 in Nashville, Tennessee. The band is known for its intense live show, described by Cincinnati CityBeat as a "live act capable of unleashing a scary, uncontrolled intensity bordering on dangerous", and oft-satirical eccentric lyrics.

== History ==
In 2003, the band added a second guitar player, Aaron "Skeet" Childress, formerly of National Green, and moved to Los Angeles. At this time it also released it first recording, an independently recorded, financed and released LP, My First Time, on its own Clockrock Recordings. Despite its limited pressing, the record was reported in ezines such as theprp.com, Loudside, and Opuszine.

In early 2008, the band signed a deal with the new label Modernist Movement. Atlas Drugged was released on February 9, 2010, by Modernist Movement Recordings. Atlas Drugged was produced by Brian Virtue. Decibel magazine referred to the band in a review of Atlas Drugged, "Look What I Did crush on political philosophers, put Latin words in their song titles and generally get off on being a bunch of wiseasses to spazzed-out Adderall punk."

Zanzibar III: Analog Prison was named the Best Metal Album of 2015 by The Nashville Scene.

The band released a full new song "If I Were You I Wouldn't" in January 2016 on its YouTube account, followed by "Fireball" in June 2016, the first songs released since Zanzibar III : Analog Prison.

The band was named after friend's child said the phrase, "Mommy, look what I did," to her mother about a drawing when Donegan was talking to her over the phone discussing what the band's name should be.

In September 2020, the band announced that Evan Brewer had joined on bass guitar, replacing Chad Omen, with new music underway in the studio.

== Discography ==
=== Studio albums ===
- 2003: My First Time (Clockrock Recordings)
- 2005: Minuteman for the Moment (Combat Records)
- 2010: Atlas Drugged (Modernist Movement Recordings)

=== Extended plays ===
- 2014: Zanzibar III: Analog Prison (So Say We All Records)
- 2019: Sympathy Porn (So Say We All Records)

== Videography ==
Year	Song	Album
2005	"Minuteman for the Moment"	Minuteman for the Moment
2010	"Fade to Daft"	Atlas Drugged
2010	I'm Majoring in Psychology"	Atlas Drugged
2010	"Serf Song"	Atlas Drugged
2011	"Pussy Comitatus"	Atlas Drugged
2012	"Zanzibar I: The Dry Mouth Horse That Died at the Watering Hole"	My First Time
2013	"Sebastian's Analog Prison"	Zanzibar II: Analog Prison
2015	"Wait, Don't Jump"	Zanzibar II: Analog Prison
2016	"If I Were You I Wouldn't"	Non-album single
2019	"Hands Off My Snacks"	Sympathy Porn
2023	"Jekyll Island Fiat Scratch"	Atlas Drugged
