= Empires (Animosity album) =

Studio album by Animosity
- Released: August 23, 2005
- Studio: Castle Ultimate Studios in Oakland, California
- Genre: Death metal, deathcore, deathgrind
- Length: 27:33
- Label: Black Market Activities, Metal Blade

Animosity chronology
| Shut It Down (2003) | Empires (2005) | Animal (2007) |

Professional ratings
Review scores
| Source | Rating |
|---|---|
| AllMusic | 4/5 stars |
| Blabbermouth.net | 7/10 stars |

Empires is the second studio album by American death metal band Animosity, released in 2005.

== Track listing ==
All lyrics are written by Leo Miller.

| No. | Title | Music | Length |
|---|---|---|---|
| 1. | "Thieves" | Frank Costa, Navene Koperweis | 4:33 |
| 2. | "Commoditism" | Costa, Koperweis | 2:09 |
| 3. | "Holy Shackles" | Costa, Koperweis | 2:58 |
| 4. | "Empires" | Costa, Koperweis | 2:54 |
| 5. | "The Black Page" | Costa, Koperweis | 3:11 |
| 6. | "Life Advocate" | Nick Lazaro | 2:55 |
| 7. | "Manhunt" | Costa, Koperweis | 2:19 |
| 8. | "Plutocracy" | Costa, Koperweis | 2:22 |
| 9. | "Shut It Down" | Costa, Koperweis | 4:11 |

== Personnel ==
Animosity

- Dan Kenny - Bass
- Frank Costa - Guitars
- Chase Fraser - Guitars
- Navene Koperweis - Drums
- Leo Miller - Vocals

Production

- Paul A. Romano - Art direction, Artwork, Design,
- Amy Trachtenberg - Photography (Band)
- Zack Ohren - Recording, Mixing, Mastering
