= Hoods (band) =

American beatdown hardcore band

- Origin: Sacramento, California, U.S.
- Genres: Beatdown hardcore; tough guy hardcore
- Years active: 1994–present
- Labels: Artery, Eulogy, Westcoast Worldwide, Victory Records, Breakout

Hoods is an American beatdown hardcore band from Sacramento, California. Formed in 1994 by Mike "Mikey Hood" Mraz who later added Logan Murray, Tony Goodloe and Billy Gaffney. Hoods shows influences such as Madball, Sick of It All, Minor Threat and Cro-Mags. They released their first EP entitled Once Again in 1996 and concentrated on live performances. After numerous fights between fans and an altercation between a couple of the band members and a police officer, the band left the Sacramento area. The band moved to the San Francisco Bay Area playing shows with groups such as Powerhouse, Redemption 87 and Skin Lab. In 1997 after a disagreement with bandmates and his mother's illness Gaffney left and was replaced by Jeremy. Murray and Goldoe then left and were replaced by Ben and Mario.

In 2005, Hoods were dropped from Victory Records after a dispute over royalties and management. They signed with Eulogy Recordings in 2005 and released The King Is Dead. The group released a new album, Ghetto Blaster, in April 2007. The release Pit Beast dropped in May 2009 after the band signed with I Scream Records. The cover art for this album was done by Craig Holloway, who created cover art for acts such as Negative Approach and Obituary among others. In 2014 the band signed with Artery Recordings and released "Gato Negro".

In summer 2026 their Birmingham, Bournemouth, Ipswich, and Manchester UK gigs were canceled. Promoters Surprise You're Dead Music stated "There will never be room for transphobia in our scene.", Bournemouth Anvil stating their concerns, and the Music Room Ipswich stating "We do not tolerate any kind of Racism, Sexism, Homophobia or Transphobia at the venue"

== Band members ==
=== Current ===
- Mikey Hood – vocals
- Jon (the jew) Korn – guitar
- Elijah Martinez – drums
- Andy Laughlin – bass

=== Original members ===
- Mikey Hood – guitar, vocals
- Tony Goodloe – vocals
- Logan Murray – bass
- Billy Gaffney – drums

=== Former ===
- Craig Spinelli – drums
- Rob McCarthy – drums
- Evan Krejci – guitar
- T-Gibbs – vocals
- Stephen Lauck – guitar
- Ben Garcia – vocals
- Jeremy Roberts – drums
- Mario – bass
- Marty – guitar
- Navene Koperweis – drums
- Whiteboy Ben – drums
- Nick Reinhart – guitar
- Nate Raider – bass
- Nick Lang "Lurch" – guitar
- Zack Peterson – guitar
- Mike Spaulding – vocals
- Eddy Lloreda – drums

== Discography ==
Year	Album	Label
1996	Once Again 1996 (EP)	Back ta Basics
1997	New Blood	Gain Ground
1998	Alone	Breakout Records
1999	Endless Pain	Stillborn Records
2001	Time...The Destroyer	Victory Records
2003	Pray for Death	Victory Records
2004	Seven Years in Sacramento	Self-released
2004	Live – The Legend Continues	720 Records
2005	Hoods/Freya (split)	Victory Records
2005	The King Is Dead	Eulogy Recordings
2007	Ghetto Blaster	Eulogy Recordings
2009	Pit Beast	I Scream Records
2014	Gato Negro	Artery Recordings
