= Fleshwrought =

American technical death metal band

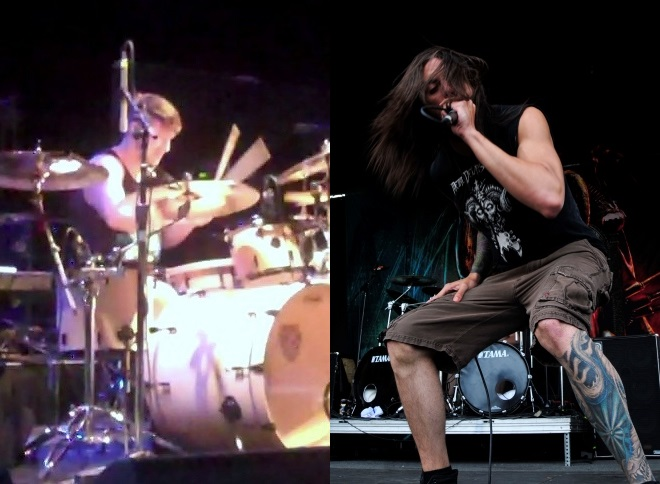
- Navene Koperweis and Jonny Davy

Background information
- Also known as: Fleshrot
- Origin: Santa Cruz, California, U.S.
- Genres: Technical death metal, progressive death metal, avant-garde metal
- Years active: 2003–2024
- Labels: Metal Blade Records
- Members: Navene Koperweis; Jonny Davy

Fleshwrought (formerly known as Fleshrot) is an American technical death metal band formed in 2003 by Navene Koperweis. They released their debut album, Dementia/Dyslexia in 2010, and in 2014 were in the process of recording their second album. The band is noted for its founder Navene Koperweis, a multi-instrumentalist who engineers, produces, and plays all the instruments for the band's recordings.

== History ==
Fleshwrought formed when Navene Koperweis teamed up with Nic Gauthier and made a demo at a friend's home. A live lineup followed, consisting of Koperweis, Gauthier, and Chase Fraser, with whom Koperweis had previously played in Animosity. The band played several shows in Santa Cruz, California, but later slowed down due to Animosity's high frequency tour schedule. Koperweis moved to San Francisco and continued writing material with his newly equipped gear, which included seven-string guitars, computers, and recording software.

Koperweis met Jonny Davy (of Job for a Cowboy) while on a tour with Animosity, and invited him to join the band. They started working on material that would become Dementia/Dyslexia. Because Koperweis was living in San Francisco while Davy was living in Phoenix, Arizona, they sent demos to each other via internet, before grouping out again in Koperweis' studio to finish the recording. Dementia/Dyslexia was released in 2010 and received mostly positive reviews.

== Influences ==
The band is influenced by a wide range of musical genres, including electronic, progressive rock, and experimental music. Some of the bands and artists that influenced Fleshwrought include Necrophagist, Decrepit Birth, Origin, Mats/Morgan Band, Special Defects, Frank Zappa, Squarepusher, Corneilius, and Siriusmo.

"In turn, my influences always seem to shine through and manifest in my music because the one rule I have followed would be that there are no rules."

— Navene Koperweis

== Members ==
- Navene Koperweis – guitars, drums, bass
- Jonny Davy – vocals

== Discography ==
- Dementia/Dyslexia, 2010
