= Autotheism (album) =

Studio album by The Faceless
- Released: August 14, 2012
- Recorded: 2012, Keene Machine Studios, North Hollywood, California
- Genre: Progressive death metal, technical death metal
- Length: 40:56
- Label: Sumerian
- Producer: Michael Keene

The Faceless chronology
Planetary Duality (2008)	Autotheism (2012)	In Becoming a Ghost (2017)

Professional ratings
Aggregate scores
Source	Rating
Metacritic	(77/100)
Review scores
Source	Rating
About.com	4.5/5 stars
Allmusic	3.5/5 stars
Alternative Press	4/5 stars
Kerrang!	4/5 stars
Kerrang!	8.7/10
Revolver Magazine	4/5 stars

Autotheism is the third studio album by American technical death metal band The Faceless. It was released on August 14, 2012, through Sumerian Records. The album debuted at number 50 on the Billboard 200, number 3 on the Top Hard Rock Albums, number 13 on the Top Independent albums, number 18 on Top Rock albums, and hit number 1 on the CMJ radio loud rock chart. This is the band's only album to feature vocalist Geoffrey Ficco, rhythm guitarist Wes Hauch, and bassist Evan Brewer.

== Recording and production ==
The record was recorded at Keene's home studio in Los Angeles in 2012. Preproduction versions of almost every song had been previously recorded by Keene throughout 2011, along with an additional song which ultimately was not used for the record. Keene noted that this track was better suited for his solo project and that the song would eventually see the light of day under that project name. Some of the guitar tracking for the preproduction captured a natural, raw quality and ended up being used in the final album versions of the songs. Keene approached the recording of Autotheism differently than previous records. All guitar and bass was recorded direct and drums were tracked live right in Keene's living room. Keene states that 7 different guitars were used to achieve the broad array of tones heard, including his neon green Washburn WM526, a 1959 Gibson Les Paul, a Bernie Rico Jr, as well as a chambered guitar made of carbon fiber.

Evan Brewer debuted the use of fretless bass in The Faceless on two tracks on a whim of experimentation in the studio. Keene also explored a more industrial influence, creating "post-apocalyptic" percussion sequences on many of the tracks. This played a big part in giving the record its distinctly dark quality. Another key quality of Autotheism came from Keene's time spent on experimenting with string arrangements and keyboard sequencing.

The lyrics were written largely in the studio, a process that Keene and Ficco described as "grueling, but rewarding". An outline for the story of the lyrics was written, followed by the individual topics for each song. Then, Keene and Ficco worked out the lyrics and phrasing as they went along with the recording process. "The bulk of the time was spent on the writing of the lyrics and phrasing. Once that part was complete, the actual recording flew by. "Geoff is an exceptionally easy vocalist to record and produce" said Keene. Michael Keene cited Ray Kurzweil as a lyrical inspiration on the album.

Vocally, the album has a much greater emphasis on Michael Keene's clean vocals than previous albums. This is shown on the album's first track, which is sung primarily by Keene.

A guest appearance by Keene's long time friend and infamous YouTube sensation Sergio "The Sexy Sax Man" Flores appears on the track "Deconsecrate". Keene's mother also contributes harmonizing background vocals on the track "Emancipate".

== Theme ==
Keene has stated in interviews that the name "Autotheism" derives from "auto" meaning self and "theism" meaning belief in God or gods, hence autotheism means "believing in one's self", or "being your own God". The album questions antiquated belief systems that are in play in current society. As well as touching upon religion, the album touches upon growth in technology at an exponential rate, the Holographic Universe theory, and science as a new religion, or alternatively, knowledge and reason as a reigning religion. Keene said in interviews that the inspiration for the album came partly from reading a book by Ray Kurzweil called The Singularity Is Near. The album also has an underlying theme of "Age of Reason" or "Renaissance"-esque discovery and ethics traits; alternatively, "starting over" or massively rethinking the way current systems are run. The album artwork, as well as the music and lyrics, intuitively portray this atmosphere.

== Track listing ==
Music written by Michael Keene, except where noted.

No.	Title	Length
1.	"Autotheist": I. "Movement I: Create"; II. "Movement II: Emancipate"; III. "Movement III: Deconsecrate"	17:43: 3:44; 7:20; 6:39
2.	"Accelerated Evolution" (Keene, Steve Jones)	4:39
3.	"The Eidolon Reality"	3:46
4.	"Ten Billion Years" (Wes Hauch, Keene)	5:34
5.	"Hail Science"	0:53
6.	"Hymn of Sanity"	1:34
7.	"In Solitude"	6:27
Total length:		40:56

== Personnel ==
=== The Faceless ===
- Geoff Ficco – lead vocals
- Michael Keene – lead guitar, clean vocals, keyboards
- Wes Hauch – rhythm guitar, lead guitar on "Ten Billion Years"
- Evan Brewer – bass guitar
- Lyle Cooper – drums

=== Guest appearances ===
- Sergio Flores – saxophone on "Deconsecrate”
- Tara Keene – backing vocals on "Emancipate”

=== Production ===
- Michael Keene – production, recording, mixing, mastering

=== Other ===
- Marcelo Vasco – artwork
- Steve Jones – additional composition on "Accelerated Evolution"
