= The Infinite Nothing =

Studio album by Entheos
- Released: April 1, 2016
- Genres: Technical death metal, progressive metal
- Length: 39:00
- Label: Artery Recordings

Entheos chronology
Primal (2015)	The Infinite Nothing (2016)	Dark Future (2017)

Professional ratings
Review scores
Source	Rating
Heavy Blog Is Heavy	4.5/5 stars
New Noise Magazine	4.5/5 stars

The Infinite Nothing is the first studio album by the American progressive metal supergroup Entheos. It was released by Artery Recordings on April 1, 2016.

A music video for the song "New Light" was released on May 16, 2016.

== Background and recording ==
A lyric video for the song "Neural Damage" was released on February 26, 2016.

A lyric video for the title track, "The Infinite Nothing", was premiered via Loudwire on March 11, 2016.

The album finished 5th in a Loudwire reader poll for the most anticipated release of 2016.

Speaking in an interview with Metal Insider on March 15, 2016, Evan Brewer credited Navene Koperweis with the electronic atmospheres on the album, and credited Dying Fetus, Meshuggah and Necrophagist as influences on the band's sound. When asked whether the recording process differed from that of their first EP, Brewer said, "It was pretty similar, just more of everything. Everything that was heard on the EP was elaborated on the album almost like the EP serves as a beginner course. There was a member change about three quarters through the album. The guitar player that was on the EP [Frank Costa], did all the rhythm tracking on the album, but he left before we did the leads so that was done by our new guy, Malcolm [Pugh]. So, there are two different guys contributing on the guitar side of the album."

== Track listing ==
No.	Title	Length
1.	"Perpetual Miscalculations"	5:19
2.	"New Light"	5:12
3.	"The Infinite Nothing"	4:49
4.	"Terminal Stages of Nostalgia"	4:09
5.	"An Ever-Expanding Human"	5:50
6.	"Bad Chemicals"	4:34
7.	"Mind Alone"	5:00
8.	"Neural Damage"	4:03
Total length:		39:00

== Personnel ==
Entheos

- Chaney Crabb – vocals
- Malcolm Pugh – lead guitar
- Frank Costa – rhythm guitar
- Evan Brewer – bass
- Navene Koperweis – drums
