= Xenotaph =

Studio album by Fallujah
- Released: June 13, 2025
- Studio: Flatline Audio, Denver, Colorado; Top Track Studios, Nashville, Tennessee
- Genre: Progressive metal, technical death metal
- Length: 42:19
- Label: Nuclear Blast
- Producer: Fallujah

Fallujah chronology
Empyrean (2022)	Xenotaph (2025)

Singles from Xenotaph
- 1. "Kaleidoscopic Waves" Released: March 5, 2025; 2. "Labyrinth of Stone" Released: April 16, 2025; 3. "Step Through the Portal and Breathe" Released: May 14, 2025

Xenotaph is the sixth studio album by American death metal band Fallujah. It was released on June 13, 2025, via Nuclear Blast Records, in vinyl, CD and digital formats. It features the singles, "Kaleidoscopic Waves", "Labyrinth of Stone" and "Step Through the Portal and Breathe".

== Background ==
Kyle Schaefer, the lead vocalist of Fallujah, described the album as their "most technical, dynamic and progressive material to date", calling it the band's most "collaborative" and "ambitious" album. It was mixed, mastered and engineered by Dave Otero, and produced by the band.

Preceded by Empyrean, the band's 2022 project, Xenotaph consists of eight tracks, ranging between three and seven minutes each, with a total runtime of approximately forty-two minutes. Incorporating progressive rock and jazz fusion, it was noted as encompassing technical death metal.

The cover art for the album was created by Peter Mohrbacher.

The band released the first single of Xenotaph on March 5, 2025, titled "Kaleidoscopic Waves". "Labyrinth of Stone" was released as the second single on April 16, 2025, alongside a music video directed by Sam Mooradian. It was followed by "Step Through the Portal and Breathe" as the album's third single on May 14, 2025, with a music video.

== Reception ==
Professional ratings
Review scores
Source	Rating
Blabbermouth	8.5/10 stars
Metal Hammer	8/10 stars
MetalSucks	4.5/5 stars

Gareth Allen of Louder Than War remarked, "This is quite simply a must listen metal album that redefines the creative possibilities within technical death metal." Blabbermouth rated the album eight and a half out of ten, stating "There is no denying that Fallujah are clever bastards, but soul and emotion are bubbling away, close to the surface and fundamental to the band's refined artistry. Put more simply, Xenotaph is a transcendental tour-de-force."

MetalSucks gave it a score of four and a half out of five and described it as "a tremendous accomplishment that further validates Fallujah as a dominant force in the realm of progressive/technical death metal." It was given a rating of eight out of ten by Tom O'Boyle of Metal Hammer, who noted, "With Xenotaph clocking it at only 44 minutes, Fallujah retains a degree of accessibility to their glitzy technicality."

== Track listing ==
Xenotaph track listing
No.	Title	Length
1.	"In Stars We Drown"	3:06
2.	"Kaleidoscopic Waves"	4:12
3.	"Labyrinth of Stone"	5:45
4.	"The Crystalline Veil"	5:46
5.	"Step Through the Portal and Breathe"	6:40
6.	"A Parasitic Dream"	3:33
7.	"The Obsidian Architect"	5:47
8.	"Xenotaph"	7:30
Total length:		42:19

== Personnel ==
Credits for Xenotaph adapted from Blabbermouth.

=== Fallujah ===
- Kyle Schaefer – vocals, programming
- Scott Carstairs – lead guitar
- Sam Mooradian – rhythm guitar
- Evan Brewer – bass
- Kevin Alexander – drums

=== Additional contributors ===
- Fallujah – production
- Dave Otero – engineering, mixing, mastering
- Mike Low – engineering
- Peter Mohrbacher – cover art

== Charts ==
Chart performance for Xenotaph
Chart (2025)	Peak position
French Rock & Metal Albums (SNEP)	54
