= Barry Donegan =

M. Barry Donegan
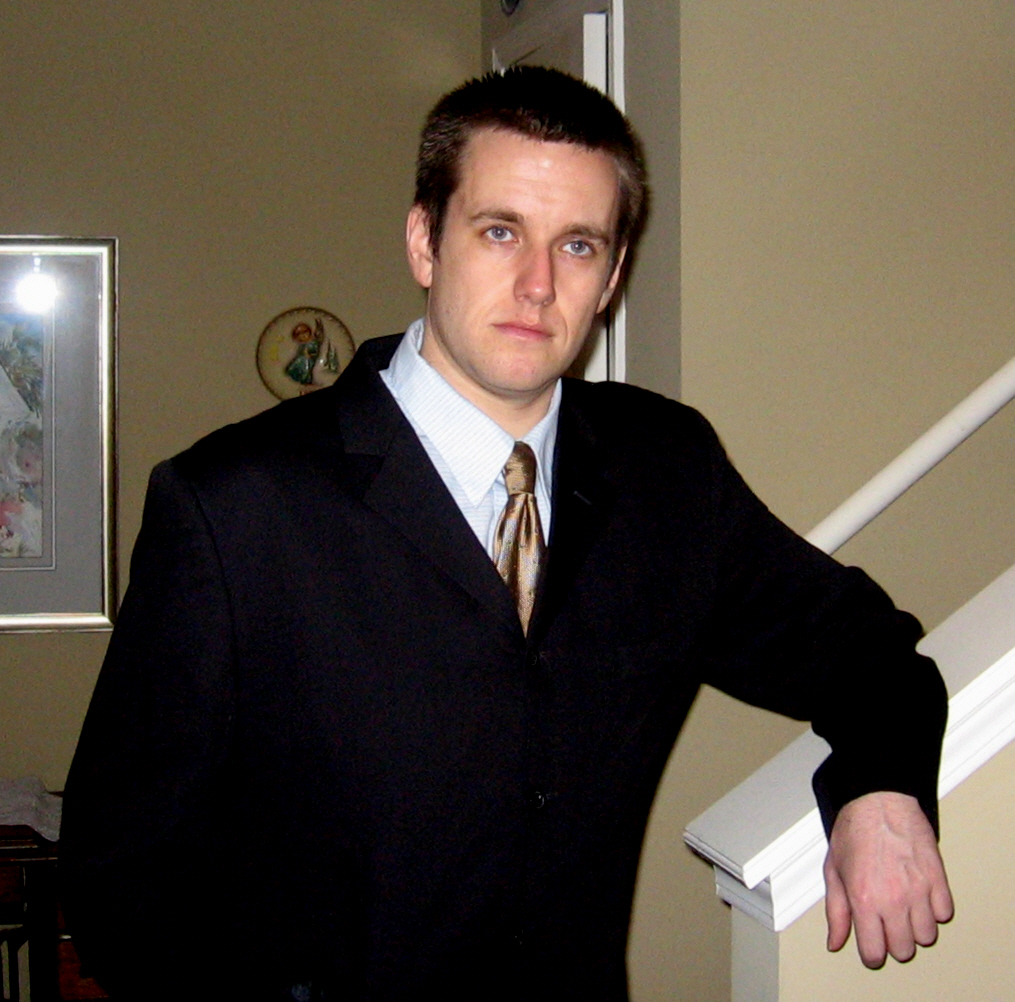
- vocalist for Look What I Did and candidate for City Council at Large in Metro/Nashville Davidson County in 2015

Background information
- Born: Michael Barry Donegan; November 16, 1978 (age 47)
- Genres: Experimental music Punk; Alternative metal Avant-garde metal Vocal music Metal; Noise music
- Occupation: Musician.Politician
- Instruments: vocals, guitars,
- Years active: 1999 - present
- Labels: Combat, Koch
- Website: Look What I Did(band), Donegan for City Council at Large, Barry Donegan Artist Page

Michael Barry Donegan (born November 16, 1978) is an American singer, songwriter, writer, political activist, and political candidate best known as the lead singer of the rock band Look What I Did. He is also working on a side project with Evan Brewer of Animosity which is in the writing stage according to MTV Metal File. He is a candidate for City Council at Large in Nashville, Tennessee, for 2015, although the local Nashville elections are technically non-partisan. Donegan was elected and served as director at large of the Davidson County Republican Party from 2009 to 2011 and currently writes political columns for the website of the national chapter of the Republican Liberty Caucus. In 2008, he wrote an election-year political column called "Dangerous Truth" for the heavy metal music e-zine thegauntlet.com and was at one time a featured writer for the libertarian-themed online magazine, thefreedomrevolution.com.

== Biography ==
As a vocalist, Donegan is known for a singing style which does "alternate between melodic singing and hardcore screaming" and lyrics which are stream of consciousness, as characterized by a review of the album Minuteman for the Moment at Allmusic.

During 2005–2006, Donegan's group Look What I Did completed seven full United States tours, alongside groups such as Drop Dead, Gorgeous, The Human Abstract, Animosity, Contra, Ion Dissonance, Folly, Dog Fashion Disco, Tub Ring and including a stint on the Warped Tour. An article in Decibel magazine characterized his status of residence at the time as effectively "homeless", as their tour schedule at the time was so intense.

Donegan wrote and performed on the record albums My First Time, which was released under Clockrock Recordings and Minuteman for the Moment which was released on Combat Records and Koch Records. It was produced by Brian Virtue, who has previously worked with bands such as Deftones and Jane's Addiction. Decibel magazine referred to Donegan's voice as "soaring and precise" on Minuteman for the Moment.

In a 2010 interview with AOL's Noisecreep, Donegan hinted about a "secret conspiracy I am involved in with people who have a lot of money to overthrow the music industry." In a later interview from the Decibel Magazine blog, he revealed that this conspiracy was a new online music service called Gazzmic, of which he is a founding member. In the interview, Donegan stated, "Gazzmic began as a way to stage a technological revolution against the failed aspects of the modern music industry. The goal is to help bands and fans capitalize on the ease of delivering content in the Information Age. A wide range of new technological tools and a content management system are on the way; the first order of business is a free custom mobile app platform for bands for the iPhone and Android Market. The endgame for Gazzmic, which I can't speak in detail on just yet, involves easier access to music for fans and a more profitable means of content delivery for bands. We are just now entering the closed beta phase, so the excitement will be unfolding in the near future."

2010 also saw the release of an album called Atlas Drugged by Donegan's band Look What I Did. The album was released on Modernist Movement Recordings and produced by Brian Virtue (Jane's Addiction, Horse the Band, Chevelle). In 2011, the band started work on a new rock opera entitled Zanzibar III: Analog Prison., which was released in 2014.

== Political positions ==
Donegan's political positions can best be characterized as libertarian, believing protection of social and economic liberties as being the chief and only legitimate power of government. He favors a non-interventionist foreign policy, and supported Ron Paul in the 2008 Republican Party primaries. He has also suggested retooling health and safety codes to prevent them from shutting down struggling small businesses. He opposes the person-hood of the corporation, the income tax, and the Federal Reserve. He supports ending the war on drugs.
