= Your Itinerary =

Studio album by Evan Brewer
- Released: July 16, 2013
- Recorded: 2012–2013
- Genre: Progressive metal
- Length: 35:36
- Label: Sumerian
- Producer: Navene Koperweis, Evan Brewer

Evan Brewer chronology
Alone (2011)	Your Itinerary (2013)

Your Itinerary is the second album by American bassist Evan Brewer. This is the first album by Evan Brewer to feature other instruments other than the bass guitar and the first album to feature other musicians than Evan Brewer. Sumerian Records uploaded a trailer for Your Itinerary via their YouTube Channel. Microscopic Scale was also released on June 19, 2013.

== Track listing ==
All tracks are written by Evan Brewer

No.	Title	Length
1.	"The Adjacent Possible"	3:54
2.	"Microscopic Scale"	3:30
3.	"Another World"	4:21
4.	"This Seems Familiar"	6:06
5.	"A Little Goes a Long Way"	2:31
6.	"Cause for Concern"	5:11
7.	"Home Away from Home"	3:20
8.	"Full Circle"	6:47
Total length:		35:36

== Personnel ==
Credits for the album are taken from Allmusic:

- Evan Brewer - bass guitar, art direction, engineering, production
- Navene Koperweis - drums, synths, mastering, mixing, production
- Jeremiah Abel - piano, keyboards

Guest appearances

- Robert Provine – guitar solo on “Another World”
- Paul Allen – guitar solo on “Home Away From Home”
