= In Becoming a Ghost =

Studio album by the Faceless
- Released: December 1, 2017
- Genres: Technical death metal; progressive black metal
- Length: 42:42
- Label: Sumerian Records
- Producer: Michael Keene

The Faceless chronology
Autotheism (2012)	In Becoming a Ghost (2017)

Singles from In Becoming a Ghost
- 1. "The Spiraling Void" Released: September 28, 2015; 2. "Black Star" Released: June 9, 2017; 3. "Digging the Grave" Released: October 30, 2017

In Becoming a Ghost is the fourth studio album by the Faceless. It was released on December 1, 2017 through Sumerian Records. It is the only album with Abigail Williams' Ken Sorceron on vocals, The Zenith Passage's Justin McKinney on guitar and Chason Westmoreland, formerly of Hate Eternal, session drumming. The album debuted at #66 on the Billboard Top Current Albums chart.

Michael Keene tracked the bass on the entire album by himself. This is also the first the Faceless LP to feature songs recorded with Drop A tuning using seven string guitars as well as E standard tuning on 6 string guitars. It is their first full-length release in five years, the last being 2012's Autotheism.

== Background, recording, and promotion ==
In a July 2016 interview with Metal Injection, guitarist Justin McKinney stated that In Becoming a Ghost (which at the time was still officially unnamed) was "pretty much done". McKinney had joined in February of the same year. In April 2017, in an interview with The PRP, Keene speculated at an August release date.

Only one single, "Digging the Grave" was released in promotion of the album's December release date.

The first single from the album, "The Spiraling Void", from September 2015, as well as the second single, "Black Star", released over two years later in June 2017, were put out before an official release date was set for the album.

"The Spiraling Void" featured Derek Rydquist on vocals. Rydquist was no longer in a position to tour, nor be in the band, but he recorded the track with both parties knowing he wouldn’t be touring with the group. Keene has said that “Derek will always have a place in The Faceless. Be it just recording or occasional appearances”. Rydquist appeared on several other songs on the record as well including, "Shake The Disease" and "I Am"

This was also the first record to include a cover song. A unique take on the song “Shake the Disease” by Depeche Mode was part of the track listing. This would prove to be by far the most experimental record by the Faceless to date.

== Release & reception ==
Professional ratings
Review scores
Source	Rating
MetalInjection	9.5/10
ItDjents	7.5/10

Metal Injection reviewer Michael Pementel gave the album 9.5/10, calling it a "magnificent work of sinister mysteries and pure artistry."

== Track listing ==
All tracks are written by Michael Keene, except where noted.

No.	Title	Music	Length
1.	"In Becoming a Ghost"		1:00
2.	"Digging the Grave"	Keene, McKinney	5:12
3.	"Black Star"	Keene, McKinney	5:38
4.	"Cup of Mephistopheles"	Keene, McKinney	5:29
5.	"The Spiraling Void"	Keene, McKinney, Rydquist	5:27
6.	"Shake the Disease" (Depeche Mode cover)	Martin Gore	5:42
7.	"I Am"	Keene, McKinney	5:56
8.	"Ghost Reprise"		1:00
9.	"(Instru)mental Illness"		2:20
10.	"The Terminal Breath"		4:58
Total length:			42:42

== Personnel ==
The Faceless

- Michael "Machine" Keene – guitars, clean vocals, bass, keyboards, vocoder, orchestration, programming, engineering, mixing, mastering, production
- Justin McKinney – guitar solos (track 2, 3), orchestration contribution (2, 4, 5)
- Chason Westmoreland – drums
- Ken Sorceron – lead vocals

Additional personnel

- Sergio Flores – flute solo (2)
- Derek "Demon Carcass" Rydquist – lead vocals (5), additional vocals (6, 7)

== Charts ==
Chart (2017)	Peak position
US Top Hard Rock Albums (Billboard)	16
US Independent Albums (Billboard)	8
