= Shut It Down (album) =

Studio album by Animosity
- Released: June 17, 2003
- Genre: Deathcore, grindcore, metalcore
- Length: 22:28
- Label: Tribunal

Animosity chronology
Shut It Down (2003)	Empires (2005)

Professional ratings
Review scores
Source	Rating
Allmusic	3.5/5 stars

Shut It Down is the first studio album by the American metal band Animosity released in 2003.

In 2024, Metal Injection included the album in their list of "10 Deathcore Albums That Aged Incredibly Well".

== Track listing ==
No.	Title	Length
1.	"Intro"	0:45
2.	"Grey Skies"	2:54
3.	"Instilling the Affliction"	2:04
4.	"Saved"	1:30
5.	"24 More"	2:24
6.	"Leashes"	2:30
7.	"Fake Blood"	2:11
8.	"Anti-Kingdom"	2:40
9.	"Terminal Existence"	2:30
10.	"Life Advocate"	3:00

Deluxe Digital Edition
No.	Title	Length
11.	"Manhunt" (demo)	02:21
12.	"Holy Shackles" (demo)	02:55

== Personnel ==
Animosity

- Leo Miller – vocals
- Frank Costa – guitar
- Sean Kopperweis – guitar
- Nick Lazaro – bass
- Navene Kopperweis – drums

Production

- Zach Ohren – recording, engineering
- Matthew Rudzinski – production
- Jacob Bigham – artwork & design
