= Akeldama (album) =

Studio album by The Faceless
- Released: November 14, 2006
- Recorded: 2006
- Genre: Technical death metal, deathcore
- Length: 33:18
- Label: Sumerian
- Producer: Michael Keene

The Faceless chronology
Akeldama (2006)	Planetary Duality (2008)

Professional ratings
Review scores
Source	Rating
Metal Injection	8/10 stars
Sputnik Music	4/5 stars

Akeldama is the debut studio album by technical death metal band The Faceless. It was released on November 14, 2006, as the first release from Sumerian Records. The title of the album is Aramaic for "Field of Blood". It was produced by Michael Keene.

== Sound and genre ==
Akeldama is the only album by The Faceless to incorporate a deathcore sound and style. Breakdowns and metalcore riffs are frequent on the release. The band abandoned their deathcore sound after this album.

== Track listing ==
All tracks are written by The Faceless

No.	Title	Length
1.	"An Autopsy"	3:11
2.	"Pestilence" (feat. Tara Keene)	3:54
3.	"All Dark Graves"	3:50
4.	"Horizons of Chaos I: Oracle of the Onslaught"	3:38
5.	"Horizons of Chaos II: Hypocrisy"	3:43
6.	"Leica"	5:12
7.	"Akeldama"	5:51
8.	"The Ghost of a Stranger"	3:55
Total length:		33:18

== Personnel ==
The Faceless

- Derek Rydquist — lead vocals
- Michael Keene — lead guitar, clean vocals, spoken word, vocoder speech
- Steve Jones — rhythm guitar
- Brandon Giffin — bass guitar
- Michael Sherer — keyboards
- Brett Batdorf — drums (tracks 1, 3, 6, 8)
- Andy Taylor — drums (tracks 2, 5)
- Navene Koperweis — drums (track 4)
- Nick Pierce — drums (track 7)

Artwork and design

- Album artwork & layout by Nick Steinhardt (23 in. graphics)

Production and recording

- Engineered, Produced, Mixed & mastered by Michael Keene @ Keene Machine Studios, Tarzana, CA
- Management by Joe Sarrach (Astrum Entertainment)
- Booking by Ash Avildsen (EE Booking)
