= Planetary Duality =

Studio album by The Faceless
- Released: November 11, 2008
- Recorded: 2008
- Genre: Technical death metal, progressive metal
- Length: 31:42
- Label: Sumerian
- Producer: Michael Keene

The Faceless chronology
Akeldama (2006)	Planetary Duality (2008)	Autotheism (2012)

Professional ratings
Review scores
Source	Rating
Der Metal Krieger	(9/10)
Ultimate Guitar	9.5/10 stars
MetalSucks	4.5/5 stars
Blabbermouth	(8.5/10)

Planetary Duality is the second studio album by American death metal band The Faceless. It was released on November 11, 2008 through Sumerian Records (in Europe through Lifeforce Records). It is a concept album with the lyrics following a science fiction theme of an extraterrestrial and extra-dimensional race controlling the world and is loosely inspired by the book The Children of the Matrix by David Icke. The album debuted at number 119 on the Billboard 200, selling around 5,600 copies in its first week.

== Track listing ==
No.	Title	Length
1.	"Prison Born"	1:59
2.	"Ancient Covenant"	4:02
3.	"Shape Shifters"	0:44
4.	"Coldly Calculated Design"	3:41
5.	"XenoChrist"	5:01
6.	"Sons of Belial"	4:46
7.	"Legion of the Serpent"	4:27
8.	"Planetary Duality": I. "Hideous Revelation"; II. "A Prophecies Fruition"	7:02 1:34 5:28
Total length:		31:42

== Personnel ==
The Faceless

- Derek Rydquist - lead vocals
- Michael Keene - guitars, clean vocals, vocoder, keyboards
- Steve Jones - guitars
- Brandon Giffin - bass
- Lyle Cooper - drums

Artwork and design

- Artwork - Pär Olofsson
- Layout - Kilebong.com

Other

- Matthew Blackmar - keyboards

== Appearances ==
The fifth song "XenoChrist" is featured in Rock Band 3 as downloadable content via the Rock Band Network.
