= Animal (Animosity album) =

Studio album by Animosity
- Released: October 2, 2007
- Genre: Deathcore, deathgrind
- Length: 27:33
- Label: Black Market Activities, Metal Blade
- Producer: Kurt Ballou

Animosity chronology
Empires (2005)	Animal (2007)

Professional ratings
Review scores
Source	Rating
AllMusic	3.5/5 stars
Lambgoat	9/10

Animal is the third and last studio album by American death metal band Animosity, released in 2007.

== Track listing ==
1. "Terrorstorm" - 3:53
2. "Tooth Grinder" - 2:54
3. "Bombs Over Rome" - 2:34
4. "Evangelicult" - 0:04
5. "Animal" - 2:44
6. "Plunder Incorporated" - 2:40
7. "Operating From The Ditch" - 2:47
8. "You Can't Win" - 3:47
9. "Progression in Defeat" - 2:37
10. "Elucidation" - 0:34
11. "A Passionate Journey" - 4:09
