= Fallujah (band) =

American death metal band

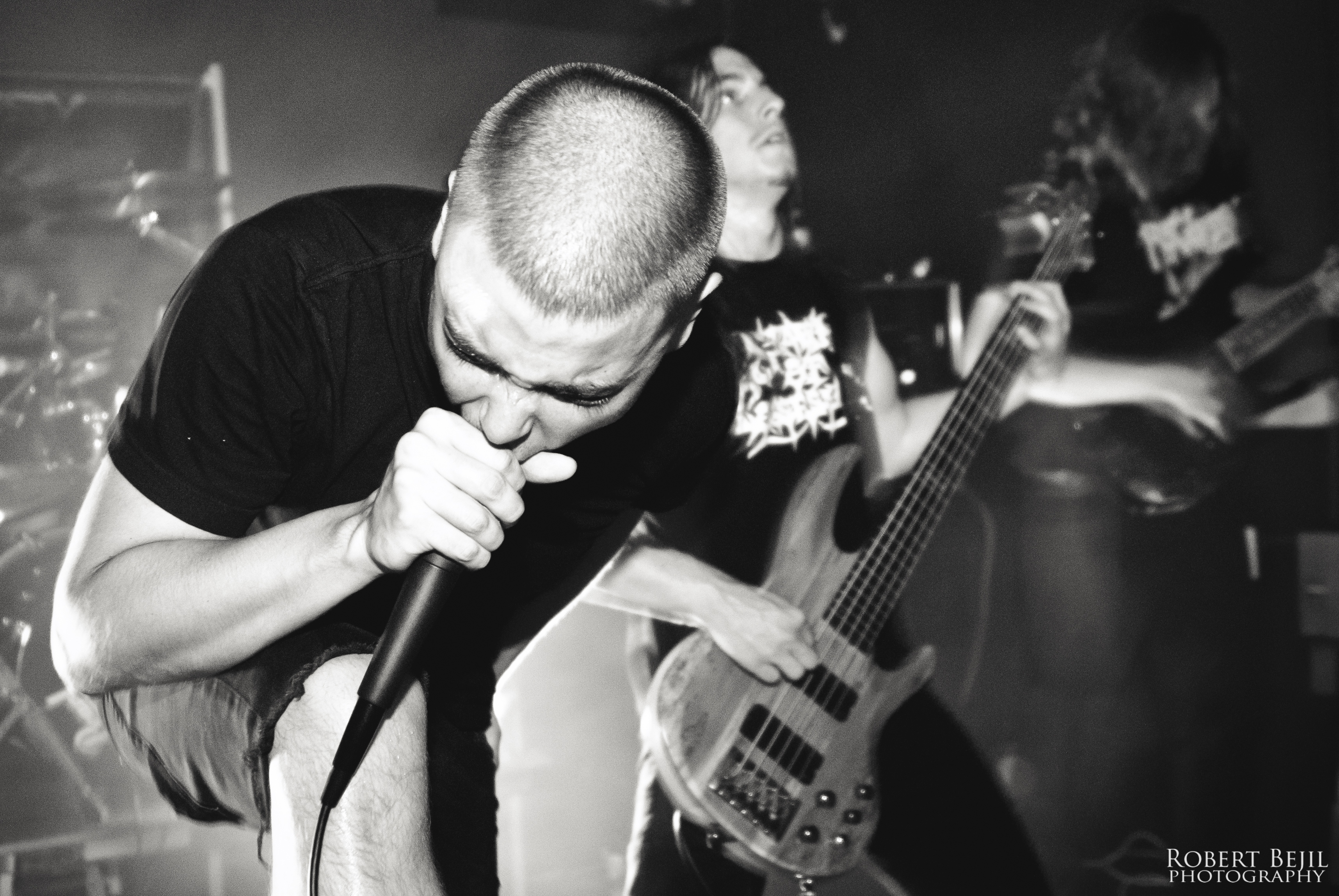
- Fallujah in 2011

Background information
- Origin: San Francisco, California, United States
- Genres: Technical death metal, progressive death metal, deathcore (early)
- Years active: 2007–present
- Labels: Unique Leader, Nuclear Blast, Grindhouse
- Members: Scott Carstairs; Kyle Schaefer; Evan Brewer; Sam Mooradian; Andrew Ramirez
- Past members: Dan Wissinger; John Cheatham; Brandon Hoberg; Rob Maramonte; Anthony Borges; Suliman Arghandiwal; Tommy Logan; Alex Hofmann; Brian James; Rob Morey; Antonio Palermo; Nico Santora; Andrew Baird; Kevin Alexander

Fallujah is an American technical death metal band from San Francisco, California, formed in 2007. Fallujah has toured with acts such as The Black Dahlia Murder, Carnifex, Thy Art Is Murder, Dying Fetus, Between the Buried and Me, and The Contortionist.

== History ==
=== Formation (2007–2010) ===
Fallujah was founded in early 2007 by high school friends Alex Hofmann, Scott Carstairs, Tommy Logan, Dan Wissinger, and Suliman Arghandiwal. The band name comes from the Iraqi city of Fallujah, located in the Al Anbar province. Prior to signing to its first record label, the band went through their first lineup changes with the departure of bassist Dan Wissinger and drummer Tommy Logan, who would be later replaced by Brandon Hoberg and Andrew Baird in 2007, respectively. In 2008 vocalist Suliman Arghandiwal also quit the band. Replacing Arghandiwal, guitarist Alex Hofmann took up vocals, with Rob Maramonte joining the band as the new guitarist (Maramonte would later quit the band and was replaced by guitarist Anthony Borges in 2009. However, he returned to the band in 2010). Hoberg would be later replaced by bassist Rob Morey. In 2009, the band released their first demo release, immediately followed by their first EP titled Leper Colony released on January 17. On February 5, 2010, the band played their first professional concert in Sacramento, California.

=== The Harvest Wombs (2011–2013) ===
On November 17, 2011, the band went on to release their first full-length album The Harvest Wombs, with producer Sam Pura, under California-based label Unique Leader Records. On April 2, 2013, the band independently released their second EP titled Nomadic, incorporating ambient sequences, clean guitars, and female vocals by former Whirr singer Byanca Munoz.

=== The Flesh Prevails (2014–2015) ===
On July 22, 2014, Fallujah released their second album titled The Flesh Prevails on Unique Leader Records. The album was released while the band participated in the 2014 Summer Slaughter tour alongside Morbid Angel, the Faceless, Dying Fetus, and Thy Art is Murder. The album received significant acclaim, despite some critics saying the production was a victim of the "loudness wars" and had little dynamic range.

On January 15, 2015, Nuclear Blast announced the band's official signing to the label, stating, "Fallujah is all about pushing the envelope, taking risks, and keeping an open mind; with that mentality we felt Nuclear Blast was the most obvious and logical step for a band such as ours. With our team behind us, we can’t wait to see Fallujah grow."

=== Dreamless (2016–2018) ===
On April 29, 2016, the band released their third album titled Dreamless. The album received critical acclaim, and a music video has been released for the song "The Void Alone" featuring guest vocalists Tori Letzler, Mike Semesky, and Katie Thompson, as well as guest guitarist Tymon Krudenier.

On July 14, 2017, Alex Hofmann announced his departure on the band's Facebook page after 10 years in the band, with Monte Barnard as substitute vocalist during the band's 2017 – 2019 live touring for Dreamless.

=== Undying Light (2019–2021) ===
On January 30, 2019, shortly after rhythm guitarist Brian James announced his departure from Fallujah, the band revealed longtime friend Anthony Palermo as their new lead vocalist and unveiled their fourth studio album Undying Light, along with the single "Ultraviolet". On November 24, 2020, the band announced that Nico Santora would be joining Fallujah full time. On July 17, 2021, the band re-released The Harvest Wombs on vinyl in a limited edition of 1,000 copies for Record Store Day.

=== Empyrean (2022–2024) ===
On April 27, 2022, the band announced that their next album "Empyrean" would be released on September 9 of that year, and released the lead single, "Radiant Ascension." On the same day, they revealed via Instagram that vocalist Antonio Palermo and bassist Rob Morey had been replaced by Kyle Schaefer and Evan Brewer. They also announced that guitarist Nico Santora had left the group, shortly after guitarist Sam Mooradian would become a part of Fallujahs "Empyrean" touring-cycle and would become their full-time rhythm guitarist on February 5, 2024.

On March 22, 2023, drummer and longtime member Andrew Baird announced that he left the band.

On June 4, 2024, the band surprise released a remixed and remastered version of "Sapphire", and announced that they would be releasing a remixed and remastered edition for the 10th-year anniversary of their 2014 album The Flesh Prevails on July 5, 2024, with the mix being re-done by Zach Ohren who has worked with the band before, and engineered, mixed and mastered the original album.

=== Xenotaph (2025–present) ===
On June 13, 2025, the band released its sixth studio album, Xenotaph, via Nuclear Blast.

== Band members ==
=== Current ===
- Scott Carstairs – lead guitar, backing vocals (2007–present), rhythm guitar (2013–2014, 2019–2020, 2022–2023)
- Kyle Schaefer – lead vocals, programming (2022–present)
- Evan Brewer – bass (2022–present)
- Sam Mooradian – rhythm guitar (2023–present; touring member 2022–present)
- Andrew Ramirez – drums (2026–present)

=== Former ===
- Dan Wissinger – bass (2007)
- Brandon "Brando" Hoberg – bass (2007–2009)
- Tommy Logan – drums (2007)
- Suliman Arghandiwal – lead vocals (2007–2008)
- Rob Maramonte – rhythm guitar (2008–2009, 2010–2013)
- Anthony Borges – rhythm guitar (2009–2010)
- Alex Hofmann – lead vocals, programming (2008–2017), rhythm guitar (2007–2008)
- Brian James – rhythm guitar (2014–2019; touring member 2013–2014)
- Rob Morey – bass (2009–2022)
- Antonio Palermo – lead vocals, programming (2019–2022)
- Nico Santora – rhythm guitar, backing vocals (2020–2022; touring member 2019–2020)
- Andrew Baird – drums (2007–2023)
- Kevin Alexander – drums (2025–2026; touring member 2024–2025)

=== Touring ===
- Chason Westmoreland – drums (2012)
- Alex Lopez – drums (2012)
- Greg Paulson – rhythm guitar (2013)
- Nic Gruhn – rhythm guitar (2013)
- Tori Letzler – clean vocals (2016)
- Monte Barnard – lead vocals (2017–2019)
- Danny Tunker – rhythm guitar (2019)
- Kilian Duarte – bass (2022–2023)
- Aron Hetsko – drums (2023)
- Lucas Koughan – bass (2024–present)

== Discography ==
Fallujah discography
- Studio albums: 6
- EPs: 2
- Demos: 2

Studio albums

List of studio albums, with selected chart positions
Year	Album details	Peak chart positions				
Year	Album details	US	US Heat.	US Indie.	US Rock	US Hard Rock
2011	The Harvest Wombs: Released: November 22, 2011; Label: Unique Leader; Formats: CD, digital download	—	—	—	—	—
2014	The Flesh Prevails: Released: July 22, 2014; Label: Unique Leader; Formats: CD, digital download	115	2	26	39	15
2016	Dreamless: Released: April 29, 2016; Label: Nuclear Blast; Formats: CD, digital download	154	1	10	15	6
2019	Undying Light: Released: March 15, 2019; Label: Nuclear Blast; Formats: CD, digital download	—	8	27	43	—
2022	Empyrean: Released: September 9, 2022; Label: Nuclear Blast; Formats: CD, digital download	—	—	—	—	—
2025	Xenotaph: Released: June 13, 2025; Label: Nuclear Blast; Formats: CD, digital download	—	—	—	—	—
"—" denotes a recording that did not chart or was not released in that territory.

EPs

List of EPs
Year	EP details
2009	Leper Colony: Released: January 17, 2009; Label: Grindhouse; Formats: n/a
2013	Nomadic: Released: April 2, 2013; Label: Unique Leader; Formats: digital download

Demos

- Demo 2009 (2009)
- Demo 2010 (2010)
