= The Faceless =

American technical death metal band

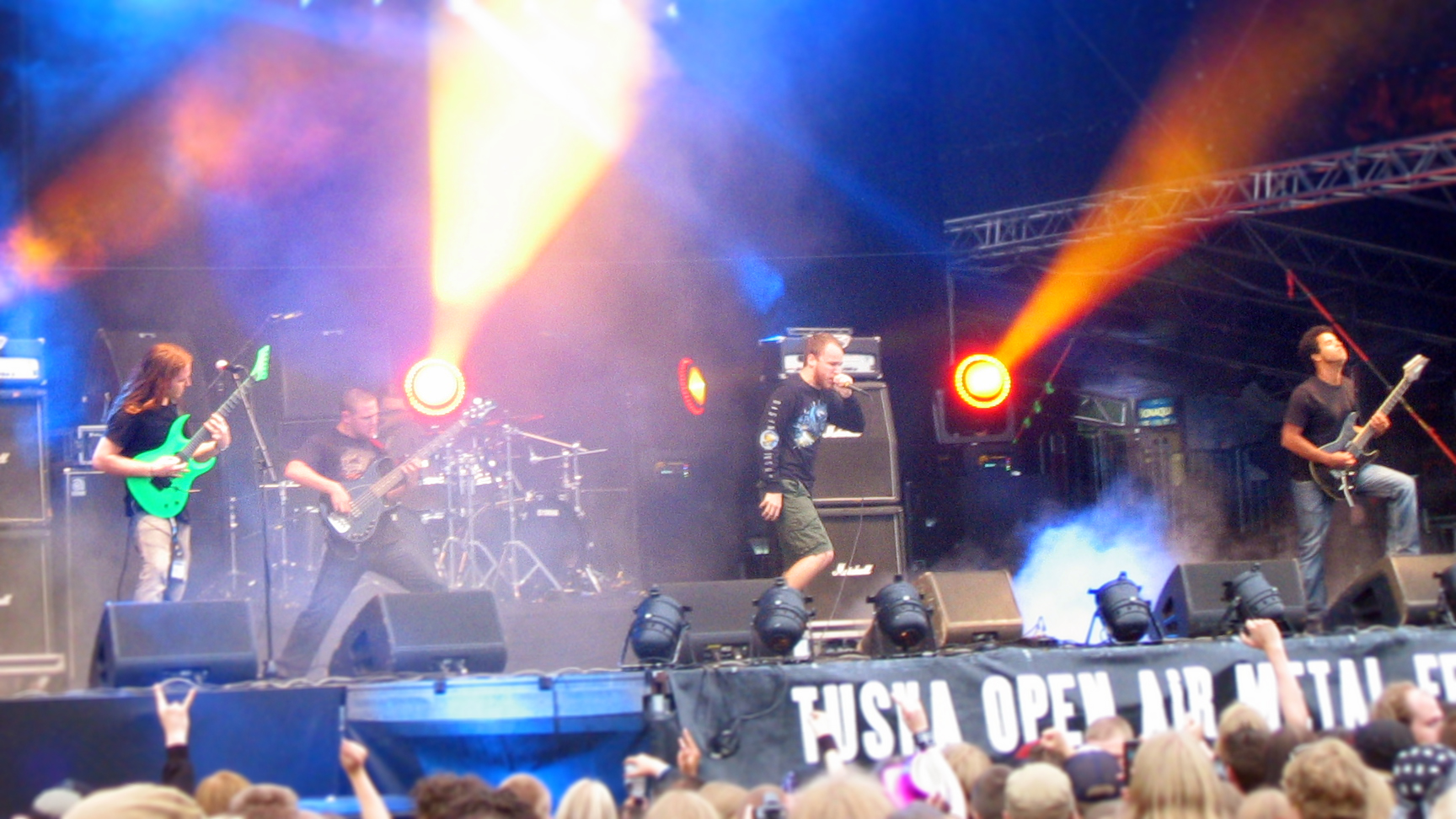
- The Faceless performing at Tuska Open Air Metal Festival 2009

Background information
- Origin: Encino, Los Angeles, California, U.S.
- Genres: Technical death metal; progressive metal; deathcore (early)
- Years active: 2004–present
- Label: Sumerian
- Members: Michael Keene; James Dorton
- Past members: See: The Faceless membership

The Faceless are an American technical death metal band from the Encino neighborhood of Los Angeles. They released their debut album, Akeldama, in November 2006, and a follow-up, Planetary Duality, in November 2008. The band's third album, Autotheism, was released on August 14, 2012. On December 1, 2017, the band released their fourth album, In Becoming a Ghost.

== History ==
Guitarist Michael Keene and bassist Brandon Giffin formed the band in Encino in 2004. In the winter of 2005, the band began work on a four-song extended-play that would become Akeldama. After recording the drum tracks, drummer Brett Batdorf left the band. After a break in the recording process, the band made the EP into a full–length record and recruited several drummers to finish the drum tracks for the remaining songs.

Following the release of Akeldama, the band toured with bands including Necrophagist, Decapitated, Nile, and The Black Dahlia Murder. The band went through several fill-in drummers before adding drummer Lyle Cooper to their line-up.

Planetary Duality debuted at number 119 on the Billboard 200. The album was critically acclaimed and brought the band a new level of success.

Soon after its release, they toured with bands including Meshuggah, Lamb of God and In Flames. Prior to their performance at California Metalfest IV, Giffin announced that he would leave the band. The band announced that they would play in The Summer Slaughter Tour of 2010 with bands including Decapitated, All Shall Perish, and Decrepit Birth.

In May 2011, Keene confirmed via Facebook that Geoffrey Ficco would replace Derek Rydquist as the band’s vocalist. Ficco performed the lead vocals on “The Eidolon Reality” pre-production preview track released on YouTube. In April 2011, bassist Evan Brewer of Animosity joined the band, replacing Giffin.

In March 2012, guitarist Steve Jones left the band and was replaced with Wes Hauch, leaving Keene as the last remaining founding member. Keene stated that “he’s moved in a different direction than us and we wish him good luck in his ventures.” Keene has stated Hauch gave the band fresh energy, praising him as “one of the finest guitar players I’ve ever had the privilege of playing with, he’s really amazing.” Keene wrote Autotheism almost entirely while being the only member of the band, with the exception "Ten Billion Years", which Hauch brought to the table and rewrote with Keene, keeping a large portion of Hauch's original arrangement with some Faceless signature elements added.

Autotheism débuted at number 50 on the Billboard 200 and hit number 1 on CMJ radio loud rock charts.

The band, along with bands including Cannibal Corpse, Between the Buried and Me, and Periphery, took part in The Summer Slaughter Tour of 2012.

In January 2013, Cooper left the band, and posted on his Facebook module regarding his departure. He claimed that the band’s goals and interests were not his own. Alex Rüdinger, formerly of The HAARP Machine, a labelmate of The Faceless, became the band’s full-time drummer.

On February 14, 2014, Wes Hauch announced he was leaving the band.

On October 20, 2014, Evan Brewer and Alex Rüdinger announced on their personal Facebook pages that they were leaving the band to pursue other projects. On December 4, 2014, vocalist Geoffrey Ficco announced his departure from the band, leaving Keene as the sole remaining member.

On February 25, 2015, The Faceless announced Justin McKinney (of The Zenith Passage) as the band's new rhythm guitarist via Facebook.

On April 12, 2015, Michael Keene announced the return of founding member and bassist Brandon Giffin.

On September 28, 2015, The Faceless shared the song "The Spiraling Void", announced a U.S. tour, and confirmed via Facebook the return of vocalist Derek "Demon Carcass" Rydquist.

On November 13, 2015, The Faceless made "The Spiraling Void" available for download, via iTunes, Amazon, and Spotify.

On April 18, 2016, The Faceless announced that they would be working under new management through E.J. Shannon Management.

On June 9, 2017, the band announced that they would play on the Summer Slaughter Tour 2017 with The Black Dahlia Murder, Dying Fetus and other bands. On the same day, the band released the song "Black Star", which featured Ken "Sorceron" Bergeron on vocals, Justin Mckinney on guitar and Chason Westmoreland on drums. It was the first The Faceless song on Drop A tuning using seven string guitars. Michael Keene tracked the bass on the album. On October 19, 2017, the band announced their fourth full-length album, In Becoming a Ghost, released on December 1, 2017.

On March 19, 2018, vocalist Ken "Sorceron" Bergeron, guitarist Justin McKinney, and drummer Bryce Butler announced they quit the band. Bergeron announced his departure earlier in the day, hours later followed by the other two members. At the time, Keene remained the only member of the band. The new lineup of the band was revealed a month later. The Faceless were expected to perform the entirety of Planetary Duality on June 10, 2018, at Bay Area Deathfest after former member Justin McKinney's band "The Zenith Passage". Their set was met with criticism after they arrived late and only performed five songs.

On July 24, 2022, Keene came under fire for arriving on-stage at a concert 45 minutes late, only to begin a heroin-charged rant about having a neurological disorder. After touring member Aaron Stechauner got Keene off stage, he performed alone on drums for a time to keep the crowd entertained. The Faceless performed two hours after the set was scheduled.

On July 25, 2022, the band announced that James Dorton of Black Crown Initiate had joined the band as lead vocalist.

== Band members ==
Current members

- Michael Keene – lead guitar (2004–present), clean vocals, vocoder (2006–present), keyboards, programming, sequencing (2007–present), rhythm guitar (2012–present), bass (2016–present), drums (2018–present)
- James Dorton – unclean vocals (2022–present)

Current live/touring members

- Andrew Virrueta – rhythm guitar (2018–present)
- Aaron Stechauner – drums (2018–present)

Former live/touring musicians

- Mica Meneke – lead vocals (2008)
- Nico Santora – rhythm guitar (2014)
- Anthony Barone – drums (2015)
- Julian Kersey – lead vocals (2015, 2018–2022)
- James Knoerl – drums (2017)
- Taylor Wientjes – lead vocals (2018)
- Gabe Seeber – drums (2018)
- Cody Pulliam – drums (2018)
- Jacob Umansky – bass (2018)

Session musicians

- Navene Koperweis – drums (2006)
- Andy Taylor – drums (2006)
- Matthew Blackmar – keyboards (2008)
- Tara Keene – backing vocals (2012)
- Sergio Flores – saxophone (2012), flute (2017)

Former members

- Steve Jones – rhythm guitar (2004–2012)
- Brandon Giffin – bass (2004–2010, 2015–2016)
- Bret Batdorf – drums (2004–2006)
- Jeff Ventimiglia – lead vocals (2004–2005)
- Mikee Domingo – lead vocals (2004; died 2014)
- Zack Graham – drums, clean vocals (2004)
- Bryce Butler – drums (2017–2018)
- Elliott Sellers – drums (2004)
- Michael Sherer – keyboards (2005–2006)
- Derek "Demon Carcass" Rydquist – lead vocals (2006–2011, 2015–2016)
- Nick Pierce – drums (2006)
- Marco Pitruzzella – drums (2007)
- Lyle Cooper – drums (2007–2013)
- Jarrad Lander – bass (2010)
- Geoffrey Ficco – lead vocals (2011–2014)
- Evan Brewer – bass (2011–2014)
- Wes Hauch – rhythm/lead guitar (2012–2014)
- Alex Rüdinger – drums (2013–2014)
- Justin McKinney – rhythm/lead guitar and orchestrations (2015–2018)
- Chason Westmoreland – drums (2015–2017)
- Ken "Sorceron" Bergeron – lead vocals (2016–2018)

Timeline

== Discography ==
Studio albums

- Akeldama (2006)
- Planetary Duality (2008)
- Autotheism (2012)
- In Becoming a Ghost (2017)

Demo albums

- Nightmare Fest (2006)

== See also ==
- List of bands from Los Angeles
- List of progressive metal bands
- List of Sumerian Records artists
- List of technical death metal bands
- Music of Los Angeles
