= Trivium discography =

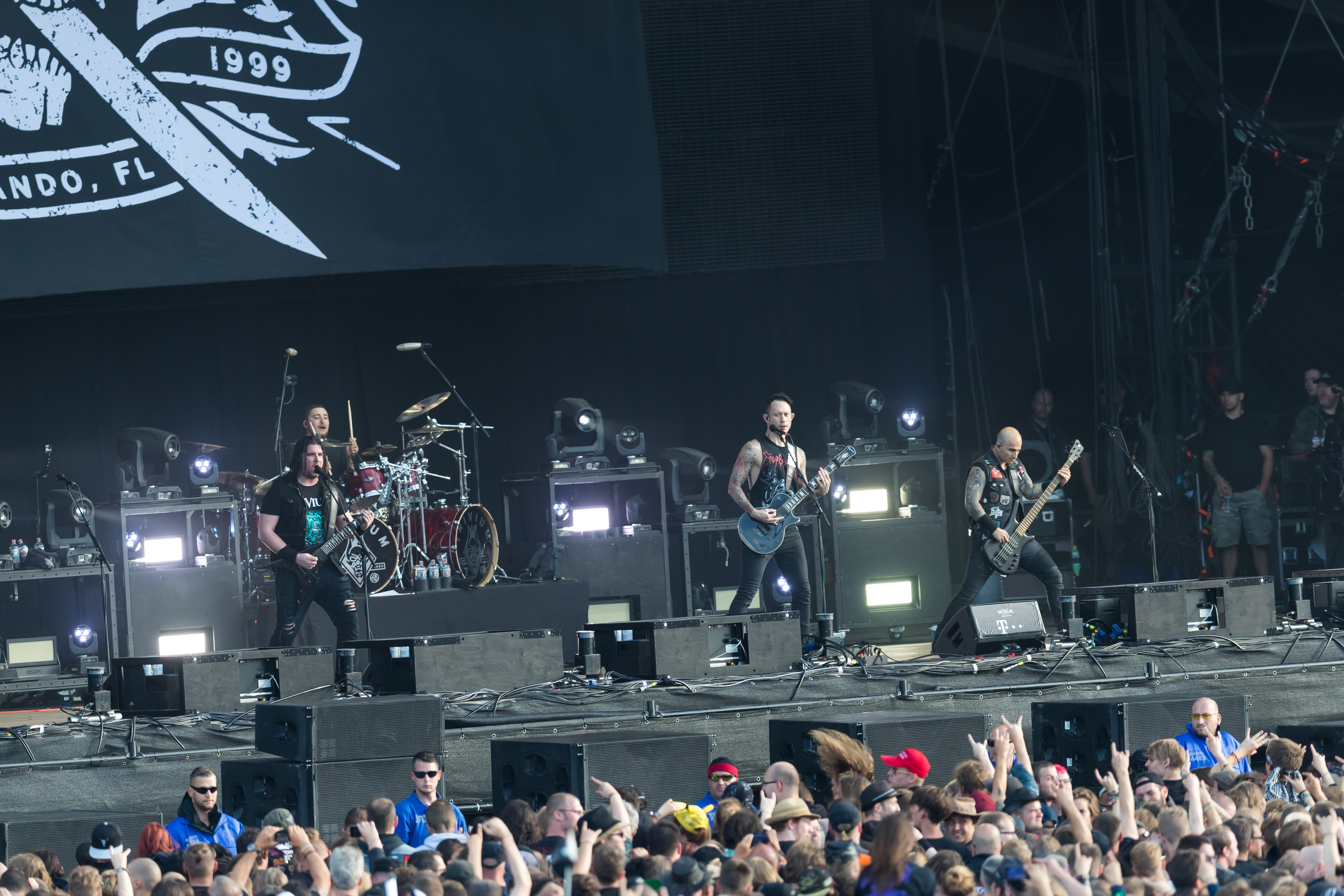
- Trivium performing in 2017
- Studio albums: 11
- Extended plays: 3
- Singles: 46
- Music videos: 38
- Demo albums: 2
- Other appearances: 3

The discography of Trivium, an American heavy metal band, consists of 11 studio albums, three extended play, two demo albums, 42 singles and 38 music videos. Formed in Orlando, Florida in 1999, the group's first recording lineup included vocalist and guitarist Matt Heafy, bassist Brent Young and drummer Travis Smith, who together released Ember to Inferno on Lifeforce Records in 2003. After the addition of guitarist Corey Beaulieu and new bassist Paolo Gregoletto in place of Young, the band signed with Roadrunner Records and released Ascendancy in 2005, which reached number 151 on the US Billboard 200. It also reached number 79 on the UK Albums Chart and was certified gold by the British Phonographic Industry (BPI). The Crusade followed in 2006, peaking at number 25 on the Billboard 200 and number 7 on the UK Albums Chart. The album's second single "Anthem (We Are the Fire)" reached number 40 on the UK Singles Chart and topped the UK Rock & Metal Singles Chart, while its third single "The Rising" was the band's first to register on the Billboard Hot Mainstream Rock Tracks chart, reaching number 32.

After the release of 2008's Shogun, which reached number 23 in the US and number 17 in the UK, Smith was replaced by Nick Augusto, who first performed on the single "Shattering the Skies Above" for the album God of War: Blood & Metal. The band's fifth studio album In Waves was released the following year, becoming the first album by the band to reach the top 20 of the US Billboard 200 when it peaked at number 13. The album's title track registered on the UK Rock & Metal Singles Chart, while "Built to Fall" and "Black" featured on the Billboard Active Rock chart. Vengeance Falls, released in 2013, peaked at number 15 in the US and number 23 in the UK, spawning the Billboard Mainstream Rock and UK Rock & Metal Singles Chart top 40 single "Strife". "Villainy Thrives" also registered on the Mainstream Rock chart at number 40. Augusto was replaced by Mat Madiro in 2014. The band released Silence in the Snow in 2015, which peaked at number 19 in both the US and the UK. The single "Until the World Goes Cold" was the band's first to reach the top ten of the Billboard Mainstream Rock Tracks chart, peaking at number 10.

In December 2016, Trivium released a deluxe edition of debut album Ember to Inferno subtitled Ab Initio, which contained both early demos as well as the 2004 Flavus demo. The album charted in Australia at number 85.

Following the addition of new drummer Alex Bent, the band released The Sin and the Sentence in October 2017, What the Dead Men Say in April 2020, and In the Court of the Dragon in October 2021.

== Albums ==
=== Studio albums ===
List of studio albums, with selected chart positions and certifications
Title	Album details	Peak chart positions										Certifications
Title	Album details	US	AUS	AUT	CAN	FRA	GER	JPN	NLD	SWI	UK	Certifications
Ember to Inferno	Released: October 14, 2003; Label: Lifeforce; Format: CD	—	—	—	—	—	—	—	—	—	—	
Ascendancy	Released: March 15, 2005; Label: Roadrunner; Format: CD	151	—	—	—	—	—	—	—	—	79	BPI: Gold
The Crusade	Released: October 10, 2006; Label: Roadrunner; Formats: CD, 2LP	25	14	44	23	115	23	46	64	92	7	BPI: Gold
Shogun	Released: September 30, 2008; Label: Roadrunner; Formats: CD, 2LP, CD+DVD, DL	23	4	30	19	75	27	17	49	42	17	BPI: Silver
In Waves	Released: August 9, 2011; Label: Roadrunner; Formats: CD, 2LP, CD+DVD, DL	13	9	17	32	74	8	28	44	24	16	
Vengeance Falls	Released: October 15, 2013; Label: Roadrunner; Formats: CD, LP, DL	15	8	10	12	78	10	18	—	27	23	
Silence in the Snow	Released: October 2, 2015; Label: Roadrunner; Formats: CD, LP, DL	19	7	11	8	81	13	41	80	19	19	
The Sin and the Sentence	Released: October 20, 2017; Label: Roadrunner; Formats: CD, 2LP, DL	23	4	10	11	71	12	59	117	21	18	
What the Dead Men Say	Released: April 24, 2020; Label: Roadrunner; Formats: CD, 2LP, DL	35	5	4	43	153	4	66	46	10	12	
In the Court of the Dragon	Released: October 8, 2021; Label: Roadrunner; Formats: CD, 2LP, DL	71	9	7	—	94	7	41	—	4	20	
Crown In The Grave	Released: November 20, 2026; Label: Roadrunner; Formats: CD, 2LP, DL	—	—	—	—	—	—	—	—	—	—	
"—" denotes a release that did not chart or was not issued in that region.

=== Demo albums ===
List of demo releases
Title	Album details
Ruber ("The Red Demo")	Released: 2001; Label: none (self-released); Format: CD
Caeruleus ("The Blue Demo")	Released: 2003; Label: none (self-released); Format: CD
Flavus ("The Yellow Demo")	Released: 2004; Label: none (self-released); Format: CD

== Extended plays ==
List of extended plays
Title	Extended play details
Shogun EP	Released: 2008; Label: Roadrunner; Format: 10"
Live from Chapman Studios	Released: 2011; Label: Roadrunner; Format: 10"
Deadmen and Dragons	Released: 2021; Label: Metal Hammer; Format: CD
Struck Dead	Release Date: October 31, 2025; Label: Roadrunner; Format: CD, LP, DL

== Singles ==
List of singles, with selected chart positions, showing year released and album name
Title	Year	Peak chart positions						Album
Title	Year	US Acti. Rock	US Hard Digi.	US Main.	US Rock Air.	UK	UK Rock	Album
"Like Light to the Flies"	2005	—	—	—	—	—	—	Ascendancy
"Pull Harder on the Strings of Your Martyr"	2005	—	—	—	—	—	—	Ascendancy
"A Gunshot to the Head of Trepidation"	2005	—	—	—	—	—	—	Ascendancy
"Dying in Your Arms"	2005	—	—	—	—	—	—	Ascendancy
"Detonation"	2006	—	—	—	—	—	—	The Crusade
"Entrance of the Conflagration"	2006	—	—	—	—	—	—	The Crusade
"Anthem (We Are the Fire)"	2006	—	—	—	—	40	1	The Crusade
"The Rising"	2007	30	—	32	—	—	—	The Crusade
"Becoming the Dragon"	2007	—	—	—	—	—	—	The Crusade
"Kirisute Gomen"	2008	—	—	—	—	—	—	Shogun
"Into the Mouth of Hell We March"	2008	—	—	—	—	—	—	Shogun
"Down from the Sky"	2009	—	—	—	—	—	—	Shogun
"Throes of Perdition"	2009	—	—	—	—	—	—	Shogun
"Shattering the Skies Above"	2010	—	—	—	—	—	—	God of War: Blood & Metal
"In Waves"	2011	—	—	—	—	—	31	In Waves
"Built to Fall"	2011	37	—	—	—	—	—	In Waves
"Black"	2012	35	—	40	—	—	—	In Waves
"Watch the World Burn"	2012	—	—	—	—	—	—	In Waves
"Brave This Storm"	2013	—	—	—	—	—	—	Vengeance Falls
"Strife"	2013	35	—	24	—	—	35	Vengeance Falls
"Through Blood and Dirt and Bone"	2014	—	—	—	—	—	—	Vengeance Falls
"Villainy Thrives"	2014	—	—	40	—	—	—	Vengeance Falls
"Silence in the Snow"	2015	—	—	—	—	—	—	Silence in the Snow
"Blind Leading the Blind"	2015	—	—	—	—	—	—	Silence in the Snow
"Until the World Goes Cold"	2015	—	—	10	34	—	—	Silence in the Snow
"Dead and Gone"	2016	—	—	24	—	—	—	Silence in the Snow
"The Sin and the Sentence"	2017	—	17	—	—	—	—	The Sin and the Sentence
"The Heart from Your Hate"	2017	—	18	25	—	—	—	The Sin and the Sentence
"Betrayer"	2017	—	—	—	—	—	—	The Sin and the Sentence
"Endless Night"	2018	—	—	28	—	—	—	The Sin and the Sentence
"Pillars of Serpents" (2019 version)	2019	—	—	—	—	—	—	Non-album singles
"I Don't Wanna Be Me" (Type O Negative cover)	2019	—	—	—	—	—	—	Non-album singles
"Drowning in the Sound"	2019	—	—	—	—	—	—	Non-album singles
"Kill the Poor" (Dead Kennedys cover)	2019	—	—	—	—	—	—	Non-album singles
"Coração Não Tem Idade (Vou Beijar) [feat. Toy]" (Toy cover)	2019	—	—	—	—	—	—	Non-album singles
"Catastrophist"	2020	—	8	—	—	—	—	What the Dead Men Say
"What the Dead Men Say"	2020	—	10	—	—	—	—	What the Dead Men Say
"Amongst the Shadows & the Stones"	2020	—	—	—	—	—	—	What the Dead Men Say
"Bleed Into Me"	2020	—	—	28	—	—	—	What the Dead Men Say
"In the Court of the Dragon"	2021	—	8	—	—	—	—	In the Court of the Dragon
"Feast of Fire"	2021	—	18	18	—	—	—	In the Court of the Dragon
"The Phalanx"	2021	—	—	—	—	—	—	In the Court of the Dragon
"Implore the Darken Sky" (Heaven Shall Burn cover)	2023	—	—	—	—	—	—	Non-album single
"Bury Me With My Screams"	2025	—	6	—	—	—	—	Struck Dead
"Six Walls Surround Me"	2025	—	5	—	—	—	—	Struck Dead
"Struck Dead"	2025	—	2	—	—	—	—	Struck Dead
"Dead Inside Of Me"	2026	—	—	—	—	—	—	Crown in the Grave
"Crown In The Grave"	2026	—	—	—	—	—	—	Crown in the Grave
"—" denotes a release that did not chart or was not issued in that region.

== Music videos ==
List of music videos, showing year released and director(s)
Title	Album	Year	Director(s)	Ref.
"Like Light to the Flies"	Ascendancy	2004	Dale Resteghini	
"Pull Harder on the Strings of Your Martyr"	Ascendancy	2005	Dale Resteghini	
"A Gunshot to the Head of Trepidation"	Ascendancy	2005	Shane Drake	
"Dying in Your Arms"	Ascendancy	2006	Dale Resteghini	
"Entrance of the Conflagration"	The Crusade	2006	Dale Resteghini	
"Anthem (We Are the Fire)"	The Crusade	2006	Nathan Cox	
"The Rising"	The Crusade	2007	Artificial Army	
"To the Rats"	The Crusade	2007	Artificial Army	
"Becoming the Dragon"	The Crusade	2007	Ramon Boutviseth	
"Down from the Sky"	Shogun	2008	Ramon Boutviseth	
"Throes of Perdition"	Shogun	2009	Ramon Boutviseth	
"Shattering the Skies Above"	God of War: Blood & Metal	2010	Unknown	
"In Waves"	In Waves	2011	Ramon Boutviseth	
"Built to Fall"	In Waves	2011	Ramon Boutviseth	
"Watch the World Burn"	In Waves	2012	Jon Paul Douglass	
"Strife"	Vengeance Falls	2013	Ramon Boutviseth	
"Through Blood and Dirt and Bone"	Vengeance Falls	2014	Luke Daley	
"Silence in the Snow"	Silence in the Snow	2015	Jon Paul Douglass	
"Blind Leading the Blind"	Silence in the Snow	2015	Unknown	
"Until the World Goes Cold"	Silence in the Snow	2015	Unknown	
"Dead and Gone"	Silence in the Snow	2016	Jon Paul Douglass	
"The Sin and the Sentence"	The Sin and the Sentence	2017	Unknown	
"The Heart from Your Hate"	The Sin and the Sentence	2017	Jon Paul Douglass	
"Thrown Into the Fire"	The Sin and the Sentence	2017	Andy J. Scott	
"Beyond Oblivion"	The Sin and the Sentence	2018	John Deeb	
"Endless Night"	The Sin and the Sentence	2018	John Deeb	
"The Wretchedness Inside"	The Sin and the Sentence	2018	Unknown	
"Catastrophist"	What the Dead Men Say	2020	Ryan Mackfall	
"What the Dead Men Say"	What the Dead Men Say	2020	Ryan Mackfall	
"Bleed Into Me"	What the Dead Men Say	2020	Ryan Mackfall	
"In the Court of the Dragon"	In the Court of the Dragon	2021	Ryan Mackfall	
"Feast of Fire"	In the Court of the Dragon	2021	John Deeb	
"The Phalanx"	In the Court of the Dragon	2021	Ryan Mackfall	
"The Shadow of the Abattoir"	In the Court of the Dragon	2022	Pavel Trebukhin	
"No Way Back Just Through"	In the Court of the Dragon	2023	Black Card Films	
"Implore the Darken Sky"	Non-album single	2023	Black Card Films	
"Bury Me With My Screams"	Struck Dead (EP)	2025	Black Card Films	
"Struck Dead (Pain Is Easier To Remember)"	Struck Dead (EP)	2025	Black Card Films	
"Dead Inside Of Me"	Crown In The Grave	2026	Pavel Trebukhin	
"Crown In The Grave"	Crown In The Grave	2026	Pavel Trebukhin	
"The Terror"	Crown In The Grave	2026	Jonpaul Douglass & Cody Cloud	

== Other appearances ==
List of other appearances, showing year released and album name
Title	Year	Album	Ref.
"Master of Puppets" (Metallica cover)	2008	Remastered: Metallica's Master of Puppets Revisited	
"Iron Maiden" (Iron Maiden cover)	2008	Maiden Heaven: A Tribute to Iron Maiden	
"For the Greater Good of God" (Iron Maiden cover)	2016	Maiden Heaven 2: An All-Star Tribute to Iron Maiden	

== See also ==
- List of songs recorded by Trivium
