= List of Trivium band members =

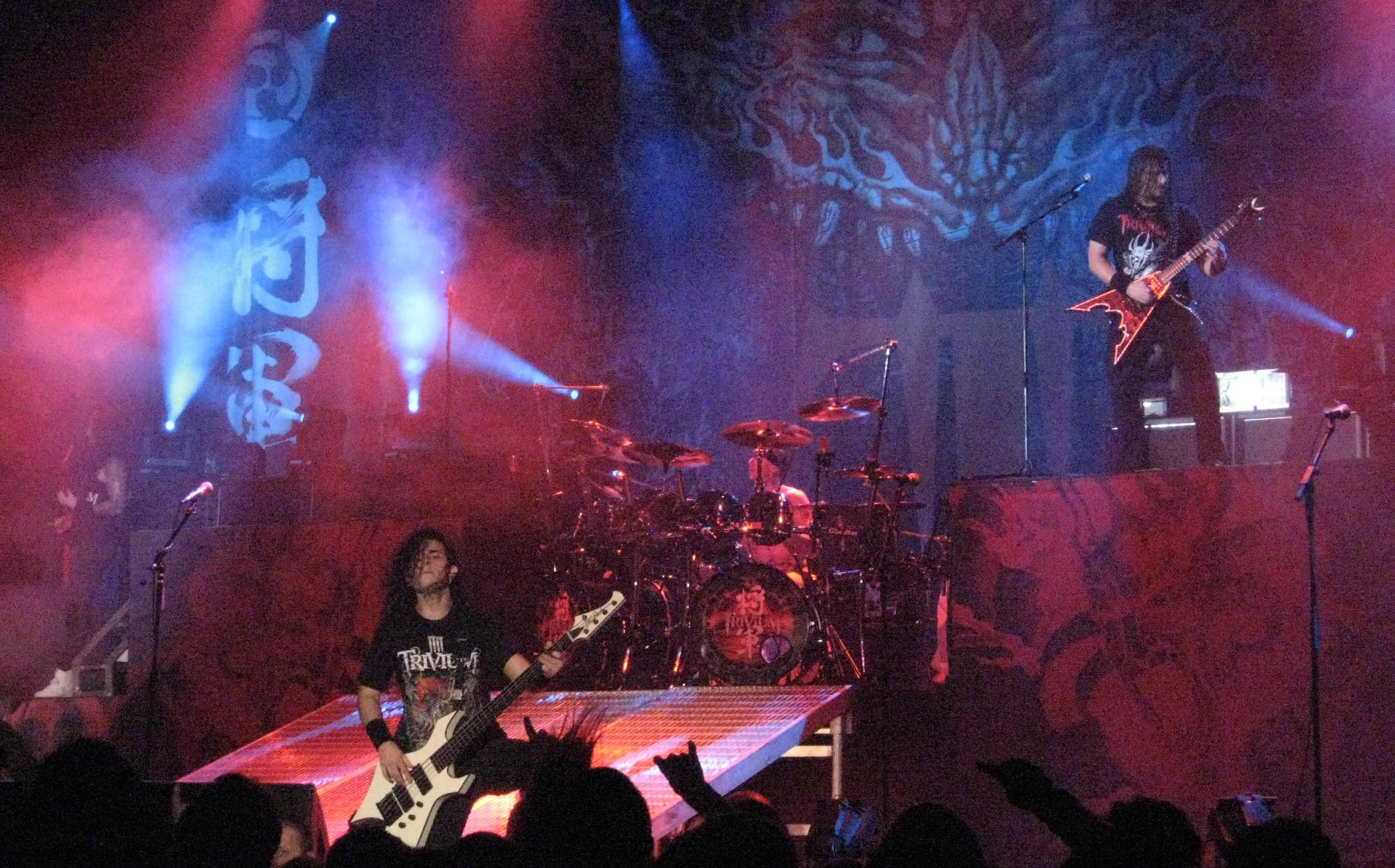
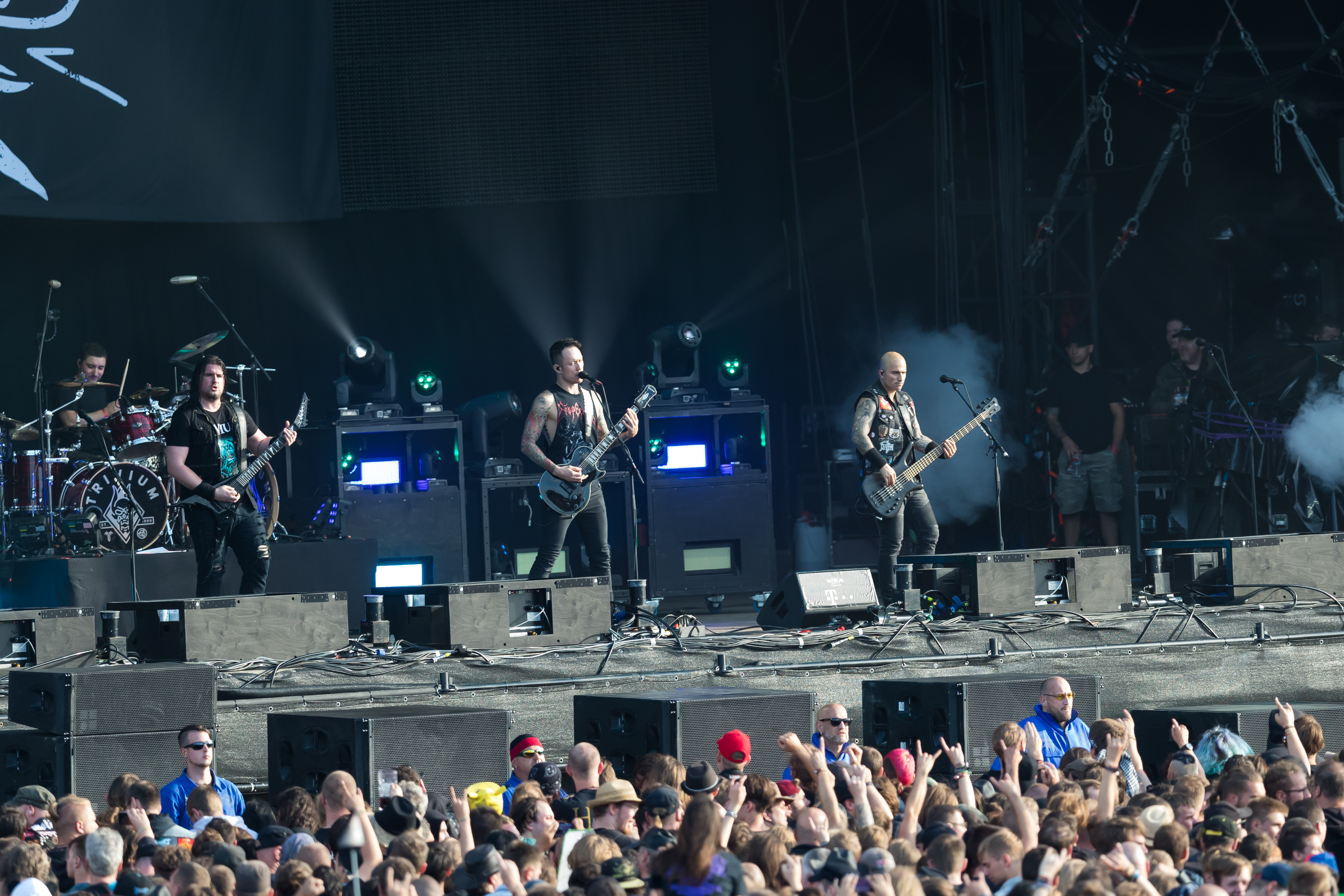
Two line-ups of Trivium performing live in 2008 (top) and 2017 (bottom).

Trivium is an American heavy metal band from Orlando, Florida. Formed in 1999, the group originally featured bassist and vocalist Brad Lewter, guitarist Jarred Bonaparte, and drummer Travis Smith, who were joined shortly after forming by guitarist Matt Heafy. The band's current line-up features Heafy on guitar and lead vocals, alongside second guitarist Corey Beaulieu (since 2003), bassist Paolo Gregoletto (since 2004), and drummer Alex Rüdinger (since 2025).

== History ==
=== 1999–2006 ===
Trivium was formed in 1999 by Brad Lewter, Jarred Bonaparte and Travis Smith, all of whom were students at Lake Brantley High School. Shortly after the band's formation, 13-year-old Matt Heafy was enlisted as a second guitarist by Lewter, after he saw him perform at a school talent show. Lewter later left the band in 2000 due to differing musical tastes from the other three members, after which Heafy took over as lead vocalist. Trivium subsequently became a four-piece with the addition of guitarist Brent Young, as Bonaparte moved over to the role of bassist. Bonaparte would also later leave the group after choosing to attend college, with Richie Brown taking over on a temporary basis. After Brown's departure, Young took over on bass and Trivium reverted to a three-piece again.

After finalizing their line-up, Trivium signed to Lifeforce Records and recorded their debut album Ember to Inferno. In August 2003, the band briefly recruited The Autumn Offering's George Moore as a second guitarist, although he had left again within a few weeks after his first band signed a record deal. The guitarist spot was later filled long-term by Corey Beaulieu, who officially joined the band that September. In April 2004, the band signed with Roadrunner Records, shortly after which Young left the band (he was replaced for the tour in June by Monstrosity's Mike Poggione). After taking over for Poggione on the tour in August, Paolo Gregoletto was officially announced as Trivium's new bassist and backing vocalist in November 2004. The band released Ascendancy in March 2005.

=== Since 2006 ===
Trivium kept a consistent line-up for 2006's The Crusade and 2008's Shogun, before Smith was fired from the band in 2010 after choosing not to be involved in the late-2009 tour in order to "take care of some personal business". His initial replacement Nick Augusto was later confirmed as the new full-time drummer for the band. Augusto performed on In Waves (2011) and Vengeance Falls (2013) before he was asked to leave in 2014, with Gregoletto explaining that their relationship with the drummer "began to fray". Drum technician Mat Madiro took his place, initially on a temporary basis, although he remained for the recording of 2015's Silence in the Snow. Madiro was replaced in December 2015 by Paul Wandtke, who remained in the group for around a year before he was replaced by Alex Bent.

In October 2018, Heafy announced that he would be unavailable for a string of upcoming dates due to his wife's pregnancy, with Light the Torch frontman Howard Jones, Avatar frontman Johannes Eckerström and YouTube personality Jared Dines taking his place. In September 2020, early Trivium member Brent Young died. In October 2025, longtime drummer Alex Bent left the band and was replaced by Sepultura drummer Greyson Nekrutman, as a temporary member. Nekrutman played with the band at Aftershock festival, before Alex Rüdinger joined as a full time drummer.

== Members ==
=== Current ===
Image	Name	Years active	Instruments	Release contributions
	Matt Heafy	1999–present	guitars; lead vocals (2000–present); backing vocals (1999–2000); bass (2004)	all Trivium releases
	Corey Beaulieu	2003–present	guitars; backing and unclean vocals	all Trivium releases from Flavus ("The Yellow Demo") (2004) onwards
	Paolo Gregoletto	2004–present	bass; backing vocals	all Trivium releases from Ascendancy (2005) onwards
	Alex Rüdinger	2025–present	drums; percussion	Crown In The Grave (2026)

=== Former ===
Image	Name	Years active	Instruments	Release contributions
	Travis Smith	1999–2010	drums; percussion	all Trivium releases from Ruber ("The Red Demo") (2001) to Shogun (2008)
	Jarred Bonaparte	1999–2001	bass (2000–2001); guitars (1999–2000)	none
	Brad Lewter	1999–2000	lead vocals; bass	none
	Brent Young	2000–2004 (died 2020)	guitars (2000–2001); bass (2001–2004); backing vocals	Ruber ("The Red Demo") (2001); Caeruleus ("The Blue Demo") (2003); Ember to Inferno (2003); Flavus ("The Yellow Demo") (2004)
	Richie Brown	2001	bass; backing vocals	none
	Nick Augusto	2010–2014	drums; percussion	In Waves (2011); Vengeance Falls (2013)
	Mat Madiro	2014–2015	drums; percussion	Silence in the Snow (2015)
	Paul Wandtke	2015–2017	drums; percussion	none
	Alex Bent	2017–2025	drums; percussion	all Trivium releases from The Sin and the Sentence (2017) to Struck Dead (2025)

=== Touring ===
Image	Name	Years active	Instruments	Notes
	George Moore	2003	guitars	Moore, from The Autumn Offering, joined as second guitarist in August 2003 but departed soon after.
	Mike Poggione	2004	bass	Poggione briefly filled in after Young's departure, before Gregoletto joined in his place.
	Doc Coyle	2009	bass	God Forbid guitarist Coyle briefly replaced Gregoletto for the Into the Mouth of Hell We Tour in 2009.
	Johannes Eckerström	2018	lead vocals	Avatar's Eckerström, Light the Torch's Jones and Dines replaced Heafy for the North American Tour in late 2018.
	Howard Jones	2018	lead vocals	Avatar's Eckerström, Light the Torch's Jones and Dines replaced Heafy for the North American Tour in late 2018.
	Jared Dines	2018	guitars	Avatar's Eckerström, Light the Torch's Jones and Dines replaced Heafy for the North American Tour in late 2018.
	Josh Baines	2023	bass; backing vocals	Malevolence guitarist Baines replaced Gregoletto when the bassist underwent Hernia surgery.
	Greyson Nekrutman	2025	drums; percussion	Sepultura's Nekrutman joined as touring drummer after Bent's departure.

== Line-ups ==
Period	Members	Releases
1999	Brad Lewter – bass, vocals; Jarred Bonaparte – guitar; Travis Smith – drums, percussion	none
1999–2000	Brad Lewter – bass, lead vocals; Jarred Bonaparte – guitar; Matt Heafy – guitar, backing vocals; Travis Smith – drums, percussion	none
2000–2001	Matt Heafy – guitar, lead vocals; Brent Young – guitar, backing vocals; Jarred Bonaparte – bass; Travis Smith – drums, percussion	none
July – October 2001	Matt Heafy – guitar, lead vocals; Brent Young – guitar, backing vocals; Richie Brown – bass, backing vocals; Travis Smith – drums, percussion	none
October 2001 – August 2003	Matt Heafy – guitar, lead vocals; Brent Young – bass, backing vocals; Travis Smith – drums, percussion	Ruber ("The Red Demo") (2001)
August – September 2003	Matt Heafy – guitar, lead vocals; George Moore – guitar; Brent Young – bass, backing vocals; Travis Smith – drums, percussion	none
September 2003 – April 2004	Matt Heafy – guitar, lead vocals; Corey Beaulieu – guitar, backing vocals; Brent Young – bass, backing vocals; Travis Smith – drums, percussion	Caeruleus ("The Blue Demo") (2003); Ember to Inferno (2003); Flavus ("The Yellow Demo") (2004)
April – November 2004	Matt Heafy – guitar, lead vocals, bass; Corey Beaulieu – guitar, backing vocals; Travis Smith – drums, percussion	none
November 2004 – February 2010	Matt Heafy – guitar, lead vocals; Corey Beaulieu – guitar, backing vocals; Paolo Gregoletto – bass, backing vocals; Travis Smith – drums, percussion	Ascendancy (2005); The Crusade (2006); Shogun (2008)
February 2010 – May 2014	Matt Heafy – guitar, lead vocals; Corey Beaulieu – guitar, backing vocals; Paolo Gregoletto – bass, backing vocals; Nick Augusto – drums, percussion	In Waves (2011); Vengeance Falls (2013)
May 2014 – December 2015	Matt Heafy – guitar, lead vocals; Corey Beaulieu – guitar, backing vocals; Paolo Gregoletto – bass, backing vocals; Mat Madiro – drums, percussion	Silence in the Snow (2015)
December 2015 – December 2016	Matt Heafy – guitar, lead vocals; Corey Beaulieu – guitar, backing vocals; Paolo Gregoletto – bass, backing vocals; Paul Wandtke – drums, percussion	none
December 2016 – October 2025	Matt Heafy – guitar, lead vocals; Corey Beaulieu – guitar, backing vocals; Paolo Gregoletto – bass, backing vocals; Alex Bent – drums, percussion	The Sin and the Sentence (2017); What the Dead Men Say (2020); In the Court of the Dragon (2021); "Implore the Darken Sky" (2023); Struck Dead (2025)
Aftershock 2025	Matt Heafy – guitar, lead vocals; Corey Beaulieu – guitar, backing vocals; Paolo Gregoletto – bass, backing vocals; Greyson Nekrutman – drums, percussion (touring)	none
October 2025 - onward	Matt Heafy – guitar, lead vocals; Corey Beaulieu – guitar, backing vocals; Paolo Gregoletto – bass, backing vocals; Alex Rüdinger – drums, percussion	none

== Bibliography ==
- Sharpe-Young, Garry (2005), New Wave of American Heavy Metal, New Plymouth, New Zealand: Zonda Books, ISBN 978-0958268400
- Shooman, Joe (September 21, 2006), Trivium: The Mark of Perseverance, London, England: John Blake Publishing, ISBN 978-1786061508
