= List of songs recorded by Trivium =

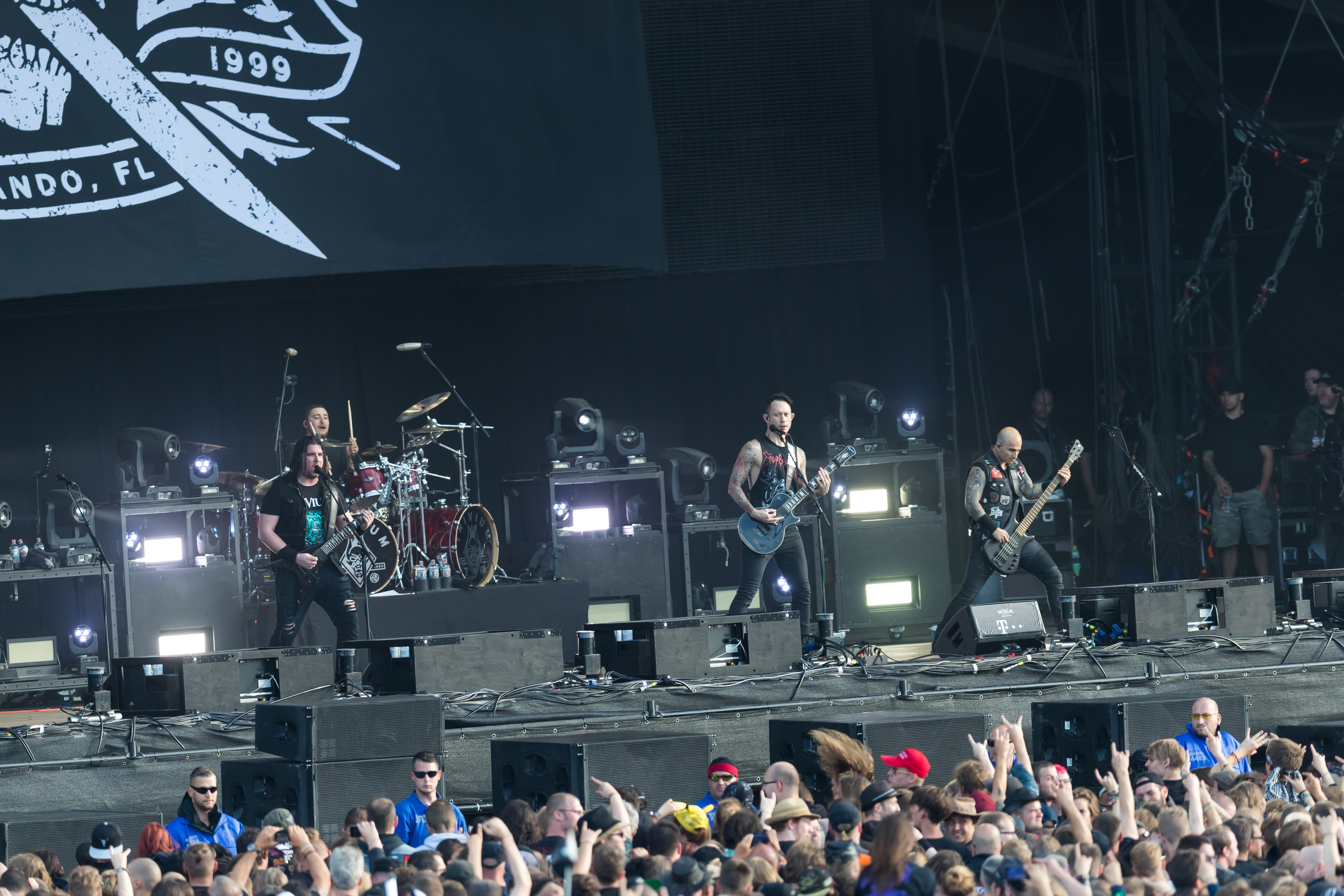
Trivium performing in 2017. From left to right: Corey Beaulieu, Alex Bent, Matt Heafy and Paolo Gregoletto.

Trivium is an American heavy metal band from Orlando, Florida. Formed in 1999, the group's first recording lineup included vocalist and guitarist Matt Heafy, bassist Brent Young and drummer Travis Smith. After a pair of demos, the band released its debut studio album Ember to Inferno in 2003, which was written entirely by Heafy. Guitarist Corey Beaulieu joined after the album's recording, and the following year Paolo Gregoletto replaced Young. The band released Ascendancy in 2005, which featured songwriting credits for Beaulieu and producer Jason Suecof. The album was followed the next year by The Crusade, written by Heafy with Beaulieu and Gregoletto. Also in 2006, the band recorded a cover version of Metallica's "Master of Puppets" for the Kerrang! release Remastered: Metallica's Master of Puppets Revisited.

Shogun was released in 2008, credited to the whole band. The band also covered "Iron Maiden", originally by the band of the same name, for the Kerrang! tribute album Maiden Heaven: A Tribute to Iron Maiden the same year. In 2010, Nick Augusto replaced Smith and co-wrote and performed on "Shattering the Skies Above" for the compilation God of War: Blood & Metal, followed by 2011's In Waves and 2013's Vengeance Falls. He left in 2014, with the band's former drum technician Mat Madiro taking his place for the 2015 album Silence in the Snow, again credited to the whole band. In late 2015, Paul Wandtke joined the band to replace Madiro. Trivium recorded another Iron Maiden cover for the 2016 follow-up to Maiden Heaven, contributing the track "For the Greater Good of God" to the free Kerrang! companion album.

In December 2016, Trivium released a deluxe edition of debut album Ember to Inferno subtitled Ab Initio, which contained both early demos as well as the 2004 Flavus demo. Following the addition of new drummer Alex Bent, the band released The Sin and the Sentence in October 2017, which was written by Heafy, Beaulieu and Gregoletto.

== Songs ==
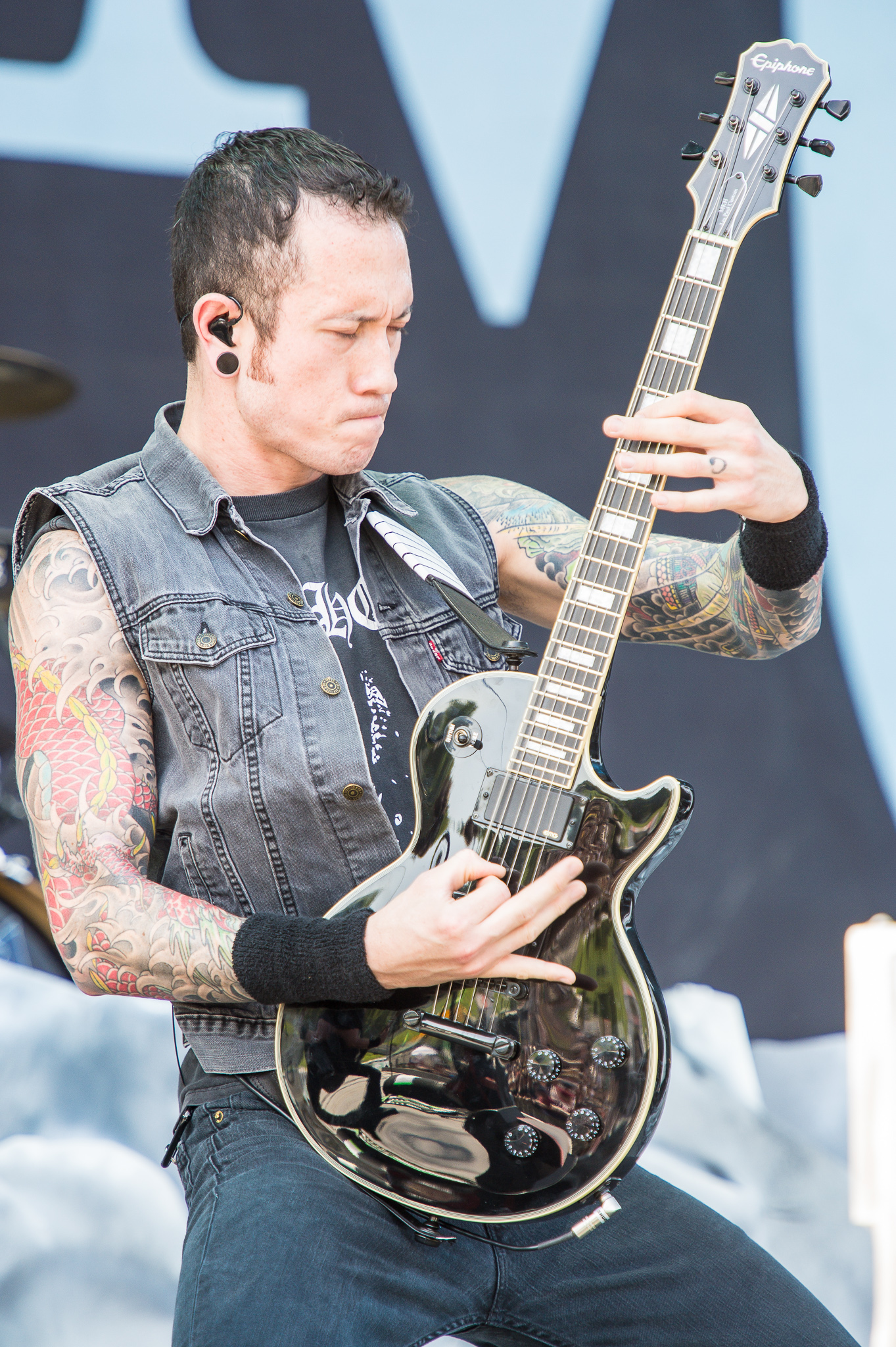
Trivium frontman Matt Heafy typically leads the band's songwriting process, including writing most of the lyrics.

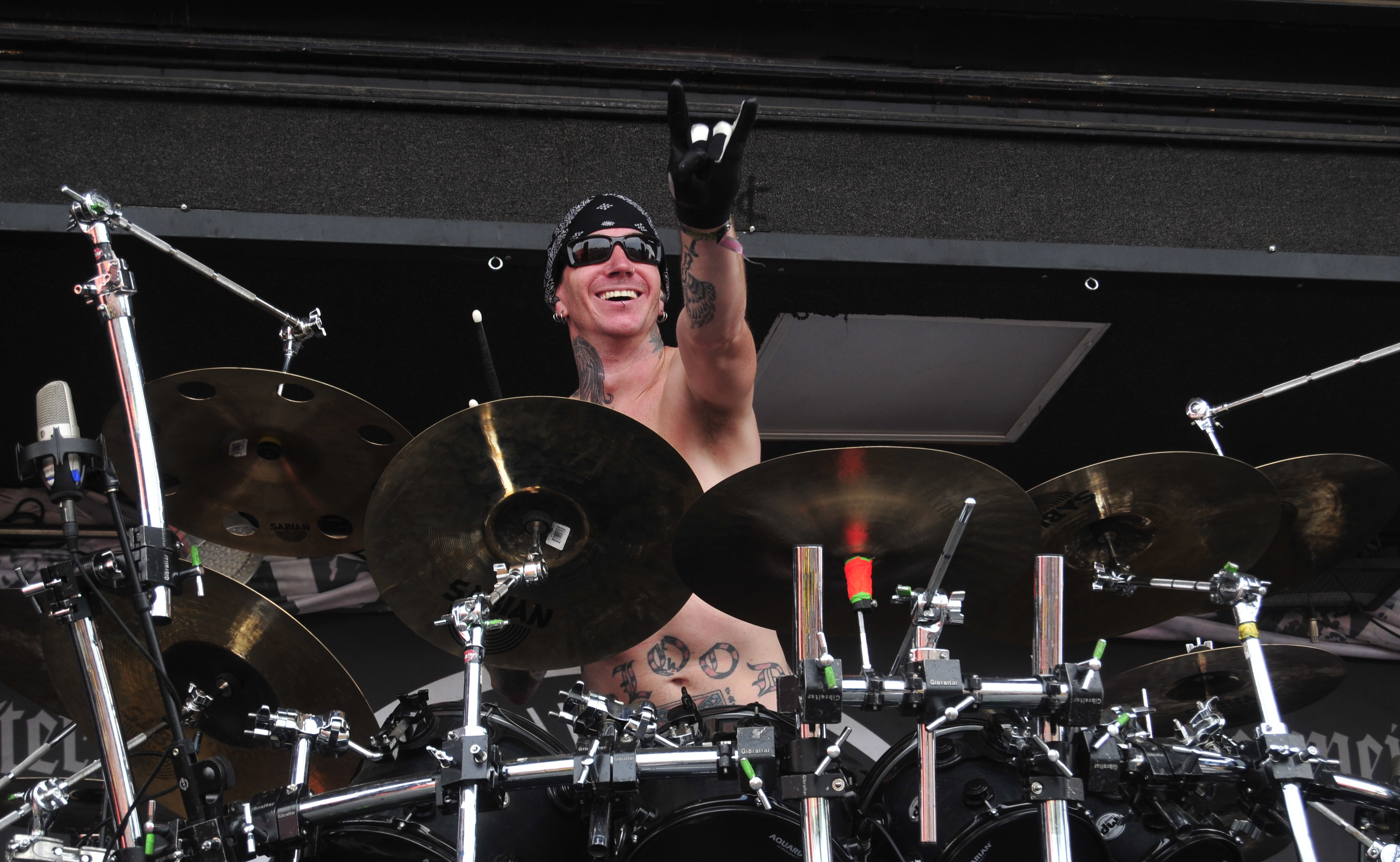
Drummer Travis Smith contributed to the band's first four albums, from 2003's Ember to Inferno to 2008's Shogun.

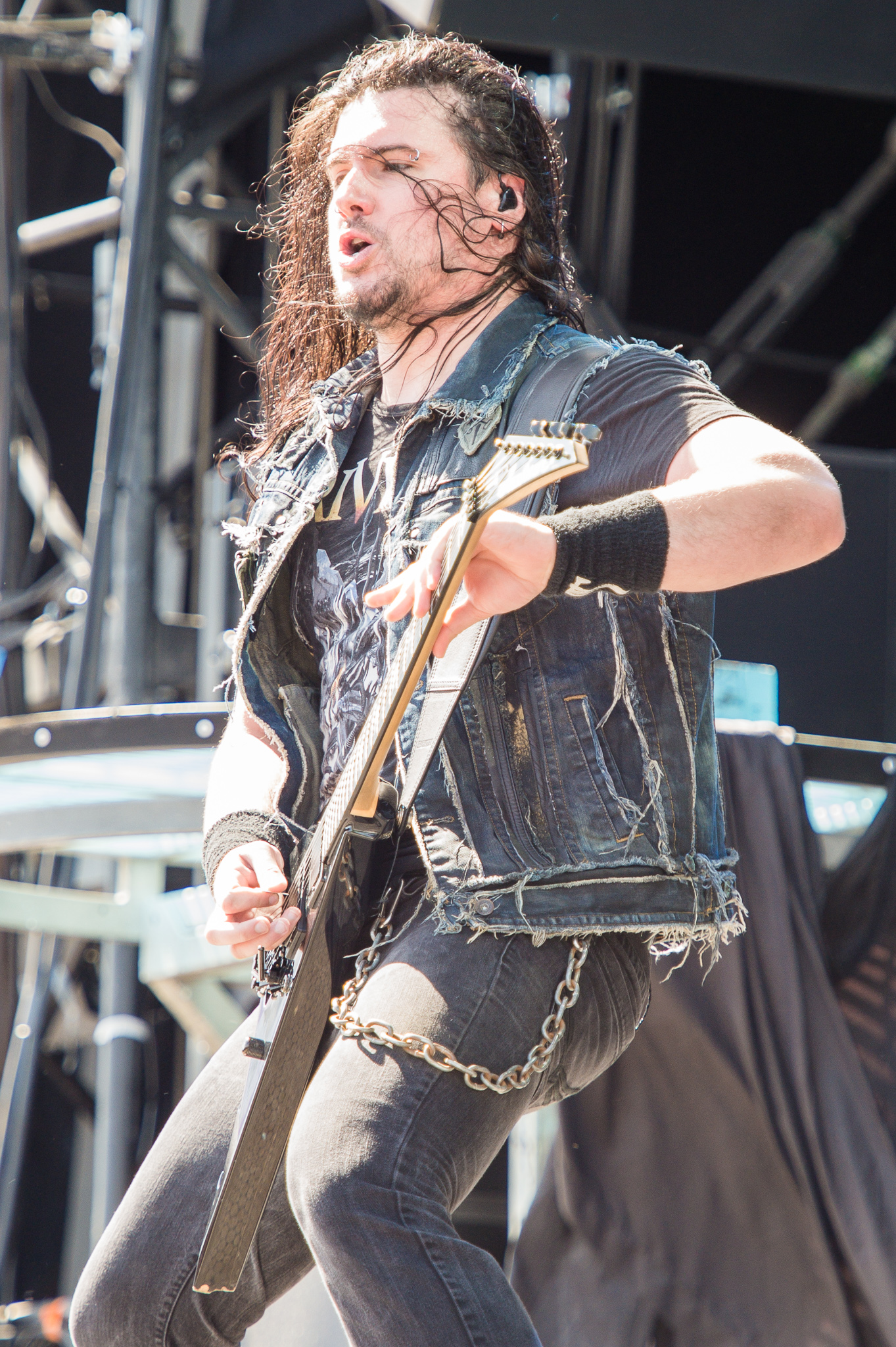
Guitarist Corey Beaulieu joined the band in 2003 and has performed on every Trivium album since Ascendancy.

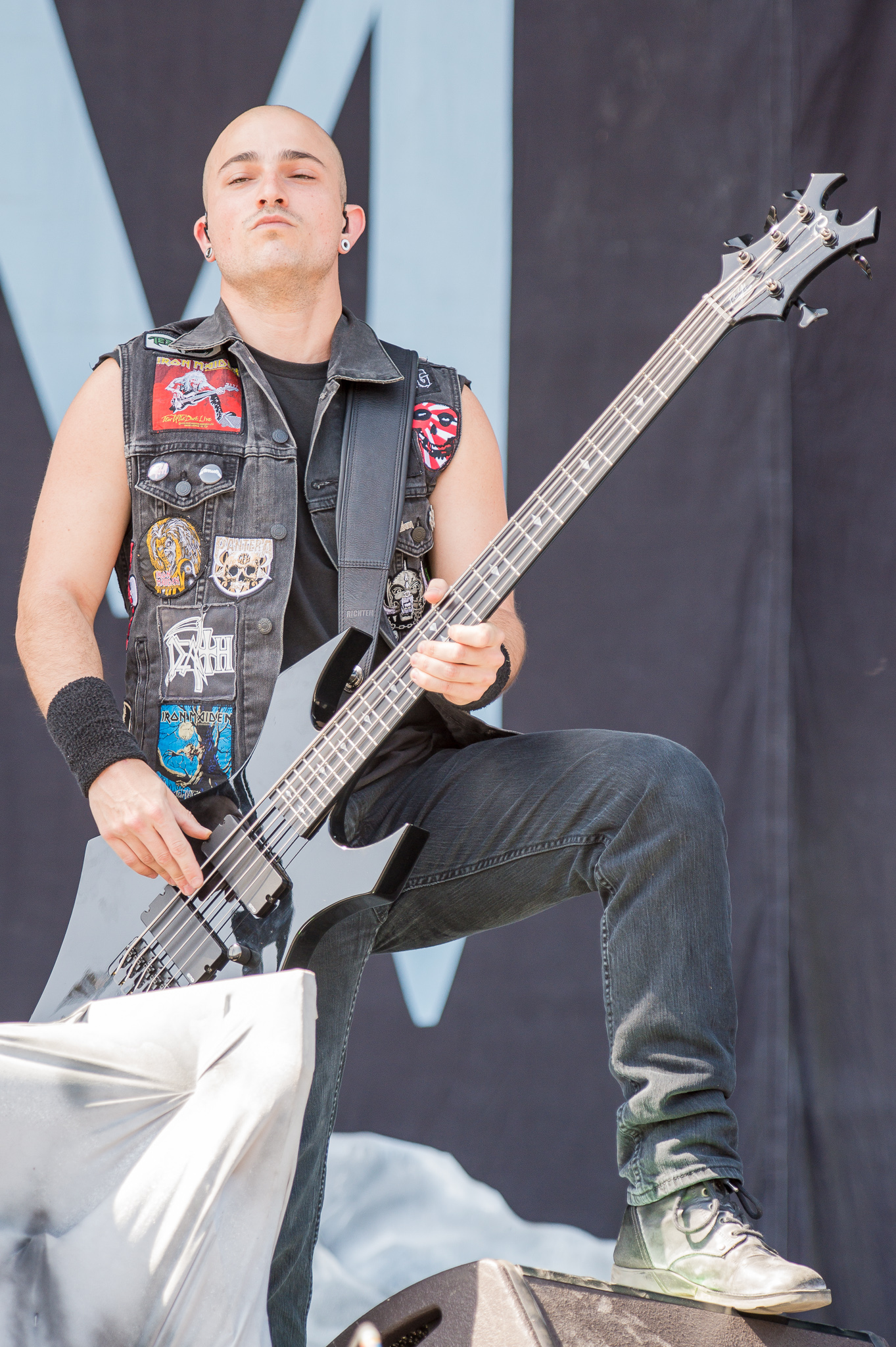
2004 saw the addition of bassist Paolo Gregoletto, who was first credited for songwriting on 2006's The Crusade.

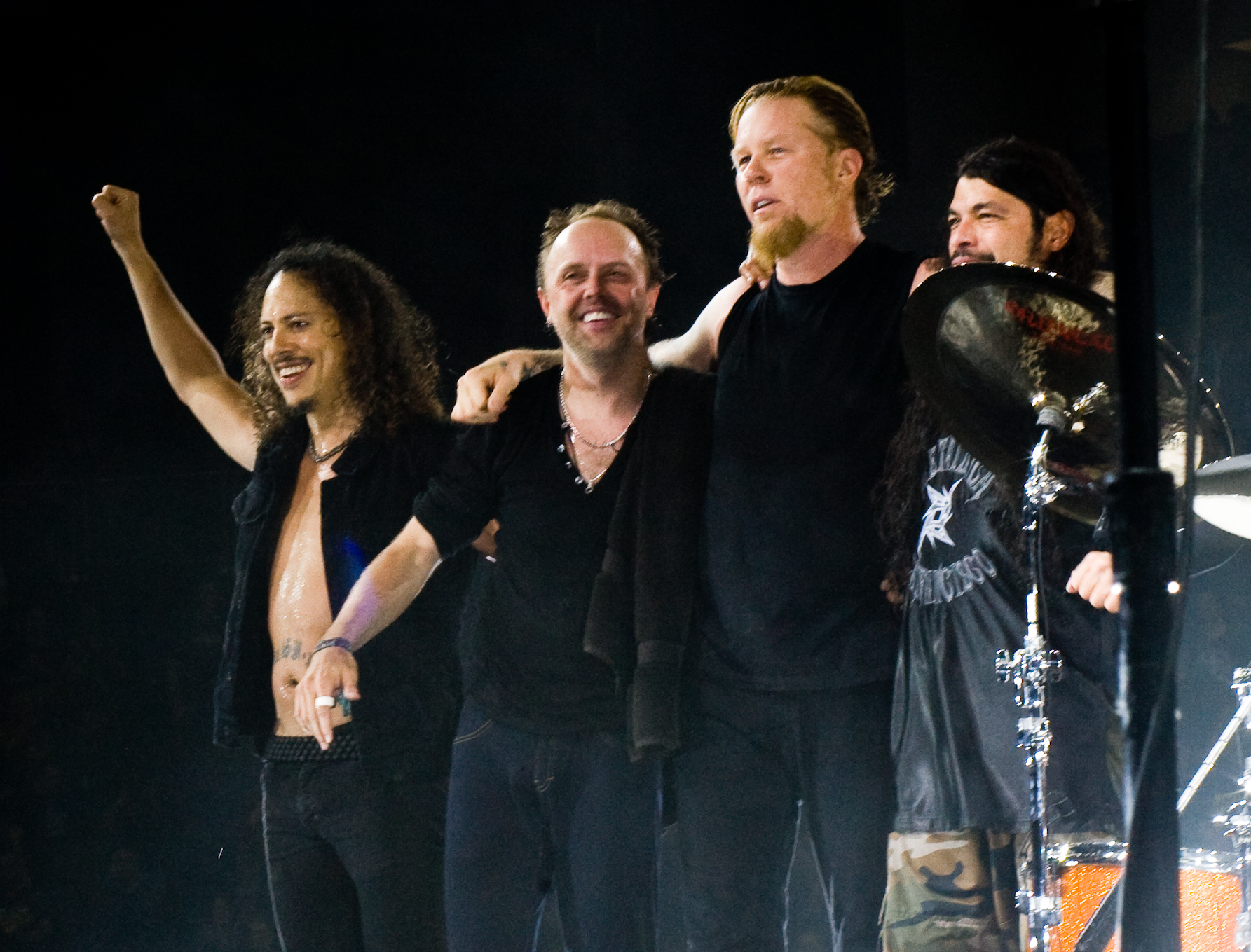
Trivium covered "Master of Puppets" for the Metallica tribute album Remastered: Metallica's Master of Puppets Revisited, released by Kerrang! in 2006.

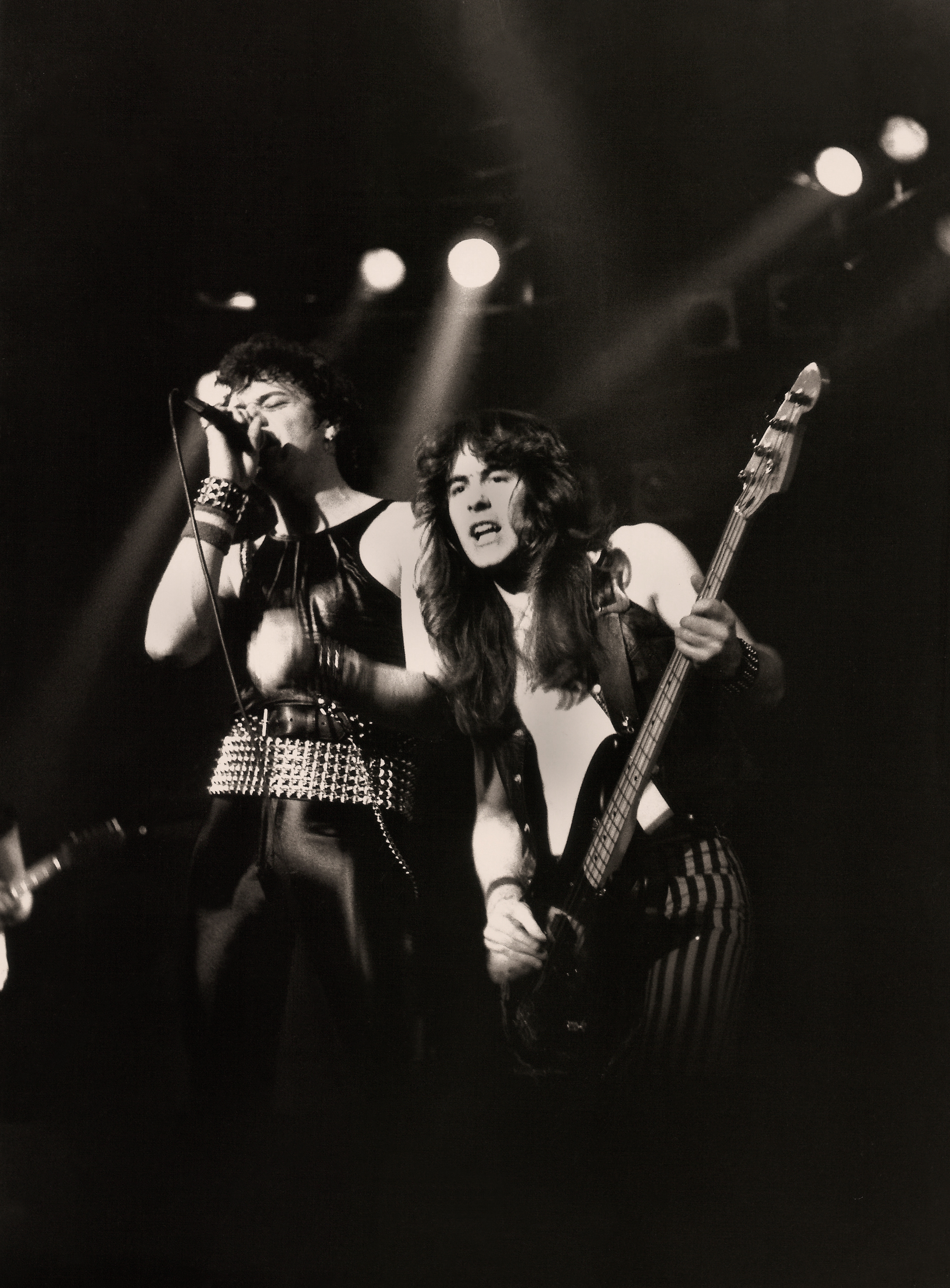
The band has contributed covers of Iron Maiden tracks "Iron Maiden" and "For the Greater Good of God" to tribute albums in 2008 and 2016, respectively.

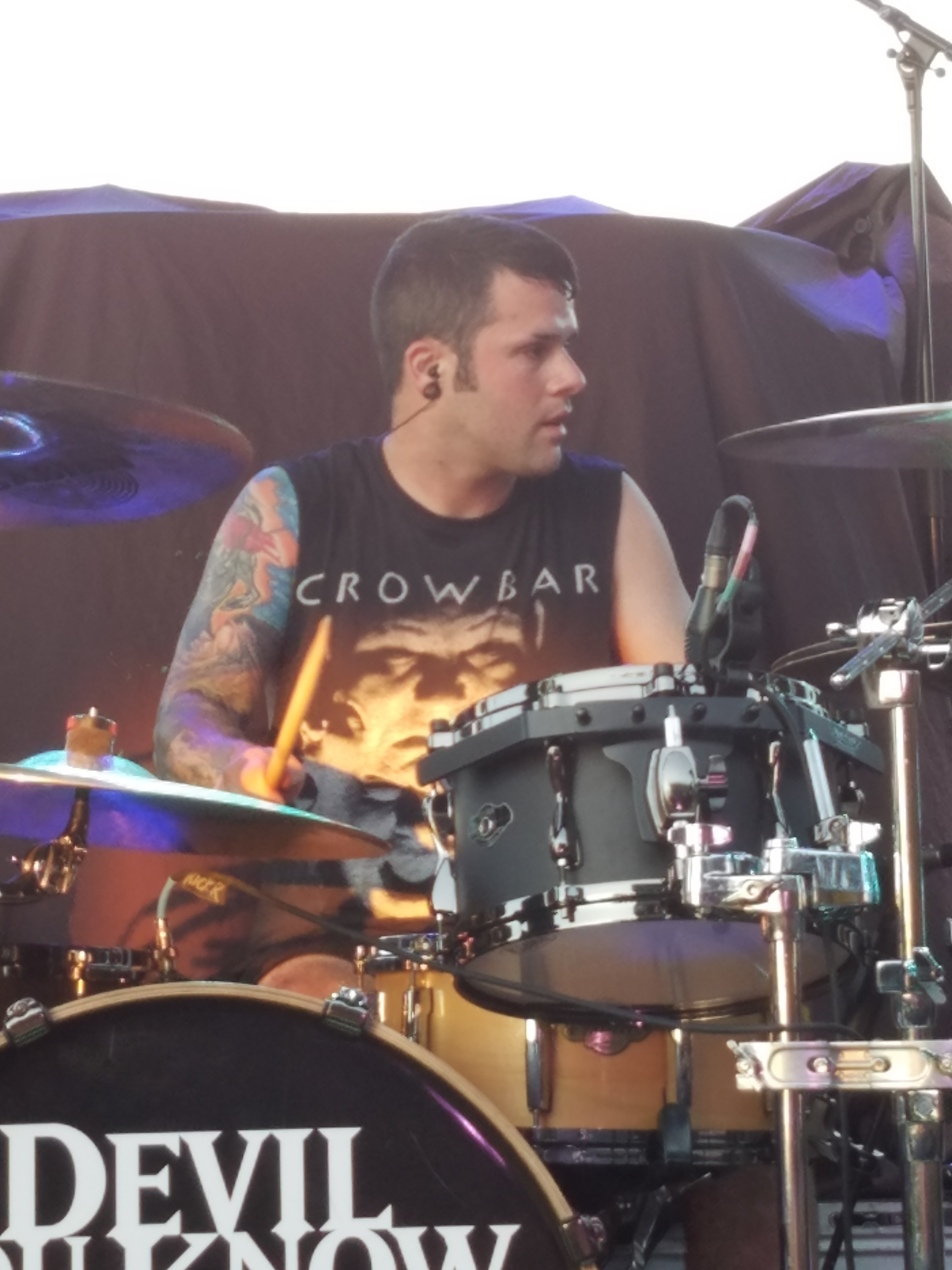
Nick Augusto replaced Smith on drums in 2010, performing on 2011's In Waves and 2013's Vengeance Falls.

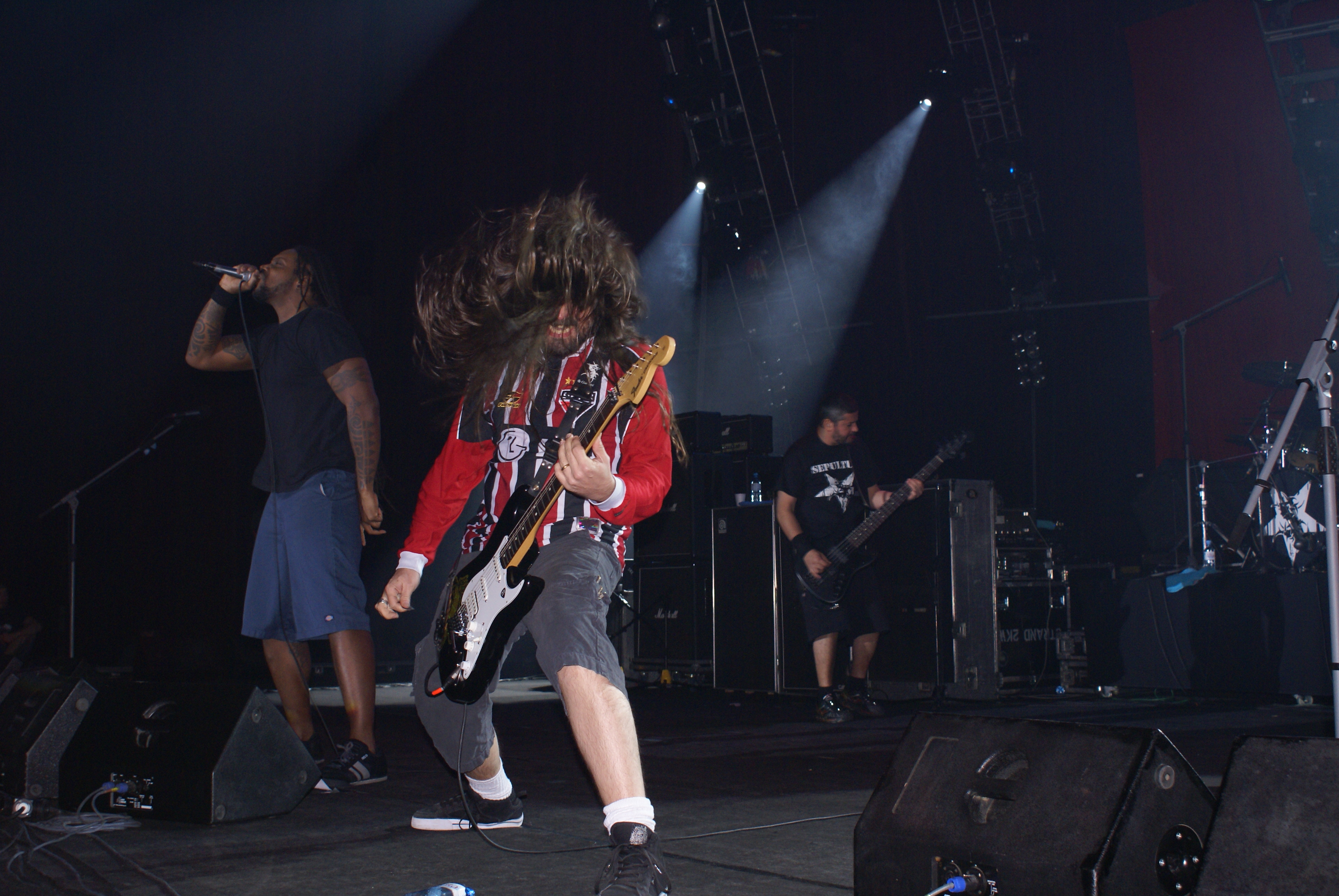
The band covered Sepultura's "Slave New World" and released it on special editions of In Waves.

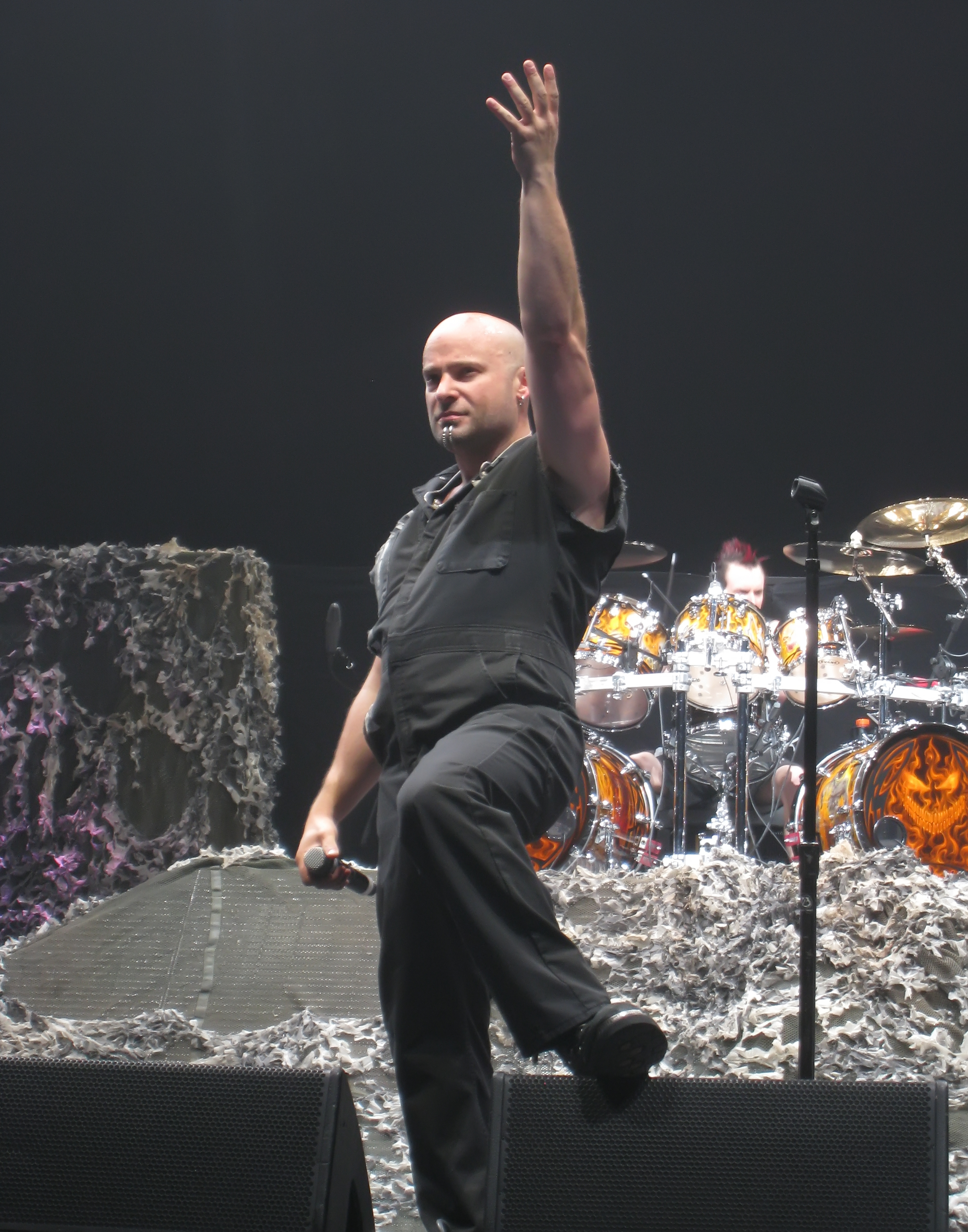
Disturbed frontman David Draiman produced the band's sixth album Vengeance Falls.

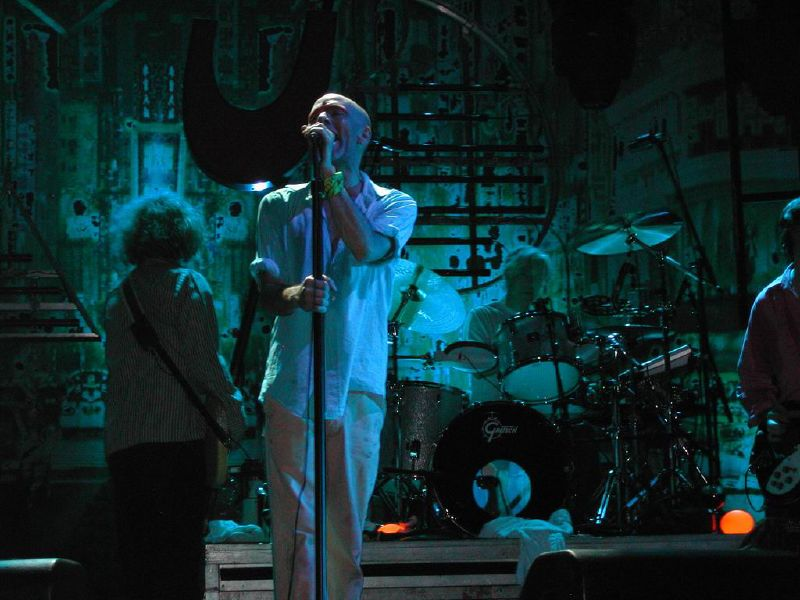
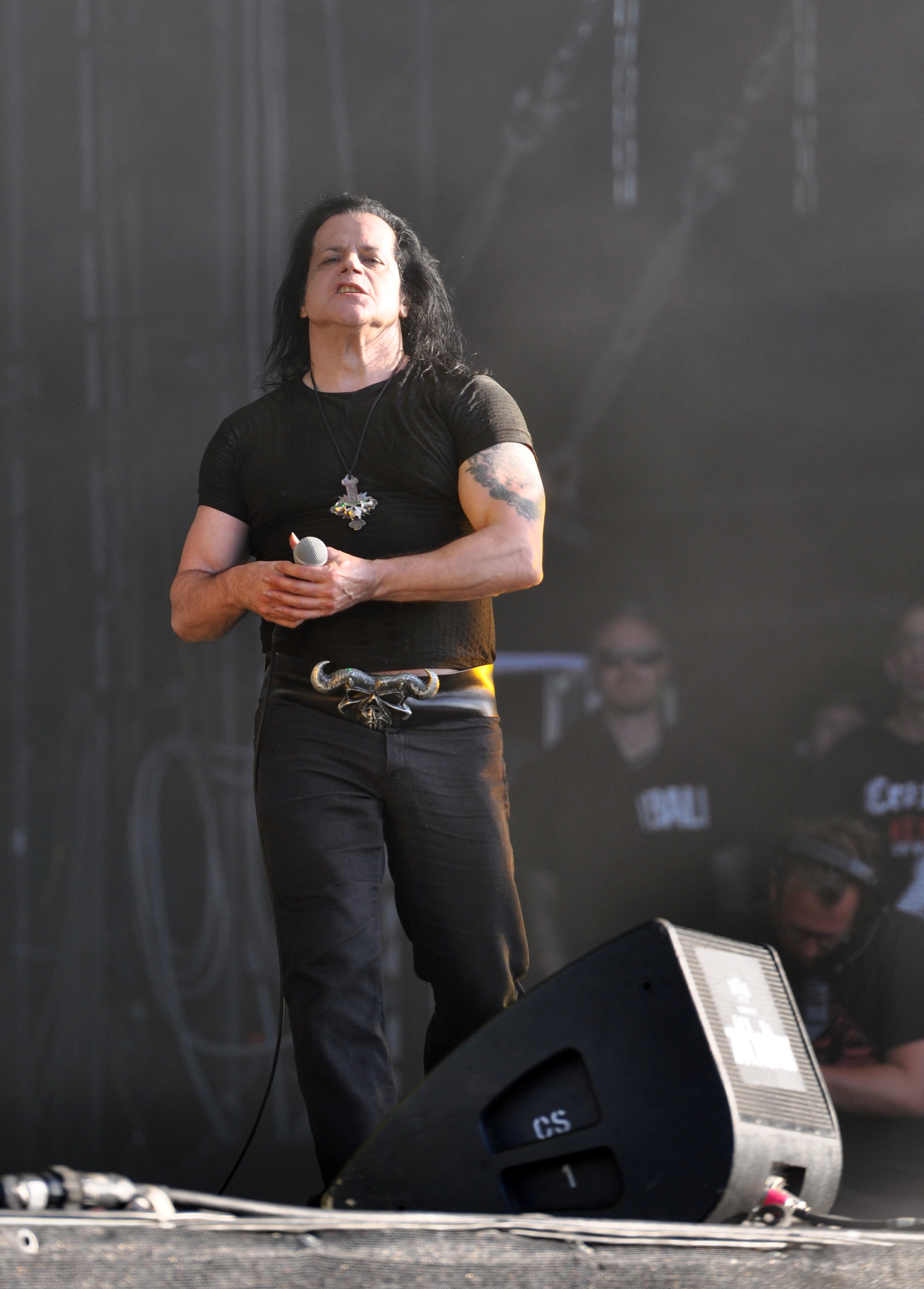
Special editions of Vengeance Falls feature a cover version of "Losing My Religion" by R.E.M. (top) and a medley of the Misfits tracks "Skulls" and "We Are 138", both written by Glenn Danzig (bottom).

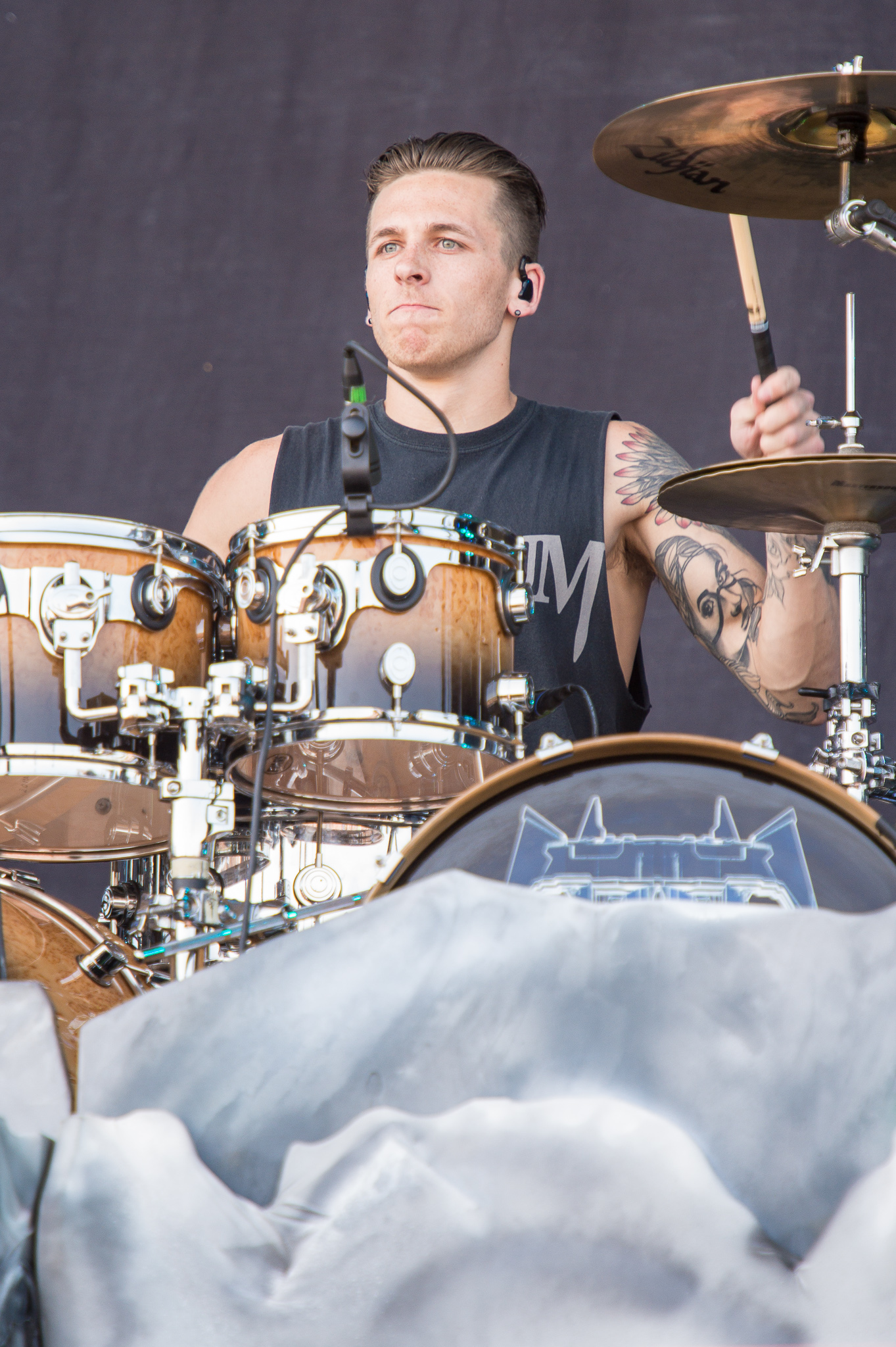
Mat Madiro joined the band in 2014 after the departure of Augusto, performing on 2015's Silence in the Snow.

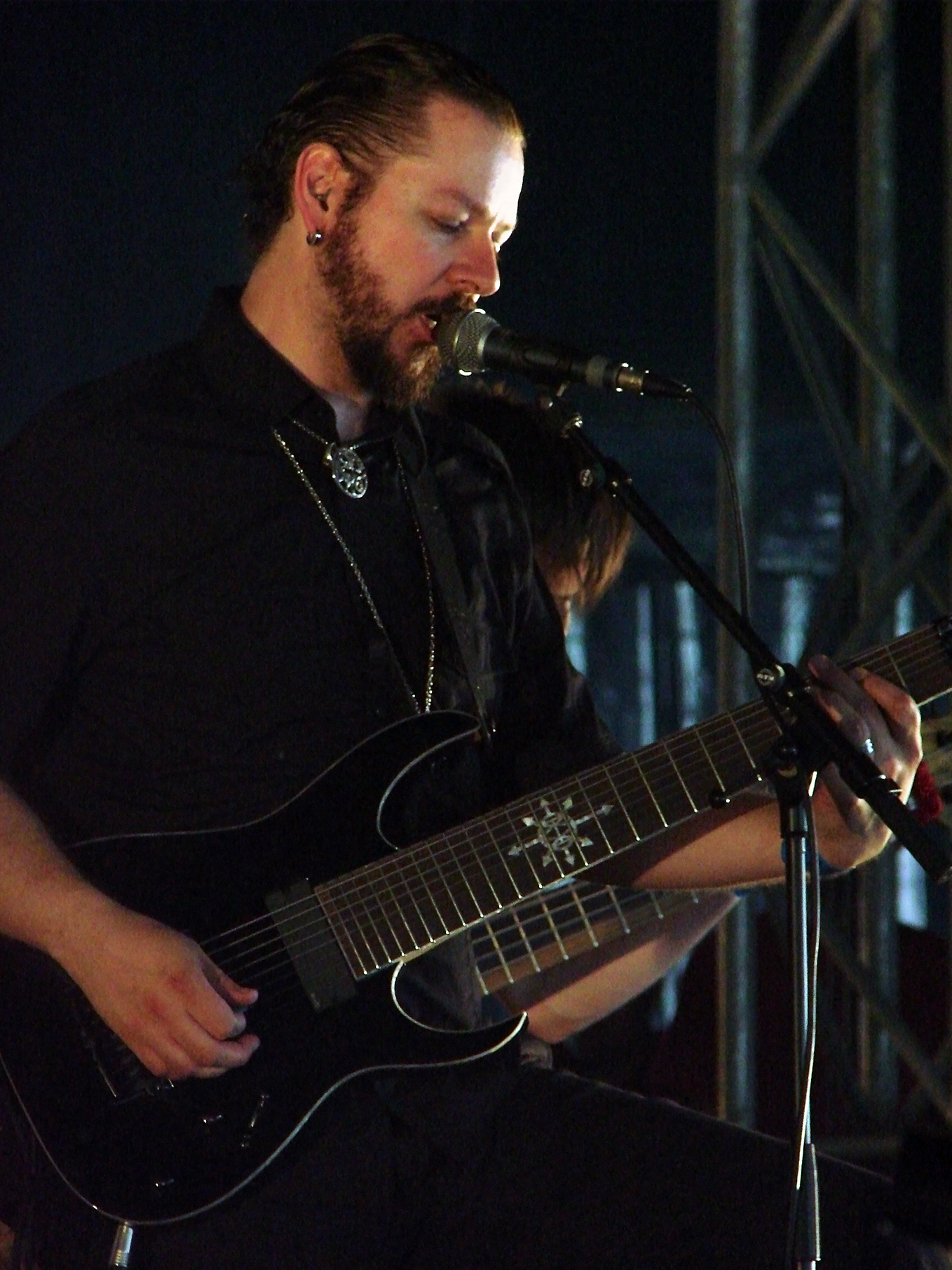
Norwegian musician Ihsahn wrote "Snøfall" on Silence in the Snow.

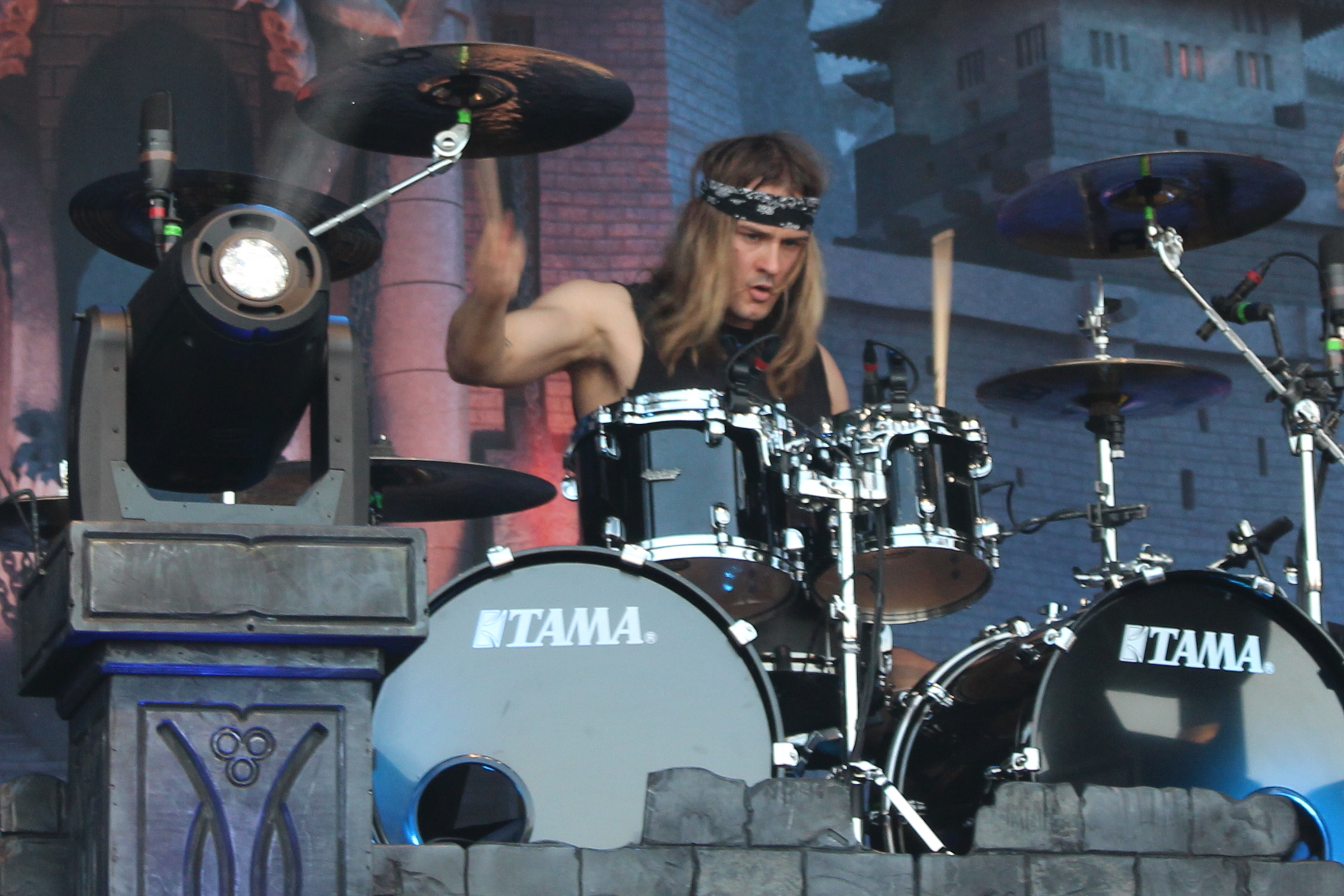
Paul Wandtke replaced Madiro in late 2015 and remained for a year.

Key
†	Indicates song released as a single or promotional single
‡	Indicates song credited as being written by the full band

Song	Credited writer(s)	Release	Year	Ref.	Notes
"Amongst the Shadows & the Stones" †	Matt Heafy; Corey Beaulieu; Paolo Gregoletto	What the Dead Men Say	2020		
"And Sadness Will Sear"	Matt Heafy; Corey Beaulieu; Paolo Gregoletto; Travis Smith; Jason Suecof ‡	The Crusade	2006		
"Anthem (We Are the Fire)" †	Matt Heafy; Corey Beaulieu; Paolo Gregoletto; Travis Smith; Jason Suecof ‡	The Crusade	2006		
"As I Am Exploding"	Matt Heafy; Corey Beaulieu; Paolo Gregoletto; David Draiman	Vengeance Falls	2013		(Note: "As I Am Exploding", "No Hope for the Human Race" and "Skulls... We Are 138" were released as bonus tracks on the deluxe and Japanese editions of Vengeance Falls only.)
"Ascendancy"	Matt Heafy	Ascendancy	2005		
"Ashes"	Matt Heafy; Travis Smith	Ember to Inferno	2003		
"At the End of This War"	Matt Heafy; Corey Beaulieu; Paolo Gregoletto; David Draiman	Vengeance Falls	2013		
"Beauty in the Sorrow"	Matt Heafy; Corey Beaulieu; Paolo Gregoletto	The Sin and the Sentence	2017		
"Becoming the Dragon" †	Matt Heafy; Corey Beaulieu; Paolo Gregoletto; Travis Smith; Jason Suecof ‡	The Crusade	2006		
"Bending the Arc to Fear"	Matt Heafy; Corey Beaulieu; Paolo Gregoletto	What the Dead Men Say	2020		
"Beneath the Sun"	Matt Heafy; Corey Beaulieu; Paolo Gregoletto; Michael Baskette	Silence in the Snow	2015		(Note: "Beneath the Sun" is also known as "Beneath the Sun (Fade Away)".)
"Betrayer" †	Matt Heafy; Corey Beaulieu; Paolo Gregoletto	The Sin and the Sentence	2017		
"Beyond Oblivion"	Matt Heafy; Corey Beaulieu; Paolo Gregoletto	The Sin and the Sentence	2017		
"Black" †	Matt Heafy; Corey Beaulieu; Paolo Gregoletto	In Waves	2011		
"Bleed Into Me" †	Matt Heafy; Corey Beaulieu; Paolo Gregoletto	What the Dead Men Say	2020		
"Blind Leading the Blind" †	Matt Heafy; Corey Beaulieu; Paolo Gregoletto; Michael Baskette	Silence in the Snow	2015		
"Blinding Tears Will Break the Skies" †	Matt Heafy	Non-album single	2005		(Note: "Blinding Tears Will Break the Skies" and "Washing Away Me in the Tides" were also released as bonus tracks on the deluxe edition of Ascendancy.) (Note: Demo versions of "Blinding Tears Will Break the Skies", "Like Light to the Flies" and "The Deceived" were originally released on the EP Flavus in 2004.)
"Brave This Storm" †	Matt Heafy; Corey Beaulieu; Paolo Gregoletto; David Draiman	Vengeance Falls	2013		
"Breathe in the Flames"	Matt Heafy; Corey Beaulieu; Paolo Gregoletto; Michael Baskette	Silence in the Snow	2015		
"Broken One"	Matt Heafy; Corey Beaulieu; Paolo Gregoletto; Travis Smith; Jason Suecof ‡	"Anthem (We Are the Fire)"	2006		(Note: "Broken One" was also released as a bonus track on the Japanese edition of The Crusade.)
"Built to Fall" †	Matt Heafy; Corey Beaulieu; Paolo Gregoletto	In Waves	2011		
"The Calamity"	Matt Heafy; Corey Beaulieu; Paolo Gregoletto; Travis Smith ‡	Shogun	2008		
"Capsizing the Sea"	Matt Heafy; Corey Beaulieu; Paolo Gregoletto	In Waves	2011		
"Catastrophist" †	Matt Heafy; Corey Beaulieu; Paolo Gregoletto	What the Dead Men Say	2020		
"Caustic Are the Ties That Bind"	Matt Heafy; Corey Beaulieu; Paolo Gregoletto	In Waves	2011		
"Cease All Your Fire"	Matt Heafy; Corey Beaulieu; Paolo Gregoletto; Michael Baskette	Silence in the Snow	2015		(Note: "Cease All Your Fire" and "The Darkness of My Mind" were released as bonus tracks on the deluxe and Japanese editions of Silence in the Snow only.)
"Chaos Reigns"	Matt Heafy; Corey Beaulieu; Paolo Gregoletto	In Waves	2011		
"Contempt Breeds Contamination"	Matt Heafy; Corey Beaulieu; Paolo Gregoletto; Travis Smith; Jason Suecof ‡	The Crusade	2006		
"Coração Não Tem Idade (Vou Beijar)" †	António Ferrão	Non-album single	2019		(Note: "Coração Não Tem Idade (Vou Beijar)" features, and was originally recorded by, Toy (António Ferrão).)
"A Crisis of Revelation"	Matt Heafy; Corey Beaulieu; Paolo Gregoletto	In the Court of the Dragon	2021		
"The Crusade"	Matt Heafy; Corey Beaulieu; Paolo Gregoletto; Travis Smith ‡	The Crusade	2006		
"The Darkness of My Mind"	Matt Heafy; Corey Beaulieu; Paolo Gregoletto; Michael Baskette	Silence in the Snow	2015		
"Dead and Gone" †	Matt Heafy; Corey Beaulieu; Paolo Gregoletto; Michael Baskette	Silence in the Snow	2015		
"The Deceived"	Matt Heafy; Corey Beaulieu	Ascendancy	2005		
"Declaration"	Matt Heafy	Ascendancy	2005		
"The Defiant"	Matt Heafy; Corey Beaulieu; Paolo Gregoletto	What the Dead Men Say	2020		
"Demon"	Matt Heafy	Caeruleus	2003		
"Departure"	Matt Heafy; Jason Suecof	Ascendancy	2005		
"Detonation" †	Matt Heafy; Corey Beaulieu; Paolo Gregoletto; Travis Smith; Jason Suecof ‡	The Crusade	2006		
"Down from the Sky" †	Matt Heafy; Corey Beaulieu; Paolo Gregoletto; Travis Smith ‡	Shogun	2008		
"Drowned and Torn Asunder"	Matt Heafy; Corey Beaulieu	Ascendancy	2005		
"Drowning in Slow Motion"	Matt Heafy; Corey Beaulieu; Paolo Gregoletto	In Waves	2011		(Note: "Drowning in Slow Motion", "Ensnare the Sun", "A Grey So Dark" and "Slave New World", originally recorded by Sepultura, were released as bonus tracks on the deluxe edition of In Waves only.)
"Drowning in the Sound" †	Matt Heafy; Corey Beaulieu; Paolo Gregoletto	Non-album single	2019		
"Dusk Dismantled"	Matt Heafy; Corey Beaulieu; Paolo Gregoletto	In Waves	2011		
"Dying in Your Arms" †	Matt Heafy; Jason Suecof	Ascendancy	2005		
"Ember to Inferno"	Matt Heafy; Travis Smith	Ember to Inferno	2003		
"The End of Everything"	Matt Heafy; Jason Suecof	Ascendancy	2005		
"Endless Night"	Matt Heafy; Corey Beaulieu; Paolo Gregoletto	The Sin and the Sentence	2017		
"Ensnare the Sun"	Matt Heafy; Corey Beaulieu; Paolo Gregoletto	In Waves	2011		
"Entrance of the Conflagration" †	Matt Heafy; Corey Beaulieu; Paolo Gregoletto; Travis Smith; Jason Suecof ‡	The Crusade	2006		
"Fall Into Your Hands"	Matt Heafy; Corey Beaulieu; Paolo Gregoletto	In the Court of the Dragon	2021		
"Falling to Grey"	Matt Heafy; Travis Smith	Ember to Inferno	2003		
"Feast of Fire" †	Matt Heafy; Corey Beaulieu; Paolo Gregoletto	In the Court of the Dragon	2021		
"For the Greater Good of God"	Steve Harris	Maiden Heaven 2: An All-Star; Tribute to Iron Maiden	2016		(Note: "For the Greater Good of God" and "Iron Maiden" were originally recorded by Iron Maiden.)
"Forsake Not the Dream"	Matt Heafy; Corey Beaulieu; Paolo Gregoletto	In Waves	2011		
"From Dawn to Decadence"	Matt Heafy; Corey Beaulieu; Paolo Gregoletto	In the Court of the Dragon	2021		
"Fugue (A Revelation)"	Matt Heafy; Travis Smith	Ember to Inferno	2003		(Note: "Fugue (A Revelation)", "My Hatred", "Requiem" and "To Burn the Eye" were originally released on the Caeruleus demo.)
"The Ghost That's Haunting You"	Matt Heafy; Corey Beaulieu; Paolo Gregoletto; Michael Baskette	Silence in the Snow	2015		
"A Grey So Dark"	Matt Heafy; Corey Beaulieu; Paolo Gregoletto	In Waves	2011		
"A Gunshot to the Head of Trepidation" †	Matt Heafy; Corey Beaulieu; Travis Smith; Jason Suecof	Ascendancy	2005		
"He Who Spawned the Furies"	Matt Heafy; Corey Beaulieu; Paolo Gregoletto; Travis Smith ‡	Shogun	2008		
"The Heart from Your Hate" †	Matt Heafy; Corey Beaulieu; Paolo Gregoletto	The Sin and the Sentence	2017		
"I Don't Wanna Be Me" †	Peter Steele	Non-album single	2019		(Note: "I Don't Wanna Be Me" was originally recorded by Type O Negative.)
"If I Could Collapse the Masses"	Matt Heafy; Travis Smith	Ember to Inferno	2003		
"Ignition"	Matt Heafy; Corey Beaulieu; Paolo Gregoletto; Travis Smith; Jason Suecof ‡	The Crusade	2006		
"Implore the Darken Sky" †	Maik Weichert; Marcus Bischoff; Patrick Schleitzer; Eric Bischoff; Matthias Voigt; Patrick W. Engel	Non-album single	2023		(Note: "Implore the Darken Sky" was originally recorded by Heaven Shall Burn.)
"In the Court of the Dragon" †	Matt Heafy; Corey Beaulieu; Paolo Gregoletto	In the Court of the Dragon	2021		
"In Waves" †	Matt Heafy; Corey Beaulieu; Paolo Gregoletto	In Waves	2011		
"Inception of the End"	Matt Heafy; Corey Beaulieu; Paolo Gregoletto	In Waves	2011		
"Inception: The Bleeding Skies"	Matt Heafy; Travis Smith	Ember to Inferno	2003		
"Incineration: The Broken World"	Matt Heafy; Corey Beaulieu; Paolo Gregoletto; David Draiman	Vengeance Falls	2013		
"Insurrection"	Matt Heafy; Corey Beaulieu; Paolo Gregoletto; Travis Smith ‡	Shogun	2008		
"Into the Mouth of Hell We March" †	Matt Heafy; Corey Beaulieu; Paolo Gregoletto; Travis Smith ‡	Shogun	2008		
"Iron Maiden"	Steve Harris	Maiden Heaven: A Tribute to Iron Maiden	2008		(Note: "Iron Maiden" was also released as a bonus track on the Japanese edition of Shogun.)
"IX"	Matt Heafy; Corey Beaulieu; Paolo Gregoletto	What the Dead Men Say	2020		
"Kill the Poor" †	Jello Biafra; Ray Pepperell	Non-album single	2019		(Note: "Kill the Poor" was originally recorded by Dead Kennedys.)
"Kirisute Gomen" †	Matt Heafy; Corey Beaulieu; Paolo Gregoletto; Travis Smith ‡	Shogun	2008		
"Lake of Fire" †	Matt Heafy	Ruber	2001		
"Leaving This World Behind"	Matt Heafy; Corey Beaulieu; Paolo Gregoletto	In Waves	2011		
"Like a Sword Over Damocles"	Matt Heafy; Corey Beaulieu; Paolo Gregoletto	In the Court of the Dragon	2021		
"Like Callisto to a Star in Heaven"	Matt Heafy; Corey Beaulieu; Paolo Gregoletto; Travis Smith ‡	Shogun	2008		
"Like Light to the Flies" †	Matt Heafy; Corey Beaulieu; Jason Suecof	Ascendancy	2005		
"Losing My Religion" †	Michael Stipe; Peter Buck; Mike Mills; Bill Berry	Vengeance Falls	2013		(Note: "Losing My Religion", originally recorded by R.E.M., was released as a bonus track on the Japanese edition of Vengeance Falls only.)
"Master of Puppets"	James Hetfield; Lars Ulrich; Cliff Burton; Kirk Hammett	Remastered: Metallica's; Master of Puppets Revisited	2006		(Note: "Master of Puppets" was originally recorded by Metallica.)
"My Hatred"	Matt Heafy; Travis Smith	Ember to Inferno	2003		
"No Hope for the Human Race"	Matt Heafy; Corey Beaulieu; Paolo Gregoletto; David Draiman	Vengeance Falls	2013		
"No Way Back Just Through" †	Matt Heafy; Corey Beaulieu; Paolo Gregoletto	In the Court of the Dragon	2021		
"No Way to Heal"	Matt Heafy; Corey Beaulieu; Paolo Gregoletto; David Draiman	Vengeance Falls	2013		
"Of All These Yesterdays"	Matt Heafy; Corey Beaulieu; Paolo Gregoletto	In Waves	2011		
"Of Prometheus and the Crucifix"	Matt Heafy; Corey Beaulieu; Paolo Gregoletto; Travis Smith ‡	Shogun	2008		
"The Ones We Leave Behind"	Matt Heafy; Corey Beaulieu; Paolo Gregoletto	What the Dead Men Say	2020		
"Other Worlds"	Matt Heafy; Corey Beaulieu; Paolo Gregoletto	The Sin and the Sentence	2017		
"Pain"	Matt Heafy	Ruber	2001		
"The Phalanx" †	Matt Heafy; Corey Beaulieu; Paolo Gregoletto	In the Court of the Dragon	2021		
"Pillars of Serpents" †	Matt Heafy; Travis Smith	Ember to Inferno	2003		
"Poison, the Knife or the Noose"	Matt Heafy; Corey Beaulieu; Paolo Gregoletto; Travis Smith ‡	Shogun	2008		(Note: "Poison, the Knife or the Noose" and "Upon the Shores" were released on the deluxe edition of Shogun only.)
"Pull Harder on the Strings of Your Martyr" †	Matt Heafy; Corey Beaulieu; Travis Smith; Jason Suecof	Ascendancy	2005		
"Pull Me from the Void"	Matt Heafy; Corey Beaulieu; Paolo Gregoletto; Michael Baskette	Silence in the Snow	2015		
"Rain"	Matt Heafy; Corey Beaulieu	Ascendancy	2005		
"Requiem"	Matt Heafy	Ember to Inferno	2003		
"The Revanchist"	Matt Heafy; Corey Beaulieu; Paolo Gregoletto	The Sin and the Sentence	2017		
"Rise Above the Tides"	Matt Heafy; Corey Beaulieu; Paolo Gregoletto; Michael Baskette	Silence in the Snow	2015		
"The Rising" †	Matt Heafy; Corey Beaulieu; Paolo Gregoletto; Travis Smith; Jason Suecof ‡	The Crusade	2006		
"Scattering the Ashes"	Matt Heafy; Corey Beaulieu; Paolo Gregoletto	What the Dead Men Say	2020		
"Sever the Hand"	Matt Heafy; Corey Beaulieu; Paolo Gregoletto	The Sin and the Sentence	2017		
"The Shadow of the Abbatoir"	Matt Heafy; Corey Beaulieu; Paolo Gregoletto	In the Court of the Dragon	2021		
"Shattering the Skies Above" †	Matt Heafy; Corey Beaulieu; Paolo Gregoletto	God of War: Blood & Metal	2010		(Note: "Shattering the Skies Above" was also released as a bonus track on the deluxe edition of In Waves.)
"Shogun"	Matt Heafy; Corey Beaulieu; Paolo Gregoletto; Travis Smith ‡	Shogun	2008		
"Sickness Unto You"	Matt Heafy; Corey Beaulieu; Paolo Gregoletto	What the Dead Men Say	2020		
"Silence in the Snow" †	Matt Heafy; Corey Beaulieu; Paolo Gregoletto; Michael Baskette	Silence in the Snow	2015		
"The Sin and the Sentence" †	Matt Heafy; Corey Beaulieu; Paolo Gregoletto	The Sin and the Sentence	2017		
"Skulls... We Are 138"	Glenn Danzig	Vengeance Falls	2013		(Note: "Skulls... We Are 138" is a medley of "Skulls" and "We Are 138", both of which were originally recorded by Misfits.)
"A Skyline's Severance"	Matt Heafy; Corey Beaulieu; Paolo Gregoletto	In Waves	2011		
"Slave New World"	Max Cavalera; Igor Cavalera; Andreas Kisser; Paulo Pinto Jr. Evan Seinfeld	In Waves	2011		
"Snøfall"	Vegard Sverre Tveitan	Silence in the Snow	2015		
"The Storm" †	Matt Heafy	Caeruleus	2003		(Note: "Sworn" and "The Storm" were also released as bonus tracks on the Japanese edition of Ember to Inferno.)
"Strife" †	Matt Heafy; Corey Beaulieu; Paolo Gregoletto; David Draiman	Vengeance Falls	2013		
"Suffocating Sight"	Matt Heafy	Ascendancy	2005		
"Sworn"	Matt Heafy	Caeruleus	2003		
"The Thing That's Killing Me"	Matt Heafy; Corey Beaulieu; Paolo Gregoletto; Michael Baskette	Silence in the Snow	2015		
"This World Can't Tear Us Apart"	Matt Heafy; Corey Beaulieu; Paolo Gregoletto; Travis Smith; Jason Suecof ‡	The Crusade	2006		
"Throes of Perdition" †	Matt Heafy; Corey Beaulieu; Paolo Gregoletto; Travis Smith ‡	Shogun	2008		
"Through Blood and Dirt and Bone"	Matt Heafy; Corey Beaulieu; Paolo Gregoletto; David Draiman	Vengeance Falls	2013		
"Thrown Into the Fire"	Matt Heafy; Corey Beaulieu; Paolo Gregoletto	The Sin and the Sentence	2017		
"Thrust"	Matt Heafy	Ruber	2001		
"To Believe"	Matt Heafy; Corey Beaulieu; Paolo Gregoletto; David Draiman	Vengeance Falls	2013		
"To Burn the Eye"	Matt Heafy; Travis Smith	Ember to Inferno	2003		
"To the Rats"	Matt Heafy; Corey Beaulieu; Paolo Gregoletto; Travis Smith; Jason Suecof ‡	The Crusade	2006		
"Torn Between Scylla and Charybdis"	Matt Heafy; Corey Beaulieu; Paolo Gregoletto; Travis Smith ‡	Shogun	2008		
"Tread the Floods"	Matt Heafy; Corey Beaulieu; Paolo Gregoletto; Travis Smith; Jason Suecof ‡	The Crusade	2006		
"Unrepentant"	Matt Heafy; Corey Beaulieu; Paolo Gregoletto; Travis Smith; Jason Suecof ‡	The Crusade	2006		
"Until the World Goes Cold" †	Matt Heafy; Corey Beaulieu; Paolo Gregoletto; Michael Baskette	Silence in the Snow	2015		
"Upon the Shores"	Matt Heafy; Corey Beaulieu; Paolo Gregoletto; Travis Smith ‡	Shogun	2008		
"Vengeance"	Matt Heafy; Corey Beaulieu; Paolo Gregoletto; Travis Smith; Jason Suecof ‡	"Anthem (We Are the Fire)"	2006		
"Vengeance Falls"	Matt Heafy; Corey Beaulieu; Paolo Gregoletto; David Draiman	Vengeance Falls	2013		
"A View of Burning Empires"	Matt Heafy; Travis Smith	Ember to Inferno	2003		
"Villainy Thrives" †	Matt Heafy; Corey Beaulieu; Paolo Gregoletto; David Draiman	Vengeance Falls	2013		
"Wake (The End Is Nigh)"	Matt Heafy; Corey Beaulieu; Paolo Gregoletto; David Draiman	Vengeance Falls	2013		
"Washing Away Me in the Tides"	Matt Heafy	"Blinding Tears Will Break the Skies"	2005		
"Watch the World Burn"	Matt Heafy; Corey Beaulieu; Paolo Gregoletto	In Waves	2011		
"What the Dead Men Say" †	Matt Heafy; Corey Beaulieu; Paolo Gregoletto	What the Dead Men Say	2020		
"When All Light Dies"	Matt Heafy; Travis Smith	Ember to Inferno	2003		
"The Wretchedness Inside"	Matt Heafy; Corey Beaulieu; Paolo Gregoletto	The Sin and the Sentence	2017		
"X"	Matt Heafy; Corey Beaulieu; Paolo Gregoletto	In the Court of the Dragon	2021		
