= The Heart from Your Hate =

2017 song by Trivium

Single by Trivium

from the album The Sin and the Sentence
- Released: August 24, 2017
- Studio: Hybrid Studios, Santa Ana, California
- Genre: Heavy metal
- Length: 4:04
- Label: Roadrunner
- Songwriters: Matt Heafy; Corey Beaulieu; Paolo Gregoletto; Alex Bent
- Producer: Josh Wilbur

Trivium singles chronology
"The Sin and the Sentence" (2017)	"The Heart from Your Hate" (2017)	"Betrayer" (2017)

"The Heart from Your Hate" is a song by American heavy metal band Trivium, appearing on the band's eighth studio album The Sin and the Sentence. The song premiered on Octane on August 23, 2017. The following day, August 24, the song was released as the second advanced single from the album.

== Music video ==
A music video was released for the song on the same day as the single's release. The video shows the band performing the song with a red filter over the video. The music video was directed by Jon Paul Douglass.

== Personnel ==
- Matt Heafy – lead vocals, rhythm guitar
- Corey Beaulieu – lead guitar
- Paolo Gregoletto – bass guitar, backing vocals
- Alex Bent – drums

== Charts ==
Chart performance for "The Heart from Your Hate"
Chart (2017)	Peak position
US Mainstream Rock (Billboard)	25
