= The Sin and the Sentence =

Studio album by Trivium
- Released: October 20, 2017
- Studios: Hybrid Studios, Santa Ana, California
- Genres: Thrash metal; heavy metal; metalcore
- Length: 57:15
- Label: Roadrunner
- Producer: Josh Wilbur

Trivium studio album chronology
Silence in the Snow (2015)	The Sin and the Sentence (2017)	What the Dead Men Say (2020)

Singles from The Sin and the Sentence
- 1. "The Sin and the Sentence" Released: August 1, 2017; 2. "The Heart from Your Hate" Released: August 24, 2017; 3. "Betrayer" Released: October 15, 2017; 4. "Endless Night" Released: April 9, 2018

The Sin and the Sentence is the eighth studio album by American heavy metal band Trivium. It was released on October 20, 2017, through Roadrunner Records and was produced by Josh Wilbur. The album is the first to feature drummer Alex Bent who replaced Paul Wandtke. This album marks the return of frontman Matt Heafy's screaming vocals which had been absent for a period due to Heafy suffering a vocal cord injury.

The album received critical acclaim, with the song "Betrayer" being nominated at 61st Annual Grammy Awards in 2019 for Best Metal Performance.

== Background and promotion ==
Following the release of Silence in the Snow, then-drummer Mat Madiro left the band. An established touring drummer Paul Wandtke took Madiro's place in Trivium. In January 2017, rumors began to circulate which suggested that Wandtke would be leaving the band and would be replaced by Alex Bent. After a short time, both parties would confirm Wandtke's departure from the band as well as Bent's involvement with them.

In late July 2017, the band began releasing teasers online with cryptic images, lyrical passages, and video clips, with the accompanying Roman numeral "VIII.I". This would later be confirmed as representing August 1, the release date for a new single, "The Sin and the Sentence", with both the song and accompanying music video featuring Bent on drums. A second series of online teasers by the band would come just a few weeks afterwards, utilizing similar cryptic video clips with accompanying lyrical passages. This led to the eventual release of a second single, titled "The Heart from Your Hate". The song was first premiered exclusively on Octane on August 23. The next day, the band released both the song and a music video worldwide, as well as the track listing and release date for their eighth album, titled The Sin and the Sentence, on which both singles would be featured.

The song "The Wretchedness Inside" is taken from a demo Heafy ghostwrote for a different band in 2014. The song was never used, so the band re-recorded the song which appeared on The Sin and the Sentence instead.

In an interview with hardDrive, Heafy stated that the working title for the album was "The Revanchist" and that the album was going to have gold and neon colors, but those plans were changed once Heafy's wife, Ashley, presented the band with symbols for each accompanying song. The band then decided to use that artwork instead.

== Composition ==
In an interview, bassist Paolo Gregoletto stated that new material is more 'extreme' and that the band would return to featuring screaming vocals on the new album. Speaking about the album at the Bandit Rock Q&A session, Paolo Gregoletto said that the album is "the perfect culmination of what we've been doing throughout the years", saying the band found a way to balance their heavy side with their melodic side. 7-string guitars are once again being used on The Sin and the Sentence, with the album being referred to as thrash metal, heavy metal, and metalcore, hearkening back to the sound of Ascendancy, Shogun, Silence in the Snow and In Waves. Paolo also goes on to say this album was not only one the band made for themselves as metal fans, but for loyal fans who have followed the band for years.

== Critical reception ==
Professional ratings
Review scores
Source	Rating
AllMusic	4/5 stars
Blabbermouth.net	8.5/10 stars
Exclaim!	8/10 stars
Loudwire	8.5/10 stars
Metal Hammer	4/5 stars
MetalSucks	4.5/5 stars
Ultimate Guitar	8.5/10 stars

The Sin and the Sentence received critical acclaim.

Metal Hammer awarded the album four out of five stars, saying the album is "the first to meld every previous release into a 'very best of Trivium'" and praised the band that "determined to absorb all of their past and better it, showing once and for all who they are and what Trivium are: quite simply one of the best bands in modern metal."

Loudwire gave the album a positive review, noting the album's variety in featuring heavy, aggressive songs and ambitious songs as well as more melodic and accessible tracks, concluding that "Their songwriting and musicianship are as strong as they have ever been, with The Sin and the Sentence delivering a quality listen from beginning to end."

Decibel also wrote an editorial in which they recommended that readers "Give the new Trivium album a chance" despite acknowledging that the band's style of metal might not align with many of their readers' preferences, and highlighted the song "Betrayer", writing "Heroic guitar harmonies! Screaming vocals! Clean-singing choruses that stay in your head for hours! This is what I look for in a Trivium song."

AllMusic wrote a positive review, noting that "the band has never sounded more confident, delivering a positively lethal 11-song set that strikes the perfect balance between unhinged and meticulously crafted." They also added that "the addition of Bent, a powerhouse, hammer-of-the-gods-style kit man, and the newfound conviction of vocalist Matt Heafy, seem to have put a charge into the group," and that "The riffage is meaner and leaner, and the songs themselves -- especially the singles 'Heart from Your Hate' and the combustible title track—feel both lived-in and visceral, with highlights arriving via the serpentine, gang-vocal-led 'Beyond Oblivion' and the throat-mangling closer 'Thrown Into the Fire'."

== Track listing ==
All tracks are written by Trivium.

No.	Title	Length
1.	"The Sin and the Sentence (Note: The digital version of the album cut out the intro of this song, making it a length of 5:49.)"	6:23
2.	"Beyond Oblivion"	5:16
3.	"Other Worlds"	4:49
4.	"The Heart from Your Hate"	4:03
5.	"Betrayer"	5:27
6.	"The Wretchedness Inside"	5:31
7.	"Endless Night"	3:38
8.	"Sever the Hand"	5:25
9.	"Beauty in the Sorrow"	4:31
10.	"The Revanchist"	7:17
11.	"Thrown Into the Fire"	5:29
Total length:		57:15

Japanese edition
No.	Title	Length
12.	"Pillars of Serpents (Note: Recorded in 2017 and initially released as a bonus track on the Japanese edition and, later on, as a single with the title "Pillars of Serpents (2019)" despite being the same audiotrack.)" (re-recorded from Ember to Inferno)	5:03
Total length:		62:18

== Personnel ==
Credits are adapted from the album's liner notes.

Trivium

- Matt Heafy – lead vocals, guitars
- Corey Beaulieu – guitars, backing vocals
- Paolo Gregoletto – bass, backing vocals
- Alex Bent – drums, percussion

Additional musicians

- Too Late the Hero – gang vocals (track 10)
- Josh Wilbur, Jon Paul Douglass, Thomas Oliveira, Mike Miller, Josh Brooks, Gerardo Carrero, Jonathan Carrion, Kevin Martincowski, Daniel Rodriguez, Brandon Diaz, Elijah Rojas – gang vocals

Production

- Josh Wilbur – producer, engineering, mixing, mastering
- Nick Rowe – engineering
- Kevin Billingslea – engineering (track 10)
- Ashley Heafy – cover art, layout, design
- Jon Paul Douglass – art direction, photography

== Charts ==
Chart (2017)	Peak position
Australian Albums (ARIA)	4
Austrian Albums (Ö3 Austria)	10
Belgian Albums (Ultratop Flanders)	34
Belgian Albums (Ultratop Wallonia)	41
Canadian Albums (Billboard)	11
Finnish Albums (Suomen virallinen lista)	9
French Albums (SNEP)	71
German Albums (Offizielle Top 100)	12
Hungarian Albums (MAHASZ)	28
Irish Albums (IRMA)	35
Italian Albums (FIMI)	84
New Zealand Albums (RMNZ)	33
Portuguese Albums (AFP)	32
Scottish Albums (Official Charts)	12
Spanish Albums (PROMUSICAE)	43
Swiss Albums (Schweizer Hitparade)	21
UK Albums (Official Charts)	18
UK Rock & Metal Albums (Official Charts)	1
US Billboard 200	23
US Top Hard Rock Albums (Billboard)	1
US Top Rock Albums (Billboard)	3
