= Ember to Inferno =

Studio album by Trivium
- Released: October 14, 2003
- Recorded: June–July 2003
- Studios: Audiohammer Studios, Sanford, Florida
- Genres: Metalcore; melodic death metal; thrash metal
- Length: 49:32
- Label: Lifeforce
- Producers: Jason Suecof; Trivium

Trivium studio album chronology
Ember to Inferno (2003)	Ascendancy (2005)

Alternative cover
- Ab Initio cover

Ember to Inferno is the debut studio album by American heavy metal band Trivium. It was released on October 14, 2003, through Lifeforce Records and was produced by Jason Suecof and the band themselves.

== Background ==
Trivium formed in 1999 with the band's first lineup consisting of guitarist Jarred Bonaparte, vocalist/bassist Brad Lewter, and drummer Travis Smith. Matt Heafy would join the band in 2000 as lead guitarist but would also take over lead vocal duties after Lewter's departure. The band would experience more lineup changes before recording its first demo, Ruber ("The Red Demo"), in 2001 with the lineup of Heafy on vocals and guitar, Brent Young on bass and backing vocals, and Smith on drums. George Moore would temporarily join the band as a second guitarist. In 2002, the band started to record its second demo, Caeruleus ("The Blue Demo"). Released in early 2003, the demo would find its way to German record label Lifeforce Records who would sign Trivium. The band would then enter the studio to record its debut studio album with producer Jason Suecof.

== Overview ==
This album is the only full-length release by the band with former bassist Brent Young. Frontman Matt Heafy was 17 years old when the album was written and recorded.

Corey Beaulieu toured in support of the album, but did not play on the album according to the re-release booklet. Beaulieu would not join the band until after recording of Ember to Inferno had concluded.

The 2004 reissue of the album includes early versions of "The Deceived" and "Blinding Tears Will Break the Skies". Both songs were re-recorded for Ascendancy, with the latter appearing only on the 2006 special edition. "Demon" is taken from the Trivium EP.

"Inception: The Bleeding Skies" is "A View of Burning Empires" played in reverse.

On December 2, 2014, it was announced by Matt Heafy on Twitter that Ember to Inferno would be re-released again with new artwork along with the band's early demo EPs. The re-release was officially revealed on October 14, 2016, via Trivium's Facebook page. It was released on December 2, 2016, two years after the initial announcement by Heafy. The re-release is dubbed Ab Initio, Latin for "From the Beginning".

"Pillars of Serpents" was re-recorded by Trivium for their 2017 album The Sin and the Sentence. Titled "Pillars of Serpents '17", it was included as a bonus track exclusively on the Japanese edition of the album. The re-recording was widely released to services such as YouTube, Spotify and iTunes on March 22, 2019 under the title of "Pillars of Serpents (2019)".

In 2024, the title track "Ember to Inferno" was re-recorded and used as part of the promotional campaign by Bogren Digital for Trivium Drums and Trivium Ampknob plugins.

== Musical style ==
Ember to Inferno has been generally described as metalcore, melodic death metal, thrash metal, alternative metal, power metal, "fantasy metal" and progressive metal.

Professional ratings
Review scores
Source	Rating
AllMusic	2.5/5 stars
Sputnikmusic	2/5 stars
LouderSound	3.5/5 stars

== Track listing ==
All tracks are written by Matt Heafy. All musical arrangement by Heafy and Travis Smith.

No.	Title	Length
1.	"Inception: The Bleeding Skies" (instrumental)	0:35
2.	"Pillars of Serpents"	4:35
3.	"If I Could Collapse the Masses"	4:41
4.	"Fugue (A Revelation)"	4:21
5.	"Requiem"	4:53
6.	"Ember to Inferno"	4:11
7.	"Ashes" (instrumental)	0:53
8.	"To Burn the Eye"	7:01
9.	"Falling to Grey"	5:36
10.	"My Hatred"	4:34
11.	"When All Light Dies"	6:23
12.	"A View of Burning Empires" (instrumental)	1:48
Total length:		49:32

Japanese edition
No.	Title	Length
13.	"The Storm" (from Caeruleus – The Blue Demo)	6:05
14.	"Sworn" (from Caeruleus – The Blue Demo)	4:29
Total length:		60:06

2004 reissue bonus tracks
No.	Title	Length
13.	"Blinding Tears Will Break the Skies" (from Flavus – The Yellow Demo)	5:41
14.	"The Deceived" (from Flavus – The Yellow Demo)	6:00
15.	"Demon" (from Caeruleus – The Blue Demo)	3:27
Total length:		64:40

Ab Initio
No.	Title	Length
1.	"Pain"	7:18
2.	"Thrust"	5:38
3.	"Lake of Fire"	6:14
4.	"To Burn the Eye"	6:59
5.	"Requiem"	5:01
6.	"Fugue"	4:29
7.	"My Hatred"	4:51
8.	"The Storm"	6:03
9.	"Sworn"	4:27
10.	"Demon"	3:29
11.	"Like Light to the Flies" (Heafy, Corey Beaulieu)	5:37
12.	"Blinding Tears Will Break the Skies"	5:42
13.	"The Deceived" (Heafy, Beaulieu)	5:48

Notes

- Tracks 1 to 3 are from Ruber (The Red Demo).
- Tracks 4 to 10 are from Caeruleus (The Blue Demo).
- Tracks 11 to 13 are from Flavus (The Yellow Demo).

== Personnel ==
Trivium

- Matt Heafy – lead vocals, guitars
- Brent Young – bass, backing vocals
- Travis Smith – drums, percussion
- Corey Beaulieu – guitars on Flavus (The Yellow Demo)

Additional musicians

- Jason Suecof – keyboards on "Inception: The Bleeding Skies" and "A View of Burning Empires", lead guitar on "Ember to Inferno" and "To Burn the Eye", choir vocals on "When All Light Dies"
- Alex Vieira – lead guitar on "When All Light Dies"
- galamity (credited as George Moore) – acoustic guitar on "A View of Burning Empires"
- Icky – acoustic guitar

Production

- Jason Suecof – producer, mixing, engineer
- Matt Heafy – producer
- Travis Smith – producer
- Brent Young – producer
- Tom Morris – mastering
- Christophe Szpajdel – logo (2016 re-issue)

== Charts ==
Chart (2016)	Peak position
Australian Albums (ARIA)	85
UK Rock Album Chart	15
