= Shogun (Trivium album) =

Studio album by Trivium
- Released: September 23, 2008
- Studios: Sound Kitchen, Nashville, Tennessee
- Genres: Thrash metal; progressive metal; metalcore
- Length: 66:37; 79:55 (special edition)
- Label: Roadrunner
- Producer: Nick Raskulinecz

Trivium studio album chronology
The Crusade (2006)	Shogun (2008)	In Waves (2011)

Singles from Shogun
- 1. "Kirisute Gomen" Released: July 31, 2008; 2. "Into the Mouth of Hell We March" Released: August 9, 2008; 3. "Down from the Sky" Released: September 1, 2008; 4. "Throes of Perdition" Released: January 27, 2009

Alternative cover
- Special edition

Shogun (将軍, Shōgun) is the fourth studio album by American heavy metal band Trivium. The album was released worldwide on various dates between September 23, 2008, and October 1, 2008, through Roadrunner Records. It is their last release to feature original drummer Travis Smith. Work on the album is noted to have begun with producer Nick Raskulinecz in October 2007, with the band stating that they chose not to work with Jason Suecof again as they wanted to explore new ideas.

It was cited as the band's best album by Bryan Rolli of Loudwire in 2025.

== Background ==
In an interview with Metal Injection, Matt Heafy stated:

We started demoing after Family Values, like October... We started writing some songs, demoing them. The demo quality is so good it sounds like a real album, which is awesome, so it gives us a really good basis to compare and fix shit, so we've been revising and going back in and changing shit up. We're doing another set of demos. I think we're probably going to have 30 songs to pick from and we're working with Nick Raskulinecz (who produced for Foo Fighters, Rush, Velvet Revolver, Shadows Fall and Stone Sour).

In an interview with Revolver, Corey Beaulieu stated:

We want to capture the best ingredients of everything we've done. Each song has a little bit of everything, going between something heavy and then melodic, and then back to something heavy. So it has a really interesting balance. On The Crusade, Matt did almost all singing, so this time we're bringing back some of the screaming that's on Ascendancy.

== Composition ==
=== Influences, style and themes ===
The reason we picked that word is because when you think of a word like shogun, it sparks all this vivid imagery and storytelling, especially when you look into the definition. It's the highest ranking military general in Japanese times. We really dug it. We felt it was an appropriate name for the album.

— Matt Heafy, About.com

Shogun largely features a continuation of the band playing thrash metal, metalcore, and progressive metal, the latter exhibited by technical instrumentation and longer song lengths. It sees a prominent return of Matt Heafy's screaming vocals, which were a rare occurrence on The Crusade. The album is also the band's first album produced by Nick Raskulinecz. In an interview for About.com, Heafy described the album's musical direction as a combination of various aspects including: "the past, present, and future of Trivium, all on one CD" and that is the "next evolutionary step". When asked about the change in his singing style, he said: "It's the kind of thing that happened naturally."

Heafy had known of the term shogun and, learning more while visiting Japan, wanted to use it as a title around the time The Crusade was being released. Heafy brought it up again while writing the new album, feeling it encapsulated the album's sound. He cited Japanese, Greek, and Judeo-Christian themes as inspirations, such as the first song being named after kiri-sute gomen. While songs share themes, the album is not a concept album, and the songs use the themes to "further the lyrics even more" rather than directly retelling the stories.

== Release and promotion ==
On June 16, 2008, Trivium posted a bulletin on their MySpace profile titled "New Album Update" with an embedded YouTube video, implying that the album would be released on September 30, 2008, by Roadrunner. On July 31, the first track from the new album, "Kirisute Gomen", was made available as a free digital download through the Roadrunner Records website for 24 hours only. On August 8, the cover art for the album was revealed. On August 12, the fourth track from the new album, "Into the Mouth of Hell We March", was made available for purchase on iTunes. On September 1, the third track from the album "Down from the Sky" was made available for purchase on iTunes, as well as in stores. On September 2, the music video for "Down from the Sky" was released (exclusively) on MySpace. The band would later upload "Throes of Perdition" to their MySpace page on September 17 and on September 23 the complete album was added.

== Critical reception ==
Professional ratings
Aggregate scores
Source	Rating
Metacritic	66/100
Review scores
Source	Rating
About.com	4/5 stars
AllMusic	3.5/5 stars
IGN	8.2/10 stars
Rock Sound	8/10 stars
Ultimate-Guitar.com	9.3/10 stars
MetalSucks	4/5 stars
PopMatters	6/10 stars
Sputnikmusic.com	3/5 stars

The album received mostly positive reviews, with Chad Bowar of About.com praising the band's progress on songwriting, as well as their musicianship. Bowar finishing its review stating: "Shogun won't silence Trivium's legions of critics, but I think most fans will like the harsh vocals along with the great riffs and memorable melodies." Eduardo Rivadavia of AllMusic described Shogun as "Trivium's most challenging and ambitious album yet." IGN's Ed Thompson wrote that with the release of their fourth full-length album the "band have done what absolutely needed to be done." The band's ideas and influences were praised by Thompson, and considered Shogun the best of their first four albums. Thompson also defined Shogun as the band's "best effort to date."

== Commercial performance ==
Since its release, Shogun has sold over 300,000 copies worldwide. In the United States in its first week of release sold 24,000 copies and debuted at number 23 on the Billboard 200 chart, and the top 100 in 18 other countries, including number 6 on the Japanese international charts, number 4 on the Canadian Hard Rock Charts, number 1 on the UK rock charts and number 4 on the Australian charts. As of March 2009, the album has sold around 70,000 copies in the United States since its late September release, according to Nielsen SoundScan.

== Track listing ==
All tracks are written by Trivium, except where noted.

Standard edition
No.	Title	Length
1.	"Kirisute Gomen"	6:27
2.	"Torn Between Scylla and Charybdis"	6:49
3.	"Down from the Sky"	5:34
4.	"Into the Mouth of Hell We March"	5:52
5.	"Throes of Perdition"	5:54
6.	"Insurrection"	4:57
7.	"The Calamity"	4:58
8.	"He Who Spawned the Furies"	4:07
9.	"Of Prometheus and the Crucifix"	4:40
10.	"Like Callisto to a Star in Heaven"	5:25
11.	"Shogun"	11:54
Total length:		66:37

Special edition bonus tracks
No.	Title	Length
12.	"Poison, the Knife or the Noose"	4:14
13.	"Upon the Shores"	5:21
14.	"Iron Maiden" (Iron Maiden cover)	3:43
Total length:		79:55

Special edition DVD

- The Making of Shogun (A behind-the-scenes documentary capturing the making of the album)
- Shogun: The Riffs (Instructional videos for guitar and bass)

Songs written for the album but recorded for later albums
No.	Title	Length
1.	"Silence in the Snow" (later recorded for Silence in the Snow)
2.	"The Phalanx" (later recorded for In the Court of the Dragon)

=== Notes ===
- "Into the Mouth of Hell We March" was featured on the soundtrack for the 2008 video game Madden NFL 09.
- "Down from the Sky" was featured on the WWE SmackDown! Vs Raw 2010 soundtrack.
- In the special edition of the album, the song "Shogun" fades out earlier, making it a length of 11:22.

== Personnel ==
Trivium

- Matt Heafy – lead vocals, guitars
- Corey Beaulieu – guitars, unclean backing vocals
- Paolo Gregoletto – bass, clean backing vocals, intro guitar on “Throes of Perdition”
- Travis Smith – drums, percussion

Production

- Nick Raskulinecz – producer
- Paul Fig – engineer
- Nick Raskulinecz – engineer
- Ben Terry – engineer
- Colin Richardson – mixing (1–11)
- Jeffrey Rose – mixing (12–14), mixing engineer
- Martin "Ginge" Ford – mixing engineer
- Matt Wiggins – assistant engineer
- Mark Lewis – pre-production engineer
- Ted Jensen – mastering

== Charts ==
Chart (2008)	Peak position
Australian Albums (ARIA)	4
Austrian Albums (Ö3 Austria)	30
Belgian Albums (Ultratop Flanders)	72
Canadian Albums (Billboard)	19
Dutch Albums (Album Top 100)	48
Finnish Albums (Suomen virallinen lista)	17
French Albums (SNEP)	75
German Albums (Offizielle Top 100)	27
Greek Albums Chart	39
Hungarian Albums Chart	26
Irish Albums (IRMA)	30
Italian Albums (FIMI)	55
Japanese Oricon Albums Chart	17
New Zealand Albums (RMNZ)	28
Norwegian Albums (VG-lista)	34
Scottish Albums (Official Charts)	18
Swiss Albums (Schweizer Hitparade)	42
UK Albums (Official Charts)	17
UK Rock & Metal Albums (Official Charts)	1
US Billboard 200	23

== Certifications ==
Region	Certification	Certified units/sales
United Kingdom (BPI)	Silver	60,000^{‡}
^{‡} Sales+streaming figures based on certification alone.
