= Travis Smith (musician) =

American drummer (born 1982)

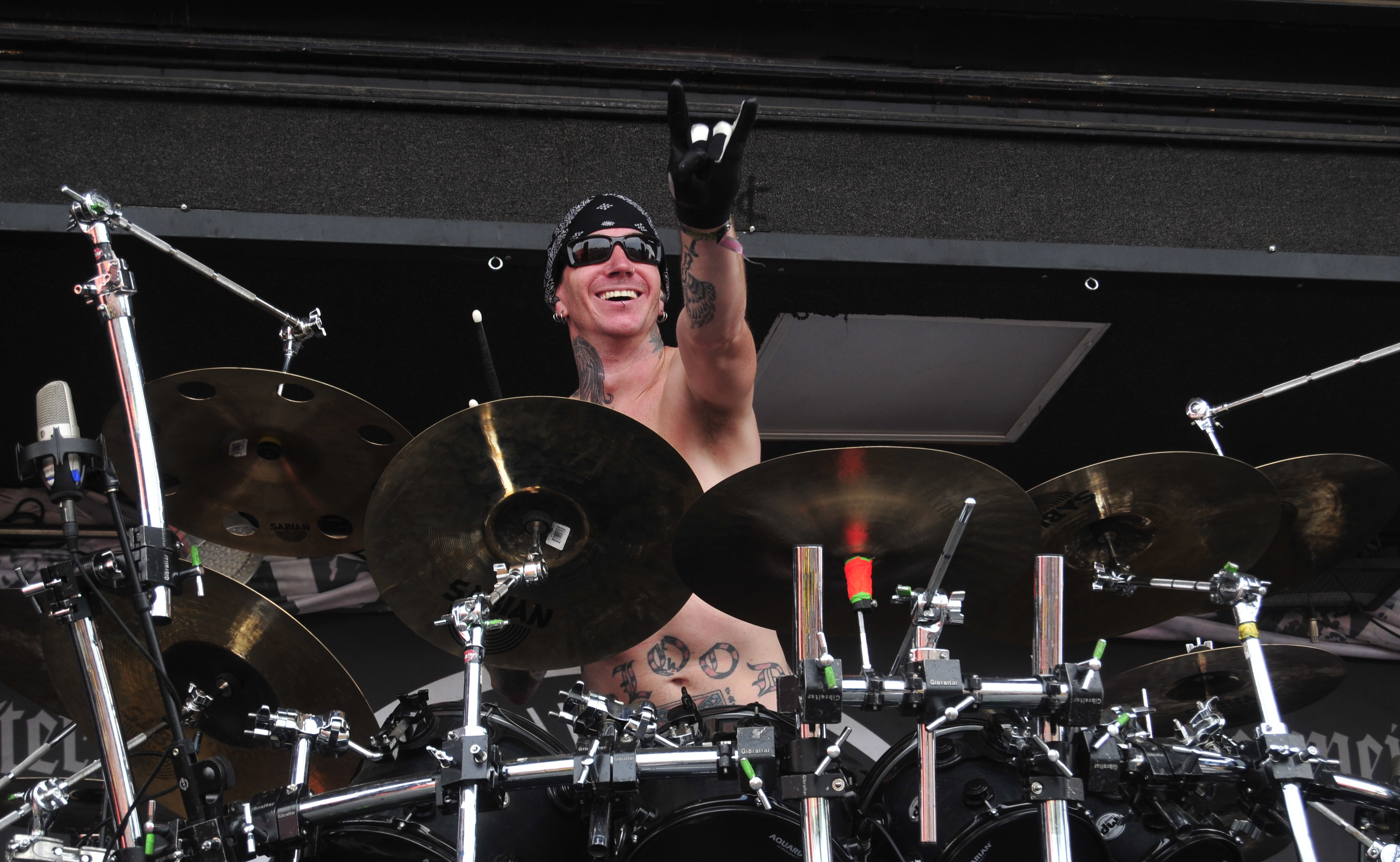
- Smith in 2009

Background information
- Born: April 29, 1982 (age 44); Bainbridge, Georgia, U.S.
- Genres: Metalcore; thrash metal; heavy metal
- Occupation: Musician
- Instruments: Drums; percussion
- Years active: 1999–present
- Label: Roadrunner
- Formerly of: Trivium

Travis Smith (born April 29, 1982) is an American musician best known as the original founder and former drummer of the heavy metal band Trivium, from their formation in 1999 until he officially departed on February 4, 2010. Smith is known for his very fast footwork and intricate rhythms on the toms, skills noted by music magazines such as Revolver and Modern Drummer as well as by other media. In Metal Hammer's Golden Gods Awards 2006, Travis received the "Best Drummer in the Universe" award.

== Departure from Trivium ==
Trivium's relationship with Smith had deteriorated over the years, and the band had no immediate plans to replace him when he announced in late October 2009 that he would be sitting out the 'Into the Mouth of Hell' tour to take care of "some personal business." It was not until after the band members started playing with Nick Augusto on the tour that they realized the addition served Trivium well.

"We were coming to the point where the band was -- not necessarily dissolving -- but dissolving in creativity and maybe in live fire and energy, so we had to make a change for the positive," Heafy told Noisecreep. "Thankfully, we were able to find Nick, who was able to step it up and really be that guy to take us to the next level. We told him over the phone [that we were continuing with Augusto,] and it was hard for everyone involved," Heafy said. "But I hope it's going to be something Travis recognizes was for the better for him in years to come. For his own health and well-being as well and for our own. I heard that he's doing very well now and that's the best you can wish for. And we hope he does amazingly, no matter what he picks in life to do next."

In an interview with OneMetal.com, lead guitarist Corey Beaulieu added, "...over time, things just kinda weren’t working out, and we did a headline tour of the US and about halfway through Travis just said he wasn’t going to do the next tour, so regardless we had to think about getting someone to fill in, then once we started playing with Nick we just knew it was the right thing."

On the nature of Smith's dismissal from the band, Beaulieu stated "...things were falling apart, and we just kind of pulled the trigger first, just to get it done, move forward and get the new guy settled in and comfortable. It’s been working really great with Nick and when people see the show they will see why."

== Eternal Exile ==
Early in 2012, Smith was asked to join Swedish band Eternal Exile. This was confirmed by a Facebook post by Smith: "It's official! I'm heading to Sweden to start pre-production with a killer band Eternal Exile, this will be their debut record. I fly in Feb. 1st and stay until Apr. 10th, It's going to be a hell of a killer 2 months of rockin' out Swedish style! Stay tuned for up dates and pics. I can't wait to get this show on the road!"

== BlackNova ==
In November 2017 it was announced that Travis Smith and former Trivium guitarist/bassist Brent Young formed a new band called BlackNova. Young died in 2020.
