= Corey Beaulieu =

American guitarist (born 1983)

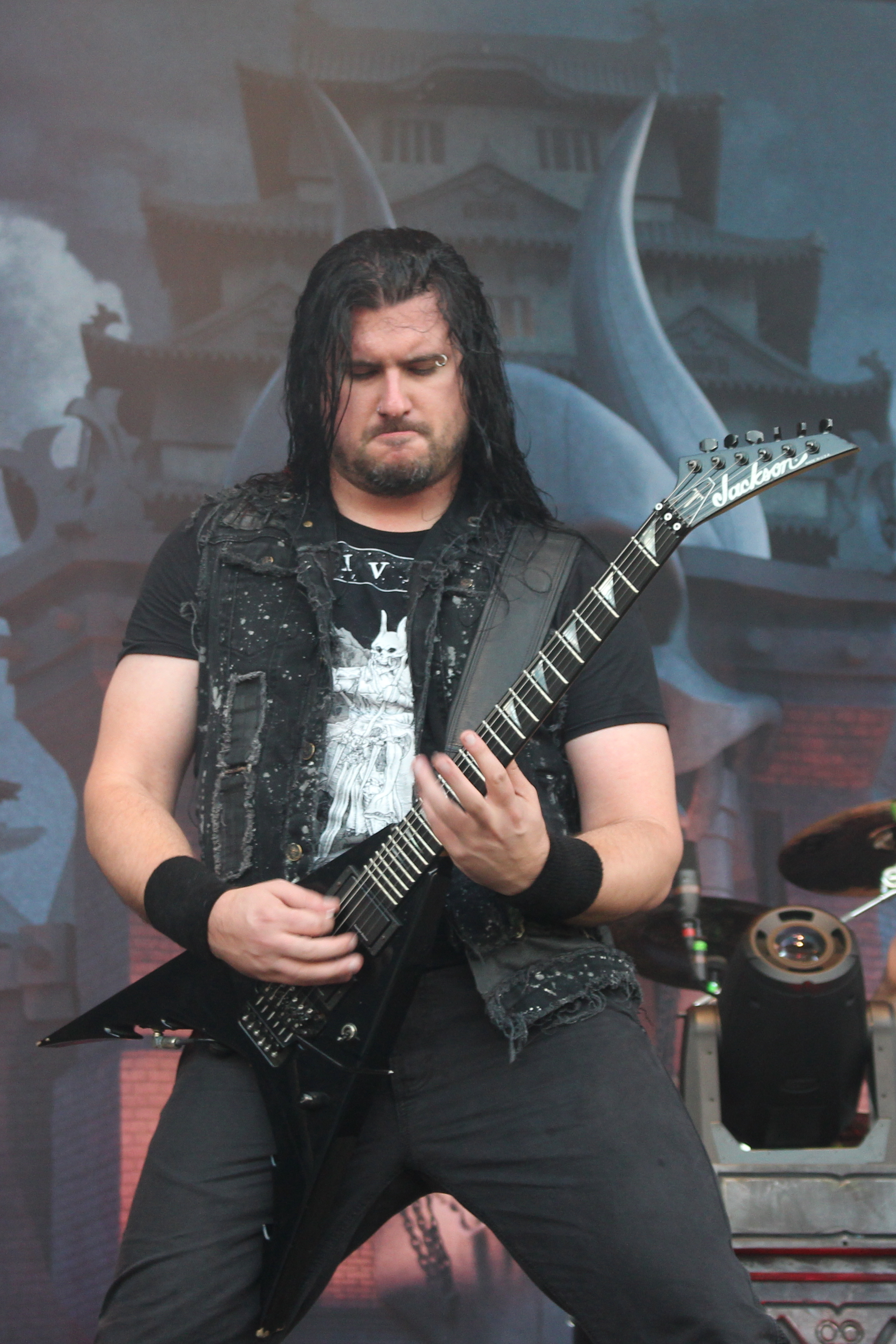
- Beaulieu performing in 2016

Background information
- Born: Corey King Beaulieu; November 22, 1983 (age 42); Dover-Foxcroft, Maine, U.S.
- Genres: Heavy metal; thrash metal; metalcore; progressive metal
- Occupation: Musician
- Instruments: Guitar; vocals
- Years active: 2003–present
- Member of: Trivium
- Website: trivium.org

Corey King Beaulieu (born November 22, 1983) is an American musician best known as the guitarist of the heavy metal band Trivium. At live shows, he also performs backing and, sometimes, lead screaming vocals.

== Early life ==
Born in Dover-Foxcroft, Maine, Beaulieu is the second of two siblings in the Beaulieu family. His older sister Sandra, lives in Maine and works with horses. He is of French-Canadian descent. He attended high school at Foxcroft Academy and played ice hockey. He graduated at Full Sail University in 2003.

== Career ==
Beaulieu began to play guitar at the age of 14, studying under Bill Pierce at Mark's Music in Brewer, Maine. He said that Guns N' Roses first piqued his interest in rock music, but his main influence to become a musician was after hearing Metallica.

He was asked to join Trivium when he tried out for the band, after the release of their first album Ember to Inferno in 2003. He performed backing vocals for Taking Dawn in 2010. Later, in 2011, Beaulieu performed guest vocals on Maine metal band Rebirth To End's song "The Weakness Randomization."

== Equipment ==
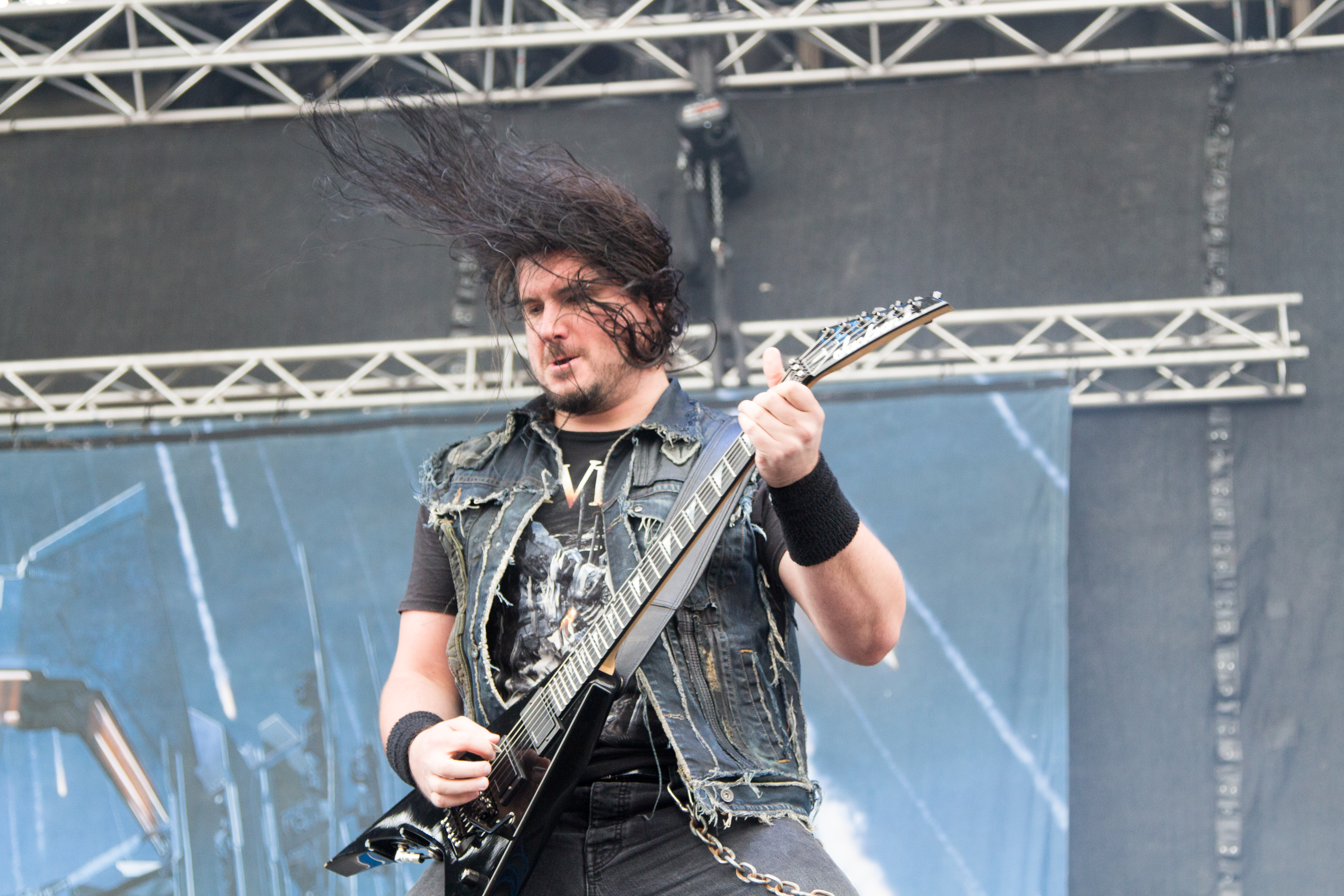
Beaulieu performing at Nova Rock Festival 2014

In the past Beaulieu used mainly Jackson guitars such as the Jackson KV-2 Black Ghost Flames finish (as seen in Roadrunner United bonus DVD) and DX10D series occasionally using a B.C Rich Warlock and a Blue Ibanez guitar, until Rita Haney, partner of 20 years to Dimebag Darrell gave him and Matt Heafy each one of Dimebag's signature Dean guitars in the same year, later spawning a three-year-long endorsement with Dean Guitars, with Beaulieu sporting a black 7 string Razorback V with silver bevels. He also had a signature model V. This V is metallic red with the Trivium circle logo placed between the bridge and neck pickups and is also fitted with a Floyd Rose Locking Tremolo and a Seymour Duncan Dimebucker.

He left Dean guitars in the summer of 2009, and later signed with Jackson Guitars. He has recently been seen playing various custom Jackson V guitars and is in talks with Jackson regarding the development of a signature guitar. At the 2013 Winter NAMM Show, Jackson officially released Beaulieu's Signature Guitar, available in 6- and 7-string variants, all made in the US.

== Discography ==
=== Trivium ===
- Ascendancy (2005)
- The Crusade (2006)
- Shogun (2008)
- In Waves (2011)
- Vengeance Falls (2013)
- Silence in the Snow (2015)
- The Sin and the Sentence (2017)
- What the Dead Men Say (2020)
- In the Court of the Dragon (2021)

=== Guest appearances ===
- Roadrunner United – "In the Fire" – The All-Star Sessions (2005)
- Annihilator – "Kicked" – Metal (2007)
- Recorded Melody Guitars and Guitar Solos on Lizzy Borden's 2007 studio album, Appointment with Death on the track "Abnormal".
- Dirge Within - Complacency (guest guitar solo)
- Rebirth To Ends - The Weakness Randomization (unclean vocals).
