= Crown in the Grave =

Studio album by Trivium
- Released: November 20, 2026
- Recorded: 2026
- Studios: The Hangar, Orlando, Florida
- Genres: Metalcore; thrash metal; heavy metal
- Length: 48:05
- Label: Roadrunner
- Producer: Josh Wilbur

Trivium chronology
Struck Dead (2025)	Crown in the Grave (2026)

Trivium studio album chronology
In the Court of the Dragon (2021)	Crown in the Grave (2026)

Singles from Crown in the Grave
- 1. "Dead Inside of Me" Released: September 16, 2026; 2. "Crown in the Grave" Released: October 8, 2026; 3. "The Terror" Released: November 20, 2026

Professional ratings
Review scores
Source	Rating
Blabbermouth.net	8.5/10
Kerrang!	4/5
Louder Sound	4/5 stars

Crown in the Grave is the eleventh studio album by American heavy metal band Trivium. It was released on November 20, 2026, through Roadrunner Records and was produced by Josh Wilbur. This is the band's first studio album in five years and the first to feature drummer Alex Rüdinger, who joined the band a year prior.

== Background and promotion ==
In 2025, Trivium embarked on a tour to celebrate the 20th anniversary of their 2005 album Ascendancy, and released the EP Struck Dead. Taling about the direction for their new album following the EP, frontman Matt Heafy explained, "originally we thought that was gonna lead to the [new full-length] record, and with all the circumstances that went around that, the world tour that changed, things like that, that actually helped us a lot. So with that, that actually did us a big favor, 'cause we were thinking those three songs were gonna tell us what the next record was gonna be. And as we had some time now, [we were], like, 'You know what? Maybe this isn't where we wanna be.' So the next record is absolutely nothing like the EP whatsoever. It's nothing like the EP at all." Less than a month before Struck Dead was released, drummer Alex Bent left the band and was later replaced by Alex Rüdinger. Heafy stated about the addition of Rüdinger, "we tried to get him in the band before Silence in the Snow in 2015. So, that was a whole 10 years ago. I don't want to do this again – we don't ever want to have another line-up switch. So the intention was, 'Let’s meet this guy that is our favourite drummer in the world', and we clicked instantly. That’s not diminishing anything or anyone that's happened in between, but that was the plan. And now that the plan has finally gotten corrected, things are going very well."

On September 16, 2026, the band officially released the first single from their then-upcoming album, "Dead Inside of Me", along with its music video. Bassist Paolo Gregoletto has stated that the single was "inspired by the Japanese concept of honne and tatemae – the tension between your true inner feelings and the mask you present to the outside world to hide them." The second single and title track, "Crown in the Grave", was released on September 18, along with a corresponding music video. At the same time, the band announced the album itself, the album cover, the track list, and release date. On November 20, the day the album was released, the band unveiled the third single "The Terror" along with an accompanying music video. The album's release includes special vinyl variants from Metal Injection and Louder Sound.

== Touring ==
Trivium has embarked on a North American tour to promote the album, scheduled to last through November and December 2026, co-headlined by In Flames and supported by Orbit Culture, Fit for an Autopsy, and Frozen Soul. Trivium and In Flames will also co-headline a European tour from March to May 2027, supported by Paleface Swiss and Vola.

== Track listing ==
All tracks are written by Trivium.

Crown in the Grave track listing
No.	Title	Length
1.	"Jorōgumo" (instrumental)	1:27
2.	"Crown in the Grave"	4:56
3.	"Dead Inside of Me"	4:01
4.	"The Terror"	4:42
5.	"The Haunting Never Ends"	3:07
6.	"Lie of It All"	4:11
7.	"Blackout the Dawn"	4:24
8.	"Paradise of Sinners"	3:12
9.	"Death Throes"	4:36
10.	"The Agony"	4:07
11.	"Devour Your Dreams"	3:37
12.	"Serpent in the Flame"	5:45
Total length:		48:05

Limited edition bonus track
No.	Title	Length
13.	"Blood on the Throne"	3:30
Total length:		51:35

== Personnel ==
Trivium

- Matt Heafy – lead vocals, guitars
- Corey Beaulieu – guitars, backing vocals
- Paolo Gregoletto – bass, backing vocals
- Alex Rüdinger – drums, percussion

Additional personnel

- Josh Wilbur – production, recording
- Jacob Hansen – mixing, mastering
- Kyle McAulay – engineering
- Anup Sastry – editing
