= Alex Rüdinger =

American drummer (born 1991)

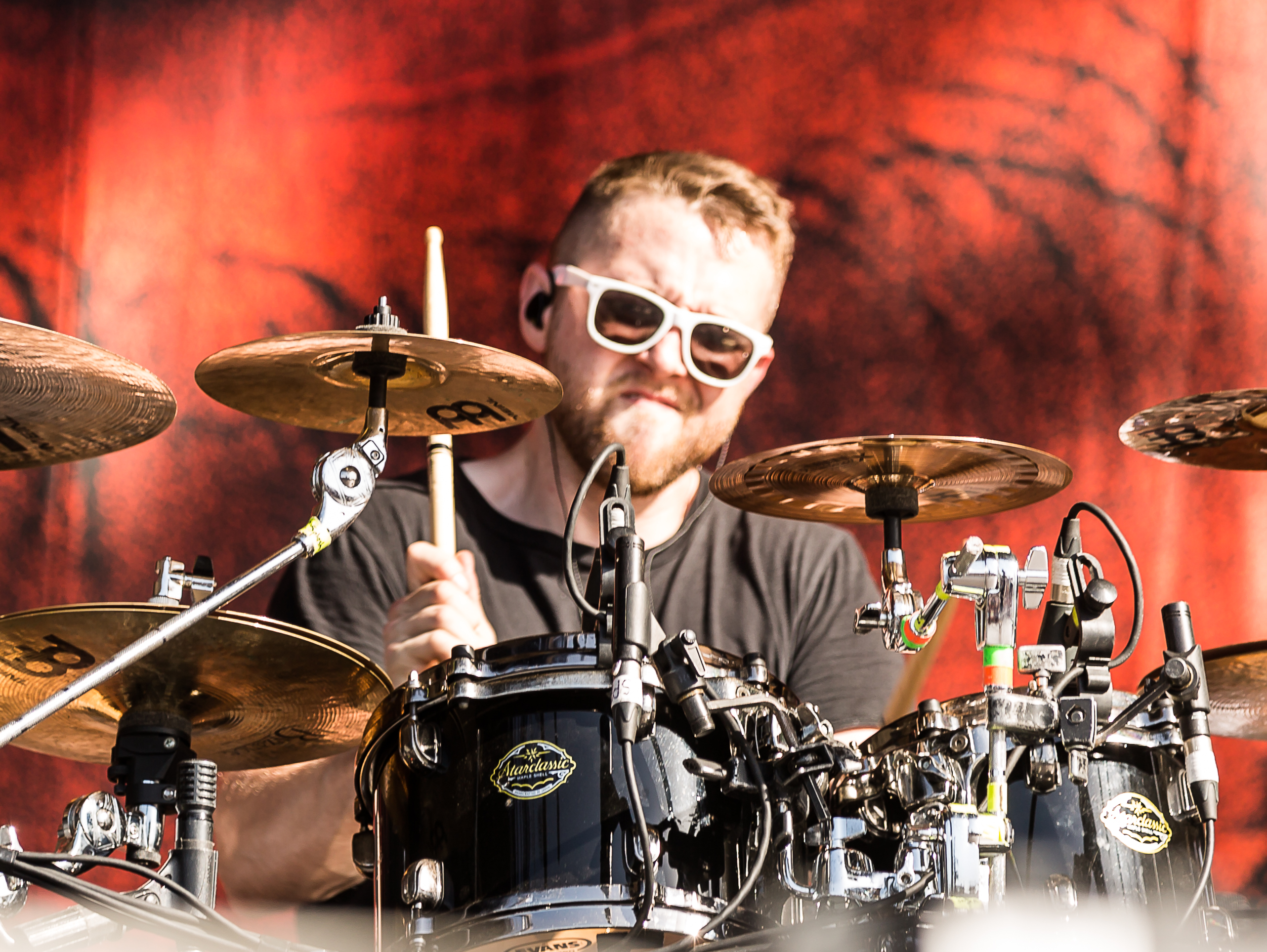
- Rüdinger live with Whitechapel at Full Force 2019

Background information
- Born: November 18, 1991 (age 35); Frederick, Maryland, U.S.
- Genres: Heavy metal; thrash metal; groove metal; technical death metal; progressive metal; metalcore; deathcore
- Occupation: Musician
- Instruments: Drums; percussion
- Years active: 2004–present
- Member of: Trivium; Light the Torch; Conquering Dystopia; Ordinance
- Formerly of: Good Tiger; The Faceless; The HAARP Machine; Threat Signal
- Website: alexrudinger.com

Alex Rüdinger (born November 18, 1991) is an American musician who has been the drummer of heavy metal band Trivium since October 2025. He is also a member of the bands Ordinance, Conquering Dystopia, and Light the Torch. Rüdinger is also a former drummer for Good Tiger, The Faceless, The HAARP Machine and Threat Signal.

Rüdinger performed, either as a session or touring member for metal bands such as 7 Horns 7 Eyes, Revocation, Cognizance, Monuments, Evan Brewer, Whitechapel, Nonvector, and Intronaut.

== Early life ==
Rüdinger was born November 18, 1991, in Frederick, Maryland. He began playing drums at the age of 13 and he launched his YouTube channel in 2006, which features his drumming videos and work.

== Career ==
=== Ordinance (2009–present) ===
Since 2009, Rüdinger has been a member of progressive death metal band Ordinance, playing drums on the albums Internal Monologues in 2011 and The Ides of March in 2016.

=== Threat Signal (2010–2012) ===
In 2010, Rüdinger became the drummer for Threat Signal, playing drums on their self-titled album Threat Signal in 2011. In April 2012, Alex Rüdinger left the band;

=== The HAARP Machine (2012–2013) ===
Rüdinger was a member of The HAARP Machine from 2012 to 2013.

=== The Faceless (2013–2014) ===
In January 2013, Rüdinger joined The Faceless as their new drummer, replacing Lyle Cooper. On October 20, 2014, Rüdinger announced that he was leaving the band to pursue other projects.

=== Conquering Dystopia (2013–present) ===
In 2013, Rüdinger became the drummer for Conquering Dystopia. He appeared on their debut and self-titled album Conquering Dystopia in 2014.

=== Good Tiger (2015–2018) ===
In 2015, Rüdinger formed the British rock supergroup Good Tiger with guitarists Derya "Dez" Nagle and Joaquin Ardiles (formerly of The Safety Fire), vocalist Elliot Coleman (formerly of Tesseract), and bassist Morgan Sinclair. He appeared on their albums A Head Full of Moonlight in 2015 and We Will All Be Gone in 2018.

=== Light the Torch (2021–present) ===
In 2021, Rüdinger joined Light the Torch, playing drums on their album You Will Be the Death of Me in 2021.

=== Trivium (2025–present) ===
On October 24, 2025, Rüdinger joined Trivium as their drummer, replacing Alex Bent.

== Gear ==
Rüdinger uses and endorses Tama drums and hardware, Meinl cymbals, Evans drumheads, Meinl drumsticks, ACD Unlimited pedals, 1964 Ears in-ear monitors, 2box electronics, Gator cases and Vratim drum shoes.

== Discography ==
=== Ordinance ===
- Internal Monologues (2011)
- The Ides of March (2016)

=== Threat Signal ===
- Threat Signal (2011)

=== Cognizance ===
- Inquisition (2013)
- Inceptum (2014)

=== Conquering Dystopia ===
- Conquering Dystopia (2014)

=== Good Tiger ===
- A Head Full of Moonlight (2015)
- We Will All Be Gone (2018)

=== Intronaut ===
- Fluid Existential Inversions (2020)

=== Merrow ===
- The Nasum EP (2020)

=== Whitechapel ===
- Kin (2021)

=== Nonvector ===
- Ashen Time (2024)

=== Trivium ===
- Crown in the Grave (2026)
