= In the Court of the Dragon =

Studio album by Trivium
- Released: October 8, 2021
- Recorded: May 2020–June 2021
- Studios: Full Sail University, Winter Park, Florida
- Genres: Thrash metal; progressive metal; metalcore; heavy metal
- Length: 52:11
- Label: Roadrunner
- Producer: Josh Wilbur

Trivium chronology
What the Dead Men Say (2020)	In the Court of the Dragon (2021)	Struck Dead (2025)

Trivium studio album chronology
What the Dead Men Say (2020)	In the Court of the Dragon (2021)	Crown in the Grave (2026)

Singles from In the Court of the Dragon
- 1. "In the Court of the Dragon" Released: July 9, 2021; 2. "Feast of Fire" Released: August 12, 2021; 3. "The Phalanx" Released: October 1, 2021

In the Court of the Dragon is the tenth studio album by American heavy metal band Trivium. It was released on October 8, 2021, through Roadrunner Records and was produced by Josh Wilbur. This is the band's last studio album to feature drummer Alex Bent, who parted ways with the band in early October 2025.

== Background and promotion ==
In June 2020, guitarist Corey Beaulieu revealed the band is already working on the follow-up to What the Dead Men Say while being in COVID-19 pandemic quarantine, saying the material they've been working on sounds "really pissed-off."

On July 7, 2021, the band teased that they are planning to release new music on Friday, July 9, with a 2-minute video trailer hinting at some potentially new music. On that day, the band officially released the new single and title track "In the Court of the Dragon" along with its music video. On August 10, the band started posting more cryptic images and videos pertaining to another new single on their social media pages. The second single, "Feast of Fire", was released on August 12 along with a corresponding music video. At the same time, the band announced the album itself, the album cover, the track list, and release date.

On August 19, a collaboration between Trivium and Bethesda Game Studios has been announced that will include The Elder Scrolls Online-themed music video. On October 1, one week before the album release, the band unveiled the third single "The Phalanx" along with an accompanying music video. The single is the album's final track and a re-recording of a scrapped song from the Shogun sessions. A music video for "The Shadow of the Abattoir" was released on November 17, 2022.

== Composition ==
=== Style and themes ===
The genre of the album has been described primarily as thrash metal, progressive metal, metalcore, and heavy metal. The album's artwork is a painting by Mathieu Nozieres. Regarding the artwork, Heafy relayed, "While the music of In the Court of the Dragon was taking shape, we knew we needed epic artwork of the type that you might see on the wall of an important museum from a long-dead renaissance master."

Lyrical content of the album is based on mythology inspired by fantasy literature. Instead of focusing on existing mythologies, the band decided to explore and create its own mythology within Trivium.

== Reception ==
=== Critical reception ===
Professional ratings
Review scores
Source	Rating
AllMusic	4/5 stars
Blabbermouth.net	8.5/10
Distorted Sound	10/10
Kerrang!	4/5 stars
Louder Sound	4.5/5 stars
Metal Injection	9/10
New Noise	4/5 stars
Rock 'N' Load	9/10
Rock Sins	8.5/10
Wall of Sound	10/10

The album received critical acclaim from critics. AllMusic gave the album a positive review saying, "As a whole, In the Court of the Dragon stands with Trivium's best work. It offers a classic meld of melodic thrash/metalcore and tech death in a sound as enormous as it is ambitious and diverse, making for wonderfully produced, flawlessly composed songs. All killer, no filler." Dom Lawson from Blabbermouth.net gave the album 8.5 out of 10 and said: "Having stayed the course, TRIVIUM are justifiably brimming with confidence on In the Court of the Dragon. The speed with which this record was put together, irrespective of circumstance, points to a laudable, collective drive to keep creating." Dan McHugh of Distorted Sound scored the album 10 out of 10 and said: "At this stage in their career TRIVIUM have nothing left to prove and have sat proudly amongst the elite for multiple decades, yet they still come out firing on all cylinders and have crafted material that offers something new and refreshing. In the Court of the Dragon is as bold and creative as it is fearlessly experimental. They have managed to push their boundaries without neglecting the core elements which have made them one of the most revered bands on the planet and in turn, have created one of the strongest albums, if not the pinnacle of their career to date." Kerrang! gave the album 4 out of 5 and stated: "Taken together, this makes for one of 2021's most compelling pure metal releases, and gives its makers reason to feel proud of their craft. Ably demonstrating that they have only grown stronger over the course of their 22-year career, it really would not be a surprise if they finally make the transition into arena-headlining status with In the Court of the Dragon. These are songs that are built to be played from the largest stages, and deserve to be."

Louder Sound gave the album a positive review, listed it as the 7th best metal album of 2021 and stated: "In terms of a band playing contemporary, modern heavy metal, Trivium have been the best for some time. They still are, and In the Court of the Dragon is a fucking awesome heavy metal album. Was it ever in doubt?" Metal Injection rated the album 9 out of 10 and stated, "In the Court of the Dragon presents a sound blown open so wide that it's almost impossible to guess at what might come next. Though with an album like this to listen to, who cares when that'll be?" New Noise gave the album 4 out of 5 and stated: "Fans of the band will be ecstatic with what they're hearing. This is a powerful and anthemic album, with each track building from the last. Trivium really brought it here, and to be honest, this might be my number one Metal album of the year." Rock 'N' Load praised the album saying, "In the Court of the Dragon is a gripping and totally engaging album that has everything that you could ever wish for not solely from a Trivium album, but a metal album and needs to be heard by any fan of the genre. Trust me, you just have to." Jamie Giberti of Rock Sins rated the album 8.5 out of 10 and said: "In the Court of the Dragon is the third act in the trilogy of The Sin and the Sentence and What the Dead Men Say. An excellent continual evolution, rather than revolution, and one that should see Trivium continue to ascend to the heights of the last few years and beyond." Wall of Sound gave the album a perfect score 10/10 and saying: "Trivium is now just Trivium, and In the Court of the Dragon is another release that defines what that means– they are one of the best metal bands on the planet." Loudwire called it one of the best metal albums of 2021.

=== Accolades ===
Publication	Accolade	Rank
Kerrang!	The 50 Best Albums of 2021	13
Loudwire	The 45 Best Rock + Metal Albums of 2021	11
Loudwire	The 35 Best Metal Songs of 2021 ("In the Court of the Dragon")	16

== Track listing ==
All tracks are written by Trivium, except "X" by Ihsahn.

In the Court of the Dragon track listing
No.	Title	Length
1.	"X" (instrumental)	1:27
2.	"In the Court of the Dragon"	5:09
3.	"Like a Sword Over Damocles"	5:30
4.	"Feast of Fire"	4:18
5.	"A Crisis of Revelation"	5:35
6.	"The Shadow of the Abattoir"	7:11
7.	"No Way Back Just Through"	3:53
8.	"Fall Into Your Hands"	7:45
9.	"From Dawn to Decadence"	4:08
10.	"The Phalanx"	7:15
Total length:		52:11

Japanese edition bonus tracks
No.	Title	Length
11.	"Beyond Oblivion" (live)	5:21
12.	"Amongst the Shadows & the Stones" (live)	5:39
Total length:		63:11

== Personnel ==
Credits adapted from AllMusic and the album's liner notes.

Trivium

- Matt Heafy – lead vocals, guitars
- Corey Beaulieu – guitars, backing vocals
- Paolo Gregoletto – bass, backing vocals
- Alex Bent – drums, percussion

Additional personnel

- Josh Wilbur – production, engineering, mixing
- Ihsahn – programming, arranging, instrumentation, orchestration, composition (track 1)
- Paul Suarez – mixing assistance
- Ted Jensen – mastering
- Ashley Heafy – art direction, design, layout
- Trivium – art direction
- Mathieu Nozieres – artwork
- Ryan Mackfall and Tom Griffiths – photography
- Mike Dunn – band photo

== Charts ==
Chart performance for In the Court of the Dragon
Chart (2021)	Peak position
Australian Albums (ARIA)	9
Austrian Albums (Ö3 Austria)	7
Belgian Albums (Ultratop Flanders)	49
Belgian Albums (Ultratop Wallonia)	52
Finnish Albums (Suomen virallinen lista)	11
French Albums (SNEP)	94
German Albums (Offizielle Top 100)	7
Hungarian Albums (MAHASZ)	14
Irish Albums (IRMA)	69
Japan Hot Albums (Billboard Japan)	46
Japanese Albums (Oricon)	41
Portuguese Albums (AFP)	16
Scottish Albums (Official Charts)	5
Spanish Albums (PROMUSICAE)	73
Swiss Albums (Schweizer Hitparade)	4
UK Albums (Official Charts)	20
UK Rock & Metal Albums (Official Charts)	1
US Billboard 200	71
US Top Hard Rock Albums (Billboard)	3
US Top Rock Albums (Billboard)	8
