= Good Tiger =

British rock band

- Origin: London
- Genres: Progressive rock; post-hardcore; progressive metal
- Years active: 2015–present
- Label: Metal Blade
- Members: Elliot Coleman; Derya "Dez" Nagle; Morgan Sinclair
- Past members: Alex Rüdinger

Good Tiger is a British rock supergroup from London. Often described as swancore, the band plays a fusion of post-hardcore and progressive rock/metal.

The band was formed in 2015 by guitarists Derya "Dez" Nagle and Joaquin Ardiles formerly of The Safety Fire, vocalist Elliot Coleman formerly of Tesseract, drummer Alex Rüdinger formerly of The Faceless among other groups and bassist Morgan Sinclair.

They have released four full length albums, the most recent being The Most Negative Day of the Year in February 2026.

== Members ==
=== Current ===
- Elliot Coleman – vocals (2015–present)
- Derya "Dez" Nagle – guitar (2015–present)
- Joaquin Ardiles – guitar (2015–present)
- Morgan Sinclair – bass (2015–present)

=== Past ===
- Alex Rüdinger – drums (2015–2018)

== Discography ==
=== Studio albums ===
- A Head Full of Moonlight (2015)
- We Will All Be Gone (2018)
- Raised in a Doomsday Cult (2020)
- The Most Negative Day of the Year (2026)

=== EPs ===
- Redux (2019)
