= What the Dead Men Say (album) =

Studio album by Trivium
- Released: April 24, 2020
- Studio: Studio 606 West, Northridge, Los Angeles, California; Full Sail University, Winter Park, Florida
- Genre: Heavy metal; metalcore; thrash metal
- Length: 46:27
- Label: Roadrunner
- Producer: Josh Wilbur

Trivium studio album chronology
The Sin and the Sentence (2017)	What the Dead Men Say (2020)	In the Court of the Dragon (2021)

Singles from What the Dead Men Say
- 1. "Catastrophist" Released: February 27, 2020; 2. "What the Dead Men Say" Released: March 26, 2020; 3. "Amongst the Shadows & the Stones" Released: April 16, 2020; 4. "Bleed Into Me" Released: April 22, 2020

What the Dead Men Say is the ninth studio album by American heavy metal band Trivium. It was released on April 24, 2020, through Roadrunner Records and was produced by Josh Wilbur.

== Background and promotion ==
In February 2020, the band started posting cryptic images and videos pertaining to the album on their social media pages. On February 25, the band posted a video on their social media pages teasing their new single "Catastrophist", which was released on February 27. At the same time, the band announced the album itself, the album cover, the track list, and release date.

Trivium toured in support of the album as an opening act for Megadeth and Lamb of God on their summer 2020 tour called "The Metal Tour of the Year". In Flames were set to join the tour as support, but subsequently dropped off and were replaced by Hatebreed.

On March 9, the band previewed "IX" (pitched down a full step) and "Scattering the Ashes" (instrumental only) in a new "Spawn" trailer for Mortal Kombat 11. On March 26, the band released their second single and title track "What the Dead Men Say" and its corresponding music video.

On April 16, a week before the album release, the band released their third single "Amongst the Shadows & the Stones". On April 22, the band released the final single "Bleed Into Me" before the album release along with its visualizer video.

== Composition ==
=== Influences, style and themes ===
The genre of the album has been described primarily as heavy metal, metalcore, and thrash metal while exploring elements of other genres such as melodic metalcore, melodic death metal, and progressive metal. Speaking about the album's sound, the frontman Matt Heafy said that "We've found a really great place to exist in this world. We love melodic death metal, we love death and black metal, and we love hardcore. What the Dead Men Say is everything we do on one record."

Like The Sin and the Sentence, lyrical content on What the Dead Men Say was inspired by modern aspects of life. The album's title-track was inspired by Philip K. Dick's science fiction novella of the same name. "Catastrophist" deals with the theme of humanity in a crisis. "Amongst the Shadows & the Stones" is about the horrors of war. "Bleed Into Me" is about neglecting personal issues. "The Defiant" was inspired by R. Kelly's documentary and abuse-enabling. "Sickness Unto You" was written from Matt Heafy's perspective after having to put his dog down. "Scattering the Ashes" is about having to deal with unresolved issues. "Bending the Arc to Fear" talks about the surveillance aspect of modern society. The final track "The Ones We Leave Behind" is about "running over" people to succeed in life, and the song also gave a powerful message and a whole new meaning in the wake of the COVID-19 pandemic.

== Critical reception ==
Professional ratings
Aggregate scores
Source	Rating
Metacritic	84/100
Review scores
Source	Rating
AllMusic	4/5 stars
Distorted Sound	9/10
Kerrang!	4/5 stars
KillYourStereo	75/100
Metal Hammer	4.5/5 stars
Rock 'N' Load	10/10
Rock Sins	8.5/10
Wall of Sound	10/10

The album received critical acclaim from critics. At Metacritic, which assigns a normalised rating out of 100 to reviews from mainstream critics, the album has an average score of 84 out of 100 based on 4 reviews, indicating "universal acclaim". AllMusic gave the album a positive review saying, "While Trivium have always been stubborn about following their own way, What the Dead Men Say sounds like an intentional gift to longtime fans. Its consistency, diversity, energy, and songwriting prowess put the set on par with the band's very best work." Distorted Sound scored the album 9 out of 10 and said: "What the Dead Men Say does lack the immediate appeal of The Sin and the Sentence, but devoting time to the record opens up new levels of brilliance with every listen. TRIVIUM are already one of the biggest names in heavy music – if they continue the path of excellence they have established with The Sin and the Sentence and What the Dead Men Say it would come as no surprise to see them reach heights not seen since the 1980s." Kerrang! gave the album 4 out of 5 and stated: "After a false-start early on in their career to the redemption with Shogun, they've spent the intervening years in the wilderness, but now the Florida quartet have found solace in simply doing what they want, displaying an undying love for the genre and community that embraced them so readily as teenagers. It's not perfect (hello, 'Bending The Arc To Fear'), but for a band previously hindered by wearing their influences so blatantly on their sleeve, they have made it to their final form. They are Trivium, and long may it continue."

Megan Langley from KillYourStereo gave the album 75 out of 100 and said: "Since this was my first time properly listening to a Trivium album, I can't at all compare this new record to others in their discography – whether it's better or worse. Despite that, I still found this ninth record to be an enjoyable, impressive melodic metal romp. The band brings in so many strong performances, both vocally and instrumentally, throughout a lot of the heavy and energetic metal tunes that fill up the well-written graves of this new release. For the most part, I thought the songs on What the Dead Men Say were interesting to listen to, full of gusto, heart and riffs. And now I can't wait to dive into the rest of their discography!" Metal Hammer gave the album a positive review and stated: "The Sin and the Sentence got Trivium back on the horse. What the Dead Men Say has them winning again. One of metal's most beloved bands are on the form of their lives right now. It doesn't get much better than that." Rock 'N' Load praised the album saying, "Every song feels like Trivium is on track to take the top spot on festivals worldwide, with huge choruses and heavy riffs, aggressive drums and a thick bass tone, What the Dead Men Say has everything and genuinely gets better and better with every listen." Jamie Giberti of Rock Sins rated the album 8.5 out of 10 and said: "What the Dead Men Say is a fine addition to the Trivium arsenal, and if the last three years are anything to go by, this will be the album to propel them to their biggest successes so far." Wall of Sound gave the album a perfect score 10/10 and saying: "This is the album where Trivium further cements their place as one of the most important bands in modern metal."

Metal Hammer named it as the 8th-best metal album of 2020.

== Track listing ==
All tracks are written by Trivium.

What the Dead Men Say track listing
No.	Title	Length
1.	"IX" (instrumental)	1:58
2.	"What the Dead Men Say"	4:45
3.	"Catastrophist"	6:28
4.	"Amongst the Shadows & the Stones"	5:40
5.	"Bleed Into Me"	3:48
6.	"The Defiant"	4:29
7.	"Sickness Unto You"	6:14
8.	"Scattering the Ashes"	3:24
9.	"Bending the Arc to Fear"	4:45
10.	"The Ones We Leave Behind"	4:56
Total length:		46:27

Japanese bonus tracks
No.	Title	Length
11.	"Bleed Into Me" (acoustic)	3:45
12.	"Scattering the Ashes" (acoustic)	3:04
Total length:		53:16

=== Notes ===
- "Bleed Into Me" is featured the song in Simlish on the 2014 video game The Sims 4 as part of The Sims 4: Nifty Knitting stuff pack released in 2020. It can be heard through the Metal station on stereos.

== Personnel ==
Credits adapted from AllMusic and the album's liner notes.

Trivium

- Matt Heafy – lead vocals, guitars
- Corey Beaulieu – guitars, backing vocals
- Paolo Gregoletto – bass, backing vocals
- Alex Bent – drums, percussion

Additional personnel

- Josh Wilbur – engineering, mixing, recording, production
- Paul Suarez – mixing assistance
- Ted Jensen – mastering
- Darren Schneider – recording
- Trivium – art direction
- Ashley Heafy – art direction, design, layout
- Mike Dunn – photography

== Charts ==
Chart performance for What the Dead Men Say
Chart (2020)	Peak position
Australian Albums (ARIA)	5
Austrian Albums (Ö3 Austria)	4
Belgian Albums (Ultratop Flanders)	12
Belgian Albums (Ultratop Wallonia)	128
Canadian Albums (Billboard)	43
Czech Albums (ČNS IFPI)	64
Dutch Albums (Album Top 100)	46
Finnish Albums (Suomen virallinen lista)	10
French Albums (SNEP)	153
German Albums (Offizielle Top 100)	4
Hungarian Albums (MAHASZ)	8
Ireland (IRMA)	71
Polish Albums (ZPAV)	16
Portuguese Albums (AFP)	8
Scottish Albums (OCC)	4
Swiss Albums (Schweizer Hitparade)	10
UK Albums (OCC)	12
UK Rock & Metal Albums (OCC)	1
US Billboard 200	35
