= Conquering Dystopia =

American instrumental metal band

- Origin: United States
- Genres: Technical death metal, progressive metal, instrumental
- Years active: 2013−present
- Labels: Century Media Records
- Members: Jeff Loomis; Keith Merrow; Alex Webster; Alex Rüdinger
- Website: conqueringdystopia.com

Conquering Dystopia is an American instrumental technical death metal supergroup founded by solo guitarist Keith Merrow and guitarist Jeff Loomis.

== History ==
In early 2013 solo guitarist Keith Merrow announced via his Facebook page that he and former Nevermore guitarist Jeff Loomis would record an album together. In July 2013 Merrow and Loomis, now going by the name Conquering Dystopia, launched a crowdfunding campaign on Indiegogo in order to fund the recording of the album and also announced that the band's lineup would also feature Cannibal Corpse bassist Alex Webster and former The Faceless drummer Alex Rüdinger. The campaign goal of $15,000 was reached in less than 24 hours.

In December 2013 Conquering Dystopia recorded their self-titled album at the Audio Hammer Studios with producer Mark Lewis. On March 10, 2014, the band digitally released the album.

Conquering Dystopia embarked on a tour alongside Animals as Leaders and Chon during the spring and summer of 2014.

On July 8, 2014 Conquering Dystopia was made available on vinyl and released via Century Media Records.

== Members ==
- Jeff Loomis – guitar (2013–present)
- Keith Merrow – guitar (2013–present)
- Alex Webster – bass (2013–present)
- Alex Rüdinger – drums (2013–present)

== Discography ==
- Conquering Dystopia (2014)

== Personnel ==
- Keith Merrow – Producer, Engineer
- Mark Lewis – Engineer, Mixer, Mastering
- Chris Finster – Engineer
