= Cognizance (band) =

British death metal band

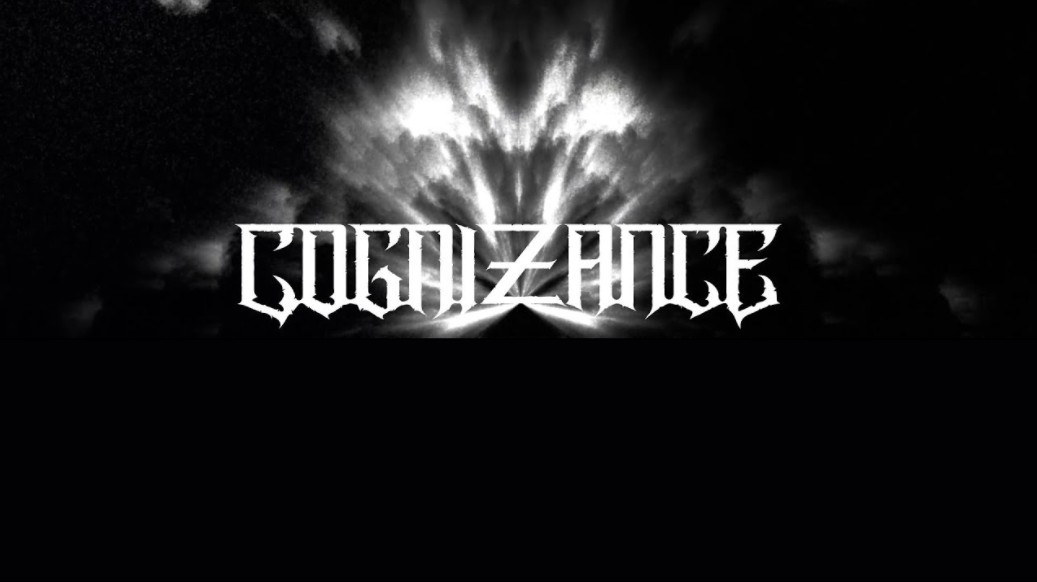

Background information
- Origin: Leeds, United Kingdom
- Genres: Technical death metal, Melodic death metal, Progressive metal
- Years active: 2012-present
- Labels: Prosthetic Records, Willowtip Records
- Members: Alex Baillie; Apostolis Karydis; Chris Binns; David Diepold
- Website: cognizance.bandcamp.com

Cognizance is a progressive Technical death metal band from Leeds, founded in 2012.

They released their debut album, Malignant Dominion, in September 2019 and their sophomore album, Upheaval, in September 2021 through Prosthetic Records. The band's third album, Phantazein, was released in January 2024 through Willowtip Records.

In May 2026 the band released their fourth full-length album titled In Light, No Shape marking their second release through Willowtip Records.

Throughout the years the band has received coverage by various online and print publications, such as Terrorizer (magazine), Revolver (magazine) and Decibel (magazine).

== History ==
The band was initially formed as a studio project by guitarist Alex Baillie and vocalist Henry Pryce in 2012. They self-released their first EP Inquisition in 2013 followed by their second EP _Inceptum in 2014, which included session drummer Alex Rüdinger. In 2016, they were joined by drummer David Diepold and self-released their third EP, Illusory.

In 2018 they were joined by bassist Chris Binns and after signing with Prosthetic Records, released their debut full-length album Malignant Dominion. In early 2020, Apostolis Karydis (aka Paul Yage) joined as their second guitarist and in 2021 the band released their second full-length album Upheaval. The band took a more intense approach with this album and is known for its technical guitar work and high tempos, with some tracks reaching as high as 280 bpm.

In 2023 the band announced that they had ended their relationship with Prosthetic Records and that they would release their next album through Willowtip Records. Phantazein, the band's third full-length album, was released through Willowtip Records in January 2024. This time the band took a slightly different approach again, choosing to focus more on Groove (music), Harmony and creating a more intricate sonic soundscape with the production of the album.

In early 2026 a statement was released by the band stating that vocalist Henry Pryce had left the band and that guitarist Alex Baillie would step in to handle the vocal duties on the upcoming album. In May of 2026 the band released their fourth album titled In Light, No Shape through Willowtip Records with the artwork being provided by Jef Whitehead of Leviathan (musical project).

== Personnel ==
=== Current members ===
- Alex Baillie - vocals, guitar
- Apostolis "Paul Yage" Karydis - guitar
- Chris Binns - bass
- David Diepold - drums

=== Former members ===
- Henry Pryce - vocals
- Philip Archbold - bass

=== Session musicians ===
- Alex Rüdinger - drums
- Romain Goulon - drums

== Discography ==
=== Studio albums ===
Full-length releases
Album name	Release date	Label
Malignant Dominion	September 6, 2019	Prosthetic Records
Upheaval	September 24, 2021	Prosthetic Records
Phantazein	January 26, 2024	Willowtip Records
In Light, No Shape	May 1, 2026	Willowtip Records

=== EPs ===
- Inquisition (2013)
- _Inceptum (2014)
- Illusory (2016)
