= Mindscar =

American technical death metal band

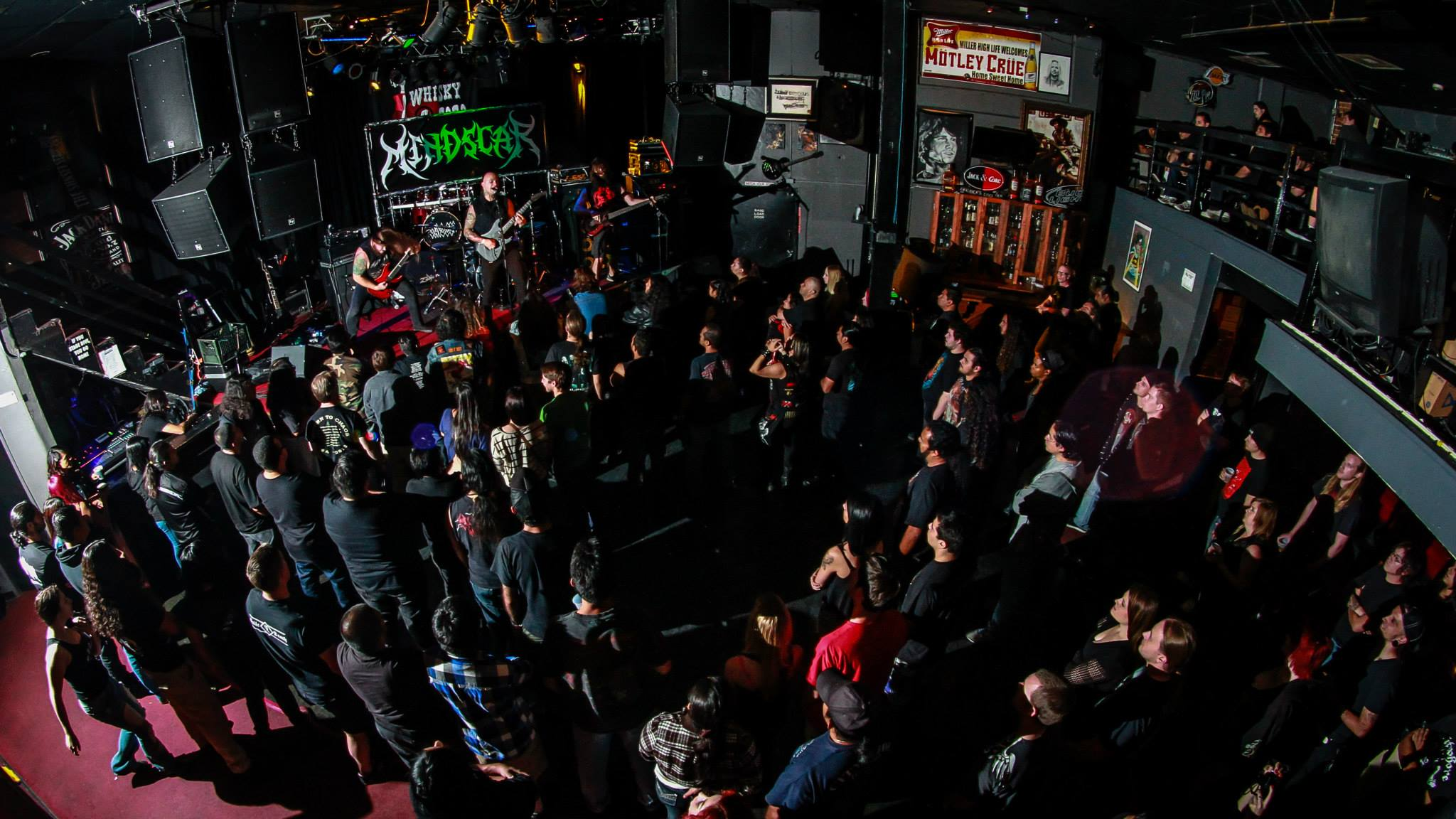
- Mindscar performing at the Whisky a Go Go in Hollywood, CA, 2013

Background information
- Origin: Orlando, Florida, U.S.
- Genres: Technical death metal, black metal
- Years active: 1998–2002, 2013–present
- Members: Richie Brown; Terran Fernandez; Robbie Young; Alyssa Day
- Past members: Mike Radford; Matt Heafy; Erich Geuter; Jacob Belkerdid
- Website: mindscar.com

Mindscar is an American technical death metal band from Orlando, Florida, founded in 1998. The band is led by guitarist/vocalist Richie Brown, who has played with Trivium and Nader Sadek. Mindscar has toured with acts such as Vader and Vital Remains.

== History ==
Mindscar was formed by Richie Brown (vocals/guitar) and Mike Radford (drums) in 1998. In 2001, the band made an impact throughout the Central Florida region, performing numerous shows, self-releasing demos and EPs, a television performance, international airplay and publicity. In 2002, Matt Heafy of Trivium joined the band on guitar and backup vocals. After internal issues due to the age of its band members, Mindscar was unable to tour and disbanded for a decade.

In 2012, Richie Brown and Mike Radford reunited in a recording studio to track 'Thornz Ov Ill Lechery' and 'Blind Masses'. The two tracks led to performing and touring opportunities. Brown reformed the band in March 2013, and the first live performance in over a decade took place alongside Massacre in Tampa, Florida at the Brass Mug. Soon after, Mindscar embarked on their first tour supporting Vader and Vital Remains on the Back To The Black US Tour 2013.

In 2014, Mindscar began tracking their debut full-length album, Kill The King. After the Southern Scorcher US Tour 2014 with Infinite Earths, Brown asked Terran Fernandez, bassist from Infinite Earths, to join Mindscar. Fernandez accepted. Matt Heafy contributed clean vocals for a few songs and a guitar solo for the song "Asmodeus", premiered on Metal Injection in September 2014.

Mindscar independently released Kill The King on January 8, 2015, followed by a sold-out hometown show with Andrew W.K., a headline show in San Juan, Puerto Rico, and a US tour with Ulcer. After returning from this tour, Radford left the band for personal reasons and was replaced with Robbie Young (Nailshitter/Double Veteran). Shortly after Young joined the band, Mindscar completed their most successful tour to date, the Golden Gods of Death US Tour 2015.

== Members ==
Current members

- Richie Brown – vocals, guitars (1998–present)
- Terran Fernandez – bass (2014–present)
- Tommy Beheler – drums (2017–present)
- Alyssa Day – guitar (2016–present)

Former members

- Mike Radford – drums (1998–2015)
- Matt Heafy – guitars, backing vocals (2002)
- Erich Geuter – guitars, backing vocals (2013)
- Jacob Belkerdid – bass, backing vocals (2013)
- Brian Mock – keyboards, backing vocals (2001–2002)

Touring musicians

- Kenneth Michael Reda – bass, backing vocals (2014)

== Discography ==
Mindscar discography
- Studio albums: 2
- EPs: 1
- Demos: 3

Studio albums

List of studio albums
Year	Studio albums details
2015	Kill the King: Released: January 8, 2015; Label: Self-released; Formats: CD, digital download
2016	What's Beyond the Light: Released: August 19, 2016; Label: Self-released; Formats: CD, digital download

EP

Year	EP details
2001	Mindscar: Released: May 12, 2001; Label: Unholy Grail; Formats: CD

Demos

List of demos
Year	Demos details
1999	Five Tales from the Dark Underworld: Released: 1999; Label: Grim Grinder Records; Formats: CD
2012	Thornz: Released: June 1, 2012; Label: Self-released; Formats: digital download
2013	Ashes: Released: April 26, 2013; Label: Self-released; Formats: digital download
