= Conquering Dystopia (album) =

Studio album by Conquering Dystopia
- Released: March 10, 2014
- Recorded: December 2013, Audio Hammer Studios
- Genre: Technical death metal, progressive metal, instrumental
- Length: 52:56
- Label: Self-released (Digital release); Century Media Records (LP release)
- Producer: Mark Lewis

Conquering Dystopia is the debut album by the instrumental technical death metal band Conquering Dystopia, digitally released on March 10, 2014. On July 8, 2014 Conquering Dystopia was made available on vinyl and released via Century Media Records.

== History ==
In early 2013 solo guitarist Keith Merrow announced via his Facebook page that he and former Nevermore guitarist Jeff Loomis would record an album together. In July 2013 Merrow and Loomis, now going by the name Conquering Dystopia, launched a crowdfunding campaign on Indiegogo in order to fund the recording of the album and announced that the band's lineup would also feature Cannibal Corpse bassist Alex Webster and former The Faceless drummer Alex Rüdinger. The campaign goal of $15,000 was reached in less than 24 hours.

In December 2013 Conquering Dystopia recorded the album at the Audio Hammer Studios with producer Mark Lewis.

== Track listing ==
No.	Title	Length
1.	"Prelude to Obliteration"	4:39
2.	"Tethys"	5:16
3.	"Ashes of Lesser Men"	5:35
4.	"Doomsday Clock"	2:15
5.	"Inexhaustible Savagery"	4:05
6.	"Totalitarian Sphere"	4:35
7.	"Lachrymose"	3:02
8.	"Autarch"	5:07
9.	"Nuclear Justice"	5:51
10.	"Kufra at Dusk"	3:54
11.	"Resurrection in Black"	1:01
12.	"Destroyer of Dreams"	7:36
Total length:		52:56

== Personnel ==
Conquering Dystopia

- Jeff Loomis - guitar
- Keith Merrow - guitar
- Alex Webster - bass
- Alex Rüdinger - drums

Guest musicians

- Ola Englund - guitar solo on "Totalitarian Sphere"
- Wes Hauch - guitar solo on "Autarch"

Production

- Mark Lewis - producer, mixing
- Eyal Levi - engineering
