= Matt Heafy =

American singer and guitarist (born 1986)

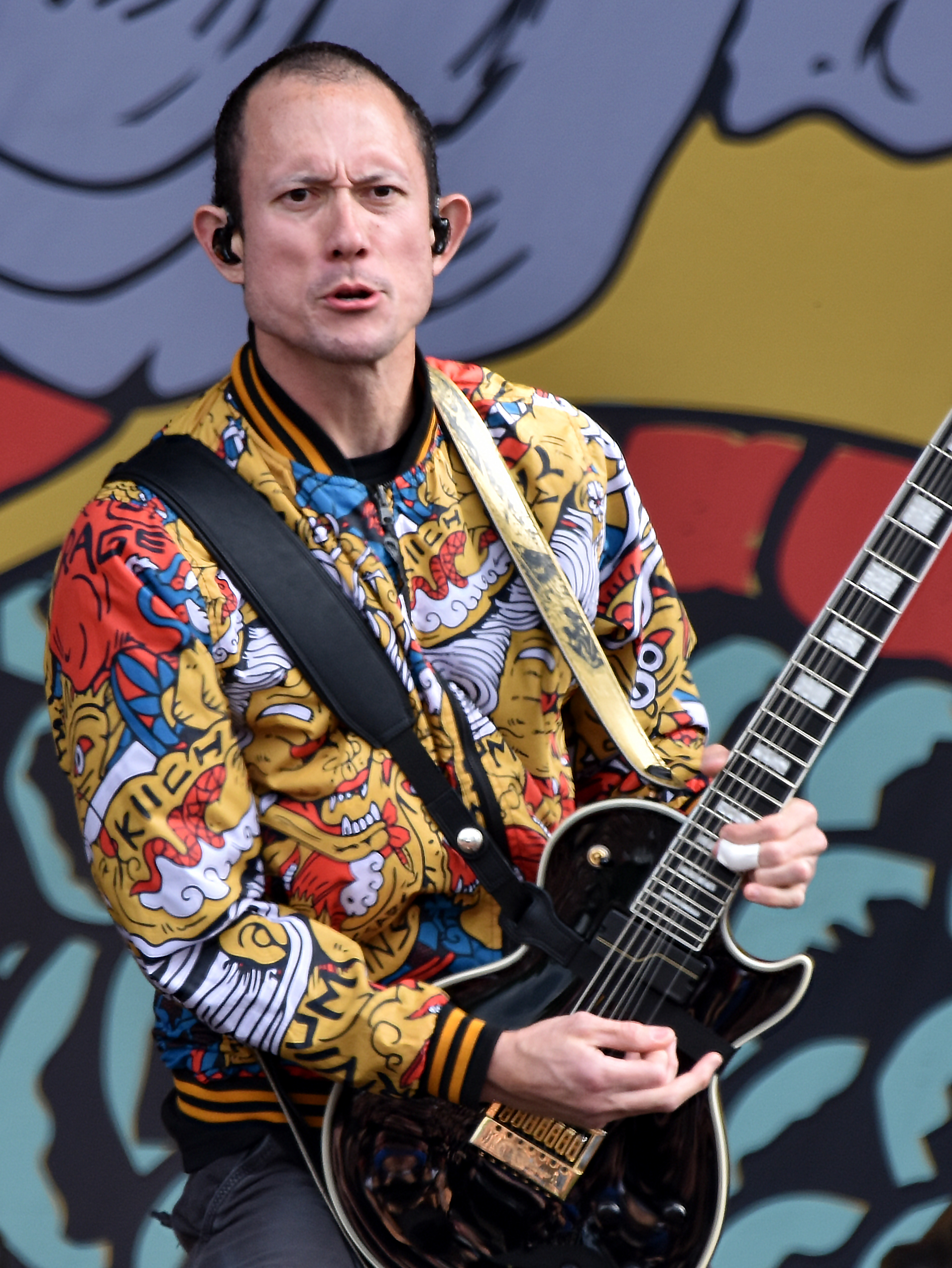
- Heafy with Trivium at Wacken Open Air 2023

Background information
- Born: January 26, 1986 (age 40); Iwakuni, Japan
- Origin: Orlando, Florida, U.S.
- Genres: Metalcore; thrash metal; heavy metal; progressive metal; technical death metal; black metal
- Occupations: Musician; singer; songwriter
- Instruments: Vocals; guitar
- Years active: 1998–present
- Member of: Trivium; Ibaraki
- Formerly of: Capharnaum; Mindscar
- Website: trivium.org twitch.tv/matthewkheafy

Matthew Kiichi Heafy (/ˈheɪfi/ HAY-fee; born January 26, 1986) is a Japanese-American guitarist and singer best known as the frontman of heavy metal band Trivium. He was also the lead vocalist for the band Capharnaum, along with Trivium's former producer Jason Suecof. In 2017, Heafy was voted sixth on the Ultimate Guitar list "Top 25 Greatest Modern Frontmen". In 2023, Jake Richardson of Loudwire included him in his list of the "10 Best Clean Singers in Metalcore".

== Early life ==
Heafy was born in Iwakuni, Japan, on January 26, 1986, to a Japanese mother and an American father. His father, formerly a member of the United States Marine Corps, is half-Irish and half-German. Heafy has a younger sister, Michelle, who is also a musician, fronting the band OrcaMind and also performing music on YouTube. Although Heafy was born in Japan, he lived there for only one year and does not speak Japanese fluently; however, he uses some basic phrases when he performs in Japan. His family then moved to Orlando, Florida, where he currently resides. Heafy attended Lake Brantley High School. He completed his senior year while also touring in Europe and graduated in 2004. During those years, Heafy lived a straight edge lifestyle.

Heafy learned to play the tenor saxophone while practicing guitar, becoming more serious about the latter instrument at the age of eleven. During this period, he mostly listened to pop-punk and auditioned for a local band, "Freshly Squeezed", by playing the Blink-182 song "Dammit." However, he never got a follow-up call back. Heafy cites being introduced to heavy metal by his classmate, David, who gave him a copy of Metallica's self-titled album.

Heafy is self-taught; he has not studied formal music theory. He can read sheet music, but can only apply it when playing the saxophone. In 2015, he began formal guitar training. "Self-taught for quite a bit of it, did lessons on and off for maybe two or three years, but I do not know anything formal music on guitar. I do on saxophone though…but that doesn't help me on guitar."

== Career ==
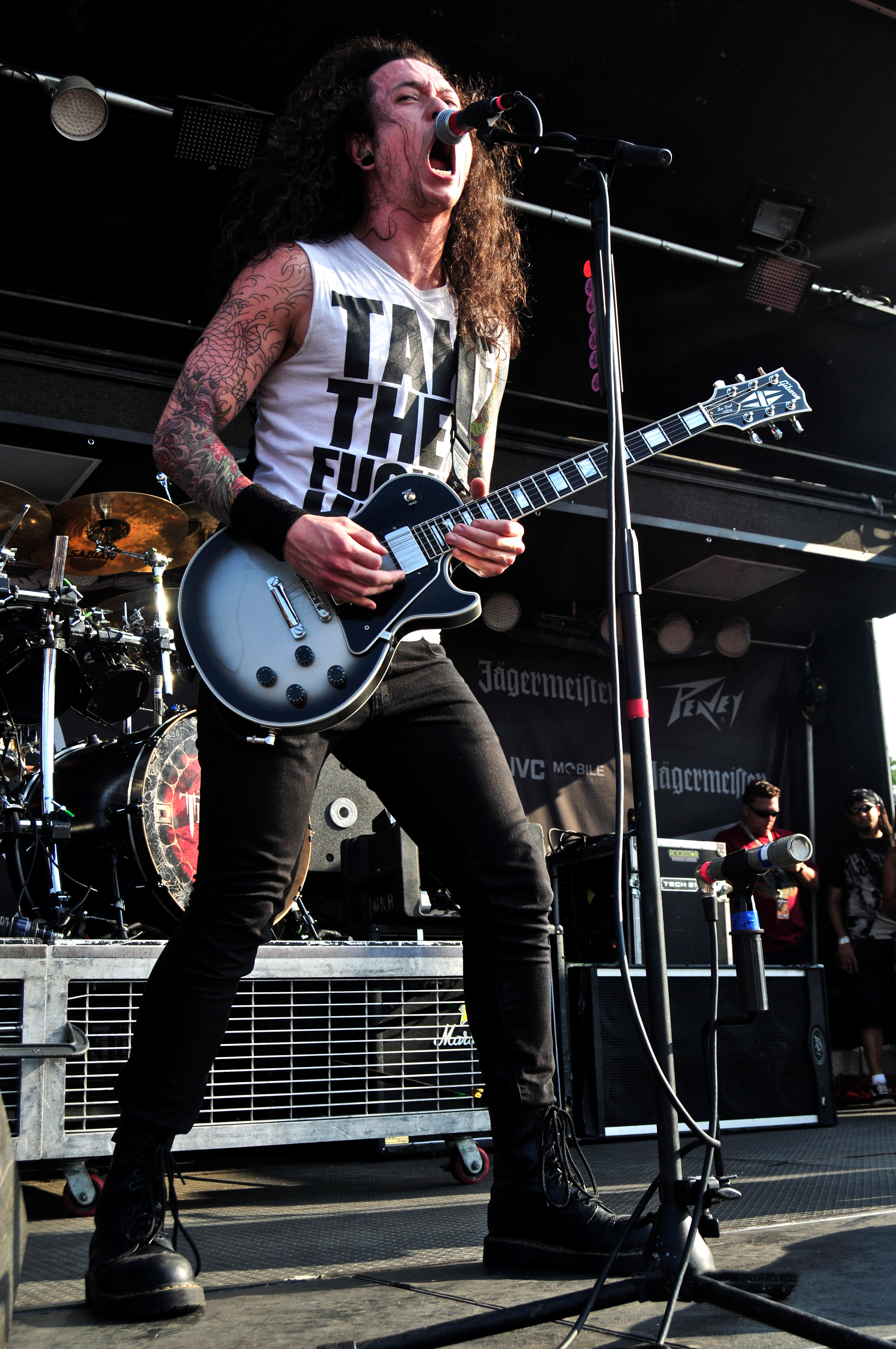
Heafy performing at Mayhem Festival 2009

Following his guitar performance at the school's talent show, Heafy was asked to try out for Trivium by the band's original singer, Brad Lewter. Despite being only 13 years old (other members were 15–16 at that time), Heafy was accepted as lead guitarist. Lewter later left the band in 2000 due to creative differences over the band's future musical direction. Drummer Travis Smith persuaded Heafy to do vocals, even though Heafy himself was unsure of his singing voice at the time. The band started looking for an external singer to fill the position but had trouble finding a suitable candidate. Eventually, Heafy agreed to become a full-time lead singer for Trivium while keeping the position of lead guitarist for the band. He taught himself growling and screaming, especially doing so during the band's early years. However, he admitted that using improper technique caused severe damage to his vocal chords in the years leading up to the band's performance at Rock on the Range in 2014, where he lost his voice on stage. That same year, he started taking vocal lessons from coach Ron Anderson, following advice from M. Shadows of Avenged Sevenfold. In 2016, Heafy returned to performing live unclean vocals with the same frequency as he did prior to his injury, citing Anderson's lessons as a source of help and improvement. He claims that the new technique is actually easier than normal talking.

With the release of Trivium's fourth album, Shogun, Heafy greatly expanded his vocal range, going from melodic singing to hardcore screams. In 2011, Trivium's fifth studio album, In Waves, was released with a 'greater emphasis on songs rather than skill,' with the album featuring the full range of Heafy's vocal talents, with some songs being entirely composed of screaming, others with no screaming at all, and many songs that fused the two, like previous releases.

In Trivium, Heafy occasionally shares lead guitar duties with Corey Beaulieu, although he is responsible for recording the rhythm tracks on the albums.

After Ember to Inferno, Heafy jokingly played in the post-hardcore genre, releasing one song titled "Head on Collision with a Rosebush Catching Fire" under the name Tomorrow Is Monday.

On December 4, 2020, Heafy released a collaborative 5-track EP with American YouTuber and musician Jared Dines.

=== Ibaraki ===
Ibaraki
- Also known as: Mrityu (formerly)
- Origin: United States
- Genres: Progressive metal; black metal; metalcore
- Years active: 2012–2020 (as Mrityu), 2022–present
- Label: Nuclear Blast

On January 21, 2022, Heafy unveiled the first single, "Tamashii no Houkai", from his black metal influenced project Ibaraki. The song features Ihsahn of black metal band Emperor.

Ibaraki's debut album, Rashomon, was released on May 6, 2022, which features Nergal of Behemoth and Gerard Way of My Chemical Romance, in addition to Ihsahn. The album's lyrics were inspired by Heafy's Japanese heritage, drawing from Japanese mythology and folklore.

=== Roadrunner United ===
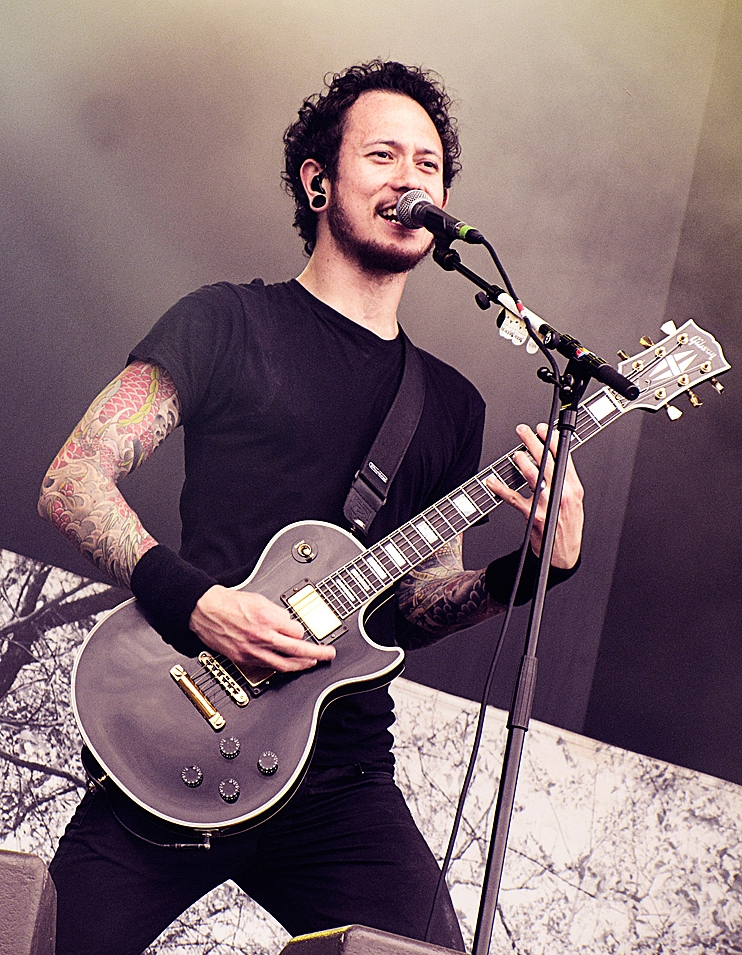
Heafy in 2012

In 2005, Roadrunner Records released Roadrunner United: The All-Star Sessions to celebrate the label's 25th anniversary. Four "team captains" were chosen: Joey Jordison (Slipknot, Murderdolls, Scar the Martyr), Robb Flynn (Machine Head), and Dino Cazares (Fear Factory), as well as Heafy. Heafy also wrote the lyrics and sang the lead vocals to "The End," captained by Dino Cazares. He and bandmate/guitarist Corey Beaulieu recorded the song "In the Fire" as well, featuring singer King Diamond, bassist Mike D'Antonio, and drummer Dave Chavarri. He also wrote and played guitar on the tracks "Dawn of a Golden Age", "I Don't Wanna Be (A Superhero)" and "Blood and Flames," also contributing vocals to the latter.

=== Other appearances ===
Heafy won the Metal Hammer "Golden God" award in 2006.

The same year, he sang one song, "Blind", for Korn at the Download Festival when Korn's lead vocalist Jonathan Davis fell ill.

Heafy—along with several other metal artists—makes guest appearances in the music videos for "Aesthetics of Hate" by Machine Head, "All I Want" by A Day to Remember, and "Moving On" by Asking Alexandria.

In 2014, Heafy contributed to DragonForce's sixth studio album, titled Maximum Overload. He performed backing vocals in three of the album's ten tracks: "The Game", "Defenders", and "No More".

In 2015, Heafy contributed to the metal supergroup album Metal Allegiance. He provided lead vocals and additional guitars on the track "Destination: Nowhere". He also contributed on guitar for the track "Triangulum I. Creation II. Evolution III. Destruction".

In 2016, Heafy appeared on the album Arktis by fellow musician Ihsahn.

In October 2019, Heafy was a featured guest-vocalist on an acoustic version of "Stabbing in the Dark" by Ice Nine Kills.

On December 4, 2020, Heafy appeared on a 5-song collaborative EP with YouTuber Jared Dines titled "Dines x Heafy". The music video for the song "Dear Anxiety" was also released on the same day. Heafy and Dines had previously collaborated on a cover of "Better Now" by Post Malone.

On July 16, 2021, Heafy provided guest vocals on Powerwolf's re-recording of "Fist by Fist (Sacralize or Strike)" on the deluxe version of Call of the Wild.

Heafy appears as a guest vocalist in Funcom's Metal: Hellsinger, and has provided two songs for "The Awakened King" expansion of Remnant 2. He's acting as composer and sound designer for the upcoming game Martial Arts Tycoon.

Since November 23, 2022, Heafy has hosted "Chaos Hour" on SiriusXM Liquid Metal. The show airs every Wednesday at 6 PM ET and features Heafy's curated playlists of metal music that inspires him, along with guests from the metal and gaming communities.

On November 10, 2023, Heafy performed the song "Tears Don't Fall" on stage with Bullet For My Valentine at their show in Orlando.

Heafy had a guest appearance on Enterprise Earth's fifth studio album Death:An Anthology which was released on February 2, 2024.

In 2026, Heafy featured on the song "Divide & Betray" by Australian DJ and record producer Will Sparks.

== Equipment ==
=== Guitars ===
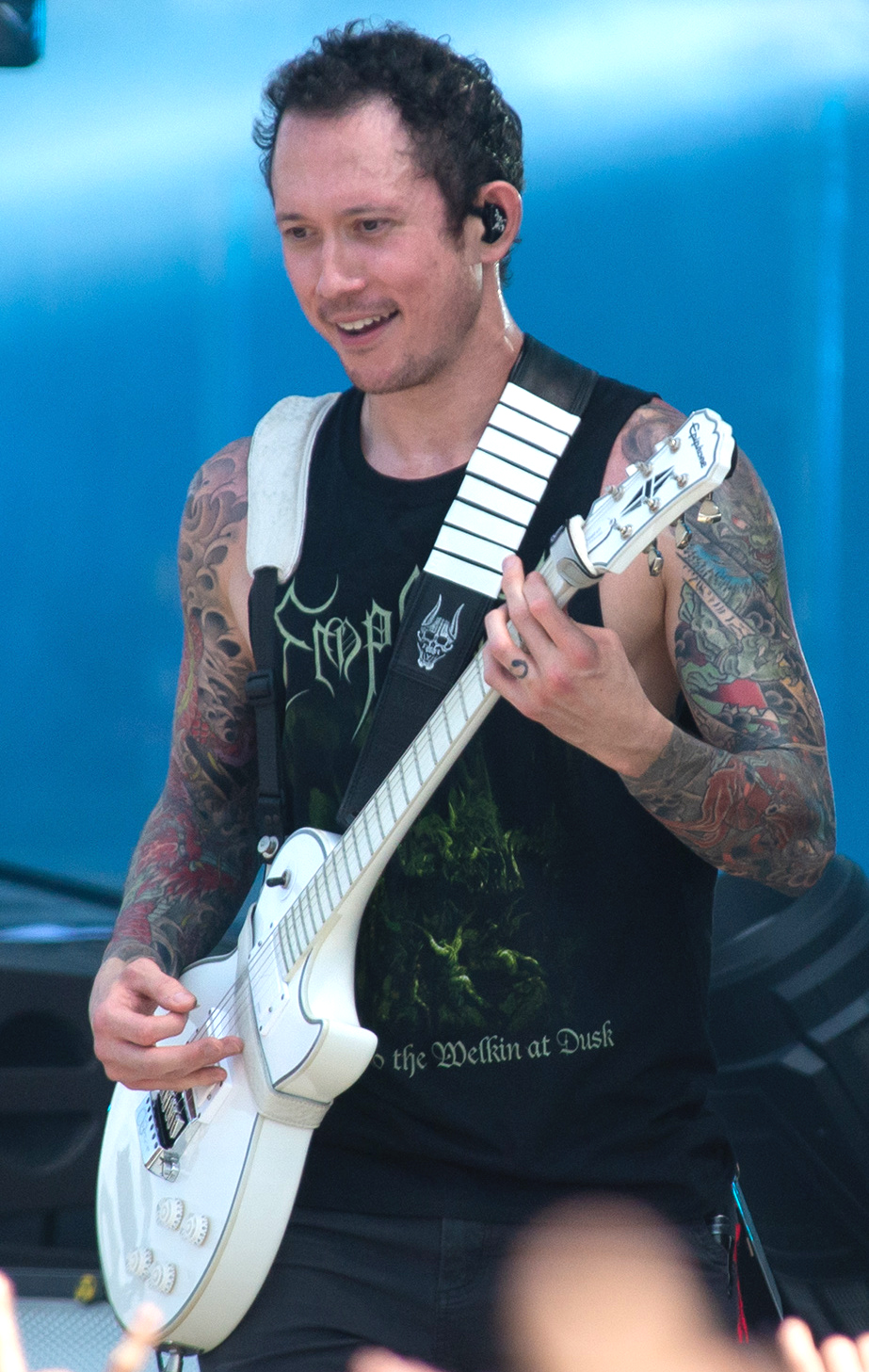
Heafy playing his Epiphone "Snøfall" custom guitar in 2019

Since 2009, Heafy had endorsed Gibson. Prior to that, he endorsed Dean Guitars after he and Corey Beaulieu were given Dean Razorback prototypes in 2006. In 2008, his signature model, an ML shape with a graphic of the Japanese Rising Sun, was released. He stopped using Dean Guitars following some disagreements. In summer 2009, Gibson made Heafy a custom 7-string Explorer, which later became a production model.

In 2013, Epiphone released his artist signature model Les Paul in both 6- and 7-string versions. Heafy was previously seen playing his signature models on the Dream Theater "A Dramatic Turn of Events Tour". In 2017, Epiphone released a new signature model called "Snøfall", inspired by Trivium's 2015 album Silence in the Snow. In 2022, Epiphone released his signature Les Paul Custom Origins with his signature Fishman Fluence pickups and in black and white, 6- and 7-strings and right and left-handed configurations. In October 2026, Heafy announced his endorsement with Jackson Guitars.

- Epiphone Les Paul Custom Origins Signature
- Epiphone Les Paul Custom Signature Model
- Epiphone Les Paul Custom "Snøfall" Signature Model
- Gibson Les Paul Custom
- Gibson Explorer
- Gibson Hummingbird
- Dean ML MKH Rising Sun
- Dean Razorback

== Personal life ==
On January 9, 2010, Heafy married Ashley Howard in Orlando, Florida with a small private ceremony. The couple has twins: a daughter and a son, born on November 6, 2018. Heafy missed some tour dates to be present for the birth of his children, during which time Howard Jones and Johannes Eckerström performed guest vocals for Trivium, with YouTuber Jared Dines guesting on guitar.

Heafy has been confused with musician Matty Healy on multiple occasions due to their similar names. In January 2023, Heafy responded to a Cameo request from a user who mistook him for Healy.

=== Twitch streaming ===
Heafy is a gamer and practitioner of Brazilian jiu-jitsu. He live streams daily on his Twitch channel "matthewkheafy", which consists of him playing video games, running guitar clinics, performing vocal warm-ups, showcasing his Brazilian jiu-jitsu classes, and playing Trivium songs and acoustic covers.

== Discography ==
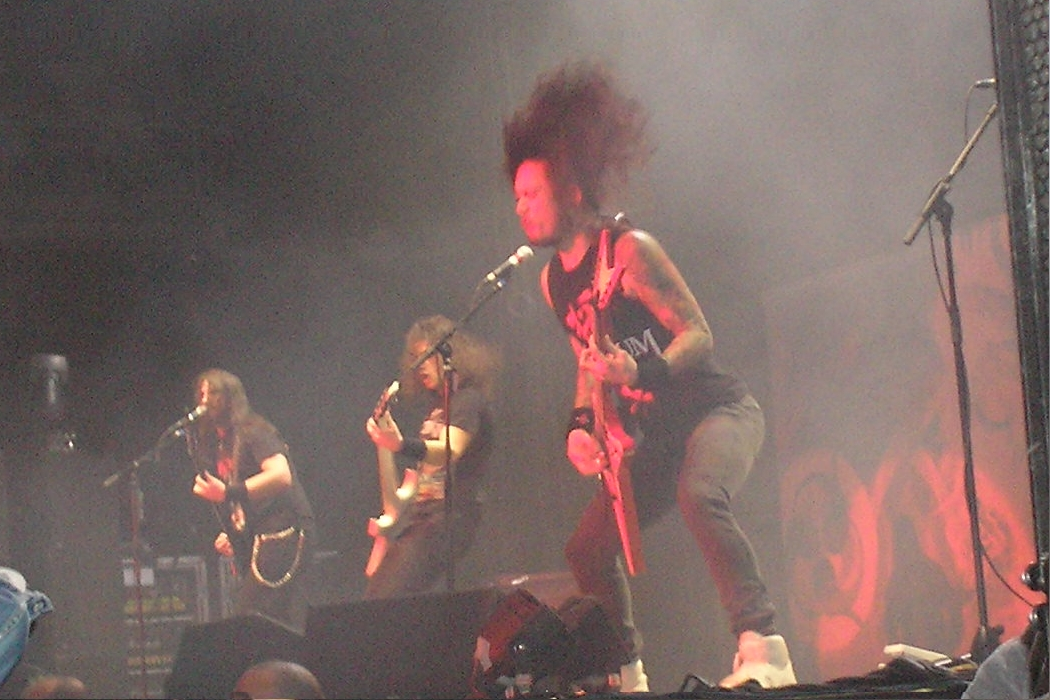
Heafy performing with Trivium in 2008

=== With Trivium ===
- Ember to Inferno (2003)
- Ascendancy (2005)
- The Crusade (2006)
- Shogun (2008)
- In Waves (2011)
- Vengeance Falls (2013)
- Silence in the Snow (2015)
- The Sin and the Sentence (2017)
- What the Dead Men Say (2020)
- In the Court of the Dragon (2021)

=== With Capharnaum ===
- Fractured (2004)

=== Mindscar ===
- "Midwinter Darkness" demo (2002)
- Kill the King (2015) - guitars (track 1), vocals (tracks 1, 7, 8)

=== Tomorrow Is Monday ===
- Lush Like an Antpile (2004)
- "Head on Collision with a Rosebush Catching Fire" (2004)

=== With Jared Dines ===
- Dines x Heafy (2020)

=== With Ibaraki ===
- Rashomon (2022)

=== Others ===
- Roadrunner United (2005)
- "Master of Puppets" (2006)
- Machine Head – "Aesthetics of Hate" (Music video cameo) (2007)
- Maiden Heaven: A Tribute to Iron Maiden (2008)
- A Day to Remember – "All I Want" (Music video cameo) (2011)
- Caliban – "Falling Downwards" (Bonus track) - Ghost Empire (2014)
- DragonForce – guest vocals on songs "The Game", "No More" and "Defenders" off the album Maximum Overload (2014)
- Upon a Burning Body – guest vocals on "Blood, Sweat and Tears" - The World Is My Enemy Now (2014)
- "The Wretchedness Inside" (2014)
- Asking Alexandria – "Moving On" (Music video cameo) (2014)
- Metal Allegiance – lead vocals and additional guitar on "Destination: Nowhere", additional guitars on "Triangulum I. Creation II. Evolution III. Destruction" (2015)
- Maiden Heaven Volume 2: An All-Star Tribute To Iron Maiden (2016)
- Ihsahn – backing vocals on "Mass Darkness" off the album Arktis (2016)
- Any Given Day – guest vocals on "Arise" off the album Everlasting (2016), also in the music video for the song
- SHVPES – guest vocals on "Rain" off the album Greater Than (2018)
- In Vain – guest vocals on "Soul Adventurer" off the album Currents (2018), also in the music video for the song
- Ice Nine Kills – guest vocals on acoustic version of "Stabbing in the Dark" (2019) (original song from The Silver Scream)
- Jamey Jasta – guest vocals on "When The Contagion Is You" off the album The Lost Chapters Volume 2 (2019)
- Cabal – guest vocals on "Bitter Friend" off the album Drag Me Down (2020)
- Me and that Man – guest vocals on "You Will Be Mine" off the album New Man, New Songs, Same Shit, Vol. 1 (2020)
- Chthonic – guest vocals on "Supreme Pain for the Tyrant-Rearrange 2.0" (2020)
- Bleed from Within – guest guitar on "Night Crossing" off the album Fracture (2020)
- Daniel Tompkins – guest vocals on "The Gift" off the solo album Ruins (2020)
- Powerwolf – guest vocals on re-recording of "Fist by Fist (Sacralize or Strike)" off the deluxe version of Call of the Wild (2021)
- August Burns Red – guest vocals on re-recording of "Internal Cannon" off the album Leveler: 10th Anniversary Edition (2021)
- The Halo Effect – guest vocals on "Last of Our Kind" off the album Days Of The Lost (2022)
- Malevolence – guest guitar on "Salvation" off the album Malicious Intent (2022)
- Ingested – guest vocals on "All I've Lost" from the album Ashes Lie Still (2022)
- Frozen Soul – production; vocals/guitar on "Glacial Domination" and "Abominable" from Glacial Domination (2023)
- Mercenary – guest vocals on "Heart of the Numb" off the album Soundtrack for the End Times (2023)
- Enterprise Earth – guest vocals on "Curse of Flesh" off the album Death: An Anthology (2024)
- Ryujin – production; guest vocals on "Raijin & Fujin", "The Rainbow Song", and "Saigo No Hoshi" (single version) from Ryujin (2024)
- DragonForce – guest vocals on "Astro Warrior Anthem" off the album Warp Speed Warriors (bonus disc) (2024)
- Distant – guest vocals on "Torturous Symphony" off the album "Tsukuyomi: The Origin" (2024)
- Downfall of Mankind – guest vocals on "Purgatory" off the album "Purgatory" (2024)
- Burner – guest vocals on "Sunrise, Parabellum" off the album "No One Is Coming To Save Us" (2026)
- Will Sparks – guest vocals on the single "Divide & Betray" (2026)
- Defects – guest vocals on the single "Signs" off the album "Artificial Icons" (2026)
