= DrumIt Five =

Family of electronic drumset

The DrumIt Five is an electronic drum line produced by 2box, a Swedish company started by former employees of ddrum. The kit is based on tunable mesh drum heads, similar to Roland's V-Drum line. The focus of its design is to produce more natural sounds than are characteristic of most electronic drum kits on the market.

The DrumIt's drum trigger pads offer separate rim triggers, while its cymbal pads offer three separate triggers for edge, bow, and bell, respectively. The cymbals can also sense "chokes", i.e. when the player grabs the cymbal by hand after a strike in order to mute its sound. All of the DrumIt's drum heads can be replaced with mesh, rubber, or standard acoustic mylar heads.

The kit's central module includes 4 GB of flash memory and 100 sets of drum kit sounds, each with up to 127 velocity layers, along with the ability to change and layer sounds in a variety of ways. New sounds can be downloaded from the manufacturer's website, or created via included software operated from a PC. Play-along music can also be transferred onto the module from a computer.

Unlike most electronic drum kits, the DrumIt Five kit comes with its own complete set of proprietary hardware, including mounting rack, hi-hat stand, and bass drum pedal.
