= Paul Wandtke =

American drummer

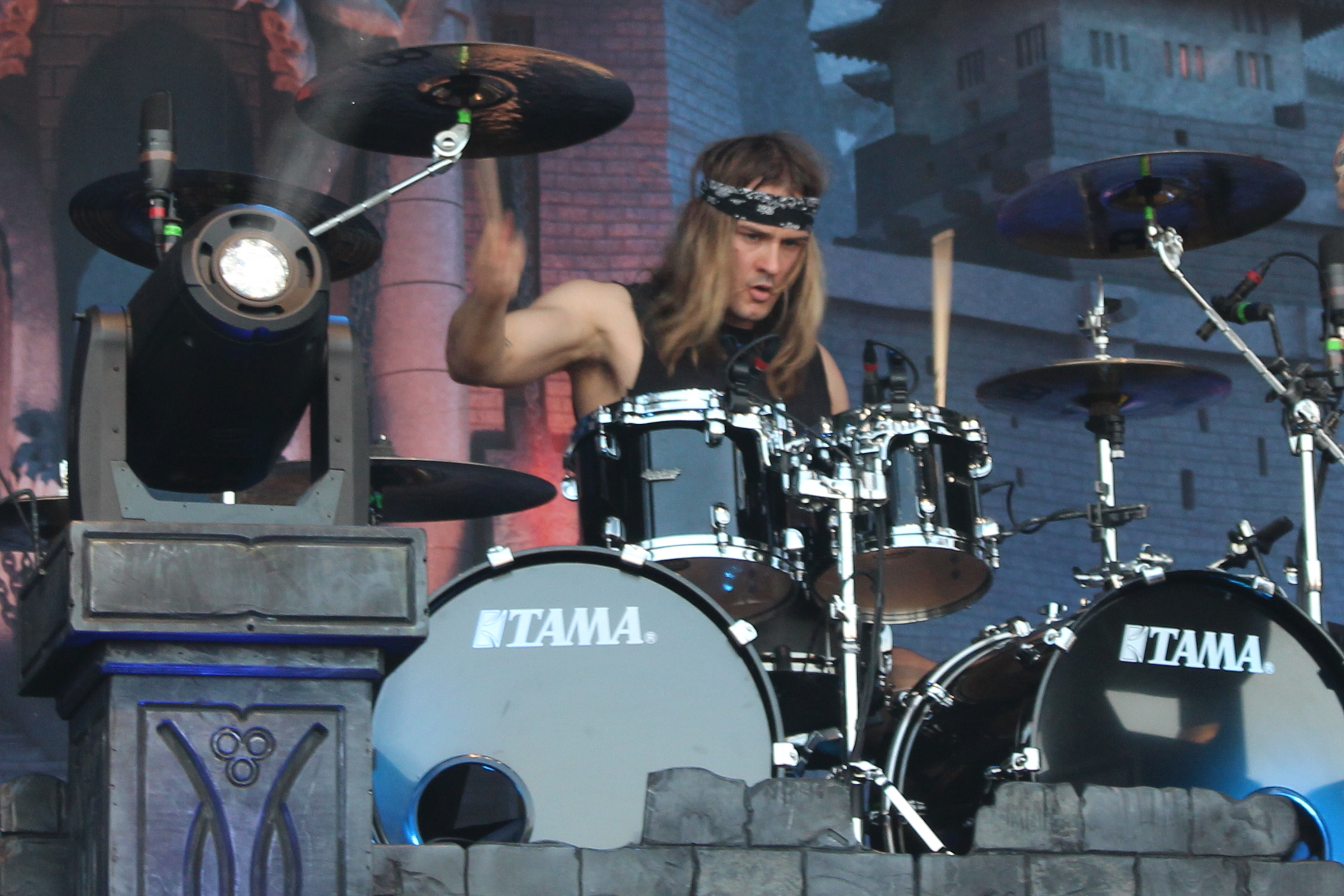
- Wandtke performing live with Trivium in 2016

Background information
- Born: Paul Wandtke; December 20, 1985 (age 40); Chicago, Illinois, U.S.
- Genres: Heavy metal; grunge
- Occupations: Musician; songwriter; producer
- Instruments: Drums; vocals; guitar
- Years active: 2007–present
- Label: Roadrunner
- Member of: Dead Original
- Formerly of: Trivium
- Website: paulwandtke.com

Paul Wandtke (born December 20, 1985) is an American musician, songwriter and producer who is the current drummer of heavy metal band Bedlem. In addition, Wandtke is lead vocalist and lead guitarist of grunge band Dead Original. He is a former drummer for Trivium and previously toured with Kill Hannah. Wandtke has been to over 48 countries as a professional drummer.

== Early life ==
Wandtke was born December 20, 1985, and raised in Chicago, Illinois. He attended the Berklee College of Music in Boston, Massachusetts.

== Music career ==
=== Early career ===
Wandtke has previously drummed for the hit musical Rock of Ages and as touring drummer for Kill Hannah during the band's main-support run with the Smashing Pumpkins.

=== Trivium ===
He joined Trivium on December 5, 2015, by playing a debut show in front of 40,000 people in Mexico at Slipknot's "Knotfest" Festival. He was referred to Trivium via Dream Theater's Mike Mangini when Trivium had asked John Petrucci if they knew any drummers they could check out for a new replacement. In early 2017, Wandtke left Trivium.

=== Bedlem ===
In 2017, Wandtke launched the band Bedlem with lead vocalist Mike Petrasek, lead guitarist Joey Trace Brassal and bassist Brian Ahern after his departure from Trivium. Bedlem released their debut single "Triumph" on February 6, 2017. Their debut album was released on October 31, 2018.

=== Dead Original ===
In 2017, Wandtke formed the grunge band Dead Original with bassist Dina Simone and drummer Rob Lerner. Dead Original released their debut single "Bored Again" on December 28, 2017. Their debut album, Bought and Sold, is set to be released on November 13, 2020.

=== Side projects ===
He also sings and plays guitar for a national touring Nirvana tribute band called Smells Like Nirvana, which is based in Chicago and have performed fly-in casino dates as well as many midwest dates with plans to do some tours in 2017. Paul Wandtke has said that Nirvana is the reason he got into music so that's why Smells Like Nirvana was created, also because it was an attempt to gain some experience as a frontman to later start his own original band.

== Equipment ==
He is endorsed by Tama drums, Meinl cymbals, Evans drum heads, Vic Firth drum sticks, Pure Fix cycles, Vratim shoes and Humes and Berg cases.

== Discography ==
Bedlem

- Back to Bedlem (2018)

Dead Original

- Bored Again (2018)
