= Alex Bent =

American drummer (born 1993)

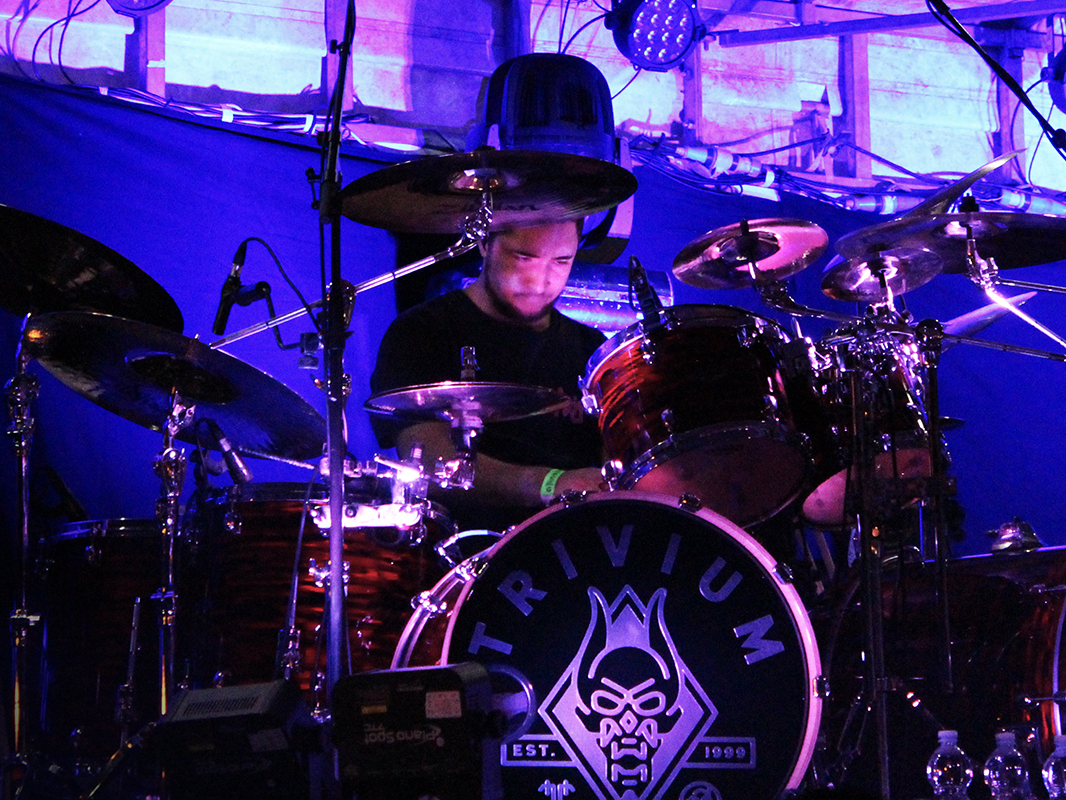
- Bent performing with Trivium in 2017

Background information
- Born: January 31, 1993 (age 33); Oakland, California, U.S.
- Genres: Heavy metal; thrash metal; groove metal; melodic death metal; technical death metal; metalcore
- Occupation: Musician
- Instruments: Drums; percussion
- Years active: 2005–present
- Member of: Arkaik; Dragonlord
- Formerly of: Brain Drill; Hatriot; Battlecross; Trivium
- Website: alexbentdrums.com

Alex Bent (born January 31, 1993) is an American musician, best known as the former drummer of heavy metal band Trivium, in which he played from 2017 until 2025. He is a member of the heavy metal bands Arkaik and Dragonlord. Bent is also a former drummer for Battlecross and Brain Drill, and has also toured with Decrepit Birth and Testament.

== Early life ==
Bent was born January 31, 1993, in Oakland, California. When he turned 11 years of age, he asked his father to assemble his old drum kit. After teaching himself how to perform percussion for just over one year, he competed in drum competitions and auditioned for various musical ensembles.

When Bent turned 15, he performed with Marching Band, Concert Band, Jazz Band, Modesto Junior College Jazz Band in addition to other local musical groups. Within the next 3 years, he participated in the Guitar Center Drum Off making it to Regional Finals.

== Career ==
In 2011, Bent joined Arkaik, touring with Decrepit Birth and Hatriot in 2012 and becoming a settled member of Brain Drill and Dragonlord in 2015.

In April 2015, American blue collar metal band Battlecross employed Bent for their "Summer of Doom Tour" with Crowbar and Lord Dying. Later that year, Bent filled in for Gene Hoglan of Testament.

At the recommendation of producer Mark Lewis, Trivium had Bent audition for the role as their new drummer, replacing former drummer Paul Wandtke. In January 2017, Trivium confirmed Bent as their drummer for their February 2017 European tour with Sikth and Shvpes. Bent played with Trivium for eight years, leaving the band on October 3, 2025.

== Discography ==
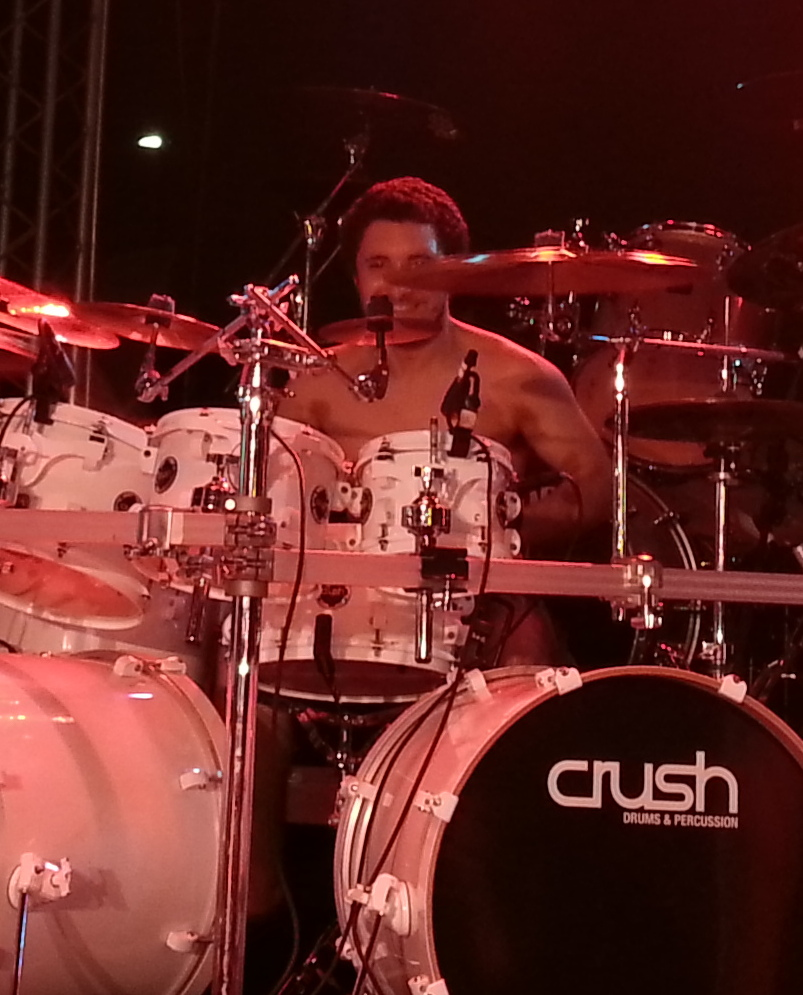
Bent performing with Battlecross in 2015

=== Trivium ===
- The Sin and the Sentence (2017)
- What the Dead Men Say (2020)
- In the Court of the Dragon (2021)
- Struck Dead (2025)

=== Brain Drill ===
- Boundless Obscenity (2016)

=== Dragonlord ===
- Dominion (2018)

=== Alterbeast ===
- Feast (2018)

=== Battlecross ===
- Rise to Power (2015)

=== Arkaik ===
- Metamorphignition (2012)
