= Ron Anderson (voice coach) =

American vocal coach and opera singer (1946–2021)

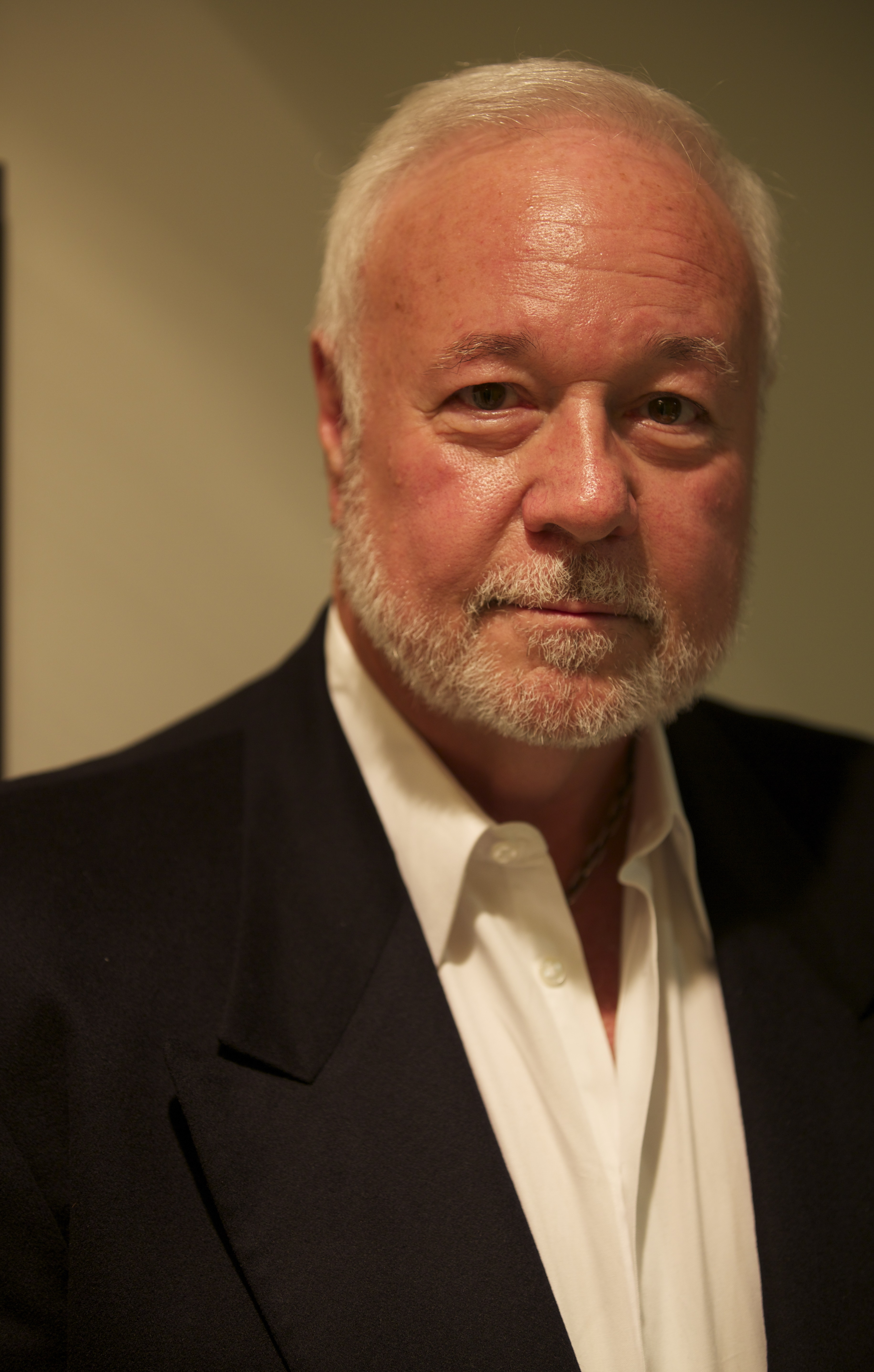
- Anderson in 2013

Background information
- Born: Ronald Warren Anderson; February 4, 1946; Honolulu, Hawaii, U.S.
- Died: December 18, 2021 (aged 75)
- Occupation: Voice coach
- Years active: 1977–2021

Ronald Warren Anderson (February 4, 1946 – December 19, 2021) was an American vocal coach and opera singer, best known for coaching many famous singers in a wide variety of musical genres from rock and metal to R&B and mainstream pop.

== Early life ==
After his family moved to Long Beach, California, at the age of 7 he started performing on a local radio program. Anderson performed in a number of local choirs, as well as singing with Roger Wagner Chorale and The Young Americans.

While singing with The Young Americans, Anderson damaged his voice. Throat specialists determined that the only chance to heal his voice was to avoid all vocal production, no singing, no talking for an indefinite time. After living in total isolation for eight months, he was pronounced healed by his doctors. He decided to be a professional singer but needed to learn how to sing safely. Anderson started looking for voice teachers, which led him to Fritz and Tilly de Garmo Zweig.

== Education ==
Soon after Anderson began working with Mrs. Zweig as his voice teacher, Anderson decided that his voice was best suited for opera. According to Anderson:

Mrs. Zweig taught me the mechanics of vocalization and the fundamentals of breath management, vocal placement, vowel modification and diction. She also taught me German, French, and Italian, which are essential languages for every professional opera singer.

She also taught Anderson how to recover from the damage in his vocal cords and rebuild his ability to sing. After Mrs. Zweig determined he could sing safely, he began working with Dr. Zweig as well. For 20 years, he continued to study with both.

== Teaching ==
In 1977 when Anderson returned to the U.S., he began as a vocal coach specializing in Bel canto technique,

Rock vocalist Tom Keifer went to Anderson in 2009 after several vocal chord surgeries to improve his condition; he credited Anderson with helping him regain strength and confidence in his voice.

In 2012 Anderson prepared Tom Cruise for his role as Stacee Jaxx in the musical film Rock of Ages.

In 2014 metal vocalist Matt Heafy took vocal lessons from Anderson following advice from M. Shadows of Avenged Sevenfold, after Anderson taught Shadows techniques which allowed a more melodic style for the album Silence in the Snow.

Anderson has been a vocal coach to many other popular singers and members of rock groups. Anderson has also taught many students in the film industry as a vocal coach.

Regarding Axl Rose of Guns N' Roses, he said: "I’ve worked with so many people but I have to say Axl Rose’s voice is amazing, truly one of a kind."

Some of his clients included Axl Rose, Chris Cornell, M. Shadows, Myles Kennedy, Ozzy Osbourne, Matt Heafy, Seal, Alicia Keys, Tom Cruise, Mary J. Blige, Lenny Kravitz, Neil Diamond, Adele, The Weeknd, Joss Stone, Red Hot Chili Peppers, Tom Keifer, Hayley Williams, Christina Perri, Lzzy Hale, Janet Jackson, Avril Lavigne, Timothy B. Schmit, Nancy Wilson, Diego Boneta, Five for Fighting, and Björk.

== Personal life and death ==
Anderson died on the morning of December 19, 2021, at the age of 75. Many musicians including Axl Rose and Tom Keifer paid a tribute to him.

== Film credits ==
Year	Title
2000	Dancer in the Dark.
2000	Coyote Ugly
2001	Rock Star
2007	Lucky You
2009	Nine
2010	The Runaways
2010	Get Him to the Greek
2012	Rock of Ages
2014	Get on Up
