= Frozen Soul =

American metal band

- Origin: Fort Worth, Texas
- Genre: Death metal
- Years active: 2018–present
- Label: Century Media
- Members: Chad Green; Michael Munday; Samantha Mobley; Matt Dennard; Chris Bonner
- Past members: Brady Trip; Daniel Schmuck; Raymond Macdonald
- Website: www.frozensoultx.com

Frozen Soul is an American death metal band from Fort Worth, Texas, founded in 2018.

== History ==
Founded in 2018, they released their debut EP, Encased in Ice, the following year, and their debut album, Crypt of Ice, in 2021. In May 2023, they released their second album, Glacial Domination, which received praise for its blending of traditional death metal and hardcore. Matt Heafy of Trivium produced the album.

The band performed at the Sonic Temple music festival in Columbus, Ohio, in May 2025.

== Members ==
=== Current ===
- Chad Green – vocals (2018–present)
- Michael Munday – rhythm guitar (2018–present)
- Samantha Mobley – bass (2018–present)
- Matt Dennard – drums (2019–present)
- Chris Bonner – lead guitar (2020–present)

=== Past ===
- Brady Trip – drums (2018–2019)
- Daniel Schmuck – lead guitar (2018–2019)
- Raymond Macdonald – lead guitar (2019–2020)

== Discography ==
=== Albums ===
- Crypt of Ice (2021)
- Glacial Domination (2023)
- No Place of Warmth (2026)

=== EPs ===
- Encased in Ice (2019)
