= Pull Harder on the Strings of Your Martyr =

Single by Trivium

from the album Ascendancy
- Released: March 2005
- Genre: Metalcore
- Length: 4:51
- Label: Roadrunner
- Songwriters: Matt Heafy; Corey Beaulieu; Jason Suecof; Travis Smith
- Producer: Jason Suecof

Trivium singles chronology
"Like Light to the Flies" (2005)	"Pull Harder on the Strings of Your Martyr" (2005)	"A Gunshot to the Head of Trepidation" (2005)

"Pull Harder on the Strings of Your Martyr" (often shortened to "Pull Harder" or simply "Martyr") is a song by American heavy metal band Trivium. It appears on their 2005 album Ascendancy and was released as the album's second single in the same year. Metal Hammer named it "one of the decade’s biggest metal anthems".

== Live performance ==
This song used to be played as the last song in a Trivium live set, however, since 2011, they have finished with either the Shogun single "Throes of Perdition" or "In Waves" from the album of the same name. During the Ascendancy tours, the song's verse was screamed, but for a short stint of the tours after The Crusade, the song was sung live in a raspy clean voice as opposed to the recorded version. Since the release of Shogun, the song has returned to its original vocals when performed live.

At the Roadrunner United 25th anniversary concert back in December 2005, Trivium performed this song live with Machine Head's Robb Flynn on vocals. That concert was released as a DVD called The All-Star Sessions, along with a documentary.

== Meaning ==
Vocalist and songwriter Matt Heafy has described that "Pull Harder on the Strings of Your Martyr" "is a look at a villainous tyrant; one who can simply kill and destroy on will, push his faith upon all, be hated by all other powers around - and still be loved by many that he rules."

== Usage in media ==
- The song is featured on the soundtrack for the 2005 movie, The Cave.

== Track listing ==
No.	Title	Length
1.	"Pull Harder on the Strings of Your Martyr" (Album Version)	4:51
2.	"Pull Harder on the Strings of Your Martyr" (radio edit)	4:21

== Personnel ==
- Matt Heafy – lead vocals, guitars
- Corey Beaulieu – guitars, backing vocals
- Paolo Gregoletto – bass guitar, backing vocals
- Travis Smith – drums, percussion

Additional personnel

- Jason Suecof – guitar solo
