= Built to Fall =

Single by Trivium

from the album In Waves
- Released: August 16, 2011
- Recorded: 2011
- Studio: Paint It Black Studios / Audiohammmer Studios, Florida
- Genre: Melodic metalcore
- Length: 3:08
- Label: Roadrunner
- Songwriters: Paolo Gregoletto; Matt Heafy; Corey Beaulieu
- Producers: Colin Richardson; Martyn "Ginge" Ford

Trivium singles chronology
"In Waves" (2011)	"Built to Fall" (2011)	"Black" (2012)

"Built to Fall" is the second single of American heavy metal band Trivium's fifth studio album, In Waves. This song was released on August 16, 2011. It is the second single to feature drummer Nick Augusto. The album featured a sound closer to Ascendancy than The Crusade and Shogun and features a more metalcore sound than thrash metal. It reached 31 on the UK Rock Chart.

== Music video ==
The song's video was directed by Ramon Boutviseth (Dream Theater, All That Remains) and shows the band separated in a strange "swamp like cave". There is no performance in the video. It is a continuation of a series of videos from where the previous single In Waves left off, like its predecessor the end of the video leaves off with a message stating "To be continued" as the series was planned to continue after this video's release but didn't go ahead for unknown reasons. Along with the rest of the songs from the album a live performance of the song from Chapman Studios was released.

== Personnel ==
- Matt Heafy – lead vocals, rhythm guitar
- Corey Beaulieu – lead guitar, backing vocals
- Paolo Gregoletto – bass, backing vocals
- Nick Augusto – drums, percussion
