= Strife (song) =

Single by Trivium

from the album Vengeance Falls
- Released: August 20, 2013
- Recorded: February–March 2013
- Studio: DMD Productions in Austin, Texas
- Genre: Heavy metal; thrash metal; melodic metalcore
- Length: 4:28
- Label: Roadrunner
- Songwriters: Matt Heafy; Corey Beaulieu; Paolo Gregoletto; Nick Augusto
- Producer: David Draiman

Trivium singles chronology
"Brave This Storm" (2013)	"Strife" (2013)	"Losing My Religion" (2013)

"Strife" is a song by American heavy metal band Trivium. It was released as the second single from the band's sixth studio album Vengeance Falls.

== Background ==
"Strife" made its debut during the band's performance at Wacken Open Air on August 3, 2013. A studio recording of the song was released a few weeks later as a single on August 20.

== Reception ==
Several reviews of Vengeance Falls highlighted "Strife" as the album's top track.

Dan Slessor of Alternative Press called "Strife" a "state-of-the-art metallic anthem." Ridge Briel of New Noise Magazine described the song as "an anthemic Shogun-esque track, with soaring riffs and a thick bass tone that captures Trivium at one of the high points of the album."

=== Commercial ===
"Strife" was a minor hit on American rock radio following its release. The single peaked at no. 24 on the Billboard Mainstream Rock chart on March 15, 2014, the band's highest-charting single at the time; this would be surpassed with "Until the World Goes Cold" from the band's following album Silence in the Snow.

== Track listing ==
CD single

No.	Title	Length
1.	"Strife"	4:28

10" single

No.	Title	Length
1.	"Strife"	4:29

No.	Title	Length
1.	"Brave This Storm"	4:29

== Charts ==
Chart (2013–14)	Peak position
US Billboard Mainstream Rock	24
UK Rock (Official Charts Company)	35

== Personnel ==
- Matt Heafy – lead vocals, guitars
- Corey Beaulieu – guitars, backing vocals
- Paolo Gregoletto – bass, backing vocals
- Nick Augusto – drums
