= Black (Trivium song) =

Single by Trivium

from the album In Waves
- Released: January 23, 2012
- Recorded: 2011
- Studio: Paint It Black Studios / Audiohammer Studios, Florida
- Genre: Melodic metalcore
- Length: 3:26
- Label: Roadrunner
- Songwriters: Matt Heafy; Corey Beaulieu; Paolo Gregoletto; Nick Augusto
- Producers: Colin Richardson; Martyn "Ginge" Ford

Trivium singles chronology
"Built to Fall" (2011)	"Black" (2012)	"Watch the World Burn" (2012)

"Black" is a song by American heavy metal band Trivium. It was released as the third single from the band's fifth studio album In Waves.

No music video was made for the song, but an official lyric video debuted on January 23, 2012 via Noisecreep. It is speculated there was to be a music video which would continue the series where the "Built to Fall" music video left off which for unknown reasons did not continue and there would be a standalone music video for "Watch the World Burn" released on November 16, 2012. The song peaked at no. 40 on the Billboard Mainstream Rock Chart on May 11, the band's first charting single on that chart since "The Rising" from 2007.

== Track listing ==
No.	Title	Length
1.	"Black" (Radio Edit)	3:20
2.	"Black" (Album Version)	3:26

== Charts ==
Chart (2012)	Peak position
US Billboard Mainstream Rock	40
US Billboard Active Rock	35

== Personnel ==
- Matt Heafy – lead vocals, rhythm guitar
- Corey Beaulieu – lead guitar, backing vocals
- Paolo Gregoletto – bass guitar, backing vocals
- Nick Augusto – drums
