= List of B.C. Rich guitars =

- Assassin/ASM
- Avenge and WMD SOB or Son Of Beast (Beast shape scaled down 10%)
- Beast (Designed by Brian Hoffman of Deicide in 1999)
- Big (Daddy) Beast (8 string Beast. Concept of James Siler and Heath Williamson; only one was ever built) Actual concept came from 7 string Guitarist Simon "Vk" and guitar tech David Owen originally from Lofat, original guitar was to be 27" scale, but BC RICH built it at 25.5 so the instrument was declined.
- BEAG2
- Beast V (Kerry King designed; front half of the Beast model, back half of the Speed V/KKV)
- Rich Bich (Designed by Neal Moser in 1977)
- 25th Anniversary Rich Bich 10 string prototype reissue. (BC Rich/Moser PMS) Only 15 units were ever produced.
- Blaster (similar to a Telecaster)
- Condor (Eagle Archtop)
- Conti (Robert Conti signature)
- Dagger (Designed by Rock Clouser)
- Big Dagger (Dagger with a Bigsby vibrato)
- Death'r
- The Deceiver
- Draco
- DNB (Double-Neck Bich 6 & 12 strings - popularized by Lita Ford)
- Eagle (designed by Bernardo Chavez Rico and Neal Moser in 1976)
- Eagle Archtop (An upscale Eagle with a 1-inch-thick (25 mm) carved flamed maple top and mahogany body)
- Exclusive
- Fat Bob (Body in the shape of a Harley gas tank)
- Gunslinger (designed by Dan Lawrence/Glen Matezel in 1987)
- Havoc (John Moyer's signature bass. Originally manufactured by Traben Bass Company.)
- Hydra
- Ignitor
- Innovator
- Ironbird (designed by Joey Rico in 1983)
- Jazzbox (Hollow-body)
- Jinxx Pro X Bich
- Jr. V
- KKV/Speed V (Kerry King Signature V)
- KKW (Kerry King Signature Warlock)
- MAG
- Marion
- Meegs
- Mockingbird (designed by Johnny "Go Go" Kallas in 1975, Whittier Plaza Music, Ca, USA) (Special Edition made in Korea)
- Mockingbird II
- Nighthawk
- Outlaw
- Punisher (Popularized by Gene Simmons)
- Seagull (designed by Bernardo Chavez Rico in 1972)
- Seagull II (Also known as Seagull Jr. designed by Bernardo Chavez Rico and Neal Moser in 1975)
- SHREDZILLA (Designed In 2019)
- Son Of A Rich
- Stealth (designed by Rick Derringer in 1983)
- ST
- ST III (designed by Dave Williams/Ross Jennings in 1985)
- Thunderbird (Gibson copy)
- Thunderbolt
- TS-100 (Similar to a Telecaster)
- TS-200 (Similar to a Telecaster)
- Virgin (Designed by Neal Moser in 1990)
- Virgo (Designed by Rock Clouser)
- Warpig (Similar to a Gibson SG)
- Warlock (designed by Spencer Sarcombe and Bernardo Chavez Rico in 1981)
- Warlock II
- Warbeast (Combination of the Beast and Warlock)
- Wave (designed by Martyn Evans in 1981)
- Widow (Designed by Blackie Lawless of the metal band W.A.S.P. in 1983)
- Wrath
- Zoltan (5fdp)
- Zombie
