= In Waves =

In Waves may refer to:

- In Waves (Trivium album), 2011
  - In Waves (song), by Trivium
- In Waves (Jamie xx album), 2024
- In Waves, a 2015 album by Sarah Blacker
- In Waves, a 2019 graphic novel by AJ Dungo
  - In Waves, a 2026 animated film by Phuong Mai Nguyen based on the novel
