= KKV =

KKV may refer to:

- KKV (Kim Vadenhag), member of Swedish hip hop duo Norlie & KKV
- KKV guitar, an electric guitar
- King, Keohane & Verba, the authors of 'Designing Social Inquiry'
- Kinetic kill vehicle, a kinetic projectile
- Kirkelig Kulturverksted, a Norwegian record label
- Konkurrensverket, the Swedish Competition Authority
- KKV, fictional villain portrayed by Nirmal Pandey in the 2001 Indian film One 2 Ka 4
