= Anthem (We Are the Fire) =

Single by Trivium

from the album The Crusade
- Released: October 2, 2006
- Studio: Audiohammer Studios, Sanford, Florida
- Genre: Thrash metal
- Length: 4:02
- Label: Roadrunner
- Songwriters: Matt Heafy; Paolo Gregoletto
- Producers: Jason Suecof; Matt Heafy; Corey Beaulieu; Paolo Gregoletto; Travis Smith

Trivium singles chronology
"Entrance of the Conflagration" (2006)	"Anthem (We Are the Fire)" (2006)	"The Rising" (2007)

"Anthem (We Are the Fire)" is a song by American heavy metal band Trivium. The song was released as the third single from the band's third studio album The Crusade. The single failed to chart in the United States, but was a moderate success in the United Kingdom, reaching number 40 on the UK Singles Chart and number 1 on the UK Rock Chart.

The song was written by lead vocalist/rhythm guitarist Matt Heafy and bassist/backing vocalist Paolo Gregoletto. It can be heard on the radio station Krunch 106.66 in the video game Saints Row 2.

== Music video ==
The song's music video was directed by Nathan Cox.

The video begins with shots of people at a party at a mansion. The band members arrive at the mansion and walk through it to the backyard, where they start to perform the song. Fans suddenly show up at the mansion and rush to the band perform, with the party goers looking on in confusion. The video continues with the fans watching the band perform.

== Track listing ==
Enhanced single

No.	Title	Length
1.	"Anthem (We Are the Fire)"	4:02
2.	"Vengeance"	3:34
3.	"Broken One"	5:49
4.	"Anthem (We Are the Fire)" (Music Video)	4:13

Promo single

No.	Title	Length
1.	"Anthem (We Are the Fire)" (Clean Edit)	3:40
2.	"Anthem (We Are the Fire)" (Edit)	3:40
3.	"Anthem (We Are the Fire)" (Album Version)	4:02

== Personnel ==
Trivium

- Matt Heafy – lead vocals, guitar
- Corey Beaulieu – guitar, backing vocals
- Paolo Gregoletto – bass, backing vocals
- Travis Smith – drums

== Charts ==
Chart (2006)	Peak position
Scotland (OCC)	22
UK Singles (OCC)	40
UK Rock & Metal (OCC)	1

== See also ==
- List of UK Rock & Metal Singles Chart number ones of 2006
