= A Gunshot to the Head of Trepidation =

Single by Trivium

from the album Ascendancy
- Released: May 2005
- Genre: Metalcore
- Length: 5:55 (album version); 4:31 (edited version)
- Label: Roadrunner
- Songwriters: Matt Heafy; Corey Beaulieu
- Producers: Jason Suecof; Matt Heafy

Trivium singles chronology
"Pull Harder on the Strings of Your Martyr" (2005)	"A Gunshot to the Head of Trepidation" (2005)	"Dying in Your Arms" (2005)

"A Gunshot to the Head of Trepidation", often referred to as "Gunshot", is a song by American heavy metal band Trivium. Written by Matt Heafy and Corey Beaulieu, both of whom perform vocals and guitars on the track, it was featured on the band's second studio album Ascendancy in 2005. The song was also released as a promotional single in May 2005, with an accompanying music video following in September.

== Composition and lyrics ==
According to Trivium frontman Matt Heafy, who wrote the lyrics for the song and co-wrote the music with guitarist and backing vocalist Corey Beaulieu, "A Gunshot to the Head of Trepidation" is written from the point of view of a child who is either a victim of child abuse or a witness to domestic violence, and is described by the vocalist and guitarist as "the punching bag for the underdog". Speaking in a track-by-track commentary of the album released on Spotify in 2015, Heafy explained that "the outcome of the story of this song was that someone was able to create something out of [being abused]", and that it means "putting that terror away ... by allowing yourself to grow from it and learn from it and not harm yourself or anyone around you negatively from it".

Heafy began writing the song in Las Vegas, Nevada during the band's second concert tour, noting that he played the riff for drummer Travis Smith while the two were "drunk and fucked up", who then added the preliminary drum parts by "playing something on the floor". The gang vocals during the later stages of the song were recorded while the album was being mixed at Andy Sneap's Backstage Studios in Ripley, Derbyshire. They were performed by Heafy, Smith, Sneap, Chad Sunderland and Gizz Butt.

== Promotion and release ==
Following its inclusion on Ascendancy in March 2005, "A Gunshot to the Head of Trepidation" was released as a promotional single in May 2005 featuring an edited version of the track. The song was included on the 2005 Ozzfest Summer Sampler CD, before the band's performance of the track at the festival was included on the Ozzfest 10th Anniversary live video album released later in the year.

== Music video ==
The music video for "A Gunshot to the Head of Trepidation" was filmed in Orlando, Florida on June 21, 2005. Directed by Shane Drake, the video featured a crowd made up of 300 of the band's fans, who were recruited the previous week. It was premiered in September 2005.

== Critical reception ==
Vik Bansal of musicOMH praised the song for featuring a "burst of melodic backing vocals", as well as "the unexpected but effective" gang vocal section near the end of the track. PopMatters writer Cosmo Lee likened the song's use of guitar harmonies to those performed by James Hetfield and Kirk Hammett on Metallica's 1988 fourth studio album ...And Justice for All, while AllMusic's Johnny Loftus highlighted bassist Paolo Gregoletto's performance on the track.

== Personnel ==
- Matt Heafy – lead vocals, guitars, gang vocals, production
- Corey Beaulieu – guitars, backing vocals, gang vocals
- Paolo Gregoletto – bass, backing vocals, gang vocals
- Travis Smith – drums, percussion, gang vocals
- Jason Suecof – production, engineering
- Andy Sneap – mixing, mastering, gang vocals
- Chad Sunderland – gang vocals
- Gizz Butt – gang vocals
