= Silence in the Snow =

Studio album by Trivium
- Released: October 2, 2015
- Studio: Studio Barbarossa, Orlando, Florida; Clear Track Studios, Clearwater, Florida
- Genre: Heavy metal; hard rock
- Length: 43:12; 52:59 (special edition)
- Label: Roadrunner
- Producer: Michael "Elvis" Baskette

Trivium studio album chronology
Vengeance Falls (2013)	Silence in the Snow (2015)	The Sin and the Sentence (2017)

Singles from Silence in the Snow
- 1. "Silence in the Snow" Released: July 30, 2015; 2. "Blind Leading the Blind" Released: August 13, 2015; 3. "Until the World Goes Cold" Released: August 26, 2015; 4. "Dead and Gone" Released: March 10, 2016

Silence in the Snow is the seventh studio album by American heavy metal band Trivium. Released on October 2, 2015, through Roadrunner Records, it is the band's only album to feature third drummer Mat Madiro, who joined the band in May 2014 and departed in December 2015. It is also the band's only album to date to not feature any harsh vocals. Michael "Elvis" Baskette was hired as the producer whom the band had met while recording In Waves album back in 2011.

The band premiered "Silence in the Snow" and "Blind Leading the Blind" on their headlining performance on Bloodstock Open Air. "Blind Leading the Blind" was later released as a single on YouTube August 13, 2015. On August 21, 2015, a music video was released on YouTube for "Blind Leading the Blind".

The third single "Until the World Goes Cold" premiered on Octane on August 26, 2015. The music video premiered on YouTube the day after. The single landed on No. 10 at Top 10 Active Rock chart in February 2016, making it first ever Trivium single in the Top 10.

On September 25, 2015, a week prior the worldwide release, the entire album (including two bonus tracks) was officially streamed on Octane. Heafy, Beaulieu and Gregoletto were also participating in the radio program, breaking down the meaning of songs and commenting on the songwriting process.

The fourth single "Dead and Gone" was released with its music video on March 10, 2016.

== Composition ==
=== Influences, style and themes ===
Guitarist Corey Beaulieu cites Rainbow, Black Sabbath and Dio as the main influences for the album, as well as touring experience with Heaven & Hell back in 2007. He said the title song was written during Shogun sessions but was eventually cut from the final release, as the band thought it did not fit "Shogun's sound".

During the album's making, vocalist Matt Heafy worked with vocal coach Ron Anderson in order to improve his voice which he blew in 2014. The result of his training is a more melodic, clean singing style, making Silence in the Snow the first Trivium album not to feature any kind of unclean vocals at all.

Silence in the Snow marks the return of 7-string guitars, which have been previously used in The Crusade and Shogun.

AllMusic says that with Silence in the Snow, Trivium has completed their move towards arena rock, that they used the "building blocks of metal" to create a more popular sound.

== Critical reception ==
Professional ratings
Aggregate scores
Source	Rating
Metacritic	80/100
Review scores
Source	Rating
AllMusic	3.5/5 stars
Classic Rock	3.5/5 stars
Exclaim!	5/10
The Guardian	4/5 stars
Kerrang!	4/5 stars
New Noise Magazine	4/5 stars
PopMatters	7/10 stars
Ultimate Guitar	8/10

Upon its release, Silence in the Snow received generally positive reviews from critics. Review aggregator Metacritic gave the album an 80 out of 100 based on five reviews from professional critics. The Guardian stated: "If they continue down this path, Silence might be remembered as the moment Trivium secured their status as modern metal greats."

== Commercial performance ==
The album debuted at No. 3 on Billboard's Top Rock Albums chart, selling 17,000 copies in its first week.

== Track listing ==
All tracks are written by Trivium, except "Snøfall" by Ihsahn.

Standard edition
No.	Title	Length
1.	"Snøfall" (instrumental)	1:28
2.	"Silence in the Snow"	3:40
3.	"Blind Leading the Blind"	4:25
4.	"Dead and Gone"	3:46
5.	"The Ghost That's Haunting You"	4:09
6.	"Pull Me from the Void"	3:53
7.	"Until the World Goes Cold"	5:21
8.	"Rise Above the Tides"	3:54
9.	"The Thing That's Killing Me"	3:30
10.	"Beneath the Sun"	3:56
11.	"Breathe in the Flames"	5:10
Total length:		43:12

Special edition
No.	Title	Length
12.	"Cease All Your Fire"	5:01
13.	"The Darkness of My Mind"	4:46
Total length:		52:59

== Personnel ==
Trivium

- Matt Heafy – lead vocals, guitars
- Corey Beaulieu – guitars
- Paolo Gregoletto – bass, backing vocals
- Mat Madiro – drums, percussion

Production and additional musicians

- Michael Baskette – producer
- Josh Wilbur – mixing
- Ihsahn – composer on "Snøfall"
- Brad Blackwood – mastering

== Charts ==
Chart (2015)	Peak position
Australian Albums (ARIA)	7
Austrian Albums (Ö3 Austria)	11
Belgian Albums (Ultratop Flanders)	58
Belgian Albums (Ultratop Wallonia)	63
Canadian Albums (Billboard)	8
Dutch Albums (Album Top 100)	80
Finnish Albums (Suomen virallinen lista)	16
French Albums (SNEP)	81
German Albums (Offizielle Top 100)	13
Irish Albums (IRMA)	33
New Zealand Albums (RMNZ)	21
Scottish Albums (OCC)	16
Spanish Albums (Promusicae)	92
Swiss Albums (Schweizer Hitparade)	19
UK Albums (OCC)	19
UK Rock & Metal Albums (OCC)	3
US Billboard 200	19
US Top Hard Rock Albums (Billboard)	3
US Top Rock Albums (Billboard)	3
