= Like Light to the Flies =

2005 single by Trivium

Single by Trivium

from the album Ascendancy
- Released: January 2005
- Genre: Melodic metalcore
- Length: 5:40 (album version); 4:02 (single version)
- Label: Roadrunner Records
- Songwriters: Matt Heafy, Corey Beaulieu
- Producer: Jason Suecof

Trivium singles chronology
"Like Light to the Flies" (2005)	"Pull Harder on the Strings of Your Martyr" (2005)

"Like Light to the Flies" (or "Like Light", as it is often referred to) is a song by American heavy metal band Trivium and is the first single and music video from their 2005 album, Ascendancy. The band originally considered using the song "Ember to Inferno" as their first single but changed their minds after recording this song (along with "Blinding Tears Will Break the Skies" and "The Deceived"). "Like Light" was released in January 2005 and features a mix of screaming and singing. The song contains two guitar solos which are played nearly consecutively to sound as one longer solo; a small interlude is played in the middle of them. The music video features original member Brent Young, and the version of the song used in the video is not the album version but rather the demo version, found previously on the MTV compilation album MTV2 Headbanger's Ball: Volume 2.

== Composition and lyrics ==
The song's chorus has drawn comparisons to Avenged Sevenfold during the Waking the Fallen era. The track contains a guitar solo.

Singer Matt Heafy said of the song's meaning: "This song is about people's attraction to all forms of tragedy. It seems like everywhere you turn to today (e.g., television, newspaper, magazine, movies, etc.) it's all about murder, violence, war, cruelty- and it's because this is what sells; people are totally captivated by subjects in this vein. We are the flies."

== Track listing ==
No.	Title	Length
1.	"Like Light to the Flies"	5:40

== Personnel ==
- Matt Heafy – lead vocals, guitars
- Corey Beaulieu – guitars, backing vocals
- Brent Young – bass, backing vocals (single version)
- Paolo Gregoletto – bass, backing vocals (album version)
- Travis Smith – drums, percussion

== Trivia ==
- The video can be found on Roadrunner Records.
- The bassist in the video is Brent Young; Paolo Gregoletto joined the band shortly after its release.
- The song is heard in the 2007 film Smokin' Aces.
- The song is also heard in the video game The Sims 2, in Simlish, and was featured in the 2005 video game Tom Clancy's Rainbow Six: Lockdown.

== See also ==
Vicarious – a song by the band Tool with lyrics on the same topic.
