= Until the World Goes Cold =

Single by Trivium

from the album Silence in the Snow
- Released: August 26, 2015
- Genre: Heavy metal; hard rock
- Length: 5:21
- Label: Roadrunner
- Songwriters: Matt Heafy; Corey Beaulieu; Paolo Gregoletto; Mat Madiro
- Producer: Michael "Elvis" Baskette

Trivium singles chronology
"Blind Leading the Blind" (2015)	"Until the World Goes Cold" (2015)	"Dead and Gone" (2016)

"Until the World Goes Cold" is a song by American heavy metal band Trivium, appearing on the band's seventh studio album, Silence in the Snow. The song was released as the album's third single on August 26, 2015.

Following its release, "Until the World Goes Cold" peaked at number 10 on the Billboard Mainstream Rock chart, Trivium's highest-charting single to date.

== Reception ==
Vince Neilstein of Metal Sucks reacted positively to the song and noted its commercial potential. Neilstein called the song catchy and well-written, but criticized the use of auto-tune. In his review for Silence in the Snow, AllMusic reviewer Thom Jurek selected "Until the World Goes Cold" as an AllMusic reviewer's pick.

== Music video ==
The song's music video premiered on August 27. Similar to the band's previous video, "Silence in the Snow," the video for "Until the World Goes Cold" is shot in black and white. The video features shots of the band performing inter-cut with footage of a man who finds the mask from Silence in the Snow's cover.

== Charts ==
Chart (2015–16)	Peak position
US Billboard Mainstream Rock	10
US Billboard Rock Airplay	34

== Personnel ==
Trivium

- Matt Heafy – lead vocals, rhythm guitar
- Corey Beaulieu – lead guitar
- Paolo Gregoletto – bass, backing vocals
- Mat Madiro – drums
