= Vengeance Falls =

Studio album by Trivium
- Released: October 10, 2013
- Recorded: February–March 2013
- Studio: DMD Productions, Austin, Texas
- Genre: Thrash metal; heavy metal; melodic metalcore
- Length: 47:47
- Label: Roadrunner
- Producer: David Draiman

Trivium studio album chronology
| In Waves (2011) | Vengeance Falls (2013) | Silence in the Snow (2015) |

Singles from Vengeance Falls
- 1. "Brave This Storm" Released: July 31, 2013; 2. "Strife" Released: August 20, 2013; 3. "Through Blood and Dirt and Bone" Released: July 18, 2014; 4. "Villainy Thrives" Released: August 6, 2014

Vengeance Falls is the sixth studio album by American heavy metal band Trivium. It was released October 10, 2013, in Japan, October 14, 2013, in UK, and October 15, 2013, in US through Roadrunner Records and was produced by David Draiman, the lead vocalist of the band Disturbed. It is the second and last album to feature drummer Nick Augusto before his departure from the band in May 2014.

== Background ==
In January 2013, bassist Paolo Gregoletto posted photos of the band working on their next studio release. In one of the pictures, vocalist Matt Heafy was sitting next to David Draiman of Disturbed; leading to some speculation that he would play a part in the album's conception. It was later confirmed via Gregoletto's Facebook that Draiman would in fact be the producer.

In an interview with Thrash Hits, Draiman revealed that the album's title was Vengeance Falls. Matt Heafy in particular was satisfied with Draiman's work on the album, calling him the "most hands-on producer" they've ever worked with. He went on to say that "Draiman helped me gain another four to six notes in my upper vocal range, which is something I never thought was possible ... He helped with every instrument, every song, helping create melodies – his ability to create melody is one of the most staggering things I've ever seen."

== Release and promotion ==
The band performed the song "Brave This Storm" live on July 28, 2013 at Rock the City Bucharest in Romania and released the studio version three days later as a free digital download. Gregoletto stated in an interview that this song was just a teaser and the new album's first single was "Strife".

"Strife" was performed live for the first time on August 1, 2013 at the Resurrection Fest at Viveiro in Spain and it's available to stream via YouTube. Vengeance Falls became available for pre-order at their official website on August 20. The first single was available as an instant download with all pre-orders. Buyers would receive a digital copy of the album, downloadable on the day of release. "No Way to Heal" was released on September 30, the third song to be streamed.

On October 10, 2023, for the 10-year anniversary, a remastered edition of Vengeance Falls was released.

== Critical reception ==
Professional ratings
Aggregate scores
| Source | Rating |
|---|---|
| Metacritic | 74/100 |
Review scores
| Source | Rating |
| About.com | 4/5 stars |
| AllMusic | 4/5 stars |
| Alternative Press | 3.5/5 stars |
| Classic Rock Magazine | 7/10 stars |
| The Guardian | 4/5 stars |
| Metal Hammer | 8/10 stars |
| New Noise Magazine | 4.5/5 stars |
| Premier Guitar | 4/5 stars |
| Rock Sound | 8/10 stars |
| Sputnikmusic | 3/5 stars |

Vengeance Falls has received mostly positive reviews from professional critics, but has proven controversial among die-hard fans, mostly because of the decision of hiring David Draiman as a producer. The Guardian stated "This is a proud and focused heavy metal album that eschews current trends in favour of great songs, massive grooves, blazing lead breaks and a disarming air of combative euphoria". Another positive review came from AllMusic, when Gregory Heaney commented "With a songwriting that emphasizes quality over quantity or complexity, the album feels more precise in its execution, with every moment expertly placed in order to serve the songs rather than show off the band's musicianship (which is, as always, considerable)".

One of the most recognized songs by the critics is "Strife". New Noise Magazine describes it as "an anthemic Shogun-esque track, with soaring riffs and a thick bass tone that captures Trivium at one of the high points of the album". Other impressive tracks are "Incineration: The Broken World" and "No Way to Heal", which is praised for its tempo changes and guitar solos ("The real kicker though is the intense solo at the end, by far one of the best in their catalogue of over one hundred songs").

A more mixed review came from Sputnikmusic staff reviewer Thompson D. Gerhart, who gave the album a three out of five. "Vengeance Falls is an album with utility." and also stated "You must try to understand: Trivium really are the next Metallica, for better or worse."

== Commercial performance ==
The album debuted at No. 15 on the Billboard 200 albums chart on its release, selling 15,000 copies in the United States in its first week. It also debuted at No. 6 on Billboard's Top Rock Albums, and No. 2 on Hard Rock Albums. The album has sold 69,000 copies in the United States as of September 2015.

== Track listing ==
All tracks are written by Trivium, except where noted.

Standard edition
| No. | Title | Length |
|---|---|---|
| 1. | "Brave This Storm" | 4:29 |
| 2. | "Vengeance Falls" | 4:13 |
| 3. | "Strife" | 4:29 |
| 4. | "No Way to Heal" | 4:05 |
| 5. | "To Believe" | 4:32 |
| 6. | "At the End of This War" | 4:47 |
| 7. | "Through Blood and Dirt and Bone" | 4:26 |
| 8. | "Villainy Thrives" | 4:54 |
| 9. | "Incineration: The Broken World" | 5:52 |
| 10. | "Wake (The End Is Nigh)" | 6:00 |
| Total length: | | 47:47 |

Special edition
| No. | Title | Length |
|---|---|---|
| 11. | "No Hope for the Human Race" | 3:59 |
| 12. | "As I Am Exploding" | 5:51 |
| 13. | "Skulls... We Are 138" (Misfits cover; written by Glenn Danzig) | 3:31 |
| Total length: | | 61:08 |

Japanese edition bonus track
| No. | Title | Length |
|---|---|---|
| 14. | "Losing My Religion" (R.E.M. cover; written by Bill Berry, Peter Buck, Mike Mills, and Michael Stipe) | 4:40 |
| Total length: | | 65:43 |

== Personnel ==
Trivium

- Matt Heafy – lead vocals, guitars
- Corey Beaulieu – guitars, backing vocals
- Paolo Gregoletto – bass, backing vocals
- Nick Augusto – drums, percussion

Production and design

- David Draiman – producer
- Andy Sharp and Jeremy Parker – engineering
- Colin Richardson and Carl Bown – mixing at Treehouse Studio Chesterfield, United Kingdom
- Ted Jensen – mastering at Sterling Sound, New York City
- Ashley Heafy – layout
- David Rath – A&R
- Brent Elliott White – artwork
- Travis Shinn – photography

== Charts ==
| Chart (2013) | Peak position |
|---|---|
| Australian Albums (ARIA) | 8 |
| Austrian Albums (Ö3 Austria) | 10 |
| Belgian Albums (Ultratop Flanders) | 57 |
| Belgian Albums (Ultratop Wallonia) | 58 |
| Canadian Albums (Billboard) | 12 |
| Finnish Albums (Suomen virallinen lista) | 11 |
| French Albums (SNEP) | 78 |
| German Albums (Offizielle Top 100) | 10 |
| Hungarian Albums (MAHASZ) | 40 |
| Irish Albums (IRMA) | 39 |
| Japanese Albums (Oricon) | 18 |
| New Zealand Albums (RMNZ) | 25 |
| Scottish Albums (OCC) | 15 |
| Swiss Albums (Schweizer Hitparade) | 27 |
| UK Albums (OCC) | 23 |
| UK Album Downloads (OCC) | 31 |
| UK Rock & Metal Albums (OCC) | 2 |
| US Billboard 200 | 15 |
| US Digital Albums (Billboard) | 18 |
| US Top Hard Rock Albums (Billboard) | 2 |
| US Top Rock Albums (Billboard) | 6 |
| US Indie Store Album Sales (Billboard) | 14 |
