= B.C. Rich Warlock =

Electric and bass guitar

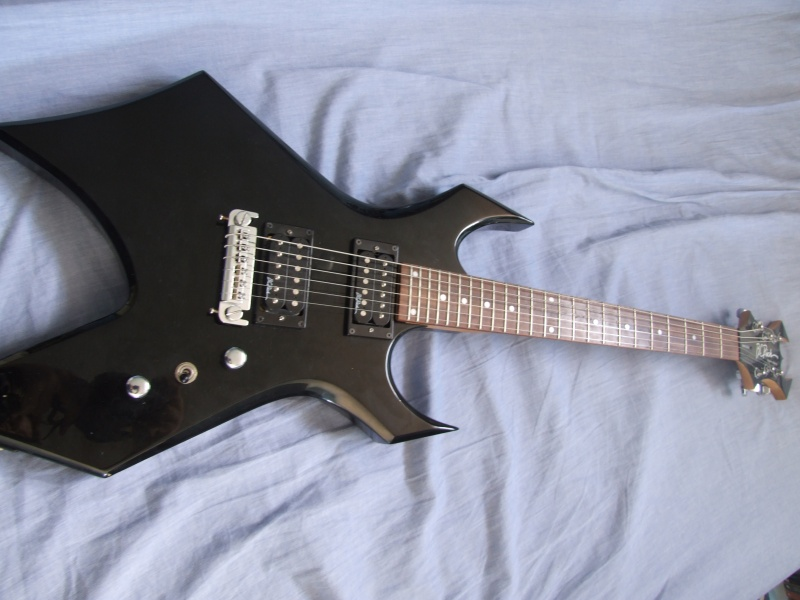
- Manufacturer: B.C. Rich Guitars
- Period: 1981–present

Construction
- Body type: Solid
- Neck joint: Neck-through or bolt-on

Woods
- Body: Mahogany, bass, or maple
- Neck: Maple
- Fretboard: Ebony

Hardware
- Bridge: Fixed or vibrato
- Pickup: 2 DiMarzio humbucker pick-ups

Colors available
- Black, White, Black cherry, Purple, Red

The B.C. Rich Warlock is an electric guitar and bass guitar made by B.C. Rich. It features a distinct jagged shape and two humbucker pickups, and has been associated with the heavy metal scene.

== History ==
The Warlock was designed by company founder Bernardo Chavez Rico in 1969, stating: "This was the only guitar I ever designed at a drafting table, using straight-edges and French curves. It was lots of curves going into straight lines. At first I thought it was the ugliest guitar I'd ever designed." The design wasn't built until local guitarist Spencer Sercombe of Shark Island prompted Rico to do so, but once it was, it soon found favor in the emerging heavy metal scene. "The introduction of the Warlock in 1981 marked the beginning of B.C. Rich's rise to iconic status in heavy metal. [...] The confluence of B.C. Rich's far-out designs and the emerging hair metal culture of the late '70s and early '80s helped cement the brand's place in the market".

The guitar was constructed similarly to other B.C. Rich models such as the Seagull, Eagle, and Mockingbird, with neck-through construction, two DiMarzio humbucker pick-ups, and a Leo Quan Badass bridge. As the guitar was adopted by the heavy metal scene, later models featured Kahler and Floyd Rose vibratos and bolt-on necks.

== Notable users ==
- Saul Hudson (Slash) of Guns N' Roses
- Heaven Pierce Her, music producer of Ultrakill
- Kerry King of Slayer
- Chris Poland of Megadeth
- Chris Kael of Five Finger Death Punch
- Blackie Lawless of W.A.S.P.
- Gelal Necrosodomy of Grand Belials Key and Arghoslent
- Lita Ford
- Max Cavalera of Soulfly, formerly of Sepultura
- Mick Thomson of Slipknot
- Robb Flynn of Machine Head
- Phoebe Bridgers
- C.C. DeVille and Bobby Dall of Poison
- Paolo Gregoletto of Trivium (ex-Metal Militia)
- Paul Stanley of Kiss
- Mick Mars and Nikki Sixx of Mötley Crüe (Shout at the Devil-era)
- Craig Goldy of Dio and Giuffria
- ICS Vortex
- Shakey Graves
- Michael Stützer of Artillery
- Weird Paul Petroskey
- Tripp Eisen, formerly of Static-X, Dope and the Murderdolls
- Joey Jordison (when playing guitar for the Murderdolls)
- Jeordie White (when playing guitar for Marilyn Manson)
- The Seer of Magic Sword
- Terrance Hobbs of Suffocation
- Rhian Teasdale of Wet Leg

== See also ==
- B.C. Rich Mockingbird
