= The Rising (Trivium song) =

Single by Trivium

from the album The Crusade
- Released: April 2007
- Studio: Audiohammer Studios, Sanford, Florida
- Genre: Heavy metal
- Length: 3:43
- Label: Roadrunner
- Songwriters: Matt Heafy; Paolo Gregoletto
- Producers: Jason Suecof; Matt Heafy; Corey Beaulieu; Paolo Gregoletto; Travis Smith

Trivium singles chronology
"Anthem (We Are the Fire)" (2006)	"The Rising" (2007)	"Becoming the Dragon" (2007)

"The Rising" is a song by American heavy metal band Trivium. It was released as the fourth single from the band's third studio album The Crusade. The song was the band's first charting single in the US, peaking at number 32 on the Billboard Mainstream Rock Chart.

== Reception and legacy ==
At the time of The Crusade's release, "The Rising" received positive reviews from critics.

Thom Jurek of AllMusic called "The Rising" one the album's notable tracks, while Don Kaye of Blabbermouth.net called the song one of the best on the album.

In an interview with Metal Injection to coincide with the release of The Sin and the Sentence in 2017, vocalist/guitarist Matt Heafy, guitarist Corey Beaulieu, and bassist Paolo Gregoletto all cited "The Rising" as their least favorite Trivium song. Gregoletto stated that the song was a last minute addition to the album that was written in a style similar to previous single "Anthem (We Are the Fire)" and the inclusion of "The Rising" caused the song "Broken One" to be left off of the album; "Broken One" was released as a b-side to the "Anthem" single and as a bonus track on the iTunes edition of The Crusade. Heafy stated that he felt the song was incomplete and Beaulieu stated the band should not have done the song or should have worked on it some more.

== Music video ==
The song's music video was directed by Artificial Army.

The video primarily consists of shots of the band performing in a warehouse while a woman, a man dressed like a police officer, and another man separately watch the band perform on a TV. As the song's solo begins, the shadows of the three characters act on their own. The woman's shadow is shown arguing with a man, the officer's shadow hints at him serving in a war, while the other man's shadow is shown arguing with itself. As the song ends, the three characters leave the room they are in, with their shadows being sucked into the TV.

== Track listing ==
American promo single

No.	Title	Length
1.	"The Rising"	3:43

European promo single

No.	Title	Length
1.	"The Rising" (Single Version)	3:43
2.	"The Rising" (Album Version)	3:43

== Charts ==
Chart (2007)	Peak position
US Billboard Mainstream Rock	32
US Billboard Active Rock	30

== Personnel ==
- Matt Heafy – lead vocals, rhythm guitar
- Corey Beaulieu – lead guitar
- Paolo Gregoletto – bass, backing vocals
- Travis Smith – drums
