= In Waves (song) =

Single by Trivium

from the album In Waves
- Released: May 21, 2011
- Studio: Paint It Black Studios / Audiohammmer Studios, Florida
- Genre: Melodic metalcore
- Length: 5:02
- Label: Roadrunner
- Songwriters: Matt Heafy; Corey Beaulieu; Paolo Gregoletto
- Producers: Colin Richardson, Martyn "Ginge" Ford

Trivium singles chronology
"Throes of Perdition" (2009)	"In Waves" (2011)	"Built to Fall" (2011)

"In Waves" is the first single from American heavy metal band Trivium's fifth studio album by the same name. This song was released on May 21, 2011. It is the first single to feature drummer Nick Augusto, and it has a different sound than Trivium's previous singles. It reached 31 on the UK Rock Chart.

== Music video ==
The song's video was directed by Ramon Boutviseth (Dream Theater, All That Remains) and shows the band exploring a strange "swamp like" place. There is no performance in the video, and it is extended to seven minutes. It is the first of a series of videos followed by the next single, Built to Fall, from the same album. Along with the rest of the songs from the album, a live performance of the song from Chapman Studios was released.

== Personnel ==
- Matt Heafy – lead vocals, guitars
- Corey Beaulieu – guitars, backing vocals
- Paolo Gregoletto – bass guitar, backing vocals
- Nick Augusto – drums, percussion
