= MTV2 Headbangers Ball, Vol. 2 =

MTV2 Headbangers Ball Volume 2

Compilation album by various artists
- Released: September 28, 2004
- Length: 2:35:04
- Label: Roadrunner

Headbangers Ball chronology
MTV2 Headbangers Ball (2003)	MTV2 Headbangers Ball Volume 2 (2004)	MTV2 Headbangers Ball: The Revenge (2006)

Professional ratings
Review scores
Source	Rating
Allmusic	4/5 stars

MTV2 Headbangers Ball Volume 2 is the second in a series of heavy metal compilation albums released in conjunction with the MTV2 program Headbangers Ball. The 2-disc album continues the theme of featuring mainstream acts on the first disc and brutal, underground styles on the second disc. It won Metal Edge magazine's 2004 Readers' Choice Award for "Compilation Album of the Year."

== Track listing ==
Disc 1
No.	Title	Artist	Length
1.	"Duality"	Slipknot	4:14
2.	"Right Now" (censored)	Korn	3:12
3.	"Rose of Sharyn"	Killswitch Engage	3:37
4.	"Kick the Chair"	Megadeth	3:57
5.	"Right Side of the Bed"	Atreyu	3:42
6.	"Step Up" (censored)	Drowning Pool	3:18
7.	"Weak and Powerless"	A Perfect Circle	3:14
8.	"What Drives the Weak"	Shadows Fall	4:44
9.	"Imperium" (censored)	Machine Head	6:42
10.	"Waiting for the Turning Point" (censored)	Superjoint Ritual	1:27
11.	"Into the Darkness"	Kittie	3:44
12.	"Your Sweet Six Six Six"	HIM	3:58
13.	"Unholy Confessions"	Avenged Sevenfold	4:44
14.	"Laid to Rest" (demo; censored)	Lamb of God	3:48
15.	"Prophecy"	Soulfly	3:09
16.	"House of Doom"	Black Label Society	3:43
17.	"Breathing New Life"	Damageplan	3:50
18.	"The Quiet Place"	In Flames	3:24
19.	"Archetype" (censored)	Fear Factory	4:36
20.	"My Tortured Soul" (live from Headbangers Ball)	Probot	4:53

Disc 2
No.	Title	Artist	Length
1.	"Medusa and Hemlock"	Cradle of Filth	4:46
2.	"The Great Dividers"	Unearth	4:03
3.	"Antihero"	God Forbid	3:57
4.	"We Bury Our Dead at Dawn"	The Agony Scene	3:06
5.	"Needled 24/7" (censored)	Children of Bodom	4:07
6.	"Love Lost in a Hail of Gunfire" (censored)	Bleeding Through	3:46
7.	"Like Light to the Flies" (demo)	Trivium	4:02
8.	"Fuel for Hatred"	Satyricon	3:53
9.	"Rain to the Sound of Panic"	Himsa	3:56
10.	"Deadly Sinners"	3 Inches of Blood	4:30
11.	"Contagion"	The Black Dahlia Murder	3:23
12.	"I Been Gone a Long Time"	Every Time I Die	3:04
13.	"She Speaks to Me"	Blood Has Been Shed	2:34
14.	"Waiting for the Heavens"	Eighteen Visions	3:42
15.	"Scars of the Crucifix"	Deicide	3:08
16.	"The Deepest Gray"	All That Remains	3:09
17.	"Venus Complex"	Twelve Tribes	5:03
18.	"Panasonic Youth"	The Dillinger Escape Plan	2:28
19.	"American Hollow"	Martyr A.D.	3:36
20.	"Progenies of the Great Apocalypse"	Dimmu Borgir	5:19

== Uncensored Version ==
The uncensored version of the album contained the original versions of the censored songs and also contained DevilDriver's "Nothing's Wrong?", instead of Damageplan's "Breathing New Life." It is now no longer in production.
