= KKV guitar =

Electric guitar

B.C. Rich Signature KKV
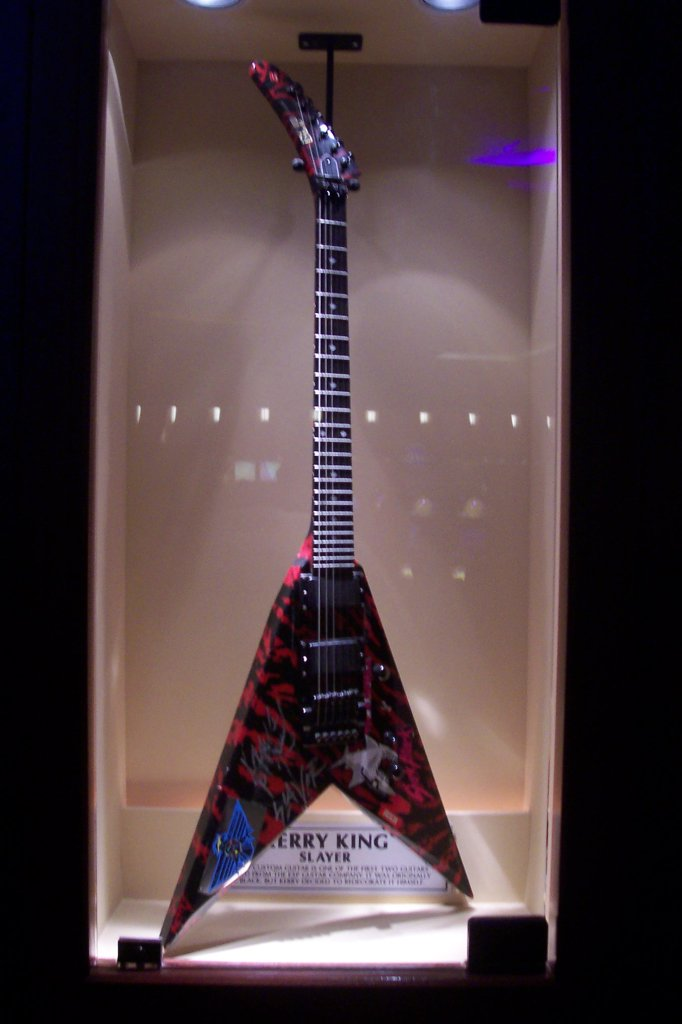
- Manufacturer: B.C. Rich ESP

Construction
- Body type: Flying V with sharp points
- Neck joint: Neck Thru

Woods
- Body: Maple
- Neck: Hard Canadian Maple
- Fretboard: Ebony

Hardware
- Bridge: Kahler Hybrid
- Pickup(s): EMG-81 and EMG-85

Colors available
- black with white tribal design

B.C. Rich KKV
- Manufacturer: B.C. Rich

Construction
- Body type: King V
- Neck joint: Bolt On

Woods
- Body: Basswood
- Neck: Maple
- Fretboard: Rosewood

Hardware
- Bridge: Kahler Hybrid
- Pickup(s): BC Rich BDSM/BCRA

Colors available
- black with white tribal design

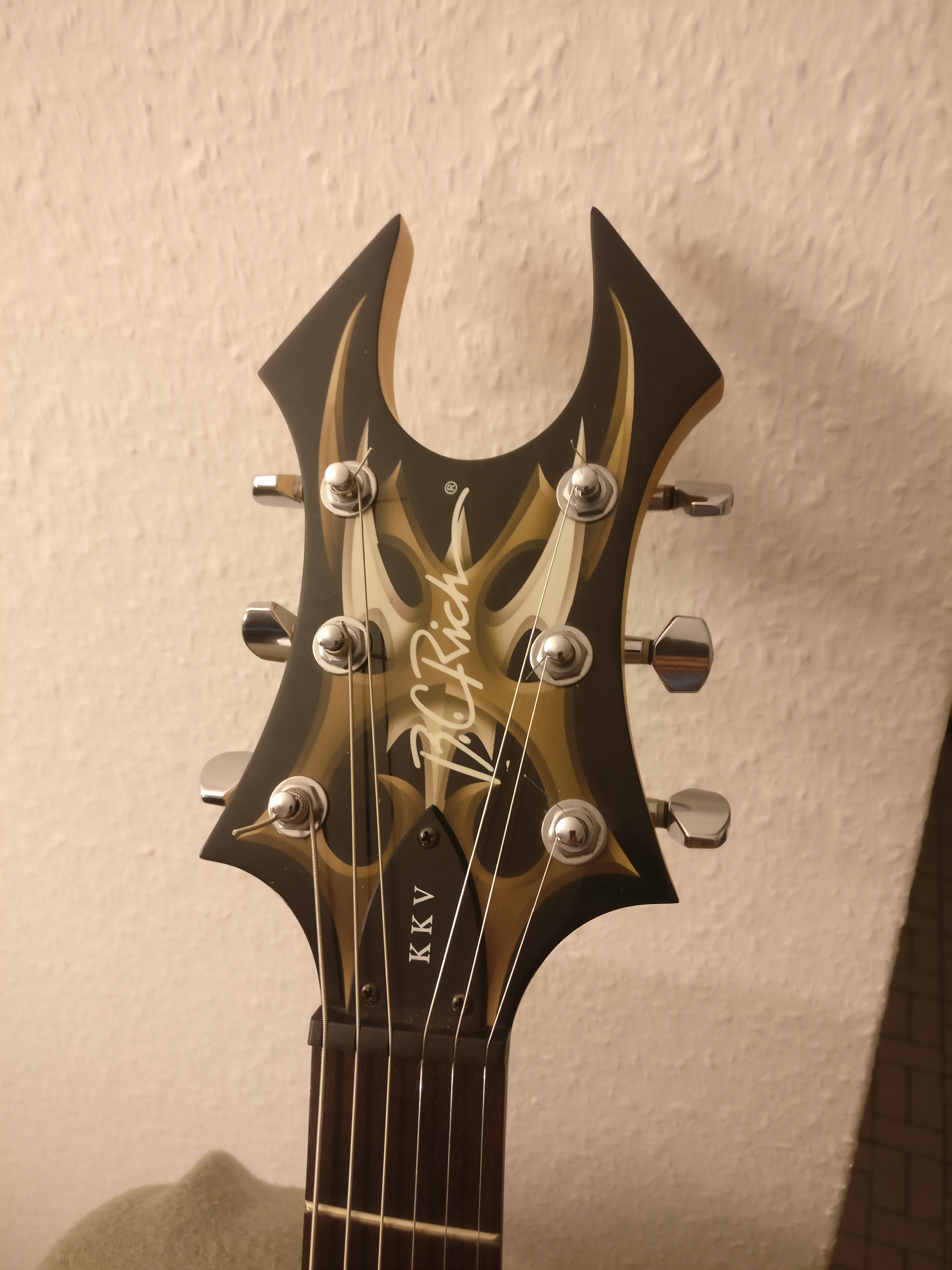
Headstock of 2010 Metal Master KKV guitar

The KKV (Kerry King V), also known as the Speed V, is an electric guitar designed by Kerry King of Slayer for B.C. Rich guitars. Its shape is based on the Gibson Flying V but with sharp points.

B.C. Rich offers different versions of the guitar in four categories; as a signature model from the handcrafted/custom shop division, a high-end signature version, a mid-range version with lower-end pickups, and a low-end Metal Master version without a tremolo. In 2009 B.C. Rich released the Kerry King V2, featuring active pickups, Son Of Beast headstocks and the "generation 2" tribal graphics.

== Non-BC Rich Versions ==
The KKV has not always been exclusive to B.C. Rich. The guitar was briefly made by ESP Guitars when B.C. Rich closed down their custom shop during a period in the 1990s. When the company changed hands and reopened the custom shop, King returned to B.C. Rich.

The ESP model featured a George Lynch style headstock and was finished in black, and black with a red splatter with eagle inlays. (Pictured right as of August 9)

As of 2009, ESP has re-released their version as the NV, with a reverse ESP headstock.

== Features ==
- Basswood body (Signature has a Canadian Maple Body)
- Gloss Black w/KKV Tribal graphics
- Hard Maple Neck
- Bolt on Construction (Neck thru on signature)
- Rosewood Fingerboard with tribal KK inlay on 12th fret (Ebony on signature and V2 models with full inlay on the signature)
- Widow Headstock (Signature and V2 models have tribal designs on the Widow and Son of Beast headstocks respectively)
- 25.5 in (648 mm) Scale (Signature is 24.625 in or 625 mm Scale)
- Black Hardware
- BC Rich Humbuckers Kerry's Signature guitar has EMG Active Pickups [81 and 85] with 20db gain boost)
- Kahler X Tremolo (King uses the 2315 model)
