= Ascendancy (album) =

Studio album by Trivium
- Released: March 15, 2005
- Recorded: September – October 2004
- Studios: Audiohammer (Sanford, Florida); Morrisound Recording (Tampa, Florida)
- Genres: Melodic metalcore; thrash metal
- Length: 55:11; 75:23 (extended version)
- Label: Roadrunner
- Producers: Jason Suecof; Matt Heafy

Trivium studio album chronology
Ember to Inferno (2003)	Ascendancy (2005)	The Crusade (2006)

Singles from Ascendancy
- 1. "Like Light to the Flies" Released: January 2005; 2. "Pull Harder on the Strings of Your Martyr" Released: March 2005; 3. "A Gunshot to the Head of Trepidation" Released: May 2005; 4. "Dying in Your Arms" Released: November 2005

Ascendancy is the second studio album by American heavy metal band Trivium. It was released on March 15, 2005 through Roadrunner Records and was produced by Jason Suecof and Matt Heafy.

== Background ==
This marks the first Trivium album to feature guitarist Corey Beaulieu and bassist Paolo Gregoletto. The album was produced by Jason Suecof and frontman Matt Heafy. The album spawned four singles: "Like Light to the Flies", "Pull Harder on the Strings of Your Martyr", "A Gunshot to the Head of Trepidation" and "Dying in Your Arms". Music videos for each of the songs were shot; a promotional video was filmed for the song "Rain". An earlier version of the video for "Dying in Your Arms" was also filmed (inspired by The Phantom of the Opera), but was scrapped because the band disliked the final product. This version of the video was made available to the public on April 18, 2025.

The music video for "Like Light to the Flies" debuted at MTV2's Headbangers Ball on September 25, 2004 and features the original demo of the song, which was included on the MTV compilation album Headbangers Ball Volume 2. Likewise, demos of songs "The Deceived" and "Blinding Tears Will Break the Skies" were included on the re-release of Trivium's debut album Ember to Inferno, nearly a year before Ascendancy was released.

Speaking to Kerrang! about the songs' lyrics, Matt Heafy said: "Definitely, some of the lyrics are about my personal insecurities and my social issues and disorders, and there's a thing about quietness in the music industry – people assume you're a dickhead if you don't want to talk, and that was definitely said about me. Being in a band forced me to have to get over my awkwardness around people and you can really see what I was going through in there."

== Reception ==
=== Critical ===
Professional ratings
Review scores
Source	Rating
AllMusic	5/5 stars
PopMatters	7/10 stars

Upon its release, the album received critical acclaim. In a very positive review, Johnny Loftus of AllMusic said about the album, "Ascendancy aligns real-deal thrash with powerful modern influences. But at all times it's a platform for Trivium's own crazed talent." It has been widely recognized as one of the greatest metalcore albums of all time.

=== Accolades ===
- In 2005, Ascendancy won the "Album of the Year Award" from Kerrang! magazine.
- "Dying in Your Arms" was nominated for Best Single at the 2006 Kerrang! Awards.
- In August 2009, Ascendancy ended up No. 22 in Kerrang!'s "21st Century's Greats" list.
- In October 2018, Ascendancy ended up No. 11 in Metal Hammer's The 100 Greatest Metal Albums of the 21st Century list.

== Commercial performance ==
Since its release, Ascendancy has sold over 500,000 copies worldwide. In the U.S., the album peaked at No. 151 on the Billboard 200 and at No. 4 on the Top Heatseekers charts, and has sold over 140,000 units. In the UK, it peaked at No. 79, and shipped over 100,000 copies, attaining Gold status, without entering the UK top 75.

== Track listing ==
All lyrics are written by Matt Heafy.

No.	Title	Music	Length
1.	"The End of Everything"	Heafy, Jason Suecof	1:20
2.	"Rain"	Heafy, Corey Beaulieu	4:11
3.	"Pull Harder on the Strings of Your Martyr"	Heafy, Beaulieu, Suecof, Travis Smith	4:51
4.	"Drowned and Torn Asunder"	Heafy, Beaulieu	4:17
5.	"Ascendancy"	Heafy	4:25
6.	"A Gunshot to the Head of Trepidation"	Heafy, Beaulieu	5:55
7.	"Like Light to the Flies"	Heafy, Beaulieu	5:40
8.	"Dying in Your Arms"	Heafy	2:53
9.	"The Deceived"	Heafy, Beaulieu	5:11
10.	"Suffocating Sight"	Heafy	3:47
11.	"Departure"	Heafy	5:41
12.	"Declaration"	Heafy	7:00
Total length:			55:11

United Kingdom special edition
No.	Title	Music	Length
13.	"Washing Away Me in the Tides"	Heafy	3:46
Total length:			58:57

Worldwide re-release
No.	Title	Music	Length
13.	"Blinding Tears Will Break the Skies"	Heafy	5:10
14.	"Washing Away Me in the Tides"	Heafy	3:46
15.	"Master of Puppets" (Metallica cover, lyrics by James Hetfield)	Hetfield, Lars Ulrich, Cliff Burton, Kirk Hammett	8:11
16.	"Dying in Your Arms" (video mix)	Heafy	3:05
Total length:			75:23

Bonus DVD

Promo videos:
No.	Title	Length
1.	"Like Light to the Flies"
2.	"Pull Harder on the Strings of Your Martyr"
3.	"A Gunshot to the Head of Trepidation"
4.	"Dying in Your Arms"

Live at the London Astoria – 9/18/2005:
No.	Title	Length
1.	"The End of Everything"	1:23
2.	"Rain"	4:21
3.	"Dying in Your Arms"	3:22
4.	"Like Light to the Flies"	6:23
5.	"A Gunshot to the Head of Trepidation"	6:45
6.	"Pull Harder on the Strings of Your Martyr"	5:45

== Notes ==
- The bonus track "Washing Away Me in the Tides" was included on the Underworld: Evolution soundtrack.
- "The End of Everything" is an instrumental track.
- A demo of the song "Blinding Tears Will Break the Skies" was included on the Ember to Inferno re-release and later re-recorded and included as a bonus track on the re-release of Ascendancy.
- A demo of the song "The Deceived" was also included on the Ember to Inferno re-release and was later re-recorded and included as a track on Ascendancy.
- The entire Ascendancy album was originally recorded in Drop D♭ tuning. However, because of an error, everything ended up out of tune, so the band tuned up to Drop D.

== Personnel ==
Trivium

- Matt Heafy – lead vocals, guitars, production, art concept
- Corey Beaulieu – guitars, backing vocals
- Paolo Gregoletto – bass, backing vocals
- Travis Smith – drums, percussion, gang vocals on track 6

Production personnel

- Jason Suecof – production, engineering, mixing on track 15, guitar solo on track 3
- Andy Sneap – mixing, mastering, gang vocals on track 6
- Jeff Weed – engineering assistance
- Aaron Caillier – engineering assistance
- Mark Lewis – co-engineer on track 15

Additional personnel

- Chad Sunderland – gang vocals on track 6
- Gizz Butt – gang vocals on track 6
- Paul A. Romano – art direction, artwork, graphic design
- Josh Rothstein – photography

== Charts ==
Chart (2005–2025)	Peak position
Hungarian Physical Albums (MAHASZ)	31
Scottish Albums (Official Charts)	93
UK Albums (Official Charts)	79
UK Rock & Metal Albums (Official Charts)	1
US Billboard 200	151

== Certifications ==
Region	Certification	Certified units/sales
United Kingdom (BPI)	Gold	100,000^{^}
^{^} Shipments figures based on certification alone.
