= B.C. Rich Mockingbird =

Electric guitar model

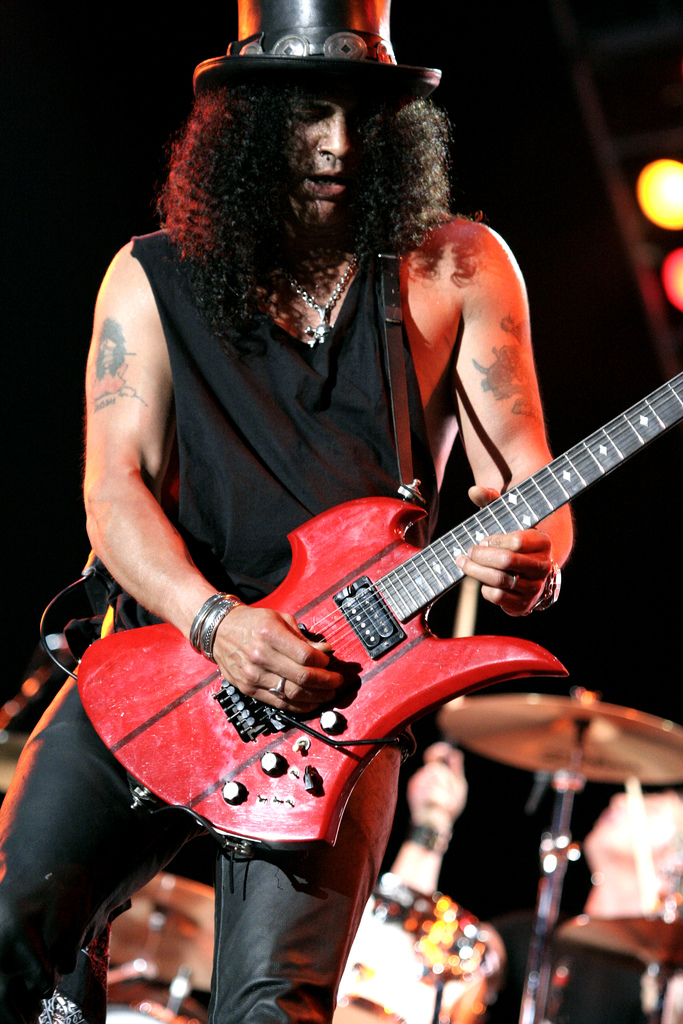
- Slash playing a B.C. Rich Mockingbird
- Manufacturer: B.C. Rich
- Period: 1976 - present

Construction
- Body type: Solid
- Neck joint: Neck-through, bolt-on or set-in

Woods
- Body: Koa or mahogany
- Neck: Mahogany or maple
- Fretboard: Ebony with mother-of-pearl cloud inlays

Hardware
- Bridge: Locking tremolo / Fixed
- Pickup(s): (varies with submodel), (USA) 2 DiMarzio humbucker pickups

Colors available
- (varies with sub-model)

The B.C. Rich Mockingbird is a solid body electric guitar manufactured by B.C. Rich in 1976. There have been several variations on the Mockingbird model throughout the years. As of 2016, the current models are the Mk1, Mk3, Mk5, Mk7, Mk9 and Mk11.

== Origins and history ==
The Mockingbird model was designed on a sketch by bassist Johnny "Go-Go" Kallas. According to Kallas, the "shorthorn" version of the guitar appeared in 1975. The Mockingbird was released in 1976, and was redesigned by Bernie Rico into the "longhorn" version in 1978, which is the better known version of the guitar.

The September 2010 issue of Guitar World ranked the Mockingbird as "the coolest guitar of all time", ahead of guitars such as the Gibson Les Paul and Fender Stratocaster.

== Mockingbird users ==
- Joe Perry
- Dick Wagner, one of the first to use the Mockingbird
- Slash (Seen in the Guns N' Roses "You Could Be Mine" music video from Terminator 2: Judgment Day)
- Dave Mustaine
- Lita Ford
- Eric Melvin
- Steve Hunter
- Nils Lofgren
- George Kooymans of Golden Earring
- Chuck Schuldiner
- Josh Homme
- Mieszko Talarczyk of Nasum
- Jake Pitts
- Kerry King of Slayer
- Mille Petrozza of Kreator
- Eric Griffin
- Trey Anastasio of Phish is playing a green acrylic Mockingbird as part of the band's Halloween 2021 Musical Costume.
- Paolo Gregoletto of Trivium
- Dave Davidson of Revocation
- Rick Derringer
- John Konesky
- hide of X Japan
- Vic DiCara
- Sean Blosl of Sanctuary
- Gerard Way of My Chemical Romance
- Mikael Åkerfeldt of Opeth
- Steve Steinman of Vampires Rock
- Rhian Teasdale of Wet Leg
- Niclas Engelin

== See also ==
- B.C. Rich Warlock
- Parker Fly
