= In Waves (Trivium album) =

Studio album by Trivium
- Released: August 2, 2011
- Recorded: 2011
- Studio: Paint It Black Studios, Altamonte Springs, Florida; Audiohammer Studios, Sanford, Florida
- Genre: Metalcore; heavy metal
- Length: 51:21; 67:33 (extended version)
- Label: Roadrunner
- Producer: Colin Richardson; Martyn "Ginge" Ford

Trivium studio album chronology
Shogun (2008)	In Waves (2011)	Vengeance Falls (2013)

Singles from In Waves
- 1. "In Waves" Released: May 21, 2011; 2. "Built to Fall" Released: August 16, 2011; 3. "Black" Released: January 23, 2012; 4. "Watch the World Burn" Released: November 16, 2012

In Waves is the fifth studio album by American heavy metal band Trivium. It was released worldwide during August 2011 through Roadrunner Records and was produced by Colin Richardson and Martyn "Ginge" Ford.

== Background and promotion ==
It is the first album to feature second drummer Nick Augusto and the first without original drummer Travis Smith. The first single from the band, "In Waves", was released on May 21, 2011, to Trivium World members. Following this on June 6, 2011, Matt Heafy stated on his Twitter that the album would be named after the aforementioned song. The single was most recently released onto the US iTunes Store & Zune Marketplace on June 10.

On June 17, the music video for "In Waves" was released.

On June 19, Trivium performed "In Waves", "Black" and "Dusk Dismantled" at their show in Birmingham, United Kingdom. It was the first time "In Waves" was played live and the first time "Black" and "Dusk Dismantled" had been heard by fans.

On June 26, Paolo told his Twitter followers to tweet to Roadrunner Records to release the song "Dusk Dismantled". On June 28, the song was released exclusively to TriviumWorld members with an announcement that it'll be released to the official Trivium YouTube page on June 29.

On July 9, Trivium played "Inception of the End" live for the first time at the Rockstar Mayhem Festival in San Bernardino, CA. Not only was it the first time the song had been played live, but it was also the first time the song had been heard by fans. On July 13, Trivium released "Inception of the End" with the song premiering on HotTopic.com. On July 21, both "Black" and "Built to Fall" premiered on various radio stations including their hometown station WJRR.com and 98online.com.

On their 2011 run on the Mayhem Festival tour, Matt Heafy stated that "Built to Fall" would be their first radio single, and the live debut of "Caustic Are the Ties That Bind" was played in San Francisco supporting Dream Theater.

The music video for "Built to Fall" is released on the October 28, 2011, after a series of image and video teasers released over Facebook and YouTube, while TriviumWorld members could view the video two days earlier.

A lyric video for "Black" has been released in January 2012.

On November 16, 2012, a music video for the single "Watch the World Burn" was released. It features various amounts of live and backstage footage while touring for In Waves. It also features footage from the live recording at Chapman Studios, which was directed by Ramon Boutviseth.

== Composition ==
The album featured a sound closer to Ascendancy than The Crusade and Shogun and features their more traditional heavy metal and metalcore sound than thrash metal. Nick Augusto's drum work features blast beats in tracks "Inception of the End", "Forsake Not the Dream", "Chaos Reigns" and "Shattering the Skies Above".

== Critical reception ==
Professional ratings
Aggregate scores
Source	Rating
Metacritic	66/100
Review scores
Source	Rating
AllMusic	4/5 stars
BBC Music	favorable
Consequence of Sound	3/5 stars
The Guardian	2/5 stars
Kerrang!	4/5 stars
Loudwire	4/5 stars
MusicOMH	3/5 stars
PopMatters	4/10
Q	8/10 stars
Revolver	3/5

In Waves has received generally positive reviews, averaging a score of 66 based on 13 reviewers on the review-aggregating website Metacritic.

Eduardo Rivadavia of AllMusic rated the album four out of five stars and commented, "...Trivium will probably be vilified once again for taking the same sort of creative backward step that the fans typically clamor for from Metallica, Slayer, and other bands on down; it's the essence of the Florida band's "can't win" lot in life, but there's always hope that this will change, in time". Another positive review came from Ian Winwood of BBC Music, in his review, he stated, "...This may not be quite enough for Trivium to turn back the hands of the clock to the point where the world lay at their fretboards, but the notion that this is a band whose best days lie behind them is one that, at least for now, is resting on ice". AltSounds also spoke positively about the album and even after stating "Trivium have not topped themselves" in reference to their past albums but did call it "...a symbol of triumph and overall a sound, beautifully solid record."

Revolver rated the album three out of five stars and summarized, "An inconsistent record with flashes of brilliance, In Waves should, however, keep diehard Trivium fans happy."

Despite mostly positive reception, the album was poorly received by Jamie Thomson from The Guardian, who, in his review, stated that, "In Waves is as overproduced and mercilessly polished as modern metal gets, and all the worse for it."

== Commercial performance ==
In Waves sold 22,000 copies in its first week of release and debuted at No. 13 on the Billboard 200 and at No. 1 on the Billboard Hard Rock charts, making it the highest-charting record Trivium has released to date. In Canada, the album debuted at No. 32 on the Canadian Albums Chart. The album also charted in the UK at No. 17 on the UK Top 40 albums chart, No. 6 in Japan and No. 8 in Germany. In Waves has sold 81,000 copies in the United States as of 2013.

== Track listing ==
All tracks are written by Trivium, except where noted.

Standard edition track listing
No.	Title	Length
1.	"Capsizing the Sea" (instrumental)	1:30
2.	"In Waves"	5:02
3.	"Inception of the End"	3:48
4.	"Dusk Dismantled"	3:47
5.	"Watch the World Burn"	4:53
6.	"Black"	3:27
7.	"A Skyline's Severance"	4:52
8.	"Built to Fall"	3:08
9.	"Caustic Are the Ties That Bind"	5:34
10.	"Forsake Not the Dream"	5:20
11.	"Chaos Reigns"	4:07
12.	"Of All These Yesterdays"	4:21
13.	"Leaving This World Behind" (instrumental)	1:32
Total length:		51:21

Japanese edition bonus track
No.	Title	Length
14.	"In Waves" (live from Chapman Studios)	4:46
Total length:		56:07

Special edition
No.	Title	Length
1.	"Capsizing the Sea" (instrumental)	1:30
2.	"In Waves"	5:02
3.	"Inception of the End"	3:48
4.	"Dusk Dismantled"	3:47
5.	"Watch the World Burn"	4:53
6.	"Black"	3:27
7.	"A Skyline's Severance"	4:52
8.	"Ensnare the Sun" (bonus track; instrumental)	1:22
9.	"Built to Fall"	3:08
10.	"Caustic Are the Ties That Bind"	5:34
11.	"Forsake Not the Dream"	5:20
12.	"Drowning in Slow Motion" (bonus track)	4:29
13.	"A Grey So Dark" (bonus track)	2:41
14.	"Chaos Reigns"	4:07
15.	"Of All These Yesterdays"	4:21
16.	"Leaving This World Behind" (instrumental)	1:32
17.	"Shattering the Skies Above" (bonus track; previously released on God of War: Blood & Metal)	4:42
18.	"Slave New World" (bonus track; Sepultura cover; written by Max Cavalera, Igor Cavalera, Andreas Kisser, Paulo Jr., Evan Seinfeld)	2:58
Total length:		67:33

Bonus DVD
No.	Title	Length
1.	"In Waves" (live from Chapman Studios)	4:46
2.	"Black" (live from Chapman Studios)	3:26
3.	"Built to Fall" (live from Chapman Studios)	3:19
4.	"Watch the World Burn" (live from Chapman Studios)	4:45
5.	"The Deceived" (live from Chapman Studios)	5:12
6.	"Suffocating Sight" (live from Chapman Studios)	3:52
7.	"Down from the Sky" (live from Chapman Studios)	5:18
8.	"Ember to Inferno" (live from Chapman Studios)	4:41
9.	"In Waves" (documentary)	41:40
10.	"In Waves" (music video)	7:02

== Personnel ==
Trivium

- Matt Heafy – lead vocals, guitars
- Corey Beaulieu – guitars, backing vocals, gang vocals on "Shattering the Skies Above"
- Paolo Gregoletto – bass, backing vocals, gang vocals on "Shattering the Skies Above"
- Nick Augusto – drums, percussion

Production

- Produced by Colin Richardson and Martyn "Ginge" Ford
- Engineered by Carl Bown
- Mastered by Ted Jensen

== Charts ==
Chart performance for In Waves
Chart (2011)	Peak position
Australian Albums (ARIA)	9
Austrian Albums (Ö3 Austria)	17
Belgian Albums (Ultratop Flanders)	72
Belgian Albums (Ultratop Wallonia)	68
Dutch Albums (Album Top 100)	44
Finnish Albums (Suomen virallinen lista)	10
French Albums (SNEP)	74
German Albums (Offizielle Top 100)	8
Irish Albums (IRMA)	26
Japanese Albums (Oricon)	28
New Zealand Albums (RMNZ)	12
Norwegian Albums (VG-lista)	21
Scottish Albums (OCC)	12
Swedish Albums (Sverigetopplistan)	56
Swiss Albums (Schweizer Hitparade)	24
UK Albums (OCC)	16
UK Rock & Metal Albums (OCC)	1
US Billboard 200	13
US Digital Albums (Billboard)	12
US Top Hard Rock Albums (Billboard)	1
US Top Rock Albums (Billboard)	1
US Indie Store Album Sales (Billboard)	7

== Release history ==
Release history and formats for In Waves
Region	Date	Format
Japan	August 2, 2011	Digital download
Ireland	August 5, 2011	Digital download
United Kingdom	August 8, 2011	Digital download
Canada	August 9, 2011	Digital download
United States	August 9, 2011	Digital download
