= B.C. Rich =

American brand of acoustic and electric guitars and bass guitars

B.C. Rich Guitars
- Type: Private
- Industry: Musical instruments
- Founded: 1974; 52 years ago in Los Angeles, California, U.S.
- Founder: Bernardo Chavez Rico
- Headquarters: United States
- Area served: Worldwide
- Products: Electric guitars Bass guitars Acoustic guitars
- Website: bcrich.com

B.C. Rich is an American brand of acoustic and electric guitars and bass guitars. B.C. Rich had its origins in a guitar shop Bernardo Chavez Rico helped run with his father, which initially produced acoustic guitars that became popular amidst the folk music revival. Rico began making electric guitars in the late 1960s and established himself as one of the first boutique electric guitar builders, before releasing production models beginning in 1974. With the shop's name changed to B.C. Rich, Rico grew it into a company known for radical guitar designs that became popular with heavy metal bands beginning in the 1980s. Notable models include the Mockingbird and Warlock.

== History ==
Bernardo Chavez Rico (born October 13, 1941 – December 3, 1999), known as Bernie Rico Sr., or simply B.C., was born in East Los Angeles, California and began his career helping his father build classical guitars, banjos, and ukuleles in the 1950s. Rico's original instruments were acoustic guitars made under the names "Bernardo Rico" or "B.C. Rico." In the 1970s, he began using the name "B.C. Rich" when he founded a company to manufacture electric guitars.

In the following decade, B.C. Rich gained a broad exposure with the popularity of heavy metal and has often been linked to that music scene. High-end B.C. Rich instruments were custom-made in the US by Ron Estrada whereas the mid- and low-end models were produced in different countries in Asia. In 1987, Bernie Rico entered into a marketing agreement with Randy Waltuch’s company Class Axe, allowing them to market and distribute Rave, Platinum, and NJ Series guitars. A year later, Class Axe took over importing, marketing, and distribution of the foreign-made lines and soon after that, took complete control. B.C. Rich’s custom shop was disbanded and the name B.C. Rich was licensed in 1989. Guitars thereafter were made in Korea.

During this period, quality control nosedived and the B.C. Rich name suffered. Bernie went on to produce his own guitars under the brand Mason Bernard, these being handmade acoustic-electrics and Strat-shaped electrics. In 1993, Bernie regained ownership of B.C. Rich and made a concerted effort to restore the company's name until his death on December 3, 1999. The company was acquired in the 2000s by Hanser Music Group, a distribution company based in Hebron, Kentucky. B.C Rich was later licensed to Praxis Musical based in Orange, California until 2018.

On July 21, 2019, B.C. Rich was acquired by a new management team led by Bill Xavier. The new management reintroduced BC legacy models such as the IronBird and Stealth.

== Design and types ==
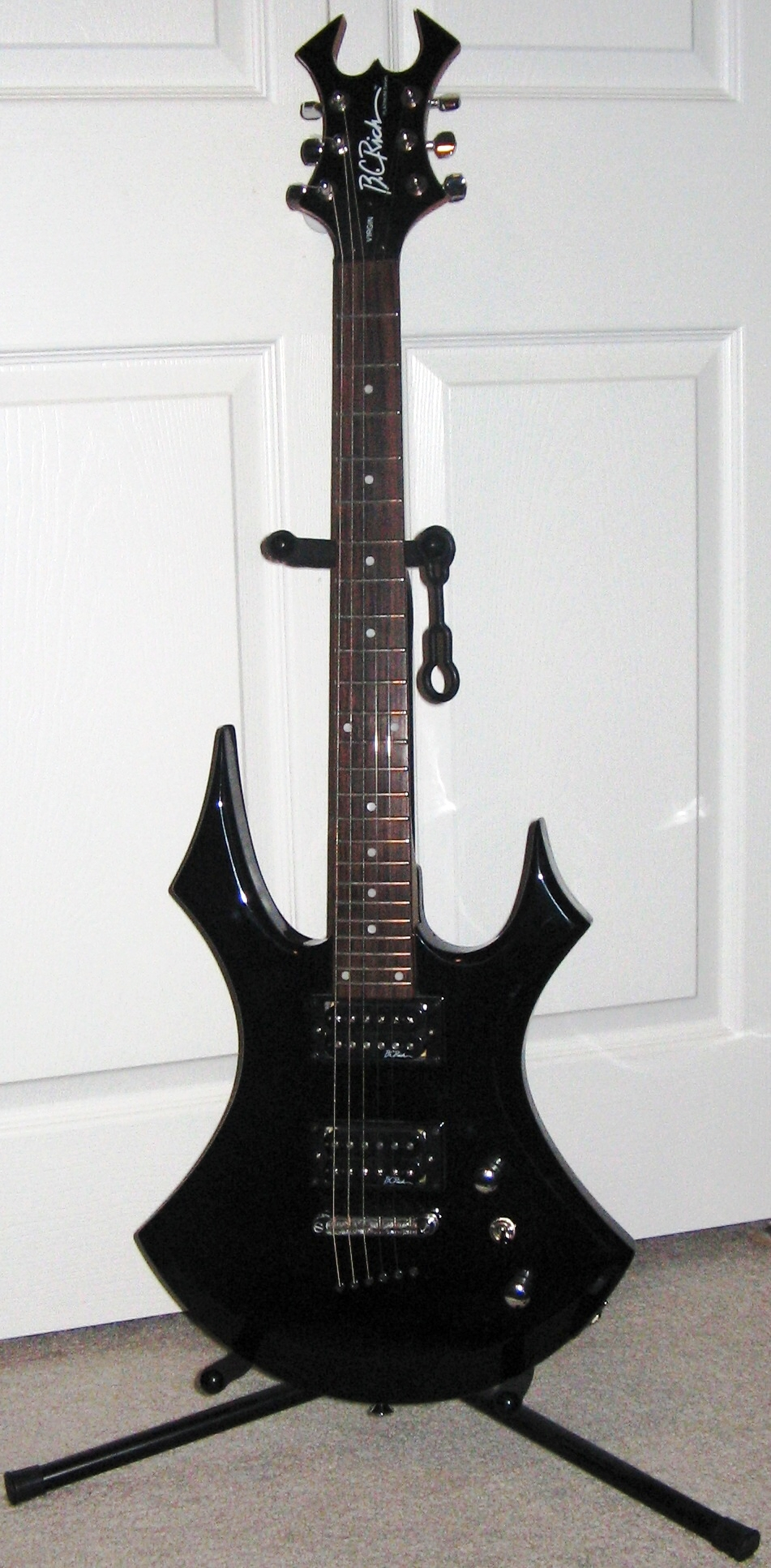
Virgin platinum series

=== Seagull ===
The Seagull shape was uncomfortable for some to play due to the sharp upper point, and the sharp lower point that dug into the leg sitting down. It was redesigned several times to include a smoother lower point, and a Junior version with simpler electronics, then a pointless version which is quite rare. Finally it morphed into the Eagle shape with no sharp points.

=== Stealth ===
The Stealth was designed by Rick Derringer. Chuck Schuldiner owned several B.C. Rich guitars. In 2008, B.C. Rich released the Chuck Schuldiner Tribute Stealth, as well as a handcrafted version, with a portion of the proceeds going directly to Schuldiner's family. In 2021, B.C. Rich announced the Chuck Schuldiner Stealth.

=== Eagle ===
This model was made popular by Brad Whitford of Aerosmith and Neil Giraldo, who played his Eagle on some of the early Pat Benatar albums and videos.

=== Mockingbird ===
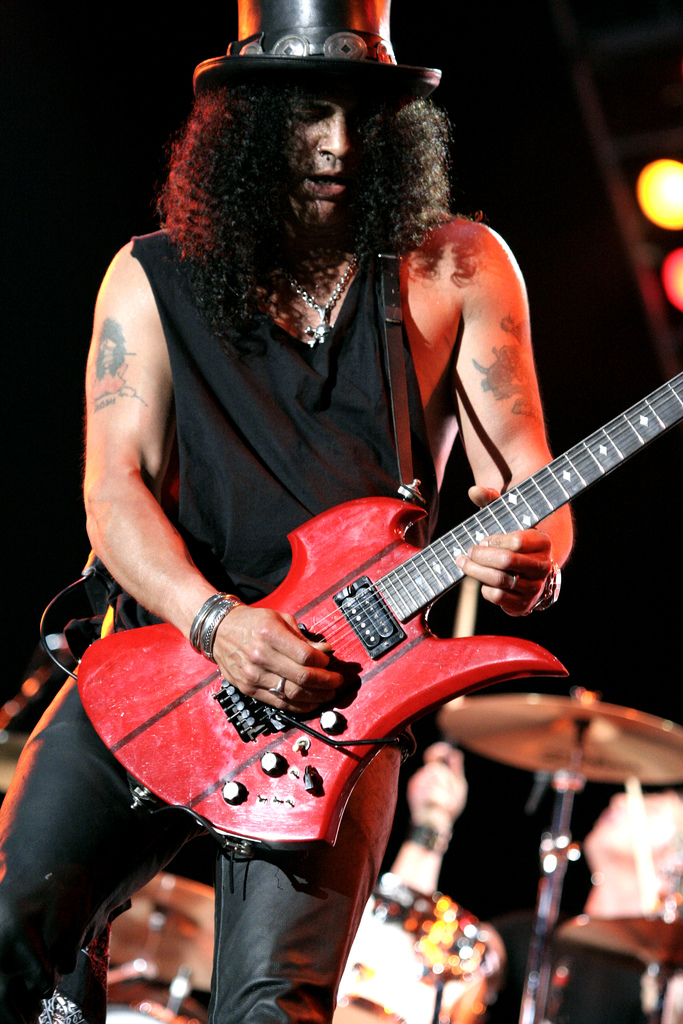
Slash playing his signature Mockingbird in 2007

The Mockingbird model was designed by Johnny "Go-Go" Kessel. It was made popular by Joe Perry of Aerosmith and Lita Ford of The Runaways. The Mockingbird experienced a resurgence in the early 1990s through Guns N' Roses lead guitarist Slash after he played one on the Use Your Illusion world tour. David Ellefson of Megadeth played a Mockingbird bass in first years of the band. Dave Mustaine also played a Bich in Metallica and Megadeth in the early days.

=== The B.C. Rich ("Bich") ===
The B.C. Rich "Bich" ten-string guitar was developed by Neal Moser, a sub-contractor for Bernie Rico (B.C. Rich) from 1974 to 1985. During his time with B.C. Rich, Moser conceived, designed, and built the first prototype. He then licensed the design to B.C. Rich. The guitar was introduced as the "Rich Bich" at the 1978 NAMM International Music & Sound Expo as a custom-order model.

The original Bich is a six-course instrument, but with four two-string courses. The top E and B strings are strung as unison pairs, and the G and D strings as pairs with a principal and octave string, in the manner of the top four courses of a twelve-string guitar. The A and lower E strings are single-string courses. This unusual stringing was meant to obtain the brightness of the twelve-string guitar, while allowing higher levels of distortion before the sound became muddy.

The Bich had a conventional six-string headstock for the principal strings, with the four extra strings tuned by machine heads positioned in the body, past the tailpiece, with a large angled notch allowing access to the tuners. This radical body shape also countered the common tendency of coursed electric guitars to be head-heavy due to the weight of the extra machine heads.

The design was moderately successful, but many players bought it for the body shape alone, and removed the extra strings. B.C. Rich eventually released 6-string and 6/12-string double neck models of the Bich body shape. All Bich variants are hardtail guitars with through body necks and two humbucking pickups. The ten-string models differ from each other in finish and control details.

A lawsuit between Neal Moser and HHI Holdings Inc./B.C. Rich was settled, giving Moser Custom Guitars and HHI/B.C. Rich the right to produce their own versions of the Bich ten- and six-string guitars, with Neal Moser retaining ownership of the original body templates. The Moser Custom Shop "Moser 10" and the BC Rich Bich "PMS" models are the closest representations of the original pre-1985 "Rich Bich" body design. The "Moser 10" models have an "M" inlay on the headstock, compared to the HHI/BC Rich "R" headstock inlay.

Notable users of the ten-string Bich include Joe Perry (Aerosmith), Dave Mustaine (Megadeth), Chris Poland, also of Megadeth, Manny Charlton (Nazareth), and George Kooymans (Golden Earring), John Christ (Samhain) (Danzig).

=== BC Rich Bich "PMS" 10 String Prototype ===
To celebrate the 25th-anniversary release of the "Rich Bich" 10-string guitar, HHI/BC Rich contracted the original BC Rich luthiers Neal Moser and Sal Gonzales to produce 25 true hand-built reproductions of the original prototype to the Bich 10-string model. These hand-carved guitars were built from Neal Moser's original 1978 body templates, using the same exotic woods (black African walnut, maple and Brazilian rosewood) as the original prototype model.

Due to contract issues between Neal Moser and Hanser Holdings, only 16 of the PMS models were produced. These have become highly prized by BC Rich collectors due to the limited production number. The original prototype is currently owned by Dan Lawrence.

Dave Mustaine (Megadeth) was known to use the ten-string variant of the Bich throughout the early 1980s, although with the four additional strings removed. The guitar was reportedly pawned, without Mustaine's knowledge, by Megadeth lead guitarist Chris Poland, which led to his dismissal. The current whereabouts of the guitar are unknown.

John Christ (Samhain) (Danzig) Known for using the six-string Bich and a modified 10-string Bich, both with a Kahler (Backup 1983 customized 10-string converted to 6-string, currently on display at the Hard Rock cafè Orlando).

=== Warlock ===
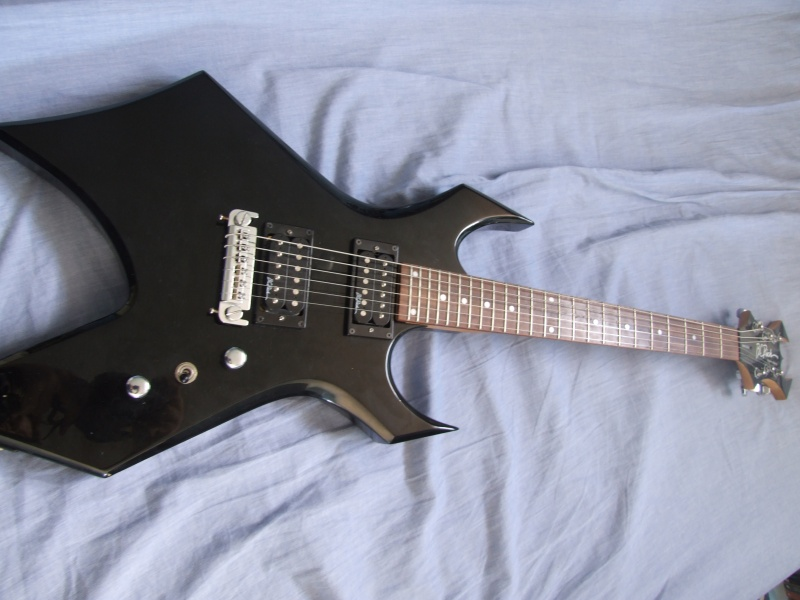
B.C. Rich uses unusual shapes for its solid body guitars; pictured is the Warlock model

The introduction of the Warlock model in 1981 helped push B.C. Rich into the heavy metal music genre. Notable early players included Mick Mars and Nikki Sixx of Mötley Crüe, Lita Ford, Paul Stanley of Kiss (featuring a broken mirror top), Randy Jackson (Zebra), Craig Goldy of Dio and Giuffria, and a young pre-Les Paul playing Slash. Its popularity continued with players such as Slayer guitarist Kerry King and Sepultura frontman Max Cavalera. While Slipknot was gaining in popularity (early 2000's), guitarist Mick Thomson was well known for his signature red/black and black/white Warlocks with "HATE" fretboard inlays.

A variation on the Warlock design, called the "Warbeast", has also been produced. The Warbeast features a more heavily beveled body, longer body horns, as well as an additional horn in the upper middle section. The Warbeast was also produced exclusively with the "3-in-line" headstock design, and with Floyd Rose bridges included as standard, except on the more affordable models.

=== Ironbird ===
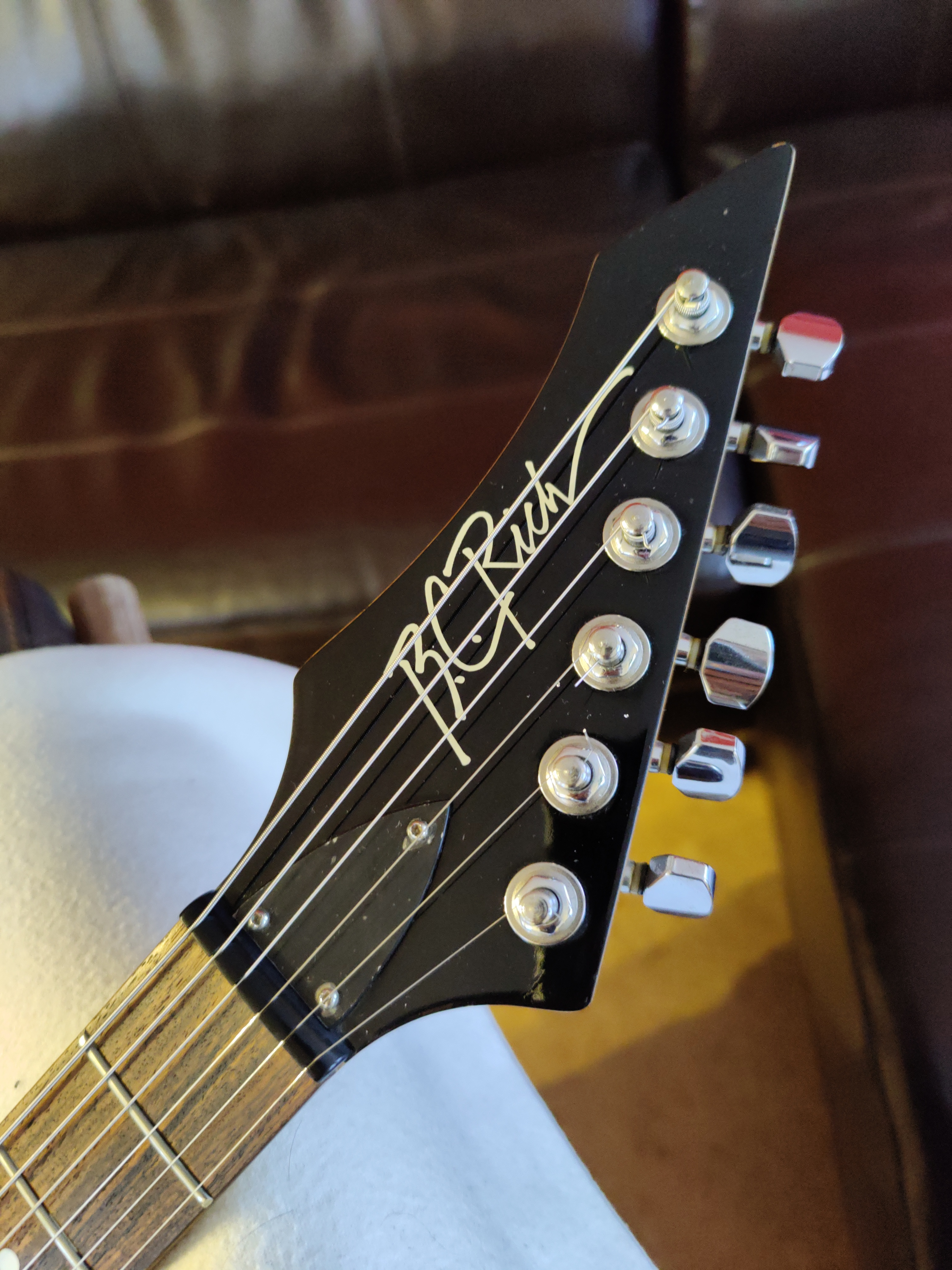
Ironbird reverse headstock

Designed by Joey Rico in 1983, the Ironbird gained some popularity amongst heavy metal guitarists, including Trey Azagthoth of Morbid Angel and his former bandmate, Erik Rutan. The original model had a pointed reverse headstock, whereas the 21st Century version has a regular pointed headstock.

=== Acrylic series ===
These guitars are made completely of acrylic and their bodies are transparent, making the electronics inside visible. The original run of the acrylic models featured a standard bolt-on maple neck with wood headstock, but later models featured an acrylic headstock, matching the color of the body and making the overall appearance of the guitar more attractive. Acrylic is more dense than most woods (specific gravity of acrylic is 1.18 g/cm^{3} while that of lignum vitae, contender for the most dense type of wood, is approximately 1.23 g/cm^{3}) which makes the guitar heavier.

== See also ==
- List of B.C. Rich guitars
