= Nick Augusto =

American drummer

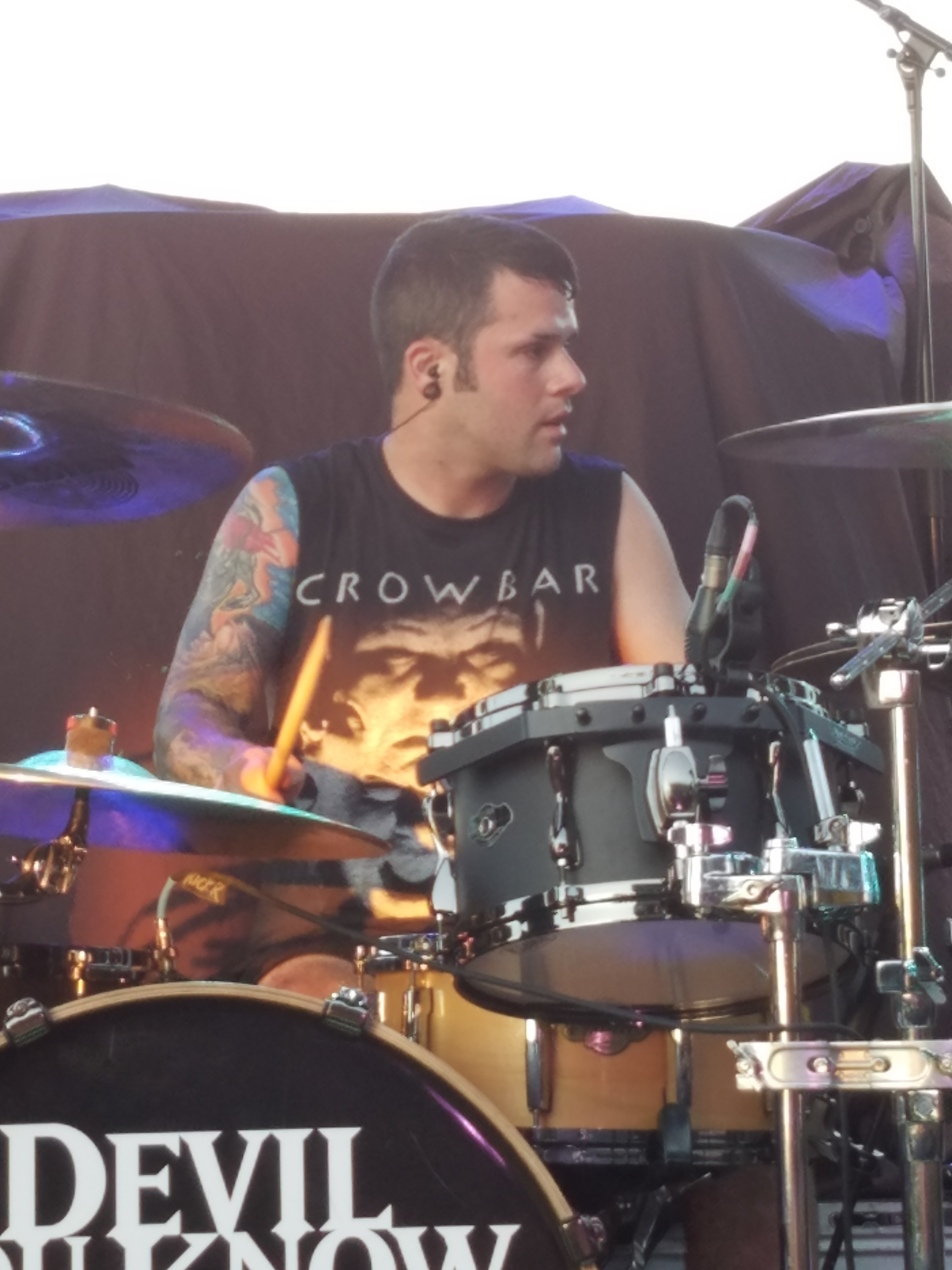
- Augusto performing with Devil You Know in 2016

Background information
- Born: August 4, 1986 (age 39); Fort Lauderdale, Florida, U.S.
- Genres: Metalcore; heavy metal; thrash metal; grindcore
- Occupations: Musician; drum-technician
- Instruments: Drums; percussion
- Years active: 1999–present
- Label: Roadrunner
- Formerly of: Trivium; Maruta; Metal Militia

Nick Augusto (born August 4, 1986) is an American musician, best known as the former drummer of heavy metal band Trivium, in which he played from 2009 until 2014. He was the former touring drummer for Devil You Know/Light the Torch from 2016 to 2017.

== Career ==
Augusto was the drummer for the Floridian grindcore band Maruta, as well as Metal Militia, in which he played with Trivium bassist Paolo Gregoletto whom he had known since kindergarten. He was a part of Trivium technical crew being responsible for drums. After the first leg of "Into The Mouth Of Hell We Tour", which was the band's first domestic tour as a headliner, drummer and founding member Travis Smith went on indefinite hiatus. Augusto was offered to fill-in for him, as the band praised his speedy approach to performing its songs. He played his first show with Trivium on October 29, 2009 at The Masquerade in Atlanta. The band finished the second leg of the tour on December 12, 2009 playing a hometown show in Orlando, with Augusto on drums.

On February 4, 2010, shortly before the upcoming Asian tour, Augusto was introduced as the new official member of Trivium, as Travis Smith again refused to join the band for live performances. Around the same time, two new songs, "Shattering the Skies Above" and a cover of Sepultura's "Slave New World", were released, both featuring Augusto. He recorded two studio albums with the band and appeared in numerous music videos.

On May 3, 2014, he played at the Carolina Rebellion festival, which turned out to be his last with Trivium. Four days later, it was announced that band had parted ways with Augusto whilst travelling on their tour bus in the midst of their Vengeance Falls album tour due to "off-stage differences".

In October 2014, Augusto announced his new project named Corrosion and revealed the plans of recording an EP with producer Jason Suecof and Daniel Bergstrand.

From May 2016-January 2017, Augusto played drums on tour for Light the Torch.

== Discography ==
- Implosive Disgorgence – Chapters EP
- Entropy - "Protean"
- Infernaeon – A Symphony of Suffering (prosthetic records)
- Entropy - "This Tide As Manifest Destiny" EP
- Maruta- Demonstration
- Maruta – In Narcosis (willowtip records)
- Maruta - this comp kills fascists (relapse records)
- Ends Of The Earth – Rebirth EP
- Corrosion - EP (maskina records)

With Trivium:

- Shattering the Skies Above (single) (2010)
- Slave New World (Sepultura cover) (2010)
- In Waves (2011)
- Vengeance Falls (2013)
