= The Crusade (album) =

Studio album by Trivium
- Released: October 10, 2006
- Studios: Audiohammer Studios, Sanford, Florida; Morrisound Recording, Tampa, Florida
- Genres: Thrash metal; progressive metal; speed metal
- Length: 57:27
- Label: Roadrunner
- Producers: Jason Suecof; Trivium

Trivium studio album chronology
Ascendancy (2005)	The Crusade (2006)	Shogun (2008)

Singles from The Crusade
- 1. "Detonation" Released: June 2006; 2. "Entrance of the Conflagration" Released: September 6, 2006; 3. "Anthem (We Are the Fire)" Released: October 2, 2006; 4. "The Rising" Released: April 2007; 5. "Becoming the Dragon" Released: November 2007

The Crusade is the third studio album by American heavy metal band Trivium. It was released on October 10, 2006, through Roadrunner Records and was produced by Jason Suecof and the band themselves. The album marked a significant musical change from the metalcore sound of their preceding album Ascendancy, with the band utilizing thrash metal influences. Accordingly, vocalist/guitarist Matt Heafy sings with primarily clean vocals throughout The Crusade, rather than utilizing the screaming style heard on Ascendancy.

The Crusade peaked at number 7 in United Kingdom and was later certified silver in for sales in excess of 60,000 copies. In the United States, the album debuted at No. 25 on the US Billboard 200 albums chart on its release, selling 31,000 copies in the US in its first week. It has sold over 100,000 copies in the United States.

== Background ==
Before the album was released, three songs from the album were released on the band's MySpace: "Detonation", "Anthem (We Are the Fire)", and "Entrance of the Conflagration". Music videos for "Entrance of the Conflagration", "Anthem (We Are the Fire)", "The Rising", "To the Rats", and "Becoming the Dragon" were produced and released on Roadrunner's website.

"Anthem (We Are the Fire)" was a hit for the band in the United Kingdom, with the track debuting at number 1 on the UK Rock & Metal Singles Chart and spending several further weeks in the top 10. As of 2019, the single is also the band's only track to break into the UK Singles Chart, peaking at number 40.

The track "Detonation" is available on the Xbox 360 release of the video game Guitar Hero II as downloadable content while the track "Anthem (We Are the Fire)" is featured on Burnout Dominator, Sleeping Dogs and Saints Row 2.

== Composition ==
The album represents a drastic change in style from their previous album, Ascendancy, abandoning the metalcore genre and featuring a style described generally as thrash metal and reminiscent of thrash metal band Metallica's 1980s albums, along with progressive metal and speed metal. As a result, vocalist Matt Heafy used much less screaming and more of a clean vocal style similar to James Hetfield throughout most of the record. Heafy justified this by noting that "the four of us were never into bands that scream and we don't like any of the current bands that scream, so we asked ourselves why we're doing it." Screamed vocals (along with the metalcore genre itself) would return as a regular attribute on the band's proceeding album, Shogun, although some metalcore elements and screams can occasionally be found in The Crusade, most notably in "Becoming the Dragon" and "To the Rats".

Lyrical themes on the album include famous killings. "Entrance of the Conflagration" is about Andrea Yates' murder of her five children, "Contempt Breeds Contamination" is about the death of Amadou Diallo, and "And Sadness Will Sear" is based upon the murder of Matthew Shepard. Many of the lyrics on the album are more direct political and personal critiques than those on Trivium's other albums. In a 2022 interview with Primordial Radio, Heafy revealed this aspect was influenced by Against Me!, particularly their 2005 album Searching for a Former Clarity.

Professional ratings
Review scores
Source	Rating
AllMusic	4/5 stars
Blabbermouth.net	8.5/10
IGN	8.1/10
Sputnikmusic	2/5 stars

== Track listing ==
All music and lyrics by Matt Heafy, except where noted.

No.	Title	Music	Length
1.	"Ignition"		3:54
2.	"Detonation"		4:28
3.	"Entrance of the Conflagration"		4:35
4.	"Anthem (We Are the Fire)"	Heafy, Paolo Gregoletto	4:03
5.	"Unrepentant"	Corey Beaulieu	4:51
6.	"And Sadness Will Sear"		3:34
7.	"Becoming the Dragon"		4:43
8.	"To the Rats"	Gregoletto	3:42
9.	"This World Can't Tear Us Apart"		3:30
10.	"Tread the Floods"	Beaulieu	3:33
11.	"Contempt Breeds Contamination"		4:28
12.	"The Rising"	Gregoletto	3:45
13.	"The Crusade"		8:21
Total length:			57:27

iTunes and "Anthem (We Are the Fire)" single bonus tracks
No.	Title	Music	Length
14.	"Broken One"	Gregoletto	5:50
15.	"Vengeance"	Beaulieu	3:38
Total length:			66:55

=== Notes ===
- "The Crusade" is an instrumental track.
- "Broken One" and "Vengeance" is the part of "Rarities EP".

== Personnel ==
Trivium

- Matt Heafy – lead vocals, guitars
- Corey Beaulieu – guitars, backing vocals
- Paolo Gregoletto – bass, backing vocals
- Travis Smith – drums, percussion

Additional performers

- Jason Suecof – additional lead guitar on "The Rising"

Production

- Produced by Trivium and Jason Suecof
- Engineered by Mark Lewis and Jason Suecof
- Mixed by Colin Richardson
- Mix engineer and Pro Tools – Matt Hyde
- Assistant engineer – Laurence Aldridge
- Mastered by Ted Jensen

== Charts ==
Chart (2006)	Peak position
Australian Albums (ARIA)	14
Austrian Albums (Ö3 Austria)	54
Canadian Albums Chart	23
Dutch Albums (Album Top 100)	64
French Albums (SNEP)	115
German Albums (Offizielle Top 100)	23
Irish Albums (IRMA)	12
Italian Albums (FIMI)	86
Japanese Oricon Albums Chart	46
New Zealand Albums (RMNZ)	31
Norwegian Albums (VG-lista)	61
Scottish Albums (Official Charts)	8
Swedish Albums (Sverigetopplistan)	41
Swiss Albums (Schweizer Hitparade)	92
UK Albums (Official Charts)	7
UK Rock & Metal Albums (Official Charts)	1
US Billboard 200	25

== Certifications ==
Region	Certification	Certified units/sales
United Kingdom (BPI)	Gold	100,000^{‡}
^{‡} Sales+streaming figures based on certification alone.
