= Paolo Gregoletto =

American bassist

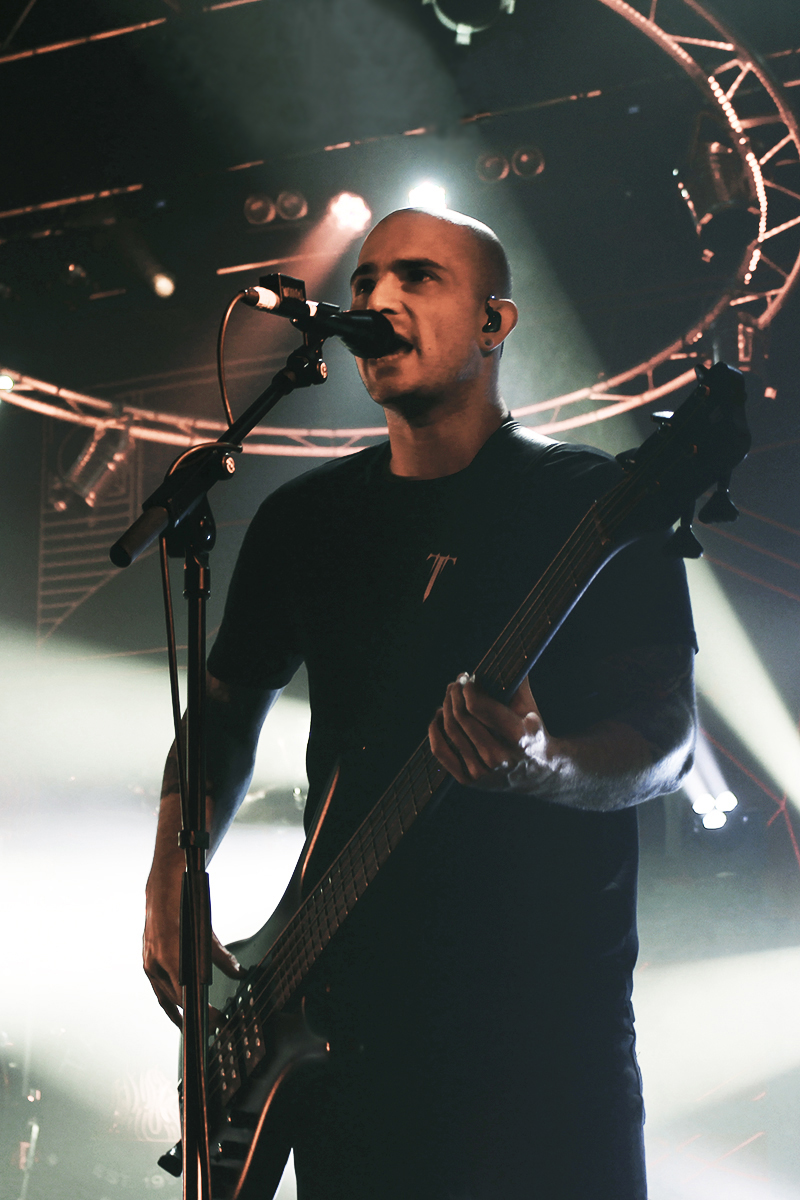
- Gregoletto performing in 2018

Background information
- Born: Paolo Francesco Gregoletto; September 14, 1985 (age 41); Miami, Florida, U.S.
- Genres: Heavy metal; thrash metal; metalcore; progressive metal
- Occupation: Musician
- Instrument: Bass
- Years active: 2000–present
- Member of: Trivium
- Website: trivium.org

Paolo Francesco Gregoletto (born September 14, 1985) is an American musician best known as the bassist of heavy metal band Trivium.

== Career ==
Gregoletto joined Trivium in 2004 when Matt Heafy, Corey Beaulieu and Travis Smith were in the studio demoing new material for what would become Ascendancy. Gregoletto was in the studio with Jason Suecof next to where Trivium were demoing, and was told by Suecof that they needed a bass player. After jamming with other members, Gregoletto agreed to record for Ascendancy and tour to promote it with the band. Gregoletto originally had no intentions of staying with Trivium, but wanted touring experience. He joined just in time for the tour Trivium booked with Machine Head.

Apart from playing bass, he also is capable of playing the guitar. He has been a songwriter for Trivium since The Crusade, on which he composed the songs "To The Rats" and "The Rising" by himself, and co-wrote "Anthem (We Are The Fire)" with Matt Heafy. He also wrote the intro riff for "Throes of Perdition" while playing guitar.

Gregoletto is known to be most frequently interactive with Trivium fans, often answering questions, posting many videos, photos, and band updates via his official Facebook, YouTube and Twitter. Gregoletto has also recently opened an online forum. Since 2013 he has written a monthly column for the UK's Bass Guitar Magazine. Metal producer Colin Richardson called him the best bassist he has ever worked with.

== Technique ==
In an interview with Bass Guitar magazine (July/August), Gregoletto revealed that he uses a variety of techniques to perform his basslines, as is typical of modern bassists. While he primarily used a pick to perform during the tour for Ascendancy, he now more frequently adopts a two fingered plucking style to pick out the more elegant counter-melodies and rapid pentatonic accompaniments necessary for some of Trivium's material. He will also frequently use a three-fingered plucking style, as favored by Billy Sheehan, in order to achieve a gallop rhythm (one eighth note followed by two sixteenth notes) in the style of Iron Maiden's Steve Harris. In the same article, he revealed that he prefers to warm up by performing chromatic exercises up and down the whole neck of the bass, using both plucking and picking styles.

Paolo performs bass solos on the following tracks: “Becoming the Dragon,” “Broken One,” “Torn Between Scylla and Charybdis,” and “Incineration: The Broken World.” In most of his solos, he adopts a guitar-like tone using a wah pedal, and occasionally incorporates tapping techniques.

== Equipment ==
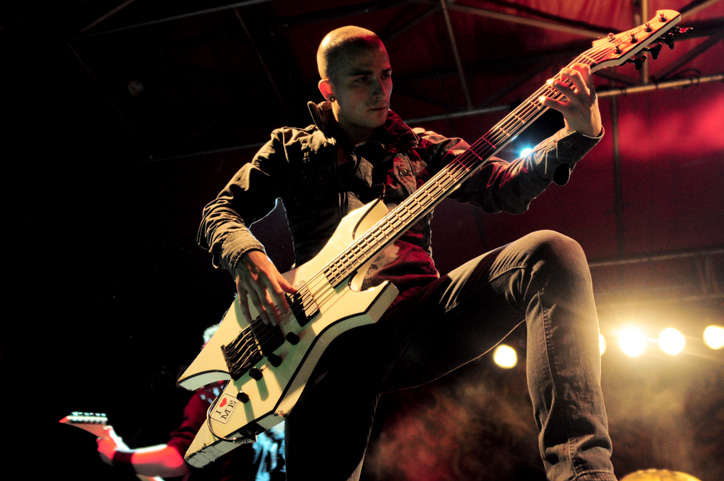
Gregoletto performing in 2010 with his B.C. Rich Warlock bass

Gregoletto was endorsed by B.C. Rich. In the early days when he first joined the band he used a red custom shop Eagle bass. He has a signature 5-string Warlock bass, as well as a custom Mockingbird. Gregoletto was also seen in the videos for Trivium's 2015 singles "Silence in the Snow" and "Until the World Goes Cold" playing a 5-string Warwick Corvette with two humbuckers and a flame maple top. He has been seen playing this same bass at live shows supporting Silence in the Snow. He stated on his Instagram account that he had now fully switched from B.C. Rich to Warwick, but did not specify the reasons, though he still stated he loved his B.C. Rich instruments. In 2021, he became a Kiesel Guitars endorser.

== Discography ==
=== Metal Militia ===
- Perpetual State of Aggression (2003)

=== Trivium ===
- Ascendancy (2005)
- The Crusade (2006)
- Shogun (2008)
- In Waves (2011)
- Vengeance Falls (2013)
- Silence in the Snow (2015)
- The Sin and the Sentence (2017)
- What the Dead Men Say (2020)
- In the Court of the Dragon (2021)
