= Asking Alexandria discography =

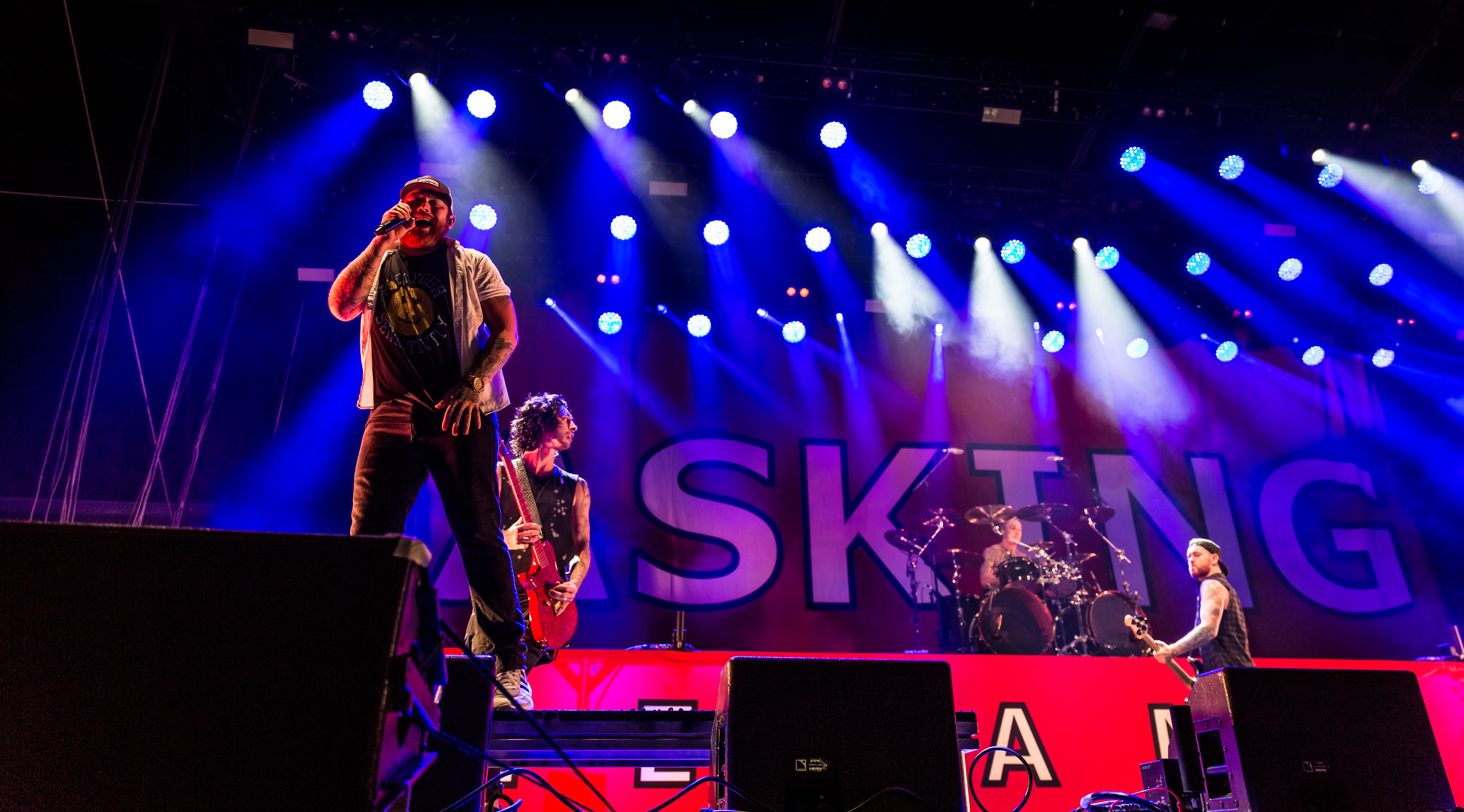
- Asking Alexandria performing at Rock am Ring in 2018
- Studio albums: 9
- EPs: 5
- Live albums: 1
- Singles: 41
- Music videos: 29
- Remix albums: 1
- Other appearances: 4

The following is the complete discography of the English rock band Asking Alexandria. Their releases have so far consisted of nine studio albums, five EPs, one live album, one remix album, 41 singles, 29 music videos and four other appearances.

== Albums ==
=== Studio albums ===
Title	Album details	Chart positions								Sales
Title	Album details	UK	AUS	AUT	BEL	CAN	GER	SWI	US	Sales
Stand Up and Scream	Released: 15 September 2009; Label: Sumerian; Format: CD, vinyl, music download	—	—	—	—	—	—	—	170	US: 67,000
Reckless & Relentless	Released: 5 April 2011; Label: Sumerian; Format: CD, vinyl, music download	98	30	—	—	40	—	—	9	
From Death to Destiny	Released: 6 August 2013; Label: Sumerian; Format: CD, vinyl, music download	28	11	14	113	14	24	—	5	US: 151,000
The Black	Released: 25 March 2016; Label: Sumerian; Format: CD, vinyl, music download	15	4	15	79	14	23	24	9	
Asking Alexandria	Released: 15 December 2017; Label: Sumerian; Format: CD, vinyl, music download	86	53	—	—	53	71	63	27	
Like a House on Fire	Released: 15 May 2020; Label: Sumerian; Format: CD, vinyl, music download	—	—	—	—	—	—	65	80	
See What's on the Inside	Released: 1 October 2021; Label: Better Noise; Format: CD, vinyl, music download	—	—	—	—	—	50	79	—	US: 11,000
Where Do We Go from Here?	Released: 25 August 2023; Label: Better Noise; Format: CD, vinyl, music download	—	—	—	—	—	79	—	—	US: 15,000
"—" denotes a recording that did not chart or was not released in that territory.

=== Live albums ===
Title	Album details
Live from Brixton and Beyond	Released: 15 December 2014; Label: Sumerian; Format: DVD, BitTorrent Bundle

=== Remix albums ===
Title	Album details
Stepped Up and Scratched	Released: 21 November 2011; Label: Sumerian; Format: CD, music download

== Extended plays ==
Title	EP details
Tomorrow. Hope. Goodbye	Released: 2006; Label: Self-released; Format: CD
Life Gone Wild	Released: 21 December 2010; Label: Sumerian; Format: CD, music download, DVD
Under the Influence: A Tribute to the Legends of Hard Rock	Released: 28 November 2012; Label: Sumerian; Format: Music download
Never Gonna Learn	Released: 21 January 2022; Label: Better Noise; Format: Music download
Dark Void EP	Released: 12 January 2024; Label: Better Noise; Format: Music download

== Singles ==
Title	Year	Peak chart positions				Certifications	Album
Title	Year	AUS Hit.	US Main.	US Hard Rock	US Rock /Alt	Certifications	Album
"Final Episode (Let's Change the Channel)"	2009	—	—	—	—	RIAA: Gold	Stand Up and Scream
"If You Can't Ride Two Horses at Once... You Should Get Out of the Circus"	2009	—	—	—	—		Stand Up and Scream
"Not the American Average"	2009	—	—	—	—	RIAA: Gold	Stand Up and Scream
"A Prophecy"	2011	—	—	—	—		Stand Up and Scream
"Morte et Dabo"	2011	—	—	—	— (Note: "Morte et Dabo" did not enter the Hot Rock & Alternative Songs chart, but peaked at number 12 on the Hard Rock Digital Song Sales chart.)		Reckless & Relentless
"Breathless"	2011	—	—	—	—		Reckless & Relentless
"Someone, Somewhere"	2011	—	—	—	—		Reckless & Relentless
"Final Episode (Let's Change the Channel)" (Borgore remix)	2011	—	—	—	—		Stepped Up and Scratched
"Closure"	2011	—	—	—	—		Reckless & Relentless
"To the Stage"	2011	—	—	—	—		Reckless & Relentless
"Another Bottle Down" (Tomba remix)	2011	—	—	—	—		Stepped Up and Scratched
"A Lesson Never Learned" (Celldweller remix)	2011	—	—	—	—		Stepped Up and Scratched
"Reckless & Relentless" (Document One remix)	2011	—	—	—	—		Stepped Up and Scratched
"Reckless & Relentless"	2012	—	—	—	—		Reckless & Relentless
"Run Free"	2012	—	—	—	—		Under the Influence: A Tribute to the Legends of Hard Rock / From Death to Destiny
"The Death of Me"	2013	—	23	—	46		From Death to Destiny
"The Death of Me" (Rock mix)	2013	—	—	—	—		From Death to Destiny
"Killing You"	2013	—	—	—	— (Note: "Killing You" did not enter the Hot Rock & Alternative Songs chart, but peaked at number 16 on the Hard Rock Digital Song Sales chart.)		From Death to Destiny
"Break Down the Walls"	2013	—	17	—	—		From Death to Destiny
"Moving On"	2014	—	6	—	44	RIAA: Gold	From Death to Destiny
"Someone, Somewhere" (Popkong remix)	2015	—	—	—	—		Non-album single
"I Won't Give In"	2015	16	16	—	— (Note: "I Won't Give In" did not enter the Hot Rock & Alternative Songs chart, but peaked at number one on the Hard Rock Digital Song Sales chart.)	RIAA: Gold	The Black
"Undivided"	2015	—	—	—	— (Note: "Undivided" did not enter the Hot Rock & Alternative Songs chart, but peaked at number seven on the Hard Rock Digital Song Sales chart.)		The Black
"The Black"	2016	—	—	—	43		The Black
"Let It Sleep"	2016	—	—	—	—		The Black
"Here I Am"	2016	—	11	—	— (Note: "Here I Am" did not enter the Hot Rock & Alternative Songs chart, but peaked at number 16 on the Hard Rock Digital Song Sales chart.)		The Black
"Into the Fire"	2017	—	13	—	18	RIAA: Gold	Asking Alexandria
"Where Did It Go?"	2017	—	—	—	50		Asking Alexandria
"Alone in a Room"	2018	—	7	—	33	RIAA: Gold	Asking Alexandria
"Vultures"	2018	—	9	—	—		Asking Alexandria
"The Violence"	2019	—	—	25	46		Like a House on Fire
"They Don't Want What We Want (And They Don't Care)"	2020	—	7	17	—		Like a House on Fire
"Antisocialist"	2020	—	3	6	26		Like a House on Fire
"Down to Hell"	2020	—	—	—	—		Like a House on Fire
"House on Fire"	2020	—	—	—	—		Like a House on Fire
"Alone Again"	2021	—	1	7	— (Note: "Alone Again" did not enter the Hot Rock & Alternative Songs chart, but peaked at number 10 on the Rock & Alternative Airplay chart.)		See What's on the Inside
"Never Gonna Learn"	2022	—	6	17	—		See What's on the Inside
"Faded Out" (solo or with Within Temptation)	2022	—	14	—	—		See What's on the Inside
"Dark Void"	2023	—	6	15	—		Where Do We Go from Here?
"Psycho"	2023	—	1	14	—		Where Do We Go from Here?
"Bad Blood"	2023	—	—	—	—		Where Do We Go from Here?
"—" denotes a recording that did not chart or was not released in that territory.

=== As featured artist ===
Title	Year	Peak chart positions	Album	Label
Title	Year	US Main.	Album	Label
"Kneel Before Me" (Slander and Crankdat featuring Asking Alexandria)	2018	—	Non-album single	Monstercat, Sumerian
"The Retaliators (21 Bullets)" (The Retaliators featuring Mötley Crüe, Asking Alexandria, Ice Nine Kills and From Ashes to New)	2022	15	The Retaliators	Better Noise

=== Other charted songs ===
Title	Year	Peak chart positions	Album
Title	Year	US Hard Rock	Album
"Where Do We Go from Here?"	2023	10	Where Do We Go from Here?

== Music videos ==
Title	Year	Director	Link
"Final Episode (Let's Change the Channel)"	2009	Robby Starbuck	
"A Prophecy"	2010	Robby Starbuck	
"If You Can't Ride Two Horses at Once... You Should Get Out of the Circus"	2010	Nicholas Scott Chiasson	
"Closure"	2011	Thunder Down Country	
"To the Stage"	2011	Frankie Nasso	
"Not the American Average"	2011	Frankie Nasso	
"Reckless & Relentless"	2012	Frankie Nasso	
"Dear Insanity"	2012	Frankie Nasso	
"Breathless"	2012	Frankie Nasso	
"The Death of Me" (Rock mix)	2013	Frankie Nasso	
"Run Free"	2013	Frankie Nasso	
"Killing You"	2013	Frankie Nasso	
"Moving On"	2014	Samuel Brownfield	
"I Won't Give In"	2015	Steven Contreras	
"The Black"	2016	Ramon Boutviseth	
"Let It Sleep"	2016	Ramon Boutviseth	
"Here I Am"	2016	Steven Contreras	
"Into the Fire"	2017	Jensen Noen	
"Alone in a Room"	2018	Steven Contreras	
"Vultures"	2018	T.G. Hopkins	
"The Violence"	2019	Jensen Noen	
"Antisocialist"	2020	Frankie Nasso	
"Alone Again"	2021	William "Wombat" Felch	
"Never Gonna Learn"	2021	William "Wombat" Felch	
"Faded Out"	2022	Michael Lombardi	
"See What's on the Inside"	2022	William "Wombat" Felch	
"Dark Void"	2023	William "Wombat" Felch	
"Psycho"	2023	William "Wombat" Felch	
"Let Go"	2023	William "Wombat" Felch	

== Other appearances ==
Song	Year	Album
"Right Now (Na Na Na)" (Akon cover)	2010	Punk Goes Pop Volume 03.
"Closer" (Nine Inch Nails cover)	2014	Punk Goes 90s Vol. 2
"Duality" (Slipknot cover)	2016	Metal Hammer: Decades of Destruction
"Famous Last Words" (My Chemical Romance cover)	2016	Rock Sound Presents: The Black Parade
