= Alone Again (Asking Alexandria song) =

2021 song by Asking Alexandria

Single by Asking Alexandria

from the album See What's on the Inside
- Released: August 20, 2021
- Length: 3:48
- Label: Better Noise
- Composers: Matt Good; Cameron Liddell; Danny Worsnop; Ben Bruce; Sam Bettley; James Cassells
- Producer: Good

Asking Alexandria singles chronology
"House on Fire" (2020)	"Alone Again" (2021)	"Never Gonna Learn" (2022)

Music video
- "Alone Again" on YouTube

"Alone Again" is a song by English rock band Asking Alexandria. It is the band's first single from their seventh studio album, See What's on the Inside, and was their first release after the band signed with Better Noise Music. It was their first No. 1 single on the Billboard Mainstream Rock Airplay chart.

== Background and release ==
Guitarist Ben Bruce said that "Alone Again" and the rest of the album resulted from the band reconnecting with why they started the band. He said that, at some point in their lives, "we all feel lost and confused" about who we are and who we want to be, and that he thought the song would "really unite all of us" in that sense. Bruce also said the band had gone back to their roots as musicians and wanted to "reignite" their passion and love for rock and metal music. In a Billboard interview, Bruce noted that "Alone Again" was also the title of a song by Dokken. He also noted that "Into the Fire", the first single from Asking Alexandria's self-titled album, was likewise the title of a Dokken song.

The official music video, directed by Wombat Fire, was released on August 31, 2021. Following the song's release, Bruce said he thought it might have received the most positive initial reaction that Asking Alexandria had experienced for a single.

== Composition ==
Bruce said that the opening guitar riff of "Alone Again" was the first riff the band wrote together in the studio during the recording of the album. It was the first time all five members had been in a studio together since 2010. He said the riff "set the tone" for the album. Discussing the guitar solo on the track, Bruce said he wanted it to sound "cool" while remaining attainable for guitarists who were still learning. He said he considered whether the solo was memorable and whether people would want to learn it, and wanted them to feel good after learning it. Bruce added that the solo was the first one he wrote for the album and that writing it made him excited about guitar solos again. He said the solo "shaped the record" and pushed him to develop his abilities as a guitarist. All five members of the band are credited as co-writers on the track, which also uses live strings.

== Reception ==
Jack Rogers of Rock Sound described "Alone Again" as a dramatic and theatrical song, saying its riffs were "made to be played on the world's biggest stages", its vocals were harsh and harmonious, and its guitar solo was "pulled straight from the sunset strip". Emily Carter of Kerrang! described the song as a return to the band's more metal roots following their 2020 album Like a House on Fire, while Jake Richardson, reviewing the album for the magazine, described the track as a "bombastic rocker" that was "far more dramatic" than most of the band's catalogue and said it had more in common with Ghost than with metalcore. Metal Hammer noted that it contained "clear nods" to their early metalcore roots. Wall of Sound described the track as drawing out "cutting edge cleans" from Worsnop and featuring a "punchy rock melody" that it said was "in key" with Escape the Fate and Papa Roach. In a later album review, Tamara May called "Alone Again" Asking Alexandria's "strongest single" in the previous few years and said it hinted at a more mature version of the band. NME described "Alone Again" as a "powerful, emotionally-charged anthem", while Loudwire characterized it as a "raw and emotionally powerful rock anthem". Blabbermouth.net described the song as a "guitar-driven" rock anthem with "moving lyrics" and "soaring melodies".

== Track listing ==
"Alone Again" single
No.	Title	Length
1.	"Intro"	0:56
2.	"Alone Again"	3:48
Total length:		4:45

== Personnel ==
Credits adapted from Apple Music.

Asking Alexandria

- Danny Worsnop – lead vocals
- Ben Bruce – lead guitar, backing vocals
- Cameron Liddell – rhythm guitar
- Sam Bettley – bass
- James Cassells – drums

Additional personnel

- Hannah Huntley – vocals
- Brandon Michael Collins – string arrangement
- Matt Good – production, mixing
- Benjamin Bynum – engineering
- Howie Weinberg – mastering
- Will Borza – mastering

== Chart performance ==
On the Billboard Mainstream Rock Airplay chart, "Alone Again" became Asking Alexandria's first number-one single on the chart dated November 13, 2021. It was the band's first leader among 11 charted titles after eight years of appearances on the chart.

=== Weekly charts ===
Chart (2021)	Peak position
US Rock & Alternative Airplay (Billboard)	10
US Mainstream Rock Airplay (Billboard)	1
