= It's Now or Never (album) =

Studio album by Make Me Famous
- Released: March 26, 2012
- Recorded: Late 2010—early 2012 at "Galomnee Foundation" Studio in Donetsk, Ukraine
- Genre: Metalcore; electronicore; post-hardcore
- Length: 53:58
- Label: Sumerian
- Producer: Denis Shaforostov; Serj Kravchenko; Jimmy X Rose

Make Me Famous chronology
Keep This in Your Music Player (2011)	It's Now or Never (2012)

It's Now or Never is the only studio album by Ukrainian metalcore band Make Me Famous, which was released in March 2012 through Sumerian Records. It was released on the US label Sumerian Records. The album was produced by Serj Kravchenko and Denis Shaforostov, who are also members of the band.

A total of 30 songs were written for this album, of which only 14 were selected. The song "Make It Precious" was recorded as an acoustic version and included as a bonus track. A month before the US release date on March 27, 2012, "It's Now or Never" could be pre-ordered from stores like Merchconnect as a bundle with a T-shirt. Seventeen days after its US release, the album was finally released worldwide on April 13, 2012. To promote the album, the band supported For Today on their Fight the Silence Tour, which included 34 concerts.

The sound is strongly reminiscent of the music of the British metalcore band Asking Alexandria. The album entered the charts in April, reaching number 151 on the US Billboard charts. The album received mostly negative reviews on several online platforms.

== Critical reception ==
Professional ratings
Review scores
Source	Rating
About.com	0.5/5 stars
Under the Gun Review	7/10
Me Gusta Reviews	2.5/5 stars

The album received mixed reviews. James Shotwell from Under the Gun Review said, "Overall, the record is not bad, and there are certainly some very notable tracks. I just can’t get over the fact that they sound so much like Asking Alexandria, who I love by the way, and it somewhat bothers me that they remind me of them so much. When looking for a new band to sink my teeth into I try to look for unique songs, clever lyrics and solid musicianship. I can find some of these elements, and this band has great potential, but I’m not sure they have made it there quite yet."

Todd Lyons from About.com strongly criticized the album saying, "Make Me Famous, with their debut It's Now Or Never, have become famous by igniting high-octane hatred across the metal diaspora. Hundreds of metal blogs agree, Make Me Famous is worse than a hot lead high colonic, . . . are they THAT bad? Yes."

== Track listing ==
No.	Title	Length
1.	"Blind Date 101"	3:48
2.	"Make It Precious"	4:06
3.	"It's Now or Never"	1:12
4.	"Inception" (featuring Tyler Carter)	3:16
5.	"This Song Is Blacker Than Black Metal"	3:36
6.	"We Know It's Real"	4:44
7.	"In the Shadows of You"	2:12
8.	"Once You Killed a Cow, You Gotta Make a Burger"	2:55
9.	"Stage on Fire"	3:13
10.	"She Hunted Me"	4:19
11.	"Ifyuocnaraedtihsmkaemeasnadwich"	4:18
12.	"I Am a Traitor" (featuring Johnny Franck)	4:08
13.	"Earth"	4:40
14.	"Quit Sleeping! It's Nothing But a Waste of Time"	3:03
15.	"Make It Precious" (live; bonus track)	4:28
Total length:		53:58

== Personnel ==
- "It's Now or Never" credits adapted from AllMusic.

Make Me Famous

- Serj Kravchenko – growled vocals
- Denis Shaforostov – clean vocals, screamed vocals, lead guitar, programming
- Sergei Hohlov – bass guitar, gang vocals, vocals on track 11
- Jimmy X Rose – rhythm guitar, drum programming

Production

- Denis Shaforostov – Engineer, Mastering, Mixing, producer
- Serj Kravchenko – Artwork, Concept, Design, engineer, Mastering, Mixing, producer
- Derek Brewer – Management
- Brian Judge – Management
- Ash Avildsen – Booking

== Chart positions ==
Chart (2012)	Peak position
US Billboard 200	151
US Independent Albums (Billboard)	26
US Top Hard Rock Albums (Billboard)	13
US Heatseekers Albums (Billboard)	5
US Top Rock Albums (Billboard)	37
