= Stepped Up and Scratched =

Remix album by Asking Alexandria
- Released: 21 November 2011
- Genre: Dubstep; electronicore; drum and bass
- Length: 72:07
- Label: Sumerian
- Producer: Joey Sturgis

Asking Alexandria chronology
Reckless & Relentless (2011)	Stepped Up and Scratched (2011)	Under the Influence: A Tribute to the Legends of Hard Rock (2012)

Singles from Stepped Up and Scratched
- 1. "Final Episode (Let's Change the Channel) (Borgore Remix)" Released: 19 April 2011; 2. "Another Bottle Down (Tomba Remix)" Released: 24 October 2011; 3. "A Lesson Never Learned (Celldweller Remix)" Released: 1 November 2011; 4. "Reckless & Relentless (Document One Remix)" Released: 10 November 2011

Stepped Up and Scratched is a remix album by English rock band Asking Alexandria. After many delayed scheduled releases, it was released on 21 November 2011 through Sumerian Records. It includes remixes done by Borgore, Sol Invicto, Celldweller, Big Chocolate, KC Blitz and more.

Borgore's remix of "Final Episode (Let's Change the Channel)" was released as a digital single on 19 April 2011, as a promotional iTunes single back when the album was set for release in July 2011. Since then the album was again pushed back, and at some point believed to be shelved. In October 2011, it was announced that the album will be finally released on 21 November 2011, with Sumerian Records revealing the track list and cover art of the album. Tomba's remix of "Another Bottle Down" was released for free listening on Sumerian Records' YouTube channel, though it wasn't an official single.

The first official single from the album was announced to be Celldweller's remix of "A Lesson Never Learned" which was set for a 1 November 2011, release. The Document One remix of "Reckless & Relentless" was premiered on Hot Topic's website on 10 November 2011.

== Track listing ==
No.	Title	Length
1.	"A Single Moment of Sincerity" (KC Blitz Remix)	4:33
2.	"Another Bottle Down" (Tomba Remix)	4:09
3.	"Reckless & Relentless" (Document One Remix)	5:18
4.	"I Was Once, Possibly, Maybe, Perhaps a Cowboy King" (Robotsonics Remix)	5:31
5.	"To the Stage" (Bare Remix)	3:29
6.	"A Lesson Never Learned" (Celldweller Remix)	3:45
7.	"Final Episode (Let's Change the Channel)" (Borgore Remix)	4:12
8.	"A Candlelit Dinner with Inamorta" (Run DMT Remix)	4:14
9.	"If You Can't Ride Two Horses at Once... You Should Get Out of the Circus" (Noah D Remix)	3:53
10.	"I Used to Have a Best Friend (But Then He Gave Me an STD)" (Big Chocolate Remix)	4:45
11.	"Dear Insanity" (Revaleso Remix)	4:38
12.	"Not the American Average" (J. Rabbit Remix)	4:55
13.	"Morte et Dabo" (Sol Invicto Remix)	5:25
14.	"Closure" (Mecha Remix)	4:10
15.	"A Prophecy" (Big Chocolate Remix)	4:27
16.	"A Lesson Never Learned" (Sol Invicto Remix)	4:41
Total length:		72:07

== Personnel ==
Credits adapted from AllMusic.

Asking Alexandria

- Danny Worsnop – lead vocals, keyboards, programming
- Ben Bruce – lead guitar, backing vocals, keyboards, programming
- Cameron Liddell – rhythm guitar
- Sam Bettley – bass
- James Cassells – drums

Additional musicians

- Celldweller – additional production, remixing
- Tomba – additional production, remixing
- Document One – additional production, remixing
- Joe Buras and Lee McKinney of Born of Osiris – remixing
- KC Blitz – remixing
- Borgore – remixing
- Sol Invicto – remixing
- Eric "Bobo" Correa – remixing
- A.J. Cookson – remixing
- Robotsonics – remixing
- Bare – remixing
- Run DMT – remixing
- Noah D – remixing
- Big Chocolate – remixing
- Revaleso – remixing
- J. Rabbit – remixing
- Mecha – remixing

Additional personnel

- Joey Sturgis – production, engineering, mixing, mastering
- Amanda Fiore – executive production, A&R, booking
- Will Putney – mastering
- Ash Avildsen – booking
- Nick Walters – A&R
- Phill Mamula – cover photo
- George Vallee – publicity

== Charts ==
=== Weekly charts ===
Chart (2011)	Peak position
US Top Dance Albums (Billboard)	5

=== Year-end charts ===
Chart (2012)	Position
US Top Dance/Electronic Albums (Billboard)	23
