= I Won't Give In =

Single by Asking Alexandria

from the album The Black
- Released: 27 May 2015
- Genre: Post-hardcore
- Length: 3:49
- Label: Sumerian
- Songwriter(s): Ben Bruce; James Cassells; Denis Shaforstov; Joey Sturgis
- Producer(s): Joey Sturgis

Asking Alexandria singles chronology
"Someone, Somewhere (Popkong remix)" (2015)	"I Won't Give In" (2015)	"Undivided" (2015)

Music video
- "I Won't Give In" on YouTube

"I Won't Give In" is a song by English rock band Asking Alexandria. It was released on 27 May 2015 as the first single from their fourth studio album The Black. It marks the first song featuring new frontman Denis Stoff after the departure of former vocalist Danny Worsnop in January 2015.

== Background and lyrics ==
After former vocalist Danny Worsnop's departure in early 2015, the band have replaced him with Denis Stoff (former member of Make Me Famous and Down & Dirty). Bruce has stated that the departure of Worsnop was "inevitable" and that Worsnop has no longer cared about the band. The lyrics of this song are believed to be written towards Worsnop as confirmed by guitarist Ben Bruce. Worsnop had a positive response, saying "Glad to hear shit's still going strong".

== Music video ==
The band have released a lyric video for the song on 27 May 2015 on their YouTube channel to announce the new single. On 23 September 2015, the band have released the music video for the song made from footage collected from the band playing Vans Warped Tour.

== Personnel ==
- Denis Stoff – lead vocals
- Ben Bruce – lead guitar, backing vocals
- Cameron Liddell – rhythm guitar
- Sam Bettley – bass
- James Cassells – drums

== Charts ==
Chart (2014)	Peak position
US Mainstream Rock (Billboard)	16
US Rock Digital Songs (Billboard)	26

== Certifications ==
Region	Certification	Certified units/sales
United States (RIAA)	Gold	500,000^{‡}
^{‡} Sales+streaming figures based on certification alone.
