= Here I Am (Asking Alexandria song) =

Single by Asking Alexandria

from the album The Black
- Released: 18 March 2016
- Recorded: 2015
- Genre: Alternative metal
- Length: 4:19
- Label: Sumerian
- Songwriters: Ben Bruce, Denis Stoff
- Producer: Joey Sturgis

Asking Alexandria singles chronology
"Let It Sleep" (2016)	"Here I Am" (2016)	"Into the Fire" (2017)

Music video
- "Here I Am" on YouTube

"Here I Am" is a song by English rock band Asking Alexandria. It was released on 18 March 2016 as the fifth and final single from their album The Black. It is also their final single with Denis Stoff as lead vocalist.

== Song meaning ==
In a track-by-track commentary video released by the band, lead guitarist and primary songwriter Ben Bruce stated about the song:

"We're not shying behind anything, like, 'Here I am, this is me, I'm fucking screaming at the top of my lungs, I'm not trying to hide behind a false ideology: this is who I am, this is what I've been through,' and it kind of encompasses this whole record. It's a very honest, open record, and it's like you can see what we've been through releasing this record, and that's what this song's about, and it's kinda like 'I'm here, my hands are up, I'm not hiding anything, I'm not fucking wearing any clothes, I'm fucking fully naked, this is me.' There's no twists, there's no nothing. What you see is what you get, and what we're telling you is the truth, as naked and as raw, and as natural, and as everything as it gets.""

== Music video ==
The video for the single directed by Steven Contreras was released in May 2016. It features the band performing in a field, and images of a girl and a hooded figure with a mask.

== Charts ==
Chart (2016)	Peak position
US Rock & Alternative Airplay (Billboard)	35
US Mainstream Rock (Billboard)	11
