= See What's on the Inside =

Studio album by Asking Alexandria
- Released: 1 October 2021
- Genres: Hard rock; heavy metal; alternative rock; alternative metal
- Length: 40:02
- Label: Better Noise
- Producer: Matt Good

Asking Alexandria chronology
Like a House on Fire (2020)	See What's on the Inside (2021)	Where Do We Go from Here? (2023)

Singles from See What's on the Inside
- 1. "Alone Again" Released: 20 August 2021; 2. "Never Gonna Learn" Released: 21 January 2022; 3. "Faded Out" Released: 25 June 2022

See What's on the Inside is the seventh studio album by English rock band Asking Alexandria. The album was released on 1 October 2021 through Better Noise Music and was produced by Matt Good. The album is the first release from the band under Better Noise Music.

== Background and promotion ==
On 7 June 2021, the band announced that they signed to Better Noise Music. On 20 August, the band surprise released a brand new single "Alone Again". At the same time, the band revealed the album itself, the album cover, the track list, and release date. Guitarist Ben Bruce commented about the track: "'Alone Again' and the rest of this album is the result of us reconnecting and falling back in love with why we started this band in the first place. No frills or cheap tricks, just the five of us playing our instruments as hard and as loud as we can!"

On 31 August, the band unveiled the official music video for "Alone Again". On 23 September, one week before the album release, the band teased on their social media the song "Faded Out" which would be available on 1 October. To promote the album, the band also announced that they will support A Day to Remember's rescheduled "The Re-Entry Tour" along with Point North in September 2021. On 27 September, the group announced their headlining European/UK Tour 2022 to support the album. On 1 October, in celebration of the album release, the band debuted the music video for the song "Never Gonna Learn".

On 20 May 2022, the band released the official music video of an alternate version of "Faded Out", with Sharon den Adel from the Dutch symphonic metal band Within Temptation as a guest singer. This version is featured in the movie The Retaliators.

== Critical reception ==
Professional ratings
Review scores
Source	Rating
Kerrang!	3/5 stars
Metal Hammer	4/5 stars
Wall of Sound	7.5/10

The album received generally positive reviews from critics. Kerrang! gave the album 3 out of 5 and stated: "Ultimately, though, it's when Asking Alexandria dial up the drama like they do on 'Alone Again', the title-track, and cataclysmic closing number 'The Grey' that See What's on the Inside really takes flight. It's proof that Danny and co. have it in them to be far more than a polished radio-rock outfit, and if they harness that spectacle and theatre even more going forward, they could take on an intriguing, exciting form indeed." Metal Hammer gave the album a positive review and stated: "This is the outrageously infectious sound of a band revelling in their influences and the creativity they inspire." Wall of Sound gave the album the score 7.5/10 and saying: "See What's on the Inside sees Asking Alexandria make a promising return to familiarity, producing some of their strongest tracks in the past four years. I definitely found this album a little more rounded and enjoyable than last year's release and you can tell that they've stripped it back, honed in on their roots and thought real hard about where they'd like to see themselves in the scene from here. No longer the same band from 2009, Asking Alexandria have established their musical style down melodically-driven paths and pulling at some deep emotions which will leave you feeling inspired. While they're yet to find that perfect harmony in their music to please everyone, this album does push them forward in the right direction for future releases."

== Track listing ==
All lyrics are written by Asking Alexandria; all music is composed by Asking Alexandria.

See What's on the Inside track listing
No.	Title	Length
1.	"Intro"	0:56
2.	"Alone Again"	3:48
3.	"Faded Out"	3:05
4.	"Never Gonna Learn"	3:18
5.	"If I Could Erase It"	4:11
6.	"Find Myself"	4:40
7.	"You've Made It This Far"	4:21
8.	"See What's on the Inside"	4:36
9.	"Misery Loves Company"	4:03
10.	"Fame"	3:18
11.	"The Grey"	3:46
Total length:		40:02

Deluxe edition
No.	Title	Length
12.	"New Devil" (featuring Maria Brink of In This Moment)	3:34
13.	"Miles Away"	4:33
14.	"Faded Out" (new version; featuring Within Temptation)	3:05
15.	"See What's on the Inside" (acoustic)	4:03
16.	"Never Gonna Learn" (acoustic)	3:06
17.	"Find Myself" (acoustic)	3:32
18.	"Faded Out" (acoustic)	2:43
19.	"Alone Again" (acoustic)	2:19
Total length:		66:57

== Personnel ==
Asking Alexandria

- Danny Worsnop – lead vocals
- Ben Bruce – lead guitar, backing vocals, vocals on track 13
- Cameron Liddell – rhythm guitar
- Sam Bettley – bass, piano
- James Cassells – drums

Additional personnel

- Matt Good – production, mixing
- Benjamin Bynum – engineering

== Charts ==
Chart performance for See What's on the Inside
Chart (2021)	Peak position
German Albums (Offizielle Top 100)	50
Swiss Albums (Schweizer Hitparade)	79
UK Independent Albums (Official Charts)	16
UK Rock & Metal Albums (Official Charts)	10
US Top Album Sales (Billboard)	43
US Top Hard Rock Albums (Billboard)	22
