= Under the Influence: A Tribute to the Legends of Hard Rock =

EP by Asking Alexandria
- Released: 28 November 2012
- Genre: Hard rock; glam metal
- Length: 26:40
- Label: Sumerian
- Producer: Joey Sturgis

Asking Alexandria chronology
Stepped Up and Scratched (2011)	Under the Influence: A Tribute to the Legends of Hard Rock (2012)	From Death to Destiny (2013)

Singles from Under the Influence: A Tribute to the Legends of Hard Rock
- 1. "Run Free" Released: 13 August 2012

Under the Influence: A Tribute to the Legends of Hard Rock is the third EP by English rock band Asking Alexandria. It was released on 28 November 2012 by Sumerian Records and contains several covers of hard rock bands' songs as well as an original song titled "Run Free." "Run Free" was released as a single from the EP.

Professional ratings
Review scores
Source	Rating
Artistdirect	4/5 stars
Get eXposed Music	C−

== Track listing ==
No.	Title	Length
1.	"Separate Ways (Worlds Apart)" (Journey cover)	5:23
2.	"Kickstart My Heart" (Mötley Crüe cover)	4:20
3.	"Here I Go Again" (Whitesnake cover)	4:32
4.	"Hysteria" (Def Leppard cover)	5:25
5.	"Run Free"	4:13
Total length:		26:40

== Personnel ==
Asking Alexandria

- Danny Worsnop – lead vocals, keyboards, programming
- Ben Bruce – lead guitar, backing vocals, keyboards, programming
- Cameron Liddell – rhythm guitar
- Sam Bettley – bass
- James Cassells – drums

Additional personnel

- Joey Sturgis – production on track 5
