= Into the Fire (Asking Alexandria song) =

Single by Asking Alexandria

from the album Asking Alexandria
- Released: 21 September 2017
- Recorded: 2017
- Studio: Good Sounds Studio, Tempe, Arizona, U.S.
- Length: 3:57
- Label: Sumerian
- Songwriters: Danny Worsnop; Ben Bruce; James Cassells; Matt Good
- Producer: Matt Good

Asking Alexandria singles chronology
"Here I Am" (2016)	"Into the Fire" (2017)	"Where Did It Go?" (2017)

"Into the Fire" is a song by English rock band Asking Alexandria. It is the band's first single off of their self-titled fifth studio album, and to feature lead vocalist Danny Worsnop since his departure in 2015. He returned in October 2016, after the departure of former vocalist Denis Stoff. The single was released on 21 September 2017 by the label, Sumerian Records. The song was used in a trailer for the racing game "MX vs. ATV All Out", which was released on 27 March 2018.

== Musical style and themes ==
Loudwire described the song as having "punchy, downtuned rhythms and forceful drumming" in the background with Worsnop's clean, melodic singings over the top of it. In addition to the traditional rock elements, synthesized electronic "whoa-oh" sound effects play over parts of the song.

== Track listing ==
Digital download – 1st version, 7"
No.	Title	Length
1.	"Into the Fire" (Album Version)	3:57
2.	"Into the Fire" (Radio Edit)	3:30

Digital download – 2nd version
No.	Title	Length
1.	"Into the Fire"	3:57
2.	"Into the Fire" (Acoustic Version)	3:28
3.	"Into the Fire" (Radio Edit)	3:30

== Personnel ==
- Danny Worsnop – lead vocals, additional guitar
- Ben Bruce – lead guitar, backing vocals
- Cameron Liddell – rhythm guitar
- Sam Bettley – bass
- James Cassells – drums

== Charts ==
Chart (2017)	Peak position
US Mainstream Rock Airplay (Billboard)	13
US Hot Rock & Alternative Songs (Billboard)	18
US Rock & Alternative Airplay (Billboard)	43

== Certifications ==
Region	Certification	Certified units/sales
United States (RIAA)	Gold	500,000^{‡}
^{‡} Sales+streaming figures based on certification alone.
