= The Black (Asking Alexandria album) =

Studio album by Asking Alexandria
- Released: 25 March 2016
- Recorded: 2015
- Genre: Metalcore; heavy metal; post-hardcore
- Length: 47:45
- Label: Sumerian
- Producer: Joey Sturgis

Asking Alexandria chronology
From Death to Destiny (2013)	The Black (2016)	Asking Alexandria (2017)

Singles from The Black
- 1. "I Won't Give In" Released: 27 May 2015; 2. "Undivided" Released: 25 September 2015; 3. "The Black" Released: 2 February 2016; 4. "Let It Sleep" Released: 3 March 2016; 5. "Here I Am" Released: 18 March 2016

The Black is the fourth studio album by English rock band Asking Alexandria. It was released on 25 March 2016 through Sumerian Records and was produced by Joey Sturgis. It is their only album to feature second lead vocalist Denis Stoff, who replaced original lead vocalist Danny Worsnop. Worsnop returned to the band in October 2016. The album was preceded by the singles "I Won't Give In" released on 26 May 2015, "Undivided" released on 25 September 2015, and the album's eponymous track "The Black" released on 2 February 2016. The first song on the album, "Let It Sleep", was released on 3 March 2016, with a music video for the track being released the following day.

Upon release, the album was well received by music critics and fans of the band. However, in light of Stoff's departure from the band five months after the album's release, the fanbase remains divided over its legacy. Ever since the return of Worsnop, all songs from The Black have been omitted from the band's concert setlists, although Worsnop has stated that he wouldn't mind performing the songs live.

== Background ==
On 22 January 2015, former frontman Danny Worsnop announced his departure from the band to focus his work on hard rock band We Are Harlot, however, he stated that the band will continue touring as well. This has been done with the induction of former Down & Dirty and newly introduced Asking Alexandria frontman Denis Stoff. Stoff's Asking Alexandria covers on his YouTube account above92 had drawn the attention of Ben Bruce, with Bruce stating that "it had to be Denis" for whom he was praised for his much greater vocal range and his style which was inspired by Worsnop during the band's early stages, believing he was capable of performing their songs live on a much higher level than his predecessor. Moreover, just like Asking Alexandria, Stoff's previous bands were contracted to Sumerian Records, which may have granted him an easier transition on succeeding Danny Worsnop.

Stoff was also commended by the band and their fans for his enthusiasm towards the band that the remaining members felt had been a missing presence during the past few years with Worsnop as lead vocalist. Ben Bruce, on Danny's gradual loss of interest in performing with the band, stated that his departure was "inevitable" and "needed to happen for… I wanna say a few months, but it’s probably more like a few years." He added, "Danny just stopped caring about Asking Alexandria; his heart wasn’t in it anymore. He didn’t like screaming, he didn’t like heavy music, he didn’t like the fans, he didn’t like anything to do with Asking Alexandria." Bruce felt that Stoff's introduction to the band was "the right choice to make", adding that "[I think Denis is] an incredibly talented vocalist, from the multiple wide range of screams that Asking Alexandria obviously needs and will continue to have, and his singing and range is out of this world. He's been a fan of the band for a long time, so he's familiar with all our old songs, and he really cares about the band.

The band played at Rock am Ring and Warped Tour 2015 to promote "I Won't Give In".

== Composition ==
Ben Bruce stated that The Black was influenced by Guns N' Roses and Van Halen just as much as modern bands such as Avenged Sevenfold and Slipknot, and contained "some huge arena rock songs".

According to Stoff, he aimed to maintain his distinct vocal style without imitating Danny Worsnop, trying to distinguish himself from his predecessor.

== Release and promotion ==
Prior to the announcement of their forthcoming album, their first single "I Won't Give In" was released on YouTube on 26 May 2015, officially declaring Denis Stoff as the band's new lead singer. The second single was "Undivided", which was previously leaked a few days before the actual release date, but was officially released on 25 September 2015.

Later in December 2015, the band announced the title of their upcoming album to be The Black, also confirming the release date as being 25 March 2016.

In January 2016, Ben Bruce launched a poll on his Twitter page, offering the possibility of the band releasing a new song in anticipation of the British Invasion tour with Welsh heavy metal band Bullet for My Valentine in the United States between February and March 2016. Due to the poll's results unanimously requesting that the single be released, the band's self-titled third single from the album, "The Black" was premiered on BBC Radio 1 on 31 January 2016, with a music video being released for the single on the following day, along with an iTunes release on 30 March 2016. The song is a slight variation on the band's signature sound, featuring melodic vocals from guitarist Ben Bruce.

A music video for "Let It Sleep" was released on 4 March 2016. Following this, the song "Here I Am" premiered on Octane (Sirius XM) Radio on 8 March 2016.

== Critical reception ==
Professional ratings
Aggregate scores
Source	Rating
Metacritic	(90/100)
Review scores
Source	Rating
AllMusic	3.5/5 stars
Alternative Press	4/5 stars
Rock Sound	8/10 stars
Ultimate Guitar	2.5/5 stars

The Black received positive reviews from music critics. The album holds a 90/100 rating on Metacritic, signifying 'universal acclaim' based on 4 reviews. The Music Melting Pot gave The Black an overwhelmingly positive score of 92% saying 'The Black is the Asking Alexandria album we’ve all been waiting for without ever even knowing it. Asking Alexandria have taken the ongoing story of their evolution, and added a triumphant transitional chapter.' The Metalist praised Stoff's vocals comparing him to former vocalist Danny Worsnop.

Broken Arrow gave it a more mixed review, stating that the album 'goes downhill after the first few songs', giving it a 6/10 overall. Ultimate Guitar also gave it a 2.5/5 stars, criticising some of the lyrics and musicianship.

The band's then-former vocalist Danny Worsnop spoke highly of the album's first single "I Won't Give In" upon its release, commenting: "Glad to hear shit's still going strong."

== Track listing ==
All tracks are written by Denis Stoff, Ben Bruce, Joey Sturgis and James Cassells.

No.	Title	Length
1.	"Let It Sleep"	4:00
2.	"The Black"	4:41
3.	"I Won't Give In"	3:49
4.	"Sometimes It Ends"	4:45
5.	"The Lost Souls"	4:05
6.	"Just a Slave to Rock n' Roll"	3:25
7.	"Send Me Home"	4:18
8.	"We'll Be OK"	3:57
9.	"Here I Am"	4:19
10.	"Gone"	3:17
11.	"Undivided"	3:35
12.	"Circled by the Wolves"	3:29
Total length:		47:45

== Personnel ==
Asking Alexandria

- Denis Stoff – lead vocals (except track 10)
- Ben Bruce – lead guitar, backing vocals, vocals on tracks 2 and 10
- Cameron Liddell – rhythm guitar
- Sam Bettley – bass
- James Cassells – drums

Additional personnel

- Joey Sturgis – production, mastering, mixing, engineering, keyboards, programming, orchestra arrangement (except track 5), choir arrangement
- Chuck Alkazian – drum recording, engineering
- Sam Graves – drum editing

== Charts ==
=== Weekly charts ===
Chart (2016)	Peak position
Australian Albums (ARIA)	4
Austrian Albums (Ö3 Austria)	15
Belgian Albums (Ultratop Flanders)	79
Canadian Albums (Billboard)	14
Finnish Albums (Suomen virallinen lista)	38
German Albums (Offizielle Top 100)	23
New Zealand Albums (RMNZ)	13
Scottish Albums (OCC)	13
Swiss Albums (Schweizer Hitparade)	24
UK Albums (OCC)	15
UK Album Downloads (OCC)	9
UK Independent Albums (OCC)	3
UK Rock & Metal Albums (OCC)	1
US Billboard 200	9
US Top Rock Albums (Billboard)	1

=== Year-end charts ===
Chart (2016)	Position
US Top Rock Albums (Billboard)	70
