= Never Say Never Festival =

Coordinates: 26.3001°N 98.2625°W

- Genre: Pop punk, alternative rock, metalcore, electronic, hip hop
- Dates: March during Spring Break
- Location: Mission, TX
- Years active: 2009–2016
- Founders: DGE Concerts
- Website: nsnfestival.com

Never Say Never Festival was an annual multi-genre music festival in Mission, Texas, United States, which ran from 2009 until 2016. The first Never Say Never festival began on March 18, 2009, with 30 bands on two stages, including Forever the Sickest Kids, Anarbor, NeverShoutNever!, A Skylit Drive, Drop Dead, Gorgeous, LMFAO and The Scene Aesthetic.

The 2010 and 2011 festivals followed on March 17, 2010 and March 15, 2011.

== History ==
The name "Never Say Never" was chosen by festival organizers Zar Castillo and George Culberson in response to acquaintances who assured them they would never be able to establish a festival of this type in South Texas.

The 2010 festival was held on March 17, 2010, featuring 40 bands of different genres on three stages, as well as a vendor village.

== 2016 controversy and demise ==
The final Never Say Never Festival took place on March 16, 2016, at Las Palmas Racepark. The festival was marred by technical issues, high-risk investments and low attendance, which resulted in many of the artists having their sets cut short and not being paid in full for their performances.

In response to the controversy that followed, Matt Carter of Emery hosted an episode of his podcast "Break It Down with Matt Carter" with his bandmates discussing the issue. In a follow-up episode, Carter interviewed promoter Zar Castillo to give Castillo a chance to tell his side of the story and explain what reparations were being made to pay the bands who performed.
