= Make Me Famous (band) =

Ukrainian metalcore band

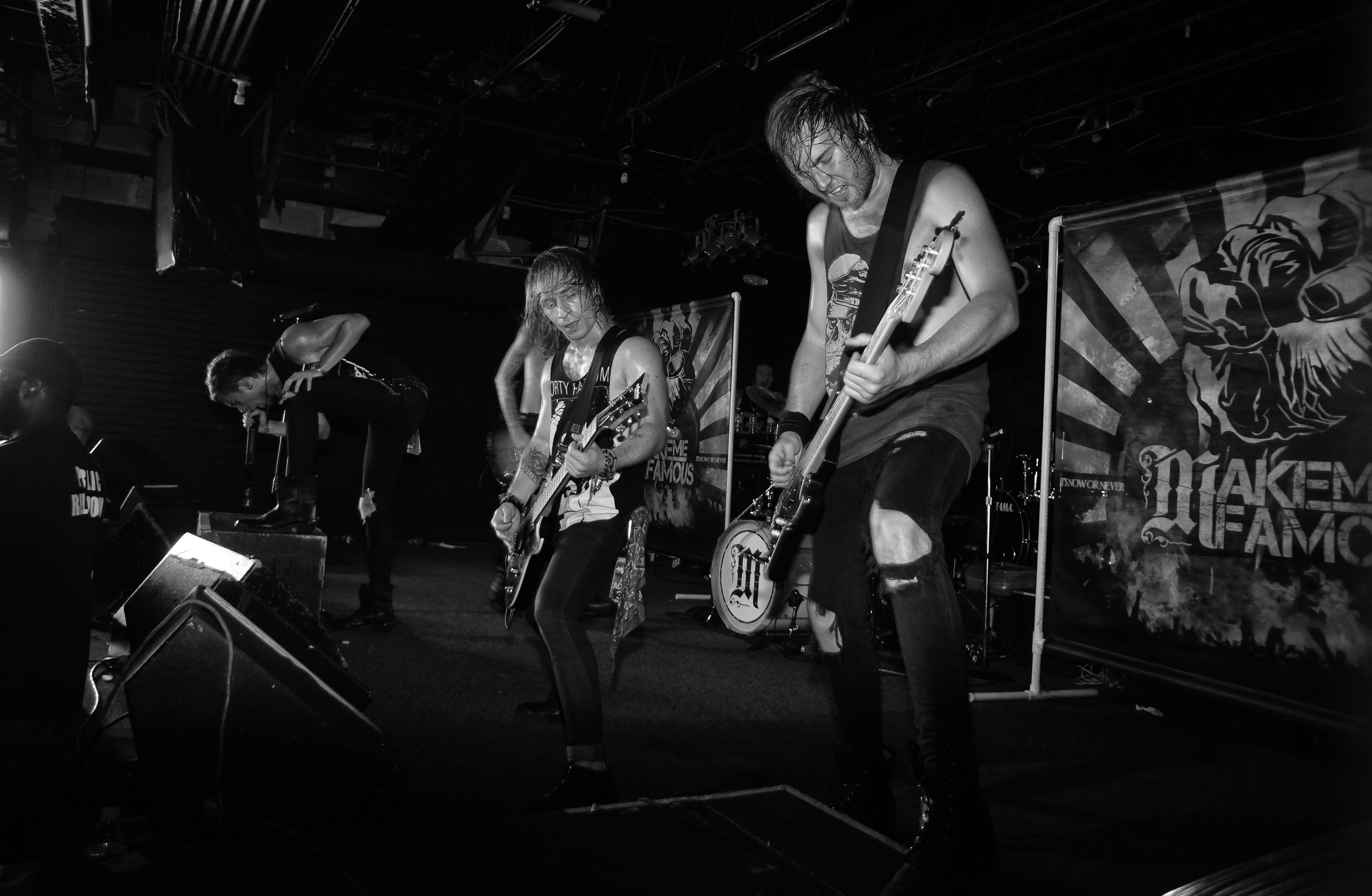
- Make Me Famous performing live in Allentown, Pennsylvania, U.S. in August 2012

Background information
- Origin: Donetsk, Ukraine
- Genres: Metalcore; electronicore; post-hardcore
- Years active: 2010–2012
- Label: Sumerian
- Spinoffs: Pictures Inside Me; Oceans Red; Down & Dirty; Asking Alexandria
- Past members: Denis Shaforostov; Serj Kravchencko; Jimmy X Rose; Sergei Hohlov; Dusty Boles; Jace Thomas

Make Me Famous were a Ukrainian metalcore band. They were founded by lead guitarist and co-vocalist Denis Shaforostov, who gained popularity through his YouTube channel "above92", and songwriter/guitarist Jimmy X Rose. They released one promotional EP and one studio album, titled It's Now or Never, the latter of which was released through Sumerian Records.

== History ==
=== Formation and Keep This in Your Music Player (2010–2011) ===
The band formed in 2010 after Denis Shaforostov uploaded his songs for videos on YouTube. He then recruited bassist Sergei Hohlov to create original music. These two then recruited Igor "Jimmy X Rose" Yastrebov on guitar/songwriting because Shaforostov thought to use 3–4 songs written completely by Yastrebov, in Jimmy and Shaforostov's previous band where they played together. Soon after, Serj Kravchenko, the former vocalist of Pictures Inside Me, joined the band on lead vocals. Jace Thomas was later recruited to play drums, respectively.

In early 2011, the band released an EP titled Keep This in Your Music Player. The EP features the songs "Make It Precious", "I Am A Traitor. No One Does Care" and "Once You Killed a Cow, You Gotta Make a Burger", a cover of Bruno Mars' Just the Way You Are, and the acoustic version of "Make It Precious" all of which except Just the Way You Are were moved over to the band's debut record, but weren't re-recorded for it.

Drummer Jace Thomas was kicked out of the band in 2011 because he allegedly leaked instrumentals of the band's music. He was replaced by American drummer Dusty Boles, who was previously a part of the deathcore band Rose Funeral.

=== It's Now or Never (2011–2012) ===
On September 30, 2011, they officially announced that they were signed to Sumerian Records.

On March 27, 2012, the band released their debut album titled It's Now or Never The album peaked at No. 151 on the Billboard 200, No. 13 on the Hard Rock Albums chart, No. 5 on the Heatseekers Chart, No. 26 on the Top Independent Albums chart, and No. 37 on the Top Rock Albums.

=== Unreleased single and reorganization (2012–2013) ===
The band had begun playing a new song entitled "Locked & Loaded" in 2012, but never reached its final recording stages to be released.

At the end of November 2012, founding member and frontman Denis Shaforostov was kicked out of the band by the other four members, and the band was subsequently dropped from Sumerian Records. The reason was constant conflicts between Shaforostov and the rest of the band. Sumerian Records when announcing that they dropped the band simply stated "It's a shame when band members cannot get along with each other." Make Me Famous then held one final tour without Shaforostov before officially breaking up. The tour concluded in December 2012, signifying the end of the band.

The remaining members, minus Shaforostov, promised to return with a new band. They created a new band called Oceans Red.

== Style and influences ==
Allmusic has described the band as "Ukraine five-piece with a slick approach to metalcore and emo." Common breakdowns are present in the band's music as well as large use of electronics. Screamed and sung vocals were performed by Denis Shaforostov while the low growled vocals were done by Serj Kravchenko. The band's influences include Bruno Mars, Def Leppard, and Asking Alexandria. Kravchenko has cited vocalist Phil Bozeman of Whitechapel as an influence for his growls.

== Band members ==
Final line-up

- Sergei Hohlov – bass guitar (2009–2012)
- Jimmy X Rose – rhythm guitar (2009–2012), lead guitar (2012)
- Serj Kravchenko – growl vocals, keyboards, programming (2010–2012)
- Dusten "Dusty" Boles – drums (2011–2012)

Former members

- Jace Thomas – drums (2010-2011)
- Denis Shaforostov – clean and scream vocals, lead guitar (2009–2012); keyboard, programming (2009–2010)

Timeline

== Discography ==
=== Albums ===
- It's Now or Never (2012)

=== EPs ===
- "Keep This in Your Music Player" (2011)

=== Singles ===
- "Make It Precious" – January 20, 2011
- "I Am A Traitor. No One Does Care" – February 22, 2011
- "Once You Killed A Cow - You Gotta Make A Burger" – April 6, 2011
- "We Know It's Real" – October 4, 2011
- "Blind Date 101" – April 5, 2012

=== Music videos ===
- "Make It Precious" (2011)
- "Make It Precious (Acoustic)" (2011)
- "Blind Date 101" (2012)
