= Denis Stoff =

Ukrainian singer and guitarist

Denis Shaforostov Денис Шафоростов
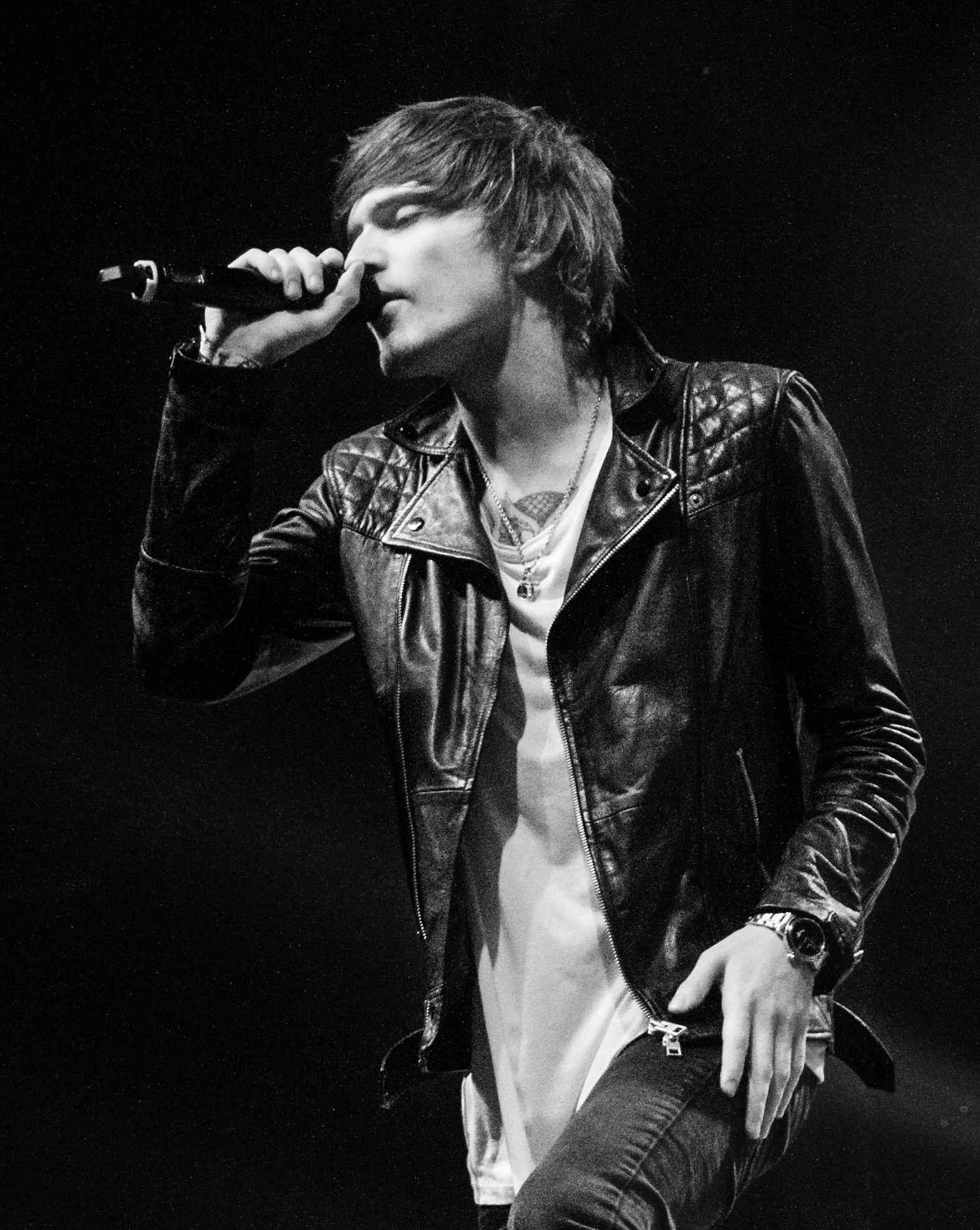
- Shaforostov with Asking Alexandria at Rock am Ring 2015

Background information
- Born: Denis Olexandrovych Shaforostov; 4 May 1992 (age 34); Khartsyzk, Ukraine
- Genres: Metalcore; post-hardcore; electronicore; hard rock; alternative rock; hip-hop
- Occupations: Singer; musician; songwriter
- Instruments: Vocals; guitar
- Years active: 2010–present
- Member of: Drag Me Out; The Serpent's Tears
- Formerly of: Asking Alexandria; Down & Dirty; Make Me Famous; Origami

Denis Olexandrovych Shaforostov (Ukrainian: Денис Олександрович Шафоростов; born 4 May 1992), also known by his stage name Denis Stoff, is a Ukrainian musician, best known for his work as a guitarist and singer of the metalcore group Make Me Famous. He also replaced Danny Worsnop as lead singer of the English rock band Asking Alexandria, during Worsnop's 18-month hiatus from the band.

Shaforostov's music career began with his YouTube channel "above92", where he posted vocal and guitar covers of his favorite songs. He then formed the band Make Me Famous, before becoming involved with Asking Alexandria. He is currently the lead vocalist for the band Drag Me Out, and the guitarist and clean vocalist for the band The Serpent's Tears.

== Career ==
=== 2009–2010: Cat!Cow!MilkyWay! ===
Stoff experimented in electronic music with a short lived project called Cat!Cow!MilkyWay!. He also played as guitarist in the Russian post-hardcore/emo band Origami.

=== 2010–2012: Make Me Famous ===
The first major project Stoff involved himself in was metalcore act Make Me Famous which he helped form in 2010 with members Serj Kravchenko on unclean vocals, Sergei Hohlov on bass, Dusty Boles on drums and Igor Yestrebov on guitar. The band gained recognition on the video sharing website YouTube, where Stoff previously released covers of songs and would eventually gain members after contacting each musician after gaining a following. The band released their debut album "It's Now or Never" in March 2012 via Sumerian Records and successfully charted in the US top 200, peaking at 151.

In late 2012, Stoff had announced that he had quit the band, which itself had announced to be disbanded after their final headlining tour that same year, officially disbanding in early 2013.

=== 2012–2015: Down & Dirty ===
After the news arose that Make Me Famous had broken up, Stoff quickly announced a new band named Down & Dirty. The band was officially announced under the Sumerian label like his last project, and released their first single and music video in December 2013 titled "Move It". The band also released a second single and music video in December 2014 titled "I Will Never Lose My Way". After these songs, Stoff later announced he would be joining Asking Alexandria, which was followed by Down & Dirty confirming he was no longer a part of the group. Down & Dirty continued with a new lead vocalist, Ezekiel Pierson, and released a new single "Heaven Sent" in February 2017.

=== 2015–2016: Asking Alexandria ===
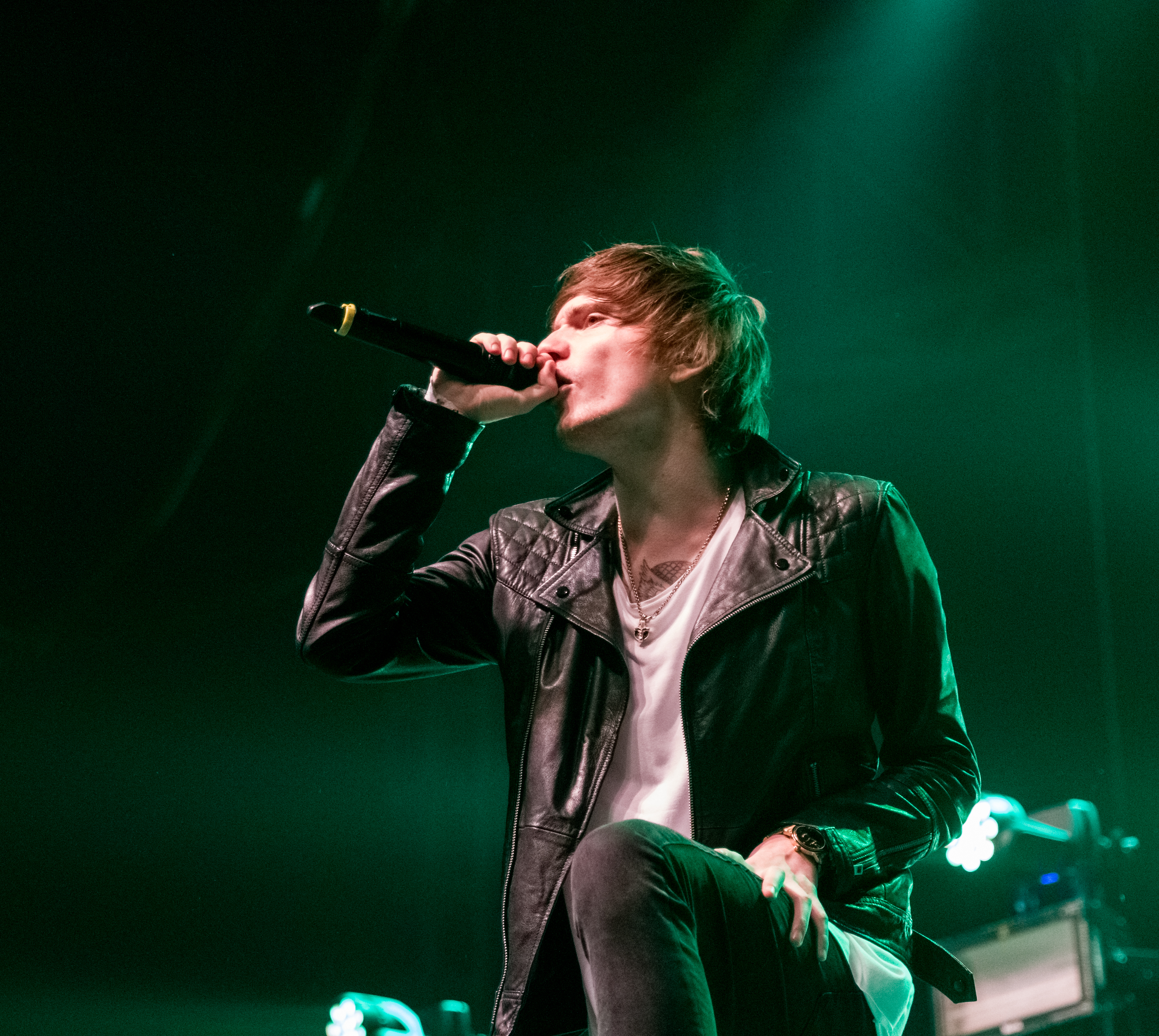
Denis Stoff performing live with Asking Alexandria at Rock am Ring in 2015

On 22 January 2015, lead singer Danny Worsnop announced his departure from Asking Alexandria to focus on his new band We Are Harlot, of which it was quickly stated that his replacement was already found. On 26 May 2015, Stoff was officially announced as the new lead vocalist when they released their first single together titled "I Won't Give In" on 27 May. Speculation regarding Stoff's involvement started shortly after Worsnop's departure due to similarities between Asking Alexandria and Make Me Famous (who were said to have been ripping off the band); the fact that they were label mates would have made the transition easy for Stoff to make, and on his personal YouTube account he had covered multiple Asking Alexandria songs. Ben Bruce was asked if he considered anyone else for the role and he stated that "it has to be Denis" before praising his vocal ability. When Shaforostov himself was asked how he would distinguish himself from Worsnop, he stated he would not make any comparison since he is a completely different person.

In October 2016, Ben Bruce announced that Stoff left the band. In December 2017, Rock Sound interviewed Denis and explained that his home country, Ukraine, is like a warzone now. He said there was stress for him and his family, and he had to stop touring to focus on family.

=== 2017–present: Drag Me Out ===
Stoff posted on Twitter on 27 September 2017 "New album and new band... so worth every minute of the work and da wait we've already invested in this. Be ready for something new and FRESH."

Stoff with his new band Drag Me Out released their first single, titled I'm Sorry, on 15 January 2019. An accompanying music video was also released. On 1 February 2019, the band surprise dropped their debut album Pressure. Shortly after the album's release, connections were made between Drag Me Out's "Hollow" and Asking Alexandria's "Alone in a Room" sounding similar in terms of instruments and the bridge section of the song, afterwards the band's label Sumerian Records (who at the time, were also Asking Alexandria's label) took down the song from their official YouTube channel.

On 30 October 2020, Drag Me Out released a new single "The Watch of the Buried" and its corresponding lyric video. It was revealed on 11 December 2020 that the artwork for this single was plagiarized from an artist named Maxime Taccardia. The artist claims that neither Denis nor the band reached out to him for permission. Denis posted on his social medias about how they would reach out to said artist to discuss how to properly settle this case, claiming that the artwork was sold by a third party artist, who was never disclosed. Since then, the lyric video for the single had been taken down and the artwork had been removed from iTunes. Sumerian Records has since re-uploaded the song with no lyric video or artwork to YouTube.

Denis has also announced that these allegations will not impact the upcoming album that Drag Me Out is working on. Denis has said on multiple occasions (mostly on Instagram stories and other methods that disappear after 24 hours) that this album is going to be a two part album that'll be released throughout 2021. One half will be going back to metalcore roots, the other half will be experimental. Drag Me Out unveiled their new album Demons Away on 26 August, the album was delayed initially from its original release date (6 May 2022). The album reportedly is a trilogy consisting of three parts. The album does not only include Denis Stoff's vocals, but also bassist Kir Medvedev.

=== 2020–present: STOFF ===
Stoff announced in 2018 that he will have a solo project under the moniker "STOFF". The first single was given a release date on 12/19/20 called "Детка Покажи Язык" (Baby Show Me Your Tongue), which marked a departure from his rock roots in favor of a more hip hop sound.

Stoff has also announced a new solo album consisting of English, and Russian language music. The release date has not been announced but it appears that the album is ready and has shared many snippets via Instagram.

Stoff also has done numerous guest features for 2022 including "Isn't Pretend" by LUURK, "1M Followers" by Space of Variations and "Last Second Chance" by Kiss of Betrayal.

== Discography ==
Denis Stoff discography
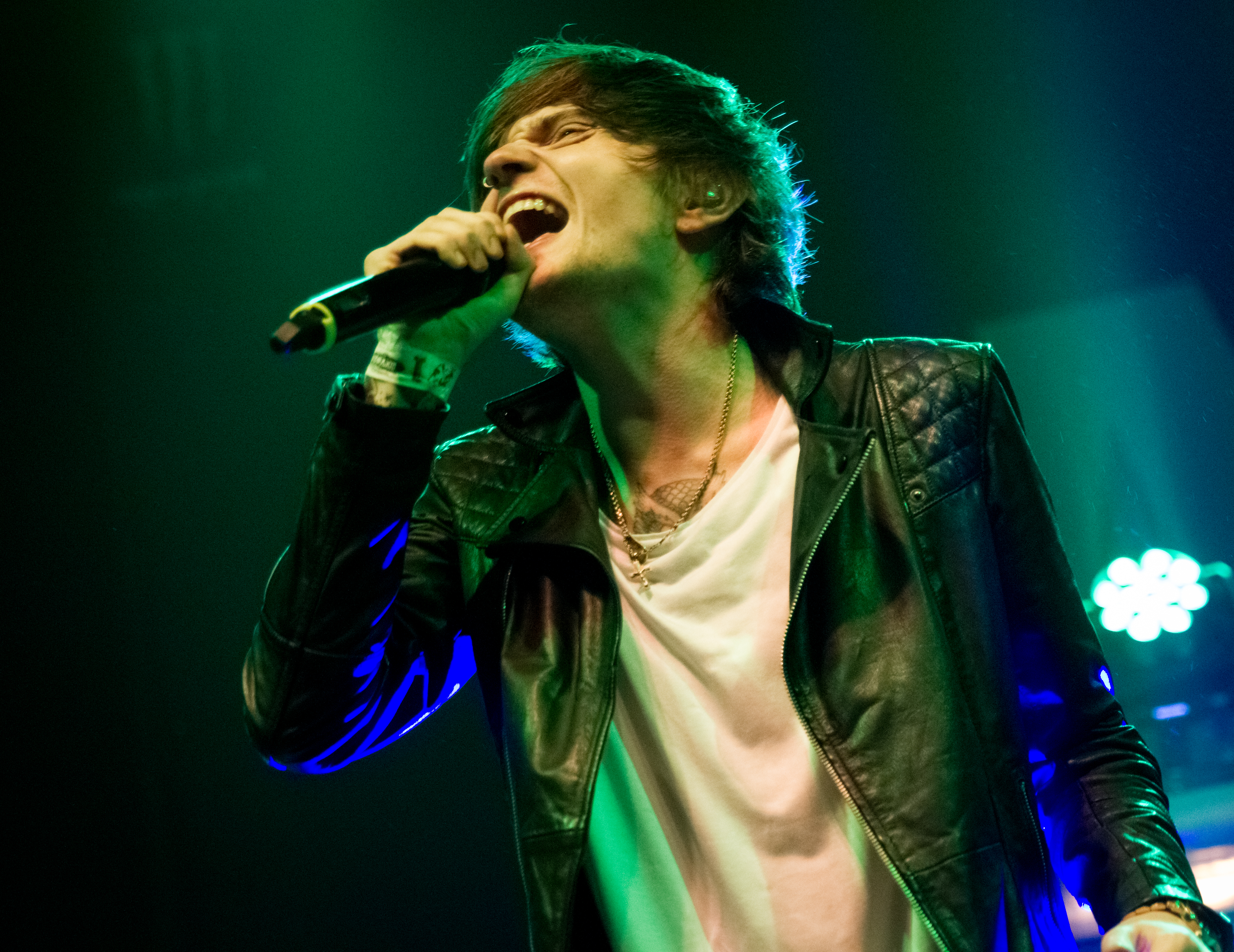
- Studio albums: 4
- EPs: 1
- Singles: 26

=== Albums ===
Title	Year	Band	Type
Keep This in Your Music Player	2011	Make Me Famous	EP
It's Now or Never	2012	Make Me Famous	Studio album
The Black	2016	Asking Alexandria	Studio album
Pressure	2019	Drag Me Out	Studio album
Demons Away	2022	Drag Me Out	Studio album

=== Singles ===
Title	Year	Band
"We Know It's Real"	2011	Make Me Famous
"Move It"	2013	Down & Dirty
"I Will Never Lose My Way"	2015	Down & Dirty
"I Won't Give In"	2015	Asking Alexandria
"Undivided"	2015	Asking Alexandria
"The Black"	2016	Asking Alexandria
"Let It Sleep"	2016	Asking Alexandria
"Here I Am"	2016	Asking Alexandria
"I'm Sorry"	2019	Drag Me Out
"The Watch of the Buried"	2020	Drag Me Out
"Детка Покажи Язык" (Baby Show Me Your Tongue)	2020	STOFF
"Bullets in My Teeth"	2022	Drag Me Out
"Bullets in My Teeth" (Reimagined)	2022	Drag Me Out
"Crystal Arms"	2022	Drag Me Out
"Bullets in My Teeth" (Live Sessions)	2022	Drag Me Out
"The Watch of the Buried" (Live Sessions)	2022	Drag Me Out
"Let Me In"	2022	Drag Me Out
"My Mistakes"	2023	Drag Me Out
"Into the Dire"	2023	STOFF
"The Heart of the Hydra"	2023	STOFF
"Symbol of Hope"	2024	The Serpent's Tears
"Hopelessness In Me"	2024	The Serpent's Tears
"Breaking Down My Will"	2024	The Serpent's Tears
"Can't Keep On Running Away"	2026	Drag Me Out
"Halo Of Smoke"	2026	Drag Me Out
"BLOOD GODS"	2026	Drag Me Out

=== Collaborations ===
Song	Year	Album	Artist
"Limitless"	2011	Limitless	Crown the Empire
"#OIMATEWTF"	2012	'Til Death	Capture the Crown
"Once Upon a Life"	2012	Fear Is What You Call I	Hide & Dream
"10,000 Miles"	2012	Non-album singles	At the Ruins
"Just Another Night[mare]"	2012	Non-album singles	Skarlett
"Valde Tribuo"	2013	Non-album singles	Of Sun & Seed
"C.O.D.Y."	2013	Ocean Inside Me	A Reason to Breathe
"Sink Your Teeth Into This"	2015	Conquer Divide	Conquer Divide
"Lucid Dreams"	2015	Divide to Unite	Forever in Combat
"Hale's Own"	2015	Non-album singles	Polarity
"Isn't Pretend"	2022	Non-album singles	Luurk
"1M Followers"	2022	Imago	Space of Variations
"Carnivore"	2023	Non-album singles	Militant Me
"Ease the Pain"	2026	Non-album singles	Fake Majesty
