= Asking Alexandria (album) =

Studio album by Asking Alexandria
- Released: 15 December 2017
- Recorded: 2017
- Studio: Good Sounds Studio, Tempe, Arizona, U.S.
- Genre: Hard rock; metalcore; post-hardcore
- Length: 44:07
- Label: Sumerian
- Producer: Matt Good; Jonathan Davis

Asking Alexandria chronology
The Black (2016)	Asking Alexandria (2017)	Like a House on Fire (2020)

Singles from Asking Alexandria
- 1. "Into the Fire" Released: 21 September 2017; 2. "Where Did It Go?" Released: 25 October 2017; 3. "Alone in a Room" Released: 25 May 2018; 4. "Vultures" Released: 15 December 2018

Asking Alexandria is the fifth studio album by English rock band Asking Alexandria. It was released on 15 December 2017 through Sumerian Records. This is their first album since the return of original lead vocalist Danny Worsnop, as well as their first album working with producers Matt Good and Jonathan Davis instead of longtime producer Joey Sturgis. It also marks the group's slight departure from their heavier metalcore roots and towards a more straight forward and melodic hard rock sound. On 27 December 2019, the deluxe version of the album titled LP5 DLX was released.

== Composition ==
=== Style ===
This album has been described as hard rock, metalcore, and post-hardcore, with elements of pop.

== Release and promotion ==
On 21 September 2017, the band released the lead single "Into the Fire" from the album. The band released a second single from the album, entitled "Where Did It Go?", on 25 October 2017. On 25 May 2018, the band released the third single "Alone in a Room" alongside an accompanying lyric video. On 15 December, the band released their fourth single "Vultures" and its corresponding animated music video.

== Critical reception ==
Professional ratings
Aggregate scores
Source	Rating
Metacritic	73/100
Review scores
Source	Rating
AllMusic	4/5 stars
The Guardian	3/5 stars
Louder Sound	3.5/5 stars

Asking Alexandria received generally positive reviews from critics. At Metacritic, which assigns a normalised rating out of 100 to reviews from mainstream critics, the album has an average score of 73 out of 100 based on 4 reviews, indicating "generally favorable reviews". AllMusic gave the album a positive review saying, "Overall, Asking Alexandria is a worthy return from the classic lineup, retaining the best aspects of its past and taking steps into its future. Regardless of a stumble or two, Asking Alexandria is well worth a listen. While The Black was a passable offering at a time when it seemed like it would be a permanent arrangement, this reunion simply feels right."

Michacel Hann at The Guardian stating, "The York quintet are the model of an If-You-Like-This-Sort-of-Thing band – huge, monolithic sheets of sound, precision-tooled to get large crowds putting their hands in the air. The formula is shaken up – a furious Slipknot-esque break is put in the middle of Into the Air; 'Hopelessly Hopeful' and 'When the Lights Come On' dial down the metal and ramp up the pop – but you're never more than a couple of minutes away from some preposterous chorus. It doesn't sound like Def Leppard, but it is reminiscent of that band's willingness to smooth off metal's rough edges and boost the melodies." Louder Sound gave the album a positive review and stated: "Ultimately, then, Asking Alexandria isn't a throwback or a sidestep – it's a whole new animal, and it's gonna need a bigger zoo."

== Track listing ==
No.	Title	Writer(s)	Length
1.	"Alone in a Room"	Danny Worsnop, Ben Bruce, Matt Good	4:05
2.	"Into the Fire"	Worsnop, Bruce, Good, James Cassells	3:57
3.	"Hopelessly Hopeful"	Worsnop, Bruce, Good, Cassells	3:13
4.	"Where Did It Go?"	Worsnop, Bruce, Good	3:13
5.	"Rise Up"	Worsnop, Bruce, Good	3:07
6.	"When the Lights Come On"	Worsnop, Bruce, Good, Cassells	3:23
7.	"Under Denver"	Worsnop, Bruce, Good	4:05
8.	"Vultures"	Worsnop, Bruce, Good	3:28
9.	"Eve"	Worsnop, Bruce, Good, Cassells	3:58
10.	"I Am One"	Worsnop, Bruce, Good	3:32
11.	"Empire" (featuring Bingx)	Worsnop, Bruce, Good, Cassells, Chanler Hendrickson	4:16
12.	"Room 138"	Worsnop, Bruce, Good, Cassells	3:44
Total length:			44:07

Hidden track
No.	Title	Writer(s)	Length
13.	"Into the Fire" (radio edit) / "Xplicit" (latter starts at 3:30 into the track)	Worsnop, Bruce, Good, Cassells	5:40
Total length:			49:47

LP5 DLX
No.	Title	Writer(s)	Length
13.	"Into the Fire" (radio edit)	Worsnop, Bruce, Good, Cassells	3:30
14.	"Vultures" (rock version)	Worsnop, Bruce, Good	3:26
15.	"Where Did It Go?" (Hyro the Hero mash-up)	Worsnop, Bruce, Hyron Fenton	2:17
16.	"Perfect" (Ed Sheeran cover; live from Sirius XM)	Ed Sheeran	4:31
17.	"Rise Up" (original demo)	Worsnop, Bruce, Good	3:19
18.	"Alone in a Room" (acoustic)	Worsnop, Bruce, Good	4:25
19.	"Alone in a Room" (Dex Luthor remix)	Worsnop, Bruce, Good	3:17
Total length:			68:00

== Personnel ==
Credits adapted from AllMusic.

Asking Alexandria

- Danny Worsnop – lead vocals, additional guitar
- Ben Bruce – lead guitar, backing vocals, vocals on track 11
- Cameron Liddell – rhythm guitar
- Sam Bettley – bass
- James Cassells – drums

Additional musicians

- Bingx – guest vocals on track 11
- Hyro the Hero – guest vocals on track 15

Additional personnel

- Matt Good – production, engineering, keyboards, programming
- Jonathan Davis – production
- Will Beasley and Ryan Daminson – engineering
- Taylor Larson – mixing
- Ted Jensen – mastering
- Don Sepulveda – management
- Ash Avildsen and Nick Walters – A&R
- Daniel McBride – artwork, layout
- Sanjay Parikh – band photo
- Steven Contreras – photography

== Charts ==
Chart (2017)	Peak position
Australian Albums (ARIA)	53
Canadian Albums (Billboard)	53
German Albums (Offizielle Top 100)	71
Latvian Albums (LaIPA)	93
New Zealand Heatseeker Albums (RMNZ)	5
Dutch Albums (Album Top 100)	200
Swiss Albums (Schweizer Hitparade)	63
UK Albums (OCC)	86
US Billboard 200	27
