= Asking Alexandria =

English rock band

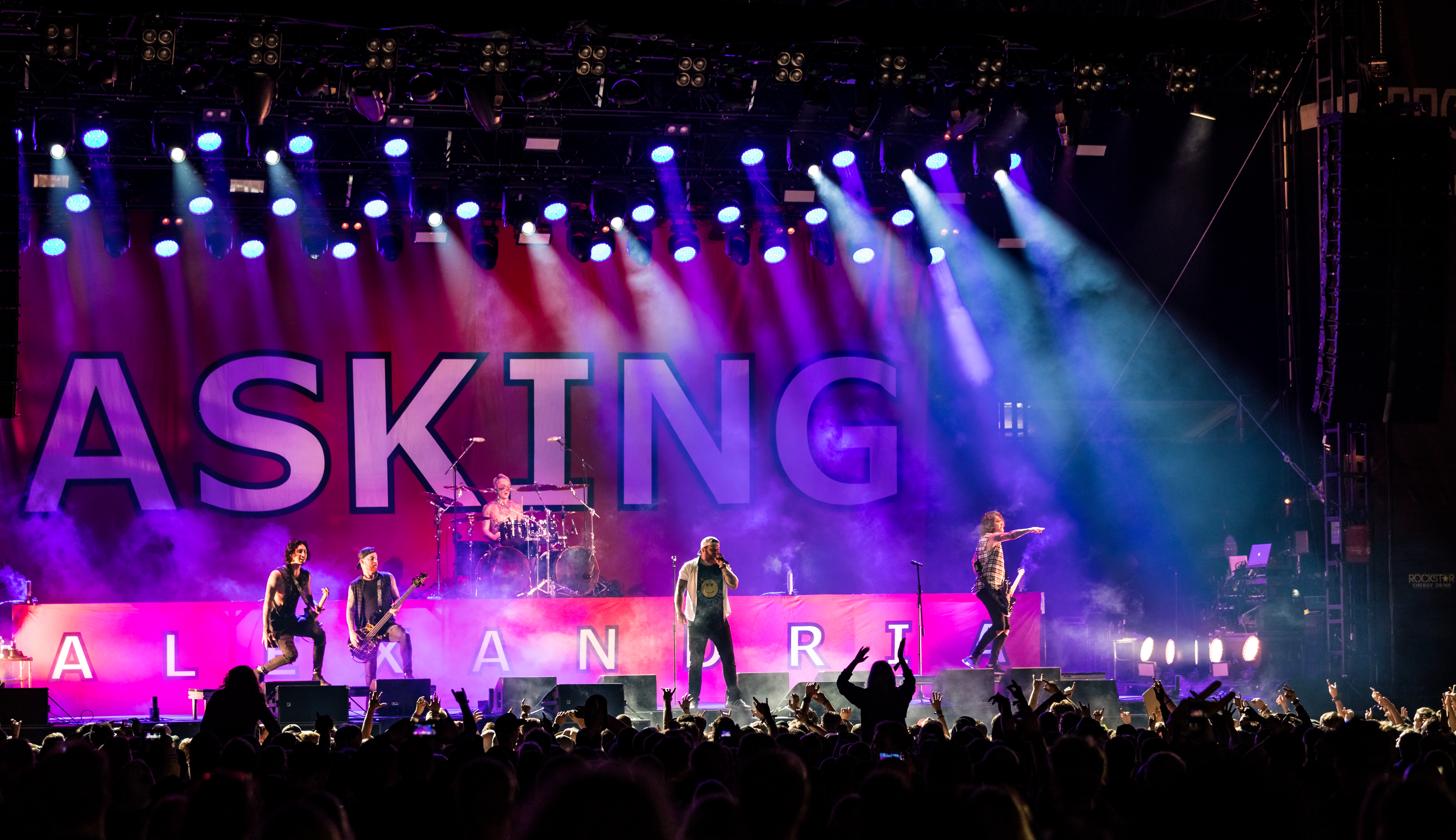
- Asking Alexandria performing at Rock am Ring in 2018

Background information
- Origin: York, North Yorkshire, England
- Genres: Metalcore; heavy metal; post-hardcore; hard rock; electronicore (early)
- Years active: 2008–present
- Labels: Better Noise; Sumerian; Monstercat
- Members: James Cassells; Cameron Liddell; Sam Bettley; Danny Worsnop
- Past members: Ryan Binns; Joe Lancaster; Denis Stoff; Ben Bruce
- Website: askingalexandria.com

Asking Alexandria are an English rock band formed in York, North Yorkshire, consisting of guitarist Cameron Liddell, drummer James Cassells, vocalist Danny Worsnop, and bassist Sam Bettley.

Initially formed in 2006 by Ben Bruce, the band officially established as a six-piece in 2008 with the founding line-up consisting of Bruce, Worsnop, Cassells, Liddell, Joe Lancaster and Ryan Binns. After the departure of Lancaster and Binns, as well as the recruitment of bassist Sam Bettley in 2009, the band released their debut album Stand Up and Scream (2009). The band released two studio albums Reckless & Relentless (2011) and From Death to Destiny (2013), before the departure of Worsnop in January 2015. He was replaced by Denis Stoff and the band released The Black (2016). Stoff departed from the band in October that year, and Worsnop subsequently returned to the band. The band released their self-titled fifth album in late 2017, which was a marked stylistic departure from their previous works. Their sixth studio album, Like a House on Fire, which was released in 2020, showed the group's continuity of a more straightforward and melodic hard rock sound, while also shifting into different genres. Its follow-up and their seventh studio album, See What's on the Inside, was released in 2021. Their eighth studio album, Where Do We Go from Here?, was released in 2023.

== History ==
=== Background and early iterations (2003–2008) ===
In 2003, guitarist Ben Bruce originally founded a group while living in Dubai, United Arab Emirates, initially named Amongst Us. The band was later renamed End of Reason before settling on the name Asking Alexandria in 2006. This early iteration of Asking Alexandria had multiple releases, including the debut EP Tomorrow. Hope. Goodbye (2006), followed by the self-released debut album The Irony of Your Perfection (2007). At age 17, Bruce returned to Nottingham, England due to homesickness. Although the Emirati musicians initially accompanied him, he ultimately formed an entirely new lineup under the same name with local members. Among them was lead vocalist Danny Worsnop, whom the two became close friends, Bruce had even invited Worsnop to move into his flat in York.

=== Formation, early releases and Stand Up and Scream (2008–2009) ===
The newly founded Asking Alexandria started in 2008, and was a six-piece after recruiting Ryan Binns on synthesizers, James Cassells on drums, Joe Lancaster on bass and Cameron Liddell on rhythm guitar. Later that year, Binns decided to leave the band. In January 2009, Lancaster also decided to leave and was replaced with Sam Bettley. Lancaster later joined the metalcore band With One Last Breath.

Bruce carried the name of his previous Dubai-based band over to his new one, due to not wanting the bother of coming up with a new one. However, he insists that despite having the same name, it is not the same band. When asked why he chose that particular name, he explained that "Most bands have a pretty shit band name, so I just came up with something. I came up with Alexandria as a human name, because people relate to humans."

The English Asking Alexandria's debut album Stand Up and Scream was recorded during Spring 2009 and was produced by Joey Sturgis. The band signed to Sumerian Records and released their debut album on the label on 15 September. The album charted only in the US peaking at 4 in the Top Heatseekers, 24 in the Top Hard Rock Albums and 29 in the Top Independent Albums. Four singles were released from Stand Up and Scream: "Final Episode (Let's Change the Channel)", "A Prophecy", "If You Can't Ride Two Horses at Once... You Should Get Out of the Circus", and "Not the American Average". On 3 December 2014, the single "Final Episode (Let's Change the Channel)" was certified gold by the RIAA after 500,000 copies were sold in the US. On 30 March 2017, the band's fourth single "Not the American Average" was also certified gold by the RIAA after 500,000 copies were sold in the US. The band toured across America as a support act for the remainder of the year, supporting Evergreen Terrace along with For the Fallen Dreams and Unholy in October, and Alesana along with From First to Last, The Word Alive and Memphis May Fire in November and December.

=== Reckless & Relentless (2010–2012) ===
They toured across the US as a headlining act in March with bands We Came as Romans, From First to Last, Our Last Night, and A Bullet For Pretty Boy. The band supported metalcore outfit Attack Attack! throughout March and April along with Breathe Carolina, I See Stars and Bury Tomorrow in the US. They later supported Dance Gavin Dance during their European tour in April to early May along with In Fear and Faith, during which they performed at The Bamboozle festival on 1 May. The band performed at the "Thrash & Burn" tour as a headline act along with Born of Osiris, Kittie and Stick to Your Guns from 16 July to 14 August in America.

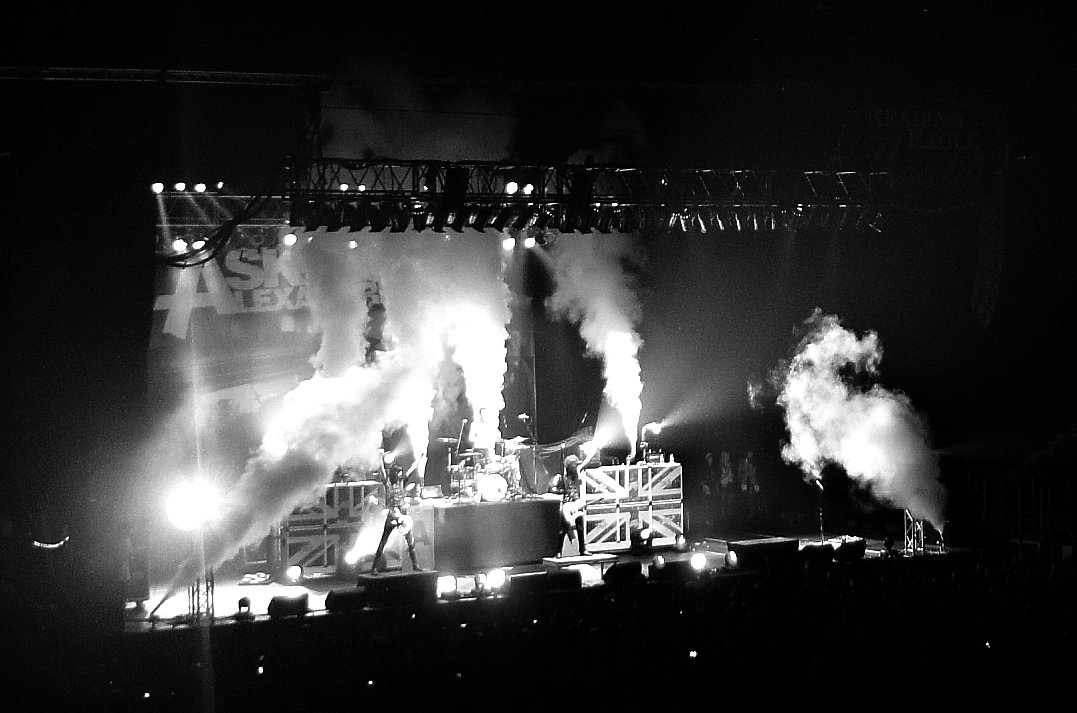
Asking Alexandria performing at Reading in November 2011

After touring the band announced that they would release a limited edition EP and DVD titled Life Gone Wild both digitally and excursively at Hot Topic on 21 December 2010 and would feature a new song titled "Breathless" which was initially a demo for their second album Stand Up and Scream and multiple covers while the DVD provides video footage of the band themselves. The band also announced that they would release a remix album titled Stepped Up and Scratched and was initially announced as the remix version of their debut and would be released in January 2011, however was later announced to be released in November instead and would contain remixes of songs from their to be released second album. Their third album, titled Reckless & Relentless was released 4 April 2011. This time, the album did chart in the UK, peaking at 7 on the UK Rock Chart, and also charted in Australia at 30 on the Australian Albums Chart. The band also released a cover of Akon's song "Right Now (Na Na Na)" for the Punk Goes... compilation series, specifically for the album Punk Goes Pop 3.

Asking Alexandria later performed at the "Soundwave 2011 Festival" in Australia during late February and early March. In April and May, the band headlined in the UK with support acts Of Mice & Men and Chelsea Grin. Also in April comedian Charlie Sheen had offered the band a spot on his 'My Violent Torpedo of Truth' tour across the US however the band had to turn it down due to their touring schedule at the time, but expressed their flattery and admitted to being fans of Sheen. The group was also the headliner for the Vans Warped Tour 2011 in July. The band co-headlined a toured with rap rock band Hollywood Undead throughout November across America, dubbed the World War III tour. After their tour both bands supported Avenged Sevenfold during their headline arena tour throughout the remainder of November to mid December.

In 2012, the band was listed by Revolver under the most anticipated albums of 2012, with Danny Worsnop giving the statement that the general sound of the album will be a "...musical baby of Mötley Crüe and Slipknot." In March the band participated in Dallas' 'South By So What?!' festival and later toured with support acts Trivium, Dir En Grey, I See Stars, Motionless in White and the Amity Affliction throughout North America from early March to early April, naming the tour 'Still Reckless'.

In early May, the band debuted a trailer for their short film titled Through Sin and Self-Destruction featuring the band members, said to contain a "controversial, uncensored look into the real lives of a new era of rock stars for today's generation" and was officially released on iTunes on 15 May. The film itself consists of the three music videos from their second album: "Reckless & Relentless", "To the Stage" and "Dear Insanity".

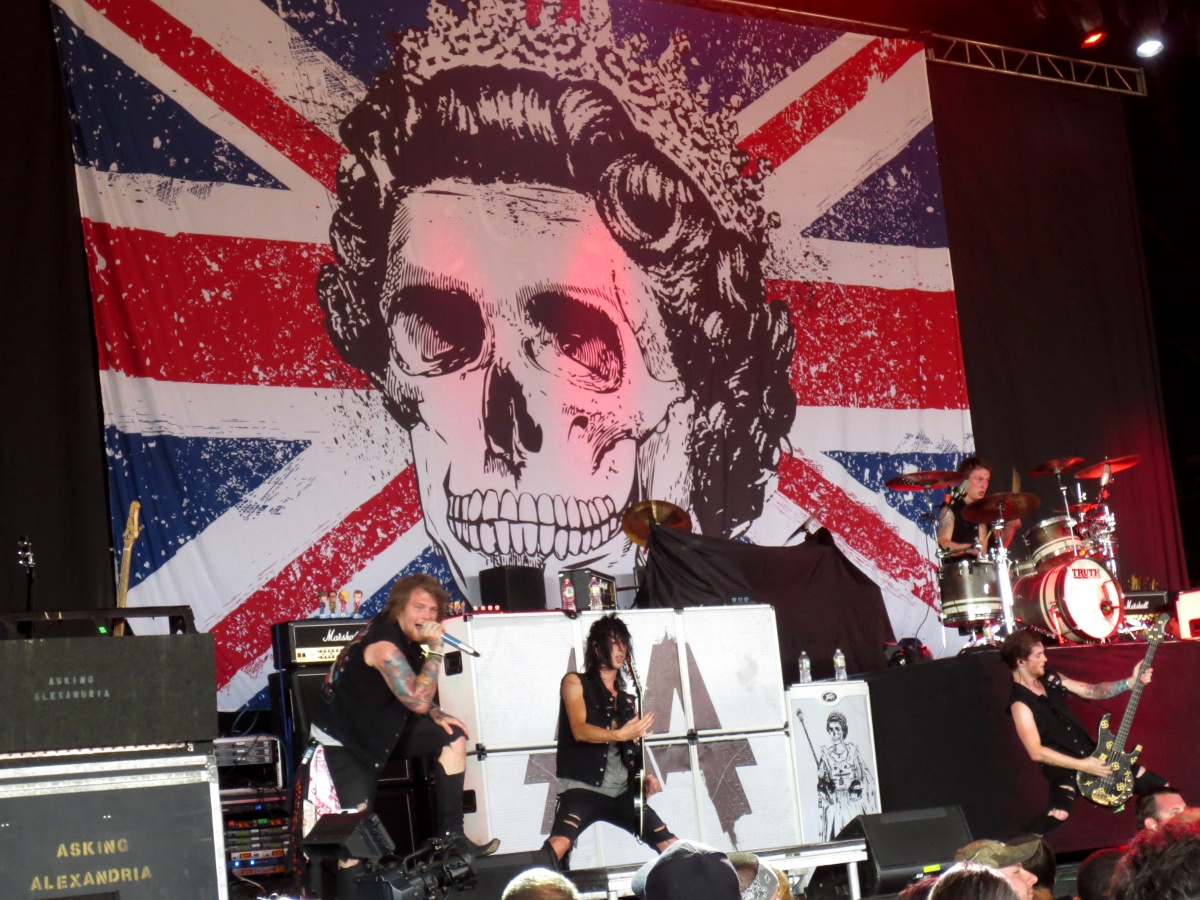
Asking Alexandria performing at Mayhem Festival 2012

On 5 August, the band performed at the 2012 Mayhem Festival tour along with other bands such as Motörhead, Slayer and Slipknot. Later the same month, the band offered a free download for their new song titled "Run Free" and was said to be from their third album that had yet to be announced. A month later, when asked about the sound of the third album, Ben Bruce explained that the band had matured and in order to excel in their career they will be recording and releasing radio friendly singles, however this will not result in the sound of the overall album as he describes the rest of the album to be "balls-to-the-wall kind of stuff", adding that it would be released in 2013.

In November, the band headlined in Monster Energy's 'Outbreak Tour' throughout November and December across North America with support acts As I Lay Dying, Memphis May Fire, Attila and I See Stars who replaced Suicide Silence who had issues regarding the death of their singer, Mitch Lucker. Also in November, the band performed at Metalfest California along the likes of Killswitch Engage, As I Lay Dying and Black Veil Brides. On 30 November, the band released an EP exclusively through Revolver Magazine for free via subscription, containing covers of 80's rock bands including; Whitesnake, Journey, Def Leppard and Mötley Crüe, along with their song Run Free released earlier that year.

Towards the end of their Outbreak tour, Danny Worsnop sustained a torn vocal cord, causing him to sit out the New York performance and allow the singers of Atilla and I See Stars, along with a multi-talented roadie to perform vocal duties. Despite the injury the singer later performed at the memorial concert for Suicide Silence's Mitch Lucker in order to raise money for his now fatherless daughter.

=== From Death to Destiny (2013–2014) ===
After Worsnop tore his vocal cord in December 2012, he visited a doctor weeks prior to the events of January 2013, giving an update that he will need to rest his vocals until he has recovered fully but also reassured fans that this will not hinder the release of their third album as the majority of the recording had been complete before his injury. In January, they performed a short headline tour across the UK with support acts Motionless in White and Betraying the Martyrs. In late March, the band released the first song of their third album titled "The Death of Me", and announced that the album will be released later that year in Summer. The official release date was later revealed to be 6 August with the album title, From Death to Destiny.

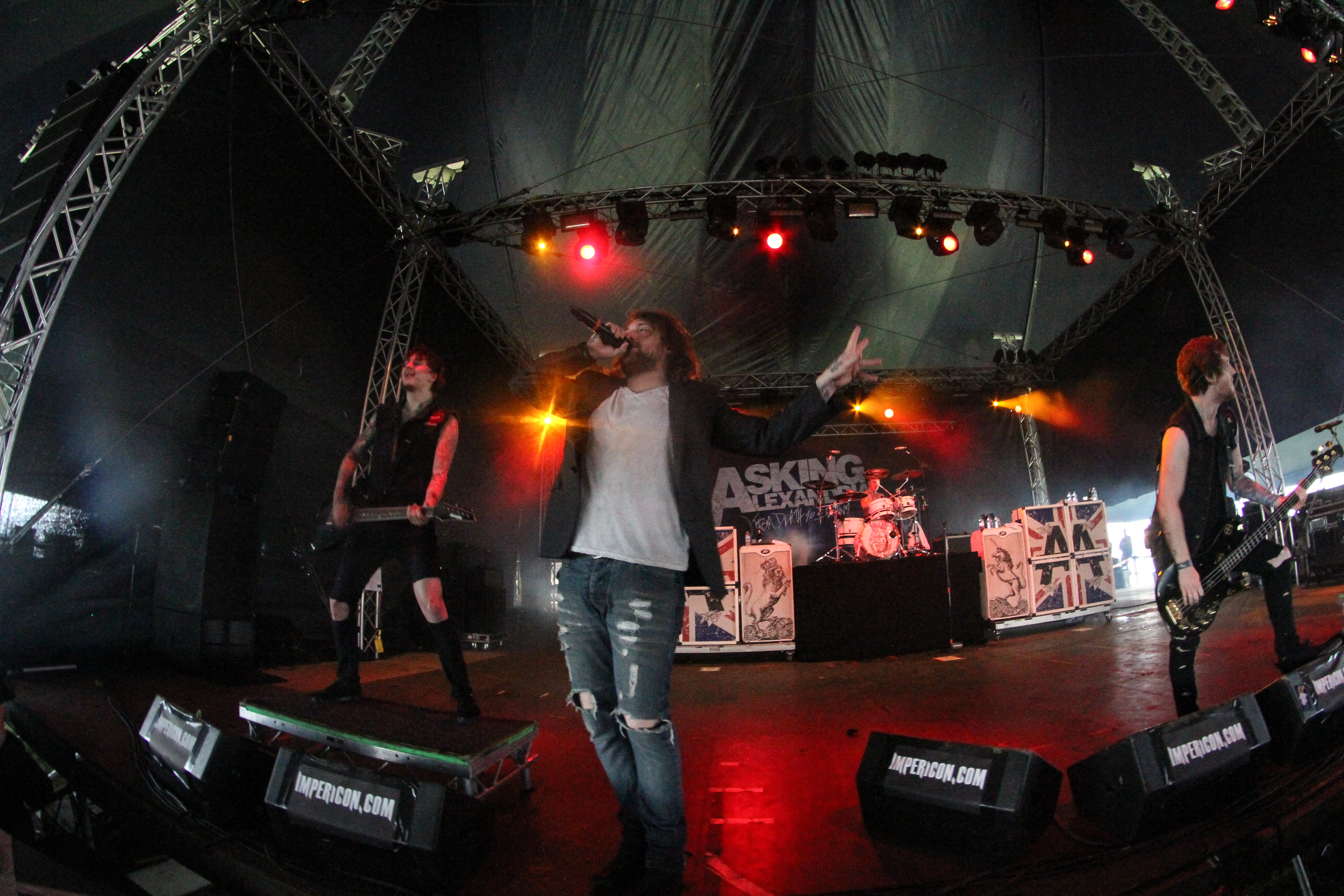
Asking Alexandria at With Full Force 2013

The band toured across America in April and June with Whitechapel, Motionless in White, Chimaira and I Killed the Prom Queen, dubbing the tour 'Don't Pray for Us'. Also in April the band partook in the Rocklahoma festival. The band also performed at Rock on the Range festival in mid May. The band later performed at Rock AM Ring in Germany, Download in England, Graspop in Belgium and also With Full Force in Australia in June.

From Death to Destiny was successfully released on 6 August, and became the band's highest-charting album to date and their label's highest first-week selling album, debuting at 5 on the Billboard 200 and selling over 41,000 units. In September the band participated in the annual Aftershock Festival and later toured with nu metal band Korn in America in September and October as a support act, along with Love and Death. The band embarked on their own 'From Death to Destiny' tour in October after touring with Korn, featuring support acts All That Remains, Sevendust and Emmure, across America.

In 2014 the band performed at Soundwave in Australia in February and later released a cover of Nine Inch Nails song "Closer" for the compilation Punk Goes 90s Vol. 2 issued by Fearless Records in April, making it their second time they have recorded for the series. In March 2014, the lead single from their debut album, "Final Episode (Let's Change the Channel)" was certified gold by the RIAA. Asking Alexandria was one of the main headlining bands in the annual Never Say Never Festival on 12 March, along with Bring Me the Horizon also headlining the festival. They later embarked on another headlining tour in North America, dubbed as the 'Break Down The Walls' tour, starting in March and ending in April, with support acts August Burns Red, We Came as Romans, Crown the Empire and Born of Osiris. The band also performed in South Africa in May.

In July, the band was announced as the nominees for Alternative Press' first Music Awards, nominated for Best Live Band and Best International Band and also performed at the ceremony itself, covering Duran Duran's "Hungry Like the Wolf" featuring guest vocals from Jonathan Davis. On 15 December 2014, the band released their first official live DVD titled Live from Brixton and Beyond which features the bands sold-out London show at the O2 Academy Brixton, as well as behind-the-scenes and backstage footage from the performance, it also includes the unseen Reckless Halloween performance at The Wiltern in Los Angeles, all of the band's music videos and the 'Through Sin and Self-Destruction' short film.

=== Departure of Worsnop and The Black (2015–2016) ===
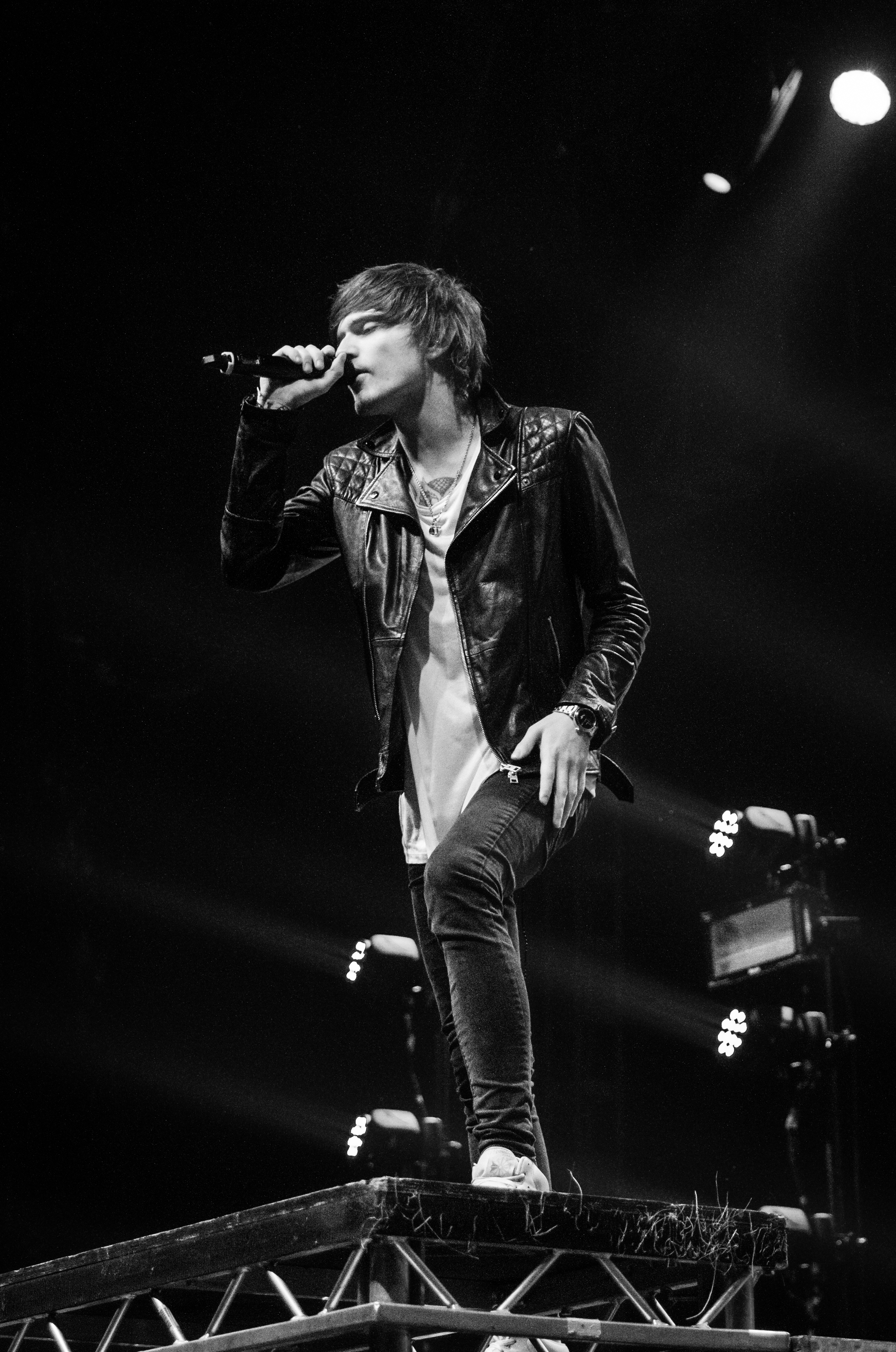
Denis Stoff was a part of Asking Alexandria from early 2015 until his departure in late 2016.

On 22 January 2015, lead singer Danny Worsnop announced his departure from the band to focus on rock music with his new band We Are Harlot. He also stated that despite his departure, the band would continue touring. Lead guitarist Ben Bruce announced that there would be a new lead singer. Fans reacted to news in distress as they believe he was essential to the band's sound, while others were not surprised by his career move, some going as far to say he performs better with his new band We Are Harlot than he does with Asking Alexandria. When Bruce was queried regarding his status with Worsnop he stated that he felt abandoned long before his departure since Worsnop's lost the care for screaming and heavier music since their release of their second album, and continued to say that he would not know if he could call him and Worsnop friends.

When Bruce was asked regarding the sound of the fourth album, he stated that while it will feature influences of Guns N' Roses and Van Halen it will also feature influences from modern bands such as Avenged Sevenfold and Slipknot, stating that since the third album was such an unexpected change in musical style he believes that fans will expect further experimentation on the next, therefore having less backlash from their fan base. He has also stated that they started writing material for the album while on tour in summer of 2014 and had written around 18 tracks, and estimates that it will be released between July and August 2015.

On 26 May 2015, Denis Stoff, formerly the guitarist and vocalist of Ukrainian metalcore bands Make Me Famous and Down & Dirty, was revealed as the new lead vocalist when the band released "I Won't Give In", their first single with him, on 27 May. Speculation regarding Stoff's involvement started shortly after Worsnop's departure due to similarities between Asking Alexandria and Make Me Famous (who were said to have been ripping off the band's sound); the fact that they were label mates would have made the transition easy for Stoff to make, and on his personal YouTube account he had covered multiple Asking Alexandria songs. Bruce was asked if he considered anyone else for the role and he stated that "It has to be Denis" going on to praise his much greater vocal range and since he was inspired by Worsnop in the earlier stages of Asking Alexandria he can perform their songs live much better than Worsnop could, however when Stoff himself was asked how he would distinguish himself from him, he stated he would not make any comparison since he is a completely different person.

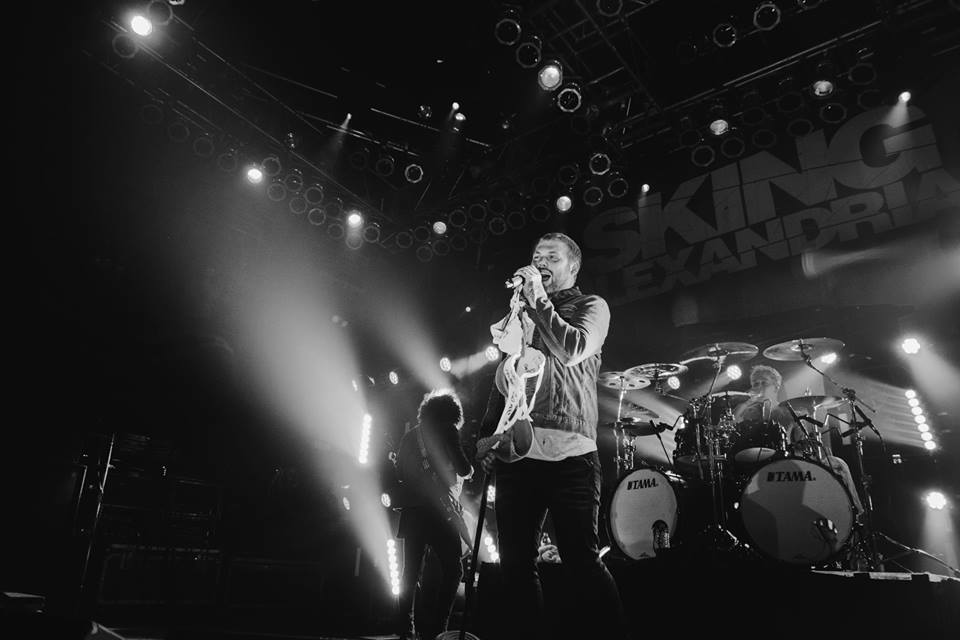
Asking Alexandria live in 2016

The band initially planned to perform for the first time with Stoff on 31 May at Manchester Academy 3 and at London Underworld a day after, however due to Stoff being unable to secure a visa in time for the shows, they had to cancel. They have also been announced as one of the acts for the 2015 Rock Am Ring and Rock Im Park Festivals in Germany in early June. The band also announced that they will be performing at the 2015 Vans Warped Tour.

In October, on their headlining tour through Europe, the band announced that the original plan to release the album in October/November has changed and that the fans can expect the album in early 2016 with a new single and music video in November. In late December it was revealed that the album's title was going to be The Black and is expected to be released in March 2016, and will be supporting British metal band Bullet for My Valentine in North America from 2 February to 7 March, dubbed the British Invasion tour.

=== Worsnop's return and self-titled fifth album (2016–2018) ===
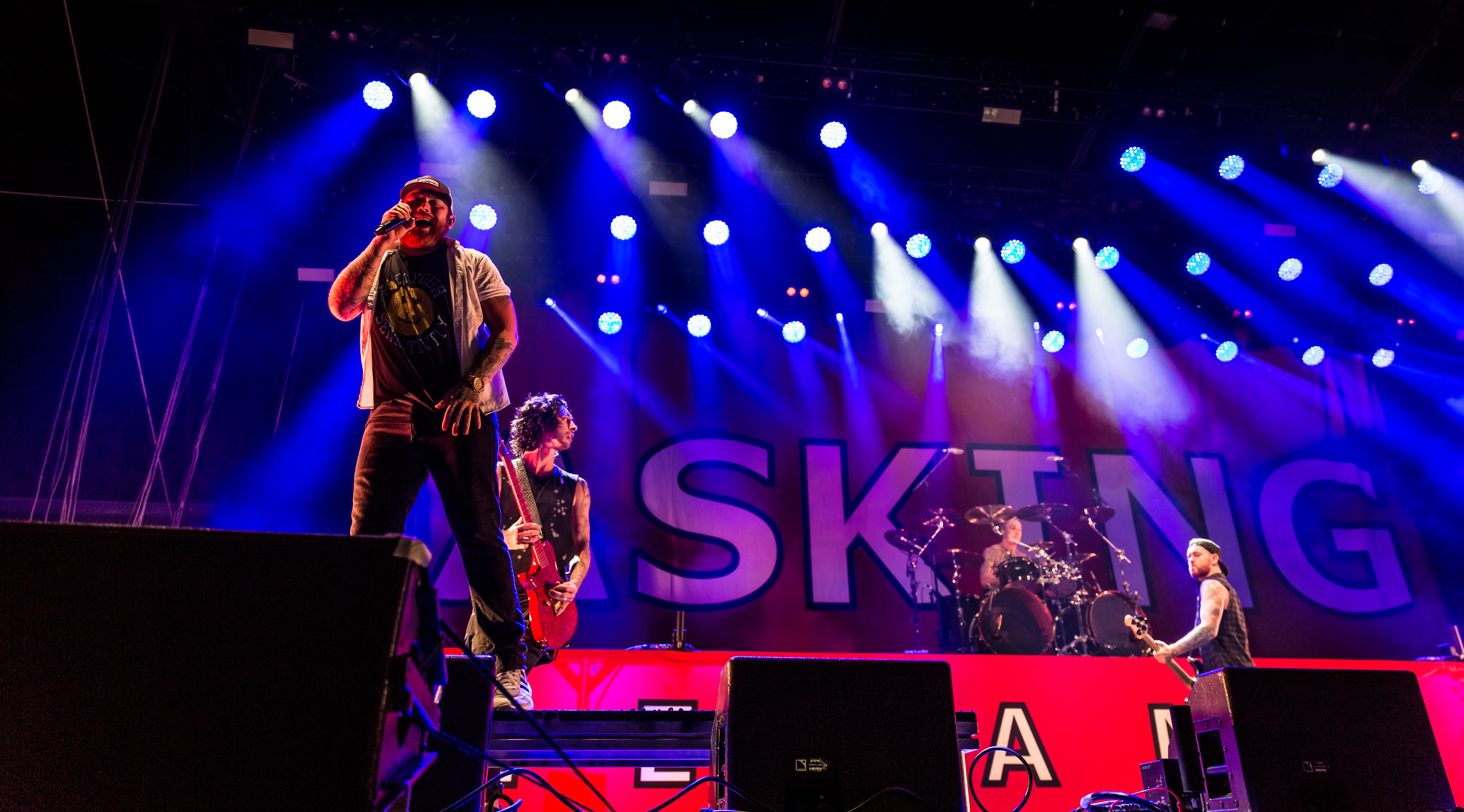
Asking Alexandria live at Rock am Ring in 2018

In mid-October 2016, it was speculated that the band had settled their differences with original lead vocalist Danny Worsnop and that some sort of collaborative effort would be made after several pictures were posted of Worsnop and Bruce in the studio together. However, it was revealed two days later that Worsnop had actually returned to the band as an official member after the departure of Denis Stoff. Ben Bruce explained that after a long period of time of not communicating with the band, Stoff stated, "Asking Alexandria does not exist unless I get what's owed to me". Worsnop also opened up about his return to the band, stating that "this is something that [he] can embrace again". When the band performed again for the first time with Worsnop since Stoff's departure, their set list excluded all songs from their most recent album The Black and instead consisted of songs that they had not performed in years. This occurred just as the band headlined Sumerian's "Ten Years in the Black Tour" supported by Veil of Maya, Born of Osiris, I See Stars, Upon a Burning Body, After the Burial, and Bad Omens. As time went on more information regarding Stoff had been released, such as that Stoff had lip-synced the band's older songs during live performances, an accusation made by Worsnop's lawyers who notified him after sending Stoff a cease and desist. When asked about Stoff's time as his replacement, Worsnop replied stating that "Replace is a strong word. He was just keeping my seat warm. Honestly, I don't know the kid so I have no opinion of him as a person…" Stoff stated that his departure was due to personal stress caused by the unrest in his home country of Ukraine.

The band released their first studio material with Worsnop back in the band on 21 September 2017, the single "Into the Fire" which would be the lead single from their upcoming album. The band released a second single from the album, entitled "Where Did It Go?", on 25 October 2017. On 15 December 2017, the band released their self-titled fifth studio album. The album marked a significant stylistic shift from the band's earlier metalcore work, incorporating influences from a wide pool of genres including stadium rock.

=== Like a House on Fire (2019–2020) ===
On 11 July 2019, the band released their new song called "The Violence". On 6 December, the band unveiled the dubstep remix of their song, "The Violence" by the electronic artist "Sikdope". The band would go on to finish the year off by re-releasing their fifth album as a belated Christmas present to fans and as an anniversary to their much acclaimed album. The re-release features six bonus tracks including a rock rendition of a previous track, a demo, an acoustic track, a cover and a mash-up.

The band announced their headline tour after two years along with Falling in Reverse, Wage War and Hyro the Hero, the tour is called 'Like A House On Fire World Tour'. It is intended to be a world tour. On 11 February 2020, the band announced that a new single named "They Don't Want What We Want (And They Don't Care)" would premiere on Octane on 12 February.

On 4 March, the band announced their upcoming sixth studio album titled Like a House on Fire set for release on 15 May 2020. At the same day, the band released the third single of the album titled "Antisocialist" and its corresponding music video. On 15 April, the band released the fourth single "Down to Hell" alongside an accompanying lyric video. On 11 May, four days before the album release, the band released their fifth single "House on Fire".

=== See What's on the Inside (2021–2023) ===
On 7 June 2021, the band announced that they signed to Better Noise Music. On 20 August, the band surprise released a brand new single "Alone Again" from their seventh studio album, See What's on the Inside, which was released on 1 October 2021. At the same time, the band revealed the album cover and the track list. Guitarist Ben Bruce commented about the track: "'Alone Again' and the rest of this album is the result of us reconnecting and falling back in love with why we started this band in the first place. No frills or cheap tricks, just the five of us playing our instruments as hard and as loud as we can!"

On 31 August, the band unveiled the official music video for "Alone Again". On 23 September, one week before the album release, the band teased on their social media the song "Faded Out" which would be available on 1 October. To promote the album, the band also announced that they will support A Day to Remember's rescheduled "The Re-Entry Tour" along with Point North in September 2021. On 27 September, the group announced their headlining European/UK Tour 2022 to support the album. On 1 October, in celebration of the album release, the band debuted the music video for the song "Never Gonna Learn". An EP for that single, Never Gonna Learn, was released on 21 January 2022, containing two songs from See What's on the Inside and two new songs, including "New Devil" which features Maria Brink of In This Moment. On 20 May 2022, the band released a new version of another song from See What's on the Inside, "Faded Out", featuring Sharon den Adel of Within Temptation (credited as the band's name). This new version is scheduled to be on the soundtrack of the upcoming movie The Retaliators.

=== Where Do We Go from Here? and Bruce's departure (2023–present) ===
On 29 April 2023, Asking Alexandria released a video teaser for their new song "Dark Void", available on 12 May. On that day, the band officially unveiled the single and its corresponding music video. On 12 June, they revealed the title for their upcoming eighth studio album would be Where Do We Go from Here?.

On 16 June, the band premiered two singles "Psycho" and "Bad Blood" along with an accompanying music video for "Psycho". On 7 July, they officially announced the album would be released on 25 August 2023 while also publishing the album cover and the track list. The music video for "Let Go" was released 25 August 2023, coinciding with the album release.

On 19 January 2024, Ben Bruce announced on Instagram that he was stepping away from Asking Alexandria to spend more time with his family.

On 16 August, it was announced the band would be supporting Falling in Reverse on select UK dates of their European tour. However, those shows were cancelled as UK immigration laws regarding prior criminal convictions have prevented Falling in Reverse vocalist Ronnie Radke from setting foot in the country.

The band performed at the Sonic Temple music festival in Columbus, Ohio in May 2025. On 28 August 2025, drummer James Cassells began playing with the American rock band, Breaking Benjamin.

== Musical style ==
The band's music has mostly been described as metalcore, hard rock, heavy metal, post-hardcore, and screamo. Their early work has been described as electronicore. Additionally, Invisible Oranges referred to them as "scene music" in a 2018 article. Loudwire said the band were "forerunners of the late-2000s scenecore movement." Writing for Red Bull, music journalist Eli Enis stated that during this point in the band's career, the band was known for "brazenly stuffing their hulking metalcore songs with gooey pop hooks, neon synths, and ravey effects" in a way similar to Attack Attack!, I See Stars and Enter Shikari. Additionally, they were considered to be a "crabcore" band early in their career due to their posturing on stage and in music videos. Revolver said the band were "students of the Attack Attack! playbook."

Their first two Sumerian albums, 2009's Stand Up and Scream and 2011's Reckless & Relentless, are both generally considered to be metalcore albums, while their fourth album, 2013's From Death to Destiny, is influenced by heavy metal and rock bands while maintaining Asking Alexandria's signature metalcore sound on certain tracks. Guitarist Ben Bruce has stated that they do not like writing music that sounds the same from album to album, which is why their musical style has changed over time. Loudwire described their style during this time as "dad rock".

=== Lyrical themes ===
Ben Bruce has expressed his view that the band's lyrical style prior to Reckless & Relentless was juvenile. According to him, the band eventually strove to rely less on profanity in its lyrics on later releases in favour of lyrics that the band considered to be more meaningful. He stated that From Death to Destiny abandoned the focus on subjects such as recreational drug use and casual sex that were present on previous releases to achieve this. Danny Worsnop has claimed that the band's lyrics are never written before entering the studio and are always improvised during the recording of an album.

=== Influences ===
Their early influences were August Burns Red, Protest the Hero, Underoath and Funeral For A Friend.

Lead guitarist Ben Bruce also cited Gary Moore, Michael Jackson, Slipknot, Iron Maiden, Metallica, Bullet for My Valentine, Avenged Sevenfold, the Offspring, Blink-182 and British rock such as Oasis or Coldplay as influences.

All of the band's members have expressed their passion for 1980s rock music, and demonstrated it with releases such as the Life Gone Wild EP featuring covers of two Skid Row songs or the Under the Influence: A Tribute to the Legends of Hard Rock EP featuring covers of songs by bands such as Journey, Mötley Crüe, Whitesnake and Def Leppard.

Vocalist Danny Worsnop said that Aerosmith are his "all time biggest inspiration"

Their third studio album From Death to Destiny is heavily influenced by such bands. Some of their main infleunces include Guns N' Roses, Metallica, Mötley Crüe, Sebastian Bach, Skid Row and Van Halen, but they also take influence from modern bands such as Slipknot and Avenged Sevenfold.

== Band members ==
Asking Alexandria live at Rock am Ring 2018

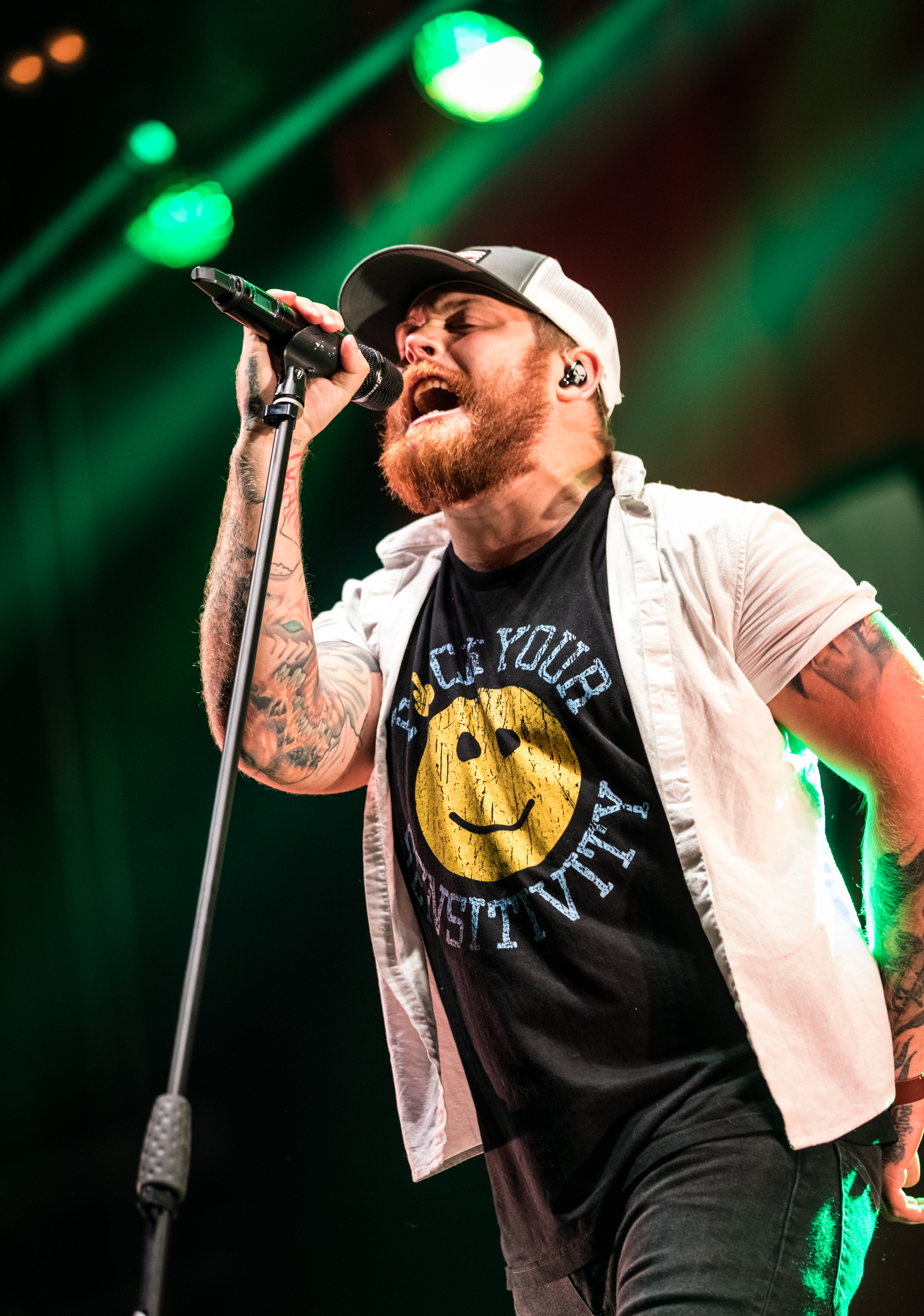
Singer Danny Worsnop

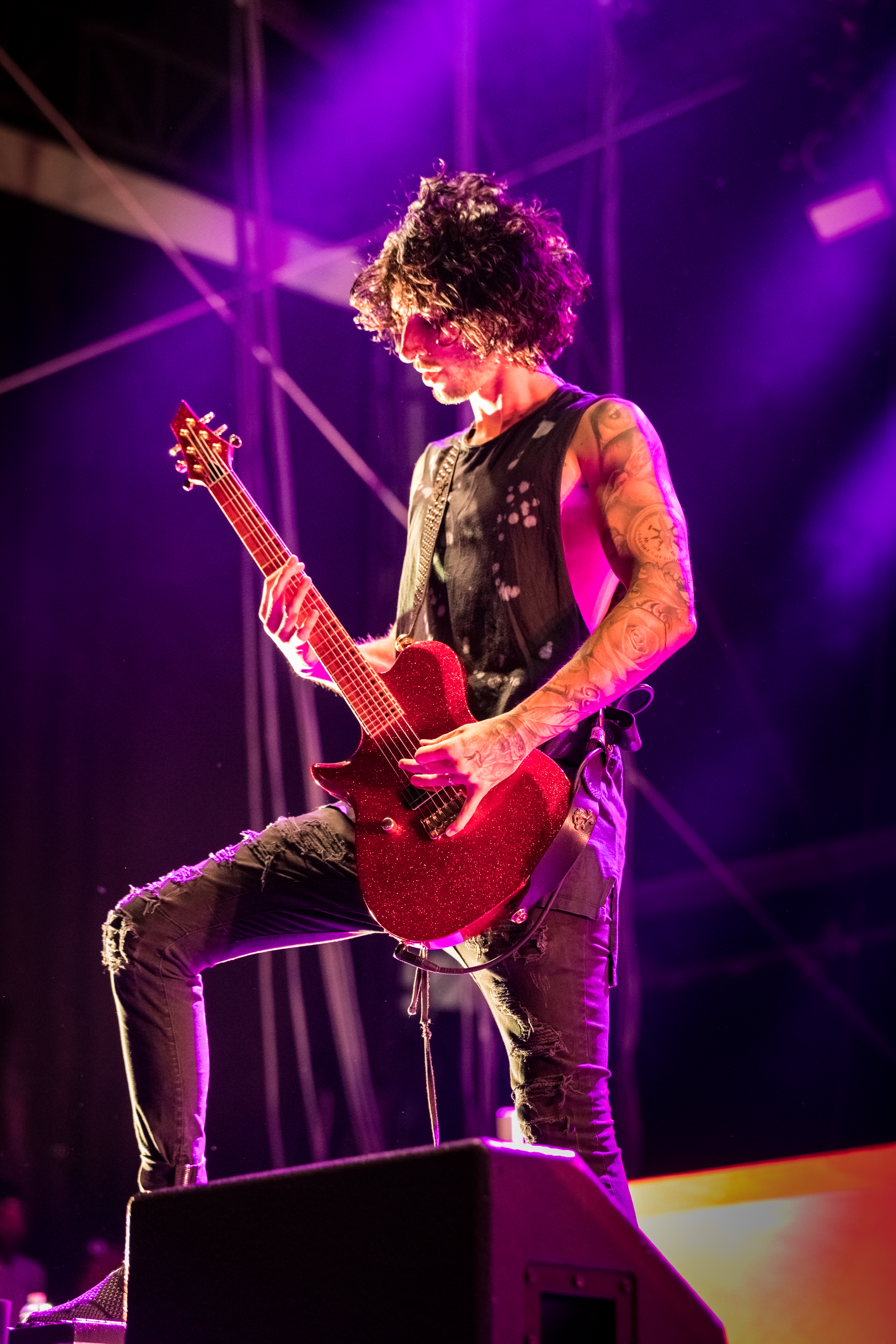
Guitarist Cameron Liddell

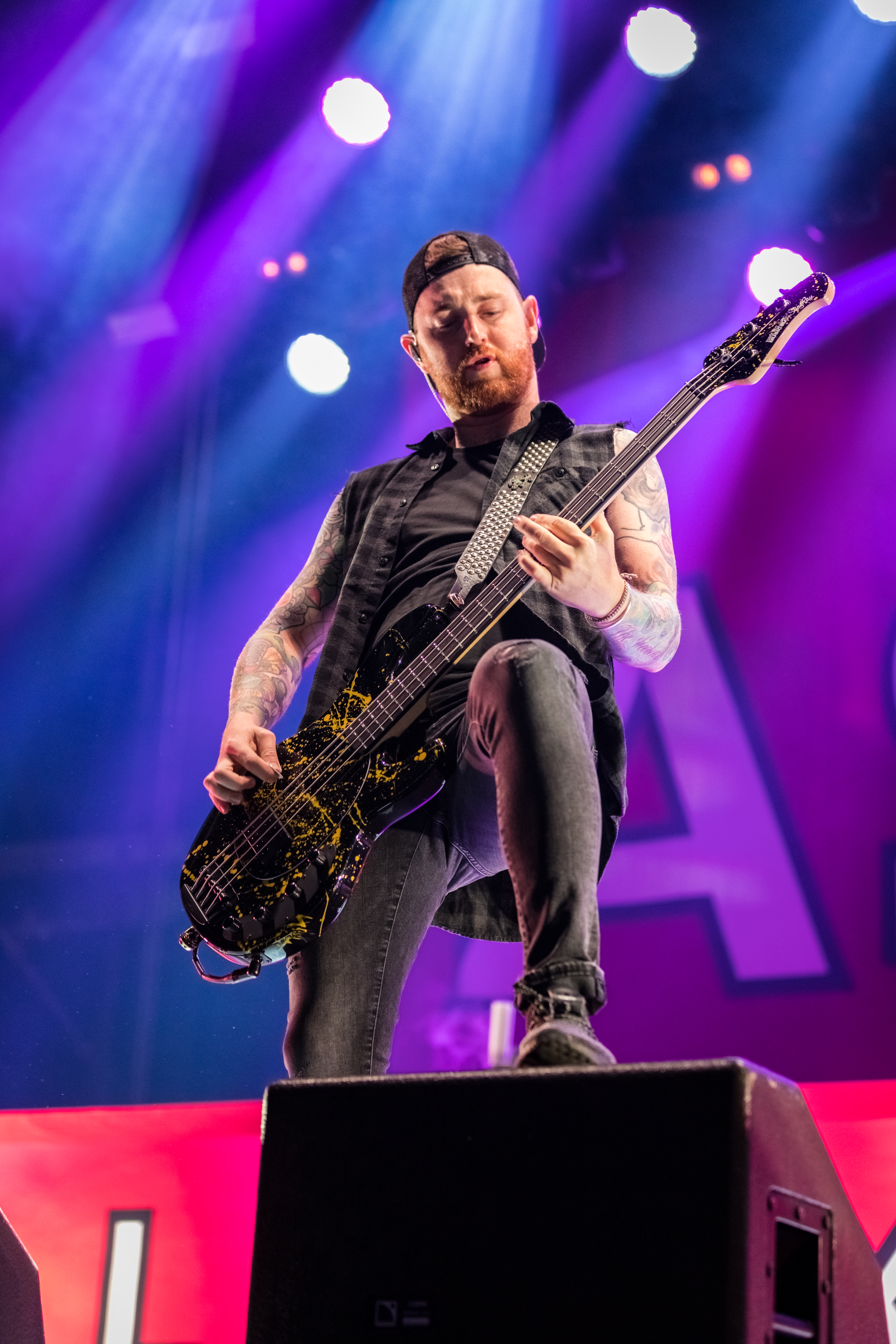
Bassist Sam Bettley

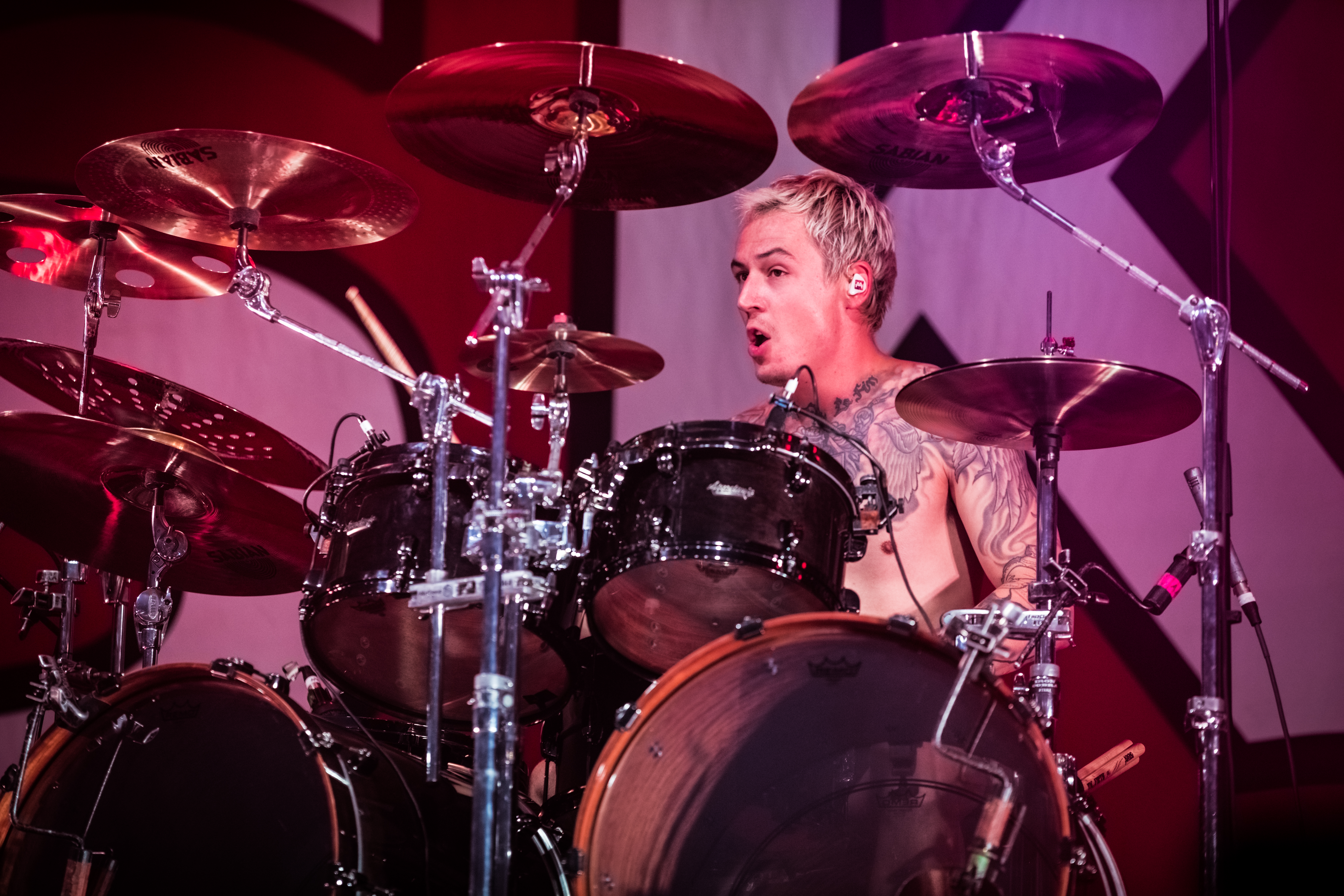
Drummer James Cassells

Current members

- James Cassells – drums (2008–present)
- Cameron Liddell – rhythm guitar (2008–present); lead guitar (2024–present)
- Sam Bettley – bass (2009–present)
- Danny Worsnop – lead vocals (2008–2015, 2016–present); additional guitar (2012–2015, 2016–present); keyboards, programming (2008–2012)

Current touring musicians

- Paul Bartolome – rhythm guitar, backing vocals (2023–present)

Former members

- Ryan Binns – keyboards, programming (2008)
- Joe Lancaster – bass (2008–2009)
- Denis Stoff – lead vocals (2015–2016)
- Ben Bruce – lead guitar, backing and occasional lead vocals (2008–2024); keyboards, programming (2008–2012)

Timeline

== Discography ==
Studio albums

- Stand Up and Scream (2009)
- Reckless & Relentless (2011)
- From Death to Destiny (2013)
- The Black (2016)
- Asking Alexandria (2017)
- Like a House on Fire (2020)
- See What's on the Inside (2021)
- Where Do We Go from Here? (2023)

== Awards ==
Year	Award	Category	Nominated work	Result	Ref.
2011	Kerrang! Awards	Best British Newcomer	Asking Alexandria	Won	
2012	Independent Music Awards	Best Metal/Hardcore Album	Reckless & Relentless	Won	
2012	Kerrang! Awards	Best British Band	Asking Alexandria	Nominated	
2012	Kerrang! Awards	Best Live Band	Asking Alexandria	Nominated	
2012	Kerrang! Awards	Tweeter of the Year	Danny Worsnop	Nominated	
2012	Kerrang! Awards	Hottest Male	Ben Bruce	Won	
2013	Kerrang! Awards	Best British Band	Asking Alexandria	Nominated	
2013	Kerrang! Awards	Hottest Male	Ben Bruce	Won	
2013	Metal Hammer Golden Gods Awards	Breakthrough Artist	Asking Alexandria	Won	
2014	Kerrang! Awards	Best British Band	Asking Alexandria	Nominated	
2014	Kerrang! Awards	Hottest Male	Ben Bruce	Nominated	
2014	Alternative Press Music Awards	Best Live Band	Asking Alexandria	Nominated	
2014	Alternative Press Music Awards	Best International Band	Asking Alexandria	Nominated	
2015	Kerrang! Awards	Best Fanbase	Asking Alexandria	Nominated	
2015	Metal Hammer Golden Gods Awards	Dimebag Darrell Shredder Award	Ben Bruce	Nominated	
2016	Kerrang! Awards	Best Album	The Black	Nominated	
2016	Kerrang! Awards	Best British Band	Asking Alexandria	Won	
2016	Metal Hammer Golden Gods Awards	Best UK Band	Asking Alexandria	Won	
2017	Metal Hammer Golden Gods Awards	Dimebag Darrell Shredder Award	Ben Bruce	Nominated	
2018	Metal Hammer Golden Gods Awards	Best British Band	Asking Alexandria	Nominated	
