= Like a House on Fire (album) =

Studio album by Asking Alexandria
- Released: 15 May 2020
- Genres: Hard rock; pop rock; arena rock; alternative rock
- Length: 52:04
- Label: Sumerian
- Producer: Matt Good

Asking Alexandria chronology
Asking Alexandria (2017)	Like a House on Fire (2020)	See What's on the Inside (2021)

Singles from Like a House on Fire
- 1. "The Violence" Released: 11 July 2019; 2. "They Don't Want What We Want (And They Don't Care)" Released: 12 February 2020; 3. "Antisocialist" Released: 4 March 2020; 4. "Down to Hell" Released: 15 April 2020; 5. "House on Fire" Released: 11 May 2020

Like a House on Fire is the sixth studio album by English rock band Asking Alexandria. It was released on 15 May 2020 through Sumerian Records. It was produced by Matt Good. The album shows the group's continuity of a more straight forward and melodic hard rock sound, as established on their previous self-titled fifth album, while also shift into different genres. The album is also the last release from the band under Sumerian Records.

== Background and promotion ==
On 11 July 2019, the band released their new song called "The Violence". On 6 December, the band unveiled the dubstep remix of "The Violence" by the electronic artist Sikdope.

In early 2020, the band announced their first headline tour in two years, 'Like A House On Fire World Tour', with Falling in Reverse, Wage War and Hyro the Hero. On 11 February 2020, the band announced that a new single called "They Don't Want What We Want (And They Don't Care)" would premiere on Octane on 12 February. On 4 March, the band announced that their sixth studio album, Like a House on Fire, was set for release on 15 May 2020. On the same day, the band released their third single of the album, titled "Antisocialist", and its corresponding music video.

On 15 April, the band released the album's fourth single, "Down to Hell", alongside an accompanying lyric video. On 11 May, four days before the album's release, the band released its fifth single, "House on Fire".

== Composition ==
=== Style ===
The genre of the album has been described primarily as hard rock, pop rock, arena rock, and alternative rock, while exploring elements of other genres such as electronic, electropop, R&B, EDM, pop, post-hardcore, and nu metal.

== Critical reception ==
Professional ratings
Review scores
Source	Rating
AllMusic	3/5 stars
Dead Press!	4/10
Distorted Sound	8/10
Exclaim!	7/10
Kerrang!	4/5 stars
Louder Sound	3/5 stars
New Noise	2.5/5 stars
Rock 'N' Load	8/10
Wall of Sound	10/10

The album received mostly positive reviews, but also mixed reviews from several critics. AllMusic gave the album a positive review but saying, "That said, no longer wading into the mainstream, Asking Alexandria have officially gone swimming, and it'll be up to longtime fans to decide whether or not the water is fine or not." In a less favourable review, Carlos Zelaya of Dead Press! praised the band for their ambition and confidence, but summarised the record as "a largely generic and forgettable effort". Distorted Sound scored the album 8 out of 10 and said: "It would be oblivious not to address the elephant in the room; they've changed. This album, similar to their last self-titled release will, unfortunately, be cast into the shadows of its previous work regardless of whether the work is actually good. Fans need to stray away from their gate-keeping attitude and listen to Like a House on Fire as if it isn't the same skinny jeans, flippy black hair, Hot Topic poster boys from 2010... because it's not. 2020 has seen ASKING ALEXANDRIA into a whole new era of maturity and growth. Arguably their transition here hasn't been steady and hopefully, their next body of work will really hone into a newly established sound that doesn't lack in some areas but for the most part, this is refreshing and well-needed change."

Max Morin of Exclaim! gave it 7 out of 10 and said: "Like a House on Fire won't win over the haters, but it is a massive improvement over anything Asking Alexandria have done before. The bar wasn't high, but credit where credit is due." Kerrang! gave the album 4 out of 5 and stated: "Like a House on Fire is an album that ebbs, flows and branches into numerous shapes and directions. It's also yet another Asking Alexandria album that will divide opinion. And, once again, the band themselves are unlikely to care." Louder Sound gave the album a positive review and stated: "Asking Alexandria have committed admirably to their new incarnation, but too much of Like a House on Fire doesn't quite nail the big finale."

New Noise gave the album 2.5 out of 5 and stated: "By the time Like a House on Fire approaches the final stretch, the main question becomes 'Who is this record for, exactly?' The band have made it pretty clear that this new sonic evolution is here to stay, so old school fans and only-metalcore crew need no longer apply. As for their desire to fill packed-out stadiums, some of these alt-rock ballads might just get them there. (When that's likely to eventuate is another question altogether.) Either way, Asking Alexandria seem more than determined to reach their goal—whether fans are along for the ride or not." Rock 'N' Load praised the album saying, "As with any new direction of a band, there will be some that don't approve, some that go with it as they follow the band and there will be those that become fans of the band due to this sound, however as far as Asking Alexandria are concerned, this is them and there is no denying that there is a lot of energy in the album and is full of sing-a-long opportunities and any you could pick any song on the album and it will sound great live, as the band is carried on the voices of the audience." Wall of Sound gave the album a perfect score 10/10 and saying: "The Asking Alexandria guys have never been afraid to be true to who they are and to grow and evolve as a band. Like a House on Fire is absolutely no exception to this and I truly believe they've knocked it out of the park with this record. There isn't really any tracks on the record that I would consider as weak or mediocre and each track is there for a reason. The expectations they've only ever tried to live up to are their own and I admire them for staying true to themselves and really not giving a f*** what the haters have to say."

== Track listing ==
Like a House on Fire track listing
No.	Title	Length
1.	"House on Fire"	3:33
2.	"They Don't Want What We Want (And They Don't Care)"	3:15
3.	"Down to Hell"	3:16
4.	"Antisocialist"	3:36
5.	"I Don't Need You" (featuring Grace Grundy)	3:42
6.	"All Due Respect"	3:55
7.	"Take Some Time"	3:25
8.	"One Turns to None"	3:04
9.	"It's Not Me (It's You)"	2:55
10.	"Here's to Starting Over"	3:17
11.	"What's Gonna Be"	3:25
12.	"Give You Up"	3:33
13.	"In My Blood"	3:31
14.	"The Violence"	3:28
15.	"Lorazepam"	4:02
Total length:		52:04

== Personnel ==
Credits adapted from album's liner notes.

Asking Alexandria

- Danny Worsnop – lead vocals, additional guitar
- Ben Bruce – lead guitar, backing vocals, vocals on tracks 1 and 9
- Cameron Liddell – rhythm guitar
- Sam Bettley – bass
- James Cassells – drums

Additional musicians

- Grace Grundy – guest vocals on track 5

Additional personnel

- Matt Good – production, engineering, mixing
- Joe Grayem – co-production on track 14
- Brand Birtwistle – co-production on track 14
- Sam Malko – co-production on track 14
- Ted Jensen – mastering
- Diony Sepulveda – management
- Mike Jakubow – promotion
- Ash Avildsen and Nick Walters – A&R
- Daniel McBride – art direction
- Brian Morgante – artwork, layout
- Sanjay Parikh – photography

== Charts ==
Chart performance for Like a House on Fire
Chart (2020)	Peak position
Scottish Albums (Official Charts)	52
Swiss Albums (Schweizer Hitparade)	65
UK Album Downloads (Official Charts)	9
UK Independent Albums (Official Charts)	14
UK Rock & Metal Albums (OCC)	3
US Billboard 200	80
US Top Album Sales (Billboard)	6
US Independent Albums (Billboard)	9
US Top Hard Rock Albums (Billboard)	2
US Top Rock Albums (Billboard)	9
