= Psycho (Asking Alexandria song) =

2023 song by Asking Alexandria

Single by Asking Alexandria

from the album Where Do We Go from Here?
- Released: June 16, 2023
- Length: 3:56
- Label: Better Noise
- Songwriters: Matt Good; Ben Bruce; Danny Worsnop; James Cassells; Paul Alexander Bartolome
- Producer: Good

Asking Alexandria singles chronology
"Dark Void" (2023)	"Psycho" (2023)	"Bad Blood" (2023)

Music video
- "Psycho" on YouTube

"Psycho" is a song by English rock band Asking Alexandria. It is the band's second single from their eighth studio album, Where Do We Go from Here?. It peaked at No. 1 on the Billboard Mainstream Rock Airplay chart.

== Background and release ==
Guitarist Ben Bruce said that "Psycho" is about feeling "trapped inside your own head" by one's vices and downfalls, including being in a relationship that does not work, feeling unable to stop drinking or doing drugs, or being stuck in a job one hates. He described battling yourself in your own head and wondering "why am I still here?" and "why do I keep doing these things?", and said that "we all feel a little bit crazy". Bruce said the band wanted the song to sound as though it could have appeared on both Like a House on Fire and From Death to Destiny. He described the writing process as a "really enjoyable experience" to "meld those two eras of Asking Alexandria together".

Frontman Danny Worsnop described the track as a "fun, little out-there trip of a song" and said it was difficult to describe because it had "so much life in it".

On June 16, 2023, the band released "Psycho" as the first official radio single from Where Do We Go from Here?, alongside the track "Bad Blood" and an accompanying music video.

== Reception ==
Ricky Aarons of Wall of Sound described "Psycho" as a "radio rock" single and said that Worsnop "shines" on the song.

== Track listing ==
All tracks are written by Matt Good, Ben Bruce, Danny Worsnop, James Cassells, and Paul Alexander Bartolome.

"Psycho" single
No.	Title	Length
1.	"Psycho"	3:56
2.	"Bad Blood"	3:30
3.	"Dark Void"	3:52
Total length:		11:19

== Personnel ==
Credits adapted from Apple Music.

Asking Alexandria

- Danny Worsnop – lead vocals
- Ben Bruce – lead guitar, backing vocals
- Cameron Liddell – rhythm guitar
- Sam Bettley – bass
- James Cassells – drums

Additional personnel

- Matt Good – production, mixing
- Howie Weinberg – mastering
- Will Borza – mastering

== Chart performance ==
By July 7, 2023, "Psycho" had been the No. 1 Most Added and No. 1 Most Increased Played Track at Active Rock radio for two consecutive weeks. On the October 7, 2023-dated issue of the Billboard Mainstream Rock Airplay chart, the song reached No. 1, becoming the band's second No. 1 on the chart after "Alone Again" in 2021. It was the band's highest-ranking entry on the Billboard Rock & Alternative Airplay chart, peaking at No. 8. It also became the band's second No. 1 single on Mediabase's Active Rock radio chart.

=== Weekly charts ===
Weekly chart performance for "Psycho"
Chart (2023)	Peak position
US Rock & Alternative Airplay (Billboard)	8
US Mainstream Rock Airplay (Billboard)	1

=== Year-end charts ===
Year-end chart performance for "Psycho"
Chart (2023)	Position
US Mainstream Rock Airplay (Billboard)	22
