= Life Gone Wild =

EP by Asking Alexandria
- Released: 21 December 2010
- Genre: Electronicore; hard rock; brostep; glam metal
- Length: 23:24
- Label: Sumerian
- Producer: Asking Alexandria

Asking Alexandria chronology
Stand Up and Scream (2009)	Life Gone Wild (2010)	Reckless & Relentless (2011)

Professional ratings
Review scores
Source	Rating
Under the Gun Review	4/10

Life Gone Wild is the second EP by English rock band Asking Alexandria. It was released on 21 December 2010, through Sumerian Records and contains "Breathless", dubstep remixes of "A Single Moment of Sincerity" and "Not the American Average", two Skid Row covers of "18 and Life" and "Youth Gone Wild", and an unreleased demo version of "I Was Once, Possibly, Maybe, Perhaps a Cowboy King". The cover art is similar to the cover of Skid Row's self-titled debut album from 1989. The title comes from two Skid Row song titles combined, "18 and Life" and "Youth Gone Wild".

== Background ==
In an Alternative Press interview, Ben Bruce showed concern for the EP's reception, questioning if people would like it. He said it had influences from 1980s "classic rock", specifically the Skid Row cover songs. He said the "Sincerity" and "American Average" remixes were done to "broad the horizons and introduce people to another genre of music we love to listen to." The demo of "I Was Once, Possibly, Maybe, Perhaps a Cowboy King" is a "version that most people won't be familiar with and that you can't buy anywhere else." In a Blue Devil Hub review, Tim Karan wrote that the songs on the EP were a mix of genres, none of which seemed to fit the band.

== Track listing ==
All tracks are written by Danny Worsnop, Ben Bruce and James Cassells, except where noted.

No.	Title	Writer(s)	Length
1.	"Youth Gone Wild" (Skid Row cover)	Rachel Bolan, Dave Sabo	3:17
2.	"18 and Life" (Skid Row cover)	Bolan, Sabo	3:48
3.	"A Single Moment of Sincerity" (Bare remix)		3:46
4.	"Not the American Average" (Voorny remix)		4:21
5.	"I Was Once, Possibly, Maybe, Perhaps a Cowboy King" (Demo)		4:01
6.	"Breathless" (Demo from Reckless & Relentless)		4:09
Total length:			23:24

Enhanced CD Content:
No.	Title	Length
1.	"A Prophecy" (Music video)
2.	"Final Episode (Let's Change the Channel)" (Music video)
3.	"If You Can't Ride Two Horses at Once... You Should Get Out of the Circus" (Music video)
4.	"A Prophecy" (Behind the Scenes Footage)
5.	"In-Depth Interviews with Asking Alexandria"
6.	"Los Angeles Photoshoot by Hristo Shindov"

== Personnel ==
Asking Alexandria

- Danny Worsnop – lead vocals, keyboards, programming
- Ben Bruce – lead guitar, backing vocals, keyboards, programming
- Cameron Liddell – rhythm guitar
- Sam Bettley – bass
- James Cassells – drums

Additional personnel

- Joey Sturgis – production on "Breathless" demo version
