= The Dead Lay Waiting =

UK musical group

- Origin: Swindon, Wiltshire, England, United Kingdom
- Genres: Metalcore, melodic metalcore, progressive metal
- Years active: 2007–2013
- Members: Lucy Lucas (Vocals); Ben Connett (Lead Guitar); Steve Franklin (Rhythm Guitar); Sam Sara (Bass Guitar); Tom Shrimpton (Drums)
- Past members: James Mackellar-Still; Justin Wilkinson; Azz Willoughby
- Website: thedeadlaywaiting.co.uk

The Dead Lay Waiting were an English metalcore band from Swindon, Wiltshire, formed in 2007 by the means of a local rock school. The group included Lucy Lucas (vocals), Ben Connett (lead guitar), Steve Franklin (rhythm guitar), Sam Sara (bass guitar) and Tom Shrimpton (drums).

The band's music is a diverse mix of extreme metal genres, such as hardcore metal, melodic metalcore and even elements of heavy metal. To achieve a chaotic and cacophonic sound, the band uses complex time signatures, polyrhythmic composition, blast beats, sampling, keyboard effects and intricate layered production.

== History ==
=== The early days 2007–2009 ===
At age 16, Lucas and Shrimpton attended Swindon's Rock School, teaming up with three other musicians to form the band. During their apprenticeship days, the band were mentored by Jamie Hunt of the progressive- groove-metal band Biomechanical. After a few months of writing material and playing a handful of shows, the band entered a regional battle of the bands competition, which they won, collecting sufficient funds to allow them to go into a studio and record a four-track demo.

Produced by Stu Mckay of the now-defunct deathcore band Eternal Lord and a past member of the hardcore-punk band Your Demise, the demo created much interest, including a demo review in Powerplay Magazine, as well as securing a slot at their first major festival, the Bloodstock Open Air, held at Catton Hall in Walton-upon-Trent, Derbyshire.

Following this success, the band signed a recording contract with the British independent label Rising Records. Having returned from a short set of shows, the band entered the studio in April 2009 to record their debut album.

Just after the recording stint, Justin Wilkinson was replaced by Connett. Connett – previously a member of the band Scarlet Hourglass, who had just supported the thrash-metal band Slayer – made his debut performance with the band at the inaugural Welsh Hammerfest held at Pontins Holiday Village in Prestatyn.

=== 2010 ===
The band released their debut album We Rise during January 2010, receiving encouraging reviews from magazines including Kerrang!, Metal Hammer and Big Cheese, as well as a number of British and other European online websites. The album's opening track, "Anxiety of an Obsession", was also released as the band's first official music video; the video was directed by David Kenny of Genertik Productions.

To promote the album the band embarked on tour throughout the UK and Europe with label mates, the band Bleed from Within and the death-metal band Trigger the Bloodshed on Trigger the Bloodshed's Degenerate tour, culminating with the band's debut appearance at the 2010 Download Festival, held in Donington Park, Leicestershire.

Later in 2010, the band returned to the studio to commence recording their follow-up album, Almost Heaven, an album consisting of 14 tracks and nearly 60 minutes of music. It was during the recording of the title track – a ten-minute epic track already consisting of both a female and male voice choirs, string quartets and church organs – that the idea of having a narrator came to mind and in particular Barry Clayton; Clayton had been the voice behind the introduction to heavy-metal band Iron Maiden's album Number of the Beast (1982). Clayton agreed to appear on the track and the project was completed when various band members joined forces with John Mitchell of Outhouse Studios to apply the final touches to the album.

Shortly after the recording session, James Mackellar-Still decided to move away from the area and leave the band, to be replaced by Sara on bass whilst Azz Willoughby switched to guitar.

=== Since 2011 ===
In 2011, the band was nominated for the Best British Newcomer award by the readers of Kerrang!. Shortly after this, the band announced a tour with label mates Confined Within as well as being nominated for the Metal Hammer Golden Gods Awards for the Best Underground Band.

In conjunction with the awards and for the second consecutive year, the band were invited back to perform at the Download Festival in June, meaning the band had 24 hours to return from a one-off show in Copenhagen, Denmark, supporting rock band Black Veil Brides. The festival weekend ultimately concluded with the band performing on the Metal Hammer Golden Gods Boat as it made its way along the River Thames en route to the award ceremony at The O2 Arena in London.

June also saw the release of the Almost Heaven album, which subsequently received much praise within the music industry. This prompted the final change to the current line-up when Franklin replaced Willoughby on guitar.

Despite the timing of Willoughby's departure, the band decided to release two music videos from the album, "The Days I'm Gone" and "Burnt to Ashes". "The Days I'm Gone" reached number six in the Scuzz television playlist.

The band were given their own one-hour Take-Over episode programme to choose and play their favourite music videos. The album artwork was also voted number 18 by Kerrang Radio as best album cover.

During the summer months, the band was invited to attend the Paul Harries Photographic Slipknot Exhibition at the Strand Gallery in London, whereby the band met Corey Taylor as well as other band members of Slipknot.

Over the following months, the band continued to be featured in UK music magazines, including Metal Hammer, Big Cheese, Terrorizer and Kerrang!. Before embarking for a two-month tour with the Irish band Death of a Salesman, the band were invited to record a live session at Capital Radio XFM, the second-largest radio station in the UK.

In preparation of the Almost Heaven January 2012 United States release date, the band teamed up with Adrenaline PR, who had previously worked with bands including As I Lay Dying, Dimmu Borgir, Lamb of God, Killswitch Engage and Machine Head. This partnership saw the band feature as a "Band to Watch" in the 100th edition of Revolver, as well as a feature in the "100 Bands You Need to Know" within a New Year's edition of Alternative Press.

In 2012, the band went to Barbados with the intention of recording a mini-CD at the Juma Recording studios, as well as shooting two new videos for a late-spring release. However, despite recording the material and shooting the videos as planned and to schedule, due to circumstances out of the band's control, the material was never released. As such, in an attempt to rejuvenate momentum the band went on tour across the UK and Europe with the hardcore band Scarred by Beauty.

On the band's return, they focused upon writing new material for their forthcoming album, before touring once again. This time, in conjunction with LPO and Live Nation, the band confirmed dates for their co-headline The Killing Is Dead Tour with fellow-nominated Best British Newcomer band, the alternative-rock band Fearless Vampire Killers. Just prior to the tour, Shrimpton's "Riser Drummer" interview featured in the July edition of Drummer Magazine.

On Tuesday 8 October 2013, the Band announced via their Facebook page that, due to conflicting ideas with regards to the band's future direction, they would be disbanding the group. However, it was stated that, whilst Lucy Lucas would be moving on with her musical career and later form the orchestral, melodic metal band Solace in Nightmares with Matt Seaborne, the other 4 members of TDLW would be working together under a separate name, this new band would become Sleep Inertia. The Dead Lay Waiting played their final show at the Underworld in Camden.

In 2022 Lucy Lucas announced that she would be teaming up with Dutch producer Chris Twiest to form the musical art project 'CONVOKE' featuring collaborations from other creators such as Laura Kate Dale and Sarah Jezebel Deva.

== Band members ==
- Lucy Lucas – Vocals (Since 2007)
- Ben Connett – Lead Guitar (Since 2009)
- Steve Franklin – Rhythm Guitar (Since 2011)
- Sam Sara – Bass Guitar (Since 2010)
- Tom Shrimpton – Drums (Since 2007)

=== Past members ===
- James Mackellar-Still – Lead Guitar (2007–2010)
- Justin Wilkinson – Rhythm Guitar (2007–2009)
- Aaron Willoughby – Bass Guitar (2008–2011)

== Discography of The Dead Lay Waiting ==
=== Albums ===
- We Rise (2010)

Track List:

1. Anxiety of an Obsession

2. 5OS

3. I'll Hunt You Down

4. You Look Better When You're Dead

5. What We've Done

6. Set Me Free

7. We Rise

8. Just in Time

9. We Stand as One

10. The Last Stand

11. I Will Return

12. Show Your Worth

- Almost Heaven (2011)

Track List:

1. Intro

2. Wake Up

3. This Day Will Be Your Last

4. Take Me Away

5. Decaying King

6. Burnt to Ashes

7. Open Your Fucking Eyes

8. Always Ask Why

9. Voices

10. The Days I'm Gone

11. Interlude

12. Choke on Your Words

13. Pray to Me

14. Look at Us Now

15. Almost Heaven

=== EP's ===
- Memories of a Massacre (2007)
- Ascent of the Murder (2013)

Track List:

1. The Dream Is Over

2. Roses Are Grey

3. Cyrus

4. Blind Preacher

=== Demos ===
- The Dead Lay Waiting (2008)

Track List:

1. The Last Stand

2. I Hate My Girl

3. Burtle the Turtle

4. Would You Like Some Sugar With Your Tea Nan (Demo)

5. Warsaw (Demo)

=== Singles ===
- Anxiety of an Obsession (2009)
- Roses Are Grey (2013)

== Music videos ==
- Anxiety of an Obsession (2010)
- The Days I'm Gone (2011)
- Burnt to Ashes (2011)

== See also ==
- List of bands from England
- List of metalcore bands
- List of progressive-metal bands
- British rock music
