= Reckless & Relentless =

Studio album by Asking Alexandria
- Released: 5 April 2011
- Recorded: June–September 2010
- Studio: Foundation Recording Studios, Connersville, Indiana, U.S.
- Genre: Metalcore; electronicore; post-hardcore
- Length: 42:25
- Label: Sumerian
- Producer: Joey Sturgis

Asking Alexandria chronology
| Life Gone Wild (2010) | Reckless & Relentless (2011) | Stepped Up and Scratched (2011) |

Singles from Reckless & Relentless
- 1. "Morte et Dabo" Released: 15 February 2011; 2. "Breathless" Released: 18 February 2011; 3. "Someone, Somewhere" Released: 25 February 2011; 4. "Closure" Released: 5 July 2011; 5. "To the Stage" Released: 12 July 2011; 6. "Reckless & Relentless" Released: 15 July 2012

Reckless & Relentless is the second studio album by English rock band Asking Alexandria. It was released on 5 April 2011 through Sumerian Records and was produced by Joey Sturgis. Announced on 22 December 2009, recording for the album began in June 2010 at the Foundation Recording Studios in Connersville, Indiana and ended in the fall of that year. The songs "Welcome", "Reckless & Relentless", "To the Stage", "Dear Insanity", and "A Lesson Never Learned" make up the short film Through Sin + Self-Destruction, which features the band's "party hard" lifestyle.

== Background and promotion ==
Reckless & Relentless was recorded during the summer and autumn of 2010 at the Foundation Recording Studios in Connersville, Indiana. The first official confirmation of the sophomore full-length was on 22 December 2009, wherein Asking Alexandria announced that they were to start the works on a second album in January. They informed that they were to be streaming parts of the writing process through a webcam feed via the service Stickam. It was also announced that they will be entering the studio on 1 September 2010, again with producer Joey Sturgis, who produced the band's debut album Stand Up and Scream. The band later announced that they were scheduled to begin recording on 22 June 2010. Asking Alexandria confirmed through an interview with Shred News that the album would be released on 5 April featuring 12 tracks. However, the original album was supposed to contain 13 tracks and 3 bonus iTunes tracks. This didn't make it because they didn't wish to delay the album release date. In the same interview, the band informed that a title was not yet established. One song, "Breathless" was played live to promote the album, and was released with their Life Gone Wild EP.

During an interview with Fallen Blue, Danny Worsnop said of the album cover, "We wanted something shocking, so we had the famous porn actress, Belladonna, just sitting in The Dirty Room." Danny further discussed, "Someone, Somewhere", a song off the new album as the first one "that I wrote the lyrics using my emotions as a backdrop."

The first official single from the album entitled "Morte et Dabo" was released on 15 February 2011, as announced beforehand by the band. Pre-orders for Reckless & Relentless were made available on 3 March 2011. A music video for "Closure" was released 5 July 2011 and a music video for "To the Stage" was released on 12 July 2011.

== Music ==
Musically, Reckless & Relentless is primarily a metalcore album that includes only a few elements of euro-trance compared to Stand Up and Scream and also has influences of classic rock and metal. It also has influences of deathcore as displayed on the song "Morte et Dabo". It debuted at number 9 on the Billboard 200, selling more than 31,000 copies in its first week.

The album also has elements of death metal, emo and pop music. The material has drawn comparisons to Suicide Silence, Meshuggah, Killswitch Engage, Marilyn Manson. The Black Dahlia Murder, My Chemical Romance, Job for a Cowboy, Skinny Puppy, and Blink-182.

== Critical reception ==
Professional ratings
Review scores
| Source | Rating |
|---|---|
| AllMusic | 4/5 stars |
| Alternative Press | 3.5/5 stars |
| Mind Equals Blown | 4/10 stars |
| Revolver | 4/5 stars |
| Rock Sound | 8/10 stars |
| Ultimate Guitar | 8/10 stars |

Reckless & Relentless received generally positive reviews from music critics. Phil Freeman from AllMusic gave the album a positive review, saying, "What separates Asking Alexandria from most of their peers is an awareness of classic rock & roll dynamics – some of the riffs they write are straightforward updates of Guns N' Roses or Skid Row (two of whose songs they covered on their Life Gone Wild EP), and they're as interested in getting listeners singing along as moshing." Alternative Press also gave the album a positive review, saying, "Asking Alexandria haven't radically changed their sound, but there's enough evolution on Reckless & Relentless to convince any listener that they're more than metalcore also-rans or one-trick ponies".

== Commercial performance ==
Reckless & Relentless debuted at number 9 on the Billboard 200, selling more than 31,000 copies within its first week. It spent 7 weeks on the chart whilst also debuting within the top 5 of the Billboard Rock Albums, Hard Rock Albums and Independent Albums charts. It also peaked at number 30 and 98 in Australia and the United Kingdom. Reckless & Relentless has sold over 161,000 copies in the U.S. alone.

== Track listing ==
All tracks are written by Danny Worsnop, Ben Bruce and James Cassells, except where noted. All credits according to ASCAP

| No. | Title | Writer(s) | Length |
|---|---|---|---|
| 1. | "Welcome" | | 1:49 |
| 2. | "Dear Insanity" | | 3:09 |
| 3. | "Closure" | Worsnop, Bruce, Cassells, Sam Bettley, Cameron Liddell | 3:58 |
| 4. | "A Lesson Never Learned" | | 3:54 |
| 5. | "To the Stage" | | 3:30 |
| 6. | "Dedication" | | 1:03 |
| 7. | "Someone, Somewhere" | | 3:36 |
| 8. | "Breathless" | | 4:09 |
| 9. | "The Match" | Worsnop, Bruce, Cassells, Bettley, Liddell | 4:15 |
| 10. | "Another Bottle Down" | | 3:34 |
| 11. | "Reckless & Relentless" | Worsnop, Bruce, Cassells, Bettley, Liddell | 4:08 |
| 12. | "Morte et Dabo" | Worsnop, Bruce, Cassells, Bettley, Liddell | 5:14 |
| Total length: | | | 42:25 |

Best Buy bonus tracks
| No. | Title | Length |
|---|---|---|
| 13. | "When Everyday's the Weekend" (Big Chocolate remix) | 3:51 |
| 14. | "Nobody Don't Dance No More" (Noah D remix) | 3:49 |
| 15. | "If You Can't Ride Two Horses at Once... You Should Get Out of the Circus" (Noah D remix) | 3:53 |
| 16. | "I Was Once, Possibly, Maybe, Perhaps a Cowboy King" (Robotsonics remix) | 5:31 |
| 17. | "A Prophecy" (Big Chocolate remix) | 4:26 |
| Total length: | | 62:52 |

Hot Topic bonus tracks
| No. | Title | Length |
|---|---|---|
| 13. | "Final Episode (Let's Change the Channel)" (Borgore's Die Bitch remix) | 4:12 |
| 14. | "A Candlelit Dinner with Inamorta" (Run DMT remix) | 4:14 |
| 15. | "A Prophecy" (Big Chocolate Electro remix) | 4:17 |
| Total length: | | 54:06 |

Japanese bonus track
| No. | Title | Length |
|---|---|---|
| 13. | "Right Now (Na Na Na)" (Akon cover) | 4:20 |
| Total length: | | 46:45 |

== Personnel ==
Credits for Reckless & Relentless adapted from AllMusic.

Asking Alexandria

- Danny Worsnop – lead vocals, keyboards, programming
- Ben Bruce – lead guitar, backing vocals, keyboards, programming, co-lead vocals on track 4
- Cameron Liddell – rhythm guitar
- Sam Bettley – bass
- James Cassells – drums

Additional musicians

- James Murray – composition, spoken words on "Dedication"

Additional personnel

- Joey Sturgis – production, engineering, mixing, mastering
- Nick Sampson – engineering, editing
- Shawn Keith and Nick Walters – A&R
- Daniel Wagner – logo
- Daniel McBride – layout
- Paul Harries – photography
- George Vallee – publicity

== Charts ==
Chart performance for Reckless & Relentless
| Chart (2011) | Peak position |
|---|---|
| Australian Albums (ARIA) | 30 |
| Canadian Albums (Nielsen SoundScan) | 40 |
| UK Albums (OCC) | 98 |
| UK Independent Albums (OCC) | 15 |
| UK Rock & Metal Albums (OCC) | 7 |
| US Billboard 200 | 9 |
| US Independent Albums (Billboard) | 3 |
| US Top Hard Rock Albums (Billboard) | 2 |
| US Top Rock Albums (Billboard) | 4 |
