= The Death of Me (Asking Alexandria song) =

2013 single by Asking Alexandria

Single by Asking Alexandria

from the album From Death to Destiny
- Released: 28 March 2013
- Recorded: 2013
- Genre: Metalcore; alternative metal; symphonic rock; hard rock
- Length: 4:18
- Label: Sumerian
- Songwriters: Danny Worsnop; Ben Bruce; James Cassells

Asking Alexandria singles chronology
"Run Free" (2012)	"The Death of Me" (2013)	"The Death of Me (Rock Mix)" (2013)

Music video
- "The Death of Me" on YouTube

"The Death of Me" is a song by English rock band Asking Alexandria. It is the band's third single from their third studio album, From Death to Destiny. The single was released on 28 March 2013 via the Sumerian Records YouTube page.

== Track listings ==
Digital 45

1. The Death of Me - 4:18
2. The Death of Me (Rock Mix) - 3:24

== Rock Mix ==
"The Death of Me (Rock Mix)"

Single by Asking Alexandria

from the album From Death to Destiny
- Released: 16 April 2013
- Length: 3:24
- Songwriters: Danny Worsnop; Ben Bruce; James Cassells

Asking Alexandria singles chronology
"The Death of Me" (2013)	"The Death of Me (Rock Mix)" (2013)	"Killing You" (2013)

On 16 April 2013, the band released a 'rock mix' for the song as the fourth single of the album. Later, on 22 July, they released a music video for the 'rock mix'. The rock mix was featured as a bonus track for the From Death to Destiny album. It was mixed by Kevin Churko, who is known for his work with Ozzy Osbourne, Five Finger Death Punch, and In This Moment.

=== Music video ===
The music video starts when a man (portrayed by Danny Worsnop) finds a kid and brings him to a dark room, with imprisoned and naked women, where the man and his band performs. The women are in vending machines, and the man provides a coin for the boy. Each of the imprisoned women represent different addictions: cocaine, pills, alcohol, and heroin. Each of the women try to 'persuade' the boy to take them. In the end, the boy "buys into" the heroin addiction/girl. Money starts flowing from the ceiling, indicating the massive amounts of money spent on the chosen addiction. The other girls become angry, and all of them break out of the vending machines. This represents certain band member's addictions, which started as a young boy. The song itself is about Worsnop overcoming, and ending, his addiction. The video uses the rock mix of the song.

== Other versions ==
On 1 March 2014, Asking Alexandria released via YouTube an acoustic version of the song.

== Personnel ==
- Danny Worsnop – lead vocals, additional guitar
- Ben Bruce – lead guitar, backing vocals
- Cameron Liddell – rhythm guitar
- Sam Bettley – bass
- James Cassells – drums
