= Danny Worsnop =

English singer (born 1990)

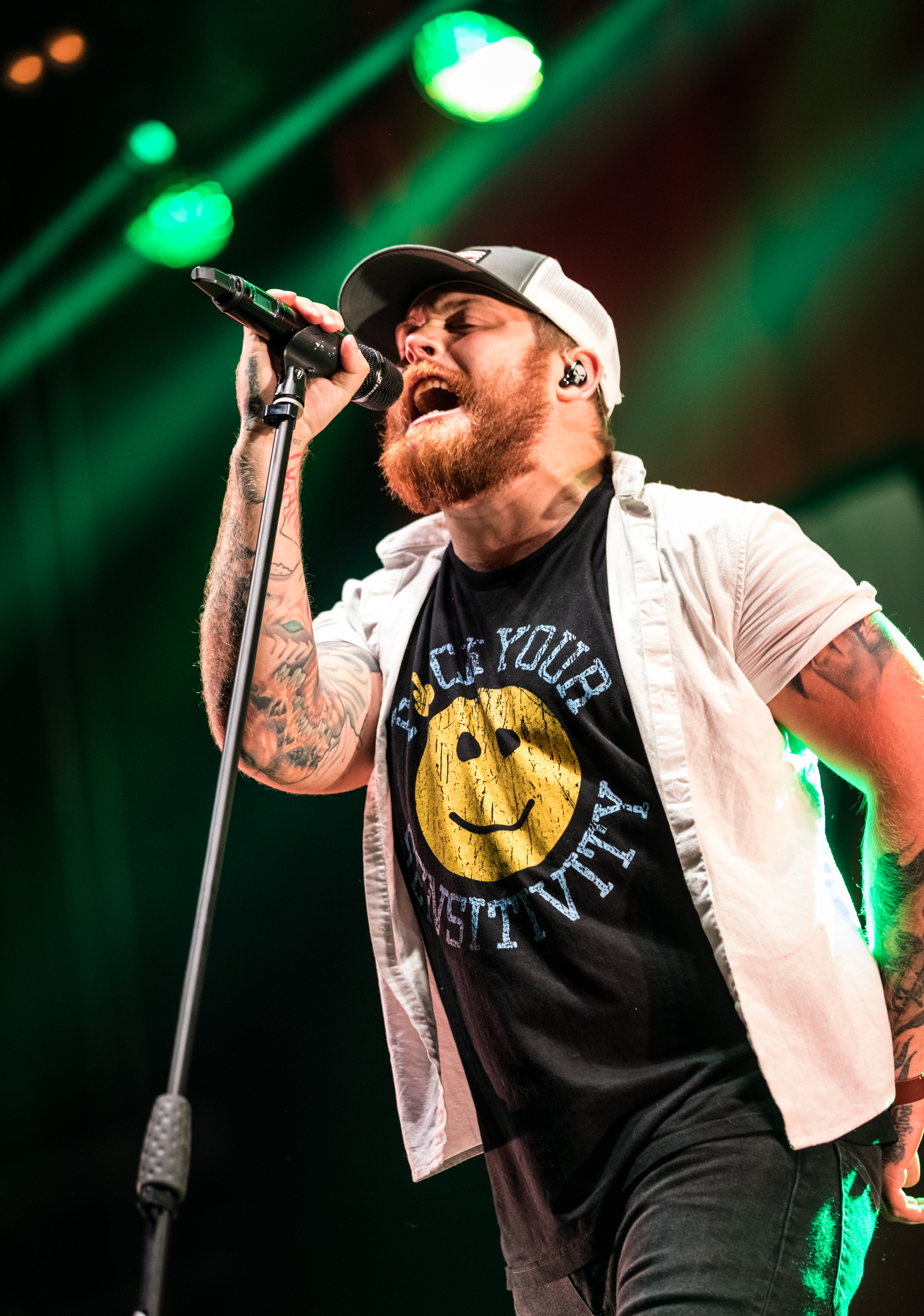
- Worsnop performing with Asking Alexandria in 2018

Background information
- Born: Danny Robert Worsnop; 4 September 1990 (age 36); Beverley, East Riding of Yorkshire, England
- Origin: Gilberdyke, East Riding of Yorkshire, England
- Genres: Metalcore; heavy metal; post-hardcore; hard rock; country rock; blues; electronicore (early)
- Occupations: Singer; musician; songwriter
- Instruments: Vocals; guitar; piano; keyboards
- Years active: 2008–present
- Labels: Better Noise; Sumerian; Monstercat; Roadrunner; Earache
- Member of: Asking Alexandria; We Are Harlot
- Website: dannyworsnop.com

Danny Robert Worsnop (born 4 September 1990) is an English singer most prominently known as the lead vocalist of rock bands Asking Alexandria and We Are Harlot. He has worked with several artists including I See Stars, Papa Roach, With One Last Breath, Breathe Carolina, Memphis May Fire, The Word Alive, All That Remains, The Funeral Portrait, and Testarossa, providing guest vocals on several songs.

Worsnop also maintains a solo music career. He released his debut solo full-length country-inspired studio album, The Long Road Home, in 2017. He released his second studio album, Shades of Blue, in 2019 through Sumerian Records, followed by the two standalone singles "Another You" and "Happy".

Worsnop performs both screaming and clean vocals. Jake Richardson of Loudwire described him as "a metalcore vocalist more in the guise of a classic rock frontman."

== Early life ==
Danny Worsnop was born on 4 September 1990 in Beverley, England and grew up in the small village of Gilberdyke with his parents Philip and Sharon and his younger sister Kelly. Worsnop himself has stated that his love for music started when he was a toddler when he would make "beats" using empty boxes and pots, but started playing instruments at the age of 8, his first being the violin and took lessons to play it, a year later learning the trumpet, and another year later he was playing at his local village school orchestra. Eventually he would take up guitar and bass and became more influenced by rock and metal music, and was self-taught. He initially planned to join the military in hopes of becoming a sniper, however the success of Asking Alexandria's debut album Stand Up and Scream convinced him to continue a music career.

== Music career ==
=== 2008–2015, 2016–present: Asking Alexandria ===
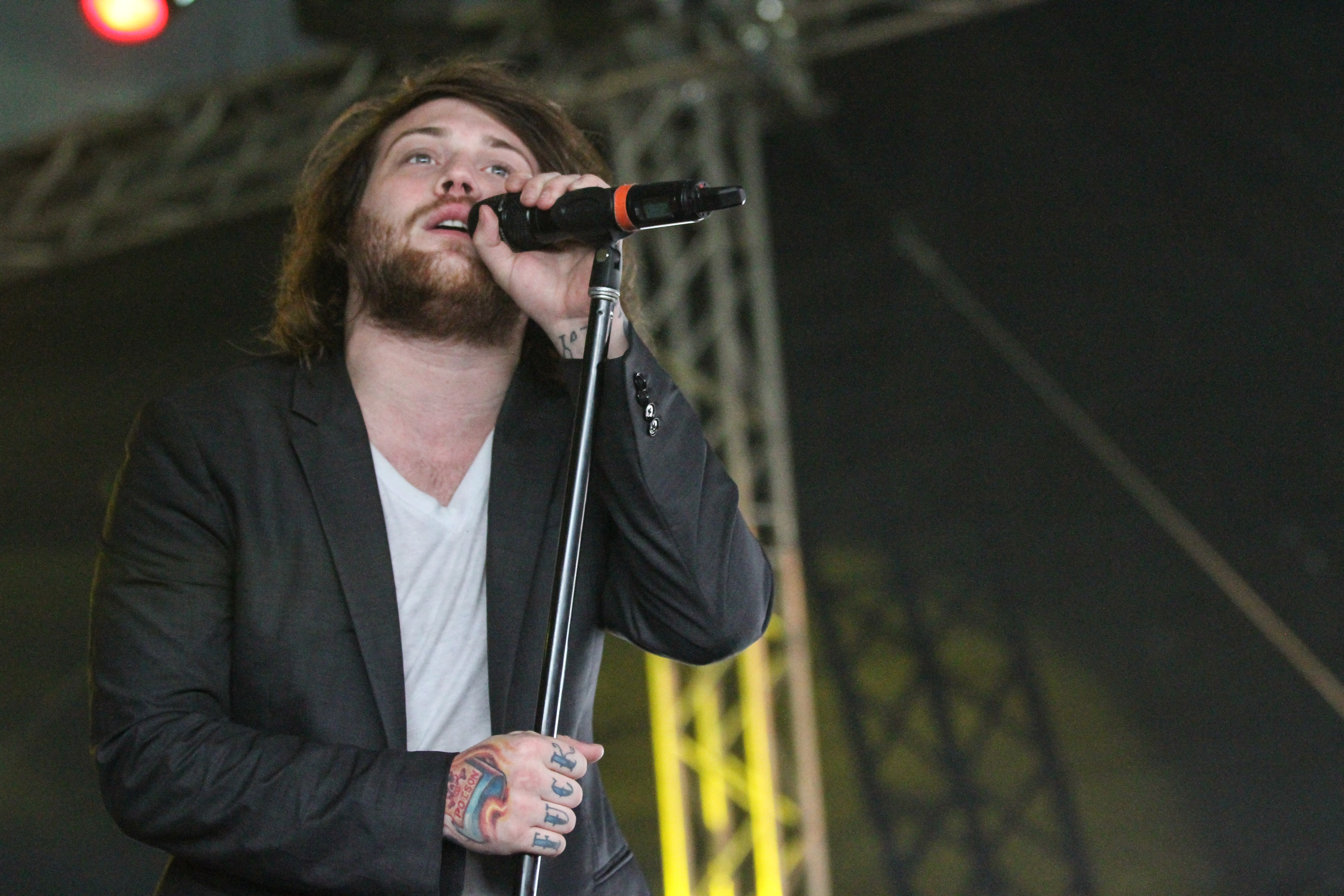
Worsnop with Asking Alexandria at With Full Force 2013

Although Ben Bruce originally formed the band in Dubai in 2006, after he realized that he wouldn't be able to achieve international success in Dubai, he moved to Nottingham in England in 2008 and reassembled the band with new members from the York area, including lead singer Danny Worsnop, Ben had moved in with Danny at his parents' home Gilberdyke. He carried the name over due to not wanting to bother to come up with a brand new name, so he stuck with the old one. When asked why he chose that particular name, he explained that "Most bands have a pretty shit band name, so I just came up with something. I came up with Alexandria as a human name, because people relate to humans", although the reason for using the word 'asking' is not explained.

The band released their first official debut album titled Stand Up and Scream in 2009 via Sumerian and Victory records, produced by Joey Sturgis. Although it did not chart in the UK, it did chart in the US, peaking at 4 in the Top Heatseekers, 24 in the Top Hard Rock Albums and 29 in the Top Independent Albums. The band's second album, titled Reckless and Relentless, was released in 2011 via Sumerian records, which again featured Joey Sturgis. This time, the album did chart in the UK, peaking at 7 on the UK Rock Chart, and also charted in Australia at 30 on the Australian Albums Chart. They released their third album, titled From Death to Destiny in 2013 via Sumerian Records and peaked in the US at 5 and the Top Hard Rock Albums at 1, and also charted in the UK at 28 and in Australia at 11, making it their most commercially successful album to date.

On 22 January 2015, Danny Worsnop announced on his departure from the band, stating that he wants what's best for the band hence his departure, and also to focus on his new band We Are Harlot, despite this departure the band will be touring and also recording a new album, despite no further announcements being made about his replacement. Fans reacted to news in distress as they believe he was essential to the band's sound, while others were not surprised by his career move, some going as far to say he performs better with his new band We Are Harlot than he does with Asking Alexandria.

Worsnop himself has explained that he loved being a part of Asking Alexandria but he no longer wanted to create heavy music, stating that even if We Are Harlot didn't exist, he would have left the band anyway. He further commented that he also grew apart from the rest of the band musically and had reached a point where he wanted to do different things, hence the change from a metal band to a hard rock band. While Ben Bruce has admitted that the band is happier without Worsnop, he continued to show support for Asking Alexandria after they released their first single, "I Won't Give In", featuring Denis Stoff as the main vocalist with a positive response on his social media. When Worsnop was asked if he would ever return to making metal music online he responded with "Not opposed to it, but nothing planned at this point in time."

On 21 October 2016, guitarist Ben Bruce confirmed that Worsnop had officially reunited with Asking Alexandria after around 18 months of his departure. The band parted ways with Stoff, citing sudden lack of communication.

=== 2011–present: We Are Harlot ===
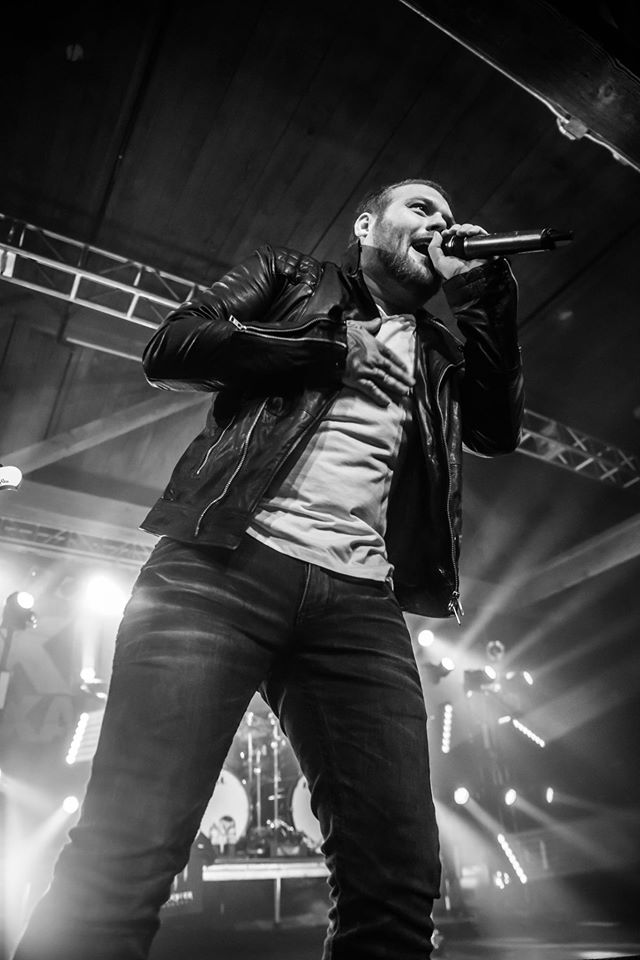
Worsnop with Asking Alexandria in 2016

In multiple interviews Danny Worsnop mentioned this band and referred to it as 'Harlot', which he has explained that after touring with Asking Alexandria in 2013, he would be touring with this band and release an album, along with his solo album in the near future. The band was formed three years prior to the events of 2014 after Worsnop and Jeff George formerly of Sebastian Bach, who shared the same lawyer Eric German, had met in Los Angeles on New Year's Eve, and within two days the pair bonded and moved in together as roommates at Worsnop's Beverley Hills home.

After discussing their musical endeavours, Worsnop invited Bruno Agra, formerly of Revolution Renaissance, and the three started to make demos based on Agra's former band. This was initially going to be used as material for Worsnop's solo album, but once they met Brian Weaver from Silvertide, who became part of the band after they advertised the role for a full-time bassist, it grew into the band. The band released their debut album on 30 March 2015. When asked if he preferred to perform with We Are Harlot or Asking Alexandria, Worsnop said that he disliked that question and that they are two opposites, with the statement "It's like comparing Aerosmith and Metallica."

The band's debut self-titled album was successfully released on 30 March and peaked in the US at 165 and in the UK at 58, it sold 5,000 copies in the US alone within its debut week and was well received by critics. The band recently stated that they will be releasing a second album in February 2017, and despite Worsnop's return to Asking Alexandria, they will not be sidelined in any way.

=== 2011–present: Solo project ===
Worsnop is to be releasing a solo album, however since announcement in 2011 he had only released a 50-second clip of the song Photograph via YouTube. In an interview with Artisan News Service Danny has said that he is expecting to release the album by Easter of 2014. In a Facebook post on 20 December 2013, he also stated that he is working with producer Jay Ruston, and that the album would be released through Sumerian Records, however this is not the case after his announcements in 2016.

In September 2015 in an interview with Altpress he stated that he was in the middle of recording his album, and that was doing so with country and blues music in mind, stating that he was a country boy when he grew up in England. He has also worked with songwriters Hillary Lindsey and John Paul White, and is also working with producer Jim Kaufman. He also stated that his solo project will include music videos and hopes it will be a success, however admitted that there are no plans to tour per se. In early December Worsnop officially announced that his debut solo album will in fact be released in 2016, and gave insight on the album's lyrical and musical influences, such as the fact that the album will include his past dealings with drugs, alcoholism, and his rehabilitation along with his other "dark demons".

He went on to say that he wrote the album intensely in a week and recorded the whole album live and raw in his Kaufman's living room, he also funded the project himself and oversaw every single aspect of the album's making, including its artwork of which he created and the music videos which he had written and directed himself, the album's recording officially ended in early February. Later the same month he released an album cover and the album's title, "The Prozac Sessions", and stated that he was in Nashville to find a label to release the album on. He also mentioned that there will be four variations of the album's artwork and possibly variations of bonus tracks to accommodate them. In early March Worsnop unveiled a series of song teasers and all four album covers on his website, and stated on his social media that he will be announcing debut live performances soon.

The first single released off of the album was "I Got Bones" in early April 2016, and was accompanied by a music video. The song itself is considered to be mostly country with blues mixed in, with Worsnop's vocals delivering some more powerful moments. Along with the single release the album itself became available for preorder.

On 26 September 2016, Worsnop announced through an Instagram post that the upcoming album will no longer be called The Prozac Sessions for legal reasons. The name was changed to The Long Road Home.

On 10 May 2019, Danny released his second solo album Shades of Blue through Sumerian Records with more music in the works for an upcoming 2020 album release, including new singles "Another You" and "Happy", which Danny says "a song I wrote about my never being content or satisfied. My constant need to do more and be better. The want to be able to slow down but the awareness that I never will."

== Other media ==
Worsnop has been stated to have written an autobiography titled "Am I Insane?", but it has never surfaced. An excerpt of it was released on 31 July 2013. According to the biography on his website, he is a photographer and that he will be releasing some of his works on charity auctions at some point in the future.

In February 2015 Worsnop made his first film acting debut as a guest star in a film created by Sumerian Records titled "What Now" written and directed by Ash Avildsen, owner of the record company. Later in the year it was also announced that he would have a role in the latest The Devil's Carnival film, Alleluia! The Devil's Carnival, stating that Darren Bousman, Terrance Zdunich and Sean DeMott invited him to the first film's premiere in Los Angeles, after which he was invited to be in its sequel, while he was excited he had to cancel since it initially clashed with tour times, however, after the tour was cancelled he asked to be involved again and was written into the film to play the part of the blacksmith-type character called "the Smith". After his involvement he went and got a manager and an agent and is looking for another project. He has also appeared in Average Joe, a comedy on YouTube, written and produced by Andy Biersack's cousin, Joe Flanders.

In August 2023, his first photobook Dark Horse was released, which included photos of Asking Alexandria recording and writing their seventh studio album See What's on the Inside at Dark Horse studios in Tennessee.

== Personal life ==
Worsnop has had a history of substance abuse and alcoholism, even appearing intoxicated during a 2011 performance by Asking Alexandria, which eventually led to Worsnop seeking help via drug rehabilitation. Snippets from the audio of the incident were included on the intro part of the song "Don't Pray for Me" from the band's third studio album From Death to Destiny, released in 2013. He dedicated the song "Room 138" to an incident where he claims he overdosed. The song is the closing track on the band's self-titled fifth album. According to Ben Bruce, Worsnop re-joined the band in 2016 "completely sober".

During his initial leaving of Asking Alexandria in January 2015, he fell into conflict with some of the other members, particularly Ben Bruce, who was said to be his "best friend". Their friendship rekindled in 2016, leading to his rejoining of Asking Alexandria.

From 2016 to 2017 Worsnop was in a relationship with a Nashville-based country singer Sarah Ross. He performed guest vocals on the song "All I Want To Know" from her Nervous Breakdown EP released in 2018.

On 12 January 2018, during a VIP meet and greet session before the show in Kansas City, Missouri, Worsnop met Victoria Potter, an active member of the United States Navy at the time; the two began dating later that month. On 5 August 2018, during a show in Columbus, Ohio, Worsnop proposed to Potter. In 2019, the pair were married. According to Clay County records, the couple divorced in November 2022.

== Discography ==
Danny Worsnop discography
- Studio albums: 10
- Extended plays: 2
- Live albums: 1
- Singles: 44
- Compilations: 1
- Collaborations: 15
- Remix: 1

=== As solo artist ===
==== Studio albums ====
Title	Details	Chart positions	
Title	Details	US Heat	US Indie
The Long Road Home	Released: 17 February 2017; Label: Earache; Formats: Digital, CD, vinyl	16	38
Shades of Blue	Released: 10 May 2019; Label: Sumerian; Formats: Digital, CD, vinyl	8	33

==== Singles ====
Title	Year	Album
"Out Without You"	2016	Non-album single
"Mexico"	2016	The Long Road Home
"I Got Bones"	2016	The Long Road Home
"Don't Overdrink It"	2017	The Long Road Home
"Sanctuary" / "I Don't Want to Die"	2017	Non-album single
"Angels"	2018	Non-album single
"Little Did I Know"	2018	Shades of Blue
"Best Bad Habit"	2019	Shades of Blue
"Another You"	2019	Non-album single
"Happy"	2020	Non-album single

==== As featured artist ====
Title	Year	Peak chart positions	Album
Title	Year	US Main.	Album
"Dark Thoughts" (The Funeral Portrait featuring Danny Worsnop)	2023	1	Greetings From Suffocate City
"Death Wish" (Royale Lynn featuring Danny Worsnop)	2024	27	Black Magic

==== Music videos ====
Title	Year	Album	Director
"Out Without You"	2016	Non-album single	Sam Link, Danny Worsnop
"I Got Bones"	2016	The Long Road Home	Mungo Creative Group
"Mexico"	2016	The Long Road Home	Unknown
"Don't Overdrink It"	2017	The Long Road Home	Blake Judd, Danny Worsnop
"High"	2017	The Long Road Home	Unknown
"Angels"	2018	Non-album single	Danny Worsnop
"Little Did I Know"	2019	Shades of Blue	Unknown
"Best Bad Habit"	2019	Shades of Blue	Aaron Berkshire
"Ain't Feeling Sorry"	2019	Shades of Blue	Jim Kaufman

==== Compilation contributions ====
Song	Year	Album
"Man in the Mirror" (Michael Jackson cover)	2013	Thriller: A Metal Tribute to Michael Jackson

==== Collaborations ====
Song	Year	Album	Artist
"Wake the Dead"	2010	With One Last Breath	With One Last Breath
"Automatic Rewind"	2010	Crossroads: 2010	Bizzy Bone
"Frequencies"	2011	Frequencies	Eyes Like Diamonds
"Endless Sky"	2012	Digital Renegade	I See Stars
"The Price of Beauty"	2012	Ending Is the Beginning: The Mitch Lucker Memorial Show	Suicide Silence
"Losing Sight"	2012	Challenger	Memphis May Fire
"Sellouts"	2014	Savages	Breathe Carolina
"Brother"	2014	Watch Me	Ronnie Radke
"Shining in the Dark"	2017	Rough Around the Edges	Jericho Rose
"Stare at the Sun"	2018	Violent Noise	The Word Alive
"Just Tell Me Something"	2018	Victim of the New Disease	All That Remains
"All I Want to Know"	2019	Nervous Breakdown	Sarah Ross
"Mother Lover (Mthr Lvr)"	2020	Mother Lover	Testarossa
"Criminal"	2020	Reflections	Paul Bartolome
"Broken as Me"	2021	Greatest Hits Vol. 2: The Better Noise Years	Papa Roach
"Remedy"	2021	Choke Artist	S.A.M.
"Lay the Warriors to Rest"	2021	Lay the Warriors to Rest	Mat Best
"Who's That Playing on the Radio?"	2022	Worst Behavior	Hyro the Hero
"Deal with the Devil"	2024	It's Rashad	Rvshvd
"Dark Thoughts"	2024	Greetings From Suffocate City	The Funeral Portrait
"Death Wish"	2024	Black Magic	Royale Lynn

=== As official member ===
The following is series of lists that include albums and singles released by bands when Danny Worsnop was an official band member.

==== Albums ====
Title	Year	Band	Type
Stand Up and Scream	2009	Asking Alexandria	Studio album
Life Gone Wild	2010	Asking Alexandria	EP
Stepped Up and Scratched	2011	Asking Alexandria	Remix album
Reckless & Relentless	2011	Asking Alexandria	Studio album
Under the Influence: A Tribute to the Legends of Hard Rock	2012	Asking Alexandria	EP
From Death to Destiny	2013	Asking Alexandria	Studio album
Live from Brixton and Beyond	2014	Asking Alexandria	Live album
We Are Harlot	2015	We Are Harlot	Studio album
Asking Alexandria	2017	Asking Alexandria	Studio album
Like a House on Fire	2020	Asking Alexandria	Studio album
See What's on the Inside	2021	Asking Alexandria	Studio album
Where Do We Go from Here?	2023	Asking Alexandria	Studio album

==== Singles ====
Song	Year	Band
"Final Episode (Let's Change the Channel)"	2009	Asking Alexandria
"A Prophecy"	2010	Asking Alexandria
"If You Can't Ride Two Horses at Once... You Should Get Out of the Circus"	2010	Asking Alexandria
"Not the American Average"	2010	Asking Alexandria
"Morte et Dabo"	2011	Asking Alexandria
"Breathless"	2011	Asking Alexandria
"Someone, Somewhere"	2011	Asking Alexandria
"Final Episode (Let's Change the Channel)" (Borgore remix)	2011	Asking Alexandria
"Closure"	2011	Asking Alexandria
"To the Stage"	2011	Asking Alexandria
"Another Bottle Down" (Tomba remix)	2011	Asking Alexandria
"A Lesson Never Learned" (Celldweller remix)	2011	Asking Alexandria
"Reckless & Relentless" (Document One remix)	2011	Asking Alexandria
"Reckless & Relentless"	2012	Asking Alexandria
"Run Free"	2012	Asking Alexandria
"The Death of Me"	2013	Asking Alexandria
"The Death of Me" (Rock mix)	2013	Asking Alexandria
"Killing You"	2013	Asking Alexandria
"Break Down the Walls"	2013	Asking Alexandria
"Denial"	2014	We Are Harlot
"Moving On"	2014	Asking Alexandria
"Someone, Somewhere" (Popkong remix)	2015	Asking Alexandria
"Dancing On Nails"	2015	We Are Harlot
"Into the Fire"	2017	Asking Alexandria
"Where Did It Go?"	2017	Asking Alexandria
"Alone in a Room"	2018	Asking Alexandria
"Vultures"	2018	Asking Alexandria
"The Violence"	2019	Asking Alexandria
"They Don't Want What We Want (And They Don't Care)"	2020	Asking Alexandria
"Antisocialist"	2020	Asking Alexandria
"Down to Hell"	2020	Asking Alexandria
"House on Fire"	2020	Asking Alexandria
"Alone Again"	2021	Asking Alexandria
"Never Gonna Learn"	2022	Asking Alexandria
"Faded Out"	2022	Asking Alexandria
"Dark Void"	2023	Asking Alexandria
"Psycho"	2023	Asking Alexandria
"Bad Blood"	2023	Asking Alexandria

== Filmography ==
Title	Year	Role
What Now	2015	Himself
Alleluia! The Devil's Carnival	2015	The Smith
