= Moving On (Asking Alexandria song) =

Single by Asking Alexandria

from the album From Death to Destiny
- Released: 29 July 2014
- Recorded: 2013
- Genre: Hard rock
- Length: 4:02
- Label: Sumerian
- Songwriter: Danny Worsnop

Asking Alexandria singles chronology
"Break Down the Walls" (2013)	"Moving On" (2014)	"Someone, Somewhere (Popkong remix)" (2015)

"Moving On" is a power ballad by English rock band Asking Alexandria. It was released on 29 July 2014, as the final single from the album From Death to Destiny.

== Background ==
In an interview with Blabbermouth.net, guitarist Ben Bruce commented on the video: "For the first time in our careers, we are showcasing ourselves in the most sincere light possible. No drugs, no partying, no script, and no bullshit. It's just the five of us completely vulnerable. No matter what the circumstance, being away from those you love and care about is very difficult and drags you down. Luckily for us, we have incredible fans that love and support us and help us through our toughest times. I hope this video gives you all a little bit of a look into our world. Thank you for all of your continued support and for keeping us going."

== Music video ==
The music video was released on 12 September 2014. It shows the band members touring. Between the shots of the tour, there are shots of the band members reuniting with relatives or showing messages, such as "I'll be home soon, I love you", "Thinking of you always", "Miss you so much" and shots of the band members smoking, drinking or even crying. The band's official coach bus is shown in the video in the shots when they are traveling on tour. Trivium frontman Matt Heafy, rapper and Body Count frontman Ice-T and his wife Coco Austin make an appearance in the video with them showing messages, "TeoTorriatte" and "I Miss NOBODY" respectively.

== Track listing ==
Digital 45

1. Moving On - 4:02
2. Moving On (acoustic) - 4:03

== Personnel ==
- Danny Worsnop – lead vocals, additional guitar
- Ben Bruce – lead guitar, backing vocals
- Cameron Liddell – rhythm guitar
- Sam Bettley – bass
- James Cassells – drums

== Charts ==
"Moving On" is one of the most successful Asking Alexandria songs on the charts, peaking at No. 6 at Billboard's Mainstream Rock Songs.

Chart (2014)	Peak position
US Mainstream Rock (Billboard)	6
US Hot Rock & Alternative Songs (Billboard)	44
US Rock Airplay (Billboard)	28

== Certifications ==
Region	Certification	Certified units/sales
United States (RIAA)	Gold	500,000^{‡}
^{‡} Sales+streaming figures based on certification alone.
