= We Are Harlot (album) =

Studio album by We Are Harlot
- Released: March 27, 2015
- Recorded: 2011–2014 at The Fortress and Steakhouse Studios (Los Angeles, California)
- Genre: Hard rock
- Length: 37:38
- Label: Roadrunner
- Producer: Kato Khandwala and Scott Stevens

Singles from We Are Harlot
- 1. "Denial" Released: May 14, 2014; 2. "Dancing On Nails" Released: January 20, 2015

We Are Harlot is the self-titled debut album by the American rock band We Are Harlot and was released on March 30, 2015 in the US. Two singles have been released, "Denial" and "Dancing On Nails," which peaked at 14 on the US Mainstream Rock chart. The album successfully charted the UK and US charts, peaking at 58 in the UK and 165 in the US. And their song "Denial" was the bumper song for WWE Raw.

== Background and recording ==
The band formed in 2011 when all four members had joined together and started recording demos for the album from then, one of them being the song Never Turn Back which was initially titled 'Rainmaker'. The album was initially going to be released in 2014, however was delayed to 2015 due to label changes that year. In an interview it was revealed that the album was being recorded in The Fortress in Downtown LA in 2014 and was being produced by Scott Stevens. The album was later produced by Kato Khandwala and was recorded at Steakhouse Studios in North Hollywood.

Jeff George has stated that when writing and recording the album the order which each track is built often starts with Bruno Agra laying down the foundation with his drums, then George providing guitars in its various layers, then allowing Brian Weaver to record his bass parts, leaving Danny Worsnop to sing lead vocals with the rest of the band adding in harmonies, leaving the guitar solos to be the last thing to be recorded. He quotes that when recording any We Are Harlot song, it "... is just a fast natural process."

== Style and composition ==
When Worsnop was asked about the lyrical theme of their debut album, he stated that "The whole album is basically about sex!", explaining that it was a challenge since there is "...very fine line between sexy and cheesy." and went on to say he was fuelled by his love and lust when he entered a new relationship. Worsnop quoted: “We knew that rock music needed a facelift fast and that real rock ‘n’ roll needed to be back front and center again! That's why we are here, to bring this music to a whole new generation of people that have been screaming out for what they deserve.” In an interview with Loudwire Worsnop stated that this album was important to his sense of fulfillment since he has finally created music that resembled the music he grew up with, such as Aerosmith and Rolling Stones, and when he was asked why he feels "real" rock music has gone away, he responded that he believes it is due to conformity, which resulted in many bands sounding the same since they all shared the same formula.

== Release and promotion ==
The band released their first single, 'Denial', on May 14, 2014. In early January 2015 the band issued a statement via Rocksound Magazine that they will be releasing their debut album in March that same year, and explained that the delay was caused not by their music, but due to a label change along with multiple legal issues regarding those labels. The band released their second song and single via BBC Radio 1 Rock Show with Daniel P. Carter on January 19, titled "Dancing On Nails". The band's first music video was released a day later further promoting the song, and also officially announced the debut album, made available to pre-order for March 31. The next video released was for the track "The One" and was released on February 17. On March 17, they released another track, titled "Never Turn Back" exclusively through Loudwire. They streamed the album online in full on March 23, a week prior to its official release, with Jeff George releasing the statement:

"We are so excited to finally be streaming our debut album in full to you. What you are listening to is a real, breathing, living thing created by four extremely diverse people from different parts of the globe, with different personalities and creative influences. When you put the four of us together, you get the sound that is We Are Harlot, a sound that shines through on the 11 tracks that lay before you. This one is for you: The Harlot Army and our friends and families around the world."

In promotion of the album the band have announced their first ever headline tour across the US including various music festivals including Welcome to Rockville, Carolina Rebellion, Rock On The Range, Rocklahoma and Rockfest. The tour will start on April 2 in Phoenix, Arizona and will end on April 30 at Kansas City's Rockfest. The band also intend to perform in the UK on three dates in June, the first of which is 2015's Download Festival, and later announced that they will be performing at Metal Hammer's Golden Gods award ceremony in the same month.

== Reception ==
=== Commercial performance ===
The album sold 5,000 copies in the US alone within its debut week. The album successfully charted in both the US and the UK; in the UK it peaked at 58 while in the US it peaked at 165. In other US charts the album successfully peaked at: 85 in Top Album Sales, 1 in Top Heatseekers, 6 in Top Hard Rock Albums and 28 in Top Rock Albums. In the UK the album also charted 4 on the Rock & Metal Albums Chart Top 40. The album's second single Dancing On Nails also successfully charted in the US Mainstream Rock chart peaking at 14 and the Top Rock Airplay chart peaking at 48. Kerrang! magazine has also nominated the album as 2015's best album release for the Kerrang! Awards.

=== Critical reception ===
Professional ratings
Review scores
Source	Rating
Big Cheese	9/10
Kerrang!	KKKKK
Metal Hammer	8/10
Rocksound	8/10 stars
Rolling Stone Australia	4/5 stars

Critical response to the album was very favourable upon release. AllMusic reviewer Timothy Monger praised its nod towards "...the Sunset Strip rock of the '80s..." while still maintaining a modern twist, comparing its efforts to that of Guns N' Roses and Mötley Crüe. Big Cheese's Kais Waring commended the album for being a complete difference to Worsnop's previous band Asking Alexandria, stating that the only similarity between the two is Worsnop's contribution, further commenting that the band is a "melodic and souldful" one yet they manage to maintain a classic 1980s rock 'n' roll vibe, stating that the gathered experience of all the members is a huge advantage, giving the album a much more professional finished sound in comparison to most other debut albums. Kerrang! magazine writer James McMahon gave the album a maximum five K's, stating that their songs resemble those of AC/DC, Meat Loaf and Queen, and praised Worsnop's new approach to music despite how different it is in comparison to his previous efforts with Asking Alexandria, and that even on McMahons least favourite song, The One, Jeff George's skills on the guitar makes it worth a listen, praising them above the latest efforts by Aerosmith and Van Halen.

Joe Daily of Metal Hammer noted that Worsnop, in comparison of his previous endeavours with Asking Alexandria, he sounds like he is having a lot more fun musically on this album than he has on any previous album he has been featured on, approving of the band's lyrical style orientating around sex, drugs and rock 'n' roll cliches reminiscent of the 1980s, comparing their efforts to Mötley Crüe and Bon Jovi, further admiring the albums "...full-throttle tempos and arena friendly choruses...' and its range of hard rock tracks, some being heavier and/or softer than some others.

Rock Sound reviewer Ryan Bird stated that the band's sound is a tribute to the days when rock music was more than about drinking and doing drugs, stating that songs like 'Dancing On Nails', 'Denial' and 'One More Night' are reminiscent of Mötley Crüe at their most rampant, while their mid-tempo songs like 'Easier to Leave' and 'Someday' convince Ryan Bird that the album could be genuinely huge. He applauds the passion and enthusiasm Danny Worsnop uses to drive his vocals while Jeff George shows how 'dazzling' the band are. Nick Ruskell from Rolling Stone Australia admitted that Worsnop appeared out of place when he was with his previous band Asking Alexandria, whereas this band he fits "...like a fingerless glove." He goes on to call the album an all greasy rock and roll album containing iconic riffs.

The album was included at number 10 on Rock Sound's top 50 releases of 2015 list.

== Track listing ==
All tracks written by Danny Worsnop, Jeff George and Bruno Agra.

No.	Title	Length
1.	"Dancing On Nails"	2:40
2.	"Dirty Little Thing"	3:10
3.	"Someday"	4:06
4.	"Denial"	4:08
5.	"Easier To Leave"	3:21
6.	"One More Night"	3:21
7.	"Never Turn Back"	3:31
8.	"The One"	3:23
9.	"Love For the Night"	2:58
10.	"Flying Too Close To the Sun"	3:20
11.	"I Tried"	3:40
Total length:		37:38

Japanese bonus track
No.	Title	Length
12.	"Find A Way"	4:09

== Personnel ==
We are Harlot

- Danny Worsnop – lead vocals, piano
- Jeff George – guitars, vocals
- Brian Weaver – bass guitar, vocals
- Bruno Agra – drums

Production

- Kato Khandwala, Scott Stevens – producers
- Kato Khandwala, Ken "KenDog" Eisennagel - engineers
- Kato Khandwala - mixing
- Ted Jensen – mastering
- Colin Cunningham – digital editing
- Travis Shin – photography
- Darren Dalessio, Dave Rath – A&R
- Eric German – legal team
- Bernie Gilhuly – business management
- Knupp LLP – legal team
- Sean Mosher-Smith – package design and layout
- Kristen Muldesig – management
- Jon Nicholson – drum tech
- Rick Sales – management
- Alex Santos – business management
- Mitchell Silberg – legal team

== Charts ==
=== Weekly charts ===
Chart (2014)	Peak position
UK Official Charts Company	58
UK Rock & Metal Albums Chart Top 40	4
US Top Album Sales	85
US Billboard Top 200	165
US Top Heatseekers	1
US Top Hard Rock Albums	6
US Top Rock Albums	28

=== Singles ===
Title	Year	Chart peak	
Title	Year	US Main.	US Rock Air.
"Dancing On Nails"	2015	13	45

== Release history ==
Region	Date	Format	Label	Catalog no.
Germany	March 27, 2015	CD, digital	Roadrunner	16861751524
UK	March 30, 2015	CD, digital	Roadrunner	0016861751524
United States	March 30, 2015	Digital	Roadrunner	016861751500
United States	March 31, 2015	CD	Roadrunner	1686175152
Japan	April 1, 2015	CD, digital	Warner Music Japan	WPCR-16357
