= Where Do We Go from Here? (Asking Alexandria album) =

Studio album by Asking Alexandria
- Released: 25 August 2023
- Genres: Melodic metalcore; post-hardcore; heavy metal; alternative metal
- Length: 39:28
- Label: Better Noise
- Producer: Matt Good

Asking Alexandria chronology
| See What's on the Inside (2021) | Where Do We Go from Here? (2023) |

Singles from Where Do We Go from Here?
- 1. "Dark Void" Released: 12 May 2023; 2. "Psycho" Released: 16 June 2023; 3. "Bad Blood" Released: 16 June 2023

Where Do We Go from Here? is the eighth studio album by English rock band Asking Alexandria. The album was released on 25 August 2023 through Better Noise Music and was produced by Matt Good. It is the last album to feature the band's founding lead guitarist Ben Bruce before he left the band in January 2024.

== Background and promotion ==
On 29 April 2023, Asking Alexandria released a video teaser for their new song "Dark Void", available on 12 May. On that day, the band officially unveiled the single and its corresponding music video. On 12 June, they revealed the album's title.

On 16 June, the band premiered two singles "Psycho" and "Bad Blood" along with an accompanying music video for "Psycho". On 7 July, they officially published the release date, album cover and track list. The music video for "Let Go" was released 25 August 2023, coinciding with the album release.

== Critical reception ==
Professional ratings
Review scores
| Source | Rating |
|---|---|
| Blabbermouth.net | 8/10 |
| Kerrang! | 4/5 stars |
| Metal Hammer | 3.5/5 stars |
| Metal.de | 7/10 |
| Wall of Sound | 6.5/10 |

The album received generally positive reviews from critics. Anne Erickson from Blabbermouth.net gave the album 8 out of 10 and said: "It's difficult to say where Where Do We Go from Here? fits in Asking Alexandria's discography, as it's one of the more dynamic records in their collection. The core of the album is still melodic metalcore, but it's certainly one of their heavier offerings, hinting at a heavier direction for the band." Kerrang! gave the album 4 out of 5 and stated: " As usual, this album isn't entirely what fans will be expecting, and also as usual, it'll be more than worth the time for each and every one of them."

Metal Hammer gave the album a positive review and stated: "Asking Alexandria stress that they worked hard to incorporate parts of many prior albums here, and in doing so they've produced some chart-worthy anthemic stadium rock songs. Where Do We Go From Here? also achieves something fans have craved for a long time: glimpses of the heaviness that made this inherently emotional band so beloved in the first place, albeit doused with some hefty doses of modern electronic influences." Wall of Sound scored the album 6.5/10 and wrote: "Asking Alexandria's musical evolution continues on Where Do We Go from Here?. They have embraced both their past and present musical inclinations, showcasing a band maturing while reembracing some of their core roots. Will the 'core' parts be enough to re-engage lost fans? While I personally would only add a few of the tracks to my playlists, that's more than I would have from the last two albums."

== Track listing ==
Where Do We Go from Here? track listing
| No. | Title | Length |
|---|---|---|
| 1. | "Bad Blood" | 3:30 |
| 2. | "Things Could Be Different" | 3:35 |
| 3. | "Let Go" | 4:13 |
| 4. | "Psycho" | 3:56 |
| 5. | "Dark Void" | 3:52 |
| 6. | "Nothing Left" | 4:27 |
| 7. | "Feel" | 3:32 |
| 8. | "Let the Dead Take Me" | 3:44 |
| 9. | "Kill It with Fire" | 1:06 |
| 10. | "Holding on to Something More" | 3:24 |
| 11. | "Where Do We Go from Here?" | 4:09 |
| Total length: | | 39:28 |

== Personnel ==
Asking Alexandria

- Danny Worsnop – lead vocals, additional guitar
- Ben Bruce – lead guitar, backing vocals
- Cameron Liddell – rhythm guitar
- Sam Bettley – bass
- James Cassells – drums

Additional personnel

- Matt Good – production, mixing
- Howie Weinberg and Will Borza – mastering

== Charts ==
Chart performance for Where Do We Go from Here?
| Chart (2023) | Peak position |
|---|---|
| German Albums (Offizielle Top 100) | 79 |
| UK Album Downloads (Official Charts) | 26 |
| UK Independent Albums (Official Charts) | 17 |
| UK Rock & Metal Albums (Official Charts) | 5 |
| US Top Album Sales (Billboard) | 87 |
