= Purgation (album) =

Studio album by Trigger the Bloodshed
- Released: 18 February 2008 (UK); 19 August 2008 (US); 22 August 2008 (EU)
- Recorded: August–September 2007
- Genres: Technical death metal, deathcore
- Length: 36:52
- Labels: Rising (UK); Metal Blade (worldwide)
- Producer: Mark Daghorn

Trigger the Bloodshed chronology
Purgation (2008)	The Great Depression (2009)

Professional ratings
Review scores
Source	Rating
AllMusic	3.5/5 stars
Exclaim!	(favorable)

Purgation is the debut album of the British death metal band Trigger the Bloodshed. It was released on 18 February 2008 by Rising Records and in August 2008 by Metal Blade Records.

== Background and reception ==
Purgation was recorded from August to September 2007, produced by Mark Daghorn and mixed by Karl Groom and released by Rising Records in February 2008. The band gained praise from the English press, in particular Kerrang!, Terrorizer and Metal Hammer and signed to Metal Blade Records. Purgation was subsequently re-released by Metal Blade in U.S., Canada, Australia and Japan.

== Track listing ==
All music is composed by Robert Purnell.

No.	Title	Length
1.	"Inception"	0:17
2.	"Merciless Ignorance"	1:46
3.	"Laceration"	3:12
4.	"Rebirth"	1:23
5.	"The Defiled"	2:55
6.	"Severed"	2:08
7.	"Impregnable Miscreation"	3:41
8.	"Hollow"	1:17
9.	"Lovers"	3:24
10.	"Mortuary Walls"	2:26
11.	"Violent Elucidation"	1:10
12.	"A Wretched Betrayal"	1:00
13.	"Retribution"	3:10
14.	"The Abortive Becoming"	1:37
15.	"Domicile"	1:21
16.	"Whited Sepulcher"	2:22
17.	"A Perfect Casket"	3:43
Total length:		36:52

== Personnel ==
Trigger the Bloodshed

- Charlie Holmes – vocals
- Rob Purnell – lead guitar, backing vocals
- Martyn Evans – rhythm guitar
- Jamie O'Rourke – bass
- Max Blunos – drums

Production

- Mark Daghorn – production, engineering
- Karl Groom – mixing
- David Aston – mastering
