= With One Last Breath =

British metalcore band

- Origin: York, England
- Genres: Post-hardcore, metalcore
- Years active: 2008–present
- Label: Small Town
- Members: Sam Graves; Alex Scott; Chris Bowling; Spencer Costello
- Past members: Joe Lancaster; Jake Holmes; Joe Graves

With One Last Breath are an English post-hardcore band from York, England.

== History ==
=== Formation, self-titled EP and single (2008–2012) ===
The band was formed in 2008 with original members Sam Graves, Joe Graves, Chris Bowling and Jake Holmes. In 2010, they released their first EP of the same name. The EP included guest vocals from Danny Worsnop of Asking Alexandria and Davey Richmond of Glamour of the Kill, but sometime after the release, bassist Jake Holmes left the band and was replaced by Joe Lancaster (formerly of Asking Alexandria). Also in 2011, The band recruited Spencer Costello as their new lead singer. The band released a series of independent singles including Hell We Create, Forgive Never Forget and After the Suffering which was accompanied with a music video.

=== Record deal, Spencers departure and The Fearless Ones (2013–present) ===
In early 2013, it was announced that Spencer Costello had parted ways with the band, and due to this Sam Graves who was previously the guitarist and the initial frontman of the band, became the main vocalist once again, with Alex Scott taking his place on guitar. The band released their second EP in 2013 along with a music video for 'Until The End'. In January 2014, it was announced that the band had been working on their debut album titled The Fearless Ones and was set to be released on 14 April the same year. The announcement was followed with a release of a single of the same name from the record. On 3 March 2014, the band released preorders for the album on iTunes, which included the playlist and a new song was included with the preorder, "Broken". On the album, there will be rerecordings of four old songs: "Hell We Create", "Forgive, Never Forget", "After the Suffering", and "Wake It Up". On 29 March, the band announced that Joe Graves had left the band to pursue a career in musical engineering, however this has not hindered the bands progress in releasing the album and has not disrupted their touring.

== Musical style ==
Allschools describes the band's musical style as a mix of Bullet for My Valentine and Asking Alexandria. On highwiredaze.com, critic Kenneth Morton named heavy metal as an influence in the group's musical style. He described the song "I'm Taking Over (Thanks to You)" as a hybrid of In Flames and A Skylit Drive.

== Band members ==
Current

- Sam Graves – lead vocals (2008–2010, 2013–present), bass guitar (2014-present), rhythm guitar (2008–2013), backing vocals (2010–2013)
- Alex Scott – guitars (2013–present)
- Chris Bowling – drums (2008–present)
- Spencer Costello – lead vocals (2010-2013, 2015–present)

Past

- Joe Lancaster – bass (2010–2014)
- Jake Holmes – bass (2008–2010)

(2010–2013)

- Joe Graves – lead guitar, backing vocals (2008–2014)

Timeline

== Discography ==
With One Last Breath discography
- Studio albums: 1
- EPs: 2
- Singles: 6
- Music videos: 2

=== Studio albums ===
Name	Details
The Fearless Ones	Released: 14 April 2014; Label: Small Town Records; Format: CD, download

=== EPs ===
Name	Details
With One Last Breath	Released: 1 July 2010; Label: Self-released; Format: Download
Wake the Dead	Released: 25 February 2013; Label: Small Town Records; Format: CD, download

=== Singles ===
Song	Year	Album
"Hell We Create"	2011	Non-album single
"Forgive Never Forget"	2011	Non-album single
"After the Suffering"	2011	Non-album single
"Wake It Up"	2012	Non-album single
"The Fearless Ones"	2014	The Fearless Ones
"Broken"	2014	The Fearless Ones

=== Music videos ===
Song	Year	Album	Director	Type	Link
After the Suffering	2011	Non-album single	Unknown	Narrative	
Until the End	2013	Wake the Dead EP	Unknown	Performance	
