= The Great Depression (Trigger the Bloodshed album) =

Studio album by Trigger the Bloodshed
- Released: 14 April 2009
- Genre: Technical death metal
- Length: 34:07
- Label: Rising; Metal Blade
- Producer: Trigger the Bloodshed

Trigger the Bloodshed chronology
Purgation (2008)	The Great Depression (2009)	Degenerate (2010)

Professional ratings
Review scores
Source	Rating
AllMusic	3.5/5 stars
Blabbermouth.net	6/10 stars

The Great Depression is the second album of the British band Trigger the Bloodshed. It was released on 14 April 2009. The album was self-produced by the band and mixed by Karl Groom. A music video was released for the title track.

== Track listing ==
All lyrics are written by Jonny Burgan; all music is composed by Robert Purnell

No.	Title	Length
1.	"The Great Depression"	2:57
2.	"Warbound"	3:56
3.	"Sanctuary of the Wretched"	2:36
4.	"The Scourging Impurity"	3:55
5.	"The Dead World"	3:43
6.	"I"	1:10
7.	"Contemporary Perception Narcotics"	2:41
8.	"Desiccate Earth"	3:20
9.	"The Infliction of Tophet"	4:13
10.	"Disfigured Anonymity"	2:46
11.	"Terminus"	2:50
Total length:		34:07

== Personnel ==
Trigger the Bloodshed

- Jonny Burgan – vocals
- Rob Purnell – lead guitar, backing vocals
- Martyn Evans – rhythm guitar
- Dave Purnell – bass
- Max Blunos – drums

Production

- Trigger the Bloodshed – production; at Red House Farm and Cherry Wood studios
- Karl Groom – mixing; at Thin Ice Studios
- Dave – mastering; at The Digital Audio Company
