= Dancing on Nails =

"Dancing On Nails"

Single by We Are Harlot

from the album We Are Harlot
- Released: January 20, 2015
- Genre: Hard rock
- Length: 2:49
- Label: Roadrunner
- Songwriter(s): Jeff George, Bruno Agra, Danny Worsnop
- Producer(s): Kato Khandwala

We Are Harlot singles chronology
"Denial" (2014)	"Dancing On Nails" (2015)	"Someday" (2015)

Music video
- "Dancing On Nails" on YouTube

"Dancing On Nails" is the second single released by the American rock band We Are Harlot from their self-titled debut album.

== Release ==
The song was initially released via the BBC Radio 1 Rock Show with Daniel P. Carter on January 19' 2015. The single was officially released when the band announced the release date of their debut album on January 20 and was also accompanied by the band's first music video. It also serves as the album's opening track, and along with the rest of the album, it was produced by Kato Khandwala at Steakhouse Studios in North Hollywood.

== Reception ==
The song was called a "...high-energy radio-rock with a taste for ‘80s flash..." by Altpress writer Matt Crane and stated that the music video promoting the song "feels like a night out in Vegas—at one of the cheap casinos". Crane also believes that as a result of Worsnop's vocal strain from performing with his former band Asking Alexandria it has enabled him to sing with more raspier 'rock' vocals.

== Track list ==
No.	Title	Length
1.	"Dancing On Nails"	2:49

== Chart performance ==
Chart	Peak Position
US Mainstream Rock (Billboard)	13
US Rock Airplay (Billboard)	45
