= Final Episode (Let's Change the Channel) =

Single by Asking Alexandria

from the album Stand Up and Scream
- Released: 15 December 2009
- Studio: Foundation Recording (Connersville, Indiana)
- Genre: Metalcore
- Length: 4:02
- Label: Sumerian
- Songwriters: Danny Worsnop; Ben Bruce; James Cassells
- Producer: Joey Sturgis

Asking Alexandria singles chronology
| "Final Episode (Let's Change the Channel)" (2009) | "If You Can't Ride Two Horses at Once... You Should Get Out of the Circus" (2009) |

"Final Episode (Let's Change the Channel)" is a song by English rock band Asking Alexandria. It is the band's lead single from their debut album, Stand Up and Scream. It was released on 15 December 2009. One of the band's most successful songs, the single was certified gold by the RIAA in March 2014.

== Music video ==
The music video, directed by Robby Starbuck, shows the band playing in a room. Also shown is a table, on which stands a cup of tea. Throughout the video, the cup gradually shifts to the edge of the table and finally falls down and breaks in the end.

== Track listing ==
| No. | Title | Length |
|---|---|---|
| 1. | "Final Episode (Let's Change the Channel)" | 4:02 |
| Total length: | | 4:02 |

== Personnel ==
- Danny Worsnop – lead vocals, keyboards, programming
- Ben Bruce – lead guitar, backing vocals, keyboards, programming
- Cameron Liddell – rhythm guitar
- Sam Bettley – bass
- James Cassells – drums

== Certifications ==
| Region | Certification | Certified units/sales |
|---|---|---|
| United States (RIAA) | Gold | 500,000^{*} |
^{*} Sales figures based on certification alone.
