= Trigger the Bloodshed =

British death metal band

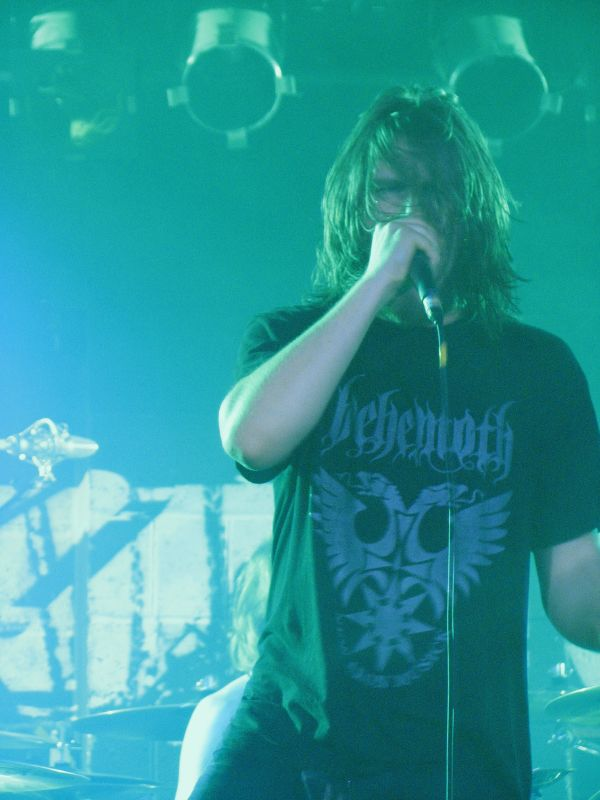
- Performing in 2008

Background information
- Origin: Bath/Bristol, United Kingdom
- Genres: Technical death metal, deathcore (early)
- Years active: 2006–2012
- Labels: Metal Blade, Candlelight, Rising
- Members: Jonny Burgan; Rob Purnell; Dave Purnell; Dan Wilding
- Past members: Martyn Evans; Charlie Holmes; Jamie O'Rourke; Max Blunos

Trigger the Bloodshed were a British death metal band from Bath, England, formed in 2006. The band comprised guitarist Rob Purnell, vocalist Jonny Burgan, bassist Dave Purnell and drummer Dan Wilding. Trigger the Bloodshed has released three studio albums and toured in Europe with Suffocation, Cannibal Corpse, Meshuggah among others.

The band was critically acclaimed by the press, including Kerrang!, Terrorizer and Metal Hammer magazines, for their extreme and technical form of death metal music.

== History ==
Trigger the Bloodshed was founded in Bath, United Kingdom during September 2006 by guitarists Rob Purnell and Martyn Evans. In 2007, the band was joined by the vocalist Charlie Holmes, bassist Jamie O'Rourke and drummer Max Blunos; and signed to Rising Records after paying the label a large fee. The debut album, Purgation, was released in early 2008 and the band gained praise from the English press, in particular Kerrang!, Terrorizer and Metal Hammer magazines. Around the time of this album the band would usually buy their way onto big tours or shows, leading to larger exposure. In June, Trigger the Bloodshed played at the Download Festival. Holmes and O'Rourke departed and were replaced by a new vocalist Jonny Burgan and bassist Dave Purnell, younger brother of Rob Purnell. Holmes went on to form a new, melodic hardcore band, Heart in Hand.

Trigger the Bloodshed signed to Metal Blade Records in July 2008 and Purgation was released in U.S., Canada, Australia and Japan. The band supported Suffocation, Meshuggah and Cryptopsy on tour from mid- to late 2008, performed at the Download Festival and began work on their second album, The Great Depression. After the release in April 2009, the band supported Cannibal Corpse and Dying Fetus on a tour. In July 2009, Blunos departed from the band.

Trigger the Bloodshed were contacted by drummer Daniel Wilding, formerly of the Belgium-based Aborted, who joined the band later on. The band's third album, entitled Degenerate, was recorded in early 2010. Following the May 2010 release, the band embarked on a headlining European Degenerate tour and appeared at the 2010 Download Festival, alongside A Day to Remember and Bullet for my Valentine. In November, the band supported Job for a Cowboy on a tour in Europe. The Kingdom Come EP was released independently in October 2011.

== Musical style and critical reception ==
Kerrang! stated that Trigger the Bloodshed "always displayed a genuine knack for mixing sheer brutality with technically impressive musicianship." According to Blabbermouth.net, "Trigger the Bloodshed has been creating some of the most extreme music in death metal, forging the new with the old school. Their blistering blast filled death metal is a devastating aural assault earning them the title of the U.K.'s heaviest band." Terrorizer magazine has stated: "Trigger The Bloodshed are a little too rich in content and conviction to enable the purist's objections to ever ring true, and even on their Purgation debut, the Bath crew were exhibiting a rare flair for channeling old school intensity through the invigorated rhythmic and structural language of the new breed."

The band blends a range of death metal, tech death and deathcore elements together for their musical style.

== Band members ==
Final lineup

- Rob Purnell – guitar, vocals (2006–2012)
- Dave Purnell – bass (2008–2012)
- Jonny Burgan – vocals (2008–2012)
- Dan Wilding – drums (2009–2012)

Former

- Jay – bass (2006–2007)
- Martyn Evans – guitar (2006–2011)
- Jamie O'Rourke – bass (2007–2008)
- Max Blunos – drums (2007–2009)
- Charlie Holmes – vocals (2007–2008)

Timeline

== Discography ==
Studio albums

- Purgation (2008)
- The Great Depression (2009)
- Degenerate (2010)

Extended plays

- Kingdom Come EP (2011)
