= Degenerate (album) =

Studio album by Trigger the Bloodshed
- Released: 24 May 2010
- Genre: Technical death metal
- Length: 36:02
- Labels: Metal Blade Records (EU); Rising Records (UK); Candlelight Records (US)
- Producers: Trigger the Bloodshed; Mark Daghorn

Trigger the Bloodshed chronology
The Great Depression (2009)	Degenerate (2010)	Kingdom Come (2011)

Degenerate is the third studio album by British death metal band Trigger the Bloodshed, released on 24 May 2010. It is the band's first album to feature Dan Wilding on drums; it was produced by Trigger the Bloodshed with Mark Daghorn, mixed and mastered by Jacob Hansen.

== Background ==
Degenerate was recorded in early 2010, self-produced by the band with Mark Daghorn, mixed and mastered by the Danish producer Jacob Hansen. It was the band's first album that introduced drummer Daniel Wilding, formerly from the Belgium-based band Aborted. Degenerate was also released in a six-panel digipack complete with a re-recorded bonus track of "Whited Sepulcher" from the band's debut album. A music video directed by Dave Kenny was released for the song "The Soulful Dead".

== Reception ==
Professional ratings
Review scores
Source	Rating
AllMusic	3.5/5 stars
Kerrang!	4/5 stars
Rock Sound	8/10 stars
Terrorizer	8.5/10 stars

Degenerate received widespread critical acclaim from critics.

Rock Sound stated: "The record produces a hectic attack on the senses through the obvious avenues of rapid drums and hyperactive guitars and, though expected, produces immensely impressive results."

Terrorizer commented the album: "Opening with the lurch 'n' smash grooves of 'A Vision Showing Nothing' (...)", "Still firmly in the hyper brutal camp of Aeon and Hate Eternal, the Trigger sound rarely relents, but a new found sense of melodic inciseiveness has its hands on the steering wheel throughout the dynamic but dense likes of Hollow Prophecy, A Sterile Existence and wickedly bleak closing track Until Kingdom Come" and stated about the album: "Another impressive show of enhanced strength and maturity", (...) "Forceful, confident, and defiantly extreme, Degenerate is exactly what British death metal needs."

== Track listing ==
All lyrics are written by Jonny Burgan; all music is composed by Robert Purnell and Dave Purnell.

No.	Title	Length
1.	"A Vision Showing Nothing"	5:03
2.	"De-Breed"	4:19
3.	"Hollow Prophecy"	3:31
4.	"Dead Vein"	3:55
5.	"Dethrone"	4:01
6.	"A Sterile Existence"	4:43
7.	"The Soulful Dead"	4:02
8.	"Until Kingdom Come"	4:07
9.	"Whited Sepulcher" (Bonus Track)	2:24
Total length:		36:02

== Personnel ==
Trigger the Bloodshed

- Jonny Burgan – vocals
- Rob Purnell – lead guitar, backing vocals
- Martyn Evans – rhythm guitar
- Dave Purnell – bass
- Daniel Wilding – drums

Production

- Mark Daghorn and Trigger the Bloodshed – production at Little Clacton and Cherry Wood Studios
- Jacob Hansen – mixing and mastering at Hansen Studios
- Collin Marks – artwork
- Martyn Evans – layout
