= We Are Harlot =

British hard rock band

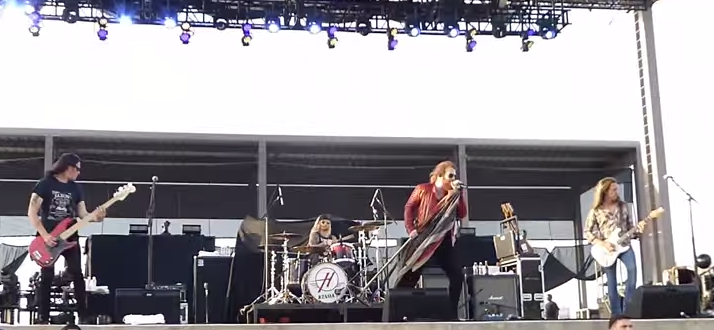
- We Are Harlot performing live in 2015. From left to right: Brian Weaver, Bruno Agra, Danny Worsnop and Jeff George.

Background information
- Also known as: Harlot
- Origin: Los Angeles, California, U.S.
- Genre: Hard rock
- Years active: 2011–2017 (hiatus)
- Label: Roadrunner
- Members: Danny Worsnop; Jeff George; Brian Weaver
- Past members: Bruno Agra

We Are Harlot, often shortened to just Harlot, is a hard rock supergroup organized by singer Danny Worsnop, of Asking Alexandria, and guitarist Jeff George, who was formerly Eminem's and Sebastian Bach's guitarist. The lineup also includes bassist Brian Weaver from Silvertide and drummer Bruno Agra formerly of Revolution Renaissance. Formed in 2011, they released their first single titled "Denial" in 2014 and released their self-titled debut album in 2015, which debuted on both the US and UK charts, as well as many other countries and sold over 15,000 copies in the US in its first week.

== History ==
=== 2010–2013: Formation ===
In multiple interviews Danny Worsnop mentioned this band and referred to it as 'Harlot', which he has explained that after touring with Asking Alexandria in 2013, he would be touring with this band and release an album, along with his solo album in the near future. The band was formed 3 years prior to the events of 2014 after Worsnop and Jeff George whom was playing guitar for Sebastian Bach, who shared the same lawyer Eric German, had met in Los Angeles on New Year's Eve of 2010, and within two days the pair bonded and moved in together as roommates at Worsnop's Beverly Hills home.

After discussing their musical endeavours Worsnop invited Bruno Agra, formerly of Revolution Renaissance, and the three started to make demos based on Agra's former band. This was initially going to be used as material for Worsnop's solo album, but once they met Brian Weaver from Silvertide, who became part of the band after they advertised the role for a full-time bassist, it grew into the band. Before the band's first live show announcement the band was considered to be a side project due to Worsnop's commitment to Asking Alexandria, of which he was the full-time lead singer at the time and expressed that he couldn't have spent as much time with this project as he wanted to.

=== 2014–2015: Signing to Atlantic Records/Roadrunner and self-titled album ===
The band was announced as one of the acts of the annual rock festival Rock on the Range off 2014 under the name "We Are Harlot", making this their first time they ever performed together in front of a live audience of over 40,000 people. During this time the band announced that their album will be released in the summer the same year. The band was initially named as simply 'Harlot' but Jeff George explains that due to copyright and legal issues, they remodelled as 'We Are Harlot'. It was later revealed by the band that they would release their first single off their album on May 14 titled "Denial". On signing to Roadrunner Records, the band said that:

"...Roadrunner has been there championing us from the beginning. When it came time to sign a deal all the labels came calling, but only one got the call back. Roadrunner Records' foundations were built on great rock 'n' roll bands, bands that we love, and we are here to continue carrying that torch and shaking those foundations."

The band's logo

After the band performed at Rock on the Range, they later played at various different festivals and tours, including; Rocklahoma in May, replacing the metal group Trivium due to the singer damaging his voice, they were the support act for The Pretty Reckless on May 28 at the Hard Rock Hotel and Casino in Las Vegas, performed "Denial" as new bumper music at WWE Raw on August 18, and also performed at 2014's Aftershock festival in September.

In early January 2015 the band issued a statement via Rocksound Magazine that they will be releasing their debut album in March that same year. The band officially announced their self-titled debut album in January after releasing their second single, "Dancing on Nails", and made it available to pre-order for March 30 in the US. Worsnop also announced his departure from Asking Alexandria, stating that he wanted to focus on this band more and also felt that Asking Alexandria would do better without him, also admitting that he no longer wanted to create heavy music anymore. The album was successfully released and peaked in the US at 165 and in the UK at 58. The album also sold 15,000 copies in the US alone within its debut week with the band reaching #1 on the Billboard Charts.

The band was announced to perform at South Florida's 'Fort Rock' festival and North Florida's 'Rockville' festival in April 2015, and was set to perform at Rock on the Range for the second time along with a new festival named 'Northern Invasion' based in Somerset, both of which took place in May. They also performed at both Download Festival, which served as their debut performance in the UK, and at Sonisphere Festival in Milan, Italy, which served as their debut performance in Italy in June.

=== 2016–present: Upcoming second album ===
In 2016 the band performed at Shiprocked on January 25 along with other bands such as Halestorm and Hellyeah, the band also performed at the Rock USA Festival on July 16. In October, along with Worsnop re-joining his former band Asking Alexandria, the band teased new music by releasing a snippet of a song titled 'Holding On Is Worse', and also made a public comment on social media that despite Worsnop making a return to his former act, the band will not be sidelined in any way, and that a new album would be released in February 2017. While the album was not released during that month, Worsnop confirmed in March that he has been working on the record and will be getting the band in the studio during summer the same year. In an interview, Worsnop has stated that the band's second album has been delayed indefinitely until the band's members are back on speaking terms, choosing to focus his energy on solo material and Asking Alexandria in the interim. As of mid-2023, there is no evidence the band will release a second album nor play live as a band again.

== Musical style and influences ==
From a live review based at their performance in Hard Rock Hotel in Las Vegas, it was stated that they had a "...real rock attitude, from a real rock band." and complimented on Worsnop's vocal performance as he uses a mixture of hardcore growls and melodic vocals, Georges laid down classic and well-defined solos and called Weaver and Agras performances warm, stable, and uncompromising, overall calling the band a modern rock and roll act. Worsnop and George have also expressed that while they do intend to introduce 80's style rock music to new generations, they also imply that they are not "...reinventing the wheel. Just pushing it forward." and compare their efforts to resurrect the genre with the likes of Halestorm, Rival Sons and the recent efforts of Black Veil Brides. Rocksound magazine reported that the band sounds like the "offspring" of Mötley Crüe and Skid Row with influences from Airbourne and Heaven's Basement.

In multiple interviews, the band has stated that they intend to be a rock and roll band, referring the likes of Aerosmith and Van Halen as their main inspirations and frequently states their intention to bring rock 'n' roll to a new generation. Once they released their self-titled debut album reviews compared them to hard rock acts such as AC/DC, Aerosmith, Meat Loaf, Queen and Van Halen, once compared to metal act Mötley Crüe. All reviews praised Worsnop's new vocal technique suited for the rock and roll theme along with Jeff George's skills on the guitar, and gained overall positive critical acclaim for their range in sound and a revival of 80's rock and hard rock.

=== Lyrical style ===
When Worsnop was asked about the lyrical theme of their debut album, he stated that "The whole album is basically about sex!", explaining that it was a challenge since there is "...very fine line between sexy and cheesy." and went on to say he was fuelled by his love and lust when he entered a new relationship. The band has also declared that they wanted to be happy and joyful with their music as a lot of rock music now is often focused around sadness, George himself explains that if you're going to play rock music "You should be bouncing off the walls!"

== Members ==
- Danny Worsnop – lead vocals, piano (2011–present)
- Jeff George – guitars, backing vocals (2011–present)
- Brian Weaver – bass guitar, backing vocals (2011–present)

Former members

- Bruno Agra – drums, backing vocals (2011–2020)

== Discography ==
We Are Harlot discography
- Studio albums: 1
- Singles: 3
- Music videos: 2

=== Studio albums ===
Title	Details	Peak Chart Positions		Sales
Title	Details	US	UK	Sales
We Are Harlot	Released: March 27, 2015; Label: Roadrunner Records; Formats: CD, digital download	165	58	US: 5,000 in the first week

=== Singles ===
Title	Year	Chart peaks	Album
Title	Year	US Main.	Album
"Denial"	2014	—	We Are Harlot
"Dancing on Nails"	2015	10	We Are Harlot
"Never Turn Back"	2015	—	We Are Harlot

==== Other charted tracks ====
Title	Year	Chart peaks	Album
Title	Year	US Main.	Album
"Someday"	2015	23	We Are Harlot

=== Music videos ===
Title	Year	Album	Director
"Dancing on Nails"	2015	We Are Harlot	Unknown
"The One"	2015	We Are Harlot	Unknown

== Accolades ==
Nominated work	Year	Award	Result	ref
We Are Harlot	2015	Metal Hammer Golden Gods Awards – Best New Band	Won	
We Are Harlot	2015	Kerrang! Awards – Best Album	Nominated	
We Are Harlot	2015	Classic Rock's Roll Of Honour Awards – Best New Band	Won	
