= From Death to Destiny =

Studio album by Asking Alexandria
- Released: 6 August 2013
- Studio: Various Studios
- Genres: Metalcore; hard rock; post-hardcore
- Length: 50:33
- Label: Sumerian
- Producer: Joey Sturgis

Asking Alexandria chronology
Under the Influence: A Tribute to the Legends of Hard Rock (2012)	From Death to Destiny (2013)	The Black (2016)

Singles from From Death to Destiny
- 1. "Run Free" Released: 13 August 2012; 2. "The Death of Me" Released: 28 March 2013; 3. "The Death of Me (Rock Mix)" Released: 16 April 2013; 4. "Killing You" Released: 16 July 2013; 5. "Break Down the Walls" Released: 21 October 2013; 6. "Moving On" Released: 29 July 2014

From Death to Destiny is the third studio album by English rock band Asking Alexandria. It was released on 6 August 2013 through Sumerian Records and was produced by Joey Sturgis. The band released the first single titled "Run Free" on 13 August 2012. The second single titled "The Death of Me", and a third track "Killing You", were released in March 2013.

This is the band's last album until their self-titled fifth album to feature the full original line-up, as vocalist Danny Worsnop left the band from January 2015 to October 2016.

== Background and recording ==
=== Production ===
The album was recorded in seven different studios.

- Foundation in Connersville, Indiana
- Foundation Estate in Rochester, Michigan
- NRG in Los Angeles, California
- Darth Mader Music in Los Angeles, California
- Allan Hessler's Studio
- Stevie Blacke's Studio
- A studio in London (a friend of the band recorded some short vocal parts, found in "The Death of Me")
- Mixed by David Bendeth at House of Loud Studio.

Part of the album was recorded on the band's tour bus. They had announced in previous years that they had wanted to do this. They cleared out parts of the back recreational area of the bus, and installed a small soundproof room and an area for a mixing board and computer. This is briefly visible in the video released by the band of Danny becoming 'disturbed' and was seen completely in the studio update video posted by Danny on his YouTube channel.

When the album was released, the first track, "Don't Pray for Me", the commotion is audible from video recording in Seattle during a live performance, when band member Ben asked the audience to vote for Danny to go to rehab.

== Release and promotion ==
The album was released on 6 August 2013 and two official singles on iTunes. "Run Free" was released officially on 4 December 2012. The song made its live debut on 8 August 2012, at the PNC Bank Arts Center in New Jersey, a side-stop show from the Mayhem Festival consisting only of As I Lay Dying, Asking Alexandria, and Slipknot. "The Death of Me" and "The Death of Me" (Rock Mix) were released through iTunes on 16 April 2013. Both were released with the official single album artwork. On 12 July 2013, Sumerian Records released a full album preview via YouTube which features snippets of all tracks on the standard edition of the album the same night as the band played on the TV show Guitar Center Sessions and revealed that Howard Jones is a guest vocalist on the 12th track "Until the End". On 16 July, the album was made available for pre-order on iTunes as well as the CD copy and package deals including merchandise to accompany the album. A digital copy of the album's second track "Killing You" downloads automatically when the album is pre-ordered on iTunes. On 23 July, the official music video for "The Death of Me" was released on YouTube by Sumerian Records, although the Rock Mix version of the song was used in place of the original version. There were several leaks of the album online, although Ben Bruce worked hard to take all of the leak links down.

Asking Alexandria played a "Midwest CD Release Tour" in support of the album's release, featuring Motionless in White, Crown the Empire, and Upon a Burning Body in the tour's line-up.

== Critical reception ==
Professional ratings
Aggregate scores
Source	Rating
Metacritic	(76/100)
Review scores
Source	Rating
AllMusic	3.5/5 stars
Artistdirect	5/5 stars
The Independent	3/5 stars
Shields Gazette	4/10 stars
Today's Metal	6/10

The album received mostly positive reviews, but also mixed reviews from several critics. At Metacritic, which assigns a normalised rating out of 100 to reviews from mainstream critics, the album has an average score of 76 out of 100 based on 4 reviews, indicating "generally favorable reviews". AllMusic wrote that the album showed a maturation of the band, a move away from simplistic "girls and drugs" metalcore to produce a more personal hard rock album which showed post-grunge influence, with the metalcore parts "smoothed down considerably".

=== Retrospect ===
Reflecting on the album in a 2016 interview with Alternative Press, guitarist Ben Bruce commented on the significant change in atmosphere upon recording their newest record, The Black, in comparison to From Death to Destiny, stating he felt the band were "in a different mindset than we were for From Death to Destiny. Danny clearly didn't want to be in the band and it was just a struggle the whole time. [On] From Death to Destiny, Danny just flat out refused to sing or scream over the songs we would write, so we had to make some huge compromises with that record. [On The Black] we got to go back to our roots. It was a lot of fun doing [The Black]."

== Commercial performance ==
From Death to Destiny debuted at No. 28 on the UK Albums Chart on its release, and also at No. 1 on the Rock & Metal Albums chart in the UK. It debuted at No. 5 on the Billboard 200, making it the band's best chart debut in the US. It is also the label's highest first-week sales with 41,082 units sold. The album has sold 151,000 copies in the US as of March 2016.

"Break Down the Walls" peaked on Billboard's US Mainstream Rock charts at 17th place.

== Track listing ==
All tracks are written by Danny Worsnop, Ben Bruce and James Cassells.

Standard Edition
No.	Title	Length
1.	"Don't Pray for Me"	4:40
2.	"Killing You"	3:11
3.	"The Death of Me"	4:18
4.	"Run Free"	4:10
5.	"Break Down the Walls"	3:31
6.	"Poison"	3:46
7.	"Believe"	4:31
8.	"Creature"	3:14
9.	"White Line Fever"	3:43
10.	"Moving On"	4:02
11.	"The Road"	3:26
12.	"Until the End" (featuring Howard Jones)	4:30
Total length:		47:09

Bonus track
No.	Title	Length
13.	"The Death of Me (Rock Mix)"	3:24
Total length:		50:33

European Deluxe Edition, FYE Exclusive Bonus Tracks and Japanese Edition
No.	Title	Writer(s)	Length
14.	"Dead"		4:00
15.	"Someone, Somewhere" (Ben Bruce acoustic)	Worsnop, Bruce, Cassells, Sam Bettley, Cameron Liddell	3:43

== Personnel ==
Asking Alexandria

- Danny Worsnop – lead vocals (except track 15), additional guitar
- Ben Bruce – lead guitar, backing vocals, lead vocals on tracks 6 and 15, music on "Break Down the Walls", composition on all tracks
- Cameron Liddell – rhythm guitar
- Sam Bettley – bass
- James Cassells – drums, composition on all tracks except "Break Down the Walls"

Additional musicians

- Howard Jones – additional guest vocals on "Until the End"
- Christopher Mesmer – piano on "The Death of Me"
- Laweta Casiano, Shalia Thompson, Vernaya Lee-Shields, Davonna Turner, Antoinette Simon, Chynell Casiano, Larry Miles, Sean Clinton, Manuel Casiano and Dearthur Wilson – Greater LA Cathedral Choir

Additional personnel

- Joey Sturgis – production, engineering, sound design, vocal engineering, vocal production at NRG Recording Studios, programming on "Run Free"
- Ash Avildsen – executive production, additional vocal production on "The Death of Me" and "Killing You", North America booking at The Pantheon Agency, art direction
- Brian Robbins – engineering
- David Bendeth – mixing at The House of Loud, Elmwood Park, NJ
- Kevin Churko – mixing on "The Death of Me (Rock Mix)"
- Ted Jensen – mastering at Sterling Sound, New York, NY
- Michael "Mitch" Milan – digital editing
- Nick Sampson – vocal production at NRG Recording Studios, vocal engineering, live choir arrangement, direction, engineering on "White Line Fever", vocal editing
- Allan Hessler – additional vocal engineering
- Bryan Pino and Joe Graves – additional vocal tracking at Bordur Studios
- Logan Mader – programming, electronic sound design at Darth Mader Music, programming on "Believe", music on "Break Down the Walls", vocal production, recording of Howard Jones' vocals on "Until the End", composition on "Break Down the Walls"
- The Maniac Agenda – programming, sound design on "Believe"
- Jussi Karvinen – music, composition on "Break Down the Walls"
- Devin Timmons and Brett Bair at The Artery Foundation – management
- Tom Taaffe – international booking at The Agency Group
- Kyle Borman – tour/co-management
- Eric German – legal representation at Mitchell Silberberg & Knupp LLP
- George Vallee – press
- Sasha Shemirani and Eric Curtis – photography
- Erin Johnson – model
- McBride Design/Unlimited Visual – artwork, layout design

== Charts ==
Chart (2013)	Peak position
Australian Albums (ARIA)	11
Austrian Albums (Ö3 Austria)	14
Belgian Albums (Ultratop Flanders)	113
Canadian Albums (Billboard)	14
German Albums (Offizielle Top 100)	24
UK Albums (Official Charts)	28
UK Rock & Metal Albums (Official Charts)	1
US Billboard 200	5
US Top Rock Albums (Billboard)	2
US Top Hard Rock Albums (Billboard)	1
