= Stand Up and Scream =

Studio album by Asking Alexandria
- Released: 15 September 2009
- Recorded: 19 May – 16 June 2009
- Studio: Foundation Recording (Connersville, Indiana)
- Genres: Metalcore; electronicore; post-hardcore
- Length: 48:15
- Label: Sumerian
- Producer: Joey Sturgis

Asking Alexandria chronology
The Irony of Your Perfection (2007)	Stand Up and Scream (2009)	Life Gone Wild (2010)

Singles from Stand Up and Scream
- 1. "Final Episode (Let's Change the Channel)" Released: 15 November 2009; 2. "If You Can't Ride Two Horses at Once... You Should Get Out of the Circus" Released: 21 November 2009; 3. "Not the American Average" Released: December 2009; 4. "A Prophecy" Released: 2 February 2011

Stand Up and Scream is the debut studio album by English rock band Asking Alexandria. Produced by Joey Sturgis, it was released on 15 September 2009 through Sumerian Records. The album has peaked at No. 170 on the Billboard 200, No. 29 on Top Independent albums, and No. 4 on Heatseekers Albums. The record managed to remain on the Heatseekers Albums chart at No. 36 until the end of July 2010.

The album is now considered a landmark in the metalcore genre. The album's sound was emulated by numerous bands during the first half of the 2010s.

== Background ==
The title of the album is chosen from a lyric in the second track "Final Episode (Let's Change the Channel)", where the relevant line within the chorus reads "Just stand up and scream, the tainted clock is counting down".

Six of the tracks featured on the album had demo counterparts released early on through the band's MySpace and PureVolume accounts. These include, "Nobody Don't Dance No More", "Final Episode (Let's Change the Channel)", "A Candlelit Dinner with Inamorta", "Not the American Average", "A Single Moment of Sincerity", and "I Was Once, Possibly, Maybe, Perhaps, a Cowboy King". When downloaded, the ID3 tags displayed Demo or Demo 2008.

The song "Hey There Mr. Brooks" is written as a homage to the film, Mr. Brooks. Its lyrics feature many references to scenes in the film.

== Music and lyrics ==
Stand Up and Scream incorporates elements of melodic metalcore, trance, techno, and pop. Alternative Press cateogorized the album as "scene music", and said it also incorporates elements of emo and screamo. The album employs death growls, clean vocals, staccato guitar riffs, open-note drop-tuned breakdowns, and synthesizer leads. The album drew comparisons to Bring Me the Horizon.

The album's instrumentation is considered to be simplistic. Revolver stated that the album was "a pointed rebuke of the athletic guitarwork and scraggly mosh parts of the previous generation — a breakdown-addled, electro-infused, lyrically vapid take on metalcore that was loathed by old-heads as it became the new face of the genre."

The album's lyrics have been described as being "not safe for work." Loudwire stated that the track "Not the American Average" contained "allusions to sexual assault." The band stopped playing the track live in 2019. Lead singer Danny Worsnop said the decision was because "everyone’s so fucking offended by everything." He continued:

"There’s the whole misogynistic and sexist angle [of the lyrics] that people could criticize it for, and the social climate has reached a point [where] that means we’re going to get ahead of the bullet and retire this one before it becomes an issue. I actually can’t stand playing it, so I’m glad – I’ve been trying to drop it for years!"

== Music videos ==
In September 2009, Asking Alexandria shot their debut music video for the song "Final Episode (Let's Change the Channel)". In the video, the musicians play in a dark room, dressed in black. Also shown is a table, on which stands the glass with water. Throughout the video, the glass gradually shifts to the edge of the table and finally falls down and breaks in the end.

In 2010, the music video for "A Prophecy" was released. It was filmed in Los Angeles in its entirety during the band's headlining tour, "Welcome to the Circus", in between tour dates. It features the band playing in a dark alley during a storm, and cuts between shots of the band and a woman falling through the ocean. There is also a shot of James Cassells spitting fire towards the end before the last breakdown.

In 2010, Asking Alexandria shot a performance video of "If You Can't Ride Two Horses at Once... You Should Get Out of the Circus" at Chain Reaction in Long Beach, California. It is included on their EP, Life Gone Wild.

During the Epicenter 2011, Asking Alexandria shot a performance video for "Not the American Average".

== Critical reception ==
Professional ratings
Review scores
Source	Rating
AllMusic	3/5 stars
Ultimate Guitar	8.5/10 stars

Phil Freeman of AllMusic criticized the album's tracks as "faceless and unmemorable" and did not believe fans of the genre would enjoy the album's electronic breaks.

Alternative Press Magazine included the track “If You Can’t Ride Two Horses At Once You Should Get Out Of The Circus” on its list of "13 metalcore songs any death-metal fan can like."

== Track listing ==
All tracks are written by Danny Worsnop, Ben Bruce and James Cassells; except where noted.

No.	Title	Writer(s)	Length
1.	"Alerion"		2:14
2.	"Final Episode (Let's Change the Channel)"		4:02
3.	"A Candlelit Dinner with Inamorta"		4:03
4.	"Nobody Don't Dance No More"	Worsnop, Bruce, Cassells, Cameron Liddell, Sam Bettley	3:59
5.	"Hey There Mr. Brooks" (featuring Shawn Milke of Alesana)		4:09
6.	"Hiatus" (instrumental)		1:45
7.	"If You Can't Ride Two Horses at Once... You Should Get Out of the Circus"	Worsnop, Bruce, Cassells, Liddell, Bettley	3:45
8.	"A Single Moment of Sincerity"		3:50
9.	"Not the American Average"		4:39
10.	"I Used to Have a Best Friend (But Then He Gave Me an STD)"		4:05
11.	"A Prophecy"		3:33
12.	"I Was Once, Possibly, Maybe, Perhaps a Cowboy King"	Worsnop, Bruce, Cassells, Liddell, Bettley	3:41
13.	"When Everyday's the Weekend"		4:23
Total length:			48:15

Japanese edition enhanced material
No.	Title	Length
1.	"Final Episode (Let's Change the Channel)" (music video)	4:41

== Personnel ==
Asking Alexandria

- Danny Worsnop – lead vocals, keyboards, programming
- Ben Bruce – lead guitar, backing vocals, keyboards, programming, co-lead vocals on tracks 8 and 9
- Cameron Liddell – rhythm guitar
- Sam Bettley – bass
- James Cassells – drums

Additional musicians

- Shawn Milke of Alesana – guest vocals on "Hey There Mr. Brooks"

Production

- Joey Sturgis – production, engineering, mixing, mastering
- Nick Sampson – additional editing
- Sons of Nero – artwork
- Phill Mamula – photography
- Amanda Fiore and Ash Avildsen – art conception
- RED Distribution – distribution

== Charts ==
Chart (2009)	Peak position
US Billboard 200	170
US Independent Albums (Billboard)	29

Chart (2011)	Peak position
US Heatseekers Albums (Billboard)	4
