= Metal Hammer Golden Gods Awards =

Music award

The following is a list of the Metal Hammer Golden Gods Awards winners.

== History ==
The Metal Hammer Golden Gods Awards were conceived by Metal Hammer magazine editor Chris Ingham, along with John O'Sullivan and Dave Bianchi, and were first held at the Kentish Town Forum in London in 2003. From its inception, the event was produced by John O'Sullivan and organized by the magazine’s events team.

The show was owned by Future Publishing until 2013, then operated by TeamRock from 2014 to 2016, and was repurchased by Future in 2017 following TeamRock’s collapse.

== Award ceremonies ==
=== 2003 ===
Held at the Forum, London
Hosted by Ian Camfield
Live main stage performance by Murderdolls, Shadows Fall, Soil and Raging Speedhorn.

==== Winners ====
- Best Album: AFI – Sing the Sorrow
- Best Underground act: Shadows Fall

=== 2004 ===
Held at Ocean, London
Hosted by Ian Camfield
Live main stage performance by HIM, Akercocke and Young Heart Attack.

==== Winners ====
- Best Album: Killswitch Engage – The End of Heartache

=== 2005 ===
Held at the Astoria, London
Hosted by Ian Camfield
Live main stage performance by Anthrax, Nightwish, Shadows Fall, Bullet for My Valentine and Trivium.

==== Winners ====
- Best UK Band: Lost Prophets
- Best Live: Slipknot
- Best Label: Roadrunner Records
- Best Newcomer: Nightwish
- Best Video: My Chemical Romance – "Helena"
- Spirit of Hammer: Black Sabbath
- Icon: Ville Valo
- Riff Lord: Zakk Wylde
- Young Guitar – Dimebag Tribute: Herman Li
- Best International: The Used
- Best Album: Judas Priest – Angel of Retribution
- Best Metal Band: Anthrax
- Golden God: Lemmy

=== 2006 ===
Held at Koko, London
Hosted By Ian Camfield
Live main stage performance by Bullet for My Valentine, DragonForce, Lacuna Coil and Viking Skull.

==== Winners ====
- Best Album: Coheed and Cambria – Good Apollo, I'm Burning Star IV, Volume One: From Fear Through the Eyes of Madness
- Riff Lord: Jerry Cantrell
- Best Album of the Past 20 Years: Slayer - Reign in Blood
- Best UK Band: Bullet for My Valentine
- Best International Band: Avenged Sevenfold
- Best Live Band: Trivium

=== 2007 ===
Held at Koko, London
Hosted by Jamey Jasta
Live main stage performance by Machine Head, Dimmu Borgir, Lamb of God, Turisas and Priestess.

==== Winners ====
- Best UK Band: Bullet for My Valentine
- Best Live Band: Lamb of God
- Best International Band: Killswitch Engage
- Best Underground Band: Job for a Cowboy
- Best Newcomer: Deathstars
- Best Video: Seize the Day - Avenged Sevenfold
- Riff Lord: Slash (Velvet Revolver, Guns N’ Roses)
- Shredder: Bill Kelliher and Brent Hinds (Mastodon)
- Best Metal Label: Roadrunner Records
- Album of the Year: The Blackening - Machine Head
- Spirit of Hammer: Napalm Death
- Golden God: Robb Flynn (Machine Head)
- Icon Award: Slayer
- Best Viral Campaign: Buckcherry
- Best Comeback: Heaven & Hell

=== 2008 ===
Held at Indigo at the O2, London
Hosted by Oderus Urungus
Live main stage performance by Disturbed, Children of Bodom, In Flames, Apocalyptica and Testament.

==== Winners ====
- Best Album: Testament – The Formation of Damnation
- Best UK Band: Iron Maiden
- Best Live Band: Machine Head
- Best Breakthrough: Apocalyptica
- Metal For The Masses: William Gledhil
- Best Video: "The Serpentine Offering"
- Best Metal Label: RoadRunner Records
- Spirit Of Hammer: Max and Igor Cavalera
- Best Debut: Airbourne "Runnin' Wild"
- Icon Award: Eddie
- Dimebag Darrell Shredder Award: Alexi Laiho
- Riff Lord: Dave Mustaine
- International Band of the Year: In Flames
- Golden God: Kerry King

=== 2009 ===
Held at Indigo at the O2, London
Hosted by Jason Rouse
Live main stage performance by Trivium, Anvil, Amon Amarth, DevilDriver, Suicide Silence and Saxon.

==== Winners ====
- Best Album: Lamb of God – Wrath
- Best New Band: Five Finger Death Punch
- Best Underground Band — Behmoth
- Best Metal Label: RoadRunner Records
- Spirt of Metal: Saxon
- Dimebag Darrel Sherdder Award: HermanLi/ Sam Toteman
- Legends Award: Def Leppard
- Best Breakthrough act: Amon Amarth
- Metal as Fuck: Anvil
- Inspiration: Emperor
- Riff Lord: Steve Vai
- Best Live Band: Slipknot
- Best International Band: Slipknot
- Best UK Group: Iron Maiden
- Golden God: Iron Maiden

=== 2010 ===
Held at Indigo at the O2, London
Hosted by Steel Panther
Live main stage performance by Steel Panther, Airbourne, Five Finger Death Punch, Skindred and Evile.
HMS Hammer performances by Nonpoint, Sonic Syndicate, Rise to Remain and Hellyeah.

==== Winners ====
- Best New Band: Rise to Remain
- Best Underground: Immortal
- Best Drummer: Mike Portnoy
- Global Metal: Demonic Resurrection
- Best Live: Machine Head
- Best Event: Download Festival
- Riff Lord: Joe Perry
- Spirit of Hammer: Sir Christopher Lee
- Best UK: Bullet for My Valentine
- Metal As ####: Evile
- Dimebag Darrell 'Shredder': Zoltan Bathory
- Breakthrough Artist: Five Finger Death Punch
- Inspiration: Tom G Warrior
- Best Album: Heaven & Hell – The Devil You Know
- Best International Band: Lamb of God
- Defenders of the Faith: Tracy and Jon Morter
- Golden God: Zakk Wylde

=== 2011 ===
Held at Indigo at the O2, London
Hosted by Alice Cooper
Live main stage performance by Twisted Sister, Skindred, Devin Townsend, Sylosis and Buckcherry.
HMS Hammer performances by The Dead Lay Waiting, Tesseract, Black Spiders and Biohazard.

==== Winners ====
- Best New Band: The Damned Things
- Metal as ####: Nergal
- Best Underground: Primordial
- Dimebag Darrell 'Shredder': Gus G
- Breakthrough Artist: Sabaton
- Best UK: Iron Maiden
- Best Live: Skindred
- Inspiration: Twisted Sister
- Best International Band: Avenged Sevenfold
- Best Album: Killing Joke – Absolute Dissent
- Best Event: The Big 4 Coming Together
- Riff Lord: Pepper Keenan / Kirk Windstein
- Spirit of Hammer: Diamond Head
- Icons: Judas Priest
- Golden God: Rob Zombie

=== 2012 ===
Held at Indigo at the O2, London
Hosted by Chris Jericho
Live main stage performance by Anthrax, Sabaton, Ghost, Biohazard and Watain.
HMS Hammer performances by Shadows Fall, Fozzy, While She Sleeps, Attica Rage and Evil Scarecrow.

==== Winners ====
Year	Nominee / work	Award	Result
2012
2012	The Defiled	Best New Band	Won
2012	Watain	Best Underground Band	Won
2012	Devin Townsend	'Dimebag Darrell Shredder' Award	Won
2012	Ghost	Breakthrough Band Award	Won
2012	Rammstein	Best Live Band Award	Won
2012	Iron Maiden's U.K. Tour	Best Event Award	Won
2012	X-Japan	Best International Band Award	Won
2012	Saxon	Best UK Band Award	Won
2012	Mastodon – The Hunter	Best Album Award	Won
2012	Anthrax	Metal as #### Award	Won
2012	Vinnie Paul	Best Drummer	Won
2012	Roadrunner Records	Inspiration Award	Won
2012	Robb Flynn and Phil Demmel	Riff Lord Award	Won
2012	Bill Bailey	Spirit of Hammer Award	Won
2012	Fear Factory	Icon Award	Won
2012	Joey DeMaio	The Golden God Award	Won

=== 2013 ===
Held at Indigo at the O2, London
Hosted by Devin Townsend
Live main stage performance by Motörhead, Airbourne, Five Finger Death Punch, Coal Chamber and Paradise Lost.
HMS Hammer performances by Kvelertak, Visions Of Disorder, The Defiled and Heavens Basement.

==== Winners ====
Year	Nominee / work	Award	Result
2013
2013	Bleed from Within	Best New Band	Won
2013	The Algorithm	Best Underground Band	Won
2013	Eric Calderone	'Dimebag Darrell Shredder' Award	Won
2013	Asking Alexandria	Breakthrough Band Award	Won
2013	Gojira	Best Live Band Award	Won
2013	The Heavy Metal Census Campaign	Best Event Award	Won
2013	Stone Sour	Best International Band Award	Won
2013	Black Sabbath	Best UK Band Award	Won
2013	Black Sabbath – 13	Best Album Award	Won
2013	Burgerkill	Metal as #### Award	Won
2013	Paradise Lost	Inspiration Award	Won
2013	Scott Gorham	Riff Lord Award	Won
2013	Brian Blessed	Spirit of Hammer Award	Won
2013	Alice in Chains	Icon Award	Won
2013	Motörhead	The Golden God Award	Won
2013	Doro	Legend Award	Won

=== 2014 ===
Held at Indigo at the O2, London
Hosted by Steel Panther
Live main stage performance by Steel Panther, The Dillinger Escape Plan, Black Stone Cherry, While She Sleeps and Behemoth.
HMS Hammer performances by Orange Goblin, Kill Devil Hill, Upon a Burning Body, Hounds and Dying Fetus.

==== Winners ====
Year	Nominee / work	Award	Result
2014
2014	Devil You Know	Best New Band	Won
2014	Wardruna	Best Underground Band	Won
2014	Misha Mansoor	'Dimebag Darrell Shredder' Award	Won
2014	Of Mice & Men	Breakthrough Artist Award	Won
2014	Killswitch Engage	Best Live Band Award	Won
2014	Avenged Sevenfold	Best International Band Award	Won
2014	Iron Maiden	Best UK Band Award	Won
2014	Behemoth – The Satanist	Best Album Award	Won
2014	Hanoi Rocks	Inspiration Award	Won
2014	Mark Tremonti	Riff Lord Award	Won
2014	David Prowse	Spirit of Hammer Award	Won
2014	Michael Schenker	Icon Award	Won
2014	Mikael Åkerfeldt	The Golden God Award	Won
2014	Orphaned Land and Khalas	Global Metal Award	Won
2014	Devin Townsend	King of the Internet	Won
2014	Grand Theft Auto V	Game of the Year	Won
2014	Steel Panther – "Party Like It's the End of the World"	Video of the Year	Won

=== 2015 ===
Held at Indigo at the O2, London
Hosted by Scott Ian
Live main stage performance by Suicidal Tendencies, We Are Harlot, Babymetal featuring DragonForce, At the Gates and Killing Joke.
HMS Hammer performances by Code Orange, Butcher Babies, Upon a Burning Body and Napalm Death.

==== Winners ====
Year	Nominee / work	Award	Result
2015
2015	We Are Harlot	Best New Band	Won
2015	Winterfylleth	Best Underground Band	Won
2015	Richie Faulkner	'Dimebag Darrell Shredder' Award	Won
2015	Babymetal	Breakthrough Band Award	Won
2015	Of Mice & Men	Best Live Band Award	Won
2015	Slipknot	Best International Band Award	Won
2015	Bring Me the Horizon	Best UK Band Award	Won
2015	Faith No More – Sol Invictus	Best Album Award	Won
2015	At the Gates	Inspiration Award	Won
2015	Matt Taylor	Spirit of Hammer Award	Won
2015	Mike Muir	Icon Award	Won
2015	Dave Mustaine	The Golden God Award	Won
2015	District Unknown/Martyrs of Metal	Global Metal Award	Won
2015	Anthony Vincent	King of the internet	Won
2015	Epitaph Records	Best Independent Label	Won
2015	Tommy Thayer	Defender of the Faith	Won

=== 2016 ===
Held at the Hammersmith Apollo, London
Hosted by Jamey Jasta
Live main stage performance by Amon Amarth, Halestorm, Gojira and 'A Salute to Lemmy' with Saxon featuring Phil & Mikkey.

==== Winners ====
Year	Nominee / work	Award	Result
2016
2016	Creeper	Best New Band	Won
2016	Enslaved	Best Underground band	Won
2016	Lzzy Hale	'Dimebag Darrell Shredder' Award	Won
2016	Beartooth	Breakthrough Band Award	Won
2016	Lamb of God	Best Live Band Award	Won
2016	Ghost	Best International Band Award	Won
2016	Asking Alexandria	Best UK Band Award	Won
2016	Iron Maiden – The Book of Souls	Best Album Award	Won
2016	Anthrax	Inspiration Award	Won
2016	Phil Campbell	Riff Lord Award	Won
2016	Nikki Sixx	Icon Award	Won
2016	Joey Jordison	The Golden God Award	Won
2016	Chthonic	Global Metal Band	Won
2016	Parkway Drive - "Vice Grip"	Video of the Year	Won
2016	Prosthetic Records	Best Independent Label	Won

=== 2017 ===
Held at Indigo, O2, London
Hosted by Chris Jericho
Live main stage performance by Orange Goblin, Avatar, Clutch and Mastodon.

==== Winners ====
- Best New Band: Venom Prison
- Best Underground Band: Pallbearer
- Best UK Band: Architects
- Best International Band: Avenged Sevenfold
- Best Live Band: Mastodon
- Best Independent Label: Nuclear Blast
- Dimebag Darrell 'Shredder': Joel O'Keeffe (Airbourne)
- Game of the Year: Iron Maiden: The Legacy of the Beast
- Breakthrough: Avatar

==== Non fan-voted categories ====
- Riff Lord: Devin Townsend
- Defender of the Faith: Ben Ward (Orange Goblin) & his partner Sandie Soriano
- Inspiration: Exodus
- Best Album: Gojira – Magma
- Spirit of Hammer: Prophets of Rage
- Icon: The Dillinger Escape Plan
- Golden God: Black Sabbath

=== 2018 ===
Held at Indigo at the O2, London
Hosted by Jamey Jasta
Live main stage performance by Carpenter Brut, Baroness, Myrkur, Meshuggah and Parkway Drive.

==== Winners ====
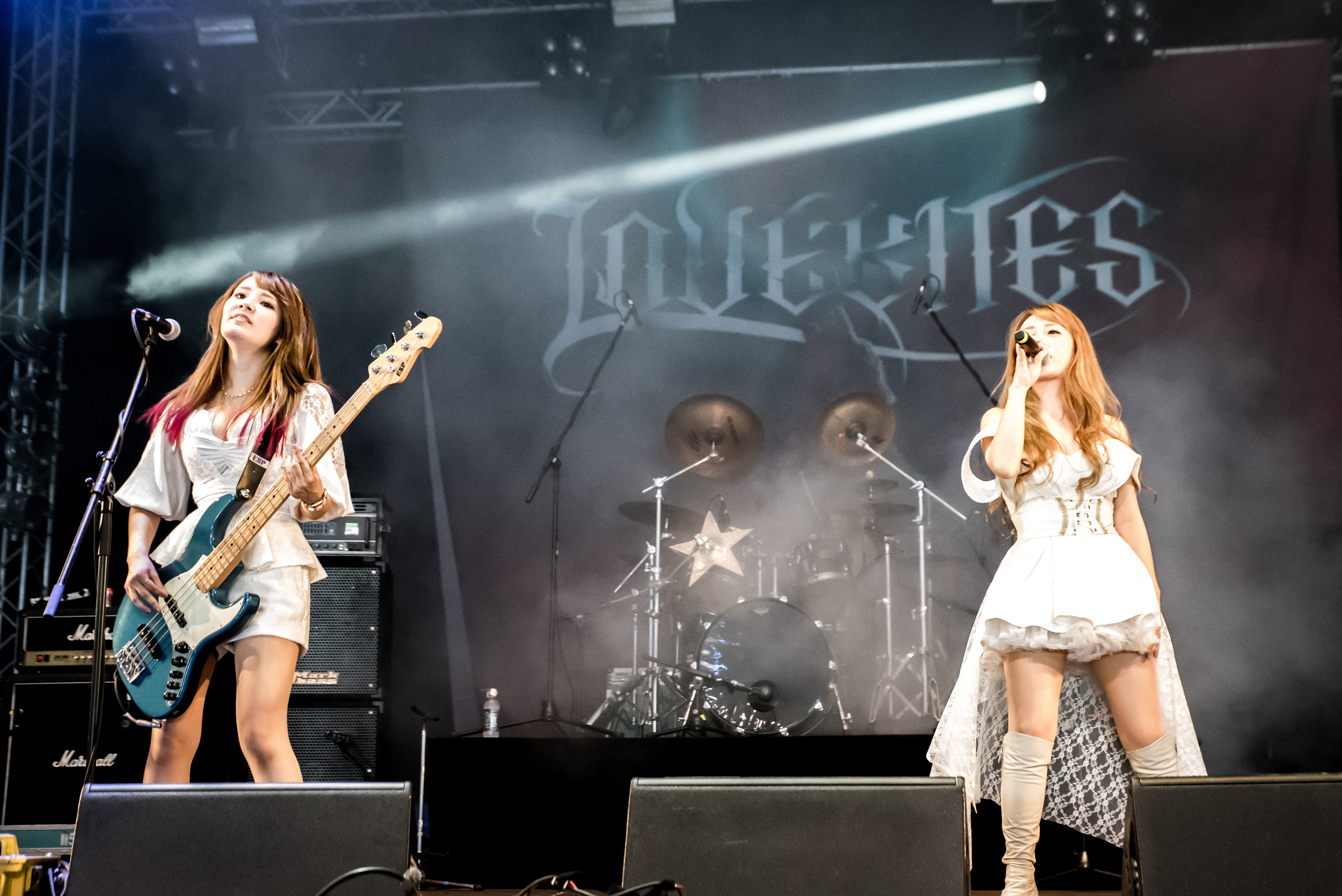
2018 Best New Band winners, Lovebites (performing at Wacken Open Air 2018)

- Best New Band: Lovebites
- Best Underground Band: Wolves in the Throne Room
- Best UK Band: Judas Priest
- Best International Band: Arch Enemy
- Best Event: Download Festival
- Best Live Band: Lacuna Coil
- Best Independent Label: Sumerian Records
- Breakthrough Artist: Code Orange

==== Non fan-voted categories ====
- Riff Lord: Wes Borland
- Defender Of The Faith: Parkway Drive
- Inspiration: Meshuggah
- Best Album: Myrkur – Mareridt
- Global Metal Award: Kaoteon
- Spirit Of Hammer: Jessica Pimentel
- Icon: James Keenan
- Golden God: Ozzy Osbourne
