= Ben Bruce =

British guitarist (born 1988)

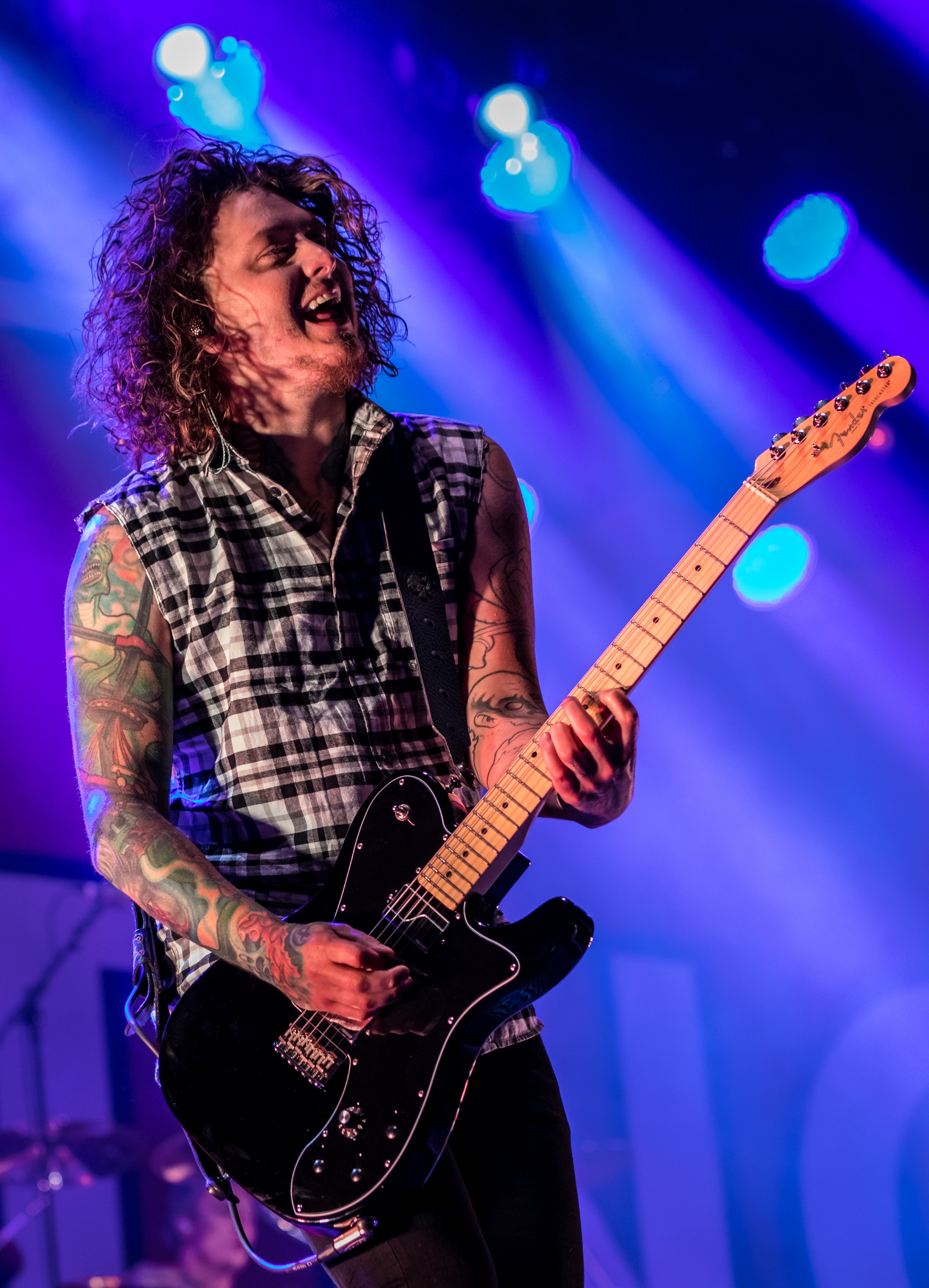
- Bruce performing with Asking Alexandria in 2018

Background information
- Born: Benjamin Paul Bruce; 31 October 1988 (age 37); Wandsworth, London, England
- Origin: Dubai, United Arab Emirates
- Genres: Metalcore; heavy metal; post-hardcore; electronicore; hard rock
- Occupations: Musician; songwriter; record producer
- Instruments: Guitar; vocals
- Years active: 2003–present
- Formerly of: Asking Alexandria
- Spouses: Samantha Cassaro (m. 2013; div. 2015) Ciara Bertjens (m. 2017)
- Children: 4

Benjamin Paul Bruce (born 31 October 1988) is an English musician, best known as the lead guitarist and backing vocalist of rock band Asking Alexandria until his departure in January 2024.

Bruce founded Asking Alexandria in 2003, while living in Dubai. After this initial iteration broke up, he moved back to the United Kingdom and started the band again in 2009 with Danny Worsnop. Bruce has also performed as a solo artist.

== Biography ==
=== Early life ===
Bruce was born in Wandsworth, South London on 31 October 1988. At the age of six he and his family moved to Dubai. He would later move back to England in 2006 at age 17 in order to gain recognition in the music industry, which he would gain after forming Asking Alexandria.

Bruce started playing the electric guitar at the age of 12 after being inspired by blues guitarists such as Eric Clapton, B.B. King and Gary Moore he then started listening to pop-punk groups such as Blink-182, Sum 41 and Green Day and later, metal bands like Metallica and Iron Maiden. He insisted on learning to play electric guitar and would learn songs by ear. Bruce has stated that some of his favourite records consist of: Metallica's Kill 'Em All for its raw and aggressive sounds, Guns N' Roses' Appetite for Destruction, and Slipknot's debut album which influenced him into more extreme metal genres.

=== 2006–2024: Asking Alexandria ===
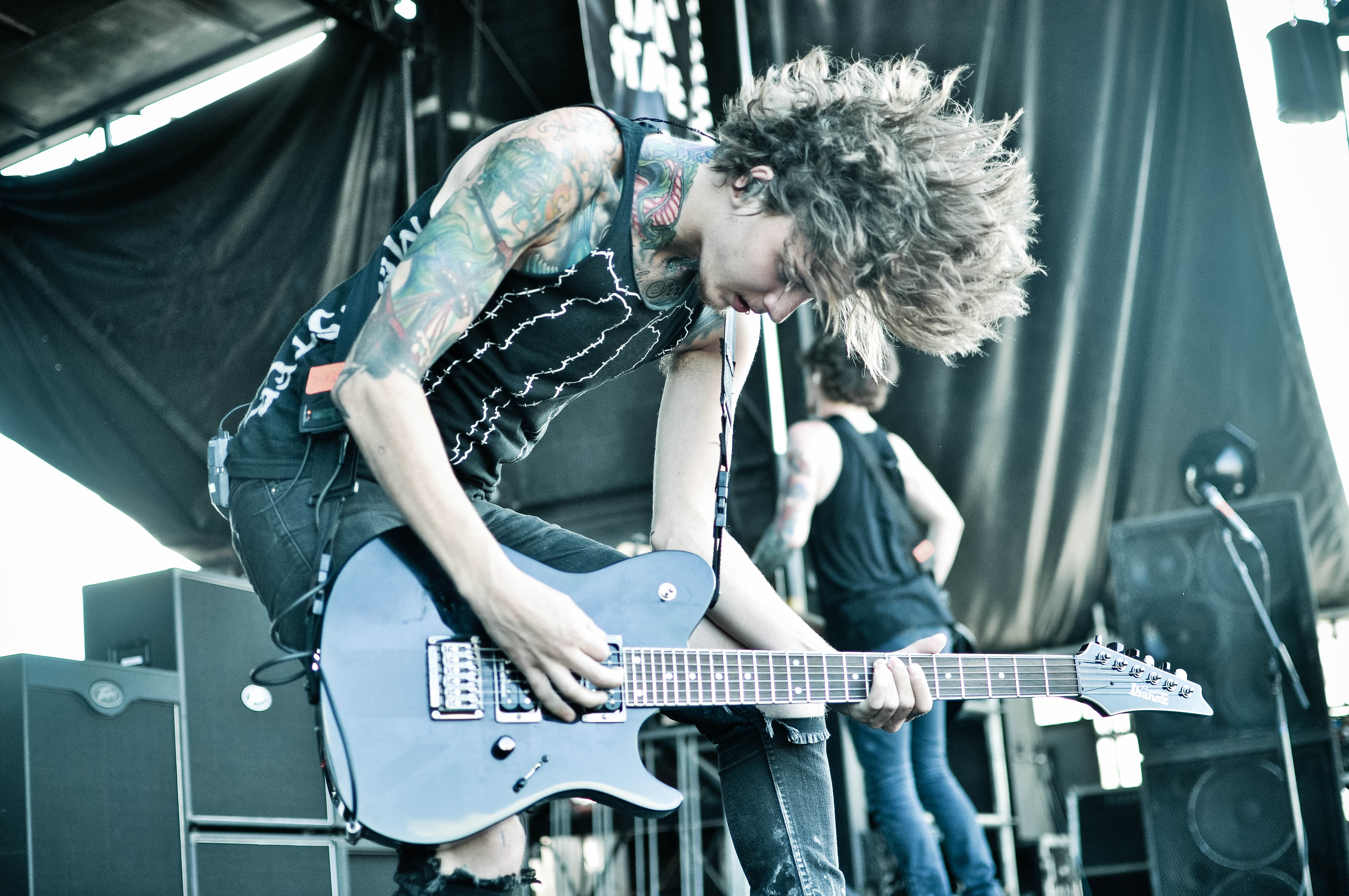
Ben Bruce performing at Vans Warped Tour in 2011

While living in the UAE, Bruce formed the first incarnation of Asking Alexandria in 2003 under the names "Amongst Us" and "End of Reason" before settling to the current name in 2006, which consisted of entirely different members compared to that of the band's lineup from 2008. The band released their debut album titled The Irony of Your Perfection. Bruce moved back to England, Nottingham in 2006 at the age of 17 with the band following, only for them to leave after a month due to not being fully committed to the project. Bruce then reassembled the band with new members from the local area, including lead singer Danny Worsnop, of which he had moved into his flat apartment in York. He carried the name 'Asking Alexandria' over to the new lineup due to not wanting to bother to come up with a brand new name, so he stuck with the old one. When asked why he chose that particular name, he explained that "Most bands have a pretty shit band name, so I just came up with something. I came up with Alexandria as a human name, because people relate to humans." although the reason for using the word 'asking' is not explained.

The band released their first official debut album titled Stand Up and Scream in 2009 via Sumerian and Victory records, produced by Joey Sturgis. Although it didn't chart in the UK, it did chart in the US, peaking at; 4 in the Top Heatseekers, 24 in the Top Hard Rock Albums and 29 in the Top Independent Albums. The band's second album, titled Reckless & Relentless, was released in 2011 via Sumerian records, which again featured Joey Sturgis. This time, the album did chart in the UK, peaking at 7 on the UK Rock Chart, and also charted in Australia at 30 on the Australian Albums Chart. They released their third album, titled From Death to Destiny in 2013 via Sumerian Records and peaked in the US at 5 and the Top Hard Rock Albums at 1, and also charted in the UK at 28 and in Australia at 11, making it their most commercially successful album to date.

On 19 January 2024, Bruce announced on Instagram that he was stepping away from Asking Alexandria to spend more time with his family.

=== 2014–present: Solo ===
Bruce announced that he would start recording his first album as a solo artist on 6 January 2014, after Danny Worsnop's open involvement with both Asking Alexandria, his solo album, and his latest project We Are Harlot. When interviewed by Artistdirect's Rick Florino, Bruce stated that he had recorded his solo album when asked about the direction it is leaning into he responded with "There's nothing really heavy about it. There are a few classic rock 'n' roll tunes on there. Really, it's a lot of softer rock stuff." and compared it to Keane or Oasis, going on to say that it is a more of a chilled rock album, he also stated that he is the primary vocalist of the album and has eased off the guitar duties for this particular album. In January 2015, Danny Worsnop stated that Bruce has completed his album and will be releasing it that same year.

In March 2014, Bruce was revealed as a featured artist on the cover compilation album of Florence + The Machine, released by Sumerian Records, of which he covered the single Shake It Out. When Rocksound queried on the sound of the solo album, Bruce stated that he'd describe it as "Chilled out. I'd honestly liken it to Keane, Robbie Williams and Oasis." and further stated that he finds Robbie Williams to be his main influence. It was also revealed that the album will be released through Sumerian Records later in 2015, however due to the departure of Danny Worsnop from Asking Alexadria, Bruce decided to put his solo career on hold while he gets his main band up and running again with a new singer and album. Since then he has stated that he has written more material for his solo project and intends to record new songs along with re-recording his older ones once he has some time off from touring.

== Other ventures ==
=== 2011–present: BB Clothing ===
Bruce started his own clothing line originally in 2011 and existed as an online business, separated from official merchandise associated with Asking Alexandria. Bruce remained inactive on the project after 27 June 2013, the last date which he added new designs to his brand, but released a statement that more designs will be released in the following year.

=== 2014–present: KBB Records ===
"KBB Records is a label run by artists, for artists. With my love and passion for music along with my knowledge and understanding of the music industry it's our goal to work alongside incredible artists of all genres and to create and release amazing music for the world to fall in love with."

— Loudwire, Chad Childers, 'Asking Alexandria Guitarist Ben Bruce Launches New KBB Records Label'

In March 2014, it was announced that Bruce, along with Asking Alexandria's manager, Kyle Borman, had launched a record label called 'KBB', and had signed a rap metal band called 'Scare Don't Fear'. The band themselves decided to sign with KBB due to other record labels requesting them to change their style of music, while Ben Bruce expressed that he didn't want anything to change in their sound and to maintain it instead, giving the band more freedom in their creativity.

It was revealed later that month that Caroline Records will be in a distribution partnership with KBB Records. The label's first release and the band's debut album, 'From the Ground Up', was released on 17 June the same year. In May the same year, it was revealed that metal band 'The Family Ruin' had also been signed and added to the roster and will be releasing an album later the same year.

When he was asked why he created the label in the first place, he explained that he loved every aspect of music and wanted to be further involved in the music industry whether it's writing it, performing it, or helping other bands, and explained that it initially started with "groups of my friends starting bands and asking for my help to manage them. I thought, 'Wouldn't it be great if I could actually help bands that I think are worthy of being helped and deserve to be somewhere more than just giving them advice?'"

Current roster

- Scare Don't Fear (2014–present)
- The Family Ruin (2014–present)
- Run 2 Cover (2015–present)
- A Fall To Break (2015–present)

=== Filmography ===
Released on 13 October 2017, Ben Bruce was featured in the film American Satan. Bruce plays the character 'Leo Donovan'.

Ben has also done filming the spin-off series of American Satan called Paradise City in 2019, the series was later released on 25 March 2021.

== Discography ==
Solo Career

- "Shake It Out" (Single, 2014)
- "Someone, Somewhere" (Single, 2014)

Asking Alexandria

- The Irony of Your Perfection (2007)
- Stand Up and Scream (2009)
- Reckless & Relentless (2011)
- From Death to Destiny (2013)
- The Black (2016)
- Asking Alexandria (2017)
- Like a House on Fire (2020)
- See What's on the Inside (2021)
- Where Do We Go from Here? (2023)

=== Collaborations ===
Year	Song	Contribution	Artist
2013	"Discovering Oceans"	Vocals	City in the Sea
2013	"Overcast"	Guitar	City in the Sea
2017	"Woopty Woo Woo (Rock Version)"	Producer	Whitney Peyton
2018	"Figured It Out"	Writer/Vocals	Whitney Peyton
2022	"FU2"	Composer	Hyro the Hero
2025	"Black Rambo"	Writer/Producer	Hyro the Hero
2026	Vindicate	Co-Writer/Composer	Black Veil Brides

== Accolades ==
Nominated work	Year	Award	Result	Position
Ben Bruce	2011	Altpress' Guitarist of the Year	Won	—
Ben Bruce	2012	Guitar World's Top 12 Hot Male Guitar Players for 2012	Won	11
Ben Bruce	2012	Kerrang! Awards 2012 Hottest Male	Won	—
Ben Bruce	2013	Kerrang! Awards 2013 Hottest Male	Won	—
Ben Bruce	2014	Kerrang! Awards 2014 Hottest Male	Nominated	—
Ben Bruce	2015	Metal Hammer Golden Gods Awards Dimebag Darrell Shredder		
