= Beyond the Gate =

Beyond the Gate may refer to:

- Beyond the Gate (film), a 1979 film
- Beyond the Gate (album), a 2006 album by Moi dix Mois
- Beyond the Gate, an album by Wretched
