= Awake (Mutiny Within song) =

Single by Mutiny Within

from the album Mutiny Within
- Released: November 16, 2009
- Recorded: Dec 2008 – Sept 2009 at Bieler Bros. Studios in Pompano Beach, Florida
- Genre: Metalcore, progressive metal, melodic death metal
- Length: 3:45
- Label: Roadrunner
- Songwriter(s): Chris Clancy, Andrew Jacobs
- Producer(s): Jason Bieler

Mutiny Within singles chronology
"Awake" (2009)	"Lethean" (2010)

Audio sample
- file; help

"Awake" is the first single released by American heavy metal band Mutiny Within from their self titled debut album. It was digitally released on November 16, 2009, and was offered as a free download on November 2 for only 24 hours at Roadrunner Records official website to promote their new album. A demo version of the song was included on the compilation album "Annual Assault", released by Roadrunner in 2009, which included songs from other Roadrunner's heavy metal bands, like Trivium, Slipknot and Machine Head.

== Music video ==
A music video was released for "Awake" on January 7, 2010. The clip, which was directed by Patrick Kendall (known by his work with Megadeth, Incubus and Sugarcult), features the band playing the song at an old factory outside their hometown.

== Personnel ==
Mutiny Within

- Chris Clancy – vocals
- Daniel Bage – guitars
- Brandon Jacobs – guitars, guitar solo
- Andrew Jacobs – bass guitar
- Drew Stavola – keyboards, keyboard solo
- Bill Fore – drums

Production

- Jason Bieler – producer
- Matt LaPlant – engineering, digital editing
- Jason Suecof – additional production, digital editing, additional engineering
- Mark Lewis – additional engineering, additional digital editing
- Michael Leslie – additional engineering, additional digital editing
- Chris Clancy – additional digital editing, art direction
- Martyn "Ginge" Ford – mixer
- Jeff Rose – mixer
- Ted Jensen – mastering
- Viktor Koen – art direction, design, illustration
- Bill Fore – art direction
- Pieter M. Van Hattem – photography
- Madelyn Scarpulla – art supervision
- Gail Marowitz – creative direction
