= Die Without Hope =

Studio album by Carnifex
- Released: March 4, 2014
- Studios: Audiohammer Studios, Sanford, FL, USA
- Genres: Deathcore, symphonic black metal
- Length: 38:04
- Label: Nuclear Blast
- Producer: Mark Lewis

Carnifex chronology
Until I Feel Nothing (2011)	Die Without Hope (2014)	Slow Death (2016)

Singles from Die Without Hope
- 1. "Dragged into the Grave" Released: January 16, 2014

Die Without Hope is the fifth studio album by American deathcore band Carnifex. It was made in Audiohammer Studios in Sanford, Florida and was produced by Mark Lewis (no relation to vocalist Scott Lewis). The album was released on March 4, 2014. The song "Dragged into the Grave" was released as Carnifex's first single on January 16, 2014. On February 3, the band streamed a second song titled, "Condemned to Decay" on Nuclear Blast's YouTube channel. It is the band's first album to feature lead guitarist Jordan Lockrey.

It is considered by some to be among the best releases in the deathcore genre.

== Critical reception ==
Professional ratings
Aggregate scores
Source	Rating
Metacritic	81/100
Review scores
Source	Rating
Alternative Press	4/5 stars
Exclaim!	7/10
Outburn	8/10
Rock Sound	9/10

Die Without Hope garnered critical acclaim from music critics. Metacritic, a website that scores albums based on a weighted average from selected ratings and reviews, gave a Metascore of an 81 out of 100 indicating "universal acclaim". At Alternative Press, Dan Slessor rated the album four stars out of five, stating that because of their short hiatus the release "seems to have energized them–and then some." In addition, Slessor adds that "With so much competition to garner the deathcore audience, Carnifex make it darn clear they are ready to fight tooth and nail for what is rightfully theirs." Amy Sciarretto of Outburn rated the album an eight out of ten, writing that on the release they band are "letting out plenty of blood soaked roars and musical brutality" on which it "will surely induce maximum headbanging, but it's not for marginal or mainstream metal fans." At Rock Sound, Jack Rogers rated the album a nine out of ten, saying that "it’s clear that Carnifex have firmly reclaimed their rightful place back on the throne" because the release "shows them at their most uncompromising, bleak and arse-splittingly heavy." Bradley Zorgdrager of Exclaim! rated the album a seven out of a ten, and according to him the release comes "With impressive growth, and while still operating within the genre's tight confines, Carnifex put the final nail in deathcore's coffin, giving it an appropriate sendoff."

In 2021, Eli Enis of Revolver included the album in their list of "15 Essential Deathcore Albums" and stated that the album is "a terrific entry point for newcomers and an undeniable classic for longtime fans."

== Track listing ==
All lyrics are written by Scott Lewis; all music is composed by Carnifex.

No.	Title	Length
1.	"Salvation Is Dead"	4:40
2.	"Dark Days"	3:34
3.	"Condemned to Decay"	3:36
4.	"Die Without Hope"	5:23
5.	"Hatred and Slaughter"	4:12
6.	"Dragged into the Grave"	3:54
7.	"Rotten Souls"	3:57
8.	"Last Words"	2:59
9.	"Reflection of the Forgotten" (instrumental)	1:05
10.	"Where the Light Dies"	4:44
Total length:		38:04

== Personnel ==
Writing, performance and production credits are adapted from the album liner notes.

Carnifex

- Scott Lewis – vocals
- Jordan Lockrey – lead guitar
- Cory Arford – rhythm guitar
- Fred Calderon – bass
- Shawn Cameron – drums, keyboards

Additional musicians

- Mark Lewis – guitar solo on "Salvation Is Dead" and "Dark Days"
- Jason Suecof – guitar solo on "Hatred and Slaughter"
- Cassie Morris (Unicorn Death) – piano, programming

Production

- Mark Lewis – production, engineering, mixing, mastering
- Eyal Levi – digital editing, drum assistant
- Godmachine – cover
- Marcelo Vasco – layout

== Charts ==
Chart (2014)	Peak position
German Albums (Offizielle Top 100)	81
US Billboard 200	98
US Independent Albums (Billboard)	21
US Top Hard Rock Albums (Billboard)	5
US Top Rock Albums (Billboard)	24
