= Jason Suecof =

American record producer (born 1980)

- Born: April 3, 1980 (age 46)
- Genres: Rock; heavy metal; extreme metal
- Occupations: Record producer; audio engineer; musician
- Instrument: Guitar
- Years active: 2003–present
- Member of: Charred Walls of the Damned
- Formerly of: Capharnaum
- Website: audiohammerstudios.com

Jason Suecof (born April 3, 1980) is an American record producer, audio engineer, and guitarist best known for his work with heavy metal bands such as Trivium, Battlecross, Death Angel, All That Remains, Bury Your Dead, The Black Dahlia Murder and The Autumn Offering. In addition, Suecof also has been the guitarist for heavy metal bands Capharnaum and Charred Walls of the Damned.

== Career ==
He produces most of his albums at his own Orlando, Florida-based studio, Audio Hammer. He has produced and/or mixed bands such as Austrian Death Machine, Death Angel, Battlecross, Chelsea Grin, All That Remains, Motionless in White, Bury Your Dead, August Burns Red, Cognizance (band), The Black Dahlia Murder, Dååth, The Autumn Offering, Luna Mortis, Chimaira, DevilDriver, God Forbid, If Hope Dies, Trivium, Job for a Cowboy, Whitechapel, Mutiny Within, Dir En Grey, Sanctity, and Odd Crew. Suecof has been a member of the technical death metal band Capharnaum, as well as the comic project Crotchduster (under the alias of Fornicus 'Fuckmouth' McFlappy). In 2010, he joined drummer Richard Christy's new project, Charred Walls of the Damned as their guitarist. Suecof is in a wheelchair due to spinal meningitis at age two, though he makes light of his condition and retains a sense of humor about it.

== Production discography ==
Year	Band	Album	Type	Label	Role	Released
2026	Nekrogoblikon	"Goblins Are Better than Trolls (2026 Re-Recording)"	Single	Self Release	Producer (John Goblikon's vocals), engineer (John Goblikon's vocals), mixing	July 17, 2026
2026	Devildriver	Strike and Kill	Album	Napalm	Producer (drums), recording (drums)	July 10, 2026
2026	Six Feet Under	Next to Die	Album	Metal Blade	Recording (rhythm guitars), guest guitar solo (track 1)	April 24, 2026
2026	Monstrosity	Screams from Beneath the Surface	Album	Metal Blade	Recording (bass, drums), mixing	March 13, 2026
2025	Exodus	"He's a Woman - She's a Man" (Scorpions cover)	Single	Napalm	Recording (vocals)	April 22, 2025
2025	Enterprise Earth	Descent Into Madness	EP	Self Release	Engineer (drums)	January 30, 2025
2024	Job for a Cowboy	Moon Healer	Album	Metal Blade	Producer	February 23, 2024
2024	Enterprise Earth	Death:An Anthology	Album	MNRK	Engineer (drums)	February 2, 2024
2023	The Convalescence	Harvesters of Flesh and Bone	Album	Cleopatra	Producer, recording, mixing	November 3, 2023
2023	Carnifex	Necromanteum	Album	Nuclear Blast	Producer, mixing, mastering, engineer	October 6, 2023
2022	Nekrogoblikon	The Fundamental Slimes and Humours	Album	Mystery Box	Producer, mastering, engineer	April 1, 2022
2022	Enterprise Earth	The Chosen	Album	eOne	Engineer (drums)	January 14, 2022
2020	Six Feet Under	Nightmares of the Decomposed	Album	Metal Blade	Recording (additional)	October 2, 2020
2019	Cognizance (band)	Malignant Dominion	Album	Prosthetic	Producer, mixing	September 6, 2019
2019	Carnifex	World War X	Album	Nuclear Blast	Producer, mixing, engineer	August 2, 2019
2019	Death Angel	Humanicide	Album	Nuclear Blast	Producer	May 31, 2019
2019	Enterprise Earth	Luciferous	Album	eOne	Producer	April 5, 2019
2019	Arrival of Autumn	Harbinger	Album	Nuclear Blast	Producer, mixing, engineer	March 29, 2019
2018	Carnifex	Bury Me in Blasphemy	EP	Nuclear Blast	Mixing	December 7, 2018
2018	Terrorizer	Caustic Attack	Album	The End Records	Mixing, mastering, engineer	October 12, 2018
2018	Deicide	Overtures of Blasphemy	Album	Century Media	Producer	September 14, 2018
2018	Monstrosity	The Passage of Existence	Album	Metal Blade	Engineer (drums)	September 7, 2018
2017	War of Ages	Alpha	Album	Facedown	Producer, mixing, engineer	December 8, 2017
2017	Belphegor	Totenritual	Album	Nuclear Blast	Mixing	September 15, 2017
2016	Whitechapel	Mark of the Blade	Album	Metal Blade	Engineer (additional)	June 24, 2016
2016	Death Angel	The Evil Divide	Album	Nuclear Blast	Producer	May 27, 2016
2016	Devildriver	Trust No One	Album	Napalm Records	Engineer (additional)	May 13, 2016
2016	Carnifex	Slow Death	Album	Nuclear Blast	Producer, engineer	May 8, 2016
2016	Drowning Pool	Hellelujah	Album	eOne	Producer	May 2, 2016
2015	Cryptopsy	The Book of Suffering – Tome 1	EP	Self Release	Mixing	October 30, 2015
2015	Odd Crew	Mark These Words	Album		Mixing	October 9, 2015
2015	Battlecross	Rise to Power	Album	Metal Blade	Producer, recording, engineer	August 21, 2015
2014	Job for a Cowboy	Sun Eater	Album	Metal Blade	Producer, mixing, engineer	November 11, 2014
2014	Wretched	Cannibal	Album	Victory	Mixing	October 6, 2014
2013	Deicide	In the Minds of Evil	Album	Century Media	Producer, mixing, engineer	November 26, 2013
2013	Reflections	Exi(s)t	Album	eOne, Good Fight	Engineer	October 22, 2013
2013	Death Angel	The Dream Calls for Blood	Album	Nuclear Blast	Producer, guest guitar solo	October 11, 2013
2013	Battlecross	War of Will	Album	Metal Blade	Vocal producer	September 7, 2013
2013	The Black Dahlia Murder	Everblack	Album	Metal Blade	Producer	June 11, 2013
2012	The Defiled	Daggers	Album	Nuclear Blast	Producer	August 5, 2013
2012	Motionless in White	Infamous	Album	Fearless	Producer, mixing	November 13, 2012
2012	The Contortionist	Intrinsic	Album	eOne, Good Fight	Mixing, engineer	July 17, 2012
2012	Chelsea Grin	Evolve	EP	Artery	Producer, mixing	June 19, 2012
2012	Six Feet Under	Undead	Album	Metal Blade	Mixing	May 22, 2012
2012	Firewind	Few Against Many	Album	Century Media	Mixing	May 22, 2012
2012	Job for a Cowboy	Demonocracy	Album	Metal Blade	Producer, mixing, engineer	April 10, 2012
2012	Demon Hunter	True Defiance	Album	Solid State	Mixing	April 10, 2012
2012	God Forbid	Equilibrium	Album	Victory	Producer, engineer	March 26, 2012
2011	Draekon	Prelude To Tragedy	EP	Self Release	Engineer, mix engineer	2011
2011	Carnifex	Until I Feel Nothing	Album	Victory	Mixing	October 24, 2011
2011	Dirge Within	Absolution	EP	Big Time	Mixing	August 16, 2011
2011	Trivium	In Waves	Album	Roadrunner	Pre-production, songwriting	August 2, 2011
2011	August Burns Red	Leveler	Album	Solid State	Producer, mixing	June 21, 2011
2011	The Black Dahlia Murder	Ritual	Album	Metal Blade	Producer	June 17, 2011
2011	Job for a Cowboy	Gloom	EP	Metal Blade	Producer, mixing, engineer	June 7, 2011
2011	Emery	We Do What We Want	Album	Solid State	Mixing	March 29, 2011
2011	Born of Osiris	The Discovery	Album	Sumerian	Mixing	March 22, 2011
2011	The Famine	The Architects of Guilt	Album	Solid State	Mixing	February 15, 2011
2010	As They Sleep	Dynasty	Album	Solid State	Mixing	November 23, 2010
2010	Atheist	Jupiter	Album	Season of Mist	Executive producer, mixing, engineer	November 8, 2010
2010	Dååth	Dååth	Album	Century Media	Vocal producer	October 26, 2010
2010	Death Angel	Relentless Retribution	Album	Nuclear Blast	Producer, mixing, engineer	September 14, 2010
2010	Haste the Day	Attack of the Wolf King	Album	Solid State	Mixing	June 29, 2010
2010	Whitechapel	A New Era of Corruption	Album	Metal Blade	Producer, mixing	June 8, 2010
2010	MyChildren MyBride	Lost Boy	Album	Solid State	Mixing	June 8, 2010
2010	To Speak of Wolves	Myself Is Less Than Letting Go	Album	Solid State	Mixing	May 18, 2010
2010	Demon Hunter	The World Is a Thorn	Album	Solid State	Mixing	March 9, 2010
2010	Mutiny Within	Mutiny Within	Album	Roadrunner	Additional producer, engineer	February 23, 2010
2010	Charred Walls of the Damned	Charred Walls of the Damned	Album	Metal Blade	Producer, engineer, guitarist	February 2, 2010
2009	Evergreen Terrace	Almost Home	Album	Metal Blade	Vocal tracking	September 29, 2009
2009	The Black Dahlia Murder	Deflorate	Album	Metal Blade	Producer	September 15, 2009
2009	Devildriver	Pray for Villains	Album	Roadrunner	Producer, engineer (track 16)	July 14, 2009
2009	August Burns Red	Constellations	Album	Solid State	Producer, mixing	July 14, 2009
2009	Job for a Cowboy	Ruination	Album	Metal Blade	Producer, mixing, engineer	July 7, 2009
2009	The Autumn Offering	Requiem	Album	Victory	Composer, engineer	June 9, 2009
2009	Dååth	The Concealers	Album	Century Media	Producer, mixing, engineer	April 21, 2009
2009	Luna Mortis	The Absence	Album	Century Media	Producer, mixing	February 10, 2009
2008	Beneath the Massacre	Dystopia	Album	Prosthetic	Mixing	October 28, 2008
2008	All That Remains	Overcome	Album	Prosthetic	Producer	September 16, 2008
2008	Devil's Gift	Devil's Gift	Album	John Galt Entertainment	Producer, mixing	September 12, 2008
2008	Kataklysm	Prevail	Album	Nuclear Blast	Mixing, engineer	May 23, 2010
2008	Bury Your Dead	Bury Your Dead	Album	Victory	Producer, mixing, engineer	March 18, 2008
2008	Black Tide	Light From Above	Album	Interscope	Composer	March 18, 2008
2008	Violence To Vegas	Princess to Poison	EP	Feeding Ground	Producer, mixing, engineer	January 22, 2008
2007	The Autumn Offering	Fear Will Cast No Shadow	Album	Victory	Producer, mixing	October 30, 2007
2007	All That Remains	All That Remains: Live	Live Album	Prosthetic	Mixing, engineer	October 30, 2007
2007	The Black Dahlia Murder	Nocturnal	Album	Metal Blade	Producer	September 18, 2007
2007	DevilDriver	The Last Kind Words	Album	Roadrunner	Producer, engineer	July 31, 2007
2007	Sanctity	Road to Bloodshed	Album	Roadrunner	Producer, engineer	April 7, 2007
2007	Chimaira	Resurrection	Album	Ferret	Producer, keyboards, sampling	March 6, 2007
2006	Seemless	What Have We Become	Album	Equal Vision	Producer, engineer	September 5, 2006
2006	Bury Your Dead	Beauty and the Breakdown	Album	Victory	Producer, mixing	July 11, 2006
2006	Trivium	The Crusade	Album	Roadrunner	Producer	October 10, 2006
2006	The Autumn Offering	Embrace the Gutter	Album	Victory	Producer, mixing	May 16, 2006
2006	Failsafe	A Black Tie Affair	EP	Feeding Ground	Producer, mixing, engineer, composer	April 11, 2006
2006	If Hope Dies	Life in Ruin	Album	Metal Blade	Producer, mixing, mastering, engineer	March 7, 2006
2005	Roadrunner United	The All-Star Sessions	Album	Roadrunner	Producer, engineer	October 10, 2005
2005	God Forbid	IV: Constitution of Treason	Album	Century Media	Producer, engineer, programming	September 20, 2005
2005	Neuraxis	Trilateral Progression	Album	Willowtip	Mixing	September 13, 2005
2005	Cannae	Gold Becomes Sacrifice	Album	Prosthetic	Producer, mixing, engineer	September 6, 2005
2005	Trivium	Ascendancy	Album	Roadrunner	Producer	March 15, 2005
2004	Quo Vadis	Defiant Imagination	Album	Skyscraper Music	Mixing (assistant), engineer	November 4, 2004
2004	Crotchduster	Big Fat Box of Shit	Album	Willowtip	Producer, mixing, engineer, composer, guitarist, vocalist	October 5, 2004
2004	Capharnaum	Fractured	Album	Willowtip	Producer, mixing, engineer, composer, guitarist	February 9, 2004
2003	Trivium	Ember to Inferno	Album	Lifeforce	Producer, mixing, engineer	October 14, 2003
2003	Monstrosity	Rise to Power	Album	Conquest	Engineer, guest guitar solo	September 23, 2003
2003	Summon	And the Blood Runs Black	Album	Moribund	Mixing, engineer	February 25, 2003
