= Dragged into the Grave =

Single by Carnifex

from the album Die Without Hope
- Released: January 16, 2014
- Genre: Deathcore
- Length: 3:54
- Label: Nuclear Blast
- Songwriter: Carnifex
- Producer: Mark Lewis

Carnifex singles chronology
"Dead But Dreaming" (2011)	"Dragged into the Grave" (2014)

Lyric Video
- Dragged into the Grave on YouTube

"Dragged into the Grave" is a song by American deathcore band Carnifex. It was released as the first single from their fifth album Die Without Hope through Nuclear Blast Records on January 16, 2014, as a digital release available on iTunes.

== Track listing ==
All lyrics are written by Scott Lewis; all music is composed by Carnifex.

No.	Title	Length
1.	"Dragged into the Grave"	3:54
Total length:		3:54

== Personnel ==
Carnifex

- Scott Lewis – lead vocals
- Jordan Lockrey – lead guitar
- Cory Arford – rhythm guitar, backing vocals
- Fred Calderon – bass
- Shawn Cameron – drums, keyboards
