= Decay (Wretched album) =

Studio album by Wretched
- Released: October 17, 2025
- Recorded: 2024–2025
- Genres: Melodic death metal, technical death metal, deathcore
- Length: 65:00
- Label: Metal Blade
- Producers: Wretched, Joel Moore

Wretched chronology
Cannibal (2014)	Decay (2025)

Professional ratings
Review scores
Source	Rating
Metal Temple	7/10
Metalzone	75%

Decay is the fifth album by American extreme metal band Wretched. It was released on October 17, 2025, through Metal Blade Records. It is their first album in 11 years, due to their temporary split-up after their 2014 album Cannibal, and their first album with vocalist Billy Powers since their 2010 album Beyond the Gate. A music video was released for the title track.

== Track listing ==
No.	Title	Length
1.	"Decay"	5:27
2.	"Malus Incarnate"	3:22
3.	"The Royal Body"	4:54
4.	"The Crimson Sky"	4:57
5.	"Radiance"	4:24
6.	"Clairvoyance"	4:24
7.	"The Mortal Line" (Instrumental)	3:32
8.	"Behind the Glass" (Instrumental)	16:00
9.	"Lights"	4:42
10.	"The Golden Tide"	4:30
11.	"Blackout"	5:05
12.	"The Golden Skyway"	3:43
Total length:		65:00

== Credits ==
Wretched

- Billy Powers – vocals
- Steven Funderburk – guitars
- Andrew Grevey – bass
- Marshall Wieczorek – drums, percussion, executive producer, engineering

Production

- Johann Meyer – mixing
- Alan Douches – mastering
- Travis Smith – art, illustration
