= Odd Crew =

Bulgarian metal band

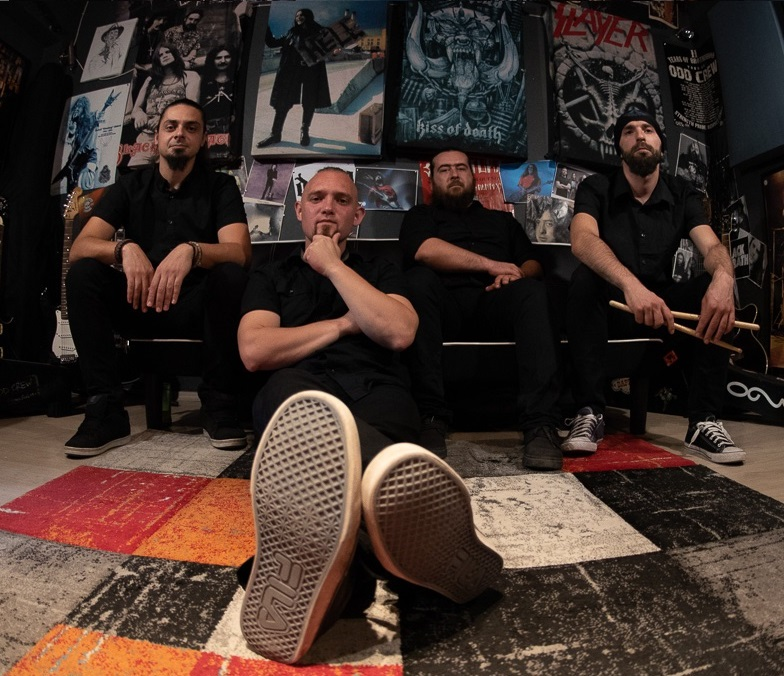
- Odd Crew in 2018

Background information
- Also known as: Kaskadiori (1998–2008)
- Origin: Sofia, Bulgaria
- Genres: Alternative metal; progressive metal; groove metal
- Years active: 1998–present
- Members: Vasko Raykov; Vasil Parvanovski; Martin Stoyanov; Boyan "Bonzy" Georgiev
- Website: oddcrew.net

Odd Crew (formerly known as Kaskadiori) is a Bulgarian metal band from Sofia, formed in 1998. It consists of vocalist Vasko Raykov, guitarist Vasil Parvanovski, bassist Martin Stoyanov and drummer Boyan "Bonzy" Georgiev. The band has released seven studio albums and two live DVDs. Their latest album, Dark Matters Part II, was released in November 2023. The band's original style of thrash/groove metal evolved into a more alternative direction on their later albums.

== History ==
=== Formation ===
In Sofia in 1989, two three-year-olds riding bicycles in their neighborhood accidentally bumped into each other. Both named Vasil, they became friends and together discovered bands such as Black Sabbath and Led Zeppelin. Their shared passion for music and sound inspired them and soon Vasil Parvanovski started playing the guitar and Vasko Raykov began singing and playing the piano.

In 1995, the eight-year-old Parvanovski's classmate Martin Stoyanov joined them. His initial desire was to be the drummer of the band, but this idea quickly vanished as he received a bass guitar as a present from his neighbor. Martin became and remained the bassist of the band to present day.

In 1998, the parents of Vasil Parvanovski took him to visit a family friend, one of the most famous blues performers in Bulgaria, Vasko 'Krupkata' (the 'Patch'). 12-year-old Parvanovski heard hard drumming coming from the basement of the house they were visiting, and that turned out to be the young son of Krupkata, the then eight-year-old Boyan 'Bonzy' Georgiev. Parvanovski was immediately impressed by Bonzy and proposed him to jam with the band.

=== And It's Rock Again (1998–2000) ===
1 August 1998 is the date of the first rehearsal for the four band members which remain unchanged as of today. The band was originally called Kaskadiori ("Stuntmen"). They chose the name because they had a car accident on the way to the studio. One year after their formation, the band recorded its first album, And It's Rock Again, released in the spring of 2000.

=== On the Road and River of Time (2001–2006) ===
In 2001, Kaskadiori joined the blues band of Vasko "The Patch" and toured with him in the next several years. During this period, they continued writing songs and in 2005 they released the album On the Road. In 2006, they released another album called The River of Time.

=== Odd Crew and We Are What We Are (2007–2008) ===
As the members of the band grew up, they started writing heavier songs which quite differed from the past melody rock material. They gradually adopted music as a lifestyle and started using it as way to express themselves and talk to society. At that time, the members of the band decided to substitute their present name (Kaskadiori) with another one which better reflected their new ideas about making music. On 1 August 2008, the band had a concert to celebrate their birthday and announced their new name – Odd Crew. Later that year, Odd Crew released the album We Are What We Are. Suddenly the band attracted a lot of fans who shared their ideas and vision about united society having music as lifestyle.

=== European tour and A Bottle of Friends (2009–2011) ===
In 2009, Odd Crew had already played on every club stage in Bulgaria and went on the 11 Years of Brotherhood tour in various countries around Europe, including Hungary, Germany, Switzerland and England. During the time the band was not on the road, they reconstructed their rehearsal room into a recording studio in order to experiment and improve their sound. Soon, Butcher House studio was built and they recorded another album, A Bottle of Friends, released on 22 October 2010. They also released their first DVD on 29 December.

=== Beyond the Shell (2012) ===
In 2012, Odd Crew released the album Beyond the Shell. It contains 15 tracks, including "Death Trap" and three instrumentals.

=== Mark These Words (2015) ===
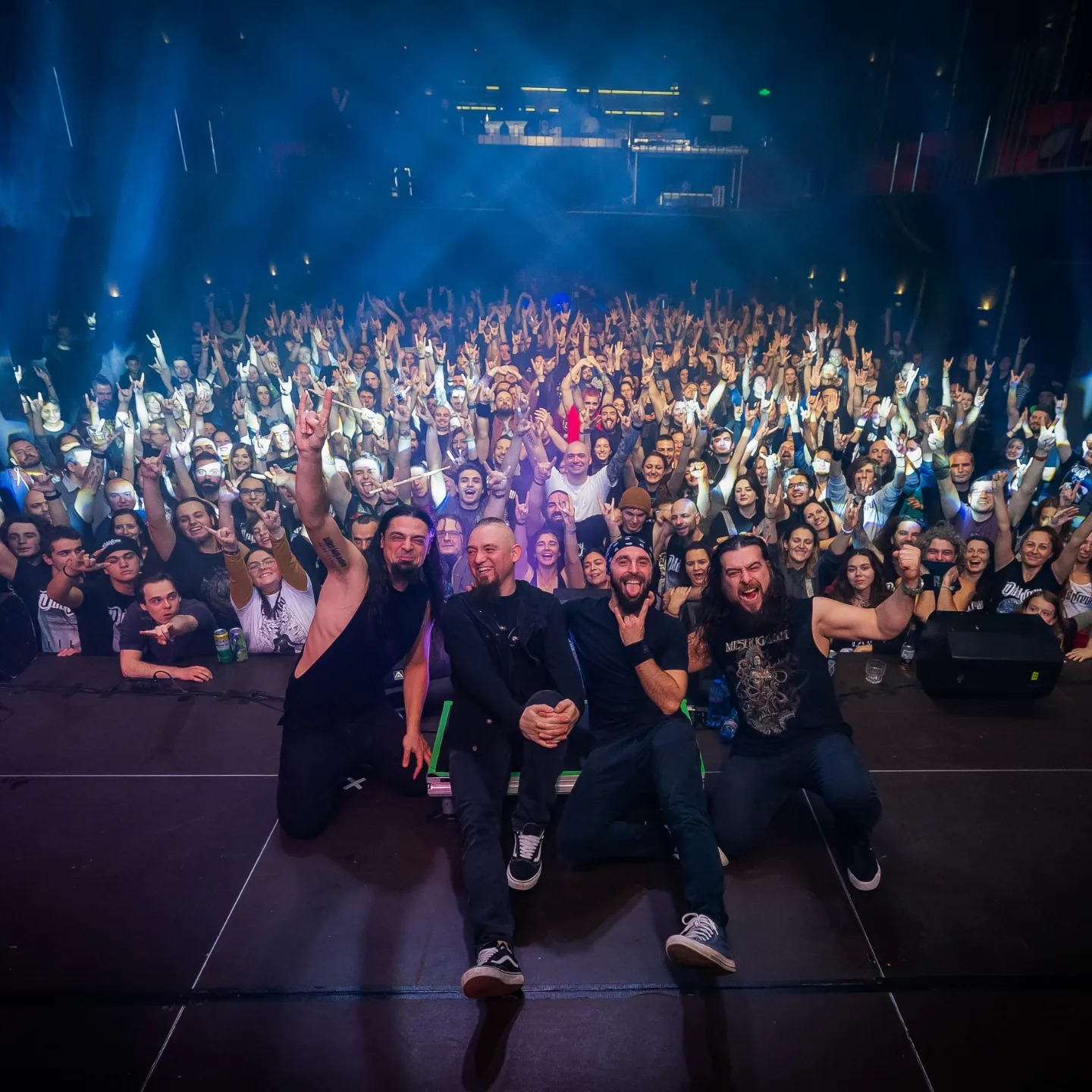
Odd Crew in 2023

On 27 December 2014, the band started a crowdfunding campaign and announced that they were about to record their upcoming album, Mark These Words. Throughout the campaign, they managed to pre-sell over 300 copies of the album. The band recorded the album with Swedish producer Daniel Bergstrand (In Flames, Behemoth, Meshuggah) in Dugout Studios (Uppsala, Sweden) and then sent the tracks to Floridian producer Jason Suecof (Black Dahlia Murder, DevilDriver) for mixing and mastering. The album was released in 2015.

In 2017, the band also released a live DVD, Mark These Words – Live at Hristo Botev Hall.

=== The Lost Pages (2018) ===
On 14 February 2018, the first video, "Same Old Me", was released for the band's new album, directed from Supers4upen Motion Madness. On 19 March 2018, The Lost Pages album was officially released. The album shows a much more lyrical and acoustic sound than the previous studio albums.

=== Dark Matters – Part I (2022) ===
On 24 November 2021, Odd Crew announced that the band signed a record deal with German label Drakkar Entertainment for a worldwide distribution. Shortly after, they also announced a new album, and so Dark Matters – Part I was released on 27 May 2022. The CD was recorded, mixed and mastered in ButcherHouse Studio in Sofia and contains eight songs alongside black and white emotionally shattering videos to all of them. This concept implies the new direction in which the band intends to grow in the future. The record sounds more progressive and doomy, and also more mature and brings Odd Crew's most melodic songwriting tendencies to the fore.

In 2022, the full-length movie Dark Matters – Part I – The Movie aired in theatres in Odd Crew's homeland Bulgaria. It tells the story of the band, the new album and the making of all eight new videos.

Odd Crew announced that they plan a total of four Dark Matters albums.

=== Dark Matters – Part II (2023) ===
In 2023, the band released three videos for Dark Matters – Part II. The album itself was out on 10 November 2023 and contains eight songs, recorded, mixed and mastered at ButcherHouse Studio.

== Band members ==
- Vasko Raykov – lead vocals (1998–present)
- Vasil Parvanovski – guitars and vocals (1998–present)
- Martin Stoyanov – bass and backing vocals (1998–present)
- Boyan "Bonzy" Georgiev – drums (1998–present)

== Discography ==
=== Studio albums ===
Kaskadiori

- And it's Rock Again (2000)
- On the Road (2005)
- The River of Time (2006)

Odd Crew

- We Are What We Are (2008)
- A Bottle of Friends (2010)
- Beyond The Shell (2012)
- Mark These Words (2015)
- The Lost Pages (2018)
- Dark Matters – Part I (2022)
- Dark Matters – Part II (2023)

=== Other releases ===
- A Bottle of Friends (DVD, 2010)
- Live at Hristo Botev Hall (DVD, 2017)
- Dark Matters – Part I – The Movie (documentary, 2022)
