= The Exodus of Autonomy =

Studio album by Wretched
- Released: March 3, 2009
- Recorded: 2008
- Genres: Melodic death metal, metalcore, deathcore, black metal
- Length: 43:40
- Label: Victory
- Producer: Jamie King

Wretched chronology
The Exodus of Autonomy (2009)	Beyond the Gate (2010)

Professional ratings
Review scores
Source	Rating
Blabbermouth.net	5/10
Metalzone	70%

The Exodus of Autonomy is the debut studio album by Wretched, released on March 3, 2009.

== Track listing ==
1. "Shrouded in Filth" (instrumental) – 1:09
2. "Aborning" – 3:39
3. "Before the Rise" – 4:06
4. "A Preservation of Immortality" – 3:43
5. "Fetal Consumption" – 3:18
6. "Mephisto's Will" – 4:13
7. "Deplorable Miscalculations" – 4:41
8. "Final Devourment" – 3:42
9. "VI: The Exodus of Autonomy" (instrumental) – 8:50
10. "VII: The Descent" – 5:00
11. "VIII: Everlasting Damnation" – 1:19

== Personnel ==
Wretched

- Billy Powers – vocals
- John Vail – guitar
- Steven Funderburk – guitar
- David Briggs – bass
- Marshall Wieczorek – drums
