= Hell Chose Me =

Studio album by Carnifex
- Released: February 16, 2010
- Recorded: November 2009
- Studio: Castle Ultimate (Oakland, California)
- Genre: Deathcore; death metal
- Length: 34:33
- Label: Victory
- Producer: Zack Ohren; Carnifex

Carnifex chronology
The Diseased and the Poisoned (2008)	Hell Chose Me (2010)	Until I Feel Nothing (2011)

Singles from Hell Chose Me
- 1. "Hell Chose Me" Released: February 2, 2010

Professional ratings
Review scores
Source	Rating
About.com	3/5 stars
PopMatters	(4/10)

Hell Chose Me is the third studio album by American deathcore band Carnifex, released on February 16, 2010, through Victory Records.

== Background ==
The band started writing and recording the album Hell Chose Me in 2009. Upon its release, the album received positive reception and acclaim for its musical styling, structure, and concepts. Carnifex maintained that this was due to having more time during the writing and recording process than their previous albums.

On January 5, the band uploaded the first single from Hell Chose Me. They began streaming the entire album to the public on February 10, 2010.

On May 28, 2010, the band embarked on a European Tour with supporting acts Veil of Maya and Suffokate beginning in Bochum, Germany and ending on June 19, 2010, at the Summerblast Festival in Trier, Germany. The tour included shows in Spain, France, UK, the Netherlands, Sweden, Slovakia, Hungary, Austria, Italy and Switzerland. The tour was presented by Avocado Booking.

== Track listing ==
All lyrics are written by Scott Lewis; all music is composed by Carnifex.

No.	Title	Length
1.	"Hell Chose Me"	3:32
2.	"Dead Archetype"	2:31
3.	"Entombed Monarch"	3:45
4.	"Names Mean Nothing"	2:59
5.	"Heartless"	4:13
6.	"Sorrowspell"	3:37
7.	"The Scope of Obsession"	2:56
8.	"By Darkness Enslaved"	3:40
9.	"The Liar's Funeral"	3:03
10.	"Genocide Initiative"	4:21
Total length:		34:33

iTunes and vinyl edition bonus tracks
No.	Title	Length
11.	"Angel of Death" (Slayer cover)	4:46
Total length:		39:11

== Personnel ==
Carnifex

- Scott Lewis – vocals
- Ryan Gudmunds – lead guitar
- Cory Arford – rhythm guitar
- Fred Calderon – bass
- Shawn Cameron – drums

Production

- Carnifex – producer
- Zack Ohren – producer, engineer, tracking, mixing, mastering
- Alan Douches – mastering at West West Side Music
- Brent Elliott White – artwork, cover design

== Charts ==
Chart (2010)	Peak position
US Independent Albums (Billboard)	27
US Top Hard Rock Albums (Billboard)	22
US Heatseekers Albums (Billboard)	4
