= World War X =

Studio album by Carnifex
- Released: August 2, 2019
- Studio: Audiohammer Studio, Sanford, Florida
- Genre: Deathcore; atmospheric black metal
- Length: 35:08
- Label: Nuclear Blast
- Producer: Jason Suecof; Carnifex

Carnifex chronology
Slow Death (2016)	World War X (2019)	Graveside Confessions (2021)

Singles from World War X
- 1. "No Light Shall Save Us" Released: June 6, 2019; 2. "World War X" Released: July 4, 2019

World War X is the seventh studio album by American deathcore band Carnifex. It was released on August 2, 2019 through Nuclear Blast. The album was self-produced by the band and Jason Suecof.

== Background and recording ==
On July 5, 2018, Carnifex announced that they were writing new material for the forthcoming album. On January 17, 2019, the band began recording the new album. On June 4, a tease of a new song from their album was posted through their social media accounts. On June 5, Carnifex revealed that Alissa White-Gluz, vocalist of Arch Enemy, would be featuring in their new song. On June 6, they revealed the album itself, album cover, track list, and release date.

== Critical reception ==
Professional ratings
Review scores
Source	Rating
Consequence	B+
Distorted Sound	8/10
MetalSucks	3.5/5 stars
Rock Sins	8/10

The album received positive reviews from critics. Consequence gave the album a positive review and stated: "Overall, World War X is an absolute rush. The band's ability to blend feeling and raw heaviness once again allows them to release a work of awesome brutality. With World War X, Carnifex continue to prove themselves as one of deathcore's leading acts." Sophie Maughan of Distorted Sound scored the album 8 out of 10 and said: "Whether World War X will become known as Carnifex's magnum opus remains to be seen. What they have created with album number seven however, is a record that's undeterred or defined by genre limitations. This is deathcore diversified – and it's an audio-sensory sojourn worth embracing."

MetalSucks rated the album 3.5 out of 5 and said: "Although I can't imagine this will be the defining album of Carnifex's career, it's an accessible one, and longtime Carnifex fans should find something to enjoy." Simon Crampton of Rock Sins rated the album 8 out of 10 and said: "World War X clocks in at just over 35 minutes and flys [sic] by far too quickly. A lean muscular album that packs a hefty punch. Showcasing Carnifex in all of their glory, this a disgustingly heavy record made by a band that has matured and grown from strength with each record who are now starting to reach their full potential. It might be too early to tell if this will go down as Carnifex's defining album, but the evidence is certainly there. The future the band speaks of may be bleak but their real-world counterpart is anything but."

== Track listing ==
Adapted from Apple Music.

No.	Title	Length
1.	"World War X"	4:28
2.	"Visions of the End"	3:30
3.	"This Infernal Darkness"	4:37
4.	"Eyes of the Executioner"	3:02
5.	"No Light Shall Save Us" (featuring Alissa White-Gluz)	4:47
6.	"All Roads Lead to Hell" (featuring Angel Vivaldi)	3:08
7.	"Brushed by the Wings of Demons"	3:55
8.	"Hail Hellfire"	3:10
9.	"By Shadows Thine Held"	4:27
Total length:		35:08

== Personnel ==
Credits adapted from AllMusic.

Carnifex

- Scott Lewis – lead vocals
- Jordan Lockrey – lead guitar, engineering
- Cory Arford – rhythm guitar, backing vocals
- Fred Calderon – bass
- Shawn Cameron – drums, engineering

Additional musicians

- Mick Kenney – additional vocals, programming
- Alissa White-Gluz – guest vocals on track 5
- Angel Vivaldi – guest guitar solo on track 6
- Cassie Morris – piano

Additional personnel

- Jason Suecof – production, engineering, guitar solo
- Carnifex – production
- Ronn Miller – assistant engineering
- John Douglass – mixing
- Ted Jensen – mastering
- Blake Armstrong – cover art
- Marcelo Vasco – layout

== Charts ==
Chart (2019)	Peak position
German Albums (Offizielle Top 100)	93
Swiss Albums (Schweizer Hitparade)	86
US Independent Albums (Billboard)	9
