= Until I Feel Nothing =

Studio album by Carnifex
- Released: October 24, 2011
- Recorded: July 21, 2011 – August 18, 2011
- Genre: Deathcore
- Length: 32:14
- Label: Victory
- Producer: Tim Lambesis, Carnifex

Carnifex chronology
Hell Chose Me (2010)	Until I Feel Nothing (2011)	Die Without Hope (2014)

Singles from Until I Feel Nothing
- 1. "Dead But Dreaming" Released: October 11, 2011

Until I Feel Nothing is the fourth studio album by American deathcore band Carnifex. It was released worldwide on October 24, 2011, through Victory Records. It is the band's last album to feature lead guitarist Ryan Gudmunds.

== Background ==
After the release of the band's 2010 album, Hell Chose Me the band started work on Until I Feel Nothing after their supporting tours for the former. With Hell Chose Me's noticeable advanced shift in style that was ultimately praised by critics, but still having fans of their previous sound, the band decided to create Until I Feel Nothing as a combination of these two sounds.

The album was produced by the band, along with Tim Lambesis, vocalist for As I Lay Dying at his production studio, Lambesis Studios. A music video was produced for the title track and released the same day the album was launched.

== Reception ==
Professional ratings
Review scores
Source	Rating
About.com	3/5 stars
Blabbermouth	7.5/10 stars
Revolver	3/5 stars
Rock Sound	7/10
SMN News	7/10 stars

The album received a mostly positive response from critics. In his review for Blabbermouth, Scott Alisoglu wrote that "these are 10 tracks of smartly composed, relatively distinct, and even memorable tracks of brutal deathcore", noting that this album displayed a particular step forward for the band in terms of songwriting. He noted the songs 'Creation Defaced' and 'Never Forgive Me' "for some compelling arrangements, which often comes down to impacting transitions and various sorts of shading in the guitar work that take equal amounts of death metal's old and new."

Rock Sound's Ryan Bird described the album as "A direct and furious affair", while noting that "A few more layers and the occasional shift in dynamics wouldn't go amiss, but this is an otherwise solid and suitably punishing effort."

== Track listing ==
All lyrics are written by Scott Lewis; all music is composed by Carnifex.

No.	Title	Length
1.	"Deathwish"	1:19
2.	"We Spoke of Lies"	2:56
3.	"A Grave to Blame"	3:38
4.	"Dead But Dreaming"	3:51
5.	"Creation Defaced"	4:14
6.	"Dehumanize"	3:00
7.	"Until I Feel Nothing"	3:51
8.	"Never Forgive Me"	3:04
9.	"Wretched Entropy"	2:50
10.	"Curse My Name"	3:27
Total length:		32:14

== Appearances ==
The title track song has been featured in Rock Band 3 as downloadable content via the Rock Band Network.

== Personnel ==
Carnifex

- Scott Lewis - vocals
- Ryan Gudmunds - lead guitar
- Cory Arford - rhythm guitar
- Fred Calderon - bass
- Shawn Cameron - drums, keyboards

Additional personnel

- Carnifex – producer
- Tim Lambesis – producer
- Daniel Castleman – engineer, tracking
- Fredo Oresto – assistant engineer
- Jason Suecof – mixing at Audio Hammer Studios, Orlando, Florida
- Eyal Levi – mixing
- Alan Douches – mastering at West West Side
- Ashley Jurgemeyer – programming, string arrangement
- Menton3 - Cover art
- Doublej – layout

== Charts ==
Chart (2011)	Peak position
US Independent Albums (Billboard)	43
US Top Hard Rock Albums (Billboard)	12
US Heatseekers Albums (Billboard)	4
US Top Rock Albums (Billboard)	46
