= Son of Perdition (album) =

Studio album by Wretched
- Released: March 27, 2012
- Recorded: January–February 2012
- Studios: Basement Studio, Winston-Salem, North Carolina
- Genres: Deathcore, technical death metal, melodic death metal
- Length: 38:26
- Label: Victory
- Producers: Wretched, Jamie King

Wretched chronology
Beyond the Gate (2010)	Son of Perdition (2012)	Cannibal (2014)

Singles from Son of Perdition
- 1. "Dilated Disappointment" Released: March 13, 2012

Professional ratings
Review scores
Source	Rating
Blabbermouth.net	8/10 stars
Hardrock Haven	8/10 stars
Lambgoat	8/10 stars
What Culture	4/5 stars

Son of Perdition is the third album by the American extreme metal band Wretched. It was released on March 27, 2012. The band released an instrumental music video for "Dilated Disappointment" as a demonstration video for a vocal cover contest.

== Track listing ==
All lyrics are written by Adam Cody; all music is composed by John Vail, Steven Funderburk, Andrew Grevey, and Marshall Wieczorek.

No.	Title	Length
1.	"Oblivion" (Instrumental)	1:29
2.	"Imminent Growth"	5:33
3.	"At the First Sign of Rust"	4:45
4.	"Dilated Disappointment"	2:18
5.	"Repeat... The End Is Near"	3:49
6.	"Dreams of Chaos"	4:38
7.	"The Stellar Sunset of Evolution, Pt. 1 (The Silence)" (Instrumental)	1:50
8.	"The Stellar Sunset of Evolution, Pt. 2 (The Rise)" (Instrumental)	3:34
9.	"The Stellar Sunset of Evolution, Pt. 3 (The Son of Perdition)" (Instrumental)	3:06
10.	"Karma Accomplished"	3:19
11.	"Decimation"	4:10
Total length:		38:26

== Credits ==
Wretched

- Adam Cody – vocals
- John Vail – guitars, choir arrangement on "Oblivion", cello arrangement on "Dreams of Chaos" and "Decimation"
- Steven Funderburk – guitars
- Andrew Grevey – bass
- Marshall Wieczorek – drums, percussion, engineering

Additional musicians

- Jessica Gibbons – choir on "Oblivion"
- Samantha Ward – choir on "Oblivion"
- Lisa Grant – choir on "Oblivion"
- Joanna Harrison – choir on "Oblivion"
- Laura Simpson – choir on "Oblivion"
- Andrew Bozard – choir on "Oblivion"
- Philip Ashley – choir on "Oblivion"
- Shaquile Hester – choir on "Oblivion"
- Zach Burrage-Goodwin – choir on "Oblivion"
- Eugene Ernest Rowell IV – choir on "Oblivion"
- Patrick Dover – choir on "Oblivion"
- Dusan Vukajlovic – cello on "Dreams of Chaos" and "Decimation"
- Mark Husey – organ on "Oblivion"

Production

- Jamie King – engineering, mixing, mastering
- Par Olofsson – artwork
- Doublej – layout
