= Graveside Confessions =

Studio album by Carnifex
- Released: September 3, 2021
- Studio: Back Lounge Studio, San Diego, California
- Genre: Deathcore; symphonic black metal
- Length: 63:11
- Label: Nuclear Blast
- Producer: Mick Kenney; Carnifex

Carnifex chronology
World War X (2019)	Graveside Confessions (2021)	Necromanteum (2023)

Singles from Graveside Confessions
- 1. "Cursed" Released: May 28, 2020; 2. "Dead Bodies Everywhere" Released: April 8, 2021; 3. "Seven Souls" Released: May 14, 2021; 4. "Pray for Peace" Released: June 17, 2021; 5. "Graveside Confessions" Released: July 22, 2021; 6. "Slit Wrist Savior" Released: August 13, 2021

Graveside Confessions is the eighth studio album by American deathcore band Carnifex. It was released on September 3, 2021, through Nuclear Blast. The album was self-produced by the band and Mick Kenney. This is the first and only time since their 2007 debut Dead in My Arms that Carnifex had recorded together as a quartet. Graveside Confessions ends with three re-recorded songs from their debut.

== Background and promotion ==
On May 25, 2020, Carnifex released a teaser for the new song "Cursed". On May 28, the single was out. On April 8, 2021, the band released their cover of Korn' "Dead Bodies Everywhere" on streaming music services. On May 11, a teaser for the new single "Seven Souls" was posted through their social media accounts. On May 14, the single was publicly available.

On June 16, a teaser for the song "Pray for Peace" was released. On June 17, they unveiled the single and its corresponding music video. On July 21, a teaser for the title track was released. On July 22, the group debuted the title track. At the same time, they revealed the album itself, the album cover, the track list, and release date. On August 13, one month before the album release, Carnifex premiered the re-recorded single "Slit Wrist Savior" along with music video.

== Critical reception ==
Professional ratings
Review scores
Source	Rating
Distorted Sound	8/10
Metal Injection	8/10
Metal Storm	7.8/10
Wall of Sound	7.5/10

The album received positive reviews from critics. Graham Ray of Distorted Sound scored the album 8 out of 10 and said: "2021 has already seen a deathcore resurgence with the new age of the genre shining bright, but with Graveside Confessions Carnifex shows that they are still a force to be reckoned with. It's not perfect and there's an argument that they stick too close to a formula but they still deserve their place among the rising talent pool."

Metal Injection rated the album 8 out of 10 and stated, "As we see Whitechapel likely reaching the peak of their character arc in their upcoming album, I feel Carnifex also parallels such stylistic maturation here on Graveside Confessions. Longtime devoted fans will certainly admire this record, yet I hope that those who wrote off this band due to their original presence in deathcore scene will give this record a shot and realize that Carnifex are back with a fresh coat of paint. There's some serious bangers and exploration here, so I hope they can garner an even further experimental and forward-thinking mentality in their next demonic blackened deathcore release."

Wall of Sound gave the album a score 7.5/10 and saying: "Graveside Confessions is an enjoyably punishing release from Carnifex. It's clear that the band wanted to create the best music possible within their mould, rather than try to push out the boundaries – and there is absolutely nothing wrong with that, and long time fans will not be disappointed with this album. This style of material has become the bread and butter of their career; a fusion of various classic extreme metal sub-genres melded into their own modern niche. Graveside Confessions serves as a reminder that Carnifex are one of the strongest and consistent groups to come out the mid-00s deathcore scene. Where others have fallen or moved away, Carnifex stand strong."

== Track listing ==
Adapted from Apple Music.

Graveside Confessions track listing
No.	Title	Length
1.	"Graveside Confessions"	4:28
2.	"Pray for Peace"	4:54
3.	"Seven Souls"	4:43
4.	"Cursed"	5:21
5.	"Carry Us Away"	4:38
6.	"Talk to the Dead"	4:06
7.	"January Nights"	3:46
8.	"Cemetery Wander"	3:51
9.	"Countess of Perpetual Torment"	4:38
10.	"Dead Bodies Everywhere" (Korn cover)	4:30
11.	"Cold Dead Summer"	4:00
12.	"Alive for the Last Time"	2:58

Re-recorded songs from Dead in My Arms
No.	Title	Length
13.	"Collaborating Like Killers"	3:53
14.	"My Heart in Atrophy"	3:04
15.	"Slit Wrist Savior"	4:21
Total length:		63:11

== Personnel ==
Credits adapted from AllMusic.

Carnifex

- Scott Lewis – lead vocals
- Cory Arford – guitars, backing vocals
- Fred Calderon – bass
- Shawn Cameron – drums, engineering

Additional musicians

- Neal Tiemann – guitars

Additional personnel

- Mick Kenney – production, mixing, mastering, programming
- Carnifex – production
- Godmachine – artwork
- AJ Loeb – layout
- Ivy D' Muerta – photography
