= The Diseased and the Poisoned =

Studio album by Carnifex
- Released: June 24, 2008
- Recorded: Planet Z Studios
- Genre: Deathcore
- Length: 33:16
- Label: Victory
- Producer: Chris "Zeuss" Harris

Carnifex chronology
Dead in My Arms (2007)	The Diseased and the Poisoned (2008)	Hell Chose Me (2010)

Singles from The Diseased and the Poisoned
- 1. "Adornment of the Sickened" Released: June 10, 2008

Professional ratings
Review scores
Source	Rating
AbsolutePunk.net	67%
Blogcritics	2.5/5 stars
Rock in Review	3.5/5 stars

The Diseased and the Poisoned is the second studio album by American deathcore band Carnifex. It was made in 2008 and was released on June 24 of the same year. The song "Adornment of the Sickened" was released as Carnifex's first single.

== Track listing ==
All lyrics are written by Scott Lewis; all music is composed by Carnifex.

No.	Title	Length
1.	"Suffering"	0:50
2.	"In Coalesce with Filth and Faith"	3:16
3.	"The Nature of Depravity"	3:16
4.	"Adornment of the Sickened"	2:27
5.	"Innocence Died Screaming"	2:45
6.	"The Diseased and the Poisoned"	2:37
7.	"To My Dead and Dark Dreams"	3:10
8.	"Sadistic Embrace"	2:54
9.	"Answers in Mourning"	2:46
10.	"Aortic Dissection"	2:58
11.	"Among Grim Shadows"	2:46
12.	"Enthroned in Isolation"	3:30
Total length:		33:16

== Personnel ==
Carnifex

- Scott Lewis – vocals
- Ryan Gudmunds – lead guitar
- Cory Arford – rhythm guitar
- Fred Calderon – bass
- Shawn Cameron – drums, keyboards

Production

- Produced by Chris "Zeuss" Harris and Carnifex
- Tracked, engineered and mixed by Chris "Zeuss" Harris
- Mastered by Alan Douches at West West Side Music
- Layout by Mike Milford and DoubleJ
