= The Autumn Offering (album) =

Studio album by The Autumn Offering
- Released: August 31, 2010
- Recorded: April 1 – June 4, 2010
- Genre: Melodic death metal, deathcore
- Length: 36:55
- Label: Victory
- Producer: Pete Rutcho, The Autumn Offering

The Autumn Offering chronology
Requiem (2009)	The Autumn Offering (2010)

Singles from The Autumn Offering
- 1. "Born Dead" Released: August 17, 2010

Professional ratings
Review scores
Source	Rating
Alternative Press	3.5/5 stars
Rock Sound	(7/10)

The Autumn Offering is the fifth and final studio album by American metal band The Autumn Offering. The album was released on August 31, 2010 through Victory Records. The Autumn Offering is the first release from the band to feature former Scum of the Earth and Silent Civilian guitarist Jesse Nunn, and bassist Carl Bensley.

On July 20, 2010 The Autumn Offering uploaded the track "Born Dead" to their MySpace. The band also recorded a music video for the track with director Eric Richter.

== Track listing ==
All tracks are written by Tommy Church, Matt McChesney, Jesse Nunn and Brian Sculley.

No.	Title	Length
1.	"Cotton Shooter"	0:34
2.	"Synapse"	2:53
3.	"Born Dead"	3:55
4.	"Exhale the Locusts"	4:00
5.	"Fed to the Lions"	4:27
6.	"Hessian Blade"	3:24
7.	"Death Mask"	3:30
8.	"Viral"	3:15
9.	"Among Wolves"	2:55
10.	"Bloodlust"	4:01
11.	"Myriad Black"	4:01
Total length:		36:55

== Personnel ==
The Autumn Offering

- Carl Bensley – bass
- Tommy Church – rhythm guitar
- Matt McChesney – vocals, art direction
- Jesse Nunn – lead guitar, art direction
- Brian Sculley – drums

Additional

- Pete Rutcho – production, mixing, mastering, engineer, additional guitar
- The Autumn Offering – production
- Double J – layout
- Derek Guidry – illustrations
- John Finberg – booking
