= Cannibal (Wretched album) =

Studio album by Wretched
- Released: June 10, 2014
- Recorded: February 2014
- Studios: Metamorphosis Studios, Weddington, North Carolina
- Genres: Melodic death metal, technical death metal, deathcore
- Length: 44:16
- Label: Victory
- Producers: Wretched, Joel Moore

Wretched chronology
Son of Perdition (2012)	Cannibal (2014)	Decay (2025)

Professional ratings
Review scores
Source	Rating
Ghost Cult Magazine	7/10
Metal Temple	10/10
MetalSucks	3/5 stars

Cannibal is the fourth album by American extreme metal band Wretched. It was released on June 10, 2014, through Victory Records. The album features former guitarist John Vail, who plays a guitar solo on the song "Engulfed in Lethargy". It is the band's final album to feature vocalist Adam Cody before his departure in 2023.

== Track listing ==
All lyrics are written by Adam Cody.

No.	Title	Music	Length
1.	"Gold Above Me"	Joel Moore	1:27
2.	"Morsel"	Moore, Steven Funderburk	4:06
3.	"Calloused"	Moore, Funderburk	3:32
4.	"Thin Skinned"	Moore, Funderburk	4:05
5.	"L'appel du Vide" (Instrumental)	Moore	1:42
6.	"Cranial Infestation"	Moore, Funderburk, Andrew Grevey, Marshall Wieczorek	3:32
7.	"Salt Lick"	Moore	3:42
8.	"Cannibal" (Instrumental)	Moore	7:30
9.	"Wetiko"	Moore	4:12
10.	"To the Flies"	Moore	5:45
11.	"Engulfed in Lethargy"	Moore	4:43
Total length:			44:16

== Credits ==
Wretched

- Adam Cody – vocals
- Joel Moore – guitars, production, engineering
- Steven Funderburk – guitars
- Andrew Grevey – bass
- Marshall Wieczorek – drums, percussion, executive producer, engineering

Additional musicians

- John Vail – guitar solo on "Engulfed in Lethargy"

Production

- Jason Suecof – mixing
- Alan Douches – mastering
- Raf the Might – art, illustration
- Randy Pfeil – layout
- Daniel Clark Cunningham – photography
