= The Autumn Offering =

American metalcore band

Background information
- Origin: Daytona Beach, Florida, U.S.
- Genres: Metalcore, melodic death metal
- Years active: 1999–2010
- Labels: Stillborn, Victory
- Past members: Matt McChesney; Tommy Church; Brain Sculley; Jesse Nunn; Carl Bensley; George Moore; Tony Cesaro; Matt Johnson; Mike Bortle; Nick Gelyon; Dennis Miller; Sean Robbins; Mike Poggione
- Website: www.zipperspalace.com/tao

The Autumn Offering was an American metalcore band that formed in Daytona Beach, Florida, in 1999. After achieving some degree of local success, the band was signed to Stillborn Records, founded by Jamey Jasta of Hatebreed, in 2003. The band released one album through this label. The Autumn Offering later signed to Victory Records in 2005 and released four studio albums before ceasing activity in 2010.

Loudwire compared them to As I Lay Dying and Killswitch Engage.

== History ==
=== Formation and debut album (1999–2004) ===
The Autumn Offering was formed in 1999 while all the members were still in high school and by 2003, they had completed several regional tours and self-booked US tours. Hatebreed vocalist Jamey Jasta took notice of the band, and signed them to his own Stillborn Records in December 2003. The Autumn Offering released their debut album Revelations of the Unsung on July 27, 2004, through Stillborn and was recorded by Chris Harris, also known as Zeuss at Planet-Z.

=== Signing to Victory Records and second album (2005–2006) ===
In 2005, founding member and lead guitarist George Moore parted ways with the band and was soon after replaced by Tommy Church, guitarist from End of All, which later became known as Killwhitneydead. The Autumn Offering signed to Victory Records in September 2005. Their first release through the label was a reissue of their debut album in early 2006, which was followed by their second studio album Embrace the Gutter on May 16, 2006. Embrace the Gutter was recorded with Jason Suecof (Chimaira, Trivium) at Audiohammer Studios.

=== New vocalist and Fear Will Cast No Shadow (2007–2008) ===
After completing Embrace the Gutter and a few national tours, singer Dennis Miller quit the band to pursue a normal life. The band continued on and eventually chose good touring friend Matt McChesney from Hell Within to replace him. The band also separated with original drummer Nick Gelyon in the studio during the recording of Embrace the Gutter. He was replaced by Brian Sculley soon after.

The band's next album, Fear Will Cast No Shadow was released on October 30, 2007, with new singer Matt McChesney. The album featured a slight change in sound for the band, having a more melodic sound and using more clean vocals than on previous releases.

=== Requiem (2009) ===
The Autumn Offering entered the studio on February 1, 2009, to begin recording Requiem at AudioHammer Studios with Mark Lewis. Recording was finished by March 2009, and the album was later released on June 9, 2009, through Victory Records. A music video for the song "The Curtain Hits the Cast" from Requiem was released.

For the band's fourth studio album, The Autumn Offering took their music in a heavier direction contrasting the more pop and melody driven Fear Will Cast No Shadow. The album was described by the band as a more "mature" album featuring "longer songs, complex rhythms, and dynamic vocals." Further distancing themselves from their previous album, vocalist Matt McChesney wrote darker lyrics about substance abuse and being raised in a broken home, as opposed to songs about relationships. The song "Narcosis" is about McChesney's experience of being revived with an adrenaline shot after snorting heroin and cocaine at the same time.

Requiem became The Autumn Offering's first charting album, peaking at number 36 on Billboard's Top Heatseekers chart.

=== The Autumn Offering (2010) ===
For the band's fifth studio album, The Autumn Offering recruited two members: guitarist Jesse Nunn of Silent Civilian and Scum of the Earth who replaced Matt Johnson, and bassist Carl Bensley of Instinct of Aggression who replaced Mike Poggione.

The Autumn Offering was released on August 31, 2010, through Victory Records. The album featured another stylistic change for the band, this time going into a more melodic death metal and deathcore direction. Late that year, following the departure of guitarist Tommy Church, vocalist Matt McChesney stated that the band would be ending, citing burn out and "a million other things."

== Band members ==
Final lineup

- Carl Bensley – bass guitar (2010)
- Tommy Church – guitars (2005–2010) (ex-Mushroomhead)
- Matt McChesney – vocals (2007–2010) (ex-Hell Within)
- Jesse Nunn (Saint) – guitars (2010)
- Brian Sculley – drums (2008–2010)

Former

- Tony Cesaro – guitars (1999–2002)
- Mike Bortle – drums (1999–2003)
- George Moore – guitars (1999–2005)
- Dennis Miller – vocals (1999–2007)
- Nick Gelyon – drums (2003–2007)
- Jonathon Lee – drums (2007)
- Allen Royal – drums (2007-2008)
- Sean Robbins – bass guitar (1999–2008)
- Mike Poggione – bass guitar, vocals (2008–2009)
- Erik Tisinger - bass guitar (2009)
- Matt Johnson – guitars (2002–2010)

Timeline

== Discography ==
Studio albums

- Revelations of the Unsung (2004)
- Embrace the Gutter (2006)
- Fear Will Cast No Shadow (2007)
- Requiem (2009)
- The Autumn Offering (2010)

== Music videos ==
Year	Song	Director	Album
2004	"Revelation"		Revelations of the Unsung
2006	"Embrace the Gutter"	Dale Resteghini	Embrace the Gutter
2007	"From Atrophy to Obsession"	Noah Shulman	Fear Will Cast No Shadow
2008	"Silence and Goodbye"	Noah Shulman	Fear Will Cast No Shadow
2009	"The Curtain Hits the Cast"		Requiem
2010	"Born Dead"	Eric Richter	The Autumn Offering
