= Love Lies in Ashes =

EP by Carnifex
- Released: March 13, 2007
- Recorded: 2006
- Genre: Deathcore
- Length: 15:24
- Label: Acropolisrpm Records

Carnifex chronology
Hope Dies with a Decadent (2006)	Love Lies in Ashes (2007)	Dead in My Arms (2007)

Love Lies in Ashes is the first EP by American deathcore band Carnifex. The EP was recorded in 2006 and was released on March 13, 2007, through Acropolisrpm Records.

== Track listing ==
All tracks are written by Carnifex

No.	Title	Length
1.	"Collaborating Like Killers"	4:01
2.	"Love Lies in Ashes"	3:45
3.	"Slit Wrist Savior"	4:25
4.	"Hope Dies with the Decadent"	3:53
Total length:		15:24

== Personnel ==
Carnifex

- Scott Lewis – vocals
- Travis Whiting – guitars
- Steve McMahon – bass
- Shawn Cameron – drums
