= Necromanteum =

Studio album by Carnifex
- Released: October 6, 2023
- Genres: Deathcore; symphonic black metal
- Length: 42:22
- Label: Nuclear Blast
- Producers: Jason Suecof; Scott Lewis; Shawn Cameron

Carnifex chronology
Graveside Confessions (2021)	Necromanteum (2023)	More Than Misery (2026)

Singles from Necromanteum
- 1. "Necromanteum" Released: July 6, 2023; 2. "Death's Forgotten Children" Released: August 25, 2023

Necromanteum is the ninth studio album by American deathcore band Carnifex. It was released on October 6, 2023, through Nuclear Blast. The album was produced by Jason Suecof, Scott Lewis and Shawn Cameron. This is the first album to feature lead guitarist Neal Tiemann.

== Background and promotion ==
On February 3, 2023, Carnifex announced through social media that they are winding down writing sessions for their ninth studio album. According to the vocalist Scott Lewis, the group would be entering the studio on February 15 to begin tracking it with producer Jason Suecof manning the boards. On July 6, the band released the lead single and title track "Necromanteum" and an accompanying music video. At the same time, they officially announced the album itself and release date, whilst also revealing the album cover and the track list.

On August 25, one month before the album release, the band unveiled the second single "Death's Forgotten Children" featuring Tom Barber of Chelsea Grin.

A music video for the track "Torn in Two" was released on January 25, 2024.

== Critical reception ==
Professional ratings
Review scores
Source	Rating
Distorted Sound	8/10
Rock Sins	8/10
Wall of Sound	9/10

The album received positive reviews from critics. Rich Webb of Distorted Sound scored the album 8 out of 10 and said: "There are some who criticise bands for staying their course and re-treading the same ground. However, with a group like Carnifex, each time they venture out they manage to make things sound fresh and exciting without straying too far from their tried and tested formula. Necromanteum is a marked improvement on the band's previous effort Graveside Confessions, which was by no means a poor album, but felt like it ran a little too long and dragged a bit towards the end. It's safe to say that Carnifex sound like more of a complete unit this time around and the addition of another creative songwriter to the mix has done the lads wonders." Simon Crampton of Rock Sins rated the album 8 out of 10 and said: "In a completely stacked year for death metal releases Carnifex have come out swinging, with a career best album that shows they still have a lot of life left in them yet, and they are still prepared to throwdown with the best of them."

Wall of Sound gave the album a score 9/10 and saying: "An improvement on 2021's Graveside Confessions, Necromanteum ranks amongst the most satisfying releases in Carnifex's back catalogue. A band whose albums feel generally too top heavy, with the finest material loaded at the front, this ninth full length is arguably Carnifex's most consistent record to date, and will undoubtedly be a major success amongst their fanbase. Necromanteum is an excellent, inspired sounding effort, and as Carnifex nears two decades in the game, serves as a testament to a group who are hungry to run with their peers and school the multitude of acts they've influenced."

== Track listing ==
Adapted from Apple Music.

Necromanteum track listing
No.	Title	Length
1.	"Torn in Two"	3:52
2.	"Death's Forgotten Children" (featuring Tom Barber of Chelsea Grin)	4:10
3.	"Necromanteum"	4:26
4.	"Crowned in Everblack"	4:34
5.	"The Pathless Forest"	4:00
6.	"How the Knife Gets Twisted"	3:50
7.	"Architect of Misanthropy"	5:05
8.	"Infinite Night Terror"	4:00
9.	"Bleed More"	4:17
10.	"Heaven and Hell All at Once"	4:02
Total length:		42:22

== Personnel ==
Carnifex

- Scott Lewis – lead vocals
- Neal Tiemann – lead guitar
- Cory Arford – rhythm guitar, backing vocals
- Fred Calderon – bass
- Shawn Cameron – drums

Additional musicians

- Tom Barber – guest vocals on track 2

Additional personnel

- Shawn Cameron – production, vocal recording
- Scott Lewis – production
- Jason Suecof – production, engineering, mixing, recording
- Ronn Miller – assistant engineering
- Evan Sammons – additional engineering
- Mark Lewis – mastering
- Spencer Creaghan – orchestral and choir arrangements
