= All That Remains: Live =

LIVE

Video album by All That Remains
- Released: October 30, 2007
- Recorded: Audiohammer Studios in Sanford, Florida
- Genre: Metalcore, melodic death metal
- Length: 43:07 (CD)
- Label: Prosthetic
- Producer: Jason Suecof

All That Remains chronology
The Fall of Ideals (2006)	LIVE (2007)	Overcome (2008)

Professional ratings
Review scores
Source	Rating
Blistering	(positive)

LIVE (All That Remains: Live) is a DVD released by the American heavy metal band All That Remains. It was released October 30, 2007. The Philadelphia show was recorded in February 2007, with the Baltimore show being recorded on July 12, 2007.

== Track listing ==
Live in Baltimore
No.	Title	Length
1.	"Intro"	1:04
2.	"Pre-Show"	1:39
3.	"Become the Catalyst"	3:22
4.	"This Darkened Heart"	3:20
5.	"The Air That I Breathe"	3:47
6.	"Six"	3:40
7.	"For Salvation"	3:42
8.	"Tattered On My Sleeve"	4:16
9.	"The Weak Willed"	3:27
10.	"Not Alone"	3:28
11.	"It Dwells in Me"	4:02
12.	"Focus Shall Not Fail"	5:10
13.	"Indictment"	3:47
14.	"This Calling"	4:01
15.	"Credits"	4:07

Live in Philadelphia
No.	Title	Length
1.	"Intro"	0:38
2.	"Become the Catalyst"	3:16
3.	"This Darkened Heart"	3:19
4.	"Six"	4:38
5.	"Not Alone"	3:25
6.	"It Dwells in Me"	3:02
7.	"For Salvation"	3:54
8.	"Tattered On My Sleeve"	3:40
9.	"Regret Not"	2:11
10.	"We Stand"	4:04
11.	"Indictment"	5:38

Extra footage
No.	Title	Length
1.	"ATR Fans"	3:52
2.	"Guitar Hero II (Oli vs. Mike)"	2:07
3.	"History"	7:15
4.	"Q&A with All That Remains"	2:52
5.	"Life On the Tour Bus"	1:58
6.	"ATR Autograph Session"	2:47

Music videos
No.	Title	Length
1.	"The Air That I Breathe"	3:36
2.	"Behind the Scenes of 'The Air That I Breathe'"	10:30
3.	"This Calling"	3:39
4.	"Tattered On My Sleeve"	4:19
5.	"This Darkened Heart"	3:34
6.	"The Deepest Gray"	3:05
7.	"Not Alone"	3:30

Photos
No.	Title	Length
1.	"Slideshow #1"	3:22
2.	"Slideshow #2"	3:50

== Personnel ==
- Philip Labonte – lead vocals
- Oli Herbert – lead guitar
- Mike Martin – rhythm guitar
- Jeanne Sagan – bass guitar, backing vocals
- Jason Costa – drums
