= Capharnaum (band) =

American technical death metal band

- Origin: Avon, Connecticut, U.S.
- Genres: Technical death metal
- Years active: 1993–1999, 2003–2009
- Label: Willowtip Records
- Past members: Jason Suecof; Jordan Suecof; Mike Poggione; Matt Heafy; Alex Vieira

Capharnaum was an American technical death metal band from Sanford, Florida, formed by brothers Jason and Jordan Suecof.

== History ==
Capharnaum was founded in 1993 by Jason and Jordan Suecof, who are the only continuous members of the band. The band was originally from Avon, Connecticut but moved to Sanford, Florida after their breakup in 1999. In 1997, the band released their debut album, Reality Only Fantasized. A year later, they recorded the Plague of Spirits demo. In 2004, they released Fractured, which was recorded at Jason Suecof's Audio Hammer Studios, on Willowtip Records.

== Members ==
Last lineup

- Jason Suecof – guitars (1993–1999, 2003–2009)
- Jordan Suecof – drums (1993–1999, 2003–2009)
- Mike Poggione – bass (2003–2009)
- Matt Heafy – vocals (2003–2009)
- Alex Vieira – guitars (2004–2009)

Former members

- Frank Vega – vocals (1993–1995)
- Tony Espinoza – vocals (1995–1999)
- Ryan Adams – guitars (1995–1997)
- Daniel Mongrain – guitars (2003–2004)
- Andy Dickins – bass (1993–1997)
- Shawn Greenlaw – bass (1997–1999)
- Kevin Schremmer – guitars (1997–1999)

== Discography ==
Studio albums

- Reality Only Fantasized (1997)
- Fractured (2004)

Demo

- Plague of Spirits (1999)
