= Revelations of the Unsung =

Studio album by The Autumn Offering
- Released: July 27, 2004 (original release); January 10, 2006 (re-release)
- Genre: Melodic metalcore
- Length: 38:17
- Labels: Stillborn (original release); Victory (re-release)
- Producers: The Autumn Offering; Chris "Zeuss" Harris

The Autumn Offering chronology
Revelations of the Unsung (2004)	Embrace the Gutter (2006)

Professional ratings
Review scores
Source	Rating
AllMusic	3.5/5 stars
Lambgoat	7/10
Punknews.org	3/5 stars

Revelations of the Unsung is the debut album by Florida metal band The Autumn Offering. It was released in 2004 through Stillborn Records and re-released in 2006 through Victory Records. Due to popularity with signing to Victory Records, since its conception, Revelations of the Unsung has sold in excess of 20,000 CDs.

A music video was made for the song "Revelation".

== Track listing ==
All music is composed by The Autumn Offering.

No.	Title	Lyrics	Length
1.	"The Great Escape"	Miller, Moore	2:22
2.	"Revelation"	Moore	5:04
3.	"Calm After the Storm"	Moore	2:34
4.	"Last Desperado"	Miller	3:12
5.	"Deflowered"	Moore	3:35
6.	"Doomed Generation"	Moore	3:42
7.	"Homecoming" (featuring Philip Labonte of All That Remains)	Miller, Moore	4:16
8.	"Bonds in Which We Break"	Miller	3:33
9.	"Shadows of Betrayal"	Miller	5:33
10.	"Beginning's End"	Miller	4:22

== Personnel ==
The Autumn Offering

- Dennis Miller - vocals
- George Moore - lead/rhythm guitars, vocals
- Sean Robbins - bass guitar
- Matt Johnson - rhythm/lead guitars
- Nick Gelyon - drums

Additional personnel

- Zeuss Ball - engineering, mixing
- Aaron Marsh - additional imagery, art direction
- Philip Labonte - additional vocals on "Homecoming"
- Matt Deis - keyboards on "Revelation"
