= Dead in My Arms =

Studio album by Carnifex
- Released: July 12, 2007
- Recorded: 2007
- Genre: Deathcore
- Length: 33:15
- Labels: This City Is Burning, Uprising
- Producer: Chris "Zeuss" Harris

Carnifex chronology
Love Lies in Ashes (2006)	Dead in My Arms (2007)	The Diseased and the Poisoned (2008)

Dead in My Arms is the debut studio album by American deathcore band Carnifex. It was released on July 12, 2007, through This City Is Burning Records. It is the band's only album with bassist Steve McMahon, as he left shortly after the album's release, and was replaced by Fred Calderon, who has played on all of Carnifex's albums since then. It was also the band's only album recorded as quartet until the release of Graveside Confessions in 2021.

The album is released as both a jewel case and a digipak. The jewel case version of the album is rarer than the digipak.

In 2020, Metal Hammer included the album in their list of "10 essential Deathcore albums". In 2021, Alternative Press included the album in the site's list of "30 deathcore albums from the 2000s that define the genre".

== Background ==
Carnifex were briefly signed to This City Is Burning in 2007, during so the group wrote and recorded Dead in My Arms during the proceeding months. Upon the album's release in June 2007, it managed to sell over 5,000 copies in its first week despite very limited publicity. After its release, the sales of the album more than doubled amongst the summer of that year. "Collaborating Like Killers", "Love Lies in Ashes" "Slit Wrist Savior" and "Hope Dies with the Decadent" were re-recorded tracks that had previously been included on the band's first EP, Love Lies in Ashes.

The original distributed versions of the album sold on iTunes and copies at the band's concerts had the song "These Thoughts Become Cages" missing due to a marketing idea from This City Is Burning Records who placed the song only on the store bought versions of the album.

The same version that includes the "These Thoughts Become Cages" track, also features enhanced content on the disc and includes the controversial music video for "Lie to My Face" along with other extras.

In celebration for the 15th anniversary of the album, the band would re-recorded "Lie To My Face" with Adam Warren from Oceano and release it on July 12, 2022.

== Reception ==
Metal Hammer described the album's music as "brutal yet accessible" and described the lyrics as "surprisingly relatable."

== Track listing ==
No.	Title	Length
1.	"Intro"	0:41
2.	"These Thoughts Became Cages"	2:51
3.	"Slit Wrist Savior"	4:15
4.	"Hope Dies with the Decadent"	3:51
5.	"Lie to My Face"	3:02
6.	"Love Lies in Ashes"	3:43
7.	"A Winter in Remorse"	3:02
8.	"Collaborating Like Killers"	3:54
9.	"My Heart in Atrophy"	3:00
10.	"Dead in My Eyes"	1:39
11.	"Dead in My Arms"	3:26
Total length:		33:15

== Personnel ==
Carnifex

- Scott Lewis – vocals
- Cory Arford – guitars
- Steve McMahon – bass
- Shawn Cameron – drums, keyboards

Production

- Produced by Chris "Zeuss" Harris
- Mixed and mastered by Dave Swanson
