= Embrace the Gutter =

Studio album by The Autumn Offering
- Released: May 16, 2006
- Studios: Audiohammer Studios, Sanford, Florida; Eastern Sky Studios, Casselberry, Florida
- Genre: Melodic metalcore
- Length: 35:13
- Label: Victory
- Producer: Jason Suecof

The Autumn Offering chronology
Revelations of the Unsung (2004)	Embrace the Gutter (2006)	Fear Will Cast No Shadow (2007)

Professional ratings
Review scores
Source	Rating
AllMusic	3.5/5 stars

Embrace the Gutter is the second studio album by Florida metal band The Autumn Offering. It is the last album to feature original vocalist Dennis Miller and original bassist Sean Robbins. After extensive touring alongside bands SOiL and Mushroomhead, The Autumn Offering's second full-length feature has been said to have sold over 15,000 copies in the U.S.

== Track listing ==
No.	Title	Lyrics	Music	Length
1.	"Prologue"	Instrumental	Church	0:34
2.	"Decay"	Dennis Miller, Nick Gelyon	Tommy Church	3:10
3.	"The Yearning"	Miller, Gelyon, Church	Church	3:40
4.	"Embrace the Gutter" (featuring Jason Suecof)	Miller, Gelyon, Sean Robbins	Church	3:56
5.	"Ghost"	Miller, Church	Church, Robbins, Matt Johnson	4:02
6.	"Misery"	Miller, Church	Church	3:20
7.	"This Future Disease"	Miller, Gelyon, Church	Church	3:11
8.	"One Last Thrill"	Church	Church	4:08
9.	"No End in Sight"	Miller, Robbins	Johnson, Church	3:32
10.	"Walk the Line"	Miller, Church	Johnson, Church	2:19
11.	"The Final Cut"	Instrumental	Johnson	3:21
Total length:				35:13

== Personnel ==
The Autumn Offering

- Dennis Miller – vocals
- Tommy Church – guitars
- Sean Robbins – bass guitar, photography
- Matt Johnson – guitars
- Nick Gelyon – drums

Additional

- Jason Suecof – engineering, mixing, additional vocals and solo on "Embrace the Gutter"
- Mark Lewis – engineering, mixing
- Tom Morris – mastering
- Double J – layout, design
