= Requiem (The Autumn Offering album) =

Studio album by The Autumn Offering
- Released: June 9, 2009
- Genre: Metalcore
- Length: 37:36
- Label: Victory
- Producer: Mark Lewis

The Autumn Offering chronology
Fear Will Cast No Shadow (2007)	Requiem (2009)	The Autumn Offering (2010)

Singles from Requiem
- 1. "The Curtain Hits the Cast" Released: May 19, 2009

Professional ratings
Review scores
Source	Rating
AllMusic	2.5/5 stars
Blabbermouth.net	4.5/10

Requiem is the fourth album by Florida metal band The Autumn Offering. It was released on June 9, 2009 through Victory Records. This is the last album to feature any of the original members as Matt Johnson quit the band in 2010. According to the group, the album contains "by far the band's most ambitious and dense material yet. Longer songs, complex rhythms, and dynamic vocals fill out this 11-track monster."

In April 2009, vocalist Matt McChesney gave the website MetalSucks a preview of Requiem. After previously giving The Autumn Offering's 2007 release Fear Will Cast No Shadow a very negative review, Axl Rosenberg of MetalSucks was optimistic about this release stating, "I'm certainly gonna give this band another chance."

== Track listing ==
All tracks are written by Matt McChesney and Tommy Church, except where noted.

No.	Title	Writer(s)	Length
1.	"The Curtain Hits the Cast"		3:38
2.	"Narcosis"		3:31
3.	"Venus Mourning"		4:39
4.	"Worn Out Wings"		3:30
5.	"Fixed Like Medication"		3:41
6.	"Obsidian Halo"		3:27
7.	"Light of Day"		2:29
8.	"Requiem"		3:08
9.	"Bleed Together"	McChesney, Church, Jason Suecof	3:11
10.	"Smut Queen"		3:31
11.	"Portrait"		2:56

== Personnel ==
The Autumn Offering

- Matt McChesney – vocals
- Tommy Church – lead guitar, engineer
- Matt Johnson – rhythm guitar, keyboards, engineer
- Matt Poggione – bass

Additional musicians

- Benjamin Goodman – keyboards
- Jonathon Lee – drums

Production

- Mark Lewis – producer
- Jason Suecof – engineer
