= Mutiny Within (album) =

- Cover art by Viktor Koen

Studio album by Mutiny Within
- Released: February 23, 2010 (United States); April 26, 2010 (United Kingdom)
- Recorded: Dec 2008 – Sept 2009 at Bieler Bros. Studios in Pompano Beach, Florida
- Genre: Power metal, thrash metal, progressive metal, melodic death metal, metalcore
- Length: 40:25
- Label: Roadrunner
- Producer: Jason Bieler

Special Edition
- Special Edition artwork. From left to right: Daniel Bage, Drew Stavola, Andrew Jacobs, Chris Clancy, Bill Fore and Brandon Jacobs.

Singles from Mutiny Within
- 1. "Awake" Released: November 16, 2009; 2. "Lethean" Released: July 14, 2010

Mutiny Within is the debut studio album by New Jersey heavy metal band, Mutiny Within, released on February 23, 2010, in the US, and on April 26, 2010, in the UK, both through Roadrunner Records. The album was recorded at Bieler Bros. Studios in Pompano Beach, Florida, produced by Jason Bieler, and mixed by Martyn "Ginge" Ford and Jeff Rose at Not-In-Pill Studios, Newport, Wales. This album was released in two different versions: the standard edition, which was released as a CD and included eleven tracks and a small illustrated booklet with lyrics; and the special edition, which was digitally released and included the eleven album tracks plus four bonus tracks (one non-album track and three live tracks). The self-titled debut album sold around 900 copies in the US in its first week of release, landing at position No. 41 on the "Top New Artist Albums (Heatseekers)" chart.

This is the only full-length record Mutiny Within had with Roadrunner Records and former drummer Bill Fore; he parted ways from the band months after the album release, on July 7, 2010. Wishing him the best of luck on moving forward, he was temporarily replaced with 25-year-old Chad Anthony, who is also from New Jersey. They were searching for a permanent drummer for a few months, and to do so, they cancelled their touring with Nevermore to take the time to properly audition and rehearse. The band first decided to break up in late 2011, amidst the production of their self-produced second studio album. However, in early 2012, founding member, bassist and main songwriter Andrew Jacobs and singer Chris Clancy decided to finish their album as their last work together and as a gift to the fans, which was finished on late 2012, and released digitally on January 12, 2013, under the name of Mutiny Within II: Synchronicity. After the positive response of their work, they decided to continue making music together.

== Writing and recording ==
Mutiny Within started to record their self-titled debut album in December 2008 and was finished in September 2009. The whole album was recorded at various places within different dates: at Big Shot Studios, Altamonte Springs, FL, where the drums were recorded (Dec 2008); at Audiohammer Studios, Sanford, FL, the guitars (Dec 2008 – Feb 2009); and at Bieler Bros. Studios, Pompano Beach, FL, the vocals, keyboards, bass and additional guitars were recorded (Apr–May 2009). Then, it was mixed by Martyn "Ginge" Ford and Jeff Rose at Not-In-Pill Studios, Newport, Wales in Jul–Sept 2009 and mastered by Ted Jensen at Sterling Sound, New York City in September 2009. The same is explained in the following table.

Work	Date	Studio	Place
Drums	Dec 2008	Big Shot Studios	Altamonte Springs, FL
Guitars	Dec 2008 – Feb 2009	Audiohammer Studios	Sanford, FL
Vocals, keyboards, bass and additional guitars	Apr–May 2009	Bieler Bros. Studios	Pompano Beach, FL
Mixing (by Martyn "Ginge" Ford and Jeff Rose)	Jul–Sept 2009	Not-In-Pill Studios	Newport, Wales
Mastering (by Ted Jensen)	Sept 2009	Sterling Sound	New York City

Basically, the initial sessions in Audiohammer Studios, with producer Jason Suecof, most of the music was recorded and arranged. When the band left "Audiohammer Studios" it was only keyboard, solos and vocals left un-recorded. It was on Bieler Bros. Studios, with Jason Bieler as the producer, where they finished every detail of their songs. In the same sessions, they recorded their song "The End", which was part of the compilation EP God of War: Blood & Metal (2010), featuring other bands from Roadrunner, such as Dream Theater, Trivium and Killswitch Engage.

== Release and promotion ==
To promote their new album, Mutiny Within offered their debut album for just $5, and for $10 more a t-shirt, for a limited time at Roadrunner Records official website, for the US only; and for the UK, the pre-order at Play.com included an instant download of a live version of the song "Year of Affliction".

The lead single of the album, "Awake", was digitally released on November 16, 2009, and was offered as a free download on November 2 for only 24 hours at Roadrunner Records official website to promote their new album. A music video was released for "Awake" on January 7, 2010, and was directed by Patrick Kendall.

The second single, "Lethean", was released with a live music video the band posted via YouTube on July 14, 2010, which was directed by Tommy Jones and filmed during their North American tour with Soilwork, Death Angel, Augury and Swashbuckle.

== Reception ==
Professional ratings
Review scores
Source	Rating
Allmusic	3.5/5 stars
The New Review	4.5/5 stars
PopMatters	9/10 stars

Mutiny Within's skillful eponymous debut album has received positive reviews from numerous sources. Phil Freeman, of Allmusic, states that "[...] the element Mutiny Within has on their side is actual songwriting. These tracks have dynamics, constantly shifting the mood and keeping things interesting" and described that this album "[...] is an assured, skillful debut that demonstrates a lot of promise for the future." Chris Colgan of PopMatters favorably described the band: "[...] Blending the intricate technical aspects of Dream Theater and Into Eternity, the soaring vocal styles of Kamelot and Firewind, and the straightforward thrash brutality of Children of Bodom and Unearth, Mutiny Within have established a completely unique sound that gives them a huge level of appeal", and described the album as "[...] a solid, powerful piece that will surely attract metal fans from all over the spectrum".

"Year of Affliction"
"Year of Affliction" is a good example of how Mutiny Within combines the aggression of the guitars and drums with the melody of the keyboards and vocals.

One of the things that are most recognized from this album is "not the technically sound, aggressive, and chunky guitars" says The New Review writer, Adam Schultz, but "the voice of lead man Chris [Clancy]". Explaining how he never heard "such amazing vocals" in his career in heavy metal, he explained how "Chris can delve low and growl with the best of them, and then a millisecond later, take his voice high enough to give any soul diva a run for her money. We're not talking 80's metal annoyingly high clean vocals, either. We're talking this could destroy any American Idol's career caliber singing." He also compared the whole band with other metal bands: "[...] This is Killswitch Engage with harder aggression. This is Trivium with better technical chops. This is All That Remains with more atmosphere. Mutiny Within is beating them at their own game. [Their] solos are in the DragonForce vein, just not as wacky and long, which serves to enhance the sheer technical magnitude of what's being played. These guitarists know their fretboards well and it's obvious every time they decide to go into overdrive."

Progressive metal band, Dream Theater, also gave the album a positive review. Guitarist John Petrucci stated: "I love the melodic content. Makes it really enjoyable to listen to while the technicality of the music totally contributes to the song power and makes it more interesting to me than typical metal. They should be huge!" drummer Mike Portnoy added: "These guys are real good! They would go over amazingly well with our audience..."

Heavy Metal band Trivium's bassist Paolo Gregoletto, commented favorably about the band: "Mutiny Within are probably one of the best new bands out at the moment, being able to mix their technical prowess with soaring melodic vocals like a band that has been at this for quite a while. Having had the chance to hear some of the initial tracking of the album, I was very impressed with how strong of [a] debut they had made upon its release. This album is laced with hooks and big riffs – definite Top 10 of 2009 for sure!"

As of April 2012, the album has sold approximately 7,500 copies.

== Track listing ==
All lyrics written by Chris Clancy. All music composed by Andrew Jacobs, except where noted.

Standard edition

1. "Awake" – 3:45
2. "Images" – 3:27
  - Music: Andrew Jacobs, Daniel Bage and Brandon Jacobs.
3. "Falling Forever" – 3:51
4. "Year of Affliction" – 3:45
5. "Forsaken" – 3:40
  - Music: Daniel Bage, Drew Stavola, Brandon Jacobs, Andrew Jacobs and Chris Clancy.
6. "Lethean" – 3:34
7. "Oblivion" – 3:44
8. "Undone" – 3:18
  - Music: Brandon Jacobs, Andrew Jacobs, Drew Stavola and Chris Clancy.
9. "Hours" – 2:59
10. "Suffocate" – 4:37
  - Music: Andrew Jacobs and Brandon Jacobs.
11. "Reflections" – 3:45
  - Music: Andrew Jacobs and Drew Stavola.

Special edition bonus tracks
12. "Losing Sight" – 3:42; Music: Andrew Jacobs, Brandon Jacobs, Drew Stavola and Chris Clancy.; 13. "Awake" (Live) – 3:58; 14. "Images" (Live) – 3:31; Music: Andrew Jacobs, Daniel Bage and Brandon Jacobs.; 15. "Lethean" (Live) – 3:38

== Personnel ==
Mutiny Within

- Chris Clancy – vocals
- Daniel Bage – guitars, guitar solos (tracks 5, 6, 8, 9 and 10)
- Brandon Jacobs – guitars, guitar solos (tracks 1–4, 6–8, 10 and 11)
- Andrew Jacobs – bass guitar
- Drew Stavola – keyboards, keyboard solos (tracks 1–3 and 7)
- Bill Fore – drums

Additional musicians in "Oblivion"

- Justin Hill – guest vocals
- Dwight D. Eisenhower – speech excerpts
- Jordan Maxwell – speech excerpts
- George H. W. Bush – speech excerpts
- Gordon Brown – speech excerpts

Production

- Jason Bieler – producer
- Matt LaPlant – engineering, digital editing
- Jason Suecof – additional production, digital editing, additional engineering
- Mark Lewis – additional engineering, additional digital editing
- Michael Leslie – additional engineering, additional digital editing
- Chris Clancy – additional digital editing, art direction
- Martyn "Ginge" Ford – mixer
- Jeff Rose – mixer
- Ted Jensen – mastering
- Viktor Koen – art direction, design, illustration
- Bill Fore – art direction
- Pieter M. Van Hattem – photography
- Madelyn Scarpulla – art supervision
- Gail Marowitz – creative direction

== Chart positions ==
Chart (2010)	Peak position
Heatseekers Albums	43
