= Slow Death (album) =

Studio album by Carnifex
- Released: August 5, 2016
- Recorded: February 15, 2016 – March 20, 2016
- Studio: Audiohammer Studio, Sanford, Florida
- Genre: Deathcore, symphonic black metal
- Length: 37:06
- Label: Nuclear Blast
- Producer: Jason Suecof

Carnifex chronology
| Die Without Hope (2014) | Slow Death (2016) | World War X (2019) |

Singles from Slow Death
- 1. "Drown Me in Blood" Released: May 25, 2016; 2. "Six Feet Closer to Hell" Released: June 21, 2016; 3. "Slow Death" Released: July 22, 2016

Slow Death is the sixth studio album by American deathcore band Carnifex. It was released on August 5, 2016, through Nuclear Blast and was produced by Jason Suecof.

== Background and recording ==
On November 3, 2014, Carnifex announced that they are working on new material for the forthcoming album. On September 3, 2015, vocalist Scott Lewis stated during an interview that the band will be releasing their new album in the summer of 2016. On January 14, 2016, the group announced that the album is in pre-production.

On February 16, Carnifex begun recording the new album. On February 29, a tease of a new song the band have in the works for their album was posted through their social media accounts. On April 15, the band would be filming a music video for a track from the album and were looking for fans to take part in the shoot, which took place in Los Angeles on April 24. On May 11, they revealed the album itself, the album cover, the track list, and release date.

== Critical reception ==
Professional ratings
Review scores
| Source | Rating |
|---|---|
| Distorted Sound | 9/10 |
| KillYourStereo | Positive |
| Louder Sound | 3.5/5 stars |
| Metal Injection | 8.5/10 |
| Rock Sins | 8/10 |
| Wall of Sound | 7/10 |

The album received positive reviews from critics. Jessica Howkins of Distorted Sound scored the album 9 out of 10 and said: "Deathcore is a falling genre, many are forgetting its existence whilst others are moving on, but it is bands like Carnifex when they release titans such as Slow Death that keep it alive. The album is stunning from start to finish, and everything that the band wanted to achieve, they have done and more. Slow Death is without a doubt, the deathcore album of 2016." KillYourStereo gave the album a positive review and stated: "While I can recommend Slow Death, I feel as though the very expectations and hype set by Carnifex hasn't come to full fruition." Louder Sound gave the album a positive review and stated: It has to be said, though, that Carnifex still aren't breaking any new musical ground with Slow Death, but one thing's for sure – you just can't argue with the quality and effectiveness what's on offer."

Metal Injection rated the album 8.5 out of 10 and stated, "Slow Death is a solid, atmospheric, and a most of all HEAVY release. If you have been lacking in new material to headbang to, then this is the perfect medicine for you. If you're still in the anti-deathcore camp, then this still might not do it for you, but perhaps you could try and be pleasantly surprised." Ali Cooper of Rock Sins rated the album 8 out of 10 and said: "Slow Death is no calculating innovation or threatening game changer, simply a self-assured proof of Carnifex's magnetic presence. Simultaneously accessible and destructive, the omnipresent atmospherics throughout save this from becoming another eventless deathcore addition." Wall of Sound gave the album a score 7/10 and saying: "Slow Death is anything but its namesake. It's a free falling descent into the pits of hell, a journey that not only destroys your neck but annihilates your throat. Carnifex are the premier band in this scene and Slow Death is ten reasons why."

== Track listing ==
Adapted from Apple Music.

| No. | Title | Length |
|---|---|---|
| 1. | "Dark Heart Ceremony" | 4:49 |
| 2. | "Slow Death" | 4:05 |
| 3. | "Drown Me in Blood" | 4:18 |
| 4. | "Pale Ghost" | 3:53 |
| 5. | "Black Candles Burning" | 3:40 |
| 6. | "Six Feet Closer to Hell" | 4:02 |
| 7. | "Necrotoxic" | 3:15 |
| 8. | "Life Fades to a Funeral" | 2:01 |
| 9. | "Countess of the Crescent Moon" | 3:28 |
| 10. | "Servants to the Horde" | 3:29 |
| Total length: | | 37:06 |

== Personnel ==
Credits adapted from AllMusic.

Carnifex

- Scott Lewis – lead vocals
- Jordan Lockrey – lead guitar
- Cory Arford – rhythm guitar, backing vocals
- Fred Calderon – bass
- Shawn Cameron – drums, keyboards

Additional musicians

- Sims Cashion – additional guitar

Additional personnel

- Jason Suecof – production, engineering
- Carnifex – arranging
- Mick Kenney – arranging
- Matt Brown – drum technician
- John Douglass – engineering
- Ronn Miller – assistant engineering
- Mark Lewis – mixing, mastering
- Marcelo Vasco – layout
- Clayton Addison – photography

== Charts ==
| Chart (2016) | Peak position |
|---|---|
| Belgian Albums (Ultratop Flanders) | 173 |
| Belgian Albums (Ultratop Wallonia) | 132 |
| Swiss Albums (Schweizer Hitparade) | 88 |
| UK Independent Albums (OCC) | 47 |
| UK Rock & Metal Albums (OCC) | 30 |
| US Billboard 200 | 95 |
| US Independent Albums (Billboard) | 4 |
| US Top Hard Rock Albums (Billboard) | 3 |
| US Top Rock Albums (Billboard) | 10 |
