= Fear Will Cast No Shadow =

Studio album by The Autumn Offering
- Released: October 30, 2007
- Recorded: 2007
- Studio: Audiohammer Studios in Sanford, Florida
- Genre: Metalcore
- Length: 37:41
- Label: Victory
- Producer: Jason Suecof

The Autumn Offering chronology
Embrace the Gutter (2006)	Fear Will Cast No Shadow (2007)	Requiem (2009)

Singles from Fear Will Cast No Shadow
- 1. "From Atrophy to Obsession"/"Silence and Goodbye" Released: October 23, 2007

Professional ratings
Review scores
Source	Rating
Exclaim!	(mixed)
MetalSucks	1/5 stars

Fear Will Cast No Shadow is the third studio album by Florida metal band The Autumn Offering. The album was released on October 30, 2007 and sold an estimate of 1,300 copies in its opening week. It is The Autumn Offering's first album with former Hell Within's vocalist Matt McChesney. The song "Dystopiate" includes a guest appearance from Ralph Santolla of Deicide and Obituary.

== Track listing ==
1. "From Atrophy to Obsession" - 3:01
2. "The Castaway" - 4:09
3. "Crown Yourself a King, Kill Yourself a Queen" - 3:57
4. "Silence and Goodbye" - 3:15
5. "All That Falls Around Us" - 2:42
6. "A Great Distance" - 3:50
7. "Your Time Is Mine" - 3:15
8. "Fear Will Cast No Shadow" - 3:30
9. "March of the Clones" - 3:11
10. "The Wolves at Your Door" - 3:04
11. "Dystopiate" - 3:47

== Personnel ==
The Autumn Offering

- Matt McChesney - vocals
- Tommy Church - guitar
- Matt Johnson - guitar
- Allen Royal - drums
- Sean Robbins - bass guitar

Additional musicians

- Ralph Santolla - guitar solo in "Dystopiate"
- Jason Suecof - guitar solo in "Dystopiate"
- Jonathan Lee - drums in all songs
- Joe Santangelo - lead guitar
