= Wretched (death metal band) =

American extreme metal band

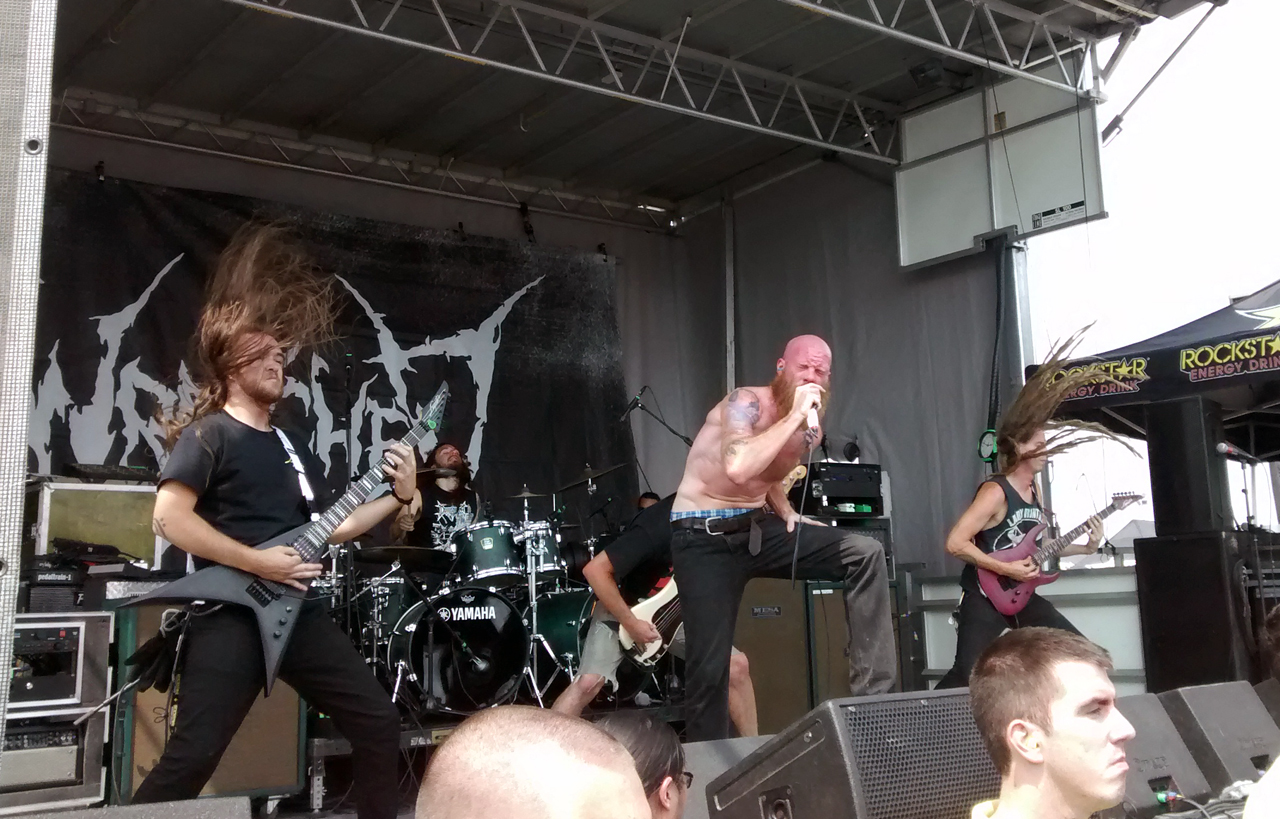

Background information
- Origin: Charlotte, North Carolina, U.S.
- Genres: Melodic death metal, technical death metal, deathcore, metalcore
- Years active: 2005–2014, 2023–present
- Label: Victory Records
- Members: Steven Funderburk; Billy Powers; Marshall Wieczorek
- Past members: Andrew Grevey; Rico Marziali; John Vail; David Briggs; Matthew Rudzinski; Adam Cody

Wretched is an American death metal band from Charlotte, North Carolina, founded by Marshall Wieczorek and Steven Funderburk in 2005. Wretched's musical style is described as melodic death metal, metalcore, deathcore, and technical death metal.

== History ==
Wretched started in 2005 under the name And Since Forgotten as a collaboration between Marshall Wieczorek, Paul McClendon, and Steven Funderburk, who started playing together and looking for new members to start a music group. They recruited JC Lawrence and Josh Simpson and started playing local shows in North Carolina, quickly gaining a local following. They were noticed by Victory Records and were offered a contract in 2008, writing their first record, The Exodus of Autonomy.

The first album released with Victory Records got them nationwide recognition. The Exodus of Autonomy was released in 2009, selling 7,100 units to date according to Nielsen Soundscan. The band hit the road to support the record with most of the shows played with local bands. Guitarist Joel Moore was replaced by John Vail, and bassist David Briggs was replaced by Rico Marziali soon after Beyond the Gate was recorded and released.

Beyond the Gate gathered positive reviews, and a special website (wretchedthrash.com) was created that featured short stories for every song on the album. So far, two pieces have been featured, but with the vocalist change in 2011, there is little chance work will be completed. Along with the new vocalist, the band replaced Rico Marziali with Andrew Grevey as the bass player, and they have toured with The Browning, Serpents and Impending Doom to support Beyond The Gate.

On March 15, 2012, they began The Metal Alliance Tour, performing with DevilDriver, The Faceless, 3 Inches of Blood and Dying Fetus. The tour was in direct support of the new album, which was recorded in February 2012. It was the first record to feature Adam Cody, of the death metal/grindcore act Columns and of Glass Casket as the new vocalist.

On March 1 on YouTube, the band premiered the first single from Son of Perdition, entitled "Repeat... The End Is Near". The video shows both guitarists Steven and John playing the song along with guitar tabs being presented on the side, encouraging the guitar playing community to submit guitar covers of the song.

Son of Perdition was released on March 29, and it scanned 836 copies in its opening weekend. The album got positive reviews, and the band released "Dilated Disappointment" as the single, with an accompanying music video. Wretched was going on tour with King Conquer, followed by a 3 Inches of Blood tour later this summer. John Vail was replaced by his predecessor Joel Moore.

Their fourth studio album Cannibal was released June 10, 2014 through Victory Records. The album stream premiered exclusively with Decibel Magazine on June 9. The album was met with extremely positive reviews. Paulo Maniaco from Metal Temple labelled Cannibal a "masterpiece", giving the album a perfect 10/10, stating:

WRETCHED have managed to give us an awesome album, Death Metal at its best, but still with a different edge. I could experiment touches of Thrash Metal and a bit of Black and Gothic as well. More or less a mix of HAVOK, KATAKLYSM, CANNIBAL CORPSE, EXODUS, and DISSECTION, all mixed in a blender and served on golden plates, an excellent work.

Wretched performed at the 2014 Rockstar Energy Drink Mayhem Festival for the entirety of the tour, playing on the Victory Records stage. Beginning November 26, 2014 Wretched toured the United States with Battlecross and War of Ages. After that, the band split up.

On July 20, 2023, the band announced they had signed with Metal Blade Records with new music "on the horizon", and that former vocalist Billy Powers had rejoined the band.

On August 6, 2025, the band announced that their fifth album, Decay, would be released on October 17, and also released the title track as the album's first single.

== Band members ==
Current members

- Steven Funderburk − guitar (2005–present)
- Marshall Wieczorek − drums (2005–present)
- Billy Powers − vocals (2008–2010, 2023–present)

Touring members

- Connor Mowery - guitar (2023-present)

Former members

- Josh Simpson − vocals (2005–2006)
- JC Lawrence − bass (2005–2006)
- Paul McClendon − guitar (2005–2007)
- Brendan Riley − vocals (2006–2007)
- David Briggs − bass (2006–2009)
- Joel Moore – guitar (2007–2010, 2013–2014)
- Chris Davis − vocals (2007)
- Blake Gullatte − vocals (2007–2008)
- Rico Marziali − bass (2009–2010)
- John Vail − guitar (2010–2013)
- Adam Cody − vocals (2011–2014)
- Andrew Grevey − bass (2011–2026)

Timeline

== Discography ==
Wretched discography
- Studio albums: 5
- Singles: 6
- Music videos: 7

=== Studio albums ===
- The Exodus of Autonomy (2009)
- Beyond the Gate (2010)
- Son of Perdition (2012)
- Cannibal (2014)
- Decay (2025)

=== Music videos ===
- "A Preservation of Immortality" (2011)
- "Cimmerian Shamballa" (2011)
- "My Carrion" (2011)
- "Dilated Disappointment" (2012)
- "Karma Accomplished" (2012)
- "Cranial Infestation" (2014)
- "Wetiko" (2014)
- "Decay" (2025)
