= Mutiny Within =

American heavy metal band

- Also known as: Mutiny, MW
- Origin: Edison, New Jersey, U.S.
- Genres: Melodic death metal; metalcore; thrash metal; power metal; progressive metal
- Years active: 2002–2011, 2012–present
- Label: Roadrunner Records
- Members: Chris Clancy; Daniel Bage; Bill Fore; Andrew Jacobs
- Past members: Brandon Jacobs; Drew Stavola; Jeff Stewart; Lu Obregon; Chad Anthony; Mike Vassallo
- Website: www.mutiny-within.com

Mutiny Within is an American heavy metal band from Edison, New Jersey. The band was formed in 2002 by bassist Andrew Jacobs.

== Background ==
=== Formation, Signing to Roadrunner and debut album (2009–2010) ===
They would go through a number of lineup changes and a name change before finally solidifying into the band they would eventually become. Jacobs recruited his younger brother, Brandon Jacobs, to play guitar, as well as drummer Bill Fore and keyboardist Drew Stavola. While searching for a singer, the band contacted Chris Clancy in England, based on a performance he posted on YouTube. Clancy moved to the United States and dedicated himself to the band. The final member, Daniel Bage, also came over from England when Clancy invited him to join the band in the studio to record some guitar solos. In 2010, Mutiny Within released their self-titled debut on Roadrunner Records.

Their song "Born to Win" was the theme song to the WWE wrestler Evan Bourne from July 27th, 2009, until his release from the company in 2014. Roadrunner Records released a demo of their song "Awake" on their downloadable compilation album Annual Assault (2009). The song "Awake" was later released to Roadrunner subscribers and on iTunes for purchase. They also recorded another song called The End for the Roadrunner Records EP God of War: Blood & Metal.

Their tours lined up included a North American summer tour supporting Soilwork with Death Angel running from July 14 through August 15, 2010. The band parted ways with drummer Bill Fore months after their self-titled debut album release. Bill Fore went on to play with former Black Market Hero guitarist and solo guitar instrumentalist Angel Vivaldi. Wishing him the best of luck on moving forward, he was temporarily replaced with 25-year-old Chad Anthony, who is also from New Jersey. Anthony learned all of the songs in only two weeks to be ready in time for the 2010 North American tour with Soilwork and Death Angel. They announced on September 20, 2010, that they needed to cancel their touring with Nevermore to do take the time to properly audition and rehearse for a new drummer. On October 5, 2010, they announced that they also cancelled their tour with Scar Symmetry and Epica, to concentrate on their new material for their second album and find a new permanent drummer instead of using yet another fill in drummer.

=== Departure of Chris Clancy, Planned Second Album and hiatus (2011) ===
On February 23, 2011, it was announced that the band had been dropped by Roadrunner Records, following failure to meet the 10,000 unit sales requirements of its debut album within one year.

The band released a thirty-second trailer for a second album on YouTube. Although no official announcement has been made, Chad Anthony was listed on the band's MySpace as their drummer. Chris Clancy announced his departure from the band due to financial reasons on June 20, 2011, while Drew Stavola had apparently left the band earlier. The band is currently making a process on these changes. They also said that they will start the search for a new vocalist and new information of the upcoming album will be available soon.

On October 11 the band announced via their Facebook that the band would take an indefinite hiatus due to the difficulties of finding a new vocalist.

The statement was made by Bassist Andrew Jacobs:

It saddens us to announce today that we are taking an indefinite hiatus. We've been searching the globe for a replacement vocalist for most of the year, and we've come to a point where we simply can't afford to pass up other opportunities any longer. We want our fans to know that we tried to avoid this any way we could. To reach you all around the world with our music has truly been a dream come true, know that we would continue this journey right now in a heartbeat if we could. We will be updating the MW pages and our personal pages as we start to announce new projects, touring work, etc. Also, we are still on great terms with Chris and have discussed releasing some 2nd album material in the future. Thank you for all of your support throughout the years. MW fans are still the best out there, we will be keeping in touch with you guys.

During the hiatus, Andrew Jacobs started the band Vext with ex-Snot/Divine Heresy singer Tommy Vext, as well as Bill Fore and guitar virtuoso Angel Vivaldi.

=== Album revival and Synchronicity (2012) ===
On January 31, 2012, the band posted YouTube links via Facebook for two unreleased demo tracks that were supposed to be on the second record, they are called In My Veins and Falls to Pieces. After a very good response the band said that they will probably put out more unreleased songs in the future. On July 5, 2012, Chris Clancy announced on his personal Facebook page that he would record vocals for several unfinished Mutiny Within tracks:

Next week I'm tracking vocals for the unreleased Mutiny Within tracks. Quite excited about it after over a year of being sat on my hard drive doing nothing! I've been working on making the instrumental versions for the last week and they sound epic.

Even though the band members remained quiet during most of 2012, members Chris Clancy and guitarist Brandon Jacobs worked together with Frederic Riverin with his solo work entitled I, Legion. This project also featured Björn Strid and Peter Wichers (Soilwork), Jon Howard (Threat Signal), and Angel Vivaldi. The album Beyond Darkness, was released in September 2012.

On September 29, 2012, the band posted the following on Facebook.

It's great to finally show you what we've been working on since our first album.

Share this with everybody you know,

Chris, AJ, Brandon, Bill & Dan.

Although no official announcement was made, this post confirmed that Bill Fore had re-joined the band.

The title of the new album was announced as "Mutiny Within II: Synchronicity", with a release date of January 12, 2013. Clancy also set up a project called Industry Embers, an organisation dedicated to spread the word about music piracy. He revealed that music piracy had been the downfall of Mutiny Within, with the debut album only selling around 10,000 copies since released, and the album being shared and pirated at least 100,000 times.

"When Tommy Jones put to me the idea of Industry Embers, it was just a concept. Now it is becoming a reality and it feels good to be involved in something that will have a positive impact on the industry. Whether it be a small impact or something bigger, it doesn't matter. Personally, I have shown many people how piracy is killing the music they love and this gives me a platform to continue spreading that message." - Chris Clancy

The single "Embers" off the album was released on December 15, 2012. On December 25, the band released another song "Machines" for streaming.

In a Facebook update on January 21, 2013, the band released the following statement:

"The response for our new album has been completely overwhelming, we are really speechless. We want to say thank you, and also say that because of you, Mutiny Within has decided to continue making music. We are already making plans to write, and perform again. ... thank you all so much, you have kept our dream alive."

=== Origins (2017) ===
Mutiny Within released their third album, Origins, on February 10, 2017. They released a single called "Archetype of Destruction" on December 21, 2016.

Mutiny Within released the single, Dystopian Tomorrow, on December 2, 2024.

== Band members ==
Current Lineup

- Chris Clancy – vocals, rhythm guitar
- Daniel Bage – guitars, keyboards, bass guitar
- Bill Fore – drums

Former members

- Andrew Jacobs – bass guitar
- Drew Stavola – keyboards
- Chad Anthony – drums
- Jeff Stewart – guitars
- Luis Obregon – guitars
- Brandon Jacobs – guitars
- Samus – drums

== Discography ==
Studio album

- Mutiny Within (2010)
- Synchronicity (2013)
- Origins (2017)

Demos

- Mutiny (Demo) (2006)
- Audition (Demo) (2006)

Other contributions

- God of War: Blood & Metal - "The End" (2010)
- WWE The Music: A New Day, Vol. 10 - "Born to Win" (Evan Bourne's Theme) (2010)
- Metal Hammer Presents... A Tribute to AC/DC - "Highway to Hell" (2010)
- Roadrunner Records: Annual Assault - "Awake (Demo)" (2009)
