= Carnifex (band) =

American deathcore band

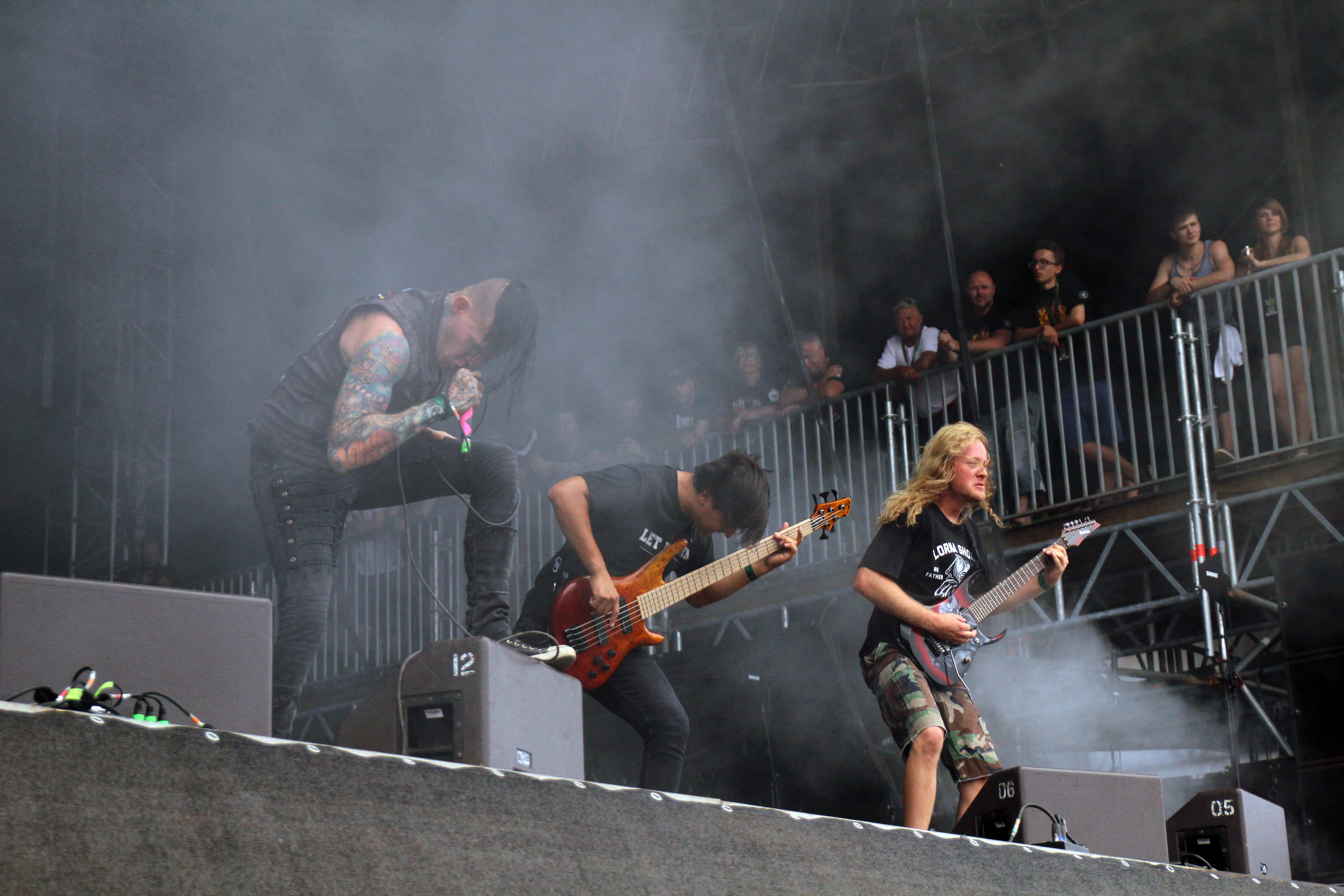
- Carnifex performing at With Full Force 2014

Background information
- Origin: San Diego County, California, U.S.
- Genres: Deathcore ,symphonic black metal
- Years active: 2005–2012; 2013–present
- Labels: Nuclear Blast; Victory; This City Is Burning; Enclave; Sumerian
- Members: Scott Ian Lewis; Shawn Cameron; Cory Arford; Fred Calderon; Neal Tiemann
- Past members: Rick James; Kevin Vargas; Travis Whiting; Steve McMahon; Jake Anderson; Ryan Gudmunds; Jordan Lockrey
- Website: carnifexmetal.com

Carnifex is an American deathcore band from San Diego County, California. Formed in 2005, they are currently signed to Sumerian Records after having been signed to Nuclear Blast. They have released nine studio albums and three EPs. Since 2022, the band has consisted of founding members, lead vocalist Scott Ian Lewis and drummer Shawn Cameron, along with rhythm guitarist Cory Arford, bassist Fred Calderon and lead guitarist Neal Tiemann.

== History ==
=== Formation and early recordings (2005–2006) ===
Carnifex was founded in December 2005 in Fallbrook, California. They debuted their career with a self-titled EP, which was released on May 18, 2006. It features five tracks and was distributed through Enclave Records. In September 2006, Rick James and Kevin Vargas left the band. Shortly thereafter, Steve McMahon joined on bass and Travis Whiting joined on guitars.

Carnifex recorded an EP before the end of 2006 titled Love Lies in Ashes, which was released through Acropolisrpm Records on March 13, 2007. It was sold exclusively at shows as well as online stores such as iTunes before the group began work on their full-length debut album.

=== Dead in My Arms (2007–2008) ===
After their release of Love Lies in Ashes, Carnifex was signed to underground label This City Is Burning Records in March 2007, and they recorded their debut full length Dead in My Arms, with yet another member change. The band, though, was still a four-piece outfit, with current guitarist Cory Arford replacing Travis Whiting in March 2007. The line-up during the recording of Dead in My Arms was Scott Lewis (vocals), Shawn Cameron (drums and keyboards), Steve McMahon (bass) and Cory Arford (guitars).

Dead in My Arms was released on July 12, 2007. Carnifex began touring full-time with the record's release. Touring guitarist Jake Anderson was recruited as a lead guitarist from July to November 2007. During this time, the band toured with groups such as Emmure, Whitechapel, and MyChildren MyBride, For Today, 12:08, among others. The reasonable success of Dead in My Arms, and the prevalence of the deathcore genre as a whole, attracted the attention of Victory Records. In November 2007, after the departure of Steve McMahon and Jake Anderson, Carnifex signed a deal with Victory with now current members Fred Calderon (bass) and Ryan Gudmunds (lead guitar).

=== The Diseased and the Poisoned (2008–2009) ===
Carnifex's second album, The Diseased and the Poisoned, was released on June 24, 2008, and reached No. 19 on the Billboard Top Heatseekers Chart. Since the release of The Diseased and the Poisoned, Carnifex toured over 22 countries with such bands as the Black Dahlia Murder, Despised Icon, Obituary, Unleashed, Finntroll, Warbringer, Parkway Drive, Unearth, Architects, Whitechapel, Protest the Hero, Bleeding Through, Darkest Hour, and Impending Doom.

=== Hell Chose Me and Until I Feel Nothing (2009–2012) ===
On November 28, 2009, Carnifex finished recording their third full-length album Hell Chose Me, which was released on February 16, 2010. The record sold more than 3,100 copies in its first week within the United States. The group played the 2010 Summer Slaughter Tour in support of the album, and they toured with Unearth, All That Remains, and As I Lay Dying in September 2010. On January 26, 2011, vocalist Lewis announced that the band were writing a new record. "We've been working hard on the new record. We know we have to top Hell Chose Me and were NOT letting you down! Heavier, darker and more pissed in every way [sic]." On February 3, 2011, Carnifex embarked on a full United States tour dubbed the Names Mean Nothing Tour, during which the band was supported by Oceano, the Tony Danza Tapdance Extravaganza, and Within the Ruins. On August 24, 2011, Lewis announced that the title for the new album would be Until I Feel Nothing. He stated that its sound was inspired while listening to the band's three studio albums and he felt like combining all of its style in one record.

On October 9, 2012, Lewis announced that the band would be playing their last three shows in California before an indefinite hiatus. He specifically stated that all members were still current and no one had departed from the group. Lewis also stated that he was unsure of the band's future. Through December 21 to December 23, 2012, the band played three extra shows in California. During the hiatus, Cameron started the symphonic metal band Unicorn Death, in which he brought his wife Diana to be a part.

=== Return from hiatus and Die Without Hope (2013–2015) ===
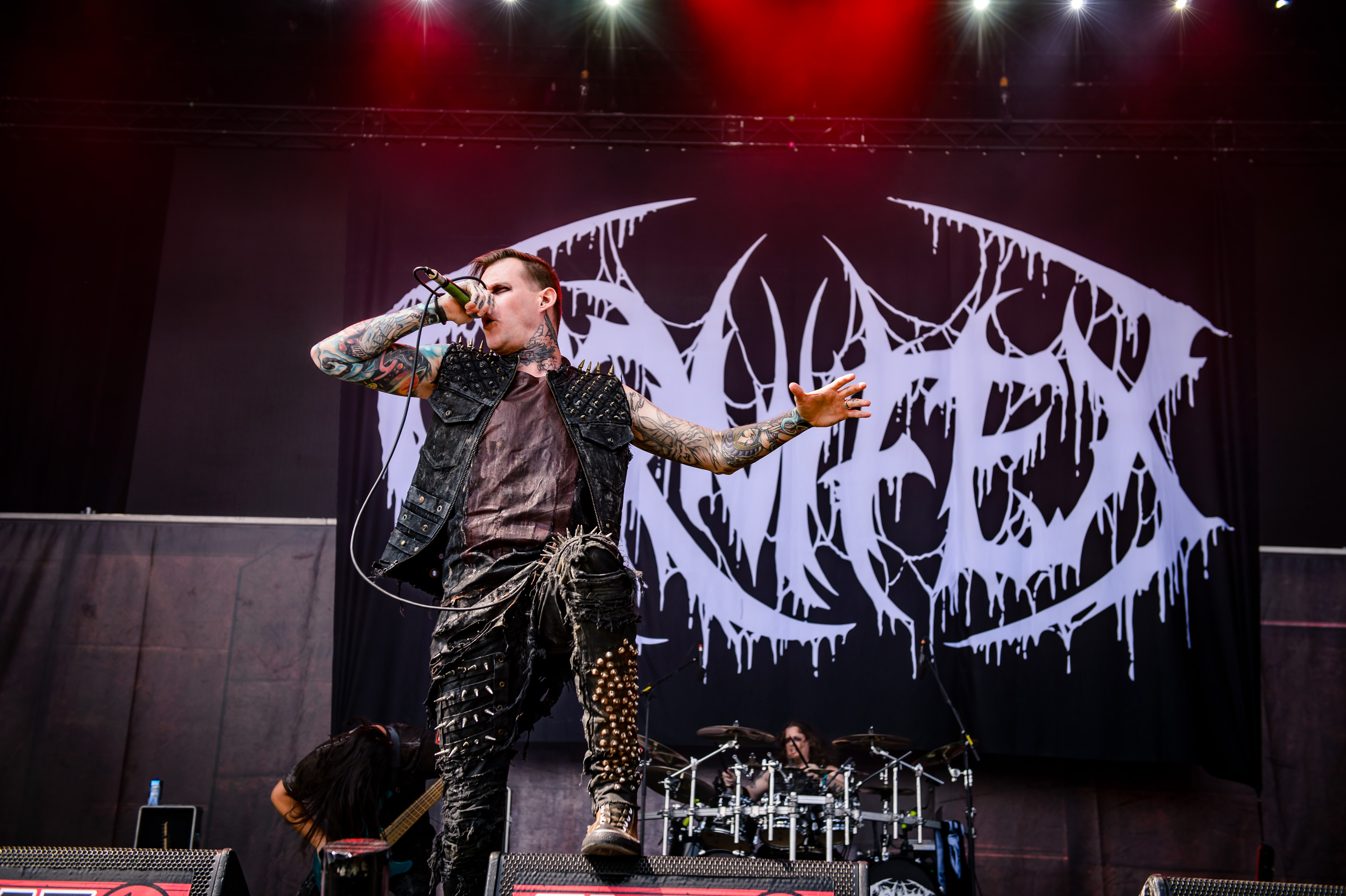
Performing at Germany's Summer Breeze festival.

On June 10, 2013, it was announced that Carnifex returned from their almost year-long hiatus and would be a part of the 2013 Impericon Never Say Die! Tour line-up, replacing metalcore band Miss May I. On July 9, 2013, record label Nuclear Blast announced that Carnifex had signed a record deal and would be releasing their fifth studio album Die Without Hope on March 4, 2014.

In 2014, the band returned to touring with their first North American tour in two years as support for Whitechapel and Devildriver on a massive Summer co-headliner. Revocation, Fit For An Autopsy, and Rivers of Nihil also joined as the support. The band then supported Parkway Drive and Heaven Shall Burn on a November 2014 tour across all of Europe, with Northlane also joining them on the tour. They then opened for Chelsea Grin on their Ashes to Ashes tour in March 2015. Sworn In and the Family Ruin also joined on the tour. Following an Instagram post by Mick Kenney of Anaal Nathrakh in June 2015, it was confirmed that Carnifex were in pre-production for their next album due later in 2015, with Kenney handling the production duties. The album was recorded at Audiohammer Studios in Florida. The band also opened up for Cannibal Corpse in the Netherlands in August 2015. The band then embarked on a 10-year anniversary tour known as the Decade of Despair tour to celebrate the band's formation in October 2015. Within the Ruins, Lorna Shore, and the Last Ten Seconds of Life joined as support. Black Tongue was supposed to appear on the lineup, but they dropped off due to denied visas. A European tour then proceeded with Fallujah and Boris the Blade joining as supports.

=== Slow Death and World War X (2016–2021) ===
The band's sixth studio album Slow Death was released on August 5, 2016. To support the new album, Carnifex joined Cannibal Corpse on the 10th annual Summer Slaughter Tour in North America, as well as Knotfest/Ozzfest. Also, two music videos were released on YouTube to promote the album, the first being "Drown me in Blood" and the second being "Slow Death."

The band also embarked on the Straight Outta Hell Tour during the autumn of the same year with the deathcore bands Oceano, Whitechapel, and Suicide Silence. In early 2017, Carnifex did a headliner across the United States in support of Slow Death. Despised Icon co-headlined with the band on certain dates. Fallujah, Rings of Saturn, Lorna Shore and She Must Burn all joined up as support. Carnifex then joined up on the Vans Warped Tour in the Summer of 2017 alongside groups like Hatebreed and Gwar on the Monster Mutant Stages. Carnifex then headlined the Chaos & Carnage tour in the Spring of 2018. Oceano, Winds of Plague, Archspire, Spite, Shadow of Intent, Buried Above Ground and Widowmaker all joined up on the tour. Tour dates in 2018 also included an appearance at Texas Independence Fest in Austin. Carnifex released the EP Bury Me in Blasphemy on December 7, 2018. A YouTube music video for the title track was released on the same day.

On June 6, 2019, the band released a YouTube video for their new single "No Light Shall Save Us" and announced their upcoming seventh album World War X will be released on August 2, 2019. Carnifex then co-headlined the 2019 Summer Slaughter tour alongside the Faceless and Cattle Decapitation. Rivers of Nihil, Nekrogoblikon, Lorna Shore, and Brand of Sacrifice all joined up as support on the tour. On January 10, 2020, Carnifex announced that lead guitarist Jordan Lockrey was leaving the band with Neal Tiemann of DevilDriver filling in for him on their 2020 Europe tour with Thy Art Is Murder.

=== Graveside Confessions and Necromanteum (2021–2025) ===
On April 9, 2021, the band released a cover of the song "Dead Bodies Everywhere" by Korn followed by a 2021 US Summer Tour. On May 14, 2021, the band released the song "Seven Souls" later followed by the song "Pray for Peace" which was released on June 18, 2021. On July 23, 2021, they announced their eighth studio album Graveside Confessions, which will be out September 3, along with the release of the title track from said album.

To celebrate the 15th anniversary of Dead in My Arms, the band released a re-recorded version of their popular song "Lie to My Face" on July 12, 2022, featuring Oceano vocalist Adam Warren.

On September 9, 2022, Scott Lewis announced that Neal Tiemann had officially joined the band after playing live with them on recent tours, marking the second time the band has extended to a five-piece band. He also announced that the band is working on their ninth studio album with Tiemann. On July 6, 2023, the band released the title track from their ninth studio album, Necromanteum, which was released on October 6, 2023. A music video for the track "Torn in Two" was released on January 25, 2024.

=== More Than Misery (2026–present) ===
The band are confirmed to be making an appearance at Welcome to Rockville, which will take place in Daytona Beach, Florida in May 2026.

On May 8, 2026, Carnifex returned with a new single titled "Roses & Rotting Corpses" alongside the announcement that they have signed with Sumerian Records. This marks the first single released after their ninth studio album, Necromanteum.

On August 28, the band announced their upcoming tenth studio album, More Than Misery, set to be released on November 6 and released the title track of the same name.

== Music style, influences and lyrical themes ==
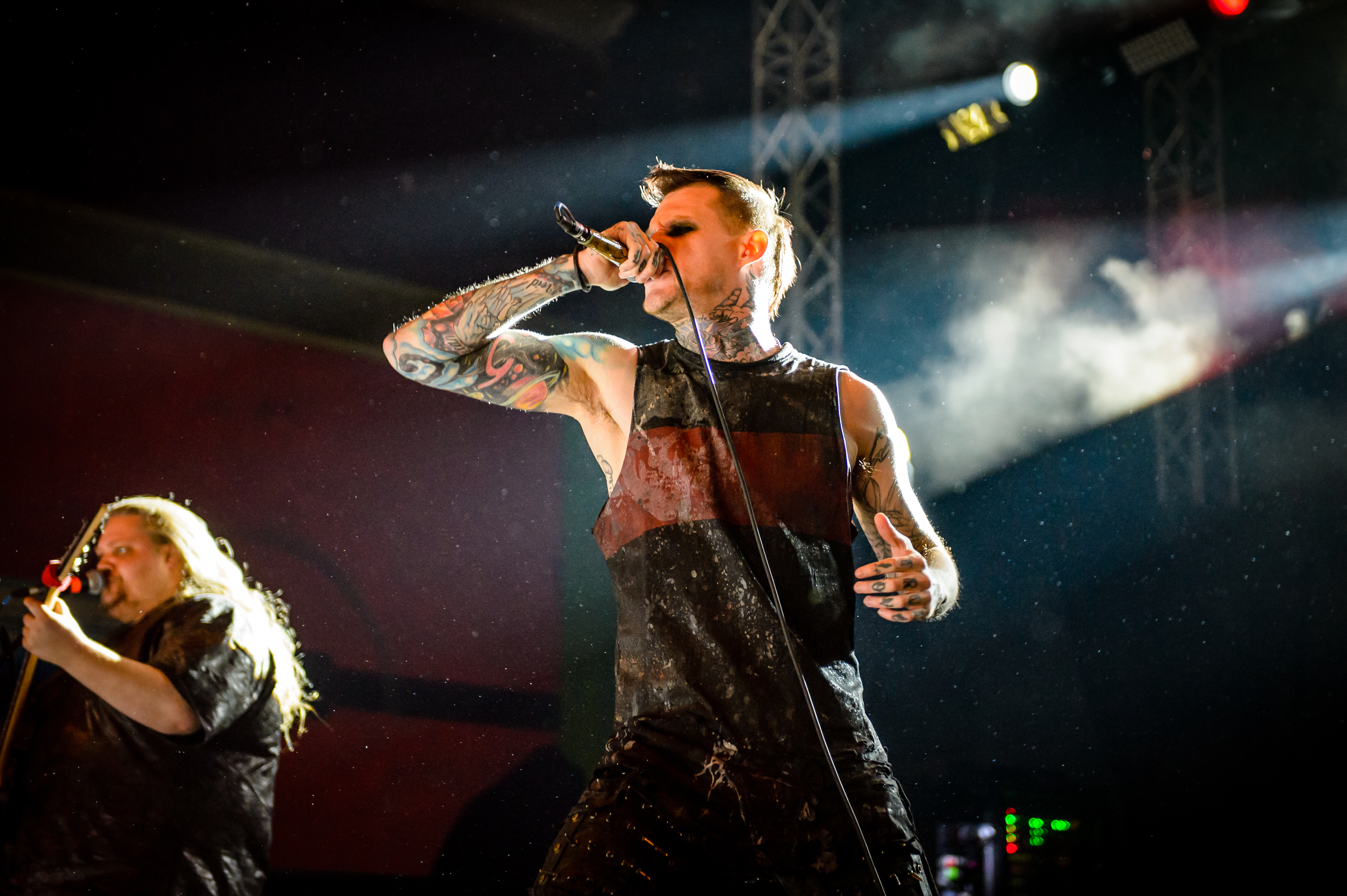
Critics noted Carnifex's growing influence from black metal starting with their Until I Feel Nothing album.

Carnifex plays an extreme metal musical style known as deathcore (a hybrid of death metal and metalcore), and has also been described as blackened deathcore. The band cites Dying Fetus, Dark Funeral, Slayer, Suffocation, Cannibal Corpse, Korn, Slipknot, Nine Inch Nails, Decapitated, Misery Index, The Black Dahlia Murder, Decrepit Birth, Morbid Angel, Immolation, Dimmu Borgir, Behemoth, Dååth, Dissection, At the Gates, In Flames, and Carcass as their influences.

Their third album Hell Chose Me features a sound relating more to death metal along with some black metal influences, as well as some aspects that the band did not visit before, such as including choruses and guitar solos into their songs. However, the band's fourth studio album, Until I Feel Nothing, features much more eccentric influences, even into the realm of black metal with its themes and atmospheric elements. On the album, the band emphasized their black metal influences more, such as Mayhem, Burzum, Emperor, Watain, Bathory, Satyricon, and Cradle of Filth, among others.

In an interview with vocalist Scott Lewis about the "deathcore" label, he stated, "We're not one of those bands trying to escape the banner of deathcore. I know a lot of bands try and act like they have a big problem with that, but if you listen to their music, they are very 'deathcore.'"

=== Lyrical themes ===
Carnifex's lyrics are all based around negative themes. Lead vocalist Scott Lewis has stated the theme of Carnifex will always be negative even when the state of mind he is in is positive. The band's first album Dead in My Arms mainly concerns heartbreak and self-harm, while all the albums by the band reference lyrics about depression, betrayal, hopelessness, anger, hatred, nihilism, and suicide.

I always have written from a personal perspective. My personal life for the last few years really fell apart. Some of that was due to the nature on being in a full-time touring band and the amount of strain it puts on your life back home. Part of that was due to keeping some really damaging people in my life a lot longer than I should have.

— Lewis, 2014

== Band members ==
Current

- Scott Ian Lewis – lead vocals (2005–2012, 2013–present)
- Shawn Cameron – drums, keyboards (2005–2012, 2013–present)
- Cory Arford – rhythm guitar, backing vocals (2007–2012, 2013–present); lead guitar (2007, 2020–2022)
- Fred Calderon – bass (2007–2012, 2013–present)
- Neal Tiemann – lead guitar (2022–present; touring 2020–2022)

Former

- Rick James – lead guitar (2005–2006)
- Kevin Vargas – bass (2005–2006)
- Travis Whiting – lead guitar (2006–2007)
- Steve McMahon – bass (2006–2007)
- Jake Anderson – lead guitar (2007)
- Ryan Gudmunds – lead guitar (2007–2012)
- Jordan Lockrey – lead guitar (2013–2020)

Timeline

== Discography ==
Carnifex discography
- Studio albums: 9
- Extended plays: 3
- Music videos: 17
- Demos: 1

=== Studio albums ===
List of studio albums, with selected chart positions
| Title | Album details | Peak chart positions | | | | | |
| Title | Album details | US | US Heat. | US Indie. | US Rock | US Hard Rock | GER |
|---|---|---|---|---|---|---|---|
| Dead in My Arms | Released: July 12, 2007; Label: This City Is Burning | — | — | — | — | — | — |
| The Diseased and the Poisoned | Released: June 24, 2008; Label: Victory | — | 19 | 46 | — | — | — |
| Hell Chose Me | Released: February 16, 2010; Label: Victory | — | 4 | 27 | — | 22 | — |
| Until I Feel Nothing | Released: October 24, 2011; Label: Victory | — | 4 | 43 | 46 | 12 | — |
| Die Without Hope | Released: March 4, 2014; Label: Nuclear Blast | 98 | — | 21 | 24 | 5 | 81 |
| Slow Death | Released: August 5, 2016; Label: Nuclear Blast | 95 | — | 4 | 10 | 3 | — |
| World War X | Released: August 2, 2019; Label: Nuclear Blast | — | — | 9 | — | — | 93 |
| Graveside Confessions | Released: September 3, 2021; Label: Nuclear Blast | — | — | — | — | — | — |
| Necromanteum | Released: October 6, 2023; Label: Nuclear Blast | — | — | — | — | — | — |
| More Than Misery | Released: November 6, 2026; Label: Sumerian | To be released | | | | | |
"—" denotes a recording that did not chart or was not released in that territory.

=== EPs and demos ===
- Carnifex (EP, 2006)
- Hope Dies with a Decadent (demo, 2006)
- Love Lies in Ashes (EP, 2007)
- Bury Me in Blasphemy (EP, 2018)

=== Music videos ===
List of music videos, showing year released and director
| Year | Title | Album | Director(s) |
|---|---|---|---|
| 2007 | "Lie to My Face" | Dead in My Arms | Robby Starbuck |
| 2008 | "Answers in Mourning" | The Diseased and the Poisoned | Scott Hansen |
| 2010 | "Hell Chose Me" | Hell Chose Me | Jacob Avignone |
| 2010 | "Sorrowspell" | Hell Chose Me | Jacob Avignone |
| 2011 | "Until I Feel Nothing" | Until I Feel Nothing | Scott Hansen |
| 2014 | "Die Without Hope" | Die Without Hope | Shan Dan |
| 2014 | "Hatred and Slaughter" | Die Without Hope | —N/a |
| 2016 | "Drown Me in Blood" | Slow Death | Michael Elinn, Michael R. García |
| 2016 | "Slow Death" | Slow Death | Michael Elinn, Michael R. García |
| 2017 | "Dark Heart Ceremony" | Slow Death | Orie McGinness |
| 2018 | "Bury Me in Blasphemy" | Bury Me in Blasphemy | Tommy Jones, Scott Ian Lewis |
| 2019 | "No Light Shall Save Us" | World War X | Scott Hansen |
| 2019 | "World War X" | World War X | Scott Ian Lewis |
| 2019 | "Visions of the End" | World War X | Ryan Hogue |
| 2021 | "Pray for Peace" | Graveside Confessions | Jim Louvau, Tony Aguilera |
| 2021 | "Graveside Confessions" | Graveside Confessions | Jim Louvau, Tony Aguilera |
| 2021 | "Slit Wrist Savior" | Graveside Confessions | —N/a |
| 2022 | "Lie to My Face" (2022 version; featuring Adam Warren) | Non-album single | Dylan Gould |
| 2023 | "Necromanteum" | Necromanteum | Jim Louvau, Tony Aguilera |
| 2024 | "Torn in Two" | Necromanteum | Tyler Kosec, Nox Nohi |

== Concert tours ==
- June Tour '07 (June 4–10, 2007)
- July Tour '07 (July 12–29, 2007)
- Emmure Tour (August 1–25, 2007)
- Tourannosaurus Rex (August 24 –October 14, 2007)
- The Dead of Winter Tour (February 1–28, 2008)
- Full US Tour (May 15–June 21, 2008)
- North American Domination (September 16–October 14, 2008)
- Never Say Die! Euro Club (November 7–29, 2008)
- Russia Tour (December 1–5, 2008)
- Tour De Mexico (January 7–11, 2009)
- Montreal Assault Tour (January 29–February 27, 2009)
- The Northern Slay Ride Tour 09 (March 2–10, 2009)
- Thrash and Burn European Tour 2009 (April 19–May 16, 2009)
- The Artery Metal Tour (June 12–July 25, 2009)
- West Coast Tour (August 21–30, 2009)
- Everybody Is going to Hell (December 10–13, 2009)
- Bonecrusher Fest 2010 (January 8–February 6, 2010)
- Atticus Metal Tour II (March 4–April 4, 2010)
- Hell Chose Me Us Tour (April 5–20, 2010)
- Hell Chose Me European Tour (May 28–June 19, 2010)
- The Summer Slaughter Tour 2010 (July 17–August 23, 2010)
- As I Lay Dying Tour (September 14–October 11, 2010)
- The December Decimation Tour 2010 (November 26–December 23, 2010)
- Australian Tour 2011 (January 4–9, 2011)
- South East Asia Tour (January 12–16, 2011)
- Bonecrusher Fest 2011 (February 18 - March 19, 2011)
- Names Mean Nothing Tour (March 31 - May 11, 2011)
- Brawloween 2011 (October 21–31, 2011)
- The Discovery US Tour (November 18–December 12, 2011)
- Bonecrusher Fest 2012 (February 10–March 3, 2012)
- This Is Where It Ends 2012 U.S Tour (March 29–April 28, 2012)
- Death Metal Rises Tour (June 1–9, 2012)
- Latin American Tour 2012 (August 11–19, 2012)
- Impericon Never Say Die! Tour 2013 (October 4–26, 2013)
- Die Without Hope Tour 2014 (February 21–March 29, 2014)
- Chaos & Carnage Tour 2022 (May 6–June 4, 2022)
- Necromanteum US Tour Fall 2023 (October 11–November 11, 2023)
- Necromanteum EU/UK Tour 2024 (March 16–April 6, 2024)
- Necromanteum Part II North American Tour (October 4–November 3, 2024)
