= Beyond the Gate (album) =

Studio album by Wretched
- Released: August 3, 2010
- Recorded: April-May 2010
- Studios: Basement Studio, Winston-Salem, North Carolina
- Genres: Progressive metal, melodic death metal, metalcore, technical death metal
- Length: 40:40
- Label: Victory
- Producer: Jamie King

Wretched chronology
The Exodus of Autonomy (2009)	Beyond the Gate (2010)	Son of Perdition (2012)

Professional ratings
Review scores
Source	Rating
Blabbermouth.net	7.5/10
Metal Reviews	85/100
Metal Temple	7/10
Metalzone	75%
Sputnikmusic	3.5/5

Beyond the Gate is the second studio album by Wretched, released on August 3, 2010.

== Track listing ==
1. "Birthing Sloth" – 4:09
2. "The Deed of Elturiel" – 3:09
3. "In the Marrow" – 1:06
4. "A Still Mantra" – 3:43
5. "Cimmerian Shamballa" – 3:28
6. "On the Horizon" (instrumental) – 1:45
7. "Part I: Aberration" (instrumental) – 3:56
8. "Part II: Beyond the Gate" (instrumental) – 6:30
9. "My Carrion" – 4:26
10. "The Guardians of Uraitahn" – 2:12
11. "The Talisman" – 3:19
12. "Eternal Translucence" (instrumental) – 2:57

== Personnel ==
Wretched

- Billy Powers – vocals
- John Vail – electric and classical guitar
- Steven Funderburk – electric guitar, sitar
- Rico Marziali – bass guitar
- Marshall Wieczorek – drums, percussion, didgeridoo
