= Hymns in Dissonance =

Studio album by Whitechapel
- Released: March 7, 2025
- Recorded: 2023–2024
- Genre: Deathcore
- Length: 43:11
- Label: Metal Blade
- Producer: Zach Householder

Whitechapel chronology
Kin (2021)	Hymns in Dissonance (2025)

Singles from Hymns in Dissonance
- 1. "A Visceral Retch" Released: September 12, 2024; 2. "Hymns in Dissonance" Released: January 15, 2025

Hymns in Dissonance is the ninth studio album by American deathcore band Whitechapel. It was released on March 7, 2025, through Metal Blade Records. It was produced by the band's guitarist Zach Householder as their first self-produced album, and their first since A New Era of Corruption to not be produced by Mark Lewis.

== Background and promotion ==
In June 2023, the band stated that they had begun work on their ninth studio album. the following year, former Enterprise Earth drummer Brandon Zackey was officiated as drummer for the band. In developing the album, guitarist Alex Wade stated that their aim was to "write our heaviest album to date. We wanted to put out something that was shockingly menacing and brutal." During the recording sessions, the band made sure only to record on weekdays to save energy and rest during the weekends. On September 12, 2024, the first single, "A Visceral Retch" was released. On January 15, 2025, the second single, "Hymns in Dissonance", was released with a music video, along with the album announcement, release date and track list.

== Composition ==
Hymns in Dissonance is a concept album, detailing the story of a demonic cult and its leader, and his goal to transport to another dimension to gain power. “Hymns In Dissonance is a mockery of the true nature of what hymns are," Phil Bozeman explained, "hymns are melodious and harmonious. Dissonance is the opposite of melody and harmony. Dissonance represents evil. The tracks on the record are the hymns, which represent the seven deadly sins." Wade emphasized that the album has no ties to its predecessor Kin whatsoever, stating "If anything, it’s the polar opposite. For this album it was fun to be able to just let loose and write ignorantly heavy music again. This album stands on its own. Phil was able to create a fresh story to write about, which, in turn, helped us write music with a fresher sound."

The story follows the cultist as he announces his purpose ("Prisoner 666") and ordains his followers to perform obscene rituals to open a portal for him to walk through ("Hymns in Dissonance"); he leaves them to continue their rituals and indulge in violence ("Diabolic Slumber", "A Visceral Retch", "Hate Cult Ritual") as he ventures forth and disdains light and holiness ("The Abysmal Gospel"). He goes to his brother's grave to mock him for his lack of evil ("Bedlam") and endeavors to fulfill his dark purposes ("Mammoth God") before ending up dissipating in a void ("Nothing Is Coming for Any of Us").

== Critical reception ==
Professional ratings
Review scores
Source	Rating
Blabbermouth.net	8.5/10
Kerrang!	4/5
New Transcendence	8/10
Louder Sound	4/5 stars
MetalSucks	4/5
Out of Rage	8/10 stars
Metal Epidemic	5/5 stars
Metal on Tap	10/10

Hymns in Dissonance received positive reviews from critics. Blabbermouth wrote that "Hymns In Dissonance is the ghost of Whitechapel's past, resurrected and given body armor. Songs like 'Diabolic Slumber' and 'The Abysmal Gospel' dig their claws into old-school and melodic death metal more convincingly than ever before, while frenzied, full-pelt attacks like 'A Visceral Retch' and the brutally blackened 'Hate Cult Ritual' are manifestly heavier than anything the band have written in the past. And yet, thanks to the sheer authority that Whitechapel possess since they came of age, there is every reason to think that Hymns In Dissonance has the same breakthrough potential as The Valley and Kin, and maybe even more. The sound of one of modern metal's most heavyweight propositions throwing their weight around and wrecking the place is irresistible and hugely impressive. Maturity can wait. This is white-knuckle, weaponized deathcore with brains, brawn and a point to prove. Hold on to your helmets."

Kerrang! gave a 4 out of 5, saying: "There is plenty here that delivers knuckleheaded thrills, but Whitechapel’s ninth album is more than a simple devolution to deathcore’s first principles. Other raucous styles are drawn into the maelstrom: new drummer Brandon Zackey blasts 'The Abysmal Gospel' into grind territory, while 'Hate Cult Ritual' is infected with the demonic theatricality of black metal. The band’s songwriting accommodates both the frenzied and the epic, and if no melody escapes Phil’s throat, guitarist Ben Savage balances things out with glistening leads on 'Mammoth God' and 'Nothing Is Coming For Any Of Us'. Destined to appeal across the heavy spectrum, Hymns in Dissonance expertly plays to its creators’ many strengths." New Transcendence's Connor Walsh wrote of the album: "It isn’t perfect—there are some moments that seem tame compared to the primal heights of 'A Visceral Retch' and 'Diabolic Slumber', and I’m still not sure how excited I am to hear a band chant '666' in the year 2025—but its damn good, and a testament that you don’t need to teach an old dog new tricks when they’re still able to keep up with the young pups."

Louder Sound gave 4 out of 5 stars, stating: "They may have been overtaken as the poster boys of deathcore, but few can challenge Whitechapel for consistency over such a long period. Furthermore, their authentic evolution since their first, blistering forays has culminated in 2019’s The Valley and 2021’s Kin being their most widely praised albums. Nonetheless, having shaken off deathcore’s confines to mine more emotionally intense and melodic seams, the Tennessee sextet have professed a desire to head back to the furious abandon that characterised their early efforts, The Somatic Defilement and classic This Is Exile—in a field where bands are happy to tinker with the same old tropes, Whitechapel deserve further praise for, once again, keeping their fans on their toes."

MetalSucks gave a positive review, proclaiming: "Experimentation and deviation from the norm can be a good thing; stagnation is the enemy of progress and all that, but at the same time, sometimes it’s good—healthy, even—to return to one’s roots in order to figure out the next step of the journey. You can’t fault a band as successful as Whitechapel for wanting to try something different after a while, especially when there’s a story begging to be told. They are artists, after all. But then again, there’s also something to be said for sticking to your guns and knowing what you’re good at, and I think I speak for most, if not all, of us when I say—it’s good to have you back, boys. Welcome home."

Vee Richardson of Out of Rage said of the album, "As heavy as Hymns in Dissonance certainly is, it never feels one-dimensional. Whitechapel have succeeded in balancing the deathcore brutality of their older material with the more advanced songwriting skills they’ve developed on their last few albums. What we’re left with is an album that’s somehow both nostalgic and forward-thinking. In summary, Hymns in Dissonance is a huge success for Whitechapel. They’ve reasserted their dominance with this record, a vicious, uncompromising, and masterfully crafted return to their heaviest roots. Long-time fans will appreciate the return to their heavier inclinations, and newer fans will have plenty to sink their teeth into. Vicious, relentless, and masterfully crafted, this is one of the band’s strongest releases to date." Metal Epidemic spoke positively of the album, concluding that "They weren’t lying when they said they were going to be channeling the spirit of early Whitechapel. However, they have nearly two decades of playing and songwriting under their belts that can’t be taken out of the equation. So this is not Whitechapel trying to re-capture the lightning in a bottle that was the MySpace deathcore era. This is Whitechapel at the height of their powers, incorporating the brutal elements of their earlier works into the framework of the Whitechapel of the 2020s...and it’s glorious."

== Track listing ==
All lyrics are written by Phil Bozeman; all music is composed by Whitechapel.

No.	Title	Length
1.	"Prisoner 666"	5:15
2.	"Hymns in Dissonance"	5:12
3.	"Diabolic Slumber"	4:30
4.	"A Visceral Retch"	4:05
5.	"Ex Infernis" (interlude)	1:12
6.	"Hate Cult Ritual"	4:07
7.	"The Abysmal Gospel"	4:44
8.	"Bedlam"	3:26
9.	"Mammoth God"	4:29
10.	"Nothing Is Coming for Any of Us"	6:11
Total length:		43:11

== Personnel ==
Credits sourced from the enclosed album booklet

Whitechapel

- Phil Bozeman – vocals
- Ben Savage – lead guitar
- Zach Householder – guitar
- Alex Wade – guitar
- Gabe Crisp – bass
- Brandon Zackey – drums

Additional personnel

- Zach Householder – production, engineering
- Drew Fulk – mixing
- Jeff Dunne – mixing
- Ted Jensen – mastering

== Charts ==
Chart performance for Hymns in Dissonance
Chart (2025)	Peak position
Australian Vinyl Albums (ARIA)	20
Austrian Albums (Ö3 Austria)	17
German Albums (Offizielle Top 100)	28
Scottish Albums (Official Charts)	39
Swiss Albums (Schweizer Hitparade)	59
UK Album Downloads (Official Charts)	26
UK Independent Albums (Official Charts)	11
UK Rock & Metal Albums (Official Charts)	6
