= Whitechapel (disambiguation) =

Whitechapel is a district in London.

== Places ==
- Whitechapel, Lancashire, a small English village
- Whitechapel, Liverpool, a street
- Whitechapel District (Metropolis), a former London government district
- Whitechapel station, London

== Arts and entertainment ==
- Whitechapel (band), an American deathcore band
  - Whitechapel (album), their fourth studio album
- "Whitechapel", a song and single by S.C.U.M (band)
- Whitechapel (film), a 1920 German silent crime film
- Whitechapel (TV series), an ITV drama series
- Whitechapel Boys, a group of writers

== Other ==
- Whitechapel (UK Parliament constituency)
- Whitechapel (London County Council constituency)
- Whitechapel and St Georges (UK Parliament constituency)
- Whitechapel and St George's (London County Council constituency)
- Whitechapel Bell Foundry, London
- Whitechapel and Bow Railway, a former underground railway in east London
- Whitechapel cart, a type of dogcart, a horse-drawn cart
- White Chapel of Senusret I, in Egypt
- Whitechapel Computer Works, a defunct computer company
- Whitechapel, Bishops Nympton, Devon, an ancient former manor
