= I, Colossus =

Studio album by A Different Breed of Killer
- Released: April 29, 2008
- Genre: Deathcore
- Length: 33.5 Minutes
- Label: Rise Records
- Producer: Jamie King

Professional ratings
Review scores
Source	Rating
About.com	link
Mammoth Press	link
Punkband.com	link

I, Colossus is the first studio album released by A Different Breed of Killer. It was released on April 29, 2008, by Rise Records, and produced by Jamie King. This album was released to indifferent reviews.

I, Colossus is a concept album about a man who was the subject of a genetic experiment gone wrong, and spends 20 years in solitude before emerging to wreak vengeance on his captors, and eventually, the world.

== Track listing ==
1. "Dawning" - 1:29
2. "Liberation of a Giant" - 3:06
3. "The Accidentist" - 3:13
4. "I, Colossus" - 4:08
5. "Omega" - 3:21
6. "Autonomy" - 3:17
7. "To Dismantle the Architect (The Meeting)" - 3:26
8. "The Cleansing Apparatus (Feat. Phil Bozeman of Whitechapel)" - 3:07
9. "The Glorious Fall" - 7:22
10. "Aural Apocalypse" - 1:20

== Credits ==
- Jesse Mainor − vocals
- Ethan Brown − guitar
- Trevor McKee − guitar
- Louie Thal − bass
- Nija Walker − drums
- Jamie King - Producer
- Phil Bozeman of Whitechapel - guest vocals on "The Cleansing Apparatus"
