= Mark Lewis (music producer) =

American music producer

Mark Lewis is an American hard rock/heavy metal music producer. Originally from the Southern Maryland area, he once lived in the Orlando, Florida area. Now Mark works as a producer, engineer, and mixer at his own studio in Nashville, Tennessee.

Lewis was a former producer at Audio Hammer Studios in Sanford, Florida. He has engineered productions and/or mixes for established artists such as Chimaira, Trivium, DevilDriver, The Black Dahlia Murder.

== Discography ==
Mark Lewis production discography
- Studio albums: 135
- Compilation albums: 1
- EPs: 6
- Singles: 1
- Video albums: 1

=== Studio albums ===
Year	Artist	Title	Label	Role	Notes
2005	Roadrunner United	The All-Star Sessions	Roadrunner	Engineer	Tracks: 4, 5, 8, 13, 15
2006	Bury Your Dead	Beauty and the Breakdown	Victory	Engineer, Mixer	
2006	If Hope Dies	Life in Ruin	Metal Blade, Ironclad	Engineer	
2006	Seemless	What Have We Become	Equal Vision	Co-Production, Engineer	
2006	The Autumn Offering	Embrace the Gutter	Victory	Engineer, Mixer	
2006	Trivium	The Crusade	Roadrunner	Engineer	
2007	Adrift	Absolution	Independent	Mixer	
2007	Chimaira	Resurrection	Ferret Music, Nuclear Blast	Engineer	
2007	DevilDriver	The Last Kind Words	Roadrunner	Engineer	
2007	Hell Within	Shadows of Vanity	Lifeforce	Mixer	
2007	Sanctity	Road to Bloodshed	Roadrunner	Engineer	
2007	The Autumn Offering	Fear Will Cast No Shadow	Victory	Engineer	
2007	The Black Dahlia Murder	Nocturnal	Metal Blade	Engineer, Mixer	
2008	All That Remains	Overcome	Prosthetic, Razor & Tie	Engineer	
2008	Beneath the Massacre	Dystopia	Prosthetic	Mix-Engineer	
2008	Bury Your Dead	Bury Your Dead	Victory	Engineer	
2008	Devil's Gift	Devil's Gift	John Galt Entertainment	Engineer	
2008	Evince	The Calling	—N/a	Mixer	
2008	Kataklysm	Prevail	Nuclear Blast	Engineer	
2008	Trivium	Shogun	Roadrunner	Engineer	
2008	Order of Ennead	Order of Ennead	Earache	Engineer, Mixer	
2008	Resurrection	Mistaken for Dead	Massacre	Engineer, Mixer	
2008	Violence to Vegas	Princess to Poison	The Feeding Ground	Engineer, Mixer	
2009	August Burns Red	Constellations	Solid State	Engineer	
2009	Dååth	The Concealers	Century Media	Engineer, Mixer	
2009	Eyeless	The Diary	Listenable	Engineer, Mastering	
2009	Job for a Cowboy	Ruination	Metal Blade	Engineer	
2009	Luna Mortis	The Absence	Century Media	Engineer, Mastering	
2009	The Autumn Offering	Requiem	Victory	Producer, Engineer, Mixer, Mastering	
2009	The Black Dahlia Murder	Deflorate	Metal Blade	Producer, Engineer	
2010	Charred Walls of the Damned	Charred Walls of the Damned	Metal Blade	Engineer, Mixer	
2010	Trivium	"Shattering the Skies Above/Slave New World"	Roadrunner	Producer, Mixer	
2010	Dååth	Dååth	Century Media	Producer, Engineer, Mixer	
2010	Death Angel	Relentless Retribution	Nuclear Blast	Engineer	
2010	Demon Hunter	The World Is a Thorn	Solide State	Mix-Engineer	
2010	Holy Grail	Crisis in Utopia	Prosthetic	Mixer	
2010	Levi / Werstler	Avalanche of Worms	Magna Carta	Mixer	
2010	Order of Ennead	An Examination of Being	Earache	Producer, Engineer, Mixer	
2010	Whitechapel	A New Era of Corruption	Metal Blade	Engineer	
2011	Charred Walls of the Damned	Cold Winds on Timeless Days	Metal Blade	Engineer, Mixer	
2011	Deicide	To Hell with God	Century Media	Producer, Engineer, Mixer	
2011	DevilDriver	Beast	Roadrunner	Producer, Engineer	
2011	Scale the Summit	The Collective	Prosthetic	Producer, Engineer, Mixer	
2011	The Black Dahlia Murder	Ritual	Metal Blade	Producer, Engineer	
2011	Unearth	Darkness in the Light	Metal Blade	Mixer	
2012	God Forbid	Equilibrium	Victory	Producer, Engineer	
2012	Six Feet Under	Undead	Metal Blade	Producer, Engineer, Mixer	
2012	Whitechapel	Whitechapel	Metal Blade	Producer, Engineer, Mixer	
2013	Six Feet Under	Unborn	Metal Blade	Engineer	
2013	Arsis	Unwelcome	Nuclear Blast	Producer, Engineer, Mixer, Mastering	
2013	As Angels Bleed	As Angels Bleed	independent	Mixer	
2013	Battlecross	War of Will	Metal Blade	Producer, Engineer, Mixer	
2013	Chimaira	Crown of Phantoms	eOne	Producer (assistant)	
2013	DevilDriver	Winter Kills	Napalm	Producer, Engineer, Mixer, Mastering	
2013	Holy Grail	Ride the Void	Nuclear Blast	Mixer, Engineer	
2013	The Black Dahlia Murder	Everblack	Metal Blade	Producer	
2013	Whitechapel	The Somatic Defilement	Metal Blade	Mixer, Mastering	Remixed and remastered edition
2014	Carnifex	Die Without Hope	Nuclear Blast	Producer, Engineer, Mixer, Mastering	
2014	Conquering Dystopia	Conquering Dystopia	Independent, Century Media	Producer, Mixer	
2014	Whitechapel	Our Endless War	Metal Blade	Producer, Engineer, Mixer	
2014	Cannibal Corpse	A Skeletal Domain	Metal Blade	Producer, Engineer, Mixer, Mastering	
2014	Unearth	Watchers of Rule	eOne	Producer, Engineer, Mixer, Mastering	
2014	Aversions Crown	Tyrant	Nuclear Blast	Mixer, Mastering	
2015	Coal Chamber	Rivals	Napalm Records	Producer, Engineer, Mixer, Mastering	
2015	Battlecross	Rise to Power	Metal Blade	Engineer, Mixer, Mastering	
2015	The Black Dahlia Murder	Abysmal	Metal Blade	Producer, Mixer, Mastering	
2016	Karybdis	Samsara	Beasting Records	Producer, Mixer, Mastering	
2016	DevilDriver	Trust No One	Napalm Records	Producer	
2016	Whitechapel	Mark of the Blade	Metal Blade	Producer, Engineer, Mixer, Mastering	
2016	Carnifex	Slow Death	Nuclear Blast	Mixer, Mastering	
2016	Fallujah	Dreamless	Nuclear Blast	Mixer, Mastering	
2016	Opal Ocean	Lost Fables	Independent	Mixer, Mastering	
2017	Aversions Crown	Xenocide	Nuclear Blast	Mixer, Mastering	
2017	Dekta	Dekta	Audiovisuals de Sarria	Mastering	
2017	Shattered Sun	The Evolution of Anger	Victory	Producer, Engineer, Mixer, Mastering	
2017	Ne Obliviscaris	Urn	Season of Mist	Engineer, Re-amping, Mixer, Mastering	
2017	Threat Signal	Disconnect	Agonia Records	Mixer, Mastering	
2017	Feared	Svart	Independent	Mixer	
2017	War of Ages	Alpha	Facedown	Mastering	
2018	Humiliation	Karnaval Genosida	Armstretch Records	Mixer, Mastering	
2018	Monstrosity	The Passage of Existence	Metal Blade	Mixer, Mastering	
2018	The Agony Scene	Tormentor	Outerloop Records	Producer, Engineer, Mixer, Mastering	
2018	Arsis	Visitant	Nuclear Blast, Agonia	Mixer, Mastering	
2019	Fallujah	Undying Light	Nuclear Blast	Mixer, Mastering	
2019	Kingsmen	Revenge Forgiveness Recovery	Sharptone Records	Producer, Engineer, Mixer, Mastering	
2019	Nile	Vile Nilotic Rites	Nuclear Blast	Mixer, Mastering	
2019	Rings of Saturn	Gidim	Nuclear Blast	Mixer, Mastering	
2019	Whitechapel	The Valley	Metal Blade	Producer, Engineer	
2020	Havok	V	Century Media	Producer, Engineer, Mixer, Mastering	
2020	BPMD	American Made	Napalm Records	Mixer, Mastering	
2020	Aronious	Perspicacity	The Artisan Era	Mixer, Mastering	
2021	Whitechapel	Kin	Metal Blade	Producer, Engineer	
2022	Krisiun	Mortem Solis	Century Media	Producer, Mixer, Mastering	
2022	Fallujah	Empyrean	Nuclear Blast	Mixer, Mastering	
2023	Entheos	Time Will Take Us All	Metal Blade	Engineer (guitars), Mixer, Mastering	
2023	Ne Obliviscaris	Exul	Season of Mist	Producer, Engineer (drums), Mixer, Mastering	
2023	Arrival of Autumn	Kingdom Undone	Nuclear Blast	Producer, Mixer, Mastering	
2023	Dying Fetus	Make Them Beg for Death	Relapse	Mixer, Mastering	
2023	Carnifex	Necromanteum	Nuclear Blast	Mastering	
2024	Vipassi	Lightless	Season of Mist	Mixer, Mastering	
2024	Nile	The Underworld Awaits Us All	Napalm	Mixer, Mastering	
2024	The Black Dahlia Murder	Servitude	Metal Blade	Producer, Engineer (drums), Mixer	
2024	Undeath	More Insane	Prosthetic	Producer, Engineer, Mixer, Mastering	
2024	Entheos	An End to Everything (EP)	Metal Blade	Producer, Engineer, Mixer, Mastering	
2024	Havok	New Eyes (EP)	Century Media	Mixer, Mastering	
2025	Killswitch Engage	This Consequence	Metal Blade	Mixer	
2025	Warbringer	Wrath and Ruin	Napalm	Producer, Engineer, Mixer	
2025	Daughter Chaos	Noble Art	Independent	Producer (drums), Engineer (drums), Mixer, Mastering	
2025	Intrepid	Juxtaposition	Knife Fight Media	Mixer, Mastering	
2025	Devolver	Non Compos Mentis	Independent	Producer, Engineer, Mixer, Mastering	
2026	No/Más	No Peace	Redefining Darkness Records	Mixer, Mastering	
2026	Exodus	Goliath	Napalm	Engineer, Mixer, Mastering	
2026	Six Feet Under	Next to Die	Metal Blade	Mixer, Mastering	
2026	Entheos	Empty on the Inside	Metal Blade	Producer, Mixer, Mastering	
2026	Darkest Hour	Suffer Divine	MNRK Heavy	Producer, Engineer, Mixer	

=== Compilations ===
Year	Artist	Title	Label	Role
2010	Six Feet Under	Graveyard Classics III	Metal Blade	Mixer

=== EPs ===
Year	Artist	Title	Label	Role	Notes
2006	Failsafe	A Black Tie Affair	—N/a	Mixer	
2007	Encidius	2007 EP	—N/a	Producer, Engineer, Mixer	
2009	Written in Blood	In this Fire	—N/a	Producer, Engineer, Mixer, Mastering	
2010	Ascension	Behind Enemy Lines	—N/a	Mixer	
2010	Deliver Us from Evil	Still I Rise	Strych 9 Productions	Producer, Engineer, Mixer	
2010	Various artists	God of War: Blood & Metal	Roadrunner	Producer, Mixer	Track 2
2011	Whitechapel	Recorrupted	Metal Blade	Mixer, Mastering	
2025	Trivium	Struck Dead	Roadrunner	Engineer	

=== Singles ===
Year	Artist	Title	Label	Role
2010	Mutiny Within	"Awake"	Roadrunner	Engineer

=== Video albums ===
Year	Artist	Title	Label	Role
2007	All That Remains	All That Remains: Live	Prosthetic	Engineer
