= Kin (Whitechapel album) =

Studio album by Whitechapel
- Released: October 29, 2021
- Recorded: 2020–2021
- Genre: Deathcore; progressive metal; groove metal; melodic death metal
- Length: 47:49
- Label: Metal Blade
- Producer: Mark Lewis

Whitechapel chronology
The Valley (2019)	Kin (2021)	Hymns in Dissonance (2025)

Singles from Kin
- 1. "Lost Boy" Released: August 31, 2021; 2. "A Bloodsoaked Symphony" Released: September 23, 2021; 3. "Orphan" Released: October 14, 2021

Kin is the eighth studio album by American deathcore band Whitechapel. It was released on October 29, 2021 through Metal Blade Records. The album was produced by Mark Lewis.

== Background and promotion ==
On September 23, 2020, guitarist Alex Wade revealed to Knotfest.com's "Mosh Talks" that recording had begun on the next Whitechapel album. Wade stated the COVID-19 pandemic had given them time to make a new album and that it would once again be produced by Mark Lewis. He also stated the album will contain clean vocals and melody as well as the trademark heaviness the band is known for.

On August 31, 2021, Whitechapel released the first single "Lost Boy" along with an accompanying music video. At the same time, they announced the album itself, the album cover, the track list, and release date. On September 23, the band unveiled the second single "A Bloodsoaked Symphony" and its corresponding music video. On October 14, two weeks before the album release, the band published the third and final single "Orphan" along with a music video. On May 5, 2023, an additional video for "I Will Find You" premiered on the Metal Blade Records YouTube channel.

== Composition ==
Kin, like its predecessor The Valley, is a concept album based on frontman Phil Bozeman's traumatic childhood. Bozeman called the album "a fictional take on a non-fictional story." While The Valley was a retelling of the events of Bozeman's teen years and his parents' deaths, Kin talks of his struggle of accepting their deaths, with the personification of the struggle as an "evil self", a part of Bozeman's personality who cannot accept their absence.

The album's story picks up after Bozeman – now in his late teens – leaves his home ("I Will Find You"), but still traumatized by his parents' deaths and the abuse of his stepfather ("Lost Boy"), he inadvertently creates a metaphysical mirror image of himself, a shadow version of his personality who is in denial about the tragedies, and attempts a dark ritual to resurrect the parents ("A Bloodsoaked Symphony"), despite Bozeman's protests ("Anticure"). The two selves confront each other, and eventually switch places, with Bozeman ending up in the shadow realm where his parents are alive, but only as catatonic shells of themselves ("Orphan"). In a final confrontation between the two, Bozeman pleads with the shadow-self to face the reality and accept that the tragedies are not reversible ("Without You"/"Without Us"); the shadow self eventually relents and asks for forgiveness ("Kin").

== Critical reception ==
Professional ratings
Review scores
Source	Rating
Blabbermouth.net	7.5/10
Distorted Sound	8/10
Kerrang!	4/5 stars
Louder Sound	4/5 stars
Metal Storm	8/10
Wall of Sound	7/10

Kin received generally positive reviews from critics. Dom Lawson from Blabbermouth.net gave the album 7.5 out of 10 and said: "Not surprisingly, then, Kin arrives with great expectations looming overhead, and for the most part it lives up to its predecessor's high standards and subtly oddball take on metal modernity." Distorted Sound scored the album 8 out of 10 and said: "As the new era of WHITECHAPEL continues, it's clear that they're in their element here, writing what they want to and pushing themselves in new sonic directions rather than re-treading the same old deathcore ground as before. Their evolution beyond the genre may have been surprising at first but now feels inevitable given the quality they've shown themselves capable of producing. Kin is another strong entry in one of modern metal's more enviable catalogues." Kerrang! gave the album 4 out of 5 and stated: "A confident, slick and coherent album, Kin is a fine addition to the back-catalogue of one of metal’s most cherished underdogs. The more experimental facets of the record don't land every time, but there are far more hits than misses, and the result is a strong LP that sees Whitechapel push deathcore's boundaries in a new and interesting direction."

Louder Sound gave the album a positive review and stated: "Kin is another evolutionary step from deathcore's most creative minds." Metal Storm gave the album 8 out of 10 and stated: "Whitechapel have managed to turn the corner without spinning out and crashing on the bend, evolving their sound without losing sight of their past and producing the best of both worlds. Kin will likely sit alongside The Valley as a high water mark and template for deathcore bands who want to branch out from their roots, featuring a sound and quality that is as enjoyable to hear as it is likely to be copied in the future." Wall of Sound gave the album a score 7/10 and saying: "This album focuses heavily on lyrics while the importance of strong instrumentals fell to the wayside, the perfect balance they had on The Valley has diminished on Kin. On the other side, Whitechapel is now at the point in their career where they can afford to start experimenting with new sounds and see how far they can stretch that. Kin may attract new fans, but I feel as if the day one fans may find this album ultimately unsettling."

Kin was elected by Loudwire as the 37th best rock/metal album of 2021.

== Track listing ==
Kin track listing
No.	Title	Length
1.	"I Will Find You"	4:54
2.	"Lost Boy"	3:58
3.	"A Bloodsoaked Symphony"	4:28
4.	"Anticure"	5:35
5.	"The Ones That Made Us"	4:10
6.	"History Is Silent"	4:54
7.	"To the Wolves"	3:53
8.	"Orphan"	4:40
9.	"Without You"	1:00
10.	"Without Us"	4:37
11.	"Kin"	5:37
Total length:		47:49

== Personnel ==
Credits adapted from album's liner notes.

Whitechapel

- Phil Bozeman – vocals
- Ben Savage – lead guitar
- Alex Wade – guitar
- Zach Householder – guitar
- Gabe Crisp – bass

Additional musicians

- Alex Rüdinger – drums

Additional personnel

- Mark Lewis – production, engineering
- David Castillo – mixing
- Ted Jensen – mastering
- Phil Bozeman – artwork
- Jillian Savage – cover art
- Sean Cummings – design
- Branca Studio – layout
- Sergio Albert – photography
- Vince Edwards – photography
- Adam Elmakias – photography
- Alex Morgan – photography
- Jeremy Saffer – photography
- Alex Solca – photography
