= Our Endless War =

Studio album by Whitechapel
- Released: April 29, 2014
- Genre: Deathcore
- Length: 38:51
- Label: Metal Blade
- Producers: Whitechapel, Mark Lewis

Whitechapel chronology
Whitechapel (2012)	Our Endless War (2014)	Mark of the Blade (2016)

Professional ratings
Aggregate scores
Source	Rating
Metacritic	67/100
Review scores
Source	Rating
About.com	3.5/5 stars
AllMusic	3/5 stars
Alternative Press	3.5/5 stars
Exclaim!	8/10
Metal Hammer	positive

Our Endless War is the fifth studio album by American deathcore band Whitechapel. It was released on April 29, 2014, via Metal Blade.

The song "The Saw Is the Law" was released on February 26, 2014, as the first single off the album. On April 15, 2014, a lyric video for the song "Our Endless War" was released.

== Reception ==
The album received generally positive reviews from critics. It debuted on Billboard 200 at No. 10, No. 2 on Top Rock Albums, and No. 1 on the Hard Rock Albums chart, selling 16,270 copies in its first week. The album has sold 45,000 copies in the United States as of June 2016. It remains the band's highest-charting album.

== Track listing ==
No.	Title	Length
1.	"Rise" (instrumental)	1:20
2.	"Our Endless War"	3:56
3.	"The Saw Is the Law"	4:27
4.	"Mono"	3:39
5.	"Let Me Burn"	4:23
6.	"Worship the Digital Age"	4:12
7.	"How Times Have Changed"	3:32
8.	"Psychopathy"	3:51
9.	"Blacked Out"	3:32
10.	"Diggs Road"	5:59
Total length:		38:51

Bonus tracks
No.	Title	Length
11.	"A Process So Familiar"	2:52
12.	"Fall of the Hypocrites"	3:00
Total length:		44:43

== Credits ==
Production and performance credits are adapted from the album liner notes.

=== Personnel ===
Whitechapel

- Phil Bozeman – vocals
- Ben Savage – lead guitar
- Alex Wade – guitar
- Zach Householder – guitar
- Gabe Crisp – bass
- Ben Harclerode – drums

Additional musicians

- Ben Eller – guitar solo on "The Saw Is the Law", "Psychopathy", "Blacked Out", "Diggs Road", "A Process So Familiar"

Production

- Mark Lewis – production, engineering, mixing
- Whitechapel – production
- Eyal Levi – drum assistant, digital editing
- Matt Brown – drum tech
- Ted Jensen – mastering

Artwork and design

- Aaron Marsh – artwork
- Whitechapel – art direction

=== Studios ===
- Audiohammer, Sanford, Florida – recording (drums), mixing
- Wade Studios, Louisville, Tennessee – recording (guitars, bass, vocals)
- Sterling Sound, New York City – mastering

== Charts ==
Chart (2014)	Peak position
Austrian Albums (Ö3 Austria)	72
Canadian Albums (Billboard)	23
German Albums (Offizielle Top 100)	50
UK Independent Albums (Official Charts)	31
UK Rock & Metal Albums (Official Charts)	9
US Billboard 200	10
US Digital Albums (Billboard)	21
US Independent Albums (Billboard)	2
US Top Hard Rock Albums (Billboard)	1
US Top Rock Albums (Billboard)	2
US Indie Store Album Sales (Billboard)	14
