= Recorrupted =

EP by Whitechapel
- Released: November 8, 2011
- Recorded: 2011 at Sound Lair Studio in Knoxville, Tennessee.
- Genre: Deathcore
- Length: 17:59
- Label: Metal Blade
- Producer: Whitechapel, Miah Lajeunesse

Whitechapel chronology
A New Era of Corruption (2010)	Recorrupted (2011)	Whitechapel (2012)

Professional ratings
Aggregate scores
Source	Rating
Metacritic	48/100
Review scores
Source	Rating
Alternative Press	3.5/5 stars
PopMatters	2/10
Revolver	3/5 stars

Recorrupted is the first EP by American deathcore band Whitechapel. The EP was released on November 8, 2011 through Metal Blade Records. It consists of one original song, two of their previously released songs remixed ("This Is Exile" and "Breeding Violence"), an acoustic version of "End of Flesh" and a cover of the Pantera song "Strength Beyond Strength".

== Track listing ==
No.	Title	Length
1.	"Section 8"	4:26
2.	"Strength Beyond Strength" (Pantera cover)	3:47
3.	"Breeding Violence" (Big Chocolate Remix)	2:52
4.	"This Is Exile" (Ben Weinman Remix)	3:15
5.	"End of Flesh" (Acoustic Version)	4:19
Total length:		17:59

== Personnel ==
Whitechapel

- Phil Bozeman – vocals
- Ben Savage – lead guitar
- Alex Wade – guitar
- Zach Householder – guitar
- Gabe Crisp – bass
- Ben Harclerode – drums

Production

- Miah Lajeunesse – recording engineering, production
- Mark Lewis – mixing and mastering
- Shawn Carrano and Andrew Roesch – management
- Mike Milford – artwork
