= Mark of the Blade =

Studio album by Whitechapel
- Released: June 24, 2016
- Studio: Audiohammer Studios in Sanford, Florida.
- Genre: Deathcore; groove metal
- Length: 48:04
- Label: Metal Blade
- Producer: Whitechapel, Mark Lewis

Whitechapel chronology
Our Endless War (2014)	Mark of the Blade (2016)	The Valley (2019)

Mark of the Blade is the sixth studio album by American deathcore band Whitechapel. It was released through Metal Blade Records on June 24, 2016 to mostly positive critical reception. It is the first Whitechapel album to feature lead vocalist Phil Bozeman performing clean vocals on an album, on the songs "Bring Me Home" and "Decennium", and it is the last album to feature drummer Ben Harclerode. A music video for the track "Elitist Ones" was released on June 24, 2016.

== Critical reception ==
Professional ratings
Aggregate scores
Source	Rating
Metacritic	74/100
Review scores
Source	Rating
AllMusic	3.5/5 stars
Alternative Press	Positive
Exclaim!	6/10
Metal Hammer	3.5/5 stars
MetalSucks	4.5/5 stars
Rock Sound	7/10

Mark of the Blade was met with generally favorable reviews from critics. At Metacritic (a review aggregator site which assigns a normalized rating out of 100 from music critics), based on 6 critics, the album has received a score of 74/100, which indicates "Generally favorable reviews".

At AllMusic, Thom Jurek wrote in a mostly positive that "In making a record that indulges so many of their songwriting obsessions, Whitechapel's The Mark of the Blade [sic] might have been a mess. It's not. Sequence and flow, moods and styles, all form a coherent whole -- albeit one that might have used a tad more judicious editing. But it's hard to fault a band for trying new things, especially when what they deliver is an album with far more hits than misses." He also praised Mark Lewis' production on the album, and compared the closing track to Tool and Slipknot. In a slightly less positive review for Exclaim!, Denise Falzon described the album as "a bit hit-and-miss. Musically, the new touches work well and flow with the rest of the album, but the clean vocals in particular feel forced and sorely out of place."

== Track listing ==
No.	Title	Length
1.	"The Void"	4:08
2.	"Mark of the Blade"	2:54
3.	"Elitist Ones"	4:37
4.	"Bring Me Home"	4:49
5.	"Tremors"	4:20
6.	"A Killing Industry"	4:05
7.	"Tormented"	4:14
8.	"Brotherhood" (instrumental)	4:20
9.	"Dwell in the Shadows"	4:02
10.	"Venomous"	4:24
11.	"Decennium"	6:11
Total length:		48:04

== Personnel ==
Whitechapel

- Phil Bozeman – vocals
- Ben Savage – lead guitar
- Alex Wade – guitar
- Zach Householder – guitar
- Gabe Crisp – bass
- Ben Harclerode – drums

Additional musicians

- Ben Eller – guitar solo on "The Void", "Bring Me Home", "Tormented", "Dwell in the Shadows", "Venomous"

Production

- Mark Lewis – engineering, production, mixing
- Whitechapel – production
- Matt Brown – drum tech
- James Thatcher – drum tech
- Jason Suecof – additional engineering (guitars)
- John Douglass – digital editing

Artwork and design

- Colin Marks – artwork
- Sean Cummings – art direction
- Whitechapel – art direction

== Charts ==
Chart (2016)	Peak position
Australian Albums (ARIA)	96
Austrian Albums (Ö3 Austria)	36
Belgian Albums (Ultratop Flanders)	124
Belgian Albums (Ultratop Wallonia)	165
German Albums (Offizielle Top 100)	16
Swiss Albums (Schweizer Hitparade)	64
US Billboard 200	72
