= Exul =

Studio album by Ne Obliviscaris
- Released: 24 March 2023
- Genres: Extreme metal; progressive metal
- Length: 51:53
- Label: Season of Mist
- Producers: Mark Lewis, Ne Obliviscaris

Ne Obliviscaris chronology
Urn (2017)	Exul (2023)

Singles from Exul
- 1. "Equus" Released: 6 December 2022; 2. "Graal" Released: 24 January 2023; 3. "Misericorde I – As the Flesh Falls" Released: 21 March 2023

Exul ratings
Review scores
Source	Rating
Metal Injection	8.5/10
MetalSucks	4/5 stars
New Noise Magazine	5/5 stars
Sonic Perspectives	9/10
Sputnikmusic	4.8/5

Exul is the fourth studio album by Australian progressive metal band Ne Obliviscaris. It was released on 24 March 2023 by Season of Mist. The first single from the album, "Equus", was released on 6 December 2022, alongside an accompanying music video. This is their last album with harsh vocalist Marc "Xenoyr" Campbell who left the band in 2025.

== Track listing ==
Exul track listing
No.	Title	Length
1.	"Equus"	12:29
2.	"Misericorde I – As the Flesh Falls"	7:33
3.	"Misericorde II – Anatomy of Quiescence"	9:21
4.	"Suspyre"	10:08
5.	"Graal"	8:52
6.	"Anhedonia"	3:42
Total length:		52:05

== Personnel ==
=== Ne Obliviscaris ===
- Marc "Xenoyr" Campbell – harsh vocals, lyrics, artwork
- Tim Charles – clean vocals, violin, viola, keyboards
- Matt Klavins – guitars
- Benjamin Baret – guitars
- Martino Garattoni – bass
- Dan Presland – drums

=== Additional personnel ===
- Dalai Theofilopoulou – cello (tracks 1, 4)
- Alana K Vocal – additional vocals (track 1)
- Mark Lewis – mixing, mastering, production

== Charts ==
Chart performance for Exul
Chart (2023)	Peak position
Australian Digital Albums (ARIA)	12
Australian Physical Albums (ARIA)	52
UK Album Downloads (Official Charts)	51
