= A New Era of Corruption =

Studio album by Whitechapel
- Released: June 8, 2010
- Recorded: January 2010
- Studio: Audiohammer, Orlando, FL, US
- Genre: Deathcore
- Length: 41:26
- Label: Metal Blade
- Producer: Whitechapel, Jason Suecof

Whitechapel chronology
This Is Exile (2008)	A New Era of Corruption (2010)	Recorrupted (2011)

Professional ratings
Review scores
Source	Rating
About.com	2/5 stars
AllMusic	3/5 stars
AltSounds	43%
Blabbermouth.net	8/10
Rock Sound	8/10

A New Era of Corruption is the third studio album by American deathcore band Whitechapel. It was released worldwide on June 8, 2010, through Metal Blade Records. In the USA, just under 10,700 copies were sold in the first week, placing it at No. 43 on the Billboard 200 chart. This is the last Whitechapel album to feature drummer Kevin Lane.

== History and background ==
The recording session for A New Era of Corruption ran from December 27, 2009, to January 2010 with Jason Suecof being the chosen producer. It was announced that the album's recording was completely finished on March 31, 2010. Guitarist Alex Wade said, "I think this record truly represents where we are as musicians at this point in our career. A New Era of Corruption is the heaviest and most aggressive material we have written to date." In the same interview, Wade confirmed the release of the album would be on June 8, 2010.

The name of the album is derived from a passage of the lyrics in their song "Possession" which appeared on their previous album, This Is Exile. The album makes A New Era of Corruption the first Whitechapel album that does not have a title track. Chino Moreno of Deftones and Vincent Bennett of The Acacia Strain make guest appearances on the album, Moreno in the song "Reprogrammed to Hate" and Bennett in "Murder Sermon".

== Lyrical themes ==
The concepts and lyrical themes of A New Era of Corruption travel into new boundaries and details where previous Whitechapel albums did not. With The Somatic Defilement being a narrative of Jack the Ripper and This Is Exile containing political and anti-religious themes, A New Era of Corruption is the first Whitechapel release that is not a concept album. It generally focuses on negative themes, for example "Devolver" is written within the concept of the devolution in society and how it has crafted "violent and hateful" individuals, while "Breeding Violence" was written about the increasing corruption in society during the post-9/11 times, and "Animus" is about the death of vocalist Phillip Bozeman's mother.

== Track listing ==
All lyrics are written by Phil Bozeman.

No.	Title	Music	Length
1.	"Devolver"	Ben Savage	3:58
2.	"Breeding Violence"	Savage	3:19
3.	"The Darkest Day of Man"	Savage	3:00
4.	"Reprogrammed to Hate"	Savage, Alex Wade	3:45
5.	"End of Flesh"	Savage, Wade, Zach Householder	4:03
6.	"Unnerving"	Householder	3:39
7.	"A Future Corrupt"	Savage	2:57
8.	"Prayer of Mockery"	Savage	3:35
9.	"Murder Sermon"	Wade, Householder	3:59
10.	"Necromechanical"	Savage, Bozeman	4:21
11.	"Single File to Dehumanization"	Savage	4:43
Total length:			41:26

Digital and vinyl bonus track
No.	Title	Music	Length
12.	"Animus"	Savage	3:35
Total length:			44:52

== Credits ==
Production and performance credits are adapted from the album liner notes.

=== Personnel ===
Whitechapel

- Phil Bozeman – vocals
- Ben Savage – lead guitar
- Alex Wade – guitar
- Zach Householder – guitar
- Gabe Crisp – bass
- Kevin Lane – drums

Guest musicians

- Vincent Bennett (The Acacia Strain) – vocals on "Murder Sermon"
- Chino Moreno (Deftones) – vocals on "Reprogrammed to Hate"
- Cole Martinez – additional sound design, sampling
- Jason Suecof – guitar solos on "A Future Corrupt" and "Necromechanical"

Production

- Mark Lewis – recording (drums)
- Whitechapel – production
- Jason Suecof – production, mixing, engineering
- Alan Douches – mastering
- Shaun Lopez – recording (Chino Moreno vocals)

Artwork and design

- Brent Elliott White – artwork
- Whitechapel – art direction

=== Studios ===
- Audiohammer, Orlando, FL, US – recording, mixing
- West West Side Music – mastering
- The Airport Studios, Burbank, CA, US – recording (Chino Moreno vocals)
- Conquistador Recording Studios – additional Sound design, sampling

== Charts ==
Chart performance
Chart (2010)	Peak position
Canadian Albums (Nielsen SoundScan)	74
US Billboard 200	43
US Independent Albums (Billboard)	3
US Top Hard Rock Albums (Billboard)	5
US Top Rock Albums (Billboard)	12
US Top Tastemaker Albums (Billboard)	18
