= Urn (album) =

Studio album by Ne Obliviscaris
- Released: 27 October 2017
- Recorded: March−May 2017
- Studio: Pony Music (Melbourne, Australia)
- Genre: Extreme metal; progressive metal
- Length: 45:54
- Label: Season of Mist
- Producer: Troy McCosker; Mark Lewis; Ne Obliviscaris

Ne Obliviscaris chronology
Citadel (2014)	Urn (2017)	Exul (2023)

Singles from Urn
- 1. "Intra Venus" Released: 27 July 2017

Professional ratings
Review scores
Source	Rating
AllMusic	3.5/5 stars
Metal Injection	6.5/10
PopMatters	8/10 stars
Teamrock	3/5 stars
Ultimate Guitar Archive	9/10

Urn is the third studio album by Australian progressive metal band Ne Obliviscaris, released on 27 October 2017 via Season of Mist. It was released to Patreon contributors a few days earlier. It is the first album not to feature former bassist Brendan "Cygnus" Brown, who left the band in early 2017 due to his allegations of domestic violence. Robin Zielhorst, former member of Cynic and Exivious, was recruited as their session bassist for the album.

The first single from the album, "Intra Venus", was released on 27 July 2017, accompanying a music video. On 29 August 2017, the band released another song, "Urn (Part I) – And Within the Void We Are Breathless". The third song, "Urn (Part II) – As Embers Dance in Our Eyes" was made available for streaming on 10 October 2017.

== Track listing ==
All lyrics are written by Xenoyr; all music is composed by Ne Obliviscaris

No.	Title	Length
1.	"Libera": I. "Part I: Saturnine Spheres"; II. "Part II: Ascent of Burning Moths"	12:27 9:52 2:35
2.	"Intra Venus"	7:28
3.	"Eyrie"	11:51
4.	"Urn": I. "Part I: And Within the Void We Are Breathless"; II. "Part II: As Embers Dance in Our Eyes""	14:08 7:30 6:38
Total length:		45:54

== Personnel ==
Credits are adapted from the album's liner notes.

Ne Obliviscaris

- Tim Charles – clean vocals, violin
- Xenoyr – harsh vocals
- Matt Klavins – guitars, egg shaker (track 3)
- Benjamin Baret – lead guitar
- Daniel Presland – drums

Additional musicians

- Robin Zielhorst – bass guitar
- Tim Hennessy – cello (tracks 1, 3, 4, 6)
- Emma Charles – violin (additional; tracks 1, 4, 6)
- Natalija May – violin (additional; tracks 1, 4, 6)
- Alana K Vocal, Alex Beckitt, Alex Hutchinson, Alex Koumoundouros, Alex Van Blyderveen, Alex Warren, Alexander Jackson, Amy Di Giambattista, Andrew Shugg, Cory Atkinson, Elisa Alleblas, Jacob James, James Wingfield, Karlo Doroc, Lewis Allan, Matthew Holmes, Meredith Rouse, Mitchell Shine, Nerrilee Morale, Xavier Beckitt – choir vocals (track 1)

Production and design

- Troy McCosker − producer, engineering
- Ne Obliviscaris − co-producer
- Mark Lewis − producer (clean vocals), engineering (clean vocals), re-amping (guitar), mixing, mastering
- Xenoyr − artwork

== Charts ==
Chart performance for Urn
Chart (2017)	Peak position
Australian Albums (ARIA)	35
