= Order of Ennead (album) =

Studio album by Order of Ennead
- Released: 11 November 2008
- Genre: Blackened death metal
- Length: 47:15
- Label: Earache Records
- Producer: Mark Lewis, Steve Asheim

Order of Ennead chronology
Order of Ennead (2008)	An Examination of Being (2010)

Order of Ennead is the self-titled debut studio album of Tampa based blackened death metal band, Order of Ennead. It was recorded at AudioHammer Studios in Sanford, Florida with producer Mark Lewis.

== Track listing ==
- All songs written & arranged by Order of Ennead.

No.	Title	Length
1.	"Seeking the Prophets"	3:54
2.	"Reflection, An Endless Endeavor"	3:19
3.	"As Long As I Have Myself, I Am Not Alone"	4:38
4.	"The Culling"	4:30
5.	"Introspection and the Loss of Denial"	3:29
6.	"Conferring With Demons"	3:48
7.	"As If a Rose I Wither"	3:40
8.	"Interlude With Reason"	1:42
9.	"A Cry To the Perilous Sun"	3:40
10.	"Prelude to Ruin"	1:36
11.	"Dismantling an Empire"	5:59

== Personnel ==
- Kevin Quirion – vocals, lead & rhythm guitar
- John Li – lead & rhythm guitars
- Scott Patrick – bass
- Steve Asheim – drums, percussion, piano, additional acoustic guitars

== Production ==
- Produced by Mark Lewis & Steve Asheim
- Recorded, engineered & mixed by Mark Lewis
- Mastered by Jim Morris

== Reception ==
Eduardo Rivadavia of AllMusic described the album as "one of the more pleasantly surprising American extreme metal debuts of the year."
