= A Different Breed of Killer =

American deathcore band

- Origin: Knoxville, Tennessee, United States
- Genres: Deathcore
- Years active: 2006–2010, 2012–2013, 2016–2017
- Label: Rise
- Members: Ethan Brown; Nija Walker; Trevor McKee; Louie Thal; Kevin Bivins
- Past members: Patrick Hamilton; Kyle McNulty; Klint Monroe; Nathan Palmer; Jesse Mainor
- Website: Facebook

A Different Breed of Killer was an American deathcore band from Knoxville, Tennessee. They released their debut album, I, Colossus, on April 29, 2008.

== History ==
Formed in October 2006, A Different Breed of Killer made a name for themselves in the deathcore scene. Less than a year after their formation, the band signed with Rise Records and released I, Colossus, which received generally positive reviews. The band has toured with Whitechapel, Through the Eyes of the Dead, and Impending Doom.

A Different Breed Of Killer announced their second full-length to be titled The city. The album would be produced by the band's drummer Nija Walker, who has been a student of recording technologies for eight years, and worked under mastering engineer Seva at SoundCurrent Mastering in Knoxville, TN. The album would be mastered by Seva. Also unique to this recording is plans to record, mix and master the entire album in Dolby Digital 5.1 Surround sound. The band stated "to our knowledge this is the first time this process has been applied to a death metal record."

The band has announced that they have left Rise Records and are in the process of securing a new label for The City.

Some of the members later joined a band named Persaeus.

In 2016, the band announced that their new vocalist was Kevin Bivins of American deathcore bands Senor Bivins and What Lies Beneath. Bivins announced the album would be released soon and that he designed the artwork. On June 27, 2016, nearly eight years after the release of I, Colossus, the band announced that "The Devouring Storm", the single from their second album The city, would be released on July 9, with the full album supposedly coming in November 2016. The band started an Indiegogo campaign to fund the album. The album was released on May 27, 2017. The band's last Facebook post was on August 12, 2017. There has been no band activity since.

== Band Members ==
=== Final Line-Up ===
- Nija Walker– drums (2006–2017)
- Louie Thal – bass guitar (2007–2017)
- Ethan Brown - guitar (2006–2017)
- Kevin Bivins - vocals (2016–2017)
- Trevor McKee – guitar, vocals (2006-2008, 2016–2017)

=== Former Members ===
- Patrick Hamilton - vocals (2006-2007)
- Klint Monroe - vocals (2008-2010)
- Kyle McNulty – bass guitar (2006-2007)
- Nathan Palmer - guitar (2008-2010)
- Jesse Mainor – vocals (2006-2008, 2012, 2016–2017)

== Discography ==
Studio albums

- I, Colossus (2008)
- The City (2017)

Demos

- 07 Demo (2007)
