= Citadel (Ne Obliviscaris album) =

Studio album by Ne Obliviscaris
- Released: 7 November 2014
- Genre: Extreme metal; progressive metal
- Length: 48:12
- Label: Season of Mist

Ne Obliviscaris chronology
Portal of I (2012)	Citadel (2014)	Urn (2017)

Professional ratings
Review scores
Source	Rating
SF Media	4.5/5 stars

Citadel is the second studio album by Australian progressive metal band Ne Obliviscaris. It was released worldwide on 7 November 2014 and November 11 in North America, marking their first release through Season of Mist records.

It is the last album to feature Brendan "Cygnus" Brown, who was released from the band in January 2017, thus marking the end of the steady line-up the band had since their first album.

== Track listing ==
All lyrics are written by Xenoyr.

No.	Title	Music	Length
1.	"Painters of the Tempest": I. "(Part I): Wyrmholes" (3:08); II. "(Part II): Triptych Lux" (16:35); a). "Creator" (7:21); b). "Cynosure" (3:40); c). "Curator" (5:34); III. "(Part III): Reveries from the Stained Glass Womb" (3:35); "	Charles, Baret, Xenoyr, Presland, Klavins, Brown	23:18
2.	"Pyrrhic"	Baret, Xenoyr, Presland, Klavins, Brown, Charles	9:50
3.	"Devour Me, Colossus": I. "(Part I): Blackholes" (12:37); II. "(Part II): Contortions" (2:27); "	Baret, Xenoyr, Presland, Klavins, Brown, Charles	15:04
Total length:			48:12

== Personnel ==
Ne Obliviscaris

- Tim Charles – clean vocals, violin, production
- Xenoyr – harsh vocals
- Matt Klavins – guitar
- Benjamin Baret – lead guitar
- Brendan "Cygnus" Brown – bass guitar
- Daniel Presland – drums

Additional personnel

- Emma Charles – additional violins (tracks 1 and 2)
- Timothy Hennessy – cello (tracks 1, 2 and 6)
- Troy McCosker – audio engineering, production
- Jens Bogren – mixing, mastering
- Anthony Iorio – additional audio engineering
- Svartwerk – art and layout

== Charts ==
Chart performance for Citadel
Chart (2014)	Peak position
Australian Albums (ARIA)	42
