= Portal of I =

Studio album by Ne Obliviscaris
- Released: May 7, 2012
- Genre: Extreme metal; progressive metal
- Length: 71:40
- Label: Code666

Ne Obliviscaris chronology
Portal of I (2012)	Citadel (2014)

Professional ratings
Review scores
Source	Rating
Metal Injection	9.5/10
Metal Obsession	10/10
Sputnikmusic	4.5/5 stars
Heavy Blog Is Heavy	4.5/5 stars

Portal of I is the debut studio album by Australian progressive metal band Ne Obliviscaris. It was released on May 7, 2012, via Code666 Records.

== Track listing ==
All music by Ne Obliviscaris. All lyrics by Xenoyr.

No.	Title	Length
1.	"Tapestry of the Starless Abstract"	12:00
2.	"Xenoflux"	9:58
3.	"Of the Leper Butterflies"	5:53
4.	"Forget Not"	12:02
5.	"And Plague Flowers the Kaleidoscope"	11:32
6.	"As Icicles Fall"	9:24
7.	"Of Petrichor Weaves Black Noise"	10:41
Total length:		71:40

== Personnel ==
Ne Obliviscaris

- Tim Charles – clean vocals, violin, production
- Xenoyr – harsh vocals, lyrics, cover art
- Matt Klavins – guitar, acoustic guitar
- Benjamin Baret – guitar, acoustic guitar
- Brendan "Cygnus" Brown – bass
- Daniel Presland – drums

Additional personnel

- Troy McCosker – audio engineering, production
- Jens Bogren – mixing
- Ken Sorceron – vinyl remastering
