= An Examination of Being =

Studio album by Order of Ennead
- Released: 4 May 2010
- Genre: Blackened death metal
- Length: 39:52
- Label: Earache Records
- Producer: Mark Lewis

Order of Ennead chronology
| Order of Ennead (2008) | An Examination of Being (2010) |

Professional ratings
Review scores
| Source | Rating |
|---|---|
| AllMusic | link |
| Sputnikmusic | (3.3/5) link |

An Examination of Being is the second studio album of Tampa based blackened death metal band, Order of Ennead. It was recorded at AudioHammer Studios in Sanford, Florida with producer Mark Lewis.

== Track listing ==
| No. | Title | Length |
|---|---|---|
| 1. | "The Concept of Our Extinction" | 4:17 |
| 2. | "The Scriptures of Purification" | 4:03 |
| 3. | "Lies Upon the Lips of Judas" | 4:10 |
| 4. | "This Mortal Journey" | 4:52 |
| 5. | "...In the Mirror" | 3:55 |
| 6. | "An Examination of Being" | 3:39 |
| 7. | "Conduits to Eternity" | 4:10 |
| 8. | "A Portal to Rapture" | 5:22 |
| 9. | "A Betrayal of Self" | 5:24 |

== Personnel ==
- Steve Asheim – drums, percussion
- Kevin Quirion – vocals, rhythm guitar
- Scott Patrick – bass guitar
- John Li – lead guitar
