= Order of Ennead =

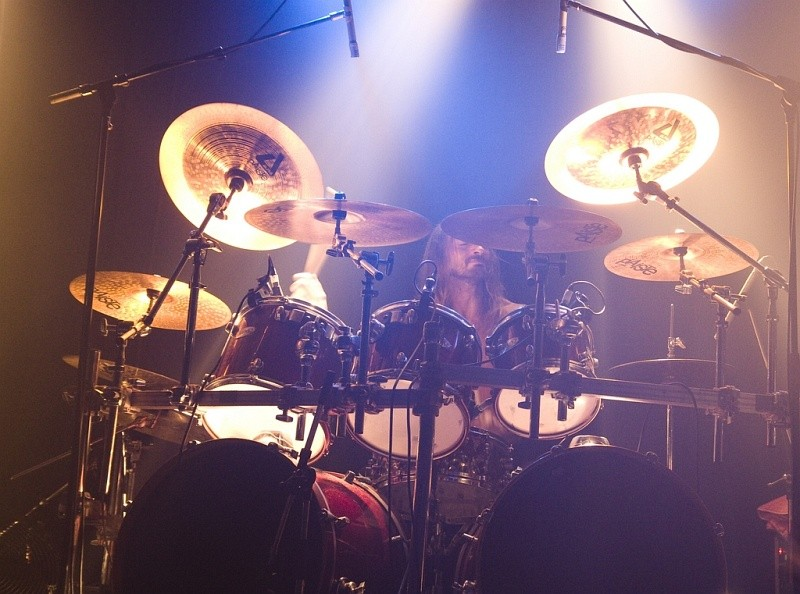

Background information
- Origin: Tampa, Florida, United States
- Genres: Blackened death metal

Order of Ennead is an American extreme metal band formed in Tampa, Florida. It includes two members of the death metal band Deicide, and the student of a former guitarist of the band. Order of Ennead have released two albums to date.

== History ==
Order Of Ennead was formed in the fall of 1997 under the banner of the now defunct Council Of The Fallen. Following Kevin Quirion's hiatus from Council Of The Fallen in 2006, and, with Deicide on hiatus, in late 2006, Scott Patrick began jamming with Steve Asheim on a more straightforward rock project. In summer 2007, Patrick played the preproduction for the next Council album for Steve, relaying that Derek Roddy had exited earlier the previous year and that the material was top notch but called for a high-caliber drummer to step up. With Asheim interested, Patrick met with Quirion at a Vital Remains show and relayed that Asheim would like to jam the preproduction songs.

In September 2007, the trio had their first practice. In late 2007, Patrick's long time friend Santiago Dobles performed the leads for the demo, which would become the first Order Of Ennead record (only 50 official copies of the demo exist).

Following their signing to Earache Records in early 2008, Santiago Dobles was replaced with Patrick's friend John Li (who jammed with Council in 2006) due to scheduling conflicts with Santiago’s primary act Aghora. At Earache Records' request, at the time of the signing, the band officially changed its name from "Council Of The Fallen" to "Order Of Ennead". When the band originally began working together, they had been working under the band name "Council of the Fallen", but they decided that they would take on a new name, since it became an entirely new project for all.

While in the United Kingdom, Asheim was reading up on ancient mythology and suggested the name Ennead from a mythology of nine Egyptian deities. In November 2008, the band released their self-titled debut album, with their second album, An Examination of Being, released in May 2010, both to warm critical reception and both on the Earache Records label.

When Li was not available for touring, Jack Owen, the former guitarist of Deicide, took over.

== Musical style ==
Order of Ennead are noted for their experimental nature within their songwriting. While maintaining the heaviness of death and black metal, many songs include elements such as odd time signatures, clean and ambient sections and melodic guitar solos & melodies.

== Members ==
Current

- Steve Asheim – drums, acoustic guitar, piano
- Kevin Quirion – vocals, rhythm guitar
- Scott Patrick – bass
- John Li – lead guitar

Tour

- Jack Owen – lead guitar

== Discography ==
=== Studio albums ===
- Order of Ennead (2008)
- An Examination of Being (2010)
