= Ne Obliviscaris (band) =

Australian progressive metal band

- Ne Obliviscaris performing in Tokyo in 2015

Background information
- Origin: Melbourne, Australia
- Genres: Progressive metal; extreme metal
- Years active: 2003–present
- Label: Season of Mist
- Members: Tim Charles; Matt Klavins; Benjamin Baret; Martino Garattoni; Daniel Presland; James Dorton
- Past members: Nelson Barnes; Corey King; Corey Baker; Sherri-Jesse; Adam Boddy; Adam Cooper; Brendan "Cygnus" Brown; Kevin Paradis; Marc "Xenoyr" Campbell
- Website: neobliviscaris.com.au

Ne Obliviscaris (Latin for "forget not"; Clan Campbell motto) is a six-piece Australian progressive metal band from Melbourne. Formed initially as a four-piece in April 2003, the group was founded by Marc "Xenoyr" Campbell and Adam Cooper. The current line-up comprises violinist and clean vocalist Tim Charles, guitarists Matt Klavins and Benjamin Baret, bassist Martino Garattoni, drummer Dan Presland, and harsh vocalist James Dorton. To date, the band has released a demo, two extended plays and four studio albums. Their most recent album, Exul, was released on 24 March 2023.

== History ==
=== Formation and early years (2003–2012) ===
Ne Obliviscaris were formed in April 2003 by vocalist Xenoyr and bassist Adam Cooper, later adding a second guitarist and a female soprano. Current vocalist/violinist Tim Charles followed in September 2003. The band went through a number of line-up changes before releasing an independent demo, The Aurora Veil, in 2007. The demo featured three songs which would later appear on their debut album. Their music, whilst being firmly rooted in extreme metal, shows influences from a range of musical styles, including death, black, thrash and melodic metal, as well as classical, jazz, avant-garde and flamenco.

Drummer Dan Presland left the band in early 2010 shortly after recording his parts for the bands debut album 'Portal of I' and was eventually replaced by Nelson Barnes in early 2012. However, due to the distance between Queensland and Melbourne, Ne Obliviscaris parted ways with Barnes and Presland's return to the band was announced on 24 August 2012.

=== Portal of I (2012–2014) ===
Released 7 May 2012, Portal of I was the first full-length album by the band. The release of the album was delayed due to the departure of their guitarist, Corey King, in 2007 and the search for a replacement. Benjamin Baret later joined as the lead guitarist, but was subject to lengthy delays in his visa application process.

The album received generally positive reviews with Metal Injection praising the composition and the musicianship of the album.

The band toured in support of the album, which took them overseas for the first time, with the band playing in Japan, China, Taiwan, Hong Kong and Thailand. They were also the headlining act for Progfest 2012 around Australia.

And Plague Flowers The Kaleidoscope from Portal of I was included in a teaching curriculum at Sydney Conservatorium of Music, the song being analyzed for its composition.

=== Citadel and Brown's firing (2014–2017) ===
Recorded during 2013, Citadel was released through Seasons of Mist on 7 November 2014. The album reached number 42 on the ARIA Albums Chart.

The album was generally well received, with Metal Hammer giving it a four out of five rating. Metal Injection again praised the complexity of the arrangements.

In June 2014, the band announced a crowdfunding campaign to support a world tour with an initial target of $40,000 AUD. This target was reached in just two days, reaching a final figure of $86,132 AUD and breaking the Australian record for crowd-funding in the process.

The subsequent world tour saw Ne Obliviscaris return to Asia supporting Fleshgod Apocalypse as well as their first tours of Europe, the UK and North America where they supported British band, Cradle of Filth. They also played in India for the first time, where they headlined the B-School of Rock at the Unmaad Festival in Bangalore.

In July 2016, the band began a headlining tour of North America. with headlining shows in the U.K and Ireland following in October 2016 with Atlanta-based band Oceans of Slumber as support. Also announced were further European tour supporting Enslaved between September and November 2016, and headline shows in Australia at the end of November and beginning of December 2016.

On 26 January 2017, the band released longtime bassist Brendan "Cygnus" Brown following allegations of domestic violence. Although they initially gave "irreconcilable personal differences" as the reason, they later explained that it was due in part to the allegations, but also because they believed that Brown needed help. Following accusations from a website that the band knew about Brown's violent behavior and had been hiding it for years, the band explained that they were only aware of a domestic incident between Brown and his mother six years prior, and, after discovering the truth, immediately tried to get Brown to get help, and relieved him of his services to the band. Brown confirmed both the allegations and the band's statement to be true, adding that being released made him "realize the extent of damage I have caused to people over the years and how badly I need to get help to get my life back on track." He also stated that he had been physically and sexually abused by his mother since childhood, and that the trauma, which caused mental health disorders and ended in drug abuse, made him "an unpredictable character at times, and I have lashed out at people close to me both physically and verbally. I am deeply sorry to anybody that has been victim to this inexcusable behavior". He also explained that the domestic violence incident with his mother six years prior was him fighting her back for the first time, and that he had not spoken to her since despite his mother harassing both him, his girlfriend, and the band on several occasions, which had led them to complain to the police.

=== Urn and Exul (2017–present) ===
On 26 July 2017, the band announced that their new album, Urn, would be released on 27 October 2017, and released a music video for the track "Intra Venus". They also announced Robin Zielhorst, former member of Cynic, Exivious, and Our Oceans, as their session bassist for the album. On 29 August 2017, they released another song from the album, "Urn (Part I) – And Within the Void We Are Breathless". On 10 October 2017, they released another song, "Urn (Part II) – As Embers Dance In Our Eyes". Urn released on 27 October 2017, though it had been released to Patreon contributors a few days earlier.

On 22 June 2019 it was announced that the band's track, Intra Venus won the 2018 Independent Music Award for Best Metal / Hardcore song.

On 31 December 2019, their publisher Season of Mist announced that they would be releasing a new album in 2020, which was later delayed to 2021, and then 2022 due to the COVID-19 lockdowns.

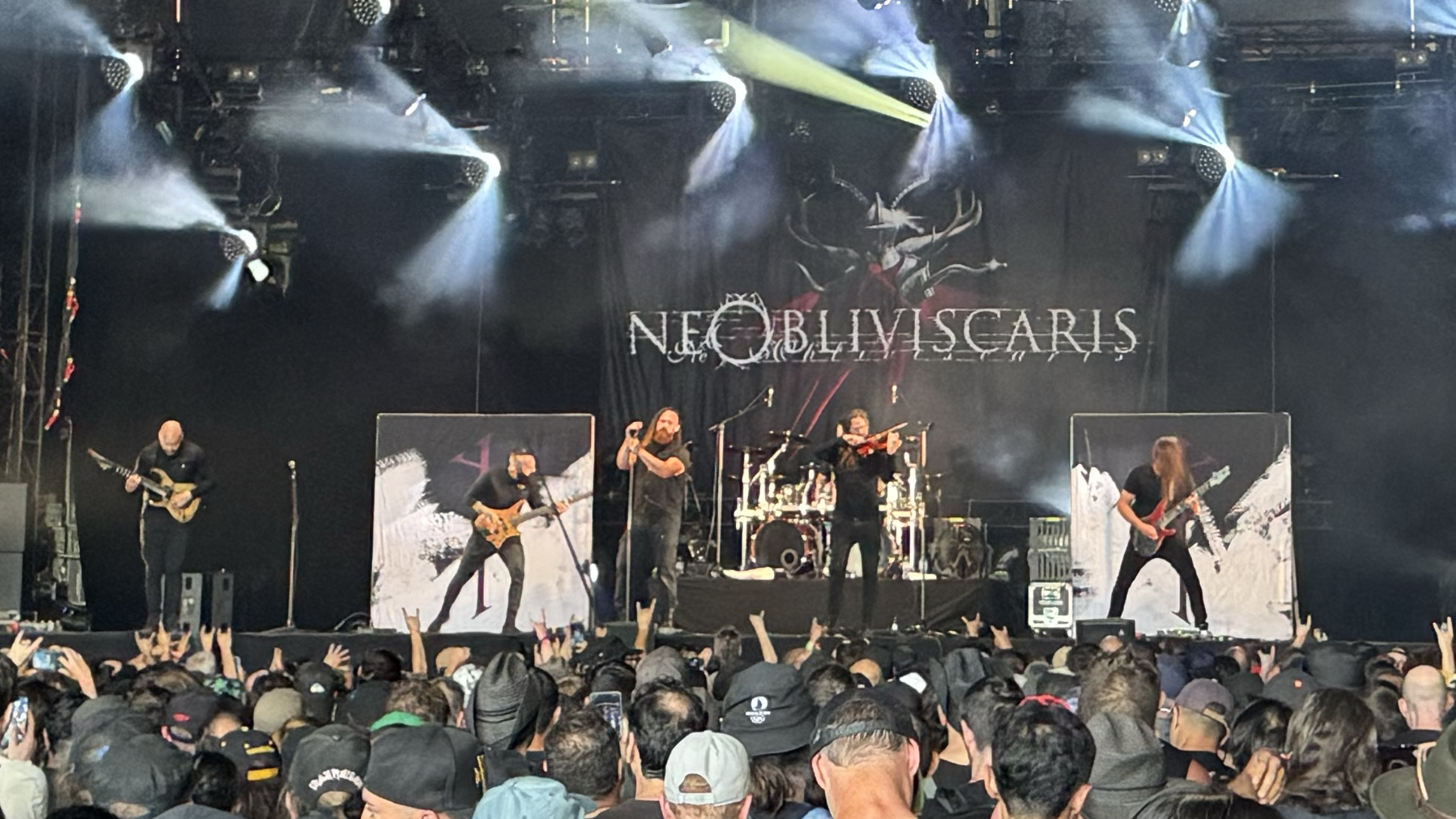
At Hellfest, France, in June 2024

On 7 July 2022, the band announced on Facebook that the recording for their new album had been finished. On 1 December 2022, the band announced their fourth album, Exul, would be released on 24 March 2023. The first single from the album, "Equus", was released on 6 December 2022, alongside an accompanying music video.

On January 28, 2025, the band announced on Facebook that the long-time harsh vocalist Xenoyr would be leaving the band after 22 years. His replacement is James Dorton, lead vocalist of Black Crown Initiate, who had been a guest replacement for Xenoyr on all of the band's live performances.

== Use of crowdfunding ==
In addition to the campaign to fund their world tour, the band announced in March 2016 that they were starting a subscription based service through the Patreon micro-payments platform. This was in part inspired by Thy Art is Murder frontman, CJ McMahon, quitting the band for financial reasons. The decision to use Patreon generated some controversy on social media platforms to which vocalist and violinist Tim Charles responded.

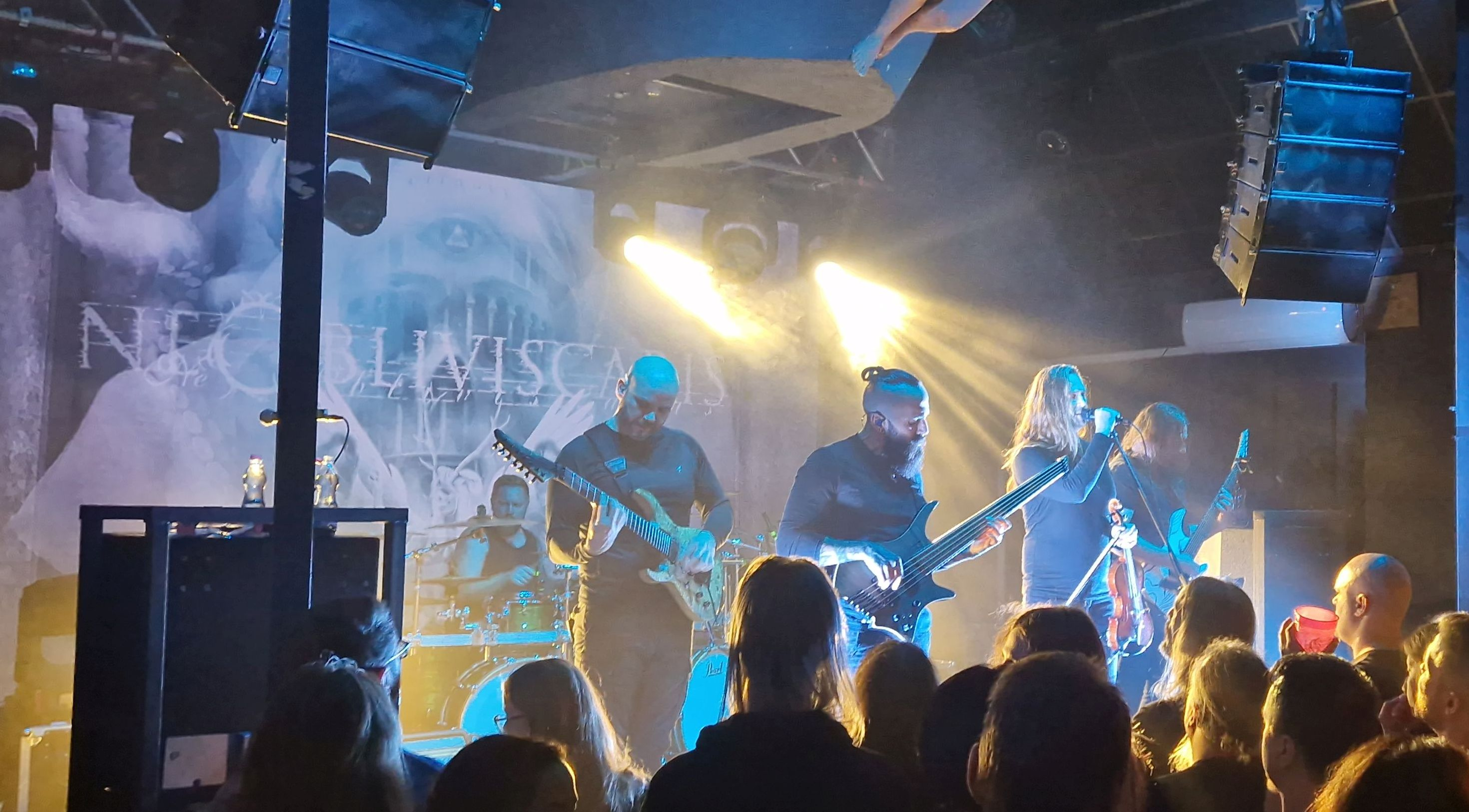
Ne Obliviscaris performing in Budapest, Hungary, in October 2024

"Backstage in dressing rooms the world over I have had discussions with soooo many bands about the brutal reality of the music industry- that almost all the bands that you love are either in debt, or struggling. Many bands break up because it is simply too difficult a lifestyle to maintain and fans are always up in arms when a band they love calls it a day. Well, rather than accept our fate as a mid level band destined to not make a dollar we have decided to take the initiative to change the course of our future for the better."

== Band members ==
=== Current ===
- Tim Charles – violin (2003–present), clean vocals (2004–present)
- Matt Klavins – rhythm guitar (2004–present)
- Benjamin Baret – lead guitar (2008–present)
- Martino Garattoni – bass (2017–present), backing vocals (2023–present)
- Daniel Presland – drums (2005–2009, 2012–2021, 2024–present)
- James Dorton – harsh vocals (2025–present; session 2023–2024)

=== Former ===
- Sheri-Jesse Tantawy – clean vocals (2003–2004)
- Adam Boddy – guitar (2003–2004)
- Adam Cooper – bass (2003–2004)
- Corey Baker – drums (2003–2004)
- Corey King – guitar (2004–2007)
- Nelson Barnes – drums (2012)
- Brendan "Cygnus" Brown – bass (2004–2017)
- Kevin Paradis – drums (2023–2024)
- Marc "Xenoyr" Campbell – harsh vocals (2003–2025)

=== Session ===
- Robin Zielhorst – bass (studio, 2017)
- Ludovico Cioffi – rhythm guitar (2019)

== Discography ==
Studio albums

- Portal of I (2012)
- Citadel (2014)
- Urn (2017)
- Exul (2023)

Extended plays

- The Aurora Veil (2007) – demo
- Sarabande to Nihil (2015) – re-recordings of earlier material from 2004–2005
- Hiraeth (2015) – re-recordings of earlier material from 2004–2005
