= The Valley (Whitechapel album) =

2019 studio album by Whitechapel

Studio album by Whitechapel
- Released: March 29, 2019
- Recorded: 2018
- Genre: Deathcore; progressive metal; groove metal
- Length: 40:33
- Label: Metal Blade
- Producer: Mark Lewis

Whitechapel chronology
| Mark of the Blade (2016) | The Valley (2019) | Kin (2021) |

Singles from The Valley
- 1. "Brimstone" Released: November 1, 2018; 2. "Black Bear" Released: December 13, 2018; 3. "Third Depth" Released: January 15, 2019; 4. "When a Demon Defiles a Witch" Released: February 20, 2019; 5. "Hickory Creek" Released: March 21, 2019; 6. "Doom Woods" Released: June 25, 2020

The Valley is the seventh studio album by American deathcore band Whitechapel. It was released through Metal Blade Records on March 29, 2019 to very positive reviews. Loudwire named it one of the 50 best metal albums of 2019.

On April 14, 2020, an acoustic version of "Hickory Creek" was released. It marks the first Whitechapel song to include entirely clean vocals.

== Composition ==
The Valley is a concept album based on vocalist and writer Phil Bozeman's childhood; the title is a reference to Hardin Valley, Tennessee, where Bozeman grew up. His father, Michael Gary Bozeman, suddenly died on December 30, 1995, when Phil was ten. His mother, Theresa, already struggled with alcoholism and schizophrenia; the album's opening song, "When a Demon Defiles a Witch", is an interpretation of one of her visions she wrote down in a journal entry. Theresa eventually remarried, but Bozeman's step-father was abusive toward both of them, with Phil referring to the man as a "predator" and holding him responsible for introducing his mother to crack cocaine. Theresa eventually died from a drug overdose in 2000.

The Valley continues Bozeman's experiments with clean vocals, and slightly distances Whitechapel from their signature deathcore style. The vocals on the fourth track, "Hickory Creek", are almost exclusively sung. As a whole, the record has been variously described as deathcore, progressive metal, and groove metal. The band's follow-up album, Kin, continues Bozeman's story, and features much more extensive use of singing.

Professional ratings
Review scores
| Source | Rating |
|---|---|
| Consequence of Sound | B+ |
| Exclaim! | 9/10 |
| Kerrang! | 4/5 stars |
| MetalSucks | 4.5/5 stars |
| Metal Injection | 9/10 |

== Track listing ==
| No. | Title | Length |
|---|---|---|
| 1. | "When a Demon Defiles a Witch" | 5:04 |
| 2. | "Forgiveness Is Weakness" | 2:55 |
| 3. | "Brimstone" | 3:25 |
| 4. | "Hickory Creek" | 4:56 |
| 5. | "Black Bear" | 3:08 |
| 6. | "We Are One" | 3:58 |
| 7. | "The Other Side" | 3:17 |
| 8. | "Third Depth" | 4:07 |
| 9. | "Lovelace" | 3:48 |
| 10. | "Doom Woods" | 5:51 |
| Total length: | | 40:33 |

Deluxe and vinyl bonus track
| No. | Title | Length |
|---|---|---|
| 11. | "Sea of Trees" | 2:29 |
| Total length: | | 42:58 |

== Personnel ==
Whitechapel

- Phil Bozeman – vocals
- Ben Savage – guitar
- Alex Wade – guitar
- Zach Householder – guitar
- Gabe Crisp – bass

Additional musicians

- Navene Koperweis – drums

Production

- Mark Lewis – production, engineering
- Ted Jensen – mastering
- David Castillo – mixing

Artwork and design

- Branca Studio – artwork, layout
- Phil Savage – photography

== Charts ==
| Chart (2019) | Peak position |
|---|---|
| Australian Digital Albums (ARIA) | 15 |
| Austrian Albums (Ö3 Austria) | 36 |
| German Albums (Offizielle Top 100) | 27 |
| Swiss Albums (Schweizer Hitparade) | 46 |
| US Billboard 200 | 143 |
| US Top Hard Rock Albums (Billboard) | 7 |
| US Top Rock Albums (Billboard) | 26 |
