= The Somatic Defilement =

Studio album by Whitechapel
- Released: July 31, 2007
- Recorded: 2007 at The Sound Lair in Knoxville, Tennessee
- Genre: Deathcore
- Length: 31:59
- Label: Candlelight (US), Siege of Amida (EUR), Metal Blade (reissue)
- Producer: Whitechapel, Miah Lajeunesse

Whitechapel chronology
Demo 2 (2006)	The Somatic Defilement (2007)	This Is Exile (2008)

Reissue cover
- The cover for the 2013 re-release of The Somatic Defilement.

Professional ratings
Review scores
Source	Rating
About.com	3.5/5 stars
AllMusic	3.5/5 stars
Rock Hard	8/10

The Somatic Defilement is the debut studio album by American deathcore band Whitechapel. The album was released on July 31, 2007, through Candlelight Records and is their only release through this label before their move to Metal Blade the following year. It is the only album to feature guitarist Brandon Cagle. The album was re-issued on April 16, 2013.

== Overview ==
The Somatic Defilement is mostly a concept album based on Jack the Ripper, in which the majority of the songs are first-person narratives of the slaughter and rape of prostitutes. Only two songs are exceptions to this theme: vocalist Phil Bozeman specified that "Alone in the Morgue" is about "a coroner who is a demented necrophiliac" and "Festering Fiesta" is about Jeffrey Dahmer. The intro track, "Necrotizing" also contains excerpts from a Stone Phillips interview with Dahmer.

The album is the only one by Whitechapel to include Brandon Cagle as guitarist. He later left the band due to injuries he received from a motorcycle accident which left him unable to play his instrument. He was replaced by Zach Householder.

== Reissue ==
A remixed and remastered edition of the album was released on April 16, 2013 through Metal Blade Records. Re-mixing and re-mastering duties were given to Mark Lewis, whom the band worked with since their self-titled release.

== Track listing ==
Tracks
No.	Title	Length
1.	"Necrotizing"	0:35
2.	"The Somatic Defilement"	5:19
3.	"Devirgination Studies"	3:12
4.	"Prostatic Fluid Asphyxiation"	3:33
5.	"Fairy Fay"	3:33
6.	"Ear to Ear"	3:30
7.	"Alone in the Morgue"	2:53
8.	"Festering Fiesta"	2:29
9.	"Vicer Exciser"	2:52
10.	"Articulo Mortis"	4:03
Total length:		31:59

== Personnel ==
Whitechapel

- Phil Bozeman – vocals
- Alex Wade – guitar
- Ben Savage – guitar
- Brandon Cagle – guitar
- Gabe Crisp – bass
- Kevin Lane – drums

Production

- Production by Miah Lajeunesse and Whitechapel
- Mixing and engineering by Miah Lajeunesse
- Mastering by Alan Douches
- A&R by Jamie Graham
