= This Is Exile =

Studio album by Whitechapel
- Released: July 8, 2008
- Recorded: March 2008
- Studios: Backyard Studios, Milford, NH, US
- Genre: Deathcore
- Length: 43:04
- Label: Metal Blade
- Producers: Whitechapel, Jonny Fay

Whitechapel chronology
The Somatic Defilement (2007)	This Is Exile (2008)	A New Era of Corruption (2010)

Professional ratings
Review scores
Source	Rating
AllMusic	3.5/5 stars
Rock Hard	8/10

This Is Exile is the second studio album by American deathcore band Whitechapel. It was produced by Jonny Fay and the band itself and was released on July 8, 2008 through Metal Blade Records. This is the band's first album to feature guitarist Zach Householder.

== Background ==
Upon the release of the record, its sales reached 5,900 in copies, which had it enter the Billboard Top 200 chart at position 118. Three music videos for songs from the album were released. The video for "This Is Exile" was released on June 18, 2008. The music video for "Possession" was released on November 18, 2008 and shown on MTV2's Headbangers Ball. The music video for "Eternal Refuge" was released on June 8, 2009.

The song "This Is Exile" is available as downloadable content for Rock Band 2. The song is also used in the iPod Touch game, Tap Tap Revenge 3.

== Themes ==
Lyrically, This Is Exile marked a shift in Whitechapel's thematic focus. Whereas the band’s early demos and debut album, The Somatic Defilement, centered on the Whitechapel murders, the record departs from those narrative concepts in favor of broader themes, including anti-religious subject matter and depictions of societal corruption. The latter thematic direction would be developed further on the band’s subsequent release.

== Reception ==
In 2021, Alternative Press included the album in his list of "30 deathcore albums from the 2000s that define the genre". That same year, Revolver included it in their list of "15 Essential Deathcore Albums", calling it "unequivocally crucial part deathcore’s developing years" along with The Cleansing by Suicide Silence. In 2024, Metal Injection included the album in their list of "10 Deathcore Albums That Aged Incredibly Well".

== Track listing ==
All lyrics are written by Phil Bozeman; all music is composed by Whitechapel.

No.	Title	Length
1.	"Father of Lies"	4:04
2.	"This Is Exile"	3:40
3.	"Possession"	5:04
4.	"To All That Are Dead"	3:38
5.	"Exalt" (featuring Guy Kozowyk)	3:06
6.	"Somatically Incorrect"	3:11
7.	"Death Becomes Him" (instrumental)	3:19
8.	"Daemon (The Procreated)"	3:13
9.	"Eternal Refuge"	3:42
10.	"Of Legions" (instrumental)	2:44
11.	"Messiahbolical"	7:23
Total length:		43:04

== Personnel ==
Production and performance credits are adapted from the album liner notes.

Whitechapel

- Phil Bozeman – vocals
- Ben Savage – lead guitar
- Alex Wade – guitar
- Zach Householder – guitar
- Gabe Crisp – bass
- Kevin Lane – drums

Featured artists

- Guy Kozowyk (The Red Chord) – vocals on "Exalt"

Production

- Jonny Fay – engineering, editing, tracking, production
- Whitechapel – production
- "Zeuss" – mixing, mastering

Artwork and design

- Colin Marks – artwork
- Whitechapel – artwork concept

=== Studios ===
- Backyard Studios in Milford, NH, US – tracking
- Planet Z, Hadley, MA, US – mixing, mastering

== Charts ==
Chart (2008)	Peak position
US Billboard 200	118
US Top Hard Rock Albums (Billboard)	13
US Heatseekers Albums (Billboard)	2
US Independent Albums (Billboard)	14
