= Whitechapel (band) =

American deathcore band

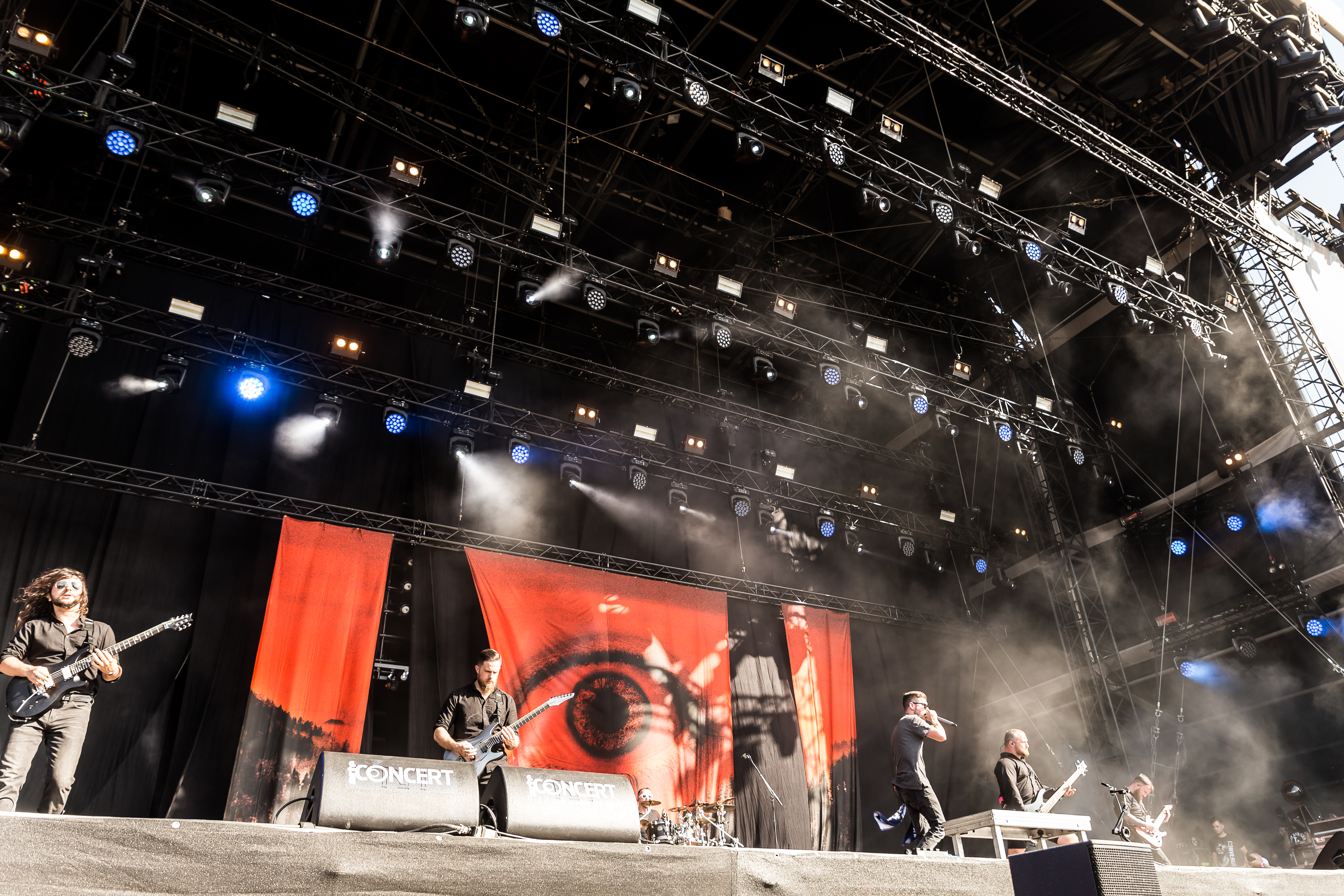
- Whitechapel performing at Full Force in 2019

Background information
- Origin: Knoxville, Tennessee, U.S.
- Genres: Deathcore; death metal; progressive metal; groove metal
- Years active: 2006–present
- Labels: Metal Blade; Candlelight; Siege of Amida
- Members: Phil Bozeman; Gabe Crisp; Ben Savage; Alex Wade; Zach Householder; Brandon Zackey
- Past members: Derek Martin; Brandon Cagle; Kevin Lane; Ben Harclerode
- Website: whitechapelband.com

Whitechapel is an American deathcore band from Knoxville, Tennessee. The band is named after the Whitechapel district in east London, England, where Jack the Ripper committed a series of murders. The group comprises vocalist Phil Bozeman, guitarists Ben Savage, Alex Wade, and Zach Householder, bassist Gabe Crisp and drummer Brandon Zackey. Their core lineup, with the exception of the drummer, has remained consistent since Householder replaced original guitarist Brandon Cagle in 2007. Founded in 2006 by Bozeman and Savage, the band has released nine studio albums and twenty-two music videos, and is currently signed to Metal Blade Records. Whitechapel's 2010 album A New Era of Corruption, sold around 10,600 copies in the United States in its first week of release and debuted at position No. 43 on the Billboard 200 chart. The band's self-titled fourth album was released in 2012 and debuted at No. 47 on the Billboard 200, selling roughly 9,200 copies in its first week. In 2014 the band released their fifth full-length album, Our Endless War to generally positive reviews. The album sold roughly 16,000 copies in its first week and debuted at No. 10 on the Billboard 200. They released their sixth full-length album Mark of the Blade in 2016 to greater critical acclaim, selling roughly 8,000 copies in the first week of its release. In 2019, Whitechapel released their seventh album, The Valley, which debuted at No. 143 on the Billboard 200 also to critical acclaim. Their newest album, Hymns in Dissonance, was released on March 7, 2025.

Loudwire designated Whitechapel as being among deathcore's "Big Four", along with Job for a Cowboy, Thy Art is Murder and Suicide Silence.

== History ==
=== Formation and The Somatic Defilement (2006–2007) ===
Whitechapel was founded in February 2006 by Knoxville residents Phil Bozeman, Brandon Cagle, and Ben Savage. They were soon joined by Alex Wade (formerly of Redwinterdying) as a guitarist, along with bassist, Gabe Crisp, and drummer, Derek Martin. The group recorded their first demos in March of that year. They named themselves after the Whitechapel district of London, where Jack the Ripper committed his murders. In 2007, the band signed to Siege of Amida Records in the United Kingdom, and Candlelight Records in North America. They were joined by new drummer Kevin Lane and released their debut full-length album The Somatic Defilement in June of the same year. Cagle had to leave the band after an unfortunate motorcycle accident left him unable to play guitar; Zach Householder was then brought in as replacement.

=== This Is Exile (2007–2010) ===
In October 2007, the group signed to Metal Blade Records, and in 2008 released their second album entitled This Is Exile. The album reached No. 118 in the Billboard Top 200. In May 2008, the band toured on The Summer Slaughter Tour, and in August 2008, they began their first ever headlining tour with Impending Doom, A Different Breed of Killer, and Through the Eyes of the Dead.

In 2008, they started touring with more popular bands such as Parkway Drive and Unearth on the Never Say Die! tour. They have produced a video for the song "Possession", along with one for "This Is Exile". Whitechapel has also toured on the Rockstar Mayhem Festival on the Hot Topic Stage along with the bands Job for a Cowboy, Cannibal Corpse, Behemoth and the Black Dahlia Murder, and alongside bands of the main stage such as Slayer and Marilyn Manson, who headlined the tour.

Whitechapel toured with Darkest Hour and Trivium on Trivium's 2009 and 2010 "Into the Mouth of Hell We March Tour".

=== A New Era of Corruption (2010–2011) ===
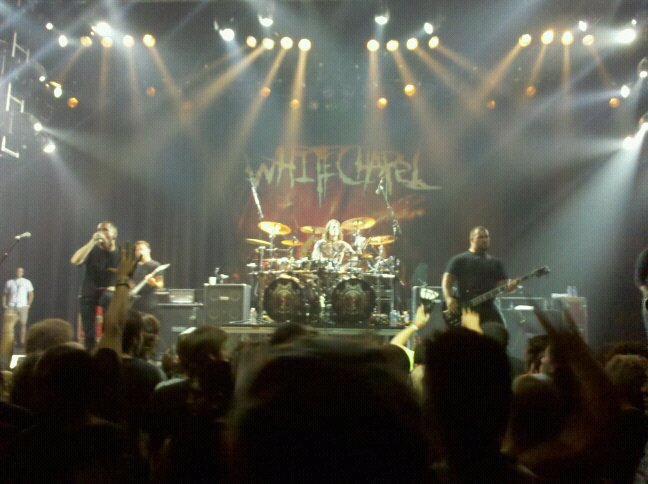
Whitechapel performing at The Grove of Anaheim on the 2011 Summer Slaughter Tour

Whitechapel recorded their follow-up album to This Is Exile from December 27 to March 31 with Jason Suecof as the chosen producer. The band early-on announced a summer 2010 release date for the record. The name of the album was later confirmed to be A New Era of Corruption. A song from A New Era of Corruption entitled, "The Darkest Day of Man" was performed live before the album's release. Months later it was released as streaming media online. A New Era of Corruption was released on June 8, 2010, sold around 10,600 copies in the United States in its first week of release and debuted at position No. 43 on the Billboard 200 chart.

Whitechapel's focus on mass exposure over their small, dedicated following has provided them with featured spots in both California Metal Fest IV and 2010's Warped Tour. They have also been announced to play Download festival in 2010, and will be a part of the second stage showcased. A headlining US tour with Impending Doom, Oceano, I Declare War and Miss May I was held before the end of November. During December 2010, drummer, Kevin Lane willingly left the group to return to college and due to his ankle not being on par and would hinder the band; former Knights of the Abyss drummer Benjamin Harclerode joined the band in Lane's replacement. A live music video for the song "Breeding Violence" was released February 7, 2011. Whitechapel did a US headlining tour titled "The Welcome to Hell Tour" with The Acacia Strain, Veil of Maya, Chelsea Grin and I Declare War throughout February and March 2011. This tour was followed by another headlining tour of the same name in Europe with The Acacia Strain as direct support and Impending Doom opening the show. Whitechapel also co-headlined the 2011 Summer Slaughter Tour, alongside The Black Dahlia Murder. In the fall and winter of 2011, Whitechapel embarked on a US tour with The Devil Wears Prada, For Today and Enter Shikari.

=== Recorrupted and Self-titled fourth album (2012–2013) ===
In September 28, Whitechapel released a new song titled "Section 8" and confirmed a limited edition EP titled Recorrupted; the EP was released on November 8, 2011.

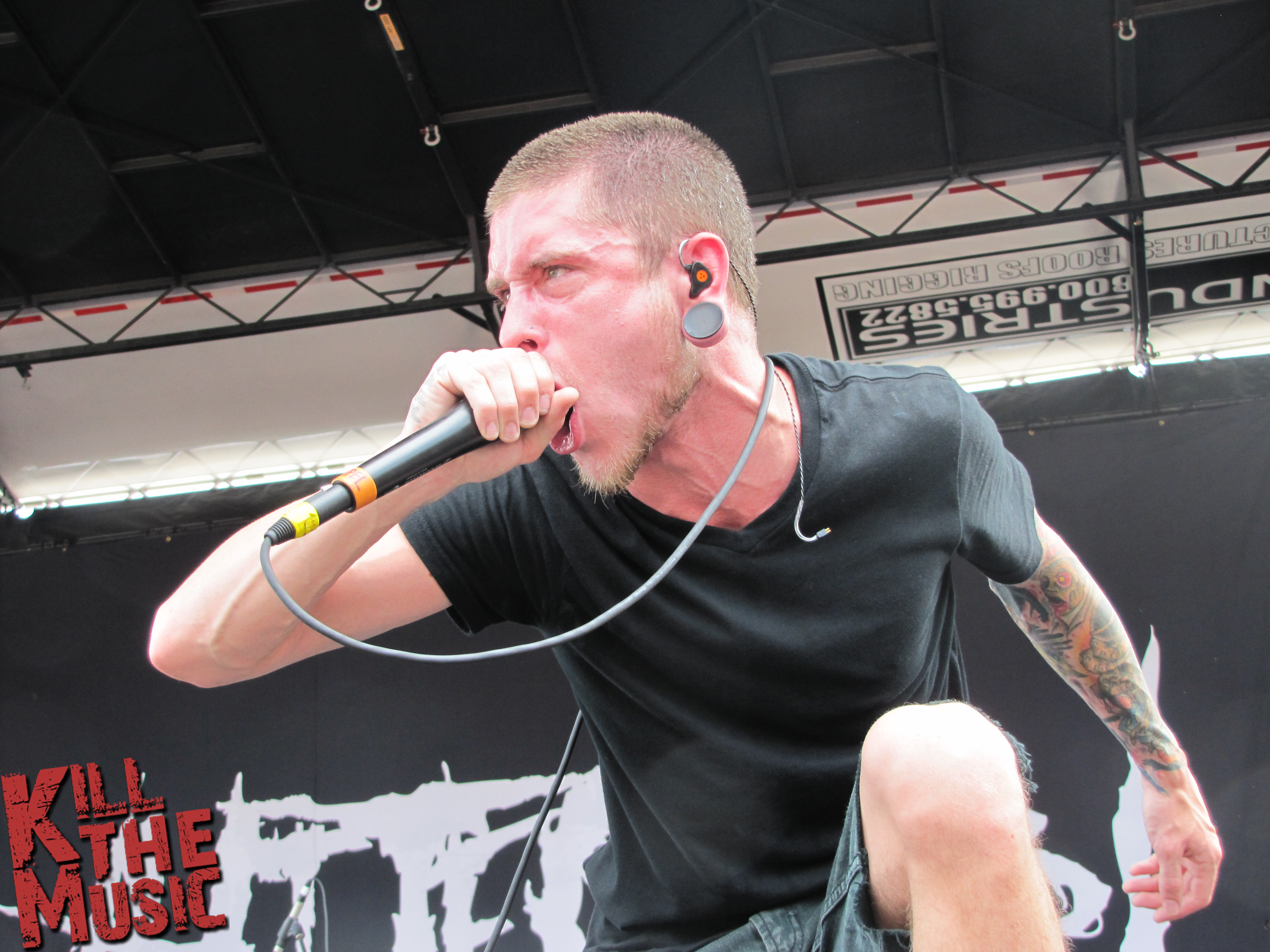
Vocalist Phil Bozeman performing at Mayhem Festival in 2012

Whitechapel undertook a US headlining tour titled "The Recorruptour" with Miss May I, After the Burial, Within the Ruins, The Plot in You and Structures throughout March and May 2012. Whitechapel also played the entire Mayhem Festival tour of 2012.

The band recorded their self-titled fourth album at Wade Studios with producer Mark Lewis, which was released June 19 via Metal Blade Records, debuted at No. 47 on the Billboard 200, selling roughly 9,200 copies in its first week. The first single, entitled "Hate Creation", was released on April 30 via the Metal Blade Records YouTube channel. Whitechapel had to cancel the European tour with August Burns Red and The Devil Wears Prada due to an illness in the family. They co-headlined the Brothers of Brutality tour in January and February with The Plot in You, Obey the Brave, Unearth, and Emmure as well as co-headlining the "Don't Pray for Us" tour with Asking Alexandria, Motionless in White, Chimaira, and I Killed the Prom Queen.

On April 16, 2013, a remixed and remastered edition of their debut album The Somatic Defilement was released via Metal Blade Records.

=== Our Endless War (2013–2015) ===
The band announced via Twitter and Instagram that a new album would be recorded in the Fall of 2013. With this announcement they released a video of a new guitar riff. On August 31, 2013, the band announced via Facebook that drum tracking for the album had begun. On November 29, 2013, vocalist Phil Bozeman stated via YouTube that the band's last day in the studio would be December 9, and said that by then, everything should be done and ready to be sent to mixing and mastering. He said that he did not yet have a release date for the album, but simply said "sometime next year, sometime after Christmas". On December 7, the band posted an in-studio teaser of the new album on both Facebook and YouTube. On December 10, the band announced that tracking of the album had been completed. On February 26, 2014, it was announced the new album would be called Our Endless War, and the album's lead single, "The Saw is the Law", was released. They also announced a North American release date of April 29, 2014, and released the album artwork and track listing on the same day. Our Endless War itself received generally positive reviews upon its release. On February 20, 2015, the band published a video for the song "Let Me Burn" from the album. A lyric and live music video were released for the title track, "Our Endless War", and a music video was released for "Worship the Digital Age". They released a live album titled The Brotherhood of the Blade on October 30, 2015.

=== Mark of the Blade (2015–2017) ===
On September 13, 2015, Phil Bozeman informally announced in YouTube vlog that the band was currently in the process of writing a new album entitled Mark of the Blade. The album was released on June 24, 2016.

On August 9, 2017, Ben Harclerode announced via Twitter that he had parted ways with the group, stating "...it was the hardest move I've ever made, but I was truly unhappy and needed to happen."

=== The Valley (2018–2020) ===
On November 2, 2018, the band announced their seventh studio album The Valley will be released on March 29, 2019, via Metal Blade Records and the first song "Brimstone" was released. It has also been reported Navene Koperweis from Entheos has tracked drums for the upcoming album. The song solidifies a change in their once-deathcore sound to a more melodic metal sound.

On February 20, 2019, the band released a music video for the song "When a Demon Defiles a Witch".

On March 21, 2019, the band released a music video for "Hickory Creek". The song consists almost entirely of clean or melodic vocals in a stark contrast to much of their earlier work. The video ends with a dedication to the lead vocalist's mother, "Theresa Leslie Bozeman" who died in 2000. This echoes the dedication at the end of their 2016 music video for the song "Bring Me Home" which concludes with a dedication to Bozeman's father Michael Gary Bozeman who died in 1995.

On April 14, 2020, an acoustic version of "Hickory Creek" was released. This is the first Whitechapel song to feature entirely clean vocals.

=== Kin (2020–2023) ===
On September 23, 2020, guitarist Alex Wade revealed to Knotfest.com's "Mosh Talks" that recording had begun on the next Whitechapel album. Wade stated the COVID-19 Pandemic had given them time to make a new album and that it would once again be produced by Mark Lewis. He also stated the album will contain clean vocals and melody as well as the trademark heaviness the band is known for.

On August 30, 2021, Whitechapel revealed the album's title as Kin, scheduled for release on October 29, 2021. The band released the first single from Kin, entitled "Lost Boy", on August 31, 2021. They released a second single, "A Bloodsoaked Symphony", on September 23, 2021. The album's third and final single before release, titled "Orphan", premiered on October 14, 2021, just over two weeks before the release of Kin. Contrary to the previous singles, "Orphan" was much slower in pace, resembling a ballad, and features entirely clean vocals. Kin was elected by Loudwire as the 37th best rock/metal album of 2021.

On September 3, 2021, the band announced that Alex Rüdinger would become their permanent drummer. He had previously been the band's live drummer, starting in 2019. However, on December 7, 2021, Rüdinger announced that he had left the band and was never a permanent member, only a touring drummer and studio member, and that the band's announcement had been made prematurely.

=== Hymns in Dissonance (2023–present) ===
On June 8, 2023, the band announced that they were in the studio working on their ninth studio album. The following year, former Enterprise Earth drummer Brandon Zackey joined the band full-time, having previously toured with them since 2022. On September 12, 2024, the band released the single "A Visceral Retch". On January 15, 2025, the band announced that they would release their ninth studio album titled Hymns in Dissonance on March 7, 2025, and showcased the album's title track along with the announcement. The band then performed at the Sonic Temple music festival in Columbus, Ohio in May 2025.

The band are confirmed to be appearing at Welcome to Rockville taking place in Daytona Beach, Florida in May 2026. In the fall, Whitechapel will embark on an anniversary tour in North America celebrating 20 years since the band's formation, with Chelsea Grin, The Acacia Strain and Netherwalker serving as supporting acts.

== Musical style and influences ==
Whitechapel has been classified as deathcore, progressive metal, death metal, and groove metal. Additionally, Loudwire stated that the band has also been classified under several other "all-encompassing" labels such as "myspace-core" and "scene-core," due to the band's popularity with listeners who the publication described as "the scene kids of Myspace." Loudwire designated Whitechapel as being among deathcore's "Big Four", along with Suicide Silence, Job for a Cowboy and Thy Art is Murder.

Whitechapel have stated that they are influenced by a wide variety of artists, including Cannibal Corpse, Slipknot, Slayer, Meshuggah, Deftones, Korn, Dying Fetus, Bloodbath, Pantera, Metallica, Suffocation, Despised Icon, Behemoth, Nile, Gojira, Vader, Necrophagist, Tool, Carcass, Aborted, Amon Amarth, Agnostic Front, Hatebreed, Deicide, Morbid Angel, Napalm Death, Entombed and Cattle Decapitation. Whitechapel's lyrical themes mostly resolve around anti-religion, corruption, and politics, however, their albums, The Valley and Kin both revolve around Bozeman's childhood.

In an interview, Bozeman said, "Me and Ben [Savage] are more the death metal kind of guys like Cannibal Corpse and Bloodbath, Zach [Householder] is too but he's more into epic black metal and European metal, Norwegian black metal and he brings a lot of that influence, Alex [Wade] has more of a hardcore background and that's his influence." Additionally, Bozeman's rapid-fire vocal cadences incorporate influence from hip hop music. Bozeman occasionally cups his microphone with his hands to "thicken the distortion behind his voice," according to Joe Davita of Loudwire.

On Whitechapel's 2016 album Mark of the Blade, the songs "Bring Me Home" and "Decennium" were the first to feature lead vocalist Phil Bozeman performing clean vocals. Bozeman continued to use clean vocals on the songs "When a Demon Defiles a Witch", "Hickory Creek", and "Third Depth", on the 2019 album The Valley, as well as the majority of Kin. On Hymns in Dissonance, the usage of clean vocals was abandoned in favor of returning to the band's heavier roots.

== Band members ==
Whitechapel live at Full Force 2019

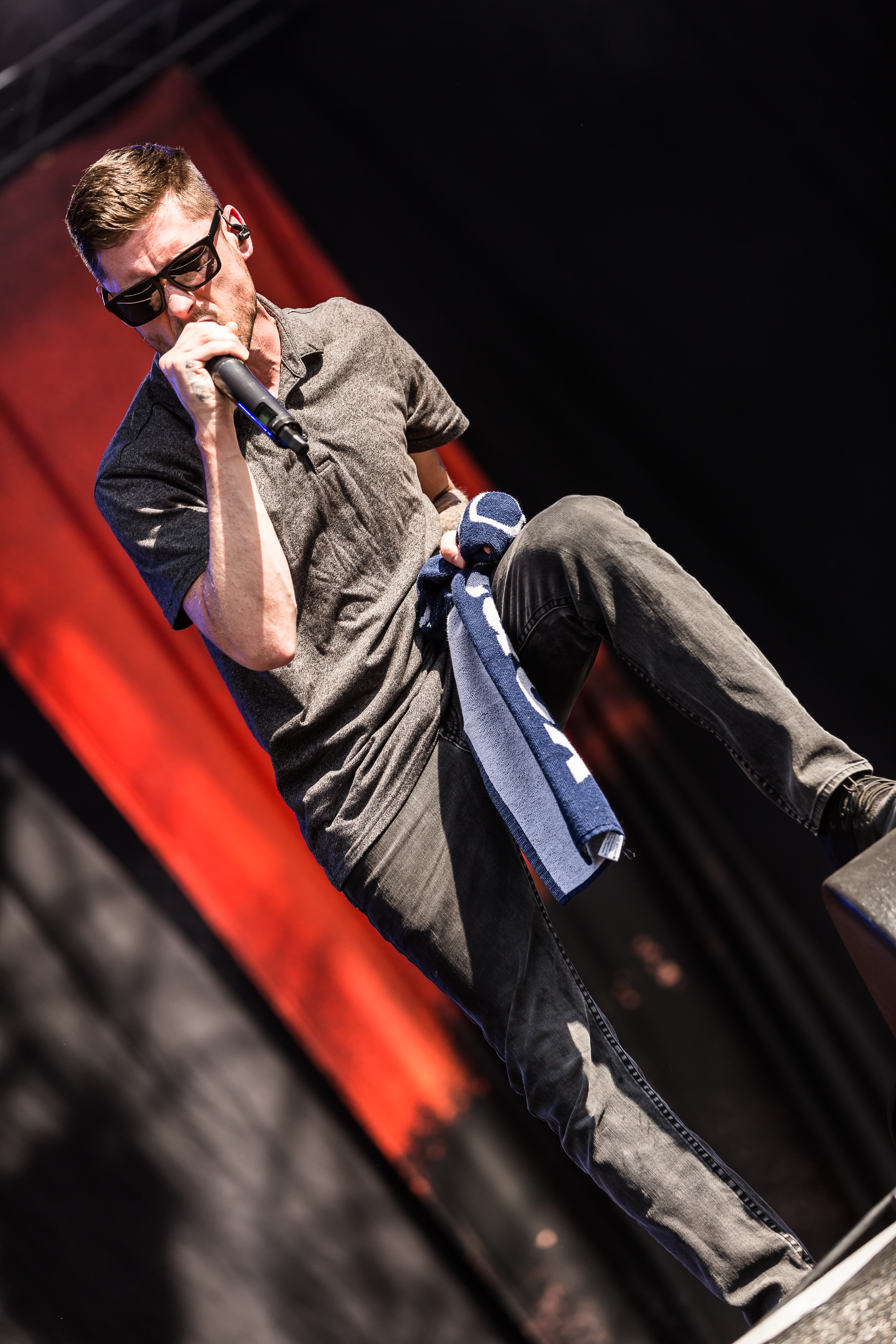
Vocalist Phil Bozeman

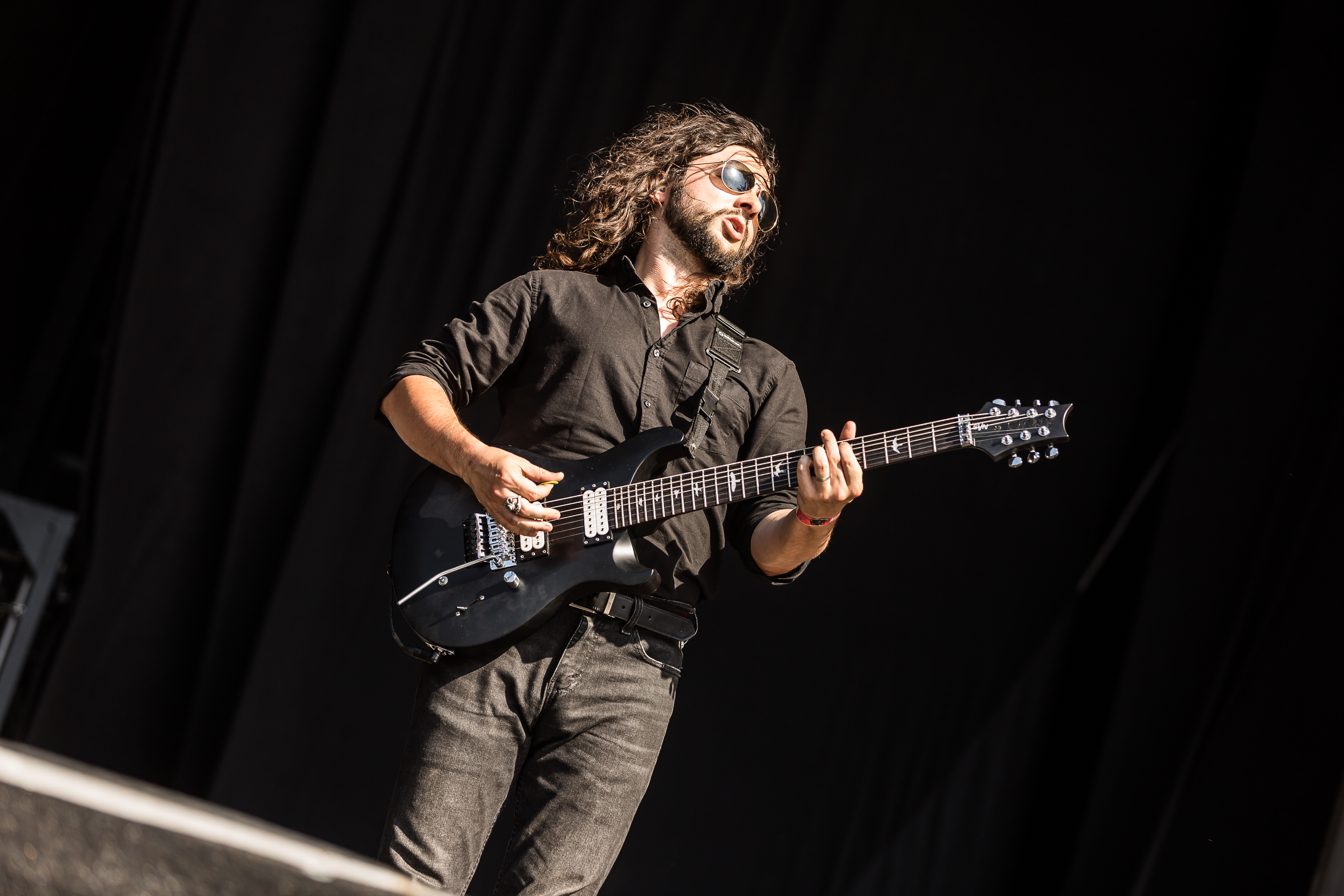
Guitarist Ben Savage

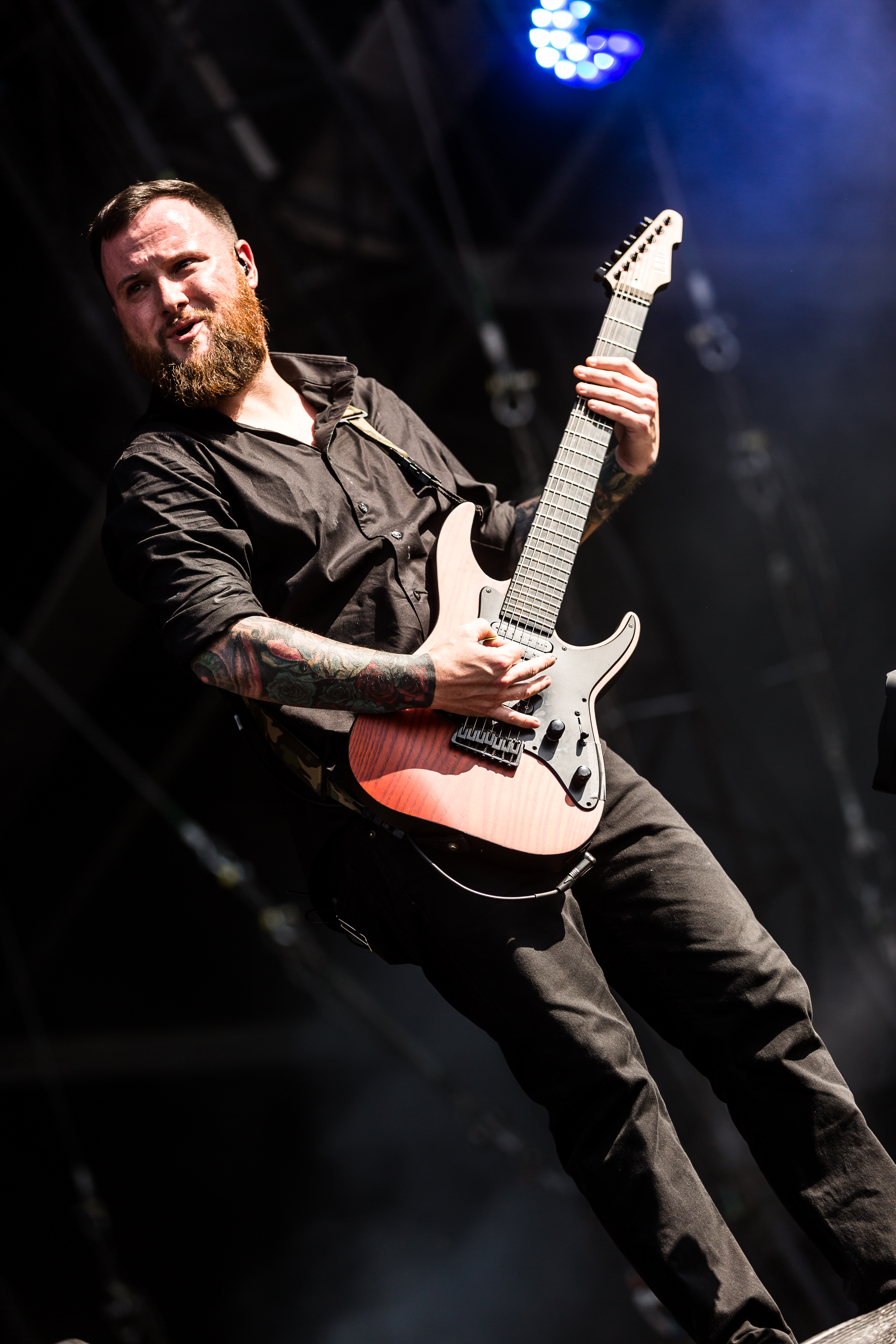
Guitarist Alex Wade

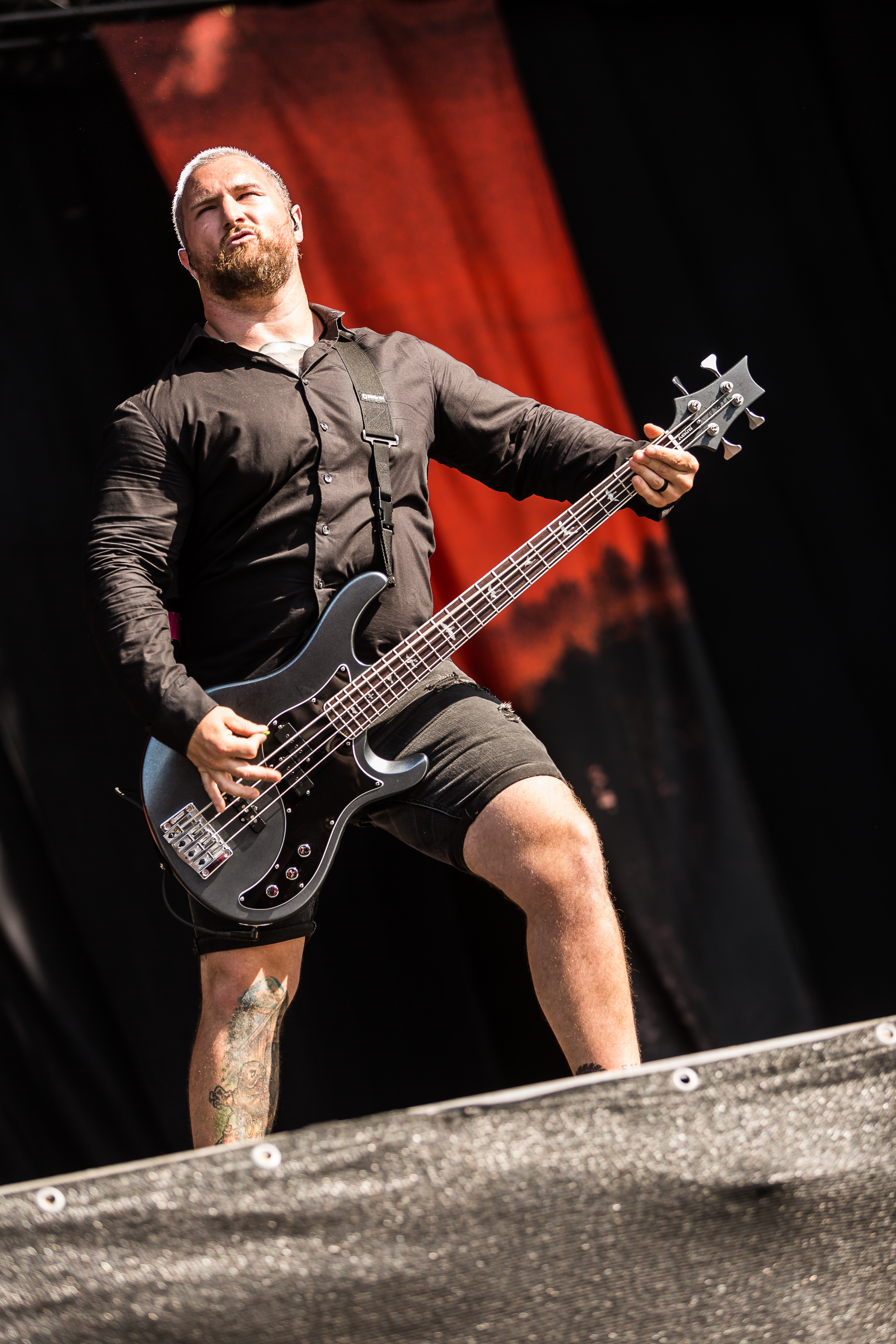
Bassist Gabe Crisp

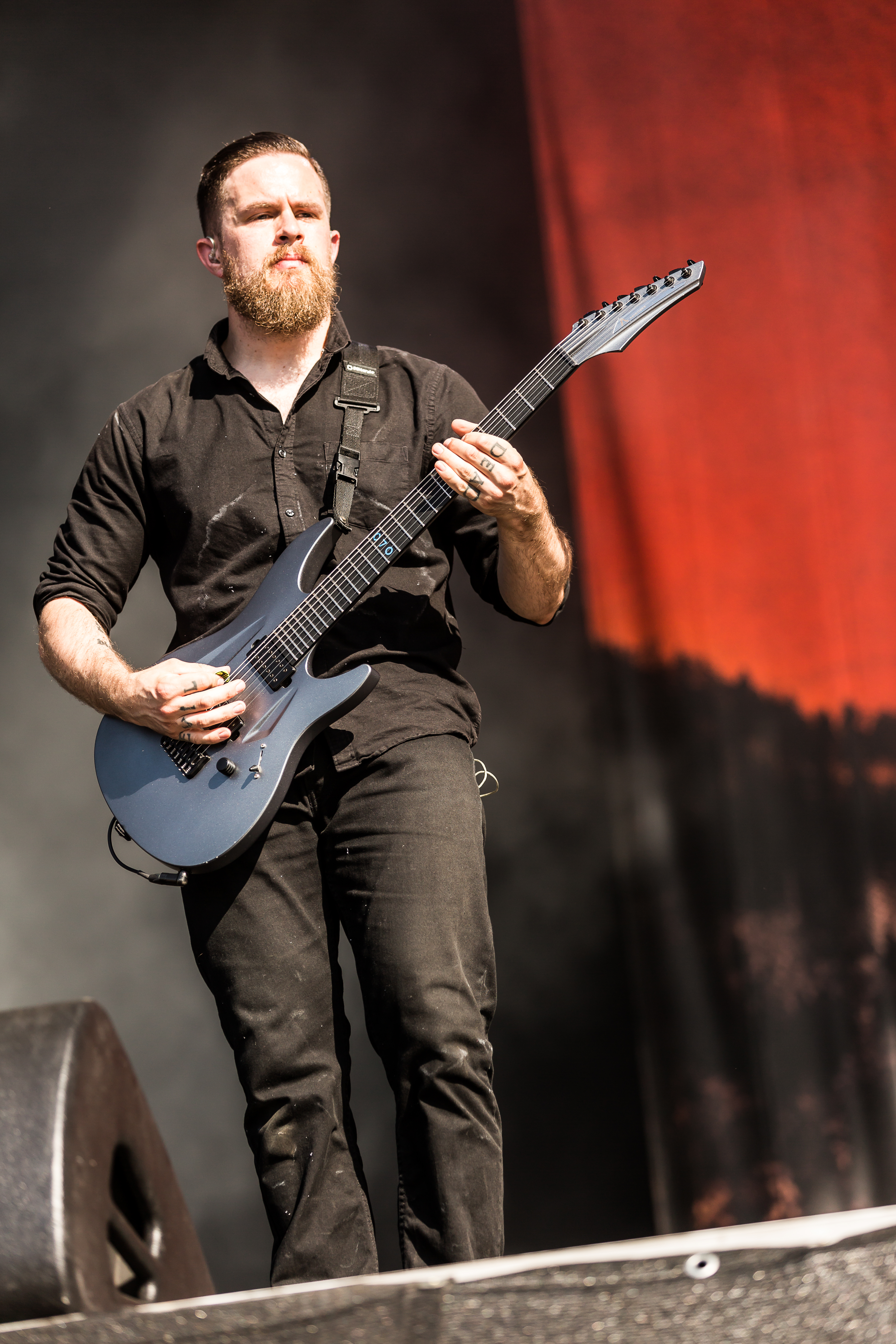
Guitarist Zach Householder

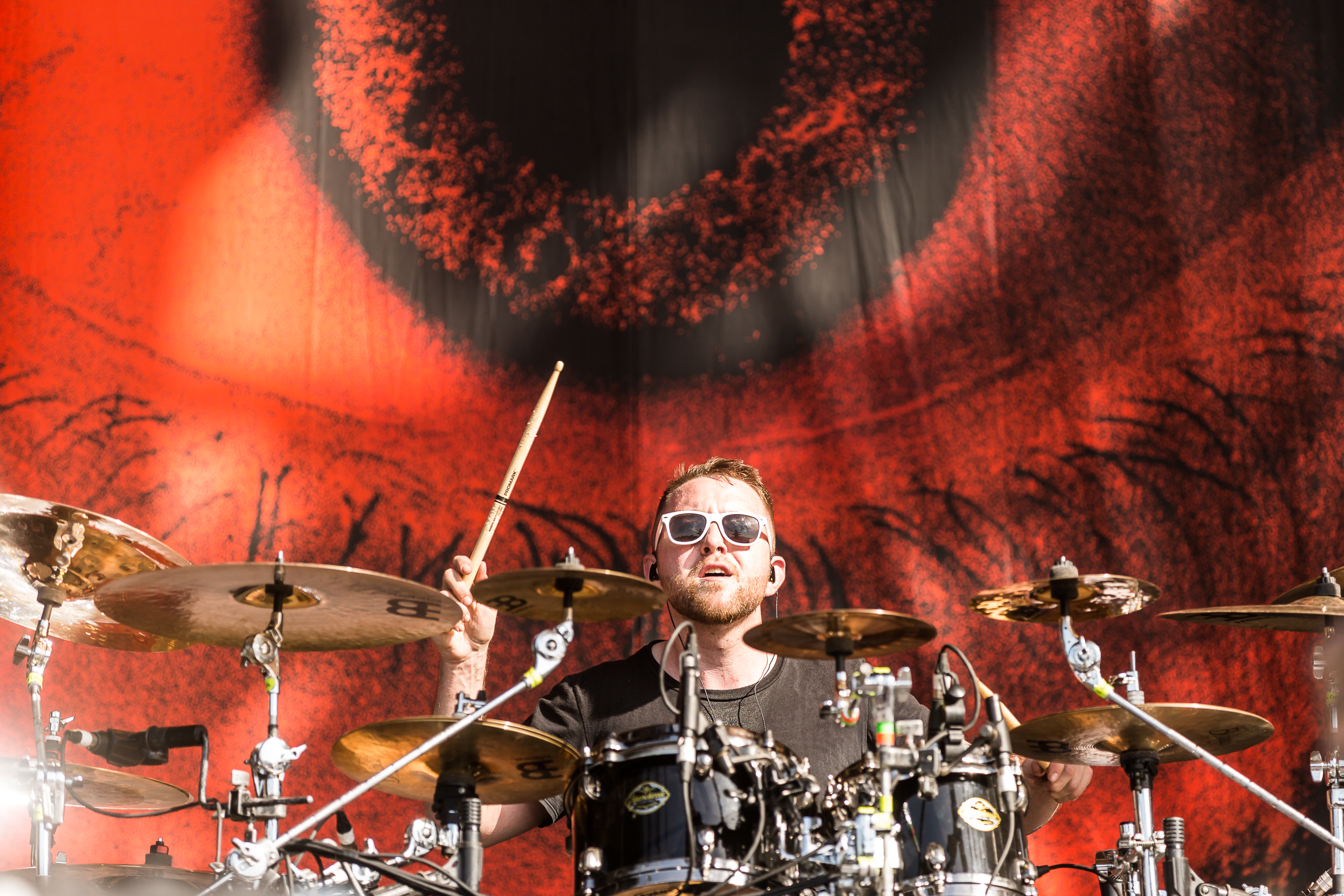
Former touring drummer Alex Rüdinger

Current

- Phil Bozeman – vocals (2006–present)
- Ben Savage – lead guitar (2006–present)
- Alex Wade – guitar (2006–present)
- Gabe Crisp – bass (2006–present)
- Zach Householder – guitar (2007–present)
- Brandon Zackey – drums (2024–present; touring 2022–2024)

Session and touring

- Ben Eller – guitars (2013)
- Gavin Parsons – drums (2011)
- Chason Westmoreland – drums (2017)
- Ernie Iniguez – drums (2017–2019)
- Alex Rüdinger – drums (2019–2021)

Former

- Derek Martin – drums (2006–2007)
- Brandon Cagle – guitar (2006–2007)
- Kevin Lane – drums (2007–2010)
- Ben Harclerode – drums (2011–2017)

Timeline

== Discography ==
=== Studio albums ===
List of studio albums, with selected chart positions
Title	Album details	Peak chart positions									
Title	Album details	US	US Heat.	US Indie.	US Rock	US Hard Rock	AUT	BEL (WA)	CAN	GER	SWI
The Somatic Defilement	Released: July 31, 2007; Label: Candlelight; Formats: CD, digital download	—	—	—	—	—	—	—	—	—	—
This Is Exile	Released: July 8, 2008; Label: Metal Blade; Formats: CD, digital download	118	2	14	—	13	—	—	—	—	—
A New Era of Corruption	Released: June 8, 2010; Label: Metal Blade; Formats: CD, digital download	43	—	3	12	5	—	—	74	—	—
Whitechapel	Released: June 19, 2012; Label: Metal Blade; Formats: CD, digital download	47	—	10	20	3	—	168	65	—	—
Our Endless War	Released: April 29, 2014; Label: Metal Blade; Formats: CD, digital download	10	—	2	2	1	72	—	23	50	—
Mark of the Blade	Released: June 24, 2016; Label: Metal Blade; Formats: CD, digital download	72	—	3	6	1	36	165	—	16	64
The Valley	Released: March 29, 2019; Label: Metal Blade; Formats: LP, CD, digital download	143	—	5	26	7	36	—	—	27	46
Kin	Released: October 29, 2021; Label: Metal Blade; Formats: LP, CD, digital download	—	—	—	—	—	59	—	—	36	63
Hymns in Dissonance	Released: March 7, 2025; Label: Metal Blade; Formats: LP, CD, digital download	—	—	—	—	—	17	—	—	28	59
"—" denotes a recording that did not chart or was not released in that territory.

=== Extended plays ===
- Recorrupted (2011)

=== Demos ===
- Demo 1 (2006)
- Demo 2 (2006)

=== Live albums ===
- The Brotherhood of the Blade (2015)
- Live in the Valley (2024)

=== Music videos ===
Year	Title	Director	Album
2008	"This Is Exile"	David Brodsky	This Is Exile
2008	"Possession"	David Brodsky	This Is Exile
2009	"Eternal Refuge"	Abstrakt Pictures	This Is Exile
2010	"The Darkest Day of Man"	David Brodsky	A New Era of Corruption
2011	"Breeding Violence"	Scott Hansen	A New Era of Corruption
2012	"I, Dementia"	David Brodsky	Whitechapel
2012	"Possibilities of an Impossible Existence"	Strati Hovartos	Whitechapel
2014	"Our Endless War"	Naughty Mantis	Our Endless War
2014	"Worship the Digital Age"	David Brodsky	Our Endless War
2015	"Let Me Burn"	Mitch Massie	Our Endless War
2016	"Elitist Ones"	James Foster	Mark of the Blade
2016	"Bring Me Home"	Naughty Mantis	Mark of the Blade
2019	"When a Demon Defiles a Witch"	Mathis Arnell	The Valley
2019	"Hickory Creek"	Mathis Arnell	The Valley
2020	"Doom Woods"	Chrystal Spotlight	The Valley
2021	"Lost Boy"	Chrystal Spotlight	Kin
2021	"A Bloodsoaked Symphony"	David Brodsky	Kin
2021	"Orphan"	David Brodsky	Kin
2022	"Anticure"	David Brodsky	Kin
2023	"I Will Find You"	David Brodsky	Kin
2023	"Without You - Without Us"	David Brodsky	Kin
2024	"A Visceral Retch"	David Brodsky	Hymns in Dissonance
2025	"Hymns in Dissonance"	David Brodsky	Hymns in Dissonance
2025	"Hate Cult Ritual"	David Brodsky	Hymns in Dissonance
2026	"Nothing is Coming for Any of Us"	David Brodsky	Hymns in Dissonance
