= Whitechapel (album) =

Studio album by Whitechapel
- Released: June 19, 2012
- Recorded: January–February 2012
- Genre: Deathcore
- Length: 38:10
- Label: Metal Blade
- Producer: Whitechapel, Mark Lewis

Whitechapel chronology
Recorrupted (2011)	Whitechapel (2012)	Our Endless War (2014)

Professional ratings
Aggregate scores
Source	Rating
Metacritic	77/100
Review scores
Source	Rating
About.com	4/5 stars
AllMusic	3.5/5 stars
The A.V. Club	B−
Exclaim!	positive
Metal Forces	5/10
Metal Storm	8.5/10
Rock Sound	9/10

Whitechapel is the fourth studio album by American deathcore band Whitechapel. It was released worldwide on June 19, 2012, through Metal Blade Records. This is the first album to feature drummer Ben Harclerode. The album cover features the band's logo, a sawblade with three stars inside it (an homage to the flag of the band's homestate, Tennessee).

== History and background ==
On April 30, Whitechapel announced that their fourth album will be self-titled and was released on June 19, 2012. They released a new song, "Hate Creation", the same day. On May 29, the song "I, Dementia" was released.

== Track listing ==
No.	Title	Length
1.	"Make It Bleed"	4:12
2.	"Hate Creation"	3:29
3.	"(Cult)uralist"	3:42
4.	"I, Dementia"	4:43
5.	"Section 8"	4:26
6.	"Faces"	3:12
7.	"Dead Silence"	4:38
8.	"The Night Remains"	2:58
9.	"Devoid" (instrumental)	2:50
10.	"Possibilities of an Impossible Existence"	4:00
Total length:		38:10

== Credits ==
Production and performance credits are adapted from the album liner notes.

=== Personnel ===
Whitechapel

- Phil Bozeman – vocals
- Ben Savage – lead guitar
- Alex Wade – guitar
- Zach Householder – guitar
- Gabe Crisp – bass
- Ben Harclerode – drums

Additional musicians

- Ben Eller – guitar solo on "I, Dementia", "Faces"

Production

- Mark Lewis – engineering, mixing, production
- Whitechapel – production
- Eyal Levi – drum assistant, additional engineering, mix engineering
- Jarret Prichard – drum tech
- Nate Carpenter – drum tech
- John Douglass – additional engineering
- Alan Douches – mastering

Artwork and design

- Aaron Marsh – artwork
- Whitechapel – art direction
- Adam Zlmakias – photography

=== Studios ===
- Audiohammer, Sanford, FL, US – recording (drums), mixing
- Wade Studios, Louisville, TN, US – recording (guitars, bass, vocals)
- West West Side Music – mastering

== Charts ==
Chart performance
Chart (2012)	Peak position
Belgian Albums (Ultratop Wallonia)	168
Canadian Albums (Nielsen SoundScan)	65
UK Independent Albums (OCC)	41
UK Rock & Metal Albums (OCC)	17
US Billboard 200	47
US Independent Albums (Billboard)	10
US Top Hard Rock Albums (Billboard)	3
US Top Rock Albums (Billboard)	20
US Top Tastemaker Albums (Billboard)	20
