= Abysmal =

2015 studio album by the Black Dahlia Murder

Studio album by the Black Dahlia Murder
- Released: September 18, 2015
- Studio: Rustbelt Studios in Royal Oak, Michigan (drums); Regal Fecal Studios in Warren, Michigan (guitars and bass); Castle Strnad in Auburn Hills, Michigan (lead guitar and vocals); Studio 53 in London, England (violin and cello)
- Genre: Melodic death metal
- Length: 37:07
- Label: Metal Blade
- Producer: The Black Dahlia Murder

The Black Dahlia Murder chronology
Everblack (2013)	Abysmal (2015)	Nightbringers (2017)

Singles from Abysmal
- 1. "Vlad, Son of the Dragon" Released: June 24, 2015; 2. "Receipt" Released: July 22, 2015; 3. "Threat Level No. 3" Released: August 19, 2015

Professional ratings
Review scores
Source	Rating
About.com	4/5 stars
AllMusic	4/5 stars
Sputnikmusic	4/5 stars

Abysmal is the seventh studio album by American melodic death metal band the Black Dahlia Murder. It was released on September 18, 2015 through Metal Blade Records. It was produced by Mark Lewis, who also produced The Black Dahlia Murder's albums Deflorate and Ritual, and the band's former bassist Ryan Williams, who also produced their preceding album Everblack. It was the band's last album to feature guitarist Ryan Knight before his departure in February 2016, until his return in 2022 and performance on Servitude in 2024.

== Track listing ==
All lyrics are written by Trevor Strnad, except "Der Ton" written by Brian Eschbach; all music is composed by the Black Dahlia Murder.

Standard Edition
No.	Title	Length
1.	"Receipt"	4:02
2.	"Vlad, Son of the Dragon"	2:56
3.	"Abysmal"	3:41
4.	"Re-Faced"	3:50
5.	"Threat Level No. 3"	3:46
6.	"The Fog"	3:50
7.	"Stygiophobic"	3:14
8.	"Asylum"	3:38
9.	"The Advent"	3:41
10.	"That Cannot Die Which Eternally Is Dead"	4:29
Total length:		37:07

Deluxe Edition Bonus Tracks
No.	Title	Length
11.	"We Dead Are Best Left Underground"	3:00
12.	"Hellion"	1:05
13.	"Der Ton"	1:20
Total length:		42:32

== Personnel ==
The Black Dahlia Murder

- Trevor Strnad – lead vocals
- Brian Eschbach – guitar
- Ryan Knight – guitar
- Max Lavelle – bass
- Alan Cassidy – drums

Additional personnel

- Mitch McGugan - violin
- Rhianon Lock and Rachel Dawson - cello
- Bertie Anderson - classical vocals on "Vlad, Son of the Dragon"
- Ryan McCullough - MIDI voicings

Production

- The Black Dahlia Murder – production
- Mark Lewis – recording, engineering, mixing, mastering
- Ryan "Bart" Williams – recording, engineering
- Daemorph – artwork

== Charts ==
Chart (2015)	Peak position
Belgian Albums (Ultratop Flanders)	126
Belgian Albums (Ultratop Wallonia)	113
German Albums (Offizielle Top 100)	66
US Billboard 200	45
US Top Hard Rock Albums (Billboard)	8
US Top Rock Albums (Billboard)	15
