= Pursuit of Honor =

Pursuit of Honor may refer to:

- Pursuit of Honor (novel), a 2009 novel by Vince Flynn
- Pursuit of Honor (album), a 2011 album by Battlecross

== See also ==
- In Pursuit of Honor, a 1995 American Western film
