= Disentomb =

Australian death metal band

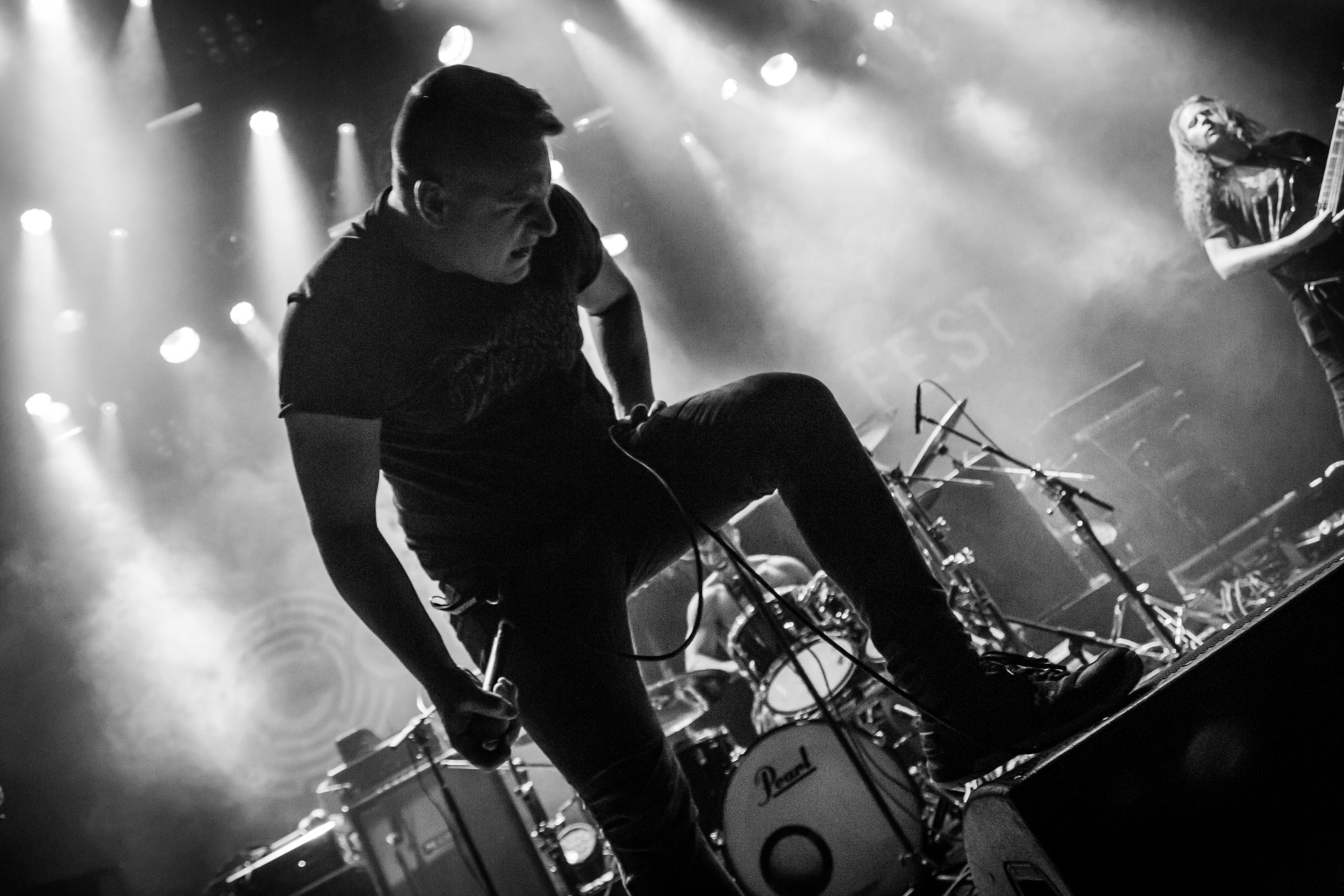
- Performing at 2018's Complexity Fest held in Haarlem, Netherlands

Background information
- Origin: Brisbane, Queensland, Australia
- Genre: Death metal
- Years active: 2009–present
- Labels: Unique Leader Records, New Standard Elite, Amputated Vein, Obsidian
- Spinoff of: Cadaverine
- Members: Jordan James Phillip; Jake Wilkes; Adrian Cappelletti; Henri Sison
- Past members: Thomas Joice; Jim Parker

Disentomb are an Australian death metal band from Brisbane. They were founded soon after the disestablishment of Brisbane death metal act Cadaverine by three of its five members. Jordan Phillip, Henri Sison and Jake Wilkes formed Disentomb, together with original bassist Tom Joice.

The band have released three full-length albums: Sunken Chambers of Nephilim (2010), Misery (2014), and The Decaying Light (2019).

== History ==
The band formed in 2009 and released their first album, Sunken Chambers of Nephilim, on 10 November 2010 via Obsidian Records. They supported it by a national tour in that month. Colin McNamara of The Metal Forge rated it as two out of ten and felt, "The musical formula on every single track is the same. The guitars just chug along with the bass at breakneck speeds, the drums constantly sound like the clack of a roller coaster going up that first hill before plummeting, and the vocals... well... can one say they are even present? The noise is so heinous that it makes them hard to spot and when they do appear it seems like the vocalist is just vomiting out his own innards with indiscernible words. It's impressive for thirty seconds and then downright annoying after that." The album was also issued on the Japanese market via Amputated Vein Records.

Joice left the band in 2012 and was replaced with Jim Parker in 2013. Their second full-length studio record, Misery, was released on 13 October 2014 on New Standard Elite. Aaron Lynn of Death Metal Underground opined that it the group "Creates dark and dissonant brutal death metal yet still stays true to the frenetic riff-salad recipe that is inherent to the brutal death metal artistic voice. On Misery, the internal dialogue of these riffs projects the type of landscape we might find in a dystopic wasteland, tearing songwriting down to its bare, primal foundations in a method evocative of early Suffocation."

Disentomb along with Fallujah, supported The Black Dahlia Murder on their Unhallowed Tour in the spring of 2016, in which The Black Dahlia Murder performed their debut album Unhallowed in its entirety. Jim Parker left in 2017 and was replaced with bassist Adrian Cappelletti. Disentomb toured on the 2018 Devastation of the Nation tour along with Aborted, Psycroptic, Ingested, and Arkaik. The band's third full-length studio album, The Decaying Light, was released on 12 July 2019 through Unique Leader Records.

== Members ==
Current

- Jordan James Phillip – vocals (2009–present)
- Henri Sison – drums (2009–present)
- Jake Wilkes – guitar (2009–present)
- Adrian Cappelletti – bass guitar (2017–present)

Former

- Thomas Joice – bass guitar (2009–2012)
- Jim Parker – bass guitar (2013–2017)

== Discography ==
Studio albums

- Sunken Chambers of Nephilim (2010)
- Misery (2014)
- The Decaying Light (2019)

Extended plays

- Nothing Above (2024)
