= War of Will =

War of Will may refer to:

- War of Will (album), a 2013 album by Battlecross
- War of Will (horse), an American Thoroughbred racehorse
