= Miasma (album) =

2005 album by The Black Dahlia Murder

Studio album by The Black Dahlia Murder
- Released: July 12, 2005
- Recorded: March 2005
- Studio: Planet Red Studios in Richmond, Virginia
- Genre: Melodic death metal
- Length: 33:26
- Label: Metal Blade
- Producer: Andreas Magnuson; Chris Dowhan; The Black Dahlia Murder

The Black Dahlia Murder chronology
Unhallowed (2003)	Miasma (2005)	Nocturnal (2007)

Professional ratings
Review scores
Source	Rating
AllMusic	3/5 stars
Alternative Press	5/5 stars
Blabbermouth	8/10
HCS.net	4/5 stars
Pitchfork	7/10

Miasma is the second studio album by American melodic death metal band The Black Dahlia Murder. Released through Metal Blade Records on July 12, 2005, Miasma is the only album to feature drummer Zach Gibson, who replaced founding member and drummer Cory Grady, as well as being the last with bassist David Lock. Gibson also left the band the following year after the release of the album and was replaced by Shannon Lucas, formerly of All That Remains.

The album's title, Miasma, refers to Miasma theory. The track "Dave Goes to Hollywood" was originally entitled "Vice Campaign". Music videos were released for the tracks "Statutory Ape", "A Vulgar Picture", and "Miasma".

== Track listing ==
All lyrics are written by Trevor Strnad; all music is composed by The Black Dahlia Murder.

No.	Title	Length
1.	"Built for Sin"	1:15
2.	"I'm Charming"	2:54
3.	"Flies"	3:26
4.	"Statutory Ape"	3:42
5.	"A Vulgar Picture"	3:37
6.	"Novelty Crosses"	3:51
7.	"Dave Goes to Hollywood"	3:59
8.	"Miscarriage"	3:09
9.	"Spite Suicide"	2:52
10.	"Miasma"	4:41
Total length:		33:26

== Personnel ==
The Black Dahlia Murder

- Trevor Strnad – lead vocals, design concept
- John Kempainen – guitar
- Brian Eschbach – guitar, backing vocals
- David Lock – bass
- Zach Gibson – drums

Additional musicians

- Garrett Gross, Randy Vanderbilt and The Black Dahlia Murder – backing vocals
- Amber Blankenship – cello

Production

- Produced by Andreas Magnuson, Chris Dowhan and The Black Dahlia Murder
- Randy Vanderbilt – assistant producer
- Brian Slagel – executive producer
- Chris Dowhan – recording assistant
- Eric Rachel – mixing
- Alan Douches – mastering
- Jamey Erickson – design, photography

== Chart positions ==
Chart (2005)	Peak position
US Billboard 200	118
US Independent Albums (Billboard)	5
US Heatseekers Albums (Billboard)	1
