= Battlecross =

American heavy metal band

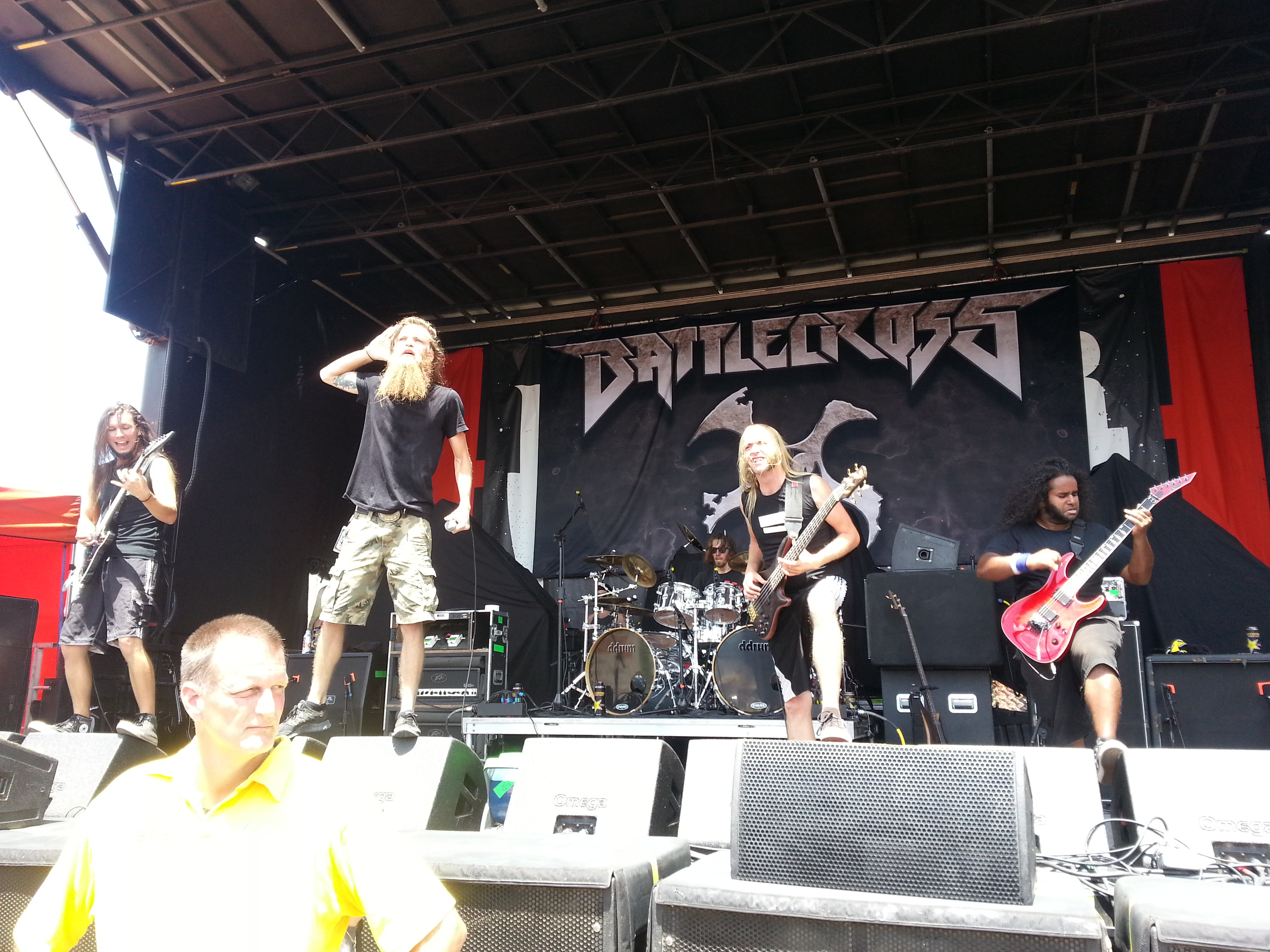
- Battlecross in 2013

Background information
- Origin: Canton, Michigan, U.S.
- Genres: Thrash metal, melodic death metal
- Years active: 2003–2022 (indefinite hiatus)
- Label: Metal Blade
- Members: Tony Asta; Hiran Deraniyagala; Don Slater; Kyle Gunther; Brian Zink
- Past members: Alex Bent; Jay Saling; Jason Leone; Marshall Wood; Mike Kreger
- Website: Battlecrossmetal.com

Battlecross was an American extreme metal band formed in Canton, Michigan in 2003. The band has described their sound as "Blue Collar Thrash Metal". They released four albums through Metal Blade Records and toured extensively before announcing a hiatus in 2022.

== History ==
The band was founded in 2003 by childhood best friends and neighbors Tony Asta and Hiran Deraniyagala in Canton, MI while attending Salem High School. In 2006, vocalist Marshall Wood was hired, and in 2007, drummer Mike Kreger was hired. In 2008, bassist Don Slater joined the band. Together, they played local shows around Detroit and in the Midwest and opened for such acts as Dying Fetus, Gwar, DevilDriver, The Absence, Vital Remains, and The Faceless.

=== Pursuit of Honor (2011) ===
In 2010, Battlecross self-released their debut album Push Pull Destroy. In late 2010, the band caught the eye of Metal Blade Records while members were replacing vocalist Marshall Wood, who left for family reasons. The band tapped Kyle "Gumby" Gunther of the Flint, MI-area band and management roster mate, I Decay, to front the band. Gunther stepped in to re-record the album and rewrote the track Aiden, renaming it Kaleb after his newborn son. The re-recorded album, Pursuit of Honor, was released in August 2011 by Metal Blade Records and was recorded at Random Awesome Recording Studio in Bay City, Michigan and produced by Josh Schroeder.

Pursuit of Honor produced three singles: "Push Pull Destroy", "Man of Stone" and "Breaking You", which combined spent 50 weeks on SiriusXM Liquid Metal 'Devil's Dozen' list of most requested songs, with 'Push Pull Destroy' at the #1 spot for five weeks in Spring 2012. The accompanying video received more than 1.8 million views on YouTube and was the break-out track for the band.

Valkyrian Music described it as "perhaps one of the best albums on the modern thrash metal scene" and claimed they could easily replace the Big Four of thrash metal if they kept making albums like Pursuit of Honor. The debut also drew comparisons to groove metal bands such as Pantera and Lamb of God, with Metal Assault naming the record "one of the most 'complete' heavy metal albums in recent times" and "bristling with fist-pumping, face-melting heavy metal at its finest." Blabbermouth reviewed the album as "easily one of the better metal debuts of 2011", stating that "Pursuit of Honor will leave you breathless, maybe even skinless" and giving the album an '8' rating. The website described the album as "traditional thrash metal, but not in a retro wannabe sense, and is delivered in a package that is modern, yet avoids being too cookie-cutter; melodic, yet not 'pretty' or cleanly sung. Death metal heaviness with compositional skill, 'Pursuit of Honor' is above all else inanely energized."

=== War of Will (2013) ===
In early 2013, the band announced that they would enter the studio in March to record their follow-up to Pursuit of Honor. The band would begin tracking immediately after the "Another Year, Another Tour" with In Flames, Demon Hunter and All Shall Perish for 27 North American dates. Eyal Levi was to handle engineering duties on the record and Armored Saint's Joey Vera, who mastered the band's cover version of Pantera's "Fucking Hostile", would master.

Lewis, responsible for the production and/or engineering for bands such as The Black Dahlia Murder, Trivium, DevilDriver and Deicide, said: "I can't wait to be a part of BATTLECROSS' next record. From the moment I heard the band I knew I wanted to be a part of their development. Hearing the new music has only solidified that feeling. Working with our good friends at Metal Blade and bringing great new music to the masses is what it's all about."

According to statements made in the press, Metal Blade Records President Michael Faley stated that the record would be released in time for the band's appearance on the Rockstar Energy Drink Mayhem Festival in July 2013.

In April 2013, the band's label issued a press release announcing that drummer Shannon Lucas, formerly of All That Remains and The Black Dahlia Murder, served as the session drummer on the newest Battlecross album, to be released in summer of 2013.

The new album's first single "Force Fed Lies" was released and made available for digital download on May 29, 2013.

=== Drummer changes (2014) ===
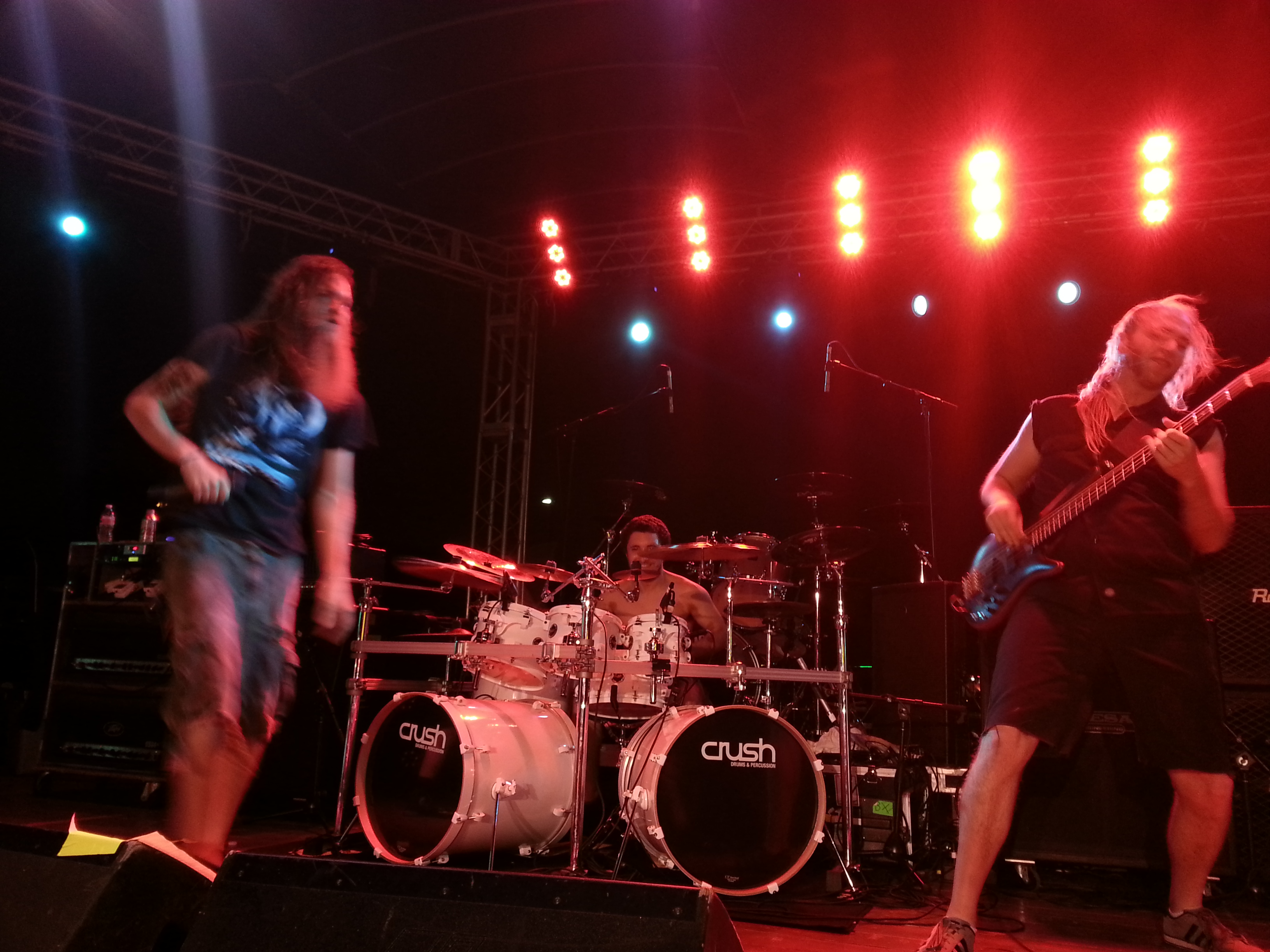
Percussionist Alex Bent

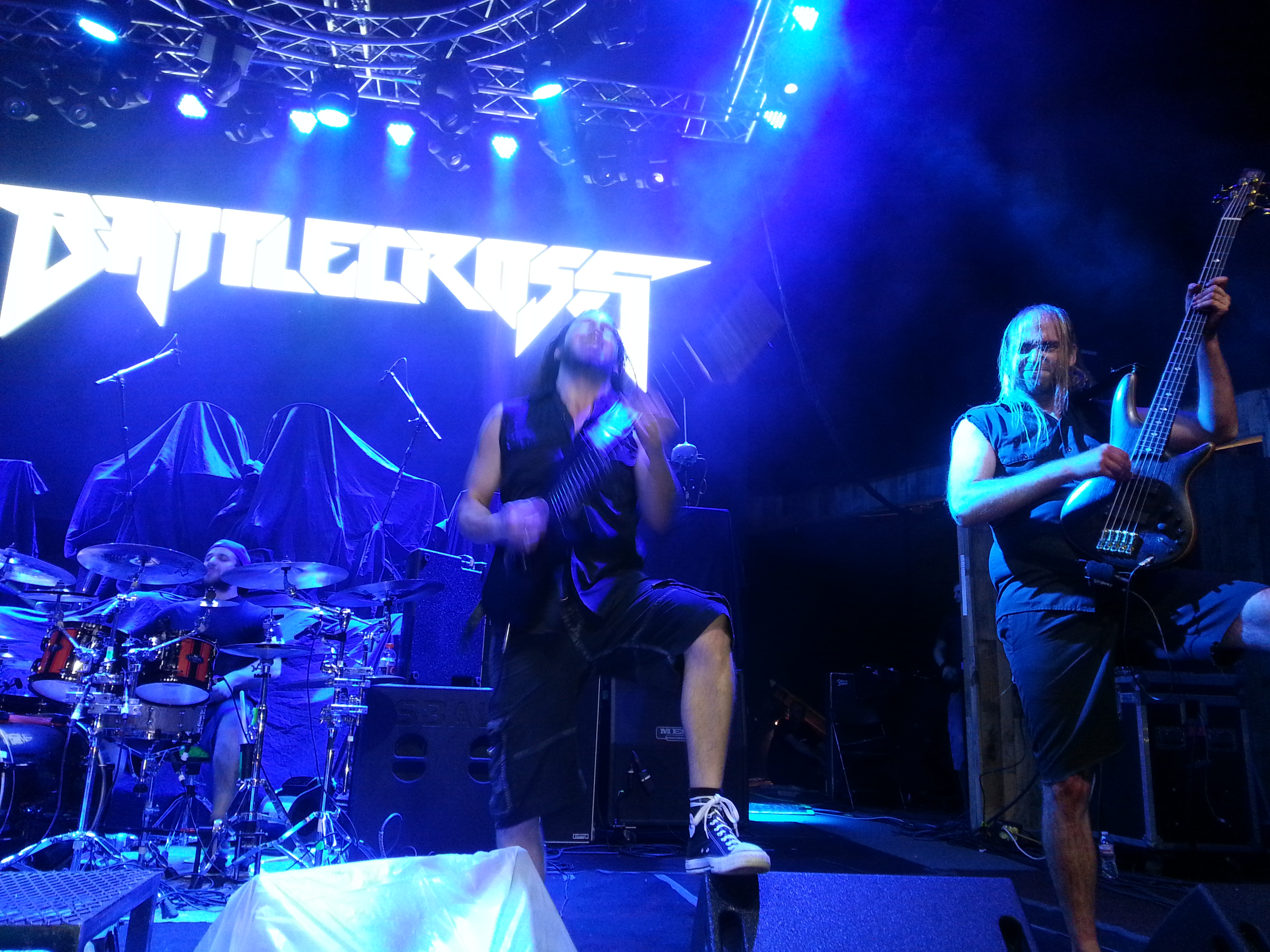
Percussionist Brian Zink

In 2013, it was reported that drummer Michael Kreger had left the band to attend to personal business. Kevin Talley of Six Feet Under was announced as the touring drummer for the band for their New England Metal and Hardcore Festival and Orion Music + More appearances.

Talley, who has also played with Dååth, Chimaira, Misery Index, Nothnegal and Dying Fetus, said: "I'm stoked to play these shows with such an energetic and impressive band like BATTLECROSS. I had a chance to see them play on Trespass America and at the Scion A/V Metal Blade anniversary show and was blown away! New England Metal and Hardcore Festival and Orion Music + More are huge opportunities for the band and I'm honored to fill in behind the kit; they are definitely one of my favorite new bands!"

Following the departure of Michael Kreger, the band went through a cycle of touring drummers. Kevin Talley, formerly of Chimaira, filled in for the 2013 Rockstar Energy Drink Mayhem Festival. Following the tour and a show at GWARBQ 2014, Talley stepped down. When the band joined Hatebreed, Shadows Fall, and The Acacia Strain for a fall 2013 tour, Adam Pierce of All Shall Perish stepped in as drummer for the band.

In 2014, Adam stepped down as the band's drummer, replaced by Shannon Lucas, session drummer from "War of Will". Lucas, already familiar with the material, stuck with the band up until summer 2014.

During 2014, Battlecross saw a rise in popularity, hitting many tours along the way, including a slot on the Download Festival held in Donington Park. While in Europe, the band hit many smaller venues with fellow Mayhem Festival tour mates Huntress. Battlecross continued to tour across America in direct support of Protest the Hero. Lucas withdrew from the band after the tour, replaced by Alex Bent. Bent completed Battlecross' first headlining tour with support from Ikillya. Crimson Shadows were also supposed to be on the tour, but encountered problems getting access to the States. The tour also included a stop at Dirt Fest 2014.

On August 20, Battlecross performed in Mexico City, their first concert in the country, in support of Black Label Society. Following the show, they set off on a small South American tour in support of Killswitch Engage and Memphis May Fire. They then returned to the States for a fall tour opening for Machine Head, Children of Bodom, and Epica. The tour also included a stop at Fillmageddon in Silver Spring, MD.

The band also looked to close 2014 by entering the studio to start the recording of their third studio album.

=== Rise to Power, departure of Alex Bent, and indefinite hiatus (2015–2022) ===
On May 27, 2015, the band released a new single entitled "Not Your Slave" and revealed the title of their upcoming studio album as Rise to Power.

Alex Bent left the band in 2015 and was replaced with Brian Zink.

In April 2016, the ensemble toured with Soulfly, Abnormality, Suffocation and Lody Kong.

From October to November 2016, Battlecross went on tour with Soilwork and Unearth and announced a headlining tour with Allegaeon in support.

In January 2019, the ensemble indicated that they were working on new material.

In 2022, the band announced their annual "Battle Christmas" show would take place on December 9. They revealed the show would be their last "for the foreseeable future" and the band would then go on indefinite hiatus.

== Members ==
=== Final lineup ===
- Tony Asta – lead guitar (2003–2022)
- Hiran Deraniyagala – rhythm guitar (2003–2022)
- Don Slater – bass (2008–2022)
- Kyle "Gumby" Gunther – vocals (2010–2022)
- Brian Zink – drums (2015–2022)

=== Former ===
- Jay Saling – vocals, bass (2003–2006)
- Jason Leone – drums (2003–2007)
- Marshall Wood – vocals (2006–2010)
- Mike Kreger – drums (2007–2013)
- Mike Heugel – bass (2007–2008)
- Shannon Lucas – drums (2013–2014)
- Alex Bent – drums (2014–2015)

=== Live ===
- Josean Orta – drums (2012)
- Adam Pierce – drums (2013)
- Kevin Talley – drums (2013)
- Joe Cady – lead guitar (2015)

== Discography ==
=== Studio albums ===
List of studio albums, with selected chart positions
Title	Album details	Peak chart positions	
Title	Album details	Heatseekers Albums	Billboard 200
Push Pull Destroy	Released: August 17, 2010; Label: (Self-released); Formats: CD, digital download	—	—
Pursuit of Honor	Released: August 2, 2011; Label: Metal Blade Records; Formats: CD, digital download	—	—
War of Will	Released: July 9, 2013; Label: Metal Blade Records; Formats: CD, digital download	2	134
Rise to Power	Released: August 21, 2015; Label: Metal Blade Records; Formats: CD, digital download	4	137
"—" denotes a recording that did not chart or was not released in that territory.

=== Demos ===
List of extended plays
Title	EP details
Demo	Released: 2005; Label: (Self-released)

=== Singles ===
List of singles, showing year released and album name
Title	Year	Album
"Hostile"	2012	Released through iTunes only
"Force Fed Lies"	2013	War of Will

=== Videos ===
List of videos, showing year released
Title	Year
"Push Pull Destroy"	2011
"Kaleb"	2011
"Flesh & Bone"	2013
"Never Coming Back"	2013
"My Vaccine"	2014
"Absence"	2015
