= Abnormality (band) =

American death metal band

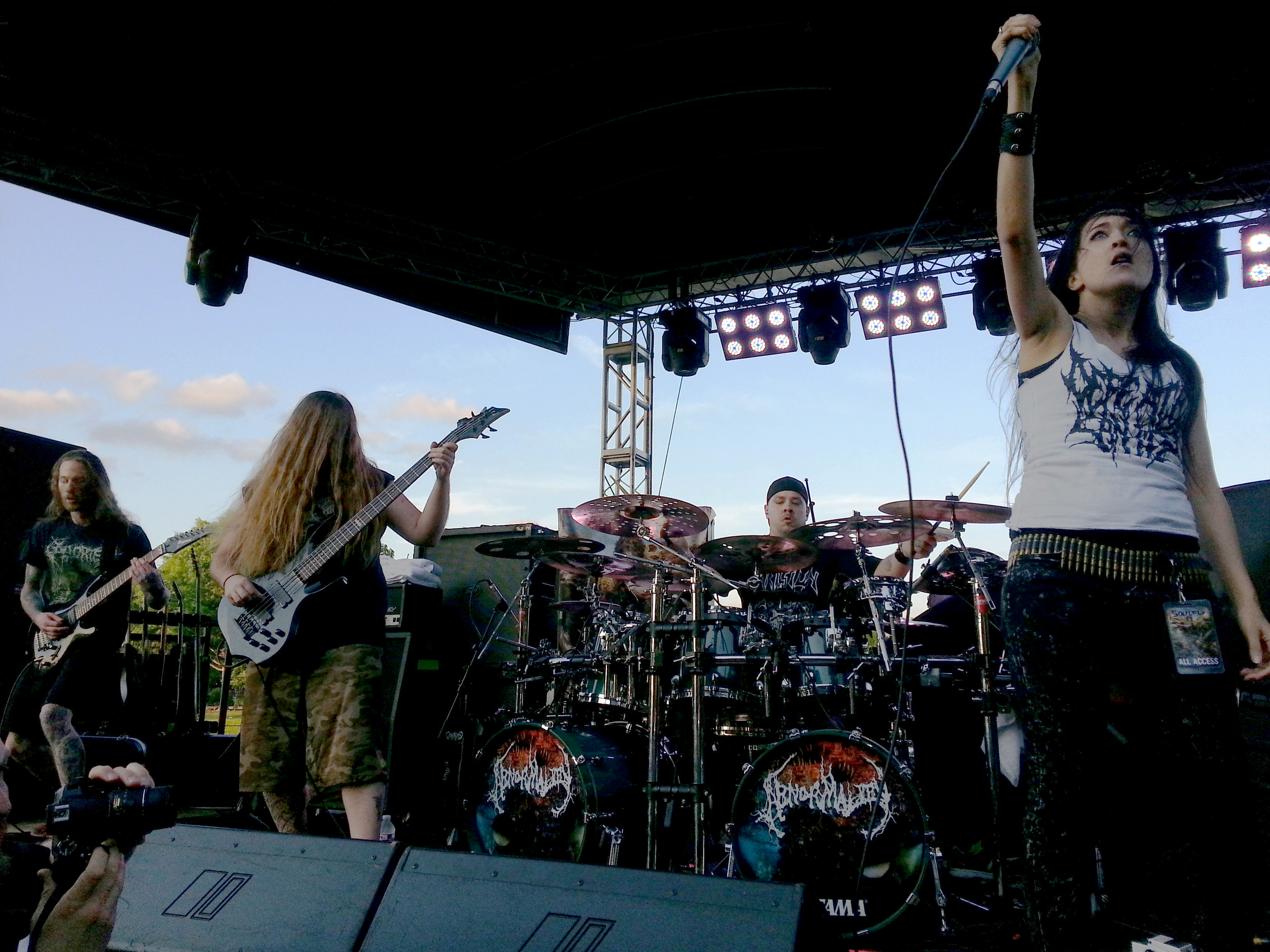
- Abnormality performing in 2016

Background information
- Origin: Boston, Massachusetts, U.S.
- Genre: Death metal
- Years active: 2005–2020
- Labels: Metal Blade, Sevared
- Spinoffs: Emasculator
- Past members: Mallika Sundaramurthy; Jay Blaisdell; Jeremy Henry; Sam Kirsch; Josh Staples; Shawn MacDonald; Michael O'Meara; Ben Durgin
- Website: Official website

Abnormality was an American death metal band from Boston, Massachusetts. Formed in 2005 from various acts such as Sexcrement, Forced Asphyxiation, Goratory, Parasitic Extirpation and Iranach, the band has released three studio albums, Contaminating The Hive Mind, Mechanisms Of Omniscience and Sociopathic Constructs as well as EP The Collective Calm in Mortal Oblivion. In 2015, the quintet signed with Metal Blade Records.

== History ==
In 2005, Abnormality formed from various bands, releasing the debut EP The Collective Calm in Mortal Oblivion five years later.

In June 2012, the band released Contaminating The Hive Mind, their debut studio album. In April of the following year, the group published a music video for "Fabrication Of The Enemy".

In October 2015, the band announced that they were working on their second studio album with producer Pete Rutcho. In 2016, the band announced the title of the work as Mechanisms Of Omniscience, releasing three songs from that album.

In April and May 2016, the band toured with Battlecross, Soulfly, Suffocation and Lody Kong.

In November 2020, the band announced they had broken up.

== Critical reception ==
Brave Words & Bloody Knuckles described the ensemble as "Marrying the ceaseless brutality coming out of New York and New England to the hyper-blasting intensity endemic to Quebecois death metal", going on to state that Mechanisms Of Omniscience is "as unrelenting as it is passionate" and that the album "tackles real world issues with intelligence and raw emotion".

Metalsucks describes the song "Cymatic Hallucinations" as "if Abnormality took all the best elements of modern tech-death, mashed it up with the old school variety, infused it with a sense of groove rarely felt in metal’s more technical corners and created one seething, roaring, fire-breathing death metal beast".

Blabbermouth describes debut album Contaminating The Hive Mind as "cementing their status as one of the heaviest and most dynamic bands in the [extreme metal] genre".

== Members ==
Final

- Mallika Sundaramurthy – vocals (2005–2020)
- Jeremy Henry – rhythm guitar (2005–2020)
- Jay Blaisdell – drums (2005–2020)
- Josh Staples – bass (2009–2020)
- Sam Kirsch – lead guitar (2015–2020)

Former

- Michael O'Meara – lead guitar (2005–2009)
- Shawn MacDonald – bass (2005–2008)
- Ben Durgin – lead guitar (2010–2014)

== Discography ==
Studio albums

- Contaminating the Hive Mind (2012)
- Mechanisms of Omniscience (2016)
- Sociopathic Constructs (2019)

Demos/EPs

- 2007 Demo (2007)
- The Collective Calm in Mortal Oblivion [EP] (2010)
- Curb Stomp (Single) (2019)
- Monarch Alpha (Single) (2019)
