= Unhallowed =

2003 album by the Black Dahlia Murder

Studio album by The Black Dahlia Murder
- Released: June 17, 2003
- Recorded: February 1–15, 2003
- Studio: Cloud City Studios in Detroit, Michigan
- Genre: Melodic death metal
- Length: 36:27
- Label: Metal Blade
- Producer: The Black Dahlia Murder; Mike Hasty

The Black Dahlia Murder chronology
A Cold-Blooded Epitaph (2002)	Unhallowed (2003)	Miasma (2005)

Professional ratings
Review scores
Source	Rating
Allmusic	3/5 stars
Chronicles of Chaos	7/10
Decoy Music	link
HCS.net	link
Lambgoat	8/10

Unhallowed is the debut studio album by American melodic death metal band The Black Dahlia Murder. It was released through Metal Blade Records on June 17, 2003. An enhanced version of the album was released that included photos and info about the band. Metal Blade released a limited edition vinyl version of Unhallowed on August 20, 2013 in honor of the album's tenth anniversary. The band performed the album in its entirety on their spring 2016 tour with Fallujah and Disentomb.

The intro and outro to this record come from the guide Butchering the Human Carcass for Human Consumption by the Church of Euthanasia. The intro is a narration of the section "Gutting" and the outro is from the section titled "Beheading".

The songs "The Blackest Incarnation" and "Closed Casket Requiem" originally appeared on the EP A Cold-Blooded Epitaph and were re-recorded for this album.

A music video was released for the song "Funeral Thirst". The video version of "Funeral Thirst" begins with the intro track "Unhallowed".

== Track listing ==
All lyrics are written by Trevor Strnad; all music is composed by The Black Dahlia Murder.

Standard Edition
No.	Title	Length
1.	"Unhallowed"	1:59
2.	"Funeral Thirst"	3:55
3.	"Elder Misanthropy"	2:34
4.	"Contagion"	3:23
5.	"When the Last Grave Has Emptied"	3:11
6.	"Thy Horror Cosmic"	2:55
7.	"The Blackest Incarnation"	4:43
8.	"Hymn for the Wretched"	4:18
9.	"Closed Casket Requiem"	4:25
10.	"Apex"	5:05
Total length:		36:27

Vinyl Edition Side A
No.	Title	Length
1.	"Unhallowed"	1:59
2.	"Funeral Thirst"	3:55
3.	"Elder Misanthropy"	2:34
4.	"Contagion"	3:23
5.	"When the Last Grave Has Emptied"	3:10

Vinyl Edition Side B
No.	Title	Length
1.	"Thy Horror Cosmic"	2:55
2.	"The Blackest Incarnation"	4:43
3.	"Hymn for the Wretched"	4:28
4.	"Closed Casket Requiem"	4:25
5.	"Apex"	5:01

== Personnel ==
The Black Dahlia Murder

- Trevor Strnad – vocals
- Brian Eschbach – guitar, vocals
- John Kempainen – guitar
- David Lock – bass
- Cory Grady – drums

Additional

- The Black Dahlia Murder – production
- Mike Hasty – production, engineer
- Ryan "Bart" Williams – engineer
- Jason Clifton – mastering
- Brian Ebert – photography
- Adam Wentworth – artwork (graphic design)
- Jon Zig – artwork (logo)
