= Rise to Power (Battlecross album) =

Studio album by Battlecross
- Released: August 21, 2015
- Studio: Audiohammer Studios
- Genre: Melodic death metal, thrash metal
- Length: 35:54
- Label: Metal Blade Records
- Producer: Jason Suecof

Battlecross chronology
War of Will (2013)	Rise to Power (2015)

Rise to Power is the third and final studio album by American extreme metal band Battlecross. It was released through Metal Blade Records on August 21, 2015. It is the only album to feature Alex Bent on drums. The first single from the album, "Not Your Slave", was released on 27 May 2015, followed by "Spoiled" on 29 June 2015. On 19 August 2015, the album was made available for streaming at Metal Hammer.

== Track listing ==
No.	Title	Length
1.	"Scars"	3:01
2.	"Not Your Slave"	3:32
3.	"Absence"	3:22
4.	"Spoiled"	3:05
5.	"The Climb"	3:37
6.	"Blood & Lies"	3:44
7.	"Bound by Fear"	3:42
8.	"Despised"	3:46
9.	"Shackles"	3:54
10.	"The Path"	4:09
Total length:		35:54

== Personnel ==
- Kyle Gunther – vocals
- Tony Asta – lead guitar
- Hiran Deraniyagala – rhythm guitar
- Don Slater – bass
- Alex Bent – drums

== Chart performance ==
Chart (2013)	Peak position
US Heatseekers Albums (Billboard)	4
US Billboard 200 (Billboard)	137
