= Verminous =

2020 studio album by the Black Dahlia Murder

Studio album by the Black Dahlia Murder
- Released: April 17, 2020
- Studio: The Pipeyard Studio in Plymouth, Michigan (drums); Shred Light District in Morristown, New Jersey (guitars, bass and vocals)
- Genre: Melodic death metal
- Length: 35:52
- Label: Metal Blade
- Producer: The Black Dahlia Murder; Brandon Ellis

The Black Dahlia Murder chronology
Nightbringers (2017)	Verminous (2020)	Servitude (2024)

Professional ratings
Aggregate scores
Source	Rating
Metacritic	77/100
Review scores
Source	Rating
Allmusic	4/5 stars
Exclaim!	4/5 stars

Verminous is the ninth studio album by American melodic death metal band the Black Dahlia Murder. It was released on April 17, 2020, through Metal Blade Records. This is the band's final album to feature original member and lead vocalist Trevor Strnad before his death on May 11, 2022.

== Track listing ==
All lyrics are written by Trevor Strnad, except where noted; all music is composed by the Black Dahlia Murder, except where noted.

Standard Edition
No.	Title	Length
1.	"Verminous"	3:50
2.	"Godlessly"	3:28
3.	"Removal of the Oaken Stake"	4:26
4.	"Child of Night"	3:38
5.	"Sunless Empire"	3:58
6.	"The Leather Apron's Scorn"	3:34
7.	"How Very Dead"	3:07
8.	"The Wereworm's Feast"	4:36
9.	"A Womb in Dark Chrysalis"	0:48
10.	"Dawn of Rats"	4:28
Total length:		35:52

Japanese edition bonus track
No.	Title	Length
11.	"Sabre the Dog Theme"	1:18
Total length:		37:10

European Limited edition bonus tracks
No.	Title	Writer(s)	Length
11.	"Their Thwarted Patience"		1:16
12.	"Go to Hell" (Megadeth cover)	Dave Mustaine; David Ellefson; Nick Menza	4:37
Total length:			41:45

== Personnel ==
The Black Dahlia Murder

- Trevor Strnad – lead vocals
- Brian Eschbach – rhythm guitar, backing vocals, lead vocals on "Their Thwarted Patience"
- Brandon Ellis – lead guitar, backing vocals
- Max Lavelle – bass
- Alan Cassidy – drums

Additional musicians

- Michaël Ghelfi – sewer ambience (track 1)

Production and design

- The Black Dahlia Murder – production
- Brandon Ellis – production
- Ryan Williams – recording (drums)
- Brandon Ellis – recording (guitars, bass and vocals)
- Tue Madsen – mixing
- Alan Douches – mastering
- Josh Dillon and Nick Morris – drum assistance
- Juanjo Castellano – cover art
- Shoggoth Kinetics – artwork
- Fetusk - – design
- David E. Jackson – photography
- Brian Slagel – executive producer
