= A Cold-Blooded Epitaph =

2002 EP by the Black Dahlia Murder

EP by the Black Dahlia Murder
- Released: May 2002
- Recorded: January 2002
- Studio: Cloud City Studios in Detroit, Michigan
- Genre: Melodic death metal
- Length: 15:58
- Label: Lovelost
- Producer: Mike Hasty

The Black Dahlia Murder chronology
What a Horrible Night to Have a Curse (2001)	A Cold-Blooded Epitaph (2002)	Unhallowed (2003)

Professional ratings
Review scores
Source	Rating
Lambgoat	7/10

A Cold-Blooded Epitaph is the first EP by American melodic death metal band the Black Dahlia Murder released in May 2002 on Lovelost Records, it is released as an MCD. This is the band's last release with guitarist John Deering.

"The Blackest Incarnation" and "Closed Casket Requiem" were to be later released on their following, full-length album, Unhallowed.

The EP features the cover of "Paint It Black", originally performed by the Rolling Stones in 1966.

== Track listing ==
All tracks are written by the Black Dahlia Murder, except where noted.

No.	Title	Writer(s)	Length
1.	"Closed Casket Requiem"		4:43
2.	"The Blackest Incarnation"		4:41
3.	"Burning the Hive"		4:00
4.	"Paint It Black" (hidden track; The Rolling Stones cover)	Jagger/Richards	2:34
Total length:			15:58

== Personnel ==
The Black Dahlia Murder

- Trevor Strnad – vocals
- John Deering – guitar
- Brian Eschbach – guitar
- Dave Lock – bass
- Cory Grady – drums

Additional

- Mike Hasty – production, mastering
- John Strucel – artwork
