= Shannon Lucas =

American drummer

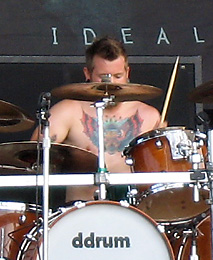
- Lucas performing with All That Remains in 2006

Background information
- Born: September 27, 1983 (age 42); Staunton, Virginia, U.S.
- Genres: Death metal; metalcore; melodic death metal
- Occupation: Drummer
- Years active: 1998–present
- Formerly of: The Black Dahlia Murder; All That Remains

Shannon Lucas (born September 27, 1983) is an American heavy metal drummer from Staunton, Virginia. He is best known as the former drummer for melodic death metal band the Black Dahlia Murder and heavy metal band All That Remains.

== Career ==
Lucas began drumming at the age of 14 while also covering Slayer songs on guitar; he later joined percussion classes in high school. At age 19, he moved to Richmond, Virginia, and joined Cory Smoot in the Gwar side project Mensrea while playing with the deathgrind band Wartorn. While opening for Gwar with the band, Lucas met All That Remains vocalist Phil Labonte and the two remained in close contact. Lucas later moved to Massachusetts and joined All That Remains, replacing drummer Michael Bartlett. Lucas appeared in the All That Remains videos "The Air That I Breathe" and "Tattered on my Sleeve," and performed on tours such as Sounds of the Underground and Ozzfest 2006. Lucas left the band soon after to move to Michigan. He was replaced by Jason Costa.

In March 2007, Lucas auditioned for the melodic death metal band The Black Dahlia Murder on a floor display drum kit at the Guitar Center store in Canton, Michigan, where he worked. He was given the job, replacing Zach Gibson. Since joining the band, Lucas played on their 2007 release Nocturnal, 2009's Deflorate, and 2011's Ritual, and he appeared in the DVD Majesty.

On January 30, 2012, Cannibal Corpse singer George "Corpsegrinder" Fisher confirmed to Metal Injection magazine that he, Lucas, and Adam Dutkiewicz of the band Killswitch Engage were forming a side project, likely to be released on Metal Blade Records. In 2016, the band announced its name as Serpentine Dominion and revealed the release date of their debut album.

From December 2013 until mid-2014, Lucas was the touring drummer for Battlecross. Lucas also plays drums for DC Hardcore outfit Damnation A.D..

In 2016 Lucas was tapped to record drums for the debut album of Serpentine Dominion a side project of Killswitch Engage’s Adam Dutkiewicz and Cannibal Corpse vocalist George "Corpsegrinder" Fisher.

== Discography ==
- All That Remains
  - The Fall of Ideals (2006)
- The Black Dahlia Murder
  - Nocturnal (2007)
  - Deflorate (2009)
  - Ritual (2011)
- Battlecross
  - War of Will (2013)
- Serpentine Dominion
  - Serpentine Dominion (2016)

== Equipment ==
Lucas plays on a Tama Starclassic series drum kit, with Sabian Cymbals, and Remo heads. He uses Promark drumsticks. He adds Roland RT-10K acoustic drum triggers to activate an Alesis DM5 digital drum module.
