= Nocturnal (The Black Dahlia Murder album) =

2007 album by the Black Dahlia Murder

Studio album by the Black Dahlia Murder
- Released: September 18, 2007
- Recorded: May – June 2007
- Studio: Trax East Studio in South River, New Jersey
- Genre: Melodic death metal
- Length: 34:39
- Label: Metal Blade
- Producers: Jason Suecof; The Black Dahlia Murder

The Black Dahlia Murder chronology
Miasma (2005)	Nocturnal (2007)	Deflorate (2009)

Professional ratings
Review scores
Source	Rating
AllMusic	3.5/5 stars
Daily Dischord	2.5/5 stars
Lambgoat	7/10
Music Emissions	4/5 stars

Nocturnal is the third studio album by American melodic death metal band the Black Dahlia Murder. It was released through Metal Blade Records on September 18, 2007, and is the band's first album to feature bassist Bart Williams, who replaced Dave Lock, and drummer Shannon Lucas. It is also the last album to feature longtime guitarist John Kempainen. It is widely regarded by fans and critics as the band's magnum opus.

== Background ==
The name of the second track "What a Horrible Night to Have a Curse", is taken from the name of the band's debut demo release of the same name, which in turn is a quote from the 1988 video game Castlevania II: Simon's Quest; the song is featured on the soundtrack for the video game Saints Row 2 and as downloadable content for Rock Band. Kristian Wåhlin did the cover art for the album. The end of the song "Nocturnal" features an audio clip from the 1987 film The Monster Squad. The song "Deathmask Divine" appears to be inspired by both the story of Carl von Cosel and the 1979 Italian horror film Beyond the Darkness.

== Track listing ==
All lyrics are written by Trevor Strnad; all music is composed by Brian Eschbach and the Black Dahlia Murder.

No.	Title	Length
1.	"Everything Went Black"	3:17
2.	"What a Horrible Night to Have a Curse"	3:50
3.	"Virally Yours"	3:05
4.	"I Worship Only What You Bleed"	1:59
5.	"Nocturnal"	3:13
6.	"Deathmask Divine"	3:37
7.	"Of Darkness Spawned"	3:22
8.	"Climactic Degradation"	2:39
9.	"To a Breathless Oblivion"	4:57
10.	"Warborn"	4:40
Total length:		34:39

== Personnel ==
The Black Dahlia Murder

- Trevor Strnad – lead vocals
- Brian Eschbach – rhythm guitar, backing vocals
- John Kempainen – lead guitar
- Ryan "Bart" Williams – bass
- Shannon Lucas – drums

Production

- Executive producer: Brian Slagel
- Produced by Jason Suecof and the Black Dahlia Murder
- Engineered by Mark Lewis and Eric Rachel, with assistance by Eric Kvortek
- Mixed by Jason Suecof
- Vocals engineered by Kyle Neeley (also assistant engineer)

== Chart positions ==
Chart (2007)	Peak position
US Billboard 200	72
US Independent Albums (Billboard)	6
US Top Rock Albums (Billboard)	20
