= War of Will (album) =

Studio album by Battlecross
- Released: July 9, 2013
- Recorded: 2013 at Audiohammer Studio, Sanford, Florida
- Genre: Melodic death metal, thrash metal
- Length: 36:07
- Label: Metal Blade Records
- Producer: Eyal Levi & Mark Lewis

Battlecross chronology
Pursuit of Honor (2011)	War of Will (2013)	Rise to Power (2015)

Professional ratings
Review scores
Source	Rating
AllMusic	4/5 stars

War of Will is the second studio album by American extreme metal band Battlecross. Produced at Audiohammer Studios in Sanford, FL, the work was released on July 9, 2013 via Metal Blade Records peaking at No. 2 on Heatseekers Albums during its first month while debuting at No. 134 on Billboard 200.

== Production ==
Percussion for the album was performed by Shannon Lucas, formerly of The Black Dahlia Murder, after drummer Michael Kreger and the band parted ways. Additionally, Jason Suecof performed a string solo for the work.

== Track listing ==
No.	Title	Length
1.	"Force Fed Lies"	3:20
2.	"Flesh & Bone"	3:29
3.	"Never Coming Back"	2:24
4.	"My Vaccine"	4:20
5.	"Get Over It"	4:59
6.	"Ghost Alive"	3:19
7.	"Wage a War"	3:25
8.	"The Will to Overcome"	3:48
9.	"Beast"	3:56
10.	"Never-Ending Night"	3:07
Total length:		36:07

== Personnel ==
- Kyle Gunther – vocals
- Tony Asta – lead guitar
- Hiran Deraniyagala – rhythm guitar
- Don Slater – bass
- Shannon Lucas - drums

== Chart performance ==
Chart (2013)	Peak position
US Heatseekers Albums (Billboard)	2
US Billboard 200 (Billboard)	134
