= Nightbringers =

2017 studio album by the Black Dahlia Murder

Studio album by the Black Dahlia Murder
- Released: October 6, 2017
- Studio: The Pipeyard Studio in Plymouth, Michigan (drums); Regal Fecal Studios in Warren, Michigan (rhythm guitars and bass); The Shred Light District in Wyckoff, New Jersey (lead guitar); Castle Strnad in Auburn Hills, Michigan (vocals)
- Genre: Melodic death metal
- Length: 33:16
- Label: Metal Blade Records
- Producer: The Black Dahlia Murder

The Black Dahlia Murder chronology
| Abysmal (2015) | Nightbringers (2017) | Verminous (2020) |

Professional ratings
Aggregate scores
| Source | Rating |
|---|---|
| Metacritic | 85/100 |
Review scores
| Source | Rating |
| Alternative Press | 4/5 stars |
| Metal Injection | 10/10 stars |

Nightbringers is the eighth studio album by American melodic death metal band the Black Dahlia Murder. This is the first album to feature Brandon Ellis on lead guitar, replacing Ryan Knight. It was released on October 6, 2017, through Metal Blade Records. Nightbringers became the best-selling direct-to-consumer pre-order in Metal Blade Records' history.

== Track listing ==
All lyrics are written by Trevor Strnad; all music is composed by the Black Dahlia Murder.

Standard Edition
| No. | Title | Length |
|---|---|---|
| 1. | "Widowmaker" | 3:21 |
| 2. | "Of God and Serpent, of Spectre and Snake" | 3:49 |
| 3. | "Matriarch" | 3:24 |
| 4. | "Nightbringers" | 3:35 |
| 5. | "Jars" | 3:37 |
| 6. | "Kings of the Nightworld" | 3:13 |
| 7. | "Catacomb Hecatomb" | 3:37 |
| 8. | "As Good as Dead" | 3:34 |
| 9. | "The Lonely Deceased" | 5:06 |
| Total length: | | 33:16 |

Japanese edition bonus tracks
| No. | Title | Length |
|---|---|---|
| 10. | "Gone But Not Forgotten" | 01:15 |
| 11. | "This Mortal Coil" (Carcass cover) | 03:47 |
| 12. | "The Swarm" (At The Gates cover) | 03:19 |
| 13. | "Abysmal" (live) | 04:06 |
| 14. | "When the Last Grave Has Emptied" (live) | 03:30 |
| Total length: | | 49:13 |

== Personnel ==
=== Musicians ===
- Trevor Strnad – lead vocals
- Brian Eschbach – rhythm guitar, backing vocals
- Brandon Ellis – lead guitar, backing vocals
- Max Lavelle – bass
- Alan Cassidy – drums

=== Additional personnel ===
- The Black Dahlia Murder – production
- Ryan Williams – recording (drums, rhythm guitar, bass)
- Brandon Ellis - recording (lead guitar)
- Joe Cincotta - recording (vocals)
- Ross Trinkaus - production (intro on "Widowmaker")
- Jacob Hansen – mixing, mastering
- Kristian Wåhlin – artwork
- Kevin Wight – design
- Brian Slagel – executive production

== Charts ==
| Chart (2017) | Peak position |
|---|---|
| Austrian Albums (Ö3 Austria) | 68 |
| Belgian Albums (Ultratop Wallonia) | 136 |
| Canadian Albums (Billboard) | 38 |
| German Albums (Offizielle Top 100) | 47 |
| Swiss Albums (Schweizer Hitparade) | 97 |
| US Billboard 200 | 35 |
| US Top Hard Rock Albums (Billboard) | 3 |
| US Top Rock Albums (Billboard) | 6 |
