= Everblack (The Black Dahlia Murder album) =

2013 studio album by the Black Dahlia Murder

Studio album by the Black Dahlia Murder
- Released: June 11, 2013
- Studio: Rustbelt Studios in Royal Oak, Michigan (drums); Regal Fecal Studios in Warren, Michigan (guitars and bass); Audio Hammer Studios in Sanford, Florida (lead guitar and vocals)
- Genre: Melodic death metal
- Length: 44:33
- Label: Metal Blade
- Producer: The Black Dahlia Murder; Ryan Williams

The Black Dahlia Murder chronology
Ritual (2011)	Everblack (2013)	Abysmal (2015)

Singles from Everblack
- 1. "Into the Everblack" Released: April 9, 2013; 2. "Goat of Departure" Released: May 28, 2013

Professional ratings
Aggregate scores
Source	Rating
Metacritic	72/100
Review scores
Source	Rating
AllMusic	4/5 stars
About.com	3/5 stars
Blabbermouth.net	8.5/10 stars
Metalsucks	4.5/5 stars

Everblack is the sixth studio album by American melodic death metal band the Black Dahlia Murder. The album was released through Metal Blade Records on June 11, 2013. It is the first release by the band to feature drummer Alan Cassidy and bassist Max Lavelle.

The album sold 13,000 copies in the United States in its first week of release and debuted at #32 on the Billboard 200.

== Background ==
Everblack is the first album to feature new drummer Alan Cassidy, who replaced Shannon Lucas, and new bassist Max Lavelle, who replaced Ryan "Bart" Williams. Vocalist Trevor Strnad has stated in an interview that the album's name and content was an artistic rebuttal to the speculation that the band had "changed direction" as a result of participating in the 2013 Warped Tour. Everblack was recorded at various studios: the drums were recorded at Rustbelt Studios, the guitar and bass parts were recorded at Regal Fecal, and the lead guitar and vocal parts were recorded at Audiohammer Studios. Former bassist Ryan Williams served as co-producer and engineer for the album. The cover art was created by artist Nick Keller.

== Track listing ==
All lyrics are written by Trevor Strnad; all music is composed by the Black Dahlia Murder.

Standard Edition
No.	Title	Music	Length
1.	"In Hell Is Where She Waits for Me"		5:20
2.	"Goat of Departure"	Brian Eschbach	3:52
3.	"Into the Everblack"		4:34
4.	"Raped in Hatred by Vines of Thorn"		4:33
5.	"Phantom Limb Masturbation"		5:10
6.	"Control"	Ryan Knight	3:26
7.	"Blood Mine"	Ryan Knight	3:26
8.	"Every Rope a Noose"		3:52
9.	"Their Beloved Absentee"		5:01
10.	"Map of Scars"		5:19
Total length:			44:33

Japanese Edition Bonus Track
No.	Title	Length
11.	"Seppuku"	3:51

== Personnel ==
The Black Dahlia Murder

- Brian Eschbach – rhythm guitar, backing vocals
- Trevor Strnad – lead vocals
- Ryan Knight – lead guitar
- Max Lavelle – bass
- Alan Cassidy – drums

Additional personnel

- David Mahler - Hammer Dulcimer
- Mike McKensie - Intro speech on "In Hell Is Where She Waits for Me"
- Jannina Norpoth - violin

Production

- Produced by the Black Dahlia Murder, Ryan "Bart" Williams
- Mixing by Jason Suecof, Ryan "Bart" Williams, Alan Douches
- Mastering by Alan Douches

== Chart positions ==
Chart (2013)	Peak position
Belgian Albums (Ultratop Flanders)	180
Belgian Albums (Ultratop Wallonia)	161
German Albums (Offizielle Top 100)	91
Japanese Albums (Oricon)	151
UK Independent Albums (OCC)	8
UK Rock & Metal Albums (OCC)	25
US Billboard 200	32
US Independent Albums (Billboard)	9
US Top Rock Albums (Billboard)	13
