= Servitude (album) =

Studio album by the Black Dahlia Murder
- Released: September 27, 2024
- Genre: Melodic death metal
- Length: 32:49
- Label: Metal Blade
- Producers: Brandon Ellis; Mark Lewis

The Black Dahlia Murder chronology
Verminous (2020)	Servitude (2024)

Singles from Servitude
- 1. "Aftermath" Released: June 13, 2024; 2. "Mammoth's Hand" Released: August 6, 2024

Professional ratings
Review scores
Source	Rating
Distorted Sound Mag	8/10
Kerrang!	4/5 stars
Metal Hammer	4/5 stars
Metal Storm	7.7/10
MetalSucks	4/5 stars

Servitude is the tenth studio album by American melodic death metal band the Black Dahlia Murder, released on September 27, 2024, through Metal Blade Records. This is the band's first studio album since Verminous (2020), marking the longest gap between studio albums in their career, and their first after the death of former lead vocalist Trevor Strnad, with Brian Eschbach taking over vocals. It is also The Black Dahlia Murder's first album to feature guitarist Ryan Knight since Abysmal (2015), and their final to feature guitarist Brandon Ellis before his departure in February 2025. With a run time of 32 minutes and 49 seconds, it is the shortest The Black Dahlia Murder album to date.

== Background ==
On May 11, 2022, the band announced that lead vocalist Trevor Strnad had died. While no cause of death was given, the phone number for the National Suicide Prevention Lifeline was provided at the end of the band's statement. A few months later, on September 14, the band announced that they would be holding a tribute concert on October 28 at Saint Andrew's Hall in the band's hometown of Detroit. It was also announced that rhythm guitarist and backing vocalist Brian Eschbach would become the band's new lead vocalist and that Ryan Knight would be returning to the band as its new rhythm guitarist.

In November 2023, it was announced that the Black Dahlia Murder had entered the studio to record its next studio album and would be releasing it in 2024.

On June 13, 2024, the Black Dahlia Murder announced Servitude with the release of its lead single, "Aftermath". Eschbach spoke about the soundscape of the album: "We wanted that very aggressive Black Dahlia melodic death metal feel coming right at you. Lyrically, it's about a meteor that fucks up the whole planet, but there's still people living."

On August 6, the second single from the album, "Mammoth's Hand", was released. An animated music video for the single premiered later that day.

== Track listing ==
All lyrics are written by Brian Eschbach.

Servitude track listing
No.	Title	Music	Length
1.	"Evening Ephemeral"	Eschbach	3:55
2.	"Panic Hysteric"	Ellis	3:07
3.	"Aftermath"	Eschbach	3:02
4.	"Cursed Creator"	Knight	3:35
5.	"An Intermission"	Knight	0:29
6.	"Asserting Dominion"	Knight	3:31
7.	"Servitude"	Ellis	3:28
8.	"Mammoth's Hand"	Knight	3:54
9.	"Transcosmic Blueprint"	Ellis	3:48
10.	"Utopia Black"	Eschbach	4:00
Total length:			32:49

== Personnel ==
The Black Dahlia Murder

- Brian Eschbach – lead vocals
- Brandon Ellis – lead guitar, backing vocals
- Ryan Knight – rhythm guitar, backing vocals
- Max Lavelle – bass
- Alan Cassidy – drums

Technical

- Brandon Ellis – production, mixing, engineering
- Mark Lewis – production, mixing, drum recording engineering
- Ted Jensen – mastering

== Charts ==
Chart performance for Servitude
Chart (2024)	Peak position
Austrian Albums (Ö3 Austria)	49
German Albums (Offizielle Top 100)	55
Scottish Albums (Official Charts)	97
UK Album Downloads (Official Charts)	69
UK Albums Sales (OCC)	89
UK Independent Albums (Official Charts)	41
UK Physical Albums (OCC)	98
UK Rock & Metal Albums (Official Charts)	15
US Top Albums Sales (Billboard)	11
