= Pursuit of Honor (album) =

Studio album by Battlecross
- Released: August 2, 2011
- Recorded: 2011 at Random Awesome Recording Studio in Bay City, Michigan
- Genre: Melodic death metal, thrash metal
- Length: 36:27
- Label: Metal Blade Records
- Producer: Josh Schroeder

Battlecross chronology
Push Pull Destroy (2010)	Pursuit of Honor (2011)	War of Will (2013)

Pursuit of Honor is the debut studio album by American extreme metal band Battlecross. The album was released on August 2, 2011 via Metal Blade Records.

== Production ==
In 2010, Battlecross self-released their debut album Push Pull Destroy. In late 2010, the band caught the eye of Metal Blade Records while members were replacing their vocalist, Marshall Wood. The band tapped Kyle "Gumby" Gunther of the Flint, MI-area band and management roster mate, I Decay, to front the band. Gunther stepped in to re-record the album and rewrote the track Aiden, renaming it Kaleb after his newborn son. The re-recorded album, Pursuit of Honor, was released in August 2011 by Metal Blade Records and was recorded at Random Awesome Recording Studio in Bay City, Michigan and produced by Josh Schroeder.

== Critical reception ==
Pursuit of Honor produced three singles. "Push Pull Destroy", "Man of Stone" and "Breaking You", which combined, spent 50 weeks on SiriusXM Liquid Metal 'Devil's Dozen' list of most requested songs, with ‘Push Pull Destroy’ at the #1 spot for five weeks in Spring 2012. The accompanying video received more than 1.8 million views on YouTube and was the break-out track for the band.

Valkyrian Music described it as "perhaps one of the best albums on the modern thrash metal scene" and claimed they could easily replace the Big Four of thrash metal if they kept making albums like Pursuit of Honor. The band and the debut also drew comparisons to metal groove metal bands Pantera and Lamb of God, with Metal Assault naming the record "one of the most 'complete' heavy metal albums in recent times" and "bristling with fist-pumping, face-melting heavy metal at its finest."

Blabbermouth reviewed the album as "easily one of the better metal debuts of 2011," stating that Pursuit of Honor will leave you breathless, maybe even skinless" and giving the album an '8' rating. The website described the album as "traditional thrash metal, but not in a retro wannabe sense, and is delivered in a package that is modern, yet avoids being too cookie-cutter; melodic, yet not "pretty" or cleanly sung. Death metal heaviness with compositional skill, "Pursuit of Honor" is above all else inanely energized."

== Track listing ==
No.	Title	Length
1.	"Pursuit of Honor"	0:38
2.	"Push Pull Destroy"	3:35
3.	"Kaleb"	3:39
4.	"Deception"	3:28
5.	"Man of Stone"	3:47
6.	"Breaking You"	3:55
7.	"Rupture"	3:49
8.	"Leech"	2:46
9.	"Better Off Dead"	4:10
10.	"Misery"	4:49
11.	"Foreshadowing"	1:41
Total length:		36:27

== Personnel ==
Battlecross

- Kyle "Gumby" Gunther – vocals
- Tony Asta – lead guitar
- Hiran Deraniyagala – rhythm guitar
- Don Slater – bass
- Mike Kreger – drums
