= Deflorate (album) =

Studio album by the Black Dahlia Murder
- Released: September 15, 2009
- Studio: John Blanche, Birmingham, Michigan (drums); Top Thrill, Birmingham (guitars and bass); Audio Hammer, Sanford, Florida (vocals)
- Genre: Melodic death metal
- Length: 34:00
- Label: Metal Blade
- Producer: The Black Dahlia Murder; Jason Suecof; Mark Lewis

The Black Dahlia Murder chronology
Nocturnal (2007)	Deflorate (2009)	Ritual (2011)

Singles from Deflorate
- 1. "A Selection Unnatural" Released: August 11, 2009

Professional ratings
Review scores
Source	Rating
About.com	2.5/5 stars
AllMusic	3.5/5 stars
Blabbermouth	8.5/10
Lambgoat	7/10
PopMatters	7/10

Deflorate is the fourth studio album by American melodic death metal band the Black Dahlia Murder. Released through Metal Blade Records on September 15, 2009. The album sold 12,000 copies in the United States in its first week of release and debuted at position #43 on the Billboard 200.

== Background ==
Deflorate is the first album to feature new guitarist Ryan Knight, who replaced John Kempainen. Trevor has stated in an interview that the album has more of a "classic feel" and that the drums have more of a "live sound". Trevor has also touched on the lyrical subjects of some songs, such as "I Will Return" being about cryogenic freezing. The third track of the album, "A Selection Unnatural", was made available for streaming on July 7, 2009, through the Revolver website. The cover art was painted by Tony Koehl. The album comes with a bonus DVD titled "We're Going Places (We've Never Been Before)" that contains tour footage from around the world as well as in-studio recording footage. A video for "Necropolis" was made available at the Revolver website on September 4, 2009. "Necropolis" is also a free song for the IOS rhythm game Tap Tap Revenge 3 and was a part of the soundtrack for the 2011 video game Saint's Row: The Third. The album reached number 43 on the Billboard 200 in one week.

== Track listing ==
All lyrics are written by Trevor Strnad.

No.	Title	Music	Length
1.	"Black Valor"	Brian Eschbach	3:09
2.	"Necropolis"	Eschbach	3:30
3.	"A Selection Unnatural"	Ryan Williams; Eschbach	2:50
4.	"Denounced, Disgraced"	Eschbach	3:43
5.	"Christ Deformed"	Williams; Eschbach	3:31
6.	"Death Panorama"	Eschbach	1:54
7.	"Throne of Lunacy"	Ryan Knight; Eschbach	3:34
8.	"Eyes of Thousand"	Eschbach	3:13
9.	"That Which Erodes the Most Tender of Things"	Eschbach	3:01
10.	"I Will Return"	Knight; Eschbach	5:35
Total length:			34:00

== Personnel ==
The Black Dahlia Murder

- Trevor Strnad – vocals
- Ryan Knight – guitar, guitar solos
- Brian Eschbach – guitar
- Ryan Williams – bass
- Shannon Lucas – drums

Production

- Produced by Jason Suecof, Mark Lewis and the Black Dahlia Murder

Additional personnel

- Jason Suecof – outro guitar solo on "I Will Return"

== Album charts ==
Chart (2009)	Peak position
US Billboard 200	43
Billboard's Top Independent Albums	5
Billboard's Top Hard Music Albums	4
HITS Top 50 Albums	50
Canada Billboard Charts	52
Top Independent Albums	3
Top Hard Music Albums	6
