= Ritual (The Black Dahlia Murder album) =

2011 album by the Black Dahlia Murder

Studio album by the Black Dahlia Murder
- Released: June 17, 2011 (Europe)
- Studios: Rustbelt in Royal Oak, Michigan; Regal Fecal in Ferndale, Michigan; TBDM's practice space in Warren, Michigan; Audio Hammer in Sanford, Florida
- Genre: Melodic death metal
- Length: 45:27
- Label: Metal Blade
- Producers: The Black Dahlia Murder; Jason Suecof; Mark Lewis

The Black Dahlia Murder chronology
Deflorate (2009)	Ritual (2011)	Everblack (2013)

Singles from Ritual
- 1. "Moonlight Equilibrium" Released: April 28, 2011

Professional ratings
Aggregate scores
Source	Rating
Metacritic	82/100
Review scores
Source	Rating
AllMusic	4/5 stars
Blabbermouth.net	8.5/10
Revolver	4/5 stars
Rock Sound	9/10
Sputnikmusic	3.5/5 stars

Ritual is the fifth studio album by American melodic death metal band the Black Dahlia Murder. It was released in 2011 on June 17 in Europe and on June 21 in North America via Metal Blade Records. It is the band's last record to feature Ryan "Bart" Williams on bass and Shannon Lucas on drums. The album sold 12,960 copies in the United States in its first week of release and debuted at No. 31 on the Billboard 200. The album has sold 51,000 copies in the US as of September 2015.

== Production and recording ==
The album was once again produced by Mark Lewis, who also worked on the band's 2009 album Deflorate. Frontman Trevor Strnad considers Ritual "the most focused Black Dahlia Murder strike of all time."

"The whole thread of the songs is more tied together than ever before," explains Strnad. "Part of it was kind of like, 'What can we do that's the most Black Dahlia Murder thing? What's going to be the most quintessential Black Dahlia Murder thing we can do?' That's kind of what we set our foothold in. And 'Ritual', it just lends itself to that — it's mysticism and magic and all of that. Everyone has an association with some kind of ritual, so we just thought it was the next logical step."

Recalling the writing process that led to Ritual's eventual twelve songs, Strnad says that "every song that got brought forth was exciting and more three-dimensional, more twists and turns, more surprises. There's more ups and downs and taking people on a journey this time."

Co-founder Brian Eschbach, meanwhile, credits the presence of fellow guitarist Ryan Knight, who joined the band during Deflorate, with helping to move things forward on this particular venture. "It's been more collaborative than it's been in years," Eschbach notes. "The last two albums (Deflorate and 2007's Nocturnal) I wrote most of the music, and this one it's almost a 50-50 effort between me and (Knight). He lifted what we were doing on the last album so much from what we've done before, his different techniques and stylings that he knows how to wield. It's really exciting for us to have that be part of the band now." Strnad adds that Knight "is an educated musician, and he's brought that kind of aspect into the band, too. We came to him having higher expectations, and he's exceeded all of those [...] And I would say this time, with 'Ritual', we really nailed it even harder than we have before."

The first lyrics in the first track, "A Shrine to Madness", are a reference to a quote which appeared in the 1997 video game Castlevania: Symphony of the Night.

== Promotion and release ==
The song "Moonlight Equilibrium" was made available for streaming on April 29, 2011 at Metal Blade's web site. The song "Conspiring with the Damned" became available for streaming on May 17, 2011 via lambgoat.com. Audio samples of all the tracks that are set to appear on "Ritual" were available for streaming at Amazon.com the 7th May. The entire album was made available for public streaming on June 14, 2011 on MSN. The album was released on June 17 in Europe and on June 21 in North America via Metal Blade Records.

== Track listing ==
All lyrics are written by Trevor Strnad; all music is composed by the Black Dahlia Murder.

No.	Title	Length
1.	"A Shrine to Madness" (Ritual of Celebration)	4:40
2.	"Moonlight Equilibrium" (Ritual of Transformation)	3:28
3.	"On Stirring Seas of Salted Blood" (Ritual of Condemnation)	4:42
4.	"Conspiring with the Damned" (Ritual of Communication)	3:44
5.	"The Window" (Ritual of Abduction)	3:39
6.	"Carbonized in Cruciform" (Ritual of Conjuration)	4:46
7.	"Den of the Picquerist" (Ritual of Mutilation)	1:30
8.	"Malenchantments of the Necrosphere" (Ritual of Condemnation)	4:18
9.	"The Grave Robber's Work" (Ritual of Desecration)	3:37
10.	"The Raven" (Ritual of Observation)	2:58
11.	"Great Burning Nullifier" (Ritual of Emancipation)	3:25
12.	"Blood in the Ink" (Ritual of Indoctrination)	4:40
Total length:		45:27

== Personnel ==
The Black Dahlia Murder

- Trevor Strnad – lead vocals
- Brian Eschbach – guitar
- Ryan Knight – lead guitar
- Ryan "Bart" Williams – bass
- Shannon Lucas – drums

Additional personnel

- Jannina Norpoth and John-Paul Norpoth - strings
- Eric Hoegemeyer - piano on "Carbonized in Cruciform"

Production

- Jason Suecof – production, engineering, mixing
- Mark Lewis – production, engineering, mixing
- Alan Douches – mastering
- Jean-Emmanuel "Valnoir" Simoulin – artwork, design, photography
- Brian Slagel – executive producer
