= The Black Dahlia Murder (band) =

American melodic death metal band

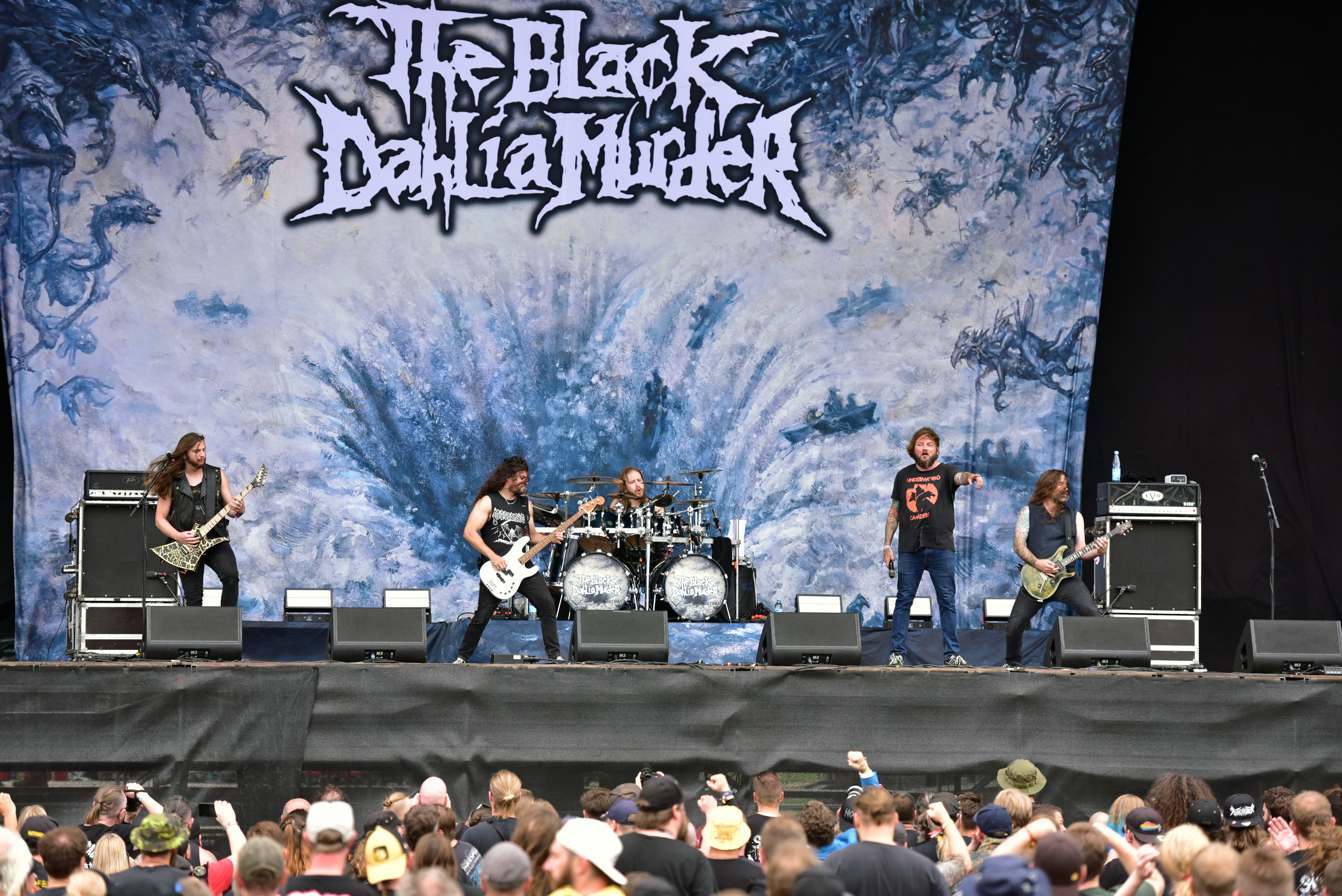
- The Black Dahlia Murder in 2024

Background information
- Origin: Waterford, Michigan, U.S.
- Genre: Melodic death metal
- Years active: 2001–present
- Label: Metal Blade
- Members: Brian Eschbach; Max Lavelle; Alan Cassidy; Ryan Knight
- Past members: Trevor Strnad; John Deering; Mike Schepman; Cory Grady; Sean Gauvreau; John Kempainen; David Lock; Ryan "Bart" Williams; Zach Gibson; Pierre Langlois; Shannon Lucas; Brandon Ellis

The Black Dahlia Murder is an American melodic death metal band from Waterford, Michigan (near Pontiac), formed in 2001. Their name is derived from the 1947 unsolved murder of Elizabeth Short, often referred to as Black Dahlia. As of February 2025, the band consists of lead vocalist Brian Eschbach, bassist Max Lavelle, drummer Alan Cassidy and rhythm guitarist Ryan Knight. The Black Dahlia Murder has undergone various lineup changes, with Eschbach and Trevor Strnad remaining the only constant members, until the latter's death in 2022, which then saw Eschbach take over lead vocals and Knight (who was the band's lead guitarist from 2009 to 2016) replacing him on rhythm guitar.

Following the release of a 2001 demo album and a 2002 EP, the Black Dahlia Murder signed to Metal Blade Records in 2003, who released their debut studio album Unhallowed that same year. Out of the nine studio albums the band have released to date, the last eight have charted on the U.S. Billboard 200, with their fifth album Ritual peaking at No. 31 in 2011, marking them as one of the most popular contemporary American extreme metal bands. Their tenth and latest album, Servitude, was released on September 27, 2024.

In 2025, Jeff Mezydlo of Yardbarker included the band in his list of "the greatest metal acts that formed in the 2000s".

== History ==
=== Formation, Unhallowed and Miasma (2001–2006) ===
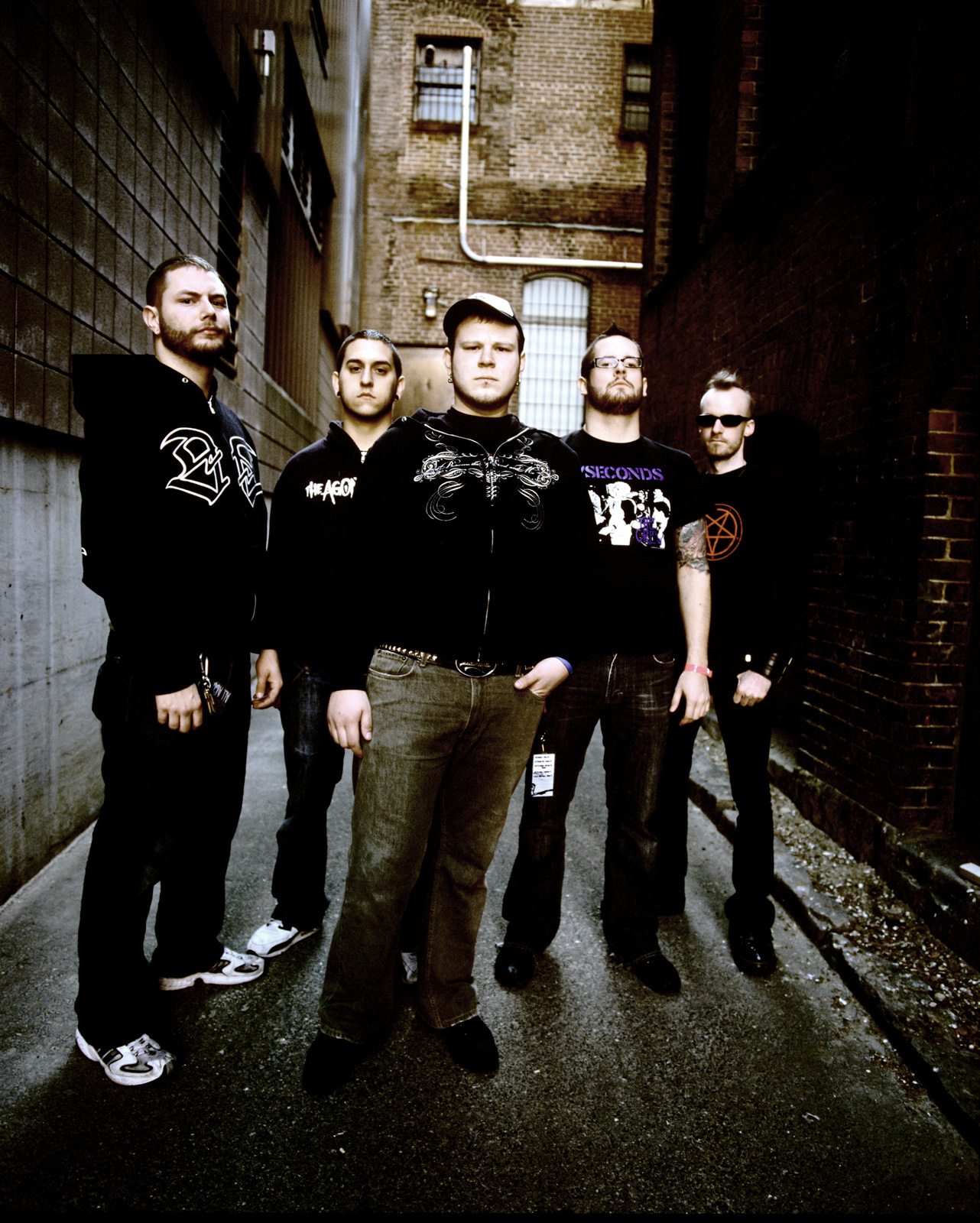
The Black Dahlia Murder in 2006. From left to right: Eschbach, former bassist Ryan Williams, former lead guitarist John Kempainen, Strnad and former drummer Pierre Langlois.

The Black Dahlia Murder began its inception during late 2000 and gained the final band lineup in January 2001. The group released their demo entitled What a Horrible Night to Have a Curse, and a four-track EP, A Cold-Blooded Epitaph, the latter of which the group released on Lovelost Records. After appearing in concerts such as the Milwaukee Metal Fest, the Black Dahlia Murder signed to Metal Blade Records in 2003.

Bassist Ryan "Bart" Williams left his former band, Detroit's Today I Wait, to tour with the Black Dahlia Murder. After touring with the band on their co-headlining gig with Throwdown and their European dates with Liar, he joined the group full-time, replacing former bassist David Lock. Frontman Trevor Strnad said that Lock was fired for incompetency. Williams was one of two engineers (the other being Walls of Jericho's Mike Hasty) on the band's first full-length album, Unhallowed. The band then went on a tour in late 2004 supporting Unearth alongside Terror and Remembering Never throughout the United States.

The band's second album Miasma was released on July 12, 2005, and peaked at No. 118 on the Billboard 200. After touring for Miasma, drummer Zach Gibson left the band along with Pierre Langlois. While Gibson went on to join Abigail Williams, Langlois left the band for a more secure lifestyle, and the band finished their search for a replacement drummer when they found former All That Remains drummer, Shannon Lucas. The group played at Ozzfest 2005.

=== Nocturnal and Deflorate (2006–2010) ===
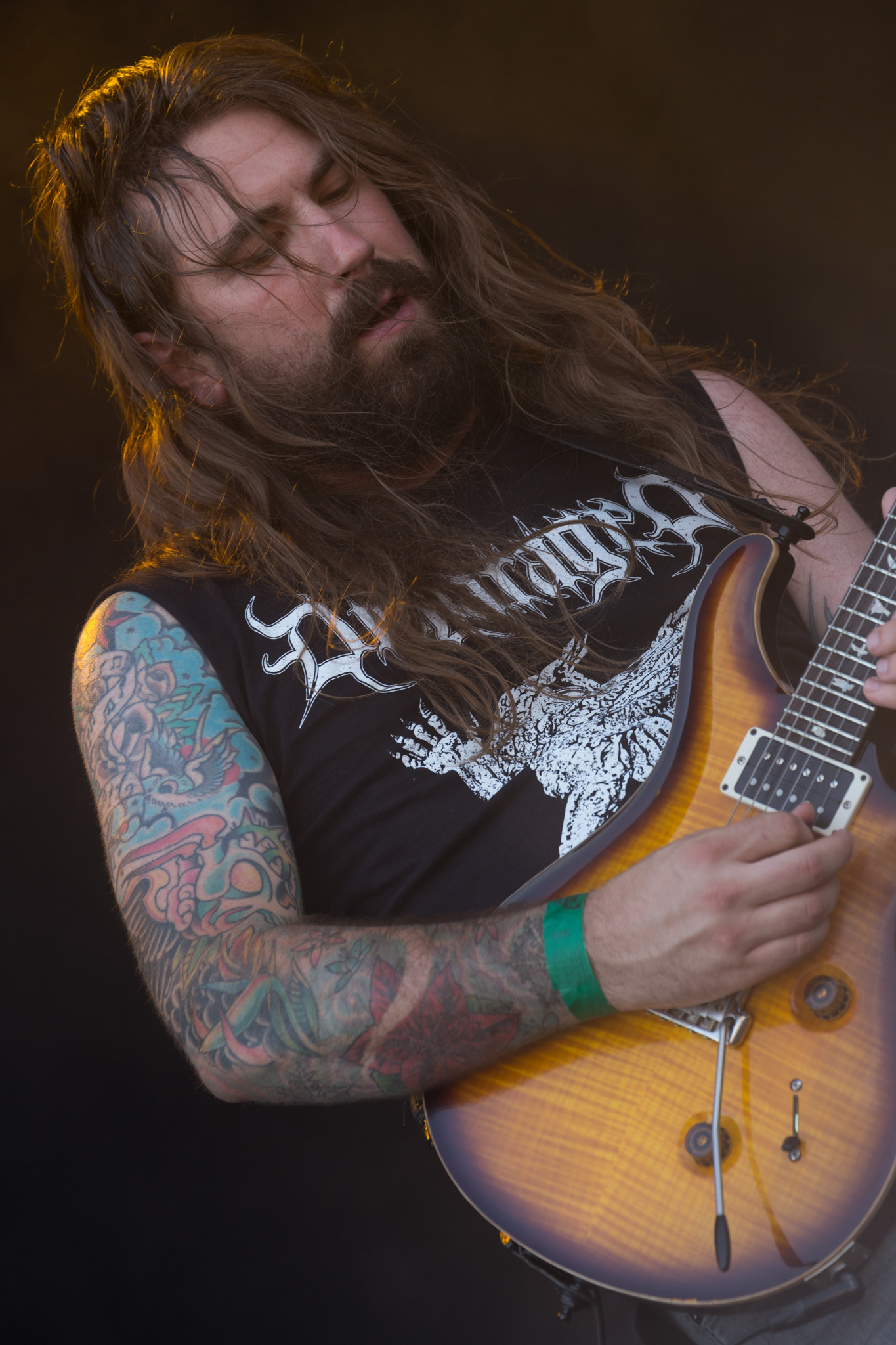
Ryan Knight in 2014

Their third album, entitled Nocturnal, was released on September 18, 2007. The album debuted at No. 72 on the Billboard 200. The Black Dahlia Murder announced via their MySpace profile that they were going on a U.S. tour with Cannibal Corpse to promote their new album Nocturnal and celebrate the 25 years that Metal Blade Records had been in business. They were joined by label-mates The Red Chord, Aeon, The Absence, and Goatwhore. In January/February 2008, the band embarked on a U.S. headlining tour with 3 Inches of Blood, Hate Eternal, and Decrepit Birth, followed by another alongside Brain Drill and Animosity. They were on Hot Topic's "Summer Slaughter Tour" with Kataklysm, Cryptopsy, Vader, Whitechapel, and Despised Icon.

Their longtime lead guitarist, John Kempainen left the band and was replaced by Ryan Knight during the beginning of 2009. In May 2009, the Black Dahlia Murder released their first DVD, "Majesty". The DVD contains a documentary and live footage from the Summer Slaughter tour and their tour supporting Children of Bodom in late 2008. The DVD also contains all of their music videos and behind the scenes footage.

The Black Dahlia Murder released Deflorate on September 15, 2009, via Metal Blade Records. The album sold 12,000 copies in the United States in the first week of the release, debuted at position No. 43 Billboard's Top 200 charts, No. 5 on Billboard's Independent Albums chart, No. 4 on Billboard's Top Hard Music Albums chart, and No. 50 on HITS Top 50 Albums chart. They toured with Children of Bodom and Skeletonwitch in support of the album. After their 2010 headlining tour with Goatwhore and Arkaik, the band began writing and recording their next full-length album.

=== Ritual and member changes (2011–2013) ===
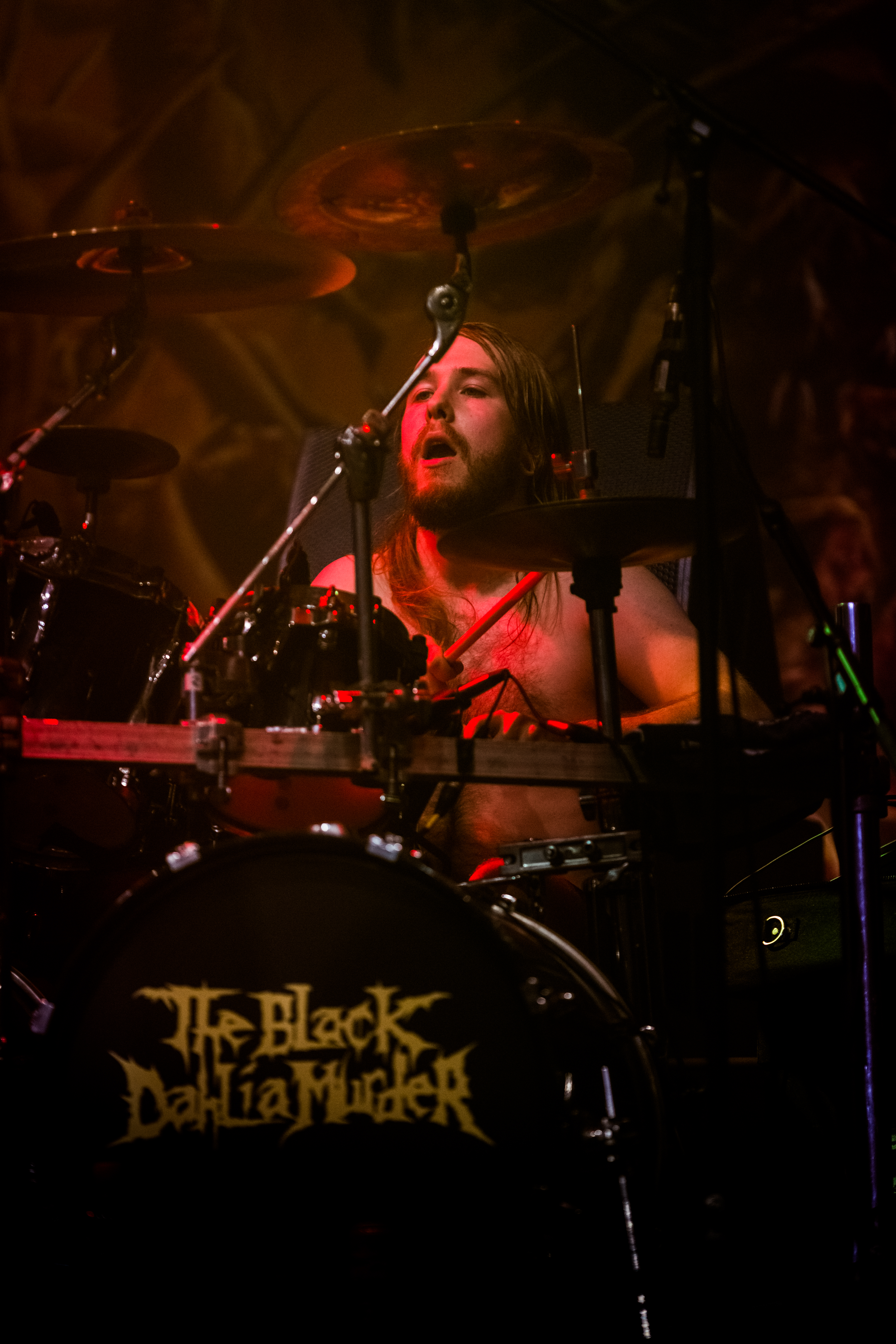
Alan Cassidy in 2016

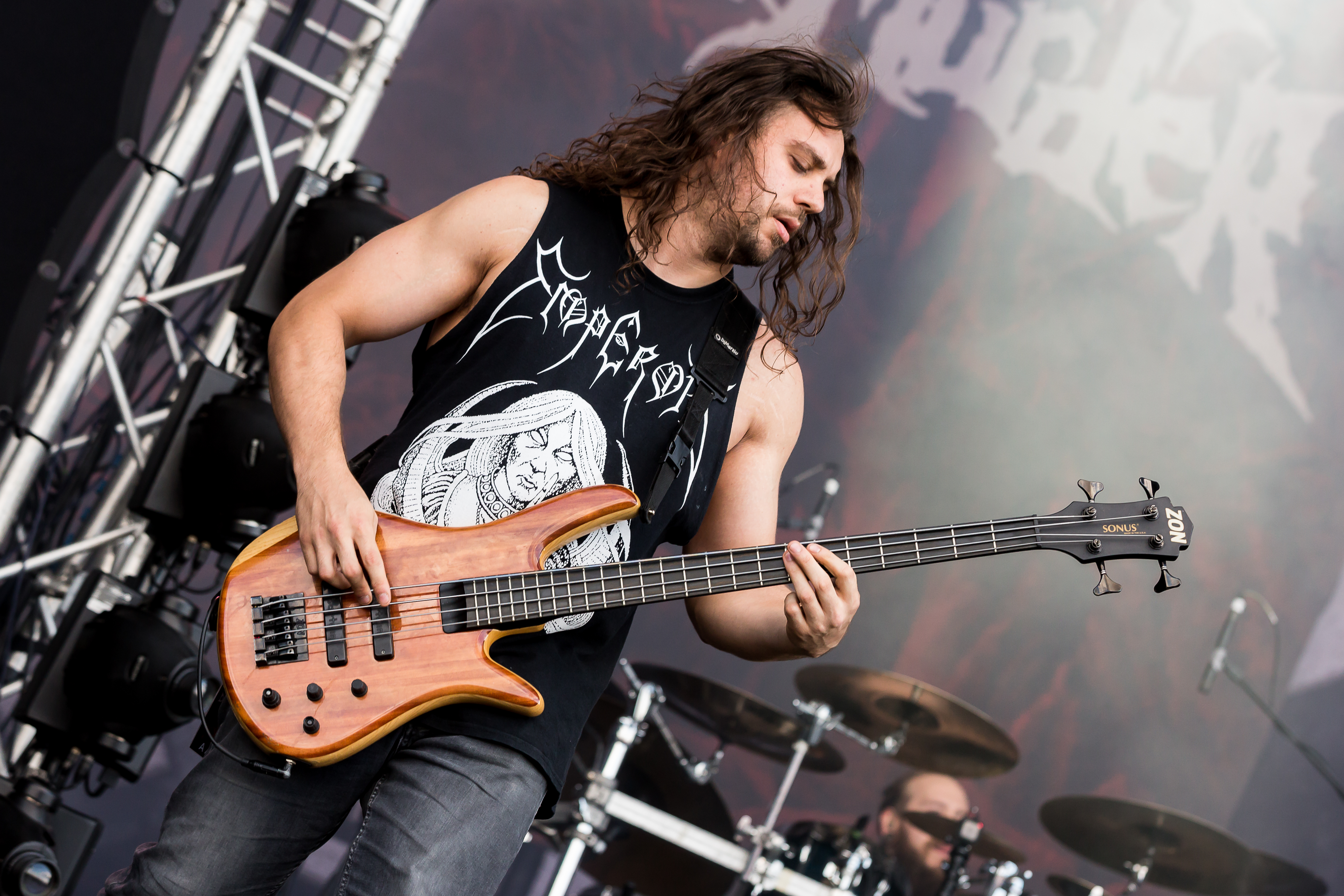
Max Lavelle in 2018

In February 2011, the Black Dahlia Murder completed the songwriting process for their fifth studio album, entitled Ritual. It was released on June 21, 2011, in North America. The band supported Amon Amarth on their May 2011 European tour, as well as headlined the 2011 Summer Slaughter tour, both in support of Ritual. Before the record's release, the track "Moonlight Equilibrium" was posted to the Metal Blade Records website on April 29, 2011, to critical and fan acclaim. A music video for "Moonlight Equilibrium" was released on February 20, 2012. In April 2012 during the New England Metal and Hardcore Festival on the first night performance, Trevor Strnad officially welcomed new bassist Max Lavelle into the band after former bassist Ryan Williams parted ways. They played at Wacken Open Air in August 2012. On November 7, Shannon Lucas announced via a YouTube video that he would be stepping down as drummer of the Black Dahlia Murder to pursue other aspirations. Alan Cassidy of Abigail Williams filled in for Shannon's touring duties.

=== Everblack and Abysmal (2013–2016) ===
In early 2013, despite the news of the departure of two band members (drummer Shannon Lucas and bassist Bart Williams), plans were announced for an upcoming album release, to be entitled Everblack. Tentative plans estimated its release to be early summer 2013, likely June. On April 10, 2013, the iTunes Store was updated with official release and availability information, including cover art, a full track listing, and an official U.S. release date of June 11, 2013. The album has 10 tracks in total. On the same day, the band's first single from Everblack was made available for purchase and download, titled "Into The Everblack". The album itself was then released on June 11 and peaked at No. 32 on the U.S. Billboard 200.

On November 28, 2014 (the day after Thanksgiving), the Black Dahlia Murder released a 7-inch EP titled Grind 'Em All featuring 3 short grindcore covers of punk rock songs: a cover of "Ripped Up" by Left for Dead, of "Rebel Without a Car" by Sedition and of "Populous" by Gyga. The covers were originally recorded almost 10 years earlier during the era of Miasma. The EP was released as part of Record Store Day's Black Friday event via A389 Recordings (rather than the band's label, Metal Blade Records), made available for purchase on the band's online merchandise store and also streamed in its entirety via Exclaim!. The album art for Grind 'Em All was designed by Szymon Siech.

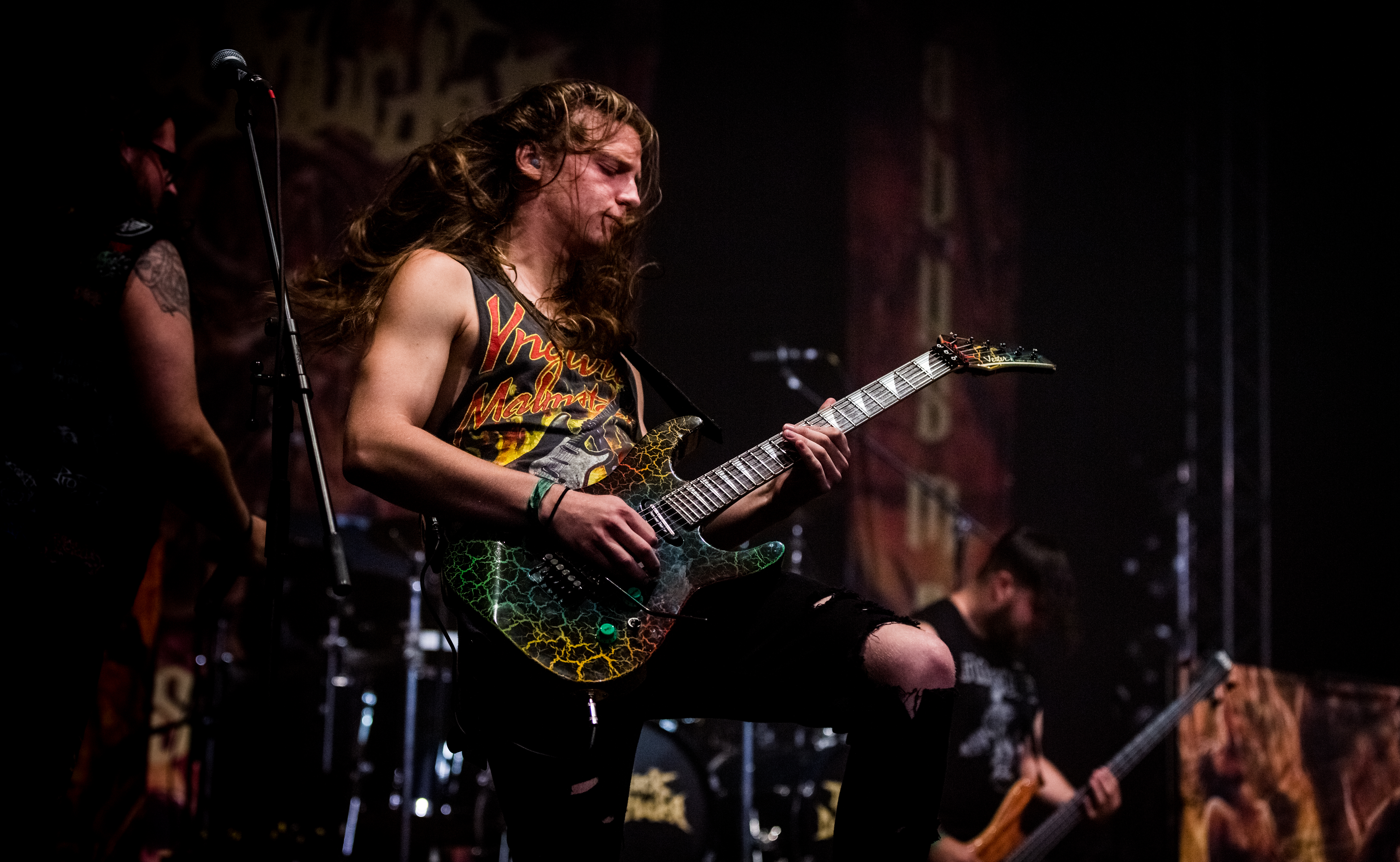
Brandon Ellis in 2016

Lead guitarist Ryan Knight confirmed in early 2015 that the band would deliver a seventh studio release that year, followed by extensive touring, and that he was planning to start working on a solo album afterwards. Vocalist Trevor Strnad stated that the band's new album, titled Abysmal, would be "more raw and natural sounding" and feature "more dynamic and developed songs" than their previous work. "Vlad, Son of the Dragon", the first song from the album, was released online on June 24, followed by "Receipt" on July 22 and "Threat Level No. 3" on August 19. Abysmal was produced by Mark Lewis and Ryan Williams and released worldwide through Metal Blade on September 18. In early February 2016, it was announced that Knight had left the band. He was replaced on lead guitar by Brandon Ellis of Arsis.

=== Nightbringers, Verminous, Strnad's death and Servitude (2017–present) ===
The band's 8th album Nightbringers was released on October 6, 2017, to critical and commercial acclaim, charting at 35 on the Billboard 200.

The Black Dahlia Murder released their ninth studio album, Verminous, on April 17, 2020.

On May 11, 2022, it was announced that the band's frontman Trevor Strnad had died. While no official cause of death has been given, the phone number for the National Suicide Prevention Lifeline was provided at the end of the statement.

On September 14, 2022, the Black Dahlia Murder announced a tribute concert taking place for Trevor Strnad on October 28 at Saint Andrew's Hall in Detroit, supported by Darkest Hour and Plague Years. It was also announced that Brian Eschbach would be stepping down from guitar and taking over vocals, as Eschbach himself said in an interview with Decibel magazine: "I know Trevor would keep this band going if I went down a deep, dark path and weren't here." In Eschbach's place, Ryan Knight returned to the band as their rhythm guitarist.

In November 2023, The Black Dahlia Murder entered the studio to begin recording their tenth studio album for a 2024 release.

On June 13, 2024, the band released the single, "Aftermath", from their tenth studio album, Servitude, which was released on September 27.

On February 20, 2025, Brandon Ellis announced he had departed the band. As of April 2026, the band is on tour with The Acacia Strain, Disembodied Tyrant and Corpse Pile. This tour is scheduled to last until early May.

== Tours ==
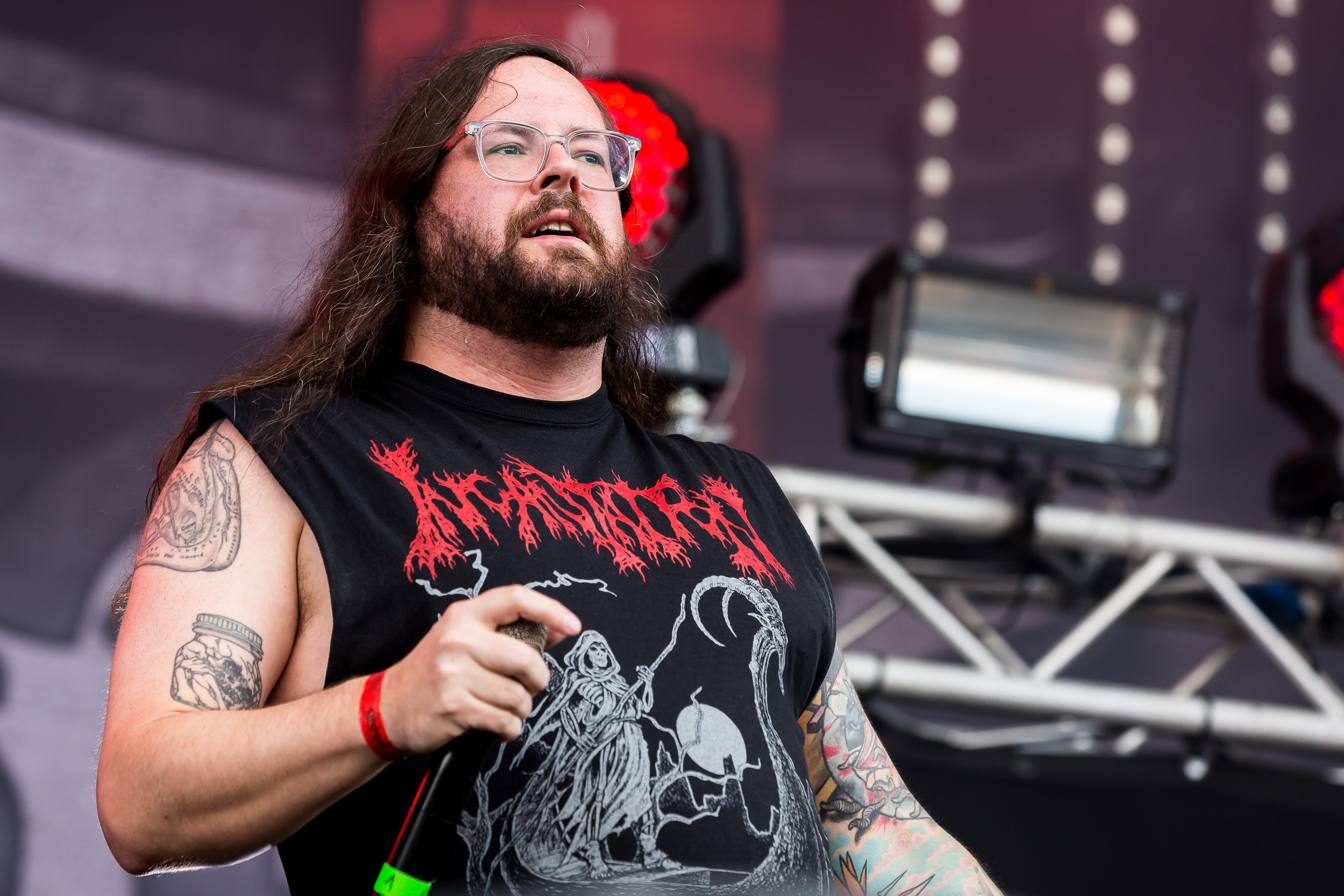
Co-founder and frontman Trevor Strnad in 2018

The Black Dahlia Murder headlined the 2008 Summer Slaughter Tour with Kataklysm, Vader, Cryptopsy, The Faceless, Despised Icon, Aborted, Born of Osiris, Psycroptic, and Whitechapel. In late 2008, they joined a U.S. tour with Finland's Children of Bodom and Raleigh, NC's Between the Buried and Me. They were initially announced as "... with special guests" at the start of the tour, though it was later confirmed by Revolver Magazine that they were on tour. They appeared on the Hot Topic Stage in the 2009 Rockstar Energy Mayhem Festival. In late 2009, they embarked on a U.S. tour with Finland's Children of Bodom and Skeletonwitch. The band headlined the Bonecrusher Fest tour of Europe in Spring 2010 alongside 3 Inches of Blood, Necrophobic, Obscura, The Faceless, Carnifex and Ingested. In August 2010 they played at the Hevy Music Festival near Folkestone, UK. The band played the entire Warped Tour 2013. As a tribute to the 10th anniversary of the Nocturnal album, they headlined the 2017 Summer Slaughter Tour, performing the album in its entirety.

== Musical style and influences ==
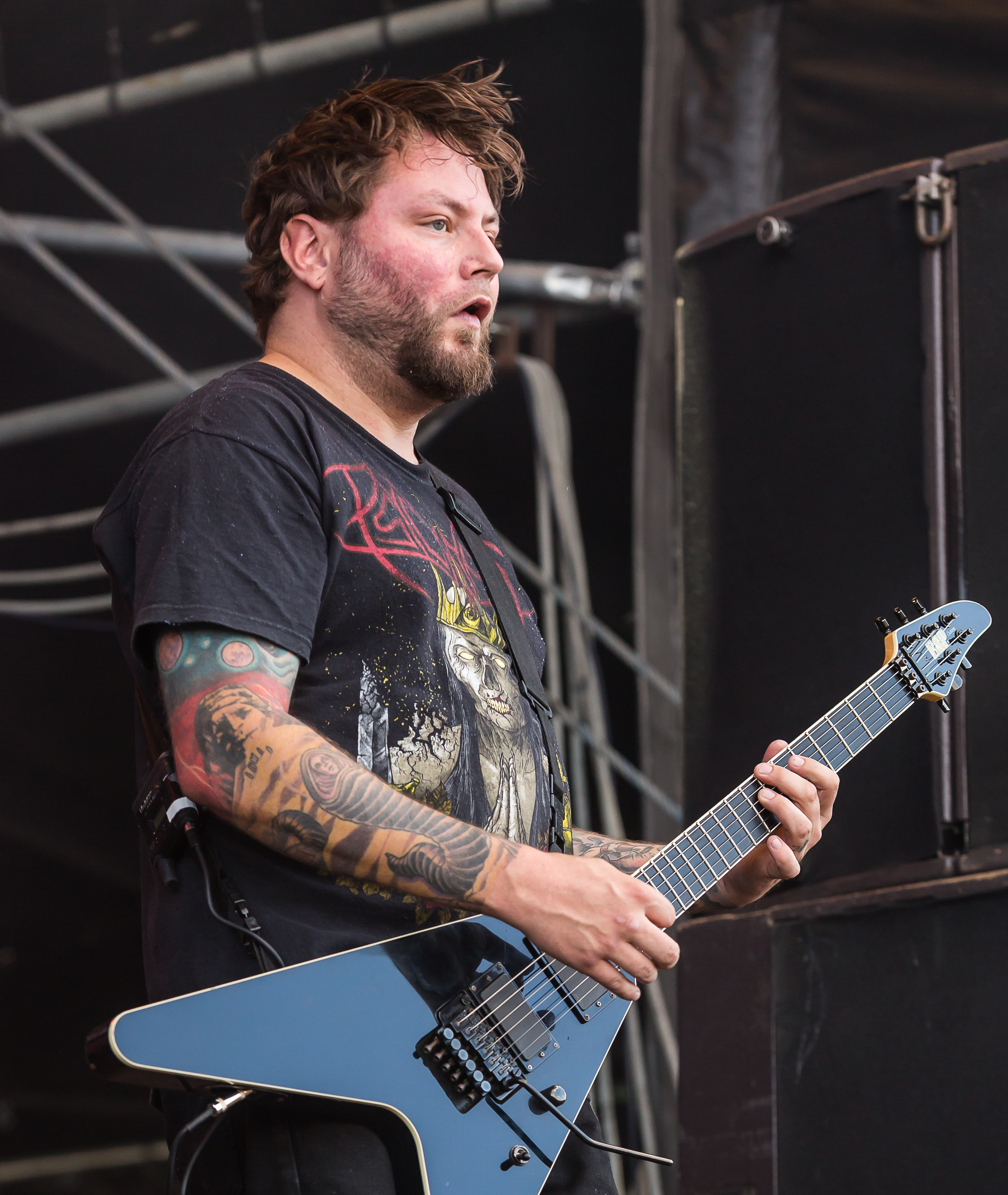
Co-founder and the band's leading songwriter Brian Eschbach

The Black Dahlia Murder is most commonly described as melodic death metal. They have also been described as metalcore in the past, which includes their 2001 demo What a Horrible Night to Have a Curse. Loudwire stated that the band has also been classified under several other "all-encompassing" labels such as "myspace-core" and "scene-core," due to the band's popularity with listeners who the publication described as "the scene kids of Myspace."

Influences for the band include heavy metal bands such as Carcass, At the Gates, Darkane, Dissection, Darkthrone, Morbid Angel, The Haunted, In Flames, Dimension Zero, Iron Maiden, Judas Priest, Metallica, Pantera and Megadeth. Vocalist Trevor Strnad cited on many occasions that he was primarily influenced by Carcass in vocalizing technique.

When asked to describe what kind of music the band plays, Strnad commented:

"I've always said that we're melodic death metal. We are mostly influenced by Swedish bands and Carcass. The heavy end of our sound is the American style creeping in, with some Floridian influences like Morbid Angel, Malevolent Creation and that kind of stuff. We've been labeled more often because of our look than our sound, which is dumb, and speaks volumes about what kind of geniuses are out there!"

However, in an interview with Uranium Magazine, Strnad stated,

"Some bands that get labeled as metalcore are actually good, like Between the Buried and Me or The Red Chord. Metal is what I grew up with, and then I learned about punk and hardcore. But a lot of our ethics, the way we carry ourselves, is more punk... I like that hardcore has a sense of community without the competition you see in metal."

== Band members ==
Current

- Brian Eschbach – lead vocals (2022–present), rhythm guitar, backing vocals (2001–2022)
- Max Lavelle – bass (2012–present)
- Alan Cassidy – drums (2012–present)
- Ryan Knight – rhythm guitar, backing vocals (2022–present), lead guitar (2009–2016, 2025–present)

Current touring musicians

- Wes Hauch – lead guitar (2025–present)

Former

- Trevor Strnad – lead vocals (2001–2022; his death)
- John Deering – lead guitar (2001–2002)
- Mike Schepman – bass (2001)
- Cory Grady – drums (2001–2004)
- Sean Gauvreau – bass (2001–2002)
- John Kempainen – lead guitar (2002–2008)
- David Lock – bass (2002–2005)
- Ryan "Bart" Williams – bass (2005–2012)
- Zach Gibson – drums (2005)
- Pierre Langlois – drums (2006)
- Shannon Lucas – drums (2007–2012)
- Brandon Ellis – lead guitar, backing vocals (2016–2025)

Former touring musicians

- Guy Kozowyk – lead vocals (2025; substitute for Brian Eschbach)

== Discography ==
The Black Dahlia Murder discography
- Studio albums: 10
- Extended plays: 2
- Video albums: 2
- Music videos: 21

=== Studio albums ===
List of studio albums, with selected chart positions
Title	Album details	Peak chart positions					
Title	Album details	US	US Heat.	US Ind.	US Rock	US Hard Rock	GER
Unhallowed	Released: June 17, 2003; Label: Metal Blade; Format: CD, digital download, vinyl	—	—	—	—	—	—
Miasma	Released: July 12, 2005; Label: Metal Blade; Format: CD, digital download, vinyl	118	1	5	—	—	—
Nocturnal	Released: September 18, 2007; Label: Metal Blade; Format: CD, digital download	72	—	6	20	7	—
Deflorate	Released: September 15, 2009; Label: Metal Blade; Format: CD, digital download, vinyl	43	—	5	15	4	—
Ritual	Released: June 17, 2011; Label: Metal Blade; Format: CD, digital download, vinyl	31	—	6	9	3	—
Everblack	Released: June 11, 2013; Label: Metal Blade; Format: CD, digital download, vinyl	32	—	9	13	3	91
Abysmal	Released: September 18, 2015; Label: Metal Blade; Format: CD, digital download, vinyl	45	—	12	15	8	66
Nightbringers	Released: October 6, 2017; Label: Metal Blade; Format: CD, digital download, vinyl	35	—	3	6	3	47
Verminous	Released: April 17, 2020; Label: Metal Blade; Format: CD, digital download, vinyl	99	—	—	—	—	7
Servitude	Released: September 27, 2024; Label: Metal Blade; Format: CD, digital download, vinyl	—	—	—	—	—	55
"—" denotes a recording that did not chart or was not released in that territory.

=== Demos and EPs ===
- What a Horrible Night to Have a Curse (demo, May 2001)
- A Cold-Blooded Epitaph (EP, May 2002)
- Buy Us a Van (demo, 2002)
- Grind 'Em All (cover EP, November 28, 2014)

=== Music videos ===
Year	Song	Director
2003	"Funeral Thirst"	Jason Joseph
2003	"Contagion"	Jason Arambulo
2006	"A Vulgar Picture"	Matt Bass
2006	"Miasma"	Joe Lynch
2006	"Statutory Ape"	Doug Spangenberg
2007	"Everything Went Black"	Dave Brodsky
2007	"What a Horrible Night to Have a Curse"	Robbie Tasaro
2009	"Necropolis"	Robbie Tasaro
2011	"Moonlight Equilibrium"	Dave Brodsky
2013	"Goat of Departure"	Ben Mayer
2014	"In Hell Is Where She Waits for Me (Live)"	Robbie Tasaro
2015	"Receipt"	Robert Graves
2016	"Threat Level No. 3"	Adam Avilla
2017	"Nightbringers"	Vince Edwards
2018	"Kings of the Night World"	Marshall Wieczorek
2020	"Child of Night"	Vesa Ranta & Kaira Films
2020	"Removal of Oaken Stake"	Vesa Ranta & Kaira Films
2024	"Panic Hysteric"	Robbie Tasaro
2024	"Aftermath"	Dave Brodsky
2024	"Mammoth's Hand"	Marco Pavone
2024	"Utopia Black"	Robbie Tasaro

=== DVDs ===
- Majesty (May 12, 2009)
- Fool 'Em All (May 27, 2014)

== Awards and nominations ==
Metal Hammer Golden Gods Awards
Year	Nominee / work	Award	Result
2008	The Black Dahlia Murder	Best Underground Act	Won
2014	Ryan Knight	Best Shredder	Nominated
