= The Eternal Return (album) =

- External slipcase cover.

Studio album by Darkest Hour
- Released: 23rd June, 2009
- Recorded: March 9–April 9, 2009 at Salad Days Studio
- Genre: Melodic death metal, metalcore
- Length: 34:53
- Label: Victory
- Producer: Brian McTernan

Darkest Hour chronology
Deliver Us (2007)	The Eternal Return (2009)	The Human Romance (2011)

The Eternal Return is the sixth studio album by American melodic death metal band Darkest Hour released on June 23, 2009 through Victory Records. The album was produced by Brian McTernan (Senses Fail, Thrice, From Autumn To Ashes) who had previously produced Darkest Hour's debut album The Mark of the Judas in 2000. The album fulfilled the band's contract with Victory, making it their last release through the label.

== Background ==
In September 2008, prior to the recording of The Eternal Return, Darkest Hour parted ways with lead guitarist Kris Norris, making this the first album since 2001's So Sedated, So Secure to not feature Norris. He was temporarily replaced by former At All Cost guitarist Mike Carrigan, who was later made a permanent member of the band after filling in for Norris during the 2008 "Thrash and Burn" tour. After departing from the band, Norris began working on a solo album with a new band under the name "The Kris Norris Projekt", began pursuing his career as a music producer and later filled in for God Forbid's rhythm guitarist Dallas Coyle during their 2009 tours.

The Eternal Return was produced by Brian McTernan at Salad Days Studio in Baltimore, Maryland. Darkest Hour had previously worked with McTernan on their 2000 debut album The Mark of the Judas, and had been a long-time supporter of the band since its formation in 1995. According to Darkest Hour lead guitarist and founding member Mike Schleibaum, Brian McTernan "helped solidify our sound and define us as a band. Eight years later, it's time to do it again. With all the scars of our past to guide us, we look towards a new future."

During the Thrash and Burn European Tour 2009, Darkest Hour played "No God", the first song from The Eternal Return to be performed live prior to its release. The song was later temporarily made available for free as part of a Victory Records Memorial Day Metal Sampler, one month before the release of the album. To coincide with the start of the 2009 Summer Slaughter Tour, Darkest Hour posted "Devolution of the Flesh" on their MySpace page on June 5, 2009.

Darkest Hour and Victory Records also set up a contest for the release of The Eternal Return dubbed "The Eternal Giveaway". Each first pressing physical copy of the album contained a Victory Metal bonus insert with a unique code. For one week, starting June 23, 2009, the day of release, fans could enter their code into the Eternal Giveaway website to instantly win one of 50 prizes. Some of the prizes included clothing, musical equipment and instruments, tickets and backstage passes to Darkest Hour shows and a chance for Darkest Hour to play at the winner's house party. The Victory Metal insert also acted as a coupon for Darkest Hour merchandise.

The Eternal Return sold 4,700 copies in its first week of release, allowing the album to peak at 104 on the Billboard 200.

== Sound and theme ==
The band hoped to make The Eternal Return an aggressive metal album with "no hidden agenda, no pop hit, or stylistic departure to broaden the fan base." Schleibaum described the album as having the "aggression and speed" of 2003's Hidden Hands of a Sadist Nation, the "melody and songwriting" of 2005's Undoing Ruin, and the "technicality and musicianship" of 2007's Deliver Us.

In an interview with HardcoreSounds Darkest Hour explained the concept behind the record and the title, The Eternal Return. Vocalist John Henry described the concept as both "a death and a rebirth" for the band. He felt that the band had "come full circle" as this album returns to Darkest Hour's more aggressive roots and also features their former producer, Brian McTernan. Henry also saw the album as a rebirth of the band with the addition of a new guitarist, Mike Carrigan, and the end of Darkest Hour's contract with Victory Records. Guitarist Mike Schleibaum added that the title also described how the album compiled the sound from every Darkest Hour record. Schleibaum went on to say that this album was a return to what the members liked about the band. In an interview with Baltimore's 98 Rock, Schleibaum described the album as more "pissed off" and "badass." He commented on Darkest Hour's previous recording sessions where the band had tried to push the direction of their sound to be more "melodic" and "proggier," but with The Eternal Return they wanted to make a more aggressive and "energetic" record.

Darkest Hour had conceived the idea of making a more aggressive album during the 2007 Deliver Us sessions. The last song on every Darkest Hour record, in the past, has always been an indication of what the style of the following album would be. The title and final track of Deliver Us was the "heaviest, fastest song" on that album.

== Reception ==
Professional ratings
Review scores
Source	Rating
Allmusic	4/5 stars
Alternative Press	4/5 stars
Blabbermouth.net	8/10 stars
Sputnikmusic	3.5/5 stars
Ultimate Guitar	(8.2/10)

Allmusic gave the album four stars, calling it a "very solid metalcore/melodic death metal album" and that "Just about every other song here, though, features a hooky riff and a memorable -- if not "catchy" in the traditional pop chart sense—chorus". Blabbermouth.net was favourable, stating "The album has a sense of urgency about it that belies the band's veteran status and the energy level remains high because of it". Ultimate Guitar said "The Eternal Return, is their strongest, heaviest, and most innovative release to date", with a rating of (8.2/10). Staff reviewer for Sputnikmusic Channing Freeman was less favourable, commenting "While Darkest Hour didn't change much on The Eternal Return, it's still a great metal album that is catchy and fun while still being dark" giving the album three and a half out of five stars.

== Track listing ==
All songs written by Darkest Hour.

No.	Title	Length
1.	"Devolution of the Flesh"	2:46
2.	"Death Worship"	3:10
3.	"The Tides"	4:19
4.	"No God"	4:47
5.	"Bitter"	1:19
6.	"Blessed Infection"	3:25
7.	"Transcendence"	4:20
8.	"A Distorted Utopia"	2:57
9.	"Black Sun"	3:16
10.	"Into the Grey"	4:34
Total length:		34:53

== Personnel ==
Darkest Hour

- John Henry – vocals
- Mike "Lonestar" Carrigan – lead guitar
- Mike Schleibaum – rhythm guitar
- Paul Burnette – bass
- Ryan Parrish – drums

Production

- Produced and mixed by Brian McTernan
- Additional engineering and tape op by Kory Gabel
- Pro Tools engineering by Pete Duvall

Art

- Original artwork by Lloyd Winter
- Photos by Pete Duvall
- Layout and design by Sons of Nero

== Chart performance ==
Chart (2009)	Chart peak
US Billboard 200	104
US Top Heatseekers	1
US Top Independent Albums	16
