= Sickness and Misery =

Compilation album by God Forbid
- Released: November 6, 2007
- Genre: Metalcore
- Length: 54:46
- Label: KOCH Records

God Forbid chronology
IV: Constitution of Treason (2005)	Sickness and Misery (2007)

Sickness and Misery is an album by God Forbid. It is a combination of their first album, Reject the Sickness, and their first EP, Out of Misery.

== Track listing ==
All tracks are written by God Forbid.

No.	Title	Length
1.	"Amendment"	3:02
2.	"Reject the Sickness"	3:27
3.	"N2"	3:21
4.	"No Sympathy"	2:36
5.	"Assed Out"	3:57
6.	"Ashes of Humanity (Regret)"	3:51
7.	"Dark Waters"	2:13
8.	"Heartless"	3:42
9.	"Weather the Storm"	3:58
10.	"The Century Fades"	1:20
11.	"Mind Eraser"	1:58
12.	"Habeeber"	4:04
13.	"Madman"	4:26
14.	"Nosferatu"	5:45
15.	"Inside"	3:55
16.	"N2" (Demo)	3:11
Total length:		54:46

== Personnel ==
- Byron Davis – lead vocals
- Doc Coyle – lead guitar
- Dallas Coyle – rhythm guitar
- John "Beeker" Outcalt – bass guitar
- Corey Pierce – drums
