= Archives (Darkest Hour album) =

Compilation album by Darkest Hour
- Released: October 3, 2006
- Recorded: May 1996 – 1999
- Genre: Metalcore; sludge metal
- Length: 67:30
- Label: A-F
- Producer: Darkest Hour; Ken Olden; Brian McTernan; Howard Pyle

Darkest Hour chronology
Undoing Ruin (2005)	Archives (2006)	Deliver Us (2007)

Professional ratings
Review scores
Source	Rating
Allmusic	3/5 stars
Punknews.org	3.5/5 stars

Archives is a compilation album by Darkest Hour, released on October 3, 2006 through A-F Records.

The disc includes tracks from the band's first two independent EPs, 1996's The Misanthrope and 1999's The Prophecy Fulfilled. The audio for this release was re-mastered from the original master tapes.

Tracks 1 to 6 are from The Prophecy Fulfilled, track 10 and is from a split EP with Groundzero, and tracks 11 to 16 are from The Misanthrope. Tracks 7 to 9 are alternate versions of songs from The Prophecy Fulfilled.

== Track listing ==
No.	Title	Length
1.	"The Choir of the Prophecy Fulfilled"	5:18
2.	"Reflections of Ruin"	3:49
3.	"Broken Wings, Pt. 1"	3:22
4.	"This Side of the Nightmare"	4:09
5.	"This Curse"	6:45
6.	"Coda XIII" (Instrumental)	5:03
7.	"This Side of the Nightmare" (Alternate Version)	3:30
8.	"Reflections of Ruin" (Alternate Version)	3:51
9.	"This Curse" (Alternate Version)	6:23
10.	"Faith Like Suicide"	6:19
11.	"Vise"	5:28
12.	"Looking Forward (To the End)"	3:42
13.	"The Misanthrope"	4:14
14.	"Fathom"	5:34
15.	"Keepsake 23"	6:15
16.	"Crossroads"	3:48

== Personnel ==
- John Henry – vocals
- Mike Schleibaum – guitars
- Fred Ziomek – lead guitar (tracks 9 and 10)
- Billups Allen – bass (tracks 1 to 10)
- Raul Mayorga – bass (tracks 11 to 16)
- Matt Mabben – drums (tracks 1 to 8, 10 to 16)
- Ryan Parrish – drums (track 9)
