= Godless Prophets & the Migrant Flora =

Studio album by Darkest Hour
- Released: March 10, 2017
- Recorded: September – October 2016
- Studio: Godcity Studio, Salem, Massachusetts
- Genre: Melodic death metal, metalcore
- Length: 44:48
- Label: Southern Lord
- Producer: Kurt Ballou; Darkest Hour

Darkest Hour chronology
Darkest Hour (2014)	Godless Prophets & the Migrant Flora (2017)	Perpetual I Terminal (2024)

Professional ratings
Aggregate scores
Source	Rating
Metacritic	74/100
Review scores
Source	Rating
Exclaim!	8/10
MetalSucks	5/5 stars
PopMatters	6/10 stars
Revolver	4/5 stars
Sputnikmusic	3.6/5

Godless Prophets & the Migrant Flora is the ninth studio album by the American heavy metal band Darkest Hour. It was released worldwide on March 10, 2017, through Southern Lord Records. The album features guest guitarist Kris Norris who previously played with the band from 2001 to 2008, contributing with some additional guitar work. Early preorders of the album were bundled with their first full-length live DVD recorded in 2015 for the 10th anniversary of Undoing Ruin. This was limited to 1,100 copies. The band made a digital version of the album available to fans who contributed to their Indiegogo campaign on February 17, 2017. The album was the last to feature longtime lead guitarist Mike "Lonestar" Carrigan, who departed the band in July 2020.

== Track listing ==
No.	Title	Length
1.	"Knife in the Safe Room"	2:49
2.	"This Is the Truth"	3:50
3.	"Timeless Numbers"	3:59
4.	"None of This Is the Truth"	3:24
5.	"The Flesh & the Flowers of Death"	4:30
6.	"Those Who Survived"	3:57
7.	"Another Headless Ruler of the Used"	3:02
8.	"Widowed"	1:29
9.	"Enter Oblivion"	4:01
10.	"The Last of the Monuments"	4:59
11.	"In the Name of Us All"	3:34
12.	"Beneath It Sleeps"	5:14
Total length:		44:48

== Personnel ==
Darkest Hour

- John Henry – vocals
- Mike "Lonestar" Carrigan – lead guitar
- Mike Schleibaum – rhythm guitar
- Aaron Deal – bass
- Travis Orbin – drums

Additional personnel

- Kurt Ballou – production
- Kris Norris – guitar solo on "Beneath It Sleeps"
- John Connolly – guitar solo on "Timeless Numbers"
- Shaun Beaudry – album cover

== Chart performance ==
Chart (2017)	Chart peak
US Top Heatseekers	1
US Top Independent Albums	8
US Top Hard Rock Albums	11
US Top Rock Albums	46
US Top Album Sales	48
US Top Vinyl Albums	9
