= An Epitaph =

An Epitaph may refer to:

- "An Epitaph", classical song by Ivor Gurney
- "An Epitaph" (Darkest Hour song)
- An Epitaph (album), live album by Antimatter
- "An Epitaph" (circa 1910-1920), a poem by William Blake
- An Epitaph for George Dillon
