= Determination (disambiguation) =

Determination is a positive feeling that involves persevering towards a difficult goal.

Determination may also refer to:

- Determination (God Forbid album), 2001
- Determination (Tommy Emmanuel album), 1992
- Determinations, a Japanese reggae and ska band
- "Determination", a track by Toby Fox from the Undertale Soundtrack
- Determination (biology), matching part of an organism to a taxon
- Determination (film), 1922 American film

== See also ==
- Self-determination (disambiguation)
