= Straight Line Stitch =

American metalcore band

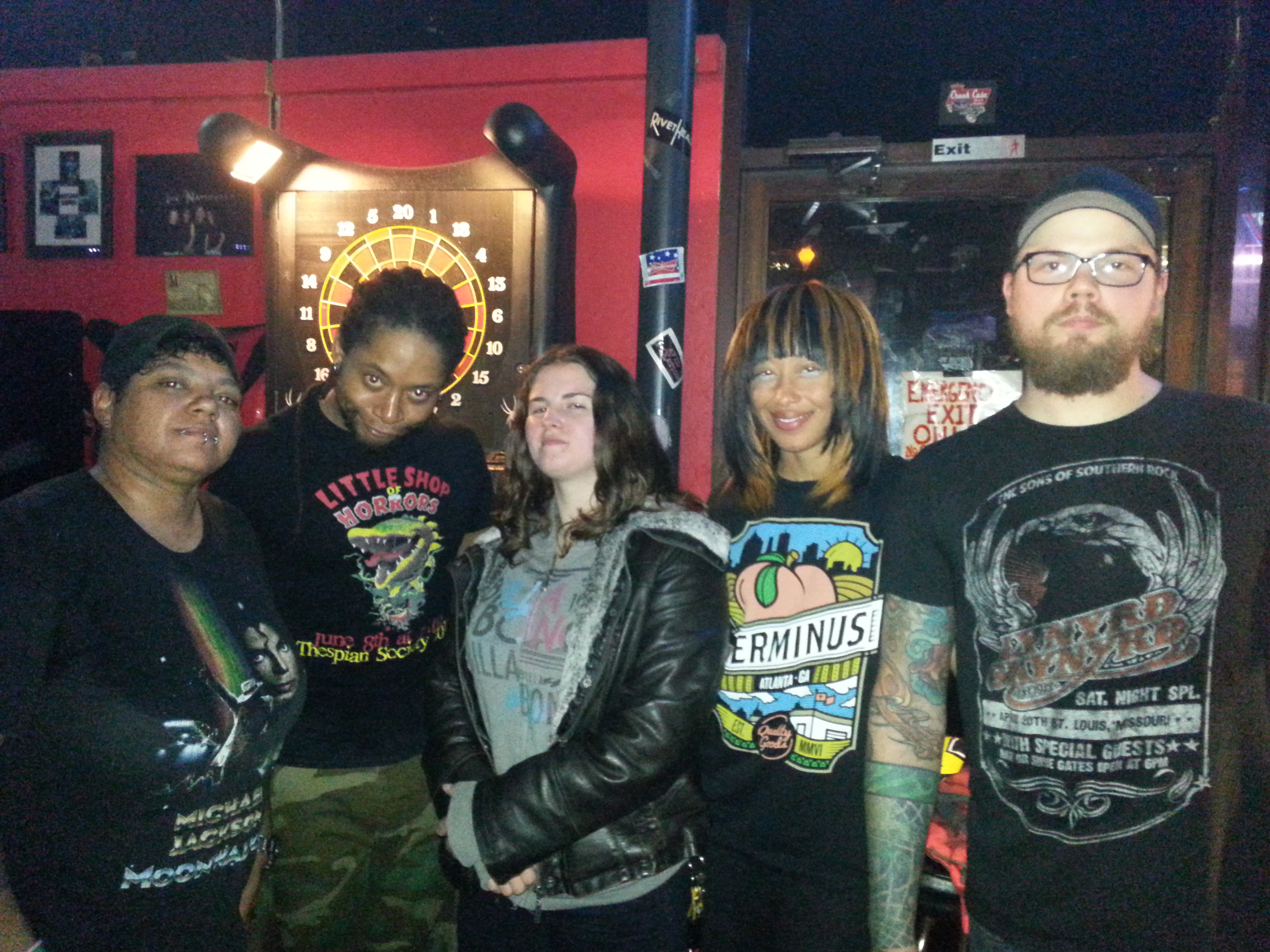
- Straight Line Stitch in 2014

Background information
- Origin: Knoxville, Tennessee, U.S.
- Genres: Metalcore
- Years active: 2000–2015; 2021–present
- Labels: Koch; E1; Pavement
- Members: Alexis Brown; Jason White; Darren McClelland; Patrick Gleeson; Scott Haynes
- Website: www.facebook.com/straightlinestitch

Straight Line Stitch is an American metalcore band from Knoxville, Tennessee.

== History ==
Straight Line Stitch initially was formed by Patrick Haynes and Seth Thacker in 1999 and issued an EP and a demo album before adding vocalist Alexis Brown from Clarksville, Tennessee to the band in 2003. Brown sang on their self-released 2006 effort To Be Godlike and then on an EP entitled The Word Made Flesh for which they filmed a video for the single "Remission". The video's director, Dale Resteghini, owned the production company Raging Nation Films; in 2007 he formed a subsidiary label of Koch Records called Raging Nation Records, and Straight Line Stitch became the label's first signing. Their first nationally distributed album, When Skies Wash Ashore, appeared on the imprint in 2008, with another album, The Fight of Our Lives, arriving in 2011. The Fight of Our Lives reached No. 5 on the Billboard Heatseekers chart and No. 34 on the Top Independent Albums chart. On July 26, 2014, during The Dog Days Of Summer Tour, Straight Line Stitch released their self-titled EP, while announcing they are still working on an album. In 2016, Brown gave birth to a baby with guitarist Jason White.

== Band members ==
=== Current ===
- Alexis Brown – vocals (2003–present)
- Jason White – guitars (2013–present), bass (2007–2013)
- Darren McClelland – bass (2013–present)
- Patrick Gleeson – guitars (2015–present)
- Scott Haynes – drums (2015–present)

=== Former ===
- Patrick Gleeson – guitars
- Justin Kelly – guitars
- Ian Shuirr – drums
- Kris Hawkins – guitars
- Nathan Palmer – guitars
- Edison Vidro – bass
- Tim Chappell – guitars
- Pat Pattison – guitars
- Patrick Haynes – drums, guitars
- Jason Pedigo – bass
- Carl Purple – bass
- Tasha Sparklefarts – keyboards
- Ron Dorski – samples
- Walt Baughman – organ
- Tim Saults – guitars
- James Davila – vocals
- Ryan McBroom – guitars
- Kevin Smith – vocals
- Adam Fontana – bass
- Kanky Lora – drums
- Kris Norris – guitars
- Seth Thacker – guitars
- Mark Kennedy – bass
- Andrew Mikhail – guitars
- Joey Nichols – drums
- Jackie Bergjans – guitars (2012–2015)
- Ryan Bennett – guitars (2015 touring only)

== Discography ==
=== Studio albums ===
- Everything is Nothing By Itself (2004)
- To Be Godlike (2006)
- When Skies Wash Ashore (Koch Records, 2008)
- The Fight of Our Lives (E1 Music, 2011)

=== Extended plays ===
- The Barker (2001)
- Jagermeister (2003)
- The Word Made Flesh (2007)
- Straight Line Stitch (2014)
- Transparency (Pavement Entertainment, 2015)

=== Singles ===
Single	Year	Album
"Remission"	2007	The Word Made Flesh EP
"Black Veil"	2008	When Skies Wash Ashore
"What You Do To Me"	2009	When Skies Wash Ashore
"Taste of Ashes"	2009	When Skies Wash Ashore
"Never See The Day"	2010	When Skies Wash Ashore
"Conversion"	2011	The Fight of Our Lives
"One Reason"	2011	The Fight of Our Lives
"Human Bondage"	2015	Transparency EP
