= Better Days (EP) =

EP by God Forbid
- Released: December 9, 2003
- Genre: Metalcore
- Length: 15:36
- Label: Century Media
- Producer: God Forbid

God Forbid chronology
| Determination (2001) | Better Days (2003) | Gone Forever (2004) |

Better Days, released on December 9, 2003, is the second EP by the New Jersey heavy metal quintet God Forbid.

== Track listing ==
All tracks are written by God Forbid.

| No. | Title | Length |
|---|---|---|
| 1. | "Better Days" | 3:53 |
| 2. | "Allegiance" | 3:59 |
| 3. | "Wicked" (Demo) | 3:52 |
| 4. | "Reject the Sickness" | 3:27 |
| 5. | "Mind Eraser" | 1:45 |
| Total length: | | 15:36 |

== Personnel ==
- Byron Davis – lead vocals
- Doc Coyle – lead guitar, clean vocals
- Dallas Coyle – rhythm guitar
- John "Beeker" Outcalt – bass guitar
- Corey Pierce – drums
