= Darkest Hour (album) =

Studio album by Darkest Hour
- Released: August 5, 2014
- Recorded: 2013 Oceanic Studios
- Genre: Melodic metalcore
- Length: 49:29
- Label: Sumerian
- Producer: Taylor Larson

Darkest Hour chronology
The Human Romance (2011)	Darkest Hour (2014)	Godless Prophets & the Migrant Flora (2017)

Professional ratings
Review scores
Source	Rating
AllMusic	3/5 stars
Alternative Press	4/5 stars

Darkest Hour is the eighth studio album by the American heavy metal band Darkest Hour. It was released on August 5, 2014, through Sumerian Records. It is the first album to feature bassist Aaron Deal and drummer Travis Orbin. The album marks their significant departure from their usual melodic death metal sound, instead having a more mainstream approach with elements of metalcore more prominent, with a more upbeat style and many clean vocals placed throughout. This style has only been utilised on this release to date however, as with the band's next release, Godless Prophets & the Migrant Flora, would see a return to their original style.

== Track listing ==
No.	Title	Length
1.	"Wasteland"	4:13
2.	"Rapture in Exile"	2:11
3.	"The Misery We Make"	3:06
4.	"Infinite Eyes"	3:40
5.	"Futurist"	3:59
6.	"The Great Oppressor"	3:33
7.	"Anti-Axis"	3:29
8.	"By the Starlight"	4:07
9.	"Lost for Life"	2:52
10.	"The Goddess Figure"	4:14
11.	"Beneath The Blackening Sky"	3:53
12.	"Hypatia Rising"	5:45
13.	"Departure"	4:27

=== Digital Deluxe Edition track listing ===
No.	Title	Length
1.	"Wasteland"	4:13
2.	"Rapture in Exile"	2:11
3.	"The Misery We Make"	3:06
4.	"Infinite Eyes"	3:40
5.	"Futurist"	3:59
6.	"The Great Oppressor"	3:33
7.	"Anti-Axis"	3:29
8.	"By the Starlight"	4:07
9.	"Lost for Life"	2:52
10.	"The Goddess Figure"	4:14
11.	"Lunar Divide"	3:16
12.	"Beneath the Blackening Sky"	3:53
13.	"Surrealist"	3:06
14.	"Hypatia Rising"	5:45
15.	"Departure"	4:27

== Personnel ==
Darkest Hour

- John Henry – vocals
- Mike "Lonestar" Carrigan – lead guitar
- Mike Schleibaum – rhythm guitar
- Aaron Deal – bass
- Travis Orbin – drums, percussion

Additional personnel

- Dræmings – additional vocals on "By the Starlight"
- Anton Patzner – string arrangement on "Departure"
- John Connolly – additional guitars, consultation
- Taylor Larson – mastering, mixing, production
- Ernie Slenkovich – engineering, tracking, editing
