= The Human Romance =

Studio album by Darkest Hour
- Released: February 22, 2011
- Genre: Melodic death metal
- Length: 45:44
- Label: eOne
- Producer: Peter Wichers

Darkest Hour chronology
The Eternal Return (2009)	The Human Romance (2011)	Darkest Hour (2014)

Professional ratings
Aggregate scores
Source	Rating
Metacritic	74/100
Review scores
Source	Rating
AllMusic	4/5 stars
Rock Sound	8/10

The Human Romance is the seventh studio album by the American melodic death metal band Darkest Hour. The album was released on February 22, 2011, in North America through eOne Music, and was released on March 7 in Europe through Century Media Records. This would be Darkest Hour's last album with drummer Ryan Parrish and bassist Paul Burnette.

The cover art is the Lovers of Valdaro photograph.

== Production ==
The Human Romance was recorded at a North Carolina studio with producer (and Soilwork guitarist) Peter Wichers. Wichers previously helmed such acclaimed albums as All That Remains's The Fall of Ideals and Soilwork's latest effort, The Panic Broadcast. This time around, the Darkest Hour songs were composed a bit differently than was the case in the past. Guitarist Mike Schleibaum explains, "We have been working on these tunes ever since we left the studio last April. 'The Eternal Return' was written during a very dark, bleak time for the band and I think that record matches that in both tone and character. Our vision was for it to be an in-your-face, no-frills aggressive assault. The new material shares in that aggression and pushes Darkest Hour beyond the unknown."

== Promotion and release ==
To promote the album, several songs were available for previewing online prior to the release of The Human Romance. These included the release of "Savor the Kill" in January, and "Your Everyday Disaster" and "Love as a Weapon" in February 2011. The entire album became available for streaming on the band's Myspace page on February 15, 2011.

== Track listing ==
No.	Title	Length
1.	"Terra Nocturnus"	1:16
2.	"The World Engulfed in Flames"	3:52
3.	"Savor the Kill"	3:48
4.	"Man & Swine"	3:44
5.	"Love as a Weapon"	4:00
6.	"Your Everyday Disaster"	2:48
7.	"Violent by Nature"	2:21
8.	"Purgatory"	3:48
9.	"Severed into Separates"	3:29
10.	"Wound"	3:45
11.	"Terra Solaris"	8:41
12.	"Beyond the Life You Know"	4:12
Total length:		45:41

Digital edition bonus track
No.	Title	Length
13.	"Hierarchy Of Heathens"	4:52
Total length:		50:33

== Personnel ==
The Human Romance album personnel as adapted from Allmusic.,

Darkest Hour

- John Henry – vocals
- Mike "Lonestar" Carrigan – lead guitar
- Mike Schleibaum – rhythm guitar
- Paul Burnette – bass
- Ryan Parrish – drums

Additional musicians

- Tosin Abasi (Animals as Leaders) – guitar solo on Terra Solaris
- Chris Carmichael – strings
- Kristen Randall (ex-Winds of Plague) – piano

Recording and production

- Ryan Smith – mastering
- Paul Leavitt – mixing
- Mike McAree – engineer
- Brian McTernan – mixing
- Mike Schleibaum – engineer
- Peter Wichers – producer

Artwork

- Paul Grosso – creative director
- Andrew Kelley – art direction, design
- Tom Medvedich – photography
