= Darkest Hour (band) =

American metal band

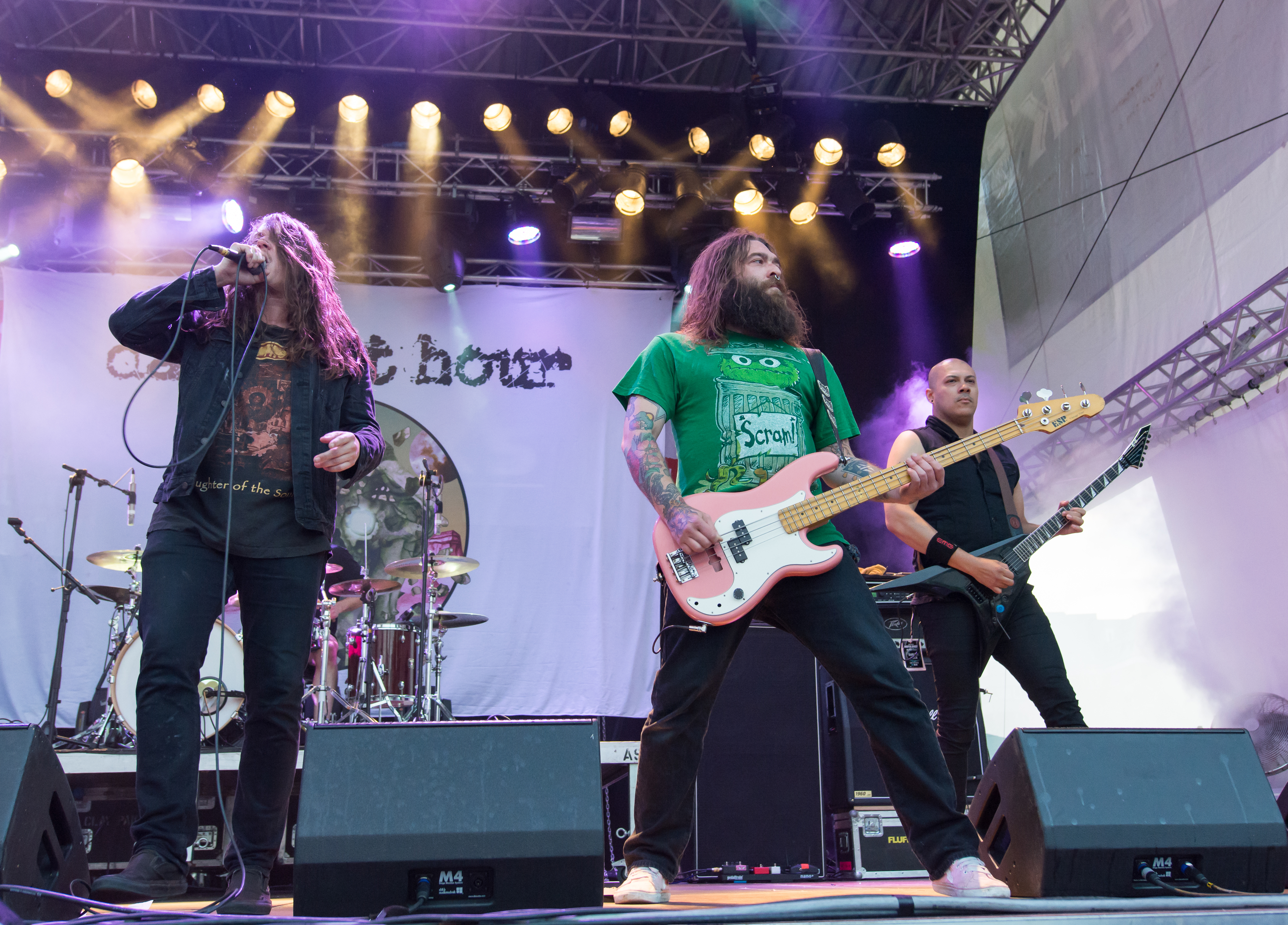
- Darkest Hour performing in 2017

Background information
- Origin: Washington, D.C., U.S.
- Genres: Melodic death metal; metalcore
- Years active: 1995–present
- Labels: Southern Lord; Sumerian; eOne; Victory
- Members: John Henry; Mike Schleibaum; Aaron Deal; Travis Orbin; Nico Santora
- Past members: Raul Mayorga; Matt Maben; Ryan Parrish; Fred Ziomek; Billups Allen; Paul Burnette; Mike "Lonestar" Carrigan; Kris Norris; Timothy Java
- Website: officialdarkesthour.com

Darkest Hour is an American heavy metal band from Washington, D.C., formed in 1995. Though failing to break through early in their tenure, the band has received acclaim for their albums Undoing Ruin, Deliver Us, and The Eternal Return. Deliver Us debuted at number 110 on the Billboard album charts, with sales of 6,600, and their more recent effort, The Eternal Return, reached a higher position in the Billboard album charts at number 104. Their album Godless Prophets & the Migrant Flora charted at 42 on the Billboard 200, a peak for the band, and it marked a stylistic shift in the band's discography.

== History ==
=== Formation (1995–1999) ===
Darkest Hour played their first show on September 23, 1995, and initially consisted of vocalist John Henry, guitarist Mike Schleibaum, drummer Matt Maben, and bassist Raul Mayorga.

The band released its first EP, The Misanthrope, in 1996 on the local label Death Truck Records. In 1996, Darkest Hour cut the single "Paths of Despair" for East Coast Empire Records' The Harder They Come compilation. The song has a slower, grueling tempo in comparison to the up-beat tempo the band would become known for. In 1999, Darkest Hour released another EP, The Prophecy Fulfilled, on the Art Monk Construction label.

=== The Mark of the Judas and So Sedated, So Secure (2000–2002) ===
With the addition of lead guitarist Fred Ziomek, bassist Billups Allen and drummer Ryan Parrish, the band released their first full-length LP, The Mark of the Judas, in 2000, on the now-defunct M.I.A. Records.

The Mark of the Judas was not widely promoted or distributed due to M.I.A. Records going out of business not long after the album's release.

Victory Records picked up Darkest Hour. Their label debut, So Sedated, So Secure, was released on August 7, 2001. Billups was replaced with Paul Burnette and Ziomek left the band. Victory reissued the album on March 7, 2006, with new artwork, remixed audio, rerecorded vocals and bonus tracks.

The band continued to tour, with Mike Garrity filling in on lead guitar. They accepted Kris Norris as the new lead guitarist and began to write their next record.

While Garrity was the guitarist, the band was arrested and jailed in Roland, Oklahoma for alleged marijuana charges, also for "illegally imported" beer and for an open beer can. They were fined $6000. Schleibaum paid for himself, while Burnette, and Garrity. Parrish and Henry had to stay for a couple of hours while the rest of the band bailed them out.

=== Hidden Hands of a Sadist Nation and Undoing Ruin (2003–2006) ===
Their third release, Hidden Hands of a Sadist Nation, was released on May 20, 2003. Produced by Swedish record producer Fredrik Nordström, the album signaled a shift from the band's metalcore to a melodic death metal style. As a result, the album gained mainstream attention, allowing the band to perform at Ozzfest 2004. The album contained political lyrics, with several songs criticizing American militarism post-September 11. Victory reissued the album on July 13, 2004, with a bonus song and an additional DVD containing bonus material.

Darkest Hour released their fourth full-length LP, Undoing Ruin, on June 28, 2005. The album was produced by Devin Townsend (Strapping Young Lad) at Greenhouse Studios in Vancouver. The album was the band's first to enter the Billboard 200 charts, debuting at No. 138 with first week sales of 8,484.

In the 2005 documentary Metal: A Headbanger's Journey, Darkest Hour and a number of other bands including Shadows Fall, Lamb of God, Chimaira, Killswitch Engage, Unearth, and God Forbid are listed under the category "New Wave of American Metal" in the "metal genealogy chart".

=== Deliver Us (2007–2008) ===
In early 2007, the band was in Vancouver to work on their next record with Townsend. On March 7, 2007, Victory Records issued a press statement confirming the title of the album was Deliver Us; it was released on July 10.

In April 2008, Darkest Hour created a Washington Capitals fight song and a MySpace tribute page in support of the Capitals 2008 Stanley Cup playoffs run. The song "A Thousand Words to Say but One" was re-recorded with new lyrics and new solos into "Let's Go Caps!"

In September 2008, it was reported on Blabbermouth.net that Kris Norris had left the band and would be pursuing producing routes and possibly a new band. Not long after Norris' departure, they found replacement Mike "Lonestar" Carrigan. With Carrigan officially on board, the band headed back into the studio to write & record with producer Brian McTernan of Baltimore's Salad Days Studio.

The band's song "Demon(s)" is featured on the music game Guitar Hero 5.

=== The Eternal Return (2009−2010) ===
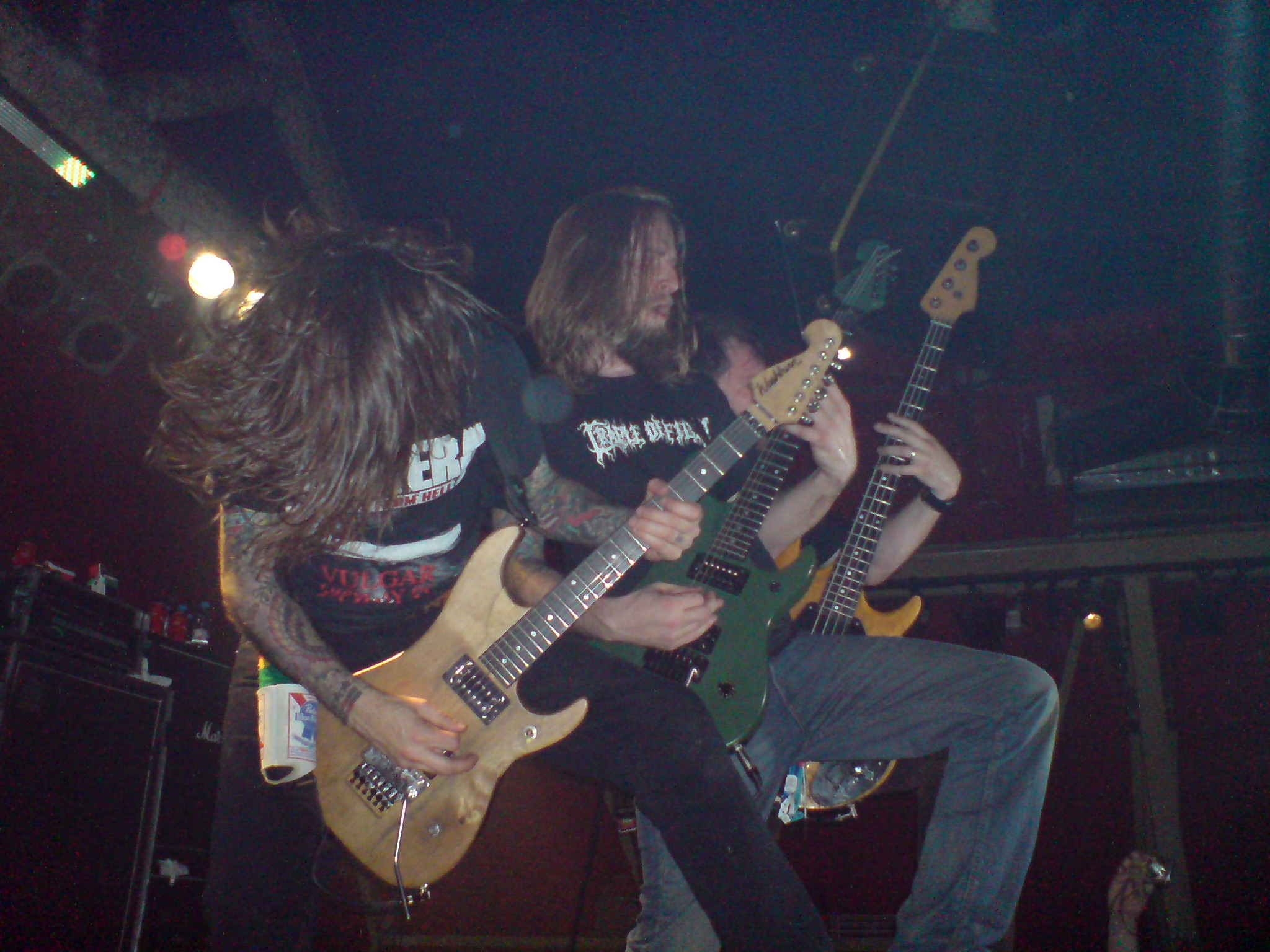
Darkest Hour live in Barcelona in 2009. From left to right: Mike Schleibaum, Mike Carrigan and Paul Burnette.

In March 2009, Darkest Hour began to record the new album, The Eternal Return, just before co-headlining (along with Bleeding Through) the Thrash and Burn European Tour 2009 in April and May. The Eternal Return was released on June 23, 2009, two weeks later than originally announced. Darkest Hour then went on to play the 2009 Summer Slaughter Tour. They supported Trivium for the first leg of the North American into the Mouth of Hell We March Tour.

In February 2010, Darkest Hour announced a new tour with Dillinger Escape Plan, Iwrestledabearonce, and Animals as Leaders.

=== Signing to eOne and The Human Romance (2010–2012) ===
In April 2010, Darkest Hour announced their signing to eOne Music after having been with Victory Records for a decade. The new album will be produced by Soilwork guitarist Peter Wichers, who helped pioneer Swedish melodic death metal and was a major influence on Darkest Hour. In an August press release, the band described the new material as "the most emotional and melodic Darkest Hour album to date" and also said it "shares in that aggression with The Eternal Return and pushes Darkest Hour beyond the unknown."

In a new Metal Injection interview, Darkest Hour members Mike Schleibaum and Ryan Parrish revealed that the new record would be titled The Human Romance, and it was officially released on February 22, 2011.

On January 13, 2011, A new song entitled "Savor the Kill" was released onto Noisecreep.

On December 22, 2011, Darkest Hour announced that they have parted ways with longtime drummer Ryan Parrish. He was replaced by Timothy Java from Dead To Fall.

On June 6, 2012, Darkest Hour announced that bassist Paul Burnette would be amicably leaving the band to join Iron Reagan. Aaron Deal, who had toured with Darkest Hour in Asia, Australia, Europe, and North America was also announced as the new bassist.

=== Signing to Sumerian Records and self-titled album (2013–2015) ===
On February 5, 2013, the band posted on Facebook that they are currently in the pre-production phase for the new record.

On April 16, 2013, the band announced that Travis Orbin, a seasoned touring musician and session drummer, would be joining the band and has been a part of the writing process of the untitled 8th studio album. On June 14, the band announced they had signed with Sumerian Records and implicated that they will be re-releasing The Mark of the Judas in late 2013, as well as working on a new record.

Darkest Hour released their self-titled eighth studio album on August 5, 2014.

They played numerous special shows in various parts of the world in 2015 where they played Undoing Ruin in its entirety along with other fan favorite tracks, to celebrate the tenth anniversary of its release in 2005.

=== Godless Prophets & the Migrant Flora and Perpetual Terminal (2016–present) ===
No longer contractually obligated with any record label, in early 2016 Darkest Hour launched an IndieGoGo crowdfunding campaign to help pay for their upcoming ninth studio album as well as their first ever full-length live DVD, Live at the Black Cat 2015, which was a special show where they celebrated the tenth anniversary of Undoing Ruin. By March 14, 2016, the band had surpassed their US$50,000 goal by raising $67,707 from more than 1,200 fans. In their announcement of exceeding their goal, Darkest Hour said they could use the extra money earned to "enhance the artwork, produce a music video (or two), enlist a possible guest musician (or two), hire a world class producer, and lastly help fund enhanced coverage of the making of / behind the scenes action."

The band recorded their ninth album at GodCity Studio with Kurt Ballou of Converge fame from September–October 2016. Commenting on the choice of producer, Schleibaum said, "We want bring the energetic, raw, emotion we exude live to tape this time. We love to jam and riff all day and we feel Kurt [Ballou]'s unique style of producing will complement this perfectly. Also, it doesn't hurt that we completely respect and trust him as both a friend and musician, meaning we feel this monumental task of bringing another Darkest Hour album to life will rest well in his hands." While in the studio, the band announced they were aiming for a February 2017 release date and would be collaborating with former member Kris Norris on a few tracks. On working with his former band members, Norris commented: "When the guys contacted me about the idea of a collaboration, I was excited because it has been a really long time since I've worked with them all. I've stayed in touch with them over the past years and it's really awesome to see that they keep trying new things on every album and growing musically."

Darkest Hour released their ninth studio album titled Godless Prophets & the Migrant Flora on March 10, 2017. Originally wanting to entirely self-fund and self-release the album, the band partnered with Southern Lord Records—who released the vinyl edition of their debut The Mark of the Judas in 2000—to complete the album's production and assist with distribution and marketing. Supporting tours began with a February–March 2017 US Tour with crossover thrash band Ringworm, Finnish grindcore band Rotten Sound, sludge metal band Tombs and Rivers of Nihil.

On July 28, 2020, Darkest Hour announced that Mike "Lonestar" Carrigan had departed from the band and that "the next chapter starts now".

On September 21, 2021, Darkest Hour announced that Nico Santora (formerly of Fallujah, Suicidal Tendencies, The Faceless and Lillake) would be touring with them on lead guitar.

On November 14, 2023, the band released the title track of their upcoming tenth studio album, Perpetual Terminal, which was released on February 23, 2024.

== Musical style and influences ==
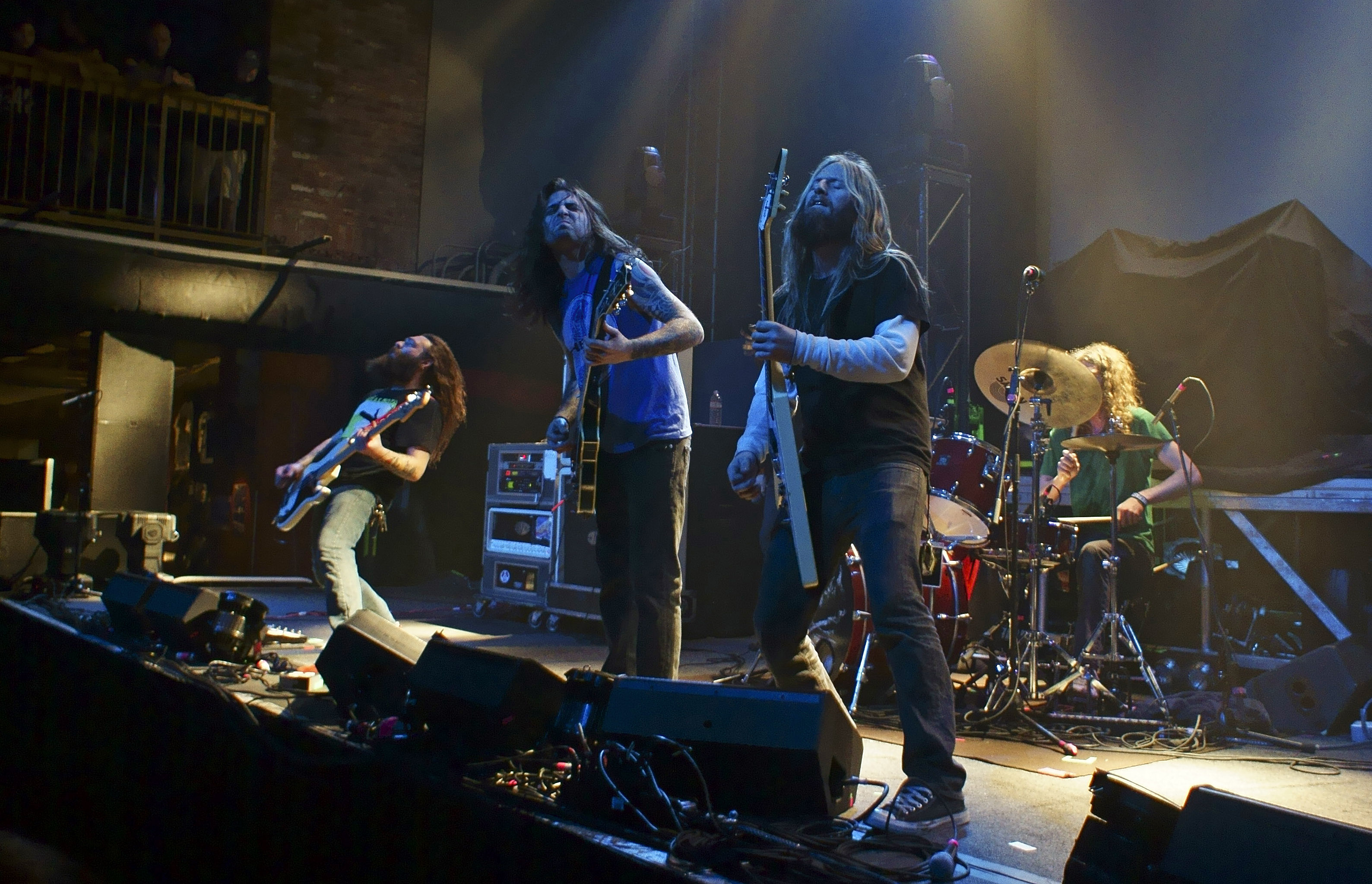
Darkest Hour in 2012

The band's sound has been described as a blend of melodic death metal and metalcore.

They have stated that they are heavily influenced by Swedish death metal. Guitarist Kris Norris said in an interview, "Well, put it this way – if you took an encyclopedia of metal, you could list just about every Scandinavian band as our influences! It's not really any one particular band; we wouldn't say that we're influenced by, say, In Flames or At The Gates, it's every band from there."

Other influences include Dark Tranquillity, Minor Threat, Earth Crisis, Bad Brains, Black Flag, Van Halen, Government Issue, Scream, Shadows Fall, Entombed, Dismember, Sacrilege, The Crown, Ozzy Osbourne, Metallica, Megadeth, Slayer, Anthrax, Iron Maiden, Dream Theater, Carcass, Arch Enemy, Sick of it All, Dead Kennedys, Soilwork, Danzig, Venom, Exodus, Discharge, Cro-Mags, Integrity, Edge of Sanity, Mayhem, Emperor, Ulver, Testament, Death Angel, Pantera, and Cannibal Corpse.

Darkest Hour's main guitar influences are Zakk Wylde, Dimebag Darrell, James Hetfield, Dave Mustaine, and Scott Ian.

== Band members ==
Current

- John Henry – vocals (1995–present)
- Mike Schleibaum – rhythm guitar (1995–present), lead guitar (1995–1999, 2020–2021)
- Aaron Deal – bass (2011–present)
- Travis Orbin – drums (2012–present)
- Nico Santora – lead guitar (2021–present)

Former

- Raul Mayorga – bass (1995–1998)
- Matt Maben – drums (1995–1999)
- Billups Allen – bass (1999–2001)
- Fred Ziomek – lead guitar (1999–2002)
- Kris Norris – lead guitar (2002–2008)
- Ryan Parrish – drums (1999–2011)
- Paul Burnette – bass (2001–2011)
- Mike "Lonestar" Carrigan – lead guitar (2008–2020)
- Timothy Java – drums (2011–2012)

== Discography ==
Studio albums

| Year | Album details | Peak chart positions | | |
| Year | Album details | US | US Heat. | US Ind. |
|---|---|---|---|---|
| 2000 | The Mark of the Judas: Released: July 18, 2000; Label: MIA | — | — | — |
| 2001 | So Sedated, So Secure: Released: April, 2001; Label: Victory | — | — | — |
| 2003 | Hidden Hands of a Sadist Nation: Released: May 20, 2003; Label: Victory | — | — | — |
| 2005 | Undoing Ruin: Released: June 28, 2005; Label: Victory | 138 | 2 | 10 |
| 2007 | Deliver Us: Released: July 10, 2007; Label: Victory | 110 | 1 | 14 |
| 2009 | The Eternal Return: Released: June 23, 2009; Label: Victory | 104 | 1 | 16 |
| 2011 | The Human Romance: Released: February 22, 2011; Label: eOne | 185 | 3 | 23 |
| 2014 | Darkest Hour: Released: August 5, 2014; Label: Sumerian | 102 | — | 11 |
| 2017 | Godless Prophets & the Migrant Flora: Released: March 10, 2017; Label: Southern Lord | 42 | 1 | — |
| 2024 | Perpetual Terminal: Released: February 23, 2024; Label: MNRK Heavy | — | — | — |
| 2026 | Suffer Divine: Released: October 30, 2026; Label: MNRK Heavy | — | — | — |

Compilations

- Archives (2006), A-F Records

EPs

- The Misanthrope (1996), Death Truck Records
- The Prophecy Fulfilled (1999), Art Monk Construction

Splits

- w/ Groundzero (1999), East Coast Empire
- Where Heroes Go to Die w/ Dawncore (2001), Join the Team Player
- w/ Set My Path (2004), April 78

DVDs

- Party Scars and Prison Bars: A Thrashography (DVD, 2005)
- Party Scars and Prison Bars Two and a Half: Live - Undoing Ruin (DVD, 2017)

=== Non-album tracks ===
| Year | Song | Appears on |
|---|---|---|
| 2007 | "Nazi Punks Fuck Off" (Dead Kennedys cover) | Higher Voltage!: Another Brief History of Rock |
| 2014 | "Spectrum" (Florence + The Machine cover) | Sumerian Ceremonials (Florence + The Sphinx) |

== Music videos ==
| Year | Song | Director |
|---|---|---|
| 2003 | "The Sadist Nation" | |
| 2004 | "Oklahoma" | |
| 2005 | "Convalescence" | Dale Resteghini |
| 2005 | "Sound The Surrender" | Joseph Pattisall |
| 2007 | "Demon(s)" | Joseph Pattisall |
| 2007 | "The Sadist Nation (Hidden Hands DVD Alternate Version)" | |
| 2009 | "The Tides" (unreleased) | |
| 2011 | "Love As A Weapon" | Scott Hansen |
| 2011 | "Your Everyday Disaster" | John Ryan Flaherty |
| 2011 | "Savor The Kill" | Ramon Boutviseth |
| 2012 | "Severed Into Separates" | Mihaszna Film |
| 2014 | "Rapture In Exile" | Taylor Larson |
| 2014 | "Rapture In Exile (Rehearsal Video)" | |
| 2014 | "The Misery We Make" | Taylor Larson |
| 2014 | "By The Starlight" | Mareesa Stertz |
| 2018 | "Enter Oblivion" | John Henry |
| 2023 | "Perpetual Terminal" | Mirko Witzki |
| 2023 | "Societal Bile" | Darkest Hour & Chad Fjerstad |
| 2024 | "One With the Void" | Mirko Witzki |
| 2026 | "Suffer Divine" | Thomas Mignone |
| 2026 | "Warrior" | Thomas Mignone |
