= Kris Norris =

American guitarist

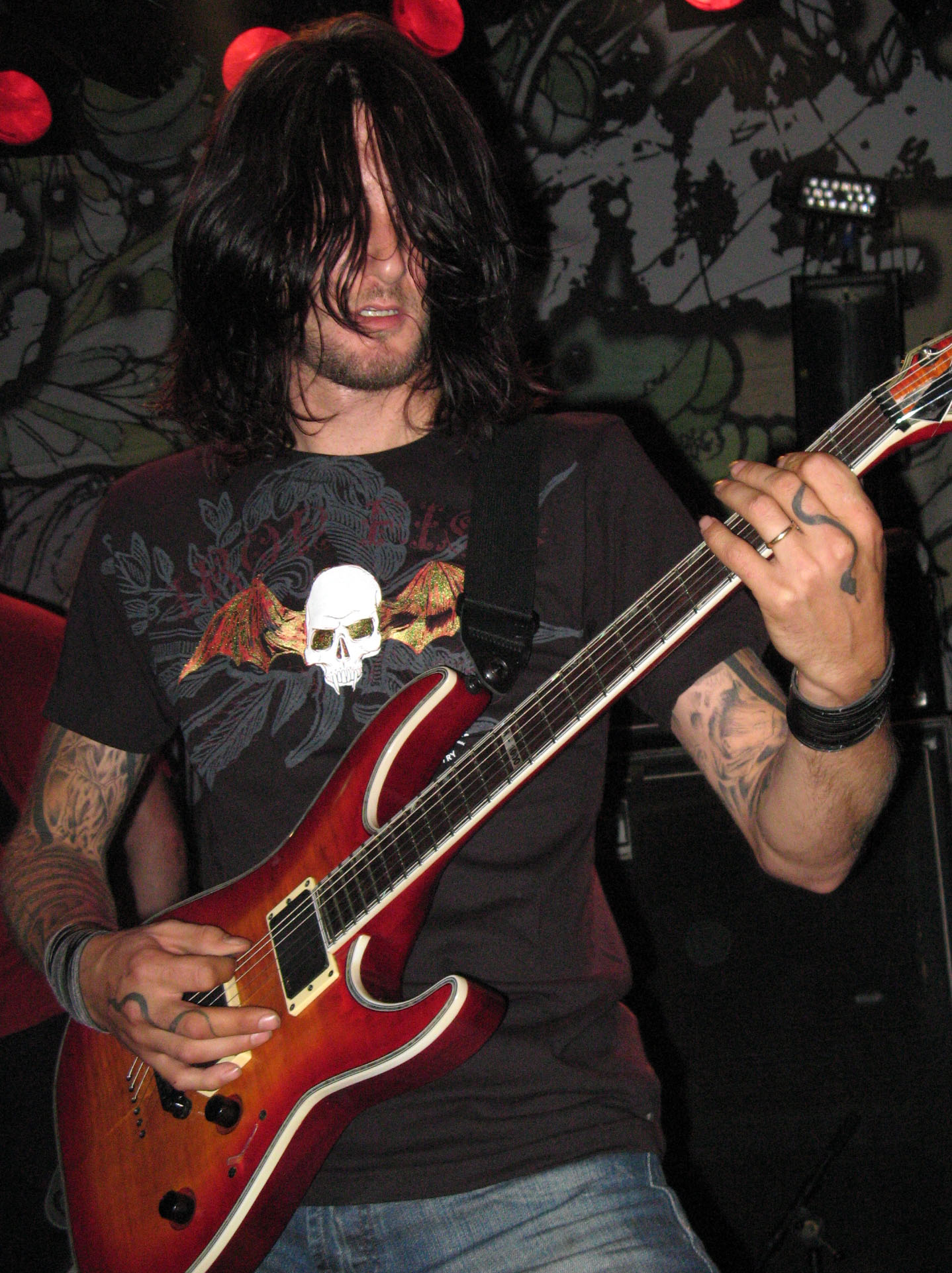
- Norris performing with Darkest Hour in 2007

Background information
- Born: August 31, 1978 (age 47)
- Genres: Melodic death metal; metalcore; progressive metal; heavy metal
- Occupations: Musician; producer
- Instrument: Guitar
- Years active: 1994–present

Kris Norris (born August 31, 1978) is an American musician. He is a former guitarist for heavy metal bands Scar the Martyr, Darkest Hour and Threat Signal. He is also known for his stints as touring guitarist for God Forbid and Straight Line Stitch. Kris released a solo record "Icons of the Illogical" with The Kris Norris Projekt on Magna Carta Records in early 2009.

== History ==
In 1995, Kris had moved from Ohio to Richmond, VA with his family and quickly became friends with Cory Smoot (late-guitarist of Gwar). Through Cory, he met Ryan Parrish. Kris and Ryan would form a death metal band called Gutted. A couple of years later, Norris traveled to Norway which would help on his Scandinavian death metal influence for a band called Disinterment That band's notable members included Ryan Parrish on drums and Norris' friend Tommy Gun (formerly in Immortal Avenger on guitar). Gun and Norris would later form a band called Narsilion. In 2001, Norris would help form Locus Factor; but shortly would join Darkest Hour for their 3rd full-length record, Hidden Hands of a Sadist Nation. He is currently living in Palm Coast, Florida, married, and has a child. He has left Darkest Hour to pursue career options in metal production. Kris released his first solo album with the Kris Norris Projekt. The album "Icons of the Illogical" was released in January 2009 on Magna Carta Records. Kris' recently provided production and guest lead guitar to an album by the Washington D.C. band Fierce Allegiance as well as a guest guitar solo on the God Forbid track "Earthsblood", from the album of the same name. Norris is now reported to be the temporary replacement guitarist for God Forbid on the upcoming tour with Lamb of God for which Dallas Coyle left the band.

He started The Kris Norris Projekt in 2008.

In 2009, Kris formed The Godless Symphony with vocalist Dan Malloy.

In the summer of 2010, Kris started recording Condemn the Infection's first full-length album, under Running with Scissors Productions. The album will be released in October 2010.

He acted as a temporary touring guitarist with Threat Signal after their previous guitarist, Adam Weber, quit in July 2010.

In November 2010, he filled in on guitar for Straight Line Stitch after guitarist Pat Pattison temporarily left during their recent tour with Soulfly

As of March 2011, Kris has officially joined Straight Line Stitch. "Former DARKEST HOUR guitarist Kris Norris has officially joined metalcore band Straight Line Stitch after two fill in tours. Norris has issued the following statement

"I'm excited. It's a new avenue for me. Even though they have a new record coming out soon, I can't wait to start writing and put some solos to the catchy tunes these guys write. It'll be a challenge to accent her voice but Kanky's mind-blowing drum skills will also be the perfect mix to add some nice but faster melodic work."

As of December 2011, Kris had left Straight line Stitch stating on his Facebook account "I feel that this would be appropriate to announce my departure from Straight Line Stitch" just a couple days after Seth Thacker and Kanky Lora left the band.

Kris has also teamed up yet again with Ryan Parrish, as well as Kristen Randall (ex-Winds of Plague, keyboards), Dave Sheldon (ex-Annihilator, vocals), and Pat Kavanagh (Threat Signal/Arkaea, bass) in a group called A Cancerous Affair.

As of April 2012, he is currently filling in on guitar with his previous band Straight Line Stitch on their current tour with their returning original drummer and new guitarist.

In 2013, Kris announced a new band with Darkest Hour's drummer Ryan Parrish. The band is called Blisskill. A song demo has been posted on his SoundCloud. Recently, an IndieGoGo campaign was started to fund the recording of their debut album.

== Guitars and equipment ==
ESP M-II Standard W/EMG 81-X/85-X
Schecter Guitar Research Hellraiser Extreme C-1(Scar the Martyr)
Schecter Guitar Research Hellraiser C-8 (White)(Scar the Martyr – Blood Host Video)
ESP Ltd. H-1000 (1 Black, 1 Sunburst)
ESP Alexi Laiho Standard
ESP Ltd. Alexi-600
ESP Ltd. EC-300P
ESP Ltd. EX-50 (Modified)
ESP Ltd. H-400
ESP Ltd. MH-250
ESP Ltd. MH-400NT
ESP Ltd. H-1001
ESP Ltd. MHB-400
Ibanez S7320
Peavey JSX Joe Satriani Signature Guitar Head
Peavey 6505 Guitar Head
Peavey XXX Guitar Head
Peavey 5150 Guitar Head
Mesa/Boogie 4x12 Rectifier Standard Guitar Cabinet
Emperor Custom 4x12 Guitar Cabinet
Marshall 1960AC 4x12 Guitar Cabinet

== Discography ==
=== As band member ===
Locus Factor

- What Drives 1? (2001)
- The EMMQ (1.5) (EP) (2001)
- Locus Factor (Demo) (2002)
- Between Saviors and Thieves (2003)

Darkest Hour

- Hidden Hands of a Sadist Nation (2003)
- Undoing Ruin (2005)
- Deliver Us (2007)

The Kris Norris Projekt

- Icons of the Illogical (2009)

Scar the Martyr

- Scar the Martyr (2013)

Vimic

- open your omen

=== As guest musician ===
- Mensrea – Mensrea (2005)
- God Forbid – Earthsblood (2009)
- Austrian Death Machine – Double Brutal (2009)
