= Gone Forever =

Studio album by God Forbid
- Released: February 24, 2004
- Genres: Metalcore, thrash metal
- Length: 41:38
- Label: Century Media
- Producer: Eric Rachel

God Forbid chronology
Better Days (2003)	Gone Forever (2004)	IV: Constitution of Treason (2005)

Singles from Gone Forever
- 1. "Better Days" Released: December 9, 2003 (EP)

Professional ratings
Review scores
Source	Rating
Allmusic	4/5 stars
Scream Magazine	4/6 stars

Gone Forever is the third full-length studio album by American heavy metal band God Forbid. Jeff Loomis of Nevermore contributes the solo on track 7, "Soul Engraved". Track 2, "Antihero", was used in a sampler track hidden in Shadows Fall's album The War Within. Three music videos were released from this album for the tracks "Antihero", "Better Days" and the title track. The album entered the Top Independent Albums chart at number 34. The album has a different sound from their previous two albums, featuring strong thrash metal elements that would be included on all their following releases.

== Background ==
In June of 2003, the band announced they would be entering Trax Studio to begin work on their third full-length album for Century Media in July. While at that point the release had not been titled, they also shared that Eric Rachel would handle producing duties, while Colin Richardson would be handling mixing. In April of 2004 the band shared that fans were wanted for a music video that they would be shooting for the track "Antihero," with Dale Resteghini at CBC Media in Islandia, NY.

The band's tour with A Life Once Lost was filmed for a music video (directed by Zach Merck) for the track "Gone Forever."

== Track listing ==
All tracks are written by God Forbid.

No.	Title	Length
1.	"Force-Fed"	4:38
2.	"Antihero"	3:57
3.	"Better Days"	3:54
4.	"Precious Lie"	4:52
5.	"Washed-Out World"	5:37
6.	"Living Nightmare"	4:19
7.	"Soul Engraved"	3:57
8.	"Gone Forever"	4:28
9.	"Judge the Blood"	5:59
Total length:		41:38

Japanese bonus tracks
No.	Title	Length
10.	"Allegiance"	3:58
11.	"Mind Eraser"	1:08
Total length:		46:04

European bonus tracks
No.	Title	Length
10.	"Wicked" (demo)	3:51
11.	"Reject the Sickness"	3:29
12.	"Mind Eraser"	1:08
Total length:		49:26

== Personnel ==
- Byron Davis – lead vocals
- Doc Coyle – lead guitar, clean vocals
- Dallas Coyle – rhythm guitar, clean vocals
- John "Beeker" Outcalt – bass guitar
- Corey Pierce – drums
- Jeff Loomis – lead guitar on track 7
- Thomas Cummings – vocals on track 7
- Michael Pinnella – keyboards on tracks 1, 4, 5 and 8
- Eric Rachel – production, engineering
- Colin Richardson – mixing
- Steve Evetts – mastering
