= Deliver Us (Darkest Hour album) =

Studio album by Darkest Hour
- Released: July 10, 2007
- Recorded: March 1 – April 1, 2007
- Studio: Greenhouse Studios in Vancouver, British Columbia, Canada
- Genre: Melodic death metal, metalcore
- Length: 39:37
- Label: Victory
- Producer: Devin Townsend

Darkest Hour chronology
| Archives (2006) | Deliver Us (2007) | The Eternal Return (2009) |

Professional ratings
Review scores
| Source | Rating |
|---|---|
| AllMusic | 4/5 stars |
| Alternative Press | 4.5/5 stars |
| Blabbermouth.net | 7.5/10 |
| MetalSucks | 3/5 stars |
| Punknews.org | 4.5/5 stars |
| Sputnikmusic | 4.5/5 stars |

Deliver Us is the fifth studio album by American melodic death metal band Darkest Hour. It was produced by Devin Townsend, and released on July 10, 2007 through Victory Records. The album debuted at number 110 on the Billboard album charts, with sales of 6,600. "Sanctuary" is featured in the video game Tony Hawk's Proving Ground, while "Demon(s)" is featured in Guitar Hero 5 and "Doomsayer" was made available in Guitar Hero: Warriors of Rock through the Darkest Hour Track Pack, the last to be released by Activision. The artwork was created by John Baizley who has also done art for bands such as Pig Destroyer and his own band Baroness. It is also the last album to feature lead guitarist Kris Norris.

== Track listing ==
| No. | Title | Length |
|---|---|---|
| 1. | "Doomsayer (the Beginning of the End)" | 4:33 |
| 2. | "Sanctuary" | 2:13 |
| 3. | "Demon(s)" | 3:48 |
| 4. | "An Ethereal Drain" | 3:56 |
| 5. | "A Paradox with Flies" | 4:26 |
| 6. | "The Light at the Edge of the World" | 1:42 |
| 7. | "Stand and Receive Your Judgment" | 2:38 |
| 8. | "Tunguska" | 5:32 |
| 9. | "Fire in the Skies" | 3:19 |
| 10. | "Closing on the Day" (Bonus track on the FYE special edition of the album) | 2:46 |
| 11. | "Full Imperial Collapse" | 2:39 |
| 12. | "Deliver Us" | 4:47 |
| Total length: | | 39:37 |

== Personnel ==
- John Henry – vocals
- Kris Norris – lead guitar
- Mike Schleibaum – rhythm guitar
- Paul Burnette – bass
- Ryan Parrish – drums

Production

- Devin Townsend – production, mixing, engineering, guitar ("Full Imperial Collapse")
- Dean Maher – engineering
- UE Nastasi – mastering
- Marian Greksa – mix assistant, additional vocals ("The Light at the Edge of the World")

== Use in media ==
- The song "Demon(s)" can be heard in the episode "Escape from Dragon House" of HBO's True Blood. It is also a playable track in Guitar Hero 5.
