= Equilibrium (God Forbid album) =

Studio album by God Forbid
- Released: March 26, 2012
- Genre: Metalcore, thrash metal
- Length: 53:56
- Label: Victory
- Producer: Mark Lewis, Jason Suecof, Jens Bogren

God Forbid chronology
| Earthsblood (2009) | Equilibrium (2012) |

Singles from Equilibrium
- 1. "Where We Come From" Released: March 13, 2012

Equilibrium is the sixth studio album by the American metal band God Forbid. The album was released on March 26, 2012, through Victory Records. This was the band’s final album before their split from 2013 to 2022, and their only album to feature rhythm guitarist Matt Wicklund. The song "Equilibrium" is featured as the official theme of TNA's PPV Turning Point 2012.

== Track listing ==
All tracks are written by God Forbid.

| No. | Title | Length |
|---|---|---|
| 1. | "Don't Tell Me What to Dream" | 3:07 |
| 2. | "My Rebirth" | 4:52 |
| 3. | "A Few Good Men" | 3:49 |
| 4. | "Scraping the Walls" | 4:01 |
| 5. | "Conquer" | 4:14 |
| 6. | "Equilibrium" | 5:01 |
| 7. | "Overcome" | 4:38 |
| 8. | "Cornered" | 4:19 |
| 9. | "This Is Who I Am" | 4:12 |
| 10. | "Move On" | 5:17 |
| 11. | "Pages" | 3:44 |
| 12. | "Awakening" | 2:35 |
| 13. | "Where We Come From" | 3:59 |
| Total length: | | 53:56 |

== Credits ==
=== God Forbid ===
- Byron Davis – lead vocals
- Doc Coyle – lead guitar, backing vocals
- John "Beeker" Outcalt – bass
- Matt Wicklund – rhythm guitar
- Corey Pierce – drums

=== Additional personnel ===
- Mark Lewis - producer
- Jason Suecof - producer
- Jens Bogren - mixing, mastering

== Charts ==
| Chart (2012) | Peak position |
|---|---|
| US Billboard 200 | 156 |
| US Heatseekers Albums (Billboard) | 7 |
| US Independent Albums (Billboard) | 28 |
| US Top Hard Rock Albums (Billboard) | 14 |
| US Top Rock Albums (Billboard) | 39 |
