= Self-determination (disambiguation) =

Self-determination is the right of nations to make their own decisions without interference from others.

Self-determination may also refer to:

- Self-determination, a human rights concept
- Self-determination theory, a theory of human motivation and personality
- Gender self-determination
- Self-ownership, property in one's own person
- Informational self-determination
- African-American self-determination
- Vetëvendosje, Albanian for self-determination, a progressive political movement in Kosovo

== See also ==
- Determination (disambiguation)
