= IV: Constitution of Treason =

Studio album by God Forbid
- Released: September 20, 2005
- Recorded: Audio Hammer Studios (Sanford, Florida); Trax East Studios (South River, New Jersey)
- Genres: Metalcore, thrash metal
- Length: 50:21
- Label: Century Media
- Producers: Jason Suecof; Eric Rachel; Dallas Coyle; Doc Coyle

God Forbid chronology
Gone Forever (2004)	IV: Constitution of Treason (2005)	Earthsblood (2009)

Professional ratings
Review scores
Source	Rating
AllMusic	4.5/5 stars

IV: Constitution of Treason is the fourth studio album by the New Jersey heavy metal quintet God Forbid. It is a concept album telling the story of a futuristic society that destroys itself, reforms many years later, and eventually destroys itself again in the same way as originally. The band's guitarist has said that the album's basic theme is the fact that humanity in general does not seem to learn from its mistakes. Three music videos were released from this album for the tracks "The End of the World", "Chains of Humanity" and "To the Fallen Hero". There is a special edition DualDisc version of this album, with a DVD documentary about the making of IV: Constitution of Treason entitled "The Act of Treason". This is the first album to chart, peaking at number 118 on the Billboard 200 selling 8,300 copies.

== Track listing ==
All tracks are written by God Forbid except where noted.

Article I: Twilight of Civilization
No.	Title	Length
1.	"The End of the World"	6:09
2.	"Chains of Humanity"	4:03
3.	"Into the Wasteland"	3:59

Article II: In the Darkest Hour, There Was One
No.	Title	Length
4.	"The Lonely Dead"	6:52
5.	"Divinity"	4:10
6.	"Under This Flag"	5:45
7.	"To the Fallen Hero"	4:43

Article III: Devolution
No.	Title	Length
8.	"Welcome to the Apocalypse (Preamble)" (Written by Dallas Coyle)	4:07
9.	"Constitution of Treason"	4:31
10.	"Crucify Your Beliefs"	6:02
Total length:		50:21

== Personnel ==
- Byron Davis – lead vocals, clean vocals on "To the Fallen Hero"
- Doc Coyle – lead guitar, clean vocals
- Dallas Coyle – rhythm guitar, clean vocals
- John "Beeker" Outcalt – bass
- Corey Pierce – drums
- Tony Schreck – keyboards, electronics and programming
- Jason Suecof – additional guitars on tracks 2, 3, 6 & 7, guitar solo on "Into the Wasteland"
- Kevin Coyle (aka "Dad Forbid") – piano outro on "The Lonely Dead"
- Brian Bonilla – spoken word on "Welcome to the Apocalypse (Preamble)"
- Eric Rachel – mixing
- Roger Lian – mastering
