= Earthsblood =

Studio album by God Forbid
- Released: February 24, 2009
- Recorded: Trax East
- Genre: Metalcore, thrash metal
- Length: 55:01
- Label: Century Media
- Producer: Eric Rachel

God Forbid chronology
IV: Constitution of Treason (2005)	Earthsblood (2009)	Equilibrium (2012)

Professional ratings
Review scores
Source	Rating
Allmusic	link
Alternative Press	link
Blabbermouth.net	link
Rock Sound	link

Earthsblood is the fifth studio album by the American heavy metal band God Forbid. It was released in 2009, on February 16 in Europe and February 24 in North America, through Century Media Records. The album was produced by Eric Rachel with Christian Olde Wolbers handling all vocal tracking. The mixing was by Jens Bogren, and the artwork was by Gustavo Sazes. This is the last God Forbid album with rhythm guitarist Dallas Coyle. The song "Empire of the Gun" is a downloadable track for the video game Rock Band.

The album sold around 5,400 copies in its first week of release to reach No. 110 on The Billboard 200 chart.

== Track listing ==
All tracks are written by God Forbid.

No.	Title	Length
1.	"The Discovery"	1:43
2.	"The Rain"	5:21
3.	"Empire of the Gun"	4:43
4.	"War of Attrition"	4:27
5.	"The New Clear"	6:36
6.	"Shallow"	3:31
7.	"Walk Alone"	6:14
8.	"Bat the Angels"	6:06
9.	"Earthsblood"	9:03
10.	"Gaia (The Vultures)"	7:17
Total length:		55:01

Live at the Starland Ballroom
No.	Title	Length
1.	"Force-Fed"	5:22
2.	"Chains of Humanity"	4:46
3.	"Divide My Destiny"	3:58
4.	"Go Your Own Way"	4:00
5.	"Anti-Hero"	4:51
6.	"Better Days"	4:27
7.	"Lonely Dead"	6:27
8.	"Reject the Sickness"	3:56
9.	"Gone Forever"	5:07
10.	"Broken Promise"	5:33
11.	"To the Fallen Hero"	5:22
12.	"The End of the World"	6:17
13.	"Crucify Your Beliefs"	7:26
Total length:		65:32

== Personnel ==
- Byron Davis – lead vocals
- Doc Coyle – lead guitar, backing vocals
- Dallas Coyle – rhythm guitar, clean vocals
- John "Beeker" Outcalt – bass guitar
- Corey Pierce – drums
- Michael Pinnella – keyboards on tracks 8 and 9
- Michael Romeo – orchestra on tracks 1 and 10
