= The Prophecy Fulfilled =

EP by Darkest Hour
- Released: May 20, 1999
- Recorded: February & March, 1998
- Studios: Phase Recordings, College Park, Maryland
- Genres: Metalcore; sludge metal
- Length: 24:38
- Label: Art Monk Construct
- Producers: Darkest Hour; Ken Olden

Darkest Hour chronology
The Misanthrope (1996)	The Prophecy Fulfilled (1999)	The Mark of the Judas (2000)

The Prophecy Fulfilled is the second EP by metal band Darkest Hour and was released on May 20, 1999. It was the band's last EP, before their debut album The Mark of the Judas.

== Track listing ==
No.	Title	Length
1.	"Choir of the Prophecy Fulfilled"	5:41
2.	"Reflections of Ruin"	3:50
3.	"Broken Wings"	3:20
4.	"This Side of the Nightmare"	4:09
5.	"This Curse"	6:44
6.	"Coda XIII" (Instrumental)	5:03

== Reception ==
Professional ratings
Review scores
Source	Rating
Allmusic	2/5 stars

AllMusic stated: "Heavier than real heavy…things, crushing highlights such as 'The Choir of Prophecy Fulfilled' and 'This Side of the Nightmare' basked in uncompromisingly ruthless death metal ferocity, while the slower passages heard on 'Reflections of Ruin' and the especially malevolent 'This Curse' were reminiscent of punishing Southern sludgecore."

== Personnel ==
Darkest Hour

- John Henry – vocals, organ, keyboards, piano
- Mike Schleibaum – guitars
- Billups Allen – bass
- Matt Mabben – drums

Production

- Produced by Darkest Hour and Ken Olden
- Bruce Falkinburg – engineering
- Ben Mellot – engineering (tracks 3 and 6)
- Rob Christensen – mastering
- Issa Diao – editing
