= God Forbid =

American metal band

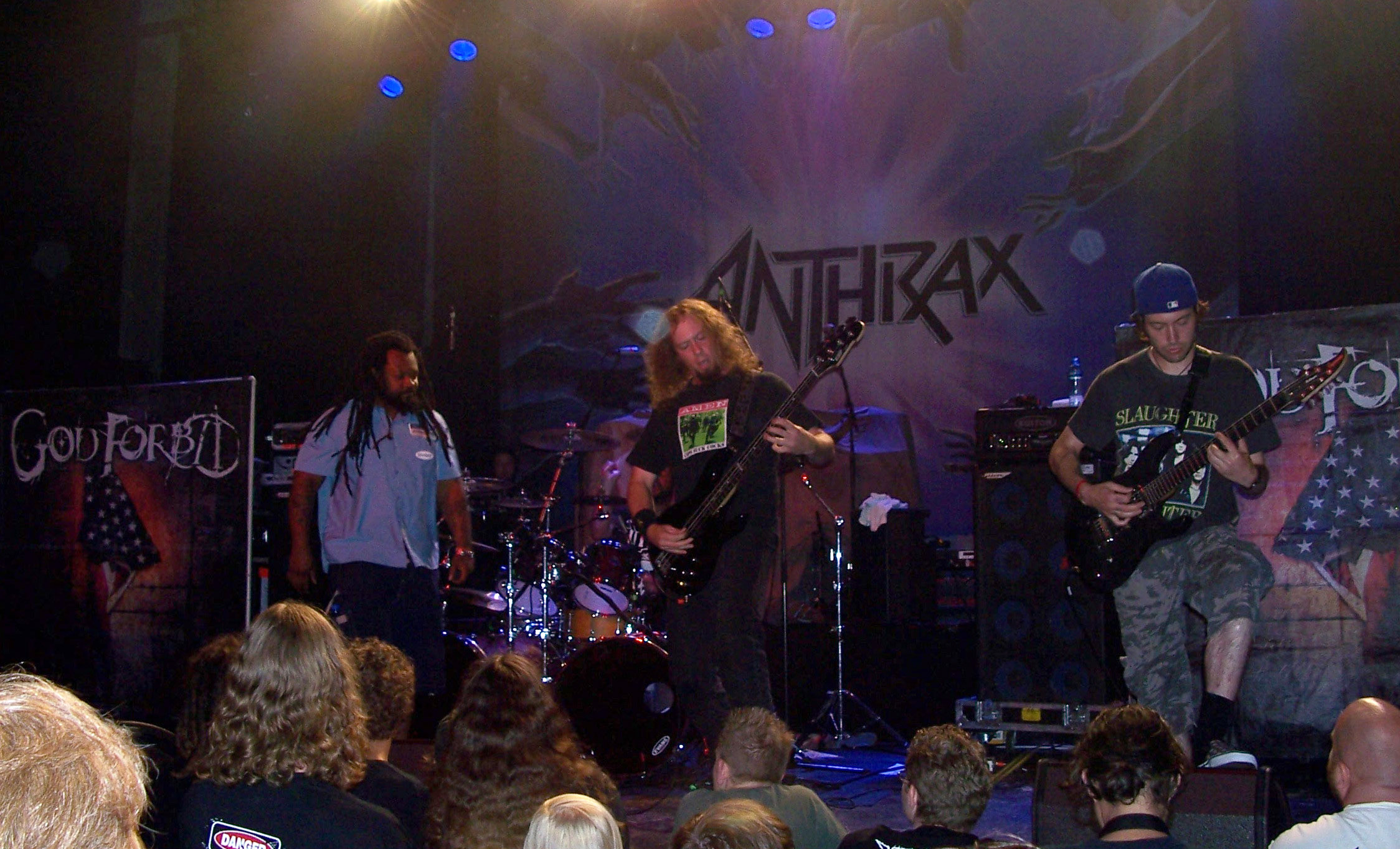
- God Forbid performing in the Netherlands in 2009

Background information
- Origin: East Brunswick, New Jersey, U.S.
- Genres: Metalcore; thrash metal
- Years active: 1996–2013, 2022–present
- Labels: Victory; Century Media; We Put Out; 9 Volt
- Members: Doc Coyle; Corey Pierce; Byron Davis; John Outcalt
- Past members: Dallas Coyle; Matt Wicklund

God Forbid is an American heavy metal band formed in East Brunswick, New Jersey in 1996. They broke up in 2013 but have been semi-active since reuniting in 2022.

== History ==
=== Early career (1996–2004) ===
God Forbid developed a following in the late 1990s by touring with bands such as Gwar, Nile, Cradle of Filth and Candiria. 9volt Industries released God Forbid's first full album, Reject the Sickness, in 1999. This album received heavy rotation from WSOU-FM in the South Orange, New Jersey area. The band signed to Century Media Records and released the album Determination in 2001. They played on the MTV2 Headbangers Ball tour with Shadows Fall and Lamb of God.

=== Breakthrough (2004–2013) ===
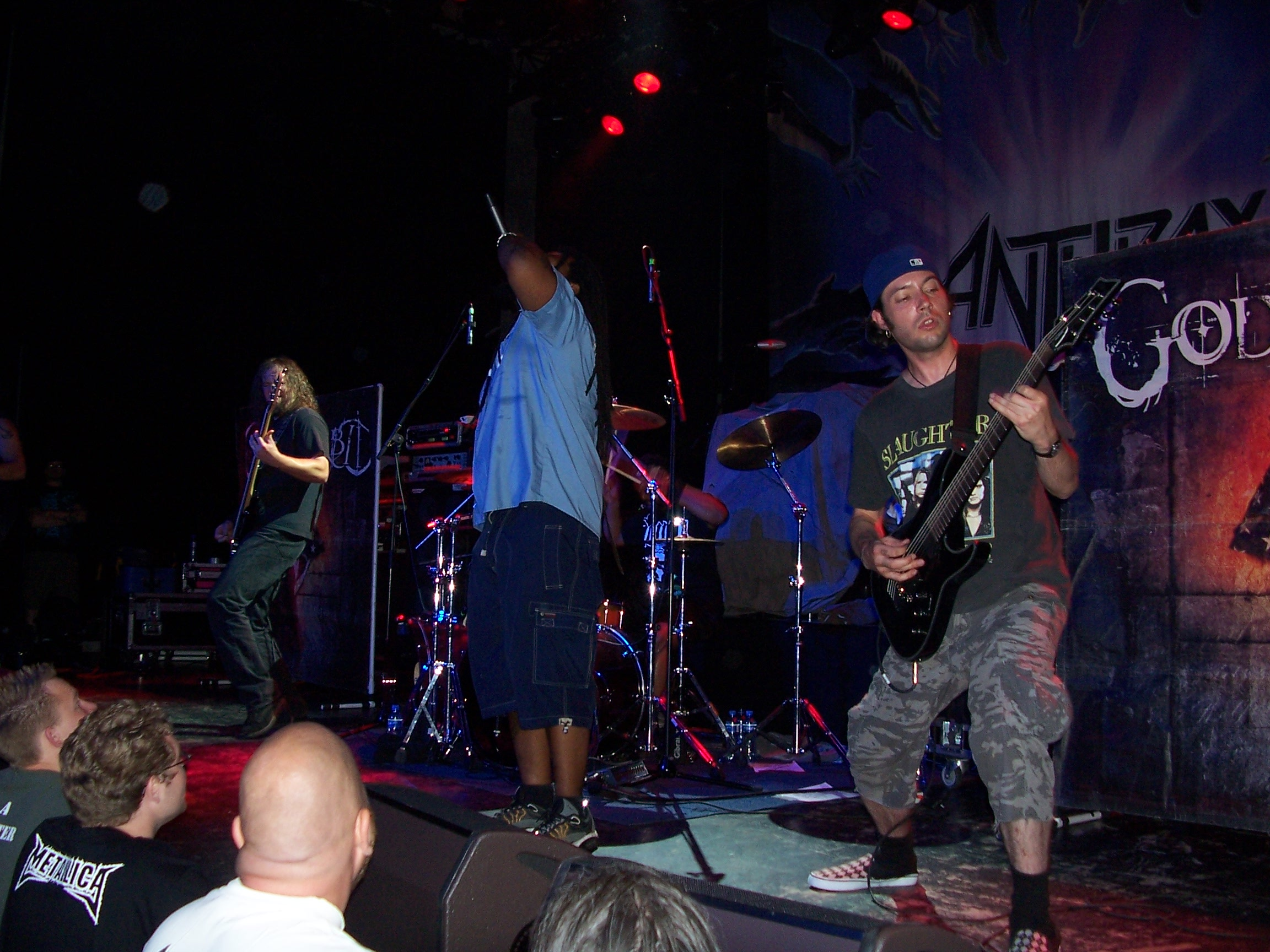
God Forbid performing in the Netherlands in 2009

In 2004, they released Gone Forever, which, along with a slot on Ozzfest's second-stage, increased their profile. The next year, they released IV: Constitution of Treason, a concept album about the end of the world. It was their first album to enter the Billboard 200, debuting at number 118. In 2005 and 2006, they supported Trivium on their UK tour with Mendeed and Bloodsimple. In late 2006 and early 2007, they headlined the Chains of Humanity tour.

In 2007, God Forbid's "To the Fallen Hero" won the Independent Music Award for Best Hard Rock/Heavy Metal Song. They released a DVD on June 10, 2008, and released their fifth studio album, Earthsblood, on February 24, 2009. It landed at number 110 on the Billboard 200. God Forbid toured across the United States and Canada in the No Fear Energy Music Tour featuring Lamb of God and others in April.

In March 2009, Dallas Coyle left the band. His replacement for the upcoming tour was former Darkest Hour guitarist Kris Norris. He was later replaced with Matt Wicklund. In July 2009, God Forbid participated in the Rockstar Mayhem Festival along with Trivium, Bullet for My Valentine, Cannibal Corpse, All That Remains, Slayer, Marilyn Manson and many others.

In April 2010, the band issued an update that they started work on a new album titled Equilibrium. It was released on March 26, 2012.

From July 13 to August 28, 2012, God Forbid took part in Metal Hammer's "Trespass America Festival" headlined by Five Finger Death Punch with additional support from Battlecross, Emmure, Pop Evil, Trivium and Killswitch Engage.

In late 2012, the band co-headlined the Party To The Apocalypse 2012 tour with Shadows Fall starring Thy Will Be Done and Trumpet The Harlot.

=== Breakup (2013–2022) ===
On August 16, 2013, Doc Coyle posted on his personal website that he had left God Forbid. Following this, Corey Pierce said in a post on his Facebook page, "No more suspense, God Forbid is over. Sorry". After this, Byron Davis posted on his Facebook page, "It's Friday and my boy is home doing well and yes it's true GF is down. We are a family for the most part some move on while others keep it real like before the band began. I should feel sad but I don't right now because a new chapter has begun. I'll be seeing you all around somewhere. Believe that. Uncle Corey J needs some drums I have a guitar too for him. Blabbering".

During the hiatus, Doc Coyle joined Bad Wolves.

=== Reunion (2022–present) ===
In March 2022, the band announced they would reunite for the 2022 Blue Ridge Rock Festival in September, making it the first time in nine years the band would perform. Four months later, it was announced that former As I Lay Dying guitarist Nick Hipa would perform with the band for their reunion show. Doc clarified in an interview after the Blue Ridge show that God Forbid was not returning to being a "full-time thing", but they would play two dates in January 2023 at the Starland Ballroom in Sayreville, New Jersey, and the Worcester Palladium in Massachusetts.

== Musical style ==
God Forbid has been primarily described as metalcore and thrash metal. They are part of the new wave of American heavy metal.

== Band members ==
=== Current members ===
- Doc Coyle — lead guitar, backing vocals (1996–2013, 2022–present)
- Corey Pierce — drums (1996–2013, 2022–present)
- Byron Davis — lead vocals (1997–2013, 2022–present)
- John "Beeker" Outcalt — bass (1997–2013, 2022–present)

=== Current touring members ===
- Nick Hipa — rhythm guitar (2022–present)

=== Former members ===
- Dallas Coyle — rhythm guitar, backing vocals (1996–2009)
- Matt Wicklund — rhythm guitar, backing vocals (2009–2013)

=== Touring ===
- Kris Norris — rhythm guitar (2009)

== Discography ==
=== Studio albums ===
- Reject the Sickness (1999)
- Determination (2001)
- Gone Forever (2004)
- IV: Constitution of Treason (2005)
- Earthsblood (2009)
- Equilibrium (2012)

=== EPs ===
- Out of Misery (1998)
- Better Days (2003)

=== Singles ===
- "To the Fallen Hero" (2006, strictly limited tour single)

=== Compilation albums ===
- Bring You to Your Knees...Guns N' Roses (2004)
- Sickness and Misery (2007)

=== Videos ===
- Beneath the Scars of Glory and Progression (2008, DVD)
