= Determination (God Forbid album) =

Studio album by God Forbid
- Released: April 17, 2001
- Genre: Metalcore, melodic death metal
- Length: 46:51
- Label: Century Media
- Producer: Zeuss, Eric Rachel

God Forbid chronology
Reject the Sickness (1999)	Determination (2001)	Better Days (2003)

Determination is the second full-length studio album by the New Jersey heavy metal quintet God Forbid. It was released on April 17, 2001, through Century Media Records. The album was reissued on Vinyl in 2021 to celebrate the album’s twentieth anniversary.

Professional ratings
Review scores
Source	Rating
AllMusic	3/5 stars
Drowned in Sound	7/10 stars
Metal.de	8/10 stars
Lambgoat	8/10 stars
Chronicles of Chaos	9.5/10 stars

== Track listing ==
All tracks are written by God Forbid.

No.	Title	Length
1.	"Dawn of the Millennia"	1:28
2.	"Nothing"	2:51
3.	"Broken Promise"	4:38
4.	"Divide My Destiny"	5:19
5.	"Network"	4:25
6.	"Wicked"	3:52
7.	"Determination Part 1"	3:47
8.	"Determination Part 2"	4:33
9.	"Go Your Own Way"	3:35
10.	"God's Last Gift"	4:30
11.	"A Reflection of the Past"	1:49
12.	"Dead Words on Deaf Ears"	6:04
Total length:		46:51

== Personnel ==
- Byron Davis – lead vocals
- Doc Coyle – lead guitar
- Dallas Coyle – rhythm guitar
- John "Beeker" Outcalt – bass guitar
- Corey Pierce – drums

Production

- Zeuss - producer, engineering
- Eric Rachel - co producer, mixing
- Alan Douches - mastering
- Justin Borucki - photography
- Don Clark (musician) - art direction, design
- Tom Bejgrowicz - A&R

Additional musicians

- Tony Schreck - keyboards, samples
