= The Mark of the Judas =

Studio album by Darkest Hour
- Released: July 18, 2000
- Recorded: March 2000
- Genre: Melodic death metal, metalcore
- Length: 40:58
- Label: M.I.A. Records, Southern Lord (SUNN21), Join the Team Player Records
- Producer: Brian McTernan

Darkest Hour chronology
The Prophecy Fulfilled (1999)	The Mark of the Judas (2000)	So Sedated, So Secure (2001)

Professional ratings
Review scores
Source	Rating
Allmusic	3/5 stars

The Mark of the Judas is the first full-length album released by American heavy metal band Darkest Hour. Original copies of the album are now rare and out of print, though a fully remastered reissue was eventually released through Sumerian Records on June 15, 2015.

== Track listing ==
No.	Title	Length
1.	"For the Soul of the Savior"	6:01
2.	"A Blessing in Tragedy"	3:07
3.	"The Legacy"	3:42
4.	"Part II"	2:31
5.	"Eclipse"	4:56
6.	"The Mark of the Judas"	4:39
7.	"Escape Artist"	4:19
8.	"Messiah Complex"	4:28
9.	"How the Beautiful Decay"	7:15
Total length:		40:58

== Personnel ==
- John Henry – vocals
- Fred Ziomek – lead guitar
- Mike Schleibaum – rhythm guitar
- Billups Allen – bass
- Ryan Parrish – drums
