= Reject the Sickness =

Reject The Sickness

Studio album by God Forbid
- Released: May 8, 1999
- Recorded: 1998–1999
- Genre: Metalcore, melodic death metal
- Length: 31:25
- Label: 9 Volt Records
- Producer: Steve Evetts

God Forbid chronology
Out of Misery (1998)	Reject The Sickness (1999)	Determination (2001)

Reject the Sickness is the first full-length studio album by the New Jersey heavy metal quintet God Forbid. It was recorded at Trax East Studios in South River, New Jersey, and produced, mixed and engineered by Steve Evetts. Cover art was painted by Matt Kimball. It was re-released in 2001 on We Put Out Records. God Forbid owns the master tapes and thus was able to release it themselves outside of their deal with Century Media Records.

== Track listing ==
All tracks are written by God Forbid.

No.	Title	Length
1.	"Amendment"	3:02
2.	"Reject the Sickness"	3:27
3.	"N2"	3:21
4.	"No Sympathy"	2:36
5.	"Assed Out"	3:58
6.	"Ashes of Humanity (Regret)"	3:51
7.	"Dark Waters"	2:13
8.	"Heartless"	3:42
9.	"Weather the Storm"	3:59
10.	"The Century Fades"	1:20
Total length:		31:25

== Personnel ==
- Byron Davis – lead vocals
- Doc Coyle – lead guitar
- Dallas Coyle – rhythm guitar
- John "Beeker" Outcalt – bass guitar
- Corey Pierce – drums
