= The Misanthrope (EP) =

EP by Darkest Hour
- Released: May 1996
- Recorded: 1996
- Studio: Let's Rain Studio
- Genres: Metalcore; hardcore punk
- Label: Death Truck
- Producer: Howard Pyle

Darkest Hour chronology
The Misanthrope (1996)	The Prophecy Fulfilled (1999)

Professional ratings
Review scores
Source	Rating
Allmusic	1.5/5 stars

The Misanthrope is the debut EP from melodic death metal band Darkest Hour. It was released in 1996 on the defunct label Death Truck Records. It features a more hardcore oriented metalcore sound than their recent works.

== Track listing ==
No.	Title	Length
1.	"Vise"	5:30
2.	"Looking Forward (To the End)"	3:45
3.	"The Misanthrope"	4:17
4.	"Fathom"	5:36
5.	"Keepsake 23"	6:19
6.	"Crossroads"	3:51

== Personnel ==
Darkest Hour

- John Henry – vocals
- Mike Schleibaum – guitars
- Raul Mayorga – bass
- Matt Mabben – drums

Production

- Howard Pyle – producer, mixing
- Matt Letsinger – engineer
