= Hidden Hands of a Sadist Nation =

Studio album by Darkest Hour
- Released: May 20, 2003
- Recorded: January 20 to February 16, 2003
- Studios: Studio Fredman, Gothenburg
- Genres: Melodic death metal; thrash metal
- Length: 56:03
- Label: Victory
- Producers: Fredrik Nordström; Patrick J. Sten

Darkest Hour chronology
So Sedated, So Secure (2001)	Hidden Hands of a Sadist Nation (2003)	Undoing Ruin (2005)

Hidden Hands of a Sadist Nation is the third full-length studio album by American melodic death metal band Darkest Hour. It was released in 2003, and contains nine tracks on the regular release and ten for the Japanese release and the limited edition DVD. "For the Soul of the Savior" includes a solo by Kris Norris which replaces the last part of the original song. It is also the first Darkest Hour album to feature Kris Norris on lead guitar.

Music videos were released for the songs "The Sadist Nation" and "Oklahoma."

== Track listing ==
No.	Title	Length
1.	"The Sadist Nation" (feat. Tomas Lindberg)	5:13
2.	"Pay Phones and Pills"	5:44
3.	"Oklahoma"	4:00
4.	"Marching to the Killing Rhythm"	4:20
5.	"The Misinformation Age" (feat. Anders Björler)	5:41
6.	"Seven Day Lie"	4:46
7.	"Accessible Losses"	8:03
8.	"The Patriot Virus"	5:17
9.	"Veritas, Aequitas" (feat. Peter Wichers & Marcus Sunnesson)	12:57
Total length:		56:03

Japanese bonus track
No.	Title	Length
10.	"For the Soul of the Savior"	6:00
Total length:		62:03

== Reception ==
Professional ratings
Review scores
Source	Rating
Allmusic	1.5/5 stars
Punknews.org	3.5/5 stars

Hidden Hands of a Sadist Nation has received mixed reviews.

Punknews gave the album a favorable review, saying "tt's hard to pinpoint what makes the record work so well; be it the much more prevelant [sic] melodies, the constant experimentation with tempo, the ability to combine such diverse heavy influences coherently, or the reluctance to fall into genre traps, this is an outstanding heavy record and will hopefully be the record to show that clever, original metal can be produced on this side of the Atlantic."

Richie Unterberger of AllMusic gave the album a negative review. Unterberger stated John Henry's vocals "crosses well beyond the bounds of (presumably unconscious) self-parody" and criticized the album's length. The review did have some praise for closing track "Veritas, Aequitas" for its inclusion of piano and acoustic guitar, saying it comes "as nothing less than a total shock after the mayhem of the preceding eight tracks. If it's a joke, it's one the bandmembers should take seriously; they're really underselling themselves if they're capable of playing in a more versatile range of any sort, but elect not to by choice."

== DVD ==
After its release, Victory Records reissued Hidden Hands of a Sadist Nation with a bonus DVD. It includes an alternate music video to "The Sadist Nation," footage from both recording and from their past tours, as well as a bonus video with tour manager Tito Picon.

== Personnel ==
- John Henry – vocals
- Kris Norris – guitar
- Mike Schleibaum – guitar
- Paul Burnette – bass
- Ryan Parrish – drums
