= Undoing Ruin =

Studio album by Darkest Hour
- Released: June 28, 2005
- Recorded: 2005 at Greenhouse Studios in Vancouver, British Columbia
- Genres: Melodic death metal; metalcore
- Length: 37:48
- Label: Victory
- Producer: Devin Townsend

Darkest Hour chronology
Hidden Hands of a Sadist Nation (2003)	Undoing Ruin (2005)	Archives (2006)

Professional ratings
Review scores
Source	Rating
AbsolutePunk	(71%)
AllMusic	3.5/5 stars
Blabbermouth.net	8/10 stars
Punknews.org	5/5 stars

Undoing Ruin is the fourth full-length studio album by melodic death metal/metalcore band Darkest Hour, released on June 28, 2005.

It was the band's first album to enter the Billboard 200 albums chart, debuting at #138. "Convalescence" served as the album's single with a music video that was frequently shown on MTV2's Headbangers Ball.

Darkest Hour released an official DVD in 2017 titled 'Party Scars and Prison Bars Two and a Half: Live' as a bonus bundled with pre-orders of their ninth studio album Godless Prophets & the Migrant Flora of the band playing Undoing Ruin live in its entirety, which was filmed in 2015 to celebrate the tenth anniversary of the album's release. It was only limited to 1100 copies.

== Track listing ==
No.	Title	Length
1.	"With a Thousand Words to Say But One"	4:22
2.	"Convalescence"	4:12
3.	"This Will Outlive Us"	3:48
4.	"Sound the Surrender"	3:41
5.	"Pathos"	1:34
6.	"Low"	3:04
7.	"Ethos"	1:21
8.	"District Divided"	2:28
9.	"These Fevered Times"	3:09
10.	"Paradise"	3:44
11.	"Tranquil"	6:22
Total length:		37:48

== Personnel ==
- John Henry – vocals, additional drums
- Kris Norris – guitar, acoustic guitar
- Mike Schleibaum – guitar
- Paul Burnette – bass
- Ryan Parrish – drums
- David Young – keyboards, piano
