= So Sedated, So Secure =

Studio album by Darkest Hour
- Released: April 24, 2001
- Genre: Melodic death metal, metalcore
- Length: 38:58
- Label: Victory
- Producer: Brian McTernan

Darkest Hour chronology
The Mark of the Judas (2000)	So Sedated, So Secure (2001)	Hidden Hands of a Sadist Nation (2003)

Professional ratings
Review scores
Source	Rating
AllMusic	2/5 stars
Kerrang!	3/5 stars
Punknews.org	3/5 stars
Stylus Magazine	7.5/10

So Sedated, So Secure is the second full-length album from Darkest Hour. The album gained the attention of independent record label Victory Records, who signed them following the success of their debut. The album has since been re-released by Victory (March 7, 2006), featuring re-mixed audio, re-recorded vocals, new tracks, and artwork.

== Track listing ==
All tracks are written by John Henry, Mike Schleibaum, and Ryan Parrish, except where noted.

No.	Title	Length
1.	"An Epitaph"	3:44
2.	"So Sedated, So Secure"	4:09
3.	"The Hollow"	3:27
4.	"Another Reason"	4:32
5.	"No Closer Than a Stranger"	4:50
6.	"A Cold Kiss"	4:16
7.	"Treason in Trust"	5:15
8.	"The Last Dance Massacre"	8:45
Total length:		38:58

Deluxe edition bonus tracks
No.	Title	Writer(s)	Length
9.	"Be Forewarned" (Pentagram cover)	Bobby Liebling, Tony Reed, Scooter Haslip, Henry Vasquez	3:26
10.	"Go Back to the Gym" (Battery cover)	Brian McTernan, Ken Olden	1:43
11.	"Bear Hunting USA"	Kris Norris, Paul Burnette, Henry, Schleibaum, Parrish	4:02
12.	"Polar Bear Hunting USA"	Henry, Norris, Schleibaum, Burnette, Parrish	4:45
13.	"Estebon"	Henry, Norris, Schleibaum, Burnette, Parrish	1:33

== Personnel ==
Darkest Hour

- John Henry – vocals, tambourine (tracks 11 & 12)
- Frederick Ziomek – lead guitar
- Mike Schleibaum – rhythm guitar
- Billups Allen – bass
- Ryan Parrish – drums, piano, additional guitar (tracks 11 & 12)

Additional

- Brian McTernan – production, recording, mixing, keyboards, electronics
- Alan Douches – mastering
