= Thy Will Be Done =

American metalcore band

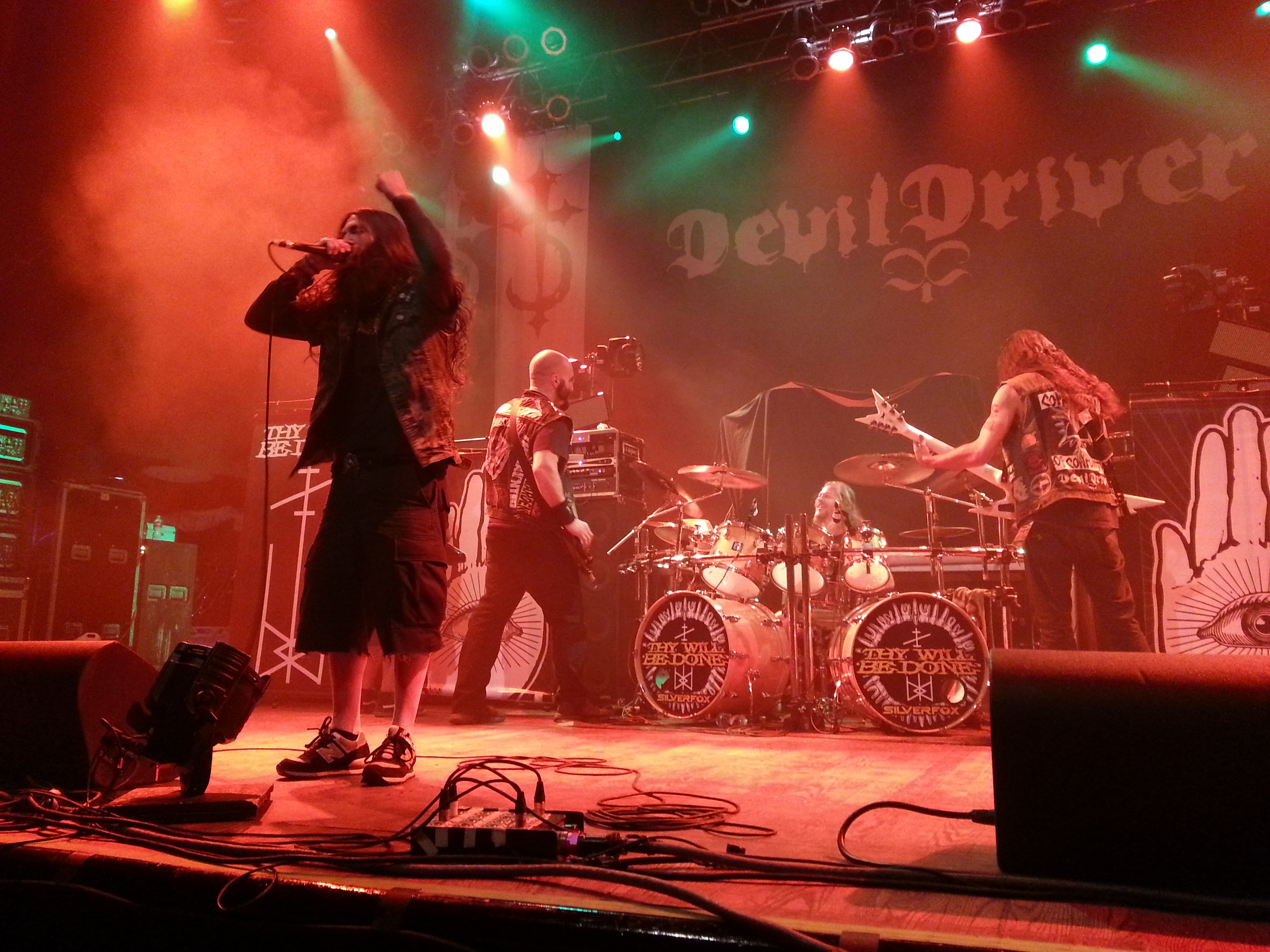
- Thy Will Be Done in 2013

Background information
- Origin: Providence, Rhode Island, U.S.
- Genres: Metalcore, groove metal
- Years active: 2005–present
- Labels: US: Stillborn Records, Eye.On Lion Recordings Japan: Toy's Factory
- Members: J. Costa; Chris Robinson; Kurt Fraunfelter; Jay Waterman; Eric Tavares
- Past members: Chris Cote; Matt Marcel; Chris Drapeau; Brendan Misturado; Rob Gil; Bob Harris
- Website: thywillbedone.net

Thy Will Be Done is an American metalcore band formed in 2005 from Providence, Rhode Island. As of 2024, the ensemble has released three studio albums and one EP. The albums Was and Is to Come (2007) and In Ancient of Days (2009) were released via Stillborn Records. The 2012 EP Temple and 2024 full-length Pillar of Fire were released via Eye.On Lion Recordings. Both Was and Is to Come and Temple reached no. 9 on the Billboard Heatseekers charts. Since the release of Temple, the band has recorded three cover songs: "Emerald" by Thin Lizzy, "March of the Pigs" by Nine Inch Nails, and "Cockroaches" by Nailbomb, as well as released two singles, "Breath of Light" and "Last Ghost to Kill".

== History ==
=== Stillborn Records ===
In September 2007, Thy Will Be Done signed with Stillborn Records and announced that their full-length debut album "Was And Is To Come" would be released on October 23.

The band completed work on the album in early 2007. On October 19, 2007, the band released a single from the album, "Earth's Final Embrace", and announced they would be holding a listening party for the album on October 22 at Club Hell in Providence, Rhode Island.

"Was And Is To Come" was released on October 23, 2007, and was distributed internationally through Caroline Records/EMI. The album featured guest vocals from Jesse Leach of Killswitch Engage, but at that time, of Seemless. The debut was produced, engineered, and mixed by Chris "Zeuss" Harris at Planet Z Studios in Hadley, Massachusetts. Jamey Jasta served as executive producer.

In February 2009, the band completed work on their sophomore full-length album "In Ancient of Days", with a release date expected in early spring. Mixing and engineering was again handled by Chris "Zeuss" Harris, with Jasta again handling executive production duties. Two versions of the album were subsequently released in the US on June 30, 2009; a ten track version for retail, and an eleven track version for Hot Topic, which contained the bonus song, 'Becoming The Way'.

The band would set out on the Thrash And Burn Tour throughout North America in the Summer of 2009 with DevilDriver, Emmure, Despised Icon amongst others, and headed to Europe and the UK with Earth Crisis, Sworn Enemy, Neaera, as part of the Hell On Earth Tour.

In early 2010, the band toured with DevilDriver, Suffocation, and Goatwhore with fill-in bassist Jeff Golden who would later go on to join Crowbar. In Spring/Summer 2010, the band joined All That Remains, Fear Factory, Prong, and Silent Civilian on an east coast tour of the United States. They also performed at the 2011 New England Metal And Hardcore Festival.

=== Temple EP ===
In June 2011, the band began pre-production on a follow-up to In Ancient of Days. In November the band announced they'd completed work on the album, and that the group's own rhythm guitarist Kurt Fraunfelter oversaw the engineering of the release with Zeuss (Whitechapel, Chimaira) handling mixing duties.

In November 2011, the band that they would be headlining the inaugural "Strength Beyond Strength" tribute to the late "Dimebag" Darrell Abbott event on December 8 at the Palladium in Worcester, Massachusetts. Proceeds from the event would be donated to help after-school music programs in the Worcester area.

The first track from the upcoming release, titled "You, The Apathy Divine", premiered exclusively through Revolver on June 21, 2012. The track was released as a digital download on June 26 via iTunes following their performance with Metallica at Orion Music + More, on June 24, 2012.

In late June into July 2012 the group co-headed a tour of Japan with The Aggressive Dogs.

On August 15, 2012, the band announced that their upcoming EP would be titled Temple and would arrive on September 25, to be released independently via their label Eye.On Lion Records. Speaking on their decision to independently-release the EP, the band stated:

“As a band, we've always wanted to preserve our expressions as well as the way they reach the listener. It's important for us to have a fan feel, see, and hear the finished piece as closely to the creative source of energy as possible. Eye.On Lion is a way for us to offer our artistic creations to those who choose to support us and by proxy, excludes a lot of ‘middle-people’.”

In September 2012, the band released another track, titled "The Great Rebuilding", via absolutepunk.net. They also performed at "Stillborn Fest 2012" with Hatebreed, Emmure, and others.

In 2012, the band performed with Metallica at Orion Music + More, as well as Party to the Apocalypse 2012 starring Shadows Fall, God Forbid and Trumpet the Harlot. The band joined Shai Hulud, Altars, and Beyond The Shore to tour the U.S. in spring 2013.

J. Costa and Eric Tavares linked up with members of Anthrax and God Forbid to form a new project named "Lead Pipe Cruelty" in April 2014.

In February 2014, Thy Will Be Done announced they'd finished tracking drums for their upcoming album. Thy Will Be Done announced in June that they'd completed tracking instrumentals, and would begin tracking vocals. But, the band would later explain that they had written and scrapped that entire album. In December 2015, while continuing work on the follow-up to Temple, drummer Jay Waterman, suffered cardiac arrest amidst tracking the band's new album, resulting in a provisional break from performances for the band. Waterman's family launched a GoFundMe to assist with bills related to his recovery.

In November 2016, the band teased new music via their Instagram page, and announced their search for a new lead guitarist.

In early 2017, Thy Will Be Done shared via a YouTube video that guitarist Matt Marcel had joined the band. They also announced a return to live performing, with a show at The Cove Music Hall in Worcester, Massachusetts, and shared that drummer Jay Waterman had been medically cleared to perform again following his cardiac arrest in 2015. The band also released a free download of a previously unreleased track "Breath of Light".

The band toured with regularity in the late 2010s, joining Sworn Enemy for their 15th anniversary tour of the album As Real as It Gets in mid-2018, and a tour of North America with Sick of It All, All Hail the Yeti, and BillyBio in late 2018. These dates marked the band's first major touring efforts in nearly four years (their last being with Byzantine and IKILLYA).

Overcast drummer Jay Fitzgerald filled in for the band's drummer, Jay Waterman, during the band's tour supporting Sworn Enemy on their 'As Real As It Gets' 15th Anniversary run of dates. Jay Waterman had released the statement: "We've known Jay Fitz for a very long time and love him as a person and a player. We knew he could pull it off in such a short amount of time and he did!" Waterman continued, "Sorry that I can't be there but, I can't wait to get out there and ROCK with all of you!"

=== Pillar of Fire ===
On May 25, 2020, the band released its first new single in nearly three years, titled "Last Ghost to Kill". On May 26, 2020, while reporting on the band's new single, MetalSucks, incorrectly reported that drummer Jay Waterman had died.

Nearly four years, later, the band released another single and video for, "Prelude to Apostasy" on April 26, 2024. The band also released their entire back catalogue on streaming platforms on March 30, all of it remastered by George Richter at Edestus Audio.

On June 21, 2024, the band released the single "Encore Abomination".

On July 8, the band released the single "Join or Die". The song begins with a quote from H. L. Mencken's Prejudices First Series.

On August 30, 2024, the band released the single "Echos & Narcissists" and premiered a music video (directed by Chariot of the Black Moth) exclusively via Decibel. Vocalist Jay Costa explained that the song's title was a "nod to the myth of Echo and Narcissus" and that the song "is coming from a perspective where one may see the rise in narcissism, vanity, and seemingly waining work ethic in contemporary society being largely attributed to the influence of social media and AI technologies". It was the band's second music video since "Earth's Final Embrace".

In June 2024, the band announced they would be participating in RPM Fest in the fall.

The band released its first full-length album in 15 years, Pillar of Fire, on September 13, 2024, and announced the return of their original bassist, Eric Tavares.

On March 20, 2025, J.Costa and Eric Tavares' long-time project with friend and audio engineer, George Richter, released their first song and video for their studio project, Piscean Black.

== Lyrical themes ==
Thy Will Be Done has been occasionally described as a "religious band", but they do not have a religious agenda and think that that is mainly a "personal journey".

== Discography ==
=== Studio albums ===
- Was and Is to Come (2007) – US Heatseekers No. 9
- In Ancient of Days (2009)
- Pillar of Fire (2024)

=== EPs ===
- Temple (2012) – US Heatseekers No. 9
