= Pillar of Fire (album) =

Studio album by Thy Will Be Done
- Released: September 13, 2024
- Genres: Metalcore, groove metal
- Length: 34:10
- Labels: Eye.On Lion; KMG Distribution

Thy Will Be Done chronology
Temple (2012)	Pillar of Fire (2024)

Singles from Pillar of Fire
- 1. "Last Ghost to Kill" Released: May 25, 2020; 2. "Prelude to Apostasy" Released: April 26, 2024; 3. "Encore Abomination" Released: June 21, 2024; 4. "Join, or Die" Released: July 4, 2024; 5. "Echoes & Narcissists" Released: August 30, 2024

Pillar of Fire is the third studio album by American heavy metal band Thy Will Be Done. It is the band's first album in 12 years. It is also the band's first album to feature lead guitarist Chris Robinson and bassist Chris Cote. The album was released via the band's own music label Eye.On Lion Recordings, with KMG Distribution handling the world-wide distribution.

The album debuted as the #1 Most Added Album to Heavy Radio via the North American College and Community Radio Chart, concluding the year as the #36 on the Top Heavy Records Chart.

== Background ==
In early 2017, Thy Will Be Done shared via a YouTube video that guitarist Matt Marcel had joined the band. They also announced a return to live performing, with a show at The Cove Music Hall in Worcester, Massachusetts, and shared that drummer Jay Waterman had been medically cleared to perform again following his cardiac arrest in 2015.

The band toured with regularity in the late 2010s, joining Sworn Enemy for their 15th anniversary tour of the album As Real as It Gets in mid-2018, and a tour of North America with Sick of It All, All Hail the Yeti, and BillyBio in late 2018. These dates marked the band's first major touring efforts in nearly four years (their last being with Byzantine and IKILLYA).

On May 25, 2020, the band released its first new single in nearly three years, titled "Last Ghost to Kill." Nearly four years, later, the band released another single, "Prelude to Apostasy" on April 26, 2024. The band also released their entire back catalogue on streaming platforms on March 30 - all of it remastered by George Richter at Edestus Audio.

On June 21, 2024, the band released the single "Encore Abomination."

On July 4, the band released the single "Join or Die." The song begins with a quote from H. L. Mencken's Prejudices First Series.

On August 30, 2024, the band released the single "Echoes & Narcissists" and premiered a music video (directed by Chariot of the Black Moth) exclusively via Decibel. Vocalist J. Costa explained that the song's title was a "nod to the myth of Echo and Narcissus" and that the song "is coming from a perspective where one may see the rise in narcissism, vanity, and seemingly waining work ethic in contemporary society being largely attributed to the influence of social media and AI technologies." It was the band's third music video since 2009's "Earth's Final Embrace."

== Track listing ==
All tracks are written by Thy Will Be Done, except where noted.

Pillar of Fire track listing
No.	Title	Length
1.	"Prelude to Apostasy"	3:10
2.	"Perils of Recursion"	2:31
3.	"Echoes & Narcissists"	3:08
4.	"A Fool to Fall"	3:06
5.	"The Initiates (Of the Flame)"	3:30
6.	"An Eternal Light"	4:43
7.	"Encore Abomination"	2:07
8.	"Truth Won't Hide"	2:37
9.	"Last Ghost to Kill"	2:32
10.	"Join or Die"	2:55
11.	"Eye, the Ascension"	3:51
Total length:		34:10

== Personnel ==
Thy Will Be Done

- J. Costa – vocals
- Chris Robinson – lead guitar
- Kurt Fraunfelter – rhythm guitar
- Chris Cote – bass
- Jay Waterman – drums

Production and recording

- Kurt Fraunfelter – recording, mixing, production
- Chris Robinson – mixing
- J. Costa – executive production
- George Richter - mastering
- Recorded at Purple Reign Studios, Massachusetts
- Mastered at Edestus Audio, Connecticut

Artwork and design

- J. Costa – art direction, design, layout for Eye.On Lion Productions
- Mike D'Antonio - logo
- Marlene Buckley - photography
