= Torche =

Torche or TORCHE may refer to:

- Torche (band), an American metal band
  - Torche (album), a 2005 album by Torche
- Tory Campaign for Homosexual Equality, a British LGBT conservative organization
