= In This Life =

In This Life may refer to:

- In This Life (Collin Raye album), 1992
  - "In This Life" (Collin Raye song), the title song
- Colors (Kirk Whalum album), 1997
- In This Life (Elise Testone album), 2014
- "In This Life" (Delta Goodrem song), 2007
- In This Life, a 1989 album by Thinking Plague
- In This Life, a 2012 album by Chantal Kreviazuk
- "In This Life", 1992 song by Madonna from Erotica
- "In This Life", 1996 song by Israel Kamakawiwoʻole from N Dis Life
- "In This Life", 2002 song by Chantal Kreviazuk from What If It All Means Something
- "In This Life", television series episode of The Walking Dead: World Beyond
- "In This Life", a song by Seemless from the album Seemless, 2005
