= Restarter =

Studio album by Torche
- Released: February 24, 2015
- Recorded: Pinecrust Studio (Miami, Florida)
- Genres: Stoner metal, sludge metal, alternative rock
- Length: 38:11
- Label: Relapse
- Producer: Jonathan Nunez

Torche chronology
Harmonicraft (2012)	Restarter (2015)	Admission (2019)

Restarter is the fourth studio album by the American rock band Torche. The album was released on February 24, 2015, through Relapse Records. Restarter was produced by Jonathan Nunez of Torche and mixed by Converge guitarist Kurt Ballou.

== Promotion and release ==
To promote the release of the album, Relapse worked with the band to create a 16-bit video game called "Torche vs Robots: Annihilation Affair". In the game, players act as one of the members of Torche to destroy the robots which have taken over the city. Fans were invited to upload videos of themselves beating the game—fans demonstrating the fastest time with each band member before the official release of the album would win a prize package including Restarter on vinyl, a Torche T-shirt, two tickets to see the band on tour, and a set of Torche stickers. The initial release on February 6 was limited to desktop only; a mobile version, for iPhone and Android devices, was released February 19.

Restarter began streaming in its entirety on SoundCloud on February 16. The album was officially released on February 24, along with a trailer for the animated "Annihilation Affair" music video, directed by Phil Mucci, which premiered on March 23.

== Critical and commercial reception ==
Professional ratings
Aggregate scores
Source	Rating
Metacritic	(79/100)
Review scores
Source	Rating
Allmusic	4/5 stars
DIY	(3/5)
Exclaim!	(9/10)
Kerrang!	(4/5)
MetalSucks	(4/5)
Pitchfork Media	(7.9/10)
PopMatters	(7/10)
Nefarious Realm	5/5 stars

Restarter garnered generally positive reviews from music critics. Many praised it for "[refining] the doom-pop/melodic hard rock" for which Torche is best known. Songs like "Loose Men" and "Blasted" were celebrated for continuing the tradition of incorporating pop elements into their brand of sludge-tinged hard rock, while the last 4 songs were lauded by many as some of their heaviest - Jon Hasudek called them "the least compromising songs they've ever written."

Some critics complained that the album did not deviate enough from the band's prior work and felt it was too dense, particularly the last 3 tracks. Despite this, many of the mixed-to-negative reviews still appreciated the album - Sarah Jamieson (DIY) gave the album 3 stars, saying it "isn't by any means leaps and bounds from what they've done before" but still manages to "reverberate" with satisfying sludgy weight."

Restarter became Torche's highest charting album, which debuted at number 133 on Billboard's Top 200 albums chart.

== Track listing ==
No.	Title	Length
1.	"Annihilation Affair"	4:18
2.	"Bishop in Arms"	2:06
3.	"Minions"	4:43
4.	"Loose Men"	2:28
5.	"Undone"	1:40
6.	"Blasted"	2:34
7.	"No Servants"	3:47
8.	"Believe It"	4:04
9.	"Barrier Hammer"	3:51
10.	"Restarter"	8:40
Total length:		38:11

Deluxe edition
No.	Title	Length
11.	"Harmonslaught"	4:02
12.	"Rock 'N' Roll Mantasy"	3:38
Total length:		45:51

Deluxe Edition bonus tracks, "Harmonslaught" and "Rock 'N' Roll Mantasy", originally released together as a 7" single in 2012.

== Personnel ==
Band members

- Steve Brooks – lead vocals, rhythm guitar
- Andrew Elstner – lead guitar, backing vocals
- Jonathan Nuñez – bass, violin, keyboards, additional guitars
- Rick Smith – drums

Other personnel

- Jonathan Nuñez – production, recording
- Kurt Ballou – mixing
- Alan Douches – mastering
- Santos – album artwork
