= In Return =

In Return may refer to:

- In Return (Odesza album), released in 2014
- In Return (Torche album), released in 2007
- In Return: Just a Book, a 2016 Indian documentary
