= Was and Is to Come =

Studio album by Thy Will Be Done
- Released: October 23, 2007
- Recorded: October–November 2006
- Studio: Planet Z
- Genre: Metalcore, groove metal
- Length: 36:55
- Label: Stillborn Records (US) Caroline Records/EMI (International)
- Producer: Zeuss

Thy Will Be Done chronology
Was and Is to Come (2007)	In Ancient Of Days (2009)

Was And Is to Come is the debut studio album by American heavy metal band Thy Will Be Done. Released on September 14, 2007, the album charted at #9 on the Billboard Heatseekers charts. The album features a guest vocal appearance by Jesse Leach of Killswitch Engage, but at that time, of Seemless.

== Background ==
In September 2007, Thy Will Be Done signed with Stillborn Records and announced that their full-length debut album "Was And Is To Come" would be released on October 23.

The band posted the song "Earth's Final Embrace" to their MySpace on October 19, 2007. A music video was produced for the track. The video was directed by David Brodsky.

The band hosted a listening party for the record at Club Hell in Providence, Rhode Island on October 22. Footage of the event was aired on HeavyMetalSource.com.

== Track listing ==
No.	Title	Length
1.	"Voice Divides"	3:32
2.	"Cast the Crown"	2:42
3.	"Bloodwitness"	3:17
4.	"In the Name Of..."	3:41
5.	"Reveal Resolution"	4:11
6.	"Earth's Final Embrace"	2:50
7.	"Preserving the Sacred" (featuring Jesse Leach)	2:51
8.	"Threshold of the Spirit"	4:26
9.	"Selfless Portrait"	4:05
10.	"Was and Is, and Is to Come"	5:30
Total length:		36:55

Bonus tracks

- Bridged by Chaos (3:06) (Japan)

== Personnel ==
- J. Costa - Vocals
- Rob Gil - Lead Guitar
- Eric Tavares - Bass
- Kurt Fraunfelter - Rhythm Guitar
- Bob Harris - Drums
