= Songs for Singles =

- Artwork for external "envelope" encasing the album packaging.

EP by Torche
- Released: September 21, 2010
- Recorded: Early 2010 at La Casa Nuñez in Miami, Florida
- Genres: Stoner rock, alternative rock, stoner metal, sludge metal
- Length: 21:47
- Label: Hydra Head (HYH-207)
- Producer: Jonathan Nuñez

Torche chronology
Chapter Ahead Being Fake (2009)	Songs for Singles (2010)	Torche / Part Chimp (2011)

Songs for Singles is an EP by the American rock band Torche. The album was released on September 21, 2010, through Hydra Head Records. It is the first Torche album, and second release after the split single Chapter Ahead Being Fake, to not feature guitarist Juan Montoya.

== Writing and recording ==
Torche was originally planning on writing their third full-length album, and follow up to 2008's Meanderthal, but ended up releasing an EP of songs they were working on as Songs for Singles instead. With little interest in writing another album similar to Meanderthal, they started writing songs that would be more fun to play in a live setting. The group quickly recorded music for about 12 tracks for an album, but struggled to write lyrics and record vocals for the songs. According to bassist Jonathan Nuñez, the music was too "full," and when Torche tried to incorporate vocals, "[...] It was like, 'Whoa.' It was kind of overwhelming a little bit." Guitarist and singer Steve Brooks recorded his vocal tracks about a dozen different ways before settling on a composition that fit well with the music. As a group, they also had to strip the musical parts of the songs down to a more simplified arrangement to fit in the vocal tracks, and due to the lengthy process, decided on releasing a short EP in the interest of time. Originally, some of the songs written during these recording sessions that didn't end up on Songs for Singles were expected to be released on their following studio album. However, Rick Smith later denied this claim. The lyrics for Songs for Singles take on a stream of consciousness narrative perspective, and have been described as dream-like and nonsensical by Brooks. He also commented, "That's why I don't print the lyrics, actually. I don't want anyone overanalyzing every little stupid thing I say."

Songs for Singles is the first album, and second release overall after the song "King Beef" released on Chapter Ahead Being Fake, to not feature second guitarist Juan Montoya. Torche has stated that they write and record faster and more efficiently without Montoya in the band. Nuñez commented, "We always wrote as a group even with Juan in the band... But when we became a three-piece, it was a really productive process. With Me, Rick, and Steve, I think we work fairly quickly, we know what we want, and we know how to get it, and we know when it's right."

Songs for Singles was self-produced by the band members themselves in order to achieve a more raw sound. Nuñez stated that their goal during production was to create "something that connects a little more to what we feel it should sound like, and what it will hopefully sound like live." By this point in the band's career, the only Torche album that was not self-produced was Meanderthal which was recorded with Converge guitarist Kurt Ballou. Retrospectively, after the EP's release, Torche expressed their gratitude for working with a third-party in the studio, and suggested that Songs for Singles may be their final self-produced record. Brooks commented, "It's easier to work with other people sometimes, and we were driving ourselves a little crazy on this one... I think we're gonna do [the next album] with someone else, just to eliminate over-analyzing things and nitpicking little things, and having an outside ear help guide us."

== Release ==
Prior to the release of the EP, the opening track "U.F.O." was previously made available on a free Hydra Head Records downloadable sampler. However, this early version was jokingly contained David Lee Roth's vocal track from Van Halen's 1978 single "Runnin' with the Devil," and was created by Hydra Head without Torche's knowledge. Roth's vocal track was leaked online in 2008, and has since become an Internet meme as various mashups with other famous songs have been posted on the web. The version of "U.F.O." on Songs for Singles doesn't feature Roth's vocals. The song was also released as a stand-alone digital single on August 24, 2010, featuring similar cover art to Songs for Singles. A music video for the single directed by Andrew Cox was released on October 11, 2010.

Songs for Singles was posted in full on the band's MySpace for streaming on the weekend before its official release.

Two previously unreleased songs, "Pow Wow" and "80s Prom Song," recorded during the Songs for Singles sessions, were released as a flexi disc single in Decibel magazine's March 2012 issue.

== Reception ==
=== Critical and commercial reception ===
Professional ratings
Aggregate scores
Source	Rating
Metacritic	(74/100)
Review scores
Source	Rating
Allmusic	4/5 stars
BBC Music	(favorable)
Crawdaddy!	(favorable)
Decibel	(9/10)
Exclaim!	(favorable)
Pitchfork Media	(7.4/10)
PopMatters	(7/10)
Rock Sound	(7/10)
Spin	(8/10)
The A.V. Club	(unfavorable)

Songs for Singles garnered generally positive reviews from music critics. Much praise was given to the album's relatively lengthy final two tracks: "Face the Wall," and "Out Again." Tom Breihan of Pitchfork Media commented that these tracks are where the album "really takes off" and that they "slow down their attack noticeably, letting space and dynamics creep into the guitar-storm." James Greene Jr. of Crawdaddy! described these two songs as the album's "real meat" and continued, "Rolling out like methodic and slow-moving urban assault vehicles, these cuts will probably save Torche's latest EP from the danger of being written off as 'less than essential' by our unwashed critical masses."

Songs for Singles became Torche's first charting album, which peaked at number 38 on Billboard's Top Heatseekers albums chart.

=== Accolades ===
Publication	Country	Accolade	Year	Rank
Exclaim!	Canada	Top 10 Metal Albums of the Year	2010	1
Punknews.org	US	Top 10 EPs of the Year	2010	2 (tie)
Rock Sound	UK	Top 75 Albums of the Year	2010	22

== Track listing ==
1. "U.F.O." – 1:53
2. "Lay Low" – 0:51
3. "Hideaway" – 2:03
4. "Arrowhead" – 2:17
5. "Shine on My Old Ways" – 1:49
6. "Cast into Unknown" – 2:11
7. "Face the Wall" – 4:32
8. "Out Again" – 6:11

== Personnel ==
Torche

- Steve Brooks – guitars, vocals
- Jonathan Nuñez – bass
- Rick Smith – drums

Production and recording

- Rob Gonnella – mastering
- Ryan Haft – assistant engineering
- Jonathan Nuñez – drum engineering, production, mixing
- Nicholas Zampiello – mastering

Artwork and design

- Howard Maxwell Johnston – photography
- James OMara – layout
- Torche – artwork
