= Temple (EP) =

EP by Thy Will Be Done
- Released: September 25, 2012
- Studio: 400 Euro
- Genre: Metalcore; groove metal
- Length: 19:57
- Label: Eye.On Lion Recordings

Thy Will Be Done chronology
| In Ancient of Days (2009) | Temple (2012) | Pillar of Fire (2024) |

Singles from Temple
- 1. "You, The Apathy Divine" Released: June 26, 2012; 2. "The Great Rebuilding" Released: September 12, 2012

Temple is the first extended play by American heavy metal band Thy Will Be Done. It is the band's first release on their own Eye.On Lion Recordings. The EP peaked at #9 on the Billboard Heatseekers charts. The album was voted Revolver Magazine's "Album of the Week" upon its debut.

== Background ==
In June 2011, the band began pre-production on a follow-up to their 2009 album In Ancient of Days. In November the band announced they'd completed work on the album, and that The groups own rhythm guitarist Kurt Fraunfelter oversaw the engineering of the release with Zeuss (Whitechapel, Chimaira) handling mixing duties at Planet Z Studios in Hadley, Massachusetts.

In November 2011, the band that they would be headlining the inaugural "Strength Beyond Strength" tribute to the late "Dimebag" Darrell Abbottevent on December 8 at the Palladium in Worcester, Massachusetts. Proceeds from the event would be donated to help after-school music programs in the Worcester area.

The first track from the upcoming release, titled "You, The Apathy Divine," premiered exclusively through Revolver on June 21, 2012. The track was released as a digital download on June 26 via iTunes following their performance with Metallica at Orion Music + More, on June 24, 2012. "You, The Apathy Divine" climbed steadily on SiriusXM Liquid Metal's weekly Top 12 countdown "The Devil's Dozen," eventually hitting the #1 position for 4 straight weeks. The single remained a top requested song for 20+ weeks, and listeners ultimately voted it as one of the top 12 most requested songs for 2012.

In late June and into July 2012 the group co-headed a tour of Japan with The Aggressive Dogs.

On August 15, 2012, the band announced that their upcoming EP would be titled Temple and would arrive on September 25, to be released independently via their label Eye.On Lion Records. Speaking on their decision to independently-release the EP, the band stated:

“As a band, we’ve always wanted to preserve our expressions as well as the way they reach the listener. It’s important for us to have a fan feel, see, and hear the finished piece as closely to the creative source of energy as possible. Eye.On Lion is a way for us to offer our artistic creations to those who choose to support us and by proxy, excludes a lot of ‘middle-people’.”

In September 2012, the band released another track, titled "The Great Rebuilding," via absolutepunk.net. They also performed at "Stillborn Fest 2012" with Hatebreed, Emmure, and others.

In 2012, the band performed with Metallica at Orion Music + More, as well as Party to the Apocalypse 2012 starring Shadows Fall, God Forbid and Trumpet the Harlot. The band joined Shai Hulud, Altars, and Beyond The Shore to tour the U.S. in spring 2013.

== Track listing ==
All tracks are written by Thy Will Be Done, except where noted.

Temple track listing
| No. | Title | Length |
|---|---|---|
| 1. | "Liturgy (Jachin)" | 1:57 |
| 2. | "In the Ways of the Old" | 3:27 |
| 3. | "The Great Rebuilding" | 3:15 |
| 4. | "You, the Apathy Divine" | 3:55 |
| 5. | "A Lion and a Lamb" | 3:56 |
| 6. | "Epiphany (Boaz)" | 3:27 |
| Total length: | | 19:57 |

== Personnel ==
Thy Will Be Done

- J. Costa – vocals
- Chris Drapeau – electric guitar
- Kurt Fraunfelter – electric guitar
- Brendan Misturado – bass
- Jay Waterman – drums

== Charts ==
Chart performance for Temple
| Chart (2012) | Peak position |
|---|---|
| Heatseekers Albums (Billboard) | 9 |
