= The Beginning of the End (Sworn Enemy album) =

Studio album by Sworn Enemy
- Released: January 24, 2006
- Genre: Beatdown hardcore, crossover thrash
- Length: 48:57
- Label: Abacus
- Producer: Jamey Jasta

Sworn Enemy chronology
As Real as It Gets (2003)	The Beginning of the End (2006)	Maniacal (2008)

The Beginning of the End is the second full-length studio album by the crossover thrash band, Sworn Enemy, released on Abacus Recordings on January 24, 2006. It was produced by Jamey Jasta of Hatebreed. There is a hidden track at the end of "Weight of the World".

== Track listing ==
No.	Title	Length
1.	"Forgotten"	2:44
2.	"Scared of the Unknown"	3:40
3.	"The Beginning of the End"	3:20
4.	"Save Your Breath"	4:05
5.	"Absorb the Lies"	3:16
6.	"All I Have"	3:37
7.	"We Hate"	2:57
8.	"No Second Chances"	2:09
9.	"After the Fall" (featuring Tim Lambesis of As I Lay Dying on vocals)	2:53
10.	"Here Today"	3:43
11.	"Weight of the World"	16:49
Total length:		48:57

== Personnel ==
- Sal Lococo - vocals
- Lorenzo Antonucci - guitar
- Jamin Hunt - bass guitar
- Paul Antignani - drums
