= Living on Borrowed Time =

Studio album by Sworn Enemy
- Released: May 13, 2014
- Genre: Crossover thrash
- Length: 35:04
- Label: Rock Ridge Music
- Producer: Anthony Paganini

Sworn Enemy chronology
Total World Domination (2009)	Living on Borrowed Time (2014)	Gamechanger (2019)

Living on Borrowed Time is the fifth full-length studio album by American crossover thrash band Sworn Enemy. The album was released in the United States on May 13, 2014.

== Track listing ==
1. Do or Die - 3:23
2. Hard Way - 2:00
3. Broken Hope - 3:23
4. Slipping Away - 3:16
5. No Apologies - 3:14
6. One Eye Open - 3:33
7. No Mercy - 3:41
8. Never Forget - 3:23
9. Stand and Deliver - 3:18
10. Nothing Changes - 2:58
11. Rise Above - 3:01

== Charts ==
Chart (2014)	Peak position
US Heatseekers Albums	8
US Hard Rock Albums	20

== Credits ==
- Sal Lococo - vocals
- Jeff Cummings - guitar
- Matt Garzilli - guitar
- Mike Pucciarelli - bass
- Danny Lamagna - drums
