= Healer / Across the Shields =

EP by Torche
- Released: March 13, 2009
- Genres: Stoner metal, sludge metal
- Length: 10:28
- Label: Hydra Head

Torche chronology
Meanderthal (2008)	Healer / Across the Shields (2009)	Chapter Ahead Being Fake (2009)

Healer / Across the Shields is an EP by Miami-based band Torche. It was released as a 12″ vinyl with a DVD containing music videos for "Healer" and "Across the Shields". The vinyl was colored either black, orange, or purple. Side A consists of two tracks from Torche's previous release, Meanderthal, while side B contains two tracks that are exclusive to this EP.

This was the last Torche release that involved former guitarist Juan Montoya.

== Track listing ==
Side A
No.	Title	Length
1.	"Healer"	2:07
2.	"Across the Shields"	3:03

Side B
No.	Title	Length
3.	"Mash It Up"	2:13
4.	"Sugar Glider"	3:05
Total length:		10:28

== Personnel ==
- Steve Brooks – vocals, rhythm guitar
- Juan Montoya – lead guitar
- Jonathan Nuñez – bass
- Rick Smith – drums
