= Chapter Ahead Being Fake =

- Cover art for Japanese version

EP (split) by Torche and Boris
- Released: August 19, 2009
- Labels: Daymare; Hydra Head Records (HYH-186)
- Producers: Jonathan Nuñez, Boris

Torche chronology
Healer / Across the Shields (2009)	Chapter Ahead Being Fake (2009)	Songs for Singles (2010)

Boris chronology
Smile Live in Prague (2009)	Chapter Ahead Being Fake (2009)	Golden Dance Classics (2009)

Alternative cover
- Cover art for North American version.

Chapter Ahead Being Fake is a split album featuring songs from Japanese band Boris and American band Torche. The album was released on August 19, 2009 in Japan through Daymare Records on CD, the same day Boris's split album with 9dw, Golden Dance Classics, was released. This is the first release from Torche as a three-piece band after parting ways with second guitarist Juan Montoya in 2008. A video for Torche's "King Beef" was released on January 5, 2010.

Chapter Ahead Being Fake was released on 10" vinyl in North America through Hydra Head Records on July 13, 2010 with alternative cover art. The American release was intended to be released on the same day as the Japanese release, but Daymare began selling the album without Hydra Head's knowledge. After finding out about the Japanese release, and realizing that Torche's song "King Beef" was already widely available illegally on the internet, Hydra Head was not in a rush to make the physical EP available in the US.

An alternate, shorter mix of "Luna" is available on the international version of New Album.

== Track listing ==
1. Torche – "King Beef"
2. Boris – "Luna"

== Personnel ==
=== Torche ===
Band

- Steve Brooks – guitars, vocals
- Jonathan Nuñez – bass
- Rick Smith - drums, percussion

Production

- Jonathan Nuñez – recording, mixing, production, sound manipulation
- Nick Zampiello – mastering
- Ryan Haft – assistant engineer

=== Boris ===
Band

- Takeshi – vocals, guitars, bass
- Wata – guitars
- Atsuo – drums, percussion

Production

- "FangsAnalSatan" – recording
- Boris – production
- Soulchira Nakuimura – mixing, mastering
