= Torche / Part Chimp =

EP (split) by Torche and Part Chimp
- Released: November 5, 2011
- Genre: Stoner metal, sludge metal
- Length: 18:17
- Label: Chunklet

Torche chronology
Songs for Singles (2010)	Torche / Part Chimp (2011)	Harmonicraft (2012)

Part Chimp chronology
Thriller (2009)	Torche / Part Chimp (2011)

Alternative cover
- Cover for Part Chimp's side of the vinyl packaging. Artwork designed by sci-fi artist Trevor Claxton.

Professional ratings
Review scores
Source	Rating
Alternative Press	3/5 stars
Rock Sound	(8/10)

Torche / Part Chimp is a split EP between the American metal band Torche and British rock band Part Chimp. The album was released on November 5, 2011, through Chunklet Industries—a date which coincided with a tour of the eastern United States featuring both bands. The vinyl edition of the album was limited to 500 copies. Torche's side of the record features three cover songs of the American indie rock band Guided by Voices, and Part Chimp's side features two newly recorded songs. Part Chimp's songs are also some of the final tracks they recorded before disbanding.

The split EP received average to positive reviews from music critics. Jason Heller of Alternative Press praised Torche's choice to cover three Guided by Voices songs, and noted that the two artists are, "surprisingly sympathetic pop titans separated only by volume and age." However, Heller said that Part Chimp's songs, "simply don't measure up to the stellar (and likely once-in-a-lifetime) pairing of Torche and GBV." Pete Withers of Rock Sound said "the whole thing kicks arse on a major scale." Withers said that Part Chimp's songs were a "fitting send-off for one of the past decade's loudest scuzziest bands," and that Torche's covers proved that the group's "fuzzed-out melodic muscle continues to be grossly underestimated."

== Track listing ==
Side A: Torche

1. "Exit Flagger" (originally written by Guided by Voices) – 2:30
2. "Postal Blowfish" (originally written by Guided by Voices) – 2:27
3. "Unleashed! The Large Hearted Boy" (originally written by Guided by Voices) – 2:05

Side B: Part Chimp

1. "Dr. Horse" – 5:10
2. "The Watcher" – 6:05
