= Orion Music + More =

Music festival (2012–2013)

- Genre: Extreme metal, heavy metal, hard rock, rock, hardcore punk, indie rock, alternative rock, punk rock, experimental music.
- Dates: June 23–24, 2012 & June 8–9, 2013
- Years active: 2012–2013
- Website: www.orionmusicandmore.com

The Orion Music + More was a touring music festival created by American thrash metal/heavy metal band Metallica. On February 7, 2012, the band announced plans to launch the festival, which took place at Bader Field in Atlantic City on June 23 and 24, 2012. The second installment took place at Belle Isle in Detroit, Michigan, on June 8 and 9, 2013. The festival was a financial disaster, which led to its cancellation after only two installments.

== 2013 ==
It was announced that Belle Isle would be the site of the Orion Music + More Festival in 2013. On December 26, 2012, Detroit Councilman Ken Cockrel Jr. confirmed rumors that the city is in the process of confirming 2014 and 2015 as well to take place at Belle Isle. However, on December 2, 2013, it was announced that Metallica would be "taking a year off" from the festival in 2014. Every year, Metallica brings many bands and artists from many different genres to play at the Orion. In addition to the musical features, Orion Music and More had numerous additional attractions, including: "Custom Car + Motorcycle Show", Ulrich's speech at "Hit The Lights Films", Kirk's Crypt which contains his huge horror collection and the "Metallica Museum" (which featured classic Metallica guitars) among others.

=== 2013 lineup ===
Thirty-eight bands and artists performed at the festival. Bands from a wide variety of genres, ranging from thrash metal and black metal, even to punk, indie, moombahton, dubstep, bass music and experimental rock, played throughout the weekend. Metallica did a surprise performance at the Damage Inc. Stage as Dehaan and played the entire Kill 'Em All album. The following evening they played different set-list, including songs such as "Carpe Diem Baby" and "I Disappear" among Sunday's rarities. Aside from their performances, The Chili Peppers closed Saturday night's lineup in drummer Chad Smith's home town with an hour and 45 minutes of mostly hits including a frenetic rendition of Stevie Wonder's "Higher Ground."

==== Budweiser Orion Stage ====
Sat June 8	Sun June 9
Red Hot Chili Peppers; Rise Against; Dropkick Murphys; The Bronx	Metallica; Deftones; The Joy Formidable (The Joy Formidable was scheduled but did not make the show, citing "travel issues"); All Shall Perish

==== Fuel Stage ====
Sat June 8	Sun June 9
Infectious Grooves; Tomahawk; Foals	Gogol Bordello; Japandroids; The Dillinger Escape Plan

==== Damage Inc. Stage + Van's Vert Ramp ====
Sat June 8	Sun June 9
FLAG; dehaan (Metallica's secret stage name); Dead Sara; The Orwells	Cauldron; Death; Fu Manchu; Trujillo Trio; FIDLAR

==== Frantic Stage ====
Sat June 8	Sun June 9
Silversun Pickups; Death Grips; Battlecross	Rocket From The Crypt; Vista Chino; The Dirtbombs; Shuli Egar

==== Sanitarium Stage ====
Sat June 8	Sun June 9
Bassnectar; Dillon Francis; Borgore; Dirtyphonics; Matt Clarke	Destroid (Excision + Downlink + KJ Sawka (Drummer of Pendulum)); Datsik; Adventure Club; 12th Planet; Calico

== 2012 ==
In 2012, the first Orion festival was held at Atlantic City. According to Press of Atlantic City, Metallica's Orion Music + More Festival sold 23,571 for shows June 23 and 24.

=== 2012 lineup ===
37 bands and artists performed at the festival. Bands from a wide variety of genres, ranging from thrash metal and black metal, even to punk, indie, and experimental rock, played throughout the weekend. Members of Metallica introduced some of the bands performing, including Suicidal Tendencies, where Robert Trujillo was their bassist from 1989 to their breakup in 1995. Metallica headlined the festival on both days and performed two of their most critically acclaimed albums in their entirety (in reverse order): their 1984 album Ride the Lightning on the Saturday night, and their 1991 eponymous fifth release on the Sunday night.

==== Orion Stage ====
Sat June 23	Sun June 24
Metallica (Ride the Lightning); Modest Mouse; The Gaslight Anthem; Lucero; Baroness	Metallica (The Black Album); Eric Church; Best Coast; Ghost

==== Fuel Stage ====
Sat June 23	Sun June 24
Arctic Monkeys; Cage the Elephant; Fucked Up; The Sword	Avenged Sevenfold; Volbeat; Gary Clark Jr.; A Place to Bury Strangers

==== Damage Inc. Stage ====
Sat June 23	Sun June 24
Suicidal Tendencies; Red Fang; Kyng; Letlive; Black Tusk	Sepultura; The Black Dahlia Murder; Torche; Landmine Marathon; Thy Will Be Done

==== Frantic Stage ====
Sat June 23	Sun June 24
Hot Snakes; Jim Florentine; Jim Breuer Heavy Metal Comedy Tour; Don Jamieson; Roky Erickson; Wooden Shjips	Titus Andronicus; Charred Walls of the Damned; Jim Breuer Heavy Metal Comedy Tour; Shuli Egar; Soul Rebels; The Black Angels; Liturgy
