= Total World Domination =

Studio album by Sworn Enemy
- Released: June 16, 2009
- Genre: Crossover thrash
- Length: 35:34
- Label: Century Media
- Producer: Tim Lambesis

Sworn Enemy chronology
Maniacal (2007)	Total World Domination (2009)	Living on Borrowed Time (2014)

Total World Domination is the fourth full-length studio album by the New York crossover thrash band, Sworn Enemy. The album was released in the United States on June 16, 2009.

The album was rated 3.5 out of 5 stars by AllMusic.

== Track listing ==
1. Sell My Soul - 3:24
2. Aftermath - 4:02
3. Run for Shelter - 3:37
4. Still Hating - 2:54
5. On the Outside - 3:08
6. Lies - 2:48
7. Ready to Fight - 3:19
8. Disconnect - 2:58
9. Step Into the Ring - 3:44
10. Home of the Brave - 3:09

== Credits ==
- Sal Lococo - vocals
- Lorenzo Antonucci - guitar
- Jamin Hunt - guitar
- Sid Awesome - bass guitar
- Jerad Buckwalter - drums
- Dave Quiggle - artwork
