= Negative Outlook =

EP by Sworn Enemy
- Released: Original: 2001; Re-release: July 27, 2004
- Genre: Hardcore punk
- Length: 22:25
- Label: Stillborn Records

Sworn Enemy chronology
| Negative Outlook (2001) | Integrity Defines Strength (2002) |

Negative Outlook is an EP by Sworn Enemy, released in 2001 on Stillborn Records. It was re-released in 2004.

== Track listing ==
| No. | Title | Length |
|---|---|---|
| 1. | "New Breed"" | 3:25 |
| 2. | "Never" | 3:45 |
| 3. | "I.D.S." | 4:11 |
| 4. | "Pain" | 4:04 |
| 5. | "Disbelief" | 3:21 |
| 6. | "Last Rites" | 3:39 |
| Total length: | | 22:25 |

== Personnel ==
- Sal Lococo - vocals
- Lorenzo Antonucci - guitar
- Mike Raffinello - guitar
- Jimmy Sagos - bass guitar
- Paul Wallmaker - drums
