= Admission (album) =

Studio album by Torche
- Released: July 12, 2019
- Genres: Stoner metal; sludge metal; shoegaze
- Length: 36:00
- Label: Relapse
- Producer: Jonathan Nuñez

Torche chronology
Restarter (2015)	Admission (2019)

Singles from All Nerve
- 1. "Slide" Released: May 14, 2019

Admission is the fifth studio album by American metal band Torche, released on July 12, 2019, through Relapse Records. This is the band's first material since their previous album Restarter, released in 2015. The album was produced, engineered and mixed by longtime bassist Jonathan Nuñez and is the first to feature Eric Hernandez on bass guitar after former guitarist Andrew Elstner's departure in November 2016. Admission was well received by music critics and scored 80/100 on Metacritic.

== Lineup changes ==
After returning from a tour in November 2016 Andrew Elstner was asked to leave the band, possibly due to "differences of opinions" he noted in a May 2018 interview with Outlaws of the Sun's Steve Howe. "...to clarify 'leaving' was not my choice. Was a surprise for sure, but hindsight... it makes more sense man. Shame on me for forgetting how potentially tenuous my position was in the band and not making sure, as much as possible, that everything was cool. But ultimately no hard feelings man".

Instead of searching for a new guitarist at the beginning of 2017, the band opted instead to find a new bass guitarist with longtime bassist Nuñez taking over guitar duties in the void left after Elstner's departure. Given that this was almost new territory for the recently appointed guitarist, Nuñez had the following to say in an interview with Dan Almasy of Miami New Times "Switching to guitar was almost like starting over, and there’s a lot that went into getting a sound that I was happy with and finding instruments that I was comfortable on having played bass in the band for all but these last couple years. It was still a little strange, a little alien at first, but now it’s feeling great." Nuñez had 9 days to practice playing the instrument before finishing their European tour and starting a full U.S. tour.

In early 2017 the band revealed that they had recruited Eric Hernandez of Miami noise rock band Wrong as their new bassist. Hernandez had drummed for the band previously while filling in for current drummer Rick Smith who had been experiencing some health issues.

== Background and release ==
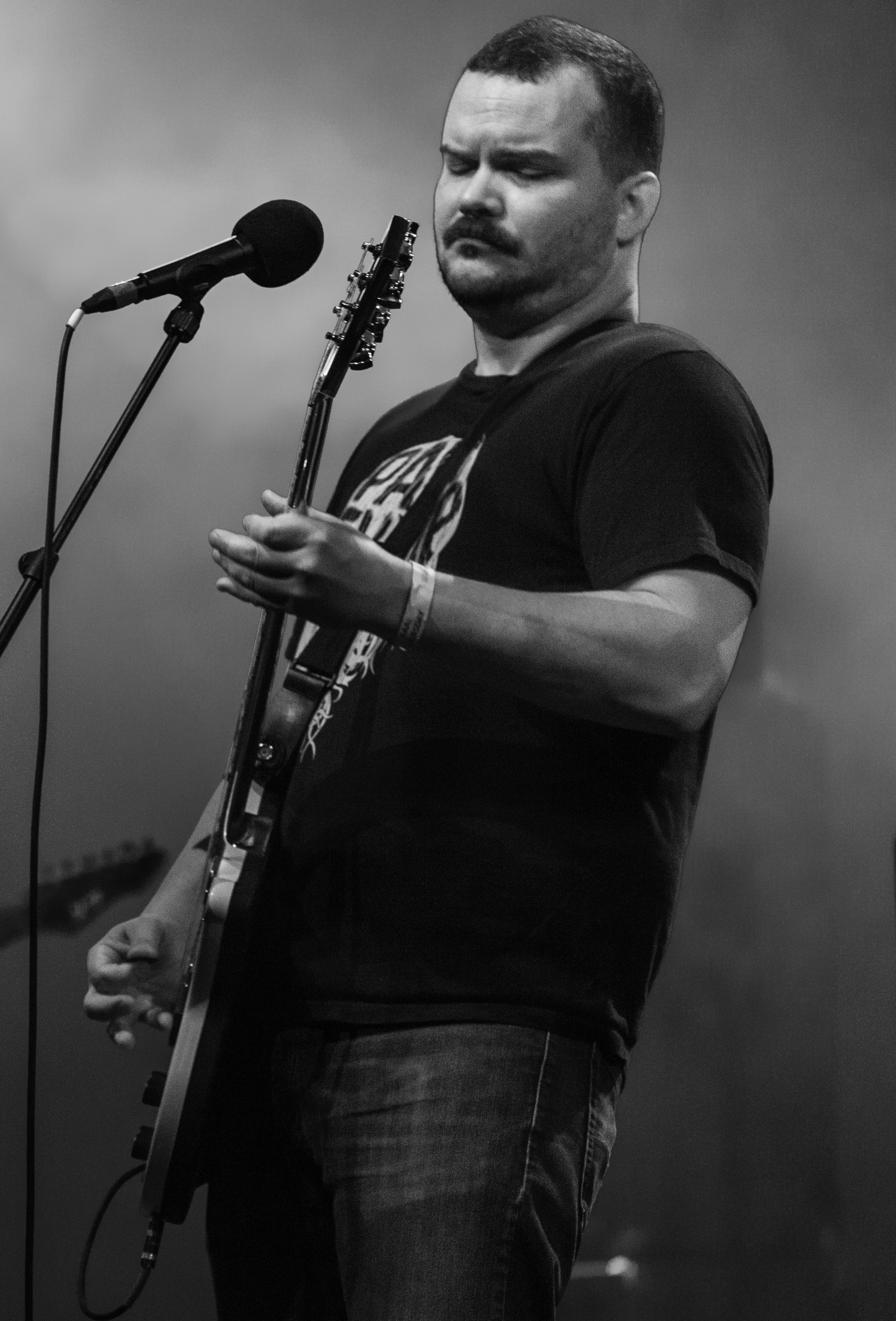
Steve Brooks

During a July 2019 feature interview with Chris Steffen of AllMusic principal songwriter, vocalist and guitarist Steve Brookes touched on writing lyrics for the album stating that he absolutely hated writing them. "Back in the 90s, a lot of my songs didn't even have lyrics, I'd just hum melodies or yell or something, improvised. I'd be like, "Well, I don't know what I'm saying here, but I'm going to basically say what I'm saying on this recording again," even though it's not a word, you just try to make words out of it in some ways. But I'm more of a melody maker. If there's something meaningful to me, I'll put it in, but most of the time I'm just playing with syllables".

On May 14, 2019, four and a half years after the release of their previous album Restarter, the band released the song Slide as the lead single while announcing Admission's release. The song was written by new member Hernandez when he joined Torche and drummer Smith had the following to say about the bassist "Slide is one of the first songs Eric came to the table with, fully realized and arranged, Eric is a total beast of a songwriter. I suggested he uses the first three Gary Numan records as inspiration and he came back at us with some melodically sound material that nailed the Torche vibe."

== Critical reception ==
Professional ratings
Aggregate scores
Source	Rating
Metacritic	(80/100)
Review scores
Source	Rating
Allmusic	4/5 stars
Consequence of Sound	(B)
Exclaim!	8/10
Kerrang!	8/10 stars
MetalSucks	4/5 stars
Pitchfork	6.4/10
Popmatters	8/10 stars
Sputnikmusic	4.4/5

Admission was met with generally favorable reviews scoring 80/100 on aggregate website Metacritic based on 13 critics. In his review for AllMusic James Christopher Monger gave the album 4 out of 5 stars and said "Combining combustive beats and face-melting blasts of doom, sludge, and stoner metal-worthy riffs with soaring, shoegazey melodies, Admission feels both punitive and uplifting; it's a stentorian call to arms that uses the sonic template set forth by bands like Earth and Sunn 0))), but tempers the acrid smoke and hellfire with clarion blasts of icy blue water".

Giving the album a B rating in his review for Consequence of Sound, Langdon Hickman wrote in his final verdict "Admission has a handful of tracks that feel destined to stay deeply lodged in their setlist to come and, at its best, represent some of the brightest and most compelling songs the group has put to tape. Admission isn’t their greatest album, but its new ideas are more than worth the price of entry". In awarding the album a "superb" rating, SputnikMusic staff writer Simon noted "Admission sits comfortably at full throttle and rarely wastes a moment of your time. There’s little to fault here in all honesty; it plays everything right and does so with a near flawless execution. This is an excellent return to form that should please current fans, but I wouldn’t argue with it being a great place to start for first-time listeners of the band as well".

In a more critical review of the album Pitchfork's Zach Schonfeld mentioned the album's incorporating elements of shoegaze and dream pop to mixed success. "...for the most part, Admission doesn't amount to Torche's most compelling songwriting, especially when you consider the four-and-a-half-year wait between albums. Pop-metal, stoner rock, doom metal—whatever amalgam of buzzwords you favor, on Admission, Torche remain a reliable supplier of grizzled riffs to test the low end on your stereo."

== Track listing ==
No.	Title	Length
1.	"From Here"	1:38
2.	"Submission"	2:59
3.	"Slide"	2:52
4.	"What Was"	1:29
5.	"Times Missing"	5:04
6.	"Admission"	4:00
7.	"Reminder"	2:58
8.	"Extremes of Consciousness"	2:58
9.	"On the Wire"	3:18
10.	"Infierno"	3:31
11.	"Changes Come"	5:13
Total length:		36:00

== Personnel ==
Band members

- Steve Brooks – vocals, rhythm guitar
- Jonathan Nuñez – lead guitar
- Eric Hernandez – bass
- Rick Smith – drums

Other personnel

- Jonathan Nuñez - producing, engineering, mixing
- Brad Boatright - mastering
- Richard Vergez – album artwork
- Jacob Speis – album artwork layout
