= Maniacal (album) =

Studio album by Sworn Enemy
- Released: November 17, 2007
- Recorded: 2007
- Genre: Crossover thrash
- Length: 34:20
- Label: Century Media

Sworn Enemy chronology
| The Beginning of the End (2006) | Maniacal (2007) | Total World Domination (2009) |

Maniacal is the third full-length studio album by the New York City crossover thrash band, Sworn Enemy. The album was released in the United States in 2007.

== Track listing ==
1. "Ignorance" – 2:43
2. "Time to Rage" – 2:21
3. "A Place of Solace" – 4:14
4. "Weather the Storm" – 3:41
5. "Destroyer" – 2:58
6. "The American Way" – 3:17
7. "Fear of Failure" – 3:19
8. "No End to This Nightmare" - 3:18
9. "Talk Is Cheap" – 2:59
10. "Said and Done" – 5:24

== Credits ==
- Sal Lococo – vocals
- Lorenzo Antonucci – guitar
- Jamin Hunt – guitar
- Sid Awesome – bass guitar
- Jordan Mancino – drums
