= Integrity Defines Strength =

EP by Sworn Enemy
- Released: Original: 2002; Re-release: July 27, 2004
- Genre: Crossover thrash
- Length: 37:10
- Label: Stillborn Records

Sworn Enemy chronology
Negative Outlook (2001)	Integrity Defines Strength (2002)	As Real as It Gets (2003)

Integrity Defines Strength, is the second EP by Sworn Enemy, released on Stillborn Records in 2002. It was re-released in 2004.

== Track listing ==
No.	Title	Length
1.	"My Misery"	2:27
2.	"These Tears"	4:04
3.	"S.O.B."	3:52
4.	"Never" (Live)	3:56
5.	"New Breed" (Live)	3:32
6.	"My Misery" (Live)	2:32
7.	"Last Rites" (Live)	3:16
8.	"These Tears" (Live)	3:52
9.	"Disbelief" (Live)	3:22
10.	"I.D.S." (Live)	6:17
Total length:		37:10

== Personnel ==
- Sal Lococo- vocals
- Lorenzo Antonucci - guitar
- Mike Raffinello - guitar
- Mike Couls - bass guitar
- Timmy Mycek - drums
