= Harmonicraft =

Studio album by Torche
- Released: April 24, 2012
- Recorded: Pinecrust Studio (Miami, Florida)
- Genres: Stoner rock, stoner metal, alternative rock, sludge metal
- Length: 38:43
- Label: Volcom Entertainment
- Producer: Torche

Torche chronology
Torche / Part Chimp (2011)	Harmonicraft (2012)	Restarter (2015)

Harmonicraft is the third studio album by American rock band Torche. It was released in 2012 on Volcom Entertainment. Harmonicraft was self-produced by Torche and mixed by Converge guitarist Kurt Ballou.

== Reception ==
Professional ratings
Aggregate scores
Source	Rating
Metacritic	83/100
Review scores
Source	Rating
AllMusic	5/5 stars
Alternative Press	4/5 stars
The A.V. Club	A−
Drowned in Sound	8/10
Kerrang!	4/5 stars
Metal Hammer	4.5/5 stars
Pitchfork	6.5/10
PopMatters	8/10
Spin	9/10
Sputnikmusic	4.5/5

The album was listed 30th on Stereogum's list of top 50 albums of 2012.

== Track listing ==
No.	Title	Length
1.	"Letting Go"	2:03
2.	"Kicking"	2:35
3.	"Walk It Off"	1:25
4.	"Reverse Inverted"	3:50
5.	"In Pieces"	3:09
6.	"Snakes Are Charmed"	3:14
7.	"Sky Trials"	1:18
8.	"Roaming"	3:20
9.	"Skin Moth"	3:18
10.	"Kiss Me Dudely"	1:48
11.	"Solitary Traveler"	2:48
12.	"Harmonicraft" (instrumental)	3:15
13.	"Looking On"	6:40

== Personnel ==
Band members

- Steve Brooks – lead vocals, rhythm guitar
- Andrew Elstner – lead guitar, backing vocals
- Jonathan Nuñez – bass, keyboards, additional guitars
- Rick Smith – drums

Other personnel

- Jonathan Nuñez – production, recording
- Kurt Ballou – mixing
- Alan Douches – mastering
- Santos – album artwork
