= Meanderthal =

Studio album by Torche
- Released: April 8, 2008
- Recorded: October 2007
- Genres: Stoner metal, sludge metal
- Length: 36:13
- Labels: Hydra Head Records; Daymare Recordings
- Producers: Kurt Ballou & Torche

Torche chronology
In Return (2007)	Meanderthal (2008)	Healer / Across the Shields (2009)

Meanderthal is the second full-length studio album by American heavy metal band Torche. It was released on April 8, 2008.

== Reception ==
Professional ratings
Review scores
Source	Rating
AllMusic	4.5/5 stars
AbsolutePunk.net	(91%)
Pitchfork Media	(8.2/10)
Sputnikmusic	4/5 stars
SPIN	4/5 stars
Thrash Hits	5.5/6 stars

In the January 2009 issue of Decibel Magazine, Meanderthal was ranked number 1 atop the list of the Top 40 Extreme Albums of 2008.

== Track listing ==
No.	Title	Length
1.	"Triumph of Venus"	1:44
2.	"Grenades"	2:53
3.	"Piraña"	1:32
4.	"Sandstorm"	2:19
5.	"Speed of the Nail"	1:41
6.	"Healer"	2:07
7.	"Across the Shields"	3:03
8.	"Sundown"	3:17
9.	"Little Champion"	0:34
10.	"Without a Sound"	2:06
11.	"Fat Waves"	4:32
12.	"Amnesian"	6:25
13.	"Meanderthal"	4:00
Total length:		36:13

The Daymare Recordings release of the album includes the entire In Return EP as bonus tracks.

== Personnel ==
Band members

- Steve Brooks – vocals, rhythm guitar
- Juan Montoya – lead guitar
- Jonathan Nuñez – bass
- Rick Smith – drums

Other personnel

- Kurt Ballou – production, recording, engineering, mixing and additional guitars
- Aaron Turner – cover artwork
- Nick Zampiello – mastering
