= Torche (album) =

Studio album by Torche
- Released: March 8, 2005
- Recorded: 2004 at Atomic Audio (Tampa, Florida)
- Genres: Stoner metal, sludge metal
- Length: 29:40
- Label: Robotic Empire

Torche chronology
Torche (2005)	In Return (2007)

Torche is the debut album by American metal band Torche. It was released through Robotic Empire on March 8, 2005. It was also reissued on June 18, 2007, through Rock Action Records with a bonus track and alternate artwork. The opening track, "Charge of the Brown Recluse", is a new version of the song that was released before by the band Floor, which Steve Brooks and Juan Montoya were members, and appears in the box-set Below & Beyond.

== Track listing ==
No.	Title	Length
1.	"Charge of the Brown Recluse"	3:01
2.	"Safe"	1:19
3.	"Mentor"	2:22
4.	"Erase"	2:17
5.	"Fuck Addict"	3:37
6.	"Vampyro"	1:51
7.	"Rockit"	1:08
8.	"Fire"	2:28
9.	"Holy Roar"	2:05
10.	"The Last Word"	9:32

Reissue bonus track

11. "Make Me Alive" – 2:31

== Personnel ==
- Steve Brooks – vocals, rhythm guitar
- Juan Montoya – lead guitar
- Jonathan Nuñez – bass
- Rick Smith – drums
