= Nefarious Realm =

Nefarious Realm Productions
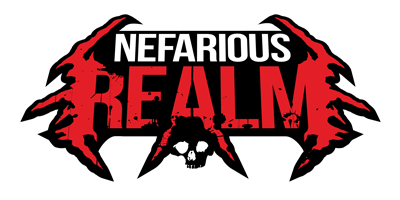
- Logo
- Company type: Private
- Website type: News website, Entertainment
- Available in: English
- Founded: 2006
- Headquarters: Boston, Massachusetts, {{{location_country}}}
- Area served: Worldwide
- Founder: Matt Darcy
- Website: www.nefariousrealm.com
- Launched: February 2006
- Current status: Active

Nefarious Realm is a metal, hardcore, and extreme music-themed website and media company, founded by Matt Darcy in early 2006. The website mainly covers band, music, and industry news, features including interviews, an album release schedule, music videos, and release reviews. The website also has articles, columns, and feature segments including interviews with bands, industry professionals, alternative models and porn stars which include Suicide Girls and Burning Angel.

While for the first few years, the website went relatively unknown. It was not until 2008 that it began to get recognition and after a major overhaul in late 2011, Nefarious Realm really saw its beginning starting in 2012.

Nefarious Realm started presenting shows in 2007 with one local show featuring Slayed Innocence and Kultur among others. It was not until 2009 until the second show which then started nearly two years of continuous concerts. Of which was a small festival, Rock Your Face Off Fest that was held in 2010 and 2011. The shows ranged from local showcases to international touring bands including The Ocean and Wormrot. The last show was held in November 2011.

In July 2012, Nefarious Realm announced the planning of a free 666 song compilation, titled The Number of the Compilation.

In the beginning of 2013, Nefarious Realm announced the launch of an imprint vinyl record label, Threshold of Pain Records. The first four releases include Seemless's debut self-titled released back in 2004 and again in 2005 through Equal Vision Records, Orwell, Earthrise, and Abnormality.

== Threshold of Pain Records ==
Launched in the beginning part of 2013, Nefarious Realm created the imprint specialty vinyl-only record label Threshold of Pain Records to release very limited edition offerings.

In April 2013 it was said that instrumental sludge band Giza would also be releasing an LP through Threshold of Pain.

== Rock Your Face Off Fest ==
On February 27, 2010, Nefarious Realm held its biggest event, The Rock Your Face Off Fest which featured Skull Hammer, We Met Aliens, Hivesmasher, The Bathory Silence, Wheels Of Justice, The Summoned, Widow Sunday, Ravage, and headliners The Empire Shall Fall who consist of members of Killswitch Engage, Seemless, and The Dear Hunter making their debut Massachusetts appearance at the event.

On March 5, 2011, the second Rock Your Face Off event was held with Revocation as the headliner and support from Burning Human, Widow Sunday, Acaro, Orwell, Hivesmasher, Tight Rope, Thoughts In Reverse, In Dying Arms, Sirens, Nemecide, and Pathogenic.
