= Seemless (Seemless album) =

Studio album by Seemless
- Released: January 25, 2005
- Recorded: 2003
- Genre: Stoner metal, hard rock, alternative metal
- Label: Equal Vision
- Producer: Seemless, Jason Suecof

Seemless chronology
Seemless (2005)	What Have We Become (2006)

Seemless is the debut studio album by American hard rock supergroup Seemless.

== Track listing ==
Professional ratings
Review scores
Source	Rating
antimusic.com	4.5/5 stars
metalreview.com	(7.6/10)
scenepointblank.com	6.5/10 stars
schwegweb.com	(not rated)

1. Intro - 1:55
2. Something's Got To Give - 5:05
3. The Wanderer - 3:47
4. Soft Spoken Sanity - 4:21
5. Endless - 4:35
6. The Crisis - 2:48
7. Lay My Burden Down - 4:26
8. War/Peace - 5:55
9. In My Time Of Need - 4:42
10. All Is Not Lost - 2:13
11. In This Life - 5:25
12. Maintain (Live at Sirius Studios) - 4:44

== Credits ==
- Jesse Leach- vocals
- Derek Kerswill- drums
- Pete Cortese- guitars
- Kevin Schuler- bass
- Jeff Fultz- bass (on the track "Maintain" only)
