= In Return (EP) =

EP by Torche
- Released: September 18, 2007
- Studio: 305, Southern Noise Studio
- Genres: Stoner metal, sludge metal
- Length: 19:23
- Labels: Robotic Empire (US); Rock Action Records (EU)

Torche chronology
Torche (2005)	In Return (2007)	Meanderthal (2008)

In Return (CD + EP/10") is the second release by American stoner metal band Torche. It was released on September 18, 2007, through Robotic Empire in the United States and Rock Action Records in Europe on October 15. Artwork and design were created by Baroness singer John Dyer Baizley.

Professional ratings
Review scores
Source	Rating
Baltimore City Paper	Positive
Drowned in Sound	9/10

== Track listing ==
No.	Title	Length
1.	"Warship"	2:09
2.	"In Return"	2:32
3.	"Bring Me Home"	2:45
4.	"Rule the Beast"	2:41
5.	"Olympus Mons"	2:07
6.	"Tarpit Carnivore"	3:30
7.	"Hellion"	3:39
Total length:		19:23

== Personnel ==
- Steve Brooks – vocals, rhythm guitar
- Juan Montoya – lead guitar
- Jonathan Nuñez – bass
- Rick Smith – drums

=== Production ===
- John Dyer Baizley – artwork and design
- Daniel Escauriza – recording
- Jonathan Nuñez – recording
