= Torche (band) =

American stoner metal band

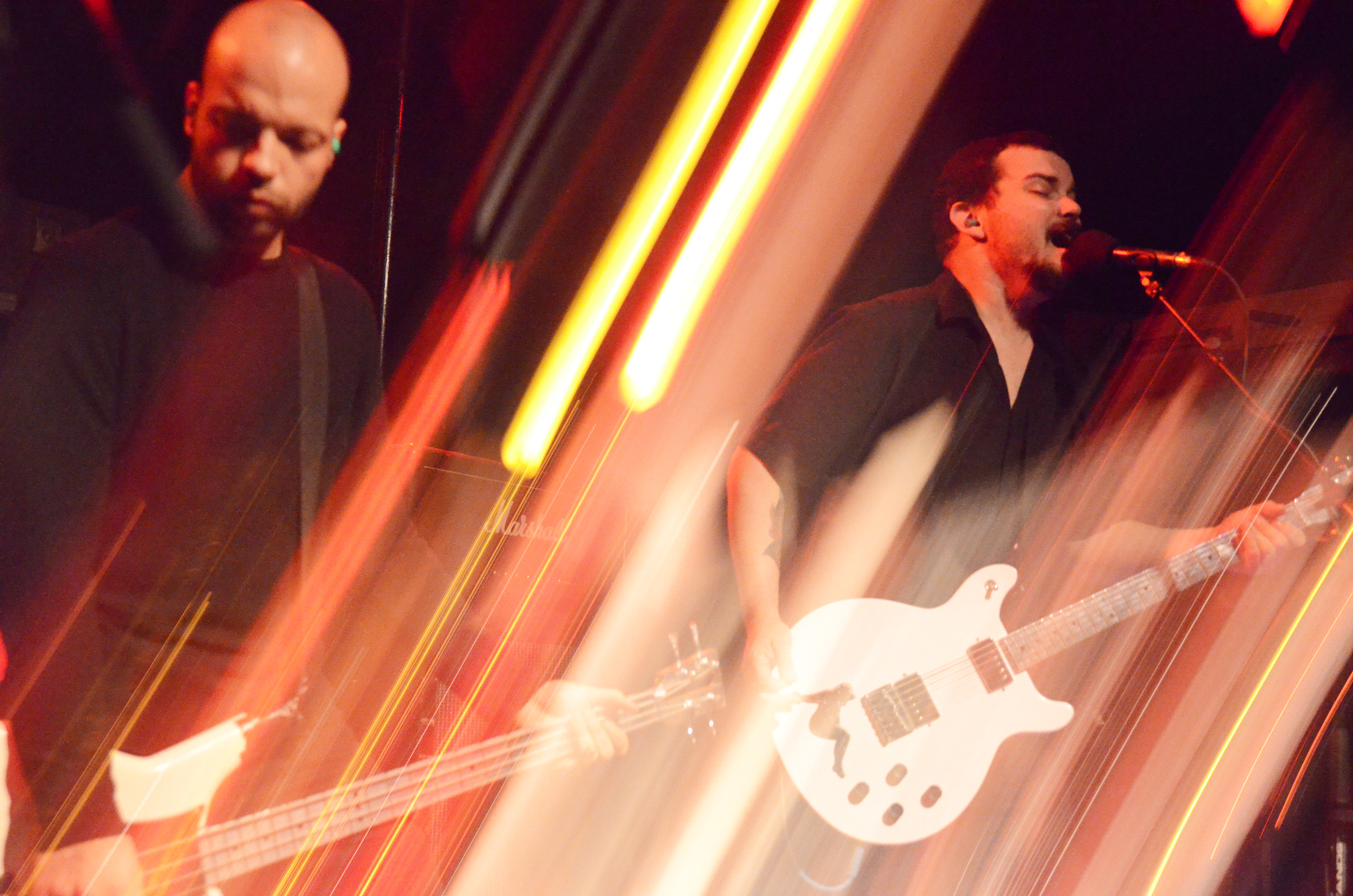
- Torche performing in 2013

Background information
- Origin: Miami, Florida, U.S.
- Genres: Stoner metal; sludge metal; stoner rock; alternative rock
- Years active: 2004–2022, 2025-present
- Labels: Relapse; Hydra Head; Rock Action; Robotic Empire
- Members: Steve Brooks; Jonathan Nuñez; Rick Smith; Eric Hernandez
- Past members: Juan Montoya; Andrew Elstner
- Website: torchemusic.com

Torche is an American stoner metal/sludge metal band from Miami, Florida. The group formed in 2004 and has released five studio albums, four EPs, two split albums, and three singles. They released their fifth and final studio album, Admission, in 2019.

== History ==
The group was formed in 2004 by Steve Brooks (ex-Floor), Juan Montoya (ex-Floor, ex-Cavity, ex-Ed Matus Struggle), Jonathan Nuñez and Rick Smith (who also played in the grindcore bands Shitstorm, Tyranny of Shaw, Adore Miridia, the screamo band Tunes for Bears to Dance To, and punk band Post-Teens). According to MTracks.com: "Their music has a unique, hard-hitting sound that provokes a wide range of emotions, and they have a large fan base throughout the world." They have toured with Mogwai, Isis, Pelican, Clutch, Black Cobra, Baroness, Jesu, The Sword, Coheed and Cambria, Stinking Lizaveta, Harvey Milk, Boris, and High on Fire. Steve Brooks, however, has said that they do not consider themselves a metal band. In describing the band's sound, Smith said in an interview: "To me it's mostly a combination of everything we listen to collectively as a band. We take what we like from what we grew up on and use it as creatively as we can. I think the meshing of different sounds comes naturally just because we all have different musical backgrounds yet have a ton of common interests." In terms of touring, Brooks said Torche is getting more of a young crowd.

On April 8, 2008, the band released their second album, Meanderthal. It was produced by Kurt Ballou (Converge, Genghis Tron). It was met with critical acclaim from publications including Decibel magazine, who ranked Meanderthal No. 1 on their list of the Top 40 Extreme Albums of 2008, and Pitchfork, who gave the album an 8.2/10 score in their review. In an interview, Brooks said the band themselves came up with the album's concept in terms of artwork and packaging, along with Aaron Turner. Brooks has also said that in terms of writing material, the band focuses on what they like, rather than worrying about a "backlash" from their fans.

Singer/guitarist Stephen Brooks is one of the few openly gay musicians in the metal scene. He did an interview round table in 2008 on thestranger.com with other openly gay musicians such as Brian Cook (Russian Circles, Sumac, These Arms Are Snakes, Botch), and Juan Velazquez of Abe Vigoda.

In late 2008, Juan Montoya left the band, a move credited to musical differences. Steve Brooks said, "He is an amazing guitarist, but we are just not on the same page... but Torche will still carry on as a 3 piece band". As of 2010, Juan Montoya joined up with ex-Bloodsimple members Bevan Davies and Kyle Sanders, and Charlie Suarez of Sunday Driver to create the band "MonstrO" In an interview with Malia James, Brooks revealed that Montoya's departure was acrimonious, and involved physical violence between the two of them.

Torche embarked on tours with bands such as dredg in April 2009, and another with a reunited Harvey Milk. The band opened for Coheed and Cambria on their headlining tour alongside Circa Survive in spring 2010. One of Torche's earliest festival performances was at Incubate in 2006. After that, the band played at SXSW in 2008.

In January 2011, it was announced on the Riverfront Times blog that Andrew Elstner (Riddle of Steel, Tilts) would be joining Torche. The band released their fourth album, Restarter, in February 2015 on Relapse Records.

Torche announced their fifth album, Admission, on May 19, 2019, with the release of the song "Slide". The album was released on Relapse Records July 12, 2019.

In May 2022, founding frontman Steve Brooks announced the upcoming tour supporting Meshuggah would be his last with the band, stating "We're a few months away from the last tour I'm doing with Torche," he writes. "We've been so very lucky and went far beyond what I imagined. I just don't have it in me to keep this going living on opposite sides of the country. Much love to my band members and everyone that supported us these 18 years! See y'all this Sept/Oct."

On September, 17, 2022, it was later confirmed in previous comments from a post on Brooks's personal Instagram that the band would not continue without him after the end of their then-pending tour. Torche played their final concert on October 16, 2022, opening for Meshuggah and In Flames at the Tabernacle in Atlanta, Georgia.

Both Torche and Cave In issued on May 23, 2025, that they would perform a joint show on September 10 at the Electric Ballroom in London, Torche's first concert since their 2022 dissolution. The concert would take place during Cave In's European tour commemorating the 25th anniversary of their Jupiter album, while also thus far being a standalone performance for Torche. On November 11, 2025, it was issued that Torche was added to the 2026 ‘Prepare The Ground‘ festival .

== Members ==
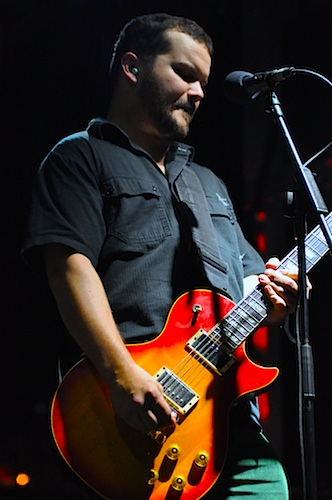
Frontman Steve Brooks live in concert

Final lineup

- Steve Brooks – vocals, rhythm guitar (2004–2022, 2025–present)
- Jonathan Nuñez – lead guitar (2017–2022, 2025–present), bass (2004–2017)
- Rick Smith – drums (2004–2022, 2025–present)
- Eric Hernandez – bass (2017–2022, 2025–present)

Former

- Juan Montoya – lead guitar (2004–2008)
- Andrew Elstner – lead guitar, backing vocals (2011–2016)

Touring

- Howard Johnston – live lead guitar (2010)

== Discography ==
Studio albums

Year	Title	Label
2005	Torche	Robotic Empire/ Rock Action Records
2008	Meanderthal	Hydra Head Records/ Robotic Empire
2012	Harmonicraft	Volcom Entertainment
2015	Restarter	Relapse Records
2019	Admission	Relapse Records

EPs

Year	Title	Label
2007	In Return	Robotic Empire/ Rock Action Records
2009	Healer / Across the Shields	Hydra Head Records
2009	Meanderthal Demos	Rotting Chapel
2010	Songs for Singles	Hydra Head Records

Splits

Year	Title	Label
2009	Chapter Ahead Being Fake (split with Boris)	Daymare Records
2011	Torche / Part Chimp	Chunklet

Singles

Year	Single	Album
2010	"King Beef"	Chapter Ahead Being Fake
2011	"U.F.O."	Songs for Singles
2012	"Pow Wow" / "80s Prom Song"	Decibel Flexi-Disc Series
2012	"Kicking"	Harmonicraft
2012	"Harmonslaught"	(Songs later appeared on deluxe version of Restarter)
2013	"Keep Up/Leather Feather"	n/a
2022	"It Never Began"	n/a

Other appearances

- Metal Swim – Adult Swim compilation album (2010)
- "In Bloom" (originally by Nirvana; tribute album Whatever Nevermind) (2015, Robotic Empire)
