= As Real as It Gets =

Studio album by Sworn Enemy
- Released: March 25, 2003
- Genre: Crossover thrash, metalcore
- Length: 29:06
- Label: Elektra
- Producer: Jamey Jasta, Chris "Zeuss" Harris

Sworn Enemy chronology
Integrity Defines Strength (2002)	As Real as It Gets (2003)	The Beginning of the End (2006)

As Real as It Gets is the first full-length studio album released by the metalcore band, Sworn Enemy. It was released on March 25, 2003, by Elektra Records. The title track is used in the film, The Texas Chainsaw Massacre.

== Track list ==
All tracks by Sworn Enemy

No.	Title	Length
1.	"Sworn Enemy"	3:37
2.	"One Way Trip"	2:11
3.	"As Real as it Gets"	3:03
4.	"My Misery"	2:11
5.	"Labeled"	2:54
6.	"Fallen Grace"	2:46
7.	"Time Heals No Wounds"	2:24
8.	"Days Past"	3:15
9.	"Innocence Lost"	2:45
10.	"These Tears"	4:02
Total length:		29:06

== Personnel ==
- Sal Lococo - vocals
- Mike Raffinello - guitar
- Lorenzo Antonucci - guitar
- Mike Couls - bass guitar
- Paul Antignani - drums
