= Seemless =

American rock band

- Origin: Massachusetts, United States
- Genres: Stoner metal, hard rock, alternative metal
- Years active: 2002–2009
- Labels: Equal Vision, Losing Face, Threshold of Pain
- Past members: Jesse Leach; Derek Kerswill; Pete Cortese; Jeff Fultz; Dave Pino (touring)
- Website: seemlessband.com

Seemless was an American stoner metal band formed by ex-Shadows Fall/Unearth drummer Derek Kerswill, Killswitch Engage vocalist Jesse Leach, and ex-Overcast/Killswitch Engage guitarist Pete Cortese.

Formed in 2002 following Leach's departure from Killswitch Engage, Seemless was signed to Equal Vision Records, and released their first LP, Seemless. They toured with Nonpoint, Trivium, In Flames, SOiL, Fu Manchu, Lacuna Coil, and several others.

In late 2012/early 2013 it was announced that Threshold of Pain Records, an imprint label of media company Nefarious Realm would be re-issuing their debut album Seemless on limited edition vinyl.

== Breakup ==
In 2009, Seemless announced that the band would play its final show on September 12, 2009 at The Lucky Dog in Worcester, Massachusetts. Derek Kerswill joined Unearth, while Jeff Fultz and Pete Cortese concentrated on their new band, Bloodwitch. Jesse Leach started several projects and then rejoined Killswitch Engage in February 2012.

== Albums ==
- Seemless (2005)
- What Have We Become (2006)
