= Sworn Enemy =

American metal/hardcore band

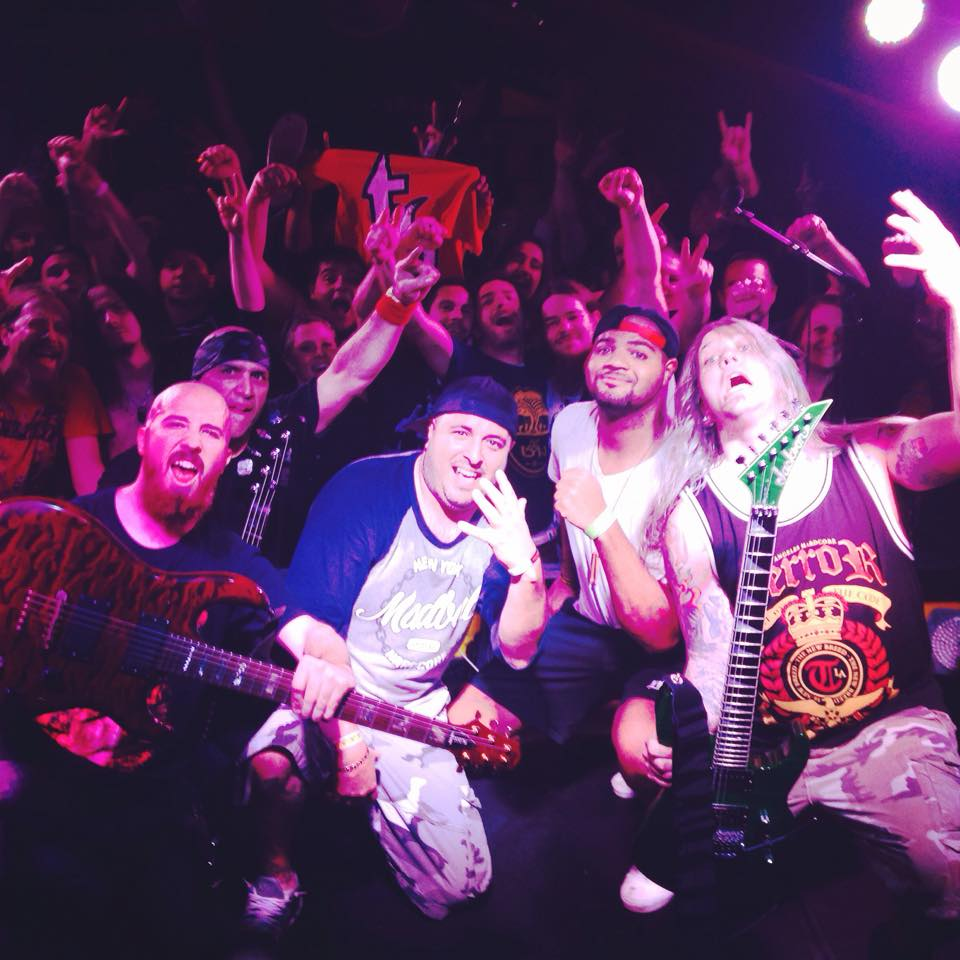
- Sworn Enemy in 2014

Background information
- Origin: Queens, New York, U.S.
- Genres: Metalcore; hardcore punk; tough guy hardcore
- Years active: 1997–present
- Labels: Stillborn, Abacus, Century Media, Elektra
- Members: Sal Lococo; Jeff Cummings; Matt Garzilli; Mike Pucciarelli; Taykwuan Jackson
- Past members: Lorenzo Antonucci; Mike Raffinello; Mike Couls; Shawn "Tootsie" Cox; Danny Lamagna; Mike Palmer; Jimmy Sagos; Paul Antignani; Jerad "JRad" Buckwalter; Timmy Mycek; Paul Wallmaker; Zoli and sid cabalero
- Website: Sworn Enemy on Facebook

Sworn Enemy is an American metalcore band from New York City, formed in 1997.

== History ==
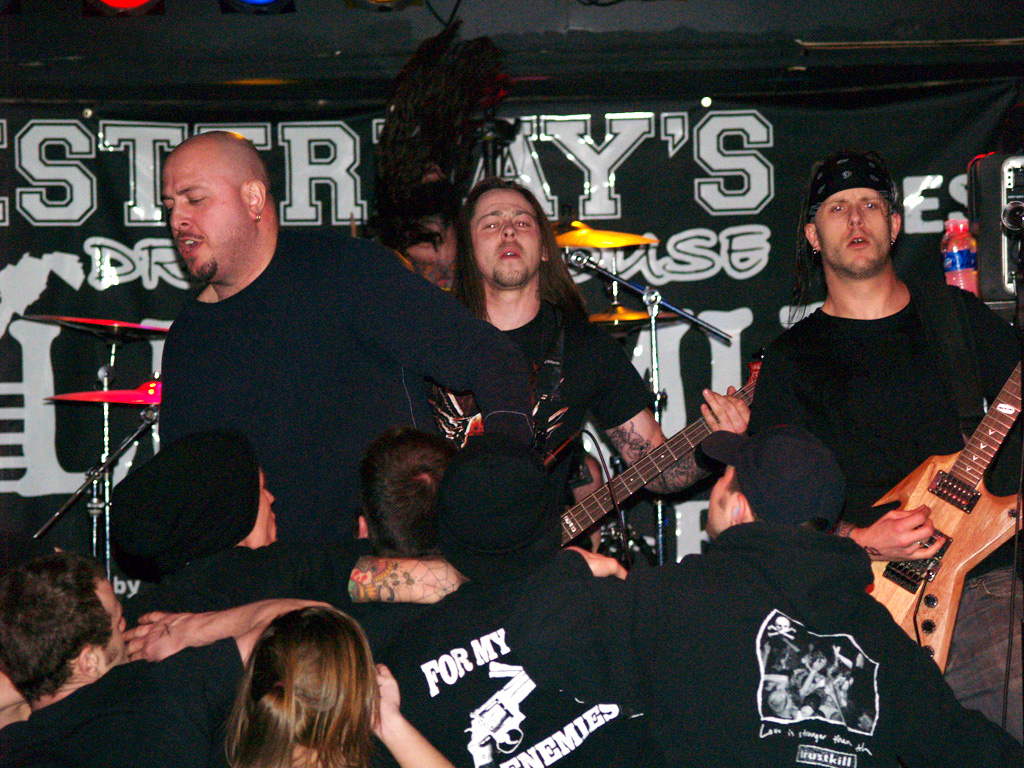
Sworn Enemy performing in 2008

The band formed as "Downfall" and later on as "Mindset", a product of the extremely expansive and influential New York hardcore scene. At its original inception the band centered on founding members: vocalist Sal Lococo, lead guitarist Lorenzo Antonucci, second guitarist Mike Raffinello, bass player Mike Palmer, and drummer Zoli.

The band's early output as Mindset was limited to a demo, an appearance on the New Found Hope II – The First Amendment compilation CD, and a three-song 7-inch named State of Mind.

Soon after the State of Mind release, another band named Mindset appeared on the underground metal scene, having existed as Mindset before the Queens Mindset. Therefore, Sal and crew changed their name to Sworn Enemy.

The band continued to play shows and garner attention in the scene. In 2001 the band released Negative Outlook on Jamey Jasta's Stillborn Records. The record was a mix of old school hardcore punk and new school breakdowns, and it quickly gained the band attention in the broader hardcore scene. Soon after came Integrity Defines Strength, the title being a play on the I.D.S. crew that Sworn Enemy claimed loyalty to. It contained 3 new songs and a live set at CBGB.

Sworn Enemy signed a release deal with Elektra Records in 2003. The result was As Real as It Gets. The band changed their style as the CD featured a large thrash metal influence, as well as abrasive, near-black metal. The new style and worldwide distribution led to tours with bands such as Anthrax as well as a stint on Ozzfest that year.

The Beginning of the End was released on Abacus Records, a division of Century Media focusing on underground metal and hardcore inspired bands. The new record displayed more thrash influence, and was immediately followed with a national tour with Six Feet Under. They have also toured with Dying Fetus and Hatebreed.

In 2007, they were on the Trendkill Tour alongside Kataklysm, As Blood Runs Black, Too Pure to Die, and Suicide Silence.

They were asked by longtime friends, Earth Crisis, to be a part of their reunion tour.

On March 29, 2008, the music video for the first single debuted on MTV2's Headbangers Ball. The video for "A Place of Solace" from the Maniacal CD was directed and shot by David Brodsky and edited by Allison Woest.

Total World Domination was released June 16 in US and June 22 in Europe via Century Media Records. The record was once again produced by Tim Lambesis from As I Lay Dying. Lorenzo Antonucci (guitars, vocals) commented: "I'm very excited about this album and its writing process was better than ever. I've been a part of all the writing for every record and I feel this is our best foundation yet. We took it back to As Real as It Gets with a little of Beginning of the End and Maniacal in it. The sound is way faster and more pissed off than ever, harder than ever and a lot more ignorant. It was also fun working with Tim again. This also marks our first recording with Sid (bass) and JRad (drums), so we are all very excited about that. We couldn't be more proud of this effort and prepare to have your faces melted!"

During the next few years the band saw some lineup changes. In May 2014 the band regrouped with new members and released "Living On Borrowed Time" on Rock Ridge records. They followed the album with several tours including tours in the U.S., Canada, and Europe. Sworn Enemy is still touring in support of "Living on Borrowed Time".

== Discography ==
As Mindset	Released	Record label
Demo	1998	
State of Mind 7"	1998	Back ta Basics
New Found Hope II – The First Amendment (compilation appearance)	1997	
As Sworn Enemy
Negative Outlook	2001	Stillborn
Integrity Defines Strength	2002	Stillborn
As Real as It Gets	2003	Elektra
Internet promo	2005 (two new demo MP3s spread by lead singer Sal Lococo through the East Coast Hardcore Messageboard)	
The Beginning of the End	2006	Abacus
Maniacal	2007	Century Media
Total World Domination	2009	Century Media
Living on Borrowed Time	2014	Rock Ridge Music
Gamechanger	2019	M-Theory Audio

== Members ==
Current members

- Sal Lococo – vocals (1997–present)
- Jeff Cummings – lead guitar (2010–present)
- Matt Garzilli – rhythm guitar (2011–present)
- Mike Pucciarelli – bass (2012–present)
- Taykwuan Jackson – drums (2014–present)

Touring members

- Wouter Sadonis - drums (2019, 2023)

Former members

- Zoli – drums (1997–1998)
- Mike Raffinello – rhythm guitar (1997–2005)
- Jimmy Sagos – bass (1997–2001)
- Paul Wallmaker – drums (1998–2001)
- Timmy Mycek – drums (2001–2002)
- Mike Couls – bass (2001–2005)
- Paul Antignani – drums (2002–2008; died 2018)
- Jordan Mancino – drums (2008–2009)
- Lorenzo Antonucci – lead guitar (1997–2010), rhythm guitar (2005–2008)
- Jamin Hunt – bass (2005–2008), rhythm guitar (2008–2012), lead guitar (2010)
- Sid Awesome – bass (2008–2011)
- Jerad "JRad" Buckwalter – drums (2009–2012)
- Anthony Paganini – bass (2011–2012)
- Danny Lamagna – drums (2012–2014)

Timeline
