= All Hail the Yeti =

American heavy metal band

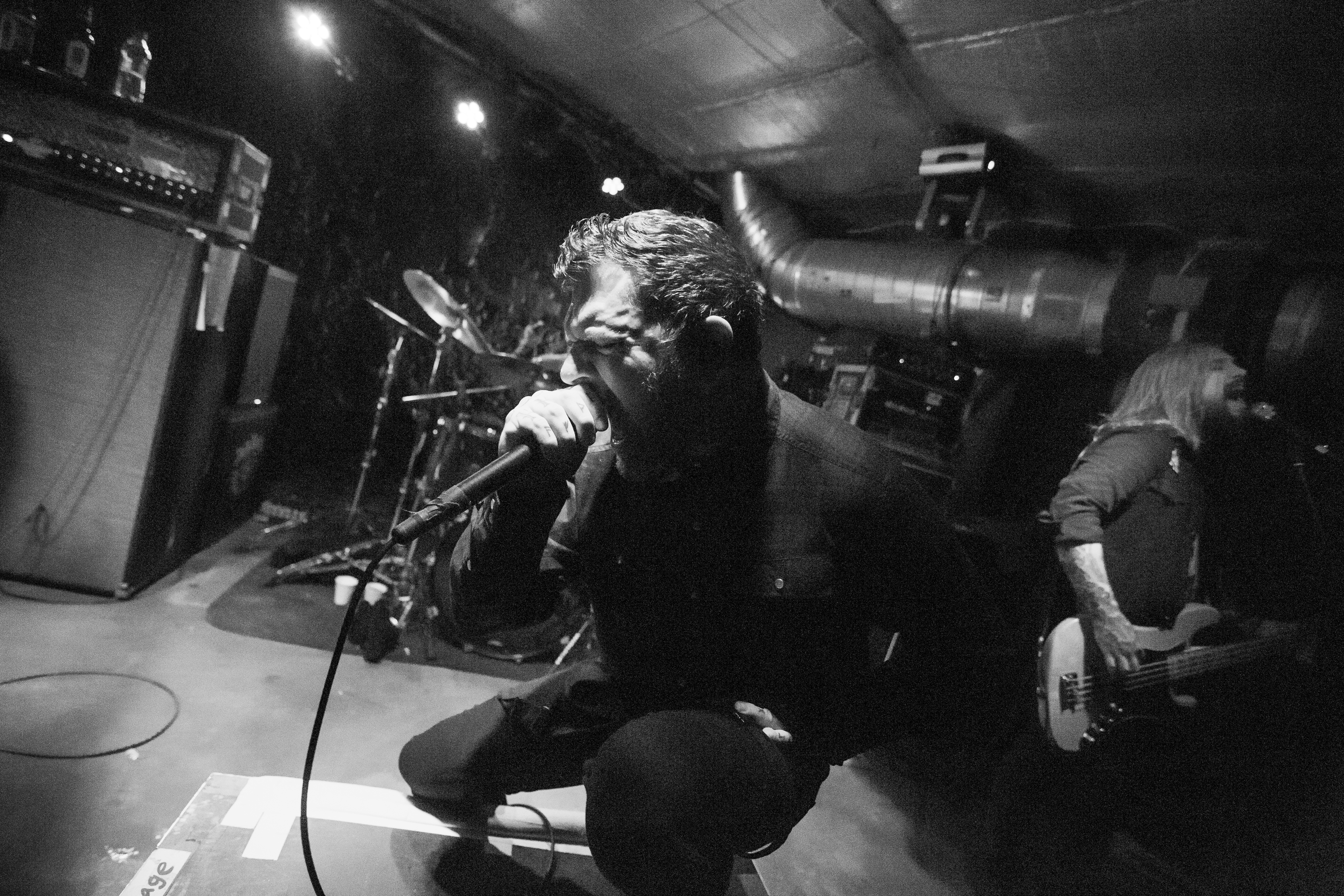
The band in 2019

All Hail the Yeti is an American heavy metal band from Los Angeles. Formed in 2006, the ensemble has released three studio albums entitled All Hail the Yeti, Screams From a Black Wilderness and Highway Crosses.

== History ==
On April 8, 2016, the band released Screams from a Black Wilderness, produced by Matt Hyde. From late July until late August 2016, the band performed on their Haunted & Damaged North American headline tour with American thrash metal band Final Drive.

== Critical reception ==
Holly Wright of Team Rock describes Screams from a Black Wilderness as "surprisingly upbeat, centring its sound on a heady combo of metalcore and stoner riffs". Anne Nickoloff of Alternative Press Magazine portrays the songs on Screams from a Black Wilderness as "complete mini stories, making the concept album a compilation of horror tales".

== Personnel ==
=== Current members ===
- Connor Garritty – lead vocals
- Nicholas Diltz – bass, backing vocals
- Ryan "Junior" Kittlitz – drums
- Dave Vanderlinde – guitars

=== Former members ===
- Alan Stokes – guitar (2006–2018)

== Discography ==
=== Studio albums ===
- All Hail the Yeti (2012)
- Screams from a Black Wilderness (2016)
- Highway Crosses (2018)

=== Extended plays ===
- Trees on Fire with Songs of Blood (2010, as Yeti)
- Within the Hollow Earth (2021)

=== Singles ===
- "Slow Season"
- "Feed the Pigs"
