= Copenhell =

Annual Heavy Metal festival in Copenhagen

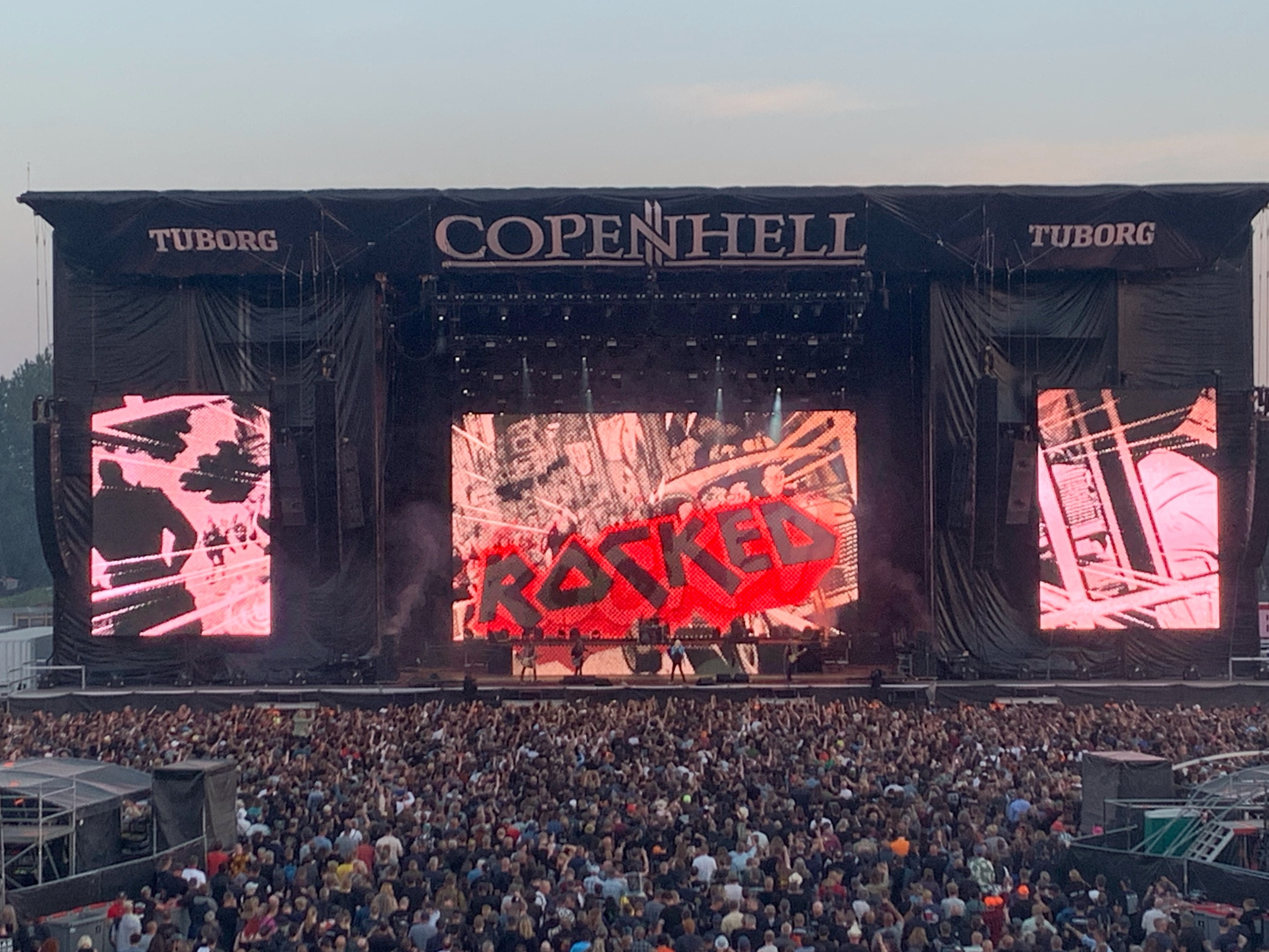
- Copenhell 2023
- Genre: Heavy metal, all genres of metal
- Dates: June
- Locations: Refshaleøen, Denmark
- Years active: 2010-present
- Organiser: Live Nation
- Website: copenhell.dk

Copenhell is a heavy metal festival held annually at Refshaleøen in Copenhagen, Denmark, since 2010. It was one of the first open-air heavy metal festivals in Denmark.

The festival started in 2010 with two stages, the main stage Helviti and secondary stage Hades. The Upcoming Stage was introduced in 2011 for unsigned bands and was renamed Pandæmonium in 2012. In 2019 the Pandæmonium stage was upgraded to mid size bands and a new stage called Gehenna was added as the smallest stage.

== By year ==
=== Copenhell 2010 ===
Copenhell 2010 took place from Friday 11 June to Saturday 12 June.

Line-up:

- Deftones
- Megadeth
- Suicidal Tendencies
- Hatebreed
- Behemoth
- Napalm Death
- Mnemic
- The Psyke Project
- Supercharger
- DevilDriver
- Whitechapel
- The Dillinger Escape Plan
- Adept
- Dead by April
- Danko Jones
- 3 Inches of Blood
- The Damned Things

=== Copenhell 2011 ===
Copenhell 2011 took place from Friday 17 June to Saturday 18 June.

Line-up:

- Artillery
- Opeth
- Korn
- Judas Priest
- Rolo Tomassi
- The Burning
- Baptized in Blood
- Deicide
- Anvil
- Bullet for My Valentine
- Protest the Hero
- Mayhem
- Gwar
- Doctor Midnight & The Mercy Cult
- All That Remains
- Kvelertak
- Morbid Angel
- Crematoria
- Pitchblack
- Billy Boy in Poison
- Helhorse
- Vanir
- The New Low
- Solbrud

=== Copenhell 2012 ===
Copenhell 2012 took place from Friday 15 June to Saturday 16 June including a warmup day on Thursday the 14th. On this day the Danish bands Red Warszawa, Mordax and Svartsot played for the visitors who had tickets that included accommodation (tents).

Line-up:

- Slayer
- Marilyn Manson
- Killswitch Engage
- Lamb of God
- Immortal
- Anthrax
- Skeletonwitch
- Trivium
- All Shall Perish
- Korpiklaani
- Meshuggah
- Gojira
- Mastodon
- Soulfly
- Saxon
- Brutal Truth
- Dying Fetus
- The Kandidate
- Red Warszawa
- Svartsot
- Mordax
- The Interbeing
- Rising
- Barricade
- Redwood Hill
- Cerekloth

=== Copenhell 2013 ===
Copenhell 2013 took place from Friday 14 June to Saturday 15 June, including a warmup day on Thursday 13 June. The Thursday bill this year featured Danish bands Fall of Pantheon, Deus Otiosus, and Hatesphere, as well as the British metalcore band The Defiled, all of whom performed on the Pandæmonium stage.

Line-up:

- Between the Buried & Me
- Illdisposed
- Ghost
- Parkway Drive
- Amon Amarth
- In Flames
- Alice in Chains
- Danzig
- By the Patient
- Purified in Blood
- Cancer Bats
- Scarred by Beauty
- Celeste
- Newsted
- Every Time I Die
- Alestorm
- God Seed
- Accept
- Sabaton
- Testament
- Down
- King Diamond
- Impalers
- Malrun
- Saturnus
- Grave
- Bornholm
- Essence

=== Copenhell 2014 ===
Copenhell 2014 took place from Wednesday 11 June to Friday 13 June. The days have been changed from the usual Thursday-Saturday dates to accommodate Iron Maiden.

Copenhell 2014 was, for the first time in the festival's history, a full 3-day festival.

Line-up:

- Anthrax
- D-A-D (replaced Megadeth)
- Iron Maiden
- Sepultura
- Arch Enemy
- Graveyard
- Obituary
- The Hell
- Within Temptation
- Suicide Silence
- Týr
- Clutch
- My Dying Bride
- Monster Magnet
- Bad Religion
- Watain
- Mercenary
- Triptykon
- Behemoth
- Black Label Society
- Twisted Sister
- Gorguts
- Kill Devil Hill
- Taake
- The Psyke Project
- Avatarium
- Of Mice & Men
- Thy Art Is Murder
- Dawn of Demise
- Fossils
- Blood Eagle
- Helhorse
- Suicidal Angels
- Finntroll
- Aphyxion
- Black Book Lodge
- Iamfire
- Trap Them
- Amenra
- Uncle Acid and the Deadbeats
- Heidra
- Evra
- Toxic Holocaust
- Redwood Hill

=== Copenhell 2015 ===
Copenhell 2015 took place Thursday 18 June to Saturday 20 June.

Line-up:

- Slipknot
- Primus
- Rise Against
- Ghost
- Kreator
- The Darkness
- Gojira
- Body Count FEAT. Ice-T
- Pretty Maids
- HammerFall
- A Day to Remember
- Red Fang
- Suicidal Tendencies
- Bloodbath
- Turbonegro
- Life of Agony
- Cannibal Corpse
- Asking Alexandria
- At the Gates
- Exodus
- Ensiferum
- Nuclear Assault
- Blues Pills
- Marduk
- Primordial
- Iron Reagan
- Code Orange
- Upon a Burning Body
- Konkhra
- Raunchy
- Saint Vitus
- Krokodil
- Solbrud
- Monolord
- Butcher Babies
- Morgoth
- Red Warszawa
- Night Fever
- Huldre
- Sea
- Halshug
- Horned Almighty
- Franklin Zoo

=== Copenhell 2016 ===
Copenhell 2016 took place Thursday 23 June to Saturday 25 June.

Line-up:

- Black Sabbath
- Scorpions
- King Diamond
- Alice Cooper
- Megadeth
- Dropkick Murphys
- Rival Sons
- Sixx:AM
- Converge
- Clawfinger
- Epica
- Helhorse
- Norma Jean
- August Burns Red
- Defecto
- Blind Guardian
- Black Peaks
- With the Dead
- Sólstafir
- Tremonti
- Amon Amarth
- Entombed A.D.
- Trivium
- Kadavar
- Redwood Hill
- Abbath
- Artillery
- I'll Be Damned
- Tribulation
- Grusom
- Bombus
- Shinedown
- Havok
- Decapitated
- Bersærk
- Dark Funeral
- Red Warszawa
- Bömbers
- Monuments
- Beartooth
- Gutterdämmerung

=== Copenhell 2017 ===
Copenhell 2017 took place on Thursday June 22 to Saturday June 24.

Line-up:

- System of a Down
- Five Finger Death Punch
- Slayer
- Prophets of Rage
- Alter Bridge
- Rob Zombie
- In Flames
- Airbourne
- Europe
- Ministry
- Baroness
- Opeth
- Saxon
- The Dillinger Escape Plan
- Overkill
- Carcass
- Red Warszawa
- Powerwolf
- Invocator
- Black Star Riders
- DevilDriver
- Myrkur
- Every Time I Die
- Candlemass
- Psychotic Waltz
- Hatesphere
- 99Plajo
- Architects
- Frank Carter & The Rattlesnakes
- Nothing More
- The Black Dahlia Murder
- Batushka
- Memorian
- Huldre
- Motionless in White
- Rising
- The Raven Age
- Lost Society
- Inglorious
- Ghost Iris
- Baest
- Slægt
- Seven Thorns

=== Copenhell 2018 ===
Copenhell 2018 took place on Thursday June 21 to Saturday June 23 plus a warmup day on Wednesday June 20.

Line-up:

- Ozzy Osbourne
- Avenged Sevenfold
- Ghost
- Nightwish
- Alice in Chains
- Helloween
- Parkway Drive
- Deftones
- W.A.S.P
- Kreator
- Steel Panther
- Arch Enemy
- Bullet for My Valentine
- Alestorm
- Satyricon
- Asking Alexandria
- Graveyard
- Sodom
- Enslaved
- Corrosion of Conformity
- Tremonti
- Exodus
- Suffocation
- Kellermensch
- 99Plajo
- Jakob Stegelmann with Aarhus Symphony Orchestra
- At the Gates
- Bersærk
- Thy Art Is Murder
- Nothing More
- Crossfaith
- Danko Jones
- Zeal & Ardor
- Igorrr
- Defecto
- Tsjuder
- Skindred (replaced by Møl)
- Orm
- AuĐn
- The Last Internationale
- Livløs
- Natjager
- Santa Cruz (replaced by Soulfly, Smertegrænsens Toldere, UxDxS, Nyt Liv and The Sledge)
- Tainted Lady

Warmup day line-up:

- Neurosis
- L7
- Mustasch
- Turnstile
- Red Warszawa

=== Copenhell 2019 ===
Copenhell 2019 took place Wednesday June 19 to Saturday June 22.

Line-up:

- Tool
- Slipknot
- Scorpions
- Slash featuring Myles Kennedy and the Conspirators
- Lamb of God
- Rob Zombie
- Stone Temple Pilots
- Amon Amarth
- Pretty Maids
- Clutch
- Dimmu Borgir
- Heilung
- Trivium
- Living Colour
- Halestorm
- Glenn Hughes
- Kvelertak
- Refused
- Eagles of Death Metal
- Demons & Wizards
- Orange Goblin
- Whitechapel
- Katatonia
- Baest
- Tesseract
- Terror
- Fever 333
- Eluveitie
- Alien Weaponry
- While She Sleeps
- Municipal Waste
- Skindred
- Belphegor
- Immolation
- Uada
- Vltimas
- Slægt
- Candlebox
- Unleashed
- 1000mods
- Like a Storm
- Cabal
- Manticora
- Konvent
- Demon Head
- The Psyke Project

=== Copenhell 2020 ===
Copenhell 2020 was planned to take place Wednesday June 17 to Saturday June 20, but was cancelled on April 7 due to the COVID-19 pandemic.

=== Copenhell 2021 ===
Copenhell 2021 was planned to take place Wednesday June 16 to Saturday June 19 but was postponed due to the COVID-19 pandemic.

=== Copenhell 2022 ===
Copenhell 2022 took place Wednesday June 15 to Saturday June 18.

Line-up:

- D-A-D
- Opeth
- Metallica
- Iron Maiden
- Judas Priest
- KIϟϟ
- Mercyful Fate
- KoЯn
- Agnostic Front
- Alestorm
- Angstskrig
- Artillery
- Bad Religion
- Baest
- Benediction
- Bersærk
- Blood Incantation
- Bombus
- Deadly Apples
- Death to All
- Denial of God
- Destruction
- Devin Townsend
- Dizzy Mizz Lizzy
- Dog Eat Dog
- Down
- Emperor
- Eyes
- Gatecreeper
- Ghost Iris
- Gloryhammer
- Hällas
- The Hellacopters
- High Command
- Horndal
- Ivy Crown
- Jinjer
- Junkyard Drive
- Knocked Loose
- Konvent
- Lifesick
- LLNN
- LOK
- Lydsyn
- Mastodon
- Midnight
- Myrkur
- Nerved
- Nyredolk
- Orm
- Raised Fist
- The Raven Age
- Red Fang
- Redwood Hill
- Siamese
- Soen
- Soren Andersen
- Sorthandsk
- Spiritbox (cancelled)
- Suicidal Tendencies
- Svartsot
- Thunder
- Thundermother
- Ugly Kid Joe
- Urne
- Vola
- Vreid
- Wargasm
- Wayward Dawn
- Withering Surface
- Xenoblight

=== Copenhell 2023 ===
Copenhell 2023 took place Wednesday June 14 to Saturday June 17.

Lineup:

- Guns N' Roses
- Def Leppard
- Gojira
- Meshuggah
- Mötley Crüe
- Pantera
- Slipknot
- Aborted
- Afsky
- Angelus Apatrida
- Angra
- Angus McSix
- Architects (Cancelled)
- Billy Gibbons
- Blackbraid
- Blackgold
- Brutus
- Cabal
- Clutch
- Crown the Beast
- Dance with the Dead
- Defacing God
- Demon Head
- Dirt Forge
- Electric Callboy
- Employed to Serve
- End
- Enforcer
- Fever 333
- Fishbone
- Forever Still
- Gaerea
- Galge
- Ghost
- The Ghost Inside
- Green Lung
- Halestorm
- Haliphron
- Heriot
- Iotunn
- Jakob Stegelmann & Aarhus Symphony Orchestra
- Kellermensch
- King Buffalo
- Korpiklaani
- Lamentari
- Life of Agony
- Livløs
- Mammoth Way
- Møl
- Napalm Death
- Nervosa
- Nestor (Cancelled)
- Night Fever
- Parkway Drive
- Red Warszawa
- Riverhead
- Rot Away
- Samael
- Saturnus
- Shaam Larein
- Sick Of It All
- Skynd
- Sleep Token
- Spectral Wound
- Speed
- Spiritbox
- Statement
- Steel Inferno
- Strychnos
- Testament
- Three Days Grace
- Touché Amoré
- Undeath
- Undergang
- Vended
- VV
- Zeal & Ardor

=== Copenhell 2024 ===
Copenhell 2024 took place Wednesday June 19 to Saturday June 22.

Lineup:

- Avenged Sevenfold
- Limp Bizkit
- Machine Head
- Tool
- Accept
- Asinhell
- The Baboon Show
- Biohazard
- Body Count
- Brand of Sacrifice
- Bruce Dickinson
- Chelsea Wolfe
- Cradle of Filth
- Corey Taylor
- Corrosion of Conformity
- Crypta
- DeathbyRomy
- Dropkick Murphys
- Dvne
- Dying Fetus
- Eivør
- Empire State Bastard
- Enforced
- Escuela Grind
- Excel
- Fu Manchu
- Hammerfall
- Hardy
- Harm's Way
- Hatebreed
- Hexis
- High on Fire
- The Hives
- Hulder
- Insanity Alert
- JJ and the A's
- John Cxnnor
- Jungle Rot
- Karnivool
- Kerry King
- Khemmis
- Knife
- Die Krupps
- Lack
- Madball
- Make Them Suffer
- Mr. Bungle
- Mimi Barks
- Nakkeknaekker
- Night Verses
- The Offspring
- ORM
- Plaguemace
- Pretty Maids
- Rival Sons
- Sanguisugabogg
- The Scratch
- Skullclub
- Shadow of Intent
- Siamese
- Slaughter to Prevail
- Sort Sol
- Spotlights
- Steel Panther
- Terminalist
- Tom Morello
- Twin Temple
- Thy Art Is Murder
- Underoath
- Until I Wake
- Uriah Heep
- Vansind
- Vulvatorious
- Zulu
- 311
- 802
- 1349

=== Copenhell 2025 ===
Copenhell 2025 took place Wednesday June 18 to Saturday June 21.

Lineup:

- Billy Idol
- Dizzy Mizz Lizzy
- Slipknot
- The Prodigy
- Abbath
- A Mess
- Alien Ant Farm
- Anaal Nathrakh
- Ashes of Billy
- Bastardane
- Battlesnake
- Blood Incantation
- Brat
- Bullet for My Valentine
- Cabal
- Carcass
- Castle Rat
- Conan
- Dethklok
- Dead Poet Society
- Dirty Honey
- Dream Theater
- Exodus
- Fit For An Autopsy
- Fleshwater
- Gabestok
- Gåte
- Gloryhammer
- Gorilla Angreb
- Guilt Trip
- HARDY
- Heave Blood & Die
- Heaven Shall Burn
- HEALTH
- In Flames
- Julie Christmas
- Kim Dracula
- King Diamond
- Kittie
- Kreator
- Last Train
- Lorna Shore
- Mnemic
- Myles Kennedy
- Myrkur
- Nestor
- Poppy
- Powerwolf
- Rise of the Northstar
- Sarcator
- Skarnet
- Skillet
- Skunk Anansie
- Slomosa
- Sodom
- Soulfly
- Stray From The Path
- Strychnos
- Sylosis
- SYL x EYES
- Syracusæ
- Swartzheim
- Terrorpy
- Tetrarch
- The Cult
- The Sandmen
- The Southern River Band
- The Sword
- Thus
- Throwe
- Trold
- VOLA
- Vulvatorious
- Walls of Jericho
- Wiegedood
- Will Haven
- Within Temptation
- Wormrot
- Yosemite in Black

=== Copenhell 2026 ===
Copenhell 2026 took place Wednesday June 24 to Saturday June 27.

Lineup:

- 15 Years in Hell
- Bring Me the Horizon
- Iron Maiden
- Volbeat
- (0)
- A Perfect Circle
- Alestorm
- Alice Cooper
- All Them Witches
- Anthrax
- Babymetal
- Black Label Society
- Black Oak County
- Blood Fire Death
- The Browning
- Bury Tomorrow
- Calva Louise
- Chopper
- Defecto
- Die Spitz
- Djerv
- Dogma
- End It
- Eyehategod
- Faetooth
- Gaerea
- Gatecreeper
- Gridiron
- Henret
- Håndgemeng
- Ice Nine Kills
- Imminence
- Inhuman Nature
- Iotunn
- Jakob Stegelmann & Aarhus Symfoniorkester
- Katla
- Konvent
- Kublai Khan
- Lightchapter
- Loathe
- Maceration
- Malevolence
- Mammoth
- Mastodon
- Mor
- Morild
- Neckbreakker
- Omsorg
- Paleface Swiss
- Papa Roach
- P.O.D.
- Powerplant
- President
- Psychomosher
- Pustulant Flesh
- Queensrÿche
- Rap Martin Rap
- Rival Sons
- Saxon
- Scimitar
- Sepultura
- Six Feet Under
- Slay Squad
- Split
- Social Distortion
- Soilwork
- Suicidal Tendencies
- Thrown
- Tom Morello
- Trivium
- Trollfest
- Twenty One Children
- Unpeople
- Vexed
- Violent Magic Orchestra
- Voice of Baceprot
- Warkings

== See also ==
- List of music festivals
