= Red Warszawa discography =

- Studio albums: 6
- Live albums: 2
- Compilation albums: 1
- Singles: 2
- Video albums: 3
- Music videos: 5
- Demos: 3

Red Warszawa is a heavy metal band from Copenhagen, Denmark, formed in 1986.

== Discography ==
=== Studio albums ===
- Hævi Mætal og Hass (1996) (Heavy Metal and Hash)
- Skal Vi Lege Doktor? (1998) (Wanna Play Doctor?)
- Tysk Hudindustri (2000) (German Skin Industry)
- Omvendt Blå Kors (2002) (Upside-down Blue Cross)
- Return of the Glidefedt (2004) (Return of the Slide Grease)
- De 4 Årstider i Nordvest (2010) (The 4 Seasons in Northwest)

=== Live albums ===
- Polsk Punk på P-dagen (1991)
- Live Aus Kaiser Bierwurst Halle (2001)

=== Compilations ===
- My Poland Collection (2006)

=== Singles ===
- Julemandens Selvmordsbrev (1997) (Santa Claus' Suicide Letter)
- Jarmers Plads (2010) (Jarmer's Square)

=== Demos ===
- Skyd Sven (1987) (Shoot Sven)
- Helt op i Bageren (1991) (All the Way Up in the Baker)
- Norsk Black Metal (1995) (Norwegian Black Metal)

== Videography ==
=== Videos ===
- Polsk Punk På P-Dagen (1999) (Polish Punk on the P-day)
- Jeg Bor i Det Sølvgrå Kuppeltelt (2003) (I Live in the Silver-Grey Cupola Tent)
- Stive Gamle Mænd Som Stønner (2004) (Drunk Old Men That Groan)

=== Music videos ===
- Bøsse Dræbt Med Stegegaffel (Gay killed with carving fork)
- Tror Du Det Er For Sjov Jeg Drikker (Do you think I drink for fun)
- Skinboy
- Fjæsing (Weever)
- Norsk Black Metal (Norwegian Black Metal)
