= Bombus (disambiguation) =

Bombus is the genus that includes the bumblebee.

Bombus may also refer to:

- Bombus (band), a Swedish speed/heavy metal band
  - Bombus (album), 2010
