= Left to Suffer =

American deathcore band

- Origin: Atlanta, Georgia, U.S.
- Genres: Deathcore; metalcore; nu metal
- Years active: 2019–present
- Members: Taylor Barber; Jacob Gordon; Peter Higgs; Levi Dunn
- Past members: Alex Vavra; Christian Nowatzki
- Website: Left to Suffer on Facebook

Left to Suffer is an American nu deathcore band formed in Atlanta, Georgia in 2019. The band consists of vocalist Taylor Barber, bassist Michael Guglielmi, guitarists Peter Higgs and Jacob Gordon, and drummer Zach Allard. Left to Suffer released their debut album, A Year of Suffering, in 2020. In 2023, they released Feral, their second full-length album. Their third studio album, Leap of Death, was released in 2024. They are scheduled to release their fourth album, entitled Unwelcome Guest, on October 9th this year.

== History ==
=== Early years and A Year of Suffering (2019–2022) ===
Left to Suffer was formed in Atlanta, Georgia in 2019. They released their first single, "Burden", with then-Lorna Shore vocalist CJ McCreery (who is now the current vocalist for Immortal Disfigurement). They went on to release their debut album, A Year of Suffering, in 2020.

In January 2021, drummer Levi Dunn left the band amicably to pursue a career as a tattoo artist. Shortly afterwards, Alex Vavra was brought on as the group's new drummer.

In April 2021, Left to Suffer released their On Death EP. On Death was the band's breakthrough release, and featured guests from bands including Crystal Lake, Alpha Wolf, and Chelsea Grin. Shortly after releasing the EP, they also released an audiobook based around its lyrics and themes. In October 2021, Left to Suffer collaborated on a single titled "D.N.R.", which featured Lorna Shore vocalist Will Ramos and Ov Sulfur vocalist Ricky Hoover.

In July 2022, the band self-released a six-song EP titled And Dying Forever. And Dying Forever was mixed by Emmure's Joshua Travis. Left to Suffer then spent the month of October touring the United States with Carnifex. In November 2022, they performed a show in Atlanta with fellow Atlantan band Woe, Is Me. In April and May 2023, the band toured across North America with Chelsea Grin and Carnifex, performing as support along with Ov Sulfur.

=== Feral and Leap of Death (2023–present) ===
In May 2023, Left to Suffer released their second full-length album, Feral. Tyler Lubke wrote in Wall of Sound that Feral was a "phenomenal effort for the band" which "showcased exactly why they are a force to be reckoned with". The song "Artificial Anatomy" features trap metal musician Kim Dracula, and "Primitive Urge" features Fit for an Autopsy's Joe Badolato.

Left to Suffer recorded a three-song EP called Noah, which was co-produced by Three Days Grace drummer and songwriter Neil Sanderson and producer Howard Benson. Sanderson contacted the band on Instagram to invite them to work with him and Benson, after asking Johnny Andrews to name the "coolest heaviest metal band in Atlanta". Sanderson co-wrote the song "Snake" for the EP, which was released as a single in September 2022. Noah was released through Sanderson and Benson's Judge & Jury Records label in August 2023. The same month, the band co-headlined a North America tour with Dutch deathcore band Distant, supported by Justice for the Damned and Cabal.

On August 16, 2024, the band released their third studio album titled Leap of Death.

On April 28, 2026, the band announced their official signing to Hopeless Records. On July 30, 2026, the band announced their upcoming album Unwelcome Guest to be released on October 9, 2026. The album marks the return of their earlier drummer Levi Dunn.

== Musical style ==
Left to Suffer describes themselves as "nu-deathcore", a combination of nu metal and deathcore. Speaking about the nu metal genre, Left to Suffer's Taylor Barber said, "We enjoy that aspect of making music and doing collaborations that are just outside of our genre."

== Accolades ==
Rich Hobson included Left to Suffer in a list of "10 bands saving deathcore" published in Metal Hammer in February 2023. Eli Enis wrote in Revolver in August 2023 that Left to Suffer was a "mainstay" of the deathcore genre.

== Band members ==
Current members

- Taylor Barber – lead vocals (2019–present)
- Jacob Gordon – guitars, backing vocals (2019–present)
- Peter Higgs – guitars, backing vocals (2019–present)
- Levi Dunn – drums (2019–2021, 2026-present)

Former members

- Christian Nowatzki – bass (2019–2025)
- Alex Vavra – drums (2021–2025)

Touring members

- Sam Kubrick-Finney – bass (2023)
- Michael Guglielmi – bass (2025-present)
- Zach Allard – drums (2025-present)

== Discography ==
Studio albums

Title	Album details
A Year of Suffering	Released: July 3, 2020
Feral	Released: May 12, 2023
Leap of Death	Released: August 16, 2024
Unwelcome Guest	Released: October 9, 2026

Live albums

Title	Album details
Live from Hell	Released: December 18, 2020

EPs

Title	Album details
On Death	Released: April 23, 2021
And Dying Forever	Released: July 7, 2022
Noah	Released: August 3, 2023; Produced by Judge & Jury (Neil Sanderson and Howard Benson)

Singles

Song	Year	Album
"Burden" (featuring CJ McCreery)	2019	A Year of Suffering
"Just for Now"	2019	A Year of Suffering
"Lost at Last"	2019	A Year of Suffering
"Loathe" (featuring Jacob Wallace)	2020	A Year of Suffering
"Anger"	2021	On Death
"Depression"	2021	On Death
"D.N.R." (feat. Will Ramos and Ricky Hoover)	2021	non-album single
Fixated (featuring Kamiyada+)	2021	And Dying Forever
"Overwhelming Power"	2022	And Dying Forever
"Snake"	2022	Noah
"Primitive Urge" (featuring Joe Badolato)	2022	Feral
"Disappoint Me"	2023	Feral
"Artificial Anatomy" (featuring Kim Dracula)	2023	Feral
"Lost in the Dark" (featuring Paleface Swiss)	2024	Leap of Death
"Forever" (featuring Alejandro Aranda)	2024	Leap of Death
"Make It Out Alive" (featuring Darius Tehrani)	2024	Leap of Death
"Give Them Death"	2024	Leap of Death
"Shallow Grave" (with Sinizter)	2025	WAR, LIFE, DEATH
"Set the World on Fire"	2025	Non-album single
"Anon" (featuring King 810)	2025	Non-album single
"Devils" (with Vastive)	2025	Non-album single

=== As featured artist ===
Song	Year	Album
"Unraveling" (Ov Sulfur featuring Taylor Barber)	2023	The Burden ov Faith
"What Slept Beneath Tarvos" (The Wise Man's Fear featuring Left to Suffer and Hollow Front)	2024	What Slept Beneath Tarvos
"BlüdGod" (Crystal Lake featuring Taylor Barber)	2024	The Weight of Sound
"Say It to My Face" (If Not for Me featuring Left to Suffer)	2024	non-album single
"Death Walk" (ExitWounds featuring Left to Suffer)	2025	An Offering to Tragedy
"Carry the Weight" (Kage Archer featuring Taylor Barber)	2026	non-album single
