= Leap of Death =

Studio album by Left to Suffer
- Released: August 16, 2024
- Genre: Deathcore; metalcore; nu metal
- Length: 33:11

Left to Suffer chronology
Feral (2023)	Leap of Death (2024)

Singles from Leap of Death
- 1. "Lost in the Dark" Released: February 5, 2024; 2. "Forever" Released: April 17, 2024; 3. "Make It Out Alive" Released: June 5, 2024; 4. "Give Them Death" Released: July 19, 2024

Leap of Death is the third studio album by American deathcore band Left to Suffer, released on August 16, 2024. It is their last album with drummer Alex Vavra and bassist Christian Nowatzki. Several guest musicians appear in the album including Alejandro Aranda, an American Idol contestant who is also vocalist Taylor Barber's bandmate in Seven Hours After Violet.

== Track listing ==
1. "Forever" (featuring Alejandro Aranda) – 3:33
2. "Lost in the Dark" (featuring Marc Zelli of Paleface Swiss) – 3:18
3. "Will It Take My Breath" (featuring Aaron Matts of ten56.) – 4:16
4. "Forsaken" – 4:34
5. "Slow Talk" – 3:56
6. "The Medicine" (featuring Alejandro Aranda and Lil Lotus) – 4:43
7. "Give Them Death" – 3:37
8. "Make It Out Alive" (featuring Darius Tehrani of Spite) – 4:14

== Personnel ==
- Taylor Barber – lead vocals
- Jacob Gordon – guitars, backing vocals
- Peter Higgs – guitars, backing vocals
- Christian Nowatzki – bass
- Levi Dunn – drums
