= Feral (album) =

Studio album by Left to Suffer
- Released: May 12, 2023
- Genre: Nu metal; deathcore
- Length: 25:02

Left to Suffer chronology
A Year of Suffering (2020)	Feral (2023)	Leap of Death (2024)

Singles from Feral
- 1. "Disappoint Me" Released: April 3, 2023; 2. "Artificial Anatomy" Released: May 1, 2023

Professional ratings
Review scores
Source	Rating
Boolin Tunes	4/10
Wall of Sound	8/10

Feral is the second studio album by American metal band Left to Suffer, released on May 12, 2023. The album is the band's first with drummer Alex Vavra. It is alernatively considered an EP due to its 25-minute length. 11 or 12 songs were written for the album but trimmed down to eight for recording. The song "Artificial Anatomy" features trap metal musician Kim Dracula, and "Primitive Urge" features Fit for an Autopsy vocalist Joe Badolato. Coinciding with the album's release, in April and May 2023, the band toured across North America with Chelsea Grin and Carnifex, performing as support along with Ov Sulfur.

== Track listing ==
1. "Feral" – 3:33
2. "Artificial Anatomy" (featuring Kim Dracula) – 3:50
3. "Primitive Urge" (featuring Joe Badolato) – 3:16
4. "Break the Fever" – 2:34
5. "Recluse" – 3:31
6. "Illusion of Sleep" – 2:31
7. "Disappoint Me" – 2:16
8. "Consistent Suffering" – 3:31

== Personnel ==
- Taylor Barber – lead vocals
- Jacob Gordon – guitars, backing vocals
- Peter Higgs – guitars, backing vocals
- Christian Nowatzki – bass
- Levi Dunn – drums
