= Danefae =

Danish progressive metal group

- Origin: Aalborg, Denmark
- Genres: Progressive metal
- Years active: 2017–present
- Members: Anne Olesen; Anders Mogensen; Carl Emil Tofte Jensen; Jonas Agerskov

Danefae is a Danish progressive metal band formed in 2017 by singer Anne Olsen, who was later joined by guitarist Anders Mogensen, bassist Carl Emil Tofte Jensen and drummer Jonas Agerskov at the Royal Academy of Music in Aalborg. The group is noted for blending progressive metal music with Nordic folk elements.

== History ==
Danefae was formed in 2017 as a solo project of singer Anne Olesen. Later in 2019, at the Royal Academy of Music in Aalborg, drummer Jonas Agerskov and guitarist Anders Mogensen, who used to play together, joined forces with Olsen and bassist Carl Emil Tofte Jensen, establishing the group's first and current line-up. The band bears its name from the Danish concept.

Their first album, Tro, was released in 2022. Their second effort, Trøst ("comfort" or "solare" in Danish), was released in January 2025, promoted by the singles "Blind", "Fuglekongen", and "Natsværmer", all released in the year before. "Fuglekongen" is built on the melody of Camille Saint-Saëns's Danse macabre.

== Style ==
Danefae's music is usually defined as progressive metal with an ethereal feeling and Nordic folk elements. They were also described as gothic.

The band's lyrics are in their native Danish and Anne Olesen's voice has been compared to those of Kate Bush and Björk.

They have been compared to acts like Gojira, Opeth, Heilung and fellow Danish act Huldre.

== Members ==
=== Current members ===
- Anne Olesen – vocals, piano (2017–present)
- Anders Mogensen – guitar (2019–present)
- Carl Emil Tofte Jensen – bass (2019–present)
- Jonas Agerskov – drums (2019–present)

== Discography ==
=== Studio albums ===
- Tro (2022)
- Trøst (2025)

=== Singles ===
- "Blind" (2024)
- "Fuglekongen" (2024)
- "Natsværmer" (2024)
