= Apparatus =

Apparatus may refer to:

- Technical term for a body of the Soviet and post-Soviet governments (see Apparatchik)
- Machine
- Equipment
- Critical apparatus, the critical and primary source material that accompanies an edition of a text
- "Apparatus" (song), a song by Bombus
- "Apparatus", a song by Deadguy from the album Fixation on a Co-Worker, 1995
- Apparatus (band), an electro-industrial group active during the nineties
- Apparatus (album), 1995 release by the band Apparatus
- Apparatus (journal), an academic journal on film
- In gymnastics, any of the individual events, or the equipment used in performing the event
- A piece of laboratory equipment
- in anatomy, a group of organs, see Apparatus (anatomy)

== See also ==
- Dispositif, apparatus is an English translation of this philosophical term
- Firefighting apparatus
- Golgi apparatus, an organelle found in most eukaryotic cells
- Apparatus theory, within cinema studies during the 1970s
- The Red Jumpsuit Apparatus, a post-hardcore band
- Ideological state apparatuses, a philosophical construct by Louis Althusser
