= Evra =

Evra or EVRA may refer to:

- EVRA, the ICAO code for Riga International Airport in Latvia
- Evra or Ortho Evra, brand names of norelgestromin/ethinylestradiol, contraceptive patches for women
- Evra, Syria, a small mountain village
- EVRA (band), a Danish post-hardcore/doom-rock band

== People ==
- Janet Evra (born 1988), an English-born singer-songwriter and musician
- Patrice Evra (born 1981), a French footballer
