= Goliath (Kellermensch album) =

Studio album by Kellermensch
- Released: 27 January 2017
- Recorded: Esbjerg, Denmark
- Genre: Experimental rock; art rock
- Length: 36:38
- Label: Universal, Persona Non Grata
- Producer: Sebastian Wolff & Kellermensch

Kellermensch chronology
Kellermensch (2011)	Goliath (2017)	Capitulism (2022)

Singles from Goliath
- 1. "Bad Sign" Released: 18 November 2016; 2. "Pain of Salvation" Released: January 20, 2017

Professional ratings
Review scores
Source	Rating
Berlingske	5/6 stars
Gaffa	5/6 stars
Laut.de	4/5 stars
Metal Hammer	7/7 stars
Plattentests.de	8/10
Rock Hard	8/10
Soundvenue	4/6 stars

Goliath is an album by Danish band Kellermensch, released on 27 January 2017.

== Singles ==
On 18 November 2016, the band released the first single off the album "Bad Sign", with a lyric video released on the same day. It is notable that this is the first piece of new material since the release of the "Narcissus EP" in 2010. On 20 January 2017, the single "The Pain of Salvation" was released.

== Track listing ==
No.	Title	Length
1.	"Bad Sign"	3:24
2.	"The Pain of Salvation"	4:47
3.	"Atheist in a Foxhole"	4:34
4.	"Mediocre Man"	4:50
5.	"Remainder"	4:02
6.	"All That I Can Say"	2:34
7.	"Carrying My Name"	2:39
8.	"Lost at Sea"	4:31
9.	"Moth"	2:26
10.	"How to Get By"	3:11
Total length:		36:38

== Personnel ==
=== Kellermensch ===
- Sebastian Wolff – Vocals, guitar
- Anders Trans – Drums
- Christian Sinderman – Vocals, organ
- Jan V. Laursen – Guitar
- Claudio W. Suez – Bass
- John V. Laursen – Upright bass, guitar

=== Additional musicians ===
- Søren Storm – Violins on tracks 2, 3, 4, 5, 6, 7, 8 & 10
- Nils Gröndahl – Violins on tracks 1, 4, 5 & 9
- Inger Juhl Jensen – Cello on tracks 1 & 4

=== Production ===
- Sebastian & Kellermensch – Production & recording
- Sebastian Wolff – Mixing
- Jan Eliason – Mastering
- Jan V. Laursen – Photography

== Charts ==
Chart (2017)	Peak position
Danish Albums (Hitlisten)	9
