= The Wilted EP =

2026 EP by Paleface Swiss

EP by Paleface Swiss
- Released: 2 January 2026
- Genres: Beatdown hardcore; nu metalcore; deathcore; heavy metal
- Length: 13:03
- Label: Blood Blast Distribution

Paleface Swiss chronology
Cursed (2025)	The Wilted EP (2026)

Singles from The Wilted EP
- 1. "Instrument of War" Released: 30 September 2025; 2. "Let Me Sleep" Released: 21 October 2025; 3. "Everything Is Fine" Released: 2 December 2025; 4. "Withering Flower" Released: 2 January 2026

The Wilted EP is the third extended play (EP) by Swiss metal band Paleface Swiss, released on 2 January 2026 through Blood Blast Distribution. It followed the band's third studio album, Cursed, released in early 2025. It is also the band's final release with drummer Cassiano Toma before his departure in 2026.

== Background and promotion ==
The first song, a charity single titled "Instrument of War," was released on 30 September 2025 and featured Stick to Your Guns. The following single, "Let Me Sleep," was released along with the EP announcement on 21 October 2025. It was followed by another single, "Everything Is Fine," which was released on 2 December 2025. A music video for the song "Withering Flower" was released on 2 January 2026, coinciding with the EP release.

== Critical reception ==
Professional ratings
Review scores
Source	Rating
Blabbermouth	8/10
Distorted Sound	8/10

Blabbermouth gives the EP a score of 8 out of 10 and relates it to the band's latest release, the album Cursed, which was praised for its originality and disregard for genre boundaries; although the recordings feature the brutality of deathcore and metalcore, there is also an insidious addition of elements of alternative metal and post-grunge. With such a wide range, it would be a mistake to definitively associate the band with any metal subgenre. The evident mainstream approach, which incorporates melodic passages amid the band's overwhelming intensity, highlights Paleface's ability to flow between many styles without being tied to any one in particular.

Distorted Sound rated the EP 8/10 and described it as an extension of Paleface Swiss's success. The publication emphasized that the first three tracks have a visceral and energetic tone, characteristic of the band, while the final track, "Everything Is Fine," takes a more emotional and vulnerable approach, which has been little explored by the quartet.

Devolution highlights that the EP represented a stylistic shift for the band. Although they did not completely abandon deathcore, retaining central elements of the genre, Paleface Swiss presented a more diverse repertoire, with tracks that alternate between traditional deathcore, clean and emotional vocals, and a combination of both approaches.

== Track listing ==
All tracks are written by Paleface Swiss.

The Wilted EP track listing
No.	Title	Length
1.	"Intro"	0:23
2.	"Withering Flower"	3:15
3.	"Let Me Sleep"	2:39
4.	"Instrument of War"	3:09
5.	"Everything Is Fine"	3:37
Total length:		13:03

== Personnel ==
Paleface Swiss

- Marc "Zelli" Zellweger – vocals
- Yannick Lehmann – guitar
- Tommy Lee – bass
- Cassiano "Cassi" Toma – drums
