= Vexed (British band) =

British alternative metal band

- Origin: Hertfordshire, England
- Genres: Alternative metal; deathcore
- Years active: 2019–present
- Label: Napalm
- Members: Megan Targett; Willem Mason-Geraghty; Olly Hall
- Past members: Callan Hughes; Al Harper; Jay Bacon
- Website: vexedvexedvexed.com

Vexed are a British alternative metal band from Hertfordshire, formed in 2019.

== History ==
=== 2019: Formation and early singles ===
Vexed were formed on New Years Day 2019, by vocalist Megan Targett, guitarist Jay Bacon and drummer Willem Mason-Geraghty. All three members had played together in a band whose direction they had grown to dislike following numerous lineup changes; Targett said that she felt limited in what she could do as a female musician in the band, and as a result "didn’t have a lot of respect for the music or myself because none of it was genuine to me." After reaching a collective breaking point that almost led them to quit music altogether, they decided to form a new band together where they could write, wear, play and say whatever they wanted. Targett said that Vexed's name was inspired from the widespread use of the word in The Count of Monte Cristo, stating that she related with the word and her lyrics. The band's lineup originally featured guitarist Callan Hughes.

After the band's formation, Vexed began meeting up a couple of times a week to work on new material. In April 2019, Vexed self-released their debut single, "Elite", featuring then-Thy Art Is Murder vocalist CJ McMahon. The collaboration came about from Targett reaching out to McMahon on Instagram; he initially declined due to his busy schedule, but quickly changed his mind after listening to the music and recorded his parts for the song the following day. The song received over 500,000 streams across various platforms by 2021. In May 2019, they released their second single, "Dominate". In July 2019, Vexed performed their first ever show on the Fireball Whiskey stage of the UK Tech-Fest in Newark-on-Trent. (Note: Vexed were previously booked to perform a number of shows prior to the 2019 UK Tech-Fest, but they were cancelled "due to circumstances outside of [the band's] control", according to Tagrett. The band had been scheduled to play their debut headline show at the Black Heart in London on 28 June 2019; the venue was raided by the authorities before the band could take the stage.) The success of "Elite" brought Vexed to the attention of a promoter in Switzerland, leading the band to organize a tour of the country. Vexed recruited bassist Al Harper for the tour two weeks before it began; by its end, he had officially joined the band. In October 2019, the band toured the United Kingdom with In Depths.

=== 2020–2022: Culling Culture ===
In 2019, Vexed recorded on their debut album, Culling Culture, with producer and Exist Immortal frontman Meyrick de La Fuente. The album revolves around the idea of removing or "cancelling" negative individuals from one's life, and standing up for yourself. Targett has said that eight songs are based on a set individual, detailing "the experience[s] I went through, and now how I have absolutely nothing to do with them." Most of the bass parts on Culling Culture were written by de La Fuente, as Vexed did not have a bassist at the time; Harper joined as they were completing the album. Despite this, he learnt and played all of its bass parts and contributed to the writing of "Fake", the last song written and recorded for the album. In late 2019, Vexed signed with Tone Management, who shopped the band and the near-complete Culling Culture to various record labels. After a period of no interest, Napalm Records offered to release the album and Vexed subsequently signed with the label.

Vexed planned on releasing the album in 2020, but the COVID-19 pandemic forced the band to delay its release by eight months. The pandemic also led to the cancellation of a planned tour of Europe supporting Whitechapel and numerous festival appearances. In January 2021, Vexed announced their signing to Napalm and released Culling Culture on 21 May 2021, to generally positive reviews. Following the album's release, Vexed performed at the 2021 Bloodstock Open Air festival on the Sophie Lancaster stage, and embarked on a headlining tour of the United Kingdom in January 2022. The band also performed as an opening act for In Flames on their tour of the United Kingdom in March 2022, (Note: In Flames supporting tour: wookubus (24 January 2022). "Vexed And Defects Announced As Openers For In Flames' UK Tour". ThePRP.; Gaidelionyte, Dovalde (5 April 2022). "In Flames + Vexed + Defects @ Scala, London". Metal Rules.; Lowrey, Gavin (7 April 2022). "In Flames / Vexed / Defects @ Liquid Rooms, Edinburgh". Metal Rules.) and for Spiritbox on two London dates in June 2022.

=== 2023–present: Negative Energy ===
On the day of Culling Culture's release, Targett's grandfather was hospitalized with pulmonary fibrosis. Vexed was put on hiatus to allow her to care for him; he died three months later. The other members of the band also lost family members and loved ones after the album's release. The band attempted to work on new material in November 2021, but struggled with writer's block; Harper stepped back from writing after a year. Targett said that the band had tried to apply a positive "silver lining" to their songs due to the turmoil in their lives, but ultimately found it disingenuous. After eight months, they scrapped seven songs worth of material, saving only three or four riffs. The band eventually decided to write about how they truly felt, and wrote and recorded their second album, Negative Energy, in three months. Meyrick de La Fuente returned as producer and also played bass on the album in place of Harper.

Negative Energy features an overall heavier sound to their debut, reducing the use of clean vocals. Whilst primarily addressing the subject of mourning and loss, its also covers the music industry, religion, and mental health. The album was released on 23 June 2023 to positive reviews. Vexed embarked on a headlining tour of the United Kingdom in October 2023, supported by Pulse. In an interview in December, Targett said that Vexed had plans to release an extended play featuring material written during the COVID-19 lockdowns in 2024, which did not materialise. The band toured Europe with Cabal in January 2024, and toured the continent again supporting Carnifex in March and April.

Vexed parted ways with Napalm following the release of Negative Energy. In January and February 2025, Vexed toured Europe supporting Silent Planet, which was their first tour without label backing. The tour cost £34,000, of which the band were able to pay £20,000; they launched a GoFundMe and organized a raffle and giveaways to recoup the remaining costs. In August 2026, the band opened for Kittie for three shows in Germany.

== Musical style and influences ==
Vexed have been described as alternative metal and deathcore. The band's sound also features elements of djent, nu metal, hip-hop and grime. The band's influences include Emmure, King 810, Limp Bizkit, Megan Thee Stallion, Meshuggah, N.W.A., Thy Art Is Murder, and Veil of Maya. "Elite" was heavily inspired by Thy Art is Murder's Dear Desolation (2017), whilst Negative Energy was influenced more by non-metal artists such as The Prodigy, Sia, JME, Rico Nasty and Lorn.

== Band members ==
Current

- Megan Targett – vocals (2019–present)
- Willem Mason-Geraghty – drums (2019–present)
- Olly Hall – guitar (2025–present)

Session and live members

- Meyrick de La Fuente – bass (2023–present)

Former

- Callan Hughes – guitar (2019)
- Al Harper – bass (2019–2023)
- Jay Bacon – guitar (2019–2025)

== Discography ==
Studio albums

List of studio albums, with selected details
Title	Album details
Culling Culture	Released: 21 May 2021; Label: Napalm; Format: CD, LP, DD
Negative Energy	Released: 23 June 2023; Label: Napalm; Format: CD, LP, DD

Singles

List of singles
Title	Year	Album
"Elite" (featuring CJ McMahon)	2019	Non-album single
"Dominate"	2019	Non-album single
"Hideous"	2021	Culling Culture
"Epiphany"	2021	Culling Culture
"Misery"	2021	Culling Culture
"Fake"	2021	Culling Culture
"Anti-Fetish"	2023	Negative Energy
"X My <3 (Hope to Die)"	2023	Negative Energy
"Trauma Euphoria"	2023	Negative Energy
"Lay Down Your Flowers"	2023	Negative Energy
"It's Not the End"	2024	Negative Energy
