= The Resurrection of Lilith =

Studio album by Defacing God
- Released: 2 September 2022
- Studios: Hansen Studios (Ribe, Denmark)
- Genre: Melodic death metal
- Length: 49:02
- Label: Napalm Records
- Producer: Jacob Hansen

Defacing God chronology
The Resurrection of Lilith (2022)	Darkness Is My Crown (2026)

The Resurrection of Lilith is the debut studio album by Danish melodic death metal band Defacing God. The album was released on 2 September 2022 through Napalm Records and was produced by Jacob Hansen.

== Background ==
In 2015, singer Sandie Gjørtz and drummer Michael Olsson formed Defacing God. Two years later, the line-up was completed by guitarists Signar Petersen and Christian Nielsen, as well as bassist Rasmus Munch Nielsen.

On 12 August 2021, the Austrian label Napalm Records announced that it had signed Defacing God. The contract with Napalm Records came from the musicians who contacted the label shortly after the release of the music video for "Succumb the Euphoria". Napalm Records was interested in the group's concept and eventually began working with the band.

On 2 September 2022, Defacing God released their debut album The Resurrection of Lilith via Napalm Records. The original plan was to release The Resurrection of Lilith as an EP. Due to the COVID-19 pandemic, the concept of releasing the work in two to three EPs in quick succession was discarded and a full-fledged album was produced instead.

== Track listing ==
No.	Title	Length
1.	"Black Moon" (instrumental)	2:10
2.	"The Invocation Part I “Lilith”"	4:40
3.	"The Resurrection"	4:31
4.	"The Invocation Part II “Jezebel”"	3:06
5.	"The Invocation Part III “Abyzou”"	3:08
6.	"Rise of the Trinity"	4:38
7.	"The End of Times"	4:13
8.	"Echoes from Fulda"	4:29
9.	"Death Followed like a Plague"	4:07
10.	"Enslaved"	5:17
11.	"In the Land of Rain and Sorrow"	4:41
12.	"Into the Mist of Memories"	4:02
Total length:		49:02

== Personnel ==
=== Defacing God ===
- Sandie Gjørtz (Note: Credited as Sandie the Lillith.) – vocals
- Signar Petersen – lead guitar
- Christian Nielsen – rhythm guitar
- Rasmus "Kalke" Munch Nielsen – bass guitar
- Michael Olsson – drums

=== Additional personnel ===
- Jacob Hansen – production, mixing, mastering
- Péter Sallai – artwork
- Nikolaj Bransholm – photography
