= Kellermensch =

Danish rock band

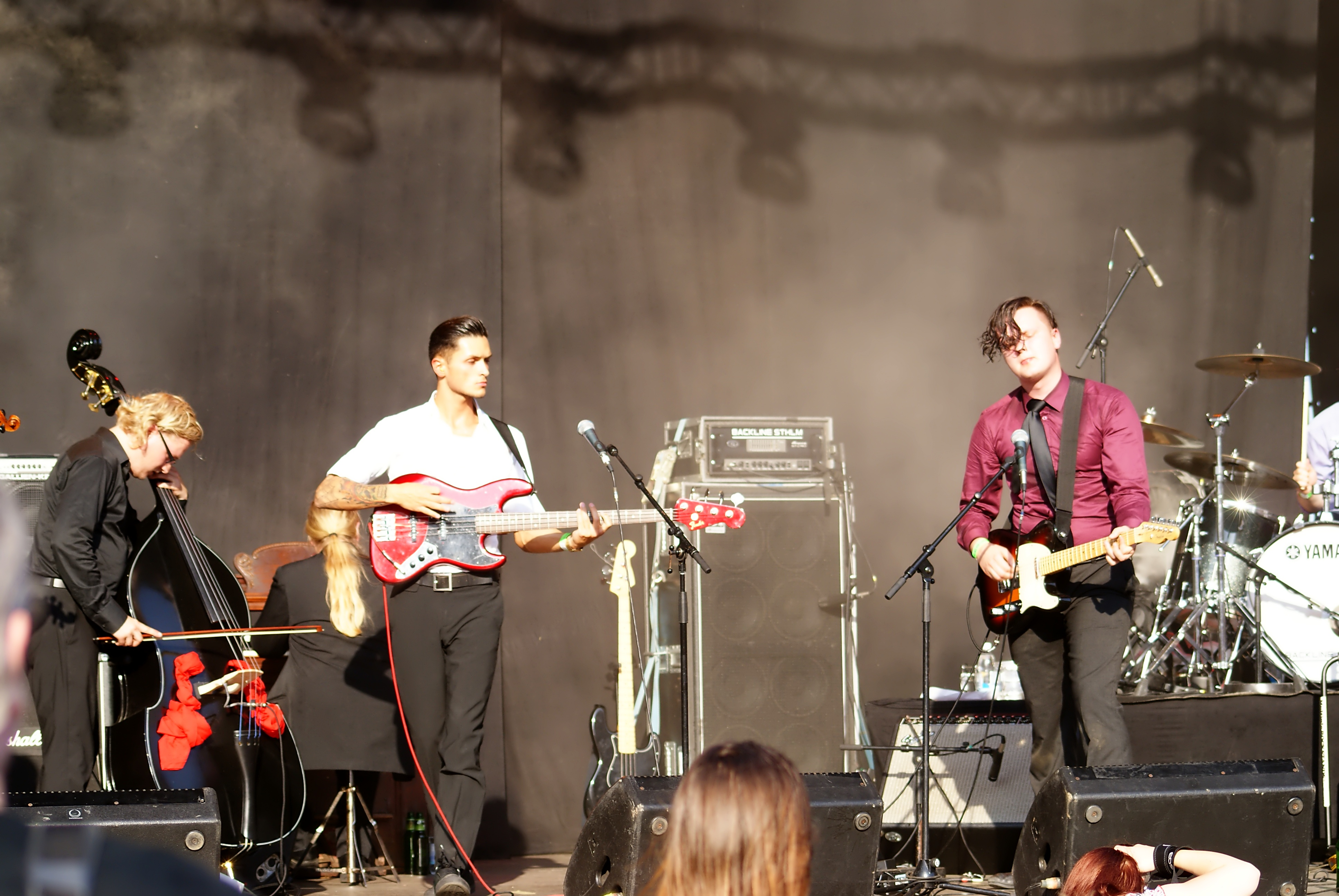
- Kellermensch performing in 2010

Background information
- Origin: Esbjerg, Denmark
- Genres: Experimental rock, alternative rock
- Years active: 2006–present
- Labels: Persona Non Grata, Universal
- Website: kellermensch.com

Kellermensch is a Danish rock band formed in Esbjerg in 2006. They started out under the name Brudevalsen (bridal waltz), taking their name from the German translation of Fyodor Dostoyevsky's novella Notes from Underground.

The band released their self-titled debut album in January 2009. In 2011, the band got a record deal with the Universal Music Group in Germany.

Kellermensch is the only band to play the heavy metal Copenhell festival and the folk music Tønder Festival.

== Members ==
- Christian Sindermann – vocals, pump organ
- Sebastian Wolff – guitar, vocals
- Jan V. Laursen – guitar
- Claudio Wolff Suez – bass guitar
- John V. Laursen – double bass, guitar
- Anders Trans – drums
- Mads Bjørn – keyboard, vocals (live)
- Nils Gröndahl – violin, viola (live)

== Discography ==
=== Albums ===
- Kellermensch (2009)
- Narcissus (2010)
- Kellermensch (2011)
- Goliath (2017)
- Capitulism (2022) – No. 16 Denmark

=== Singles ===
- "Moribund Town" (2010)
- "Black Dress / Rattle The Bones" (2011)
- "Bad Sign" (2017)
- "All That I Can Say" (2018)
- "Nothing" (2020)
- "Mission" (2020)
- "Another Drink" (2021)
