= Fear & Dagger =

2022 studio album by Paleface Swiss

Studio album by Paleface
- Released: 25 March 2022
- Genres: Beatdown hardcore; deathcore; nu metal
- Length: 66:51
- Label: Blood Blast Distribution

Paleface chronology
Chapter 3: The Last Selection (2020)	Fear & Dagger (2022)	Cursed (2025)

Singles from Fear & Dagger
- 1. "Dead Man's Diary" Released: 23 September 2021; 2. "Deathtouch" Released: 18 November 2021; 3. "The Orphan" Released: 3 March 2022; 4. "My Grave / Lay With Me" Released: 13 February 2023

Fear & Dagger is the second studio album by Swiss metal band Paleface Swiss, released on 25 March 2022 through Blood Blast Distribution. It is the band's last album to feature drummer Colin Hammond, and the band's last album released under the original name "Paleface", as in 2023 the group officially changed their name to Paleface Swiss to avoid confusion with musician Paleface.

== Background and promotion ==
The first single, "Dead Man's Diary," was released on 23 September 2021. It was later followed by two additional singles: "Deathtouch," released on 18 November 2021, and "The Orphan," which came out on 3 March 2022, shortly before the album's release. Later, a music video for "My Grave / Lay With Me" was released on 13 February 2023.

== Critical reception ==
Professional ratings
Review scores
Source	Rating
Metal Injection	7.5/10
New Transcendence	9/10
Wall of Sound	7/10

Metal Injection rated the album 7.5/10, noting its "almost comical" excess and the deliberate use of genre-referencing elements such as samples.

New Transcendence rated the recording 9 out of 10 and highlighted the thematic shift compared to previous releases, leaving behind the "cinematic" character and moving towards more introspective/emotional themes. Stylistically, however, the group still delivers an extreme intensity of deathcore, beatdown, and slam, having refined and matured their sound while remaining true to it.

Wall of Sound rated the album a 7 out of 10 and called it "an unashamedly brutal and angry album," emphasizing the robust 16-track set and the flawless production, but also noting the excessive aggression that makes it "a slightly challenging album to get through about halfway in."

Metal.de stated that the recording presents a continuation of previous releases; it deals with dark themes and is fundamentally based on beatdown hardcore, with clear traces of nu metal and thrash, in a diffuse yet cohesive combination. Powermetal criticized the excessive brutality, which nevertheless highlighted the technically impeccable production by the standards of the genre.

== Track listing ==
All tracks are written by Paleface Swiss.

Fear & Dagger track listing
No.	Title	Length
1.	"666"	1:48
2.	"Pain"	2:10
3.	"Suppressing Times"	3:03
4.	"Make a Deal With the Devil"	4:45
5.	"Deathtouch"	3:22
6.	"Nail to the Tooth"	3:40
7.	"Dead Man's Diary" (featuring Flo Salfati of Landmvrks)	4:40
8.	"God Looks the Other Way"	6:12
9.	"Chaos Theory" (featuring Tyler Shelton of Traitors)	2:43
10.	"The Orphan"	6:24
11.	"My Grave / Lay With Me"	3:44
12.	"Hellhole" (featuring Bobak Raffiee of Justice for the Damned)	4:04
13.	"No Room Left in Hell"	4:45
14.	"Bite the Curb"	2:25
15.	"Fear & Dagger"	6:27
16.	"Judgment Day"	6:55
Total length:		66:51

== Personnel ==
Paleface Swiss

- Marc "Zelli" Zellweger – vocals
- Yannick Lehmann – guitar
- Tommy Lee – bass
- Colin "CJ" Hammond – drums
