= Hollow Front =

American metalcore band

- Origin: Grand Rapids, Michigan
- Genres: Metalcore; progressive metalcore; post-hardcore
- Years active: 2016–present
- Label: UNFD
- Members: Tyler Tate; Lee Albrecht; Frankie Mish; Davion Cuttler; Dakota Alvarez
- Past members: Brandon Rummler; Devin Attard; Cody Davis; Jordan Stewart; Josh McCormack
- Website: hollowfrontmerch.com

Hollow Front is an American metalcore band from Grand Rapids, Michigan, formed in 2016. The band currently consists of vocalist Tyler Tate, guitarists Lee Albrecht and Dakota Alvarez, drummer Frankie Mish, and bassist Davion Cuttler.

== History ==
Formed in 2016, the band announced they had signed to Beckwith Records and released their debut EP Homewrecker in 2017, followed by the standalone single Chameleon in August that year. Their debut album, titled Still Life, was released in 2018. In 2020, they released their second studio album Loose Threads. on UNFD. They next released their third studio album The Price of Dreaming in 2022. That year, the band was involved in a bus accident, with Davion Cuttler suffering a clavicle injury. On April 27, 2022 the band announced that drummer Devin Attard had left the band.

On October 27, 2023, they released their fourth album, The Fear of Letting Go. The album included singles "Letting Go", "We're All Left Suffering", "Breaking Teeth", and "Will I Run". Two of the songs on the album still featured former guitarist and clean vocalist Dakota Alvarez despite his departure from the band in 2023.

On June 11, 2024, Hollow Front released single, "Save Yourself". On September 3, they released "Hold Me Down". On October 22, they released "Cast Out".

On January 30, 2026, Hollow Front released a single and accompanying music video "To the Ashes".

== Band members ==
Current

- Tyler Tate - lead vocals (2016–present)
- Lee Albrecht - guitar (2021–present)
- Frankie Mish - drums, clean vocals (2024–present)
- Davion Cuttler - bass (2024–present)
- Dakota Alvarez - guitar, clean vocals (2018–2023, 2026–present)

Former

- Brandon Rummler - bass (2016–2023)
- Devin Attard - drums (2019–2022)
- Cody Davis - drums (2016–2019)
- Jordan Stewart - guitar (2016–2018)
- Josh McCormack - guitar (2016–2017)

Timeline

== Discography ==
=== Albums ===
- Still Life (2018)
- Loose Threads (2020)
- The Price of Dreaming (2022)
- The Fear of Letting Go (2023)
- No Love Without Despair (2026)

=== EPs ===
- Homewrecker (2017)

=== As a Featured Artist ===
- "There's Nothing Holdin' Me Back" (Shawn Mendes cover) by Another October (2017)
- "Labrat" by Villain of the Story (2020)
- "The Mire" by Trash All Nations (2023)
- "Sleepwalking" by Never Back Down (2023)
- "What Slept Beneath Tarvos" (feat. Left to Suffer and Hollow Front) by The Wise Man's Fear (2024)
- "IVY" by Love Like Enemies (2024)
- "Hibbertia (Reduxe)" by Patient Sixty-Seven (2024)
- "Hospital Bed" by Daze of June (2024)
- "Protohuman" by Dal Av (2025)
- "Treachery" by TRVLRS (2026)
