= Defacing God =

Danish melodic death metal band

- Origin: Aalborg, Denmark
- Genres: Melodic death metal
- Years active: 2015-present
- Label: Napalm Records
- Members: Sandie Gjørtz; Jakob Batten; Christian Nielsen; Rasmus "Kalke" Munch Nielsen; Michael Olsson

Defacing God is a melodic death metal band from Aalborg, Denmark, formed in 2015.

== History ==
In 2015, singer Sandie Gjørtz and drummer Michael Olsson formed Defacing God. Two years later, the line-up was completed by guitarists Signar Petersen and Christian Nielsen, as well as bassist Rasmus Munch Nielsen. Except for Gjørtz and guitarist Nielsen, the other musicians played in various groups.

In 2019 and 2020, two singles, "The Marked Ones" and "Succumb the Euphoria", were released by Defacing God without a label. On 12 August 2021, the Austrian label Napalm Records announced that it had signed the group. The contact with Napalm Records came from the musicians who contacted the label shortly after the release of the music video for Succumb the Euphoria. Napalm Records was interested in the group's concept and eventually began working with the band.

On 2 September 2022, Defacing God released their debut album The Resurrection of Lilith via Napalm Records. The original plan was to release The Resurrection of Lilith as an EP. Due to the COVID-19 pandemic, the concept of releasing the work in two to three EPs in quick succession was discarded and a full-fledged album was produced instead. The band played at Copenhell for the first time in summer 2023. A European tour followed in November as opening act for Krisiun.

Lead guitarist, Signar Petersen left the band in early 2024, citing personal priorities and a lack of drive for composing new songs as the main reasons. Shortly after, Jacob Batten of Illdisposed entered the band as the new lead guitarist.

Sandie Gjørtz and Jacob Batten were married on September 27th, 2025.

On 22 January 2026, the band announced they had signed with Apostasy Records and their second album, Darkness Is My Crown, which was released on 27 March.

== Musical style ==
In an interview with Stefan Popp for the online magazine Metal1.info in 2022, Gjørtz explained that they initially experimented with different styles of music, but mainly focused on melodic death metal. According to Popp, the music on The Resurrection of Lilith sounds like a mixture of Dimmu Borgir, Naglfar, Satyricon and Arch Enemy.

Jannik Kleemann from Metal.de also recognizes musical similarities to Arch Enemy and identifies them based on the singer Sandie Gjørtz. According to Kleemann, there is also an orchestral and symphonic level, which, however, has a more supportive effect. Based on this, Kleemann also identifies groups such as Fleshgod Apocalypse and Ex Deo as musical references.

When asked about the inspiration for her lyrics, Gjørtz replied that she is influenced by films, books, occult, history, folklore and witchcraft. They also visit abandoned places, cemeteries or museums with grotesque or dark themes. Kleemann writes that the songs are, among other things, about occult female power, with the mythological figures of Lilith, Jezebel and Abyzou being brought to the fore, which ultimately results in the song Rise of the Trinity. Florian Blumann sees a feminist message in some texts, for example in the song Resurrection. According to Blumann, the themes of occultism and the burning witches can also be perfectly transferred to today.

== Discography ==
=== Studio albums ===
List of studio albums, with selected details
Title	Details
The Resurrection of Lilith	Released: 2 September 2022; Label: Napalm Records; Formats: CD, Digital download, streaming
Darkness Is My Crown	Released: 27 March 2026; Label: Apostasy Records; Formats: CD, Digital download, streaming
