= Cursed (Paleface Swiss album) =

2025 studio album by Paleface Swiss

- Original edition cover (Note: On The Complete Edition, the cover art uses a flowery background.)

Studio album by Paleface Swiss
- Released: 3 January 2025
- Genre: Beatdown hardcore; nu metalcore; deathcore
- Length: 48:01
- Label: Blood Blast Distribution

Paleface Swiss chronology
Fear & Dagger (2022)	Cursed (2025)	The Wilted EP (2026)

Singles from Cursed
- 1. "Best Before: Death" Released: 1 March 2023; 2. "Please End Me" Released: 14 June 2023; 3. "The Gallow" Released: 31 October 2023; 4. "Hatred" Released: 26 September 2024; 5. "My Blood on Your Hands" Released: 7 November 2024; 6. "Love Burns" Released: 4 December 2024; 7. "River of Sorrows" Released: 3 January 2025; 8. "River of Sorrows (Unplugged)" Released: 7 May 2025; 9. "I Am a Cursed One" Released: 3 June 2025

Cursed (The Complete Edition)
- Artwork used for The Complete Edition cover

Cursed is the third album by the Swiss metal band Paleface Swiss, released on 3 January 2025 through Blood Blast Distribution. It is the band's only album to feature drummer Cassiano Toma, and the band's first album to be released under the name Paleface Swiss as the band had to rename due to there being another artist under the name of Paleface.

== Background and promotion ==
The first single, titled "Hatred", was released on 26 September 2024 along with the album announcement. It was followed by two more singles, "My Blood on Your Hands", and "Love Burns", which were released on 7 November 2024 and 4 December 2024. A music video for the song "River of Sorrows" was released on 3 January 2025 coinciding with the album release. An expanded edition, Cursed (The Complete Edition), was released on 4 June 2025, and the singles "I Am a Cursed One", "Best Before: Death", "Please End Me", "The Gallow" and "River of Sorrows (Unplugged)" were included. The album was named as one of the most anticipated metal albums of 2025 by Loudwire.

== Critical reception ==
Professional ratings
Review scores
Source	Rating
Kerrang!	3/5
Metal Injection	6.5/10

Cursed drew a mixed critical reception: Kerrang! characterized the recording as an uneven throwback that pairs "unhinged brutality" with nu-metal revivalism and awarded it a 3/5 score; while Metal Injection gave the album a 6.5 out of 10 and framed it as a recording that showcases the band's strengths even as it suffers from lapses in cohesion.

== Track listing ==
All tracks are written by Paleface Swiss.

Cursed track listing
No.	Title	Length
1.	"Un Pobre Niño Murió"	1:44
2.	"Hatred"	3:03
3.	"...and With Hope You'll Be Damned"	3:29
4.	"Don't You Ever Stop"	3:19
5.	"Enough?"	3:27
6.	"Youth Decay"	3:34
7.	"My Blood on Your Hands"	1:40
8.	"Love Burns"	4:15
9.	"River of Sorrows"	4:02
Total length:		28:33

Cursed (The Complete Edition) track listing
No.	Title	Length
10.	"I Am a Cursed One"	3:21
11.	"Best Before: Death"	3:33
12.	"Please End Me"	3:11
13.	"The Gallow"	4:58
14.	"River of Sorrows (Unplugged)"	4:25
Total length:		48:01

== Personnel ==
Paleface Swiss

- Marc "Zelli" Zellweger – vocals
- Yannick Lehmann – guitar
- Tommy Lee – bass
- Cassiano "Cassi" Toma – drums

== Charts ==
Chart performance for Cursed
Chart (2025)	Peak position
German Albums (Offizielle Top 100)	50
