= Apparatus (song) =

Single by Bombus
- B-side: "Biblical"
- Released: 6 May 2013
- Genre: Heavy metal
- Length: 2:58
- Songwriter(s): Peter Asp, Fredrik Berglund, Matthias Jacobsson, Ulf Lundén, Jonas Rydberg

Bombus singles chronology
"A Safe Passage" (2011)	"Apparatus" (2013)

"Apparatus" is a song by Swedish heavy metal band Bombus, it was released as a single from their second studio album The Poet and the Parrot, on digital download and on 7" vinyl limited to 500 copies.

== Track listing ==
All lyrics are written by Bombus; all music is composed by Bombus

Single
No.	Title	Length
1.	"Apparatus"	2:58
2.	"Biblical"	5:21
Total length:		8:19

== Music video ==
The music video, released on 8 May 2013, features the band drive to a pub to perform the song, in the crowded bar area, brawls between the pub patrons occur during their performance.

== Personnel ==
- Feffe – Guitars, vocals
- Matte – Guitars, vocals
- Peter – Drums
- Jonas – Bass
