= The Poet and the Parrot =

Studio album by Bombus
- Released: 26 May 2013
- Genre: Heavy metal
- Length: 40:10
- Label: Century Media

Bombus chronology
Bombus (2010)	The Poet and the Parrot (2013)

Professional ratings
Review scores
Source	Rating
Metal-Temple	8/10 stars
Metal Hammer Norway	7/10 stars

The Poet and the Parrot is the second full-length album by Swedish heavy metal band Bombus. It was released on 26 August 2013 by Century Media Records and is available on download, CD and vinyl format.

== Track listing ==
No.	Title	Length
1.	"Enter the Night"	03:02
2.	"The Poet and the Parrot"	07:10
3.	"Liars"	05:10
4.	"A Safe Passage"	04:13
5.	"Apparatus"	02:58
6.	"Let Her Die"	04:18
7.	"Master the Reality"	05:32
8.	"Into the Fire"	07:20
Total length:		40:10

Limited Edition Digipak Bonus Tracks
No.	Title	Length
9.	"Styx"	04:57
10.	"Cut Deep"	03:26
Total length:		48:33

== Personnel ==
- Feffe – Guitars, vocals
- Matte – Guitars, vocals
- Peter – Drums
- Jonas – Bass
