= Tysk Hudindustri =

Studio album by Red Warszawa
- Released: 2000
- Recorded: 1999–2000
- Genre: Punk metal, comedy rock
- Length: 53 minutes
- Label: Majonaise Studio
- Producer: Heavy-Henning

Red Warszawa chronology
Skal Vi Lege Doktor? (1998)	Tysk Hudindustri (2000)	Live aus Kaiser Bierwurst Halle (2001)

Tysk Hudindustri (transl. German Flesh Industry) is the third studio album from the Danish heavy metal band Red Warszawa. The album has the under-title "Greatest Hits 1986–2000 Volume 3".

== Track listing ==
1. Heavy for dig (Heavy for you)
2. Amok
3. KKK-Salat (KKK-Salad)
4. Pludselig Får Du Et Cirkelspark Af Folk Du Ikke Kender (Suddenly you get roundhouse kicked by people you don't know)
5. Der Vil Altid Være en Straf (There will always be a punishment)
6. Tråkker (Trucker – but intentionally misspelled with a Danish 'å')
7. Bilerne ud af Byen (The cars out of town)
8. Tror Du det er For Sjov Jeg Drikker (Do you think I drink for fun)
9. EPO-Sangen (The EPO-song)
10. Æggemad (Egg-sandwich)
11. Brun (Brown)
12. Wie Dumm Kann Mann Sein (German for 'How stupid can you be')
13. Prost (German for 'Cheers')
14. Narko og Porno (Drugs and Porn)
15. Beige
16. Hesteviskeren (The Horse Whisperer)
17. Svensk/Finsk Løsning (Swedish/Finnish Solution)
18. Messermann (German for 'Knife Man')

Bonus track: BBBMPVHNK

== Cover ==
Cover
