= Baest =

Danish death metal band

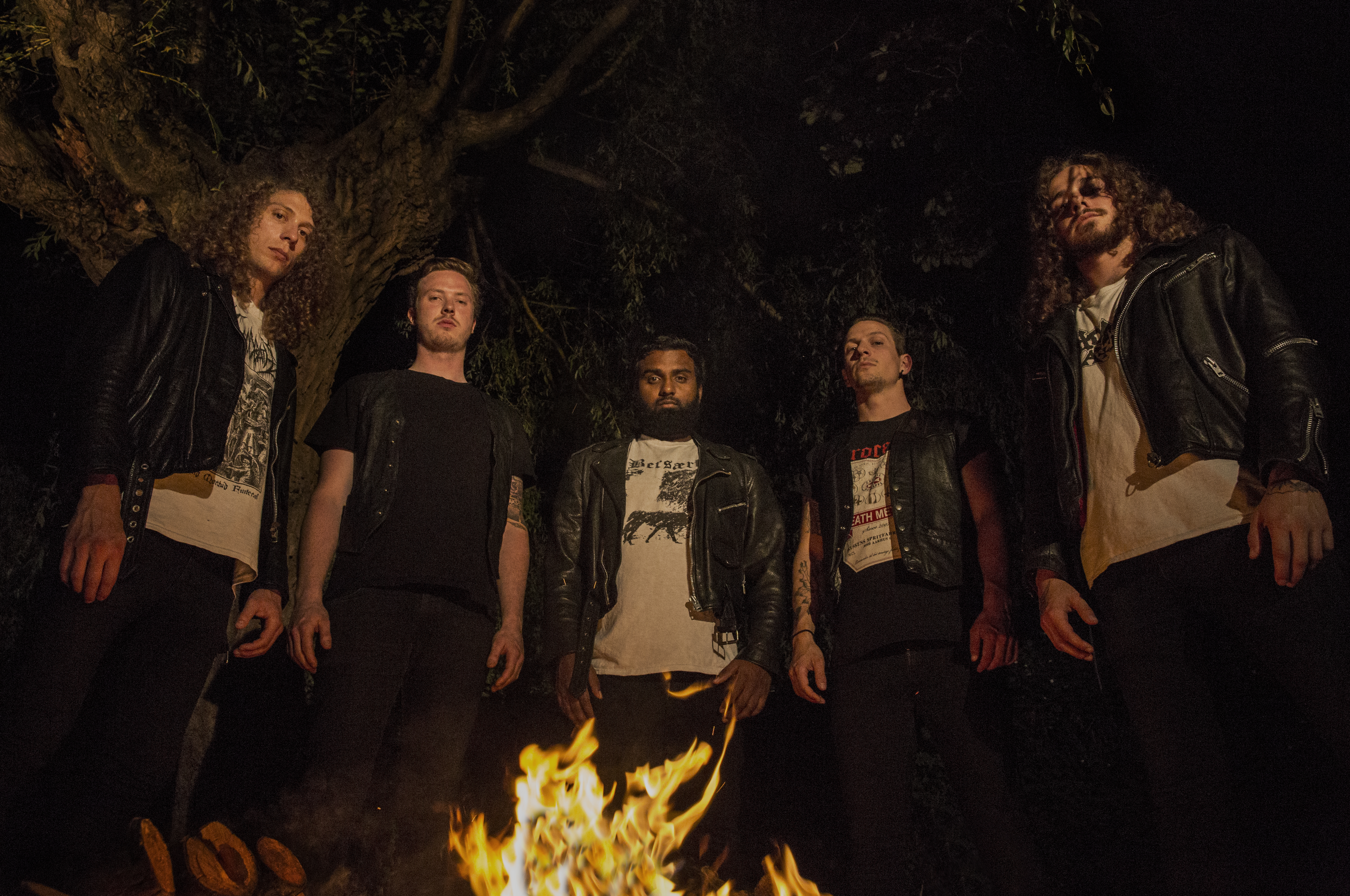
- Baest in 2016

Background information
- Also known as: Bæst
- Origin: Aarhus, Denmark
- Genres: Death metal
- Years active: 2015–present
- Labels: Century Media Records
- Members: Mattias Melchiorsen; Sebastian Abildsten; Lasse Revsbech; Svend Karlsson; Simon Olsen
- Website: baestband.com

Baest is a Danish death metal band formed in 2015 in Aarhus. Their name was initially spelled Bæst, the Danish word for "beast" or "brute". Since signing to Century Media Records in March 2018, the band has released four studio albums: Danse Macabre (2018), Venenum (2019), Necro Sapiens (2021), and Colossal (2025).

== Band members ==
- Lasse Revsbech – guitars
- Svend Karlsson – guitars
- Simon Olsen – vocals
- Mattias Melchiorsen – bass
- Sebastian Abildsten – drums

== Discography ==
Studio albums

- Danse Macabre (2018)
- Venenum (2019)
- Necro Sapiens (2021)
- Colossal (2025)

Extended plays

- Marie Magdalene (2016)
- Justitia (2022)

Singles

- Demo (2016)
