= De 4 Årstider i Nordvest =

De 4 Årstider I Nordvest

Studio album by Red Warszawa
- Released: 29 March 2010
- Recorded: 2009–2010
- Genres: Punk metal, Comedy rock
- Length: 52:08
- Label: Gusten Fætter Records
- Producer: "Heavy" Henning Nymand

Red Warszawa chronology
My Poland Collection (2006)	De 4 Årstider I Nordvest (2010)

Singles from De 4 Årstider I Nordvest
- 1. "Jarmers Plads" Released: 22 February 2010

De 4 Årstider I Nordvest (Danish for "The 4 Seasons In Northwest") is the Danish Heavy metal band Red Warszawa's sixth studio album. The album is under titled "Gretes Tits 1986–2010".

== Track listing ==
1. "Sut Den Onde Numse" (Teat The Evil Butt)
2. "De 4 Årstider I Nordvest" (The 4 Seasons in Nordvest)
3. "Karry" (Curry)
4. "Gratis Pikkemand" (Free Pecker)
5. "Rapanden Rasmus" (The Rapduck Rasmus)
6. "Stram Dressur" (Tight Dressage)
7. "Vi Er Generation Der Ikke Må Heile" (We Are the Generation Which May Not Hail)
8. "Benzin I Blodet" (Gasoline in the Blood)
9. "Skimlers Liste" (Skimlers List)
10. "Brøndby Strand" (Broendby Beach)
11. "Spil Den Med Satan" (Play the One With Satan)
12. "Drikke Rikke" (Drinking Rikke)
13. "Jarmers Plads" (Jarmers Place)
14. "Osama Har Vundet" (Osama Has Won)
15. "Vågn Op" (Wake Up)
16. "Begravelsesforretningen" (The Funeral Store)
17. "Homometeret" (The Homo-O-meter)

== Trivia ==
The under title "Gretes Tits" is a Danish joke. The other albums Red Warszawa has made are under titled "Greatest Hits". In Danish, Grete is a name.

== Personnel ==
"Lækre" Jens Mondrup – "Vocals"
"Heavy" Henning Nymand – Guitar, Bass, producer
Morten "Måtten Møbelbanker" Nielsen – Drums
