= Siamese (band) =

Danish rock band

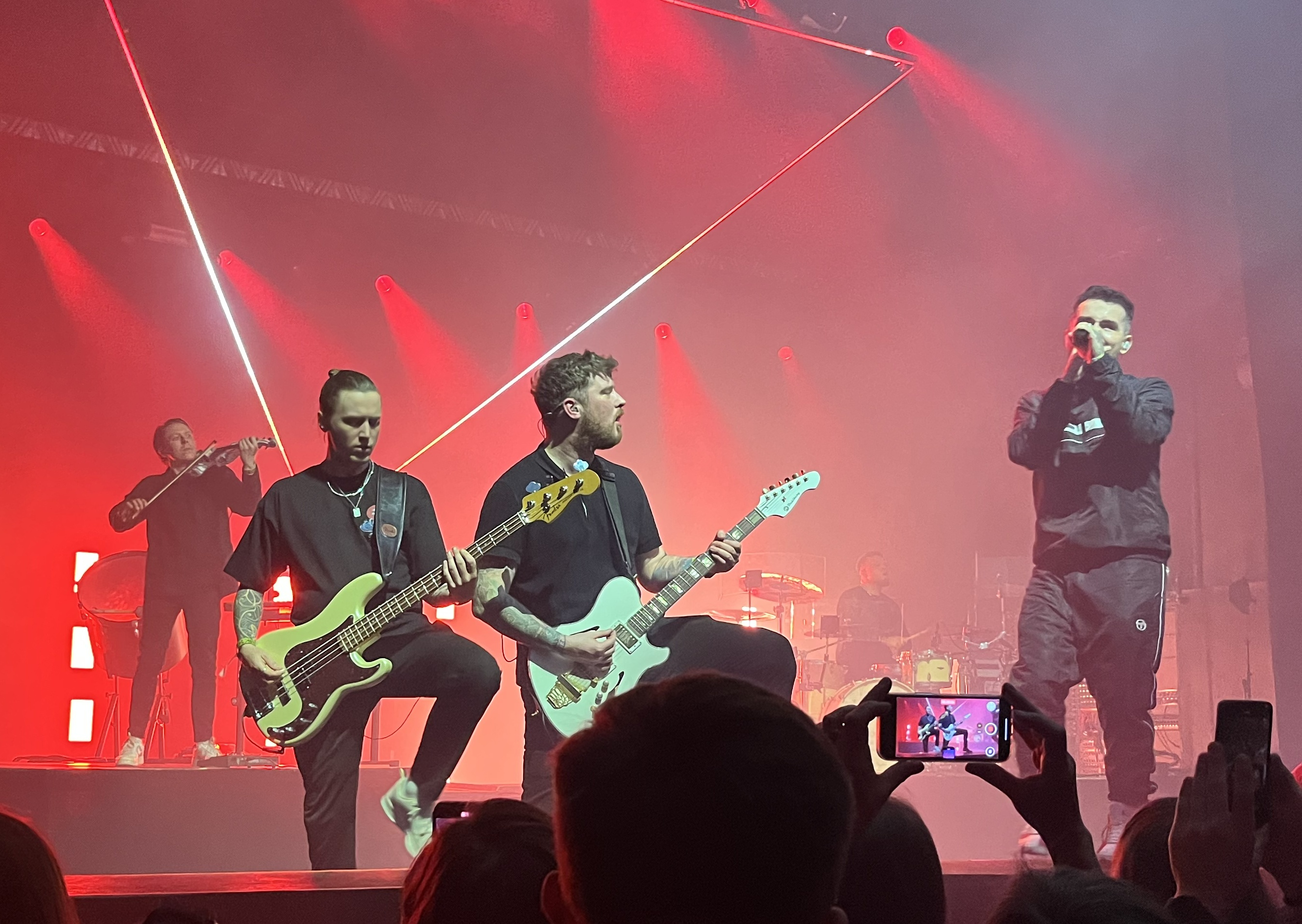
- Danish music artist Siamese live at Store Vega in Copenhagen on December 5th, 2024

Background information
- Also known as: Siamese Fighting Fish (until 2014)
- Origin: Denmark
- Genres: Alternative rock, alternative metal
- Years active: 2011–present
- Labels: Mighty Music; Target Distribution; Artery Recordings
- Members: Andreas Kruger; Mirza Radonjica; Christian Hjort Lauritzen; Joakim Stilling; Marc Nommesen
- Past members: Jakob Hoppermann; Morten Bo Harris; Rasmus Krøyer; Villads Berg

Siamese (initially named Siamese Fighting Fish) is a Danish rock band, formed in 2011. The group is currently composed of guitarist Andreas Kruger, vocalist Mirza Radonjica, violinist Christian Hjort Lauirtzen, drummer Joakim Stilling and bassist Marc Nommesen.

== History ==
They released their critically acclaimed debut album We Are the Sound on 31 January 2011 followed by a tour of Denmark, Sweden, Germany, Benelux and Italy. Their second album, Breathe:See:Move, was released on 20 August 2012 with "The World Might Have Seen Better Days" being the first single from the album. In 2014, the band changed its name from Siamese Fighting Fish to Siamese. On 19 January 2015, the band released a self-titled album, Siamese, funded via an Indiegogo crowdfunding campaign. In 2017, Siamese signed to Artery Recordings and released its fourth studio album, Shameless.

== Discography ==
=== Albums ===
Year	Album	Chart peak (DEN)	Certification
2011	We Are the Sound	–	
2012	Breathe:See:Move	8	
2015	Siamese		
2017	Shameless		
2019	Super Human		
2021	Home		
2024	Elements		
2026	dissolution		
