= Hævi Mætal og Hass =

Studio album by Red Warszawa
- Released: 1996
- Recorded: 1995–1996
- Genre: Crossover thrash, hardcore punk, thrash metal, comedy rock
- Length: 74 minutes
- Label: Gusten Fætter Records
- Producer: Lars Schmidt

Red Warszawa chronology
Hævi Mætal og Hass (1996)	Skal Vi Lege Doktor? (1998)

Professional ratings
Review scores
Source	Rating
Gaffa	6/6 stars

Hævi Mætal og Hass (English: Heavy Metal and Hash, in slang) is the Danish Heavy metal band Red Warszawa's first studio album. The album is under titled "Greatest Hits 1986–1996 Volume 1".

== Name ==
"Hævi Mætal og Hass" is not correct Danish spelling, but it is pronounced like that if you speak with Copenhagen accent. When you say "Heavy" in Danish the "ea" sounds like an "æ". In correct Danish the title would be "Heavy Metal og Hash".

== Track listing ==
1. "Sten og Trille" (rock and roll)
2. "Hurra Skolen Brænder" (Hooray, The School's Burning )
3. "Mosekonen Brygger" (The Bogwoman Brews)
4. "Norsk Black Metal" (Norwegian Black Metal)
5. "Heavy Metal og Hass"
6. "Analfabet" (Illiterate)
7. "Lugter af Fisk" (Smells like Fish)
8. "Børn er Dumme og Grimme" (Kids are Stupid and Ugly)
9. "Aldi"
10. "Singelingeling"
11. "Ticeman Control"
12. "Dødshimlen" (Deathheaven)
13. "Jeg Hader Alle Mennesker" (I Hate Everyone)
14. "Har Du Nogen Venner" (Do You Have Any Friends)
15. "Narkoøgle" (Druglizard)
16. "Søren Autonom" (Søren Autonomic)
17. "Den Sorte Sang" (The Black Song)
18. "2 Slags Geddar " (Two Kinds of Guitar [mangled])
19. "Den Dystra Staden " (The Gloomy Town)
20. "Bagermester Jensen" (Baker Jensen)
21. "Hestepik" (Horsedick)

== Track info ==
=== Aldi ===
Aldi is a German supermarket. The song is in German.

=== Ticeman Control ===
"Ticeman" is a word made up by the band members. It is a faux-Anglicization of the word "tissemand", a colloquial term for penis.

=== Den Dystra Staden ===
This song is not in Danish, but in Swedish.

== Personnel ==
- "Lækre" Jens Mondrup – Vocals
- "Heavy" Henning Nymand – Guitar
- "Tonser" Henrik – Bass
- Jan Wiegandt – Drums
- Lars Schmidt – Producer
