= Bombus (album) =

Studio album by Bombus
- Released: 26 May 2010
- Genre: Heavy metal
- Length: 38:35
- Label: Mourningwood Recordings

Bombus chronology
Bombus (2010)	The Poet and the Parrot (2013)

Bombus is the first full-length album by Swedish heavy metal band Bombus. It was released on 26 May 2010 by Mourningwood Recordings.

== Track listing ==
No.	Title	Length
1.	"Biblical"	05:21
2.	"Outsider"	04:03
3.	"Hairy Teeth"	05:34
4.	"Hud"	03:41
5.	"Raised by Pigs"	02:47
6.	"Darkened Matters"	05:05
7.	"Bigger Fish to Fry"	04:49
8.	"Walden III"	05:39
9.	"Castles in the Air"	01:39

== Personnel ==
- Feffe – Guitars, vocals
- Matte – Guitars, vocals
- Peter – Drums
- Ulf – Bass
