= Paleface Swiss =

Swiss metal band

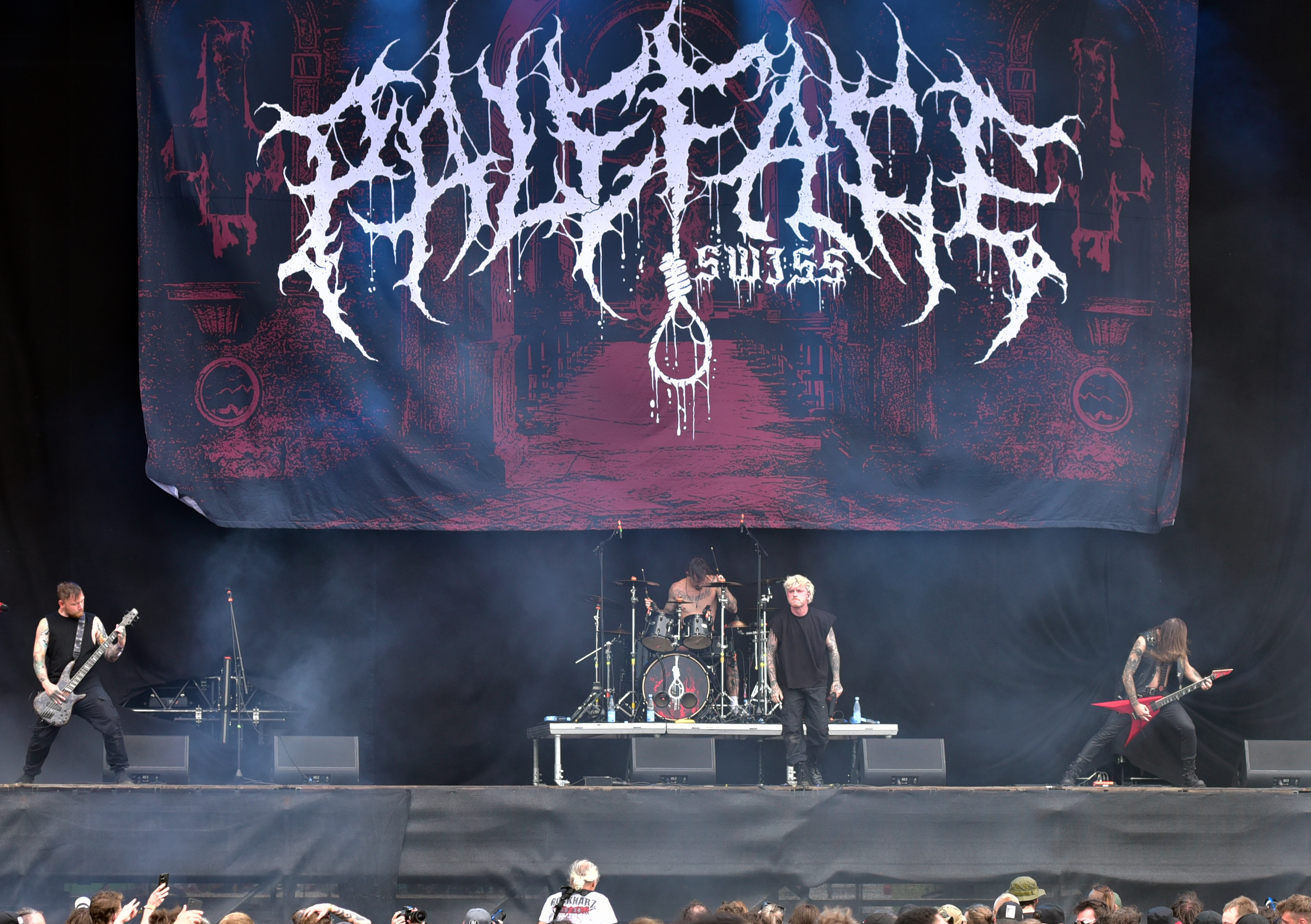
- Paleface Swiss live at Reload Festival in 2024

Background information
- Also known as: Paleface (2017–2022)
- Origin: Zürich, Switzerland
- Genres: Beatdown hardcore; deathcore; nu metal
- Years active: 2017–present
- Label: Blood Blast Distribution
- Members: Marc Zellweger; Yannick Lehmann; Tommy Lee; Luigi Paraventi
- Past members: Colin Hammond; Cassiano Toma
- Website: palefaceswiss.com

Paleface Swiss is a Swiss metal band formed in 2017 in Zürich. The band's lineup currently consists of vocalist Marc "Zelli" Zellweger, guitarist Yannick Lehmann, bassist Tommy Lee and drummer Luigi Paraventi. The band has released three studio albums and three EPs, with their latest being Cursed and The Wilted EP, released through Blood Blast Distribution on 3 January 2025 and 2 January 2026, respectively. They marked a continuation of their recent rise in prominence.

== History ==
The band formed in 2017 under the name of Paleface. They released their debut EP, Chapter 1: From the Gallows, the following year and the follow-up, Chapter 2: Witch King, in 2019. In May 2020, they were set to release their third EP, Chapter 3: The Last Selection, but because of the COVID-19 pandemic, the release was postponed; however, instead of an EP, the band released it as a full-length debut album. In 2022, they released their second album, Fear & Dagger, which was met with positive reception. In 2023, the band announced that they had renamed to "Paleface Swiss" due to there being another artist named "Paleface"; that same year, the band released several standalone singles, including "Best Before: Death", "Please End Me", and "The Gallow", among others. Vocalist Marc Zelli was featured on Left to Suffer's 2024 single titled "Lost in the Dark". The band's third studio album titled Cursed was released on 3 January 2025.

According to Metal Hammer, the band experienced a major breakout in 2024, gaining broader international attention for its extremely heavy blend of deathcore, hardcore, nu metal and thrash, drawing comparisons to early Slipknot. The band began performing live only in 2022 but quickly became known for chaotic, high-energy shows, with packed tours and appearances at festivals such as Resurrection Fest and Sick New World. During their U.S. tour, they replaced the opening act with an extreme wrestling match refereed by Marc "Zelli" Zellweger. In an interview with Metal Hammer, Marc stated that the band performs every show "at the limit", something that the crowd "definitely feels".

On 21 October 2025 the band announced an EP called The Wilted, which was released on 2 January 2026.

== Musical style and influences ==
Critics have categorized Paleface Swiss' music as beatdown hardcore, deathcore and nu metal. Despite this, the band avoids directly associating itself with any specific metal subgenre, exhibiting a fluidity that makes it difficult to pigeonhole.

Paleface have cited influences including Slipknot, Korn, the Amity Affliction, NF, Nickelback, Nothing but Thieves, Bullet for My Valentine, Trivium, Iron Maiden and Judas Priest.

== Band members ==
Paleface Swiss live at Reload Festival 2024

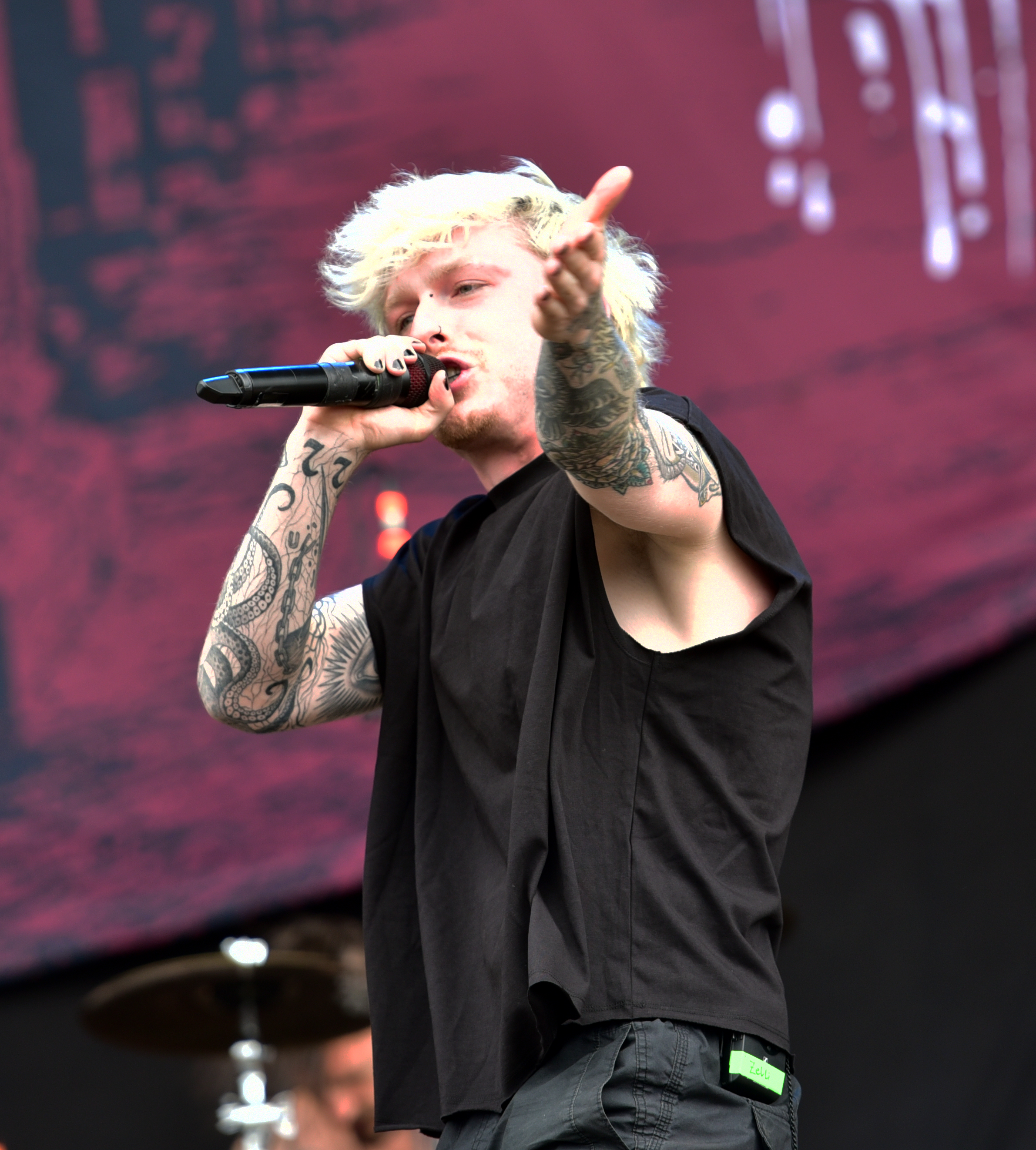
Marc "Zelli" Zellweger

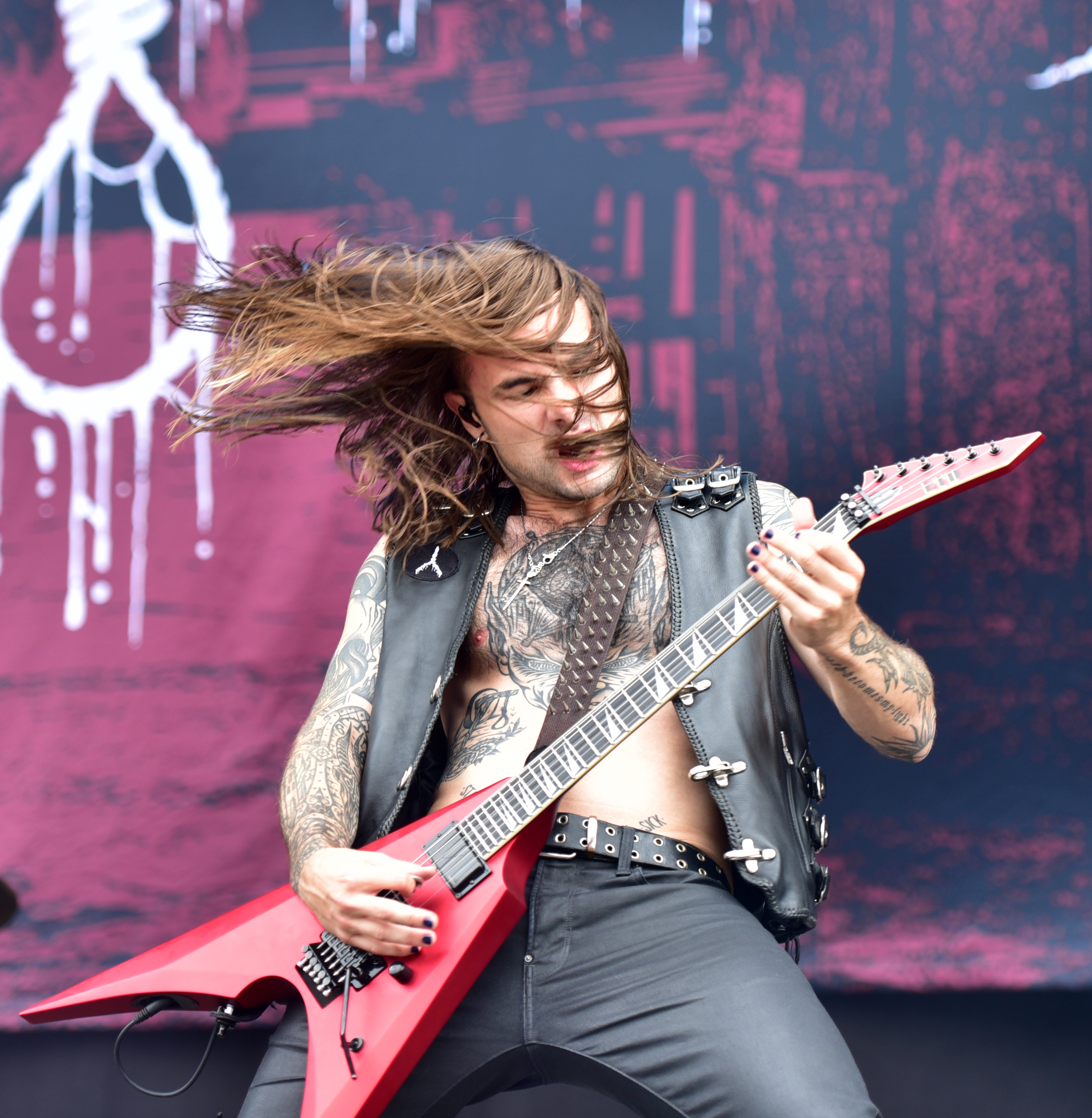
Yannick Lehmann

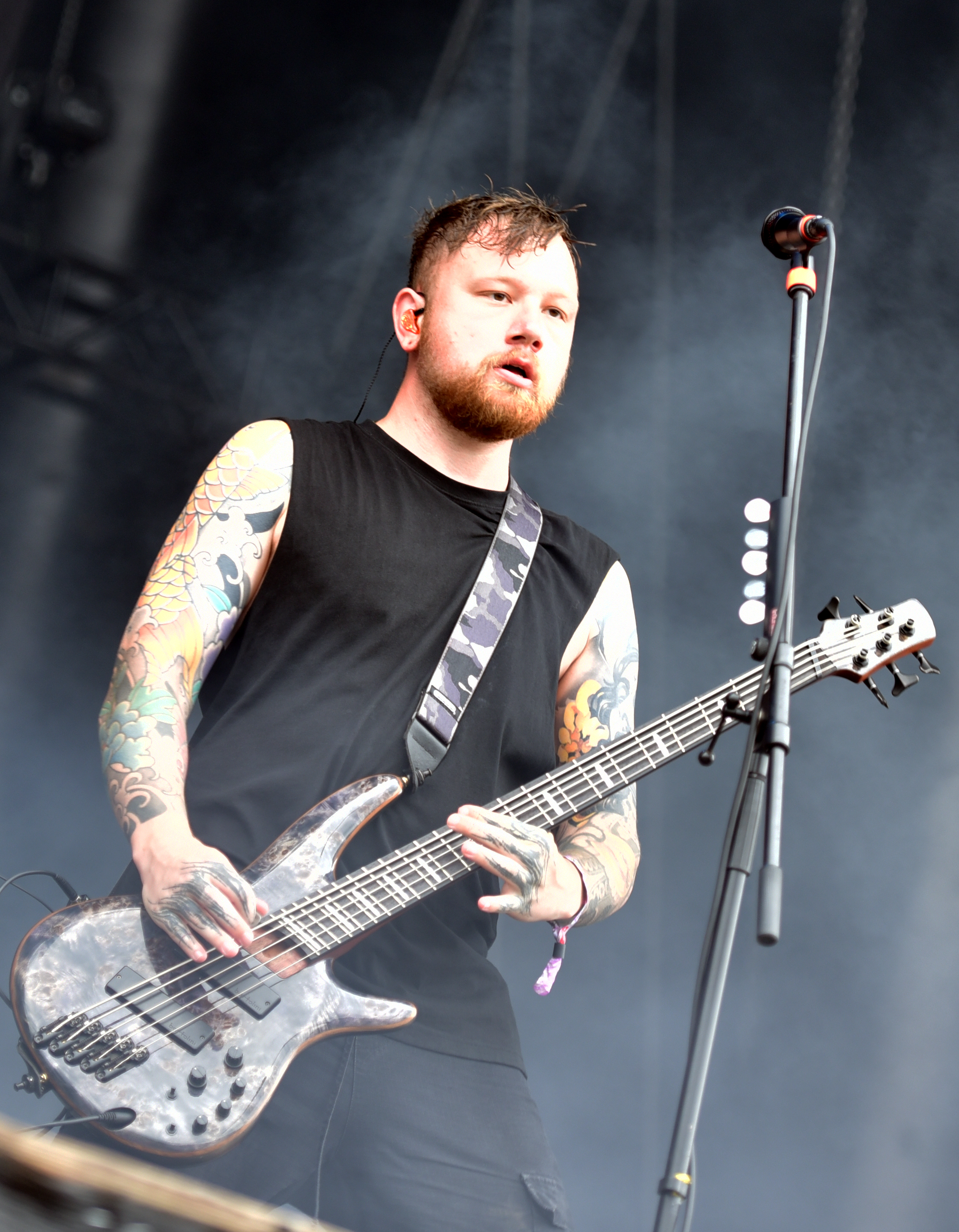
Tommy Lee

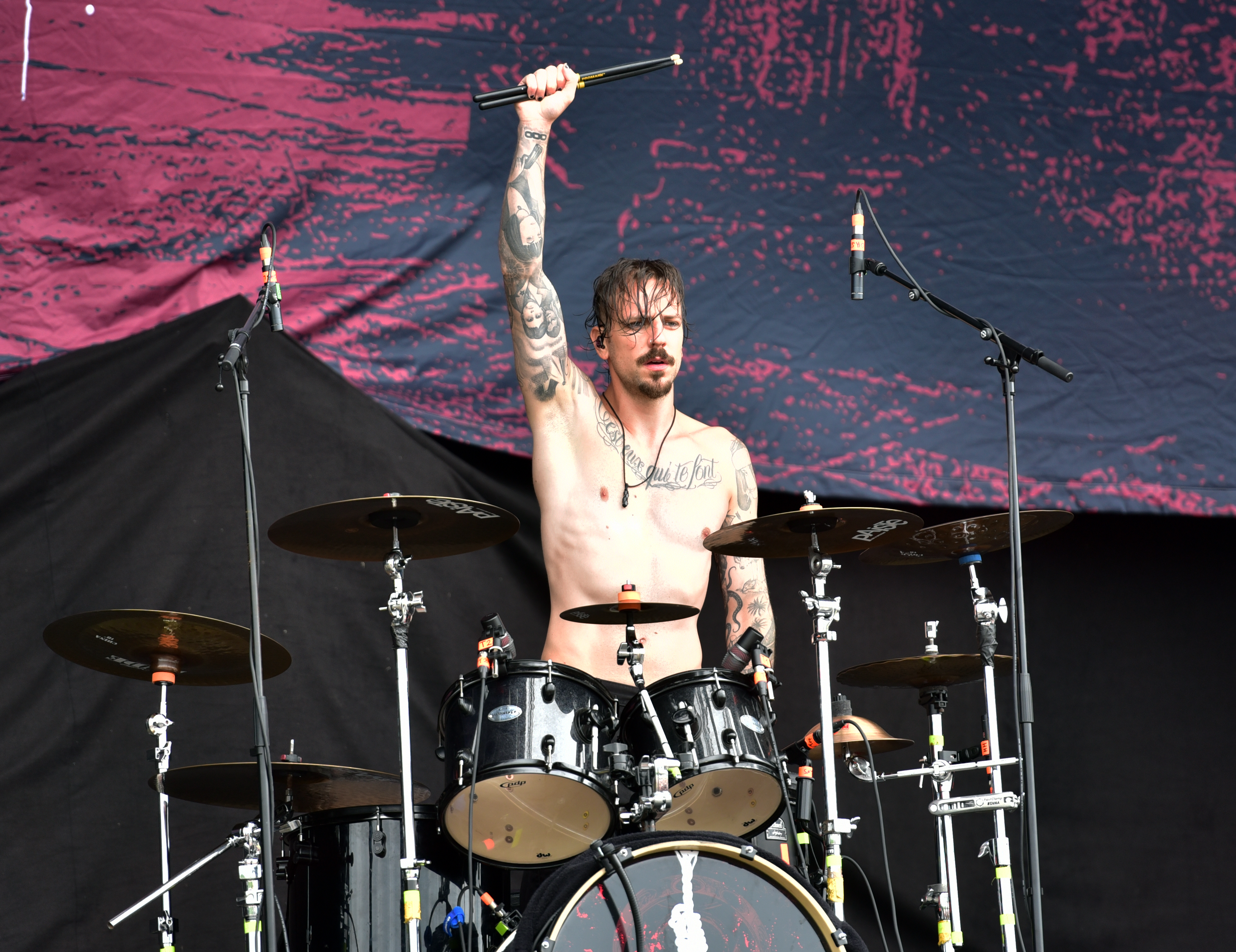
Cassiano "Cassi" Toma

Current

- Marc "Zelli" Zellweger – lead vocals (2017–present)
- Yannick Lehmann – guitar, backing vocals (2017–present)
- Tommy Lee – bass, backing vocals (2017–present)
- Luigi Paraventi – drums (2026–present)

Former

- Colin "CJ" Hammond – drums (2017–2022)
- Cassiano “Cassi” Toma – drums (2023–2026)

== Discography ==
=== Albums ===
- Chapter 3: The Last Selection (2020)
- Fear & Dagger (2022)
- Cursed (2025)

=== EPs ===
- Chapter 1: From the Gallows (2018)
- Chapter 2: Witch King (2019)
- The Wilted EP (2026)

=== Singles ===
- "Deprivation Method, Ch. 2" (with Mental Cruelty, Parjure & xVICIOUSx; 2018)
- "Curse Us" (2020)
- "The Rats" (with Clench Your Fist; 2020)
- "Dead Man's Diary" (with Landmvrks; 2021)
- "Deathtouch" (2021)
- "The Orphan" (2022)
- "Argent Justice" (with Distant, Suicide Silence, Emmure, Abbie Falls, Acranius, AngelMaker, Bodysnatcher, CABAL, Crown Magnetar, Ten56. & Worm Shepherd; 2023)
- "Best Before: Death" (2023)
- "Please End Me" (2023)
- "Older Days" (2023)
- "The Gallow" (2023)
- "Lost in the Dark" (with Left to Suffer; 2024)
- "You Can't Kill Me" (with Fallbrawl; 2024)
- "Dominant Predation" (with Get the Shot; 2024)
- "Secrets of the Shadows" (with Nathan James; 2024)
- "snuff.tape" (with VCTMS; 2024)
- "Site Mentality" (with Pintglass; 2024)
- "Hatred" (2024)
- "My Blood on Your Hands" (2024)
- "Love Burns" (2024)
- "Talk" (with Nasty; 2025)
- "Solara" (with Unprocessed; 2025)
- "Instrument of War" (with Stick to Your Guns; 2025)
- "Let Me Sleep" (2025)
- "Everything Is Fine" (2025)
