= Skal Vi Lege Doktor? =

Studio album by Red Warszawa
- Released: 1998
- Recorded: 1997
- Genre: Punk metal, comedy rock
- Length: 74 minutes
- Label: Gusten Fætter Records
- Producer: Bo Lund, Michael Krogh

Red Warszawa chronology
| Hævi Mætal og Hass (1996) | Skal Vi Lege Doktor? (1998) | Tysk Hudindustri (2000) |

Singles from Skal vi Lege Doktor?
- 1. "Julemandens Selvmordsbrev" Released: 1997

Professional ratings
Review scores
| Source | Rating |
|---|---|
| Gaffa | link |

Skal vi Lege Doktor? (Danish for "Shall we Play Doctor?") is the Danish Heavy metal band Red Warszawa's second studio album. The album is under titled "Greatest Hits 1986–1997 Volume 2".

== Track listing ==
1. "Skal Vi Lege Doktor" (Shall we Play Doctor)
2. "Slå Ihjel" (Kill)
3. "Den Sorte Garderobe" (The Black Wardrobe)
4. "Satanisk Kommunisme" (Satanic Communism)
5. "Fjæsing" (Weever)
6. "MC Nymands Rap"
7. "Sindsyg af Natur" (Insane by Nature)
8. "Børnenes Domstol" (The Children's Court)
9. "Strandvasker" (Beach Washer)
10. "Onnanitta"
11. "Noas Ark"
12. "Ulrikkensborg Plads"
13. "Lumrefismanden" (The Sultryfartman)
14. "Nord for Nordkap" (North of North Cape)
15. "Julemandens Selvmordsbrev" (The Santa Claus' Suicide Letter)
16. "Instant Drunk"

== Cover ==
- The album cover

== Personnel ==
"Lækre" Jens Mondrup – Vocals
"Heavy" Henning Nymand – Guitar
"Tonser" Henrik – Bass
Lars Gerrild – Drums
Bo Lund, Michael Krogh – Producer
