= Kim Dracula =

Australian trap metal music artist

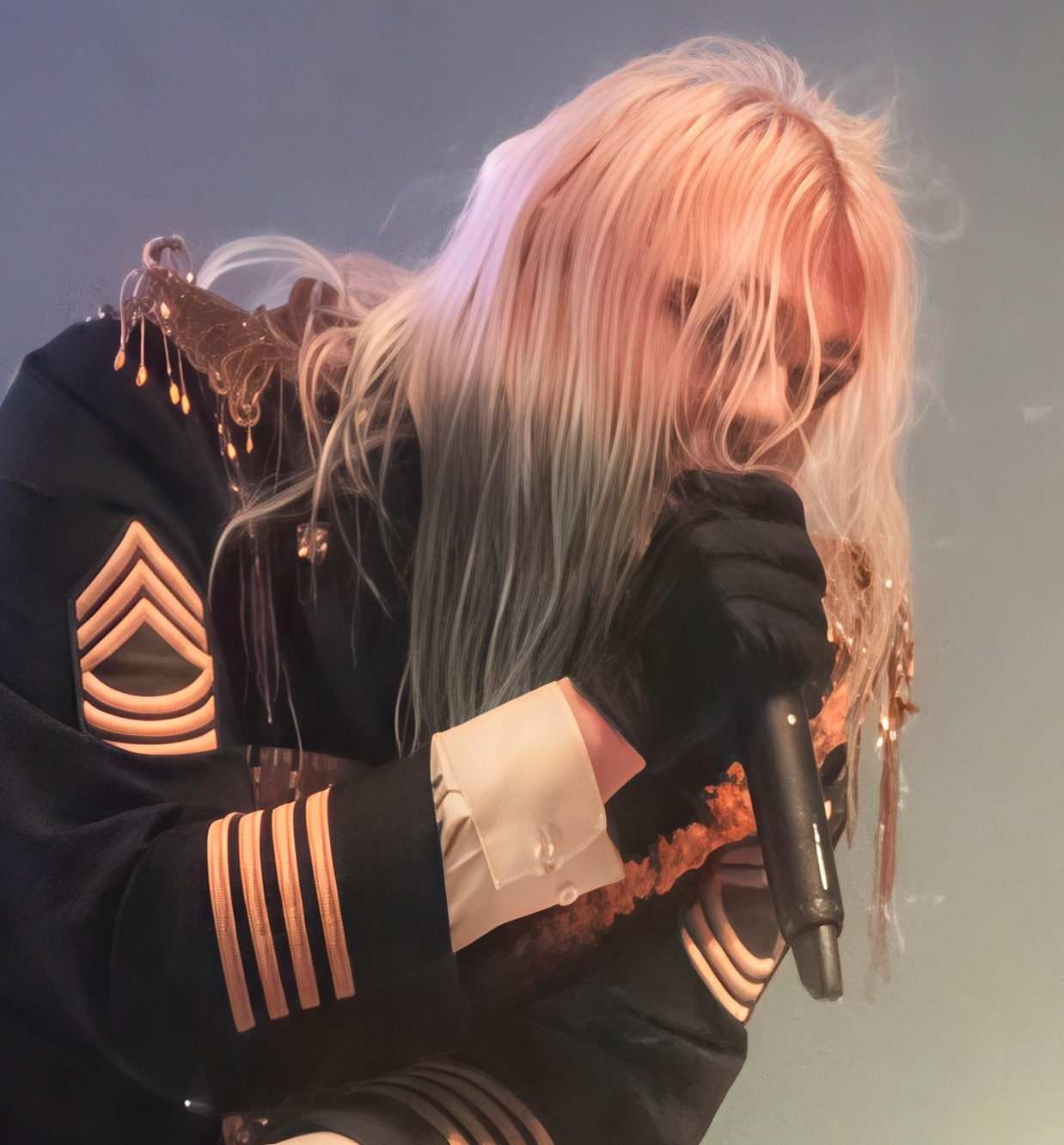
- Dracula performing in 2024

Background information
- Born: Samuel Wellings; November 24, 1997 (age 28)
- Origin: Hobart, Tasmania, Australia
- Occupations: Singer; songwriter; musician; rapper
- Years active: 2020–present
- Labels: Order of the Snake; Rise

Samuel Wellings, known professionally as Kim Dracula, is an Australian singer, songwriter, musician, and rapper from Hobart, Tasmania, whose songs have achieved popularity on TikTok. They are known both for original work and for metal covers of songs not typically associated with the genre. They became popular on YouTube for their authorial song "Make Me Famous" from their album A Gradual Decline In Morale. Dracula was previously the drummer of multiple bands (including The Dead Maggies, a Tasmanian folk-punk group). They were also the vocalist of Australian heavy metal band Jesterpose, which formed in 2017 and released the EP COVID-19 in 2020.

Kim Dracula's name is a reference to the Deftones song "Kimdracula" from their album Saturday Night Wrist.

== Musical career ==
In November 2020, Kim Dracula released on TikTok a hardcore cover of "Paparazzi" by Lady Gaga. The song was subsequently released to Spotify on 11 December 2020. Their "Paparazzi" cover acquired viral popularity within months, with six million views on YouTube, thirteen million plays on Spotify, and use in over 60,000 TikTok clips before the end of the year. The runaway success of the song propelled Kim Dracula to fourth-most followed Australian TikTok music artist of 2020, trailing Sia, Iggy Azalea, and Mia Rodriguez.

In January 2021, "Paparazzi" entered Spotify's Global Viral 50 chart, where it reached as high as number 4 on 13 January. The same month, Kim Dracula opened at number 47 on the Billboard Emerging Artists chart, fueled mostly by the success of "Paparazzi" which entered the Hot Rock & Alternative Songs chart at number 31.

By April 2021, Kim Dracula's "Paparazzi" cover had 13.4 million views on TikTok, 33 million views on YouTube, and 55 million listens on Spotify, while Kim Dracula had ascended to becoming the second most followed Australian TikTok personality, with only Sia having more followers. Kim Dracula's 2022 singles "Make Me Famous" and "Drown" were reviewed favorably by Rock Sound magazine, the latter track being described as "a barrage of sounds and styles...as weird as it is wonderful."

On 14 July 2023, Kim Dracula released their debut album A Gradual Decline in Morale, which contains 20 tracks, including four previously released singles.

Kim Dracula plays the role of Luther on the 2024 concept album by Lin-Manuel Miranda and Eisa Davis, Warriors.

== Personal life ==
Kim Dracula uses they/them pronouns. In a 2023 interview, Kim Dracula revealed that they have obsessive–compulsive disorder (OCD).

== Discography ==
=== Studio albums ===
List of studio albums, with selected details
Title	Album details
A Gradual Decline in Morale	Released: July 14, 2023; Label: Order of the Snake; Format: CD, digital download, streaming

=== Singles ===
==== As lead artist ====
List of singles, with year released and album name shown
Title	Year	Peak chart positions		Album
Title	Year	NZ Hot	US	Album
"Killdozer"	2020	—	—	Non-album singles
"1-800-Close-Ur-Eyes"	2020	—	—	Non-album singles
"Say Please!"	2020	—	—	Non-album singles
"Paparazzi" (Lady Gaga cover)	2020	19	— (Note: "Paparazzi" did not enter the Billboard 100 but did peak at number 47 on the Emerging Artists Chart and at number 31 on the Hot Rock & Alternative Songs Chart.)	Non-album singles
"Make Me Famous"	2022	—	—	A Gradual Decline In Morale
"Drown"	2022	—	—	A Gradual Decline In Morale
"Seventy Thorns" (featuring Jonathan Davis)	2023	—	—	A Gradual Decline In Morale
"Hysterics"	2023	—	—	Non-album singles
"Death Before Designer" (featuring SosMula)	2023	—	—	Non-album singles
"Land of the Sun"	2023	—	—	A Gradual Decline In Morale
"In Threes"	2025	—	—	Non-album singles
"Molecular Conversion"	2026	—	—	Non-album singles

==== As featured artist ====
Title	Year	Album
"The Bard's Last Note" (Ricky Desktop featuring Kim Dracula)	2020	Non-album single
"Vinny Rotten" (SosMula featuring Kim Dracula)	2021	13 Songs 2 Die 2
"Червь / Worm" (IC3PEAK featuring Kim Dracula)	2022	Non-album single
"Artificial Anatomy" (Left to Suffer featuring Kim Dracula)	2023	Feral
"W H A T (We're Hungry And Thirsty)" (Tech N9ne featuring HU$H, Kim Dracula)	2023	W H A T (We're Hungry And Thirsty)
"Lubricant Like Kerosene" (SeeYouSpaceCowboy... featuring Kim Dracula)	2024	Coup De Grâce
"Candy Man" (SosMula featuring Kim Dracula)	2024	Sleez Religion
"Heretic" (In This Moment featuring Kim Dracula)	2025	Witch

== Awards and nominations ==
Award ceremony	Year	Work	Category	Result
Berlin Music Video Awards	2022	MAKE ME FAMOUS	Most Bizarre	Nominated
Berlin Music Video Awards	2023	Drown	Best Director	Nominated
Heavy Music Awards	2024		Best International Breakthrough Artist	Won

== Tours ==
=== Headlining ===
- America's Gradual Decline In Morale Tour (2024)
- Europe + The UK Tour (2025)
- Horror Down Under Tour (2025)

=== Co-headlining ===
- US Tour Spring 2025 (with Hanabie.) (2025)

=== Opening act ===
- Life is But A Dream... North American Tour Pt. 1 and 2 (for Avenged Sevenfold) (2023)
- The Godmode Tour Pt.1 and 2 (for In This Moment) (2024)
- Hell Of A Summer Tour (for Ice Nine Kills and Dayseeker) (2025)
