= EVRA (band) =

EVRA is a Danish hardcore/stoner band from Copenhagen, Denmark, which officially formed in 2013. Their musical style is rooted in hardcore punk with strong stoner rock and mathcore elements. They have garnered critical and fan acclaim for their high energy, intense live shows. EVRA has been touring across Europe in countries including Germany, Belgium, and Estonia.

== EPs ==
EVRA (2013)

== Full-length albums ==
Lightbearer (2015)

== Music videos ==
Erase/Rebuild (2013)
Lightbearer (2015)

== Visuals ==
Washed Away (2015)

== Current members ==
- Frederik Emborg Pedersen – lead vocals (2013–present)
- Emil Gjerulff Bak – lead guitar (2012–present)
- Ole Schwartz – bass (2012–present)
- Nicholas Meents – drums (2012–present)

== Former members ==
- Marc Lennart – Guitar (2012-2014)
