= Huldre (band) =

Danish folk metal band

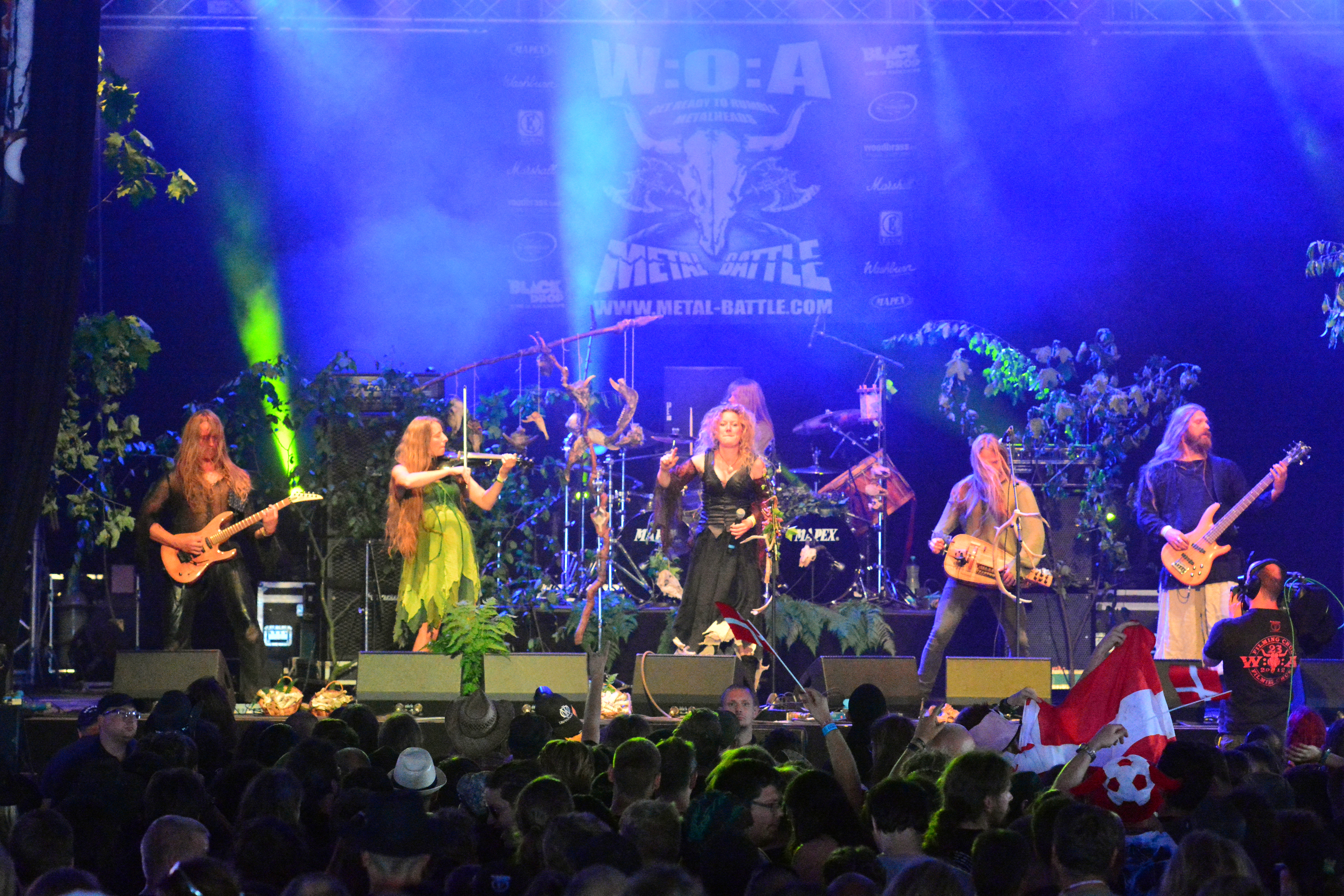
- Huldre at Wacken Open Air 2014

Background information
- Origin: Copenhagen, Denmark
- Genres: Folk metal
- Years active: 2009–2019
- Label: Gateway Music
- Members: Nanna Barslev; Bjarne Kristiansen; Troels Noergaard; Laura Beck; Lasse Olufson; Jacob Lund
- Website: huldre.dk

Huldre was a Danish folk metal band from Copenhagen. It combines traditional Danish and Nordic folk music and folklore with rock and metal. The group has female vocals with violin, hurdy-gurdy, flute, guitar, lute, bass guitar and drums. Huldre was awarded third place in the Wacken Open Air Battle 2014.

In 2019, Huldre announced their decision to part ways, along with their farewell concerts at Wacken Winter Nights, Århus and Copenhagen which took place on 24 February 16 and 29 March, respectively.

== Members ==
- Nanna Barslev – vocals
- Bjarne Kristiansen – bass
- Troels Noergaard – hurdy-gurdy, flute
- Laura Beck – violin
- Lasse Olufson – guitar, lute
- Jacob Lund – drums, percussion

== Discography ==
- 2010: Huldre (demo)
- 2012: Intet Menneskebarn ("No Human Child")
- 2016: Tusmørke
