= Bombus (band) =

Swedish heavy metal band

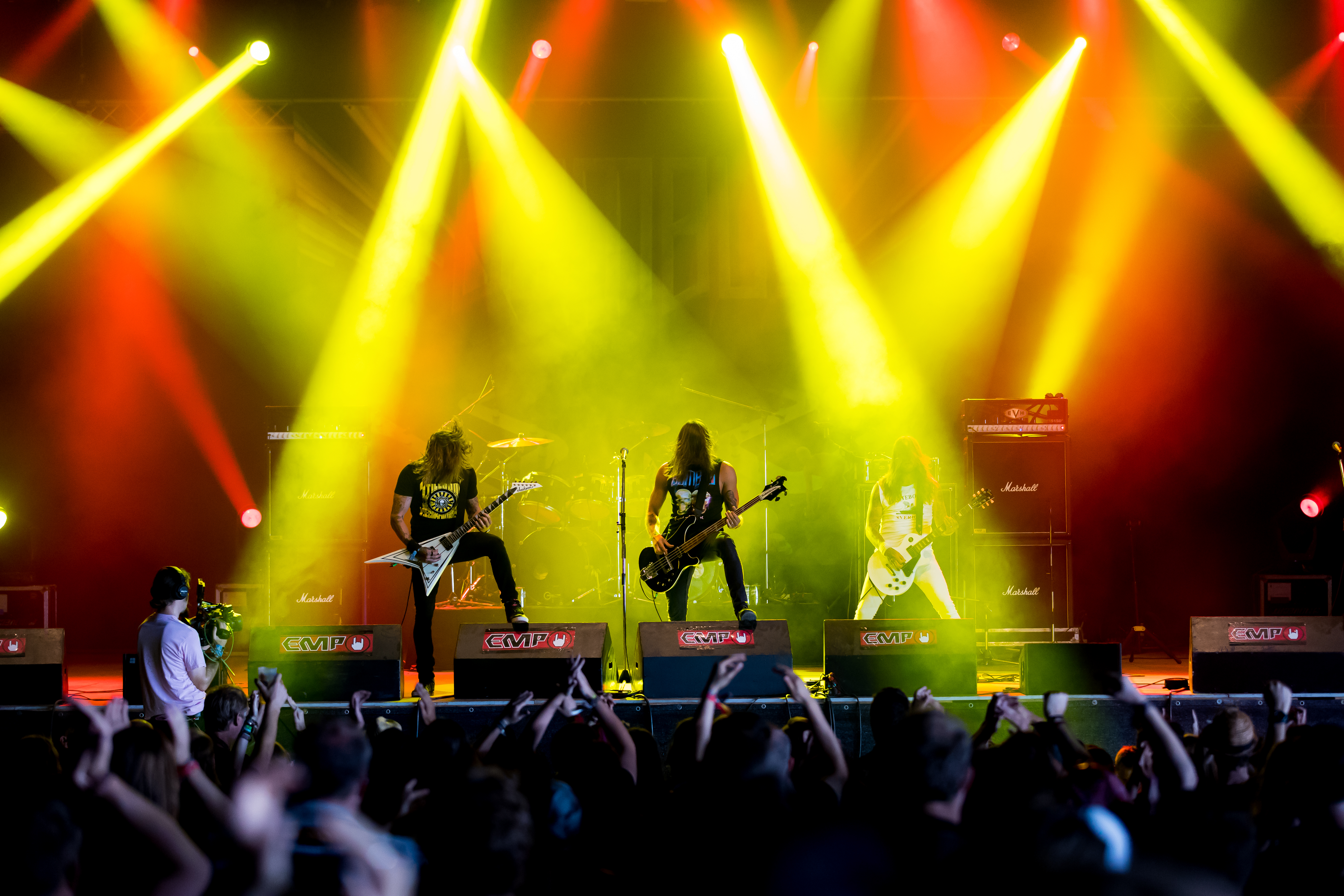
- Bombus playing at Summer Breeze Open Air in 2016.

Background information
- Origin: Gothenburg, Sweden
- Genres: Heavy metal, hard rock
- Years active: 2008–present
- Labels: Mourningwood Recordings, Century Media
- Members: Feffe; Peter Asp; Ola Henriksson; Simon Solomon; Johan Meiton
- Past members: Ulf Lundén; Jonas Rydberg; Matte Säker
- Website: Bombusmusic.com

Bombus are a heavy metal band from Gothenburg, Sweden. Bombus initially signed to Mourningwood Recordings, releasing 3 singles and their debut album Bombus before signing to Century Media on 10 April 2013; releasing another single "Apparatus", on 6 May 2013, and their second studio album The Poet and the Parrot on 26 September 2013.

== Band members ==
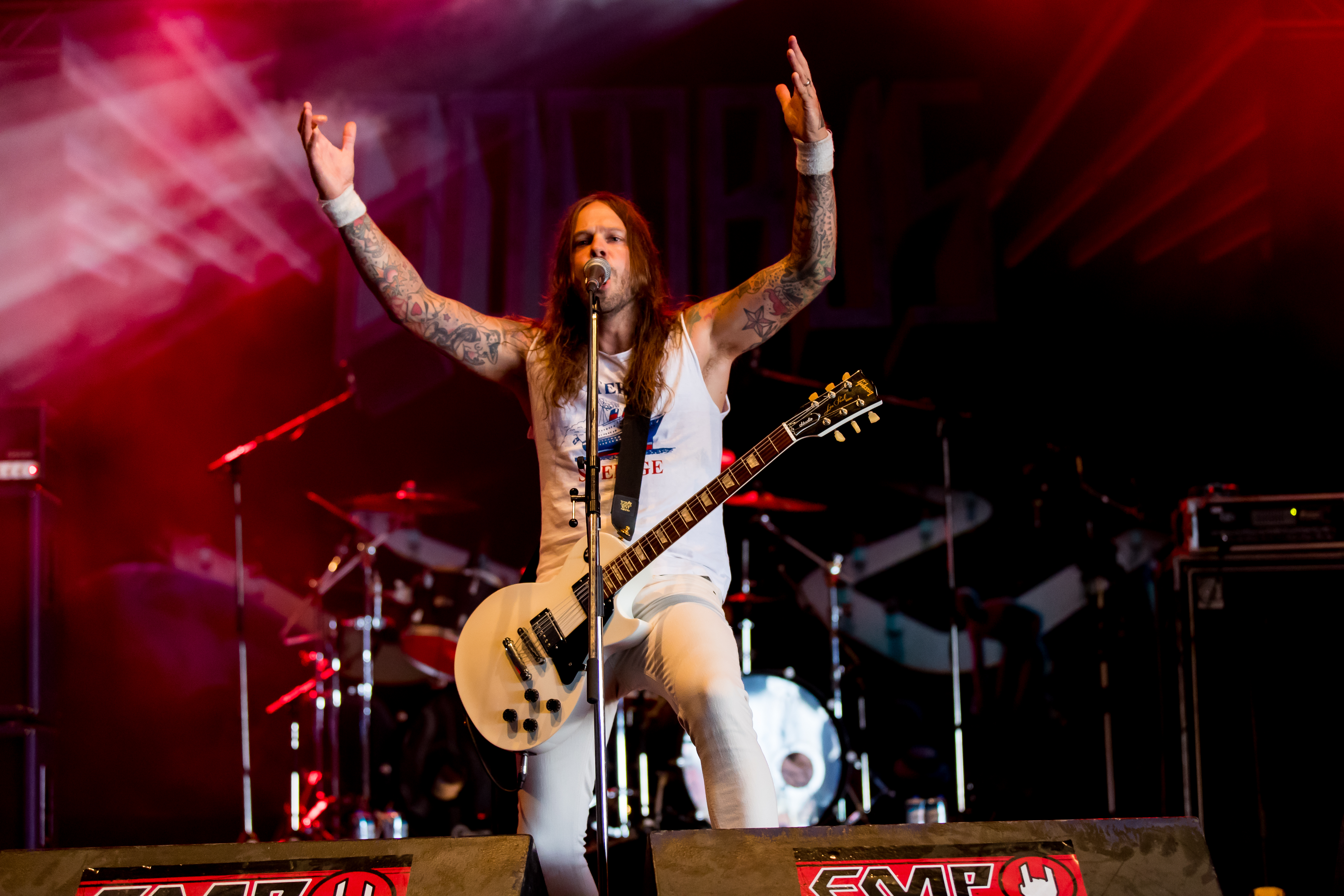
Bombus live at Summer Breeze Open Air in 2016

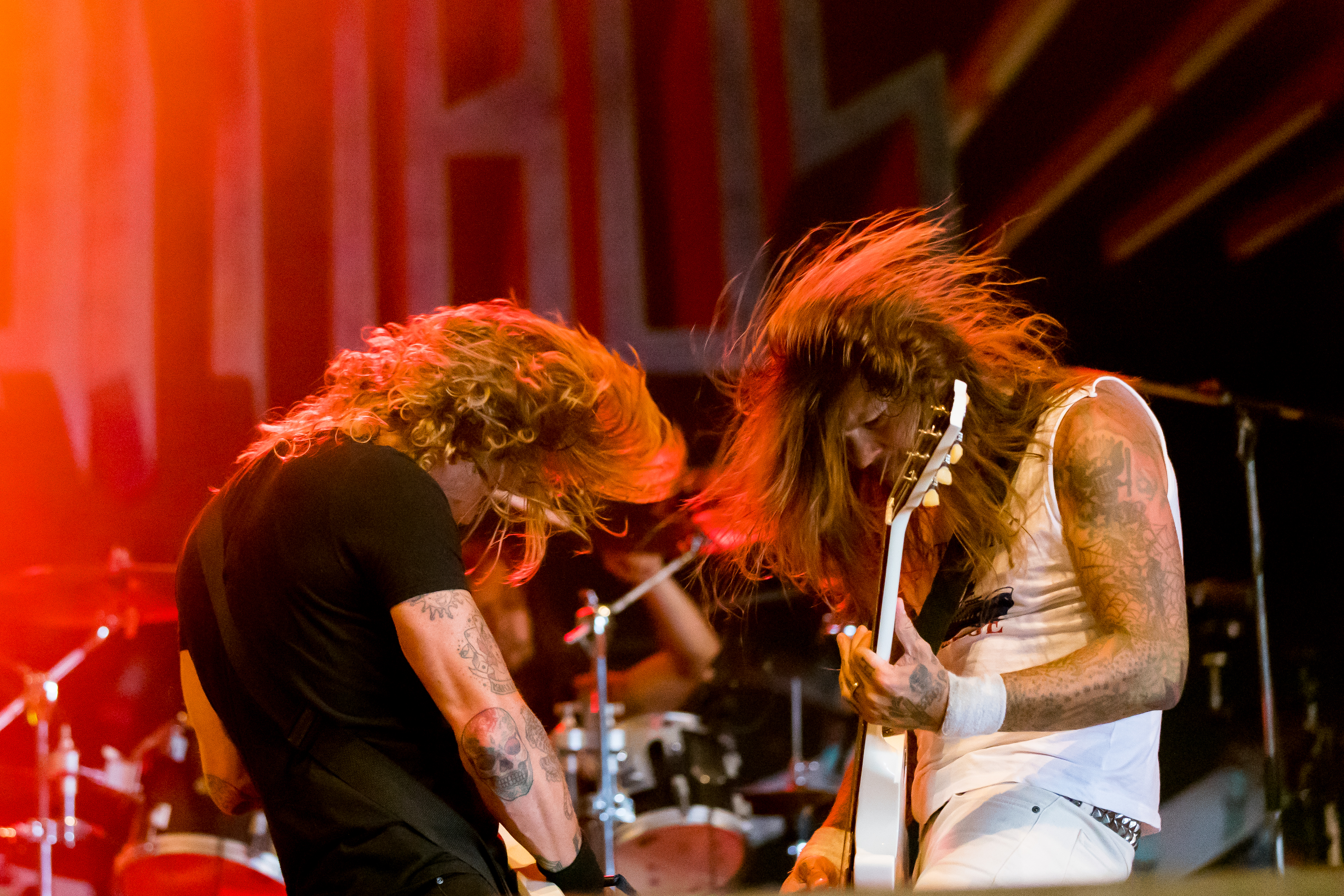
Bombus live at Summer Breeze Open Air in 2016

Current

- Feffe Berglund – Vocals, Guitar (2008–present)
- Peter Asp – Drums (2009–present)
- Ola Henriksson – Bass (2015–present)
- Simon Solomon – Guitar (2018–present)
- Johan Meiton – Guitar (2020–present)

Former

- Ulf Lundén – Bass (2009–2012)
- Jonas Rydberg – Bass (2012–2014)
- Matte Säker – Vocals, Guitar (2008–2020)

== Discography ==
=== Studio albums ===
- Bombus (2010)
- The Poet and the Parrot (2013)
- Repeat Until Death (2016)
- Vulture Culture (2019)
- Your Blood (2024)

=== Singles ===
- "Bring Me the Head of Your Dog" / "Deep River" (2009)
- "The Slaughter" / "Und So Weiter" (2009)
- "A Safe Passage" / "Cult Leader" (2011)
- "Apparatus" / "Biblical" (2013)
