= Red Warszawa =

Danish heavy metal band

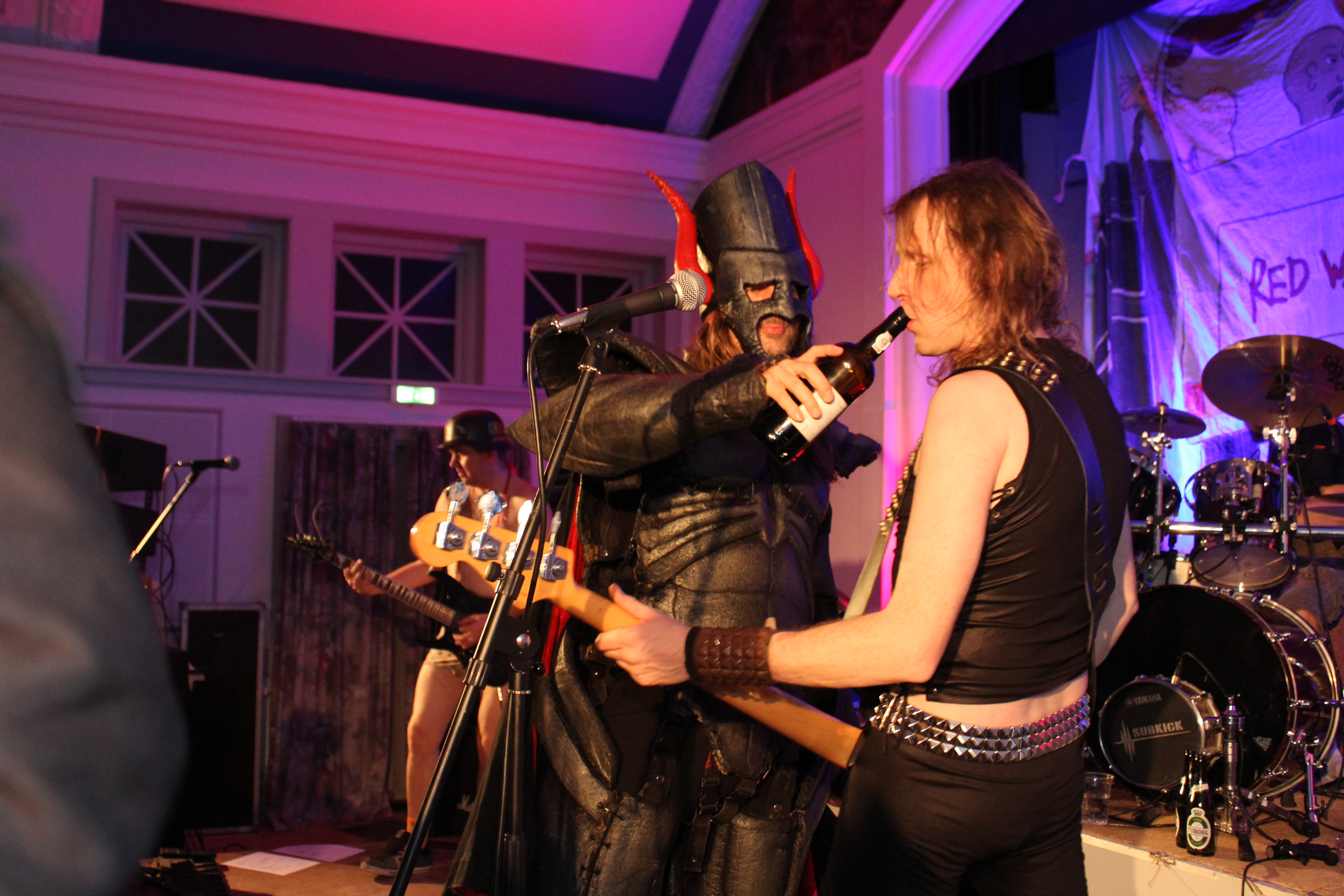

Background information
- Origin: Ballerup, Denmark
- Genres: Heavy metal, Polish punk
- Years active: 1986-present
- Labels: Gusten Fætter Records
- Members: "Lækre" Jens Mondrup "Heavy" Henning Nymand; Morbus Crohn; Matthias "MyTightAss" Pedersen
- Website: www.rw.dk

Red Warszawa is a heavy metal band from Copenhagen, Denmark, formed in 1986 by "Lækre" Jens Mondrup and "Heavy" Henning Nymand.

Red Warszawa's lyrics are in the Danish language and mainly concern taboo themes such as alcoholism, child abuse, prostitution, drug abuse and the like, presented in a blackly humorous and satirical fashion. The band's lyrics and image present the group as low-class, uneducated, crass, alcoholic and proud of it. The main recurring theme of the band's lyrics is low-class Danish social misery and its connected vices such as racism, alcoholism, domestic violence, drug abuse and lacking education.

The band had a cameo in the Danish movie In China They Eat Dogs, as a heavy metal band inadvertently getting executed.

== History ==
In 1986 "Lækre" Jens Mondrup and "Heavy" Henning Nymand's teacher played a song by a Polish punk band. They liked it and decided to play it themselves, so they started the band today known as Red Warszawa. Around 1990 Red Warszawa changed their music style to Heavy Metal, but they still claim that their style is Polish punk because they think it sounds much cooler.

In 2025, after 39 years, Jens decided to leave the band - all on good terms - with their last show together at Amager Dio.

== Band name ==
According to the band's website, the name was supposed to mean "Red Warsaw" - red as in the colour red, and Warsaw as in the capital of Poland. But the band members thought that the city was called Warszawa in English - as it is called in both Danish and Polish - so they named their band "Red Warszawa". Red in Danish means save, and because of that, many Danes thought that Red Warszawa was an organisation like Save the Children (Danish: Red Barnet).

Red Warszawa is pronounced as in English red and Danish Warszawa.

== Members ==
Current members

- "Lækre" Jens Mondrup - Vocals (1986–1991, 1992–1993, 1995–present)
- "Heavy" Henning Nymand - Guitar (1986–present)
- Morbus Crohn - Drums (2013'ish–present)
- Matthias "MyTightAss" Pedersen - Bass (2006–present)

Former members

- Stefan Kjergaard - Guitar (1987-1990)
- "Panik" Troels Christensen - Bass (1987-1989)
- Robert Smidt - Drums (1987-1988)
- Mads Flanding - Horns (1987)
- Michael Nielsen - Drums (1988-1989)
- Jacob Sundmand - Vocals (1989)
- Damien Gregory - Keyboards (1990)
- Martin Thordrup - Bass (1990-1993)
- Anders Schlandbuch - Drums (1990)
- Erik Gert Olsen - Vocals (1994)
- Joachim Bøggild - Bass (1994)
- Lev Averboukh - Drums (1994)
- "Tonser" Henrik Holstrøm - Bass (1995-2002)
- Jan Wiegandt - Drums (1995-1996)
- Lars Gerrild - Drums (1996-1998)
- "Dumme" Daniel Preisler Larsen - Drums (1999-2000)
- Morten "Måtten Møbelbanker" Nielsen - Drums (2000-2013)
- Lars "Majbritt" Mayland - Bass (2002-2003)
- Thomas "Tove Tusindpik" Christensen - Bass (2003-2006)

== Discography ==
- Hævi Mætal og Hass (1996)
- Skal Vi Lege Doktor? (1998)
- Tysk Hudindustri (2000)
- Omvendt Blå Kors (2002)
- Return of the Glidefedt (2004)
- De 4 Årstider I Nordvest (2010)
- Lade (2020)
