= Cabal (band) =

Danish metal band

- Origin: Copenhagen, Denmark
- Genre: Deathcore
- Years active: 2015–present
- Label: Nuclear Blast
- Members: Andreas Bjulver; Chris Kreutzfeldt; Dennis Hursid; Mikkel Hvam
- Past members: Nikolaj Kaae Kirk; Malthe Sørensen; Lui Broch Larsen; Christian Hammer

CABAL are a Danish deathcore band founded in 2015.

They released their debut album Mark of Rot in 2018, followed by Drag Me Down in 2020, both via Long Branch Records. The following year, the band signed to Nuclear Blast, releasing Magno Interitus in 2022. In March 2025, they put out their fourth album Everything Rots.

== Members ==
=== Current ===
- Andreas Bjulver – vocals
- Chris Kreutzfeldt – guitars (studio only)
- Dennis Hursid – guitars, bass
- Mikkel Hvam – drums

=== Past ===
- Nikolaj Kaae Kirk – drums (2015–2024)
- Malthe Sørensen – bass
- Lui Broch Larsen – guitars
- Christian Hammer – guitars
- Arsalan Sakhi – guitars
- Tyler Saxz – drums

== Discography ==
=== Albums ===
- Mark of Rot (2018)
- Drag Me Down (2020)
- Magno Interitus (2022)
- Everything Rots (2025)

=== EPs ===
- Purge (2016)
- Exit Wound (2022)
- Reworks (2024)
