= 2023 in heavy metal music =

This is a timeline documenting the events of heavy metal in the year 2023.

== Bands disbanded ==
- The Agonist
- Betraying the Martyrs
- Cross Vein
- Dark Fortress
- Dawn Ray'd
- Kiss
- Kix
- Palisades
- Power Quest
- Russkaja
- Terrorizer

== Bands formed ==
- Better Lovers
- Category 7
- Whom Gods Destroy
- Bloodstain

== Bands reformed ==
- 3 Inches of Blood
- Agalloch
- Blessthefall
- Creed
- Crimson Glory
- The Dillinger Escape Plan
- Extol
- Forbidden
- For My Pain...
- Haste the Day
- Lord Kaos
- Martyr
- Newsted
- A Plea for Purging
- Poisonblack
- Savatage
- Tarot
- Terrorizer
- Thousand Foot Krutch
- Training for Utopia
- Wrathchild

== Events ==
- On January 26, Twisted Sister reunited for a one-off performance following their induction into the Metal Hall of Fame. It was the band's first live performance since disbanding in 2016.
- On February 3, Furnace Fest 2023 has been announced to take place on September 23 and 24 at the Sloss Furnaces in Birmingham, Alabama. Among many bands announced to perform, several of them are reuniting for the festival after having previously split up, including Haste the Day, A Plea for Purging, and Training for Utopia. On February 22, it was announced that Symphony in Peril, who reformed last year, will play at the festival's preshow, their first show in 18 years.
- On February 27, Marty Friedman performed three songs with Megadeth at the Budokan in Japan. This marked his first performance with the band in 23 years.
- In February, after years of speculation and rumors since being unveiled as the "unidentified vocalist named "Xer0" of Static-X in 2019, Edsel Dope officially confirmed in an interview that he indeed was Xer0.
- On March 31, an EF1 tornado caused the roof of the Apollo Theater in Belvediere, Illinois, United States, to collapse while the venue was hosting Morbid Angel, Crypta, Revocation, and Skeletal Remains, resulting in one casualty and injuring 28 others.
- On May 7, Vulvodynia fired founding vocalist Duncan Bentley after he allegedly tried to kill their drummer Thomas Hughes.
- On June 7, Slipknot announced the departure of longtime sampler and keyboardist Craig Jones.
- On October 25, Dream Theater announced the departure of drummer Mike Mangini and the return of the band's original drummer, Mike Portnoy, after a 13-year absence.
- On November 5, Slipknot announced the band was parting ways with drummer Jay Weinberg. Weinberg joined the band in 2014, replacing founding member Joey Jordison.
- On November 28, guitarist Kiko Loureiro announced his departure from Megadeth.
- On December 1 and 2, Kiss concluded their End of the Road World Tour with a set of back-to-back final shows in their hometown of New York City at Madison Square Garden.
- On December 30, Arch Enemy announced the departure of longtime guitarist Jeff Loomis. Subsequently, Joey Concepcion was announced as his replacement.

== Deaths ==
- January 1 – Sebastian Marino, former guitarist of Overkill and Anvil, died from a heart attack at the age of 57.
- January 9 – Justin Bartlett, artist who created album cover art for Sunn O))), Trap Them, Cadaver, and Hooded Menace, died from stage 4 colorectal cancer at the age of 45.
- January 18 – TJ de Blois, former drummer of A Life Once Lost, died from undisclosed reasons.
- January 27 – Zbigniew "Vika" Wróblewski, former guitarist of Vader, died from undisclosed reasons at the age of 60.
- February 14 – Tim Aymar, vocalist of Pharaoh and former vocalist of Control Denied, died from undisclosed reasons at the age of 59.
- February 16 – Michael "Majk Moti" Kupper, former guitarist of Running Wild, died from undisclosed reasons at the age of 65.
- March 8 – Jim Durkin, guitarist of Dark Angel, died from undisclosed reasons at the age of 58.
- March 8 – Josua Madsen, drummer of Artillery, died after being hit by a bus at the age of 45.
- March 22 – Wayne Swinny, guitarist of Saliva, died from a brain hemorrhage at the age of 59.
- April 7 – John Regan, former bassist of Frehley's Comet, died from undisclosed reasons at the age of 71.
- April 23 – John Rae, former drummer of Wykked Wytch, died from alcoholism at the age of 51.
- May 1 – Jordan Blake, vocalist of A Skylit Drive, died from undisclosed reasons.
- May 17 – Algy Ward, vocalist of Tank, died from undisclosed reasons at the age of 63.
- May 22 – Kirk Arrington, former drummer of Metal Church, died from an unspecified illness at the age of 61.
- May 23 – Mark Adams, former bassist of Saint Vitus, died from Parkinson's disease at the age of 64.
- May 27 – Toshihiro Niimi, drummer of Bow Wow, died from cancer at the age of 66.
- June 19 – Ryan Siew, guitarist of Polaris, died from undisclosed reasons at the age of 26.
- June 23 – Lee Rauch, former drummer of Megadeth and Dark Angel, died from undisclosed reasons at the age of 58.
- June 25 – Erik Ferro, drummer of T.T. Quick, died from undisclosed reasons.
- July 14 – Anthony Meo, former drummer of Biohazard, died from cancer.
- July 26 – James Harvey IV, former bassist of Goatwhore, died from undisclosed reasons at the age of 35.
- August 5 – Cláudio Lopes, bassist of Dorsal Atlântica, died from a heart attack at the age of 59.
- August 9 – Brad Thomson, former guitarist of The Tony Danza Tapdance Extravaganza, died from undisclosed reasons.
- August 24 – Bernie Marsden, former guitarist of Whitesnake, died from undisclosed reasons at the age of 72.
- August 24 – Sakevi Yokoyama, vocalist of G.I.S.M., died from undisclosed reasons.
- September 15 – Axel Blaha, drummer of Paradox, died from undisclosed reasons at the age of 59.
- September 26 – Jon Kennedy, former bassist of Cradle of Filth and former vocalist of Hecate Enthroned, died from injuries sustained in a car crash at the age of 46.
- October 24 – Steve Riley, drummer of Riley's L.A. Guns and former drummer of L.A. Guns, W.A.S.P., and Keel, died from pneumonia at the age of 67.
- October 29 – Hiroshi "Heath" Morie, bassist of X Japan, died from colon cancer at the age of 55.
- November 13 – Dave Corsile, former bassist of Thrown into Exile and former guitarist of downset., died from a heart attack.
- November 17 – Charlie Dominici, former vocalist of Dream Theater, died from undisclosed reasons at the age of 72.
- November 29 – Quint Meerbeek, former drummer of Bodyfarm, died from an unspecified illness at the age of 41.
- December 4 – Andreas Herz, former bassist of Kreator, died from undisclosed reasons.
- December 10 – Cayle Sain, drummer of Twitching Tongues and Ghostemane, died from undisclosed reasons at the age of 31.
- December 26 – Jarbas "Jabá" Alves, former bassist of Ratos de Porão, died from undisclosed reasons at the age of 60.
- December 27 – Michael Gibbons, former guitarist of Leeway, died from undisclosed reasons.

== Albums released ==
=== January ===
Day	Artist	Album
13	Ahab	The Coral Tombs
13	Beyond the Black	Beyond the Black
13	Eisregen	Grenzgänger
13	Obituary	Dying of Everything
13	Turmion Kätilöt	Omen X
13	VV	Neon Noir
20	Atrocity	Okkult III
20	Dark Princess	Phoenix
20	Imperium Dekadenz	Into Sorrow Evermore
20	Katatonia	Sky Void of Stars
20	Riverside	ID.Entity
20	Sabaton	Heroes of the Great War (EP)
20	Twilight Force	At the Heart of Wintervale
27	...And Oceans	As in Gardens, So in Tombs
27	Ablaze My Sorrow	The Loss of All Hope (EP)
27	Ronnie Romero	Raised on Heavy Radio (covers album)
27	Steve Vai	Vai/Gash
27	Uriah Heep	Chaos & Colour

=== February ===
Day	Artist	Album
3	All Out War	Celestial Rot
3	Korn	Requiem Mass (EP)
3	Memoriam	Rise to Power
3	Russkaja	Turbo Polka Party
3	Victor Smolski	Guitar Force
3	Xandria	The Wonders Still Awaiting
10	Aphyxion	Ad Astra
10	Delain	Dark Waters
10	Dream Theater	Distance Over Time Demos (2018) (compilation album)
10	In Flames	Foregone
10	Narrow Head	Moments of Clarity
10	Pierce the Veil	The Jaws of Life
10	Wig Wam	Out of the Dark
17	Avatar	Dance Devil Dance
17	Bridear	Aegis of London... Live! (live album)
17	Clint Lowery	Ghostwriter (EP)
17	Code Orange	What Is Really Underneath? (remix album)
17	Hellripper	Warlocks Grim & Withered Hags
17	Jason Bieler	Postcards from the Asylum
17	Man Must Die	The Pain Behind It All
17	Oceanhoarse	Heads Will Roll
17	Pigs Pigs Pigs Pigs Pigs Pigs Pigs	Land of Sleeper
17	Robin McAuley	Alive
17	See You Next Tuesday	Distractions
17	Skinflint	Hate Spell
22	Lovebites	Judgement Day
24	Azaghal	Alttarimme on Luista Tehty
24	Dope	Blood Money, Part Zer0
24	Godsmack	Lighting Up the Sky
24	Hammerhedd	Nonetheless
24	Hed PE	70's Hits from the Pit (covers album)
24	Heidevolk	Werdekeer
24	Hypno5e	Sheol
24	Insomnium	Anno 1696
24	Kauan	ATM Revised
24	Märvel	Double Decade (compilation album)
24	Necrovation	Storm the Void/Starving Grave (EP)
24	Steel Panther	On the Prowl
24	Venomous Concept	The Good Ship Lollipop

=== March ===
Day	Artist	Album
1	Galneryus	Between Dread and Valor
1	Lynch	Reborn
2	Echoes Of Bronze	Ilium
3	Earth Groans	Tongue Tied (EP)
3	Enslaved	Heimdal
3	Entheos	Time Will Take Us All
3	Full of Hell & Primitive Man	Suffocating Hallucination
3	Fury of Five	Half Past Revenge (EP)
3	Haken	Fauna
3	Sandrider	Enveletration
3	Sortilège	Apocalypso
9	Wes Borland	Mutiny on the Starbarge
10	For the Fallen Dreams	For the Fallen Dreams
10	Frozen Crown	Call of the North
10	Gorod	The Orb
10	Ice Age	Waves of Loss and Power
10	Isole	Anesidora
10	Judiciary	Flesh + Blood
10	Minenwerfer	Feuerwalze
10	Nanowar of Steel	Dislike to False Metal
10	Otherwise	Gawdzillionaire
10	Periphery	Periphery V: Djent Is Not a Genre
10	Sacrificium	Oblivion
10	Story of the Year	Tear Me to Pieces
10	Suicide Silence	Remember... You Must Die
10	Tulus	Fandens Kall
17	Aftermath	No Time to Waste
17	Babylon A.D.	Live Lightning (live album)
17	Chelsea Grin	Suffer in Heaven
17	Contrarian	Sage of Shekhinah
17	Dark Sanctuary	Cernunnos
17	Downfall of Gaia	Silhouettes of Disgust
17	Elysion	Bring Out Your Dead
17	Gideon	More Power. More Pain.
17	Invent Animate	Heavener
17	John Diva and the Rockets of Love	The Big Easy
17	Kamelot	The Awakening
17	Mystic Circle	Erzdämon
17	Narnia	Ghost Town
17	Night Demon	Outsider
17	Pop Evil	Skeletons
17	Redemption	I Am the Storm
17	Seven Spires	Live at ProgPower USA XXI (live album)
17	Theory of a Deadman	Dinosaur
24	Acid King	Beyond Vision
24	August Burns Red	Death Below
24	Babymetal	The Other One
24	Cruachan	The Living and the Dead
24	Dawn Ray'd	To Know the Light
24	Excalion	Once Upon a Time
24	Floor Jansen	Paragon
24	Hatesphere	Hatred Reborn
24	Ihsahn	Fascination Street Sessions (EP)
24	Keep of Kalessin	Katharsis
24	Liturgy	93696
24	Ne Obliviscaris	Exul
24	Ov Sulfur	The Burden Ov Faith
24	Project 86	Omni, Part 1
24	Saxon	More Inspirations (covers album)
24	Subway to Sally	Himmelfahrt
24	Xysma	No Place Like Alone
29	After the Burial	Embrace the Infinity (EP)
31	Ad Infinitum	Chapter III – Downfall
31	Alpha Wolf	Shh (EP)
31	Attack Attack!	Dark Waves (EP)
31	Bury Tomorrow	The Seventh Sun
31	De La Tierra	III
31	Last in Line	Jericho
31	Lordi	Screem Writers Guild
31	The Ongoing Concept	Again
31	Rotten Sound	Apocalypse
31	Visions of Atlantis	Pirates Over Wacken (live album)

=== April ===
Day	Artist	Album
7	Angel Vivaldi	Away with Words, Pt. 2 (EP)
7	Cultura Tres	Camino de Brujos
7	Kiss	Off the Soundboard: Poughkeepsie, New York, 1984 (live album)
7	Paul Gilbert	The Dio Album (covers album)
7	Powerwolf	Interludium
7	Rise of the Northstar	Showdown
7	Tribulation	Hamartia (EP)
14	Atreyu	The Hope of a Spark (EP)
14	Dødheimsgard	Black Medium Current
14	Holy Moses	Invisible Queen
14	Infected Rain	The Devil's Dozen (live album)
14	Jesus Piece	...So Unknown
14	L.A. Guns	Black Diamonds
14	Magnus Karlsson's Free Fall	Hunt the Flame
14	Metallica	72 Seasons
14	Mike Tramp	Songs of White Lion (covers album)
14	Overkill	Scorched
20	Portrayal of Guilt	Devil Music
21	The 69 Eyes	Death of Darkness
21	Angus McSix	Angus McSix and the Sword of Power
21	Anthem	Crimson & Jet Black
21	As Everything Unfolds	Ultraviolet
21	Axel Rudi Pell	The Ballads VI (compilation album)
21	Bell Witch	Future's Shadow Part 1: The Clandestine Gate
21	Dorthia Cottrell	Death Folk Country
21	Enter Shikari	A Kiss for the Whole World
21	Liv Kristine	River of Diamonds
21	Magnus Rosén Band	It's Time to Rock the World Again
21	Texas Hippie Coalition	The Name Lives On
28	Cradle of Filth	Trouble and Their Double Lives (live album)
28	Crown the Empire	Dogma
28	Disciple	Skeleton Psalms
28	Elvenking	Reader of the Runes – Rapture
28	Graveworm	Killing Innocence
28	Iced Earth	Hellrider/I Walk Among You (EP)
28	IGNEA	Dreams of Lands Unseen
28	Majesty	Back to Attack
28	Necronomicon	Constant to Death
28	Runemagick	Beyond the Cenotaph of Mankind
28	Smoulder	Violent Creed of Vengeance

=== May ===
Day	Artist	Album
5	Blood Ceremony	The Old Ways Remain
5	Burning Witches	The Dark Tower
5	Currents	The Death We Seek
5	Dave Lombardo	Rites of Percussion
5	Deathstars	Everything Destroys You
5	Enforcer	Nostalgia
5	Haunt	Golden Arm
5	Krallice	Porous Resonance Abyss
5	Lumsk	Fremmede Toner
5	Savage Grace	Sign of the Cross
5	Scarlet Aura	Rock in Sange si Vointa
5	Therapy?	Hard Cold Fire
5	Tygers of Pan Tang	Bloodlines
5	Unearth	The Wretched; the Ruinous
5	Vintersea	Woven into Ashes
5	Winger	Seven
12	The Acacia Strain	Step into the Light / Failure Will Follow
12	The Amity Affliction	Not Without My Ghosts
12	Cattle Decapitation	Terrasite
12	DevilDriver	Dealing with Demons Vol. II
12	Heavens Edge	Get It Right
12	Veil of Maya	Mother
17	Coldrain	15x(5+U) Live at Yokohama Arena
19	Alcatrazz	Take No Prisoners
19	Arjen Lucassen's Supersonic Revolution	Golden Age of Music
19	Botanist	VIII: Selenotrope
19	Def Leppard with the Royal Philharmonic Orchestra	Drastic Symphonies
19	Ghost	Phantomime (EP)
19	Heretoir	Wastelands (EP)
19	Mystic Prophecy	Hellriot
19	The Ocean	Holocene
19	Sleep Token	Take Me Back to Eden
19	Sweet & Lynch	Heart & Sacrifice
19	Thulcandra	Hail the Abyss
19	Yakuza	Sutra
26	Elegant Weapons	Horns for a Halo
26	Godsticks	This Is What a Winner Looks Like
26	Immortal	War Against All
26	Kalmah	Kalmah
26	Legion of the Damned	The Poison Chalice
26	Magnus Rosén Band	Outside the Rock Box (mini-album)
26	Metal Church	Congregation of Annihilation
26	Sirenia	1977
26	Tesla	Full Throttle Live (live album)
26	Trespass	Wolf at the Door
26	Vomitory	All Heads Are Gonna Roll

=== June ===
Day	Artist	Album
2	Anubis Gate	Interference
2	Avenged Sevenfold	Life Is But a Dream...
2	Bongzilla	Dab City
2	Buckcherry	Vol. 10
2	Gloryhammer	Return to the Kingdom of Fife
2	Omnium Gatherum	Slasher (EP)
2	Wytch Hazel	IV
9	Extreme	Six
9	Glass Casket	Glass Casket (EP)
9	Godflesh	Purge
9	Ray Alder	II
9	Rise to Fall	The Fifth Dimension
9	Scar Symmetry	The Singularity (Phase II – Xenotaph)
9	Shakra	Invincible
9	Slipknot	Adderall (EP)
16	Arkona	Kob'
16	Church of Misery	Born Under a Mad Sign
16	Fifth Angel	When Angels Kill
16	Finger Eleven	Greatest Hits (compilation album)
16	Joel Hoekstra's 13	Crash of Life
16	King Gizzard & the Lizard Wizard	PetroDragonic Apocalypse; or, Dawn of Eternal Night: An Annihilation of Planet Earth and the Beginning of Merciless Damnation
16	Queens of the Stone Age	In Times New Roman...
16	Saturnus	The Storm Within
16	Thy Catafalque	Alföld
23	Jag Panzer	The Hallowed
23	Mental Cruelty	Zwielicht
23	Nocturnal Breed	Carry the Beast
23	Pyramaze	Bloodlines
23	Tsjuder	Helvegr
23	Xasthur	Inevitably Dark
30	Before the Dawn	Stormbringers
30	Death Ray Vision	No Mercy from Electric Eyes
30	Divide and Dissolve	Systemic
30	Raven	All Hell's Breaking Loose
30	Slaughter to Prevail	Live in Moscow (live album)
30	Virgin Steele	The Passion of Dionysus

=== July ===
Day	Artist	Album
7	1476	In Exile
7	Bangalore Choir	Center Mass
7	Better Lovers	God Made Me an Animal (EP)
7	Blackbraid	Blackbraid II
7	Blaze Bayley	Damaged Strange Different and Live (live album)
7	Bloodbound	Tales from the North
7	Butcher Babies	Eye for an Eye... / ...'Til the World's Blind
7	Fen	Monuments to Absence
7	Nita Strauss	The Call of the Void
7	Snuffed on Sight	Smoke
7	The Raven Age	Blood Omen
7	Will Haven	VII
14	Edge of Paradise	Hologram
14	Eleine	We Shall Remain
14	Evile	The Unknown
14	Fallstar	Sacred Mirrors
14	Freedom Call	The M.E.T.A.L. Fest (live album)
14	Kim Dracula	A Gradual Decline in Morale
14	Vendetta	Black as Coal
14	Voyager	Fearless in Love
16	Omega Anima	Cosmos (single)
21	Akercocke	Decades of Devil Worship (live album)
21	Cadaver	The Age of the Offended
21	Soil	Restoration (compilation album)
21	Voivod	Morgöth Tales
21	The Zenith Passage	Datalysium
26	Hanabie.	Reborn Superstar!
28	Contrarian	Demos & Oddities: 1995–1999 (compilation album)
28	From Ashes to New	Blackout
28	Girlschool	WTFortyfive?
28	Mutoid Man	Mutants
28	Panzerchrist	Last of a Kind
28	Sevendust	Truth Killer
28	Signs of the Swarm	Amongst the Low & Empty
28	Uncle Acid & the Deadbeats	Slaughter on First Avenue (live album)

=== August ===
Day	Artist	Album
4	Crypta	Shades of Sorrow
4	Humanity's Last Breath	Ashen
4	Skindred	Smile
11	George Lynch & Jeff Pilson	Heavy Hitters II (covers album)
11	Kataklysm	Goliath
11	King Kobra	We Are Warriors
11	Megaherz	In Teufels Namen
11	Tarja	Rocking Heels: Live at Metal Church (live album)
18	Atreyu	The Moment You Find Your Flame (EP)
18	Cyhra	The Vertigo Trigger
18	Horrendous	Ontological Mysterium
18	Nocte Obducta	Karwoche (Die Sonne Der Toten Pulsiert)
18	Orbit Culture	Descent
18	Ringworm	Seeing Through Fire
18	Skálmöld	Ýdalir
18	Slipknot	Live at MSG (live album)
18	Spirit Adrift	Ghost at the Gallows
18	Urfaust	Untergang
18	Warmen	Here for None
18	Worm Shepherd	The Sleeping Sun (EP)
22	Dethklok	Dethalbum IV
25	Alice Cooper	Road
25	The Armed	Perfect Saviors
25	Asking Alexandria	Where Do We Go from Here?
25	Blut Aus Nord	Disharmonium – Nahab
25	Dethklok	Metalocalypse: Army of the Doomstar (soundtrack album)
25	Endstille	Detonation
25	Exmortus	Necrophony
25	Filter	The Algorithm
25	H.N.A.V.	Memorias Del Abismo (single)
25	Hurricane	Reconnected
25	Incantation	Unholy Deification
25	Lions at the Gate	The Excuses We Cannot Make
25	U.D.O.	Touchdown
25	The Word Alive	Hard Reset
28	Exhumed	Beyond the Dead (EP)

=== September ===
Day	Artist	Album
1	Escape the Fate	Out of the Shadows
1	Marduk	Memento Mori
1	Phil Campbell and the Bastard Sons	Kings of the Asylum
1	Polaris	Fatalism
1	Primal Fear	Code Red
1	Soen	Memorial
1	Stitched Up Heart	To the Wolves
1	Taake	Et hav av avstand
8	Bio-Cancer	Revengeance
8	Conquer Divide	Slow Burn
8	Cryptopsy	As Gomorrah Burns
8	Dying Fetus	Make Them Beg for Death
8	Finsterforst	Jenseits (EP)
8	George Lynch	Guitars at the End of the World
8	Kvelertak	Endling
8	Oomph!	Richter und Henker
8	Puddle of Mudd	Ubiquitous
8	Saliva	Revelation
8	Sylosis	A Sign of Things to Come
15	Baroness	Stone
15	Brujeria	Esto Es Brujeria
15	Corey Taylor	CMF2
15	Electric Boys	Grand Explosivos
15	Gridlink	Coronet Juniper
15	Mayhem	Daemonic Rites (live album)
15	Molybaron	Something Ominous
15	Night Verses	Every Sound Has a Color in the Valley of Night: Part 1
15	Otep	The God Slayer
15	Ronnie Romero	Too Many Lies, Too Many Masters
15	Shade Empire	Sunholy
15	Shining	Shining
15	Tesseract	War of Being
15	War of Ages	Dominion
20	Kill Devil Hill	Seas of Oblivion
22	3Teeth	EndEx
22	Annisokay	Abyss Pt I (EP)
22	Cannibal Corpse	Chaos Horrific
22	Dayshell	Pegasus
22	KEN mode	Void
22	Mercenary	Soundtrack to the End of Times
22	Profanatica	Crux Simplex
22	Rebaelliun	Under the Sign of Rebellion
22	Staind	Confessions of the Fallen
22	Thy Art Is Murder	Godlike
22	Wolves at the Gate	Lost in Translation (covers album)
29	Black Stone Cherry	Screamin' at the Sky
29	Blackbriar	A Dark Euphony
29	Code Orange	The Above
29	Dark the Suns	Raven and the Nightsky
29	Harm's Way	Common Suffering
29	KK's Priest	The Sinner Rides Again
29	Nervosa	Jailbreak
29	Nikki Stringfield	Apocrypha
29	Primordial	How It Ends
29	Red	Rated R
29	Taproot	SC\SSRS
29	Wolves in the Throne Room	Crypt of Ancestral Knowledge (EP)

=== October ===
Day	Artist	Album
6	Carnifex	Necromanteum
6	Heavy Load	Riders of the Ancient Storm
6	Heretoir	Nightsphere
6	Iron Savior	Firestar
6	October Tide	The Cancer Pledge
6	Of Mice & Men	Tether
6	Prong	State of Emergency
6	Svalbard	The Weight of the Mask
13	Amorphis	Queen of Time (Live at Tavastia 2021) (live album)
13	Beartooth	The Surface
13	Krieg	Ruiner
13	Laster	Andermans Mijne
13	On Thorns I Lay	On Thorns I Lay
13	Oni	The Silver Line
13	Ronnie Atkins	Trinity
13	Sulphur Aeon	Seven Crowns and Seven Seals
13	Sven Gali	Bombs and Battlescars
13	Theocracy	Mosaic
13	Varg	Ewige Wacht
20	The Amenta	Plague of Locus (EP)
20	Angelus Apatrida	Aftermath
20	Bloodred Hourglass	How's the Heart?
20	The Callous Daoboys	God Smiles Upon the Callous Daoboys (EP)
20	Cirith Ungol	Dark Parade
20	Dog Eat Dog	Free Radicals
20	Lynch Mob	Babylon
20	Myrkur	Spine
20	Night Ranger	40 Years and a Night with the Contemporary Youth Orchestra (live album)
20	Temperance	Hermitage – Daruma's Eyes Pt. 2
20	Within Temptation	Bleed Out
27	Autopsy	Ashes, Organs, Blood and Crypts
27	Dokken	Heaven Comes Down
27	Doro	Conqueress Forever Strong and Proud
27	End	The Sin of Human Frailty
27	Icarus Witch	No Devil Lived On
27	In This Moment	Godmode
27	King Gizzard & the Lizard Wizard	The Silver Cord
27	Mark Tremonti	Christmas Classics New & Old (covers album)
27	Obscura	A Celebration I – Live in North America (live album)
27	Of Virtue	Omen
27	Pigs Pigs Pigs Pigs Pigs Pigs Pigs	Live in New York (live album)
27	Poppy	Zig
27	Sorcerer	Reign of the Reaper

=== November ===
Day	Artist	Album
3	Angra	Cycles of Pain
3	Atreyu	A Torch in the Dark (EP)
3	Bad Wolves	Die About It
3	Dying Wish	Symptoms of Survival
3	Green Lung	This Heathen Land
3	Insomnium	Songs of the Dusk (EP)
3	Kontrust	Madworld
3	Mortuary Drape	Black Mirror
3	Serenity	Nemesis AD
3	Silent Planet	Superbloom
3	Spiritbox	The Fear of Fear (EP)
3	Suffocation	Hymns from the Apocrypha
3	Watain	Die in Fire – Live in Hell (Agony and Ecstasy Over Stockholm) (live album)
8	Nemophila	The Initial Impulse (EP)
10	Diviner	Avaton
10	Gama Bomb	Bats
10	Helmet	Left
10	Hinayana	Shatter and Fall
10	Secret Sphere	Blackened Heartbeat
10	Sodom	1982 (EP)
10	Tarja	Dark Christmas (cover album)
10	Vastum	Inward to Gethsemane
11	Mike Mangini	Invisible Signs
17	Aeternus	Philosopher
17	Celeste	Epilogue(s) (EP)
17	Corroded	Plague
17	DGM	Life
17	Eldritch	Innervoid
17	Lacey Sturm	Kenotic Metanoia
17	Nonpoint	Heartless (EP)
17	Racetraitor	Creation and the Timeless Order of Things
17	Sadus	The Shadow Inside
17	Texas in July	Without Reason (EP)
20	Impending Doom	Last Days (EP)
24	Bernie Marsden	Working Man
24	Cruciamentum	Obsidian Refractions
29	Panopticon	The Rime of Memory

=== December ===
Day	Artist	Album
1	Demoncy	Black Star Gnosis
1	Extortionist	Devoid (EP)
1	Ghost	13 Commandments (compilation album)
1	Omega Diatribe	Deviant
1	Paradise Lost	Icon 30
1	Visions of Atlantis	A Pirate's Symphony
4	Serein (MX)	Earthward (single)
4	Xibalba	Aztlán (EP)
8	Atreyu	The Beautiful Dark of Life
8	Dimmu Borgir	Inspiratio Profanus (covers album)
8	Ektomorf	Vivid Black
8	Judicator	I Am the Void (EP)
8	Polkadot Cadaver	Echoes Across the Hellscape
8	Porcupine Tree	Closure/Continuation.Live (live album)
8	Trick or Treat	A Creepy Night Live (live album)
15	Children of Bodom	A Chapter Called Children of Bodom (The Final Show in Helsinki Ice Hall 2019) (live album)
15	Evergrey	From Dark Discoveries to Heartless Portraits (compilation album)
15	Hed PE	Detox
15	Rob Arnold	Menace
15	Therion	Leviathan III
15	Troll	Trolldom
26	Die Apokalyptischen Reiter	Die Mutter des Teufels (EP)
29	Lord of the Lost	Weapons of Mass Seduction (covers album)

Preceded by 2022	Heavy Metal Timeline; 2023	Succeeded by 2024
