= Smoulder =

Smoulder may refer to:

- Smouldering, a slow, flameless form of combustion
- Smoulder (band), a Canadian metal band
- "Smoulder" (song), a 2000 song by King Adora
