= Ritual Hymns =

Studio album by Worm Shepherd
- Released: January 14, 2022
- Genres: Blackened deathcore, symphonic deathcore, atmospheric black metal, symphonic metal
- Length: 52:15
- Label: Unique Leader Records

Worm Shepherd chronology
In The Wake Ov Sòl (2020)	Ritual Hymns (2022)	The Sleeping Sun (2023)

Singles from Ritual Hymns
- 1. "The River Ov Knives" Released: January 6, 2022; 2. "A Bird in the Dusk" Released: January 14, 2022

Professional ratings
Review scores
Source	Rating
Distorted Sound	9/10
Metal Injection	8/10
New Noise Magazine	10/10

Ritual Hymns is the second album by American blackened deathcore band Worm Shepherd, released on January 14, 2022. It is the band's first album to initially be released through Unique Leader Records. The album features guest appearances by Lucca Schmerler (ex-Mental Cruelty) and Scott Ian Lewis (Carnifex).

== Track listing ==
No.	Title	Length
1.	"Ritual Hymns"	6:43
2.	"Ov Sword and Nail"	4:09
3.	"The Raven's Keep"	5:17
4.	"Chalice ov Rebirth"	4:12
5.	"Blood Kingdom"	7:11
6.	"Wilted Moon"	4:40
7.	"A Bird in the Dusk"	6:33
8.	"The River ov Knives"	5:16
9.	"Winter Sun"	8:20
Total length:		52:29

== Personnel ==
Worm Shepherd

- Devin Duarte – vocals
- Ryan Ibarra – guitar, bass
- Tre Purdue – guitar
- Brandon Cooper – guitar
- Leo McClain – drums

Guests

- Brandon Craven – vocals on track 5
- Lucca Schmerler – vocals on track 5
- Scott Ian Lewis – vocals on track 7
