= Zwielicht =

Zwielicht may refer to:

- Twilight (1940 film) (German: Zwielicht), a German drama film
- Zwielicht (album), a 2023 album by Mental Cruelty
