= In the Wake ov Sòl =

Studio album by Worm Shepherd
- Released: December 25, 2020
- Genre: Death metal, deathcore, symphonic black metal, technical death metal
- Length: 44:15
- Label: Unique Leader Records (re-release)

Worm Shepherd chronology
In the Wake ov Sòl (2020)	Ritual Hymns (2022)

Professional ratings
Review scores
Source	Rating
Dead Rhetoric	7.5/10
Distorted Sound	9/10
Metal Noise	8.5/10
Noizze	9/10

In the Wake ov Sòl is the debut album by American blackened deathcore band Worm Shepherd, released independently on December 25, 2020, before getting signed to Unique Leader Records and re-releasing the album via the label on June 4, 2021, with a previously unreleased bonus track, "Chasm Dweller". Vocalist Devin Duarte stated that he wrote the album when he was "at my emotional lowest and brought me back to the darkest places in my life. I wanted to encapsulate the hopelessness people feel with these words, so that it can have a uniting effect. I wrote all the lyrics at the location where I made an attempt on my life, and I feel that it brought me even closer to the message."

== Track listing ==
No.	Title	Length
1.	"Accursed"	5:16
2.	"In the Wake ov Sòl"	5:48
3.	"Ragnarok"	7:35
4.	"Wretchedness upon the Gates"	4:04
5.	"The Emptiness Between Stars"	4:55
6.	"The Frozen Lake"	5:48
7.	"Aether"	3:12
8.	"Loathe"	3:16
9.	"The Crimson Moon Unwithered"	4:21
Total length:		44:15

2021 re-release bonus track
No.	Title	Length
10.	"Chasm Dweller"	4:31
Total length:		48:46

== Personnel ==
Worm Shepherd

- Devin Duarte – vocals
- Ryan Ibarra – guitar, bass
- Brandon Cooper – guitar
- Leo McClain – drums

Guests

- Alex Koehler (ex-Chelsea Grin) – vocals on track 1
- David Simonich (Signs of the Swarm) – vocals on track 4
- Adam Mercer (ex-A Wake in Providence) – vocals on track 9
