= A Hill to Die Upon (album) =

Studio album by Mental Cruelty
- Released: May 28, 2021
- Genres: Deathcore; symphonic black metal; blackened death metal
- Length: 43:11
- Label: Unique Leader
- Producers: Josh Schroeder; Fabian Schuhmacher; Marvin Kessler; Nahuel Lozano

Mental Cruelty chronology
Inferis (2019)	A Hill to Die Upon (2021)	Zwielicht (2023)

Singles from A Hill to Die Upon
- 1. "Ultima Hypocrita" Released: March 6, 2021; 2. "A Hill to Die Upon" Released: April 12, 2021

Professional ratings
Review scores
Source	Rating
Distorted Sound	8/10
Gbhbl.com	9/10

A Hill to Die Upon is the third studio album by German deathcore band Mental Cruelty. It was released on May 28, 2021, through Unique Leader Records. It is the band's first album to feature guitarist Nahuel Lozano and drummer Danny Straßer, and their last album with vocalist Lucca Schmerler who was fired from the band in 2022 due to sexual abuse allegations. A music video for the track "King ov Fire" was released on April 29, 2021.

Mental Cruelty embarked on a European tour in support of the album, with bands Distant, Necrotted, Paleface Swiss, Crown Magnetar, and Reduction.

== Track listing ==
All tracks are written by Fabian Schuhmacher, Lucca Schmerler (both lyrics only), Nahuel Lozano and Marvin Kessler.

A Hill to Die Upon track listing
No.	Title	Length
1.	"Avgang"	0:57
2.	"Ultima Hypocrita"	4:31
3.	"Abadon"	5:57
4.	"King ov Fire"	3:52
5.	"Eternal Eclipse"	4:29
6.	"Death Worship"	4:37
7.	"Fossenbrate"	1:50
8.	"A Hill to Die Upon"	5:05
9.	"Extermination Campaign"	4:22
10.	"The Left Hand Path"	7:31
Total length:		43:11

== Personnel ==
Mental Cruelty

- Lucca Schmerler – vocals, lyrics
- Marvin Kessler – guitar, orchestrations, keyboards, songwriting, producer
- Nahuel Lozano – guitar, orchestrations, keyboards, songwriting, producer, engineering
- Viktor Dick – bass
- Danny Straßer – drums

Guests

- Yo Onityan – guitar solo on track 2

Other personnel

- Josh Schroeder – producer, engineering, mixing, mastering, additional keyboards
- Fabian Schuhmacher – producer, engineering, lyrics
- Adam Burke – cover art
