= Ov Sulfur =

American deathcore band

- Origin: Las Vegas, Nevada, U.S.
- Genres: Blackened deathcore; symphonic deathcore
- Years active: 2020–present
- Labels: Century Media
- Members: Ricky Hoover; Chase Wilson; Ryan "Leviathvn" Rivard; Christian Becker; Josh Bearden
- Past members: Matty Janz; Cory Walker; Taylor Adsit; Parker Adsit; James "Ding" William

Ov Sulfur is an American deathcore band formed in 2020 in Las Vegas, Nevada. The band's lineup currently consists of vocalist Ricky Hoover, guitarist and vocalist Chase Wilson, guitarist Christian Becker, bassist Josh Bearden and drummer Ryan "Leviathvn" Rivard. The band has released two studio albums with their latest being Endless, which was released on January 16, 2026 through Century Media Records and one EP. The band is known for their very anti-religious lyrical themes.

== History ==
After Ricky Hoover left Suffokate in May 2012, he would start a career of barbering. Due to problems that Hoover was suffering from such as the COVID-19 pandemic lockdown and toxic relationships, he decided to return to music and formed Ov Sulfur in 2020. In early and mid 2021, the band released its first three singles titled "Behind the Hand of God", "Bathe in the Flame" and "Oblivion". On August 6, 2021, the band released their debut EP titled Oblivion, which featured guest vocals from Tim Lambesis from As I Lay Dying and Nick Arthur from Molotov Solution. In September 2021, the band took part in its first tour with Signs of the Swarm and Worm Shepherd.

In May 2022, the band signed to German metal label Century Media and released three more singles that year titled "Wide Open", "Stained in Rot" and "Death ov Circumstance". On January 20, 2023, the band announced that their debut studio album titled The Burden Ov Faith will be released on March 24, 2023 and released a single from the album titled "Earthen", which was about Hoover's nephew who died from cancer at the age of 16. Another single off the album titled "Befouler" which featured guest vocals from Alex Terrible from Slaughter to Prevail was released on February 22, 2023. On January 17, 2024, the band released a single titled "Hivemind" which featured guest vocals from Lukas Nicolai from Mental Cruelty. The band released another single titled "Untruth" on August 27, 2024. In mid 2024, the band took part in Signs of the Swarm's Decade of the Swarm tour with Cane Hill, 156/Silence and A Wake in Providence.

The band released a single titled "Seed" on June 4, 2025. On September 26, 2025, the band released another single, "Evermore", and announced their second studio album, Endless, which was released on January 16, 2026.

== Band members ==
Current

- Ricky Hoover – vocals (2020–present)
- Chase Wilson – guitars, vocals (2020–present)
- Ryan "Leviathvn" Rivard – drums (2022–present)
- Christian Becker – guitars (2024–present)
- Josh Bearden – bass (2024–present)

Former

- Cory Walker – guitars (2020–2021)
- Taylor Adsit – bass (2020–2021)
- Parker Adsit – drums (2020–2021)
- Matty Janz – guitars, bass (2021–2022)
- James "Ding" William – bass (2022–2024)

Live

- Tre Purdue – guitars (2023–2024)

== Discography ==
=== Studio albums ===
- The Burden ov Faith (2023)
- Endless (2026)

=== EPs ===
- Oblivion (2021)

=== Singles ===
- "Behind the Hand of God" (2021)
- "Bathe in the Flame" (2021)
- "Oblivion (feat. Tim Lambesis)" (2021)
- "Wide Open (feat. Howard Jones)" (2022)
- "Stained in Rot" (2022)
- "Death ov Circumstance" (2022)
- "Earthen" (2023)
- "Befouler (feat. Alex Terrible)" (2023)
- "Hivemind (feat. Lukas Nicolai)" (2024)
- "Untruth" (2024)
- "Seed" (2025)
- "Evermore" (2025)
- "Wither" (2025)
