= Echoes of a Forlorn Land =

Studio album by Mental Cruelty
- Released: 23 October 2026
- Genres: Deathcore; melodic death metal; symphonic black metal
- Length: 44:00
- Label: Century Media
- Producers: Jens Bogren, Francesco Filligoi

Mental Cruelty chronology
| Zwielicht (2023) | Echoes of a Forlorn Land (2026) |

Singles from Zwielicht
- 1. "Raise the Raven Banner" Released: 14 August 2026; 2. "Ride of the Valkyries" Released: 8 October 2026

Professional ratings
Review scores
| Source | Rating |
|---|---|
| Boolin Tunes | 7/10 |
| Dead Rhetoric | 8.5/10 |
| Distorted Sound | 9/10 |
| Metal Hammer | 5.5/7 |
| Metal.de | 8/10 |
| Metalitalia.com | 7/10 |
| New Noise Magazine | 10/10 |
| Rock Hard | 7.5/10 |
| Time for Metal | 9.5/10 |
| Wall of Sound | 9/10 |

Echoes of a Forlorn Land is the fifth studio album by German deathcore band Mental Cruelty. It was released on 23 October 2026, through Century Media Records. It is the band's first album with drummer Jonathan Koltun, as well as their first without longtime bassist Viktor Dick. Music videos were released for the tracks "Raise the Raven Banner" and "Ride of the Valkyries" (including its intro "Dämmerbruch").

== Track listing ==
All tracks are written by Lukas Nicolai, Nahuel Lozano and Marvin Kessler, with additional writing by Jan Detemple on "Cry of Batariel".

Zwielicht track listing
| No. | Title | Length |
|---|---|---|
| 1. | "Weltennacht" | 2:07 |
| 2. | "Fenrir" | 4:21 |
| 3. | "Blood for Blood" | 3:14 |
| 4. | "The Serpent of Midgard" | 4:50 |
| 5. | "Helheim" | 3:53 |
| 6. | "Draugar" | 2:49 |
| 7. | "Raise the Raven Banner" | 6:19 |
| 8. | "Cry of Batariel" | 4:02 |
| 9. | "Frost" | 4:10 |
| 10. | "Dämmerbruch" | 1:30 |
| 11. | "Ride of the Valkyries" | 6:45 |
| Total length: | | 44:00 |

== Personnel ==
Mental Cruelty

- Lukas Nicolai – vocals
- Marvin Kessler – guitar, bass
- Nahuel Lozano – guitar
- Jonathan Koltun – drums

Additional musicians

- David Simonich (Signs of the Swarm) – vocals on "Helheim"

Other personnel

- Jens Bogren – production, mixing, mastering
- Francesco Filligoi – reamping, co-production
- Jan Detemple – recording

== Charts ==
Chart performance for Echoes of a Forlorn Land
| Chart (2026) | Peak position |
|---|---|
| German Albums (Offizielle Top 100) | 23 |
| German Rock & Metal Albums (Offizielle Top 100) | 7 |
