= The Burden ov Faith =

Studio album by Ov Sulfur
- Released: March 24, 2023
- Recorded: 2022
- Genres: Symphonic deathcore, blackened deathcore
- Length: 44:16
- Label: Century Media

Ov Sulfur chronology
Oblivion (2021)	The Burden ov Faith (2023)	Endless (2026)

Singles from Ritual Hymns
- 1. "Stained in Rot" Released: October 27, 2022; 2. "Death ov Circumstance" Released: December 7, 2022; 3. "Earthen" Released: January 20, 2023; 4. "Befouler" Released: February 22, 2023; 5. "Wide Open" Released: March 26, 2023

Professional ratings
Review scores
Source	Rating
Blabbermouth	7/10
Distorted Sound	9/10
Sputnikmusic	3.5/5

The Burden ov Faith is the debut studio album by the American deathcore band Ov Sulfur, released on March 24, 2023 through Century Media Records.

Ov Sulfur promoted the album with a North American tour in April and May 2023, supporting Chelsea Grin, Carnifex, and Left to Suffer.

== Composition ==
The album features several guest vocalists including Alex Terrible (Slaughter to Prevail) in "Befouler" and Howard Jones (Light the Torch, ex-Killswitch Engage) in "Wide Open". Vocalist Ricky Hoover stated, "I've always been a big fan of people writing their own parts for guest spots. I send them the lyrics and the vibe of the song and then encourage them to listen to the song and see what it evokes in them, I want it to feel as natural and real as possible."

"Earthen" is dedicated to Hoover's nephew, who died from cancer at the age of 16.

== Reception ==
Blabbermouth's Dom Lawson assigned the album a rating of seven and described its production as "crisp and shiny but raw and jagged enough to draw blood." Mike Kaplan of Sputnikmusic noted, "Grating highs, bellowing lows, and kind ov irritating squeals dominate the album's runtime."

== Track listing ==
No.	Title	Length
1.	"Stained in Rot"	4:14
2.	"Befouler"	3:43
3.	"Unraveling"	4:46
4.	"Death ov Circumstance"	4:33
5.	"Earthen"	5:24
6.	"A Path to Salvation?"	1:13
7.	"I, Apostate"	4:40
8.	"Wide Open"	5:07
9.	"The Inglorious Archetype"	3:46
10.	"The Burden ov Faith"	6:50
Total length:		44:16

== Personnel ==
Worm Shepherd

- Ricky Hoover – vocals
- Chase Wilson – guitar
- Matthew Janz – bass
- Ryan Rivard– drums

Guests

- Alex Terrible – vocals on track 2
- Taylor Barber – vocals on track 3
- Howard Jones – vocals on track 8
- Kyle Medina – vocals on track 10
- Lindsay Schoolcraft – vocals on track 10
