= Scarlet Aura =

Romanian heavy metal band

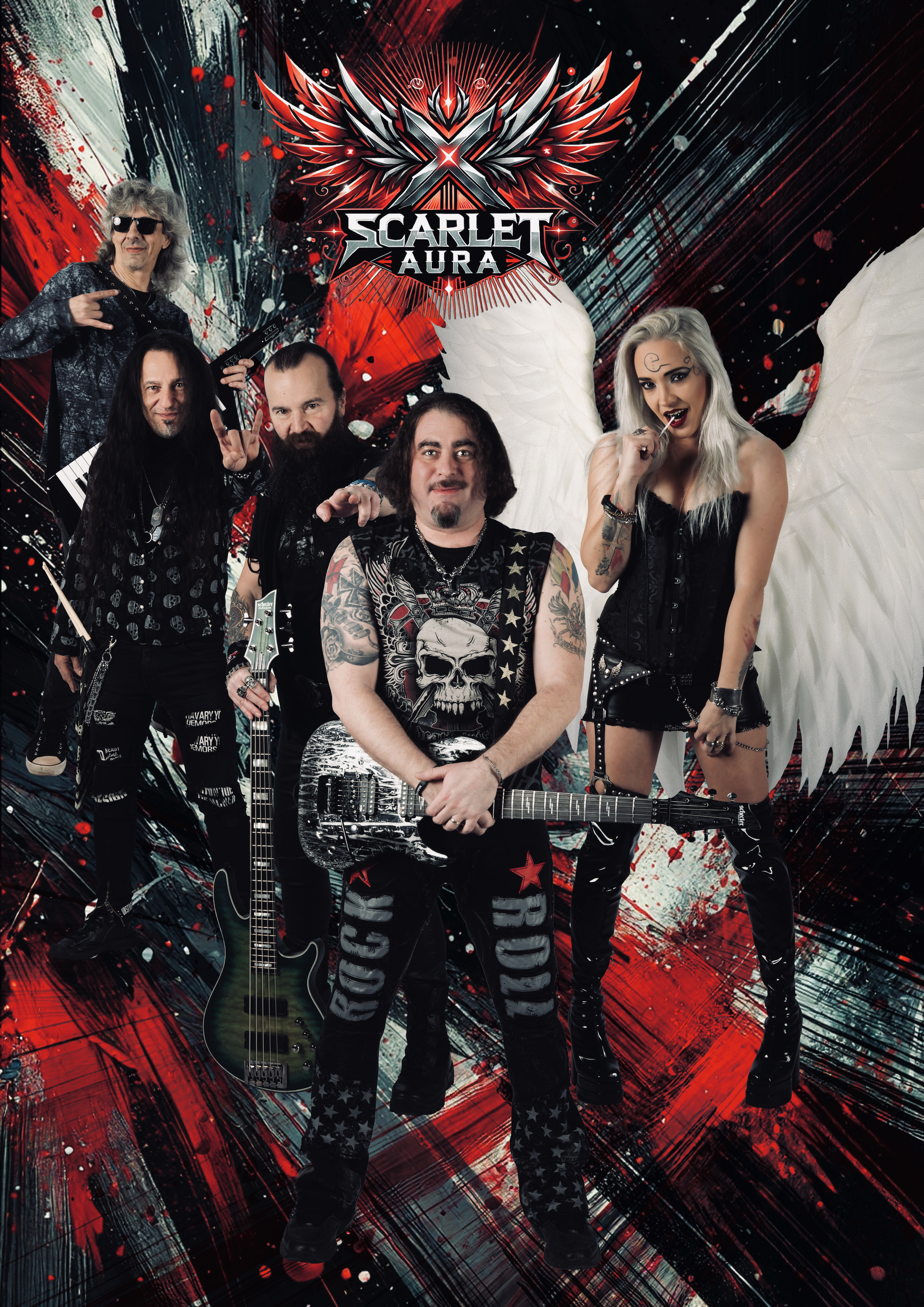
- Scarlet Aura in 2025

Background information
- Origin: Bucharest, Romania
- Genres: Heavy metal; power metal
- Years active: 2014–present
- Labels: Universal Music Romania; Pure Rock Records; Outlanders Productions Oy; Silver City Records
- Members: Aura Danciulescu – Lead Vocals; Mihai "Myke D" Danciulescu – Lead Guitars and Vocals; Rene Nistor – Bass Guitars and Vocals; Alex Paulista – Drums; Dan Lica – Keyboards
- Website: scarletaura.com

Scarlet Aura is a Romanian heavy metal band from Bucharest, Romania. The band was originally formed in 2014 under the name AURA, but later, in 2015, changed the name to Scarlet Aura. Since their inception, the band has released eight full-length albums, live DVD and two EPs. Due to band's image with wearing wings on stage, fans have named Scarlet Aura "The Angels of Romanian Rock".

== History ==
In October 2013 Aura Danciulescu (voice) and Mihai "Myke D" Danciulescu (guitar) had left the Romanian rock band Stillborn, with which they opened Bon Jovi show for 60k people in 2011 in Bucharest, to form their own musical project AURA. The first studio album named The Rock Chick was released on 20 March 2014 on Universal Music Romania and contained 10 songs sung in Romanian language. The album presented mix of alternative, pop rock and melodic/heavy metal. AURA quickly gained fanbase and in June 2014 won national selection of The Road to Kavarna to represent Romanian rock music at the Kavarna Rock Fest in Bulgaria. In July, AURA has won first place and public award at the #Black Sea Battle of the bands# at the Kavarna Rock Fest.

AURA was gaining more and more recognition after the release of their album The Rock Chick and was invited as opening act at the numerous metal concerts in Romania. In December 2015 the band announced their new name Scarlet Aura during their show in Bulgaria, opening for the Accept (band). The band started to work on their second album, releasing it in 2016 under the title Falling Sky on Pure Rock Records label. Falling Sky became the first English record for Scarlet Aura, presenting much more heavier rock sound and being produced by Roy Z. The band began touring internationally with the album and joined Tarja Turunen on her "Shadow Shows Tour 2016" as support act with nine concerts in Germany, Austria and Switzerland.

The Falling Sky tour continued in 2017 and brought the band back to Germany with their first solo concerts. In the course of the tour Scarlet Aura performed at festivals across Eastern Europe, including the Midalidare Rock Festival in Bulgaria in June 2017 alongside Doro and Gotthard.

From there the band's story continued with the new management and recording contracts – a new record deal in June 2017 with the Finnish company Outlanders Productions brought the Romanian act and their music closer to the West and North of Europe and thus the first material was promptly released – the tribute cover CD Memories, presenting and reinterpreting 11 classical Rock and Metal songs in their own unique style, together with the single "The Beast Within Me" were released in September 2017. In the second half of 2017 the band brought their first headlining, 17-concerts "The Beast Within Me" tour to Bulgaria, Romania, Germany, Slovakia and Italy. They finished 2017 tour with the opening slot at the ARENELE ROMANE in Bucharest for DIO RETURNS concert.

In February and March 2018, the band has toured across Europe as opening act for Rhapsody Reunion on their 20th Anniversary Farewell Tour for 24 shows presenting music from their latest albums Falling Sky and Memories. This tour was supported by Wacken Foundation.

In March 2018 it was announced that Scarlet Aura will join Brazilian power metal band Angra (band) as a special guests for their North America tour with 31 dates supporting their fourth album "Hot'n'Heavy". Scarlet Aura went on headlining tour in Europe in September 2018 (Ukraine, Russia and Baltics) and 26 shows headlining tour in China in November – December 2018, promoting their Hot’n’Heavy album. Hot'n'Heavy was released digitally in September 2018 and physically (digipak and double gatefold LP) in March 2019. The album marked new direction for the band, with heavy influences from symphonic and power metal to heavy metal, but within unique sound and vision of Scarlet Aura. With this album, the band brought a heavy sound, and more dark and deeper lyrics about finding your true meaning and how to be yourself, how to dare to be different and have no fear as one never be alone through music, the right to fight for what you believe in and also for love, for friendship and music.

At the same time it also set the new milestone for metal bands history: it started the first part of a conceptual trilogy called “The Book of Scarlet”, which consists of 3 albums and accompanying fantasy books. The books are written by Aura Danciulescu and combine the lyrics of the songs from the albums with the story of “Scarlet” that alongside the album immerse the audience into the amazing world of Scarlet Aura. The first book in the trilogy that went together with “Hot’n’Heavy” was “The Book of Scarlet – Ignition”. The album has received a stunning reception from the critics, reaching numerous of 9.5/10 and 9/10 notes and as the consequence – the band being featured in number of publications in Legacy, Break Out, Orkus! and other magazines.

In 2019 Scarlet Aura focused mainly on writing new material and on preparing their fifth studio album Stormbreaker, which was released on 27 March 2020 – the 2nd album from the trilogy. The first single "High In The Sky" was released in August 2019 and revealed the style, sound and the band's direction for the upcoming album. Both, single and album were released through Silver City Records – band's own record label. The second volume of the trilogy "The Book of Scarlet – Scarlets United" is scheduled to be published before the end of 2020.

In December 2019 it was announced that Scarlet Aura would join Visions of Atlantis, Edenbridge and Leecher (as opener) on 15 European shows in April 2020 to support the release of Stormbreaker album. In February 2020 the band was confirmed as special guest for Primal Fear and Freedom Call tour in September–October 2020. The tour with Primal Fear was rescheduled for September 2021 and January–February 2022. Due to health issues the entire tour was cancelled by Primal Fear.

In July 2020 Scarlet Aura in association with Silver City Records announced signing of the global Digital Distribution deal with Universal Music for the upcoming album, scheduled for 2021.

To mark the 5th anniversary of the album Falling Sky, Scarlet Aura re-recorded, remixed and re-adapted the songs, in a special edition called Fallings Sky – 5th Anniversary, which was released on 16 April 2021 by Universal Music & Silver City Records.

On 7 May the title and the release date of the upcoming album was revealed – Genesis of Time, which was released on 10 September 2021 via Universal Music and Silver City Records and became the last instalment in The Book of Scarlet Trilogy.

On 26 November 2021 band released their second Christmas single – heavy metal cover of "Rockin' Around the Christmas Tree", continuing the tradition they have set in 2020 with heavy cover of "Jingle Bell Rock". The same day Scarlet Aura joined international booking agency "Nine Lives Entertainment".

In February 2022 the band has announced the new release – double acoustic album "Under My Skin", (out on April 22, 2022, via Universal Music Romania / Silver City Records). The first single "Ya Svoboden / I Am Free" that the band did "in a universal call for peace and unity" was released on 28 February 2022. On the day of the album's release, the second single "Glimpse in the Mirror" was presented.

On 25 October, Scarlet Aura presented new live show "Rock United by Scarlet Aura", in which as special guests appeared Doro and Ralf Scheepers from Primal Fear.

Keep the tradition from the past years, in November 2022 their third Christmas cover in the metal style "Feliz Navidad" was released.

On 8 February 2023 the band announced a new single "Fire All Weapons" featuring Ralf Scheepers to be released on 24 February 2023. This collaboration was well-received, showcasing the band's commitment to evolving their sound.

On 24 March, the single "Rock în sânge și voință" was released, with the eponymous album release on 5 May. "Rock în sânge și voință" featured 11 tracks, all of which were fully written in Romanian, showcasing the band's musical roots and cultural heritage.

On 24 November band has release their traditional heavy metal Christmas cover, this time covering Mariah Carey's "All I Want for Christmas is You".

In March 2024, Scarlet Aura announced their upcoming album "Rock-Stravaganza" and released the single "Ochii Care Nu Se Văd," marking a new chapter in their musical journey. The album "Rock-Stravaganza" was officially released in June 2024, further solidifying their presence in the heavy metal scene.

In late 2024, Scarlet Aura announced their "Rock Your Christmas Tour" an innovative series of concerts set to take place in fortified churches and historic monuments across Romania, including counties such as Sibiu, Cluj, Brașov, and Timiș. This tour aims to blend the energy of rock music with the festive atmosphere of the holiday season, offering audiences a unique experience where tradition meets modernity.

The tour is scheduled to commence on December 7, 2024, at the fortified church in Cincșor, Brașov County, and will include a performance on December 13, 2024, at the Corneliu Miklosi Museum in Timișoara. These concerts are designed to transform historical sites into sanctuaries of music, providing an immersive experience that celebrates both cultural heritage and contemporary rock. By integrating traditional Christmas carols reinterpreted in their distinctive rock style, Scarlet Aura continues to push the boundaries of their genre, creating memorable experiences that resonate with diverse audiences.

== Band members ==
- Aura Danciulescu – Lead Vocals
- Mihai Danciulescu – Lead guitars and Vocals
- Rene Nistor – Bass guitars and Vocals
- Alex Paulista – Drums
- Dan Lica – Keyboards

== Discography ==
Studio albums

- 2014: The Rock Chick ( Universal Music Romania )
- 2016: Falling Sky (Pure Rock Records)
- 2017: Memories (Outlanders Productions)
- 2021: Falling Sky – 5th Anniversary (Universal Music Romania / Silver City Records)
- The Book of Scarlet Trilogy:
  - 2019: Hot'n'Heavy (Silver City Records)
  - 2020: Stormbreaker (Silver City Records)
  - 2021: Genesis of Time (Universal Music Romania / Silver City Records)
- 2022: Under My Skin (2CD) (Universal Music Romania / Silver City Records)
- 2023: Rock în Sânge și Voință (Universal Music Romania / Silver City Records)
- 2024: Rock-Stravaganza (Universal Music Romania / Silver City Records)

EPs

- 2017: The Beast Within Me (Outlanders Productions)
- 2019: High in the Sky (Silver City Records)

Live album (CD/DVD)

- 2018: Scarlet Aura – live in concert (Outlanders Productions)

Christmas Singles:

2020: Jingle Bell Rock (Universal Music Romania / Silver City Records)

2021: Rockin' Around Christmas Tree (Universal Music Romania / Silver City Records)

2022: Feliz Navidad (Universal Music Romania / Silver City Records)

2023: All I Want for Christmas is You (Universal Music Romania / Silver City Records)

2024: Happy Xmas (War is Over) (Universal Music Romania / Silver City Records)

== Books ==
- The Book of Scarlet vol.I – Ignition (2018. Second edition: 2019). ISBN 978-3964439796. 170p
- The Book of Scarlet vol.II – Scarlets United (2021). ISBN 978-6060670247. 130 p

== Awards ==
Year	Event	Category	Result	Winner
2014	Road To Kavarna (Romania)	Final	Won	
2014	Kavarna Rock Fest (Bulgaria)	Black sea Battle of the bands	Won	–

== Charts ==
"High In The Sky" reached 1st place in "Metal" and "Rock" categories and 8th place in "All Categories" in Romanian iTunes Charts on 27 May 2020.

"Stormbreaker" peaked as the N1album in "Metal" and "Rock" categories and 2nd place in "All Categories" in Romanian iTunes Charts on 27 May 2020.
