= Molybaron =

French progressive rock band

- Origin: Paris, France
- Genres: Alternative metal, progressive rock
- Years active: 2014–present
- Labels: Inside Out Music
- Members: Gary Kelly; Florian Soum; Sébastien de Saint-Angel; Camille Greneron
- Past members: Steven André; Raphael Bouglon
- Website: https://www.molybaron.com/

Molybaron is a French-Irish alt metal band.

== History ==
Molybaron was formed in late December 2014 in Paris, by Dublin born vocalist/guitarist Gary Kelly and guitarist Steven Andre. Their sound ranges from tech-grooves and anthemic metal to multi-layered atmospherics.

The band self-released Molybaron, their debut album, in May 2017. The band toured Europe with NYC metallers A Pale Horse Named Death in 2019.

The band's second studio album, 'The Mutiny', was self-released on May 21, 2021. Soon after, the band signed with the record label Inside Out Music (Sony Music) and the album was re-released on 29 October 2021.

On its first release, the album gained positive reviews from some magazines, including Metal Hammer UK, who wrote: “Diverse and satisfying, The Mutiny is a banger!”.

Rock Hard Magazine named 'The Mutiny' Album of the Month in their May edition.

The band's third album, Something Ominous, was released on September 15, 2023 via Inside Out Music . The band chose three singles from the record, namely Vampires, Something Ominous and Reality Show.

== Band members ==
=== Current members ===
- Gary Kelly – guitar, vocals (2014-present)
- Sébastien de Saint-Angel – bass (2015-present)
- Camille Greneron – drums (2019-present)
- Florian Soum - lead guitar (2023-present)

=== Past members ===
- Steven André – guitar (2014–2022)
- Raphael Bouglon – drums (2017–2018)

== Discography ==
=== Studio albums ===
2017: Molybaron
1. Fear Is Better Business Than Love – 03:08
2. Moly – 04:23
3. Let's Die Together – 03:27
4. Dance (addicted to the disco) – 04:48
5. Sleep Leaves This Place – 04:29
6. On The Other Side – 03:56
7. The Apocalypse Shop – 04:27
8. Only When Darkness Falls – 03:26
9. Incognito – 03:26
10. Mother – 03:29

2021: The Mutiny
1. Animals - 05:23
2. Lucifer - 03:23
3. Amongst The Boys And The Dead Flowers - 04:14
4. Prosperity Gospel - 04:15
5. The Lighthouse - 04:37
6. Slave To The Algorithm - 04:51
7. Something For The Pain - 04:09
8. The Hand That Feeds You - 04:10
9. Twenty Four Hours - 04:54
10. Ordinary Madness - 04:44

2023: Something Ominous
1. Something Ominous - 04:04
2. Set Alight - 03:24
3. Billion Dollar Shakedown - 03:38
4. Breakdown - 03:15
5. Anyway - 04:13
6. Daylight Dies in Darkness - 04:05
7. Dead on Arrival - 03:20
8. Pendulum - 03:33
9. Reality Show - 04:17
10. Vampires - 03:43
