= Vastum =

American death metal band

- Also known as: Corpus
- Origin: San Francisco, California, U.S.
- Genre: Death metal
- Years active: 2009–present
- Label: 20 Buck Spin
- Members: Leila Abdul-Rauf; Daniel Butler; Greg Brace; Adam Perry; Colin Tarvin
- Past members: Luca Indrio; R.D. Davies; Kyle House; Chad Gailey
- Website: vastum.bandcamp.com

Vastum is an American death metal band, formed in 2009 in San Francisco, California. The current line-up consists of guitarist and vocalist Leila Abdul-Rauf, vocalist Daniel Butler, drummer Adam Perry, guitarist Greg Brace, and bassist Colin Tarvin.

The band's lyrics deal with sexuality and eroticism, and are influenced by French writer Georges Bataille and psychoanalyst Jean Laplanche. The band's releases feature a death metal sound based on "slow to mid-tempo, grinding grooves, interspersed with up-tempo shifts, and a bellowing, enunciated growl."

The band's third studio album, Hole Below, was listed as number 19 on Pitchfork's list of "The Best Metal Albums of 2015."

== Members ==
Current

- Leila Abdul-Rauf — guitar, vocals (2009—present)
- Daniel Butler — vocals (2009—present)
- Shelby Lermo — guitar (2013—present)
- Chad Gailey — drums (2013—2015, 2018—present)
- Colin Tarvin - bass (2023—present)

Past

- Luca Indrio — bass guitar (2009—2023)
- R.D. Davies — drums (2009—2011)
- Kyle House — guitar (2009—2013)
- Adam Perry — drums (2011—2013, 2015—2018)

Timeline

== Discography ==
Studio albums

- Carnal Law (2011)
- Patricidal Lust (2013)
- Hole Below (2015)
- Orificial Purge (2019)
- Inward to Gethsemane (2023)
