= Hammerhedd =

American thrash metal band

- Origin: Prairie Village, Kansas
- Genres: Heavy metal
- Years active: 2012–present
- Members: Henry Ismert; Eli Ismert; Abe Ismert
- Website: hammerhedd.com

Hammerhedd is an American rock band from Prairie Village, Kansas. It was formed in 2012 by brothers Abe, Eli, and Henry Ismert, and the trio gained notability for the talent they showcased at a young age.

== History ==
Hammerhedd was formed in 2012 by guitarist/vocalist Henry Ismert, drummer Eli Ismert, and bassist Abe Ismert. The brothers were aged 9, 7, and 4 respectively. The members are largely self taught and managed by their mother. In 2016, a video of the band playing covers of Metallica songs went viral. Impressed with the young age of the trio, Metallica publicly reposted the video. The band subsequently turned down requests to perform on America's Got Talent and The Ellen DeGeneres Show.

In 2018, the band released their debut EP Essence of Iron. That October, they were offered a record deal by Attila frontman Chris Fronzak. In 2021, they released the LP Grand Currents, which was distributed by The Orchard. They subsequently released music videos for the singles "Foundation" and "Sediment".

In 2022, Hammerhedd was on tour with Swedish metal band In Flames. They released three singles, "Tunnel", "Fruition" and “Pioneer To Be”. The songs appeared on their sophomore LP Nonetheless, released on February 24, 2023. In February 2024, the band independently released their third album Not Important.

== Discography ==
=== Studio albums ===
- Grand Currents (2020)
- Nonetheless (2023)
- Not Important (2024)

=== Extended plays ===
- Essence of Iron (2018)
