= The Sleeping Sun =

EP by Worm Shepherd
- Released: August 18, 2023
- Genres: Black metal, symphonic deathcore, symphonic death metal, blackened death metal
- Length: 31:07
- Label: Unique Leader Records

Worm Shepherd chronology
Ritual Hymns (2022)	The Sleeping Sun (2023)	Hunger (2024)

Singles from The Sleeping Sun
- 1. "The Frozen Lake Pt. II (The Ruined)" Released: March 29, 2023; 2. "The Dying Heavens" Released: July 26, 2023

Professional ratings
Review scores
Source	Rating
Distorted Sound	8/10
Ghost Cult Magazine	7/10
Sonic Perspectives	7.8/10

The Sleeping Sun is an EP by American blackened deathcore band Worm Shepherd, released on August 18, 2023. Singles and music videos were released for the songs "The Frozen Lake Pt. II (The Ruined)" and "The Dying Heavens".

== Track listing ==
No.	Title	Length
1.	"The Frozen Lake Pt. II (The Ruined)"	7:35
2.	"The Broken Earth"	4:53
3.	"The Tortured Path"	5:14
4.	"The Dying Heavens"	6:32
5.	"The Parting Sea"	6:53
Total length:		31:07

== Personnel ==
Worm Shepherd

- Devin Duarte – vocals
- Tre Purdue – guitar, bass
- Alex Nourse – drums
