= More Inspirations =

Studio album by Saxon
- Released: 24 March 2023
- Recorded: 2022
- Studio: Brockfield Hall, The Big Silver Barn
- Genre: Heavy metal
- Length: 39:50
- Label: Silver Lining Music
- Producer: Biff Byford

Saxon chronology
Carpe Diem (2022)	More Inspirations (2023)	Hell, Fire and Damnation (2024)

Singles from More Inspirations
- 1. "The Faith Healer" Released: 16 January 2023; 2. "Razamanaz" Released: 22 March 2023

More Inspirations is the second cover album by the English heavy metal band Saxon, released on 24 March 2023.

== Background ==
As its predecessor Inspirations, the album consists of covers from the 1960s and 1970s. The Faith Healer was released as a single on 16 January 2023.

== Reception ==
Professional ratings
Review scores
Source	Rating
Maximum Volume Music	8/10
powermetal.de	6.5/10

More Inspirations was the band's first studio album since Call to Arms (2011) to not enter the UK Albums Chart top 100. As with every Saxon studio album in the last 16 years, More Inspirations entered the charts in all of the three German-speaking countries.

== Track listing ==
More Inspirations track listing
No.	Title	Music	Original artist	Length
1.	"We've Gotta Get Out of This Place"	Barry Mann, Cynthia Weil	The Animals, 1965	3:39
2.	"The Faith Healer"	Alex Harvey, Hugh McKenna	The Sensational Alex Harvey Band, 1973	6:28
3.	"From the Inside"	Alice Cooper, Bernie Taupin, David Foster, Dick Wagner	Alice Cooper, 1978	3:36
4.	"Chevrolet"	Billy F. Gibbons	ZZ Top, 1972	3:59
5.	"Substitute"	Pete Townshend	The Who, 1966	4:01
6.	"Gypsy"	Mick Box, David Byron	Uriah Heep, 1970	3:13
7.	"Man on the Silver Mountain"	Ritchie Blackmore, Ronnie James Dio	Rainbow, 1975	3:52
8.	"Detroit Rock City"	Paul Stanley, Bob Ezrin	Kiss, 1976	4:16
9.	"Razamanaz"	Dan McCafferty, Darrell Sweet, Manny Charlton, Pete Agnew	Nazareth, 1973	3:26
10.	"Tales of Brave Ulysses"	Eric Clapton, Martin Sharp	Cream, 1967	3:20

== Personnel ==
Saxon

- Biff Byford – lead vocals
- Paul Quinn – guitars
- Doug Scarratt – guitars
- Nibbs Carter – bass
- Nigel Glockler – drums

== Charts ==
Chart (2023)	Peak position
Austrian Albums (Ö3 Austria)	63
Belgian Albums (Ultratop Wallonia)	108
German Albums (Offizielle Top 100)	30
Scottish Albums (OCC)	15
Swiss Albums (Schweizer Hitparade)	23
UK Independent Albums (OCC)	5
UK Rock & Metal Albums (OCC)	5
