= Bridear =

Japanese power metal band

- Origin: Fukuoka, Japan
- Genres: Power metal
- Years active: 2011–present
- Labels: Movement; Bakuon!; UMJ/War Rock; Red Hill; Avex Trax; IYT; Setsuzoku; Psychomanteum
- Members: Kimi; Haru; Ayumi; Natsumi; Moe
- Past members: Mitsuru; Kai; Misa; Misaki; Vivi
- Website: Official website

Bridear (stylized as BRIDEAR) is a Japanese power metal band from Fukuoka, formed in 2011. It currently consists of singer Kimi, guitarists Moe and Ayumi, bassist Haru, and drummer Natsumi. They are represented by Zest and release music under IYT Records.

== History ==
Bridear was founded in Fukuoka in 2011 by singer Kimi, guitarist Mitsuru, and bassist Haru. Support drummer Kai became an official member in February 2012. Second guitarist Misa joined the band in April, and Bridear had their first live that same month at Spiral Factory. Kimi, Haru, and Kai were previously in a band together, while Mitsuru and Misa were recruited from a website specifically for finding musicians. The demo "Pray/Another Name" was released in August 2012. First single "Thread of the Light/Roulette", released through Rock Stakk, and the extended play Overturn the Doom, through Movement Records, were released the following year.

In the subsequent two years, the single "Light in the Dark/No Salvation" (2014) and concert video Dear Bride (2015) were released. In March 2016, the band released their debut album, Baryte, which was released by Radtone Music, and promoted with an extensive tour of Japan. The EP released in 2017, Rise, was also released by Bakuon! Baku-on. Ca. Citing musical differences, Misa left Bridear following an October 28, 2017 concert. She was replaced by Misaki, who made her live debut with the band on April 22, 2018. Another EP, Helix, was released on April 11, 2018, this time on Universal Music Japan's War Rock label. Another concert video, Live Tour 2018 Marcasite, was also released in 2018. After seven years, Mitsuru left the band after their December 30, 2018 concert, citing various differences about the direction of the band, both musical and otherwise. In 2019, Bridear joined the Zest talent management agency and switched to the label Avex Trax and released their second studio album Expose Your Emotions at the end of the same year.

In May 2021, the band released their third album, Bloody Bride, which was released internationally by Setsuzoku Records. In September and October 2021, the group toured several European cities. Misaki took medical leave in June 2022 and announced her departure from the band on July 11, replaced immediately by Moe.

== Style ==
According to Fabian Zeitlinger from Metalinside.de, Bridear stand out from other Japanese all-girl rock bands with their more modern sound, described as more of a "metalized" version of Band-Maid than melodic power metal like Aldious or Lovebites. On Bloody Bride, the group oscillates between aggressive power metal with double bass and poppy alternative metal. The band's lyrics are written in both Japanese and English. In a review on JRock News, Bloody Bride is described as a "marriage" between hard rock and progressive metal and a worthy successor to Expose Your Emotions. Shawn Kupfer, in his review for Idobi, describes the music as "fast-paced power metal with pop music sensibilities", evocative of X Japan's Blue Blood era, and concluded that Bridear's music shares the DNA of the New Wave of American Heavy Metal while also breaking new ground.

== Members ==
Current members

- Kimi – lead vocals (2011–present)
- Haru – bass, backing vocals (2011–present)
- Ayumi – guitar, backing vocals (2019–present)
- Natsumi – drums (2019–present)
- Moe – guitar (2022–present)

Former members

- Mitsuru – guitar (2011–2018)
- Kai – drums (2012–2019)
- Misa – guitar (2012–2017)
- Misaki – guitar (2018–2022)
- Yuri – drums (2019)
- Vivi – drums (2019)

== Discography ==
Bridear discography
- Studio albums: 5
- EPs: 3
- Live albums: 1
- Singles: 4
- Video albums: 2

=== Studio albums ===
Title	Album details	Peak chart positions		
Title	Album details	JPN Oricon	JPN Billboard Hot	JPN Billboard Top
Baryte	Released: March 23, 2016; Label: Bakuon! Baku-on. Ca	63	—	62
Expose Your Emotions	Released: December 4, 2019; Label: Avex Trax, Setsuzoku Records	109	—	—
Bloody Bride	Released: April 14, 2021; Label: Avex Trax, Setsuzoku Records	62	100	51
Aegis of Athena	Released: April 20, 2022; Label: Avex Trax, Setsuzoku Records	52	68	49
Born Again	Released: June 28, 2024; Label: IYT Records, Psychomanteum Records	-	-	-
"—" denotes a recording that did not chart.

=== EPs ===
Title	Album details	Peak chart positions	
Title	Album details	JPN Oricon	JPN Billboard Top
Overturn the Doom	Released: December 18, 2013; Label: Movement Records	285	—
Rise	Released: March 15, 2017; Label: Bakuon! Baku-on. Ca	70	—
Helix	Released: April 11, 2018; Label: Universal Music Japan/War Rock	72	69
"—" denotes a recording that did not chart.

=== Singles ===
Title	Year	Peak chart positions	Album
Title	Year	JPN Oricon	Album
"Pray/Another Name"	2012	—	Non-album singles
"Thread of the Light/Roulette"	2012	—	Non-album singles
"Light in the Dark/No Salvation"	2014	115	Non-album singles
"—" denotes a recording that did not chart.

==== Digital singles ====
Title	Year	Album
"Ignite"	2017	Rise

=== DVD ===
Title	Details	Peak positions
Title	Details	JPN Oricon
Dear Bride	Released: April 22, 2015; Label: Movement Records	114
Live Tour 2018 Marcasite	Released: August 8, 2018; Label: Red Hill Recordings	99
