= Vintersea =

American metal band

- Also known as: Asterion (2014)
- Origin: Portland, Oregon, United States
- Genres: Melodic death metal, progressive metal, blackened death metal, post-metal
- Years active: 2014–present
- Members: Jeremy Spencer; Jorma Spaziano; Riley Nix; Karl Whinnery; Kayla Dixon
- Past members: Avienne Low; Duncan McCue; Nick Clark

Vintersea is an American heavy metal band from Portland, Oregon, formed in 2014 under the name Asterion.

== History ==
Guitarist Riley Nix and drummer Jeremy Spencer have been playing together since their high school days. As their previous band broke up, they placed an ad on Craigslist in the summer of 2014. Shortly thereafter, singer Avienne Low, who had just relocated to the United States from Malaysia, became aware of the two and joined them. Another member was guitarist Jorma Spaziano, who had moved to Oregon from the east coast of the United States. The first rehearsals and the first performances under the name Asterion took place together. The band would later change its name to Vintersea.

In late 2019, after self-releasing their EP Constellations and debut album The Gravity of Fall within the prior five years, the group signed a record deal with M-Theory Audio, the same year their second album Illuminated was released. The label was introduced to the band two years earlier through a gig in Sacramento, California, brought together by a recommendation from the group Graveshadow, who was also signed to this label. After the album's release, appearances followed with The Browning, among others.

The band released their third album, Woven into Ashes, on May 5, 2023.

On May 17, 2024, Vintersea and Avienne announced through their social media channels that she was leaving the band:

After ten years of memories, three full-length albums, five tours across North America, and countless wonderful experiences with fans around the world, Avienne has made the decision to step down as the vocalist of VINTERSEA. We will miss Avienne as a performer, as a writer, and as a friend. We will be holding an ambitious audition process for a new vocalist, with details in a forthcoming post. As always, we are grateful to our incredible fans for your continued support and kindness.

A few hours later, the band officially announced auditions for their vacant vocalist position. On October 4, 2024 the band announced new vocalist, Kayla Dixon.

== Musical style and influences ==
According to thecirclepit.com, on The Gravity of Fall, the band tries to render appealing landscape imagery in song form, combining elements of progressive metal, black metal, death metal, and post-metal. In the songs, the group creates majestic and massive soundscapes. Sebastian Schilling from Rock Hard noticed influences from post-metal, death metal, and black metal while listening to Illuminated. The band's sound and appearance would position them in modern progressive metal, combining "fat blast passages" with "fragile acoustic parts" and "approaches of Devin Townsend-like bombast". A notable characteristic is Low's pleasant singing voice, where she dominates growls and screams. Overall, the music is recommended by Schilling for fans of Ihsahn, Devin Townsend, and Periphery. In the following issue, Andreas Schiffmann wrote that the second album, in contrast to its predecessor, was no longer written solely by Riley Nix. In an interview with him, Avienne Low stated that Illuminated is about "a group of conditioned people who live in isolation and believe they are in paradise while being fed propaganda and feigned security".

Influences include Linkin Park, The Chariot, Rolo Tomassi, Ne Obliviscaris, and Periphery.

== Discography ==
=== As Asterion ===
- 2014: Constellations (EP, self-released)

=== As Vintersea ===
- 2017: The Gravity of Fall (album, self-released)
- 2019: Illuminated (album, M-Theory Audio)
- 2023: Woven into Ashes (album, M-Theory Audio)

=== Music videos ===
Year	Song	Album
2017	Skies Set Ablaze	The Gravity of Fall
2018	The Host	The Gravity of Fall
2018	Entities	The Gravity of Fall
2018	The Gravity of Fall	The Gravity of Fall
2019	Illuminated	Illuminated
2019	Old Ones	Illuminated
2020	Befallen	Illuminated
2020	Fiery Tongue	Illuminated
2020	The Holy Procession	The Gravity of Fall
2021	Crack of Light	Illuminated
2021	Spawn Awakening	Illuminated
2023	At the Gloaming Void	Woven into Ashes
2023	Unveiling Light	Woven into Ashes
2023	Into the Horizon	Woven into Ashes
2023	Lonesome Tide	Woven into Ashes
2024	Devil's Churn	Woven into Ashes
2024	No Tomorrow	Woven into Ashes
