= Judiciary (band) =

American hardcore band

- Origin: Lubbock, Texas, U.S.
- Genres: Hardcore punk; metalcore; crossover thrash; thrash metal
- Years active: 2013–present
- Label: Closed Casket Activities
- Members: Austin Scott-Looney; Israel Garza; Jake Collinson; Juan Vazquez; Nolan Mobley
- Past members: Kyle Calfin; Jerel Ramirez; Jimmy LaDue
- Website: www.judiciarytx.com

Judiciary is an American hardcore punk band formed in Lubbock, Texas, in 2013.

== History ==
Judiciary were formed in Lubbock, Texas in 2013. In 2014, they recorded and released a demo, named Demo '14. Their first EP, The Axis of Equality, was released in 2016, and in 2017 they released a split EP with the Canadian hardcore punk band Mortality Rate.

In 2018, they signed with Closed Casket Activities, and released the single "Temple" from their upcoming album on the label. The following year, they released Surface Noise, their first studio album. Surface Noise was produced and engineered by Taylor Young, and mixed and mastered by Arthur Rizk, who previously worked with the American thrash metal band Power Trip. According to the band, the name of the album is a reference to a lyric from the song "It's a Mistake" by Men At Work.

They announced the follow up to Surface Noise in 2023, named Flesh + Blood, and released the single "Engulfed". The album was released through Closed Casket Activities on March 10 that year. Flesh + Blood was produced and engineered by Arthur Rizk, and was mixed and mastered by Will Putney.

== Musical style ==
Judiciary have been described as hardcore punk, metalcore, crossover thrash, and thrash metal.

== Band members ==
=== Current ===
- Jake Collinson – vocals (2013–present)
- Israel Garza – rhythm guitar (2013–present)
- Austin Scott-Looney – drums (2013–present)
- Juan Vazquez – lead guitar (2024–present), bass (2023–2024)
- Nolan Mobley – bass (2024–present)

== Discography ==
=== Studio albums ===
- Surface Noise (2019)
- Flesh + Blood (2023)

=== EPs ===
- The Axis of Equality (2016)
- Split (2017, split with Mortality Rate)
- Stalagmite Angels (2026)

=== Singles ===
- "Temple" (2019)
- "Social Crusade" (2019)
- "War (Time is Nigh)" (2019)
- "Engulfed" (2023)
- "Paradigm Piercer" (2023)
- "Knife in the Dirt" (2023)
- “Wall of Skulls” (2026)
- ”Death Knell” (2026)

=== Demos ===
- Demo '14 (2014)
