= Bio-Cancer =

Greek thrash metal band

- Origin: Athens, Greece
- Genres: Thrash metal
- Years active: 2010–present
- Labels: Hammerheart; Candlelight; Athens Thrash Attack
- Members: Giannis Lagoutaris; Thanasis Andreou; Lefteris Hatziandreou; Stavros Marinos; Tomek Solomonidis
- Website: biocancer.bigcartel.com

Bio-Cancer is a Greek thrash metal band from Athens, formed in late 2010.

== History ==
Among their earliest releases was a contribution to the compilation album Thrash Or Be Thrashed Vol.2. They released their first album, Ear Piercing Thrash, in 2012 under Athens Thrash Attack Records, and their second album, Tormenting the Innocent, under Candlelight Records in 2015. A music video for "F(r)iends or Fiends", from Tormenting the Innocent, was released. While Metal Forces described Tormenting the Innocent as featuring a rather generic form of thrash metal, New Noise Magazine was much more favorable, awarding the album a perfect score and praising Bio-Cancer as one of the "cutting edge thrash metal bands". On 8 September 2023 the band released their third album, Revengeance. Ghost Cult Magazine called the album "one of the most memorable thrash releases of the year" giving it a 7/10 rating overall.

== Musical style ==
Brave Words & Bloody Knuckles and Stormbringer.at consider the band's style as not particularly innovative, but well-written. Venia Mag found the band energetic and technically precise but with a monotonous sound. Bio-Cancer have toured with several popular metal acts such as Sodom, Onslaught, Rotting Christ, Xentrix, Artillery, and Marduk. The band's musical style has been compared to that of other underground Greek bands Flames, Acid Death, Suicidal Angels, and Insidead, as well as other bands such as Sodom, Kreator, Testament, and Shrapnel. Brave Words & Bloody Knuckles noted that Bio-Cancer mixes elements of Teutonic thrash metal with elements of Bay Area thrash metal, and that Lefteris uses some speed metal and black metal style vocals that add some variety to the band's sound. Metal.de compared Lefteris's vocals style to those of Chance Garnette of Skeletonwitch. Ghost Cult Magazine describe their 2023 album as having "Melodeath-style riffing" as well as "accomplished and surprisingly smooth bass lines" and described the vocals as "often completely incomprehensible".

== Members ==
- Giannis Lagoutaris – bass, backing vocals
- Thanasis Andreou – guitar
- Lefteris Hatziandreou – vocals
- Stavros Marinos – guitar, backing vocals
- Tomek Solomonidis – drums

== Discography ==
=== Studio albums ===
- Ear Piercing Thrash (2012, Athens Thrash Attack)
- Tormenting The Innocent (2015, Candlelight Records)
- Revengeance (2023, Hammerheart Records)

=== Compilation albums ===
- And Covers for All... A Greek Tribute to Metallica (2013, Metal Hammer) – Dyers Eve
