= John Diva and the Rockets of Love =

German musical group

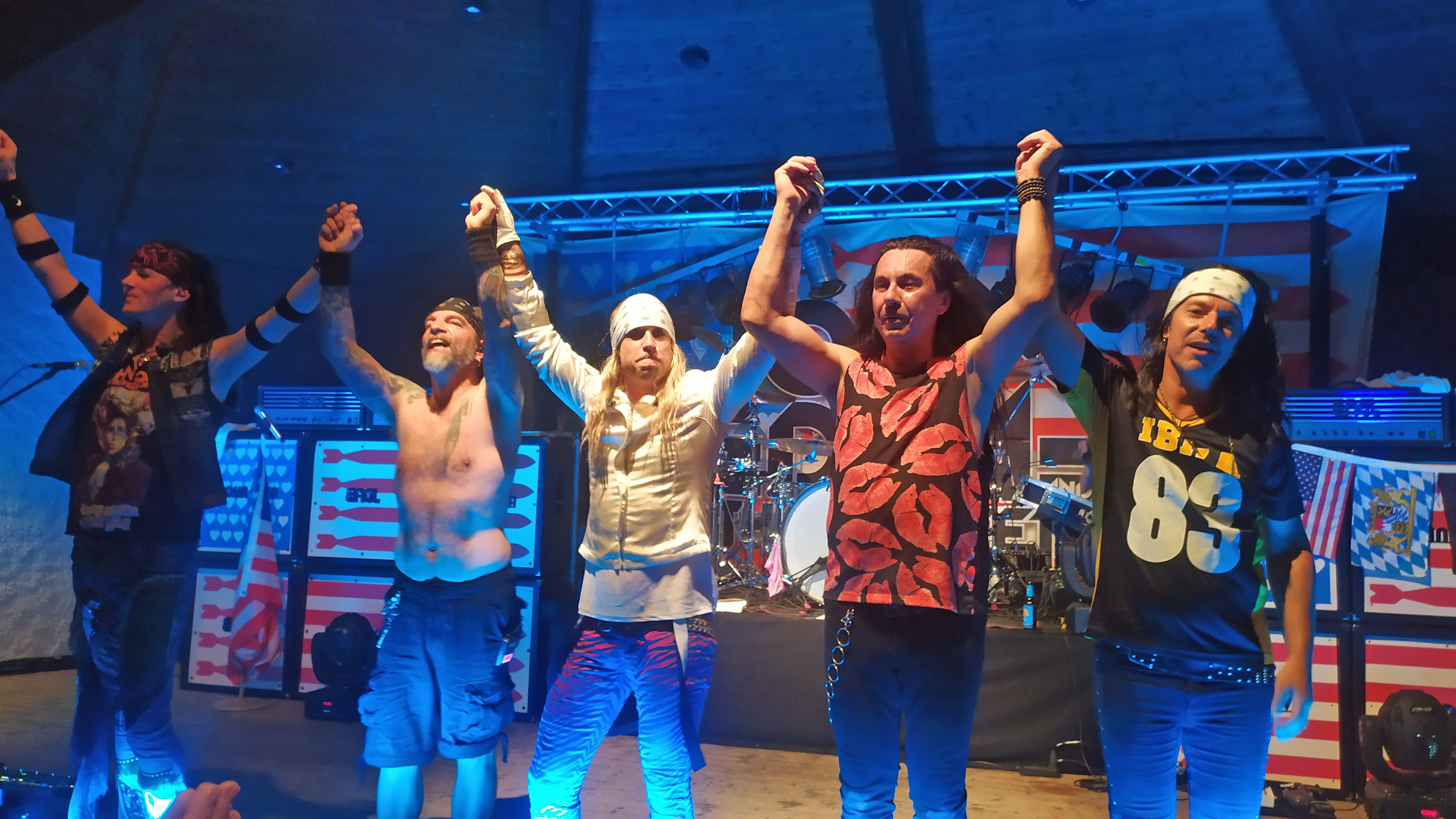
- John Diva and the Rockets of Love in Bad Hindelang 2022

Background information
- Origin: Germany
- Years active: 2009-present
- Label: SPV / Steamhammer
- Members: John Diva; Snake Rocket; Remmie Martin; Carsten Stepanowicz; Marcus Coolman jr.
- Past members: Vic Chains; Lee Stingray jr.; J.J. Love (Julio Juan Amor)
- Website: johndiva.com

John Diva & the Rockets of Love is a German glam metal band founded in 2009. Sometimes abbreviated to JDATROL, the five-piece has made it its self-described mission to evoke "the halcyon days of Van Halen, Bon Jovi, Kiss, and Whitesnake, blessed with a smidge of Def Leppard and Mötley Crüe."

== Background ==
According to the band's official fictitiuous biography, founding member and lead singer John Diva was brought up in San Diego, California by a single mother heavily involved in the city’s Rock scene. His father, a showband musician who toured the US casino circuit, was absent for most of his life. Through his mother, he first came in contact with music.

=== Since 2013 ===
In Europe, the band first popped up in 2013, bringing a full catalog of classic rock songs to stages across the continent. The band played the Wacken Open Air a total of three times.

=== Mama Said Rock Is Dead ===
The band released their debut album Mama Said Rock Is Dead on February 8, 2019, preceded by its lead single "Lolita", which was made available on November 23, 2018.

To support the release, the band toured Europe throughout the end of 2018 and most of 2019, playing nearly 60 shows.

=== Critical reception and performance ===
The album received favorable reviews in the USA, with Music Guru Radio rating it 5 out of 5 stars. Chris McCormick of Madness To Creation remarked how hard it was “to believe this is a new addition to rock and not an album from the 1980s.“

Sean Bennett from Australian website The Rockpit lauded how the band sounds “tight throughout, with fantastic guitar work & vocals, all the while being backed by solid bass & drum work."

British outlets also overall recommended the release to their audiences, with Midlands Metalheads giving it a 5 out of 5 rating. Ghost Cult Mag called the album "fun", but noted a lack of distinction from its inspirations.

In Germany, Mama Said Rock Is Dead entered the official album charts at 24. The German edition of international music magazine Metal Hammer evoked comparisons to Steel Panther and referred to the band as a “live phenomenon“.

Confronted about the sexual nature of his lyrics in light of the Me Too era, Diva acknowledged the importance of the movement but added that "sex positivity doesn’t exclude respect. As a rockstar, you have a certain amount of power that you have to wield responsibly.“

=== American Amadeus ===
The band recently announced a new album, American Amadeus, with its release date set to 4 September 2020. A tour of Germany was planned for November and December 2020. Again in Germany a full concert is scheduled in Bad Salzschlift (region of Hessen, near Fulda) on 14 November 2025

== Discography ==
=== Albums ===
- Live At Wacken (July 2017)
- Mama Said Rock Is Dead (8 February 2019)
- American Amadeus (2021)
- The Big Easy (2023)
- Your Favorite Drug (2026)

=== Singles & Videos ===
- "Lolita" (23 November 2018)
- "Rock’n’Roll Heaven" (18 January 2019)
- "Blinded" (15 March 2019)
- "Rocket Of Love" (24 May 2019)
- "Wild Wild Life" (23 September 2019)
- "Bling Bling Marilyn" (11 September 2020)
- "Drip Drip Baby" (23 October 2020)
- "American Amadeus" (4 December 2020)

=== Tours ===
- Viva La Diva-Tour (November 2017 - April 2018)
- Europe In Ecstasy-Tour (support for Kissin Dynamite, March 2019 - April 2019)
- Mama Said Rock Is Dead-Tour (October 2019 - December 2019)
- American Amadeus release shows (September 2020 - cancelled)
- American Amadeus-Tour (November 2020 - December 2020 - cancelled)
