= Flesh + Blood (Judiciary album) =

Studio album by Judiciary
- Released: March 10, 2023
- Genre: Hardcore punk; metalcore
- Length: 31:25
- Label: Closed Casket Activities
- Producer: Arthur Rizk

Judiciary chronology
Surface Noise (2019)	Flesh + Blood (2023)

Singles from Flesh + Blood
- 1. "Engulfed" Released: January 19, 2023; 2. "Paradigm Piercer" Released: February 8, 2023; 3. "Knife in the Dirt" Released: February 23, 2023

Flesh + Blood is the second studio album by American hardcore punk band Judiciary. It was released on March 10, 2023, through Closed Casket Activities.

== Background ==
Flesh + Blood was announced on January 19, 2023, with the lead single "Engulfed". Two more singles were released for the album, "Paradigm Piercer" on February 8, and "Knife in the Dirt" on February 23. Flesh + Blood was released on March 10. It was produced by Arthur Rizk, who previously worked with the thrash metal band Power Trip, and mastered by Will Putney. The album has been described as hardcore punk and metallic hardcore.

== Critical reception ==
Tom Breihan of Stereogum praised the album, stating "There's a whole lot of shredding on Flesh + Blood, and the breakdowns are just masterfully violent." David Rodriguez of EverythingIsNoise was also positive, writing "This is battering, hammering metallic hardcore, fine-tuned to a surgical degree where every note is weighty and nothing relents until your music player dies."

== Track listing ==
Flesh + Blood track listing
No.	Title	Length
1.	"Flesh"	2:57
2.	"Blood"	2:00
3.	"Engulfed"	2:41
4.	"Paradigm Piercer"	3:43
5.	"Knife in the Dirt"	3:32
6.	"Stare into the Sun"	2:32
7.	"Cobalt"	2:55
8.	"Steel Hand God"	3:09
9.	"Obsidian"	3:28
10.	"Eschatos Hemera"	4:24
Total length:		32:25

== Personnel ==
Judiciary

- Jake Collinson – vocals
- Jimmy LaDue – lead guitar
- Israel Garza – rhythm guitar
- Kyle Calfin – bass
- Austin Scott-Looney – drums

Additional personnel

- Arthur Rizk – production
- Will Putney – mixing, mastering
