= Russkaja =

Austrian ska punk band

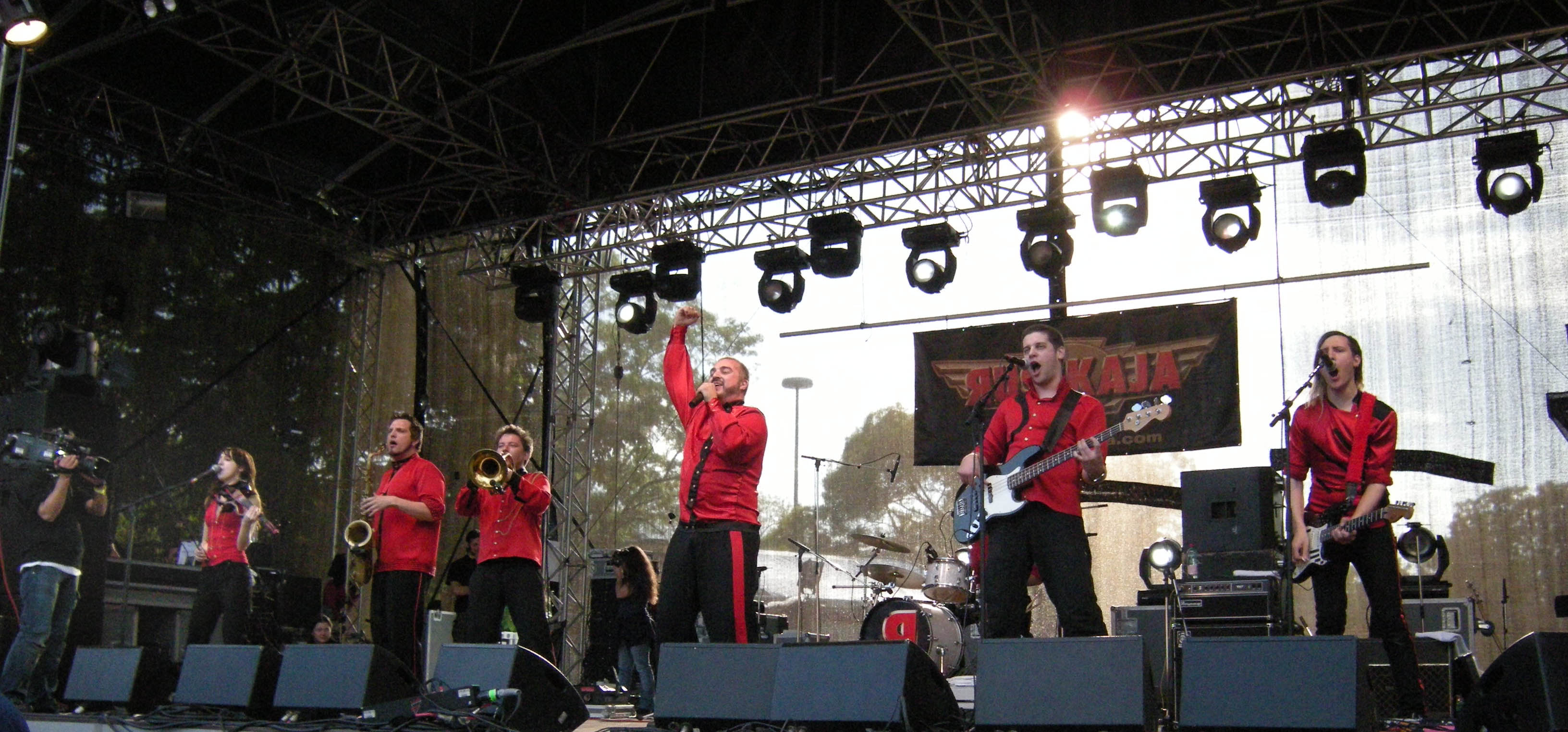
- Russkaja performing in 2008

Background information
- Origin: Vienna, Austria
- Genres: Ska punk; gypsy punk; folk punk; folk metal
- Years active: 2005–2023
- Labels: Chat Chapeau; Napalm
- Past members: Georgij Makazaria; Dimitrij Miller; Engel Mayr; Lea-Sophie Fischer; Rainer Gutternigg; H-G. Gutternigg; Mario Stübler; Ilse Riedler; Pavel Shalman; Titus Vadon; Alex Schuster; Manfred Franzmeier; Zebo Adam; Christoph Schödl; Antonia-Alexa Georgiew; Ulrike Müllner; Rainer Gutternigg

Russkaja (stylized as ЯUSSKAJA) were a ska punk band from Vienna, Austria. The band calls its sound "Russian Turbo Polka Metal." It has drawn on polka, ska, fanfare, pop, rock, and traditional Russian music. The band was founded in 2005 by former Stahlhammer vocalist Georgij Makazaria. Signed to the independent Austrian label Chat Chapeau since 2006, they later changed to Napalm Records. They are most known in Austria for being the stationary band of the late-night comedy show "Willkommen Österreich".

The band broke up on February 3, 2023 (the same day they released their seventh album, Turbo Polka Party) because they no longer wanted to use their "satirical use of Soviet symbols and language" due to public criticism tied to the ongoing Russian invasion of Ukraine.

== Members ==
Russkaja live at Rockharz Open Air 2019

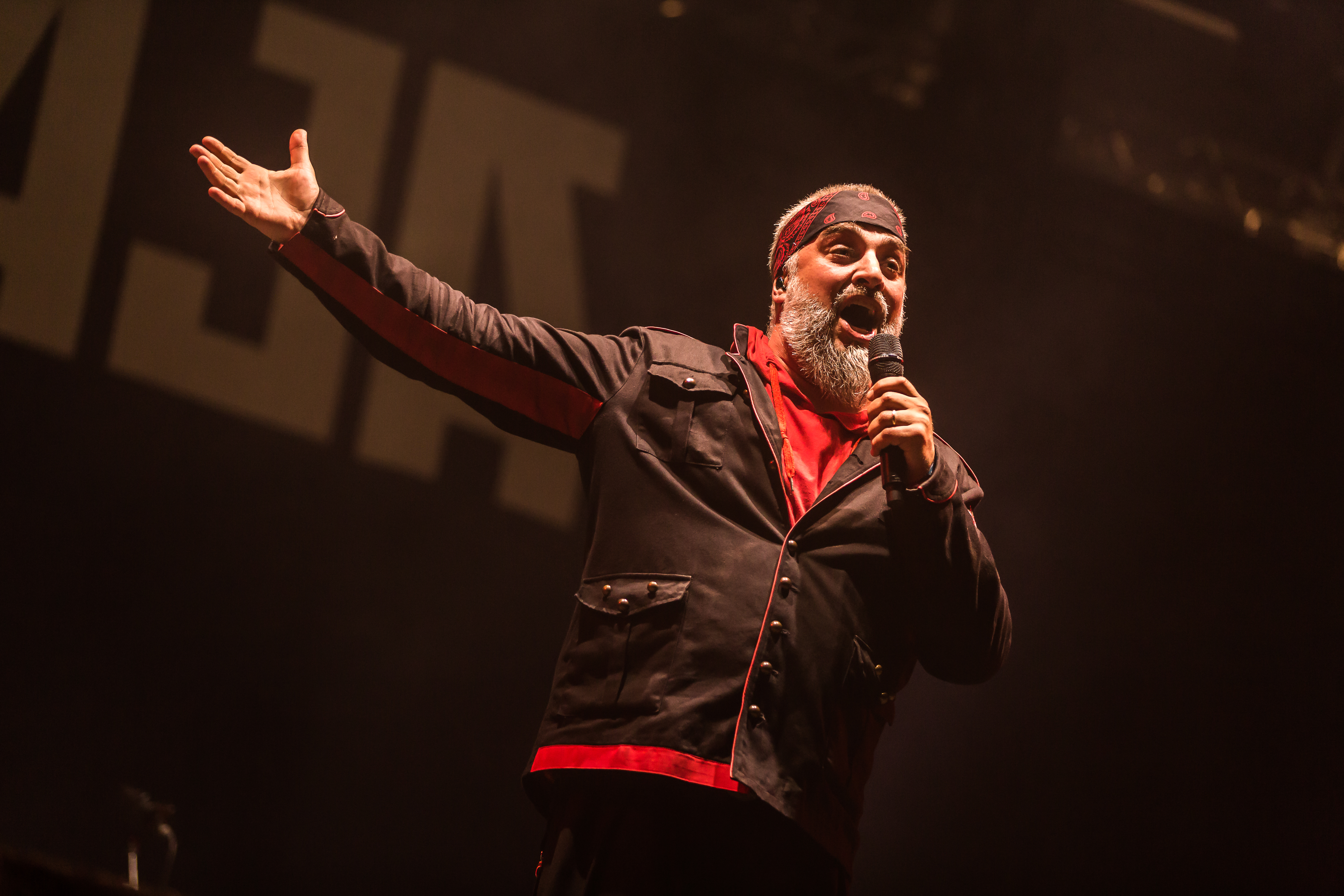
Singer Georgij Alexandrowitsch Makazaria

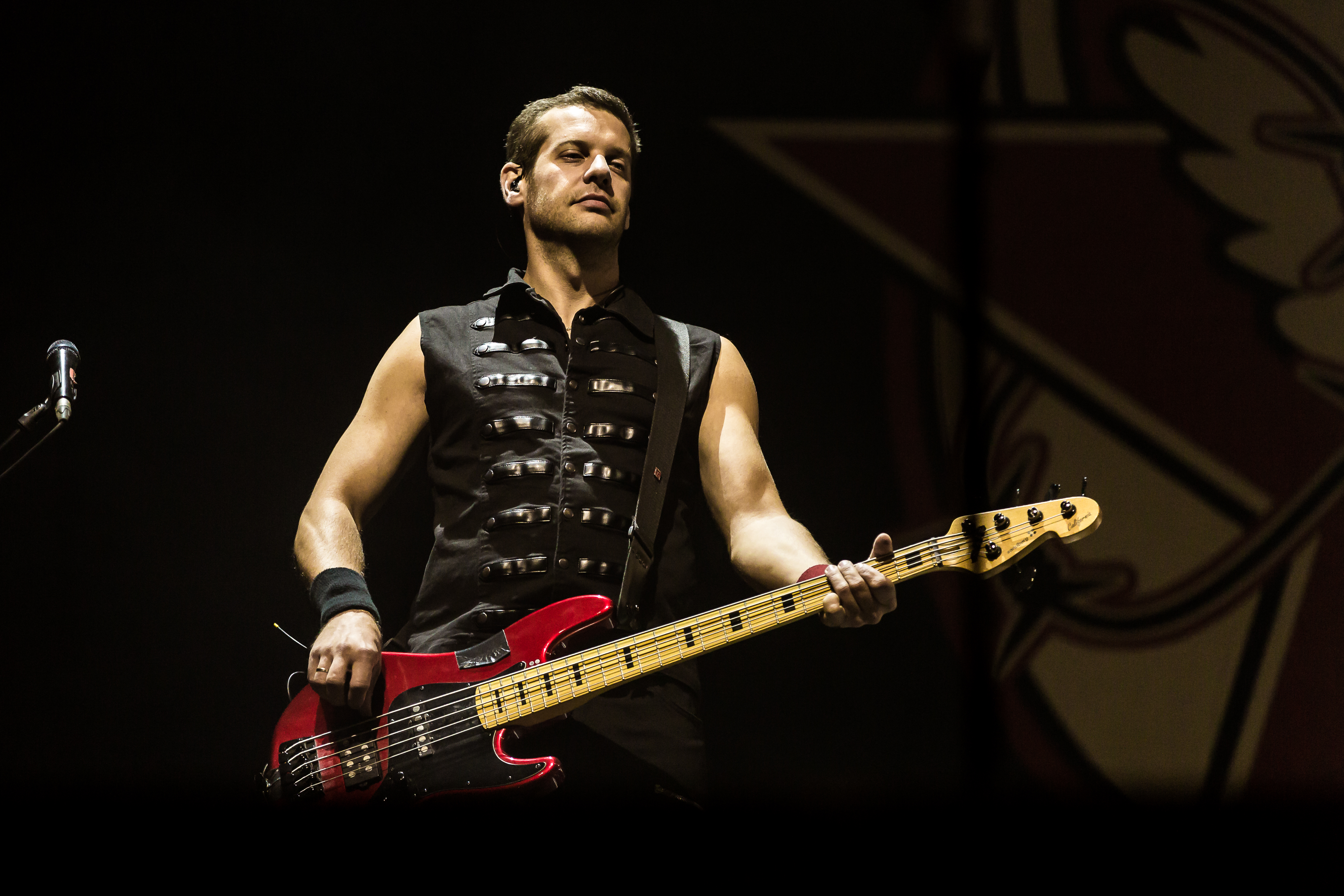
Bassist Dimitrij Miller

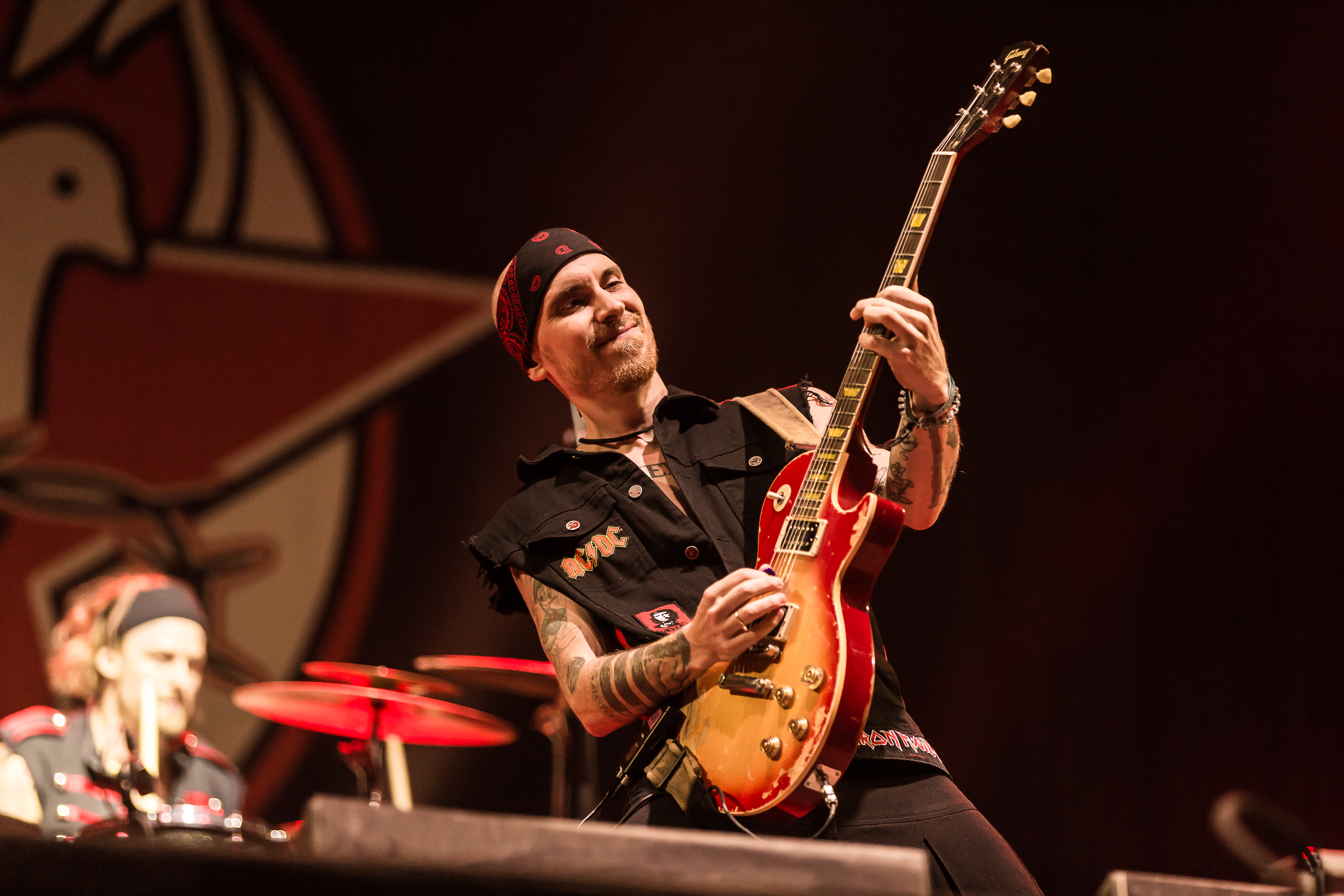
Guitarist Engel Mayr

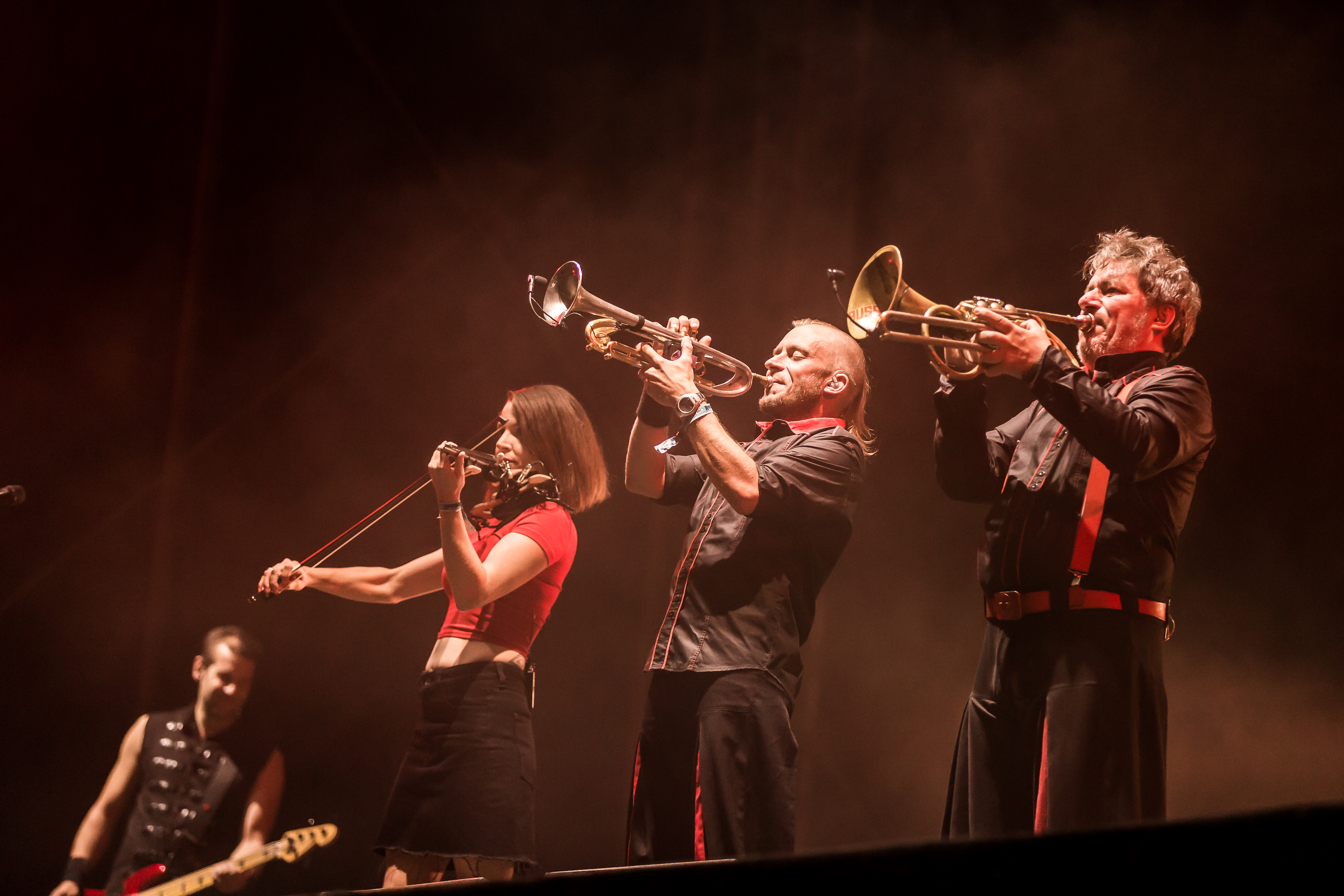
Violinist Lea-Sophie Fischer; Trumpeter Rainer Gutternigg and Potete player Hans-Georg Gutternigg

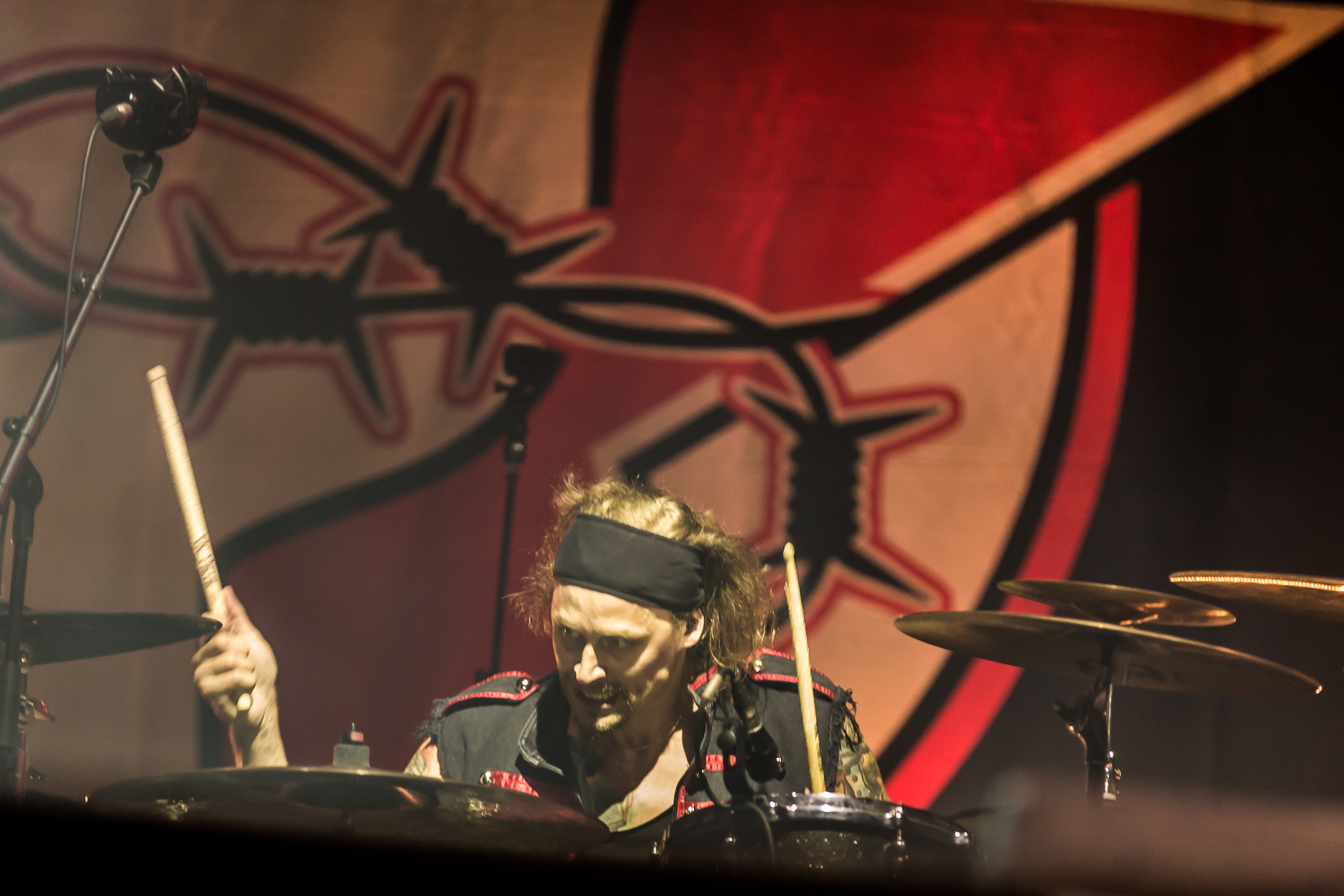
Drummer Mario Stübler

Final lineup

- Georgij Makazaria – vocals
- Dimitrij Miller – bass
- Engel Mayr – guitar
- Lea-Sophie Fischer - violin
- Rainer Gutternigg – trumpet
- H-G. Gutternigg – potete
- Mario Stübler – drums

Former members

- Titus Vadon – drums
- Zebo Adam – guitar
- Antonia-Alexa Georgiew – violin
- Ulrike Müllner – violin

== Discography ==
=== Albums ===
Year	Title	Austrian charts peak position
2008	Kasatchok Superstar	15
2010	Russian Voodoo	36
2013	Energia!	47
2015	Peace, Love & Russian Roll	42
2017	Kosmopoliturbo	27
2019	No One Is Illegal	48
2023	Turbo Polka Party	7

=== EPs ===
- Dawai, Dawai (2006)
- Barada (2013)
- No Borders (2022)
- Shapka (2023)
- Paschli (2023)

=== Singles ===
- "Dope Shit" (2007)
- "More" (2008)
- "Kasatchok Superstar the Song" (2009)
- "Hammer Drive" (Download-only) (2010)
- "Rock'n'Roll Today" (2015)
- "Hey Road" (2017)
- "Alive" (2017)
- "Druschba (You're Not Alone)" (2019)
- "Russki Style" (2021)
- "Last Christmas" (2021)

== See also ==
- Red Elvises
