= Blackbriar (band) =

Dutch alternative metal/gothic rock band

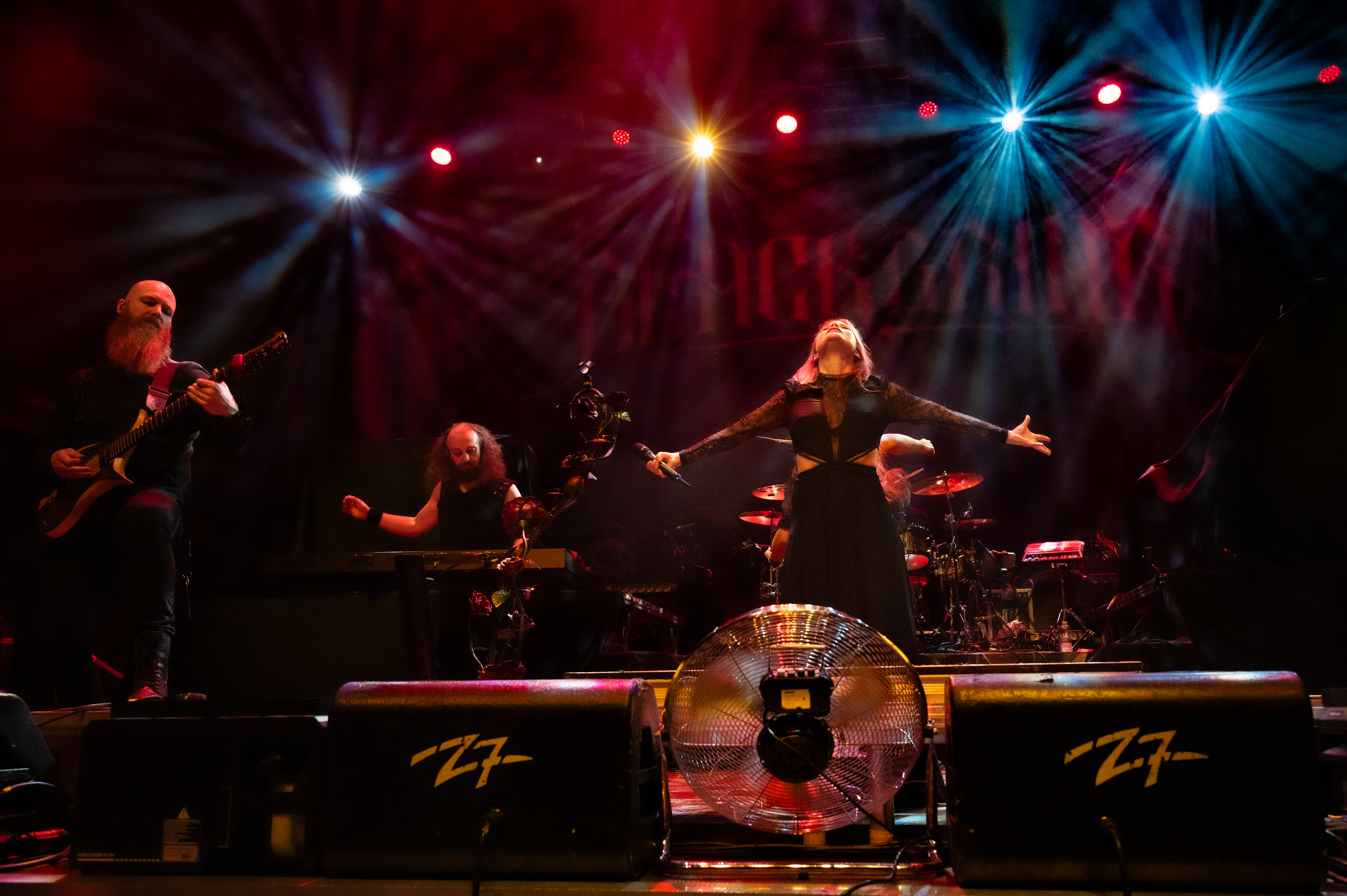
- Blackbriar performing in 2024

Background information
- Origin: Assen, Netherlands
- Genres: Alternative metal, gothic metal, symphonic metal
- Years active: 2012–present
- Label: Nuclear Blast
- Members: Zora Cock; René Boxem; Bart Winters; Robin Koezen; Ruben Wijga
- Past members: René Sempel; Frank Akkerman; Siebe Sol Sijpkens
- Website: blackbriarmusic.com

Blackbriar is a Dutch alternative metal band from Assen. They have released three albums, four EPs, six singles, twelve official music videos, one official lyric video and four acoustic live videos.

In October 2019, Blackbriar joined Epica as official support during their Design Your Universe 10th Anniversary Tour.

In November 2019, Blackbriar was invited to play the aftershow for Halestorm and In This Moment at the AFAS Live in Amsterdam, the Netherlands. The band signed a contract with Nuclear Blast in November 2022.

The band shot the music video for Dianne van Giersbergen's first solo single "After the Storm", which was released on 14 February 2023.

== Reception ==
The band's debut album The Cause of Shipwreck was released in April 2021 and received positive reviews. Metal Hammer Germany compared singer Zora Cock's style to Kate Bush in "Wuthering Heights" and Amy Lee in "My Immortal". The Finnish Tuonela Magazine wrote that the band distinguished itself by mixing "a healthy dose of Gothic imagery into their brand of symphonic metal" and called The Cause of Shipwreck "an album that not only significantly expands their sound but also solidifies it". Fellow rock musician Liselotte Hegt wrote that "Zora is almost like a siren, luring you into dark romantic scenarios, twisted fairy tales and ghostlike sceneries", and found that the orchestral elements on the album were present but not overpowering.

== Band members ==
Current

- Zora Cock – vocals (2012–present)
- René Boxem – drums (2012–present)
- Bart Winters – lead guitar (2012–present)
- Robin Koezen – rhythm guitar (2016–present)
- Ruben Wijga – keyboards (2019–present)

Former

- René Sempel – rhythm guitar (2012–2016)
- Frank Akkerman – bass (2012–2022)
- Siebe Sol Sijpkens – bass (2022–2025, live 2021)

== Discography ==
Studio albums

- The Cause of Shipwreck (2021)
- A Dark Euphony (2023)
- A Thousand Little Deaths (2025)

EPs

- Fractured Fairytales (2017)
- We'd Rather Burn (2018)
- Our Mortal Remains (2019)
- Our Long Cursed Sleep (2026)

Singles

- "Ready to Kill" (2014)
- "Until Eternity" (2015)
- "Preserved Roses" (2017)
- "Snow White and Rose Red" (2019)
- "Mortal Remains" (2019)
- "The Séance" (2021)
- "Deadly Diminuendo" (2021)
- "Selkie" (2021)
- "Walking Over My Grave" (2021)
- "Fairy of the Bog" (2021)
- "Crimson Faces" (2022)
- "My Soul's Demise" (2023)
- "Cicada" (2023)
- "Forever and a Day" (2023)
- "Spirit of Forgetfulness" (2023)
- "Moonflower" (2024)
- "Floriography" (2024)
- "I Buried Us" (2025)
- "The Fossilized Widow" (2025)
- "Harpy" (2025)
- "A Last Sigh of Bliss" (2025)
- "Bluebeard's Chamber" (2025)
- "A Thousand Anemones" (2026)
- "A Long Cursed Sleep" (2026)

== Videography ==
- "Ready to Kill" Directed by Michel Berendsen
- "Until Eternity" Directed by Joshua Maldonado
- "I'd Rather Burn" Directed by Blackbriar
- "Arms of the Ocean" Directed by Joshua Maldonado
- "Snow White and Rose Red"
- "Mortal Remains"
- "Beautiful Delirium"
- "The Séance" Directed by Joshua Maldonado
- "Selkie"
- "Walking Over My Grave" Directed by Joshua Maldonado
- "Weakness and Lust" Directed by Blackbriar
- "You're Haunting Me"
- "Fairy of the Bog" Directed by Joshua Maldonado
- "Crimson Faces" Directed by Joshua Maldonado
- "My Soul's Demise" Directed by Joshua Maldonado
- "Cicada" Directed by Blackbriar
- "Spirit of Forgetfulness" Directed by blksm media
- "Moonflower" Directed by Cinebuds
- "Floriography" Directed by Cinebuds
- "I Buried Us" Directed by Cinebuds
