= Mental Cruelty =

German deathcore band

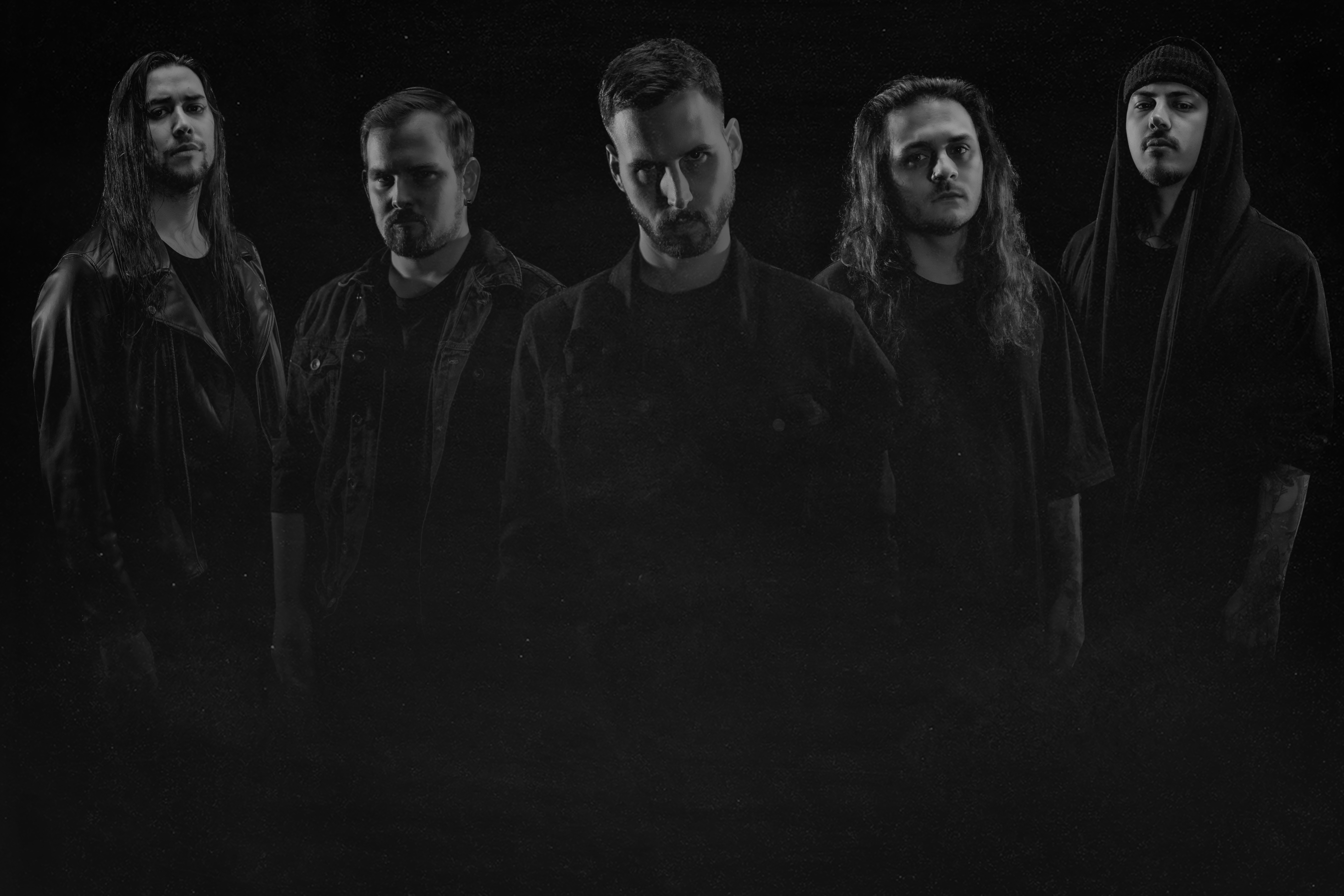
- Mental Cruelty in early 2023. From left: Nahuel Lozano, Danny Straßer (former), Lukas Nicolai, Marvin Kessler and Viktor Dick (former)

Background information
- Origin: Karlsruhe, Baden-Württemberg, Germany
- Genres: Deathcore; symphonic black metal; blackened death metal
- Years active: 2014–present
- Labels: Century Media; Unique Leader; Rising Nemesis
- Members: Lukas Nicolai; Nahuel Lozano; Marvin Kessler; Jonathan Koltun
- Past members: Julian Oberst; Alex Reichel; Alex Vespremi; Dennis Paßmann; Kevin Popescu; Lucca Schmerler; Danny Straßer; Viktor Dick
- Website: mentalcrueltyofficial.com

Mental Cruelty is a German deathcore band formed in 2014 in Karlsruhe, Baden-Württemberg. The band's lineup currently consists of vocalist Lukas Nicolai, guitarists Marvin Kessler and Nahuel Lozano and drummer Jonathan Koltun. The band has released five studio albums with their latest being Echoes of a Forlorn Land, released on 23 October 2026 through Century Media Records. They have also released one EP and one demo. Mental Cruelty are currently signed to Century Media Records.

== History ==
The band released their debut demo Sickening World in 2015. This was followed by the release of their EP Pereat Mundus, released on 1 November 2016. After signing with Rising Nemesis Records, their debut album Purgatorium was released in January 2018. In 2019, Mental Cruelty signed a record deal with the US metal label Unique Leader Records and released their second album, Inferis on 10 May 2019. This album was produced by Sky van Hoff. In March 2021, the band released the single "Ultima Hypocrita" featuring Japanese guitarist Yo Onityan, along with the announcement of their third full-length album, A Hill to Die Upon, which was released On 28 May 2021.

On 2 March 2022, it was announced that Mental Cruelty had signed with Century Media Records. However, on 28 March 2022 the band announced that they had parted ways with singer Lucca Schmerler after several anonymous allegations of sexual abuse against him were published on Instagram. Schmerler denied the allegations and stated that he, his friends and family had been threatened since the anonymous allegations.

On 24 February 2023, the band announced Lukas Nicolai from Sun Eater as their new vocalist and released two new singles titled "Zwielicht/Symphony of a Dying Star". On 14 April 2023, the band announced their fourth studio album, Zwielicht, which was released on 23 June 2023. Alongside the announcement, they released the single "Forgotten Kings". The third single titled "Nordlys" was released on 25 May 2023. On 17 January 2024, a deathcore band from Las Vegas named Ov Sulfur released a single titled "Hivemind" which featured guest vocals from Lukas Nicolai. In October 2024, the band released an orchestral and instrumental version of the track "Mortal Shells" from the Zwielicht album, also announcing a deluxe version of the album would be released in December. This would then be followed by an instrumental and piano reimagined version of the track "Symphony Of A Dying Star".

On 14 August 2026, the band announced their fifth studio album, Echoes of a Forlorn Land, which was released on 23 October 2026. Alongside the announcement, they released the single "Raise the Raven Banner".

== Musical style and influences ==
Mental Cruelty is generally considered a deathcore band, as well as symphonic black metal and blackened death metal.

== Band members ==
=== Current ===
- Lukas Nicolai – vocals (2023–present)
- Nahuel Lozano – guitar (2020–present)
- Marvin Kessler – guitar (2014–present)
- Jonathan Koltun – drums (2025–present)

=== Former ===
- Julian Oberst – bass (2014–2016)
- Alex Reichel – guitar (2014–2016)
- Alex Vespremi – drums (2016)
- Kevin Popescu – drums (2016–2019)
- Dennis Paßmann – guitar (2016–2020)
- Lucca Schmerler – vocals (2014–2022)
- Danny Straßer – drums (2020–2025)
- Viktor Dick – bass (2016–2026)

=== Live ===
- Marco Bayati – guitar (2019)
- Danny Joe Hofmann – drums (2019)
- KC Brand – drums (2024–present)

== Discography ==
=== Albums ===
- Purgatorium (2018)
- Inferis (2019)
- A Hill to Die Upon (2021)
- Zwielicht (2023)
- Echoes of a Forlorn Land (2026)

=== Demos/EPs ===
- Sickening World (2015)
- Pereat Mundus (2016)
