= Smoulder (band) =

Canadian epic doom metal band

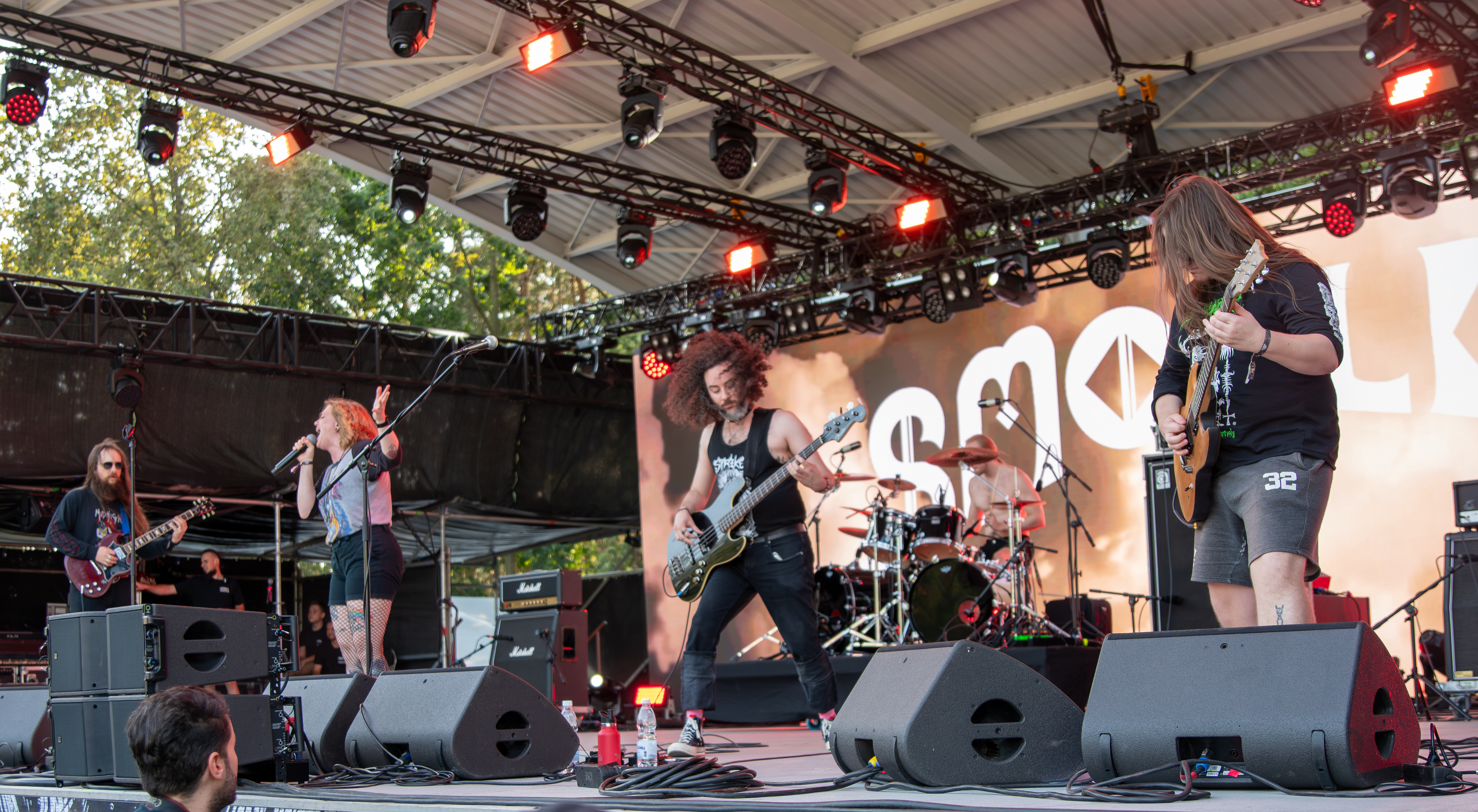
- Smoulder in concert (2024)

Background information
- Origin: Toronto, Ontario, Canada
- Genres: Power metal; epic doom metal
- Years active: 2013–present
- Label: Cruz del Sur Music
- Members: Sarah Ann Kitteringham; Kevin Hester; Colin Wolf; Shon Vincent; Adam Blake

Smoulder is a Canadian epic doom metal/power metal band based in Toronto, Canada. Their lyrics derive inspiration from high fantasy novels and pulp fantasy fiction.

== History ==
Smoulder was founded in 2013, and released the demo The Sword Woman in 2018. After selling out a 150 run of cassettes, their record label pressed a 300 run of 7-inch vinyl, which also sold out. After the demo, Smoulder was asked to play Hammer of Doom festival in Germany, where they were signed to Cruz del Sur Records.

Vocalist Sarah Ann Kitteringham and guitarist Shon Vincent moved to Finland in 2022.

== Music ==
Smoulder's lyrics and album artwork are inspired by high fantasy and the sword and sorcery subgenre in particular, with author Michael Moorcock's Eternal Champion mythos being the source material for much of their music, and Moorcock himself providing spoken-word guest vocals on their song "Victims of Fate". Their self-described influences include Manilla Road, Tales of Medusa, Solitude Aeternus, Fates Warning, and early Blind Guardian, and their sound has also been compared to foundational doom metal band Candlemass by critics.

Their sophomore album Violent Creed of Vengeance was inspired by the COVID-19 pandemics' negative influence on society, many being isolated and made more bitter and cruel by the experience with little accountability, as well as the continuation of misogyny and rape culture. The album's theme, exemplified on the title track, is revenge on rapists and misogynists.

== Discography ==
=== Albums ===
- Times of Obscene Evil and Wild Daring (Cruz Del Sur, 2019)
- Violent Creed of Vengeance (Cruz Del Sur, 2023)
- Witch Wife in an Alien World (Cruz Del Sur, 2026)

==== EPs ====
- The Sword Woman (2018)
- Dream Quest Ends (2020)
