= Worm Shepherd =

American blackened deathcore band

- Origin: Brockton, Massachusetts, United States
- Genres: Blackened deathcore; symphonic deathcore; blackened death metal
- Years active: 2020–present
- Label: Unique Leader Records
- Members: Leo McClain; Tre Purdue; Thomas O'Malley; Harry Tadayon; Ian Smith
- Past members: Ryan Ibarra; Brandon Cooper; Devin Duarte; The Orc King

Worm Shepherd is an American deathcore band from Brockton, Massachusetts, formed in 2020. The band has released three studio albums and two EPs.

== History ==
The band released their debut album In The Wake Ov Sòl independently on December 25, 2020, before getting signed to Unique Leader Records and re-releasing the album via the label on June 4, 2021, receiving positive feedback. Vocalist Devin Duarte stated that he wrote the album when he was "at my emotional lowest and brought me back to the darkest places in my life. I wanted to encapsulate the hopelessness people feel with these words, so that it can have a uniting effect. I wrote all the lyrics at the location where I made an attempt on my life, and I feel that it brought me even closer to the message." Worm Shepherd and Recoil in Horror guest appeared in the song "This is Helloween" by Nitheful.

The band released their second album Ritual Hymns on January 14, 2022. Singles and music videos were released for the songs "Ov Sword and Nail", "Chalice Ov Rebirth", "The River Ov Knives", and "A Bird in the Dusk". In July and August, they supported The Last Ten Seconds of Life in that band's North American tour, alongside Entheos. In October, Worm Shepherd supported Sanguisugabogg in that band's North American tour, alongside VCTMS and Scumfuck. Devin Duarte has guest appeared in the song "Reaper of Dreams" by Oracle Spectre.

On July 26, 2023, Worm Shepherd announced a new EP, The Sleeping Sun, released on August 18, 2023, receiving positive feedback. Devin Duarte has guest appeared in the songs "Somber" by Old Wharf and "The Order of the Gash" by Alastor's Gash. After drastically changing the lineup following the release of their 2024 album Hunger, Worm Shepherd released their EP Dawn of the Iconoclast on February 20, 2026.

== Musical style ==
Worm Shepherd and its material have been described as blackened deathcore, deathcore, symphonic deathcore, blackened death metal, black metal, technical death metal, symphonic black metal, extreme metal, death metal, doom metal, and atmospheric black metal.

== Band members ==
Current

- Tre Purdue – guitars (2020–present)
- Leo McClain – drums (2020–2022, 2025–present)
- Thomas O'Malley – bass (2024–present)
- Harry Tadayon – guitars (2024–present)
- Ian Smith – vocals (2025–present)

Former

- Ryan Ibarra – bass, guitars (2020–2022)
- Brandon Cooper – guitars (2020–2023)
- Devin Duarte – vocals (2020–2024)
- The Orc King – vocals (2024)

Live

- Damon Vojtkofsky – drums (2022–2023)
- Hunter Spader – bass (2022)

== Discography ==
Studio Albums

- In the Wake ov Sòl (2020)
- Ritual Hymns (2022)
- Hunger (2024)

EPs

- The Sleeping Sun (2023)
- Dawn of the Iconoclast (2026)

Singles

- Accused (2020)
- Wretchedness upon the Gates (2020)
- The Frozen Lake (Re-Recorded) (2020)
- Ov Sword and Nail (2021)
- Ritual Hymns (2021)
- Chalice ov Rebirth (2021)
- Eyeless (Slipknot cover) (2021)
- The River ov Knifes (2021)
- The Frozen Lake, Pt. II (The Ruined) (2023)
- The Dying Heavens (2023)
- He Who Breathes Fire (2024)
- The Anguished Throne (2024)
- Whispers of a Buried Land (2026)
