= Zwielicht (album) =

Studio album by Mental Cruelty
- Released: June 23, 2023
- Genres: Deathcore; blackened death metal; symphonic black metal
- Length: 48:46
- Label: Century Media
- Producer: Josh Schroeder

Mental Cruelty chronology
A Hill to Die Upon (2021)	Zwielicht (2023)	Echoes of a Forlorn Land (2026)

Singles from Zwielicht
- 1. "Zwielicht/Symphony of a Dying Star" Released: February 24, 2023; 2. "Forgotten Kings" Released: April 14, 2023; 3. "Nordlys" Released: May 25, 2023

Professional ratings
Review scores
Source	Rating
Boolin Tunes	6/10
Distorted Sound	8/10

Zwielicht (German for twilight) is the fourth studio album by German deathcore band Mental Cruelty. It was released on June 23, 2023, through Century Media Records, it is the band's first album to be released through the label. It is the band's first album to feature vocalist Lukas Nicolai, who replaced Lucca Schmerler in 2023 after he got fired from the band in 2022 after several allegations of sexual misconduct were made against his name, and their last album with bassist Viktor Dick and drummer Danny Straßer. A deluxe edition of the album was released on December 13, 2024. It includes instrumental, orchestral, and piano versions of many of the tracks from the album.

== Lyrical themes and composition ==
The band has stated that the track "Zwielicht" (which serves as an intro) is a poem written in German by guitarist Marvin Kessler and is about how depression can fully take over your life. The poem is written from a very personal perspective and proceeding through the hardest and darkest stages of life. The song is heavily inspired by classic Nordic folk songs and was recorded with ancient instruments. "Symphony Of A Dying Star" serves as the continuation of "Zwielicht" both musically and lyrically, in "Symphony Of A Dying Star", it accompanies a man through his journey through a winter landscape, all life around him seems to be trapped in hibernation and eternal ice while a surreal feeling of deafness creeps up on him. The winter itself serves as a metaphor for loneliness.

The song "Forgotten Kings" is inspired by the story of the Lost Sinner from Dark Souls. It tells the story of a man that is shackled to a mountain summit. He stands for the feeling of being trapped and isolated. The song "Nordlys" is about ancient sagas of the northern lights through the eyes of Vikings and Norwegian tribes. Their view interprets the lights in the sky in different ways, like how we should approach new situations positively, remembering fear often lies in our heads.

== Track listing ==
All tracks are written by Lukas Nicolai, Nahuel Lozano and Marvin Kessler.

Zwielicht track listing
No.	Title	Length
1.	"Midtvinter"	1:43
2.	"Obsessis a Daemonio"	5:07
3.	"Forgotten Kings"	5:57
4.	"Pest"	5:52
5.	"Nordlys"	5:19
6.	"Mortal Shells"	6:11
7.	"Zwielicht"	1:33
8.	"Symphony of a Dying Star"	4:11
9.	"The Arrogance of Agony"	5:22
10.	"A Tale of Salt and Light"	7:31
Total length:		48:46

Deluxe edition
No.	Title	Length
1.	"Mortal Shells (Orchestral Version)"	4:30
2.	"Symphony of a Dying Star (feat. Misstiq) [Piano Version]"	4:26

Deluxe edition
No.	Title	Length
1.	"Obsessio a Daemonio (Instrumental)"	5:07
2.	"Forgotten Kings (Instrumental)"	5:56
3.	"Pest (Instrumental)"	5:52
4.	"Nordlys (Instrumental)"	5:19
5.	"Mortal Shells (Instrumental)"	6:11
6.	"Zwielicht (Instrumental)"	1:33
7.	"Symphony of a Dying Star (Instrumental)"	4:11
8.	"The Arrogance of Agony (Instrumental)"	5:22
9.	"A Tale of Salt and Light (Instrumental)"	7:31

== Personnel ==
Mental Cruelty

- Lukas Nicolai – vocals, songwriting
- Marvin Kessler – guitar, songwriting
- Nahuel Lozano – guitar, songwriting
- Viktor Dick – bass
- Danny Straßer – drums

Additional musicians

- Misstiq – piano on "Symphony of a Dying Star [Piano Version]"

Other personnel

- Josh Schroeder – production, mixing, mastering
- Mariusz Lewandowski – cover art
