= 2022 in heavy metal music =

This is a timeline documenting the events of heavy metal in the year 2022.

== Bands formed ==
- Angus McSix
- Elegant Weapons
- Ibaraki

== Bands disbanded ==
- Battlecross (indefinite hiatus)
- Blessthefall
- Every Time I Die
- Mary's Blood (hiatus)
- Necronomidol (hiatus)
- Nuclear Assault
- Okilly Dokilly
- Ratt
- The Sword
- Tristania
- Twelve Foot Ninja (indefinite hiatus)

== Bands reformed ==
- A Skylit Drive
- Becoming the Archetype
- Biohazard
- Botch
- Coal Chamber
- Divine Heresy
- Gates of Ishtar
- God Forbid
- Northern Kings
- Pantera
- Prayer for Cleansing (one-off show)
- Symphony in Peril
- Watchtower
- With Blood Comes Cleansing
- Woe, Is Me
- Zero Hour

== Deaths ==
- January 4 – Andrzej Nowak, guitarist of TSA, died from a long-term illness at the age of 62.
- January 10 – Burke Shelley, vocalist and bassist of Budgie, died from undisclosed reasons at the age of 71.
- January 10 – Gérard Drouot, promoter of numerous rock and metal bands including Deep Purple and Alice Cooper, died from leukemia at the age of 69.
- January 20 – Michael Lee Aday, singer and actor better known as Meat Loaf, died from COVID-19 complications at the age of 74.
- January 25 – Fredrik Johansson, former guitarist of Dark Tranquillity, died from cancer at the age of 47.
- January 26 – Kit Woolven, producer and engineer for albums by numerous rock and metal bands including Thin Lizzy, UFO, Cradle of Filth, Tony Iommi, Cathedral, and Steelheart, died from undisclosed reasons at the age of 71.
- February 1 – Jon Zazula, co-founder of Megaforce Records, died from complications of chronic inflammatory demyelinating polyneuropathy, chronic obstructive pulmonary disease, and osteopenia at the age of 69.
- February 6 – Bruce Greig, former guitarist of Misery Index and Dying Fetus, died from undisclosed reasons at the age of 54.
- February 10 – Roman Kostrzewski, vocalist of Kat & Roman Kostrzewski and former vocalist of Kat, died from cancer at the age of 61.
- March 8 – Joe Moore, former drummer of Blood Feast, died from undisclosed reason at the age of 55.
- March 22 – Jayson Holmes, former vocalist and guitarist of Eso-Charis and former vocalist of The Handshake Murders, died from undisclosed reasons at the age of 42.
- March 24 – Didier Séverin, former vocalist of Knut, died from undisclosed reasons.
- March 25 – Taylor Hawkins, former session drummer of Coheed and Cambria, died from undisclosed reasons at the age of 50.
- April 5 – Adam Whited, former bassist of King Conquer, died from undisclosed reasons.
- April 12 – Ronnie Deo, former bassist of Incantation, died from undisclosed reasons at the age of 47.
- April 26 – Randy Rand, bassist of Autograph, died from undisclosed reasons.
- April 30 – Gabe Serbian, drummer of The Locust and Head Wound City, former drummer and guitarist of Cattle Decapitation and former vocalist of Dead Cross, died from undisclosed reasons at the age of 44.
- May 1 – Ric Parnell (also known as Mick Shrimpton), former drummer of Spinal Tap, died from undisclosed reasons at the age of 70.
- May 4 – Howie Pyro, former bassist of Danzig, died from complications due to COVID-related pneumonia at the age of 61.
- May 11 – Trevor Strnad, vocalist of The Black Dahlia Murder committed Suicide at the age of 41.
- May 24 – Guillaume Bideau, former vocalist of Mnemic and Scarve, died from undisclosed reasons at the age of 44.
- May 30 – Henrik "Hempo" Hildén, former drummer of John Norum, Don Dokken and Glenn Hughes, died from undisclosed reasons at the age of 69.
- May 30 – Juha Tapio "Agathon" Hintikka, former drummer of Thy Serpent and founding member, vocalist, multi-instrumentalist, producer, and cover artist of Gloomy Grim, died from brain tumor complications at the age of 53.
- June 3 – Ken Kelly, painter and cover artist for albums by numerous bands, including Manowar, Kiss, and Rainbow, died from undisclosed reasons at the age of 76.
- June 3 – Lohy Fabiano, vocalist and bassist of Rebaelliun, died from cardio-respiratory arrest at the age of 44.
- June 5 – Alec John Such, former bassist of Bon Jovi, died from undisclosed reasons at the age of 70.
- June 19 – Brett Tuggle, former keyboardist of David Lee Roth, died from cancer at the age of 70.
- June 19 – Uwe "Ahäthoor" Christoffers, former guitarist of Sodom, died from undisclosed reasons.
- July 1 – Andrew LaBarre, former vocalist and guitarist of Impaled and Ghoul, died from ALS at the age of 43.
- July 5 – Manny Charlton, founding member and former guitarist of Nazareth, died from undisclosed reasons at the age of 80.
- July 11 – Olav Berland, founding member, guitarist, and drummer of Forgotten Woods, died from an unspecified illness at the age of 45.
- July 24 – Bob Heathcote, former bassist of Suicidal Tendencies, died from injuries sustained in a motorcycle accident at the age of 58.
- July 27 – Kaleb Luebchow, drummer of War of Ages, died from undisclosed reasons.
- July 29 – Michael Bloodgood, bassist of Bloodgood, died from a hemorrhagic stroke.
- August 3 – Nicky Moore, former vocalist of Samson, died from Parkinson's disease at the age of 75.
- August 15 – Steve Grimmett, vocalist of Grim Reaper and former vocalist of Onslaught, died from undisclosed reasons at the age of 62.
- August 19 – Ted Kirkpatrick, drummer of Tourniquet, died from idiopathic pulmonary fibrosis at the age of 62.
- August 22 – Stuart Anstis, former guitarist of Cradle of Filth, died from undisclosed reasons at the age of 48.
- September 7 – Dave Sherman, vocalist of Earthride and former bassist of Spirit Caravan and The Obsessed, died from undisclosed reasons at the age of 55.
- September 14 – David Andersson, guitarist of Soilwork, died from undisclosed reasons at the age of 47.
- October 24 – Paul Stoddard, vocalist of Diecast, died from undisclosed reasons.
- November 4 – Andy Kaina, vocalist of Messiah, died from cardiac arrest at the age of 53.
- November 6 – Daniel Fawcett, former guitarist of Helix, died from undisclosed reasons at the age of 52.
- November 8 – Dan McCafferty, former vocalist of Nazareth, died from undisclosed reasons at the age of 76.
- November 28 – Mike Clement, guitar tech for Tony Iommi and Motörhead, died from undisclosed reasons.
- December 8 – Stian "Ben Hellion" Andreassen, former guitarist of Nocturnal Breed, died by suicide.
- December 30 – Bob Nalbandian, heavy metal journalist, historian, documentarian, and editor who contributed to hard rock and heavy metal magazines Creem, Music Connection, Hit Parader and BAM, died from mantle cell lymphoma.

== Events ==
- After two postponements, in 2020 and 2021, due to the COVID-19 pandemic, heavy metal-related festivals such as Download, Wacken Open Air, Sweden Rock Festival and Hellfest returned this year.
- On January 10, Judas Priest announced the removal of Andy Sneap as a live member and that the band would continue as a four-piece. The decision was reversed less than a week later after fan backlash.
- On January 21, Testament announced the band was amicably parting ways with longtime drummer Gene Hoglan for the second time. Hoglan's previous stint with the band was between 1996 and 1997. About two months later, he was replaced by Dave Lombardo, who was previously a member of Testament between 1998 and 1999.
- On February 23, Tom Smith, guitarist of The Acacia Strain, announced that he will be leaving the band in early March following a run of shows ending in Albany, New York.
- On March 1, vocalist John Robert Centorrino, bassist Mike Menocker, and drummer Steven Sanchez departed The Last Ten Seconds of Life.
- On March 23, Skid Row announced the departure of lead singer ZP Theart, and that he was being replaced by former H.E.A.T vocalist Erik Grönwall.
- On May 3, Draconian announced the departure of singer Heike Langhans and the return of Lisa Johansson on vocals, as well as the addition of Niklas Nord on guitars.
- On May 4, Cradle of Filth announced the departures of guitarist Rich Shaw and keyboardist Anabelle Iratni.
- On May 6, Amen, co-founder and longtime guitarist of Lordi, announced his departure from the band.
- On May 16, longtime bassist and clean vocalist Josh Gilbert announced his departure from As I Lay Dying. Nearly a week later, on May 22, it was announced that Josh would be filling in, in place of Bill Crook, who had just left Spiritbox, for their 2022 shows. A month later, As I Lay Dying announced they had split with co-founder and longtime drummer Jordan Mancino.
- In July, it was announced Phil Anselmo and Rex Brown would be reuniting Pantera and headlining a number of major festivals across North America and Europe starting later in the year in December. Filling in for the late Dimebag Darrell and Vinnie Paul are Zakk Wylde and Charlie Benante, respectively.
- In July, longtime Deep Purple guitarist Steve Morse announced his departure from the band due to family reasons. Later in September, touring guitarist Simon McBride (formerly of Sweet Savage) was announced as a permanent member.
- On August 21, Nightwish announced the addition of bassist Jukka Koskinen as an official member. Koskinen was previously the band's session member for the Human. :II: Nature. World Tour, after the departure of longtime bassist Marko Hietala in January 2021.
- In August, Neurosis guitarist and founding member Scott Kelly announced his retirement from music, admitting in a social media post that he has "engaged in the emotional, financial, verbal and physical abuse" of his wife and children. The band responded with a statement that they stopped working with Scott in 2019 after learning about his behavior, but not sharing the information out of respect for his wife's request for privacy.
- In August, former Murderdolls members feud over the copyright after former guitarist Acey Slade bought it.
- On October 26, Mötley Crüe co-founder and lead guitarist Mick Mars announced his retirement from touring with the band due to ongoing health problems. The band subsequently announced John 5 (formerly of Marilyn Manson and Rob Zombie) as the live guitarist.
- On November 5, Judas Priest were inducted into the Rock and Roll Hall of Fame, playing a 3 song set alongside former members K. K. Downing and Les Binks.

== Albums released ==
=== January ===
Day	Artist	Album
7	Atrocity	Unspoken Names (Demo 1991) (EP)
7	Infected Rain	Ecdysis
7	Schwarzer Engel	Sieben
14	Enterprise Earth	The Chosen
14	Fit for an Autopsy	Oh What the Future Holds
14	Ilium	Quantum Evolution Event (EP)
14	Shadow of Intent	Elegy
14	Skillet	Dominion
14	Tony Martin	Thorns
14	Underoath	Voyeurist
14	Worm Shepherd	Ritual Hymns
21	Ashes of Ares	Emperors and Fools
21	Asking Alexandria	Never Gonna Learn (EP)
21	Battle Beast	Circus of Doom
21	Boris	W
21	Confess	Revenge at All Costs
21	Giant	Shifting Time
21	Iced Earth	A Narrative Soundscape
21	Kissin' Dynamite	Not the End of the Road
21	Sonata Arctica	Acoustic Adventures – Volume One
21	Tokyo Blade	Fury
28	Celeste	Assassine(s)
28	Cloakroom	Dissolution Wave
28	Dawn of Solace	Flames of Perdition
28	Emerald Sun	Kingdom of Gods
28	Krallice	Crystalline Exhaustion
28	Lana Lane	Neptune Blue
28	The Last Ten Seconds of Life	The Last Ten Seconds of Life
28	Lawnmower Deth	Blunt Cutters
28	Praying Mantis	Katharsis
28	The Quill	Live, New, Borrowed, Blue (compilation album)
28	Steve Vai	Inviolate

=== February ===
Day	Artist	Album
3	Kälad	Inner Tide (single)
4	Abysmal Dawn	Nightmare Frontier (EP)
4	Bevar Sea	The Timeless Zone
4	Hed PE	Califas Worldwide
4	Korn	Requiem
4	Mystic Circle	Mystic Circle
4	Persefone	Metanoia
4	Rolo Tomassi	Where Myth Becomes Memory
4	Saxon	Carpe Diem
4	Venom Prison	Erebos
11	Amorphis	Halo
11	Author & Punisher	Krüller
11	Cult of Luna	The Long Road North
11	Girish and The Chronicles	Hail to the Heroes
11	Napalm Death	Resentment Is Always Seismic – A Final Throw of Throes (mini-album)
11	Once Human	Scar Weaver
11	The Silent Wedding	Ego Path
11	Slash feat. Myles Kennedy & the Conspirators	4
11	Tersivel	To the Orphic Void
11	Voivod	Synchro Anarchy
11	Zeal & Ardor	Zeal & Ardor
18	Annihilator	Metal II
18	Bloodywood	Rakshak
18	Dagoba	By Night
18	Esprit D'Air	Oceans
18	Immolation	Acts of God (Immolation album)
18	Matt Pike	Pike vs. the Automaton
18	Nightrage	Abyss Rising
18	Spirits of Fire	Embrace the Unknown
18	Star One	Revel in Time
25	Allegaeon	Damnum
25	Bad Omens	The Death of Peace of Mind
25	Blood Incantation	Timewave Zero
25	Corey Taylor	CMFB ...Sides (covers album)
25	Diablo	When All the Rivers Are Silent
25	Eight Bells	Legacy of Ruin
25	George "Corpsegrinder" Fisher	Corpsegrinder
25	Guns N' Roses	Hard Skool (EP)
25	HammerFall	Hammer of Dawn
25	Metalucifer	Heavy Metal Ninja (mini-album)
25	Scorpions	Rock Believer
25	Shape of Despair	Return to the Void
25	Svartsot	Kumbl
25	Tygers of Pan Tang	A New Heartbeat (EP)

=== March ===
Day	Artist	Album
4	10 Years	Deconstructed
4	Crowbar	Zero and Below
4	Eric Wagner	In the Lonely Light of Mourning
4	Flaw	Revival (covers album)
4	Sabaton	The War to End All Wars
4	Sunflower Dead	March of the Leper
4	Ty Tabor	Shades
4	Vein.fm	This World Is Going to Ruin You
4	Vio-lence	Let the World Burn (EP)
4	Warrior Soul	Out on Bail
5	King Gizzard & the Lizard Wizard	Made in Timeland
5	Troglodyte	The Hierarchical Ecological Succession: Welcome to the Food Chain
11	Black Pantera	Ascensão
11	Brandon Boyd	Echoes and Cocoons
11	Claustrofobia	Unleeched
11	Cloven Hoof	Time Assassin
11	Ghost	Impera
11	Grim Reaper	Reaping the Whirlwind (live album)
11	Kiss	Off the Soundboard: Live in Virginia Beach (live album)
11	Love/Hate	HELL, CA
11	New Horizon	Gate of the Gods
11	Shaman's Harvest	Rebelator
11	Wolves at the Gate	Eulogies
12	Dog Fashion Disco	Cult Classic
18	Agathodaimon	The Seven
18	Dark Funeral	We Are the Apocalypse
18	Dawn of Ashes	Scars of the Broken
18	Manigance	Le bal des ombres
18	Ronni Le Tekrø	Bigfoot TV
18	Ronnie Atkins	Make It Count
18	Stabbing Westward	Chasing Ghosts
18	Týr	A Night at the Nordic House (live album)
23	Deathspell Omega	The Long Defeat
25	Abbath	Dread Reaver
25	Animals as Leaders	Parrhesia
25	Architects	For Those That Wish to Exist at Abbey Road (live album)
25	BillyBio	Leaders and Liars
25	Crystal Viper	The Last Axeman (mini-album)
25	Eucharist	I Am the Void
25	Hardcore Superstar	Abrakadabra
25	Killing Joke	Lord of Chaos (EP)
25	Michael Romeo	War of the Worlds, Pt. 2
25	Paleface Swiss	Fear & Dagger
25	Pist.On	Cold World EP (EP)
25	Reckless Love	Turborider

=== April ===
Day	Artist	Album
1	Centinex	The Pestilence (EP)
1	Kublai Khan	Lowest Form of Animal (EP)
1	Lords of the Trident	The Offering
1	Meshuggah	Immutable
1	Nekrogoblikon	The Fundamental Slimes and Humours
1	Satan	Earth Infernal
1	Trick or Treat	Creepy Symphonies
1	Wolf	Shadowland
8	Destruction	Diabolical
8	Hällas	Isle of Wisdom
8	Incite	Wake Up Dead
8	Inglorious	MMXXI Live at the Phoenix (live album)
8	Mors Principium Est	Liberate the Unborn Inhumanity (compilation album)
8	Papa Roach	Ego Trip
8	Terzij de Horde	In One of These, I Am Your Enemy
8	Treat	The Endgame
14	Psychostick	... and Stuff (compilation album)
15	Abated Mass of Flesh	The Existence of Human Suffering
15	Axel Rudi Pell	Lost XXIII
15	Cancer Bats	Psychic Jailbreak
15	Grand Belial's Key	Kohanic Charmers
15	JBO	Planet Pink
15	Månegarm	Ynglingaättens Öde
15	Monuments	In Stasis
15	Nazareth	Surviving the Law
15	Powerglove	Flawless Victory (EP)
15	Ronnie Romero	Raised on Radio (covers album)
15	Semblant	Vermilion Eclipse
15	These Arms Are Snakes	Duct Tape & Shivering Crows (compilation album)
22	Archgoat	All Christianity Ends (EP)
22	Caliban	Dystopia
22	Die Apokalyptischen Reiter	Wilde Kinder
22	King Gizzard & the Lizard Wizard	Omnium Gatherum
22	Märvel	Graces Came with Malice
22	Miseration	Black Miracles and Dark Wonders
22	Northlane	Obsidian
22	Ocean Grove	Up in the Air Forever
22	Primus	Conspiranoid (EP)
22	Skull Fist	Paid in Full
22	Somali Yacht Club	The Space
22	Speckmann Project	Fiends of Emptiness
22	Udo Dirkschneider	My Way (covers album)
23	Charlie Benante	Moving Pitchers (EP)
23	Kirk Hammett	Portals (EP)
23	The Lord	Forest Nocturne
29	Al-Namrood	Worship the Degenerate
29	Crashdïet	Automaton
29	The Gathering	Beautiful Distortion
29	Helms Alee	Keep This Be the Way
29	Heriot	Profound Morality (EP)
29	Rammstein	Zeit
29	Thunder	Dopamine
29	Void of Vision	Chronicles II: Heaven (EP)
29	Vulcano	Stone Orange
29	Watain	The Agony & Ecstasy of Watain

=== May ===
Day	Artist	Album
6	Depressed Mode	Decade of Silence
6	Fozzy	Boombox
6	Halestorm	Back from the Dead
6	Ibaraki	Rashomon
6	Jani Liimatainen	My Father's Son
6	Jeff Scott Soto	Complicated
6	Lord of the Lost	The Heartbeat of the Devil (EP)
6	Puppy	Pure Evil
6	Three Days Grace	Explosions
6	Ufomammut	Fenice
6	Upon a Burning Body	Fury
6	Windwaker	Love Language
13	Demiricous	III: Chaotic Lethal
13	Graham Bonnet Band	Day Out in Nowhere
13	Jungle Rot	A Call to Arms
13	Misery Index	Complete Control
13	Primitive Man	Insurmountable (EP)
13	Visions of Atlantis	Pirates
13	Zero Hour	Agenda 21
18	Novelbright	Assort
20	Anvil	Impact Is Imminent
20	Blut Aus Nord	Disharmonium – Undreamable Abysses
20	Cave In	Heavy Pendulum
20	Chuck Wright's Sheltering Sky	Chuck Wright's Sheltering Sky
20	Evergrey	A Heartless Portrait (The Orphean Testament)
20	James LaBrie	Beautiful Shade of Gray
20	Malevolence	Malicious Intent
20	Ratos de Porão	Necropolítica
20	Sadist	Firescorched
20	Septicflesh	Modern Primitive
20	Spheric Universe Experience	Back Home
20	Zinny Zan	Lullabies for the Masses
25	Man with a Mission	Break and Cross the Walls II
27	Baest	Justitia (EP)
27	Brutality	Sempiternity
27	Cadaveria	Emptiness
27	Crematory	Inglorious Darkness
27	Decapitated	Cancer Culture
27	Def Leppard	Diamond Star Halos
27	Holocausto Canibal	Crueza Ferina
27	Lord Belial	Rapture
27	Michael Schenker Group	Universal
27	Mournful Congregation	The Exuviae of Gods – Part I (EP)
27	Odd Crew	Dark Matters (Part 1)
27	Trollfest	Flamingo Overlord
31	Ribspreader	Crypt World

=== June ===
Day	Artist	Album
3	The Algorithm	Data Renaissance
3	Astronoid	Radiant Bloom
3	Battlelore	The Return of the Shadow
3	Bleed from Within	Shrine
3	Gwar	The New Dark Ages
3	Killswitch Engage	Live at the Palladium (live album)
3	Las Cruces	Cosmic Tears
3	Memphis May Fire	Remade in Misery
3	Origin	Chaosmos
3	Red Handed Denial	I'd Rather Be Asleep
3	Thornhill	Heroine
5	Wolfsbane	Genius
10	Billy Howerdel	What Normal Was
10	Deadguy	Buyer's Remorse: Live from the Decibel Magazine Metal & Beer Fest (live album)
10	downset.	Maintain
10	Dragged Under	Upright Animals
10	Kiss	Off the Soundboard: Live at Donington 1996 (live album)
10	Kreator	Hate Über Alles
10	Michael Monroe	I Live Too Fast to Die Young
10	Motionless in White	Scoring the End of the World
10	Satyricon	Satyricon & Munch
10	Schandmaul	Knüppel aus dem Sack
10	Secrets	The Collapse
10	Seventh Wonder	The Testament
10	Severe Torture	Fisting the Sockets (EP)
10	Soreption	Jord
10	Tierra Santa	Destino
10	William DuVall	11.12.21 Live-In-Studio Nashville
10	Wind Rose	Warfront
13	Tombs	Ex Oblivion (EP)
15	Dir En Grey	Phalaris
15	Rings of Saturn	Rings of Saturn
17	Civil War	Invaders
17	Infanteria	Patriarch
17	Jorn	Over the Horizon Radar
17	Oni	Loathing Light
17	Seven Kingdoms	Zenith
17	Tungsten	Bliss
22	Manowar	The Revenge of Odysseus (Highlights) (EP)
22	Spiritbox	Rotoscope (EP)
24	Alestorm	Seventh Rum of a Seventh Rum
24	Betraying the Martyrs	Silver Lining (EP)
24	Between the Buried and Me	The Great Misdirect Live (live album)
24	Black River	Generation aXe
24	Black Stone Cherry	Live from the Royal Albert Hall... Y'All (live album)
24	Coheed and Cambria	Vaxis – Act II: A Window of the Waking Mind
24	Darkane	Inhuman Spirits
24	Dawn of Destiny	Of Silence
24	Enphin	End Cut
24	Khold	Svartsyn
24	Paganizer	Beyond the Macabre
24	Porcupine Tree	Closure/Continuation
24	Projected	Hypoxia
24	Victorius	Dinosaur Warfare Pt. 2 – The Great Ninja War
30	Bleeding Through	Rage (EP)

=== July ===
Day	Artist	Album
1	Derek Sherinian	Vortex
1	Greg Puciato	Mirrorcell
1	Haunt	Windows of Your Heart
1	Holy Dragons	Jörmungandr – The Serpent of the World
1	Massacre	Mythos (EP)
1	Municipal Waste	Electrified Brain
1	Randy Holden	Population III
1	Saint Asonia	Introvert (EP)
1	Shinedown	Planet Zero
1	Superheist	MMXX
6	Coldrain	Nonnegative
8	Altaria	Wisdom
8	Blind Channel	Lifestyles of the Sick & Dangerous
8	Powerwolf	The Monumental Mass – A Cinematic Metal Event (live album)
8	Wormrot	Hiss
13	Obituary	Cause of Death – Live Infection (live album)
13	Obituary	Slowly We Rot – Live & Rotting (live album)
15	Antigama	Whiteout
15	Jack Starr's Burning Starr	Souls of the Innocent
15	Mantar	Pain Is Forever and This Is the End
15	Senses Fail	Hell Is in Your Head
15	Sinner	Brotherhood
22	Hatriot	The Vale of Shadows
22	Imperial Triumphant	Spirit of Ecstasy
22	Karl Sanders	Saurian Apocalypse
22	Oceans of Slumber	Starlight and Ash
22	Palisades	Reaching Hypercritical
22	Scar for Life	Sociophobia
22	Witchery	Nightside
28	Bad Wolves	Sacred Kiss (EP)
28	Incantation	Tricennial of Blasphemy (compilation album)
29	Belphegor	The Devils
29	Black Magnet	Body Prophecy
29	Chat Pile	God's Country
29	Krisiun	Mortem Solis
29	Stick to Your Guns	Spectre
29	Torture Killer	Dead Inside (EP)

=== August ===
Day	Artist	Album
4	Tom Hunting	Hunting Party (EP)
5	Abaddon Incarnate	The Wretched Sermon
5	Amon Amarth	The Great Heathen Army
5	Dub War	Westgate Under Fire
5	Einherjer	Norse and Dangerous (Live... from the Land of Legends) (live album)
5	H.E.A.T	Force Majeure
5	Psycroptic	Superhuman Council
5	Soulfly	Totem
5	Toxik	Dis Morta
5	Vanden Plas	Live & Immortal (live album)
12	Arch Enemy	Deceivers
12	Boris	Heavy Rocks
12	The Halo Effect	Days of the Lost
12	Hollywood Undead	Hotel Kalifornia
12	Jackyl	30 Coming in Hot (compilation album)
12	Locrian	New Catastrophism
12	Locrian	Ghost Frontiers (EP)
12	Norma Jean	Deathrattle Sing for Me
14	Melvins	Bad Mood Rising
19	Conan	Evidence of Immortality
19	Five Finger Death Punch	AfterLife
19	Heilung	Drif
19	I Prevail	True Power
19	Lillian Axe	From Womb to Tomb
19	Parasite Inc.	Cyan Night Dreams
19	Psyclon Nine	Less to Heaven
19	Russian Circles	Gnosis
19	Soilwork	Övergivenheten
19	Spirit Adrift	20 Centuries Gone (compilation album)
26	Becoming the Archetype	Children of the Great Extinction
26	Brymir	Voices in the Sky
26	Dynazty	Final Advent
26	Grave Digger	Symbol of Eternity
26	Lacrimas Profundere	How to Shroud Yourself with Night
26	Long Distance Calling	Eraser
26	Machine Head	Of Kingdom and Crown
26	Santa Cruz	The Return of the Kings
26	Sigh	Shiki
26	Soil	Play It Forward (covers album)
26	Tad Morose	March of the Obsequious
27	Imperial Age	New World

=== September ===
Day	Artist	Album
1	Oceans Ate Alaska	Disparity
2	Blind Guardian	The God Machine
2	The Callous Daoboys	Celebrity Therapist
2	The Hu	Rumble of Thunder
2	Mad Max	Wings of Time
2	Mantic Ritual	Heart Set Stone (EP)
2	King's X	Three Sides of One
2	Megadeth	The Sick, the Dying... and the Dead!
2	Mike Tramp	For Første Gang
2	Miss May I	Curse of Existence
2	Novelists	Déjà Vu
9	Allen/Olzon	Army of Dreamers
9	Bloodbath	Survival of the Sickest
9	Fallujah	Empyrean
9	Holy Fawn	Dimensional Bleed
9	Kiss	Off the Soundboard: Live in Des Moines 1977 (live album)
9	KMFDM	Hyëna
9	Mezarkabul	Makina Elektrika
9	Ozzy Osbourne	Patient Number 9
9	Parkway Drive	Darker Still
9	Revocation	Netherheaven
9	Stray from the Path	Euthanasia
9	Trauma	Awakening
9	Ville Laihiala & Saattajat	Ei Meillä Ole Kuin Loisemme
9	Until I Wake	Inside My Head
16	The 69 Eyes	Drive (EP)
16	Behemoth	Opvs Contra Natvram
16	Clutch	Sunrise on Slaughter Beach
16	Destrage	SO MUCH. too much.
16	The Devil Wears Prada	Color Decay
16	Edenbridge	Shangri-La
16	Electric Callboy	Tekkno
16	Epoch of Unlight	At War with the Multiverse
16	Hartmann	Get Over It
16	Hetroertzen	Phosphorus, Vol. 1
16	House of Lords	Saints and Sinners
16	Marco Mendoza	New Direction
16	Omega Diatribe	My Sphere (EP)
16	Spiritus Mortis	The Great Seal
21	Dirty Woman	I Will Kill Again
23	KEN mode	Null
23	Moonspell	From Down Below – Live 80 Meters Deep (live album)
23	OvO	Ignoto
23	Razor	Cycle of Contempt
23	Silent Knight	Full Force
23	Stratovarius	Survive
23	Venom Inc.	There's Only Black
30	Autopsy	Morbidity Triumphant
30	Drowning Pool	Strike a Nerve
30	Rage	Spreading the Plague (EP)
30	Raven	Leave 'Em Bleeding (compilation album)
30	Sammy Hagar and the Circle	Crazy Times
30	Sceptic	Nailed to Ignorance
30	Slipknot	The End, So Far
30	Sonata Arctica	Acoustic Adventures – Volume Two
30	Tankard	Pavlov's Dawgs

=== October ===
Day	Artist	Album
1	Acid Witch	Rot Among Us
5	Liturgy	As the Blood of God Bursts the Veins of Time (EP)
7	Blind Illusion	Wrath of the Gods
7	Borealis	Illusions
7	Charlotte Wessels	Tales from Six Feet Under, Vol. II
7	Counterparts	A Eulogy for Those Still Here
7	The Cult	Under the Midnight Sun
7	Ellefson–Soto	Vacation in the Underworld
7	Goatwhore	Angels Hung from the Arches of Heaven
7	King Gizzard & the Lizard Wizard	Ice, Death, Planets, Lungs, Mushrooms and Lava
7	Lamb of God	Omens
7	Lost Society	If the Sky Came Down
7	Queensrÿche	Digital Noise Alliance
7	Wednesday 13	Horrifier
12	King Gizzard & the Lizard Wizard	Laminated Denim
14	Alter Bridge	Pawns & Kings
14	Bloody Hammers	Washed in the Blood
14	Dragonland	The Power of the Nightstar
14	Eleine	Acoustic in Hell (EP)
14	Gun	The Calton Songs
14	Lorna Shore	Pain Remains
14	Nothing More	Spirits
14	Outline in Color	Coast Is Clear
14	Skid Row	The Gang's All Here
14	Sleeping with Sirens	Complete Collapse
14	Varials	Scars for You to Remember
14	We Came as Romans	Darkbloom
21	Architects	The Classic Symptoms of a Broken Spirit
21	Avantasia	A Paranormal Evening with the Moonflower Society
21	Avatarium	Death, Where Is Your Sting
21	Black Veil Brides	The Mourning (EP)
21	Brutus	Unison Life
21	Exhumed	To the Dead
21	Gothminister	Pandemonium
21	In This Moment	Blood 1983 (EP)
21	Sahg	Born Demon
21	Serj Tankian	Perplex Cities (EP)
21	Stryper	The Final Battle
21	Ugly Kid Joe	Rad Wings of Destiny
21	A Wake in Providence	Eternity
21	WarCry	Daimon
21	White Skull	Metal Never Rusts
24	Galahad	The Last Great Adventurer
26	Fear, and Loathing in Las Vegas	Cocoon for the Golden Future
28	Brant Bjork	Bougainvillea Suite
28	Darkthrone	Astral Fortress
28	Dead Cross	II
28	Defleshed	Grind Over Matter
28	Demon Hunter	Exile
28	Despised Icon	Déterré (EP)
28	Dr. Acula	Dr. Acula
28	Fear Factory	Recoded (remix album)
28	Fire from the Gods	Soul Revolution
28	Fit for a King	The Hell We Create
28	Joe Lynn Turner	Belly of the Beast
28	King Gizzard & the Lizard Wizard	Changes
28	Royal Hunt	Dystopia – Part II
28	Sodom	40 Years at War – The Greatest Hell of Sodom (compilation album)
28	Therion	Leviathan II

=== November ===
Day	Artist	Album
4	96 Bitter Beings	Synergy Restored
4	Black Anvil	Regenesis
4	Dayseeker	Dark Sun
4	Depresszió	Vissza a Földre
4	Devin Townsend	Lightwork
4	Disillusion	Ayam
4	Frank Bello	Then I'm Gone (EP)
4	Ingested	Ashes Lie Still
4	Voivod	Ultraman (EP)
8	Vinnie Moore	Double Exposure
11	Arallu	Death Covenant
11	Chelsea Grin	Suffer in Hell
11	Drudkh	Всі належать ночі
11	Enuff Z'Nuff	Finer Than Sin
11	Epica	The Alchemy Project (EP)
11	He Is Legend	Endless Hallway
11	Kampfar	Til Klovers Takt
11	Last in Line	A Day in the Life (EP)
11	Leatherwolf	Kill the Hunted
11	Ring of Fire	Gravity
11	Xentrix	Seven Words
18	16	Into Dust
18	Aurora Borealis	Prophecy Is the Mold in Which History Is Poured
18	Autograph	Beyond
18	Candlemass	Sweet Evil Sun
18	Disturbed	Divisive
18	Nickelback	Get Rollin'
18	Ronnie Atkins	Symphomaniac (EP)
18	Saint Asonia	Extrovert (EP)
18	Soen	Atlantis (live album)
18	Tallah	The Generation of Danger
18	Threshold	Dividing Lines
18	U.D.O.	The Legacy (compilation album)
18	Wolves at the Gate	Lowborn (EP)
25	Elder	Innate Passage
25	Hibernus Mortis	The Monoliths of Cursed Slumber
25	In the Woods...	Diversum
25	Judicator	The Majesty of Decay
25	The Last Ten Seconds of Life	Disquisition on an Execution (EP)
25	Leather	We Are the Chosen
25	Lee Aaron	Elevate
25	Ofermod	Ofermodian Litanies (mini-album)
25	Sword	III
28	Necrodeath	Singin' in the Pain

=== December ===
Day	Artist	Album
1	Indepth (MX)	Ancient Architects
2	Amberian Dawn	Take a Chance – A Metal Tribute to ABBA (covers album)
2	Deströyer 666	Never Surrender
2	Eisregen	Wiedergänger (EP)
2	Hammers of Misfortune	Overtaker
9	Lionheart	Welcome to the West Coast III
9	Ripper	Return to Death Row (EP)
9	Serenity	Memoria (live album)
14	Nemophila	Seize the Fate
15	Rotting Christ	The Apocryphal Spells, Vol. I (EP)
15	Rotting Christ	The Apocryphal Spells, Vol. II (EP)
22	Rudra	Eight Mahavidyas
25	Snowy Shaw	This Is Heavy Metal, Plain & Simple (compilation album)
30	Lord of the Lost	Blood & Glitter
30	Satanic Warmaster	Aamongandr

Preceded by 2021	Heavy Metal Timeline; 2022	Succeeded by 2023
