= Claustrophobia (disambiguation) =

Claustrophobia is the fear of confined spaces.

Claustrophobia or Claustrophobic may also refer to:

== Films and television ==
- Claustrophobia (2003 film), an American horror thriller
- Claustrophobia (2008 film), a Hong Kong romantic drama
- Claustrophobia, a 2011 film featuring Russell Harvard
- "Claustrophobia" (Code Lyoko), a television episode

== Music ==
- Claustrofobia (band), a Brazilian death metal band

=== Songs ===
==== "Claustrophobia" ====
- "Claustrophobia", by 3OH!3 from Night Sports, 2016
- "Claustrophobia", by the Bee Gees from The Bee Gees Sing and Play 14 Barry Gibb Songs, 1965
- "Claustrophobia", by Choir of Young Believers from This Is for the White in Your Eyes, 2008
- "Claustrophobia", by Lacuna Coil from Delirium, 2016
- "Claustrophobia", by Luna Sea, released as a B-side on the single "Believe", 1993
- "Claustrophobia", by Serj Tankian and Arto Tunçboyacıyan from Serart, 2003
- "Claustrophobia", by the Stooges from The Weirdness, 2007

==== "Claustrophobic" ====
- "Claustrophobic", by Amar from Outside, 2000
- "Claustrophobic", by Ednaswap from Wacko Magneto, 1997
- "Claustrophobic", by Future and Metro Boomin from We Don't Trust You, 2024
- "Claustrophobic", by Six Feet Under from Bringer of Blood, 2003
- "Claustrophobic", by PJ Morton from Gumbo, 2017
