= Märvel =

Swedish rock band

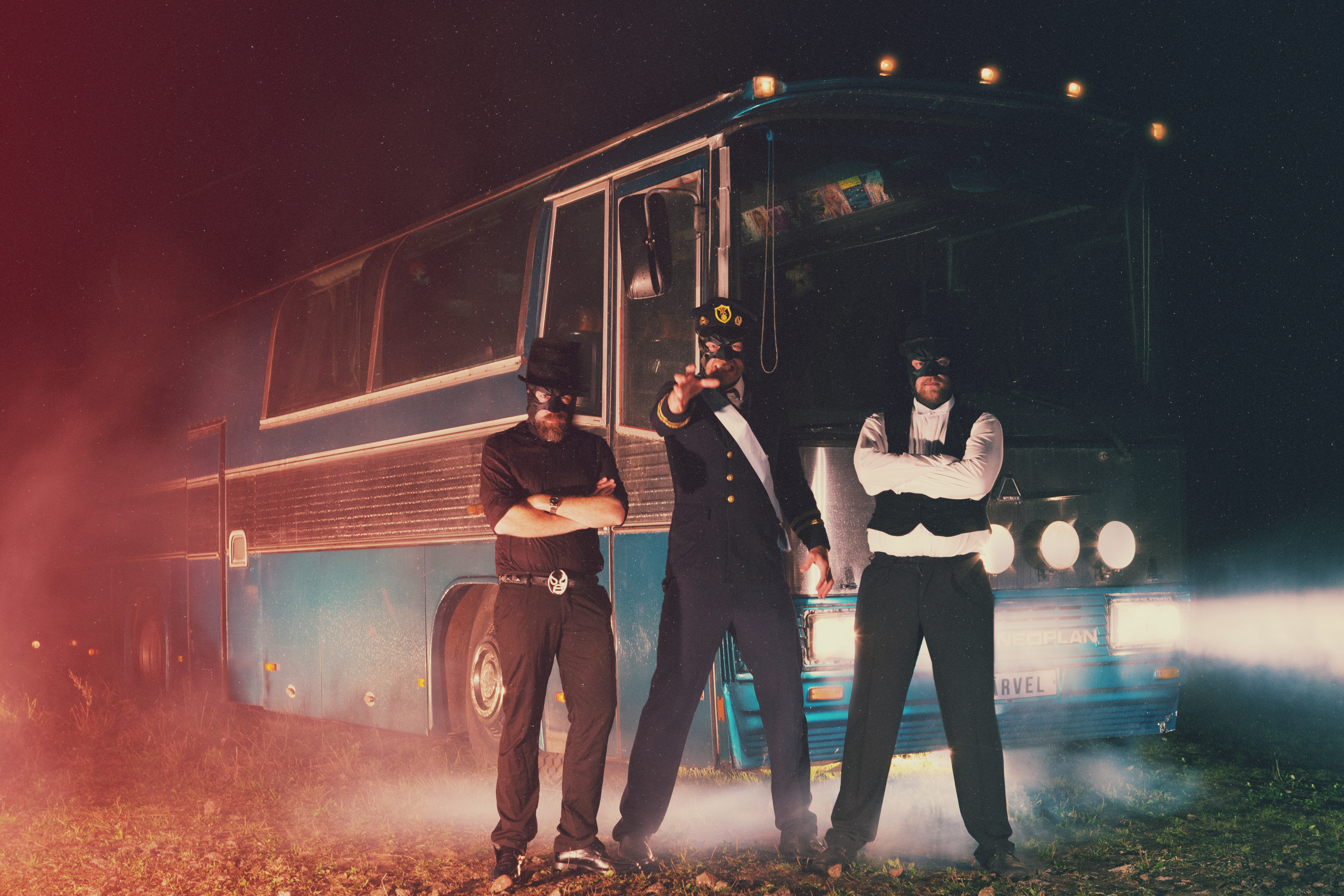
- The Märvel trio of the Vicar (left), the King (center), and Burgher (right) in front of their tour bus.

Background information
- Origin: Linköping, Sweden
- Genres: Hard rock; Rock and Roll; Heavy metal; Glam rock
- Years active: 2002–present
- Labels: Black Juju; Siren Recordings; Killer Cobra Records; Ghost Highway Recordings; The Sign Records
- Members: John Steen; Ulrik Bostedt; Tony Samuelsson
- Website: marvel.nu

Märvel are a rock band from Linköping, Sweden, active since 2002. The band consists of The King (John Steen) on guitar and vocals, The Burgher (Ulrik Bostedt) on bass, and The Vicar (Tony Samuelsson) on drums. Nicknamed The Barons of High Energy Rock 'n' Roll, the trio frequently delve into rock and roll, hard rock, and heavy metal.

The band stands apart from other rock groups by donning masks and headgear during performances to match their individual personas. Furthermore, members of the group are not replaced; with previous members always able to link up and play with the band.

Fans of Märvel belong to different provinces of The Märvel Army fan club, which is prominent in 12 countries. Provinces are organized by club presidents, which also have their own masked personas.

== History ==
=== Formation and first album (2002–2006) ===
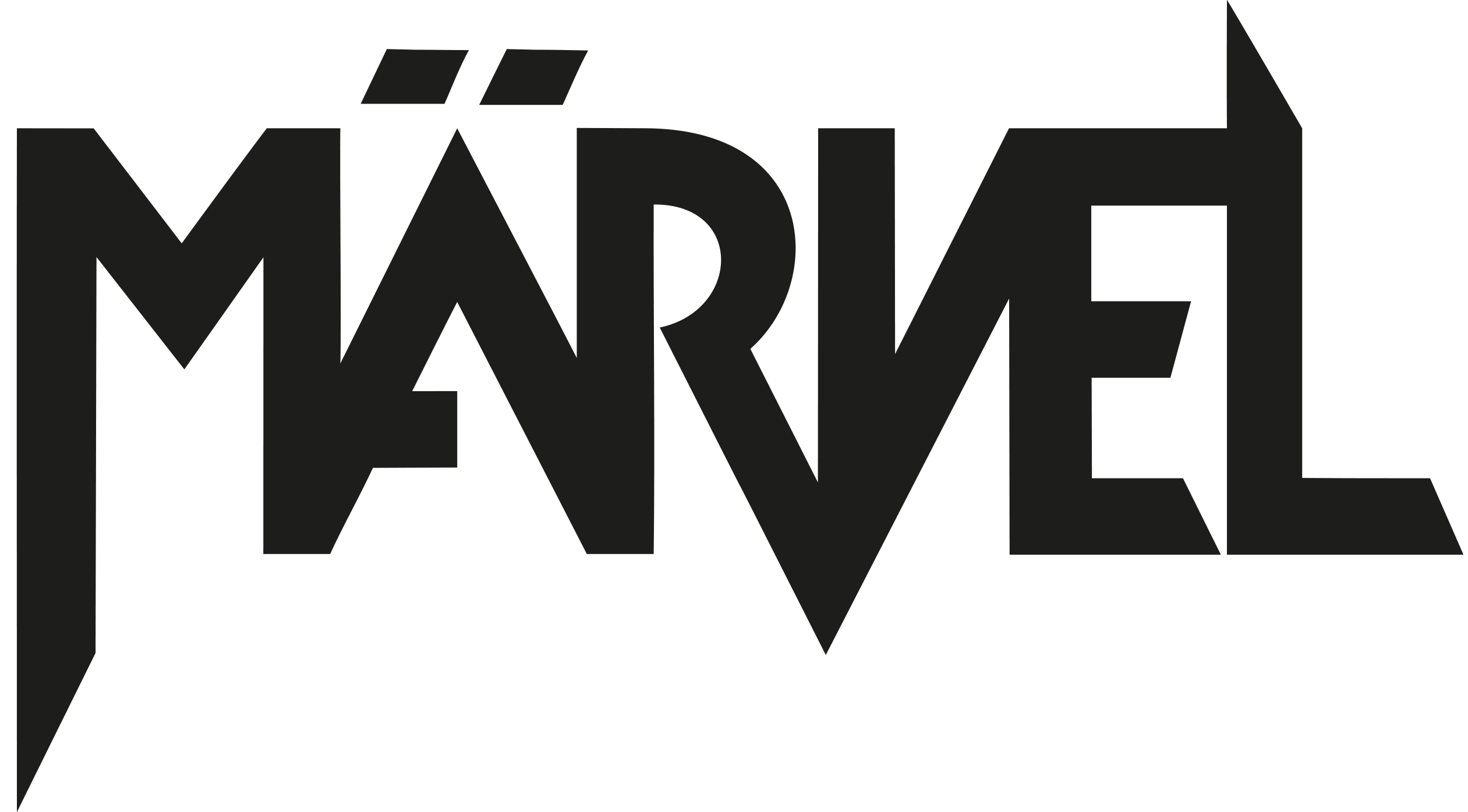
The official Märvel logo

The group came together in 2002 when the trio of John Steen, Ulrik Bostedt, and Tony Samuelsson spent a year as exchange students in Colorado, United States. They formed under the name of Märvel, inspired by the Marvel comic book heroes with a metal umlaut to help distinguish themselves from the company and reflect their gritty, hard-rock sound. Working together on music rather than their grades, they released the vinyl Marvellous through the independent music label New York Powerhitters. They stuck together upon returning to their hometown of Linköping, releasing two EPs Heroine Tracks and Bedlam At The Embassy. They donned superhero costumes and went by the original titles of Vocalo, The Ambassador, and Animalizer.

Most of the things I do in a mask I wouldn’t do without one, it’s like having a get out of jail free card. Wearing a mask can really be a door-opener.

— The Burgher, 2015, Classic Rock Magazine

They released their first full-length album in 2005, Five Smell City, after a nickname for the city of Linköping. Following the release of the album the group toured around Europe while performing covers for their upcoming Unleashed! EP.

=== A growing following (2006–2013) ===
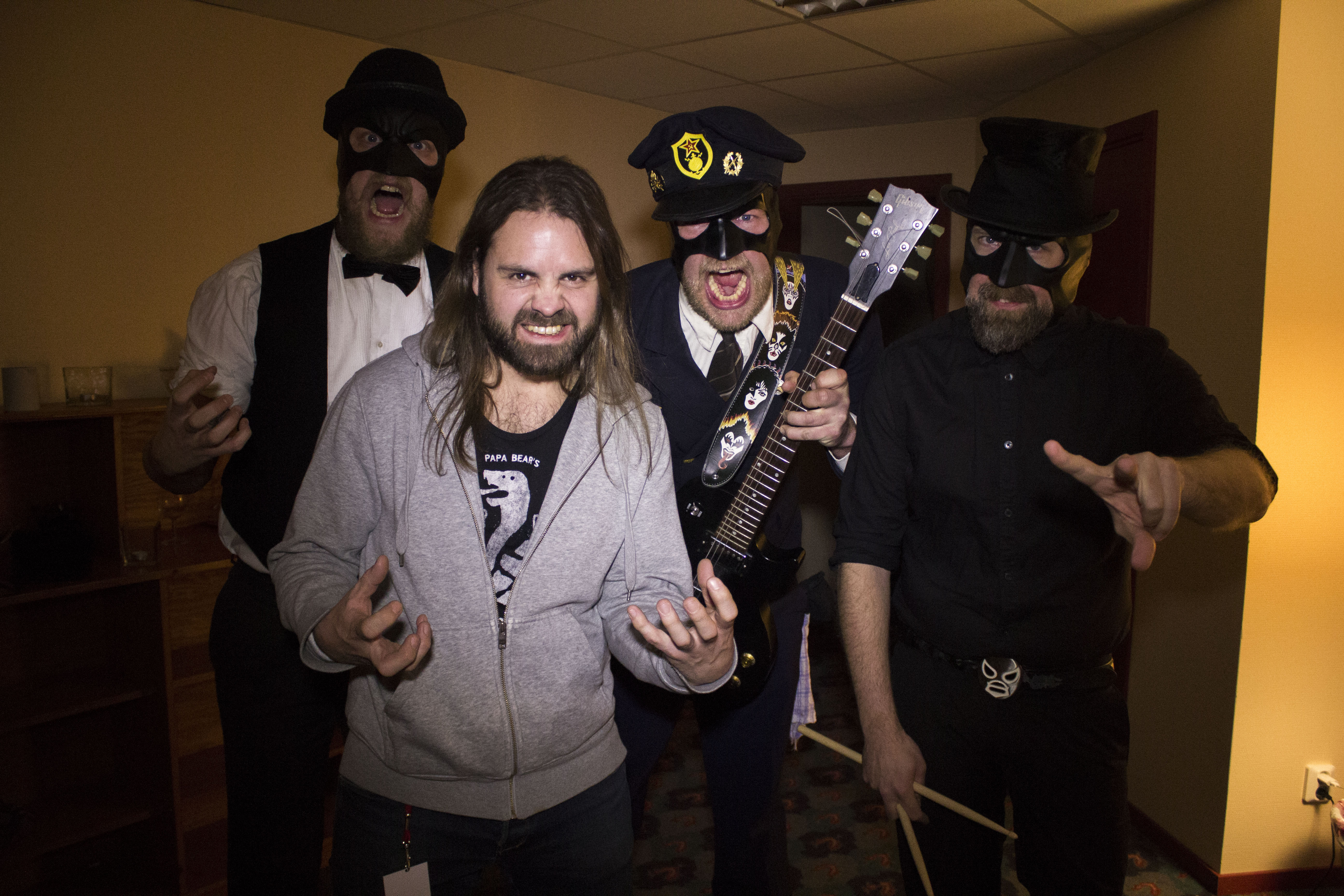
Märvel with drummer/producer Fred Estby while on tour with Dregen

Unleashed! was released in 2006 to moderate reviews, featuring covers of bands such as Bon Jovi and Kiss. By now their songs were receiving airtime in Europe, with fanbases establishing themselves elsewhere in Scandinavia and Germany. With another major release just around the corner in 2007, the group adopted new stage names of The King, The Vicar, and Speedo. Due to travel restrictions, another bass player, The Aviator, was recruited for touring purposes as the band released their second full-length album Thunderblood Heart in September 2007. The album had a very positive response, with the first single "I Wanna Know You (just a little bit better)" getting a music video with GBG Wrestling. The group continued to tour through 2008 and played with members of The Backyard Babies at the Dreamhack gaming festival in June. The following year, they released the single "A Pyrrhic Victory" with an accompanying tour in Germany. The single was a hit, getting a music video which featured in an interview on Swedish TV channel 24Corren. Portions of the Warhawks of War tour were spliced together to make a road movie. Actor Johannes Brost was a fan of the new album, filming an unboxing, a first-listen, and reaction music video of the track "Hello!" to help promote it.

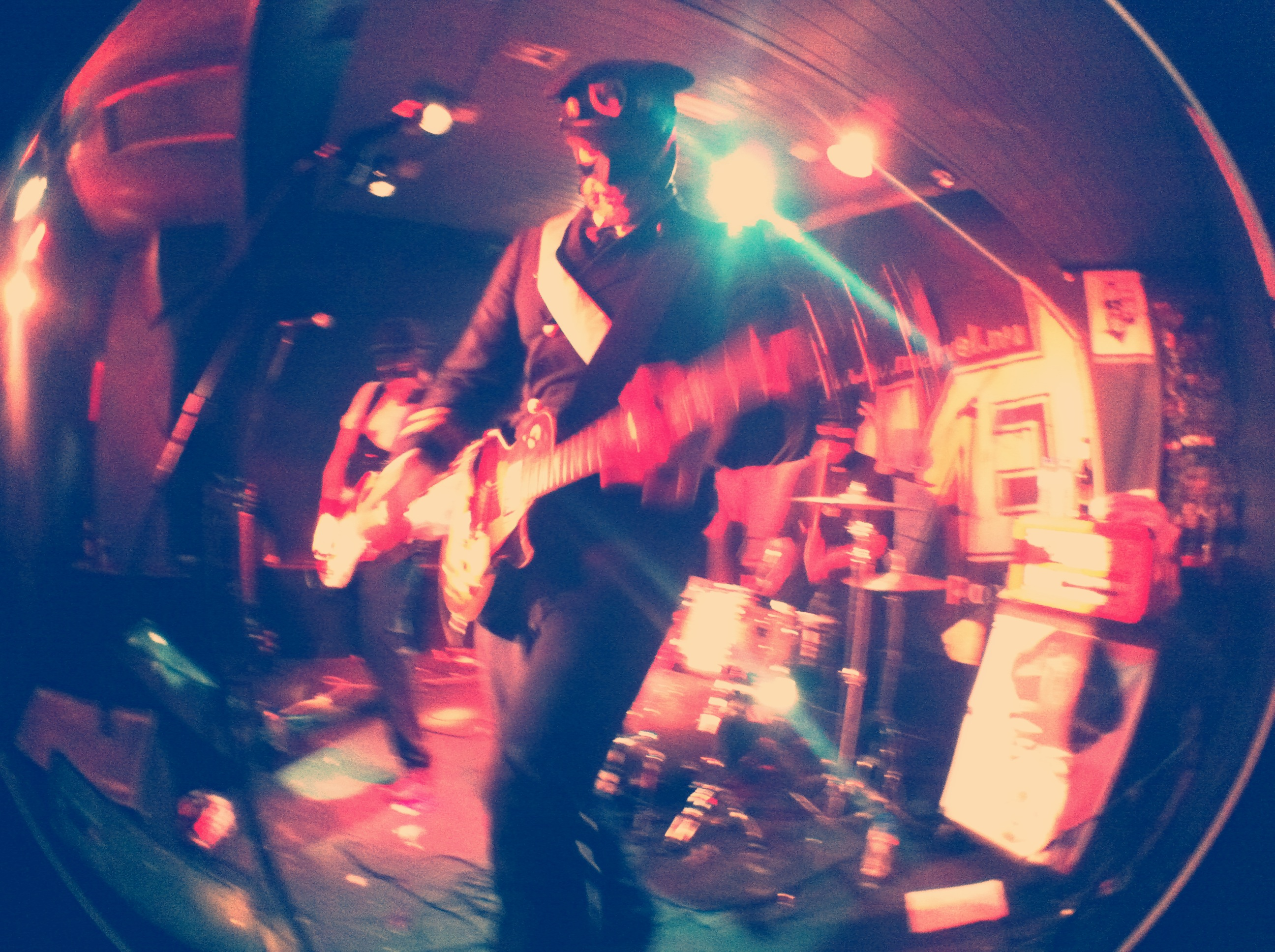
Fisheye view of Märvel live in Marl, North Rhine-Westphalia, 2011.

Warhawks of War released in 2011 on Killer Cobra Records to positive reviews with a faster, harder sound than previously seen in Thunderblood Heart. The band had multiple guest musicians join them for the album, including Robert Dahlqvist ("Strängen") and Andreas Tyrone Svensson ("Dregen") from the Hellacopters. It was during this time that The Aviator retired from touring, and the band recruited a new bassist in the form of The Burgher. Warhawks of War was a hit, with the band touring Germany, Spain, and France in promoting it. The Burgher's debut recording was on the single "Metalhead", which released in June 2012. However, in 2013 the band was financially exhausted and had to start a pledge campaign to resume work on their 4th album. By then, Dregen was getting a solo-album off the ground and chose Märvel to tour Scandinavia with him in autumn of that year.

=== An established sound for a new label (2014-present) ===
The outcome of 2013's campaign would see the release of The Hadal Zone Express in March 2014. The album was a success, heavily influenced by 70s/80s glam with some very fast tracks such as "Danish Rush" and "Black Money". Michael Stalling of Metal.de called the album "Fun from beginning to end... each track has its own character and lets the album rock on". "Danish Rush" got a music video directed by Johan Bååth (the Doits) and filmed by Peder Carlsson (Backyard Babies), which features many members of the Hellacopters and has a chiptune version of the track in the credits. The band continued generating new songs and co-produced The Hills Have Eyes minialbum with Fred Estby, incorporating folk aspects to their recordings from Estby's studio Gutterview Recorders. A reinterpretation of W.A.S.P.'s song "L.O.V.E Machine" on the album got a music video using wooden mannequin figures and won the Honolulu 2016 Film Awards for best music video. The band would travel to the United Kingdom for the first time to attend the 2016 Hard Rock Hell festival and subsequently picked up drummer Tony Thornensson, with the stage name of The Charlatan.

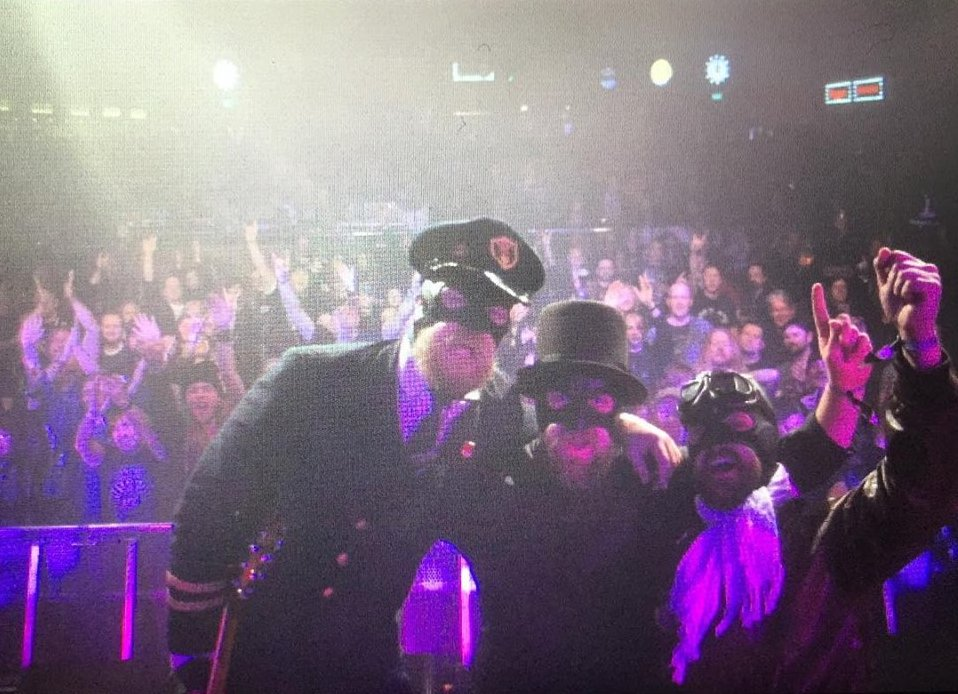
Märvel at the Hard Rock Hell festival in 2016

In 2016 their label, Killer Cobra Records, would close and leave the band looking for someone new. In 2017 they signed with Swedish rock label The Sign Records, with which they're active to this day. The new label made it possible for a U.S. release of The Hills Have Eyes on CD and made some of their older material more accessible outside of Europe. Around this time, the band would move to a devoted studio called the Solskensfabriken, where they would be able to record and master their material. Märvel would release their seventh album, MÄRVEL at the Sunshine Factory, in October to positive reviews. Andy Thorley of Maximum Volume Music gave it an 8.5/10 and called it "A record that, given a couple of listens, will reveal its true majesty". In 2017 Märvel would participate at the Fishbait Festival on Åland, doing a special performance with Robert "Humbucker" Pehrsson, Nicke Borg (Backyard Babies), and Sator members Chips Kiesbye and Kent Norberg.

In March 2019 Märvel contributed to a collaborative album by including the track "The Devil Stole The Beat From The Lord" on Payin' Our Dues: A Tribute To The Hellacopters. The following month in April the band released Guilty Pleasures, their first cover album since Unleashed! in 2006. The album drew from many unique styles of music, with the band putting their own hard-rock twist on them. Songs such as the surf-rock "El Camino Real" by Lee Dresser and a 180 BPM version of pub-rock "Sultans of Swing" by Dire Straits.

In January 2020, Märvel released the EP Märvellous, which featured four re-recorded tracks from their original 2002 EP.

In March 2022, the band announced their seventh album, Graces Came with Malice, would be released on April 22.

== Musical style and influences ==
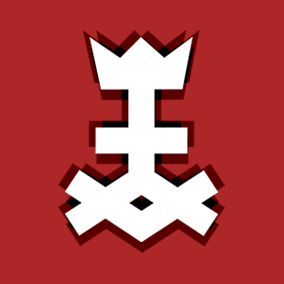
The Märvel symbol representing the King (the crown), the Vicar (the cross), and the Burgher (the freemason)

The band takes much of its influence from hard rock, heavy metal, and flamboyant glam rock. Bands such as Thin Lizzy, T-Rex, W.A.S.P., Mötley Crüe, and RATT can be picked out of Märvel's musical style, with swinging vocals and fast guitars. Other Scandinavian acts before them, such as the Hellacopters, Turbonegro, and Gluecifer are also frequently cited as influences on their performances. However, the most evident influence on the band are Kiss.

The King described their style as "High Energy Rock" in a 2013 interview with Motor.de. "It (High Energy Rock) is a very powerful form of communication and in Sweden it's forbidden to play it when you're older than 30." When asked about particularly influential bands on their sound, he responded "We're music addicts and we mix everything we can together. We're not interested in what's popular or not. We're plain and simple: In-your-face Rock n' Roll Evangelists!"

Outside of their performances, Märvel don't live the lifestyles present in some of their lyrics. In a 2016 interview with Raw Ramp, they described themselves as "...not rowdy party dudes. We are more into the music than the err…. [life style] … we let the other bands do the partying."

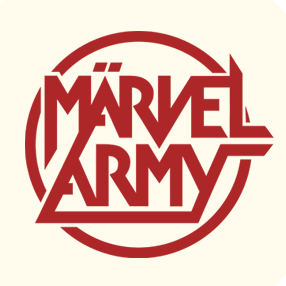
The official logo of the Märvel fan club, the Märvel Army.

== In other media ==
Märvel attracted the attention of the deep sea oceanographic community in 2020 thanks to their album The Hadal Zone Express. The eponymous single became an opening track for The Deep Sea Podcast and the band was invited to the podcast by Thomas Linley and Alan Jamieson on episode 7, discussing their artistic direction for the album. Co-host Alan promised that the track would be played in the hadal zone and recorded the song being played while diving aboard the DSV Limiting Factor for episode 11.

"We thought about ACDC's "Highway to Hell" and we thought we'd reverse the process. That's our take on it. We're going lower than anyone has before - we're going down into the abyss."

— John Steen, The Deep Sea Podcast

== Discography ==
=== Studio albums ===
- Five Smell City (2005)
- Thunderblood Heart (2007)
- Warhawks Of War (2011)
- Hadal Zone Express (2014)
- At the Sunshine Factory (2017)
- Guilty Pleasures (2019)
- Graces Came with Malice (2022)
- Brain Drain Diaries (2025)

=== EPs/LPs ===
- Marvellous (2002)
- Heroine Tracks (2003)
- Bedlam At The Embassy (2004)
- Unleashed! (2006)
- The Hills Have Eyes (2015)
- Märvellous (2020)

=== Singles ===
- A Pyrrhic Victory (2009)
- Metalhead / Ambassador of Fantastic (2012)
- Motherfucker (2015)

=== Compilation albums ===
- Double Decade (2023)

=== Collaborations ===
- Märvel collaborated with The Chuck Norris Experiment, releasing a 7" vinyl with their single "Motherfucker" (2015)
- Märvel added to Payin' Our Dues: A Tribute To The Hellacopters with the track "The Devil Stole The Beat From The Lord" (2019)
