= Three Sides of One =

Studio album by King's X
- Released: September 2, 2022
- Recorded: 2010–2022
- Genre: Hard rock, progressive metal
- Length: 46:48
- Label: Inside Out
- Producer: Michael Parnin

King's X chronology
XV (2008)	Three Sides of One (2022)

Singles from Three Sides of One
- 1. "Let It Rain" Released: June 24, 2022; 2. "Give It Up" Released: July 27, 2022; 3. "All God's Children" Released: August 26, 2022

Three Sides of One is the 13th studio album by American rock band King's X, released on September 2, 2022, through Inside Out Music. It is their first studio album in fourteen years, since 2008's XV, marking the longest gap between two studio albums in their career.

== Background ==
While work on Three Sides of One began as early as 2010, years of slow progress had ensued due to each member of the band focusing on his respective solo or side projects. The album's progress was also sidelined by health issues involving the members, with drummer Jerry Gaskill suffering a heart attack on two occasions, and bassist and vocalist Doug Pinnick diagnosed with a lymph node infection. By 2015, Gaskill and Pinnick had recovered from their respective health issues, and in June of that year, Pinnick told Eddie Trunk that King's X was "committed to a new record" but was unsure of when the band would enter the studio to record it.

In August 2018, Pinnick announced that King's X had "officially decided" to make the follow-up to XV, explaining, "We had a meeting with our manager, and we said, 'Okay. It's a go. Move forward.' So that's the next thing. He's gotta work the contract out, the logistics of where to make the record, who's gonna produce it, where we're gonna stay, how we're gonna do it, how we're gonna rehearse before, how we're gonna go there and write together, how we're gonna bring songs in — how we're gonna do it. So that's the next step. But it's getting done. And that's a good thing. Before, it was just talk for years and years and years. Now we have a commitment. I'll see how long that lasts, but I'm waiting." In October of that year, it was announced that the band had signed to the Australian independent record label, Golden Robot Records, who had planned to release their thirteenth studio album in the U.S., Australia and Europe sometime in 2019; within the next few years, however, the album would face myriad delays, due to COVID-related manufacturing issues as well as the slow pace of the band working on new material.

In April 2022, it was reported that the album had been mastered, and a month later, King's X had signed to Inside Out/Sony Music and announced that the then-still-untitled record would be released on September 2, 2022. The band revealed Three Sides of One as the album's title on June 24, 2022, and its lead single "Let It Rain" was released on the same day. The album's second single, "Give It Up", was released on July 27. The third single, "All God's Children", was released on August 26.

== Reception ==
Three Sides of One reached No. 10 on the USA Current Album Sales Chart, #2 on USA Current Hard Music Albums Chart, #3 on USA Current Rock Albums Chart, #21 on UK Vinyl Chart, #15 on UK Physical Albums Chart, and #21 on German Albums Chart, making it one of the most globally successful albums of the band's career.

Classic Rock Magazine gave it a 3.5 out of 5 rating and called it "Classy, intelligent, sonically powerful stuff",

BraveWords gave it an 8 out 10 rating and called the band "Masters of their craft, to be sure, just as they were in 1988 at the start of their career",.

Sonic Perspectives gave it an 8.9 out of 10 rating and said "The marvel of Three Sides of One is you get the three unique voices and playing that converge into one glorious sound".

Metal Injection gave it a 9 out of 10 rating, and raved "It's as if the band took some of the best pieces of their signature songcraft and put them all together specifically for Three Sides of One. Yet nothing is retread or repetitive. The album clearly stands out on its own as unique in their vast catalog. King's X is one of the greatest bands on the planet and their latest release only further cements this and their place in the realm of music history."

The album also came in at No. 88 on the 'Best Rock Albums of 2022' list on the ClassicRockHistory site.

== Track listing ==
Three Sides of One track listing
No.	Title	Length
1.	"Let It Rain"	4:28
2.	"Flood Pt. 1"	3:03
3.	"Nothing But the Truth"	6:03
4.	"Give It Up"	2:59
5.	"All God's Children"	5:32
6.	"Take the Time"	3:45
7.	"Festival"	3:30
8.	"Swipe Up"	3:46
9.	"Holidays"	3:22
10.	"Watcher"	3:43
11.	"She Called Me Home"	3:57
12.	"Every Everywhere"	2:40
Total length:		46:48

== Personnel ==
- Doug Pinnick – bass, lead vocals
- Ty Tabor – guitars, backing vocals
- Jerry Gaskill – drums, backing vocals

Additional personnel

- Wally Farkas – vocals on "Give It Up", "All God's Children", "Swipe Up" & "She Called Me Home"

== Charts ==
Chart performance for Three Sides of One
Chart (2022)	Peak position
German Albums (Offizielle Top 100)	21
Scottish Albums (OCC)	15
UK Album Downloads (OCC)	47
