= Victorius (band) =

German power metal band

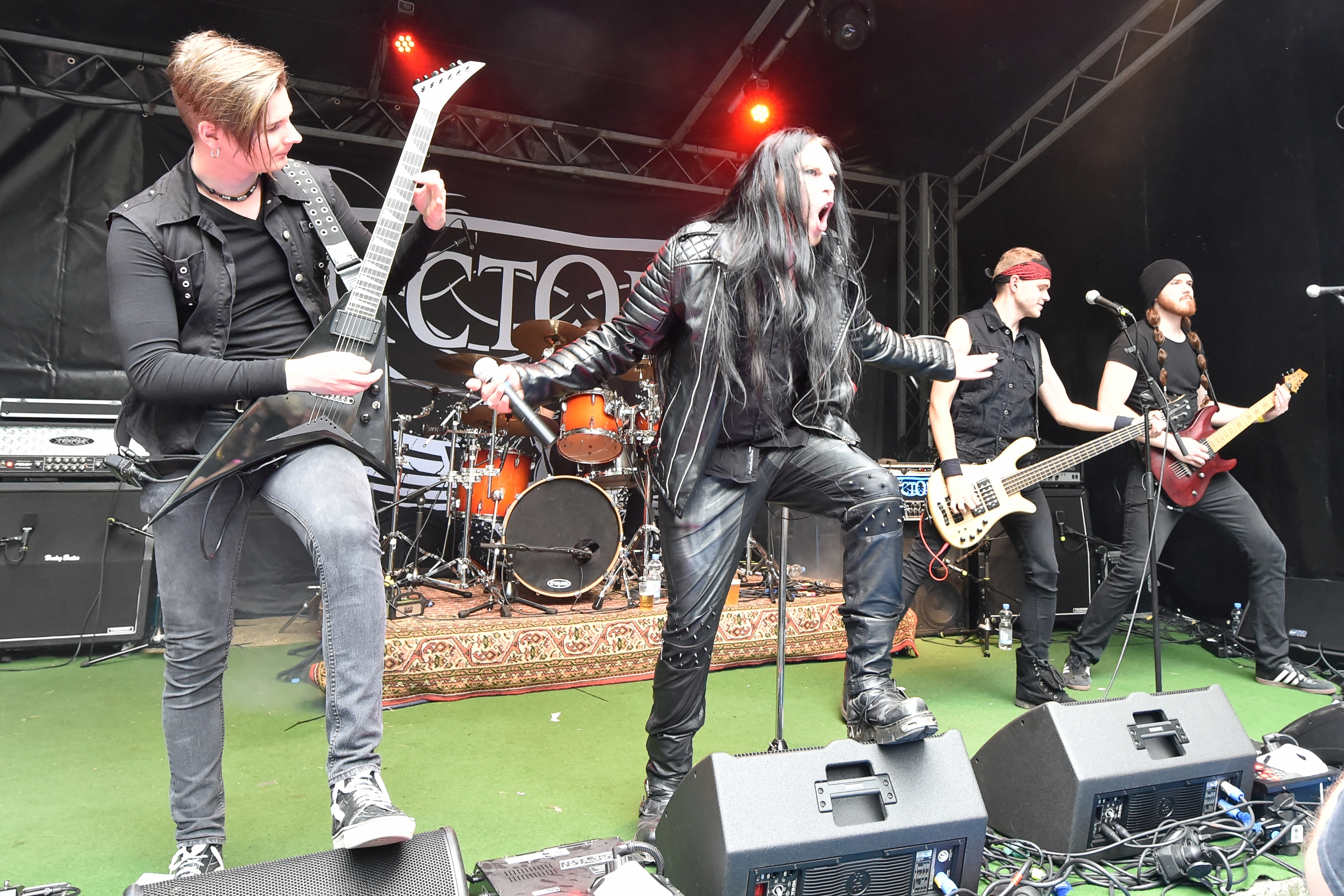
- Victorius at Rage Against Racism 2017 in Duisburg

Background information
- Origin: Leipzig, Germany
- Genres: Power metal
- Years active: 2004–present
- Members: David Baßin; Dirk Scharsich; Florian Zack; Andreas Dockhorn; Frank Koppe
- Past members: Steven Dreißig; Steven Lawrenz; Rainer Frisch; Tyl Fiedler; Rene Wähler; Rustam Guseinov
- Website: victoriusmetal.net

Victorius is a German power metal band from Leipzig, formed in 2004.

== History ==
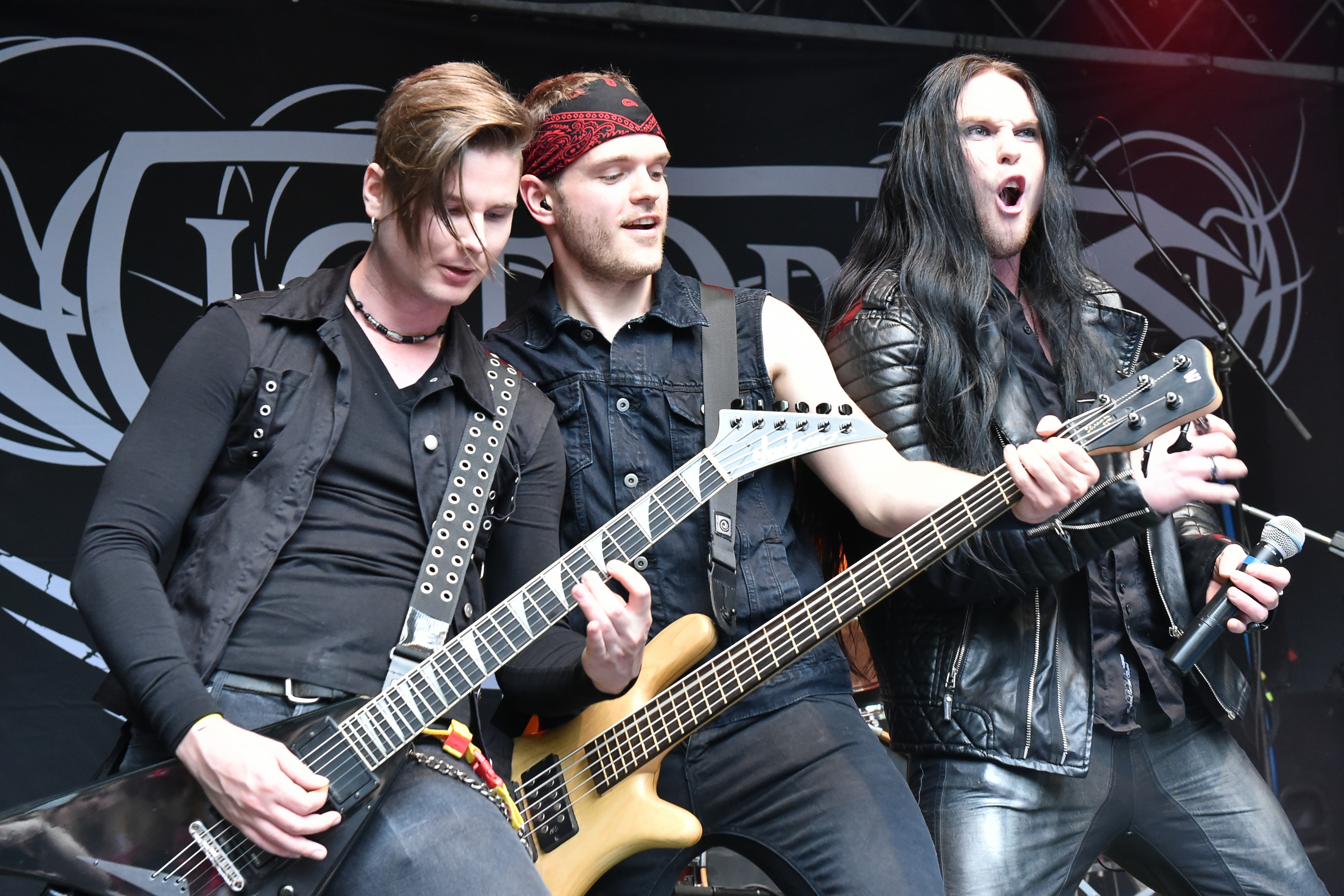
Dirk Scharsich, Andreas Dockhorn and David Baßin

Victorius was founded in 2004. The band self-produced an untitled demo in 2008 and the album Unleash the Titans in 2010. During this time the band played many concerts in the German metal underground. The highlight was a concert on the main stage of the Metalfest Open Air Germany 2010 in Dessau.

In 2012, the band caught the attention of record labels by self-producing the album The Awakening. A record deal followed with Sonic Attack Records/SPV for the European and North American markets, as well as a record deal with Avalon-Marquee for the Japanese market. The album was then released on CD in 2013 on three continents. In addition to various club concerts in Germany, the band also played at the Rockharz Open Air 2013. In early 2014, the band toured with Freedom Call in Germany, the Netherlands and Switzerland.

In 2014 the band released the next studio album Dreamchaser through the same record companies as the previous album. In addition to a release on CD, there was also a release on record for the first time. The band played concerts in Germany and Norway in the course of the release. The following year the band performed at the More Than Fest in Banská Bystrica, Slovakia, among others. In 2016, Victorius played as the opening act for the a cappella metal band Van Canto on their European tour.

On 13 January 2017, the album Heart of the Phoenix was released, which was released through the new label Massacre Records. In the course of the subsequent release tour supporting the German heavy metal band Grave Digger, Victorius not only played concerts in Germany and Switzerland but also in Austria for the first time.

In January 2018, the band released a new EP, Dinosaur Warfare – Legend of the Power Saurus, which was also released by Massacre Records. In Japan, the CD was released by Fabtone. Victorius then played numerous headlining shows advertised as the Tour of the Power Saurus. The band first played in Japan, Poland, Slovenia, France, Romania, Belgium and Great Britain. The band has also toured Germany, Austria and Switzerland as support for German metal band Mystic Prophecy. A European tour with German metal band Majesty follows in 2019.

In 2019, Victorius was signed by Napalm Records. The first album under the Napalm Records label, Space Ninjas from Hell, was released in January 2020. In the course of the coronavirus pandemic, all concerts and tours in 2020 and 2021 had to be postponed. In 2022, the band announced a new album under the Napalm Records label, combining the concepts of the EP Dinosaur Warfare – Legend of the Power Saurus and the album Space Ninjas from Hell into a joint new concept album, Dinosaur Warfare Pt.2 – The Great Ninja War, reaching #51 in the German charts. The European tour already planned for 2020 could also be made up for in 2022.

== Members ==
Victorius at Metal Frenzy 2017

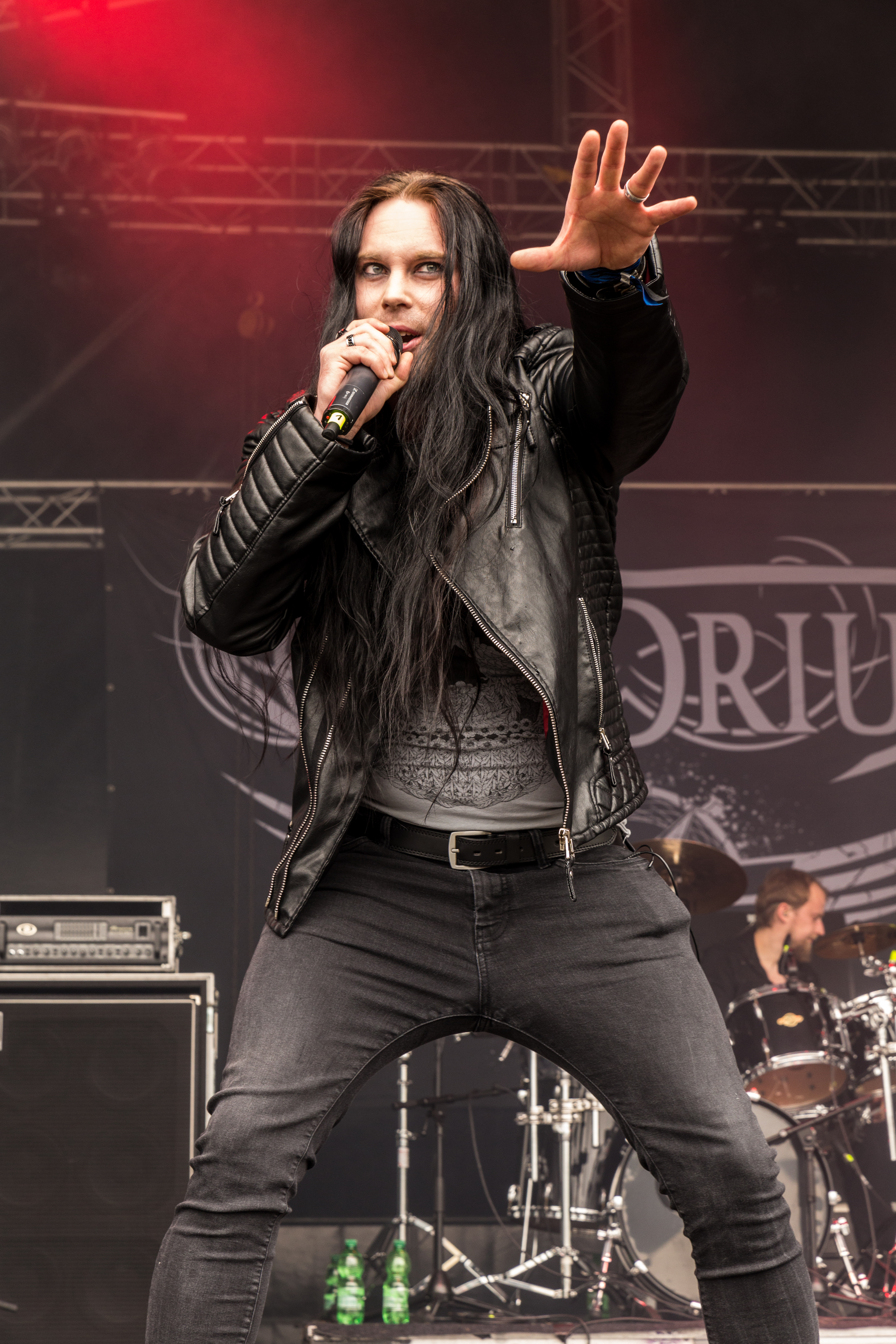
David Baßin

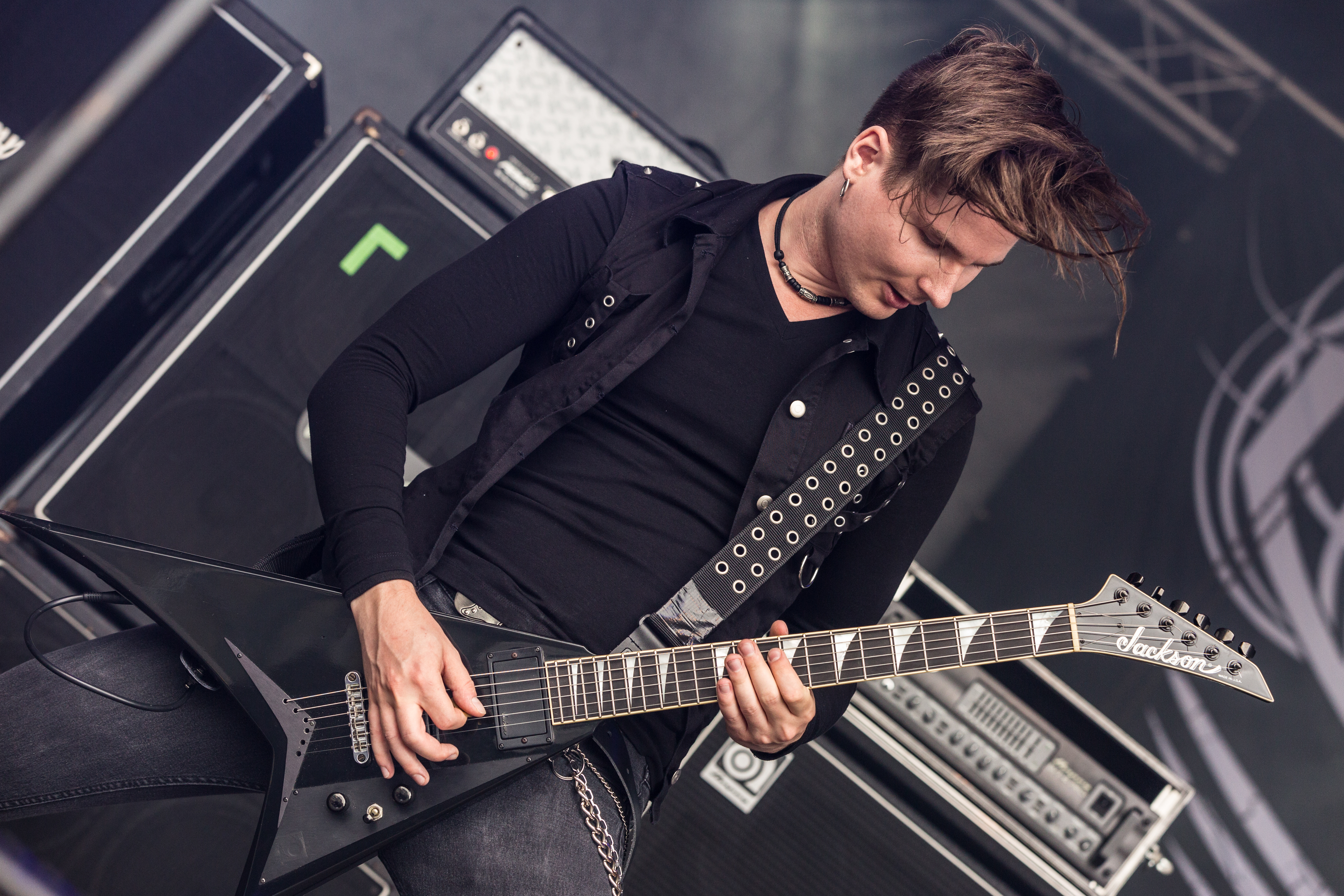
Dirk Scharsich

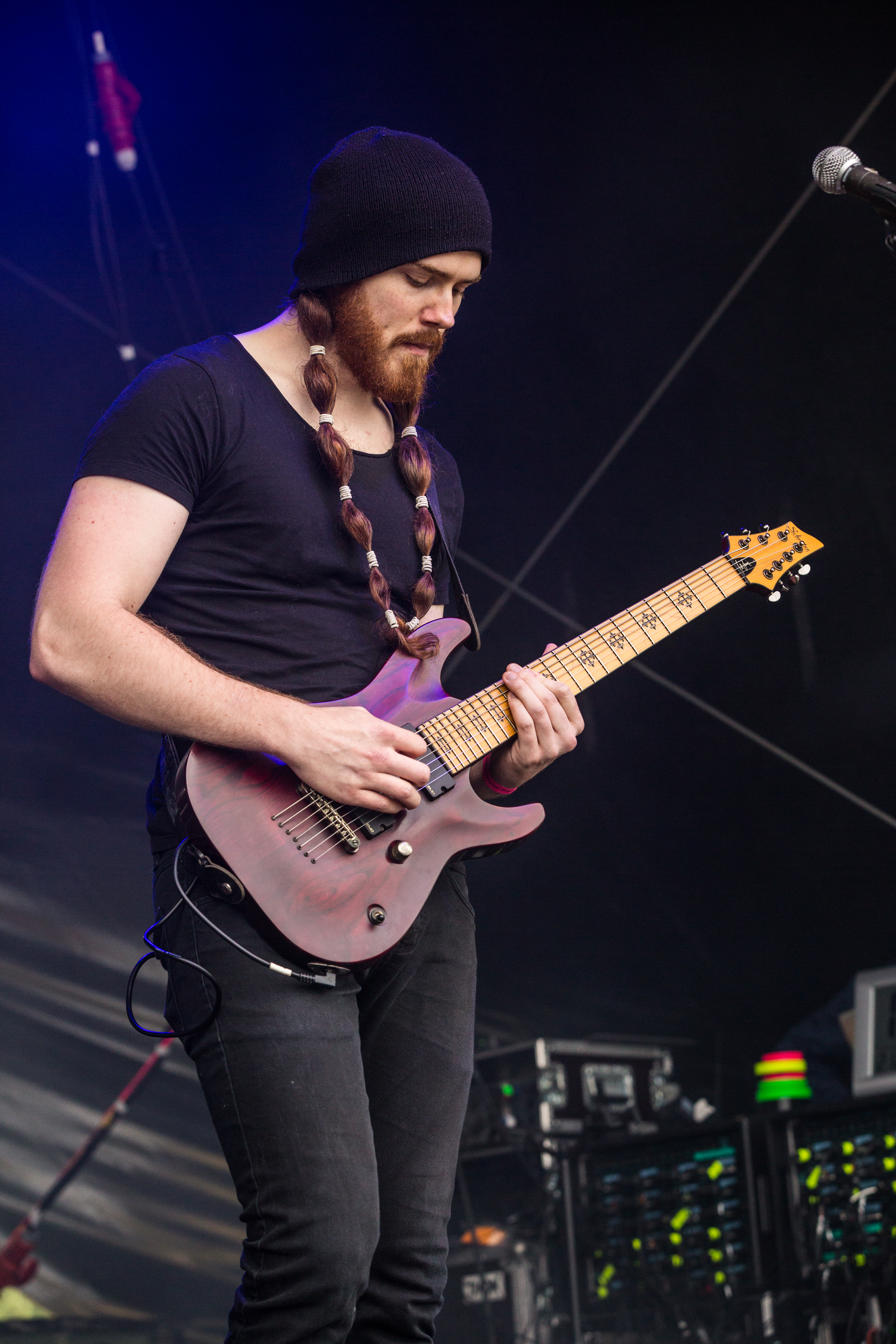
Florian Zack

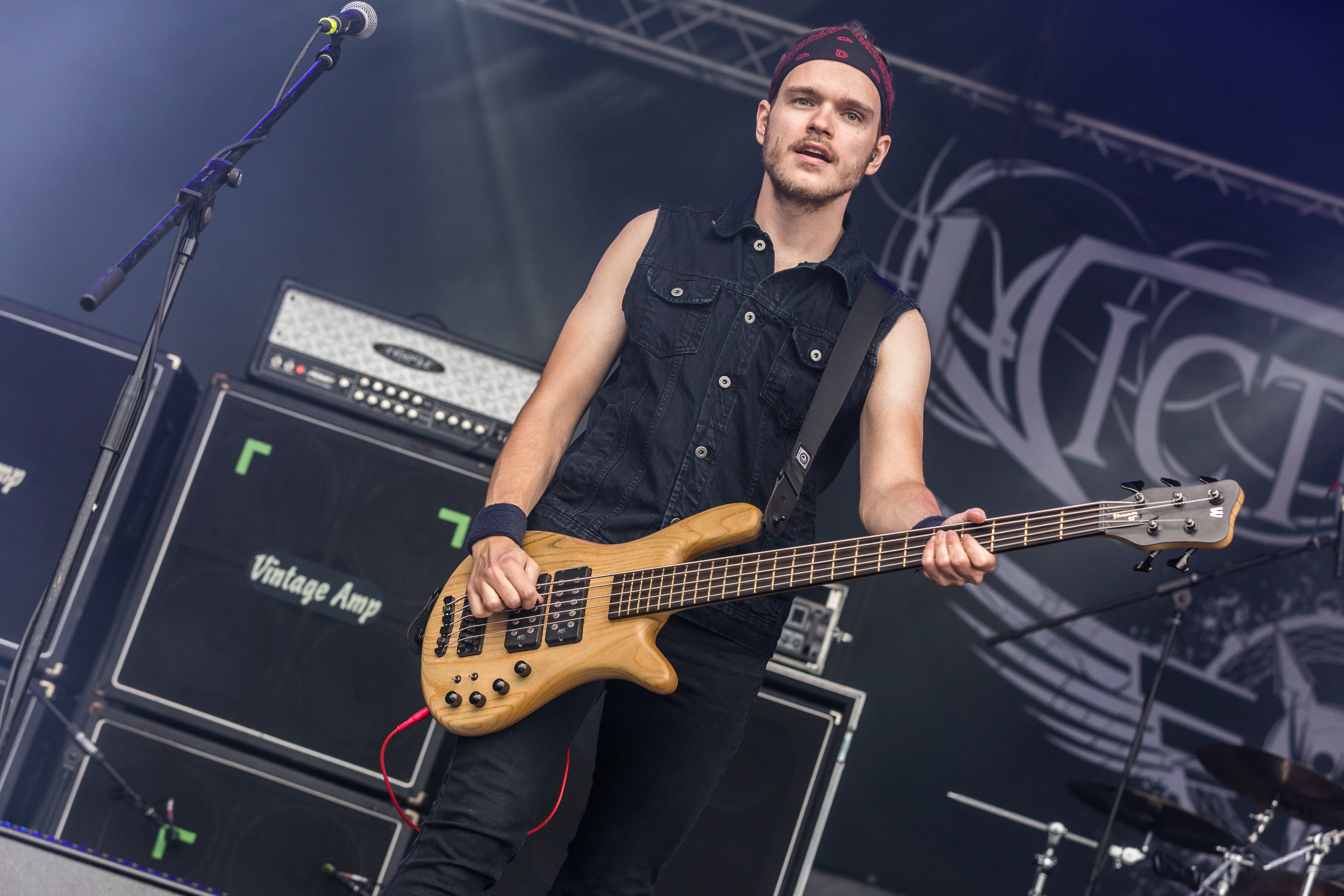
Andreas Dockhorn

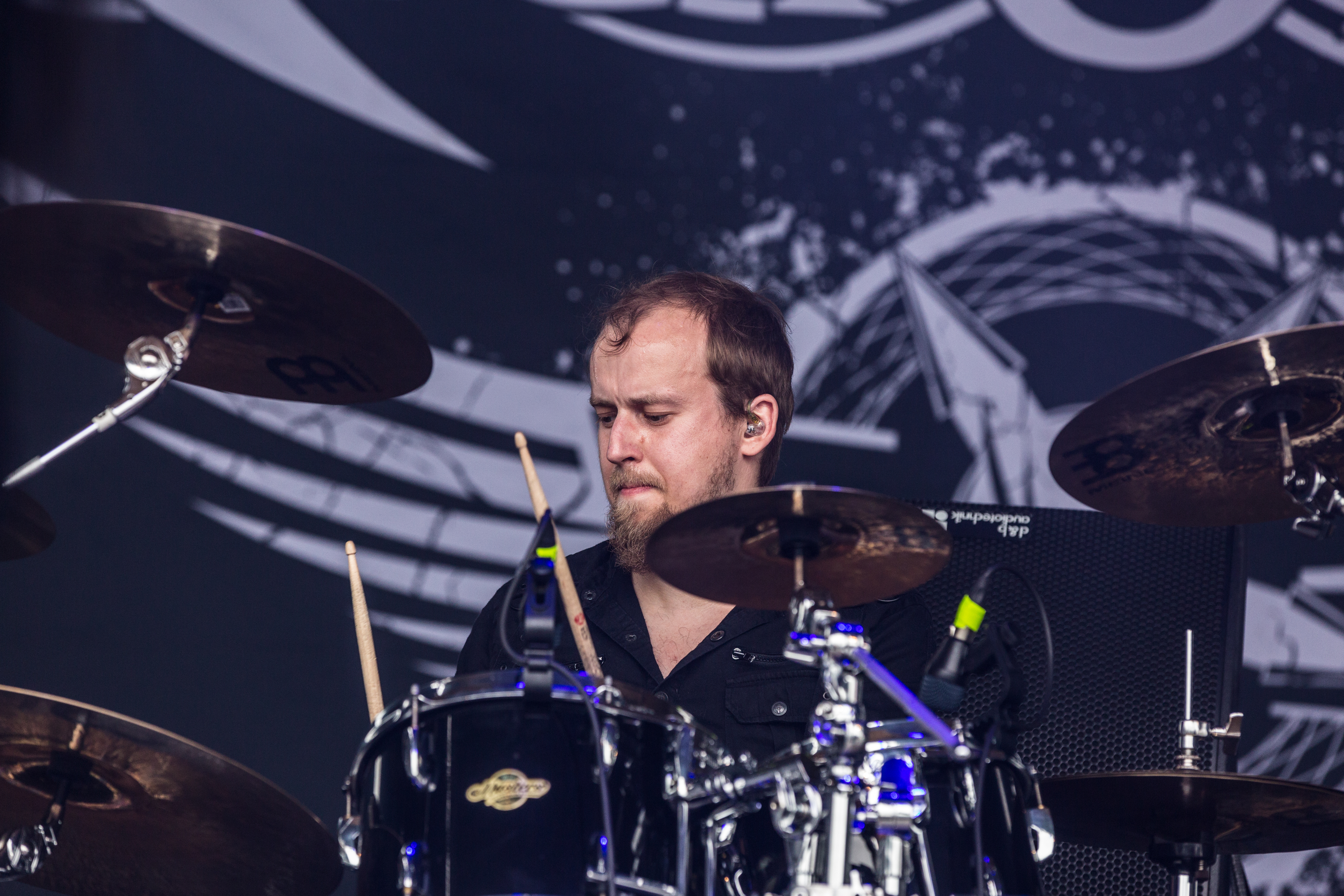
Frank Koppe

== Discography ==
Studio albums

- 2010: Unleash the Titans (self-released)
- 2012: The Awakening (Sonic Attack / SPV)
- 2014: Dreamchaser (Sonic Attack / SPV)
- 2017: Heart of the Phoenix (Massacre Records)
- 2020: Space Ninjas from Hell (Napalm Records)
- 2022: Dinosaur Warfare Pt. 2 – The Great Ninja War (Napalm Records)
- 2026: World War Dinosaur (Reigning Phoenix Music)

EPs

- 2018: Dinosaur Warfare – Legend of the Power Saurus (Massacre Records)
