= The God Machine (album) =

Studio album by Blind Guardian
- Released: 2 September 2022
- Recorded: 2018–2021
- Studios: Twilight Hall Studio, Grefrath, Germany
- Genres: Power metal; speed metal
- Length: 51:08
- Label: Nuclear Blast
- Producers: Charlie Bauerfeind, Joost van den Broek

Blind Guardian chronology
Legacy of the Dark Lands (2019)	The God Machine (2022)

Singles from The God Machine
- 1. "Deliver Us from Evil" Released: 3 December 2021; 2. "Secrets of the American Gods" Released: 18 March 2022; 3. "Blood of the Elves" Released: 27 May 2022; 4. "Violent Shadows" Released: 29 July 2022

The God Machine is the twelfth studio album by the German power metal band Blind Guardian, released on 2 September 2022 through Nuclear Blast. This is the band's first regular studio album in seven years, following Beyond the Red Mirror (2015), marking the longest gap between two Blind Guardian studio albums (although a previous album was released three years earlier under the name "Blind Guardian Twilight Orchestra").

The album's cover art was illustrated by American artist Peter Mohrbacher as part of the Angelarium project.

== Background and recording ==
Production of The God Machine took place throughout the global COVID-19 pandemic; however some of the songs were written before 2020. Frontman Hansi Kürsch feared unforeseeable individual and social consequential damage from the pandemic. "For us, however, it was good from a creative point of view because we were able to take our time. We could think: What do we actually want? It has to represent us and it has to represent the time", Kürsch confirms the influence. "For me it could have been even a bit heavier. During the pre-production I was even involved in death metal at times. But the other band members vetoed that."

"We didn't want to rehash our qualities from 1995, but didn't want to continue down this complex path forever either. The God Machine is a new beginning for us. We've set a new course and gone back to certain things that we've neglected a bit on the last few albums", Kürsch told music publications in May 2022.

== Critical reception ==
Professional ratings
Review scores
Source	Rating
BraveWords	8/10
Classic Rock	3/5 stars
Metal Hammer	4.5/5 stars
Metal.de	9/10
Metal Injection	8/10
My Global Mind	5/5
Sonic Perspectives	4.8/5

Marcel Rapp of powermetal.de praised the album, comparing it to 1990s Blind Guardian records: "Is The God Machine the best album after Nightfall in Middle-Earth? Possibly, because you haven't heard the Krefeld band so determined, heavy and direct since 1998."

Travis Green of My Global Mind wrote: "Fans of any of the band's previous works should find a lot to love here, while any fan of the genre who somehow hasn't discovered the band yet would do no better than to start with this album, as it's one of the band's finest efforts to date!"

Laureline Tilkin of Tuonela Magazine praised the album as well and noted that some tracks show the band's return to their earlier speed metal sound.

== Lyrical references ==
- "Deliver Us from Evil" is about Arthur Miller's play The Crucible.
- "Damnation" is about The Kingkiller Chronicle, a fantasy series written by Patrick Rothfuss.
- "Secrets of the American Gods" references Neil Gaiman's fantasy novel American Gods.
- "Violent Shadows" is about Kaladin Stormblessed and his life as a bridgeman in Brandon Sanderson's fantasy novel series The Stormlight Archive.
- "Life Beyond the Spheres" is about the creation of the universe, (The Big Bang specifically) the first moments after the beginning of everything, and the evolution of space and time.
- "Architects of Doom" references the science fiction franchise Battlestar Galactica.
- "Let It Be No More" deals with the death of frontman Hansi Kürsch's mother, as well as The Leftovers.
- "Blood of the Elves" references the first novel in The Witcher series, Blood of Elves, written by Andrzej Sapkowski.
- "Destiny" is inspired by the tale The Ice-Maiden written by Hans Christian Andersen.

== Track listing ==
All tracks are written by André Olbrich and Hansi Kürsch.

The God Machine track listing
No.	Title	Length
1.	"Deliver Us from Evil"	5:22
2.	"Damnation"	5:21
3.	"Secrets of the American Gods"	7:29
4.	"Violent Shadows"	4:18
5.	"Life Beyond the Spheres"	6:03
6.	"Architects of Doom"	6:21
7.	"Let It Be No More"	4:49
8.	"Blood of the Elves"	4:38
9.	"Destiny"	6:47
Total length:		51:08

Limited Edition
No.	Title	Length
10.	"Life Beyond The Spheres (Cyber Mix)"	6:06
11.	"Destiny (Lead Guitar Version)"	6:42
12.	"Let It Be No More (Heavy Vocals)"	4:51
Total length:		17:40

== Personnel ==
Blind Guardian

- Hansi Kürsch – vocals
- André Olbrich – lead guitar
- Marcus Siepen – rhythm guitar
- Frederik Ehmke – drums

Guest musicians

- Barend Courbois – bass
- Thomas Geiger – effects and keyboards
- Joost van den Broek – keyboards on "Life Beyond the Spheres"

== Charts ==
Chart performance for The God Machine
Chart (2022)	Peak position
Australian Hitseekers Albums (ARIA)	19
Austrian Albums (Ö3 Austria)	6
Belgian Albums (Ultratop Flanders)	77
Belgian Albums (Ultratop Wallonia)	88
Finnish Albums (Suomen virallinen lista)	19
German Albums (Offizielle Top 100)	2
Italian Albums (FIMI)	53
Japanese Albums (Oricon)	42
Japanese Hot Albums (Billboard Japan)	48
Polish Albums (ZPAV)	7
Scottish Albums (Official Charts)	21
Spanish Albums (Promusicae)	13
Swedish Albums (Sverigetopplistan)	57
Swiss Albums (Schweizer Hitparade)	5
UK Independent Albums (Official Charts)	6
UK Rock & Metal Albums (Official Charts)	4
