= Infanteria =

Metal band

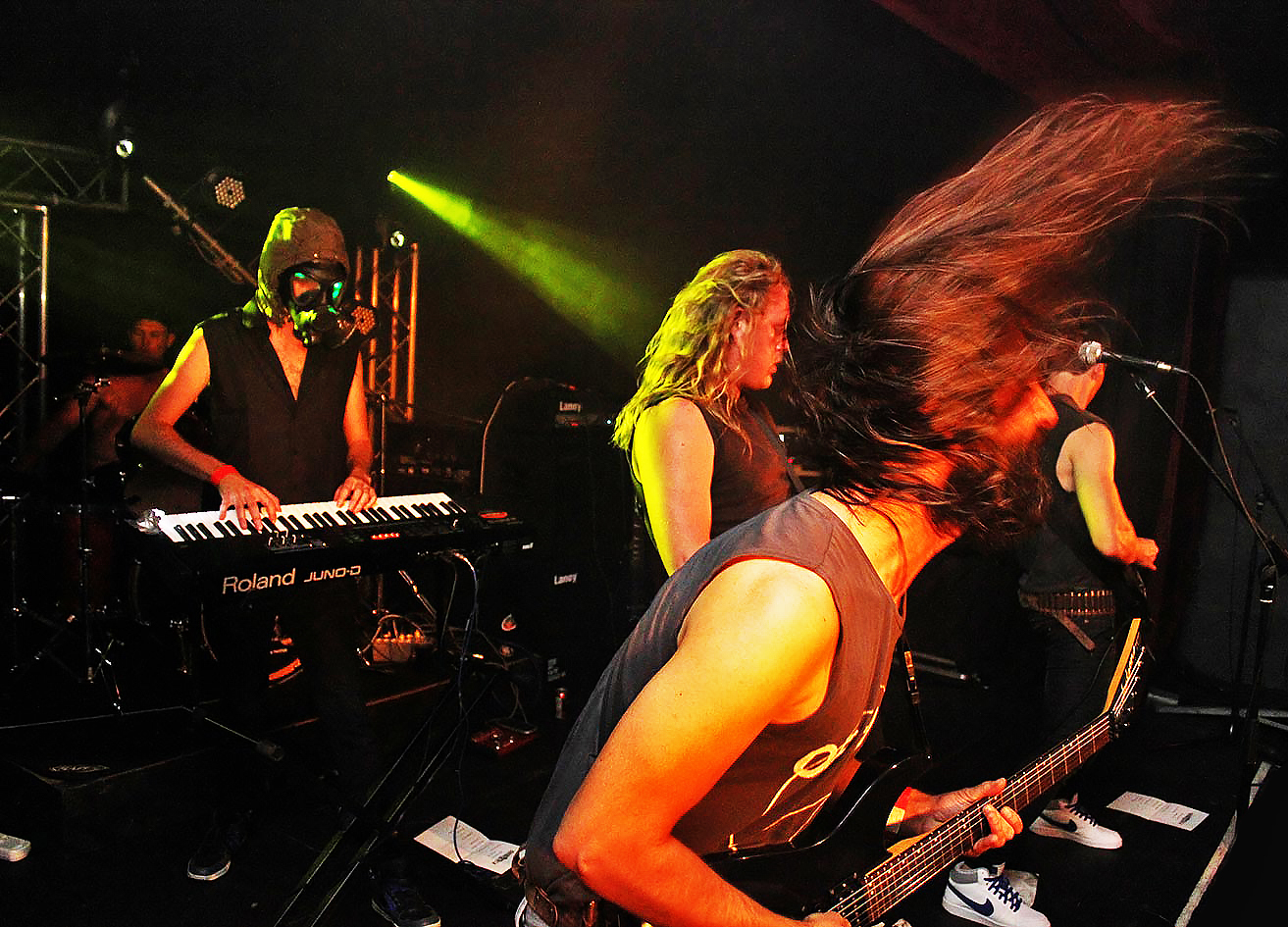
- Infanteria performing in 2013

Background information
- Origin: Cape Town, South Africa
- Genres: Heavy Metal, Thrash metal
- Years active: 2006– present
- Label: Independent (formerly Burning Tone)
- Members: Chris Hall; Tim Leibbrandt; Adrian Langeveld
- Past members: Rob Hall; Adriano Rodrigues; Mark Pote; Jared Phillips; Jarod Firmani; Barry Pieterse

Infanteria is a South African progressive thrash metal band from Cape Town formed in 2005.

== History ==
Thrash metal band Infanteria started out with the brothers Chris and Rob Hall playing Metallica covers in 2005. The band was officially started in early 2006 when Barry Pieterse joined, followed shortly thereafter by Jarrod Firmani. Infanteria have played numerous South African festivals, namely Metal4Africa's SummerFest'13 and co-headlined WinterFest'15. Infanteria played at RAMFest twice, the first time being in 2011. In 2014 they then opened for Trivium and Killswitch Engage.

Infanteria represented South Africa at Wacken Open Air (W:O:A) in August 2013, after winning their local heat in Cape Town and the South African finals in Johannesburg of the Wacken Metal Battle.

== Musical style ==
Infanteria's lyrical content makes many inferences to war, personal struggles and mortality.

== Band members ==
Current members

- Chris Hall - guitar and vocals
- Tim Leibbrandt - bass
- Adrian Langeveld - drums

Former members

- Adriano Rodrigues - guitar
- Rob Hall - drums
- Jared Phillips - keyboard
- Mark Pote - bass
- Jarrod Firmani - bass
- Barry Pieterse - guitar

== Discography ==
=== Singles ===
Infanteria released their first single in 2009, on Hammer the Masses 2 compilation album titled "Making a Killing". The second single was released on Hammer the Masses 3 complication album in 2010, titled "Let Death Decide". "Cataclysmic Oppression" was the lead single for debut album Isolated Existence in 2013. In 2015 two singles were released in support of the Where Serpents Conquer album titled "Throes of Fear" and "We All Have Dreams". The latest single, titled "Embrace The Trauma", was released on June 3, 2022 in support of Infanteria's third album, Patriarch.

=== Isolated Existence ===
On February 2 2013, Infanteria released their debut album, Isolated Existence via Burning Tone Records. The album was mixed and mastered by Louis Henn of Burning Tone Studios.

=== Where Serpents Conquer ===
On July 3 2015, Infanteria released their sophomore album, Where Serpents Conquer via Burning Tone Records. The album was mixed and mastered by Louis Henn and Heinrich Köllner of Burning Tone Studios.

=== Patriarch ===
On June 17 2022, Infanteria released their third album, Patriarch. The album was produced, mixed and mastered by Heinrich Köllner.
