= Troglodyte (band) =

US death metal band

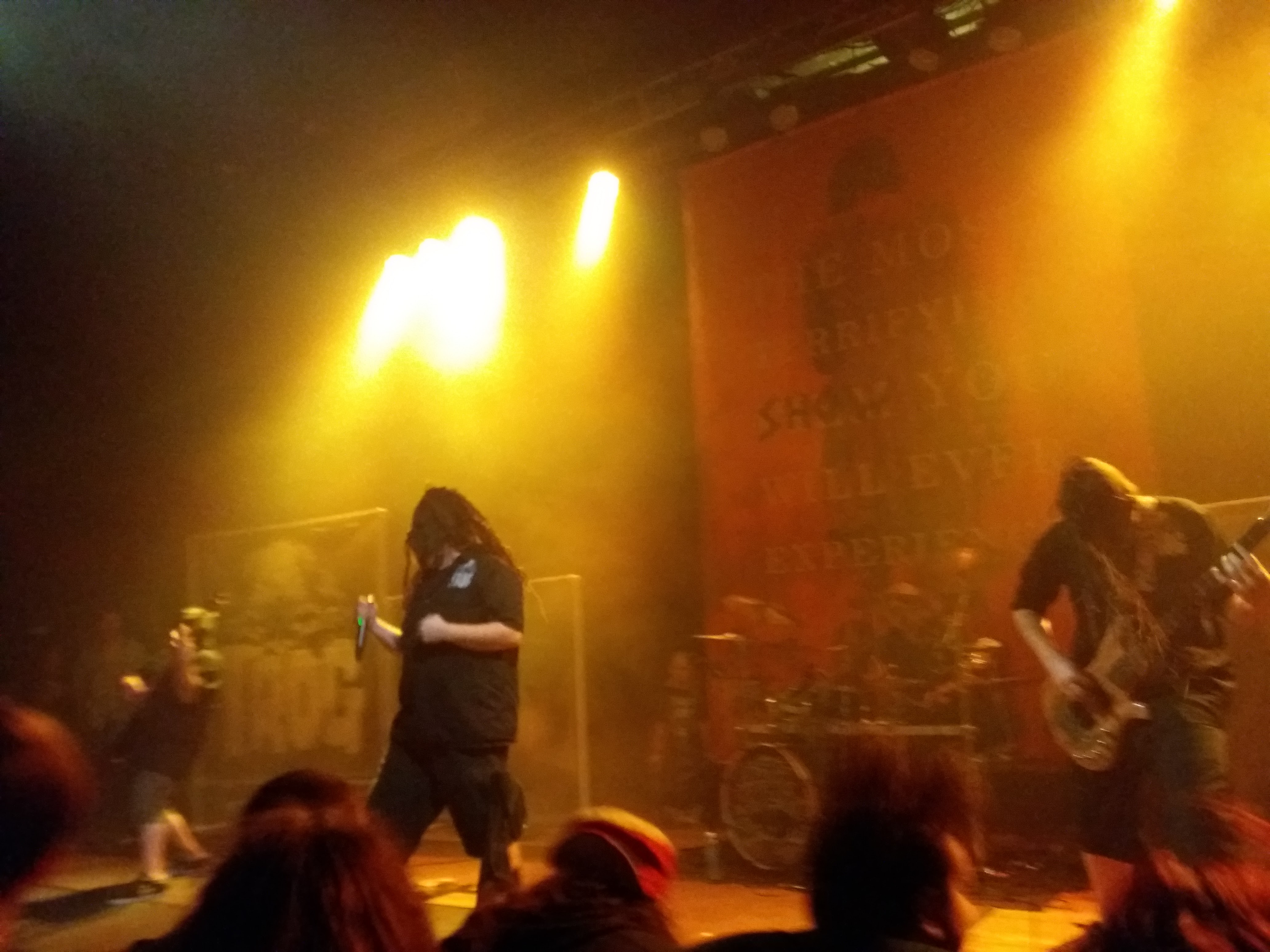
- Troglodyte in 2016.

Background information
- Origin: Independence, Missouri, U.S.
- Genres: Death metal, extreme metal
- Years active: 2005–present
- Labels: noMoreTomorrow
- Members: Jeff Sisson; Jack Riedel; Chris Wilson; Ben Von Scheifelbusch
- Past members: Gary Wray; Jeremy Bruen
- Website: www.neandercore.com

Troglodyte is a death metal band from Independence, Missouri. The band has a horror punk inspired look and writes songs about Bigfoot. They have released four studio albums so far.

== History ==
Formed in early 2005, the band was formed by singer Jeff Sisson, drummer Chris Wilson, and guitarist Jack Riedel. Soon after the creation of the band they were joined by bassist Gary Wray, who formerly played for The Feds and Fire Theory. After Gary Wray's departure from the band in early 2006, bassist Ben Von Schiefelbusch soon joined the band.

Troglodyte released their demo CD 'Anthropoid Effigy Demos' in 2008. Soon they were joined by a second guitar player Jeremy Bruen, who was in the band for about 6 months. During the next few years Troglodyte played numerous shows with national acts such as Testament, Iced Earth, Obituary, Origin, among others.

The band was featured in the No. 111 issue of Rue Morgue Magazine.

In early 2010 they recorded their debut album Welcome to Boggy Creek. Welcome to Boggy Creek was released in May 2011. In October 2012, they released their second album Don't Go In The Woods. January 2016 saw the release of the band's third album Anthropological Curiosities and Unearthed Archaeological Relics. In March 2022, the band released their fourth album, The Hierarchical Ecological Succession: Welcome to the Food Chain.

== Controversy ==
During a show at the Granada Theater in October 2016, the band had a character come on stage holding a "Bigfoot Lives Matter" sign (a parody of the Black Lives Matter movement). After a local media group complained about the sign, the Granada issued a statement about the matter stating the band had apologized and did not mean for the sign to mock the movement.

== Musical style, Image and Influences ==
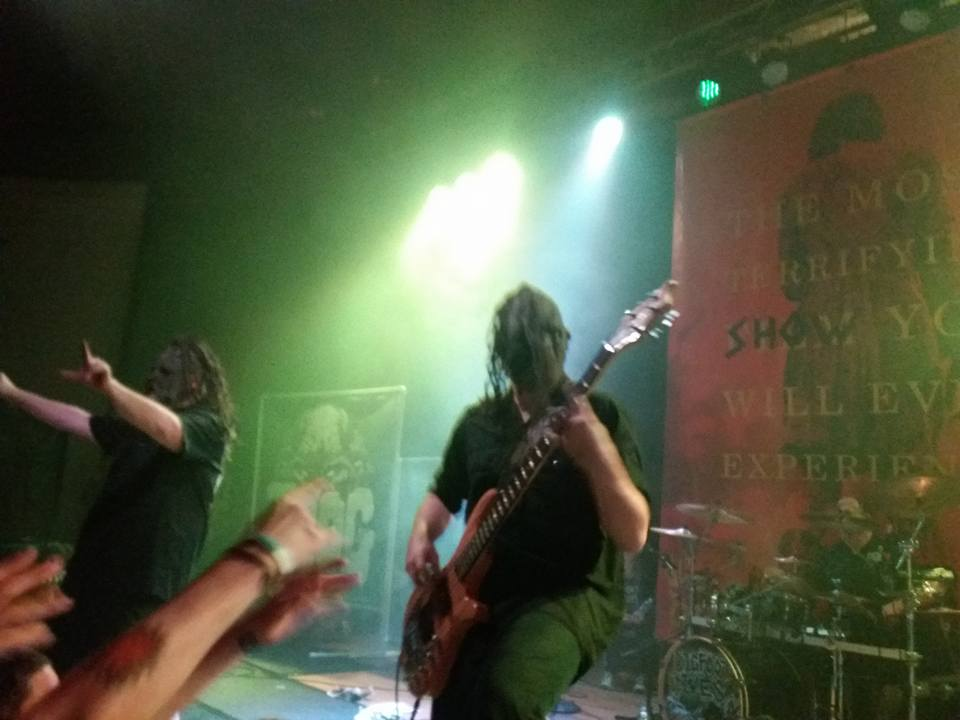
Troglodyte in 2016.

Troglodyte's music is extreme death metal featuring melodic breakdowns. They write songs primarily about Sasquatch, Bigfoot. They have also written songs about Ric Flair and Harry and the Hendersons. Musically, the band is inspired by Carcass, Obituary, Origin and 70s horror films including The Legend of Boggy Creek, The Pit, and Night of the Demon.

the Pitch described the band as having "unrelenting ferocity" and stating they "pummel listeners with speed before unleashing an onslaught of teeth-gnashing slow grooves." The band's style has been described as 'relentless' and 'melodic'. Sisson is quoted about the style of the band as saying "We're an extreme metal band. I mean, we sing in masks about Bigfoot. It's kind of alienating, but people really get behind it."

During shows, a stage hand sprays the crowd with fake blood (usually red and blue Kool-Aid). The band wears masks created by lead singer Jeff Sisson, who is also a movie special effects artist.

== Discography ==
- Welcome to Boggy Creek (2011)
- Don't Go in the Woods (2012)
- Anthropological Curiosities and Unearthed Archaeological Relics (2016)
- The Hierarchical Ecological Succession: Welcome to the Food Chain (2022)
