= Black Magnet =

American industrial metal band

- Origin: Oklahoma City, Oklahoma, U.S.
- Genres: Industrial metal
- Years active: 2018–present
- Label: 20 Buck Spin
- Members: James Hammontree; Ryne Bratcher; Eric Gorman; Jared Branson
- Website: www.blackmagnet.net

Black Magnet is an American industrial metal band formed by multi-instrumentalist James Hammontree in 2018. Based in Oklahoma City, the band started out as Hammontree's solo project before expanding into a four-piece band. Black Magnet released its debut album, Hallucination Scene, via 20 Buck Spin label in 2020.

== History ==
James Hammontree started Black Magnet in 2018, with the demo track "Dreams Beyond Control" being the first song written for the project. The four-song self-titled demo tape was written in a month; following the release of the tape, Hammontree assembled a live band to perform at a three-week tour. The recording for the band's debut album, Hallucination Scene, started soon after the release of the tape: the recording process of the record took a year and a half and Hammontree performed all of the instruments on the album. The record was produced by Sanford Parker. Following the record's completion, Black Magnet signed to the label 20 Buck Spin, which released the record on September 4, 2020.

In December 2021, Black Magnet announced the sophomore record, Body Prophecy, and released the music video for the "Violent Mechanix." During this time, the band became a three piece. In June 2022, the project released the single "Floating in Nothing" from the record. On July 7, 2022, Revolver premiered the second single from the record, "Hermetix," as well its accompanying music video. Produced and engineered by Sanford Parker, the record was released on July 29, 2022 via 20 Buck Spin.

In 2023, the band expanded into a four-piece with the inclusion of drummer Jared Branson. On October 27, 2023, the band released the single, "Birth."

== Musical style ==
Black Magnet's musical style has been described as industrial metal. The tracks on Hallucination Scene was compared to the works of Nine Inch Nails and Godflesh, with Blabbermouth.net critic Dom Lawson describing the record as "a superb example of flagrant and admirable Godflesh worship." According to Todd Manning of No Clean Singing, the band draws from Godflesh and Meathook Seed, as well as EBM sounds of Nine Inch Nails, Ministry, and Skinny Puppy. The band's other influences include Alice in Chains and 1990s Memphis rap.

== Members ==
- James Hammontree – vocals, instruments (2018–present)
- Ryne Bratcher – guitar (2022–present)
- Eric Gorman – synthesizer, vocals (2022–present)
- Jared Branson – drums (2023–present)

== Discography ==
Studio albums

- Hallucination Scene (2020)
- Body Prophecy (2022)
- Megamantra (2025)

EPs

- Black Magnet (2018)

Singles

- "Divination Equipment" (2020)
- "Punishment Map" (2020)
- "Hegemon" (2020)
- "Floating in Nothing" (2022)
- "Hermetix" (2022)
- "Birth" (2023)

Music videos

- "Dreams Beyond Control" (2018)
- "Divination Equipment" (2020)
- "Violent Mechanix" (2021)
- "Floating in Nothing" (2022)
- "Hermetix" (2022)
