= The Silent Wedding =

Greek heavy metal band

- Origin: Greece
- Genres: Heavy metal, progressive metal, power metal, melodic heavy metal
- Years active: 2006–present
- Label: FYB Records
- Members: Marios Karanastasis; Jim Katsaros; Johnny Thermos; Stavros Karlis; Renos Lialioutis
- Past members: Lou Tobi; Alex Gisginis; Jiota; Stelios Soussanidis; George Rhodes; Chris Mavrides; Il James; Tony Nakos

The Silent Wedding is a heavy metal band which was formed in Athens, Greece in 2006. The band is currently signed to FYB Records (Belgium). To date, they have released an EP, a single and three full-length albums. They have played live concerts supporting various bands such as Firewind, Fates Warning, Visions of Atlantis,, Maiden uniteD, and Kamelot.

== History ==
=== Early years (2006–2007) ===
For almost ten years the band was a Greek-speaking heavy rock band with a discography. The band was called "Pyr kai Mania" (English: Fire and Fury). The same members decided to form a metal band with English verse, so in 2006, Jim (guitars) and Mario (vocals) formed The Silent Wedding. The band's name means a "Secret Agreement", combining all the diverse music influences of the band members.

The band started playing live gigs performing their own songs and various covers, sharing the stage with many well-known metal bands and participating in many heavy metal festivals around Greece.

=== The Silent Wedding EP (2008–2009) ===
In 2007 they entered Underground Music Studios in order to arrange record their first songs. In 2008 The Silent Wedding recorded their first EP including four compositions and a live cover of the song "Sleeping in the Fire" by W.A.S.P. The band released the EP in 2008 and received positive feedback from magazines (including Metal Hammer Greece and Rock Hard Greece), radio stations and international webzines. The reviewers described The Silent Wedding as a "Melodic Heavy Metal band with Prog & Power influences".

In 2009 their new song "General Autopsy" was included in the compilation of Rock Hard Magazine "Greek Power Vol.1". The song was also included in the second release of The Silent Wedding EP one year later.

=== Debut album and live gigs (2010–2012) ===
The band started working on its debut album which was completed in 2012. The album, entitled Livin Experiments, was recorded and mixed at Underground Music Studios (Greece) and mastered at Gate Studios (Germany) by Michael Rodenberg (Kamelot, Edguy, Rhapsody of Fire, and others). For the album cover, the band worked with Travis Smith (Nevermore, Iced Earth, Opeth, and others).

Meanwhile, the band kept promoting its work through live shows around Greece in metal festivals (Hellenic Heavy Metal bands fest, Golden Apple Fest, Ayia Napa Youth Fest), sharing the stage with bands like Fates Warning, Firewind, Maiden uniteD, Visions of Atlantis and many more, aiming to gain experience and a stronger fan base. In December 2012, the band supported Maiden uniteD on their mini tour in the Netherlands with Perttu Kivilaakso (Apocalyptica) as a special guest.

=== Livin' Experiments (2013–2014) ===
The Silent Wedding signed a record deal with FYB Records (Belgium) and released their debut album Livin Experiments on 6 April 2013. The album was reviewed by numerous magazines and webzines receiving positive feedback and scoring 8/10 in Metal Hammer Greece. The band's headlining release show in Athens was sold out and Livin' Experiments made it to the "Best Seller Metal CD" list in Public Stores (CD Store chain in Greece and Cyprus).

In September 2013, a second mini tour with Maiden uniteD took place, followed by a Livin Experiments release show in Tilburg, Netherlands. In the same year, Jimmy (guitars) and Johnny (keyboards) joined the band of Eve's Apple (featuring vocalists of Delain, Tristania, Sirenia and many more) for a headlining show at Metal Female Voices Festival in October 2013. The Silent Wedding supported Fates Warning in Athens, Saxon in Thessaloniki, joined Voodoo Six in their European mini tour in 2014 and supported Threshold in their "European Journey" tour for 19 shows.

=== Radio and TV appearances ===
Date	Network / Station	Details
28 April 2012	Atlantis FM 105.2	First radio presentation of "Livin' Experiments" and unplugged live
29 April 2013	MAD TV	Interview and video clip presentation at TV War
31 March 2013	Atlantis FM 105.2	Rock Hard magazine show
8 July 2013	MAD TV	Interview and TV concert at TV WAR
22 July 2013	Sto Kokkino FM 105.5	Metal Hammer Greece show

== Discography ==
- The Silent Wedding EP (2008)
- "General Autopsy" (track #11) in the compilation "Greek Power Vol 1" of Rock Hard magazine (2009)
- Livin Experiments (2013)
- Enigma Eternal (2017)
- Ego Path (2022)

=== "The Silent Wedding" EP (2008) ===
Recorded, Mixed & Mastered at Underground Music Studios (Athens, Greece) by Jim Katsaros.

No.	Title	Length
1.	"I am You"	5:52
2.	"Haley's Eve"	7:16
3.	"A Cry from Within"	6:04
4.	"Shattered Dreams"	9:49
5.	"General Autopsy"	5:48
Total length:		34:47

=== "Livin' Experiments" (2013) ===
It was produced by The Silent Wedding & John Nikolakopoulos, recorded & mixed at Underground Music Studios (Athens, Greece) by Jim Katsaros & Lazaros Karagiannis and mastered at Gate Studios (Germany), by Michael Rodenberg.

No.	Title	Length
1.	"The Return (To Ithaca)"	4:12
2.	"To Them"	5:05
3.	"When Witches Dance"	4:40
4.	"A Cry From Within"	5:05
5.	"The Tale of Strahd"	4:30
6.	"I Am You"	5:49
7.	"Real Temptations"	4:18
8.	"General Autopsy"	5:17
9.	"In Vitro"	6:33
Total length:		45:24

=== Reviews ===
Date	Source	Editor	Rating
10 April 2013	Rock Overdose	Panos Bougalis	90/100
June 2013 (#342)	Metal Hammer & Heavy Metal	Maria Vassiliou	8/10
8 August 2013	Rocking.gr	Theodoris Xouridas	–
13 September 2013	Metal Kaoz	Dimitris Kontogeorgakos	7/10
October 2013	Metal Rules	Ilias Pap	4.0/5
12 October 2013	Sea of Tranquility	Scott Jessup	4/5
16 October 2013	The Forgotten Scroll	Leon Sgourdas	–
21 October 2013	Metal Crypt	Mike Baird	3/5
2013	SawBiz	Kostas Lyros	–
2013	Rock Hard	Fragkiskos Samoilis	7/10

== Videography ==
- To Them (2013)

== Members ==
=== The Silent Wedding ===
- Marios Karanastasis – Vocals (2006–present)
- Jim Katsaros – Guitars (2006–present)
- Johnny Thermos – Keyboards (2009–present)
- Stavros Karlis – Bass (2014–present)
- Renos Lialioutis – Drums (2010–present)

=== Past members ===
- Lou Tobi – Bass (2013)
- Alex Gisginis – Bass (2010–2013)
- Tony Nakos – Guitar (2007–2009)
- Il James – Bass (2006–2010)
- Chris Mavrides – Drums (2006–2010)
- Jiota – Keyboards, Cello (2008–2009)
- George Rodis – Keyboards (2006–2007)
- Stelios Soussan – Drums (2008–2009)
