= Imperial Age (band) =

Russian metal band

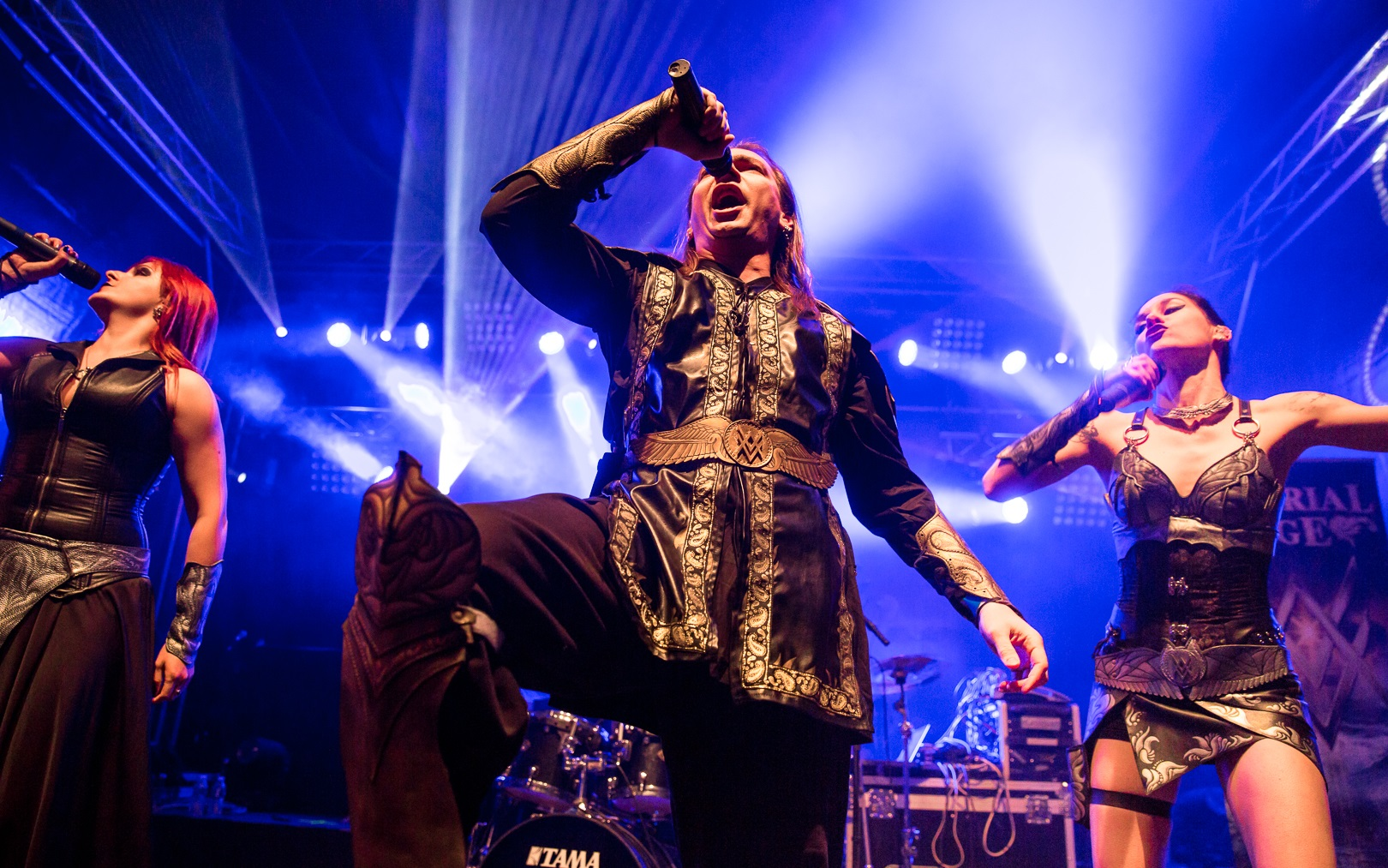
- Imperial Age live at Durbuy Rock Festival, 2018

Background information
- Origin: Moscow, Russia
- Genres: Symphonic power metal
- Years active: 2012–present
- Members: Alexander Osipov; Jane Odintsova; Colin Parks; Dan Quiney; Manuele Di Ascenzo; Daniel Carpenter
- Website: imperial-age.com

Imperial Age is a Russian symphonic power metal band, currently based in Northampton, England. The band was originally founded in 2012 in Moscow, Russia by singers/composers Alexander "Aor" Osipov and Jane "Corn" Odintsova, who relocated to Turkey, and later the United Kingdom, following the Russian invasion of Ukraine. The band consists mostly of British members, and their songs are primarily in English.

In January 2023 Jane and Alexander were endorsed by Arts Council England as Exceptional Talents and applied for UK residency while living in Turkey, where they moved to as soon as the war began. A crowdfunding campaign set up to aid their relocation has gathered £21,419 in pledges from fans. Their residency was granted by the Home Office and they moved to London on 17 April 2023.

Imperial Age has collaborated on multiple occasions with musicians from Therion and Arkona who are featured on all Imperial Age albums. The band was brought to international attention by symphonic metal pioneer Christofer Johnsson, who, after being impressed with their live performance and their cover of Therion's song To Mega Therion in 2014, offered to distribute their music through his label Adulruna Records.

The name of the band has nothing to do with modern states and refers to Atlantis and Hyperborea, from which the musicians derive their inspiration. The lyrics deal with magic and the occult, mainly Hermeticism, Hermetic Qabalah, Runic magic, paganism, bon and the legacy of Ancient civilisations such as Ancient Egypt, Sumer and Mesoamerican civilisations.

== History ==
On 20 November 2012 the band released their debut full-length album Turn The Sun Off!, recorded with many known Russian musicians (Arkona, Epidemia, Stigmatic Chorus, Demons of Guillotine etc.) and received many positive reviews from critics internationally. Initially Aor was the lead singer while Jane played keyboards and did the backing vocals.

In 2013 they toured in Russia as headliners as well as support acts for Epica, Paradise Lost, Finntroll and Oomph!.

In 2014 Alexander and Jane embarked on a month long expedition to Tibet where they filmed a music video for the song Aryavarta at Lake Manasarovar, Mount Everest and Mount Kailash - at altitudes up to 6000 metres above sea level.

Same year, the band continued domestic touring, both as headliners and support act for Tarja Turunen, The 69 Eyes, Tristania and Therion. The latter turned out to be the turning point in their careers. While Imperial Age were playing in front of Therion in St. Petersburg, Christofer Johnsson was siting behind the scenes during the whole set, listening. He was so impressed that he offered the Russians to release their albums through his label Adulruna Records and join Therion on a big European tour. The musicians have been good friends ever since.

Their EP Warrior Race was released in Europe via Adulruna on 1 January 2016. The record included 3 new songs, a Therion cover (which Christofer called "the best Therion cover" he had ever heard) and 5 songs from the first album re-recorded with a new lead singer - Alexandra Sidorova. A European tour of 21 concerts in 13 countries as support for Therion followed in January - February 2016.

After the tour Alexandra left the band for personal reasons and was replaced with Anna "Kiara" Moiseeva. After that, a second European tour of 18 concerts in 11 countries followed in November 2016 - this time as support for Orphaned Land. At the end of the tour Imperial Age successfully played their first headliner shows in Europe - in Manchester (UK) and Zaragoza (Spain).

Their second full-length album titled The Legacy of Atlantis was released on 1 February 2018. The album is a metal opera with various characters telling an occult story about a magician from Atlantis who is reborn in medieval Italy. Jane has left the keyboards to fully concentrate on singing, and the role of Cardinal Gregory was sung by Thomas Vikström. Bass and rhythm guitars were recorded by Therion bassist Nalle Pahlsson, solo guitar - by Christian Vidal. The record was mixed and mastered by Sergei Lazar of Arkona. The opera features the P.I. Tchaikovsky Moscow State Conservatory Chamber Choir conducted by Taras Yasenkov.

From January to April 2018 they embarked on their longest tour which included 59 concerts in 26 EU and non-EU countries - this time, as mid-act with Therion. The tour was also the biggest tour in Therion's career.

In June the band signed contract with Japanese label Rubicon Music for three releases in Japan.

In January–March 2019 the band had a big European headliner tour and in December 2019 released the video on "The Legacy of Atlantis" song, which was 100% funded by their fans and reached almost 1 million views in its first 4 months

On April 25, 2020, Imperial Age streamed a 180-minute online concert from locked-down Moscow and achieved ground-breaking success with 38,000 people streaming the live concert from all 7 continents, including Antarctica. The band received US$11,470 in donations during the show and the subsequent DVD grossed another US$20,000.

During the crowdfunding campaign of July–August 2021 the band received US$65,000 from fans in order to record the new album New World. The release date was set for 5 August 2022.

On 26 December 2021 the entire New World album was played live as part of the "Live New World" online show with a chamber orchestra and choir. This concert was watched online worldwide and received US$21,000 in donations from fans.

On 24 February 2022, following the start of the Russo-Ukrainian War, the band published an anti-war statement. On 7 March 2022, it was announced that four members had relocated to Turkey.

On 18 March 2022 "The Way is the Aim" - the first single and music video from the "New World" album - was released, followed by "Legend of the Free" and "The Wheel"

On 10 July 2022 it was announced that Max Talion and Paul "Vredes" Maryashin had left the band.

In August 2022 they were replaced for the European tour with Manuele Di Ascenzo (Italy) and Jens Hendriks (Netherlands).

On 27 August 2022 the album "New World" was released and gained positive reviews in the European and American media.

In September 2022 Imperial Age played 21 shows in Netherlands, Belgium, France, Germany, Spain, Portugal, Italy and Switzerland as part of their "Live New World" tour in support of the New World album. After the tour it was announced that Manuele Di Ascenzo has become a permanent member of the band.

On 16 December the official music video "The Wheel" was published on YouTube. On 18 January the official music video "Windborn" was published on YouTube.

January 2023 saw the UK tour - which had been delayed since 2020 due to the Covid pandemic and the Russian invasion of Ukraine - finally happening, with Imperial Age playing in Glasgow, Newcastle, Manchester, Birmingham and London for the first time since 2019. Guitar was handled by Ryan Thomson (UK). Since Belf had issues with his UK visa, and could not join the tour, he was replaced with Tim Schaling (Netherlands) on bass.

"Shackles of Gold" - the fifth music video from the "New World" album - was released on 23 February 2023.

On 17 April 2023 Jane and Aor landed in London and became UK residents. They subsequently settled in Northamptonshire. A homecoming acoustic concert in London with online livestream was announced for 16 August to celebrate their move, with physical tickets selling out within a week.

On 6 July the band announced the Lost Worlds Unleashed Tour 2023 spanning Germany, France, Switzerland, Netherlands and the UK.

On 23 December 2023, Anna and Belf have also left the band and the remaining band members have decided to go on only with two vocalists.

== Band members ==
Current

- Alexander "Aor" Osipov – vocals (2012–present)
- Jane "Corn" Odintsova – vocals, growls (2012–present)
- Manuele Di Ascenzo – drums, percussion (2022–present)
- Daniel Carpenter – lead guitar (2024–present)
- Dan "Beardy" Quiney – bass (2024–present)
- Colin Parks – rhythm guitar (2025–present)

Former

- Igor "Kiv" Korolev – rhythm guitar (2014–2015)
- Dmitry Pyshechkin – bass (2012–2015)
- Dmitry Kovalev – drums, percussion (2013–2015)
- Sergey Mordashov – lead guitar (2013–2014)
- Alexandra Sidorova – soprano vocals (2014–2016)
- Alexandr Strelnikov – lead guitar (2014–2017)
- Maxim Novikov – rhythm guitar (2015–2017)
- Max Talion – drums, percussion (2017–2022)
- Paul "Vredes" Maryashin – lead guitar (2017–2022)
- Anna "Kiara" Moiseeva – soprano vocals (2016–2023)
- Dmitry "Belf" Safronov – lead guitar (2012–2013), bass, unclean vocals (2017–2023)
- Jonathan Hawkins – rhythm guitar (2024–2025)

Session

- Jens Hendriks – guitars (2022)
- Kublai Kapsalis – guitars (2022–2023)
- Tim Schaling – bass (2023)
- Ryan Thomson – guitars (2023)

== Discography ==
Studio albums

- Turn the Sun Off! (2012)
- The Legacy of Atlantis (2018)
- New World (2022)

EP's

- Warrior Race (EP, 2016)

Singles

- Demons Are a Girl's Best Friend (single, 2021) - Powerwolf's song cover
- The Way Is the Aim (single, 2022)
- Legend of the Free (single, 2022)
- Songs of Power (2022)

Live

- Live in Wroclaw (2019)
- Live on Earth: The Online Lockdown Concert (DVD & Double CD, 2020)
- Live New World (2022)
