= Somali Yacht Club =

Ukrainian rock band

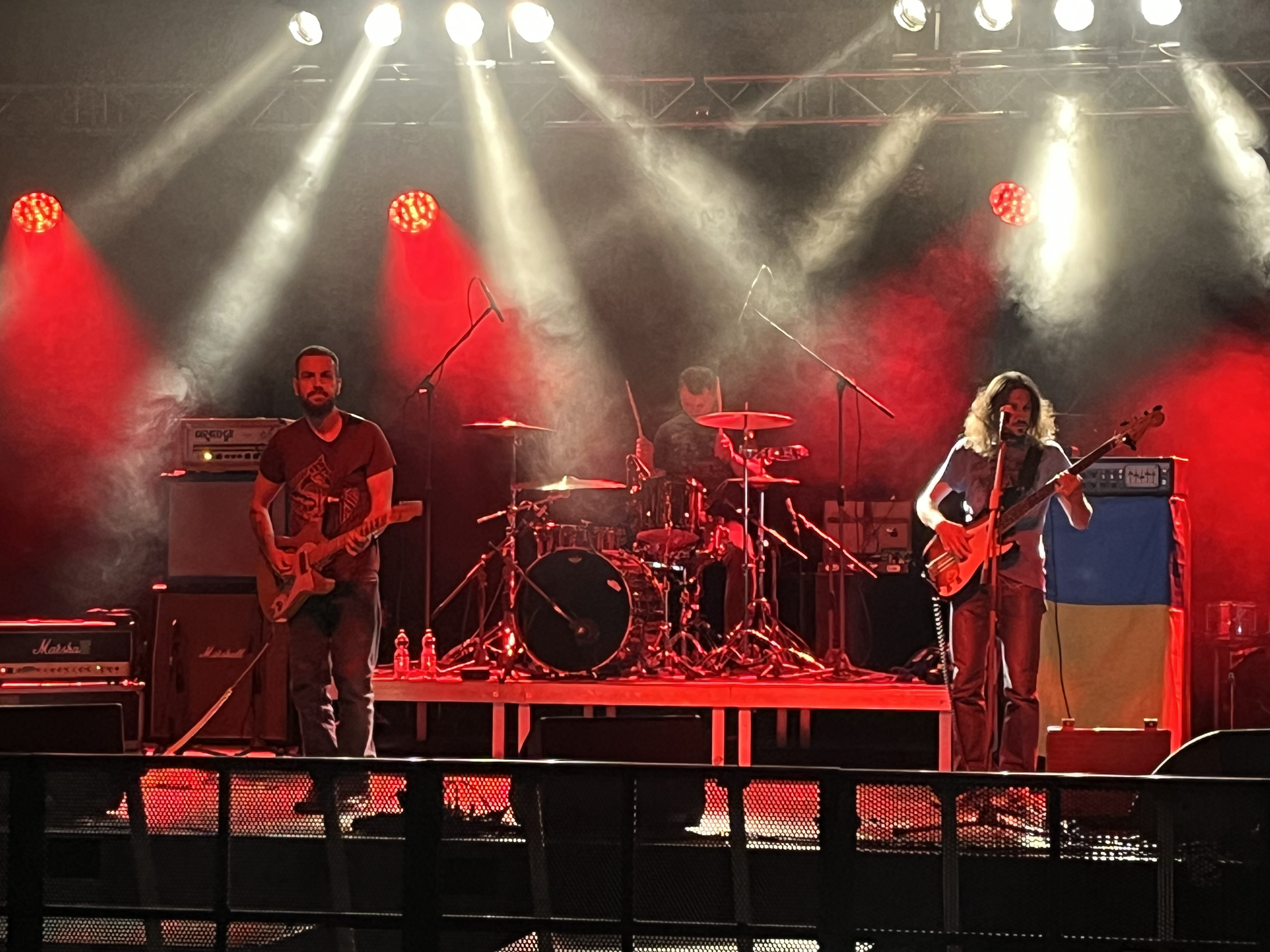

Background information
- Origin: Lviv, Ukraine
- Genres: Stoner rock; Psychedelic; Shoegaze; Post-metal
- Years active: 2010–present
- Labels: Bilocation Records, Jenny Records, Robustfellow Productions
- Members: Mezk Erei AKA Ihor Pryshliak; Artur Savluk; Lesyk Mahula

Somali Yacht Club is a Ukrainian rock band from Lviv formed in 2010.

== Biography ==
Forming as a jam band in 2010 in the city of Lviv, Somali Yacht Club eventually evolved into a main band for the 3 members. Self-releasing their first EP, Sandsongs in 2011, they signed on to Bilocation Records to release their first LP, The Sun in 2014. Their sound has been favorably compared to the likes of Pelican, Tool, and Kyuss.

== Members ==
- Ihor Pryshliak – guitar, vocals
- Artem Bemba – bass
- Lesyk Mahula – drums

== Discography ==
=== Albums ===
- The Sun (2014, Bilocation Records, Robustfellow Productions)
- The Sea (2018, Bilocation Records, Robustfellow Productions)
- The Sun +1 (2018, Robustfellow Productions)
- The Space (2022, Season of Mist)

=== EPs ===
- Sandsongs (2011, self-released)
- Desert Walls (2013, self-released)
- Sun's Eyes (2015, self-released)
