= Claustrofobia (band) =

Brazilian death/thrash metal band

- Origin: Leme, São Paulo, Brazil
- Genres: Thrash metal; death metal
- Years active: 1993–present
- Labels: Metal Assault Records
- Members: Marcus D'angelo; Rafael Yamada; Caio D'angelo
- Past members: Tueio; Ricardo; Marcelo; Ivan; Alexandre de Orio; Douglas Prado; Daniel Bonfogo
- Website: www.claustrofobia.com.br

Claustrofobia is a Brazilian death/thrash metal band from São Paulo, formed in 1993. The band is considered one of the seminal underground extreme metal bands in Brazil, with fans around the world, particularly in United States and Eastern Europe.

== History ==
The band started in 1993 in Leme, São Paulo. In the years the band participated in the underground scene, becoming one of the most important death/thrash metal bands in Brazil. The band has toured through South America and Europe, sharing the stage with Iron Maiden, Slayer, Soulfly, Destruction, In Flames, Brujeria, Napalm Death, Vader, Krisiun, Helmet, Hate Eternal, Ratos de Porão, Paul Di'Anno, Anthrax, Testament, Sepultura and Kreator.

The band did a cross-country U.S. tour with Master in the summer of 2019 before heading back to Brazil to open for Slayer's last show in Brazil on 2 October 2019.

Two days later, they went on to play the Palco Sunset stage at Rock in Rio, in Rio de Janeiro, on 4 October 2019.

== Discography ==
=== Studio albums ===
- Claustrofobia (2000)
- Thrasher (2002)
- Fulminant (2005)
- I See Red (2009)
- Peste (2011) (re-released in 2014 with 3 bonus tracks)
- Download Hatred (2016)
- Unleeched (2022)

=== Demos ===
- Saint War (1995)
- Manifestações (1996)

=== EP ===
- Swamp Loco (2018)

=== DVD ===
In March 2015, the band released their first DVD, titled "Visceral". The DVD contains live shows and a documentary about the 20-year history of the band.
