= 2019 in heavy metal music =

This is a timeline documenting the events of heavy metal in the year 2019.

== Bands formed ==
- BPMD
- Kill the Lights
- Left to Suffer
- Nemophila
- Sanguisugabogg
- Vexed
- Zulu

== Bands disbanded ==
- Black Moth
- Brain Drill
- Children of Bodom
- Continents
- Dirge
- Huldre
- Katedra
- Nitro
- Prophets of Rage
- Slayer
- Unsane

== Bands reformed ==
- Agent Steel
- Alcatrazz
- Brand New Sin (one-off show)
- Cadaver
- Dirty Looks
- Dismember
- Katatonia
- Mercyful Fate
- Methods of Mayhem
- Mr. Bungle
- Rage Against the Machine
- Sev (one-off show)
- Sister Sin
- Sylosis
- Vio-lence

== Events ==
- After 51 years together, UFO embarks on their final tour, dubbed "The Last Orders", with founding member Phil Mogg, who plans to retire from the band.
- After 46 years together, Kiss embarks on yet another farewell tour, dubbed "One Last Kiss: End of the Road World Tour".
- After 45 years together, Krokus embarks on their farewell tour this year.
- Slayer is expected to wrap up their farewell tour this year in November.
- Megadeth launches its first-ever MegaCruise, which is set to take place in the Pacific Ocean from October 13‒19.
- Accept announces that Martin Motnik is replacing original bassist Peter Baltes, who left the band the previous November.
- Janet Gardner of Vixen leaves to focus on her solo career. She is replaced by Femme Fatale's Lorraine Lewis.
- Longtime percussionist Chris Fehn of Slipknot departs from the band. This comes after Fehn filed a lawsuit against the band citing withheld payments.

== Deaths ==
Date	Artist	Age	Role/Band	Cause
January 1	Shane Bisnett	31	Bassist/Ice Nine Kills	Undisclosed cause
January 16	Brian Velasco	41	Drummer/Razorback	Suicide
January 19	Ted McKenna	68	Former Drummer/Michael Schenker Group and Ian Gillan	Hemorrhage after surgery
January 25	Bruce Corbitt	56	Vocalist/Rigor Mortis	Esophageal cancer
January 28	Paul Whaley	72	Drummer/Blue Cheer	Heart failure
March 17	Bernie Tormé	66	Guitarist/Ozzy Osbourne and Gillan	Post-flu complications
March 17	Yuya Uchida	79	Percussionist and Producer/Flower Travellin' Band	Pneumonia
April 13	Paul Raymond	73	Keyboardist and Guitarist/UFO and Michael Schenker Group	Heart attack
April 26	Phil McCormack	58	Vocalist/Molly Hatchet	Undisclosed cause
May 21	Larry Carroll	64	Artist, Cover Designer/Slayer	Undisclosed cause
May 21	Rosław Szaybo	85	Artist, Cover Designer/Judas Priest	Lung cancer
June 8	Andre Matos	47	Vocalist/Angra, Shaman, and Viper	Heart attack
June 13	Nature Ganganbaigal	29	Vocalist and Instrumentalist/Tengger Cavalry	Undisclosed cause
August 4	Paul Finnie	44	Bassist/Power Quest	Heart attack
August 5	Lizzie Grey	60	Vocalist and Guitarist/Spiders & Snakes and London	Lewy body disease
September 16	Mick Schauer	46	Keyboardist/Clutch	Cancer
September 18	Tony Mills	57	Vocalist/TNT and Shy	Pancreatic cancer
September 19	Larry Wallis	70	Guitarist/Motörhead	Undisclosed cause
September 23	Richard Brunelle	55	Guitarist/Morbid Angel	Undisclosed cause
October 2	Morten Stützer	57	Guitarist and Bassist/Artillery	Undisclosed cause
October 21	Peter Hobbs	58	Vocalist and Guitarist/Hobbs' Angel of Death	Undisclosed cause
November 4	Timi "Grabber" Hansen	61	Bassist/Mercyful Fate and King Diamond	Cancer
December 25	Stephen Kasner	49	Artist and Cover Designer/Forbidden, Marduk, Rotting Christ, and Sunn O)))	Undisclosed cause
December 28	Elijah Nelson	40	Bassist/Black Breath	Undisclosed cause

== Albums released ==
=== January ===
Day	Artist	Album
4	Callejon	Hartgeld im Club
4	Festerday	Iihtallan
4	John Garcia and the Band of Gold	John Garcia and the Band of Gold
4	Legion of the Damned	Slaves of the Shadow Realm
4	Mark Deutrom	The Blue Bird
4	Rosetta	Sower of Wind (EP)
9	Krallice	Wolf (EP)
11	Born of Osiris	The Simulation
11	Jinjer	Micro (EP)
11	Soilwork	Verkligheten
18	A Pale Horse Named Death	When the World Becomes Undone
18	Arch Enemy	Covered in Blood (compilation album)
18	Cane Hill	Kill the Sun (EP)
18	Dawn of Ashes	The Crypt Injection II (Non Serviam)
18	Dust Bolt	Trapped in Chaos
18	Flotsam and Jetsam	The End of Chaos
18	Lemuria	The Hysterical Hunt
18	Malevolent Creation	The 13th Beast
18	Oomph!	Ritual
18	Papa Roach	Who Do You Trust?
18	Raven	Screaming Murder Death from Above: Live in Aalborg (live album)
18	Rifftera	Across the Acheron
18	Thunder	Please Remain Seated
21	Oblivion	Oblivion
25	Ancient Bards	Origine (The Black Crystal Sword Saga Part 2)
25	Bring Me the Horizon	Amo
25	Carnal Forge	Gun to Mouth Salvation
25	Corroded	Bitter
25	Desecravity	Anathema
25	Evergrey	The Atlantic
25	Hecate Enthroned	Embrace of the Godless Aeon
25	Incite	Built to Destroy
25	Jetboy	Born to Fly
25	Kane Roberts	The New Normal
25	King 810	Suicide King
25	King Diamond	Songs for the Dead Live (live album)
25	Quiet Riot	One Night in Milan (live album)
25	Starbreaker	Dysphoria
25	Swallow the Sun	When a Shadow Is Forced into the Light
26	Panopticon	The Crescendo of Dusk (EP)

=== February ===
Day	Artist	Album
1	Astronoid	Astronoid
1	Gideon	No Love/No One (EP)
1	Metallica	Helping Hands... Live & Acoustic at the Masonic (live album)
1	Soen	Lotus
1	Within Temptation	Resist
8	Beast in Black	From Hell with Love
8	Downfall of Gaia	Ethic of Radical Finitude
8	Herman Frank	Fight the Fear
8	Zao	Decoding the Möbius Strip (EP)
15	Avantasia	Moonglow
15	Born from Pain	True Love
15	Rotting Christ	The Heretics
22	Attila	Villain
22	Candlemass	The Door to Doom
22	Delain	Hunter's Moon
22	Dream Theater	Distance over Time
22	Imperia	Flames of Eternity
22	Last in Line	II
22	The Moth Gatherer	Esoteric Oppression
22	Opprobrium	The Fallen Entities
22	Overkill	The Wings of War
22	Rhapsody of Fire	The Eighth Mountain
22	Rock Goddess	This Time
22	Tora Tora	Bastards of Beale

=== March ===
Day	Artist	Album
1	Darkwater	Human
1	Demon Hunter	Peace
1	Demon Hunter	War
1	In Flames	I, the Mask
1	Mark Morton	Anesthetic
1	Mike Tramp	Stray from the Flock
1	Queensrÿche	The Verdict
1	While She Sleeps	So What?
8	Brymir	Wings of Fire
8	Children of Bodom	Hexed
8	Doro	Backstage to Heaven (EP)
8	Iron Fire	Beyond the Void
8	Iron Savior	Kill or Get Killed
8	Mägo de Oz	Ira Dei
8	Misery Index	Rituals of Power
8	The Raven Age	Conspiracy
8	Tesla	Shock
8	Týr	Hel
15	Any Given Day	Overpower
15	Fallujah	Undying Light
20	Tengger Cavalry	Northern Memory
22	Battle Beast	No More Hollywood Endings
22	Bloodbound	Rise of the Dragon Empire
22	Burning Rain	Face the Music
22	Cellar Darling	The Spell
22	The End Machine	The End Machine
22	Megadeth	Warheads on Foreheads (compilation album)
22	Stahlmann	Kinder der Sehnsucht
22	Waylander	Eriú's Wheel
22	Zeal & Ardor	Live in London (live album)
29	Anthem	Nucleus (compilation album)
29	Devin Townsend	Empath
29	Forever Still	Breathe in Colours
29	I Prevail	Trauma
29	L.A. Guns	The Devil You Know
29	Manowar	The Final Battle I (EP)
29	Nightrage	Wolf to Man
29	Okilly Dokilly	Howdilly Twodilly
29	Whitechapel	The Valley

=== April ===
Day	Artist	Album
5	Brant Bjork	Jacoozi
5	Cirith Gorgor	Sovereign
5	Eluveitie	Ategnatos
5	Enterprise Earth	Luciferous
5	Exumer	Hostile Defiance
5	Necrodeath	Defragments of Insanity
5	Periphery	Periphery IV: Hail Stan
5	Sworn Enemy	Gamechanger
12	Andy Black	The Ghost of Ohio
12	Big Business	The Beast You Are
12	Black River	Humanoid
12	Blackguard	Storm
12	Diesear	BloodRed Inferno
12	Hamferð	Ódn (EP)
12	Posthum	Like Wildfire
19	After the Burial	Evergreen
19	Allegaeon	Apoptosis
19	Alpha Wolf	Fault (EP)
19	Grand Magus	Wolf God
19	Jordan Rudess	Wired for Madness
19	L'Acéphale	L'Acéphale
19	Per Wiberg	Head Without Eye
26	The Damned Things	High Crimes
26	Dub Trio	The Shape of Dub to Come
26	Enforcer	Zenith
26	Hardline	Life
26	Helheim	Rignir
26	Helms Alee	Noctiluca
26	King Gizzard & the Lizard Wizard	Fishing for Fishies
26	Månegarm	Fornaldarsagorna
26	Marissa Nadler & Stephen Brodsky	Droneflower (collaboration album)
26	New Years Day	Unbreakable
26	Nine Shrines	Retribution Therapy
26	Paragon	Controlled Demolition
26	Steel Prophet	The God Machine
26	Sunn O)))	Life Metal
26	Vaura	Sables
28	Archivist	Triumvirate

=== May ===
Day	Artist	Album
3	Amon Amarth	Berserker
3	Kampfar	Ofidians Manifest
3	L7	Scatter the Rats
3	Myrath	Shehili
3	Origin	Abiogenesis – A Coming into Existence (compilation album)
3	Ringworm	Death Becomes My Voice
10	Abnormality	Sociopathic Constructs
10	Aphyxion	Void
10	Arch/Matheos	Winter Ethereal
10	Danny Worsnop	Shades of Blue
10	Extrema	Headbanging Forever
10	Handful of Hate	Adversus
10	Idle Hands	Mana
10	Possessed	Revelations of Oblivion
10	Whitesnake	Flesh & Blood
11	Ulver	Drone Activity
17	Artificial Language	Now We Sleep
17	Avatar	The King Live in Paris (live album)
17	Bethlehem	Lebe Dich Leer
17	Black Flame	Necrogenesis: Chants from the Grave
17	Crazy Lixx	Forever Wild
17	Full of Hell	Weeping Choir
17	October Tide	In Splendor Below
17	Pythia	The Solace of Ancient Earth
17	Rammstein	Untitled
17	Saint Vitus	Saint Vitus
17	Savage Messiah	Demons
17	Starkill	Gravity
20	Paleface Swiss	Chapter 2: Witch King (EP)
24	Deathspell Omega	The Furnaces of Palingenesia
24	Destrage	The Chosen One
24	Diamond Head	The Coffin Train
24	Earth	Full Upon Her Burning Lips
24	Emil Bulls	Mixtape (covers album)
24	Fleshgod Apocalypse	Veleno
24	Marko Hietala	Mustan Sydämen Rovio
24	Misþyrming	Algleymi
24	Siamese	Super Human
24	Soto	Origami
24	Stormlord	Far
27	Batushka	Панихида
31	D–A–D	A Prayer for the Loud
31	Darkthrone	Old Star
31	Death Angel	Humanicide
31	Gaahls Wyrd	GastiR – Ghosts Invited
31	Gloryhammer	Legends from Beyond the Galactic Terrorvortex
31	Janet Gardner	Your Place in the Sun
31	Krypts	Cadaver Circulation
31	Paul Masvidal	Mythical (EP)
31	Texas Hippie Coalition	High in the Saddle
31	Vader	Thy Messenger (EP)

=== June ===
Day	Artist	Album
7	Axel Rudi Pell	XXX Anniversary Live (live album)
7	Cave In	Final Transmission
7	Combichrist	One Fire
7	Diviner	Realms of Time
7	Enthroned	Cold Black Suns
7	Firespawn	Abominate
7	Majestica	Above the Sky
7	Motionless in White	Disguise
7	Nebula	Holy Shit
7	Pelican	Nighttime Stories
7	Roadsaw	Tinnitus the Night
7	The Rods	Brotherhood of Metal
7	Tanzwut	Semannsgarn
7	Upon a Burning Body	Southern Hostility
7	Warrior Soul	Rock 'n' Roll Disease
7	Xentrix	Bury the Pain
14	Baroness	Gold & Grey
14	Beheaded	Only Death Can Save You
14	Hate	Auric Gates of Veles
14	Ingested	The Call of the Void (EP)
14	Kat	Without Looking Back
14	The Lord Weird Slough Feg	New Organon
14	Neal Morse	Jesus Christ the Exorcist
14	Suicide Silence	Rare Ass Shit (compilation album)
14	Thank You Scientist	Terraformer
14	Timo Tolkki's Avalon	Return to Eden
21	Hed PE	Stampede
21	Kryptos	Afterburner
21	The Meads of Asphodel	Running Out of Time Doing Nothing
21	Memoriam	Requiem for Mankind
21	Tony Mills	Beyond the Law
28	Beastwars	IV
28	Bloodred Hourglass	Godsend
28	Bloody Hammers	The Summoning
28	Cro-Mags	Don't Give In (EP)
28	Generation Axe	The Guitars That Destroyed the World (Live in China) (live album)
28	He Is Legend	White Bat
28	Majesty	Legends
28	Nocturnal Breed	We Only Came for the Violence

=== July ===
Day	Artist	Album
5	3Teeth	Metawar
5	Abbath	Outstrider
5	Brand of Sacrifice	God Hand
5	Bullet	Live (live album)
5	Ellefson	Sleeping Giants
5	Immortal Bird	Thrive on Neglect
5	Turilli / Lione Rhapsody	Zero Gravity (Rebirth and Evolution)
10	Gyze	Asian Chaos
12	311	Voyager
12	Batushka	Hospodi
12	Cerberus (MX)	Fire!
12	Disentomb	The Decaying Light
12	Elder	The Gold & Silver Sessions (EP)
12	Oh, Sleeper	Bloodied / Unbowed
12	Ribspreader	Crawl and Slither
12	Suicide Silence	Live & Mental (live album)
12	Torche	Admission
19	Cancer	Ballcutter (EP)
19	Crown the Empire	Sudden Sky
19	Flaw	Vol IV: Because of the Brave
19	Jeromes Dream	Untitled
19	Sabaton	The Great War
19	Scott Stapp	The Space Between the Shadows
19	Sum 41	Order in Decline
19	Through Fire	All Animal
19	Wormed	Metaportal (EP)
19	Wreck and Reference	Absolute Still Life
26	All Out War	Crawl Among the Filth
26	Hatriot	From Days Unto Darkness
26	Lordi	Recordead Live – Sextourcism in Z7 (DVD)
26	Thy Art Is Murder	Human Target
26	The Trigger	The Time of Miracles
26	Wolves at the Gate	Eclipse
31	John 5 and the Creatures	Invasion
31	Yeos	Azteca's Revenge

=== August ===
Day	Artist	Album
2	Bad Omens	Finding God Before God Finds Me
2	Carnifex	World War X
2	Finsterforst	Zerfall
2	Narnia	From Darkness to Light
2	Northlane	Alien
2	NorthTale	Welcome to Paradise
2	Russian Circles	Blood Year
2	Sacrilege	The Court of the Insane
2	Skillet	Victorious
2	Volbeat	Rewind, Replay, Rebound
9	The Contortionist	Our Bones (EP)
9	Destruction	Born to Perish
9	Pathology	Reborn to Kill
9	Richard Henshall	The Cocoon
9	Slipknot	We Are Not Your Kind
9	Spread Eagle	Subway to the Stars
9	Suicidal Angels	Years of Aggression
9	Zombie Apocalypse	Life Without Pain is a Fucking Fantasy (EP)
16	Capture	Lost Control
16	Devourment	Obscene Majesty
16	Diocletian	Among the Flames of a Burning God
16	HammerFall	Dominion
16	Killswitch Engage	Atonement
16	King Gizzard & the Lizard Wizard	Infest the Rats' Nest
16	Twilight Force	Dawn of the Dragonstar
23	Equilibrium	Renegades
23	Freedom Call	M.E.T.A.L.
23	Illdisposed	Reveal Your Soul for the Dead
23	Isole	Dystopia
23	It Prevails	A Life Worth Living (EP)
23	Knocked Loose	A Different Shade of Blue
23	Nemesea	White Flag
23	Sacred Reich	Awakening
28	Coldrain	The Side Effects
30	Elvenking	Reader of the Runes – Divination
30	Entombed A.D.	Bowels of Earth
30	Necronautical	Apotheosis
30	Sons of Apollo	Live with the Plovdiv Psychotic Symphony (live album)
30	Tarja	In the Raw
30	Tool	Fear Inoculum
30	Visions of Atlantis	Wanderers
30	Wage War	Pressure

=== September ===
Day	Artist	Album
2	Mgła	Age of Excuse
6	Disillusion	The Liberation
6	Kayo Dot	Blasphemy
6	Sleeping with Sirens	How It Feels to Be Lost
6	Sonata Arctica	Talviyö
6	Transport League	A Million Volt Scream
11	Infant Annihilator	The Battle of Yaldabaoth
13	The 69 Eyes	West End
13	Alice Cooper	Breadcrumbs (EP)
13	Beartooth	The Blackbird Session (EP)
13	Betraying the Martyrs	Rapture
13	Blood Red Throne	Fit to Kill
13	Chelsea Wolfe	Birth of Violence
13	Cold	The Things We Can't Stop
13	Crashdïet	Rust
13	Dawn of Destiny	The Beast Inside
13	Devilish Impressions	Postmortem Whispering Crows (EP)
13	The Hu	The Gereg
13	Korn	The Nothing
13	Puddle of Mudd	Welcome to Galvania
13	Sinner	Santa Muerte
13	Tom Keifer	Rise
13	Visceral Disgorge	Slithering Evisceration
13	Void of Vision	Hyperdaze
13	War of Ages	Void
13	Winterfylleth	The Siege of Mercia: Live at Bloodstock 2017 (live album)
20	The Agonist	Orphans
20	As I Lay Dying	Shaped by Fire
20	Blut Aus Nord	Hallucinogen
20	Cult of Luna	A Dawn to Fear
20	Exhorder	Mourn the Southern Skies
20	Kobra and the Lotus	Evolution
20	Michael Schenker Fest	Revelation
20	The Number Twelve Looks Like You	Wild Gods
22	Arallu	En Olam
26	Behemoth	O Pentagram Ignis (EP)
27	Acid Reign	The Age of Entitlement
27	Borknagar	True North
27	Car Bomb	Mordial
27	Corky Laing	Toledo Sessions
27	Dayseeker	Sleeptalk
27	DragonForce	Extreme Power Metal
27	Excalion	Emotions
27	Ghost	Seven Inches of Satanic Panic (EP)
27	Hellyeah	Welcome Home
27	IQ	Resistance
27	KMFDM	Paradise
27	Netherbird	Into the Vast Uncharted
27	Of Mice & Men	Earthandsky
27	Opeth	In Cauda Venenum
27	SeeYouSpaceCowboy	The Correlation Between Entrance and Exit Wounds
27	Sifting	The Infinite Loop
27	Steel Panther	Heavy Metal Rules
27	Thunder	The Greatest Hits (compilation album)
27	Wednesday 13	Necrophaze
27	Wind Rose	Wintersaga

=== October ===
Day	Artist	Album
4	The Darkness	Easter Is Cancelled
4	Dysrhythmia	Terminal Threshold
4	Exhumed	Horror
4	Gatecreeper	Deserted
4	Helloween	United Alive (live album)
4	In Mourning	Garden of Storms
4	Insomnium	Heart Like a Grave
4	Issues	Beautiful Oblivion
4	Nightstalker	Great Hallucinations
4	Paul Masvidal	Human (EP)
4	Toxic Holocaust	Primal Future: 2019
4	We Lost the Sea	Triumph & Disaster
4	William DuVall	One Alone
9	Vinnie Moore	Soul Shifter
11	Babymetal	Metal Galaxy
11	Bury Your Dead	We Are Bury Your Dead (EP)
11	The Devil Wears Prada	The Act
11	Eclipse	Paradigm
11	Eye of the Enemy	Titan
11	Gideon	Out of Control
11	Grim Reaper	At the Gates
11	Lacuna Coil	Black Anima
11	Life of Agony	The Sound of Scars
11	Michael Sweet	Ten
11	Municipal Waste	The Last Rager (EP)
11	Profanatica	Rotting Incarnation of God
11	Toothgrinder	I AM
11	Unleash the Archers	Explorers (EP)
11	Vanden Plas	The Ghost Xperiment – Awakening
11	Varials	In Darkness
18	1349	The Infernal Pathway
18	Alter Bridge	Walk the Sky
18	I Declare War	Downcast (EP)
18	Infected Rain	Endorphin
18	Konkhra	Alpha and the Omega
18	Lionize	Panic Attack!
18	Michael Monroe	One Man Gang
18	Ray Alder	What the Water Wants
18	Santa Cruz	Katharsis
18	Uneven Structure	Paragon
25	Alcest	Spiritual Instinct
25	Bad Wolves	N.A.T.I.O.N.
25	Botanist	Ecosystem
25	Edenbridge	Dynamind
25	Exmortus	Legions of the Undead (EP)
25	Fit for an Autopsy	The Sea of Tragic Beasts
25	Hour of Penance	Misotheism
25	Jinjer	Macro
25	Leprous	Pitfalls
25	Mayhem	Daemon
25	Norma Jean	All Hail
25	North of South	The Dogma and the Outsider (EP)
25	Ogre	Thrice as Strong
25	Orodruin	Ruins of Eternity
25	Phil Campbell	Old Lions Still Roar
25	Puppy	III (EP)
25	Rings of Saturn	Gidim
25	Saint Asonia	Flawed Design
25	Skinlab	Venomous
25	Sunn O)))	Pyroclasts
25	Vision Divine	When All the Heroes Are Dead
30	Nikki Stringfield	Harmonies for the Haunted (EP)

=== November ===
Day	Artist	Album
1	Angel Witch	Angel of Light
1	Cannabis Corpse	Nug So Vile
1	Counterparts	Nothing Left to Love
1	Decadence	Six Tape
1	Eskimo Callboy	Rehab
1	Fire From the Gods	American Sun
1	Nile	Vile Nilotic Rites
1	Novembers Doom	Nephilim Grove
1	Paganizer	The Tower of the Morbid
1	Stray from the Path	Internal Atomics
1	Voyager	Colours in the Sun
8	Agnostic Front	Get Loud!
8	Blind Guardian	Legacy of the Dark Lands
8	The Dark Element	Songs the Night Sings
8	Esoteric	A Pyrrhic Existence
8	Otherwise	Defy
8	Pretty Maids	Undress Your Madness
8	Quiet Riot	Hollywood Cowboys
8	Vicarius	Vicarivs
8	Wolfbrigade	The Enemy: Reality
11	Shark Island	Bloodline
15	Abigail Williams	Walk Beyond the Dark
15	Bombus	Vulture Culture
15	Cyhra	No Halos in Hell
15	Despised Icon	Purgatory
15	Ragnarok	Non Debellicata
15	Spoil Engine	Renaissence Noire
22	Avatarium	The Fire I Long For
22	Blood Incantation	Hidden History of the Human Race
22	Child Bite	Blow Off the Omens
22	Crystal Viper	Tales of Fire and Ice
22	Dog Fashion Disco	Tres Pendejos
22	Hypno5e	A Distant (Dark) Source
22	Leaves' Eyes	Black Butterfly (EP)
22	Lindemann	F & M
22	Magic Kingdom	MetAlmighty
22	Obsequiae	The Palms of Sorrowed Kings
22	Signum Regis	The Seal of a New World
22	Sodom	Out of the Frontline Trench (EP)
22	Tygers of Pan Tang	Ritual
22	What We Do in Secret	Repose
29	Black Veil Brides	The Night (EP)
29	Bölzer	Lese Majesty (EP)
29	Cattle Decapitation	Death Atlas
29	Fleshcrawl	Into the Catacombs of Flesh
29	Prong	Age of Defiance (EP)
29	Stormwarrior	Norsemen

=== December ===
Day	Artist	Album
6	Blitzkrieg	Loud and Proud (EP)
6	Cro-Mags	From the Grave (EP)
6	Fen	The Dead Light
6	Human Fortress	Reign of Gold
6	The Murder of My Sweet	Brave Tin World
6	Nightwish	Decades: Live in Buenos Aires (live album)
6	The Old Dead Tree	The End (EP)
6	Running Wild	Crossing the Blades (EP)
6	Scissorfight	Doomus Abruptus, Vol. 1
11	Band-Maid	Conqueror
13	Jasta	The Lost Chapters – Volume 2
13	Nothing Left	Disconnected
13	Officium Triste	The Death of Gaia
13	Oni	Alone (EP)
13	Sid Wilson	Sexcapades of the Hopeless Robotic, Vol. 2
13	Stone Sour	Hello, You Bastards: Live in Reno (live album)
26	The Acacia Strain	It Comes in Waves
27	Bring Me the Horizon	Music to Listen to~Dance to~Blaze to~Pray to~Feed to~Sleep to~Talk to~Grind to~Trip to~Breathe to~Help to~Hurt to~Scroll to~Roll to~Love to~Hate to~Learn Too~Plot to~Play to~Be to~Feel to~Breed to~Sweat to~Dream to~Hide to~Live to~Die to~Go To (EP)

Preceded by 2018	Heavy Metal Timeline; 2019	Succeeded by 2020
