= Crown the Empire discography =

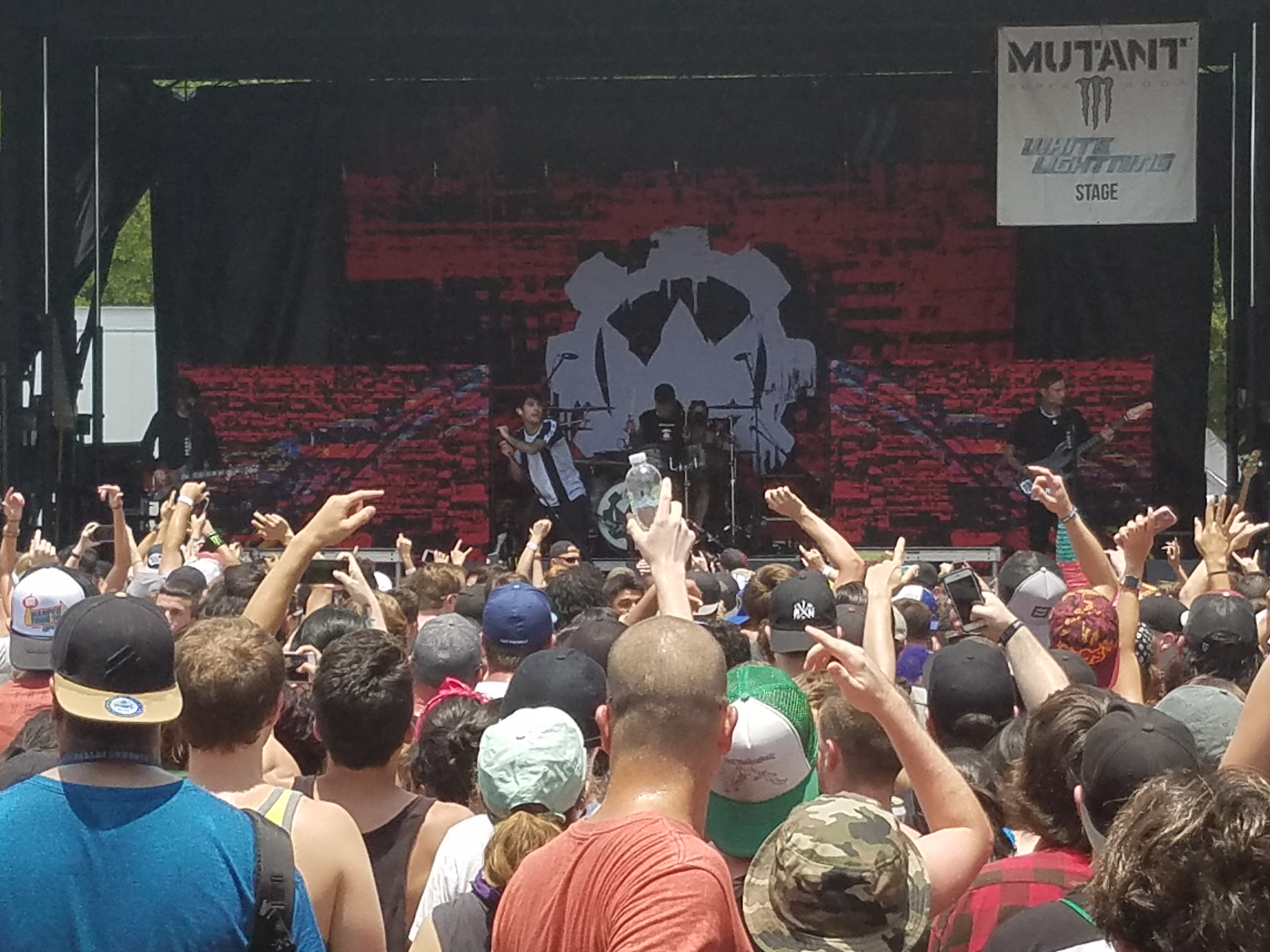
- Studio albums: 5
- EPs: 1
- Compilation albums: 1
- Singles: 31
- Music videos: 26

The discography of American metalcore band Crown the Empire consists of five studio albums, one compilation album, one EP, 31 singles and 26 music videos. Crown the Empire released their debut album titled The Fallout in November 2012 and charted in the US, peaking at 1 on the Top Heatseekers albums. In July 2014, they released The Resistance: Rise of The Runaways, which peaked at 1 on both the Top Independent Albums, Top Hard Rock Albums and was their first release that charted abroad, peaking at 184 in the UK. Their third album Retrograde was released on July 22, 2016. Their fourth album, Sudden Sky, was released on July 19, 2019. Their most recent album, Dogma, was released on April 28, 2023.

== Albums ==
=== Studio albums ===
Title	Album details	Peak chart positions							
Title	Album details	US	US Indie	US Hard Rock	US Heat	US Rock	AUS	UK	UK Rock
The Fallout	Released: November 19, 2012; Label: Rise; Format: CD, vinyl, digital	—	8	7	1	37	—	—	—
The Resistance: Rise of The Runaways	Released: July 22, 2014; Label: Rise; Format: CD, vinyl, digital	7	1	1	—	1	—	184	16
Retrograde	Released: July 22, 2016; Label: Rise; Format: CD, vinyl, digital	15	1	1	—	1	53	—	12
Sudden Sky	Released: July 19, 2019; Label: Rise; Format: CD, vinyl, digital	190	8	13	—	37	— (Note: Sudden Sky did not enter the ARIA Albums Chart, but peaked at number 45 on the ARIA Digital Album Chart.)	—	—
Dogma	Released: April 28, 2023; Label: Rise; Format: CD, vinyl, digital	—	—	—	—	—	—	—	—

=== Compilation albums ===
Title	Album details
07102010	Released: July 10, 2020; Label: Rise; Format: Vinyl, digital

== Extended plays ==
Title	Extended play details
Limitless	Released: November 29, 2011; Label: Self-released; Format: Digital

== Singles ==
Title	Year	Album
"Breaking Point"	2010	Non-album single
"Wake Me Up"	2010	Non-album single
"Forever" (Drake cover)	2010	Non-album single
"Wake Me Up"	2011	Limitless
"Let It Snow"	2011	Non-album single
"Voices"	2012	Limitless
"Moves Like Jagger" (Maroon 5 cover)	2012	Non-album single
"Makeshift Chemistry"	2012	The Fallout
"Payphone" (Maroon 5 cover)	2012	Punk Goes Pop Volume 5
"There Will Be No Christmas"	2013	Punk Goes Christmas
"Limitless" (re-recorded)	2013	The Fallout (Deluxe Reissue)
"Initiation"	2014	The Resistance: Rise of The Runaways
"Rise of the Runaways"	2014	The Resistance: Rise of The Runaways
"Bloodline"	2014	The Resistance: Rise of The Runaways
"Burn" (Ellie Goulding cover)	2014	Punk Goes Pop Vol. 6
"Prisoners of War"	2015	The Resistance: Deluxe Edition
"Welcome to the Black Parade" (My Chemical Romance cover)	2016	Rock Sound Presents: The Black Parade
"Zero"	2016	Retrograde
"Weight of the World"	2016	Retrograde
"Hologram"	2016	Retrograde
"20/20"	2018	Sudden Sky
"What I Am"	2018	Sudden Sky
"Sudden Sky"	2019	Sudden Sky
"MZRY"	2019	Sudden Sky
"Blurry (Out of Place)"	2019	Sudden Sky
"In Another Life" (featuring Courtney LaPlante of Spiritbox)	2021	Dogma
"Dancing with the Dead"	2021	Dogma
"Johnny's Revenge" (new version; featuring Spencer Charnas, Dave Stephens and Craig Owens)	2022	Non-album single
"Immortalize"	2022	Dogma
"Dogma"	2023	Dogma
"Black Sheep"	2023	Dogma
"Raw"	2026	data-sort-value="" style="background: #DDF; color:black; vertical-align: middle; text-align: center; " class="skin-invert no table-no2" | TBA
"Violet"	2026	data-sort-value="" style="background: #DDF; color:black; vertical-align: middle; text-align: center; " class="skin-invert no table-no2" | TBA

=== Featured singles ===
Title	Year	Original artist	Album
"Outcasts" (featuring Andy Leo)	2013	Palisades	Outcasts
"We Come in Numbers" (featuring David Escamilla)	2013	It Lives, It Breathes	We Come in Numbers
"The Let Down" (featuring Andy Leo)	2014	One Shot Thrill	Life Lessons
"NightLife" (featuring Andy Leo and David Escamilla)	2014	Light Up the Sky	NightLife
"Backpack (Cover)" (featuring David Escamilla)	2015	Brandon Crabtree	Non-album single
"Liberate" (featuring David Escamilla)	2017	Patriots	Stand Off
"Above the Flames" (featuring David Escamilla)	2017	I, the Enemy	Self Worth
"Blood" (featuring Andy Leo)	2019	Selfish Things	Logos

== Music videos ==
Title	Year	Album	Director	Type	Link
"Wake Me Up" (acoustic)	2010	Non-album single	Sam Link^{α}	Performance	
"Voices"	2011	Limitless	Sam Link^{α}	Narrative	
"Johnny Ringo"	2012	Limitless	Sam Link^{α}	Performance	
"Oh, Catastrophe"	2012	The Fallout	Sam Link^{α}	Narrative	
"The Fallout"	2012	The Fallout	Sam Link^{α}	Narrative	
"Memories of a Broken Heart"	2013	The Fallout	Dillon Novak	Performance	
"Machines"	2014	The Resistance: Rise of The Runaways	Garrett Danz^{α}	Narrative	
"Bloodline"	2014	The Resistance: Rise of The Runaways	Graham Fielder	Performance	
"Initiation"	2014	The Resistance: Rise of The Runaways	Unknown	Live performance	
"Burn"	2015	Punk Goes Pop Vol. 6	Unknown	Narrative	
"Satellites" / "Rise of the Runaways"	2015	The Resistance: Rise of The Runaways	Garrett Danz	Narrative	
"Prisoners of War"	2015	The Resistance: Deluxe Edition	Jensen Noen	Performance	
"Cross Our Bones"	2015	The Resistance: Deluxe Edition	Unknown	Performance	
"Zero"	2016	Retrograde	Samuel Shapiro	Performance	
"Hologram"	2016	Retrograde	Samuel Halleen	Narrative	
"20/20"	2018	Sudden Sky	Max Moore^{α}	Narrative	
"What I Am"	2018	Sudden Sky	Max Moore^{α}	Performance	
"Sudden Sky"	2019	Sudden Sky	Zev Deans^{α}	Performance	
"MZRY"	2019	Sudden Sky	Marco Pavone^{α}	Narrative	
"Blurry (Out of Place)"	2020	Sudden Sky	Jensen Noen^{α}	Performance	
"Red Pills"	2020	Sudden Sky	Sam Shapiro^{α}	Performance	
"In Another Life"	2021	Dogma	Orie McGinness^{α}	Performance	
"Dancing with the Dead"	2021	Dogma	Vicente Cordero^{α}	Narrative	
"Immortalize"	2022	Dogma	Orie McGinness	Narrative	
"Dogma"	2023	Dogma	Vicente Cordero^{α}	Narrative	
"Superstar"	2023	Dogma	Joe Mischo	Narrative	
"Raw"	2026		B.K. Barone^{α}	Narrative	
"Violet"	2026		B.K. Barone^{α}	Narrative	
^α= Are referenced in the description of the given video link.
