= 07102010 =

Compilation album by Crown the Empire
- Released: July 10, 2020
- Genre: Pop rock; alternative rock; acoustic rock
- Length: 38:35
- Label: Rise
- Producer: Josh Strock; Munk

Crown the Empire chronology
Sudden Sky (2019)	07102010 (2020)	Dogma (2023)

07102010 is the first compilation album by American metalcore band Crown the Empire. The album was released on July 10, 2020 through Rise Records. It was produced by Josh Strock and Munk. The album is a compilation of acoustic versions of songs from their previous discography, made to commemorate the 10-year anniversary of the post-hardcore band's first show at Compass Church in Colleyville, Texas.

== Background and recording ==
The album includes a new track, "Everything Breaks", which was written during the Sudden Sky album sessions, recorded as a demo at that time, and released by singer Andy Leo in 2018. When asked about the inspiration for the acoustic album, the band states that they "wanted to look back and strip down songs across all of [their] albums as a thank you to everyone who has been along for the journey so far."

== Release and promotion ==
The album was released on July 10, 2020, through Rise Records, within only two days of being announced. It was initially released only for streaming platforms and as a digital download. It was then released in vinyl format for Record Store Day (November 27, 2020).

Eight of the acoustic tracks from the album were played on a Twitch livestream on July 18, 2020.

== Critical reception ==
Professional ratings
Review scores
Source	Rating
BurnYourEars	7/10
Dead Press!	6/10

The German webzine BurnYourEars gave the album a rating of 7/10. The album is described as having a colorful mix of songs and being nostalgic in tone. Although the songs are stripped down from their aggressive metal origins, they're still just as energetic and emotional, and the dark lyrics stand out in the acoustic format. Although the album is described as not seeming superfluous or boring, the bonus track ("Everything Breaks") is said to be melancholic but without quite providing the desired climax.

The album was also reviewed by Dead Press! on July 13, 2020. In the review, the album is described as "neutral-toned and awash with maturity" but "alive with a new spirit and indicative of [Crown the Empire]'s fondness of what they have created thus far." The album is praised as being tasteful, delicate, and cozy, and the choice of songs is called meticulous and solemn. The band is described as "thriving in both the depths of metalcore and the crisp vulnerability of acoustic tracks" as "a sign of true versatility." The review, however, cautions that it "brings little new to the table" despite being so pleasing to listen to.

== Track listing ==
All lyrics are written by Crown the Empire, except where noted; all music is composed by Crown the Empire.

07102010 track listing
No.	Title	Writer(s)	Original album	Length
1.	"Aftermath" (acoustic)	Drew Fulk, Scott Stevens, Josh Strock	Retrograde	3:44
2.	"Cross Our Bones" (acoustic)	Brendan Barone, Fulk, Strock	The Resistance: Rise of The Runaways	3:28
3.	"Blurry (Out of Place)" (acoustic)	Fulk, Micah Premnath, Strock	Sudden Sky	3:12
4.	"Hologram" (acoustic)	Fulk, Strock	Retrograde	3:36
5.	"Memories of a Broken Heart" (acoustic)	Barone, David Escamilla, Bennett Vogelman	The Fallout	2:51
6.	"Johnny Ringo" (acoustic)	Barone, Escamilla, Vogelman	Limitless	3:49
7.	"Voices" (acoustic)	Barone, Escamilla, Vogelman	Limitless	3:30
8.	"What I Am" (acoustic)	Fulk, Strock, Frederik Thaae	Sudden Sky	3:18
9.	"Second Thoughts" (acoustic)	Barone	The Resistance: Rise of The Runaways	3:50
10.	"MZRY" (acoustic)	Fulk, Strock	Sudden Sky	3:35
11.	"Everything Breaks" (bonus track)	Thaae		3:42
Total length:				38:35

== Personnel ==
Crown the Empire

- Andrew "Andy Leo" Rockhold – lead vocals, keyboards, programming, composition
- Brandon Hoover – guitars, vocals, composition
- Hayden Tree – bass, vocals, composition
- Brent Taddie – drums, percussion, composition

Additional personnel

- Josh A. Strock – production, arranging, composition
- Munk – production, engineering
- Kris Crummett and Drew Sullivan – engineering
- Drew Fulk and Scott C. Stevens – arranging, composition
- Stevie Aiello, Brendan K. Barone, David Escamilla, Micah Rayan Premnath, Frederik Thaae and Bennett Vogelman – composition
