= Death of the Cosmic =

EP by Hinayana
- Released: August 20, 2020
- Recorded: 2019–2020
- Genre: Melodic death metal; death-doom; doom metal
- Length: 23:34
- Label: Napalm

Hinayana chronology
Order Divine (2018)	Death of the Cosmic (2020)	Shatter and Fall (2023)

Death of the Cosmic is an EP by American melodic death-doom band Hinayana, released on August 28, 2020. It is their first release under Napalm Records and with their current bassist, Matt Bius. The EP was primarily self-produced by the band, with mixing/drum recording from Kevin Butler and mastering by Swallow the Sun's Juho Raiha. Guitars and bass were written and recorded by Casey Hurd, and Erik Shtaygrud wrote and recorded the solos on Death of the Cosmic and Cold Conception. The EP features guest appearances by late Tengger Cavalry frontman Nature Ganganbaigal (Cold Conception) and Hanging Garden's Toni Toivonen (In Sacred Delusion). Death of the Cosmic EP features 5 songs, including a re-recording of Pitch Black Noise. A music video for Cold Conception was released on July 7, 2020, and immediately received positive feedback. The video concept was developed by Hurd, and was directed and edited by Chris Thompson.

Hurd explains that the EP "is based on the severed connection between ourselves and the cosmic, spiritual force in the universe and the loss of hope for the cold, modern world man has created in nature’s place. Sonically, we wanted to make something that was beautiful but crushing at the same time, demonstrated in the title track of this EP, which in concept might be viewed as a microcosm of the whole EP itself. Something we tried to do was stray away from some of the more cliché elements of melodic death metal and instead focus on what is the very root/core of Hinayana and what gives the band its own sound". The album art was done by Travis Smith.

== Track listing ==
Track listing for Death of the Cosmic
No.	Title	Length
1	"Death of the Cosmic"	5:23
2	"Cold Conception" (featuring Nature Ganganbaigal)	5:06
3	"Yet Here I Wait Forever"	2:41
4.	"In Sacred Delusion" (featuring Toni Toivonen)	5:18
5.	"Pitch Black Noise"	5:10
