= The World Is My Enemy Now =

Studio album by Upon a Burning Body
- Released: August 12, 2014
- Recorded: Sumerian Studios, Los Angeles, CA
- Genre: Metalcore
- Length: 40:48
- Label: Sumerian
- Producer: Will Putney

Upon a Burning Body chronology
Red. White. Green. (2012)	The World Is My Enemy Now (2014)	Straight from the Barrio (2016)

Singles from The World Is My Enemy Now
- 1. "Scars" Released: July 3, 2014; 2. "Red Razor Wrists" Released: July 5, 2014; 3. "Bring the Rain" Released: July 18, 2014

The World Is My Enemy Now is the third studio album by American metalcore band Upon a Burning Body. The album was released on August 12, 2014 through Sumerian Records. The album was produced by Will Putney, who produced their two albums, The World Is Ours and Red. White. Green.

The album's lyrics have been described as being "not safe for work".

== Controversy ==
In July 2014 the band received negative attention for a publicity stunt to promote this album, where the band reported that frontman Danny Leal was missing. The band later posted the album cover for the album which was still unreleased, which showed Leal tied up in the background, thus revealing the whole angle to be a joke. Since then, the band refused to apologize.

== Track listing ==
All lyrics are written by Upon a Burning Body; all music is composed by Upon a Burning Body.

No.	Title	Length
1.	"Red Razor Wrists"	3:21
2.	"Scars"	3:45
3.	"Fountain of Wishes"	3:32
4.	"Bring the Rain"	4:33
5.	"Pledge Your Allegiance"	3:19
6.	"The New Breed"	3:06
7.	"A Toda Madrè ò un Desmadrè" (instrumental)	1:47
8.	"Judgement"	4:02
9.	"The World Is My Enemy Now"	3:09
10.	"Blood, Sweat and Tears" (featuring Matt Heafy of Trivium)	3:23
11.	"I've Earned My Time" (featuring Tyler Smith of The Word Alive)	3:07
12.	"Middle Finger to the World"	3:44
Total length:		40:48

== Personnel ==
Upon a Burning Body

- Danny Leal - vocals
- Sal Dominguez - lead guitar
- Ruben Alvarez - rhythm guitar
- Rey Martinez - bass
- Ramon "The Lord Cocos" Villarreal - drums

Additional musicians

- Matt Heafy (Trivium) – guest vocals on "Blood, Sweat and Tears"
- Tyler Smith (The Word Alive) – guest vocals on "I've Earned My Time"

Production

- Will Putney – production, engineering, mixing, mastering
- Randy Leboeuf, Tom Smith Jr., Alberto De Icaza – additional editing and engineering
- Ash Avildsen – vocal production and additional lyrics on "Scars", "Fountain of Wishes", "Bring the Rain" and "Judgement", additional vocal production
- Shawn Keith – additional vocal production, A&R
- Lorenzo Antonucci – additional vocal engineering at Sumerian Studios, Los Angeles, CA
- Danny Leal - lyrics
- Ruben Alvarez - lyrics

Management

- Outerloop Management – management
- JJ Cassiere (Circle Talent North America) and Jim Moorewood (Eccentric Gent Organization Ltd.) – booking agents

Artwork

- Daniel McBride (McBride Design) – album layout and design, art direction/concept
- Nick Walters – additional vocal production, A&R, art direction/concept
- Josh Huskin – photography
