= Paparokades =

Christian rock band

Paparokades (In English: Priest Rockers) was a Greek Christian rock band founded by Father Nektarios Moulatsiotis.

== History ==
In the early 1990s father Nektarios Moulatsiotis was having trouble keeping up the camping areas that were in the monastery. Along with Christodoulos, they decided to create a rock band named "Paparokades" so they could bring the popularity of the camping areas of the monastery once had.

Members of the band included Giannis Papanikolaou, Xristoforos, Father Moulatsiotis, and 2 other priests. The first song of the band was "I Learnt To Live Freely" which was sung by Papanikolaou and was a resistance message to people, in order for them to leave the system and learn to live freely in villages.

The appearance of the band was controversial for the Church of Greece as what these priests did was apparently "too anarchist". However the song gave popularity to the camping areas of the monastery and the songs continued with the next one being "The Microchip" which was about the microchip that was going to be mandatory in the future and the mark of the beast.

The next song was called "Babylon" which was about the Fall of Babylon, after that Moulatsiotis and his team of priests went in ANT1 and said that the September 11 attacks were caused by demons who drove the planes towards the Twin towers. They claimed that there were no passengers or terrorists but that was regarded by the Channel as "Extreme".

Paparokades made many other Christian rock and heavy metal songs until they decided to try songs with neoclassic/retro-like music. Songs with that music included: "What Has This World For Me?", "My Friend I'm Not Okay", "I Love You Greece", "The World Changes" and the "Against Your Order". The band was very popular until 2006 where the Greek government announced that a Biometric ID will become mandatory by the end of 2011. As people thought that was the number of the beast, people started violently protesting against the Biometric ID. These protests included a farmer who was also protesting to intentionally get in his panel truck and collide with a van that was delivering Biometric IDs to the factories that were going to develop them. The reason this farmer did that was to stop the IDs from getting developed. That was somehow traced back to the band, so Paparokades received a lawsuit. This resulted in them disbanding. Papanikolaou became a rock singer in Diviner several years later.

Despite this, the camping areas are still open today.
