= SFTB =

SFTB may refer to:

- Solution-focused brief therapy, a goal-directed collaborative approach to psychotherapeutic change
- Soundtracks for the Blind, 1996 album by Swans
- "Started from the Bottom", 2013 single by Drake
- Straight from the Barrio, 2016 album by Upon a Burning Body
- Submerged floating tube bridge, tunnel that floats in water
