= Implicit Obedience =

Studio album by Desecravity
- Released: January 24, 2012
- Recorded: January 2010, Tokyo, Japan
- Genres: Technical death metal, death metal
- Length: 32:30
- Label: Willowtip Records
- Producer: Desecravity

Desecravity chronology
Implicit Obedience (2012)	Orphic Signs (2014)

Professional ratings
Review scores
Source	Rating
Metal Review	8.5/10

Implicit Obedience is the debut album by the technical death metal band Desecravity. It was mixed and mastered at Mana Recording Studios by Erik Rutan (Hate Eternal) in June 2011 and was released on January 24, 2010, on Willowtip Records.

== Track listing ==
No.	Title	Lyrics	Music	Length
1.	"Into the Unknown"	instrumental	Yuichi Kudo	01:46
2.	"Enthralled in Decimation"	Yuichi Kudo & Yujiro Suzuki	Yuichi Kudo & Yujiro Suzuki	03:04
3.	"Immortals' Warfare"	Yuichi Kudo & Yujiro Suzuki	Yuichi Kudo	03:28
4.	"Demonize the Old Enemy"	Yuichi Kudo & Yujiro Suzuki	Yuichi Kudo	05:31
5.	"Hades"	Yuichi Kudo & Yujiro Suzuki	Yuichi Kudo	04:11
6.	"Condemnation"	Yuichi Kudo & Yujiro Suzuki	Yuichi Kudo	03:16
7.	"The Collapse of Religion"	Yuichi Kudo & Yujiro Suzuki	Yuichi Kudo & Yujiro Suzuki	04:02
8.	"Extinction with Hatred"	Yuichi Kudo & Yujiro Suzuki	Yuichi Kudo	03:48
9.	"Dark Dimension"	Yuichi Kudo & Yujiro Suzuki	Yuichi Kudo	03:24
Total length:				32:30

== Credits ==
- Yuichi Kudo - Drums
- Yujiro Suzuki - Vocals/Guitar
- Keisuke Takagi - Guitar
- Toshihiro Inagaki - Bass
