= Hinayana (band) =

American metal band

- Origin: Austin, Texas, US
- Genres: Melodic death metal, doom metal, death-doom, death metal
- Years active: 2014–present
- Label: Napalm
- Members: Casey Hurd; Erik Shtaygrud; Daniel Vieira; Michael Anstice; Matt Bius
- Past members: Lee Martsching; Joseph Maniscalco
- Website: hinayana.bandcamp.com

Hinayana (sometimes stylized as HINAYANA) is an American melodic death metal/doom metal band from Austin, Texas.

== History ==
Hinayana was originally formed as a one-man project in 2014 by vocalist/guitarist Casey Hurd. The word "Hinayana" is a Sanskrit word, meaning the "smaller vehicle" or "lesser path" to enlightenment. In the context of the band name, it was chosen to represent the inner struggle and suffering one must conquer to find the truth in every aspect of life, nature, the esoteric, and the universe – seeing both the beautiful and not-so-beautiful sides of it all.

Eventually rounding out a full line-up, Hinayana self-released their debut full-length album, Order Divine, in 2018. Hinayana has shared the stage with acts such as Eluveitie, Ensiferum, Septicflesh, Carach Angren, Mors Principium Est, Alestorm, Gloryhammer, and others. In October 2018, Hinayana entered into a re-release and distribution deal with Black Lion Records (Sweden).

The band began working on material for their EP Death of the Cosmic in 2019 and signed with Napalm Records in 2020. Hinayana released the EP under the record label on August 28, 2020. The first single and music video from the EP, "Cold Conception", was released on July 7, 2020.

Their second full-length album Shatter and Fall was released on November 10, 2023.

== Members ==
Current members

- Casey Hurd – vocals/guitar
- Erik Shtaygrud – guitar
- Daniel Vieira – drums
- Michael Anstice – bass guitar

Past members

- Lee Martsching – bass guitar
- Joseph Maniscalco – bass guitar
- Matt Bius – bass guitar

== Discography ==
Studio albums

- Order Divine (2018)
- Shatter and Fall (2023)

EPs

- Death of the Cosmic (2020)

Demo albums

- Endless (2014)
