= Blood of the Bull =

Studio album by Upon a Burning Body
- Released: December 5, 2025
- Recorded: 2024–2025
- Genre: Groove metal; metalcore; deathcore
- Length: 33:30

Upon a Burning Body chronology
Fury (2022)	Blood of the Bull (2025)

Singles from Blood of the Bull
- 1. "Daywalker" Released: August 1, 2025

Professional ratings
Review scores
Source	Rating
Blabbermouth.net	6/10
Dead Rhetoric	8/10

Blood of the Bull is the seventh studio album by American metalcore band Upon a Burning Body. The album was released independently on December 5, 2025. It is their last album with drummer Tito Felix, who departed from the band a month before the album's release.

== Track listing ==
No.	Title	Length
1.	"Sangre del Toro"	1:33
2.	"Hand of God"	2:54
3.	"Killshot"	2:33
4.	"Daywalker"	3:42
5.	"Vultures"	3:28
6.	"Another Ghost"	3:54
7.	"Dragged Through Glass"	3:00
8.	"Living in a Matrix"	3:34
9.	"Curse Breaker"	2:48
10.	"An Insatiable Hunger"	2:50
11.	"Reckless Love"	3:14
Total length:		33:30
