= Shatter and Fall =

Studio album by Hinayana
- Released: November 10, 2023
- Genre: Melodic death metal; death metal; doom metal
- Length: 49:50
- Label: Napalm

Hinayana chronology
Death of the Cosmic (2020)	Shatter and Fall (2023)

Shatter and Fall is the second full-length studio album by American melodic death-doom band Hinayana, released on November 10, 2023, under Napalm Records. The album was produced and recorded by founder Casey Hurd and Kevin Butler, with mastering by Dan Swanö. The album art was done by Travis Smith. The album features guest appearances by Vincent Jackson Jones (Æther Realm) on "Mind Is a Shadow" and Tuomas Saukkonen (Wolfheart, Before the Dawn) on "A Tide Unturning". Saukkonen had previously directed a music video for the re-recording of "Pitch Black Noise" from their 2020 EP Death of the Cosmic. The video was released on July 26, 2023, less than four months before the release of Shatter and Fall. Hinayana embarked on a European tour with Saukkonen's bands in the month of the album's release.

Music videos were released for the songs "Reverse the Code", "Triptych Visions", and "A Tide Unturning".

== Track listing ==
Track listing for Shatter and Fall
No.	Title	Length
1	"Slowly Light Collides"	5:14
2	"Mind Is a Shadow" (featuring Vincent Jackson Jones)	4:59
3	"How Many Dreams"	4:01
4.	"Spirit and Matter"	4:59
5.	"From Our Darkest Moments"	1:30
6	"Reverse the Code"	5:03
7	"Lost to Flame"	4:44
8	"The Answer"	3:41
9	"Triptych Visions"	4:28
10	"A Tide Unturning" (featuring Tuomas Saukkonen)	5:07
11	"Taken"	6:04
