= Pitch Black (album) =

Studio album by Rifftera
- Released: August 28, 2015
- Recorded: Late 2014 – early 2015
- Genres: Melodic death metal, thrash metal
- Length: 53:57
- Label: Inverse Records
- Producer: Janne Hietala

Rifftera chronology
Pitch Black (2015)	Across the Acheron (2019)

Professional ratings
Review scores
Source	Rating
Scream	2/6 stars

Pitch Black is the debut studio album by the Finnish melodic death metal band Rifftera. It was released in 2015 and reached No. 37 on The Official Finnish Charts. The album features guest appearance from Björn "Speed" Strid of Soilwork on the track "Rotten to the Core".

== Track listing ==
All lyrics written by Janne Hietala.

No.	Title	Lyrics	Music	Length
1.	"Back to Life"	Hietala	Hietala, Mikko Kuoppamaa	5:22
2.	"One Step Closer"	Hietala	Hietala, Kuoppamaa, Antti Pöntinen	5:53
3.	"Lightbringer"	Hietala	Hietala	5:27
4.	"Ashes Fall"	Hietala	Hietala, Pöntinen	7:03
5.	"Rotten to the Core"	Hietala	Hietala	6:20
6.	"Open Wounds"	Hietala	Hietala	5:24
7.	"The Ruins of the Empire"	Hietala	Hietala, Kuoppamaa	6:40
8.	"Pitch Black"	Hietala	Hietala, Kuoppamaa	11:48
Total length:				53:57

== Personnel ==
Rifftera

- Janne Hietala – guitar, harsh vocals
- Mikko Kuoppamaa – guitar, clean vocals
- Antti Pöntinen – keyboards
- Jupe Karhu – bass

Guest musicians

- Thomas Tunkkari – drums
- Björn "Speed" Strid (Soilwork) – vocals on "Rotten to the Core"

Production

- Janne Hietala – producer, engineer, mixing
- Mikko Kuoppamaa – engineer
- Sami Koivisto – drum engineer, mastering
- Petri Lampela – cover art
- Heidi Järvi – photography

== Charts ==
Chart	Peak position
Finnish Albums (Suomen virallinen lista)	37
