= Red. White. Green. =

Studio album by Upon a Burning Body

Studio album by Upon a Burning Body
- Released: April 10, 2012
- Recorded: September–October 2011
- Studios: The Machine Shop, Weehawken, New Jersey, US
- Genres: Deathcore, metalcore
- Length: 34:07
- Label: Sumerian
- Producer: Will Putney

Upon a Burning Body chronology
This World Is Ours (2010)	Red. White. Green. (2012)	The World Is My Enemy Now (2014)

Singles from Red. White. Green.
- 1. "Sin City" Released: March 13, 2012; 2. "Once Upon a Time in Mexico" Released: April 3, 2012

Professional ratings
Review scores
Source	Rating
About.com	3/5 stars
AllMusic	3/5 stars
Alternative Press	3.5/5 stars

Red. White. Green. is the second studio album by American metalcore band Upon a Burning Body. It was released on April 10, 2012 through Sumerian Records. The album was produced by Will Putney, who also produced the band's debut album, The World Is Ours. All of the songs on the album are titled after films, continuing a trend set from their debut album, but this time mostly films that Robert Rodriguez produced or directed. It is the only album with Jonathan Gonzalez on drums and the last album with Chris "CJ" Johnson on guitar. Music videos were made for "Once Upon a Time in Mexico", "Sin City" and "Texas Blood Money". Also, a lyric video was made for "Mimic". The music video for "Sin City" was shot during a live performance at LKA Longhorn in Stuttgart, Germany.

== Track listing ==
All lyrics are written by Upon a Burning Body; all music is composed by Upon a Burning Body.

No.	Title	Length
1.	"Game Over"	1:38
2.	"Sin City"	3:04
3.	"Once Upon a Time in Mexico"	2:57
4.	"Texas Blood Money"	3:14
5.	"El Mariachi" (instrumental)	2:27
6.	"Desperado"	3:09
7.	"Mimic" (featuring Chris Fronzak of Attila)	3:20
8.	"Predators" (featuring Johnny Plague of Winds of Plague)	4:35
9.	"From Dusk Till Dawn" (featuring Nate Johnson of Fit for an Autopsy)	2:32
10.	"Planet Terror"	3:24
11.	"The Island of Lost Dreams"	3:47
Total length:		34:07

== Credits ==
Upon a Burning Body

- Danny Leal – vocals
- Sal Dominguez – lead guitar
- Chris "C.J." Johnson – rhythm guitar
- Ruben Alvarez – bass
- Jonathon Gonzalez – drums

Guest musicians

- Chris Fronzak (Attila) – Vocals on "Mimic"
- Johnny Plague (Winds of Plague) – Vocals on "Predators"
- Nate Johnson (Fit for an Autopsy) – Vocals on "From Dusk Till Dawn"

Production

- Engineering – Will Putney (Fit For An Autopsy)
- Additional Engineering – Charles Busacca; Drew Fulk; Alberto de Icaza
- Mixing – Will Putney (Fit For An Autopsy)
- Mastering – Will Putney (Fit For An Autopsy)
- Artwork – 616 Visual; McBride Design
- UABB logo – Mike Belenda

== Chart performance ==
Chart	Peak position
US Billboard 200	105
US Heatseekers	1
US Indie	20
US Rock Albums	35
US Hard Rock Albums	11
