= Fury (Upon a Burning Body album) =

Studio album by Upon a Burning Body
- Released: May 6, 2022
- Recorded: 2021–2022
- Genre: Metalcore; deathcore; groove metal
- Length: 31:10
- Label: Seek & Strike

Upon a Burning Body chronology
Southern Hostility (2019)	Fury (2022)	Blood of the Bull (2025)

Fury is the sixth studio album by American metalcore band Upon a Burning Body. The album was released on May 6, 2022, through Seek & Strike Records. The album's first track and single "A New Responsibility" was released on April 8, 2022, alongside the album's announcement. The single's music video was directed by David Brodsky, notable for his video work with The Black Dahlia Murder and Cannibal Corpse.

== Critical reception ==
Reviewer Carl Fisher describes the album as "11 tracks of savage stompery! Upon A Burning Body are impressively in sync here and their renewed passion and drive shines through strongly."

Kyle Dimond of Distorted Sound Magazine stated that "On 2019's Southern Hostility, some of the heaviness was taken out of their sound and replaced with groove. Fury aims to achieve a middle ground between the two sounds, their earlier and more immediate years combined with a stronger sense of groove. Now with a sound that everyone who's ever heard Lamb of God will feel at home in, there are some pockets of success here."

== Track listing ==
No.	Title	Length
1.	"A New Responsibility"	3:06
2.	"Snake Eyes"	3:01
3.	"Shapeshifter"	2:58
4.	"Meltdown"	2:59
5.	"Thunderheart"	3:15
6.	"Kill the Ego"	3:07
7.	"Clarity"	3:00
8.	"Sweet Serenity"	1:08
9.	"Who Am I?"	2:31
10.	"Code of Honor"	3:06
11.	"Humbling My Skin"	2:59
Total length:		31:10
