= Diesear =

Taiwanese death metal rock band

- Origin: Taiwan
- Genre: Melodic death metal
- Years active: 2007–present
- Label: Meteora Records,
- Members: Kurenai; Sui; Chris-J; Amo; Yen
- Past members: Jeff; Tzung
- Website: www.diesear.com.tw

Diesear is a melodic death metal band in Taiwan. It was established in 2007.

== History ==
Diesear is a melodic death metal band in Taiwan, established in 2007 by the head and guitarist SUI, the follow-up to join the other band members, Band issued a total of three works (including a single, a Mini album, a full album) and recording the production of documentary DVD (Ashes Of The Dawn limited Edition included), the main creators of the original Band guitarist Sui and vocalist Kurenai.

After years of searching for other musicians, band currently consists of two guitarists Sui and Chris-J who act as the creative backbone of the group. Through local and international performances, Diesear is able to gradually raise awareness abroad. The band is repeatedly invited to preform with other local artists around Taiwan. With the release of the latest album, Ashes of The Dawn, Diesear has gradually began to receive attention from an international audience. Thus, becoming recognized internationally as Taiwan's melodic death metal band.

That the band has some quality is a fact as the quartet supported Amphoris in Taiwan in October 2013. Furthermore they were invited to team up with Children Of Bodom on their Asian tour in May 2014 and are on the billing of the Tuska Metal Festival in Finland.

After Asia tour, in 2014 ESP guitar had announced Diesear guitarist Sui as one of their international endorser. Also design a signature custom guitar name "Ashes" for Sui.

2015 Diesear Album Ashes of The Dawn released by Metal Scrap Records in worldwide. ESP guitar released ESP E-II Sui Signature Guitar "Ashes/燼 STD". Bassist "Yen" was announced to join Diesear.

== Music Style ==
DIESEAR initially formed as a combination with a metalcore elements of death metal music style, according to guitarist Chris-J pointed out in record production of documentary DVD (Ashes Of The Dawn Limited Edition included), the band was effected deeply by In Flames, In The Inner Sear album which appeared Guitar Riff and many double bass drum part and melody part with some Japanese bands of color, produce a unique melodic death metal bands, so some foreign fans will still be classified as early Diesear metal. Ashes Of The Dawn album, greatly improve the technical level, the band into a faster, blunt, aggressive pure Swedish melodic death metal style of music, music adds a very high speed the twin guitar riff, and moving melody line filled in every part of the song, the band began making more and more by extreme metal fans embraced, and a high standard of album.

== Studio albums ==
- Sear (EP) – 2008
- The Inner Sear – 2009
- Ashes of the Dawn – 2013
- BloodRed Inferno – 2019

== Current members ==
- Sui - lead vocals (2017– ), guitar (2007– )
- Sathon - drums (2018– )
- Yen - bass (2015– )

== Former members ==
- Jeff - bass (2007–2010)
- Tzung - drums (2007–2011)

== Endorsement ==
ESP guitar (guitar name: Ashes) - SUI(2014)
FGN guitar - Chris-J (2014)
Providence effect pedal- SUI (2013)
Providence effect pedal- Chris-J (2013)
