= Aphyxion =

Danish band

- Origin: Ribe, Denmark
- Genres: Melodic death metal, melodic metalcore
- Years active: 2007-2024
- Labels: Prime Collective, Mighty Music
- Members: Jakob Jensen; Jesper Haas; Michael Vaal; Jais Jessen; Jonas Haagensen
- Past members: Bastian; Mads Jepsen; Bertil Rytter

Aphyxion was a heavy metal band from Denmark formed in 2007 in Ribe. The group has released three albums: Earth Entangled in 2014, Aftermath in 2016 and Void in 2019. They played at Wacken Open Air in Germany as the youngest band to ever do so. They were recognized by Metal Hammer UK to be "The saviours of melodic death metal" and "one of the most exciting bands in Europe". On September 2, 2017, they opened for Metallica at the Royal Arena in Copenhagen, Denmark. The show was part of Metallica's WorldWired Tour.

== Members ==
Current lineup:

- Jakob Jensen - drums
- Jesper Haas - rhythm guitar
- Michael Vahl - vocals
- Jais Jessen - bass
- Jonas Haagensen - lead guitar

Past members:

- Bastian - drums
- Mads Jepsen - vocals
- Bertil Rytter - rhythm guitar, backing vocals

== Discography ==
- Earth Entangled (2014)
- Aftermath (2016)
- Void (2019)
- Ad Astra (2023)
