= Southern Hostility =

Studio album by Upon a Burning Body
- Released: June 7, 2019
- Recorded: 2019
- Genres: Metalcore; groove metal
- Length: 31:07
- Labels: Seek & Strike
- Producers: Christopher Mora; Thomas Alvarez

Upon a Burning Body chronology
Straight from the Barrio (2016)	Southern Hostility (2019)	Fury (2022)

Southern Hostility is the fifth studio album by American metalcore band Upon a Burning Body. The album was released on June 7, 2019 through Seek & Strike Records.

== Background ==
The album was produced by Christopher Mora while being recorded and written over eight weeks with guitarist Ruben Alvarez's younger brother Thomas Alvarez.

== Critical reception ==
Max Morin of Exclaim! describes the album as "about as back-to-roots as it gets" going on to say that the work "sounds like a bunch of Pantera and Lamb of God fans playing in a backyard in 2010".

Dan McHugh of Distorted Sound Magazine stated that '[song] "Southern Hostility" skips the pleasantries by greeting you with an utterly savage intro/breakdown before King Of Diamonds smothers you in groove infused riffing and a bouncy tempo'.

== Track listing ==
No.	Title	Length
1.	"Southern Hostility"	1:01
2.	"King of Diamonds"	3:25
3.	"All Pride No Pain"	3:27
4.	"From Darkness"	3:30
5.	"The Champ Is Coming"	3:13
6.	"Burn"	3:08
7.	"Reinventing Hatred"	3:08
8.	"Never Alone"	3:12
9.	"The Anthem of the Doomed"	3:18
10.	"Soul Searcher"	3:45
Total length:		31:07
