= Across the Acheron =

Studio album by Rifftera
- Released: January 18, 2019
- Genres: Melodic death metal Thrash metal
- Length: 54:49
- Label: Inverse Records
- Producer: Janne Hietala

Rifftera chronology
Pitch Black (2015)	Across the Acheron (2019)

Singles from Across the Acheron
- 1. "Eye of the Storm" Released: 16 November 2018; 2. "Cutthroat Game" Released: 13 December 2018

Across the Acheron is the second full-length studio album by the Finnish melodic death metal band Rifftera, released on 18 January 2019 through Inverse Records. It is the first album to feature drummer Ville Härkönen.

== Track listing ==
All lyrics written by Janne Hietala.

No.	Title	Music	Length
1.	"Burning Paradise"	Hietala, Antti Pöntinen	6:12
2.	"Two Sides of the Story"	Hietala, Mikko Kuoppamaa	8:04
3.	"Eye of the Storm"	Hietala	6:34
4.	"Cutthroat Game"	Hietala	6:12
5.	"Cry Wolf"	Hietala	5:08
6.	"Warmonger"	Hietala	6:29
7.	"Deep Waters"	Hietala	4:50
8.	"Across the Acheron"	Hietala, Pöntinen	11:20
Total length:			54:49

== Personnel ==
=== Rifftera ===
- Janne Hietala – guitar, harsh vocals
- Mikko Kuoppamaa – guitar, clean vocals
- Antti Pöntinen – keyboards
- Jupe Karhu – bass
- Ville Härkönen – drums

=== Production ===
- Janne Hietala – production, engineering, recording, mixing
- Mikko Kuoppamaa – additional recording
- Sami Koivisto – drum engineering & recording
- Mika Jussila – mastering
- Petri Lampela – cover art
- Heidi Järvi – photography
