= Dogma (Crown the Empire album) =

Studio album by Crown the Empire
- Released: April 28, 2023
- Length: 33:50
- Label: Rise
- Producers: Zack Jones; Josh Strock

Crown the Empire chronology
07102010 (2020)	Dogma (2023)

Singles from Dogma
- 1. "In Another Life" Released: August 13, 2021; 2. "Dancing with the Dead" Released: October 29, 2021; 3. "Immortalize" Released: December 2, 2022; 4. "Dogma" Released: February 23, 2023; 5. "Black Sheep" Released: March 22, 2023

Dogma (stylized in all caps) is the fifth studio album by American metalcore band Crown the Empire. It was released on April 28, 2023, through Rise Records. It was produced by Zach Jones and Josh Strock. It is the band's first album not to feature drummer Brent Taddie, who departed from the group in January 2022. It is also the band's only album to feature drummer Jeeves Avalos and the last to feature bassist and vocalist Hayden Tree.

== Background and promotion ==
On August 12, 2021, the band released "In Another Life" featuring Courtney LaPlante of Spiritbox, along with its music video. On October 29, the band released "Dancing with the Dead" and its corresponding music video. On December 1, 2022, the band published "Immortalize" along with a music video.

On February 23, 2023, the band announced the album itself and release date. At the same time, they released the title track and video for "Dogma", whilst also revealing the album cover and the track list. On March 22, one month before the album release, the band unveiled the fifth single "Black Sheep". The music video for "Superstar" featuring Remington Leith of Palaye Royale was released April 28, 2023, coinciding with the album release.

== Critical reception ==
Professional ratings
Review scores
Source	Rating
CaliberTV	6.5/10
Ghost Cult	7/10
Kerrang!	2/5 stars
Rock 'N' Load	8/10

The album received mixed to positive reviews from critics. Alfredo Preciado of CaliberTV scored the album 6.5 out of 10 and said: "While this may not be the album that moves the needle very far for long-time listeners or the one that demonstrates the band pushing boundaries beyond their capabilities, it's quite possibly their most straightforward release yet. Dogma represents a great deal of honesty and determination for Crown the Empire, offering a modestly diverse selection worth celebrating." Ghost Cult gave the album a positive review, writing: "Dogma outlines vulnerability, resilience, determination, desperation, trust, and reliance. There is a full circle moment that reaches back to the inception of Crown the Empire, and Tree sheds light on the true meaning behind the band's logo."

Kerrang! gave the album 2 out of 5 and stated: "Despite its brighter moments, Dogma might well be washed away with the tide in the grand scheme of things, unable to stand out in the brave new world of music in 2023." Rock 'N' Load praised the album, saying "Dogma is a very welcome back for Crown the Empire and I have no doubt that the streaming figures will shoot up with this release as the band look to regain their place in the upper echelons of Heavy Rock."

== Track listing ==
Dogma track listing
No.	Title	Length
1.	"Dogma"	2:46
2.	"Black Sheep"	3:52
3.	"Modified"	3:46
4.	"Paranoid"	2:55
5.	"In Another Life" (featuring Courtney LaPlante of Spiritbox)	3:45
6.	"Superstar" (featuring Remington Leith of Palaye Royale)	3:08
7.	"Dancing with the Dead"	2:50
8.	"Immortalize"	3:35
9.	"Someone Else"	2:55
10.	"Labyrinth"	4:13
Total length:		33:50

Notes

- "Dogma" is stylized in all caps.

== Personnel ==
Crown the Empire

- Andrew "Andy Leo" Rockhold – lead vocals, keyboards, programming
- Brandon Hoover – guitars, backing vocals
- Hayden Tree – bass, unclean vocals
- Jeeves Avalos – drums, percussion

Additional musicians

- Josh Strock – additional guitar, production
- Courtney LaPlante of Spiritbox – guest vocals on track 5
- Remington Leith of Palaye Royale – guest vocals on track 6

Additional personnel

- Zach Jones – production, engineering
- Chris Athens – engineering

== Charts ==
Chart performance for Dogma
Chart (2023)	Peak position
US Top Album Sales (Billboard)	79
