= Necronautical =

English black metal band

Necronautical are an English black metal band from North-West England, consisting of Naut (Russell Dobson, lead vocals, guitar), Carcarrion (guitar, backing vocals), Anchorite (bass, backing vocals, clean vocals), and Slugh (drums). Necronautical have been described as possessing a "distinctive amalgam of extreme, melodic, aggressive sounds and exploratory concepts."

== History and approach ==
Necronautical were formed in the North-West of England by the three original members - Naut (Russ Dobson), Carcarrion (James Goodwin), and Anchorite (Matt McGing). Naut and Anchorite met in high-school, and Carcarrion met the other two at sixth-form college. The three have been playing in the band together since 2010.

Necronautical's style draws heavily upon the themes of death, history, philosophy and mythology. The band draws influence from the exploration of death, a theme from which they derive their name and visualises different landscapes through their music. In the early years, the band was experimental, with Naut explaining "when we started we were trying to integrate other styles and riffs as well, some thrash, death, Viking, or folky kind of stuff but I think the black metal style was always dominant with us."

Musically, Naut and Carcarrion typically take the lead on writing the band's music, with Anchorite providing lyrics and concepts. Explaining the band's creative process in an interview with RocknReel Reviews in June 2016, Anchorite shed light on the band's creative processes: "The music is mostly written by Naut and Carcarrion, they have writing sessions together where they share riffs and add to each other’s ideas and start to craft the bones of a song. Once we have a few ideas we get together and figure out what works in terms of arrangement and revision based on the emerging feel of the song, it’s always the feel that is most central and influences the lyrics and vocals."

Additionally, the band typically plays a heavy role in the production of their own music, and have recorded and mixed both of their albums themselves, drawing upon Ritual Sound's Samuel Turbitt for assistance with the finishing touches of The Endurance at Night. The band's third album was recorded by the Naut, excluding the drums which were recorded by Chris Fielding at Skyhammer Studio, who also mixed and mastered the album in December 2018.

After releasing their first work unsigned, Necronautical were signed up by the resurrected Cacophonous Records label in 2016. The three founding members were joined by drummer Slugh (Rob Harris) for their sophomore album in 2016.

Following from the release of The Endurance at Night (2016), the band made their live debut opening for Dark Funeral at the Camden Underworld and would go on to tour extensively around the UK and Europe. Necronautical joined Winterfylleth on their 10 date anniversary tour in 2017, as well as appearing at Inferno Metal Festival in 2018.

Necronautical signed with Candlelight Records in 2019, and released their third album Apotheosis on 30 August 2019. The album was mixed and mastered by producer Chris Feilding, and featured cover artwork by David Thiérrée.

The album's music and lyrical content was in part inspired by the writings and philosophies of Friedrich Nietzsche and Chuck Palahniuk.

The release was preceded by the single "Nihil Sub Sole Novum", released on 13 June 2019, and was accompanied by a music video. The band said of the single: “We feel that this song acts as a perfect microcosm for the direction of the album and of Necronautical itself.”

The album's title track was released the day before the album and received high critical praise, with one critic from Distorted Sound Magazine stating "The album’s fourth, titular track has a vast and expansive sound that it’s hard not to get drawn in by straight away." and another review from Bring The Noise adding "The record’s title track takes the trophy for one of the best ‘classic’ black metal tracks of the year thus far."

== Reception ==
Their second album The Endurance at Night received a number of rave reviews from European black metal websites and publications. DGR at nocleansinging.com said "I had figured, given the band’s previous mark of quality, that Endurance At Night would be a good album, but what I did not expect was that Necronautical would excel on every front." German website Metal1.info gave the album 8.5 out of 10, praising the tone of the album.

Their third album Apotheosis received a positive reception from various webzines and magazines from around the world. Carl Fisher at gbhbl.com described the album as "A savage style of black metal" adding "Necronautical are a beastly bunch with the power and poise to drop anyone and everyone to their knees. Apotheosis is a beastly listen but not in a raw, unlistenable state. Instead it’s an album that has all the black metal trimmings with plenty of ferocity but wrapped up in a more modern and discernible way." and Jordan McEvoy at Bring The Noise UK described the album as being "Drenched in atmosphere and savage classic black metal" concluding "Necronautical triumphantly return to the fray with Apotheosis. While it could have been shorter in places, it is an excellent showcase of the blend between classic and modern black metal. As they continue to refine and improve their sound, they are making themselves to be one of the rising stars in modern black metal today."

== Discography ==
- Black Sea Misanthropy (2014)
- The Endurance at Night (2016)
- Apotheosis (2019)
- Slain in the Spirit (2021)
