= Sudden Sky =

Studio album by Crown the Empire
- Released: July 19, 2019
- Length: 34:14
- Label: Rise
- Producer: Drew Fulk

Crown the Empire chronology
Retrograde (2016)	Sudden Sky (2019)	07102010 (2020)

Singles from Sudden Sky
- 1. "20/20" Released: July 13, 2018; 2. "What I Am" Released: September 21, 2018; 3. "Sudden Sky" Released: April 5, 2019; 4. "MZRY" Released: June 19, 2019

Sudden Sky is the fourth studio album by American metalcore band Crown the Empire. It was released on July 19, 2019 through Rise Records and was produced by Drew Fulk. It is the band's first album not to feature vocalist Dave Escamilla since their EP Limitless, who departed from the group in January 2017. It is also the last album to feature the band's drummer Brent Taddie before he left the band in January 2022.

== Background ==
On June 27, 2019, Rise Records' YouTube channel released a video titled, "Crown The Empire - The Making of the 'Sudden Sky' Album Cover." The cover was designed through three-dimensional full-body scans of all the band members, which bassist Hayden Tree described as "making [themselves] seem like an art installation in a 3D, futuristic manner." In the aforementioned video, guitarist Brandon Hoover explained that each member's poses were direct depictions of the emotions they felt throughout the course of making the album:

"Andy [Rockhold] (vocalist, center left)'s always been the one to laugh through all the bullshit, but on the inside he's fighting a lot of demons. [Hayden] Tree (bassist, center right) is always moving forward 'cause he's afraid to stand still. [Brent] Taddie (drummer, far right) has always been very passive and reluctant to change. For me (far left), this album felt like free-falling; I had no idea whether we were gonna land on our feet or crash and burn."

— Brandon Hoover

Tree also explained in the video that the album cover's message also ties directly into the album's title:

"The meaning of the album, Sudden Sky, is the whole entire idea of, 'one moment you're here, and the next moment, you're gone.' That also means for people to become more vulnerable, to open themselves up and be who you are, show your bad sides, and that's what we're doing here with our album cover."

— Hayden Tree

Professional ratings
Review scores
Source	Rating
Dead Press!	7/10
Distorted Sound	6/10
New Noise	4.5/5 stars
Sputnikmusic	2/5 stars

== Track listing ==
No.	Title	Length
1.	"(X)"	1:20
2.	"20/20"	4:01
3.	"What I Am"	3:16
4.	"Blurry (Out of Place)"	3:20
5.	"Red Pills"	3:46
6.	"MZRY"	4:04
7.	"Under the Skin"	3:08
8.	"SEQU3NCE"	3:18
9.	"March of the Ignorant"	3:36
10.	"Sudden Sky"	4:20
Total length:		34:14

Notes

- "What I Am" is stylized in all lower case, whereas track 4 has the word "Blurry" stylized in all caps and "Out of Place" in all lower case.

== Personnel ==
Crown the Empire

- Andrew Rockhold – lead vocals, keyboards, programming, unclean vocals on "20/20" and "Sudden Sky"
- Brandon Hoover – guitars
- Hayden Tree – bass, unclean vocals
- Brent Taddie – drums, percussion

Additional personnel

- Drew Fulk – production
- Justin Deblieck – composition on "20/20" and "Under the Skin"

== Charts ==
Chart (2019)	Peak position
UK Rock & Metal Albums (OCC)	23
US Billboard 200	190
US Independent Albums (Billboard)	8
US Top Alternative Albums (Billboard)	15
US Top Hard Rock Albums (Billboard)	13
US Top Rock Albums (Billboard)	37
