= Sifting (band) =

Venezuelan-American metal band

- Origin: Caracas, Venezuela
- Genres: Heavy metal; progressive metal; hard rock
- Years active: 2010–present
- Label: Eclipse
- Members: Eduardo Osuna Gil; Mo LaMastro; Winston Jarquin; Joey Aguirre
- Website: siftingmusic.com

Sifting is a Venezuelan-American progressive metal band from Los Angeles, California, United States. The band was formed in April 2010 by Eduardo Osuna Gil (vocals/guitars).

== History ==
=== All The Hated (2013) ===
The band was formed in April 2010 by frontman Eduardo Osuna Gil while he was living in Caracas, Venezuela. After suffering the loss of his mother and grandmother in a plane crash, Eduardo began writing original material to cope. Drummer Abelardo Bolaño, guitarist Luis Farias, and bassist Victor Ladines joined the band. The band quickly gained popularity throughout Venezuela, and shared the stage with Bullet for My Valentine on their Latin American Tour in 2011. In 2012, Abelardo left the band and Ruben Limas was added later that year. They released the album All the Hated in late 2013. Shortly thereafter, the band toured with Zapato 3, one of Venezuela’s most popular classic rock bands, supported Viniloversus winners of a Latin-American Grammy, and made several TV appearances on national television. Around the same time, their single “All The Hated” was chosen for the Rock Band video game.

=== Blurry Paintings (2015) ===
Early 2014, Eduardo moved to Los Angeles, CA, and reformed the band with new members Chris Eklund (guitar), Brady Tait (bass), and Alejandro Martinez (drums). In 2015, they caught the attention of producer Steve Evetts (Suicide Silence, The Dillinger Escape Plan, Sense's Fail) and recorded a three-song EP entitled Blurry Paintings.

=== Not From Here (2017) ===
The band signed with Eclipse Records in the Spring of 2017 and released their second full-length album "Not From Here" on September 29, 2017. The album made it to the charts at #94 as the best metal album of 2017 by the Australian magazine Sentinel Daily, #28 as the best Venezuelan band album of 2017 by one of the biggest media outlets in Venezuela: CochinoPop, and #4 as the best Venezuelan rock metal album of 2017 by one of the biggest metal music outlets of Venezuela: Cresta Metálica.

They were able to line up endorsement deals with ESP Guitars, Engl Amplification, and Spector Guitars. From there, the band was approached by Ryan Williams (Velvet Revolver, Pearl Jam, Rage Against The Machine), who recorded and produced their second full-length album "Not From Here" in late 2016. Soon after the album recordings, Chris Eklund, Brady Tait, and Alejandro Martinez left the band. Eduardo quickly brought in founding member Abelardo Bolaño and two locals from the Los Angeles scene, Wins Jarquin on bass and Richard Garcia on guitar, for the album release and tour. Immediately afterwards, the band hit the road for a thirty-date North American tour and was able to make TV appearances. By the end of 2017, Abelardo had to leave the band and Joey Aguirre joined right before their tour to Ecuador with Tarja. They have consistently toured throughout the United States since, supporting bands like Sons Of Apollo, Prong, Eyes Set To Kill, and Dayshell, and lined up more endorsements such as Paiste Cymbals, 64 Audio, Audix Microphones, and Pig Hog Cables.

== Members ==
=== Current members ===
- Eduardo Osuna Gil – vocals/guitar
- Mo LaMastro – lead guitar
- Winston Jarquin – bass
- Joey Aguirre – drums

=== Former members ===
- Richard Garcia – Guitars (2016–2021)
- Abelardo Bolaño (2010–2012, 2016–2017)
- Christopher Eklund – guitars (2015–2016)
- Brady Tait – bass (2015–2016)
- Alejandro Martinez – drums (2015–2016)
- Ruben Limas – drums (2012–2014)
- Luis Farias – guitars (2010–2014)
- Victor Ladines – bass (2010–2014)

== Discography ==
=== Studio albums ===
- All The Hated (2013)
- Not From Here (2017)
- The Infinite Loop (2019)

=== Extended plays ===
- All The Hated (2011)
- Blurry Paintings (2015)

=== Singles ===
- Pledge Of Our Generation (2014)
