= Rifftera =

Finnish metal band

- Origin: Vaasa, Finland
- Genres: Thrash metal, melodic death metal
- Years active: 2010–present
- Labels: Inverse
- Members: Janne Hietala; Mikko Kuoppamaa; Antti Pöntinen; Jupe Karhu; Ville Härkönen
- Website: www.rifftera.com

Rifftera is a Finnish metal band formed in Vaasa in 2010. Their music is influenced especially by melodic death metal and thrash metal. Rifftera's debut album Pitch Black was released in 2015 and reached No. 37 on The Official Finnish Charts.

== Members ==
Lineup

- Janne Hietala – guitar, harsh vocals (2010–present)
- Mikko Kuoppamaa – guitar, clean vocals (2012–present)
- Antti Pöntinen – keyboards (2010–present)
- Jupe Karhu – bass (2010–present)
- Ville Härkönen – drums (2016–present)

Session musicians

- Thomas Tunkkari – drums (on Pitch Black, 2015)

== Discography ==
- Pitch Black (2015)
- Across the Acheron (2019)
