= Desecravity =

Japanese technical death metal band

- Origin: Tokyo, Japan
- Genres: Technical death metal, death metal
- Years active: 2007–present
- Labels: Willowtip Records
- Members: Yuichi Kudo; Daisuke Ichiboshi; Yuya Takeda; Hiroshi Kojima
- Past members: Toshihiro Inagaki; Keisuke Takagi; Shogo Tokita; Yujiro Suzuki
- Website: www.desecravity.net

Desecravity is a technical death metal band formed in 2007 from Tokyo, Japan. The band is signed to Willowtip Records and released their full-length debut album entitled Implicit Obedience in January 2012 and the second full-length album entitled Orphic Signs in November 2014.

== Members ==
Current members

- Yuichi Kudo - drums (2007–present)
- Daisuke Ishiboroshi - bass (2011–present), vocals (2019–present)
- Yuya Takeda - guitar (2016–present)
- Hiroshi Kojima - guitar (2019–present)

Former members

- Toshihiro Inagaki - bass (2007–2011)
- Keisuke Takagi - guitars (2010–2012)
- Shogo Tokita - vocals, guitars (2012–2016)
- Yujiro Suzuki - vocal, guitar (2007–2010, 2011–2013, 2016–2018)

== Discography ==
Studio albums

- Implicit Obedience (2012)
- Orphic Signs (2014)
- Anathema (2019)
