= The World Is Ours (Upon a Burning Body album) =

Studio album by Upon a Burning Body
- Released: April 6, 2010
- Recorded: September 2009
- Studios: The Machine Shop, Weehawken, New Jersey, U.S.
- Genre: Deathcore
- Length: 33:03
- Label: Sumerian
- Producer: Will Putney

Upon a Burning Body chronology
The World Is Ours (2010)	Red. White. Green. (2012)

Professional ratings
Review scores
Source	Rating
AbsolutePunk	85%

The World Is Ours is the debut studio album by American metalcore band Upon a Burning Body. The album was released on April 6, 2010 through Sumerian Records and was produced by Will Putney. All of the song titles are taken from films, in most of which Al Pacino starred.

== Track listing ==
All lyrics are written by Danny Leal and Ruben Alvarez; all music is composed by Upon a Burning Body.

No.	Title	Length
1.	"Showtime"	1:11
2.	"Carlito's Way"	2:53
3.	"Donnie Brasco"	3:49
4.	"Righteous Kill"	2:39
5.	"Scarface"	2:47
6.	"Intermission"	2:47
7.	"Heat"	3:21
8.	"Any Given Sunday"	3:24
9.	"Devil's Advocate"	3:36
10.	"City Hall"	6:36
Total length:		33:03

== Credits ==
Upon a Burning Body

- Danny Leal – vocals
- Sal Dominguez – lead guitar
- Chris "C.J." Johnson – rhythm guitar
- Ruben Alvarez – bass
- Ramon "Lord Cocos" Villareal – drums

Production

- Will Putney – mixing, mastering
- 616 Visual and McBride Design – artwork
- Mike Belenda logo – UABB

Guest musicians

- Carmen Serignese (Up in Arms) vocals – on "City Hall"

== Chart performance ==
Chart	Peak position
US Heatseekers	28
