= L'Acéphale =

American avant-garde black metal band

L'Acéphale is an American avant-garde black metal band fronted by Portland, Oregon musician Set Sothis Nox La.

== Discography ==
- Mord Und Totschlag (self-released, 2005; re-issue: Aurora Borealis, 2007)
- Stahlhartes Gehäuse (Parasitic Records, 2009)
- Malefeasance (Aurora Borealis, 2009)
- L' Acéphale (Eisenwald, 2019)
