= Kill the Lights (band) =

Welsh-American metal supergroup

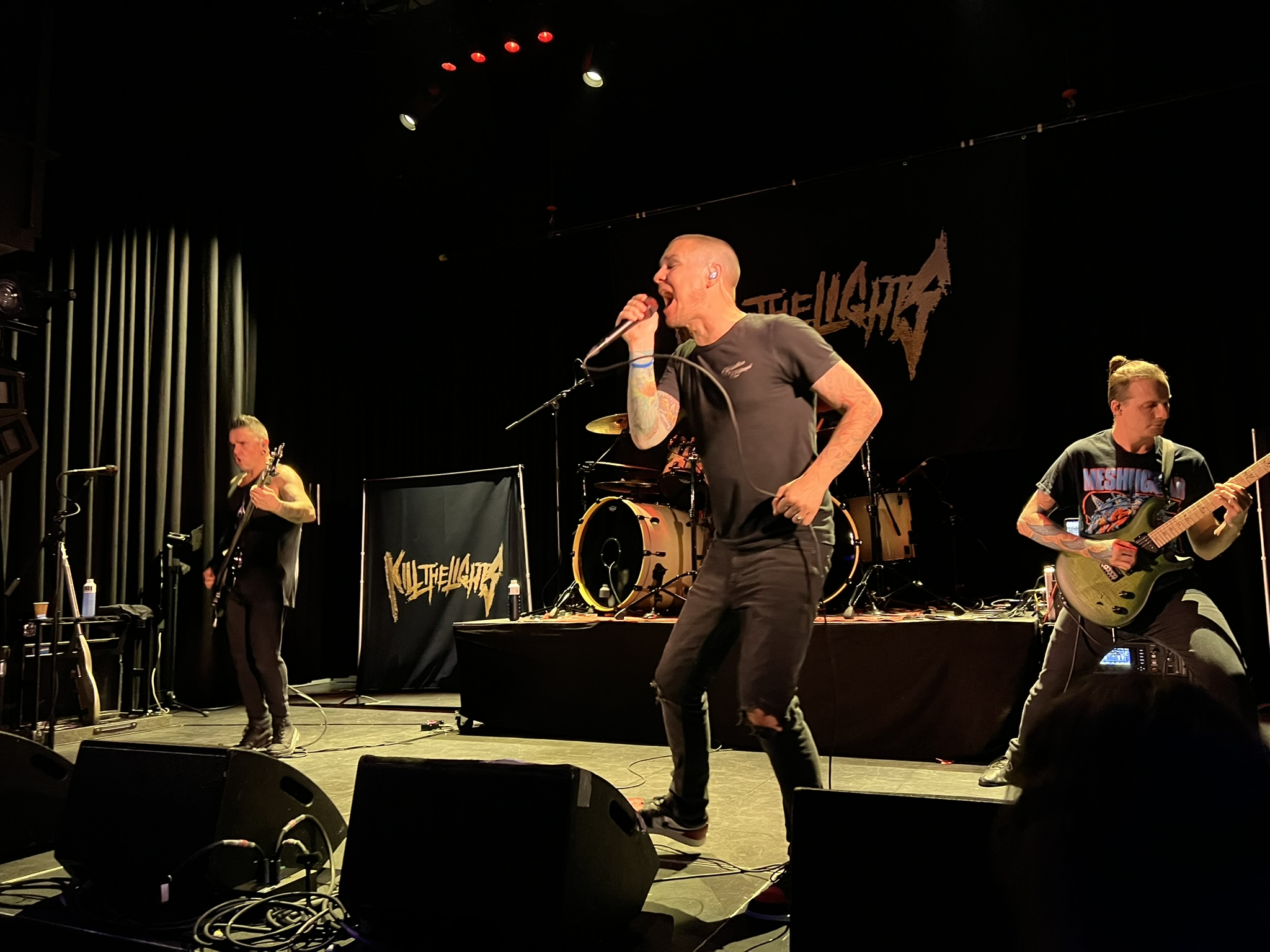
- Kill the Lights performing in the Netherlands in 2024

Background information
- Origin: Bridgend, Wales / United States
- Genres: Melodic metalcore; heavy metal; Alternative metal
- Years active: 2019–present
- Label: Fearless Records
- Members: James Clark; Michael "Moose" Thomas; Jason "Jay" James; Jeremy Pringsheim
- Past members: Davey Richmond; Chris Clancy; Jordan Whelan; Travis Montgomery
- Website: killthelightsofficial.com

Kill the Lights is a Welsh-American heavy metal supergroup formed in 2019. The band was founded by former Bullet for My Valentine drummer Michael "Moose" Thomas and guitarist Jordan Whelan.

The lineup has included members of Bullet for My Valentine, Throw the Fight, Still Remains, Threat Signal, and Glamour of the Kill.

The band released their debut album The Sinner in 2020, followed by their second studio album Death Melodies in 2024 via Fearless Records.

== History ==
=== Formation and early releases (2019) ===
Kill the Lights was formed following Michael Thomas's departure from Bullet for My Valentine in 2016. Thomas stated that he wanted to return to a heavier and more organic metal sound.

The original lineup consisted of James Clark (vocals), Jordan Whelan (guitar), Travis Montgomery (guitar), and Davey Richmond (bass).

The band released their debut single, "The Faceless", in January 2019.

=== The Sinner (2020) ===
The band released their debut studio album, The Sinner, on August 21, 2020.

The album featured the singles:

- "The Faceless"
- "Through The Night"
- "Shed My Skin"
- "Watch You Fall"

The album was released during the COVID-19 pandemic, limiting touring opportunities. Metal Hammer rated the album 4/5, praising its groove and traditional metal influence. Kerrang! gave the album 2/5.

The Sinner was produced by Colin Richardson.

=== Line-up changes and standalone singles (2020–2021) ===
Following the release of The Sinner, bassist Davey Richmond departed the band. Chris Clancy briefly joined as bassist while also contributing to production duties.

In 2021, former Bullet for My Valentine bassist Jason "Jay" James officially joined Kill the Lights.

During this period, the band released additional standalone singles including:

- "Chasing Shadows"
- "Voices"
- A cover of Metallica’s "Battery"

=== Death Melodies (2024) ===
The band's second album, Death Melodies, was released on March 8, 2024, via Fearless Records.

The album was recorded in Canada, Minneapolis, and the United Kingdom, and produced by Colin Richardson and Chris Clancy.

Themes explored on the album include anxiety, depression, addiction, and personal struggle.

Kerrang! rated the album 3/5, describing it as confident and rooted in early-2000s melodic metal influences.

== Musical style ==
Kill the Lights have been described as melodic metalcore with strong influences from classic heavy metal.

Their sound incorporates dual-guitar harmonies, thrash-inspired riffs, and a mix of clean and aggressive vocals.

== Touring ==
Touring activity following the release of The Sinner was limited due to the COVID-19 pandemic. The band later resumed live performances in the United Kingdom, Europe, and North America.

In 2024, Kill the Lights supported Death Melodies with festival appearances and club shows.

== Career timeline ==
2019

Formation and release of debut single "The Faceless".

2020

Release of The Sinner via Fearless Records.

2021

Jason "Jay" James joined as bassist.

2024

Release of Death Melodies.

2025

Jordan Whelan and Travis Montgomery left the band.

== Band members ==
=== Current members ===
- James Clark - lead vocals (2019-present)
- Michael "Moose" Thomas - drums, percussion (2019-present)
- Jason "Jay" James - bass guitar, backing vocals (2021-present)
- Jeremy Pringsheim - guitars (2025-present)

=== Former members ===
- Davey Richmond - bass guitar (2019-2020)
- Chris Clancy - bass guitar (2020-2021)
- Travis Montgomery - rhythm guitar (2019-2025)
- Jordan Whelan - lead guitar (2019-2025)

== Discography ==
=== Studio albums ===
- The Sinner (2020)
- Death Melodies (2024)

=== Selected singles ===
- "The Faceless" (2019)
- "Through The Night" (2020)
- "Shed My Skin" (2020)
- "Watch You Fall" (2020)
- "Chasing Shadows" (2021)
- "Voices" (2021)
- "Battery" (Metallica cover) (2020)
