= Straight from the Barrio =

Studio album by Upon a Burning Body
- Released: October 28, 2016
- Genre: Metalcore
- Length: 40:12
- Label: Sumerian
- Producer: Matt Good, Cory Brunnemann, Chris Mora

Upon a Burning Body chronology
The World Is My Enemy Now (2014)	Straight from the Barrio (2016)	Southern Hostility (2019)

Straight from the Barrio is the fourth studio album by American metalcore band Upon a Burning Body, released on October 28, 2016, on the Sumerian Records label.

== Track listing ==
Lyrics by Danny Leal and Ruben Alvarez

No.	Title	Length
1.	"'Til the Break of Dawn" (featuring Jose Mangin)	3:44
2.	"Already Broken"	2:54
3.	"You Don't Own Me"	2:58
4.	"Media Blackout"	2:37
5.	"B.M.F."	3:42
6.	"Straight from the Barrio (210)"	3:49
7.	"Leave the Pain Behind"	3:23
8.	"Walk Alone Again"	3:17
9.	"Fake Plastic Smile"	3:24
10.	"D.T.A. (Don't Trust Anyone)"	3:34
11.	"The Outcast"	3:51
12.	"My Distorted Reflection"	2:59
Total length:		40:12

== Credits ==
Upon a Burning Body

- Danny Leal - vocals
- Ruben Alvarez - guitars
- Rey Martinez - bass
- Ramon Villareal - drums
- Tito Felix - percussion

== Charts ==
Chart (2016)	Peak position
US Independent Albums (Billboard)	12
US Hard Rock Albums (Billboard)	8
US Rock Albums (Billboard)	22
