= The Fallout (Crown the Empire album) =

Studio album by Crown the Empire
- Released: November 19, 2012
- Recorded: August–October 2012
- Studio: Metro 37 Studios, Rochester, Michigan, U.S.; The Foundation Estate
- Genre: Metalcore; post-hardcore; electronicore
- Length: 39:55
- Label: Rise
- Producer: Joey Sturgis

Crown the Empire chronology
Limitless (2011)	The Fallout (2012)	The Resistance: Rise of The Runaways (2014)

Singles from The Fallout
- 1. "Makeshift Chemistry" Released: October 23, 2012; 2. "Limitless" Released: December 9, 2013

The Fallout is the debut studio album by American metalcore band Crown the Empire. It was released on November 19, 2012 through Rise Records and was produced by Joey Sturgis. It is the first album with new vocalist Dave Escamilla and the only album with founding keyboardist Austin Duncan, who left the band prior to the release.

== Background and recording ==
Recording started in August 2012, when they entered the studio with Joey Sturgis. During the recording process, the band introduced Dave Escamilla as an official member and additional vocalist for the album.

For the deluxe edition of the album, the band re-recorded their EP Limitless and intended to release it as part of the deluxe reissue of the album in 2013, the difference being that they have incorporated Escamilla's vocals into them. Also for the release was the release of "Limitless" as a single, which was released along with its own lyric video.

== Release and promotion ==
The first single released off the album was "Makeshift Chemistry" on October 23, 2012. "Memories of a Broken Heart" was released on November 8, 11 days before the album's release. The album was made available to stream on November 15, the same day the music video for "The Fallout" was released.

The album itself was released on November 19, 2012 on CDs and digital download. The deluxe edition was released on December 9, 2013, which contained all seven tracks from the band's debut EP Limitless, re-recorded with David Escamilla.

== Critical reception ==
Professional ratings
Review scores
Source	Rating
AbsolutePunk	75%
Alternative Press	2.5/5 stars

The album received mixed to positive responses from critics. The AbsolutePunk review called the album's sound post-hardcore, and while it could risk getting generic and that the focus throughout the album was random, with the uneven nature of the tracks and the relatable but cliché lyricism coming in for criticism, he went on to praise the vocals and range of different vibes and sounds and generally praised the album.

Alternative Press called the album's sound primarily metalcore although comparing its efforts and overall sound to the likes of The Dillinger Escape Plan, Botch and Breach, gave a more critical review, which was primarily targeted towards the presence of dubstep sounds and electronic elements throughout the album.

== Track listing ==
No.	Title	Length
1.	"Oh, Catastrophe"	1:59
2.	"The Fallout"	3:56
3.	"Memories of a Broken Heart"	4:13
4.	"Makeshift Chemistry"	4:11
5.	"The One You Feed"	3:53
6.	"Menace"	4:28
7.	"Graveyard Souls"	3:22
8.	"Two's Too Many"	3:05
9.	"Evidence"	3:26
10.	"Children of Love"	3:04
11.	"Johnny's Revenge"	4:15
Total length:		39:55

Deluxe reissue edition bonus tracks
No.	Title	Length
12.	"The Glass Elevator (Walls)" (re-recorded)	2:59
13.	"Breaking Point" (re-recorded)	4:34
14.	"Wake Me Up" (re-recorded)	4:20
15.	"Johnny Ringo" (re-recorded)	4:14
16.	"Voices" (re-recorded; featuring Cassie Marin)	3:19
17.	"Limitless" (re-recorded)	4:21
18.	"Lead Me Out of the Dark"	3:18
Total length:		67:00

Notes:

- On the deluxe reissue, the track "Graveyard Souls" is mis-titled as "Journals" for unknown reasons.
- Britni Michelle Horner and Denis Stoff do not reprise their roles as guest vocalists on the re-recorded versions of "Voices" and "Limitless" respectively; instead, they are both are replaced by Cassie Marin and co-lead vocalist Dave Escamilla.
- "Lead Me Out of the Dark" was not re-recorded for the deluxe edition and instead is the original version from Limitless.

== Personnel ==
Credits adapted from AllMusic.

Crown the Empire

- Andrew "Andy Leo" Rockhold – lead vocals
- Dave Escamilla – co-lead vocals
- Bennett "Benn Suede" Vogelman – lead guitar, backing vocals
- Brandon Hoover – rhythm guitar, backing vocals
- Hayden Tree – bass
- Brent Taddie – drums, percussion
- Austin Duncan – keyboards, programming

Additional musicians

- Cassie Marin – guest vocals on "Voices"

Additional personnel

- Joey Sturgis – engineering, mastering, mixing, production
- Nick Scott – engineering
- Jeff Dunne – drum editing
- Brendan Barone – composition
- Crown the Empire – composition
- Derek Brewer – management
- JJ Cassiere and Tom Taaffe – booking
- Forfathers – art direction

== Charts ==
Chart	Peak Positions
Independent Albums	8
Hard Rock Albums	7
Top Heatseekers	1
Top Rock Albums	37
