= Limitless (Crown the Empire EP) =

EP by Crown the Empire
- Released: November 29, 2011
- Genre: Metalcore; post-hardcore; electronicore
- Length: 27:27
- Label: Self-released
- Producer: Crown the Empire

Crown the Empire chronology
Limitless (2011)	The Fallout (2012)

Singles from Limitless
- 1. "Wake Me Up" Released: November 18, 2011; 2. "Voices" Released: December 12, 2012

Limitless is an EP by American metalcore band Crown the Empire. It was self-released on November 29, 2011 and was also produced by the band themselves.

== Track listing ==
No.	Title	Length
1.	"The Glass Elevator (Walls)"	2:55
2.	"Breaking Point"	4:42
3.	"Wake Me Up"	4:23
4.	"Johnny Ringo"	4:19
5.	"Voices" (featuring Britni Michelle Horner)	3:21
6.	"Limitless" (featuring Denis Stoff)	4:27
7.	"Lead Me Out of the Dark"	3:17
Total length:		27:27

== Personnel ==
Crown the Empire

- Andrew "Andy Leo" Rockhold – lead vocals
- Bennett "Benn Suede" Vogelman – lead guitar, backing vocals
- Brandon Hoover – rhythm guitar, backing vocals
- Hayden Tree – bass
- Brent Taddie – drums, percussion
- Austin Duncan – keyboards, programming

Additional musicians

- Britni Michelle Horner – guest vocals on "Voices"
- Denis Stoff – guest vocals on "Limitless"

Additional personnel

- Crown the Empire – production
