= Crown the Empire =

American metalcore band

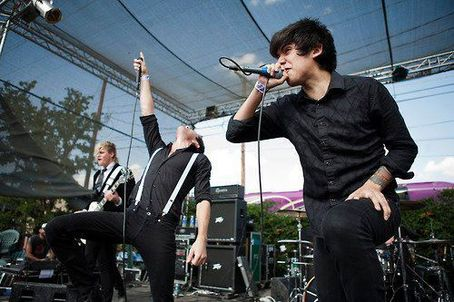
- Crown the Empire performing in 2012

Background information
- Origin: Dallas, Texas, U.S.
- Genres: Metalcore; post-hardcore; progressive rock; hard rock
- Years active: 2010–present
- Label: Rise
- Members: Andrew "Andy Leo" Rockhold; Brandon Hoover
- Past members: Devin Detar; Alex Massey; Brandon Shroyer; Austin Duncan; Bennett "Benn Suede" Vogelman; Dave Escamilla; Brent Taddie; Jeeves Avalos; Hayden Tree
- Website: crowntheempireband.com

Crown the Empire is an American metalcore band from Dallas, Texas, formed in 2010. The band comprises vocalist Andrew "Andy Leo" Rockhold and guitarist Brandon Hoover. They are currently signed to Rise Records and have released five studio albums. Their most recent studio album, Dogma, was released on April 28, 2023.

== History ==
=== Formation and Limitless EP (2010–2011) ===
Crown the Empire was formed in May 2010, when "Brandon [Hoover] and Austin decided to start jamming together" during their time at Colleyville Heritage High School. The initial line-up consisted of lead vocalist Andrew "Andy Leo" Rockhold (then Velasquez), rhythm guitarist/backing vocalist Hayden Tree, lead guitarist/backing vocalist Brandon Hoover, bassist Devin Detar, drummer Alex Massey and keyboardist Austin Duncan. The band's ultimate goal was to "be heavier than most bands in their area," while "bringing huge, poppy choruses to a genre that can become pretty stale." Crown the Empire played their first show at Compass Church in Colleyville, Texas, on July 10, 2010. During their formative years, the band experienced a number of lineup changes: In late 2010, Detar was replaced by Brandon Shroyer and in early 2011, the band fired their drummer Alex Massey. After some months of auditioning drummers, Brent Taddie was announced as the band's new drummer on June 6, 2011. Five days later, the band uploaded a video asking their fans for vocal covers with a focus on harsh vocals. The winner of this contest was announced on June 30 as Zac Johnson, who was invited to join Crown the Empire, performing harsh vocals at their live shows. Around October 2011, bassist Brandon Shroyer decided to leave the band, which resulted in the guitarists switching instruments. Brandon Hoover switched from lead to rhythm guitar, Hayden Tree took over Shroyer's position on bass and Bennett "Benn Suede" Vogelman joined Crown the Empire as their new lead guitarist.

This line-up, with the exception of Johnson, would go on to record their first EP, Limitless, which was released on iTunes on November 29, 2011. On December 5, 2011, the band released a behind-the-scenes look at the filming for the music video for "Voices". During the video the band announced the release date for the music video to be December 11. Also in December, they released a cover of the classic holiday song "Let It Snow" and an acoustic performance of "Wake Me Up".

=== Introduction of Escamilla, signing to Rise Records and The Fallout (2012–2013) ===
By February 2012, Johnson had left the band and they would enlist the help of their manager Brendan Barone to perform harsh vocals. In March, Crown the Empire performed a short tour with A Skylit Drive and appeared at the Never Say Never Music Festival. They also teased a big announcement, which turned out to be their signing to Rise Records. Along with the announcement video, the band released a free cover of the song "Moves Like Jagger" in appreciation of the support from their fans.

Having performed with the band since June 2, 2012, the band officially announced the addition of harsh vocalist David Escamilla on August 26, 2012. Along with the news of Escamilla joining the band, they announced that they would be heading into the studio with Joey Sturgis to begin recording their debut album. On September 7, the band released the music video for "Johnny Ringo". Around this time, Hayden Tree was let go because the band felt he didn't focus on the craft enough. After touring Europe for the first time with Pierce the Veil, the band asked Tree to come back.

On October 23, the band announced the name and release date of their debut album, The Fallout, which was released on November 20 through Rise Records. One week later, Austin Duncan left the band and Andrew Rockhold took the keyboards. On November 14, the band released part one of their two part extended music video beginning with the intro track, "Oh, Catastrophe". The following day the band released the second part of their extended music video with the title track of their upcoming album, The Fallout. On November 15, the band streamed their debut album in its entirety five days before the official release of the album.

On March 11, 2013, the band announced their first headlining tour called The Generation Now Tour, which kicked off on May 7 in Ohio, and wrapped up in Oklahoma on May 26, with supporting acts Capture, Palisades, Heartist and Famous Last Words. The band also played South by South West and toured with Like Moths to Flames. On March 23, the band was announced to be playing Warped Tour 2013. Later that day, the band released a live music video of their single "Makeshift Chemistry". The following day the band released their own Warped Tour announcement.

On June 4, the band released a live music video for "Menace". On June 25, the band was announced to be joining Asking Alexandria on their headlining tour coinciding with the release of their new album From Death to Destiny, with fellow supporting acts Motionless in White and Upon a Burning Body. Also on June 25, the band announced that they would shoot a music video for a song from their 2012 debut album. This song turned out to be "Memories of a Broken Heart", the music video was released on August 2, 2013.

A reissue of The Fallout was released on December 10, 2013. It came with a re-recording of the band's debut EP Limitless, with David Escamilla handling all harsh vocals. On November 28, 2013, the re-recorded version of "Breaking Point" was released for streaming.

=== The Resistance: Rise of The Runaways and Benn Suede's departure (2014–2015) ===
In January 2014, Crown the Empire was announced to appear on the 2014 Vans Warped Tour.

On July 21, 2014, Crown the Empire won Alternative Press Magazine's award for best breakthrough band and their second album reached number 1 on the iTunes Rock Charts. Then on July 22, 2014, the band released their second album The Resistance: Rise of The Runaways, which debuted in its first week at number 7 on the Billboard Top 200. On July 24, the band announced their music video for the song "Machines" to be released the following day and in under 48 hours it got over 100,000 views. On July 26, Crown the Empire announced their new headlining tour supported with Volumes, Secrets, Ice Nine Kills, and The Family Ruin which starts on August 30, 2014 in Anaheim, California and ends on September 20, 2014 in Birmingham, Alabama.

On September 8, 2015, Crown the Empire released a new single, titled "Prisoners of War" on digital retailers as part of a deluxe reissue of The Resistance: Rise of The Runaways. The deluxe reissue was released on October 30, 2015, including "Prisoners of War", another new track titled "Cross Our Bones", an alternate version of "Machines" and an acoustic version of "Millennia". On November 6, Crown the Empire revealed to Alternative Press that their lead guitarist Benn Suede was no longer part of the band. Brandon Hoover switched to lead guitar, while David Escamilla took over rhythm guitar duties, as Hayden Tree returned to perform backing vocals.

In late 2016, Crown The Empire covered the My Chemical Romance song "Welcome to the Black Parade" for a collective cover album.

=== Retrograde and Escamilla's departure (2016–2017) ===
The band released their third studio album Retrograde on July 22, 2016. The album debuted at number 15 on the Billboard 200. In November 2016, the band announced that vocalist/rhythm guitarist Dave Escamilla was going to be on a hiatus from touring. On January 8, 2017, the band announced that vocalist/rhythm guitarist David Escamilla was no longer part of the band through their Facebook page. Brandon Hoover and Hayden Tree took their vocal duties, and now the band has three vocalists instead of two. Later the same day, Dave Escamilla made statements alleging most of the band's music to date was written by outside sources, which was eventually confirmed by the band.

=== Sudden Sky and 07102010 (2018–2020) ===
In January 2018, the band debuted the song "20/20" while on tour with Asking Alexandria and Black Veil Brides. The song is the first not to feature former vocalist/rhythm guitarist David Escamilla and has bassist Hayden performing backing unclean vocals and guitarist Brandon Hoover performing backing clean vocals.

The band began working on writing new music before embarking on Warped Tour 2018. While working on the new album lead vocalist/keyboardist Andy Leo released a demo of a song that he had written that was deemed "too sad" to be on the new album. The song, "Everything Breaks" can be found on Dropbox for free download.

On July 13, the band released an official version of their song "20/20" which they had been playing live since January along with an accompanying music video starring Vered Blonstein and Jonny Preston. On September 20, that same year, the band released a new track titled "What I Am" along with a music video. On April 5, 2019, the band released another track, "Sudden Sky". On June 19, the band released another new track, titled "MZRY" and announced their album Sudden Sky set for release on July 19, 2019.

On March 16, 2020, the band announced on Instagram that guitarist Brandon Hoover had been tested positive for COVID-19 after their tour in Asia and Africa. On March 28, Hoover announced that he had recovered and was clear from the virus.

On July 8, the band announced an acoustic compilation album entitled 07102010, which was released through Rise Records on July 10, 2020. The album celebrates the 10 year anniversary of the band's first show together, and includes acoustic renditions of tracks spanning the band's career. A bonus track entitled "Everything Breaks" that was uploaded as a demo by frontman Andy Leo in 2018 was also included.

=== Dogma and line-up changes (2021–2026) ===
On August 12, 2021, the band released "In Another Life" featuring Courtney LaPlante of Spiritbox, along with its music video. On October 29, the band released "Dancing with the Dead" and its corresponding music video. On January 7, 2022, Crown the Empire announced that their drummer Brent Taddie departed from the band on good terms. On April 13, the band announced Jeeves Avalos, who had toured with the band in late 2021, as their new drummer, 3 years later Avalos was the next person who departed from the band. On December 1, the band published "Immortalize" along with a music video.

On February 23, 2023, the band announced that their fifth studio album, Dogma, would be released on April 28, 2023. At the same time, they released the title track and video for "Dogma", whilst also revealing the album cover and the track list. On March 22, one month before the album release, the band unveiled the fifth single "Black Sheep". The music video for "Superstar" featuring Remington Leith of Palaye Royale was released April 28, 2023, coinciding with the album release. On December 9, 2025, the band announced that long-time bassist Hayden Tree decided to step away from the band in order to fulfill his role as a father.

=== Raw (2026–present) ===
On June 26, 2026. the band released their first new single since 2023 titled "raw", it is the first new song as a duo, with Brandon Hoover handling all instruments, and marks a departure from their metalcore roots, for a more alternative rock sound. In an interview with Valentino Petrarca from The Aquarian, the band stated Turnstile as an influence for the new album. On October 29, 2026, the band released another track, "Violet".

== Band members ==
Current

- Andrew "Andy Leo" Rockhold – lead vocals (2010–present); keyboards, programming (2012–present)
- Brandon Hoover – lead guitar (2010–2011, 2014–present); backing vocals (2010–present); rhythm guitar (2011–2015, 2017–present); bass (2010, 2011, 2012, 2025–present), drums (2011, 2025–present);

Former

- Devin Detar – bass (2010)
- Alex Massey – drums, percussion (2010–2011)
- Brandon Shroyer – bass (2010–2011)
- Austin Duncan – keyboards, programming (2010–2012)
- Bennett "Benn Suede" Vogelman – lead guitar, backing vocals (2011–2015); bass (2012)
- Dave Escamilla – co-lead vocals (2012–2017); rhythm guitar (2014–2017)
- Brent Taddie – drums, percussion (2011–2021)
- Jeeves Avalos – drums (2022–2025; touring member 2021)
- Hayden Tree – bass (2010, 2011–2012, 2012–2025); co-lead vocals (2010–2011, 2017–2025); backing vocals (2015–2017); rhythm guitar (2010–2011)

Touring

- Zac Johnson – co-lead vocals, bass (2011–2012)
- Brendan Barone – co-lead vocals (2012)
- Jayden Mermella – drums (2025–2026)
- Jeff Keylor – bass, co-lead vocals (2025–present)
- Mike McKerracher – drums (2026–present)

Timeline

== Discography ==
- The Fallout (2012)
- The Resistance: Rise of The Runaways (2014)
- Retrograde (2016)
- Sudden Sky (2019)
- Dogma (2023)
