= Upon a Burning Body =

American metalcore band

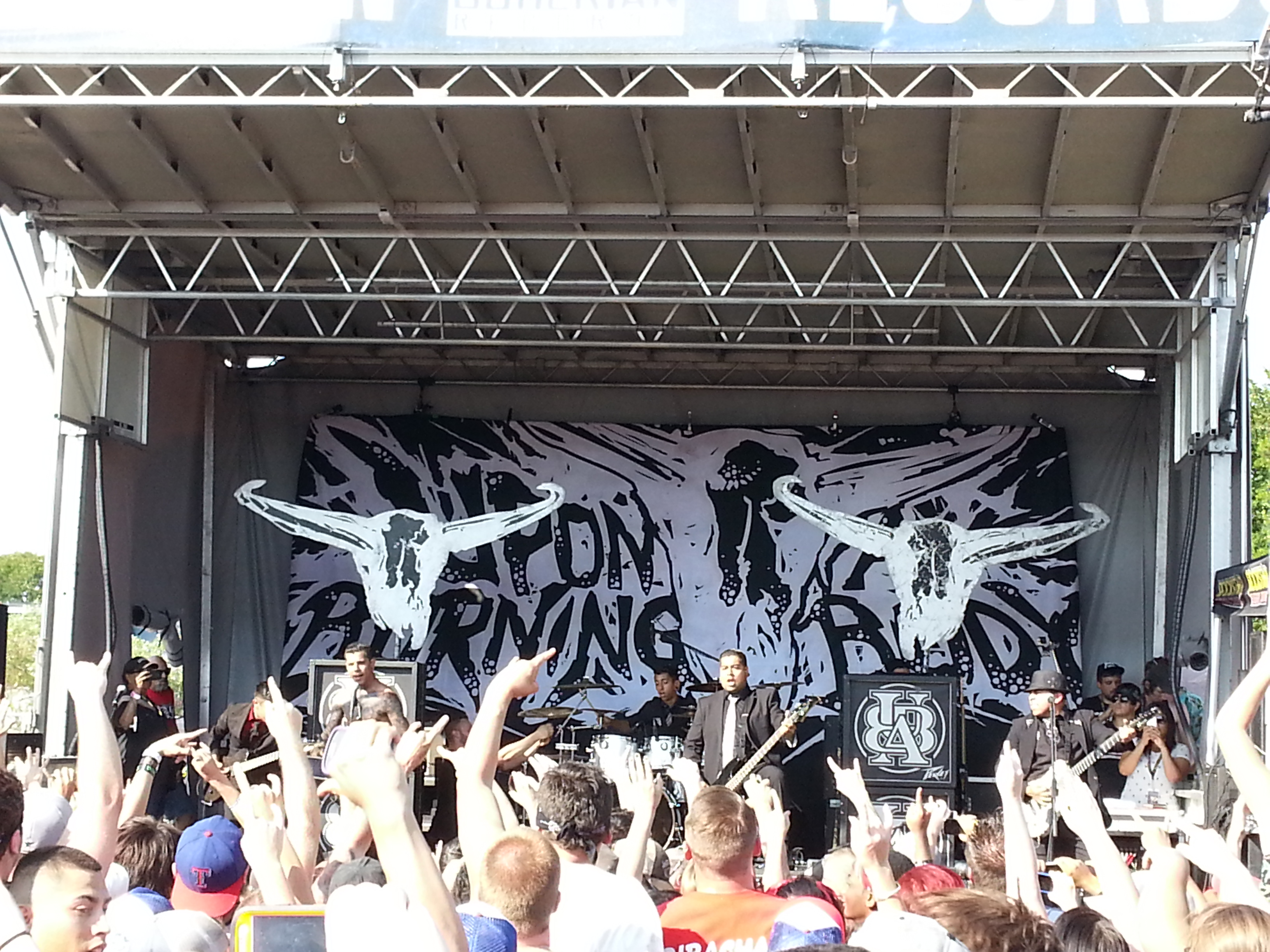
- Upon a Burning Body at Mayhem Festival 2014

Background information
- Also known as: UABB
- Origin: San Antonio, Texas, U.S.
- Genres: Metalcore; groove metal; deathcore
- Years active: 2005–present
- Labels: Sumerian; Seek & Strike
- Members: Danny Leal; Ruben Alvarez; Thomas Alvarez; Juan Hinojosa
- Past members: Juan Hinojosa; Tito Felix; Chris "CJ" Johnson; Seth Webster; Jonathon Gonzales; Ramon "Lord Cocos" Villarreal; Sal Dominguez; Rey Martinez; Joe Antonellis
- Website: uponaburningbody.com

Upon a Burning Body is an American metalcore band from San Antonio, Texas, formed in 2005. It currently consists of vocalist Danny Leal, guitarist Ruben Alvarez and bassist Thomas Alvarez.

After releasing their debut album The World Is Ours in 2010, they followed it up with their second studio album, Red. White. Green., which debuted at No. 105 on the Billboard 200 in 2012. Their third studio album The World Is My Enemy Now, released on August 12, 2014, performed even better, debuting at No. 39 on the Billboard 200 of that year. In the same year, they joined Five Finger Death Punch on their tour as a support act. The band released their fourth studio album Straight from the Barrio on October 28, 2016. The band is currently independent as of 2023.

== Members ==
Current

- Danny Leal – lead vocals (2005–present)
- Ruben Alvarez – rhythm guitar (2012–present); backing vocals (2005–present); lead guitar (2015–present); bass (2005–2012, 2016–2017)
- Thomas Alvarez – bass, backing vocals (2020–present)
- Juan Hinojosa – drums, percussion (2005–2008, 2011, 2025–present)

Former

- Chris "CJ" Johnson – rhythm guitar (2005–2012)
- Seth Webster – bass (2012–2013)
- Jonathon Gonzales – drums, percussion (2011–2013)
- Ramon "Lord Cocos" Villarreal – drums, percussion (2008–2011, 2013–2014)
- Sal Dominguez – lead guitar (2005–2015)
- Rey Martinez – bass (2013–2016)
- Joe Antonellis – bass (2017–2020)
- Tito Felix – drums, percussion (2014–2025)

Timeline

== Discography ==
=== Studio albums ===
Album details	Peak chart positions					
Album details	US	US Heat	US Indep	US Hard Rock	US Rock	UK Rock
The World Is Ours: Release date: April 6, 2010; Label: Sumerian	—	28	—	—	—	—
Red. White. Green.: Release date: April 10, 2012; Label: Sumerian	105	1	20	11	35	—
The World Is My Enemy Now: Release date: August 12, 2014; Label: Sumerian	39	—	6	3	12	18
Straight from the Barrio: Release date: October 28, 2016; Label: Sumerian	—	—	12	8	22	—
Southern Hostility: Release date: June 7, 2019; Label: Seek & Strike	—	—	—	—	—	—
Fury: Release date: May 6, 2022; Label: Seek & Strike	—	—	—	—	—	—
Blood of the Bull: Release date: December 5, 2025; Label: Independent	—	—	—	—	—	—

=== Extended plays ===
- Genocide (2005)
- Built from War (2020)

=== Singles ===
- "Sin City" (2012)
- "Once Upon a Time in Mexico" (2012)
- "Scars" (2014)
- "Red Razor Wrists" (2014)
- "Bring the Rain" (2014)
- "Til the Break of Dawn" (2016)
- "Already Broken" (2016)
- "Remenissions" (2018)
- "King of Diamonds" (2019)
- "Reinventing Hatred" (2019)
- "All Pride No Pain" (2019)
- "Built from War" (2020)
- "5x3" (2020)
- "Chains of Agony" (2020)
- "Snake Eyes" (2021)
- "An Insatiable Hunger" (2023)
- "Killshot" (2023)
- "Another Ghost" (2024)
- "Sk8 or Die" (2024)
- "Dragged Through Glass" (2025)
- "Daywalker" (2025)
- "Hand of God" (2025)

=== Demos ===
- Upon a Burning Body (2005)
