= Diviner (band) =

Greek heavy metal band

Diviner are a Greek heavy metal band founded by long-time collaborators Yiannis Papanikolaou (vocals) and Thimios Krikos (guitar) in 2011. The band released the album Fallen Empires in November 2015. In 2019 they released their second album called Realms of Time. In 2023 they released a third album, Avaton.
