= Retrograde (album) =

Studio album by Crown the Empire
- Released: July 22, 2016
- Length: 38:18
- Label: Rise
- Producer: Drew Fulk

Crown the Empire chronology
The Resistance: Rise of The Runaways (2014)	Retrograde (2016)	Sudden Sky (2019)

Singles from Retrograde
- 1. "Zero" Released: June 10, 2016; 2. "Weight of the World" Released: July 12, 2016; 3. "Hologram" Released: July 15, 2016

Retrograde is the third studio album by American metalcore band Crown the Empire. It was released on July 22, 2016, through Rise Records and was produced by Drew Fulk. The album debuted at number 15 on the Billboard 200. This is the first album the band released without lead guitarist Benn Suede, as well as the last album before co-lead vocalist Dave Escamilla left the band in January 2017.

Professional ratings
Review scores
Source	Rating
AllMusic	3.5/5 stars
CaliberTV	9.4/10
New Noise	3.5/5 stars
Rock Sound	7/10 stars

== Track listing ==
No.	Title	Length
1.	"SK-68"	1:40
2.	"Are You Coming with Me?"	3:49
3.	"Zero"	3:02
4.	"Aftermath"	3:50
5.	"Hologram"	3:45
6.	"The Fear Is Real"	3:24
7.	"Lucky Us"	3:43
8.	"Weight of the World"	3:27
9.	"Signs of Life"	3:54
10.	"Oxygen"	4:09
11.	"Kaleidoscope"	3:28
Total length:		38:18

Target Exclusive bonus tracks
No.	Title	Length
12.	"For Days"	5:02
13.	"Mercury"	4:17
Total length:		47:37

== Personnel ==
Credits adapted from AllMusic.

Crown the Empire

- Andrew "Andy Leo" Rockhold – lead vocals, keyboards, programming
- Dave Escamilla – co-lead vocals, rhythm guitar
- Brandon Hoover – lead guitar, backing vocals
- Hayden Tree – bass, backing vocals
- Brent Taddie – drums, percussion

Additional personnel

- Drew Fulk – production, engineering, mixing, composition
- Josh Strock – engineering, composition
- Chris Athens – mastering
- Chris Baseford – drum engineering
- Jeff Dunne – drum editing, mixing assistance
- Brendan Barone – creative consultant, composition
- Stevie Aiello – composition
- Sean Heydorn – A&R

== Charts ==
Chart (2016)	Peak position
Australian Albums (ARIA)	53
UK Rock & Metal Albums (OCC)	12
US Billboard 200	15
US Top Hard Rock Albums (Billboard)	1
US Independent Albums (Billboard)	1
US Top Rock Albums (Billboard)	1

=== Year end charts ===
Chart (2016)	Position
US Top Hard Rock Albums	43
