= Tengger Cavalry =

Chinese heavy metal band

- Tengger Cavalry in 2016

Background information
- Origin: Inner Mongolia; Beijing, China
- Genres: Folk metal; Mongolian music; heavy metal
- Years active: 2010–2018; 2018–2019
- Labels: Metal Hell Records (2012); M-Theory Audio (2017); Napalm (2018–2019)
- Past members: Nature G; Patrick Reilly; Randy Tesser; Greg Baker; Tamir Hargana; Yuri Liak; Alex Abayev; Josh Schifris; Zaki Ali; Robert McLaughlin; Borjigin Chineeleg; Uljmuren De; Phillip Newton

Tengger Cavalry was a folk metal band originating from Inner Mongolia and Beijing in China and based in New York and Texas. They combined elements of the traditional music of Central Asia and Mongolia with heavy metal into a kind of folk metal that Billboard and CNN referred to as "nomadic folk metal".

Tengger Cavalry was active from 2010 until 2019, when its founder, Nature Ganganbaigal, died. During this time, they released 14 studio albums, three EPs, and two compilations. The band also recorded game soundtracks for Civilization 6 and Doom Eternal.

== History ==
Tengger Cavalry was founded in March 2010 as a one-man project by Nature Ganganbaigal, a musician and composer from Beijing, China, who named it after the ancient Mongolic and Turkic deity Tengri.

The band released their debut album, Blood Sacrifice Shaman, the same year, and followed with Cavalry Folk in 2011 and Sunesu Cavalry in 2012. That year, a feature by the British music magazine Terrorizer gave the band a wider international audience.

Tengger Cavalry went on to issue several more albums, including Blood Sacrifice Shaman in 2015, Cavalry in Thousands and Ancient Call in 2016, Die on My Ride in 2017, and Cian Bi in 2018.

On 27 February 2018, it was announced that the band had broken up. Less than five months later, Ganganbaigal stated that they were back together, and a year later, they issued album, Northern Memory, Vol. 1 and Northern Memory, Vol. 2.

On 24 June 2019, Tengger Cavalry announced that Ganganbaigal had died of undisclosed causes.

== Band members ==
Final lineup

- Nature G – rhythm guitar, throat singing, morin khuur (2010–2019)
- Patrick Reilly – lead guitar (2018–2019)
- Randy Tesser – drums (2018–2019)
- Greg Baker – bass guitar, double bass (2018–2019)
- Tamir Hargana – morin khuur, Tuvan throat singing (2018–2019)

Former

- Yuri Liak – drums (2015)
- Alex Abayev – bass (2015–2018)
- Josh Schifris – drums (2016–2017)
- Zaki Ali – drums (2017–2018)
- Robert McLaughlin – igil, shanz, throat singing (2015)
- Borjigin Chineeleg – throat singing, topshur, jawharp (2017–2018)
- Uljmuren De – morin khuur (2016–2018)
- Phillip Newton – topshur, backing vocals (2017–2018)

== Discography ==
=== Studio albums ===
- Blood Sacrifice Shaman (2010)
- Cavalry Folk (2011)
- The Mantra (2011)
- Sunesu Cavalry (2012)
- The Expedition (2013)
- Black Steed (2013)
- Blood Sacrifice Shaman (2015)
- Cavalry in Thousands (2016)
- Ancient Call (2016)
- Die on My Ride (2017)
- Cavalry from Hell (2017)
- War Horse (2017)
- Cian Bi (2018)
- Northern Memory, Vol. 1 (2019)

=== Compilations ===
- Grassland Rock (2016)
- Soundtrack of the Cavalry (2016)

=== EPs ===
- kAAn (2016)
- Mountain Side (2016)
- Northern Memory, Vol. 2 (2019)

=== Singles ===
- "War Horse" (2018)
- "A Blade of Time"
- "Heart" (2016)

=== Videos ===
- "Independence Day"
- "KAAN"
- "War Horse"
- "Mountain Side"

== Awards ==
- Global Music Awards – silver award for Best Music Video: "Mountain Side" (2016)
- The Academia Music Awards – Best Heavy Metal Song: "Independence Day" (2017)
