= The Resistance: Rise of The Runaways =

Studio album by Crown the Empire
- Released: July 22, 2014
- Recorded: 2014
- Studio: Metro 37 Studios, Rochester, Michigan, U.S.
- Genre: Metalcore; post-hardcore; progressive rock
- Length: 50:58
- Label: Rise
- Producer: Dan Korneff

Crown the Empire chronology
The Fallout (2012)	The Resistance: Rise of The Runaways (2014)	Retrograde (2016)

Singles from The Resistance: Rise of The Runaways
- 1. "Initiation" Released: June 19, 2014; 2. "Rise of the Runaways" Released: July 3, 2014; 3. "Bloodline" Released: November 1, 2014; 4. "Prisoners of War" Released: September 8, 2015

The Resistance: Rise of The Runaways is the second studio album by American metalcore band Crown the Empire. The album was released on July 22, 2014, through Rise Records and was produced by Dan Korneff. It is the band's first album to not feature keyboardist Austin Duncan, as well as the last album to feature lead guitarist Benn Suede, who departed from the band in 2015. It is also the last concept album the band have written.

== Background and recording ==
It was announced by the band's label, Rise Records, that they would be going into a studio in Michigan on January 3, 2014, with Joey Sturgis producing the album. Later the next month, the band released a teaser for a new song to be featured on the album. The same month they released a statement revealing that they had completed recording drums and were continuing with the other instruments, and also that producer Dan Korneff will also be aiding in the band's production.

== Composition ==
=== Themes ===
The album serves as a sequel to the band's debut album The Fallout and is set hundreds of years after the album. It follows the story of the Runaways, a group of rebels who overthrow oppressive regimes.

== Release and promotion ==
The album was officially announced on June 18 by the band and was given the title The Resistance: Rise of The Runaways, a release date of July 22 and its artwork was also released. The announcement was made on the official YouTube channel of Rise Records with a teaser trailer, which, along with the title, release date and artwork, also contained a teaser for a track from the upcoming album. A day later, the first single and second track "Initiation" was released.

After the album's release, the band supported the British rock band Asking Alexandria in the UK throughout October and November.

== Critical reception ==
Professional ratings
Aggregate scores
Source	Rating
Metacritic	82/100
Review scores
Source	Rating
AllMusic	3.5/5 stars
Alternative Press	4.5/5 stars
Big Cheese	7/10
Bring the Noise	8/10
Kerrang!	4/5 stars
Mind Equals Blown	8/10
New Noise	4/5 stars
Outburn	9/10
Rock Sound	7/10
SF Media	4.5/5 stars

The Resistance: Rise of The Runaways was welcomed with positive reception by critics. Review aggregator Metacritic gave the album an 82 out of 100 based on 4 professional reviews, citing "universal acclaim". In a four-and-a-half star review from Alternative Press, Phil Freeman said, "Crown The Empire have stepped up in a big way, with every aspect of The Resistance: Rise of The Runaways coming across bigger, harder and just more than their full-length debut". Rob Sayce at Rock Sound said "Talk about impeccable timing. In its propensity for Hollywood-style melodrama and barrage of arena-friendly hooks, Crown The Empire's second album is both relentlessly on trend and yet relatively individual, succeeding where previous effort The Fallout so often faltered", bestowing a seven out of ten upon the work. In a three-and-a-half star review from AllMusic, Gregory Heaney claimed, "Crown the Empire widen their dynamic range with the simultaneously soaring and punishing... In fact, this theatricality is easily the album's most engaging feature, making The Resistance: Rise of The Runaways a unique offering in an otherwise dull post-hardcore landscape."

Lais Martins Waring for Big Cheese stated "The Resistance probably won't change any lives, but Crown the Empire should be proud of their second album, because it's pretty damn enjoyable. They're onto a good thing here. Keep an eye on them", awarding the album a seven out of ten. In a nine out of ten review for Outburn, Brooke Daly said "The highlight of The Resistance: Rise of The Runaways is the musicianship... The album sounds progressive while maintaining their core sound. They have honed it, creating a thrilling album in the process." Nathaniel Lay of New Noise remarked "Rise of The Runaways is a bit more deliberate and elaborate in design... an album of fair size, and therefore offers plenty of content... The Resistance is also certainly a worthy release for its scene. Crown the Empire are most definitely talented musicians, and they could be onto something here. Maybe in an album or two, they'll become unstoppable", conferring a four star rating upon the project. Thomas Doyle of Kerrang! gave the album four K's out of a possible five, praising the concept album for not trying to be too clever and resulting in overblown monstrosities, and goes on to say that it feels energised and packed with the energy and spirit of metalcore music with an added narrative.

In an eight out of ten review for Mind Equals Blown, Emma Guido heralded; "From what it looks like, The Resistance has proved that they are capable of creating a storm, or rather a rebellion, in the music scene. They have a unique style, incredible talent, and a faithful fan base, making this breakthrough band the next big thing." Matthew Sievers articulated how "The Resistance is another staple in this band's already blazing career that will push them so far into the limelight, they'll be rubbing their eyes in disbelief", giving the project four and a half stars. In an eight out of ten review at Bring the Noise, Matt Borucki said "The Resistance: Rise of The Runaways is more mature and more sophisticated, yet still holds the youthful glow that turned heads in the first place."

== Commercial performance ==
The album sold more than 24,000 copies in its debut week of August 9, 2014 by Billboard, whilst the album charted at No. 7 on the Billboard 200. It also debuted at No. 1 on the Top Rock Albums and Hard Rock Albums chart. The album has sold 72,000 copies in the United States as of July 2016.

== Track listing ==
All tracks are written by Crown the Empire, Brendan Barone, and Bennett Vogelman

No.	Title	Length
1.	"A Call to Arms (Act I)"	3:01
2.	"Initiation"	4:40
3.	"Millennia"	3:44
4.	"Machines"	4:29
5.	"The Wolves of Paris (Act II)"	1:42
6.	"MNSTR"	3:29
7.	"Second Thoughts"	3:42
8.	"Maniacal Me"	3:33
9.	"Satellites (Act III)"	2:07
10.	"Rise of the Runaways"	3:35
11.	"Bloodline"	4:20
12.	"The Phoenix Reborn"	5:45
13.	"Johnny's Rebellion"	6:45
Total length:		50:58

Deluxe edition bonus tracks
No.	Title	Length
14.	"Prisoners of War"	3:55
15.	"Cross Our Bones"	3:25
16.	"Machines" (re-invented)	4:02
17.	"Millennia" (acoustic)	4:03
Total length:		66:23

== Personnel ==
Credits adapted from AllMusic.

Crown the Empire

- Andrew "Andy Leo" Rockhold – lead vocals, keyboards, programming
- Dave Escamilla – co-lead vocals, additional guitar on "Rise of the Runaways"
- Bennett "Benn Suede" Vogelman – lead guitar, backing vocals, additional production, mixing
- Brandon Hoover – rhythm guitar, backing vocals
- Hayden Tree – bass
- Brent Taddie – drums, percussion

Additional musicians

- Bailey Crego of The White Noise – additional guitar
- Dave Eggar – cello
- Rachel Golub – violin
- Chip Lambert – percussion

Additional personnel

- Dan Korneff – production, engineering
- Brendan Barone – additional production, composition, creative direction, instrumentation, vocals
- Alex Prieto – additional production
- Nathan Cannon – mixing, vocals
- Kris Crummett – mixing
- Joey Sturgis – mastering
- Crown the Empire – composition, instrumentation
- Stevie Aiello – composition
- Derek Brewer – management
- JJ Cassiere and Tom Taaffe – booking

== Charts ==
Chart (2014)	Peak position
US Billboard 200	7
US Top Hard Rock Albums (Billboard)	1
US Independent Albums (Billboard)	1
US Top Rock Albums (Billboard)	1
UK Albums (OCC)	184
UK Rock & Metal Albums (OCC)	16

=== Year-end charts ===
Chart (2014)	Position
US Top Hard Rock Albums	34

== Release history ==
Region	Date	Format	Label	Catalog no.
Worldwide	July 22, 2014	CD	Rise	RR 2392
Worldwide	July 22, 2014	Digital download	Rise	819531015397
Worldwide	July 22, 2014	LP	Rise	RR 2391
