= Nature Ganganbaigal =

Chinese musician and composer (c. 1989–2019)

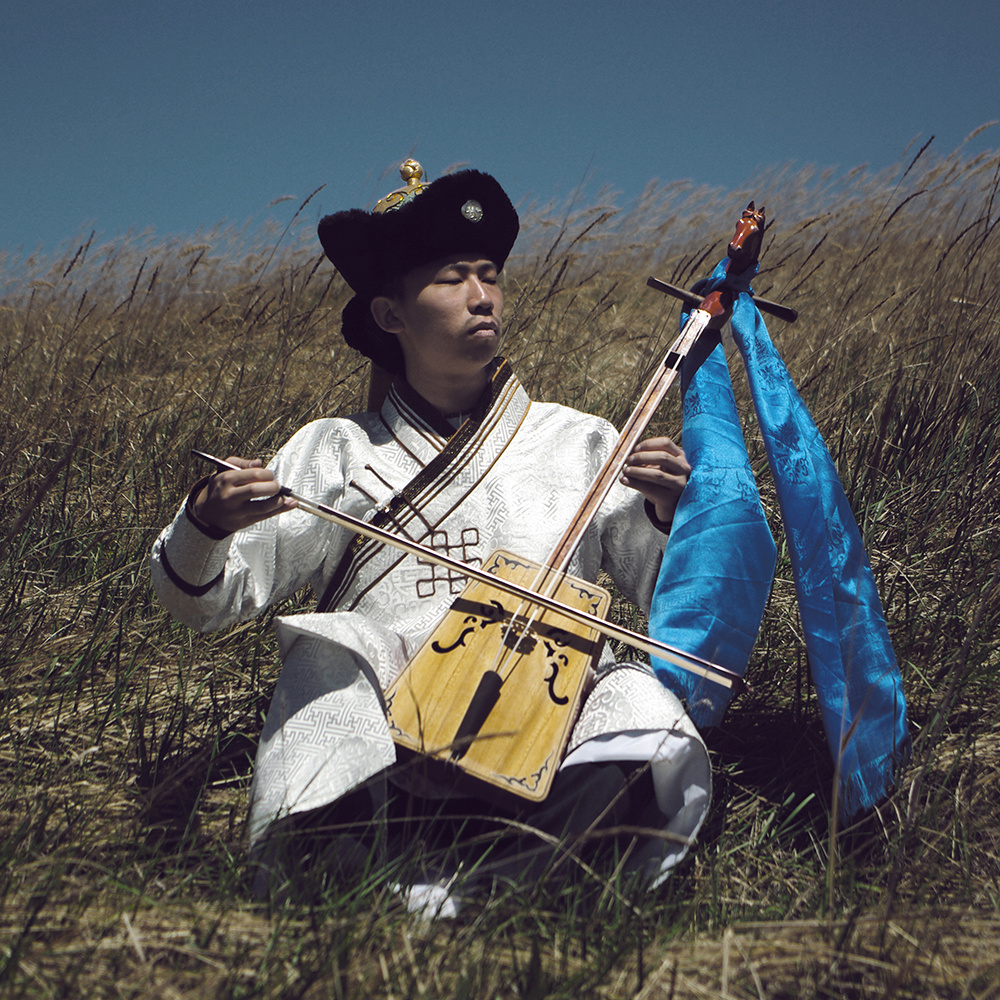

Background information
- Also known as: Nature G
- Born: Zhang Tianran (CN), Ganganbaigal (MN) c. 1989
- Origin: Beijing, China
- Died: June 13, 2019 (aged 29)
- Genres: Mongolian music, soundtrack, world music, heavy metal
- Occupations: Film composer, video game composer, music producer
- Instruments: Guitar, morin khuur, dombra
- Years active: 2009–2019
- Formerly of: Tengger Cavalry

Nature Ganganbaigal (c. 1989 – June 13, 2019) was a Mongol and Chinese music performer, songwriter, producer and film music composer based in New York City. Originally from Beijing, he was of mixed Han Chinese and Mongol ancestry, and performed Mongolian Morin Khuur and throat singing. His western name "Nature" comes from both of his given names, Mongolian Ganganbaigal 'beautiful nature' and Chinese Tianran 'nature'. He graduated from New York University in 2015, holding a master of music degree in film music composition.

In 2010, Nature created the Mongolian folk rock/metal band Tengger Cavalry, which has been featured on Billboard, CNN, Vice, MTV, and Chicago Reader.

In 2014, his solo album received a bronze medal from Global Music Awards and a nomination from Hollywood Music in Media Awards. In 2015 Nature was nominated for Best Original Score by Los Angeles Independent Film Festival Awards.

In 2015, he appeared on the stage of Lincoln Center and held a sold-out concert at Carnegie Hall with Tengger Cavalry.

On June 24, 2019, it was announced Ganganbaigal had died; his body was found by authorities on June 13. The cause of death was not publicized. He previously had a suicide attempt in December 2017. Ganganbaigal contributed to the soundtrack to video games Civilization VI, Age of Empires IV, and Doom Eternal. Doom's publisher Bethesda Softworks added an In Memoriam to Ganganbaigal at the end of their behind the scenes special for the soundtrack.
