= Diego Farias (musician) =

American musician

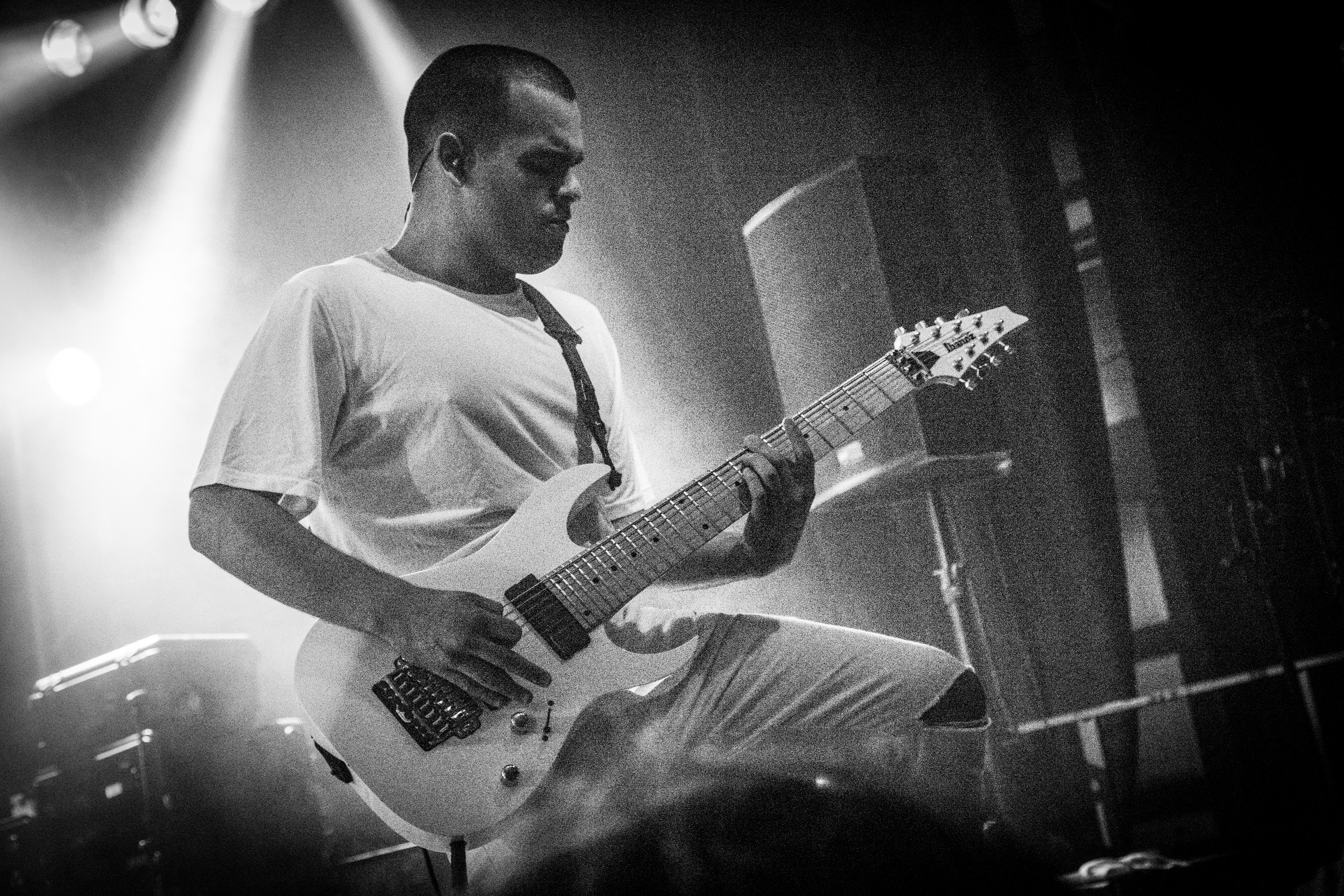
- Farias performing with Volumes in 2016

Background information
- Also known as: Yaygo
- Born: c. 1992 or 1993; Los Angeles, California
- Died: February 6, 2020 (aged 27)
- Genres: Progressive metal
- Occupations: Guitarist, producer
- Years active: 2009–2020
- Formerly of: Volumes

Diego Farias was a producer and musician best known as the founding guitarist for the progressive metalcore band Volumes.

== Early life ==
Farias was born in Los Angeles, California. His father, Gustavo, works in the music industry as a producer. Farias began playing guitar at the age of 11, allowing him to begin experimenting with Pro Tools.

== Career ==
Farias co-founded the band Volumes in January 2009 with Daniel Braunstein. His brother, Gus, was a vocalist in the band. He played guitar on the band's albums Via, No Sleep and Different Animals. Farias also programmed and engineered those three Volumes' albums and the band's two EPs.

In addition to Volumes, he also has engineering credits for vocal production on Stray from the Path's Rising Sun, Structures' Divided By, additional production work on Veil of Maya's Matriarch, and mixing and bass and drum engineering for Chelsea Grin's Ashes to Ashes. Farias also worked with Animals as Leaders.

Outside of metal music, Farias worked with Lil Gnar on Fire Hazard, 88Rising on its Head in the Clouds compilation album, and programmed and mixed for Juan Gabriel on Los Dúo, Vol. 2. He produced Jake Paul's It's Everyday Bro, which earned a platinum RIAA certification.

Farias left Volumes in January 2020, dying shortly after in February 2020.

In March 2024, Ameonna (a band consisting of former members of Chelsea Grin) released a song called "Last Respects", which paid tribute to Farias.

== Equipment ==
Farias played Ibanez RGD and RG guitars using EMG pickups.

== Recognition ==
Farias was the recipient of a Latin Grammy, winning the award for his production work on Los Dúo, Vol. 2, an album by Juan Gabriel.
