= When You're Alone =

When You're Alone may refer to:

- "When You're Alone", a song by Betraying the Martyrs on their 2011 album Breathe in Life
- "When You're Alone", a song by Bruce Springsteen on his 1987 album Tunnel of Love
- "When You're Alone", a song by John Williams for the 1991 film Hook
- "When You're Alone", a song by Rivers Cuomo on his 2011 album Alone III: The Pinkerton Years
- "When You're Alone", a song by Self on their 1996 album The Half-Baked Serenade

== See also ==
- When You're Alone, You're Not Alone, a 2004 EP by Forgive Durden
