= Subliminal Criminals =

Studio album by Stray from the Path
- Released: August 14, 2015
- Genres: Metalcore; hardcore punk; nu metal; rap metal
- Length: 32:54
- Labels: Sumerian; UNFD
- Producer: Will Putney

Stray from the Path chronology
Anonymous (2013)	Subliminal Criminals (2015)	Only Death is Real (2017)

Subliminal Criminals is the seventh studio album by the American rap metal band Stray from the Path. The album was released on August 14, 2015, by Sumerian Records and distributed by UNFD in Australia and New Zealand.

== Lyrical themes ==
The guitarist Tom Williams said that the track "Outbreak" is about "the health industry and how illness is a business. Every year there is a new disease to be afraid of, more money to be made off of cancer treatments, and more prescriptions written." Williams elaborated on the album's lyrical themes further in an interview with MusicFeeds.au, saying that the lyrics "are very sardonic and very sarcastic." According to Williams, "Badge & a Bullet Part II" is about "people making arguments in which they lie to themselves and try to convince themselves that deaths related to police brutality aren’t linked to race. “Don’t call it a race issue!” People need to understand that there is a huge breakdown between minorities and police." The song "D.I.E.P.I.G." attacks musicians who use their fame to abuse underage fans, including Ian Watkins of Lostprophets and the singer-songwriter Front Porch Step, both of whom were directly referred to in the lyrics.

== Track listing ==
No.	Title	Length
1.	"The New Gods"	3:05
2.	"Outbreak"	3:04
3.	"Badge & a Bullet, Pt. II"	3:30
4.	"First World Problem Child" (featuring Sam Carter of Architects)	3:04
5.	"Shots Fired"	3:44
6.	"Eavesdropper" (featuring Rou Reynolds of Enter Shikari)	3:20
7.	"D.I.E.P.I.G"	2:33
8.	"Future of Sound" (featuring Cody B. Ware)	1:52
9.	"Time Bomb"	2:43
10.	"Snap"	2:44
11.	"These Things Have to Fall Apart"	3:22
Total length:		32:54

== Reception ==
In a review of the album, Brenton Harris of Music Feeds wrote, "As with previous recent releases from the band Subliminal Criminals wears both its hardcore and RATM influences on its sleeve, but on the whole the record doesn't sound like a retread of either sound, being too heavy to be branded a RATM knockoff and too varied to be dismissed as generic hardcore. ... Eight albums in, the revolution is upon us, and its impact will be far from subliminal." The album was included at number 17 on Rock Sound's top 50 releases of 2015 list.

== Personnel ==
- Andrew Dijorio – vocals
- Tom Williams – guitars
- Anthony Altamura – bass guitar, vocals
- Dan Bourke – drums

== Charts ==
Chart (2015)	Peak position
Australian Albums (ARIA)	53
US Billboard Independents Albums	13
US Billboard Alternative Albums	18
US Billboard Hard Rock Albums	6
US Billboard Rock Albums	24

== Bibliography ==
- Bird, Ryan, ed. (January 2016). "Top 50 Releases of the Year". Rock Sound (208). London: Freeway Press Inc. ISSN 1465-0185.
