= Life Through a Window =

2014 album by Structures

Studio album by Structures
- Released: May 13, 2014
- Recorded: September – October 2013
- Studio: The Machine Shop, Belleville, NJ
- Genre: Metalcore, djent
- Length: 40:27
- Label: Sumerian
- Producer: Will Putney, Randy Leboeuf

Structures chronology
Divided By (2011)	Life Through a Window (2014)	None of the Above (2021)

Singles from Life Through a Window
- 1. "The Worst of Both Worlds" Released: April 4, 2014; 2. "Extinction" Released: April 15, 2014

Life Through a Window is the second studio album by Canadian metalcore band Structures released on May 13, 2014 by Sumerian Records. It was produced by Will Putney and Randy Leboeuf, and recorded at the Machine Shop in Belleville from September to October 2013. It was the last album produced before the band's indefinite hiatus.

== Background and promotion ==
The first single of the album "The Worst of Both Worlds" featuring guest vocals by Drew York from Stray from the Path was released on April 4, 2014. On April 15, the band released their second single "Extinction". A music video for their track "Earth Gazing" was released on June 19. The album was then released on May 13, the track "Follower" contains guest vocals from then-vocalist of Northlane – Adrian Fitipaldes. The album artwork contains the cover of their debut EP All of the Above in the background.

The band had planned to make an appearance at the 2014 AllStars Tour, however they were barred from entering the US by border security for unknown reasons. In August, the band played at Hevy Fest in the UK. On October 18, Structures issued a statement via their Facebook that they were going on an indefinite hiatus after performing a Farewell Tour in December. They also announced that founding vocalist Nick Xourafas would return to perform one last tour with the band.

== Composition ==
The genres of the album has been described as death metal, heavy metal, metalcore, and tech metal. The album was also criticized for sounding too similar to Stray from the Path.

== Critical reception ==
Professional ratings
Review scores
Source	Rating
AllMusic	3/5 stars
Dead Press	8/10 stars
Heavy Blog is Heavy	1/5 stars
Kill the Music	6/10
KillYourStereo	85/100
The Prelude Press	4.5/5
SputnikMusic	3.5/5 stars

The album received mixed to favorable reviews. Matt Sievers from KillYourStereo rated it 85/100, saying: " If you like your music full-on, heavy, powerful or strongly influenced, this record will most likely find a home on your shelf or iTunes library." AllMusic gave it a favorable review, calling their range: "...more to offer the world than just angsty diary scribblings and atonal, palm-muted harmonics." Dead Press in a positive review, described the album as: "a record which bludgeons as ruthlessly as anyone in the game, thrusting forth both a sonic and emotionally textured statement which displays them as genuine future contenders." Kill the Music rated the album lower, saying: "The album kept us on our toes in the opening acts but in the end let listeners down. Whether it was the Stray From the Path borderline copy-cat/ influence scenerio [sic], to the poor song structure." In a favorable review, SputnikMusic said the album was: "not the Structures you know and that's a good thing." Heavy Blog is Heavy gave the album a negative review calling it "...further degeneration in the life of an already weakened genre." In a positive review from The Prelude Press, Sam Lang said: "Structures’ musical approach remains the same; struggles with reality, inner-torment and regret/guilt feed this beast as thundering breakdowns and chaos-inspired guitar riffs leave you gasping for air."

== Track listing ==
Track listing adapted from Spotify.

All tracks are written by Structures.

No.	Title	Length
1.	"Buried"	3:04
2.	"Nothing to Lose"	3:49
3.	"The Worst of Both Worlds" (featuring Drew York)	3:20
4.	"My Conscience"	3:36
5.	"Broken Telephone"	3:51
6.	"Extinction"	2:52
7.	"Alien"	3:31
8.	"Requiem"	4:20
9.	"Earth Gazing"	3:37
10.	"Follower" (featuring Adrian Fitipaldes)	3:49
11.	"Life Through a Window"	4:38
Total length:		40:27

== Personnel ==
Credits retrieved from AllMusic.

Structures

- Brendon Padjasek – lead guitar, bass, vocals
- Spyros Georgiou – rhythm guitar
- Andrew McEnaney – drums, art direction

Additional musicians

- Andrew Dijorio (Stray from the Path) – guest vocals on track 3
- Adrian Fitipaldes (Northlane) – guest vocals on track 10

Production

- Will Putney – engineering, mastering, mixing, producer
- Randy Leboeuf – bass engineering, engineering, producer
- Andy Gomoll – editing
- Tom Smith – editing
- Brendan Williams – editing
- Shawn Keith – A&R
- Daniel McBride – layout
- Daniel Wagner – art direction, artwork
- Spencer MacLean – photography

== Charts ==
Chart (2014)	Peak position
US Hard Rock (Billboard)	21
US Heatseekers (Billboard)	9
