= Only Death Is Real =

Studio album by Stray from the Path
- Released: September 8, 2017
- Genre: Metalcore; hardcore punk; nu metal
- Length: 29:35
- Label: Sumerian; UNFD
- Producer: Will Putney

Stray from the Path chronology
Subliminal Criminals (2015)	Only Death Is Real (2017)	Internal Atomics (2019)

Only Death Is Real is the eighth studio album by American metalcore band Stray from the Path. The album was released on September 8, 2017, by Sumerian Records and distributed by UNFD in Australia and New Zealand.

It's the first album from the band to feature former Brutality Will Prevail and Dead Swans drummer Craig Reynolds after joining in 2016.

== Track listing ==
No.	Title	Length
1.	"The Opening Move"	1:29
2.	"Loudest in the Room"	2:31
3.	"Goodnight Alt-Right"	3:06
4.	"Let's Make a Deal"	2:53
5.	"They Always Take the Guru"	2:17
6.	"Plead the Fifth"	3:40
7.	"Strange Fiction" (featuring Keith Buckley of Every Time I Die)	3:09
8.	"All Day & a Night" (featuring Bryan Garris of Knocked Loose)	3:22
9.	"The House Always Wins" (featuring Vinnie Paz of Jedi Mind Tricks)	4:01
10.	"Only Death is Real"	3:03
Total length:		29:35

== Personnel ==
- Andrew Dijorio – vocals
- Tom Williams – guitars
- Anthony Altamura – bass
- Craig Reynolds – drums
