= Via (Volumes album) =

Studio album by Volumes
- Released: September 27, 2011; June 29, 2016 (re-release)
- Genre: Progressive metalcore
- Length: 50:12
- Label: Mediaskare; 91367
- Producer: Diego Farias; Daniel Braunstein

Volumes chronology
The Concept of Dreaming (2010)	Via (2011)	No Sleep (2014)

Via is the debut studio album by American progressive metalcore band Volumes. It was initially released on September 27, 2011 through Mediaskare Records.

The album was re-released in 2016 independently under the 91367 Records moniker, remastered and with a new cover. However, the album's fifth track, "Serenity", originally contained a solo towards the end of the song, but it was removed from the remastered edition of the album, likely due to label issues relating to Chris Letchford of Scale the Summit performing the solo on the album's original edition.

== Track listing ==
All music is composed by Volumes.

No.	Title	Length
1.	"Paid in Full"	3:59
2.	"Wormholes"	5:33
3.	"Limitless"	3:02
4.	"Reversion"	1:49
5.	"Serenity" (featuring Chris Letchford of Scale the Summit)	4:41
6.	"The Columbian Faction"	4:31
7.	"Affirmation of Ascension"	4:49
8.	"Intake"	5:26
9.	"Behind the Curtain"	4:26
10.	"Recovery"	1:33
11.	"Edge of the Earth"	4:54
12.	"Via"	5:29
Total length:		50:12

== Personnel ==
Volumes

- Gus Farias – vocals
- Michael Barr – vocals
- Diego Farias – lead guitar, programming, production, engineering, editing, mixing
- Daniel Schwartz – rhythm guitar, clean vocals, drum programming
- Raad Soudani – bass

Additional musicians

- Chris Letchford of Scale the Summit – guest guitar solo on track 5

Additional personnel

- Daniel Braunstein – production, programming, engineering, editing, mixing
- Zack Ohren – mastering

== Charts ==
Chart (2011)	Peak position
US Heatseekers Albums (Billboard)	26
