= Villains (Stray from the Path album) =

Studio album by Stray from the Path
- Released: May 13, 2008
- Recorded: 2007
- Studios: God City Studio, Salem, Massachusetts
- Genres: Metalcore, hardcore punk
- Length: 20:14
- Labels: Sumerian Records, Victory Records
- Producer: Kurt Ballou

Stray from the Path chronology
Our Oceania (2005)	Villains (2008)	Make Your Own History (2009)

Villains is the third studio album by American metalcore band Stray from the Path, released on May 13, 2008, through Sumerian Records and Victory Records. The album was recorded at God City Studio in Salem, Massachusetts, and produced by Kurt Ballou, guitarist for Converge. It marked a significant stylistic shift for the Long Island quintet, departing from their earlier technical metalcore sound in favour of a more direct and stripped-down hardcore approach.

== Recording and production ==
Villains was recorded in 2007 at God City Studio in Salem, Massachusetts. The album was produced, engineered, and mixed by Kurt Ballou, the guitarist for metalcore veterans Converge, who established God City Studio in 1998 and built it into one of the foremost recording environments for heavy music in the northeastern United States. The year 2008 represented one of Ballou's most productive periods as a producer; Decibel magazine placed five of his productions in their annual top 40 list that year, with releases from Torche, Genghis Tron, Blacklisted, Have Heart, and Trap Them also among his 2008 output.

== Music and themes ==
Villains represents a marked departure from Stray from the Path's earlier technical metalcore approach. Where prior releases featured layered, complex arrangements, Villains trades that intricacy for brevity and directness, with its eleven tracks completing in just over twenty minutes. Writing in Teeth of the Divine, reviewer Benjamin DeBlasi characterised the shift as a move away from "bombastic, technical metalcore in favour of a much more stripped, direct approach," situating the band closer to the raw post-hardcore energy of acts such as later-era Every Time I Die, Refused, and Botch.

Vocalist Drew York's delivery throughout the album has been compared to that of Botch frontman Dave Verellen, drawing on a similarly cathartic, frenzied register, while the guitar work of Tom Williams and John Kane incorporates angular, rhythmically dissonant riffing akin to Botch's approach on We Are the Romans. Critics also noted that the album repeatedly suggests an imminent descent into heavier, more concussive passages that the band consistently withholds, generating a sustained tension across the record.

== Reception ==
Critical response to Villains acknowledged the album's energy while noting the challenges posed by its brevity. Teeth of the Divine's Benjamin DeBlasi described it as "a classic love/hate scenario," observing that the "potency in each piece is a burning, vibrant energy" but that many tracks conclude before the listener can fully engage with them, as "each track ends barely before you have been able to duly latch onto it." He identified "The Art of Reprisal" as one of the album's strongest moments, calling it "a cannoning, squalling train wreck" and the track most effectively marrying the album's intensity with a degree of structural development. DeBlasi described the album as "a brave move," noting that such pronounced stylistic shifts in heavy music carry inherent risk, and concluded by raising questions about the creative direction the band would pursue on subsequent releases.

== Track listing ==
No.	Title	Length
1	"Callous"	1:41
2	"Villain"	2:33
3	"To Vanish"	2:13
4	"The White Flag"	1:42
5	"Superstructure"	1:40
6	"Soviet"	1:45
7	"Lessons in Freud"	1:41
8	"The Art of Reprisal"	1:41
9	"The Spectre and His Mantra"	1:04
10	"Capital"	2:08
11	"Ataxia"	2:08
Total length:		20:14

== Personnel ==
=== Band ===
- Andrew "Drew York" Dijorio – lead vocals
- Tom Williams – lead guitar
- John Kane – guitar
- Frank Correira – bass guitar
- Justin Manas – drums

=== Production ===
- Kurt Ballou – producer, engineer, mixer
