= The Resilient =

Studio album by Betraying the Martyrs
- Released: 27 January 2017
- Genre: Metalcore; symphonic metal
- Length: 48:04
- Label: Sumerian
- Producer: Justin Hill

Betraying the Martyrs chronology
Phantom (2014)	The Resilient (2017)	Rapture (2019)

Singles from The Resilient
- 1. "The Great Disillusion" Released: 27 July 2016; 2. "Won't Back Down" Released: 13 November 2016; 3. "Lost for Words" Released: 30 November 2016

The Resilient is the third studio album by French metalcore band Betraying the Martyrs. It was released on 27 January 2017 through Sumerian Records and was produced by Justin Hill. It is the band's first release with drummer Boris le Gal.

== Background and recording ==
On 25 February 2016, Betraying the Martyrs announced that they are working on new material for the forthcoming album. On 26 February, the band revealed more informations about recording sessions of the album. On 16 March, they shared a teaser of new song from the studio through their social media accounts.

On 26 March, Betraying the Martyrs shared more studio clips of new songs. On 11 April, the band have concluded the recording sessions for their new album. On 21 July, they released a preview for their first single "The Great Disillusion". On 30 November, they revealed the album itself, the album cover, the track list, and release date.

== Critical reception ==
Professional ratings
Review scores
Source	Rating
Already Heard	2/5 stars
Distorted Sound	7/10
Ghost Cult	9/10
Louder Sound	3.5/5 stars
Rock Sins	8.5/10

The album received mixed to positive reviews from critics. Already Heard rated the album 2 out of 5 and: "The main musical crime committed here is that it becomes somewhat tiresome. After twelve tracks of monotonous riffs and unmemorable hooks, each song appears to seamlessly blend into one another. Unfortunately, Betraying the Martyrs cement themselves as another carbon copy metalcore band that has surfaced countless times before." Sam Dignon of Distorted Sound scored the album 7 out of 10 and said: "So whilst it does falter a bit towards the end The Resilient still shows that Betraying the Martyrs are continuing to improve with each album. The increased focus on the more symphonic sound has certainly helped whilst never compromising on the heavier elements. It might not be a game changing record but The Resilient certainly worth checking out if you are into the more theatrical side of heavy music." Ghost Cult gave the album 9 out of 10 and stated: "A fantastic effort which firmly puts Betraying the Martyrs on the European metal map."

Louder Sound gave the album a positive review and stated: "The album is relentlessly textured, and while there are cheesy moments – the strings, and the Imperial March-style piano intro on 'Won't Back Down' – listening to The Resilient is as satisfying as sticking your head out of a car window on a particularly windy day." Simon Crampton Rock Sins rated the album 8.5 out of 10 and said: "If you have never heard of Betraying the Martyrs or have found yourself on the fence about them, then I really suggest you change that by giving this album a good spin, prepare to be impressed and have some of the catchiest choruses you will hear in heavy music all year. This album is so good, in fact, that we are even prepared to let them off for that Frozen cover."

== Track listing ==
Adapted from Apple Music.

No.	Title	Length
1.	"Lost for Words"	3:59
2.	"Take Me Back"	4:50
3.	"The Great Disillusion"	4:15
4.	"Dying to Live"	3:45
5.	"The Resilient"	4:09
6.	"Unregistered"	4:22
7.	"Won't Back Down"	4:10
8.	"(Dis)Connected"	4:13
9.	"Behind the Glass"	3:20
10.	"Waste My Time"	3:28
11.	"Ghost"	3:31
12.	"Wide Awake"	3:58
Total length:		48:04

== Personnel ==
Betraying the Martyrs

- Aaron Matts – lead vocals
- Lucas D'Angelo – lead guitar, backing vocals
- Baptiste Vigier – rhythm guitar
- Valentin Hauser – bass
- Boris le Gal – drums
- Victor Guillet – keyboards, clean vocals

Additional personnel

- Justin Hill – production
