= Euthanasia (Stray from the Path album) =

Studio album by Stray from the Path
- Released: September 9, 2022
- Genres: Hardcore punk; metalcore; post-hardcore
- Length: 38:45
- Label: UNFD
- Producer: Will Putney

Stray from the Path chronology
Internal Atomics (2019)	Euthanasia (2022)	Clockworked (2025)

Singles from Euthanasia
- 1. "Bread & Roses" Released: August 3, 2022; 2. "Needful Things" Released: September 9, 2022

Professional ratings
Review scores
Source	Rating
Boolin Tunes	9/10
Distorted Sound	8/10
Kerrang!	4/5
New Transcendence	9.5/10

Euthanasia is the tenth studio album by American hardcore punk band Stray from the Path. It was released on September 9, 2022, via UNFD in LP, CD and digital formats. "Needful Things" was released as a single on the day of the album's release, alongside a music video.

The making of the album was fraught with strife due to the COVID-19 pandemic. The band would send each other ideas but would find that they would go long periods of time without playing their instruments. Craig Reyonlds would drum on Twitch during this time and was later joined by Tom Williams on guitar. This avenue helped re-fire their passion for performance. However, Reynolds injured his back in an accident shortly after writing was finished, postponing recording by four months.

== Track listing ==
Euthanasia track listing
No.	Title	Length
1.	"Needful Things"	3:59
2.	"May You Live Forever"	3:15
3.	"III"	4:08
4.	"Guillotine"	3:35
5.	"Chest Candy"	2:45
6.	"Bread & Roses" (featuring Jesse Barnett from Stick to Your Guns)	3:45
7.	"Law Abiding Citizen"	4:12
8.	"The Salt in Your Spit"	3:14
9.	"Neighbourhood Watch"	3:17
10.	"Ladder Work"	6:35
Total length:		38:45

== Personnel ==
- Andrew Dijorio – vocals
- Tom Williams – guitars
- Anthony Altamura – bass
- Craig Reynolds – drums
