= Anonymous (Stray from the Path album) =

Stray from the Path album

Studio album by Stray from the Path
- Released: September 17, 2013
- Recorded: The Machine Shop
- Genre: Metalcore; hardcore punk; rap metal
- Length: 38:01
- Label: Sumerian
- Producer: Will Putney

Stray from the Path chronology
Rising Sun (2011)	Anonymous (2013)	Subliminal Criminals (2015)

Professional ratings
Review scores
Source	Rating
Alternative Press	3.5/5 stars
Dead Press!	8/10
Exclaim!	5/10

Anonymous is the sixth studio album by the American hardcore punk band Stray from the Path. The album was released on September 17, 2013, by Sumerian Records. The album was announced on July 17, 2013, after the website whereisourliberty.com was revealed to be a promotion tool for the album. A new song, "Badge & a Bullet," was released along with the announcement of the album.

The album debuted at #40 on the Billboard 200 album chart.

== Critical reception ==
AllMusic wrote that the album "blends the political ferocity of Rage Against the Machine with the feral, punk-metal intensity of Agnostic Front." Exclaim! wrote that "most of the album's triumphs come when Stray From the Path keep the energy high, as on previous outings."

== Track listing ==
No.	Title	Length
1.	"False Flag"	4:11
2.	"Badge & a Bullet"	4:25
3.	"Radio" (featuring Jesse Barnett of Stick to Your Guns)	3:21
4.	"Scissor Hands" (featuring Jason Butler of letlive.)	4:02
5.	"Black Friday"	2:54
6.	"Counting Sheep"	3:13
7.	"Slice of Life"	3:21
8.	"Tell Them I'm Not Home"	3:31
9.	"Landmines" (re-recorded)	5:07
10.	"Anonymous"	3:56
Total length:		38:01

== Personnel ==
Stray from the Path

- Andrew "Drew York" Dijorio – vocals
- Thomas Williams – guitar
- Anthony "Dragon Neck" Altamura – bass guitar, backing vocals
- Dan Bourke – drums

Guest musicians

- Jesse Barnett – vocals (track 3)
- Jason Aalon Butler – vocals (track 4)

Production

- Will Putney – production, engineering, mixing, mastering
- Dan McBride – concept and artwork (alongside Stray from the Path), photo
- Taylor Aubin – photo
- Kiowa Gordon – model
