= Structures (band) =

Canadian metal band

- Origin: Toronto, Ontario, Canada
- Genres: Metalcore; djent; progressive metal
- Years active: 2009–2014, 2021–present
- Label: Sumerian
- Members: Brendon Padjasek; Spyros Georgiou; Andrew McEnaney
- Past members: Spencer MacLean; Nick Xourafas

Structures (stylized as STRUC/TURES) is a Canadian metalcore band from Toronto, formed in 2009. Their current line-up consists of guitarists Spyros Georgiou and Brendon Padjasek, who also performs vocals and bass, and drummer Andrew McEnaney. They have released two studio albums: Divided By (2011) and Life Through a Window (2014). After reforming in 2021, they released an EP titled None of the Above.

== History ==
=== Early years and All of the Above (2009–2010) ===
The band was formed in early 2009 after vocalist Nick Xourafas, guitarist Spyros Georgiou and bassist Spencer MacLean, who previously played in a band called Charity's, met guitarist Brendon Padjasek and drummer Andrew McEnaney, both in other bands from Toronto and founded the band Structures with them. On April 6, 2010, the band released their debut EP All of the Above, which they had produced themselves and distributed independently. In October, they went on tour across Canada with bands such as Abandon All Ships, Woe, Is Me, and Liferuiner. They performed their EP tracks "Encounter" and "In Pursuit Of".

=== Record label and Divided By (2011–2013) ===
During a tour of North America in June 2011, Structures announced they had been signed onto Sumerian Records and planned to release a debut album. On October 4, their debut single "Hydroplaning" was released, it was later included on their debut album. On October 25, the band's debut studio album Divided By was released as planned via Sumerian Records. It was produced by Will Putney at the Machine Shop recording studio. On November 12, the album peaked at No. 12 on the Billboard Heatseekers charts. Between April and May 2012, the band played with Veil of Maya, Betraying the Martyrs and Vildhjarta on their first tour of Europe. In November, the band played in Europe again next to Parkway Drive, Emmure and The Word Alive. In May 2013, the band played another tour of Canada with Texas in July, Northlane and Intervals. In late-May, while preparing for the then upcoming Australian and New Zealand tour, vocalist Nick Xourafas was unable to attend due to issues with his passport. The band's tour manager Alex Lidstone temporarily assumed vocalist duties for the tour.

=== Life Through a Window and hiatus (2014–2021) ===
In March 2014, a month before releasing their new single "The Worst of Both Worlds" featuring guest vocals by Drew York from Stray from the Path, the band parted ways with vocalist Nick Xourafas due to personal issues, bassist Spencer MacLean later followed. Guitarist Brendon Padjasek then took over vocalist duties as well as continuing to play guitar. On April 15, the band released their second single "Extinction". A music video for their track "Earth Gazing" was released on June 19. Their sophomore studio album, Life Through a Window, was released on May 12. Like their first album, it was also produced by Will Putney at the Machine Shop recording studio. On May 31, the album peaked at No. 21 on the Billboard 200's Hard Rock albums, and also peaked at No. 9 on the Heatseekers charts. On July 7, while on their Allstars Tour, the band were denied entrance into the US due to unforeseen issues. On July 12, the band tweeted an apology stating that they would be unable to attend.

On October 18, Structures issued a statement via their Facebook that they were going on an indefinite hiatus after performing a Farewell Tour in December. They also announced that founding vocalist Nick Xourafas would return to perform one last tour with the band. The possibility of a reunion was not ruled out. After two years of rumors, Structures released a teaser for a planned collaboration with Volumes in February 2015, however there had been no update since. However, in June 2016, Volumes confirmed that the project was effectively dead calling it "a fun idea, but [they were] all onto other things at [that] point."

During their indefinite hiatus, former drummer Andrew McEnaney begun focusing more on his electronic side-project, Sex Tape, he also joined Will Putney's band, END. McEnaney left END in March 2020 and was replaced by Billy Rymer. In 2018, former guitarist and temporary lead vocalist Brendon Padjasek joined Australian metalcore band Northlane, replacing their former bassist Alex Milovic and also performing backing vocals. Padjasek left Northlane in March 2021.

=== Return and None of the Above (2021–present) ===
On June 4, 2021, Structures posted a band photo with the caption "June 9, 2021", leading to speculation of a reunion announcement. On the aforementioned date of June 9, the band confirmed they had reunited and released a new song titled "Planet of Garbage". The following day, the band announced a new EP titled None of the Above, which released on July 9. The six-track EP features additional vocals from Brendan Murphy of Counterparts on the track "6" and Michael Barr of Volumes on the track "Civilian".

On December 3, 2021, the band released the instrumental editions of Divided By and Life Through a Window.

== Members ==
Current

- Spyros Georgiou - guitars (2009–2014, 2021–present)
- Andrew McEnaney - drums (2009–2014, 2021–present)
- Brendon Padjasek - guitars (2009–2014, 2021–present), unclean vocals (2014, 2021–present), bass (2014, 2021–present), backing vocals (2009–2014)

Former

- Spencer MacLean - bass, clean vocals (2009–2014)
- Nick Xourafas - unclean vocals (2009–2014, 2014)

Timeline

== Discography ==
=== Studio albums ===
List of studio albums
Title	Album details	Peak chart positions	
Title	Album details	US Rock	US Heat
Divided By	Released: October 25, 2011; Label: Sumerian; Format: CD, digital download	–	12
Life Through a Window	Released: May 12, 2014; Label: Sumerian; Format: CD, digital download	21	9
"—" denotes a recording that did not chart.

=== Extended plays ===
List of extended plays
Title	EP details
All of the Above	Released: April 6, 2010; Label: Self-released; Format: CD, digital download
None of the Above	Released: July 9, 2021; Label: Self-released; Format: CD, LP, digital download

=== Singles ===
Title	Year	Album
"Hydroplaning"	2011	Divided By
"The Worst of Both Worlds"	2014	Life Through a Window
"Extinction"	2014	Life Through a Window
"Planet of Garbage"	2021	None of the Above

=== Music videos ===
Year	Song	Director
2012	"Paralyzed___"	Justin McConnell
2014	"Earth Gazing"	Unknown
2021	"Planet of Garbage"	Brendon Padjasek
