= Phantom (Betraying the Martyrs album) =

Studio album by Betraying the Martyrs
- Released: 15 July 2014
- Studio: D'Angelo Sound Studio, Paris, France; Konscious Studios, Santa Monica, California; Quasar Studio, Rouen
- Genre: Deathcore; metalcore; symphonic metal; djent
- Length: 44:32
- Label: Sumerian
- Producer: Lucas D'Angelo

Betraying the Martyrs chronology
Breathe in Life (2011)	Phantom (2014)	The Resilient (2017)

Singles from Phantom
- 1. "Where the World Ends" Released: 28 May 2014; 2. "Jigsaw" Released: 17 June 2014; 3. "Let It Go" Released: 14 July 2014

Phantom is the second studio album by French metalcore band Betraying the Martyrs. The album was released on 15 July 2014 through Sumerian Records. It is the band's only album to feature drummer Mark Mironov.

== Background ==
The first song to be released from the album was "Where the World Ends", released on 28 May 2014. The song was first performed live on 25 May in Lyon, France. On 17 June, a lyric video for the second single, "Jigsaw", was released.

"Let It Go" is a cover of the song from the 2013 film, Frozen. The cover was critically acclaimed, with AllMusic contributor Gregory Heaney stating that the cover conveys the same emotion as the original (sung by Idina Menzel) while radically altering the delivery, adding that it "feels like a testament to both the versatility of metal and the universality of show tunes." Heavy metal website MetalSucks labelled the cover as "truly exceptional" in an otherwise negative review of the album. However, Under the Gun named the cover as their "least metal moment of the week" on 14 July. The cover became one of the band's most popular songs and has accumulated 8.5 million views on YouTube, as of April 2022.

The song "Legends Never Die" is a tribute dedicated to late Suicide Silence vocalist Mitch Lucker, who agreed to appear on one of the album's tracks on 31 October but died a day later in an accident.

Professional ratings
Review scores
Source	Rating
AllMusic	3.5/5 stars
MetalSucks	1.5/5 stars
Rock Sound	8/10
Ultimate Guitar	5.7/10

== Track listing ==
All songs written and composed by Betraying the Martyrs, except "Let It Go", which was originally written by Robert Lopez and Kristen Anderson-Lopez.

No.	Title	Length
1.	"Jigsaw"	3:54
2.	"Where the World Ends"	3:58
3.	"Walk Away"	3:41
4.	"Let It Go" (Idina Menzel cover)	4:22
5.	"L'abysse Des Anges"	3:46
6.	"Phantom (Fly Away)" (featuring Gus Farias of Volumes)	3:25
7.	"What's Left of You"	3:39
8.	"Afterlife"	2:12
9.	"Legends Never Die"	4:07
10.	"Lighthouse"	3:22
11.	"Your Throne"	1:03
12.	"Our Kingdom"	3:05
13.	"Closure Found"	3:58
Total length:		44:32

== Personnel ==
Betraying the Martyrs

- Aaron Matts – lead vocals
- Lucas D'Angelo – lead guitar, backing vocals, production, engineering
- Baptiste Vigier – rhythm guitar
- Valentin Hauser – bass
- Mark Mironov – drums
- Victor Guillet – keyboards, piano, synthesizers, clean vocals

Additional musicians

- Gus Farias of Volumes – guest vocals on track 6

Additional personnel

- Betraying the Martyrs and Nick Walters – vocal production
- Allan Hessler – vocal engineering, vocal production
- Theophile Denis – drum engineering
- Nicolas Delestrade – mastering, mixing
- George Vallee – publicity
- Daniel McBride – artwork, layout
- Ann Buster – band photo
