= Different Animals =

Studio album by Volumes
- Released: June 9, 2017
- Genres: Progressive metalcore; djent; nu metal
- Length: 35:05
- Label: Fearless
- Producers: Brandon Paddock; Diego Farias

Volumes chronology
No Sleep (2014)	Different Animals (2017)	Happier? (2021)

Singles from Different Animals
- 1. "Feels Good" Released: June 16, 2016; 2. "On Her Mind" Released: February 17, 2017; 3. "Left for Dead" Released: April 21, 2017; 4. "Finite" Released: June 9, 2017

Different Animals is the third studio album by American progressive metalcore band Volumes, released on June 9, 2017, through Fearless Records. It is the first album to feature former Bury Your Dead vocalist Myke Terry as co-vocalist, and the only album to not feature founding co-vocalist Michael Barr. The album was also the final studio album with co-vocalist Gus Farias and guitarist Diego Farias.

== Track listing ==
All music is composed by Volumes.

No.	Title	Length
1.	"Waves Control"	2:49
2.	"Finite"	3:48
3.	"Feels Good"	3:50
4.	"Disaster Vehicle"	2:38
5.	"Pieces"	3:17
6.	"Interlude"	0:56
7.	"Hope"	3:26
8.	"Tide's Change"	1:46
9.	"On Her Mind" (featuring Pouya)	3:43
10.	"Heavy Silence"	2:17
11.	"Pullin' Shades"	4:12
12.	"Left for Dead"	2:16
Total length:		35:05

== Personnel ==
Volumes

- Myke Terry – vocals
- Gus Farias – vocals
- Diego Farias – guitars, programming, production, engineering
- Raad Soudani – bass, programming
- Nick Ursich – drums

Additional musicians

- Pouya – rapping on track 9

Additional personnel

- Brandon Paddock – production, programming, engineering
- Chris Athens – mastering
- Kyle Black – mixing, additional engineering

== Charts ==
Chart (2017)	Peak position
US Top Rock Albums (Billboard)	49
US Top Hard Rock Albums (Billboard)	9
US Top Album Sales (Billboard)	62
