= Rapture (Betraying the Martyrs album) =

Studio album by Betraying the Martyrs
- Released: 13 September 2019
- Genre: Metalcore; symphonic metal
- Length: 41:05
- Label: Sumerian
- Producer: Henrik Udd

Betraying the Martyrs chronology
The Resilient (2017)	Rapture (2019)	Silver Lining (2022)

Singles from Rapture
- 1. "Eternal Machine" Released: 7 March 2019; 2. "Parasite" Released: 26 June 2019; 3. "Down" Released: 30 August 2019

Rapture is the fourth and final studio album by French metalcore band Betraying the Martyrs. It was released on 13 September 2019 through Sumerian Records and was produced by Henrik Udd. It is the band's first release with lead guitarist Steeves Hostin. It is the last album to feature the band's vocalist Aaron Matts before he left the band in April 2021. It is also their last album to be released on this label before the band signed to Out of Line Music in October 2021, and their final studio album overall before their breakup in 2023.

== Background and recording ==
On 18 September 2018, Betraying the Martyrs announced that they replaced lead guitarist Lucas D'Angelo with Steeves Hostin. At the same time, they are working on new material for the forthcoming album. On 5 March 2019, they shared a teaser of new song from the album through their social media accounts. On 26 June, they revealed the album itself, the album cover, the track list, and release date.

== Critical reception ==
Professional ratings
Review scores
Source	Rating
Blabbermouth.net	7/10
Distorted Sound	5/10
Exclaim!	7/10
New Transcendence	Positive

The album received mixed to positive reviews from critics. Jay H. Gorania from Blabbermouth.net gave the album 7 out of 10 and said: "Rapture is, thus far, Betraying the Martyrs' crowning achievement. In spite of its questionable track sequencing and relatively lackluster start, the Frenchmen's improved technicality and more prominent black metal inspired symphonic flourishes successfully augment the act's bedrock of bruising breakdowns. In short, the ingredients are familiar and par for the course, but like any veteran chef would do, the tailoring of expected flavors is thoughtful and consequently memorable. Perhaps most importantly, Rapture's diversity opens the door for a variety of approaches that will likely make sense their next go around." Kris Pugh of Distorted Sound scored the album 5 out of 10 and said: "Though Betraying the Martyrs tick several of the boxes on the checklist of metalcore, they're yet to produce a work of art that puts them as front runners in the genre. And Rapture does little for the band outside of chucking in a couple of decent breakdowns, and impressive guitar lines into their back catalogue. If you were wondering why Betraying the Martyrs most noteworthy moment in the spotlight by some distance was their cover of a wildly popular pop song – Rapture answers that question for you in abundance."

Joe Smith-Engelhardt of Exclaim! gave it 7 out of 10 and said: "While they aren't necessarily bringing anything new to the table, Betraying the Martyrs offer a fresh take on a tried-and-true formula with Rapture. The record has plenty to offer for metalcore fans and helps set them on a path of longevity as they gain more confidence in their sound." New Transcendence gave the album a positive review and saying: "Rapture is an album that'll have you achieving that new record on bench press, dead lift or that 5k you've been practicing for. The ideal album for riding into battle, or standing at your window watching the entire world as you know it, fall apart, and unravel into chaos. As long as you have Forty-one minutes to spare before you are plunged into darkness with it, give Rapture album a listen!"

== Track listing ==
Adapted from Apple Music.

No.	Title	Length
1.	"Ignite"	0:54
2.	"Eternal Machine"	4:28
3.	"Down"	3:26
4.	"The Iron Gates"	4:18
5.	"Parasite"	3:40
6.	"The Sound of Letting You Go"	4:56
7.	"The Swarm"	3:16
8.	"Monster"	4:07
9.	"Imagine"	4:32
10.	"Incarcerated"	2:59
11.	"Rapture"	4:24
Total length:		41:05

== Personnel ==
Betraying the Martyrs

- Aaron Matts – lead vocals
- Steeves Hostin – lead guitar
- Baptiste Vigier – rhythm guitar
- Valentin Hauser – bass
- Boris le Gal – drums
- Victor Guillet – keyboards, clean vocals

Additional personnel

- Henrik Udd – production
