= Mirror Touch =

2025 studio album by Volumes

Studio album by Volumes
- Released: December 12, 2025
- Genres: Progressive metalcore; djent; nu metal
- Length: 39:04
- Label: Fearless
- Producers: Daniel Braunstein; Raad Soudani

Volumes chronology
Happier? (2021)	Mirror Touch (2025)

Singles from Mirror Touch
- 1. "Sidewinder" Released: March 28, 2025; 2. "S.O.A.P." Released: November 3, 2025; 3. "Bad Habit" Released: November 21, 2025

Professional ratings
Review scores
Source	Rating
Kerrang!	2/5

Mirror Touch is the fifth studio album by American progressive metalcore band Volumes. It was released via Fearless Records on December 12, 2025 through streaming services, and was released in physical form on February 27, 2026.

== Composition ==
The opening track and first single, "Sidewinder", was described by co-vocalist Michael Barr as "an unapologetic hate letter to a world gone mad, especially the corruption within the music industry. It offers an unfiltered perspective on a society in chaos, with no optimism or positivity. It's a song that captures the feeling of everything unraveling as we know it." He also mentioned "Bad Habit" being "a song about identifying that habits that are deemed bad for you or unhealthy are sometimes the only thing getting you through life."

"S.O.A.P." was written "about pure and impure indulgence. Good versus evil. Playing with fire or magic — the lines are blurred here. We self-nurture habits that are deemed immoral, although who is the person making that decisions for us?" The final track, "Suffer On", features Black Sheep Wall vocalists Brandon Gillichbauer and Trae Malone. Barr explained that the song "was recorded on our last day in the studio. It was essentially regurgitated out in the most fantastic way the night before I went in to record. This happens never! Very few and far between, something is channelling through you, and you can jot it down within minutes. I. WAS. SO. PUMPED."

== Track listing ==
All tracks are written by Michael Barr, Myke Terry, Raad Soudani, and Nicholas Ursich; "Suffer On" written with Brandon Gillichbauer and Trae Malone.

Mirror Touch track listing
No.	Title	Length
1.	"Sidewinder"	4:00
2.	"Bottom Dollar"	3:18
3.	"Bad Habit"	3:25
4.	"California"	3:44
5.	"Adrenaline"	3:35
6.	"Stitch"	3:29
7.	"S.O.A.P."	3:26
8.	"Dream"	3:55
9.	"Worth It"	4:43
10.	"Suffer On" (featuring Brandon Gillichbauer and Trae Malone)	5:29
Total length:		39:04

== Personnel ==
Credits adapted from Tidal.

=== Volumes ===
- Michael Barr – lead vocals
- Myke Terry – co-lead vocals
- Raad Soudani – guitar, bass guitar, production
- Nick Ursich – drums

=== Additional contributors ===
- Daniel Braunstein – guitar, production, engineering, mixing, mastering
- Brandon Gillichbauer – vocals, songwriting on "Suffer On"
- Trae Malone – vocals, songwriting on "Suffer On"
