= No Sleep (Volumes album) =

Studio album by Volumes
- Released: July 15, 2014; June 29, 2016 (re-release)
- Genres: Progressive metalcore; groove metal
- Length: 33:44
- Labels: Mediaskare; 91367
- Producers: Diego Farias; Misha Mansoor; Brandon Paddock (re-release)

Volumes chronology
| Via (2011) | No Sleep (2014) | Different Animals (2017) |

No Sleep is the second studio album by American progressive metalcore band Volumes, released on July 15, 2014. It is the last album to feature founding member and co-vocalist Michael Barr until his return in 2020, and it is the last to be released under the label Mediaskare Records. The album is a departure from the sound of their previous album, Via, as many of the songs are shorter in length, and contain more clean singing compared to those from the first album.

A lyric video was released for "The Mixture" and the full album was streamed by Mediaskare Records via YouTube.

Along with their 2011 release Via, the album was re-released in 2016 independently under the 91367 Records moniker, remastered and with a new cover. The remastered version omits the outro from the third track, "Erased", for unknown reasons.

== Track listing ==
All music is composed by Volumes.

| No. | Title | Length |
|---|---|---|
| 1. | "The Mixture" | 3:29 |
| 2. | "91367" | 3:01 |
| 3. | "Erased" | 3:35 |
| 4. | "Better Half" | 1:42 |
| 5. | "Across the Bed" | 3:50 |
| 6. | "Pistol Play" | 3:37 |
| 7. | "Vahle" | 5:14 |
| 8. | "Neon Eyes" | 3:22 |
| 9. | "Peace of Mind" | 1:41 |
| 10. | "Up All Night" | 4:13 |
| Total length: | | 33:44 |

== Personnel ==
Volumes

- Michael Barr – vocals
- Gus Farias – vocals
- Diego Farias – guitars, programming, production, mixing, engineering
- Raad Soudani – bass
- Nick Ursich – drums

Additional musicians

- Casey Sabol – additional vocals on track 5, "Across the Bed"

Additional personnel

- Misha Mansoor – production
- Brandon Paddock – production, programming, mixing, engineering
- Wes Hauch – guitar tracking production
- Baron Bodnar – executive production
- Zack Ohren – mastering

== Charts ==
| Chart (2013) | Peak position |
|---|---|
| US Billboard 200 | 40 |
| US Top Hard Rock Albums (Billboard) | 5 |
| US Top Rock Albums (Billboard) | 12 |
