= Happier? =

2021 studio album by Volumes

Studio album by Volumes
- Released: November 19, 2021
- Studio: Butter Music; The Benefit; The Hallway
- Genre: Progressive metalcore; djent; nu metal
- Length: 40:15
- Label: Fearless
- Producer: Raad Soudani; Daniel Braunstein; Max Schad

Volumes chronology
Different Animals (2017)	Happier? (2021)	Mirror Touch (2025)

Happier? is the fourth studio album by American progressive metalcore band Volumes. It was released on November 19, 2021 through Fearless Records. The album was produced by Raad Soudani, Daniel Braunstein and Max Schad.

On June 17, 2022, the band released their third EP entitled Bend(ed), featuring two different takes of the song "Bend" from Happier?. Among them are a stripped down version and a live rendition, in addition to the original studio version of the song.

== Critical reception ==
Professional ratings
Review scores
Source	Rating
Distorted Sound	9/10
Kerrang!	3/5 stars
Wall of Sound	8/10

The album received positive reviews from critics. Dan McHugh of Distorted Sound scored the album 9 out of 10 and said: "The level of consistency and quality held inside Happier? is pretty remarkable considering the sheer level of turmoil that Volumes have had to endure to get to this stage. As the old cliché adequately states 'anything worth having is worth fighting for' and it has certainly brought the best out of this group of musicians. If you were ever in any doubt concerning the longevity of the band then hopefully this release will assist in revitalising your hope for a fruitful future."

Kerrang! gave the album 3 out of 5 and stated: "All in all, it's an album that gives a nod to the band's past while still bringing in new ideas. And will that make fans Happier? Almost certainly…" Wall of Sound gave the album a score 8/10 and saying: "So here comes the big admission, before I took this review on – I'd not actually heard of Volumes. I make this admission embarrassingly too often but it's fun discovering so much great new music. I am so glad I reviewed this album though, I can already tell that 'Get Enough' is my new hyper-fixation-play-all-the-time song. I also like the versatility and obvious talent of this band. Both vocalists effortlessly switch between both the cleans and screams. The instrumentation is fantastic, supports the songs' themes so well, and sounds so cohesive and polished. I know this band has been through a bit of a tumultuous time with in-fighting, line-up changes and tragedy, but from my new-to-the-band point-of-view – they sound like a band hitting their stride. This album is excellent and spoiler alert: it will be in my top albums of the year."

== Track listing ==
Happier? track listing
No.	Title	Writer(s)	Length
1.	"FBX"	Raad Soudani; Michael Barr; Daniel Braunstein; Max Schad; Myke Terry; Nick Ursich	2:31
2.	"Malevolent"	Soudani; Barr; Schad; Terry; Ursich	3:39
3.	"Bend"	Soudani; Barr; Braunstein; Schad; Terry; Ursich	4:18
4.	"Get Enough"	Soudani; Barr; Schad; Terry; Ursich	3:16
5.	"Lets Me Down"	Soudani; Barr; Schad; Terry; Ursich	4:29
6.	"Man on Fire"	Soudani; Barr; Schad; Terry; Ursich	3:03
7.	"Weighted"	Soudani; Barr; Schad; Terry; Ursich	3:43
8.	"See You Again"	Soudani; Barr; Schad; Terry; Ursich	3:05
9.	"Into You (Hurt)"	Soudani; Barr; Braunstein; Schad; Terry; Ursich	4:13
10.	"Void"	Soudani; Barr; Schad; Terry; Ursich; Aaron Pauley	2:43
11.	"Happier?"	Soudani; Barr; Braunstein; Schad; Terry; Ursich	5:10
Total length:			40:15

Bend(ed)

EP by Volumes
- Released: June 17, 2022
- Genre: Progressive metalcore; djent; nu metal
- Length: 13:05
- Label: Fearless
- Producer: Raad Soudani; Daniel Braunstein; Max Schad

Bend(ed)
No.	Title	Length
1.	"Bend" (stripped)	4:26
2.	"Bend" (live at Chain Reaction, Anaheim, California; November 20, 2021)	4:19
3.	"Bend"	4:18
Total length:		13:05

== Personnel ==
Credits adapted from the album's liner notes.

=== Volumes ===
- Michael Barr – vocals, additional vocal production
- Myke Terry – vocals
- Raad Soudani – bass, production, recording
- Nick Ursich – drums

=== Additional contributors ===
- Max Schad – production, recording
- Daniel Braunstein – production, recording, mixing, mastering, guitars
- Gabor Toth – artwork
- Sage LaMonica – package design
