= Clockworked =

Studio album by Stray from the Path
- Released: May 30, 2025
- Genres: Hardcore punk; metalcore; nu metal; rap metal
- Length: 30:24
- Label: SharpTone
- Producer: Will Putney

Stray from the Path chronology
Euthanasia (2022)	Clockworked (2025)

Singles from Clockworked
- 1. "Kubrick Stare" Released: February 5, 2025

Clockworked is the eleventh and final studio album by American hardcore punk band Stray from the Path. It was released on May 30, 2025, via SharpTone in LP, CD and digital formats.

Produced by Will Putney, Clockworked was noted by the band to be their final album. In a social media post, the band stated, "This is a mutual decision, there's no bad blood, we love each other and we love you all." "Kubrick Stare" was released as a single on February 5, 2025, alongside a music video.

== Reception ==
Professional ratings
Review scores
Source	Rating
Distorted Sound	8/10
Kerrang	4/5
Metal Hammer	8/10
New Noise	5/5 stars

In a five-star review for New Noise, Lamar Ramos noted Clockworked as "arguably their angriest and tightest record to date." Writing for Kerrang!, Sam Law opined, "there's real vitality, vividity and immediacy to everything. The old-school nu-metal and rap-rock influences are polished and repurposed with sheer indignant brutality."

Ed Walton of Distorted assigned the album a rating of eight, referring to it as "an album that fills us with rage for all the right reasons, it's one hell of a way to sign off on." The album received a rating of eight from Metal Hammer, whose reviewer Nik Young opined, "the chemistry and visceral fury remain as the band harness chaos and tight musicianship."

== Track listing ==
Clockworked track listing
No.	Title	Length
1.	"Kubrick Stare"	3:18
2.	"Fuck Them All to Hell"	2:32
3.	"Shot Caller"	2:54
4.	"Can't Help Myself"	2:35
5.	"Clockworked" (featuring Flo Salfati of Landmvrks)	2:59
6.	"Shocker"	3:30
7.	"Bodies in the Dark" (featuring Jeffrey Moreira of Poison the Well)	3:12
8.	"Can I Have Your Autograph?"	2:52
9.	"You're Not That Guy"	2:50
10.	"A Life in Four Chapters"	3:02
Total length:		30:24

== Personnel ==
- Andrew Dijorio – vocals
- Tom Williams – guitars
- Anthony Altamura – bass
- Craig Reynolds – drums
