= Divided By (album) =

2011 album by Structures

Studio album by Structures
- Released: October 24, 2011
- Studio: The Machine Shop, Belleville, NJ
- Genre: Metalcore, djent, progressive metal
- Length: 32:54
- Label: Sumerian
- Producer: Will Putney

Structures chronology
All of the Above (2010)	Divided By (2011)	Life Through a Window (2014)

Singles from Divided By
- 1. "Hydroplaning" Released: October 4, 2011

Divided By is the debut studio album by Canadian metalcore band Structures, released on October 24, 2011, by Sumerian Records. It was produced by Will Putney and recorded at the Machine Shop in Belleville. It was the only album to feature vocalist Nick Xourafas and bassist Spencer MacLean.

== Background and promotion ==
Their first and only single "Hydroplaning" preceded the album on October 4, 2011. A music video for their track "Paralyzed___" was released on July 10, 2012.

Between April and May 2012, the band played with Veil of Maya, Betraying the Martyrs and Vildhjarta on their first tour of Europe. In November, the band played in Europe again next to Parkway Drive, Emmure and The Word Alive. In May 2013, the band played another tour of Canada with Texas in July, Northlane and Intervals. Later that month they also performed an Australian and New Zealand tour, however their tour manager Alex Lidstone replaced Nick Xourafas, who was unable to attend due to passport issues.

The album was eventually released on October 24 and contains uncredited guest vocals from Despised Icon vocalist Alex Erian and Ion Dissonance vocalist Kevin McCaughey on the track "Clockwork", the track "Relapse; Signs." contained guest vocals from Frankie Palmeri of Emmure.

== Critical reception ==
Professional ratings
Review scores
Source	Rating
Lamb Goat	5/10
New Transcendence	4/5

The album received mixed to favorable reviews. New Transcendence praised the album in a 4/5 review and said: "This album is heavy, in your face, features amazing guest vocalists, and the band is on a great label." David Keevill of Lamb Goat gave it 5/10, noting that it copies many popular metal and metalcore tropes, he also criticized the music production saying "the dreadful clipping and the levels that are amped up beyond belief are almost an album ruiner."

== Track listing ==
Track listing adapted from Spotify.

No.	Title	Length
1.	"Atlas[t]"	2:09
2.	"Hydroplaning"	3:20
3.	"Encounter..."	3:38
4.	"Paralyzed__"	3:34
5.	"In Pursuit of"	3:20
6.	"Clockwork"	2:55
7.	"Relapse; Signs."	2:52
8.	"Tunnel Vision"	2:53
9.	"I.N.T.E.N.T."	4:43
10.	"/"	3:30
Total length:		32:54

== Personnel ==
Credits retrieved from AllMusic.

Structures

- Nick Xourafas – unclean vocals
- Brendon Padjasek – lead guitar, unclean backing vocals
- Spyros Georgiou – rhythm guitar
- Spencer MacLean – bass guitar, clean vocals on tracks 2, 4–6, 9, and 10
- Andrew McEnaney – drums

Additional musicians

- Alex Erian – guest vocals on track 6
- Kevin McCaughey – guest vocals on track 6
- Frank Palmeri – guest vocals on track 7

Production

- Will Putney – engineering, mastering, mixing, producer
- Antoine Lussier – vocal engineer
- Diego Farias vocal engineer
- Jordan Valeriote – vocal engineer
- Jay Sakong – editing
- Alberto de Icaza – editing
- Daniel Wagner – art direction, design
- Shawn Keith – A&R

== Charts ==
Chart (2011)	Peak position
US Heatseekers (Billboard)	12
