= Rising Sun (Stray from the Path album) =

Studio album by Stray from the Path
- Released: August 30, 2011
- Recorded: The Machine Shop, Farias Production Studios, Threshold Studios
- Genre: Metalcore, hardcore punk
- Length: 32:37
- Label: Sumerian
- Producer: Will Putney

Stray from the Path chronology
Make Your Own History (2009)	Rising Sun (2011)	Anonymous (2013)

Professional ratings
Review scores
Source	Rating
Revolver Magazine	3.5/5 stars

Rising Sun is the fifth studio album by the American hardcore punk band Stray from the Path, released on August 30, 2011, by Sumerian Records.

== Track listing ==
No.	Title	Length
1.	"Rising Sun"	2:03
2.	"Death Beds" (featuring Jonathan Vigil of The Ghost Inside)	2:38
3.	"Mad Girl"	3:09
4.	"Bring It Back to the Streets" (featuring Andrew Neufeld of Comeback Kid)	3:05
5.	"iMember"	3:44
6.	"Dead Rabbits"	3:23
7.	"Prey" (featuring Cory Brandan of Norma Jean)	3:22
8.	"Center of Attention"	2:36
9.	"The Laughing Man"	2:19
10.	"The Escape Artist"	3:00
11.	"Crashing Down"	3:18
Total length:		32:37

== Personnel ==
- Andrew Dijorio - vocals
- Tom Williams - guitars
- Anthony Altamura - bass guitar, vocals
- Dan Bourke - drums
- Produced, mixed and mastered by Will Putney
- Engineered by Will Putney, Diego Farias and Taylor Voletz at Farias Production Studios and Threshold Studios
- Vocal production by Ash Avildsen and Shawn Keith
- Artwork and photo by Daniel McBride and Kathy Christensen
- Band photo by Karen Jerzyk
