= Silver Lining (EP) =

EP by Betraying the Martyrs
- Released: 24 June 2022
- Genre: Metalcore; symphonic metal
- Length: 18:22
- Label: Out of Line

Betraying the Martyrs chronology
Rapture (2019)	Silver Lining (2022)

Singles from Silver Lining
- 1. "Black Hole" Released: 14 October 2021; 2. "Swan Song" Released: 28 April 2022; 3. "Mirror" Released: 23 June 2022

Silver Lining is the second EP and final release by French metalcore band Betraying the Martyrs. It was released on 24 June 2022 through Out of Line Music. The EP is the band's only release with vocalist Rui Martins, their only release with the label, and their final release overall before their breakup in 2023.

== Background and recording ==
On 12 October 2021, Betraying the Martyrs announced that they had parted ways with Sumerian Records and signed with Out of Line Music, and welcomed their new vocalist Rui Martins to the band. At the same time, they released the first single "Black Hole" along with a corresponding music video. On 3 November, the band began working on new material for the forthcoming release. 15 November, they have concluded the recording sessions for their new EP. On 1 May 2022, Betraying the Martyrs revealed the EP itself, the EP cover, the track list, and release date.

== Critical reception ==
Professional ratings
Review scores
Source	Rating
Wall of Sound	9.5/10

The EP received generally positive reviews from critics. Wall of Sound gave the album a score 9.5/10 and saying: "Betraying the Martyrs have unleashed an almost perfect metalcore release. It has everything you want from the genre with tight musicianship, complex layering and riffs aplenty. They've also scored a new frontman who delivers all the right emotions and heaviness this band so rightfully deserves. The tracklisting flows like a river and my only gripe is that it isn't longer. If this is just a taste of what's to come, sign me the F**k up for life!"

== Track listing ==
No.	Title	Length
1.	"Black Hole"	3:51
2.	"Pressure"	3:28
3.	"Embers"	3:37
4.	"Mirror"	3:27
5.	"Swan Song"	3:56
Total length:		18:22

== Personnel ==
Betraying the Martyrs

- Rui Martins – lead vocals
- Steeves Hostin – lead guitar
- Baptiste Vigier – rhythm guitar
- Valentin Hauser – bass
- Boris le Gal – drums
- Victor Guillet – keyboards, clean vocals
