= Internal Atomics =

Studio album by Stray from the Path
- Released: November 1, 2019
- Genre: Metalcore; hardcore punk; groove metal; hip-hop
- Length: 31:47
- Label: UNFD
- Producer: Will Putney

Stray from the Path chronology
Only Death Is Real (2017)	Internal Atomics (2019)	Euthanasia (2022)

Singles from Internal Atomics
- 1. "Kickback" Released: August 28, 2019; 2. "Actions Not Words" Released: September 26, 2019

Professional ratings
Review scores
Source	Rating
Kerrang!	4/5
New Transcendence	9.5/10

Internal Atomics is the ninth studio album by American metalcore band Stray from the Path. The album was released on November 1, 2019 by UNFD. The album was produced by Will Putney, his fifth time producing a Stray from the Path album.

"Double Down" features Matt Honeycutt of Kublai Khan. Stray from the Path toured in Australia with said band to promote the album.

== Track listing ==
No.	Title	Length
1.	"Ring Leader"	3:29
2.	"Kickback" (featuring Brendan Murphy of Counterparts)	3:31
3.	"The First Will Be Last"	3:00
4.	"Fortune Teller"	2:42
5.	"Second Death"	3:10
6.	"Beneath the Surface"	3:40
7.	"Something in the Water"	3:30
8.	"Holding Cells for the Living Hell"	2:11
9.	"Double Down" (featuring Matt Honeycutt of Kublai Khan)	2:43
10.	"Actions Not Words"	3:51
Total length:		31:47

== Personnel ==
- Andrew Dijorio – vocals
- Tom Williams – guitars
- Anthony Altamura – bass
- Craig Reynolds – drums
