= The Hurt the Divine the Light =

EP by Betraying the Martyrs
- Released: 18 November 2009
- Recorded: February 2009
- Studio: Artsonor Studios, Paris, France
- Genre: Deathcore; symphonic metal
- Length: 19:57
- Label: Self-released
- Producer: Stéphane Buriez

Betraying the Martyrs chronology
The Hurt the Divine the Light (2009)	Breathe in Life (2011)

The Hurt the Divine the Light is the debut EP by French metalcore band Betraying the Martyrs, released on 18 November 2009. It is the band's only release with vocalist Eddie Czaicki who left the band in mid-2010. The EP sold more than 2,000 copies in France alone.

The lyrics of the EP tells the story of Abram's transition in life to Abraham.

== Track listing ==
No.	Title	Length
1.	"Out of Egypt"	4:06
2.	"The Covenant"	3:39
3.	"The Righteous with the Wicked"	4:40
4.	"The Hurt the Divine the Light"	4:38
5.	"Being Your Servant" (Bonus track)	2:54
Total length:		19:57

== Personnel ==
Betraying the Martyrs

- Eddie Czaicki – lead vocals
- Fabien Clévy – lead guitar
- Baptiste Vigier – rhythm guitar
- Valentin Hauser – bass
- Antoine Salin – drums
- Victor Guillet – keyboards, clean vocals

Additional personnel

- Stéphane Buriez – production, mixing
- Sylvain Biguet – mastering
- Pegaz Design – design
- Steve Josch – cover photo, photography
- Melchiore Ferradou – band photo
