= Make Your Own History =

Studio album by Stray from the Path
- Released: October 26, 2009
- Recorded: February 2009
- Studios: Bulb Studios in Washington, D.C.
- Genres: Hardcore punk, metalcore
- Length: 28:53
- Label: Sumerian
- Producer: Misha Mansoor

Stray from the Path chronology
Villains (2008)	Make Your Own History (2009)	Rising Sun (2011)

Make your own History is the fourth studio album by Stray from the Path, released on October 26, 2009, by Sumerian Records. The song "Damien" was released as a single in July 2010.

== Reception ==
Professional ratings
Review scores
Source	Rating
AbsolutePunk	89%
Pure Grain Audio	8/10

Bring on mixed Reviews stated, "From start to finish, it is a non-stop, blunt, punch to the face. Thankfully though, it is much less dull than other frantic bands out there". The review gave the album a rating of 3.5 out of 5.

== Track listing ==
1. "Lucid Dreaming" - 2:12
2. "Manipulator" - 2:36
3. "Negative and Violent" - 2:56
4. "Mitra" - 2:39
5. "Damien" - 3:19
6. "Fraudulent" - 2:46
7. "The Things You Own End Up Owning You" - 2:11
8. "Comrades" - 3:17
9. "Black Anchor" - 2:19
10. "Nigeria" (featuring Jonathan Vigil of The Ghost Inside) - 1:57
11. "Make Your Own History" - 2:41

== Personnel ==
Stray from the Path

- Andrew "Drew York" Dijorio - lead vocals
- Tom Williams - guitars
- Justin Manas - guitars
- Ryan Thompson - bass guitar
- Dan Bourke - drums

Production

- Misha "Bulb" Mansoor - producer, engineer
- Mike Rashmawi - engineer
- Tyler Voletz - engineer
- Sons of Nero - artwork
