= Breathe in Life =

Studio album by Betraying the Martyrs
- Released: 20 September 2011
- Recorded: April – May 2011
- Studio: Sonic Assault Studios, Cape Coral, Florida
- Genre: Deathcore; metalcore; symphonic metal
- Length: 42:52
- Label: Sumerian; Listenable
- Producer: Charles J. Wall; Betraying the Martyrs

Betraying the Martyrs chronology
The Hurt the Divine the Light (2009)	Breathe in Life (2011)	Phantom (2014)

Singles from Breathe in Life
- 1. "Man Made Disaster" Released: 4 September 2011; 2. "Tapestry of Me" Released: 11 November 2011; 3. "Because of You" Released: 19 July 2012

Alternative cover
- Alternative cover

Breathe in Life is the debut studio album by French metalcore band Betraying the Martyrs, released on 20 September 2011 through record labels Sumerian and Listenable Records. It is the first release to feature current guitarist Lucas D'angelo as well as British-born lead vocalist Aaron Matts. The album was mixed by Charles J. Wall and the cover was created by the band bassist Valentin Hauser. It is the last album by the band to feature Antoine Salin on drums. "Life Is Precious" features guest vocals by Eddie Czaicki, who was the band's original vocalist.

Professional ratings
Review scores
Source	Rating
About.com	3/5 stars

== Track listing ==
No.	Title	Length
1.	"Ad Astra"	1:30
2.	"Martyrs"	4:13
3.	"Man Made Disaster"	4:12
4.	"Because of You"	4:40
5.	"Tapestry of Me"	4:36
6.	"Liberate Me Ex Inferis"	1:50
7.	"Leave It All Behind"	4:56
8.	"Life Is Precious" (featuring Eddie Czaicki)	4:39
9.	"Love Lost"	4:40
10.	"Azalée"	3:44
11.	"When You're Alone" (featuring Kévin Traoré and Steve Garner)	3:52
Total length:		42:52

== Personnel ==
Betraying the Martyrs

- Aaron Matts – lead vocals
- Lucas D'Angelo – lead guitar, backing vocals, recording
- Baptiste Vigier – rhythm guitar
- Valentin Hauser – bass, layout, photo
- Antoine Salin – drums
- Victor Guillet – keyboards, clean vocals

Additional musicians

- Eddie Czaicki – guest vocals on track 8
- Kévin Traoré – guest vocals on track 11
- Steve Garner – guest vocals on track 11

Additional personnel

- Charles J. Wall – production, mixing, mastering
- Betraying the Martyrs – production
