= Front Porch Step =

Music project by Jake McElfresh

- Also known as: Front Porch Step
- Born: Jake McElfresh; 1991 (age 34–35); Newark, Ohio, U.S.
- Genres: Acoustic rock, indie rock, emo revival
- Instrument: Acoustic guitar
- Years active: 2012–present
- Label: Pure Noise

Front Porch Step is the solo acoustic project of Jake McElfresh of Newark, Ohio.

== History ==
Front Porch Step began in 2012. In 2013, Front Porch Step signed to Pure Noise Records and released his debut album Aware. In 2013, he supported Never Shout Never on four of their tour dates. In the summer of 2014, Front Porch Step played on the Vans Warped Tour. In the fall of 2014, Front Porch Step played on the Pure Noise Records Tour with State Champs, Handguns, Forever Came Calling, Brigades and Heart to Heart. In February and March 2015, Front Porch Step planned to go on his first headlining tour, with support from Have Mercy, Alcoa, Hotel Books, and Head North. Due to sexual harassment allegations, McElfresh has suspended his tour until further notice. Front Porch Step was going to partake in the 2015 Vans Warped Tour, which is held annually throughout the summer, but was removed from the tour due to the allegations brought up against him.

On June 2, 2016, after a year long hiatus due to sexual harassment allegations, Mcelfresh returned with the release of a song called 'Help Me Hurt' to Spotify.

== Allegations of sexual misconduct ==
McElfresh has been accused by several young people of sexual harassment through mobile phones, including sending nude pictures of himself to underaged girls. This led to a petition demanding he be removed from the 2015 Warped Tour. His record label, Pure Noise Records, and Kevin Lyman, creator of the Warped Tour, announced they were aware of the allegations.

On January 4, 2015, McElfresh announced via his Facebook page that he had suspended all current tour dates, including Warped Tour, due to the allegations. On April 3, 2015, McElfresh issued a public statement via Facebook. In it, he explained that when growing up, he had self-esteem issues and "certainly was not a ladies man," and when he finally got his breakthrough with music, he was surprised at how much attention from female fans he received. He admitted that he had corresponded through text messages with women, some of whom were underaged, but claimed that the conversations were "not as one sided as they seem," pointing out that no charges had been brought against him. He also stated that even though some of the conversations were sexual in nature, "(he) only had conversations with willing participants". McElfresh then admitted that [he] "wondered if (he) wanted to be alive anymore" in the few months after the allegations were brought up, and took a break from social media after being dropped by his label and removed from all tours, considering it the "greatest thing (he) could have ever done". He also stated that he intends to return to music in the summer.

On July 1, 2015, McElfresh performed his first show since the allegations were brought, at the Acoustic Basement at the Nashville, Tennessee stop of Warped Tour. Warped Tour founder Kevin Lyman stated that he had spoken with McElfresh's personal counselor, who said that the performance would be a part of his therapy, he would not be paid for the show, and he would not appear at any other stops of the tour. Lyman stated that he allowed McElfresh to perform the show because he has not been charged with a misdemeanor, stating that "If he was a legitimate danger to anyone, he simply wouldn't be here." Many bands tweeted their opinions of the situation, practically all in distaste. McElfresh also dealt with a concertgoer in the crowd who publicly criticized him, saying "The difference between you and me is that I know who I am, and I am very proud of that. So you can go ahead, watch my set. Thank you very much. Thanks for the ticket money, dude."

The controversy was the subject of a song by Stray from the Path entitled "D.I.E.P.I.G.", which attacks musicians who use their fame to abuse young girls.

== Personal life ==
As of 2023, McElfresh is a born again Christian and announced he has a son with his wife Chanel.

== Discography ==
=== Studio albums ===
Year	Album	Chart positions
Year	Album	Top Heatseekers
2013	Aware: Released: November 12, 2013; Label: Pure Noise Records; Format: CD, LP, digital download	39
2017	I Never Loved Before I Found You.: Label: I Never Loved Before I Found You; Format: CD, LP, digital download, cassette	

=== EPs ===
Year	Album details
2014	Whole Again: Released: December 2, 2014; Label: Pure Noise Records; Format: CD, Vinyl, music download

=== Singles ===
Year	Album details
2017	Burned: Released: 2017; Label: I Never Loved Before I Found You; Format: CD, music download
2017	Stones: Released: 2017; Label: I Never Loved Before I Found You; Format: CD, music download
2020	You Look Nothing Like My Dreams: Released: 2020; Label: You Look Nothing Like My Dreams; Format: CD, music download
