= Betraying the Martyrs =

French metalcore band

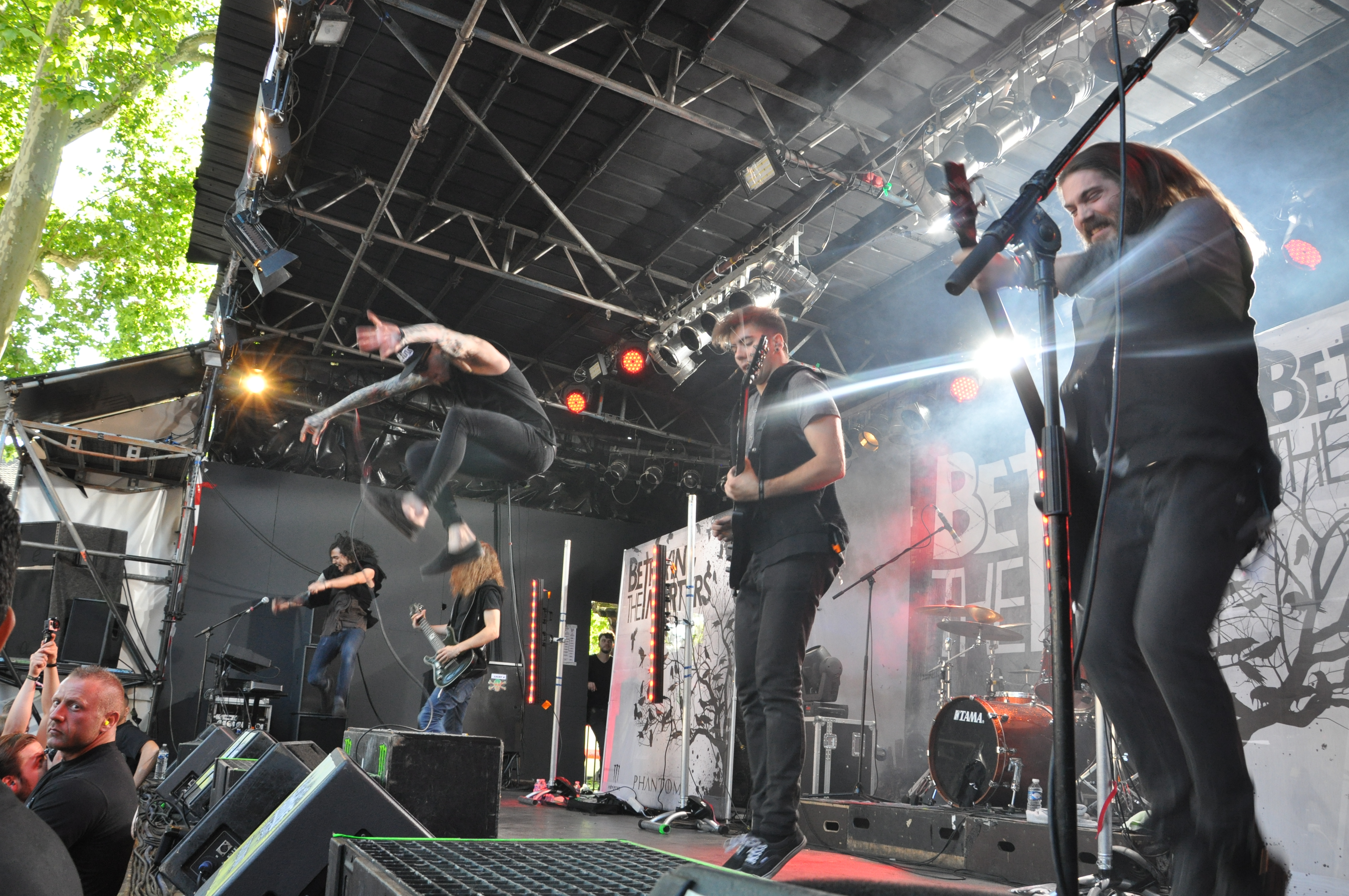
- Betraying the Martyrs at Summerblast Festival 2014

Background information
- Origin: Paris, France
- Genres: Metalcore; deathcore; symphonic metal
- Years active: 2008–2023
- Labels: Out of Line; Sumerian; Listenable
- Past members: Fabien Clévy; Eddie Czaicki; Antoine Salin; Lucas D'Angelo; Mark Mironov; Aaron Matts; Baptiste Vigier; Valentin Hauser; Victor Guillet; Boris le Gal; Steeves Hostin; Rui Martins
- Website: betrayingthemartyrs.com

Betraying the Martyrs were a French metalcore band formed in Paris in 2008. The band's final lineup consisted of vocalist Rui Martins, guitarists Steeves Hostin and Baptiste Vigier, bassist Valentin Hauser, drummer Boris le Gal, and keyboardist Victor Guillet. At the time of their breakup in 2023, they were signed to Out of Line Music. Through their previous label, Sumerian Records, Betraying the Martyrs released four studio albums: Breathe in Life (2011), Phantom (2014), The Resilient (2017), and Rapture (2019). They also released two EPs: The Hurt the Divine the Light (2009) and Silver Lining (2022).

== History ==
Betraying the Martyrs were founded in 2008. Before joining the band, Czaicki played in the French metalcore outfit, Darkness Dynamite. Guillet (born 1990) was the lead vocalist and keyboardist in the post-hardcore band, The Beverly Secret. Vigier and d'Angelo were in the metalcore band, Black Curtains. On 18 November 2009, Betraying the Martyrs released their debut EP The Hurt the Divine the Light, a self-produced recording funded entirely by the band and mixed by Stephane Buriez. The EP sold more than 2,000 copies in France alone. Their first European tour, "The Survivors Tour" (2010), involved the band playing in support of Whitechapel, Dark Funeral, Darkness Dynamite, A Skylit Drive, Adept, Despised Icon, Dance Gavin Dance, While She Sleeps and Shadows Chasing Ghosts. The band met current vocalist, British native Aaron Matts (born 1990), during that tour, as he replaced Czaicki shortly thereafter. Czaicki opted to leave the band to pursue an art career.

In 2011, the band started working on their first album and quickly signed deals with Sumerian Records, for North America, and Listenable Records for the rest of the world. On 23 September 2011, their debut studio album, Breathe in Life, was released globally. The album was produced in the band's studio and mixed by Charles J Wall at Sonic Assault Studios and the cover art was created by Hauser, the band's bass player. The album works with the central themes of life, faith and interpersonal relationships.

Between April and May 2011, the group completed a second European tour, the "Breathe in Life Tour", for the promotion of their debut album. The tour included performances in Germany, Russia, Ukraine, Poland, the Czech Republic, Switzerland, Austria, Luxembourg, Belgium, France, the Netherlands and the United Kingdom. Support on the "Breathe in Life Tour" was provided by Russian deathcore band, My Autumn, and Despite My Deepest Fear. Later that year, during the northern fall, the band toured the United States with Born of Osiris, Veil of Maya, Carnifex and Structures. Breathe In Life was warmly received by reviewers throughout Europe and notable received higher acclaim when compared to other groups in their genre.

Guitarist Magazine named the album as one of the Top 5 Albums of 2011 (second behind Megadeth), and the Best Newcomer of the Year in the Hard Metal category. Gibson named them in the Ten Metal Bands to check out in mid-2012, along with bands like Asking Alexandria and Five Finger Death Punch. In May 2012, Salin quit the band and was replaced by Russian drummer Mark Mironov from Russian deathcore band My Autumn.

On 28 May 2014, the band released "Where the World Ends". On 17 June 2014, the band released "Jigsaw". On 14 July 2014, the band released a cover version of "Let It Go" (taken from Frozen). Also on 15 July they released their second studio album, Phantom.

The release of the video brought attention to the fact that Mark Mironov, BTM's drummer since 2012, sadly had been replaced. Welcoming Boris Le Gal to take his place, the band released the following statement on their official website: "As some of you may have noticed, our adored drummer and friend Mark Mironov is no longer a present part of the BTM line-up; this comes as a result of on-going VISA issues with Mark being a citizen of Russia. The increased difficulties became a heavy weight on the band, both in terms of consistency, and financially too."

After touring and promoting "The Great Disillusion", the band released a second single on 13 November, "Won't Back Down", with lyrics taking a stance against the rise of terrorist attacks in France and around the world: "One year after the terrible Paris attacks, let us remember who we are, and what we stand for, lest we forget." A third single was released on 30 November, "Lost for Words", featuring a symphonic background and a more prominent clean refrain from Victor Guillet. The Resilient was released on 27 January 2017.

In September, Sumerian Records released the band's cover of the Avenged Sevenfold song "Bat Country" from Metal Hammer magazine's tribute album Hail to the Kings – A Tribute to Avenged Sevenfold from earlier that year. Later that month, the band announced that lead guitarist Lucas D'Angelo was leaving the band citing musical differences and an increased interest in the production side of music. In the same statement the band announced that their new guitarist would be Stevees Hostin and that he had performed in their Avenged Sevenfold cover. The band returned to the studio to begin work on their next album.

On 2 April 2021, Matts announced that he left Betraying the Martyrs, launching his new band at the same time, ten56. In an interview with Wall of Sound, Matts explained his departure was because "I've been wanting to sing about gross shit and just go all out crazy on it for so long. But obviously, I can't just come to the band and change the whole formula." On 14 October 2021, Betraying the Martyrs introduced their new singer Rui Martins on the release of their new single and its music video, "Black Hole". The band also announced the signing with German label Out of Line Music. In May 2022, the band announced their new EP, Silver Lining, would be released on 24 June.

On 4 October 2023, the band announced they had disbanded due to the "world's economical situation" and "rising cost of touring". They released two final singles, "Irae" and "The Veil", with a music video made for both tracks.

== Touring ==
Betraying the Martyrs toured Europe in early 2012 on the "Bonecrusher Tour", with Carnifex, Within the Ruins, Molotov Solution and Beneath the Massacre. As of April 2012, the band are touring the US, on the "Sumerianos Tour", alongside Upon a Burning Body and I, the Breather, in addition to numerous other support acts. The band then followed a European tour, supporting Veil of Maya on the "European Eclipse 2012" tour, alongside Vildhjarta, Structures and Volumes. For the remainder of 2012, the band has been included on the line-up for "The All Stars Tour 2012" (northern summer) alongside Suicide Silence, Unearth, Attila and Winds of Plague; and on the Mayhem Festival tour of 2012 with Slipknot, Slayer, Anthrax and many others. They also performed as an opening act at the "Hellfest 2012" tour. They also replaced Winds Of Plague at the Graspop Metal Meeting 2012 Tour.

Betraying the Martyrs completed touring with Asking Alexandria, While She Sleeps and Motionless in White, Chelsea Grin, Attila, and Within the Ruins. They returned to the studio to record their follow-up album.

During summer 2013, Betraying the Martyrs toured many festivals in Europe. They played during the Greenfield Festival in Switzerland alongside bands such as Rammstein, Queens of the Stone Age, The Prodigy and Parkway Drive. They also performed at the Ghosfest with The Devil Wears Prada, Chelsea Grin and Veil of Maya. Betraying the Martyrs participated on the Never Say Die! Tour with Emmure, Carnifex, I Killed the Prom Queen, Hundredth, Northlane and Hand of Mercy. In November 2013, they made an eastern and Scandinavian headline tour.

Lamb of God's Chris Adler is their international manager.

== Musical style and influences ==
Betraying the Martyrs are overall recognized as a metalcore band. The group traditionally has been labeled as a deathcore group (which is a hybrid of the genres metalcore and death metal) due to their heavy death metal-influenced riffs on some of the earlier material. AllMusic said the band is known to "temper the punishing brutality of deathcore with melodic flourishes pulled from symphonic and progressive metal, giving it a theatricality that feels distinctly European." The band stated that they have lot of influences, but the most notable ones include bands like Born of Osiris, Gojira, Veil of Maya; Meshuggah, Suicide Silence, Dimmu Borgir, Emperor and Cannibal Corpse.

== Band members ==
Final lineup

- Baptiste Vigier – rhythm guitar (2008–2023)
- Valentin Hauser – bass (2008–2023)
- Victor Guillet – keyboards, clean vocals (2008–2023)
- Boris le Gal – drums (2016–2023; touring 2013–2016)
- Steeves Hostin – lead guitar (2018–2023)
- Rui Martins – lead vocals (2021–2023)

Former

- Fabien Clévy – lead guitar (2008–2010)
- Eddie Czaicki – lead vocals (2008–2010)
- Antoine Salin – drums (2008–2012)
- Mark Mironov – drums (2012–2016)
- Lucas D'Angelo – lead guitar, backing vocals (2010–2018)
- Aaron Matts – lead vocals (2010–2021)

Touring

- Christophe De Oliveira – bass (2011)
- Brendan Perrot – bass (2012)
- Sydney Taieb – drums (2012)
- Junior Rodriguez – drums (2013)
- Nicolas Bastos – drums (2013)

Timeline

== Discography ==
Studio albums

- Breathe in Life (Sumerian/Listenable, 2011)
- Phantom (Sumerian, 2014)
- The Resilient (Sumerian, 2017)
- Rapture (Sumerian, 2019)

EPs

- The Hurt the Divine the Light (Self-released, 2009)
- Silver Lining (Out of Line, 2022)

Singles

- "Survivor" (Destiny's Child cover; Self-released, 2010)
- "Man Made Disaster" (Sumerian/Listenable, 2011)
- "Tapestry of Me" (Sumerian/Listenable, 2011)
- "The Great Disillusion" (Sumerian/Listenable, 2016)
- "Bat Country" (Avenged Sevenfold cover; Sumerian, 2018)
- "Black Hole" (Out of Line, 2021)
- "Irae" / "The Veil" (Out of Line, 2023)

== Music videos ==
| Title | Year | Director | Album |
|---|---|---|---|
| "Tapestry of Me" | 2011 | Gas Carpenter | Breathe in Life |
| "Man Made Disaster" | 2011 | Thomas Welsh | Breathe in Life |
| "Let It Go" | 2014 | Nicolas Delestrade | Phantom |
| "The Great Disillusion" | 2016 | Igor Omodei | The Resilient |
| "Lost for Words" | 2016 | Igor Omodei | The Resilient |
| "The Resilient" | 2017 | Igor Omodei | The Resilient |
| "Eternal Machine" | 2019 | Igor Omodei | Rapture |
| "Parasite" | 2019 | Igor Omodei | Rapture |
| "Monster" | 2020 | VHS | Rapture |
| "Black Hole" | 2021 | Pavel Trebukhin | Silver Lining |
| "Swan Song" | 2022 | Brice Hincker and Amélie Diane | Silver Lining |
| "Irae" / "The Veil" | 2023 | Pavel Trebukhin | Godspeed |
