= Stray from the Path =

American hardcore band

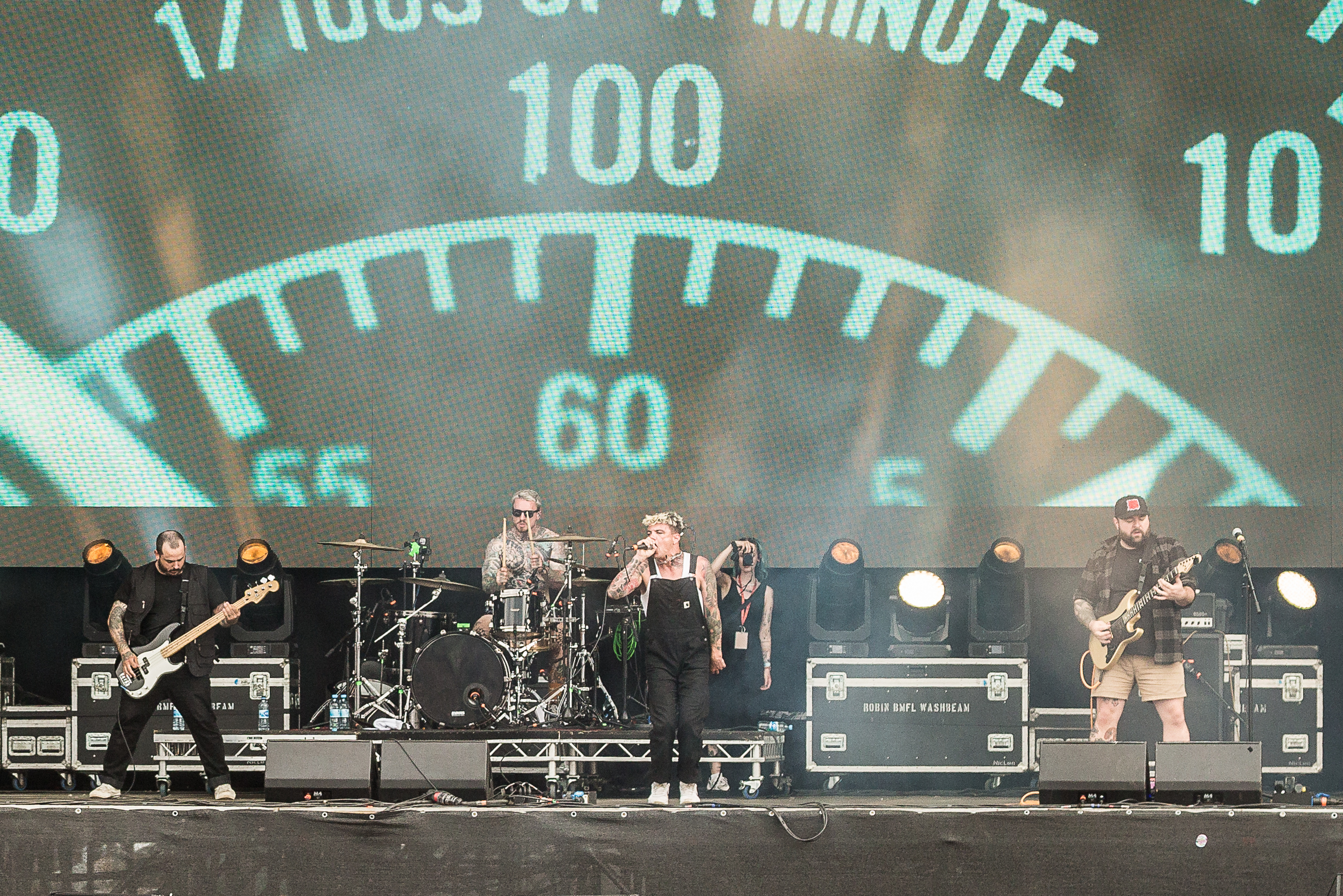
- Stray from the Path performing at With Full Force 2023

Background information
- Origin: Long Island, New York, U.S.
- Genres: Hardcore punk; rap metal; nu metal; metalcore
- Years active: 2001–2025
- Labels: Pride; Five Point; Sumerian; UNFD; SharpTone
- Members: Thomas Williams; Andrew Dijorio; Anthony Altamura; Craig Reynolds
- Past members: Ed Edge; Frank Correira; John Kane; Justin Manas; Ryan Thompson; Dan Bourke

Stray from the Path was an American hardcore punk band formed in 2001 on Long Island, New York. They have released eleven full-length albums. Their first three records were independently released – People Over Profit in 2002, Audio Prozac in 2003, and Our Oceania in 2004. Stray From The Path then signed with Sumerian Records and released six records with them; Villains in 2008, Make Your Own History in 2009, Rising Sun in 2011, Anonymous in 2013, Subliminal Criminals in 2015, and Only Death Is Real in 2017. In 2019, they signed to UNFD and released Internal Atomics, followed by Euthanasia in 2022, and Clockworked in 2025 via SharpTone Records.

On May 30, 2025, the band surprise-released their eleventh and final album Clockworked as well as announcing they will break up at the end of 2025 after fulfilling their tour commitments.

== History ==
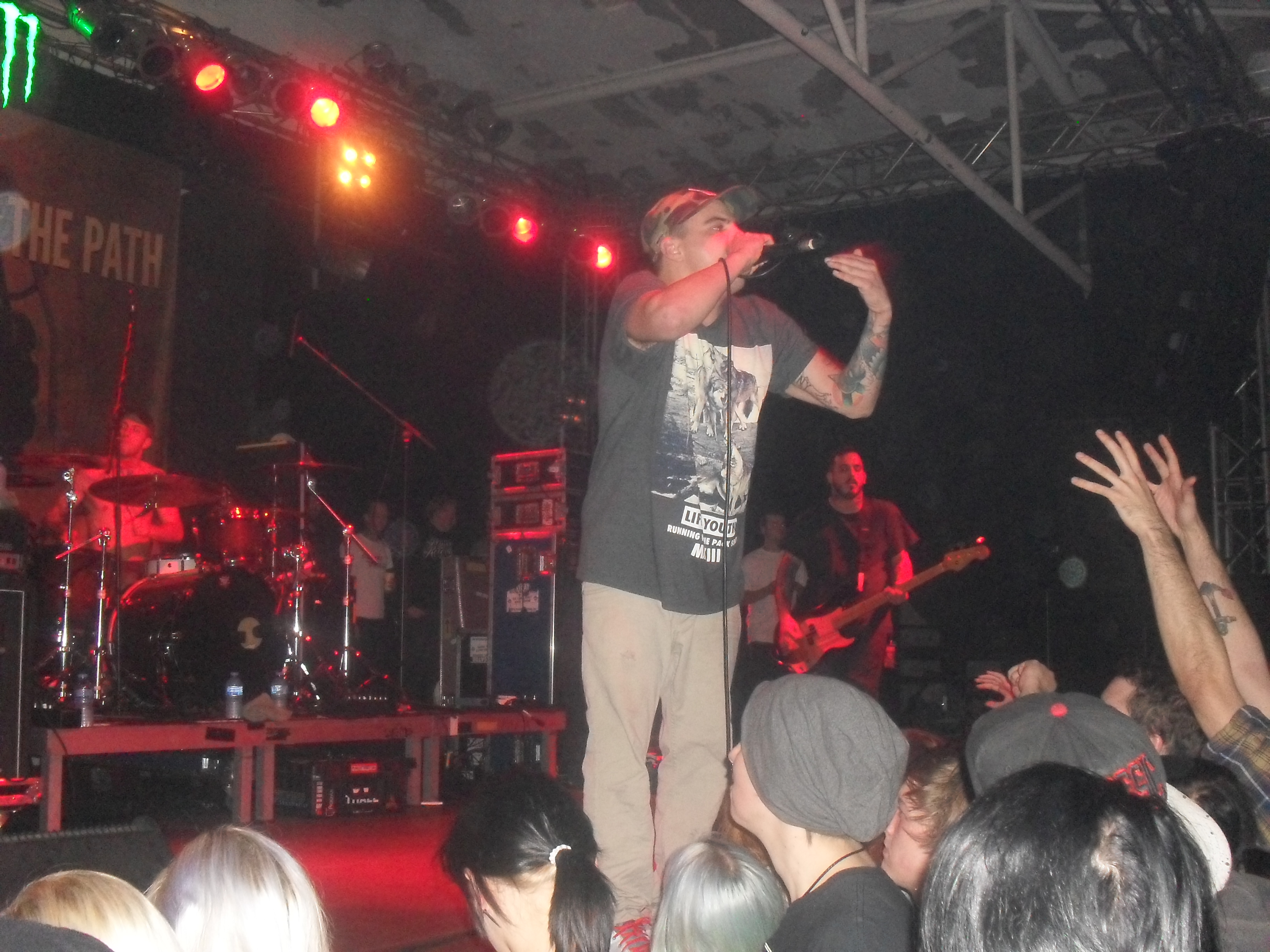
Stray From the Path performing live in 2013

The band was formed on Long Island, New York, in 2001. Its original members were Thomas Williams, John Kane, Justin Manas, Ed Edge and Frank Correira. In October 2003, they went into the studio with Joe Cincotta and Terrance Hobbs of Suffocation to record their debut full length, Audio Prozac. In July 2005, after playing extensively over the following eight months to support their record, they released Our Oceania on August 2, 2005. In November 2005 original singer Ed Edge left the band and was replaced by Andrew Dijorio (Drew York). After touring the country DIY, SFTP entered God City Studios and recorded Villains with Converge Guitarist, Kurt Ballou. Upon completion of the record, the songs spread to California, which led to a contract with Sumerian Records. After being recorded independently at God City, Villains was properly released on May 13, 2008. After touring North America, the band saw some lineup changes. Ryan Thompson replaced Frank Correira on bass guitar, Justin Manas moved from drums to guitar replacing John Kane, and drummer Dan Bourke, formerly of This Is Hell, took over the role on drums. SFTP entered the studio with producer Misha Mansoor and recorded 2009's Make Your Own History. After touring North America, and Europe vigorously, the band hit Machine Shop Recordings with producer Will Putney to record their latest record Rising Sun. This record featured guest appearances by Andrew Neufeld of Comeback Kid, Cory Brandan Putman of Norma Jean and Jonathan Vigil of The Ghost Inside. In 2012 they released a download only single "Landmines". They later released Anonymous in September 2013 which featured Jesse Barnett from Stick to Your Guns and Jason Butler from Letlive.

In 2015 they released Subliminal Criminals, continuing the rapcore sound of their previous effort while delving into more social and political themes (including "D.I.E.P.I.G", which specifically reference child abuse allegations towards Front Porch Step and Lostprophets frontman Ian Watkins). This was to be the final album with Dan Bourke on drums, as he would leave the group in 2016 to be replaced by former Brutality Will Prevail and Dead Swans drummer Craig Reynolds. On the day of the 2016 United States presidential election, they released a single entitled "The House Always Wins". On July 12, 2017, they announced details of their new album Only Death Is Real along with single "Goodnight Alt-Right", which attracted criticism from right wing groups upon release due to its lyrics.

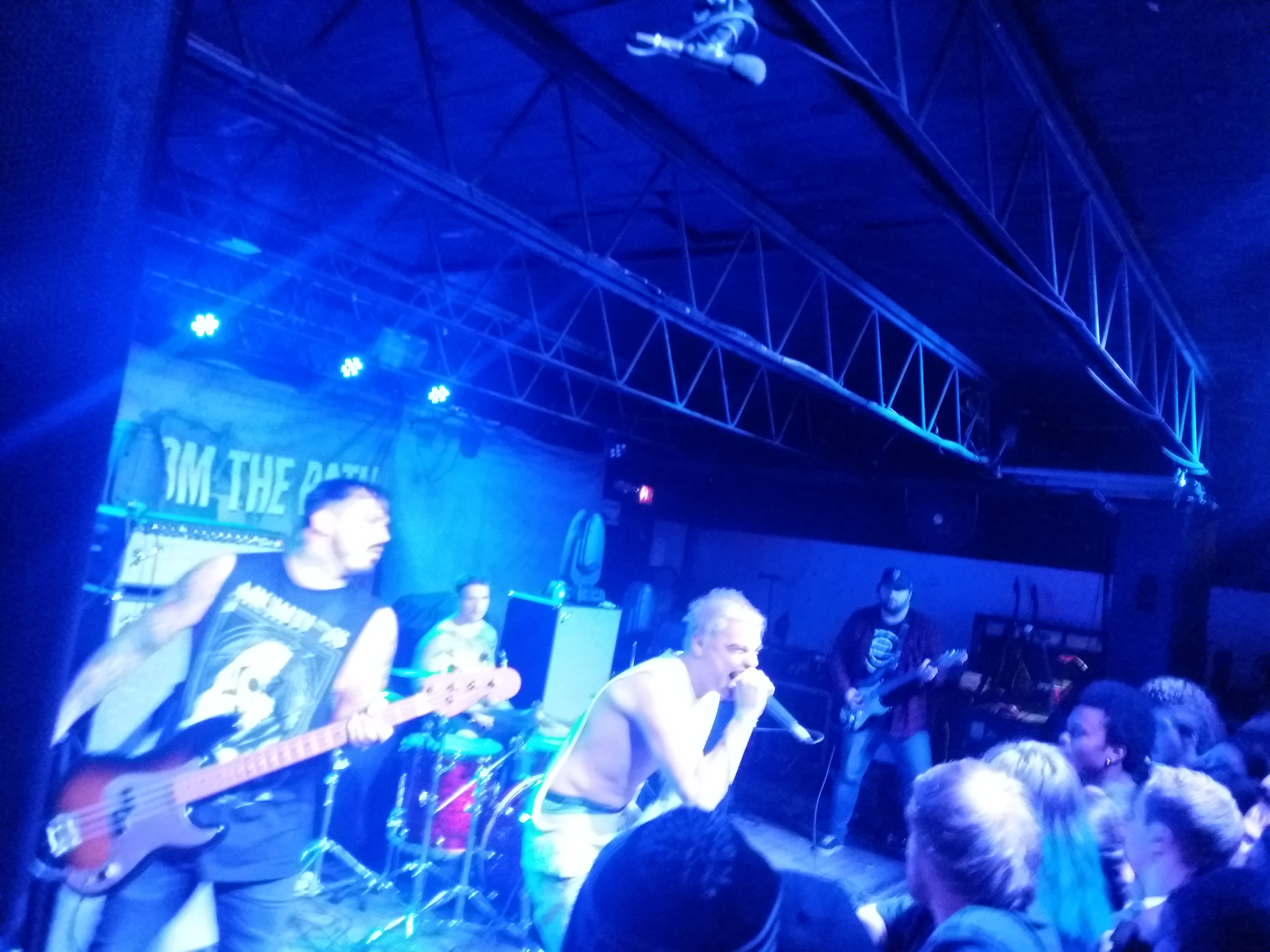
Stray from the Path in 2017

In 2018, the ensemble toured with Anti-Flag, the White Noise and Sharptooth.

In September of 2022, SFTP released their album Euthanasia. The making of the album was fraught with strife due to the COVID-19 pandemic. The band would send each other ideas but would find that they would go long periods of time without playing their instruments. Craig would drum on Twitch during this time and was later joined by Tom Williams on guitar. This avenue helped re-fire their passion for performance. Nick Ruskell writes: "From empty tank to firing on all cylinders, it's been a journey of reconnection [sic] to make Euthanasia. But, having done so with such impressive force, it's put Stray From The Path firmly back on track."

In Feb. 2025, they released their first new music since their album Euthanasia, as part of a signing announcement announcing that they aligned with Sharptone.

On May 30, 2025, the band announced that they would break up at the end of the year following their touring commitments and final festival appearances. On the same day, they also surprise-released their eleventh and final album, Clockworked.

On November 28, 2025, Stray from the Path played their final show at Crane in Bristol, with support from Alpha Wolf, Graphic Nature, and Calva Louise.

== Musical style and influences ==
Their music has been categorized as metalcore, hardcore punk, rap metal and nu metal. Their earliest material was metalcore containing elements of math rock, however over the years have developed a larger emphasis on groove and technicality. Metal Sucks attributed this development as being due to the band's growing influence from Rage Against the Machine. In an article for Exclaim!, writer Joe Smith-Engelhardt described the band's style as a "Rage Against the Machine-worshipping take on hardcore".

They have cited influences including Meshuggah, Gojira, Refused, Anti Flag, Rage Against the Machine, Converge, Glassjaw and Deftones.

== Political views ==
The band's members view their status as giving them a platform to express their views, with their music including references to their opposition to capitalism, economic materialism, police brutality, racial injustice, pedophilia and far-right political ideologies like fascism and the alt-right. In an article for Loudwire, writer Taylor Markarian stated that "As their band name suggests, Stray have never been shy about their opinions on social and political issues and deviating from mainstream thought. They have always been blunt and unapologetic about identifying and criticizing hypocrisy, corruption, racism, sexism and other social justice issues". In a 2017 article for Metal Hammer, Williams stated:

If you're lucky enough to get a crowd and a stage like we do, to put that to waste is kind of a shame. We have to use what we're so fortunate to get, and use it for good. Whether you agree or disagree, we're writing music that makes you feel something, and to me that's a victory in itself.

Publications have generally described their ideology as being left-wing, however the members prefer not to subscribe to a particular side of the political spectrum, with Williams stating that "If Donald Trump was to say something that I liked – which may only be when hell freezes over – then I'll like it. I'm never going to not like something that someone says because of whatever label they're under. I've gone on record saying this, but Hillary Clinton was scarier to me than Trump. Cause that guy will say shit to your face whereas as Hillary will shake your hand, smile, and then kill you in your sleep".

During the 2016 United States presidential election, the band were vocal in their opposition to both main party candidates, with Williams in particular showing support for Bernie Sanders. In a 2017 article for KillYourStereo.com, Williams stated that "When people ask me about voting, I say that I don't vote and I never will vote. Because when you vote you send a message that it's okay for this system to continue". The band publicly held similar opinions ahead of the 2020 presidential election, tweeting on April 8, 2020, "Biden and Trump. Who’s your leader? Trick question, none of the above."

== Band members ==
Stray from the Path live at With Full Force 2023

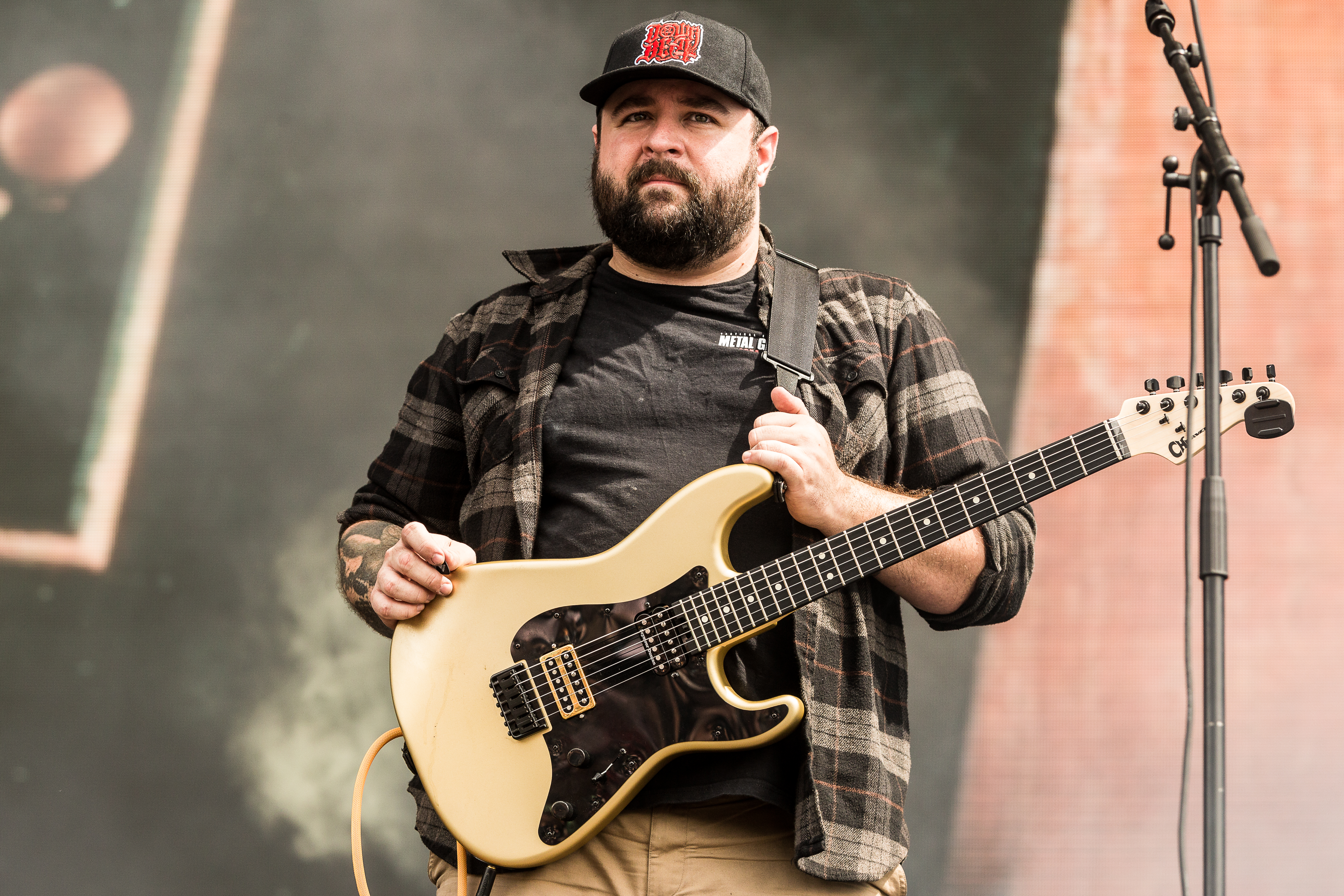
Thomas Williams

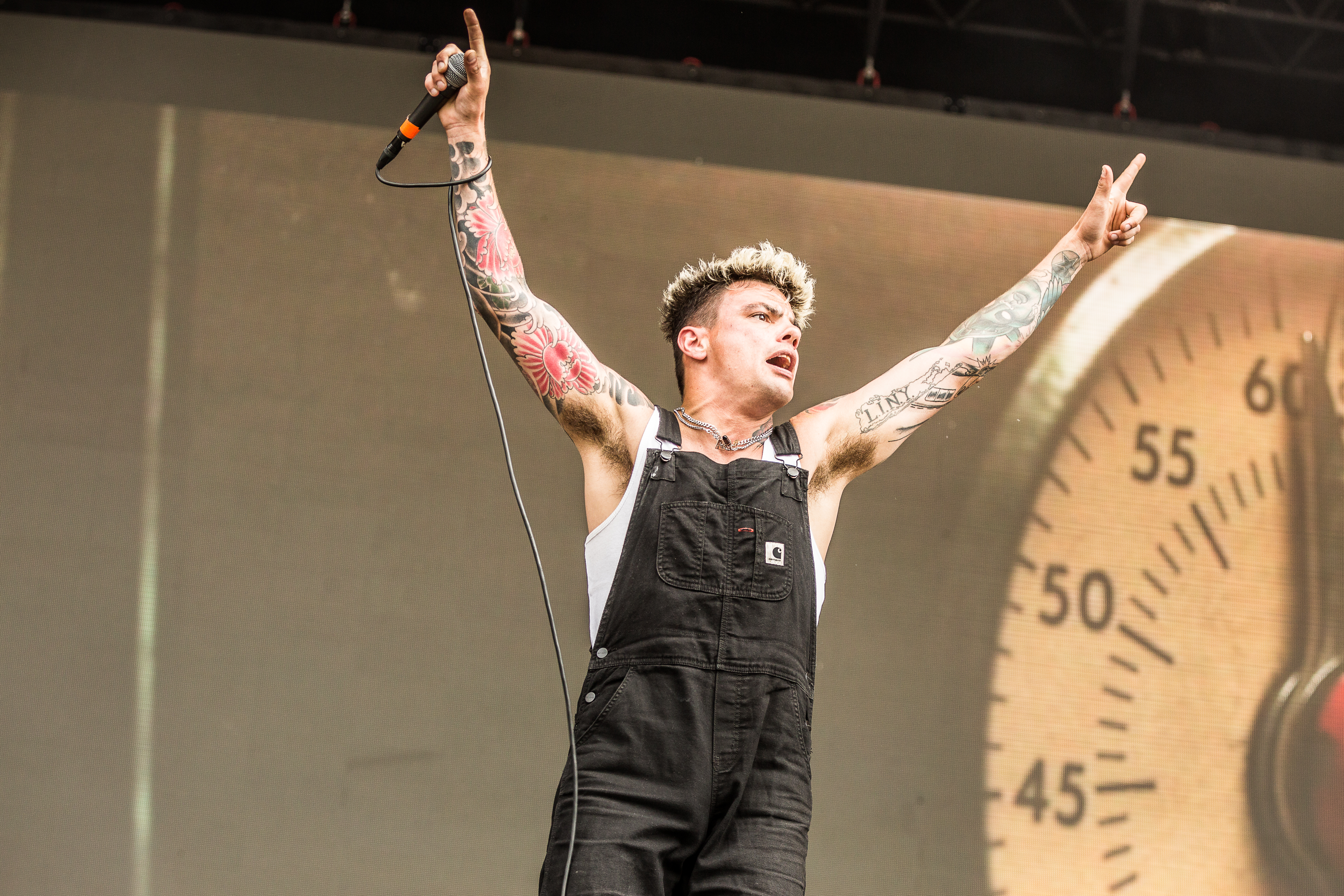
Andrew Dijorio

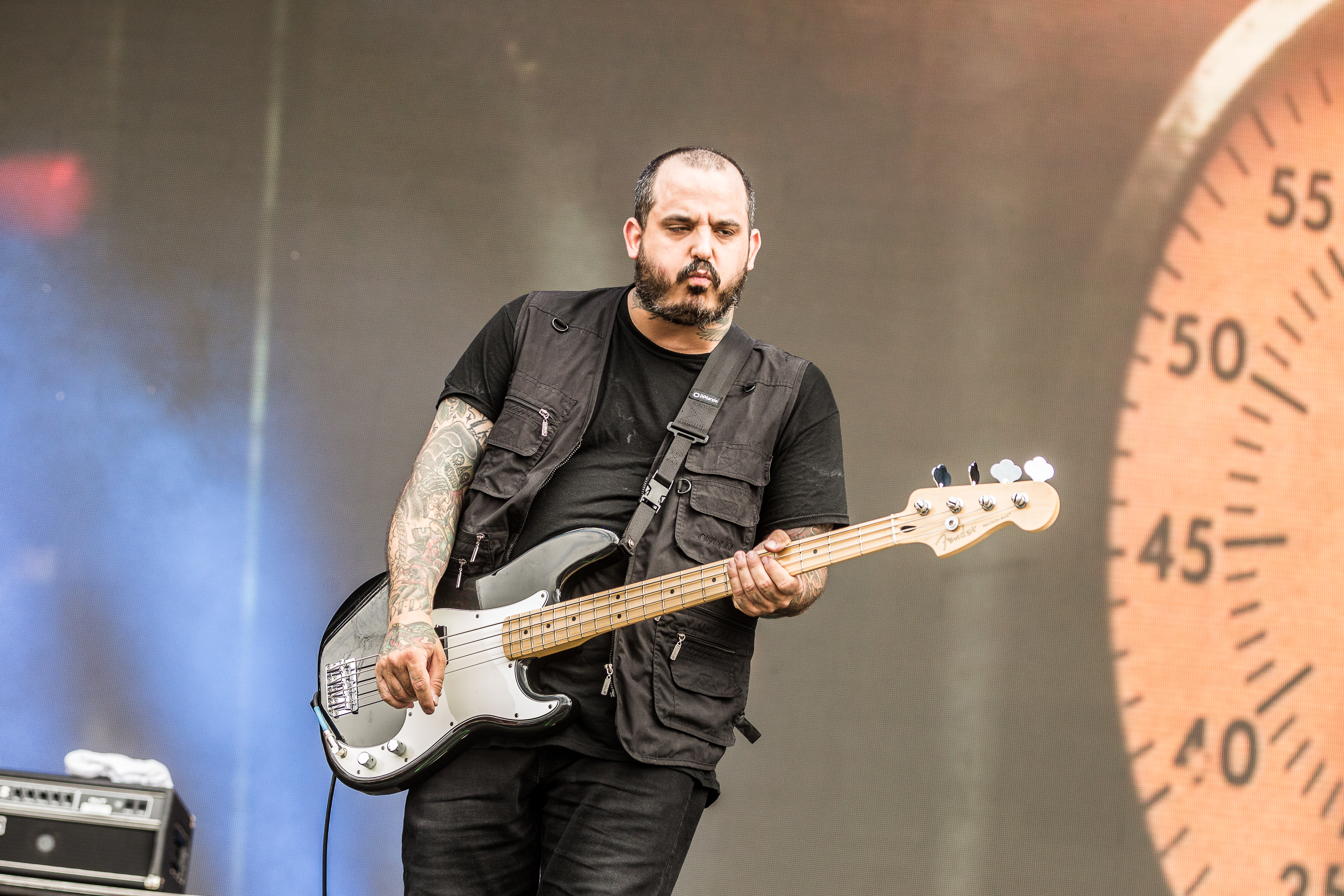
Anthony Altamura

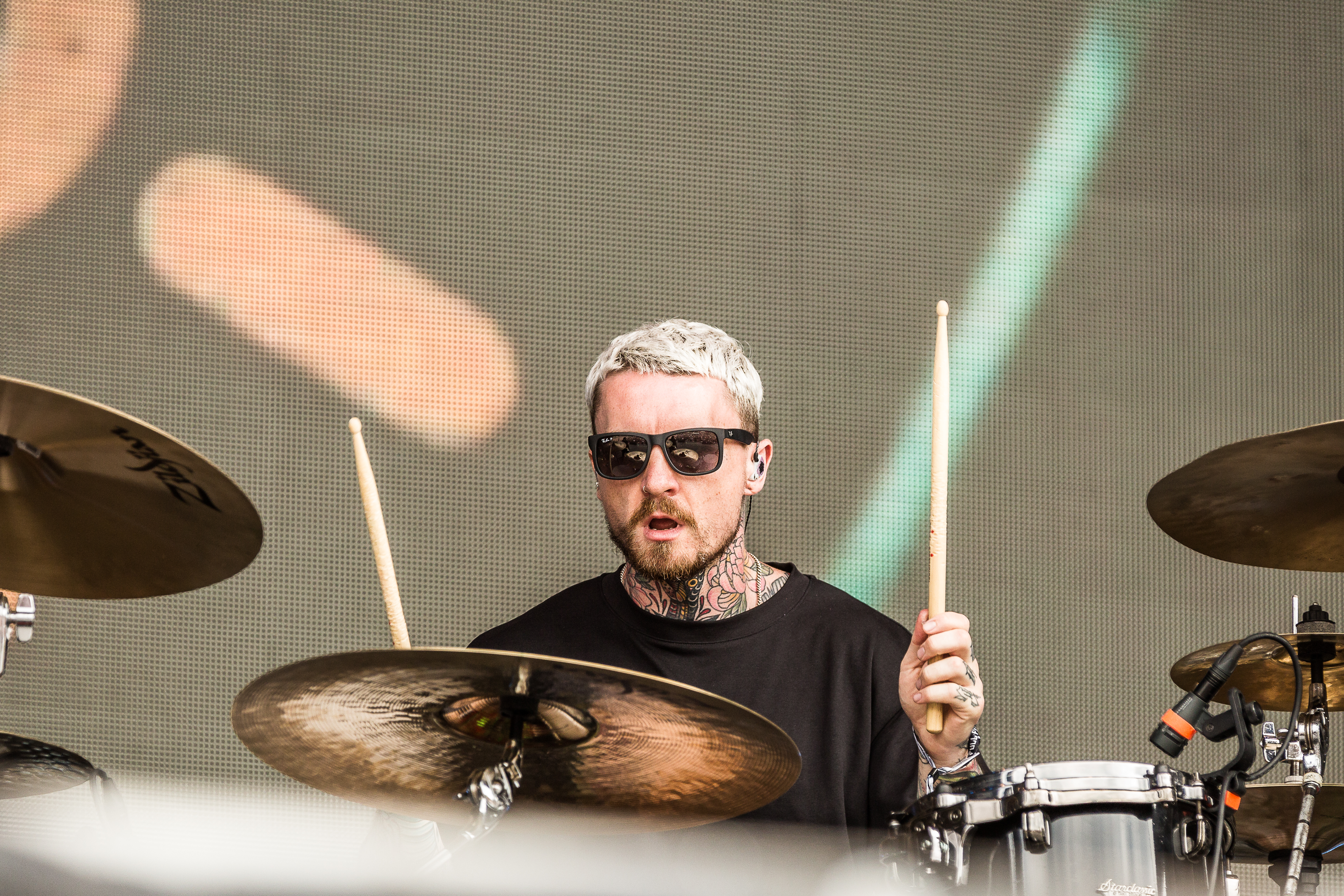
Craig Reynolds

Final lineup

- Thomas Williams – guitar, backing vocals (2001–2025)
- Andrew "Drew York" Dijorio – lead vocals (2005–2025)
- Anthony "Dragon Neck" Altamura – bass, backing vocals (2010–2025)
- Craig "Cowboy Crag" Reynolds – drums (2016–2025)

Former members

- Ed Edge – lead vocals (2001–2005)
- Frank Correira – bass (2001–2008)
- John Kane – guitar (2001–2008)
- Justin Manas – drums (2001–2008), guitar (2008–2009)
- Ryan Thompson – bass (2008–2010)
- Dan Bourke – drums (2008–2016)

Timeline

== Discography ==
=== Studio albums ===
List of studio albums, with selected chart positions
Title	Album details	Peak chart positions					
Title	Album details	US	US Heat.	US Indie	US Alt.	US Rock	US Hard Rock
Audio Prozac	Released: October 11, 2003; Label: Pride Recordz; Formats: CD; Track listing: 1. Every Time I Fall Asleep You Video Tape Me; 2. How Bout Them Yankees; 3. I Saw The Creed Guy Eating Pigeons Last Night In Central Park; 4. That Whole Thing About Helen Keller Was Horseshit; 5. Eat A Dwarf; 6. No One Cares, Bears Bears; 7. Formaldehyde Kiss; 8. Avon Addict; 9. Captain Granville Vs. Sally Ruth The Battle Of The Mimi; 10. Godsend Of The Insomniac; 11. Christopher Reeves Just Rolled In From Montana And Boy Is His Battery Tired	—	—	—	—	—	—
Our Oceania	Released: August 2, 2005; Label: Five Point Records; Formats: CD; Track listing: 1. The Life You Live; 2. Casual Conversations; 3. Solace; 4. Appendix I: If There Is Hope; 5. Thick And Thin; 6. A Not So Modern Parasite; 7. Appendix II: ...It Lay In The Proles; 8. The Great Exodus; 9. Formaldehyde Kiss; 10. A Tri-Colored Goldmine; 11. CODA: The Nightbirds	—	—	—	—	—	—
Villains	Released: May 13, 2008; Label: Sumerian, Victory; Formats: CD, digital download	—	—	—	—	—	—
Make Your Own History	Released: October 26, 2009; Label: Sumerian; Formats: CD, digital download	—	—	—	—	—	—
Rising Sun	Released: August 30, 2011; Label: Sumerian; Formats: CD, digital download	—	19	—	—	—	—
Anonymous	Released: September 17, 2013; Label: Sumerian; Formats: Vinyl, CD, digital download	40	—	3	12	15	3
Subliminal Criminals	Released: August 14, 2015; Label: Sumerian, UNFD; Formats: Vinyl, CD, digital download	—	—	13	18	24	6
Only Death Is Real	Released: September 8, 2017; Label: Sumerian, UNFD; Formats: Vinyl, CD, digital download	—	—	23	—	—	—
Internal Atomics	Released: November 1, 2019; Label: UNFD; Formats: Vinyl, CD, digital download, streaming	—	—	31	—	—	—
Euthanasia	Released: September 9, 2022; Label: UNFD; Formats: Vinyl, CD, digital download, streaming	—	—	—	—	—	—
Clockworked	Released: May 30, 2025; Label: SharpTone; Formats: Vinyl, CD, digital download	—	—	—	—	—	—
"—" denotes a recording that did not chart or was not released in that territory.

=== Demos ===
- People Over Profit (2002, Independent)
Tracklisting

1. I Made A Hoobastank In My Pants
2. Expected Favors, Unspoken Apologies
3. Needles
4. Why Cars Don't Start In Horror Movies
5. Flirt
6. Survey Says
7. Where Words Fail Emotions
8. Picture Perfect
9. Amnesia Hero

=== Split albums ===
- How to Make a Ucalegon (with Lilu Dallas, 2007, Five Point Records)
Tracklisting

1. Stray From The Path - "To Vanish"
2. Lilu Dallas - "Betsy, Logan, And A Guy From One Of Those 'Caught Cheating' Springer Episodes"
3. Stray From The Path - "The Villain"
4. Lilu Dallas - "I Used To Be That Guy With The Beard (You Know, The One From 'The Notebook')"

=== Stand-Alone Singles ===
- Back To School (Mini Maget) (2015) [Deftones Cover for Rock Sound's Worship & Tributes album]
- Talking Tragedy (2016) [In beneficial support to The Ghost Inside's near-fatal bus accident]
- The House Always Wins [Single Version] (2016)
