= Nightmare on Providence Street =

Studio album by Blind Witness
- Released: March 9, 2010
- Studio: Undercity Recordings, Los Angeles, California, US
- Genre: Deathcore, metalcore, melodic death metal
- Length: 39:30
- Label: Mediaskare
- Producer: Michael Rashmawi

Blind Witness chronology
Silences Are Words (2008)	Nightmare on Providence Street (2010)	I Am Hell (2015)

Nightmare on Providence Street is the second and last studio album of the Canadian deathcore band Blind Witness. Produced by Michael Rashmawi and released on March 9, 2010 through Mediaskare Records, it was well received by critics.

== Reception ==
In 2020, critic Dave Griffiths wrote about Nightmare on Providence Street: "Filled with infuriated lyrics, punchy down picked guitar riffs and insanely fast drumming, this sophomore effort pleased both critics and fans of the genre alike and is still creating ripples 10 years after its release."

== Track list ==
All lyrics are written by Jonathan Cabana except where noted.

No.	Title	Lyrics	Length
1.	"Prologue"		0:22
2.	"All Alone"		3:31
3.	"Nightmare on Providence Street"	Cabana, Maggie Cabana	3:36
4.	"Since the Beginning"	Cabana, Desroches, Lacroix	3:37
5.	"These Countless Sleepless Nights"	Cabana, Lepage	4:38
6.	"10 Minutes of Clinical Death"		3:30
7.	"Baby One More Notch"	Jayp Tees, Zac	3:55
8.	"Have You Ever Been Lucky?"		4:19
9.	"Lovely Flesh" (in the album liner notes listed as "Last Call")		3:57
10.	"For Life" (in the album liner notes listed as "Something for Life")		2:05
11.	"The New Year"		6:03
Total length:			39:30

== Credits ==
Production and performance credits are adapted from the album liner notes.

Blind Witness

- Jonathan Cabana – vocals
- Maxime Lacroix – guitars
- Jon Campbell – guitars
- Miguel Lepage – bass
- Eric Morotti – drums

Guest musicians

- Chris Blair (ex-As Blood Runs Black) – vocals on "All Alone"
- Ricky Hoover (ex-Suffokate, Ov Sulfur) – vocals on "Nightmare on Providence Street"
- Jon Vigil (The Ghost Inside) – vocals on "Baby One More Notch"
- Jonny Santos (Spineshank, Silent Civilian) – vocals on "For Life"

Additional

- Michael Rashmawi – production, engineering
- Zack Ohren – mixing, mastering

Artwork

- Sean Widup (Widup Art) – Artwork
