= Legion (band) =

American deathcore band

- Origin: Columbus, Ohio United States
- Genre: Deathcore
- Years active: 2009–present
- Label: eOne Music Good Fight
- Members: Michael Guilford; Chris Dragics; Alex Heiberger; Mason Prince; Kevin Rutherford
- Website: Legion on Facebook

Legion is an American deathcore band from Columbus, Ohio currently signed to Good Fight Entertainment and eOne Music. Their debut album, Woke was released on July 30, 2013. The band has been said to use elements of heavy hardcore, beatdown, and metallic hardcore in their music with an emphasis of slowed-down riffs and guttural vocals similar to The Acacia Strain and Whitechapel.

== History ==
The band formed together in 2009 playing shows in their hometown and writing for their first set of songs an EP titled This Is The End. After a year or so of playing these songs and developing a local fan base the band decided to release some new music. They would go on to release their new EP titled Bottom Feeder on September 29, 2010. The release of the EP was received well and was featured on a number of underground metal blogs that praised the young deathcore act on a stellar debut. With the new EP under their belts the band began to hit the road and played outside of Ohio for the first time playing shows with Like Moths To Flames, My Ticket Home, and For The Fallen Dreams.

In 2011 the band played a number of festivals such as New England Hardcore and Metal Fest, The JAMboree and Bled Fest. Tours began piling up as well now that the band had two EPs to play from as well as new material. They toured with bands like The Crimson Armada, Dr. Acula, In Dying Arms, Belie My Burial and Demolisher. Prior to their spring tour the band announced their drummer Kevin Rutherford would be leaving the band to play for fellow Ohio band Like Moths To Flames. The band was on tour for most of the summer and continued writing for their full length. In December 2012, the band announced via their official Facebook page that they have signed to Good Fight and eOne Music and that they would be releasing their debut full length in the summer of 2013.

The band toured after being picked up by eOne and began touring with other metal bands such as Job For A Cowboy, Beneath the Massacre and Fit For An Autopsy. The new album would be titled Woke and was released on July 30, 2013 featuring a video for the lead single "And Then, The Devil Said".

== Tours ==
2011

- Spring Tour with Demolisher from March 12 to April 2.
- The Shore Tour with The Crimson Armada and Legacy from April 10 to 23.
- Summer tour with In Dying Arms and In Alcatraz 1962 from August 24 to September 4.
- The Summer Swag Tour with Belie My Burial from June 1 to June 13.
- Headlining Product of Hate Tour from December 10 to 22.

2012

- Deal With Hell Canadian Tour with Dr. Acula and In Alcatraz 1962 from January 21 to 29.
- Ripping Through The East Tour with Delusions from February 17 to March 4.
- Shook Clothing Tour with Substructure and With Life In Mind from June 20 to 25.
- The Damned Bloods Canadian Tour with King Conquer, Aegaeon, Last Ten Seconds of Life from November 2 to 9.
- Headlining tour with Adaliah and Belie My Burial from August 2 to 8.
- The End Of The World North American Tour with Job For A Cowboy, Cephalic Carnage, I Declare War and Allegaeon from December 6 to 18.

2013

- Spring Tour with This or the Apocalypse, Your Memorial and ERRA from March 18 to 28.
- Shook West Coast Tour with No Bragging Rights, Being as an Ocean and Verah Falls from May 11 to 23.
- The Lone Wolf Tour with Bermuda, Seeker, Sessions from June 8 to 18.
- Summer Tour with Fit For An Autopsy and Beyond the Shore from July 25 to August 12.
- Headlining tour with Those Who Fear from September 26 to October 3.
- East Coast Tour with Beneath the Massacre, Rings of Saturn and Rivers of Nihil from October 4 to 13.
- Winter tour with Within the Ruins, Sworn In and Reflections from November 29 to December 7.

2014

- Winter Tour with Kublai Khan from January 16 to February 1.
- Thick as Blood farewell tour with Face All Fears and Leaders from March 15 to April 17.
- Break Your Face Tour with The Last Ten Seconds of Life, Demolisher and Death of an Era from May 9 to 25.

== Members ==
Current

- Alex "Psychopath" Heiberger – guitars/vocals (2009–present)
- Chris Dragics – guitars/vocals (2009–present)
- Michael Guilford – vocals (2009–present)
- Mason Prince– bass guitar (2009–present)
- Kevin Rutherford – drums (2009–2012)( 2015–present)

Former

- Jake Rodriguez – drums (2012–2013)
- Cameron Campbell – drums (2013–2015)

== Discography ==
EPs

- This Is The End (self-released, 2009)
- Bottom Feeder (self-released, 2010)

Studio Albums

- Woke (eOne Music, 2013)
