= Endwell (band) =

American melodic hardcore band

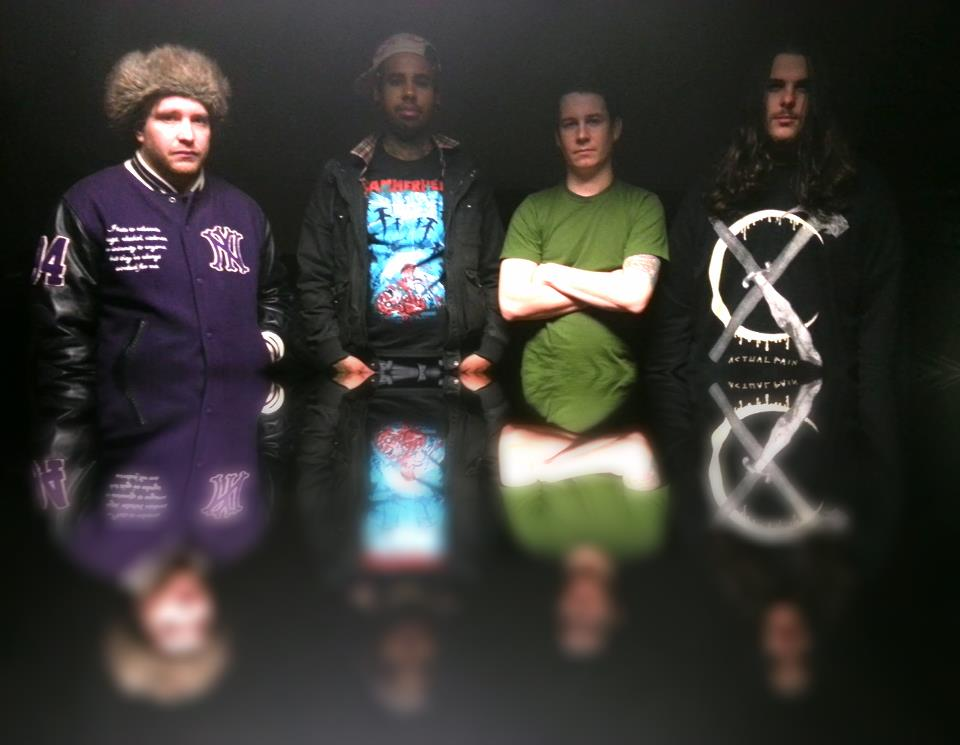
- Endwell in 2013

Background information
- Origin: New York City, U.S.
- Genres: Hardcore punk, melodic hardcore, metalcore, post-hardcore (early)
- Years active: 2003–present
- Labels: Century Media Records; Mediaskare Records; Victory Records (Former)
- Members: Sean Murphy; Danny Pupplo; Gregg Gallo; Dustin Newcombe; Tom Bissonette

Endwell is an American hardcore punk band from Queens, New York City, formed in 2003. They have released one independent EP, one album on Victory Records; and one EP and two albums via Mediaskare Records.

== History ==
=== Formation to Homeland Insecurity (2003–2007) ===
Endwell formed in Queens in 2003 and started gaining popularity and experience through local shows. The band independently recorded and released their first EP titled The Missing Pieces in 2005 and began touring the country. In June 2004, they entered Excess dB Entertainment's Hellfest Battle of the Bands contest, hiding their New York-based location because the entry was limited to New Jersey bands. Nevertheless, Endwell was one of nine bands that won the contest and were given a playing slot on one of Hellfest 2004's smaller stage. At Hellfest 2004, the band was noticed by Bayside's Anthony Raneri. Bayside was signed to Victory Records and suggested to Endwell that they should attempt to get signed to the label. Members of Endwell grew up listening to various Victory bands including Earth Crisis and Hatebreed.

Victory Records owner Tony Brummel agreed to let Endwell display their talent on stage in order to decide if the band was a good fit for the label. The show was to be played in Chicago, so Endwell had to drive there with all their gear from New York. On the way to the show, their van got hit while driving by a truck causing the van to flip several times and ejecting their lead singer, who spent a few weeks in the hospital. The rest of the band was only hospitalized for a few days with minor injuries. Endwell recovered a few months later and played the show for Victory Records, signing with the label shortly after.

Endwell began to write and record songs for their debut album, Homeland Insecurity, in California with Jay Baumgardner (Papa Roach, Evanescence, New Found Glory). Lead guitarist Dan Puglisi discussed the production of the new album:

"The album is all over the board. We came up with songs that sound like nothing we've ever done before, including some fast, energetic stuff really that makes you want to take a breather between songs. All of the songs were written to be played live. There are no filler or album-only tracks here. If we couldn't pull them off live, it didn't make the album."

The album was released in October 2006, and the band toured heavily in support of it. Although they did not headline, they opened for acts such as Comeback Kid, It Dies Today, and As Blood Runs Black.

=== New lineup and Revenge is a Healthy Motive (2008) ===
After almost two years of touring, Endwell hoped to start working on their follow-up to Homeland Insecurity but ran into several speed bumps. The first issue was an inconsistent lineup. Several members left, and replacements would only stay with the band for a few shows and nothing seemed permanent. The second issue being that Victory Records decided to drop Endwell's contract with the label leaving the band without a way to release their music. Details about the new EP Revenge is a Healthy Motive were given out as early as January 2008, and news about working on a follow-up album to Homeland Insecurity was released even earlier. The band posted several demo tracks on their MySpace page and several live recordings of new material on YouTube, but progress was slow with new members coming and going. In early May 2008, Endwell announced they had signed to Mediaskare Records/Century Media Records and set May 27, 2008, as the release date for their EP.

Revenge is a Healthy Motive departed from the band's original pop punk/hardcore punk mix, and focused more on hardcore. The band also changed their lyrical style, in reaction to the current state of the band. The new direction of the album was said to be "hard emotionally and musically," and that while working on the album, the band felt "like [they] did when [they] started playing hardcore when [they] were little kids." Shortly after their previous album was released, Endwell "[was] sick of it, and nobody wanted to play the songs [from Homeland Insecurity]."

Endwell was preparing to tour in support of their new EP alongside Emmure and On Broken Wings on a string of shows dubbed the "Mosh Lives Tour," however, Endwell was kicked off of the tour before it started due to a T-shirt depicting a severed bulldog head on the back. The bulldog was intended to be a comical reference to the logo of their former label that they were kicked out of, Victory Records, not cruelty against animals.

=== Consequences (2009) ===
Endwell released their second studio album Consequences in April 2009 through Mediaskare Records.

=== Punishment (2011–present) ===
On April 26, 2011, Endwell released their second album on Mediaskare records titled Punishment. They claimed to have taken a black metal influence and mixed it in with their already hardcore sound. Produced by band members Danny Pupplo & Sean Murphy, the record was tracked at Undercity Recording in North Hollywood, California between July 28 and August 26. It was mixed by Steve Evetts (Hatebreed, Every Time I Die, The Dillinger Escape Plan, Poison the Well) and mastered by Alan Douches.

After their last European tour, Matt Rogers left Endwell and joined Deez Nuts, whereas members Mike Sciulara and Pieter VanDenBerg departed and became permanent members of This Is Hell, leaving the band with the two core members, vocalist Sean Murphy and guitarist Danny Pupplo.

== Members ==
=== Current ===
- Danny Pupplo – guitar (2003–present)
- Sean Murphy – vocals (2006–present)
- Dustin Newcombe – guitar (2008–2010, 2011 tour, 2012–present)
- Gregg Gallo – drums
- Thomas Bissonette – bass, vocals (2012–present)

=== Former ===
- Chris Formosa – vocals (2003–2005)
- Steven Dicasa – bass/vocals (2003–2005)
- Alex Sieligowski – drums (2003–2005)
- Dan Puglisi – guitar (2003–2007)
- Bobby Holohan – drums (2005–2006) (Formerly of Skycamefalling)
- Steve Muskopf – bass (2005–2007)
- Andy Zambito – drums (2007–2008)
- Fotch Jornet- guitar (2007–2008) (Knuckle Up!, Stifling Neglect)
- Mike Sciulara – drums (2008–2011) (First Blood, This Is Hell, Extinction AD, Vanna (tour fill in))
- Pieter VanDenBerg – bass (2009–2011) (This Is Hell, Extinction AD)
- Matt Rogers – guitar (2010–2011), bass (2007–2010) (Deez Nuts)
- Mike Kaabe – drums, vocals (2006–2007, 2008 tour, 2012–present)

== Discography ==
Studio albums

- Homeland Insecurity (2006)
- Consequences (2009)
- Punishment (2011)

EPs

- The Missing Pieces (2005)
- Revenge is a Healthy Motive (2008)

== Videography ==
- "Single and Loving It" (2006)
- "Avoidant (Ghost Will Haunt)" (2009)
