= Obey the Brave =

Canadian hardcore punk band

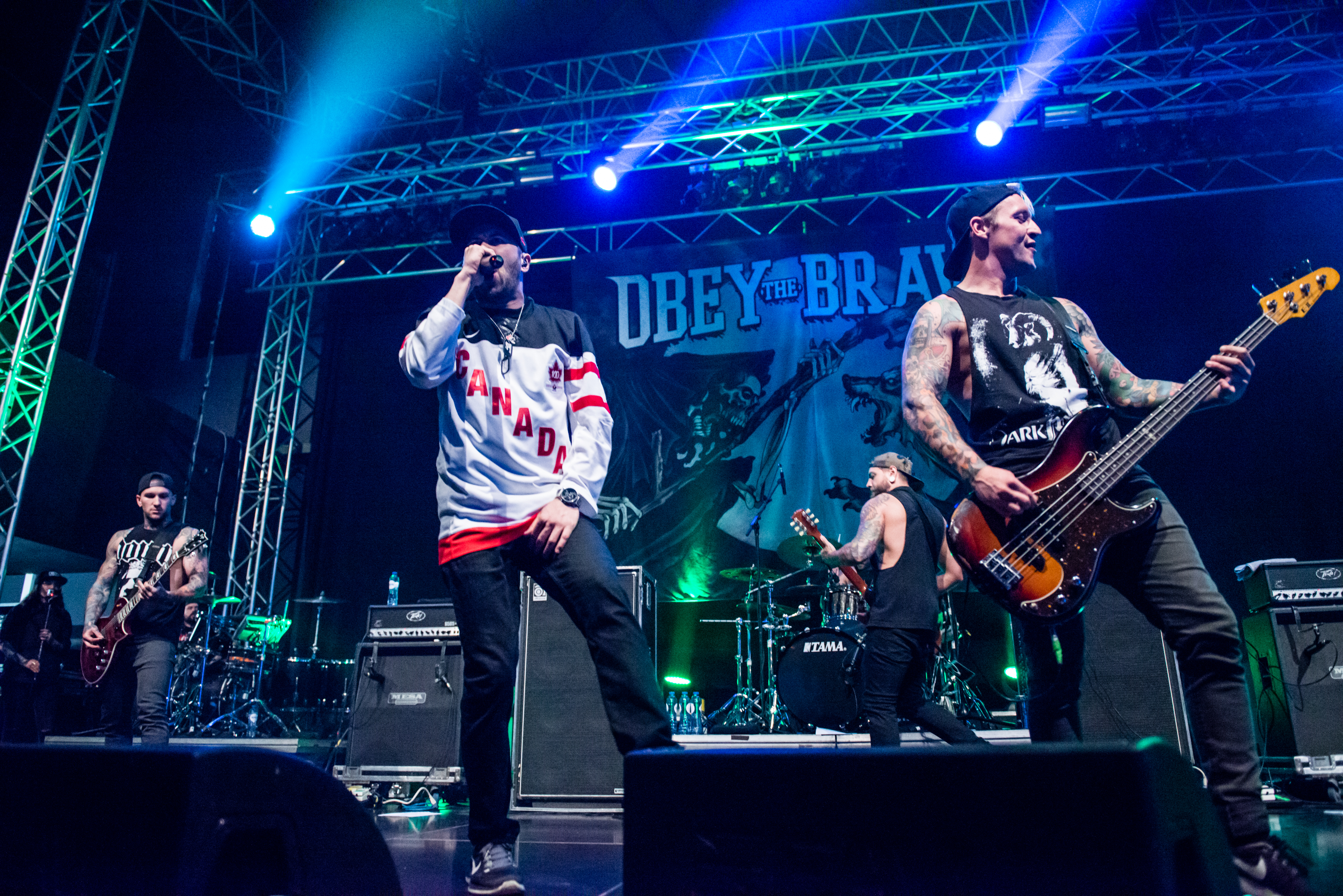
- Obey the Brave performing live at Impericon Festival 2015

Background information
- Origin: Montreal, Quebec / Ottawa, Ontario, Canada
- Genres: Hardcore punk, metalcore, melodic hardcore
- Years active: 2012–2020
- Labels: Epitaph, Impericon, Hell for Breakfast, Distort, Good Fight
- Spinoff of: Despised Icon, Blind Witness
- Past members: Alex Erian; Terrence McAuley; Stevie Morotti; Ben Landreville; Greg Wood; Miguel Lepage; John Campbell; Cory Wilson
- Website: www.obeythebrave.com

Obey the Brave was a Canadian hardcore punk band From Montreal, Quebec and Ottawa, Ontario. Formed in 2012, the band features Despised Icon singer Alex Erian on vocals as well as Blind Witness bassist Miguel Lepage, guitarists John Campbell and Greg Wood, and drummer Stevie Morotti. By the middle of 2012, just over half a year after becoming a band, the metalcore act found itself signed to iconic label Good Fight, with the EP, Ups And Downs, released in 2012. They signed to the label Epitaph, with the band's debut studio album, Young Blood, released in August of that same year. A sophomore album, Salvation, followed in 2014. The third album Mad Season was followed up in 2017. The fourth album Balance was followed up in 2019.

== History ==
Obey the Brave was founded in 2012, featuring vocalist Alex Erian, bassist Miguel Lepage, guitarists John Campbell and Greg Wood, and drummer Stevie Morotti. They released their debut EP, Ups And Downs on May 22, 2012 through Good Fight. Their debut studio album, Youngblood was released on August 24, 2012 via Epitaph. The first single, "Get Real", was released on May 1. Terror vocalist, Scott Vogel is featured in the music video with the band. The band embarked on a vigorous touring schedule that saw the group stay on the road throughout most of 2012 including the 2012 portion of the All-Stars tour, opening on the European Never Say Die! Tour and a U.S. tour. In early 2013, they opened on the "Brothers of Brutality" tour with Whitechapel and Emmure. Then, the band returned to Europe.

Their second album, Salvation, came out on September 12, 2014. The first single, "Raise Your Voice", was released on August 12. Tours included several in the U.S., one in Russia, a headlining tour in Europe and then Japan.

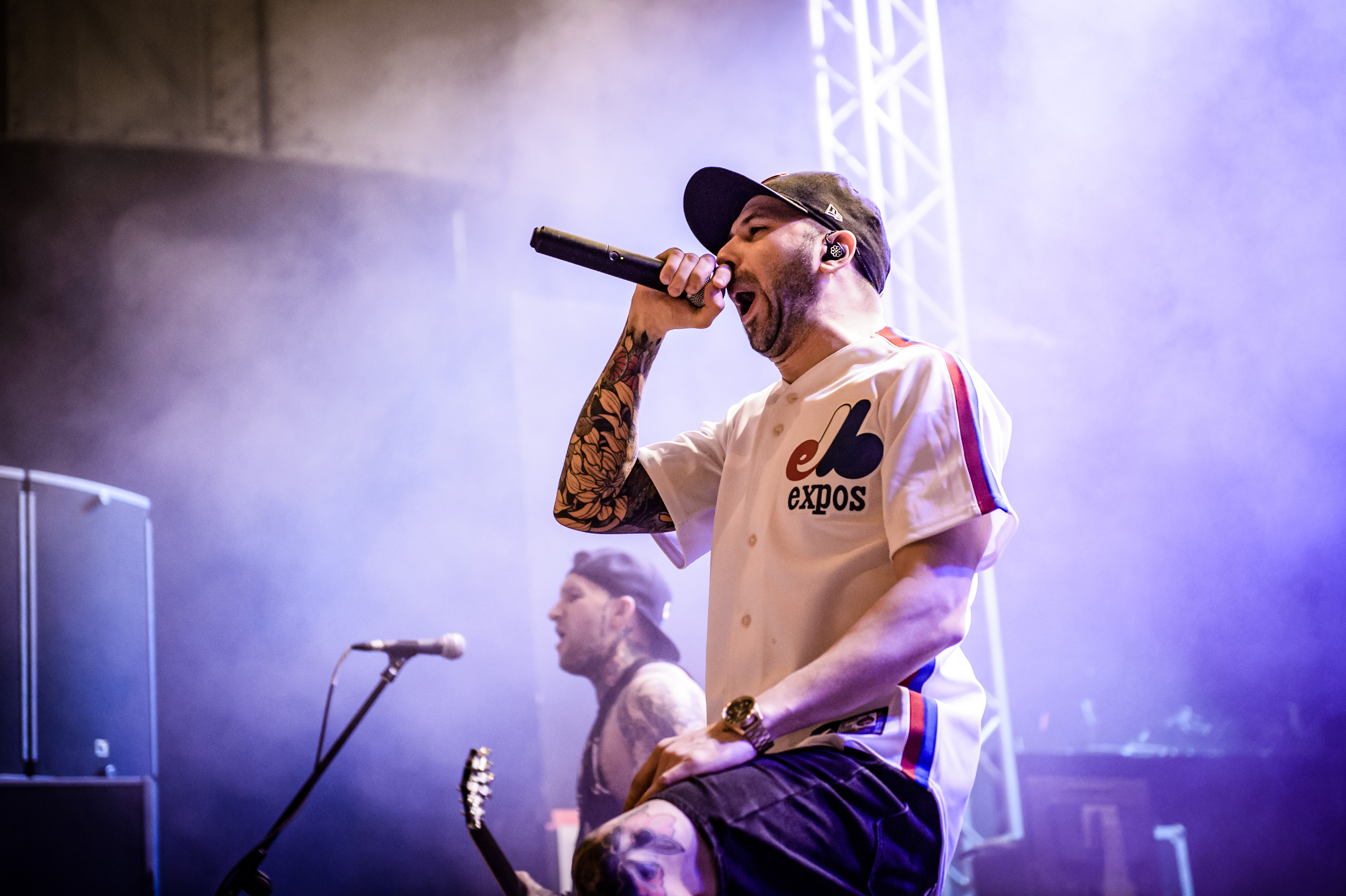
Obey the Brave, live at Impericon.

Mad Season was released on June 2, 2017. The first single, "Drama", premiered on May 9. Steve Marois from Despised Icon is featured in the music video with the band. They performed the "Shadows Inside" tour of Canada in May 2017, returned to Europe in mid-2017. They returned to Europe again early 2018, and returned to the U.S. for the first time in four years in mid-2018, and were headliners in November 2018.

Two singles "No Apologies" and "Balance", were respectively released on April 5 and May 24 in advance of their fourth album, Balance, which was released on July 19, 2019. In early 2019, they were an opening act again in Europe, and then four concerts in Canada in May 2019. They co-headlined a tour in the U.S. with Sharptooth in July, returning to Europe in November to support Lionheart.

On July 23, 2020, it was announced that the band had split.

The band can be heard in an episode of The Terminal List: Dark Wolf Season 1 Episode 4 in the scene in the car. The song "Lifestyle" is playing on the radio.

== Members ==
Final line-up

- Alex Erian – lead vocals (2012–2020)
- Stevie Morotti – drums, backing vocals (2012–2020)
- Terrence McAuley – guitar, backing vocals (2015–2020)
- Ben Landreville – bass, backing vocals (2019–2020)

Former members

- Miguel Lepage – bass, backing vocals (2012–2015)
- Greg Wood – guitar (2012–2015)
- John Campbell – guitar, backing vocals (2012–2019)
- Cory Wilson – bass, backing vocals (2015–2019)

Touring members

- Steve Creaturo – bass, backing vocals (2018)

== Discography ==
Studio albums

- Young Blood (Epitaph Records, 2012)
- Salvation (Epitaph Records, EU:2013 US:2014)
- Mad Season (Epitaph Records, 2017)
- Balance (Impericon, 2019)

EPs

- Ups and Downs (Good Fight, 2012)

Music videos

- Live and Learn (2012)
- Get Real (2012) (Featuring Scott Vogel from Terror)
- It Starts Today (2012)
- Lifestyle (2013)
- Garde La Tête Froide (2013)
- Full Circle (2013)
- Raise Your Voice (2014)
- Short Fuse (2014)
- Up In Smoke (2015)
- On Our Own (2017)
- Drama (2017) (Featuring Steve Marois from Despised Icon)
- Mad Season (2017)
- No Apologies (2019)
- Balance (2019)
- Cold Summer (2019)
- Seeing Red (2019)
- Calme Le Jeu (2019)
