= Consequences (Endwell album) =

Studio album by Endwell
- Released: April 21, 2009
- Genre: Hardcore punk; metalcore; melodic hardcore
- Length: 41:05
- Label: Mediaskare

Endwell chronology
Revenge Is a Healthy Motive (2008)	Consequences (2009)	Punishment (2011)

Professional ratings
Review scores
Source	Rating
DecoyMusic.com	4/5 stars

Consequences is the second studio album released by American hardcore band Endwell. It will be the band's first studio album release after departing from Victory Records two years earlier. Consequences was released on April 21, 2009 through Mediaskare Records. This album features three tracks that were previously released on Endwell's Revenge is a Healthy Motive EP in 2008.

== Track listing ==
1. "Consequences"
2. "Weed Out the Weak"
3. "Such Great Depths" (Feat. Carl Schwartz of First Blood)
4. "Promises Wept"
5. "Mike Tyson"
6. "The Bridge (Blues Man's Cross Roads)"
7. "Avoidant (Ghost Will Haunt)"
8. "John Doe"
9. "Whatever Distance (Fear Prudence)"
10. "Welcome Inferno (Wrathful and Sullen)"
11. "Glaciers (10/21/03)"
12. "Rise and Fail (The Lesser Key of Solomon)"
13. "Living Through Losses (2/30/01)"
14. "As Low as a Life Can Get (Jumping the Shark)"
15. "Encounters at the End of the World (Stars)" (Feat. Jonathan Vigil of The Ghost Inside)

Track 14 opens with a line spoken by character Michael Scott (as portrayed by Steve Carell) from The Office, to his HR representative in the episode, "Casino Night".

== Personnel ==
- Sean Murphy – vocals
- Danny Pupplo – guitar
- Matt Rogers – bass
- Dustin Newcombe – guitar
- Andy Zambito (credited as Lemonhead Zambito) – drums
