= Instinct (As Blood Runs Black album) =

Studio album by As Blood Runs Black
- Released: March 15, 2011
- Studio: Undercity Recordings, North Hollywood, California
- Genre: Deathcore; melodic death metal
- Length: 33:19
- Label: Mediaskare
- Producer: As Blood Runs Black, Baron Bodnar

As Blood Runs Black chronology
Allegiance (2006)	Instinct (2011)	Ground Zero (2014)

Professional ratings
Review scores
Source	Rating
AllMusic	3/5 stars
MetalSucks	2.5/5 stars
Thrash Magazine	4.5/5 stars
Under the Gun Review	9.5/10

Instinct is the second studio album by American deathcore band As Blood Runs Black. It is the band's first album to feature guitarists Dan Sugarman and Greg Kirkpatrick, and the only album to feature vocalist Sonik Garcia.

== Track listing ==
No.	Title	Length
1.	"Triumph" (Instrumental)	0:40
2.	"Legacy"	3:34
3.	"Resist"	3:00
4.	"Angel City Gamble"	3:36
5.	"Reborn"	3:11
6.	"Tribulations" (Instrumental)	1:47
7.	"Divided"	3:02
8.	"King of Thieves"	3:34
9.	"In Honor"	3:05
10.	"Echoes of an Era"	4:02
11.	"Instinct"	3:48
Total length:		33:19

== Credits ==
As Blood Runs Black

- Sonik Garcia – vocals
- Ernie Flores – rhythm guitar
- Dan Sugarman – lead guitar
- Nick Stewart – bass
- Hector "Leche" De Santiago – drums

Production

- Produced by As Blood Runs Black
- Engineered, Mixed, Mastered & drum engineering by Zack Ohren @ Undercity Recordings, North Hollywood, CA
- Vocal engineering by Taylor Voeltz
- Additional composer: Ernie Flores
- Executive Producer & A&R – Baron Bodnar

Artwork

- Artwork by Gary Tonge
- Layout by Daniel McBride
- Photo by Luis Lopez Descartes

== Chart performance ==
Chart (2011)	Peak position
US Billboard 200	111
US Hard Rock Albums	6
