= Tree of Tongues =

Tree of Tongues may mean:

- A diagram of language evolution of that name, in J.R.R. Tolkien's 1937 document, the Lhammas
- An album of that name, produced by the Exotic Animal Petting Zoo
