= Homeland Insecurity =

Homeland Insecurity may refer to:

- Homeland Insecurity (American Dad!), an episode of American Dad!
- Homeland Insecurity (Endwell album), a 2006 album by Endwell
- Homeland Insecurity (Flatland Cavalry album), a 2019 album by Flatland Cavalry
