= Allegiance (As Blood Runs Black album) =

Studio album by As Blood Runs Black
- Released: June 6, 2006
- Studio: Castle Ultimate Studios, Oakland, California
- Genre: Deathcore; melodic metalcore; melodic death metal
- Length: 37:04
- Label: Mediaskare
- Producer: As Blood Runs Black, Baron Bodnar

As Blood Runs Black chronology
Allegiance (2006)	Instinct (2011)

Allegiance is the debut studio album by American deathcore band As Blood Runs Black. This is the band's only release with vocalist Chris Blair and guitarist Ernie Flores.

It is considered by many journalists to be an essential release in the deathcore genre.

== Music ==
Allegiance is a melodic metalcore/deathcore album that has been compared to the works of At the Gates, Unearth and Killswitch Engage. As Blood Runs Black utilizes various elements of death metal, melodic death metal and hardcore punk, and employs musical features such as death growls, shouts, shrieks, tremolo picking, double kick and blast beat drums, drop-tuned breakdowns and melodic guitar solos. Revolver stated that the band "were relative outliers in the scene who made screechy deathcore that borrowed equally from the Gothenburg metalcore sound and their deathcore-adjacent peers in the Black Dahlia Murder." Metal Injection stated that the album "was really written for both fan bases", while further comparing the sound to Avenged Sevenfold to All Shall Perish. Alternative Press said the album "brings nasty machine precision in breakdowns, slows them down and bashes listeners over the head again with a heavier moment." The album makes use of gang vocals.

== Background ==
As Blood Runs Black was formed in 2003 in Los Angeles by vocalists Louie Ruvalcaba and Enrique "Ricky" Martin, guitarists Bijon Roybal and Kyle Hasenstab, bassist Richard Reyes, and drummer Brian "Animal" Matute. Matute would depart the band shortly after its formation and was replaced by Hector "Lech" De Santiago. The band recorded a demo in 2004 and another one in 2005; both demos featured the songs "Hester Prynne" and "In Dying Days", both of which would be re-recorded for Allegiance.

After the 2005 demo, the band was preparing to enter the studio to record its debut album, but every member except De Santiago left the band. De Santiago recruited vocalist Chris Blair, guitarist Ernie Flores, and bassist Nick Stewart to resume work on the band's debut. This lineup would record the Halloween of Massacre demo, which featured the songs "In Dying Days", "My Fears..." (later re-titled "My Fears Have Become Phobias"), "Hester Prynne", and "Chug Chug" (later re-titled "Strife (Chug Chug)"); all four songs would be re-recorded for Allegiance.

Allegiance was recorded in early 2006 and was self-produced by the band, with Baron Bodnar serving as executive producer.

== Reception ==
Reviewers complimented the album's musicianship. Reviewers criticized the lack of differentiation between the album's tracks.

In 2024, Metal Injection included the album in their list of "10 Deathcore Albums That Aged Incredibly Well".

Professional ratings
Review scores
Source	Rating
Allmusic	2.5/5 stars
Blogcritics	8/10 stars

== Track listing ==
All tracks are written by As Blood Runs Black.

No.	Title	Length
1.	"Intro" (Instrumental)	0:57
2.	"In Dying Days"	3:41
3.	"My Fears Have Become Phobias"	3:59
4.	"Hester Prynne"	3:38
5.	"Pouring Reign" (Instrumental)	3:13
6.	"The Brighter Side of Suffering"	4:54
7.	"The Beautiful Mistake"	4:34
8.	"Strife (Chug Chug)"	3:46
9.	"Beneath the Surface"	4:38
10.	"Legends Never Die"	3:44
Total length:		37:04

== Credits ==
As Blood Runs Black

- Chris Blair – vocals
- Ernie Flores – guitar
- Nick Stewart – bass
- Hector "Lech" De Santiago – drums

Production

- Produced by As Blood Runs Black
- Recorded by Zack Ohren @ Castle Ultimate Studios
- Executive Producer & Management – Baron Bodnar

Artwork

- Layout by Calvin Exline
