= Montreal Assault =

Video by Despised Icon
- Released: 27 January 2009
- Recorded: June 5, 2008 at Club Soda in Montreal, Quebec, Canada
- Genre: Deathcore
- Length: 93:01
- Label: Century Media
- Director: Yannick St-Amand
- Producer: Yannick St-Amand; David Brodsky

Despised Icon chronology
The Ills of Modern Man (2007)	Montreal Assault (2009)	Day of Mourning (2009)

Montreal Assault is the first DVD by Canadian deathcore band Despised Icon, released January 27, 2009 through Century Media. The DVD was peaked at #123 on the Billboard Top Music Videos.

== Background ==
Montreal Assault features the band performing on June 5, 2008 at Club Soda in their hometown, Montreal, Quebec, Canada. The show was filmed by David Brodsky with sound produced by Yannick St-Amand, Despised Icon's former guitarist. The DVD also features an hour-long documentary by Reconstructed Media that retraces the band's career, showing never-before-released footage.

Vocalist Alexandre Erian stated:

The live mix sounds so massive. It was done by none other than our former guitarist Yannick St-Amand. You can even listen to it in 5.1 Surround. Our buddy Felix also created some of his sickest artwork yet. The shooting and editing of the show went awesome. David Brodsky and his team captured tons of adrenaline-packed moments."

== Track listing ==
All tracks are written by Despised Icon

DVD A
No.	Title	Length
1.	"Intro / The Sunset Will Never Charm Us"	4:16
2.	"Furtive Monologue"	3:40
3.	"Sheltered Reminiscence"	4:17
4.	"Retina"	3:13
5.	"Harvesting the Deceased"	4:40
6.	"Compelled to Copulate"	4:40
7.	"The Ills of Modern Man"	5:35
8.	"Immaculate"	5:04
9.	"A Fractured Hand"	5:06
10.	"Warm Blooded"	6:50
11.	"Bulletproof Scales"	1:46
12.	"In the Arms of Perdition"	5:11
13.	"Fainted Blue Ornaments"	8:21

DVD B
No.	Title	Length
1.	"Documentary"
2.	"Music Videos"
3.	"Road Clips"

== Personnel ==
Despised Icon

- Alexandre Erian – lead vocals
- Steve Marois – lead vocals
- Sebastien Piché – bass
- Eric Jarrin – guitars
- Al Glassman – guitars
- Alexandre Pelletier – drums

Production

- David Brodsky – filming, editing
- Yannick St-Amand – sound production
- Felix Rancourt – cover artwork
