= Deadweight =

Deadweight or dead weight may refer to:

== Music ==
- Deadweight (band), a San Francisco alternative hard rock trio
- Deadweight (album), an album by Wage War
- "Deadweight" (song), a 1997 song by Beck from the film A Life Less Ordinary
- "Deadweight", a song by I Prevail from Trauma
- "Deadweight", a song by Oceans Ate Alaska from Hikari
- "Deadweight", a song by Parkway Drive from Deep Blue
- "Deadweight", a song by Roam from Backbone
- "Deadweight", a song by Wolves at the Gate from Eulogies
- "Deadweight", a song by Beach Bunny from Emotional Creature
- "Dead Weight", a song by Atreyu from Baptize
- "Dead Weight", a song by Despised Icon from Purgatory
- "Dead Weight", a song by Pvris from Use Me

== Television ==
- "Dead Weight" (The Walking Dead), an episode of the television series The Walking Dead
- "Dead Weight" (1971), season 1, episode 3 of the TV series Columbo

== Other uses ==
- Deadweight loss, a loss of economic efficiency that can occur when equilibrium for a good or service is not Pareto optimal
- Deadweight tonnage, a ship's carrying capacity, which includes cargo, fuel, crew, etc.
- Dead weight or dressed weight, the weight of an animal carcass after removal of skin, head, feet, visceral organs, etc.

== See also ==
- Structural load, one type of this is dead load, the fixed weight of a structure, such as a bridge on its supports
