= Despised Icon =

Canadian deathcore band

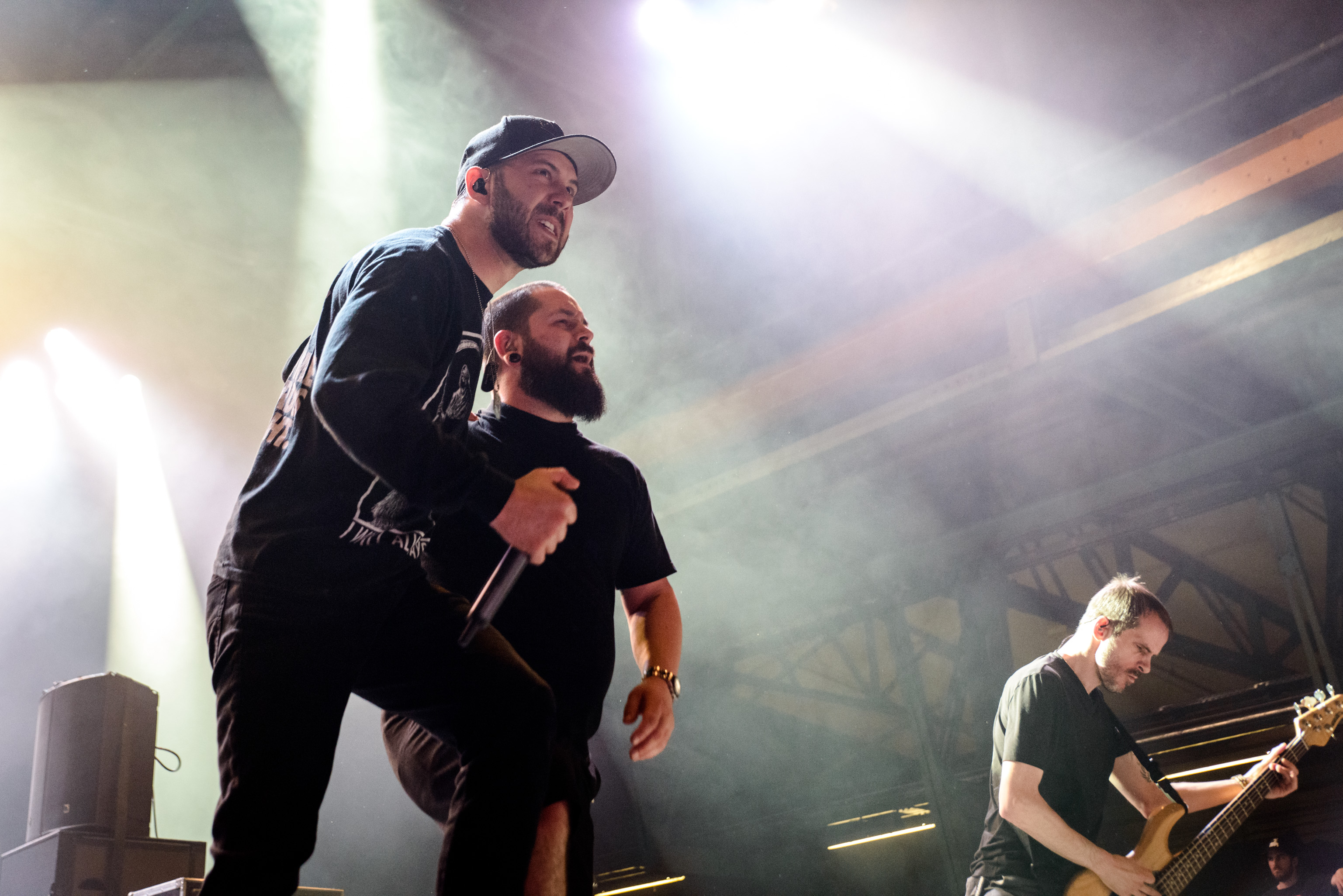
- From left to right: vocalists Alex Erian, Steve Marois and bassist Sebastien Piché.

Background information
- Origin: Montreal, Quebec, Canada
- Genre: Deathcore
- Years active: 2002–2010; 2014–present
- Labels: Nuclear Blast; Century Media; Galy; Relapse
- Spinoffs: Obey the Brave
- Members: Steve Marois; Alex Erian; Eric Jarrin; Alex Pelletier; Ben Landreville; Sebastien Piché
- Past members: Marie-Hélène Landry; Al Glassman; Max Lavelle; Yannick St-Amand
- Website: despisedicon.com

Despised Icon is a Canadian deathcore band from Montreal, Quebec. Formed in 2002, the band is noted for its drummer, Alex Pelletier, who frequently uses the blasting technique, as well as for its dual lead vocalists, Alex Erian and Steve Marois. They are credited as pioneers of deathcore, alongside Antagony and The Red Chord.

In April 2010, the band disbanded, but officially reformed six years later in April 2016, after playing reunion shows in 2014 and 2015. The group has released seven full-length albums and gone through very few lineup changes throughout their run.

== History ==
=== Consumed by Your Poison (2002–2004) ===
Despised Icon was founded in January 2002 in Montreal, Quebec, Canada. Shortly after their formation, the group signed with Galy Records, and released their debut album, Consumed by Your Poison, in October of that year. The following year, Despised Icon underwent several lineup changes. In early 2004, the group returned with a new formation, consisting of two vocalists, Steve Marois and Alex Erian, guitarists Yannick St-Amand and Eric Jarrin, bassist Sebastien Piche, and drummer Alex Pelletier, and recorded the self-financed EP Syndicated Murderers, followed by a split EP with Bodies in the Gears of the Apparatus, issued through Relapse Records.

=== The Healing Process (2005–2006) ===
Despised Icon signed a worldwide deal with Century Media in January 2005. Despised Icon released their second studio album, The Healing Process, through the label on April 5, 2005. It was produced by the band's guitarist Yannick St-Amand, mixed by Jean-Francois Dagenais and mastered by Alan Douches.

Despised Icon toured in support of The Healing Process in 2005, alongside artists including Cryptopsy, Quo Vadis, Vader, Suffocation, Aborted, Immolation, and Deicide, and continued touring into 2006 with Through the Eyes of the Dead, Ed Gein, Morbid Angel, Behemoth, Hatebreed, Exodus, The Black Dahlia Murder and Napalm Death. During the same year, their debut album, Consumed by Your Poison, was re-released through Century Media. In early 2007, they toured supporting Unearth, along with Job for a Cowboy and Dååth.

=== The Ills of Modern Man, Day of Mourning, and breakup (2007–2010) ===
The band's third studio album, The Ills of Modern Man, was recorded and released in 2007 through Century Media Records and was produced by their former guitarist, Yannick St. Amand. That summer, they toured supporting Job for a Cowboy along with The Faceless and A Life Once Lost. Following that, they toured supporting Suicide Silence, along with Winds of Plague. In the winter of that year, they toured with The Acacia Strain, Full Blown Chaos, The Tony Danza Tapdance Extravaganza, and Ligeia. They toured supporting Misery Index, along with Beneath the Massacre and Man Must Die. On June 18, 2008, original bassist Sebastien Piché left the band due to having a full-time job and being a new father. Piché was replaced with Max Lavelle from Goratory. They were on the 2008 Summer Slaughter Tour alongside The Black Dahlia Murder, Vader, Cryptopsy, The Faceless, Aborted, Born of Osiris, Psycroptic, and Whitechapel.

In late October 2008, Despised Icon announced the details of their first DVD, Montreal Assault, released on January 27, 2009. The DVD features a multi-camera shoot from the band's sold-out hometown show, along with a documentary, in addition to all their music videos. It was intended to be released on January 17, but was delayed due to manufacturing problems. In December 2008, guitarist Al Glassman left Despised Icon to join Job for a Cowboy to replace their original guitarist, Ravi Bhadriraju. During their 2009 Montreal Assault Tour, Despised Icon announced that they were recording a new studio album, Day of Mourning, released on September 22, 2009, by Century Media Records. On July 17, 2009, Despised Icon released "MVP" as the first song off of Day of Mourning onto the web. They played on the 2009 Thrash and Burn Tour alongside DevilDriver, Emmure, Veil of Maya, For the Fallen Dreams, Oceano, Periphery, MyChildren MyBride, and Thy Will Be Done. Their fourth album, Day of Mourning, was released on September 22, 2009, and reached No. 162 on the Billboard 200 as of September 30, 2009. A music video was made and released for the title track.

On April 7, 2010, Despised Icon announced that they would disband. They explained that this was due to the members of the band reaching "a new chapter in their lives, starting families, buying houses and pursuing other careers to make it all happen. Writing music, touring and leaving home for months at a time is slowly becoming impossible because of that. We all decided that it’d be best to pull the plug now and end things right." Their farewell European tour included appearances at the Hevy Music Festival on August 7, 2010, near Folkestone, UK and Wacken Open Air in Germany.

During 2010, Despised Icon played their United States, Australia, Japan, European, and Canadian Tour. On December 2, 2010, Despised Icon performed their final four shows in Toronto (December 2 and 3) with The Acacia Strain, Ion Dissonance and Oceano, Ontario, and their hometown of Montreal, Quebec (December 4 and 5). These shows included their current line-up as well as past members from their first two records. Since the disbandment, Alexandre Erian formed metalcore band Obey the Brave with former Blind Witness bassist, Miguel Lepage, and guitarist, John Campbell, as well as Darkness Rites guitarist Greg Wood, and drummer Stevie Morotti. Max Lavelle plays bass for The Black Dahlia Murder. Eric Jarrin rejoined his progressive band Heaven's Cry, with whom he was performing when he founded Despised Icon. They released the album Wheels of Impermanence through Prosthetic Records in September 2012.

=== Reunion shows, comeback and Beast (2014–2018) ===
On February 4, 2014, the band announced via their Facebook page that they would reunite to play several live shows in the upcoming spring. The band would consist of all members of The Healing Process era except guitarist Ben Landreville. Founding member Yannick St. Amand returned to handle the band's audio samples and live sound, making the group a septet for the first time.

In April 2014, they participated in the Impericon Festival Tour across Europe and headlined a handful of shows with support from Brutality Will Prevail and Cerebral Bore. They performed at Montebello's Amnesia Rockfest in Canada on June 20, 2014.

They closed 2014 with four North American concerts on the east coast, playing Montreal, Toronto, New York City and Worcester in December.

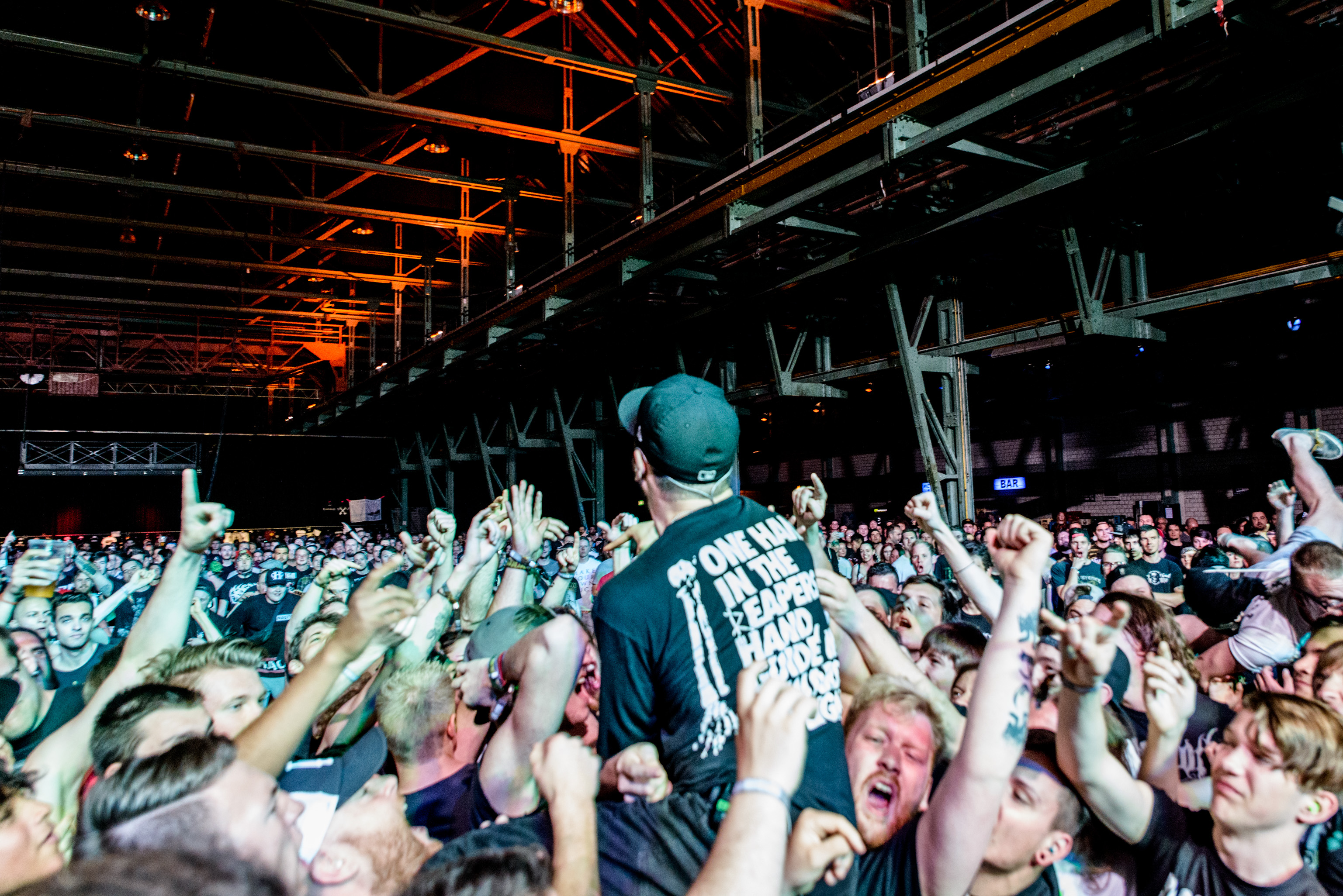
Despised Icon performing at the 2016 Impericon Festival in Munich, Germany.

On April 6, 2015, the band announced via their Facebook page that to commemorate the 10 year anniversary of the release of their album The Healing Process, they would perform exclusive shows at U.K.'s Ghostfest and in Canada at Quebec City's Envol & Macadam Festival.

On April 12, 2016, the band announced via their Facebook page that after signing a deal with record label Nuclear Blast, they were officially back as a permanent band. They released a short video with a snippet of unreleased material. Their fifth studio album, Beast, was released on July 22, 2016.

=== Purgatory and Déterré EP (2019–present) ===
On September 20, the band embarked on a North American tour to promote their upcoming album, Purgatory.

Their sixth full-length album, Purgatory, was released on November 15, 2019.

On October 28, 2022, the band released the EP Déterré, which consists of five re-released early tracks.

In the fall of 2023, the band supported Dying Fetus on tour in North America along with the Acacia Strain.

The band released their seventh full-length album, Shadow Work, on October 31, 2025.

== Band members ==
Current

- Steve Marois – vocals (2002–2010, 2014–present)
- Alex Erian – vocals (2004–2010, 2014–present), drums (2002–2004)
- Eric Jarrin – lead guitar (2002–2010, 2014–present)
- Sebastien Piché – bass (2002–2008, 2014–present)
- Alex Pelletier – drums (2004–2010, 2014–present)
- Ben Landreville – rhythm guitar (2009–2010, 2014–present)

Former

- Yannick St-Amand – samples, media (2002–2006, 2014–2019), rhythm guitar (2002–2006)
- Marie-Hélène Landry – vocals (2002–2003)
- Al Glassman – rhythm guitar (2006–2008)
- Max Lavelle – bass (2008–2010)

Timeline

== Discography ==
=== Studio albums ===
List of studio albums, with selected chart positions
Year	Album details	Peak chart positions	
Year	Album details	US	US Heat.
2002	Consumed by Your Poison: Released: October 2, 2002; Label: Galy	—	—
2005	The Healing Process: Released: April 5, 2005; Label: Century Media	—	—
2007	The Ills of Modern Man: Released: May 22, 2007; Label: Century Media	—	28
2009	Day of Mourning: Released: September 22, 2009; Label: Century Media	162	6
2016	Beast: Released: July 22, 2016; Label: Nuclear Blast	—	2
2019	Purgatory: Released: November 15, 2019; Label: Nuclear Blast	—	—
2025	Shadow Work: Released: October 31, 2025; Label: Nuclear Blast	—	—
"—" denotes a recording that did not chart

=== DVDs ===
Year	Album details
2009	Montreal Assault: Released: 2009; Label: Century Media

=== Other releases ===
Year	Album details	Notes
2004	Syndicated Murderers: EP; Released: 2004; Label: Independent	Features two tracks that were later re-recorded for The Healing Process.
2005	Bodies in the Gears of the Apparatus and Despised Icon: Split album with Bodies in the Gears of the Apparatus.; Released: January 11, 2005; Label: Relapse	Features one track that was later re-recorded for Beast.
2006	Demos 2002 & 2004: Demo albums; Released: 2006; Label: Galy	Split with Ion Dissonance, including: .357 demo, 2002 by Ion Dissonance; Syndicated Murderers promo, 2004 by Despised Icon.
2022	Déterré: EP; Released: October 28, 2022; Label: Nuclear Blast	Tracks 1-2 are from the Syndicated Murderers EP released in 2004.; Tracks 3-5 are from split with Bodies in the Gears of the Apparatus released in 2005.

== Music videos ==
Year	Title	Director
2005	"The Sunset Will Never Charm Us"	Jean-Phillipe Bernier
2007	"In the Arms of Perdition"	Jean-Phillipe Bernier
2008	"Furtive Monologue"	Jonathan Desbiens
2009	"Day of Mourning"	Mathieu Elle
2016	"Beast"	Jessy Fuchs
2016	"Bad Vibes"	Jessy Fuchs
2016	"The Aftermath"	Matt Charland
2019	"Purgatory"	Jessy Fuchs
2019	"Snake in the Grass"	Jessy Fuchs
2025	"Over My Dead Body (featuring Matt Honeycutt)"	Mathieu Elle
2025	"Death of an Artist"	Jessy Fuchs
