= Rebirth of the Temple =

Studio album by Silent Civilian
- Released: May 2, 2006
- Genres: Metalcore, thrash metal
- Length: 63:53
- Label: Mediaskare
- Producer: Logan Mader

Silent Civilian chronology
Rebirth of the Temple (2006)	Ghost Stories (2010)

Professional ratings
Review scores
Source	Rating
Blabbermouth	link
AllMusic	link
Sputnikmusic	link
The PRP	link

Rebirth of the Temple is the first studio album by the American metalcore band Silent Civilian. It was released on May 2, 2006 through Mediaskare Records. The album contains two enhanced videos – one music video for the song "Rebirth of the Temple" and a behind-the-scenes look at how the album was made. In the music video, Wayne Static from Static-X and Roy Mayorga from Stone Sour can be seen on the left at the start.

Nearly a year after the album's release, a video for "The Song Remains Un-Named" was released. The video shows the possible tragic effects of alcohol and drug abuse. The edit of the song is different from the album's as not only is the song shortened heavily but, during the chorus, there is an extra lead guitar playing. The title of the song is a parody of Led Zeppelin's "The Song Remains the Same".

"Dead to Me 2006" is not the same song as "Dead to Me" by Jonny Santos' other band Spineshank from the album Self-Destructive Pattern. "2006" was added to the title of the Silent Civilian song to prevent confusion.

The promotional edition of this album has a bonus track at track 11, "Blood Red Sky" (4:43).

== Track listing ==
No.	Title	Length
1.	"A Call to Arms" (instrumental)	1:24
2.	"Funeral"	6:14
3.	"The Song Remains Un-Named"	5:54
4.	"Rebirth of the Temple"	4:12
5.	"Divided"	6:07
6.	"Bitter Pill"	3:44
7.	"Force Fed"	3:44
8.	"Lies in the House of Shame"	7:32
9.	"Wrath"	5:53
10.	"Dead to Me 2006"	5:06
11.	"First Amendment"	4:34
12.	"Falling Down"	3:08
13.	"Live Again"	6:21
Total length:		63:53

== Personnel ==
- Jonny Santos – lead vocals, guitars
- Henno – bass guitar, backing vocals
- Chris Mora – drums

Additional musicians

- Tim Mankowski (credited as Tim Mankski) - guitars
