= Stand Your Ground =

Stand Your Ground may refer to:

== Legal concepts ==
- Stand-your-ground law, a law in some jurisdictions that authorizes a person to protect and defend one's own life and limb against threat or perceived threat
- Castle doctrine, variant of the law in the US, against intrusion of one's dwelling

== Literature ==
- Stand Your Ground (novel), a book by Eric Walters

== Music ==
- Stand Your Ground (Wild Horses album), 1981
- Stand Your Ground (Juluka album), 1984
- Stand Your Ground (Little Barrie album), 2006
- Stand Your Ground (Mike Tramp album), 2011
- Stand Your Ground (band), an American Christian hardcore band

== Television ==
- "Stand Your Ground" (CSI: Miami episode)

== See also ==
- Duty to retreat, law requiring a person to retreat whenever possible rather than retaliate in self-defence, as opposed to stand-your-ground law
