= Ghost Stories (Silent Civilian album) =

Studio album by Silent Civilian
- Released: May 18, 2010
- Genres: Metalcore, thrash metal
- Length: 47:43
- Label: Mediaskare
- Producer: Jonny Santos

Silent Civilian chronology
Rebirth of the Temple (2006)	Ghost Stories (2010)

Professional ratings
Review scores
Source	Rating
Live-Metal.net	10/10 stars
MetalEater.com	(A)
Sputnikmusic	3/5 stars
Thenewreview.net	3.5/5 stars

Ghost Stories is the second studio album by American metalcore band Silent Civilian, the follow-up to Rebirth of the Temple. It was released on May 18, 2010.

About the album, Jonny Santos was quoted as saying, "Musically, this record is very different from the last, but evolution is the key to longevity, in my eyes. I believe we are making a record that will retain what is the main essence of Silent Civilian, but maturing greatly pushing forward." Speaking about the darker themed lyrics, Santos explained "I went from being in a pretty solid relationship, having a house and a wife to sleeping on the recording studio floor and losing it all. I was in a really dark place when writing the lyrics to this record. I had a lot of animosity to certain people in my life at the time and it just reflected through my writing."

The album debuted at No. 21 on the top new artist albums (Heatseekers) chart, moving roughly 1,600 copies during its first week of release.

The first single to be released off the album was "Last One Standing". The video depicts the band playing amid scenes of soldiers fighting and being attacked in a Middle Eastern environment, along with flashes of a suburban home-life. The video was shot by director Scott Hansen, who has previously worked with A Day to Remember, Alesana and A Skylit Drive.

== Track listing ==
No.	Title	Length
1.	"Let Us Prey"	4:54
2.	"Victim of Fear"	3:54
3.	"The Phoenix"	4:43
4.	"Ghost Stories"	5:28
5.	"Sustenance"	3:33
6.	"Cast the First Stone"	3:48
7.	"Last One Standing"	4:03
8.	"Atonement"	3:18
9.	"Murder One"	5:15
10.	"Dressed in Black"	3:41
11.	"The Gift (Feeding Time)"	5:06
Total length:		47:43

== Personnel ==
- Jonny Santos – lead vocals, guitars
- Ryan Halpert – drums
- Robbie Young – bass guitar
- Matt Bredemeier – guitars
