= Punishment (album) =

Studio album by Endwell
- Released: April 26, 2011
- Genres: Metalcore; hardcore punk
- Length: 46:29
- Label: Mediaskare
- Producers: Sean Murphy; Danny Pupplo

Endwell chronology
Consequences (2009)	Punishment (2011)

Professional ratings
Review scores
Source	Rating
Alternative Press	Positive
Under the Gun Review	7/10

Punishment is the third studio album released by American hardcore band Endwell. Punishment was released on April 26, 2011 and is the band's second studio album release after signing with Mediaskare Records. Endwell has stated that there was a black metal influence on this album, noticeable on tracks such as "Dark Waves", "Plague Wielders", and "Fractal Gloom".

== Track listing ==
All tracks are written by Endwell. Co-writers are noted.

No.	Title	Writer(s)	Length
1.	"Greater Haste"		3:00
2.	"Anxiety Bath" (featuring Frankie Palmeri)	Palmeri	3:46
3.	"Depression Party" (featuring JJ Peters)	Peters	2:48
4.	"Dark Waves" (featuring Mean Pete)	Peter Kowalsky, Christopher Jornet	4:15
5.	"Forgotten Wolves"		2:35
6.	"Mason Lamps"		2:30
7.	"High Friends in Low Places" (featuring Phil Vibez)	Phil Vasquez	1:56
8.	"Living Reverie"		2:30
9.	"Black Horns"		3:39
10.	"Negative Pressure"		2:57
11.	"Plague Wielders" (featuring Sean Bennett)	Bennett	3:22
12.	"Laments"		5:01
13.	"Fractal Gloom"		8:10

== Personnel ==
Endwell

- Sean Murphy – vocals
- Danny Pupplo – guitar
- Matt Rogers – guitar
- Pieter VanDenberg – bass
- Mike Sciulara – drums

Production

- Steve Evetts – mixing
- Alan Douches – mastering
- Sean Murphy & Danny Pupplo – production
