= Revenge Is a Healthy Motive =

EP by Endwell
- Released: May 27, 2008
- Recorded: April 2008
- Studio: B Gold Studios and Studio Six
- Genre: Hardcore punk; melodic hardcore; metalcore
- Length: 14:17
- Label: Mediaskare
- Producer: Endwell, Bryan Goldsman, Maniac Aram Abgarian

Endwell chronology
Homeland Insecurity (2006)	Revenge Is a Healthy Motive (2008)	Consequences (2009)

Revenge Is a Healthy Motive is the second EP by American hardcore punk band Endwell. This album is also the first release after switching from Victory Records to Mediaskare.

The album was released exclusively through iTunes, independent music stores, and directly from the band on tour. The EP departs from the band's previous pop punk/hardcore punk mix and focuses strictly on hardcore. Commenting on the new release, Endwell stated that, "Basically we just wanted to make a record that was hard emotionally and musically. We wanted to write an album that we could enjoy and that made us feel like we did when we started playing hardcore when we were little kids." The album is also expected to be released as a 7" vinyl with slightly altered album art featuring "burning" or red imagery in the background of the title and foreground of the car.

The album art was created by Dimitri Minakakis, former lead singer of The Dillinger Escape Plan. He has also created album art for Poison the Well's album Versions and The Dillinger Escape Plan's album Miss Machine with his new graphic design company, Pronto Workshop.

== Track listing ==
1. "Mike Tyson" – 1:53
2. "Jumping the Shark" – 3:35
3. "Revenge Is a Healthy Motive" – 2:56
4. "Glaciers" – 2:20
5. "Sympathy for All Sufferers" – 4:13

== Personnel ==
- Sean Murphy: vocals
- Danny Pupplo: guitar
- Matt Rogers: bass
- Dustin Newcombe: guitar
- Mean Gene: drums
- Recorded by Bryan Goldsman and Maniac Aram Abgarian
- Mixed by Bryan Goldsman
