= Day of Mourning (album) =

Studio album by Despised Icon
- Released: September 22, 2009
- Recorded: 2009
- Studio: Projecson Recording Studio
- Genre: Deathcore
- Length: 35:12
- Languages: English, French
- Label: Century Media
- Producer: Yannick St-Amand

Despised Icon chronology
The Ills of Modern Man (2007)	Day of Mourning (2009)	Beast (2016)

Day of Mourning is the fourth studio album by Canadian deathcore band Despised Icon. It was released on September 22, 2009 through Century Media Records. The album is featured in four different editions, including; the standard, the United States exclusive Hot Topic edition, the Europe Exclusive LTD digipak edition, the iTunes edition and the Japanese edition.

== Background ==
Day of Mourning was recorded during early 2009 at Projecson Recording Studio and was produced by their former guitarist, Yannick St-Amand, and was mixed by Andreas Magnusson and mastered by Alan Douches. The album marks the first Despised Icon release to feature guitarist Ben Landreville and bassist Max Lavelle in the band.

The song "MVP" was released as the album's first single on July 17, 2009. The title track was released as the album's second single and had a music video produced for it which was directed by Montreal hip hop video production company, Kartel Films. The song "Day of Mourning" is also featured as downloadable content for the Rock Band video games via the Rock Band Network.

== Reception ==
Professional ratings
Review scores
Source	Rating
About.com	3.5/5 stars
AllMusic	3.5/5 stars
Blabbermouth	7/10

The album reached number 162 on the Billboard 200 and number 6 on the Billboard Top Heatseekers, selling 3,000 copies its first week of release.

== Track listing ==
No.	Title	Lyrics	Music	Length
1.	"Les Temps Changent"	Erian	Jarrin, Erian	3:29
2.	"Day of Mourning"	Erian	Jarrin, Erian	3:03
3.	"MVP"	Erian, Marois, McCoughey, McCoughry	Jarrin, Pelletier	3:25
4.	"All for Nothing"	Marois	Landreville, Lavelle	3:15
5.	"Eulogy"	Marois	Jarrin, Pelletier	3:29
6.	"Made of Glass"	Erian	Jarrin, Erian	3:18
7.	"Black Lungs"	Erian	Jarrin, Erian	3:02
8.	"Diva of Disgust"	Marois	Jarrin, Erian	3:26
9.	"Entre le Bien et le Mal"	Erian	Jarrin, Erian	3:58
10.	"Sleepless"	Marois	Jarrin	4:47
Total length:				35:12

iTunes edition bonus tracks
No.	Title	Length
11.	"Five One Four"	3:01
Total length:		38:13

== Credits ==
Writing, performance and production credits are adapted from the album liner notes.

=== Personnel ===
Despised Icon

- Alex Erian – vocals
- Steve Marois – vocals
- Eric Jarrin – guitar
- Ben Landreville – guitar, gang vocals
- Max Lavelle – bass guitar
- Alex Pelletier – drums

Additional musicians

- Kevin McCoughey (Ion Dissonance) – gang vocals
- Gabriel McCoughry (ex-Ion Dissonance) – gang vocals
- Elliot Desgagné (Beneath the Massacre) – gang vocals
- Ghyslain Fredet – gang vocals
- Sebastien Painchaud (ex-Ion Dissonance) – gang vocals
- Chris Donaldson (Cryptopsy) – gang vocals

Production

- Yannick St-Amand – production, engineering
- Chris Donaldson – recording (gang vocals only)
- Eric Jarrin – recording (guitar solos only)
- Andreas Magnusson – mixing
- Alan Douches – mastering

Artwork and design

- Felix Rancourt – artwork, layout

=== Studios ===
- Northern Studio, QC, Canada – production, engineering
- Garage Studio, QC, Canada – recording (gang vocals only)
- Eric Jarrin's place, QC, Canada – recording (guitar solos only)
- Planet Red Studio, VA, USA – mixing
- West West Side Music, NJ, USA – mastering

== Charts ==
Chart	Peak position
US Billboard 200	162
US Heatseekers Albums (Billboard)	6
