= Ground Zero (As Blood Runs Black album) =

Studio album by As Blood Runs Black
- Released: October 27, 2014
- Genre: Deathcore, metalcore
- Length: 33:07
- Label: StandBy Records
- Producer: As Blood Runs Black

As Blood Runs Black chronology
Instinct (2011)	Ground Zero (2014)

Singles from Ground Zero
- 1. "Insomniac" Released: August 18, 2014; 2. "All or Nothing" Released: September 17, 2014; 3. "Vision" Released: November 10, 2014

Professional ratings
Review scores
Source	Rating
New Noise	Mixed
Pop Matters	7/10
Prelude Press	4/5

Ground Zero is the third studio album by the American deathcore band As Blood Runs Black. It was released on October 27, 2014. It is the band's first album with the vocalist Christopher Bartholomew. The songs "Insomniac", "Vision", "An Oath", and "Eulogy" have clean vocals, a first for the band.

== History ==
Crowdfunding for the album began on June 30, 2013, and ended on September 29, 2013. Due to numerous setbacks (robbery, being dropped from their record label, several lineup changes — including then-vocalist Sonik Garcia) - many fans speculated that the band might not produce their third album. According to the drummer Hector "Lech" De Santiago, on August 11, 2014, the band was splitting up. A week later, on August 18, the band released the first single from the album, titled "Insomniac", and announced a final North America farewell tour to support the album beginning in fall 2014. The band intended to part ways on concluding the tour.

== Track listing ==
All lyrics are written by Greg Kirkpatrick, Dan Sugarman and Chris Bartholomew; all music is composed by Dan Sugarman, Nick Stewart and Hector "Lech" De Santiago.

No.	Title	Length
1.	"City Limits"	1:40
2.	"Insomniac"	3:49
3.	"Ground Zero"	3:43
4.	"Vision"	4:06
5.	"All or Nothing"	3:31
6.	"Chapters" (Instrumental)	2:07
7.	"An Oath"	3:34
8.	"Eulogy"	3:27
9.	"Surrender"	3:11
10.	"Survival Rites"	3:59
Total length:		33:07

=== Notes ===
Several tracks are listed under different titles on streaming services.

- ”Insomniac” is listed as “Wasteland”.
- ”Chapters” is listed as “Rumple”.
- ”Surrender is listed as “Limitless”.
- ”Survival Rites” is listed as “Survival Rights”.

== Credits ==
As Blood Runs Black

- Christopher Bartholomew – vocals
- Dan Sugarman – lead guitar
- Greg Kirkpatrick – rhythm guitar
- Nick Stewart – bass
- Hector "Lech" De Santiago – drums

Additional musicians

- Volumes – group vocals
- Thy Art Is Murder – group vocals

Production

- Zack Ohren – mixing, mastering
- Justin Fields – album artwork
- Daniel McBride – layout, additional art
- Greg Ontiveros – band photo
- Christopher Bianchi - management
