= Sharptooth =

American hardcore punk band

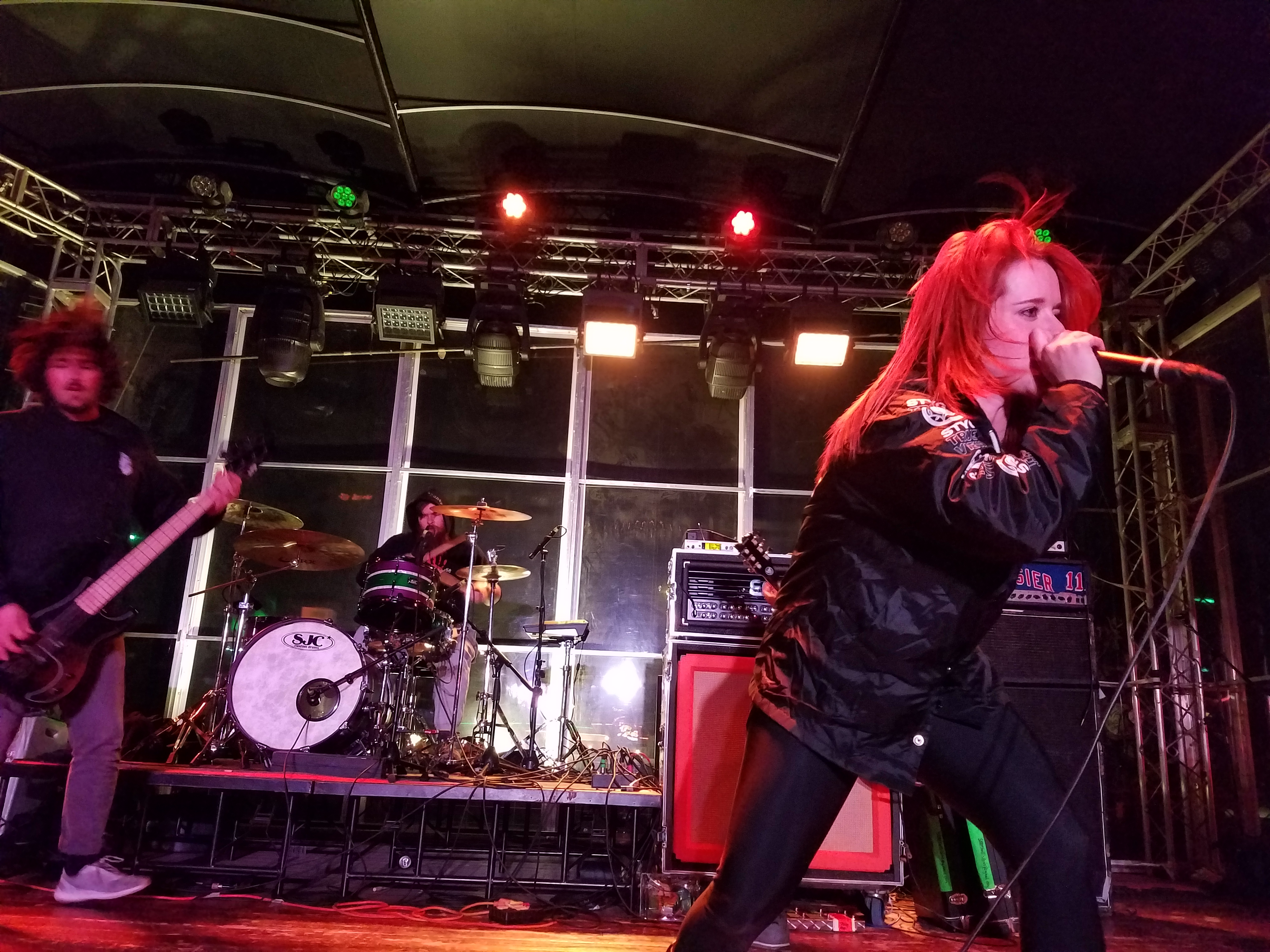
- Sharptooth performing in 2018

Background information
- Origin: Baltimore, Maryland, United States
- Genres: Hardcore punk; metallic hardcore; melodic hardcore
- Years active: 2013–2023
- Label: Pure Noise
- Past members: Lauren Kashan; Keith Higgins; Lance Donati; Peter Bruno; Matt Hague; Marissa Ward
- Website: www.sharptoothmerch.com

Sharptooth was an American hardcore punk band from Baltimore, Maryland, United States. Formed in 2013, the band released two EPs and two studio albums before disbanding in 2023.

Lead singer Lauren Kashan left the band in 2021, citing an abusive working situation. Following Sharptooth's breakup, lead singer Marissa Ward described similar mistreatment from the other members.

== History ==
In May 2017, Sharptooth signed to Pure Noise Records. The label features other bands such as Knocked Loose, Senses Fail, and Less Than Jake.

In early 2018, the ensemble toured with Anti-Flag, Stray from the Path and The White Noise. In May 2018, they then went on to tour with Senses Fail. In mid-2018, the ensemble performed on every date of the last full US run of the Vans Warped Tour. The quintet also opened for the first Cane Hill headlining tour in late 2018, and supported As It Is in early 2019.

In April 2019, the ensemble recorded their second studio album, and travelled Europe with hardcore bands Comeback Kid, No Turning Back and Jesus Piece. Once their tour in the Eastern Hemisphere was complete, it was followed in May 2019 by four concerts in Canada with Boundaries, Sudden Waves, Harriers and Cold Shoulder all supporting Canadian metal group Obey the Brave.

In September 2019, the quintet returned to Canada to perform alongside Canadian punk rock bands Single Mothers and Cancer Bats, and stated that they were working on their second studio album. In November, the band released singles "Mean Brain" and "Die for the Government", the latter being featured on Hopeless Records compilation album Songs That Saved My Life Vol. 2.

In May 2020, the group published "Say Nothing (In The Absence Of Content)", the first music video for Transitional Forms, their second studio album, released on 9 July 2020. Almost one month later, the ensemble released "The Gray", another single from their upcoming album.

On July 10, 2020, the band released their sophomore album, Transitional Forms. The day before the band also released a music video for their new song "Evolution (ft. Justin Sane from Anti-Flag)" premiering on revolvermag.com

On August 28, 2022, Lauren Kashan made an announcement on Instagram informing fans she had left the band over a year prior, citing a negative work environment and inability to self-express. The band responded on Instagram, saying they "will not be performing any songs written while Lauren was in the band", and that they are taking "a new direction." On August 31, 2022, the band made an announcement introducing Marissa Ward, former vocalist of beatdown hardcore band Backswing, as their new vocalist, while also announcing that they released a new single "I Didn't Ask to Be Here", that same day. Sharptooth's only EP with Ward on vocals, Imperfect Animal, was released on October 31, 2022.

On November 28, 2023, Sharptooth announced their disbandment via a cryptic post on the band's social media pages, featuring an image stating "2013-2023" with the message "Thank You", and removed the Imperfect Animal EP from streaming services. Shortly afterwards, Marissa Ward released a statement on Instagram stating that the band had quietly disbanded months before, while also stating that she experienced very similar circumstances as Kashan, claiming that the band "belittled, mocked, disrespected and tokenized" her during her time with Sharptooth.

== Critical reception ==
Vince Bellino of Decibel magazine stated that the group has "earned a reputation up and down the east coast for their fierce political message and chaotic live shows".

Metal Injection reviewed Clever Girl as "10/10" and referred to the album as "an explosive hardcore record that packs tons of aggressive blends of sound, and shows off lots of impressive techniques in the instrumental playing" as well as "an educational experience: for the things happening around us, the fears we’ve never had to experience, or the issues we may have not even been aware of".

Metal Hammer named Transitional Forms as the 39th best metal album of 2020.

== Members ==
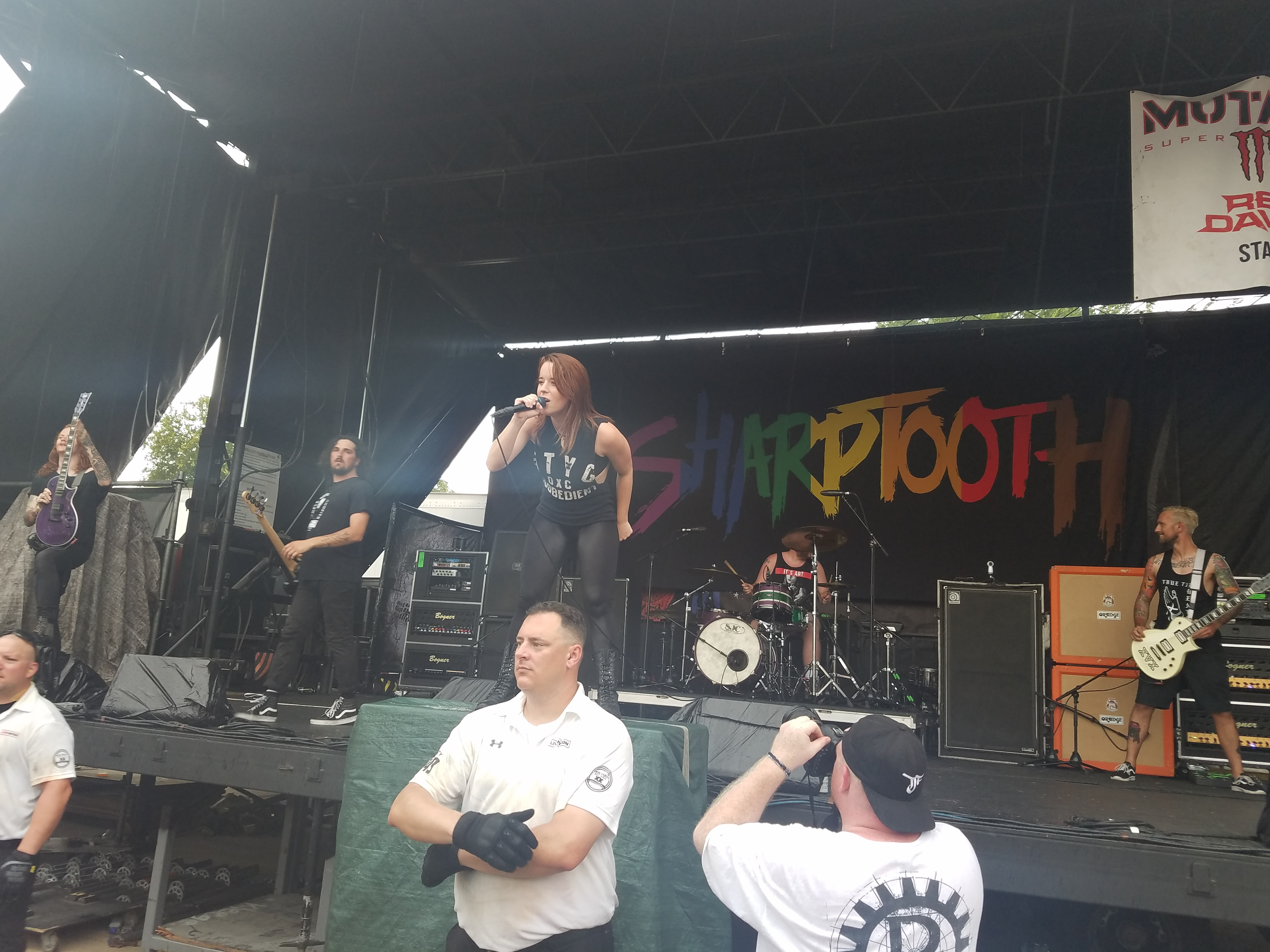
Sharptooth performing at the Vans Warped Tour in 2018

=== Final lineup ===
- Marissa Ward - vocals (2022–2023)
- Keith Higgins - guitars
- Lance Donati - guitars
- Matthew Ryan - drums

=== Former members ===
- Lauren Kashan - vocals (2014–2021)
- Peter Bruno - bass
- Phil Rasinski - bass
- Conor McNamara - drums
- Josh Hursey - drums
- Jake Drnec - bass

== Discography ==
=== Studio albums ===
- Clever Girl (2017)
- Transitional Forms (2020)

=== EPs ===
- Below The Docks (2014)
- Chompers (2015)
- Imperfect Animal (2022)

=== Videos ===
- "Clever Girl" (2017)
- "Fuck You Donald Trump" (2017)
- "No Sanctuary" (2018)
- "Mean Brain" (2019)
- "Say Nothing (In The Absence Of Content)" (2020)
- "Evolution (ft. Justin Sane from Anti-Flag)" (2020)

=== Singles ===
- "Die for the Government" (2019)
- "The Gray" (2020)
