= Beast (Despised Icon album) =

Studio album by Despised Icon
- Released: July 22, 2016
- Genre: Deathcore
- Length: 29:01
- Label: Nuclear Blast
- Producer: Yannick St-Amand

Despised Icon chronology
Day of Mourning (2009)	Beast (2016)	Purgatory (2019)

Singles from Beast
- 1. "Beast" Released: May 20, 2016; 2. "The Aftermath" Released: June 10, 2016; 3. "Bad Vibes" Released: July 18, 2016

Professional ratings
Review scores
Source	Rating
Metal Hammer	3/5 stars
Metal Injection	8/10
Sputnikmusic	2.5/5

Beast is the fifth studio album by Despised Icon. The album was released on July 22, 2016. It is the band's first album in seven years, since 2009's Day of Mourning. It was produced by former guitarist Yannick St-Amand (known for his production work with Beneath the Massacre and Neuraxis) and mixed by Andy Sneap (known for his production work with Megadeth, Opeth, and Nevermore). The band were inspired to reform and write new music after seeing former bassist Max Lavelle perform with his current band The Black Dahlia Murder.

Despised Icon supported Beast with a European Tour ahead of the album's release, in April and May 2016.

== Track listing ==
1. "The Aftermath" – 3:37
2. "Inner Demons" – 3:12
3. "Drapeau Noir" – 3:07
4. "Bad Vibes" – 2:57
5. "Dedicated to Extinction" – 1:29
6. "Grind Forever" – 3:04
7. "Time Bomb" – 3:09
8. "One Last Martini" – 3:32
9. "Doomed" – 1:40
10. "Beast" – 3:14

== Personnel ==
- Alex Erian – vocals
- Steve Marois – vocals
- Eric Jarrin – guitar
- Ben Landreville – guitar, vocals
- Sébastien Piché – bass guitar, vocals
- Alex Pelletier – drums

== Charts ==
Chart performance for Beast
Chart (2016)	Peak position
Belgian Albums (Ultratop Flanders)	161
US Independent Albums (Billboard)	14
US Top Hard Rock Albums (Billboard)	7
US Top Heatseekers (Billboard)	2
US Top Rock Albums (Billboard)	22
