= In Dying Arms =

American deathcore band

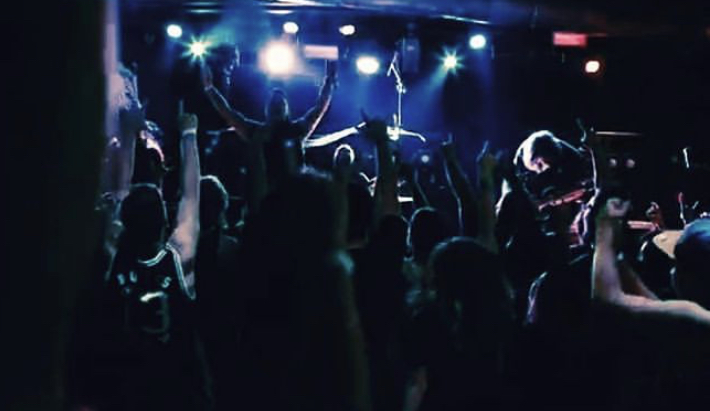
- Performing at Soundstage in 2017

Background information
- Origin: Baltimore, Maryland, U.S.
- Genres: Deathcore; melodic metalcore
- Years active: 2006–2017; 2020–present
- Labels: Matchless; Artery; Tragic Hero
- Members: Orion Stephens; Christian Becker; Noah Williamson; Keith Kohlhepp; Nate White
- Past members: Justin Enriquez; Brandon Cook; Tim Johnson; Jeremy Magee; John Myers; Terence Bright; Alvin Richardson
- Website: facebook.com/indyingarms

In Dying Arms is an American deathcore band from Baltimore, Maryland. The lineup currently consists of Orion Stephens (vocals), Christian Becker and Noah Williamson (guitar, vocals), Keith Kohlhepp (bass) and Nate White (drums).

== History ==
In Dying Arms formed in late 2006 in Baltimore, Maryland the group was founded when a team of friends wanted to start a band similar to the sound of As I Lay Dying. After some MySpace demo recordings and several lineup changes, the first EP, a digital-only release, was released under the title This Is Retaliation independently in September 2009.

After the group completed their first tour in January 2010, the band added guitarist Tim Johnson and a third guitarist Brandon Cook. Shortly after, they began recording their debut album Deprivation. In September of the same year, the band released Deprivation on Matchless Records; the label of the former Chelsea Grin guitarist Chris Kilbourn. Later in the year both Tim Johnson (guitarist) and Brandon Cook (guitarist) left the band with reason unknown. Tim Johnson ended up returning to the band months later.

After the album was receiving positive response within the underground scene, their first single, "Delusions", was released in January 2011. Shortly after the release of "Delusions" guitarist Tim Johnson left the band due to differences in music. In October came the follow-up album, which was self-titled. The group has already played as the opening act for bands such as Motionless in White, Darkest Hour, In This Moment, As Blood Runs Black and Chelsea Grin. In September and October 2011, the group toured as support for Volumes along the west coast of the United States. In September 2012, the Group together with The Last Ten Seconds of Life as the support of King Conquer on their Devastation of the Nation Tour. In Dying Arms performed as the opening-act in selected shows with Dr. Acula on their U.S. tour.

On July 7, 2012, it was announced that the group signed a record deal with Artery Recordings. Their third album Boundaries was released through Artery. They have since left Artery and joined Tragic Hero Recordings. On April 22, 2014, In Dying Arms released a lyric video for "Lives On Display" on their YouTube channel. It was announced through Facebook in late 2014, that guitarist Jeremy Magee would be replaced by Christian Becker. Magee left on good terms with the band to focus more on his personal life. On November 18, 2016, the band announced the departure of guitarist John Myers. On July 7, 2017, the band announced Ian Wilmot as the latest guitarist.

On October 7, 2017, the band released their new single "Cold Skin", along with a lyric video on their YouTube channel.

On November 4, 2017, the band announced its separation and a farewell tour. They reformed in 2020 and released the single, "Cold & Empty", in April that year.

== Band members ==
=== Current members ===
- Orion Stephens – lead vocals (2006–present)
- Christian Becker – guitar, clean vocals (2014–2017, 2022–present)
- Noah Williamson – guitar, clean vocals (2020–present)
- Keith Kohlhepp – bass (2020–present)
- Nate White – drums (2020–present)

=== Former members ===
- Jeremy Magee – guitar, clean vocals (2006–2010, 2013–2014)
- Terence Bright – bass (2006–2017)
- Alvin Richardson – drums (2006–2017)
- Justin Enrique – guitar (2007–2012)
- Tim Johnson – guitar (2010–2011)
- Brandon Cook – guitar (2010)
- John "Walter" Myers – guitars (2010–2016)

== Discography ==
Albums

Album title	Release date	Record label
Deprivation	September 7, 2010	Matchless Records
In Dying Arms	October 11, 2011	Matchless Records
Boundaries	September 25, 2012	Artery Recordings
Original Sin	April 1, 2016	Tragic Hero Records
In Dying Arms Re-Issue	October 11, 2017	Independent

Miscellaneous

- Demo (2007)
- Demo (2009)
- This Is Retaliation (EP, 2009)
