= Consumed by Your Poison =

Studio album by Despised Icon
- Released: October 2, 2002
- Recorded: 2002
- Genres: Brutal death metal, deathcore
- Length: 26:39
- Label: Galy
- Producer: Yannick St-Amand

Despised Icon chronology
Consumed by Your Poison (2002)	The Healing Process (2005)

Alternative cover
- Cover of the 2006 re-release.

Professional ratings
Review scores
Source	Rating
Exclaim!	(favourable)

Consumed by Your Poison is the debut studio album by Canadian deathcore band Despised Icon. It was released on October 2, 2002 through Galy Records and re-released on April 4, 2006. It is the band's only album with vocalist Marie-Hélène Landry and the only album on which Alex Erian plays drums, as he switched to vocals after the departure of Landry.

== Critical reception ==
Consumed by Your Poison generally received positive reviews, Greg Pratt of Exclaim! magazine wrote mainly praising the vocals work, stating that both Marie-Hélène Landry and Steve Marois "provide a multitude of sounds not usually heard in the realm of oppressive cookie monster vocals." Overall, Pratt exalt the band's musicianship, saying: "brutal, well played and technically adept, this sounds great, looks great."

== Reissue ==
Consumed by Your Poison was re-released on April 4, 2006 through Century Media Records. It has been remixed by the band's former guitarist Yannick St-Amand—vocalist Alex Erian commented about, saying that "the result [of the new mix] sounds way heavier than the original version"; the album comes with newly recorded bonus tracks of the first two tracks on the disc and features all new artwork and layout designed by Sven de Caluwé from Aborted.

== Track listing ==
No.	Title	Writer(s)	Length
1.	"Compelled to Copulate"	Alexandre Erian, Eric Jarrin, Steve Marois	2:53
2.	"Poissonnariat"	Erian, Jarrin	3:19
3.	"Grade A-One"	Erian, Jarrin, Marois	3:01
4.	"Le Chêne et le Roseau"	Erian, Gregory Bussy, Jarrin	3:04
5.	"Dead King"	Erian, Jarrin, Marois	0:54
6.	"Absolu"	Bussy, Erian, Jarrin	3:43
7.	"Fashionable"	Bussy, Erian, Jarrin, Marois	2:45
8.	"Interfere in Your Days"	Erian, Jarrin, Marois	2:57
9.	"Clef de Voûte"	Erian, Jarrin	3:06
10.	"Despise the Icons"	Erian, Jarrin, Marois	0:57
Total length:			26:39

=== 2006 re-recorded version bonus tracks ===
11. "Poissannariat" (Erian, Jarrin) – 3:29
12. "Compelled to Copulate" (Erian, Jarrin, Marois) – 3:08

== Personnel ==
- Marie-Hélène Landry – vocals
- Steve Marois – vocals
- Eric Jarrin – guitar
- Yannick St-Amand – guitar
- Sebastien Piché – bass
- Alex Erian – drums
