= Shadow Work (Despised Icon album) =

Studio album by Despised Icon
- Released: October 31, 2025
- Recorded: 2025
- Genre: Deathcore
- Length: 36:23
- Label: Nuclear Blast
- Producers: Eric Jarrin, Alex Erian

Despised Icon chronology
Purgatory (2019)	Shadow Work (2025)

Singles from Shadow Work
- 1. "Over My Dead Body" Released: August 8, 2025; 2. "Death of an Artist" Released: September 12, 2025; 3. "The Apparition" Released: October 17, 2025

Professional ratings
Review scores
Source	Rating
Blabbermouth.net	8.5/10
Distorted Sound	8/10

Shadow Work is the seventh studio album by Despised Icon. The album was released on October 31, 2025. Similarly to the previous album Purgatory, it was produced by co-lead vocalist Alex Erian and lead guitarist Eric Jarrin, with mixing and mastering by Christian Donaldson (Cryptopsy, Shadow of Intent, Signs of the Swarm), as well as cover art by Eliran Kantor (Hatebreed, Thy Art Is Murder, Cavalera Conspiracy). Production of the album was first announced in February 2025. Music videos were released for the tracks "Death of an Artist" and "The Apparition".

== Track listing ==
No.	Title	Length
1.	"Shadow Work"	2:57
2.	"Over My Dead Body" (featuring Matt Honeycutt of Kublai Khan)	3:27
3.	"Death of an Artist"	3:41
4.	"Corpse Pose"	3:23
5.	"The Apparition"	4:10
6.	"Reaper" (featuring Scott Lewis of Carnifex and Tom Barber of Chelsea Grin)	3:24
7.	"In Memoriam" (featuring Misstiq)	3:19
8.	"Omen of Misfortune"	3:02
9.	"Obsessive Compulsive Disorder"	3:29
10.	"ContreCoeur"	1:32
11.	"Fallen Ones"	3:59
Total length:		36:23

== Personnel ==
- Alex Erian – vocals
- Steve Marois – vocals
- Eric Jarrin – guitar
- Ben Landreville – guitar
- Sébastien Piché – bass
- Alex Pelletier – drums
