= The Healing Process =

Studio album by Despised Icon
- Released: April 5, 2005
- Genre: Deathcore
- Length: 32:04
- Label: Century Media
- Producer: Yannick St-Amand

Despised Icon chronology
Consumed by Your Poison (2002)	The Healing Process (2005)	The Ills of Modern Man (2007)

Professional ratings
Review scores
Source	Rating
AllMusic	3.5/5 stars

The Healing Process is the second studio album by Canadian deathcore band Despised Icon. The album was released on April 5, 2005 through Century Media Records.

== Track listing ==
No.	Title	Length
1.	"Bulletproof Scales"	3:20
2.	"Silver Plated Advocate"	3:59
3.	"Immaculate"	4:38
4.	"Warm Blooded"	3:33
5.	"Retina"	3:59
6.	"The Sunset Will Never Charm Us"	3:03
7.	"As Bridges Burn"	3:15
8.	"Harvesting the Deceased"	2:44
9.	"End This Day"	3:33
Total length:		32:04

== Personnel ==
Despised Icon

- Alex Erian – vocals
- Steve Marois – vocals
- Eric Jarrin – guitar
- Yannick St-Amand – guitar
- Sebastien Piché – bass
- Alex Pelletier – drums

Production

- Produced by Yannick St-Amand
