= King Conquer =

American deathcore band

- Origin: Naples, Florida, U.S.
- Genres: Deathcore
- Years active: 2002–2016
- Labels: Mediaskare

King Conquer was an American deathcore band from Naples, Florida. Since the band's inception, they released two EPs independently before being signed to Mediaskare Records where the group released their debut album entitled America's Most Haunted on November 23, 2010. The band's second album, titled 1776, was released on July 16, 2013.

== History ==
=== Beginnings and first EPs (2001–2009) ===
Formed in 2002 by the Whited brothers; Adam and Chris, before being named King Conquer, they were once known as Dark Skies Have Fallen, a metalcore band that released one EP named Conquer in 2005. The band later changed their name to A Horror Story, and a few years later, to King Conquer, along with their genre to a much more death metal inspired sound. King Conquer started playing local shows near their hometown of Naples, Florida, establishing a strong fan-base.

Vocalist Lafe Flynn recorded one EP with King Conquer, Welcome to Hell, before leaving the band. They then were out on search for a new frontman and held auditions throughout the Collier County area until discovering James Mislow. Mislow joining the band, the group then set out to record another EP wherein it was titled Decomposing Normality. The band at that period employed three guitarists.

=== America's Most Haunted (2010–2011) ===
King Conquer's debut full-length album, America's Most Haunted was released on November 23, 2010 after their signing to Mediaskare Records. The group then shortly thereafter began to make a name for themselves. In 2010, they began touring on the No Mercy Tour, with deathcore band Suffokate headlining, promoting their new album. The band toured again with Suffokate during November 2011 along with Blind Witness in the UK.

=== 1776 (second album), break-up, and member deaths (2011–present) ===
King Conquer confirmed plans for their second full-length album during May 2011, which will be titled 1776, originally looking for a release date within 2012 through Mediaskare. However, the album required an extensive mastering procedure and was confirmed in November 2012 that it will instead be released in 2013. The band leaked a song off it titled "Tyranny" in its pre-production state during October 2011.

The band headlined The Shredded to Pieces Tour. with bands including Abiotic (of Metal Blade Records), Forty Winters (of Dead Truth Recordings) and In Reference to a Sinking Ship (now known as Dark Sermon). This was a small week-long tour of Florida starting in Orlando on Sunday, April 15, 2012, and ending Sunday April 22 in Lake Worth at The Speakeasy Lounge.

The band was included on the 2012 Devastation of the Nation Tour with Bermuda, The Last Ten Seconds of Life, In Dying Arms and other special guests. Bassist, Adam Whited, however was unable to be present on this tour due to King Conquer's touring van's air conditioning being currently broken and as a result, the summer heat was too extreme for him to withstand due to his struggles with multiple sclerosis. Whited's position in the band was substituted by 19-year-old Jesse Kirkbride (guitarist of Dealey Plaza) during this tour.

Guitarist John Byrd departed from the band in April 2013 due to a conflict with the members which resulted in him being stranded in Texas. Byrd returned to the band, however, in August of the same year. In September, drummer Chris Whited and vocalist James Mislow both left for unknown reasons, they were replaced by Bryan Long of Dealey Plaza. King Conquer even acquired a third guitarist in the midst of these member replacements, Jesse Kirkbride, also of Dealey Plaza who previously substituted for the band on bass.

The band reissued their EP Decomposing Normality in 2015 with new cover art after a fan held a crowdfunding campaign in order to have the EP reissued. The crowdfund raised over US$4,200. Following this, the EP was re-issued later that same year with new artwork and re-arranged track listing with two of the songs renamed ("Interlude" had its title changed to "Cataclysm" and "The Beginning" had its title changed to "The Immersive Design of Suffering").

King Conquer's final song, "Death Bed", was released onto music streaming services during the summer of 2015. The band would break up the following year.

Previous guitarist John Byrd was found dead on April 9, 2016. It was confirmed that he died due to complications concerning his ongoing addiction, namely a fentanyl overdose. On September 27, 2016, the band released a statement revealing that previous guitarist Brodie Wheeler had also died from substance abuse issues. Founding bassist Adam Whited (who is the brother of founding drummer Chris Whited) died on April 5, 2022, due to complications from his longtime battle with multiple sclerosis.

== Band members ==
=== Final lineup ===
- James Mislow — lead vocals (2009–2013, 2014–2017)
- Derick Caperton — guitar (2012–2017)
- Adam Whited — bass (2001–2017) (died 2022)
- Chris Whited — drums, vocals (2001–2013, 2014–2017)

=== Former members ===
- Brodie Wheeler — guitar (2001–2007) (died 2016)
- Pieter Montoulieu — guitar (2001–2007)
- Lafe Flynn — lead vocals (2001–2007)
- Jared Smith — lead vocals (2007–2009)
- Tony Reid — guitar (2009–2010)
- Ryley Dipaola — drums (2013–2014)
- Bryan Long — lead vocals (2013–2014) (Dealey Plaza)
- David Norton – guitar (2010–2012)
- John Byrd — guitar (2007–2013, 2013–2014) (died 2016)

== Discography ==
=== Albums ===
- America's Most Haunted (2010, Mediaskare)
- 1776 (2013, Mediaskare)

=== EPs ===
- Welcome to Hell (2008, self-released)
- Decomposing Normality (2009, self-released)
