= Purgatory (Despised Icon album) =

Studio album by Despised Icon
- Released: November 15, 2019
- Genre: Deathcore
- Length: 36:10
- Label: Nuclear Blast
- Producer: Yannick St-Amand, Eric Jarrin, Alex Erian

Despised Icon chronology
Beast (2016)	Purgatory (2019)	Shadow Work (2025)

Singles from Purgatory
- 1. "Purgatory" Released: September 6, 2019; 2. "Snake in the Grass" Released: October 11, 2019

Professional ratings
Review scores
Source	Rating
Distorted Sound	9/10
Metal Injection	9/10

Purgatory is the sixth studio album by Despised Icon. The album was released on November 15, 2019. It was produced by former guitarist Yannick St-Amand, similarly to the previous album Beast, though this time with co-lead vocalist Alex Erian and lead guitarist Eric Jarrin, both of whom wrote the album together with drummer Alex "Grind" Pelletier.

On September 20, The band embarked on a massive North American tour to promote "Purgatory" ahead of its release.

== Track listing ==
1. "Dernier Souffle" – 1:49
2. "Purgatory" – 3:47
3. "Light Speed" – 2:33
4. "Slow Burning" – 3:16
5. "Snake in the Grass" – 3:21
6. "Vies D'Anges" – 2:53
7. "Moving On" – 4:51
8. "Unbreakable" – 3:09
9. "Apex Predator" – 3:06
10. "Legacy" – 3:26
11. "Dead Weight" – 3:59

== Personnel ==
- Alex Erian – vocals
- Steve Marois – vocals
- Eric Jarrin – guitar
- Ben Landreville – guitar
- Sébastien Piché – bass guitar
- Alex Pelletier – drums
