= Silent Civilian =

American metal band

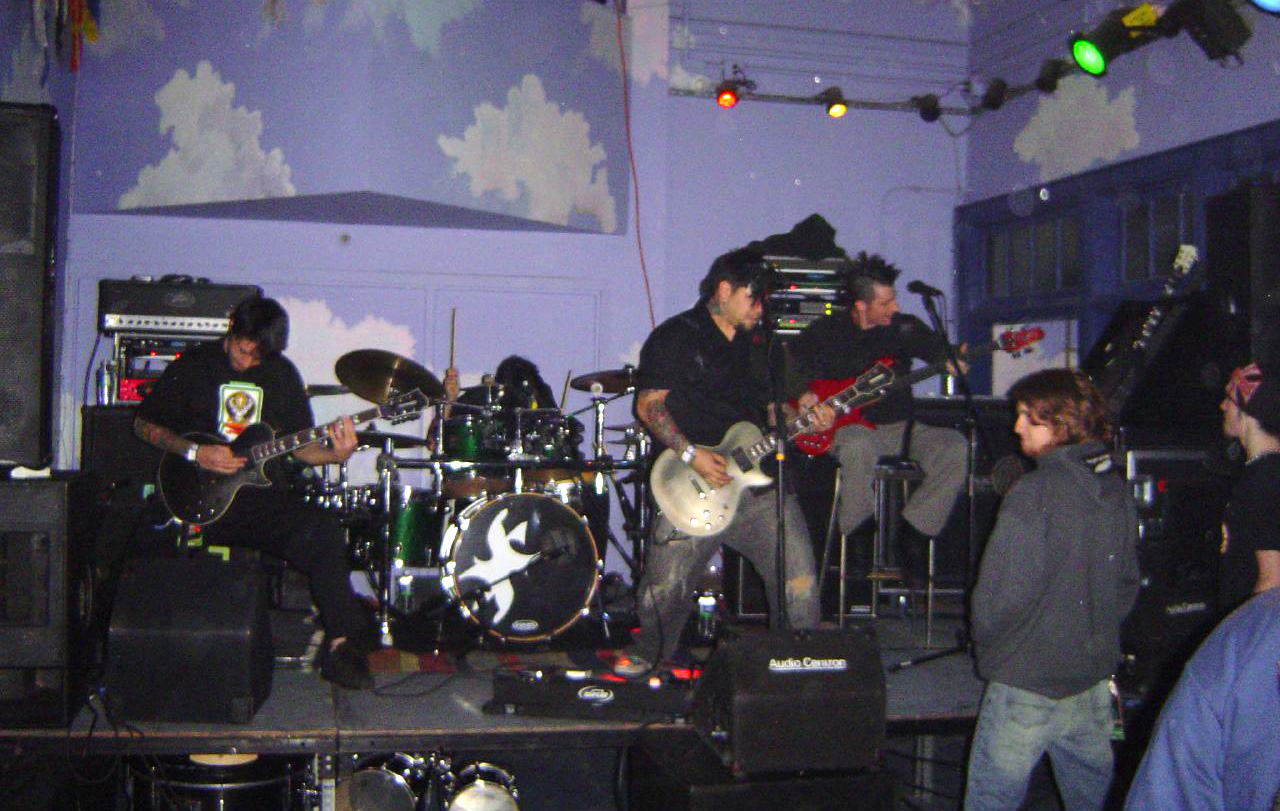
- Silent Civilian performing in 2006

Background information
- Origin: Los Angeles, California, U.S.
- Genres: Metalcore, thrash metal
- Years active: 2005–present (hiatus from 2013–2017, 2020–2023)
- Label: Mediaskare
- Members: Jonny Santos; Matt Bredemeier; Robbie Young; Alex Morgan
- Past members: Chris Mora; Daylen Elsey; Rudy "Fyto" Perez; Tim Mankowski; Ryan Ready; Marcus Rafferty; Henno; Stan Derby; Shaun Feiler; Dave Delacruz; Ryan Halpert

Silent Civilian is an American heavy metal band originating from Los Angeles, California. Following his departure from nu metal band Spineshank in 2004, frontman Jonny Santos felt he wanted to move in a different direction musically and start from scratch. Silent Civilian was thus formed and the band faced trouble from the start after experiencing several line-up changes and departing from their original record label Corporate Punishment Records.

The band signed with Mediaskare Records and released their debut album, Rebirth of the Temple, in 2006. Receiving generally positive reviews, the album has sold more than 25,000 copies since its release in the United States. Their line-up consists of Santos (vocals and guitar), Matt Bredemeier (guitar) and Robbie Young (bass) and Alex Morgan (drums)

Silent Civilian released their second album, Ghost Stories, in 2010. The band has plans to release a third studio album. During the month of December in 2022, Silent Civilian released a YouTube lyric video for “My Addiction,” the band's first new music since 2010. According to a later press release, the song is from the band's upcoming third album “The Reckoning”.

== History ==
=== Formation ===
Jonny Santos, who is best known as the vocalist and songwriter for the Grammy Award nominated industrial metal band Spineshank was displeased with the direction the band was going in and felt it had 'run its course'. Santos felt it was time to move on and left Spineshank, although he was unsure what direction he wanted with his music career. He would play with local bands and friends, while performing production and engineering duties in studios to 'pay the bills'. However, after leaving Spineshank, Santos lost everything and was basically homeless, 'couch surfing' from friend's house to friend's house.

Realizing he wanted to start a band from scratch, Santos placed an ad for a drummer on the social networking website MySpace. After receiving a large number of e-mails, Santos received an e-mail from Chris Mora with a video of him drumming. Santos thought "You can't be for real, dude" and asked Mora to come down for the first audition. 10 minutes into the audition Mora was hired as the drummer. Santos auditioned for an Australian band that moved to America called Cryogenic. Although he thought the band was not for him, he met the band's bassist Henno. As Cryogenic and Mudrock, who were working together, had both lost their vocalists, Henno contacted Santos and asked him to join the band, to which Santos accepted. Ryan Ready, who Santos had known since high-school, was recruited as the second guitarist. The band's original name was announced as Silent Civilians, which originates from the world's climate change by that people have opinions on life and politics and they do not voice their beliefs, living in a nation full of 'silent civilians'.

=== Label and line-up changes ===
Silent Civilians signed to Corporate Punishment Records in January 2005 and began work on their debut album, Rebirth of the Temple. However, in May Santos announced they left CPR for reasons he was unable to discuss. The band began talking to several labels after this and pushed the release of their debut to late 2005 or early 2006. The album was recorded at Undercity Recordings, with production duties handled by former Machine Head and Soulfly guitarist Logan Mader, and co-production handled by his partner, Lucas Banker. The band also announced they had changed their name to Silent Civilian. In June, guitarist Ryan Ready left the band for personal reasons, not relating to the band. Santos sought a replacement, and the following day to Ready's departure set up auditions. Tim Mankowski, who Santos had known for 15 years and played in the band Basic Enigma with him, was hired as the new guitarist.

In November 2005, the band signed with Mediaskare Records and planned a tentative release for their debut album for February 21, 2006. At this time, the band had three demo versions of the songs "Lies in the House of Shame", "Divided" and the title track, "Rebirth of the Temple". Mora and Santos were involved in the writing process of the album. While Mora was at work, Santos was at home writing riffs and would create roughly three to four 'skeletons of songs' a week. When Mora finished work, he would help Santos with arrangements, the body of the song, and track it that night and record the vocals and melodies the following day. 30 songs were primarily written for the album as Santos wanted fans to get their money's worth. 16 songs were recorded that included two cover versions of the thrash metal band Slayer's "War Ensemble” and Death Angel's "Seemingly Endless Time". Although neither cover songs made it onto the album. The length of the CD is 64 minutes, which features the video of the album's title track, and an exclusive 10-minute documentary on the creation process of the album.

=== Rebirth of the Temple (2006–2007) ===
Silent Civilian released their debut album Rebirth of the Temple on May 2, 2006. Blabbermouth.net reviewer Scott Alisoglu thought "on virtually every track, the group meshes attacking riffs, searing solos, brutal drumming, and melody-drenched bombast". Although he did not believe it was a 'grand slam', he thought it was a "pleasant surprise and strong first effort". Charlie Steffens of KNAC described the album as "goddamn electric", while Greg Maki of live-metal.net awarded the album a perfect 10 out of 10 selecting it as his "best album I have heard so far in 2006." As of June 5, 2007, Rebirth of the Temple has sold 25,000 copies.

The video for the first single, "Rebirth of the Temple", was directed by Scott Culver and was filmed at Santos' childhood home. Santos invited 50 friends over for a party and posted a bulletin that read "If you're in the L.A. area, if you're a Silent Civilian fan, show up at this address" two hours before filming. This resulted in another 30 people turning up. Static-X front-man Wayne Static, Stone Sour drummer Roy Mayorga and Logan make appearances in the video.

Tim Mankowski departed the band and Henno broke his ankle on an on-stage mishap. The band continued to tour as a three-piece as they sought for a replacement guitarist and bassist as soon as possible — Henno was able to perform on a bar stool temporarily. While touring with Nothingface and Crossbreed, Santos had met guitarist Marcus Rafferty, who he became friends with and recruited him to replace Mankowski after an audition. Touring partners Bleed the Sky assisted in replacing members for live shows. Bassist Disco Daylen took to the stage replacing Henno and guitarist Kyle Moorman assisted with the replacement of the guitarist by playing half the set and Rafferty would play the other. Santos asked Rafferty if he knew any bass players who were interested in a position, he contacted a friend of his, Stan Derby, who replaced Disco after one month.

In a July 2006 interview with Live-Metal.net, Santos stated the band was planning on recording a tribute EP of cover versions on old Bay Area music, including such bands as Sacred Reich, Death Angel, Exodus and Testament. The band is touring on The Sweet Revenge Tour with Kittie, It Dies Today and Bring Me the Horizon and by the end of the year Santos hopes to establish the band as a headlining act. On December 28, 2007, in a statement released to Blabbermouth.net, Mora explained his departure from the band was based on personal reasons.

=== Ghost Stories (2008–present) ===
As of November 12, 2008, their official Myspace page confirmed that they are currently writing a new record. In March 2009, their Myspace page stated that the new record will be called Ghost Stories. On June 11, 2010, the band's Myspace was updated with a new song titled "Ghost Stories" which would be featured on the upcoming album. Ryan Halpert ignited the band as Chris Mora's replacement on drums in mid-2009. Their sophomore album Ghost Stories was released via Mediaskare Records on May 18, 2010. In 2013, bassist Robbie Young launched his new project Atlas.

The band has plans to release a third studio album. As of December 2017, no new material has been released.

In 2018, Silent Civilian launched a crowdfunding campaign to raise money for the production of a third album, with a goal of US$20,000. As of January 2020, they had only raised $5,435 but claim to still be making the album regardless. In 2019, the band launched an online store, but it has since shut down for unknown reasons.

On January 20, 2023, Silent Civilian released "De La Muerte", a new song from their upcoming third album, due to be released via Black Horse Entertainment. The band had previously released "My Addiction" the month prior.

== Members ==
- Jonny Santos – lead vocals, guitar (2005–present)
- Robbie Young – bass (2009–present)
- Matt Bredemeier – guitar, backing vocals (2011–2013, 2023–present)
- Alex Morgan – drums (2023–present)

=== Former members ===
- Ryan Ready – guitar (2005)
- Daylen Elsen – bass (2006–2007)
- Tim Mankowski – guitar (2005–2006, recorded Rebirth of the Temple)
- Henno – bass (2005–2006, recorded Rebirth of the Temple)
- Chris "Mad Man" Mora – drums (2005–2007, recorded Rebirth of the Temple)
- Shaun Feiler - bass, backing vocals (2008-2009)
- Dave Delacruz – guitar (2008–2010, 2017–2020)
- Ryan Halpert – drums (2009–2010, recorded Ghost Stories)
- Zac Morris – drums (2012)

== Discography ==
=== Studio albums ===
| Year | Album details | Peak chart positions | | | | | | Sales & Certifications |
| Year | Album details | US | AUS | CAN | GER | NZ | UK | Sales & Certifications |
|---|---|---|---|---|---|---|---|---|
| 2006 | Rebirth of the Temple: Released: May 2, 2006; Label: Mediaskare | — | — | — | — | 75 | — | US Sales: 25,000+; US Cert: |
| 2010 | Ghost Stories: Released: May 18, 2010; Label: Mediaskare | — | — | — | — | — | — | |

=== Singles ===
| Year | Title | Peak chart positions | | | | | | | Album |
| Year | Title | US | Main Rock | AUS | CAN | GER | NZ | UK | Album |
|---|---|---|---|---|---|---|---|---|---|
| 2006 | "Rebirth of the Temple" | — | 38 | — | — | — | — | — | Rebirth of the Temple |
| 2006 | "The Song Remains Un-Named" | — | — | — | — | — | — | — | Rebirth of the Temple |
| 2007 | "Live Again" | — | 16 | — | 104 | — | — | 73 | Rebirth of the Temple |
| 2010 | "Last One Standing" | — | — | — | — | — | — | — | Ghost Stories |
