= Homeland Insecurity (Endwell album) =

Studio album by Endwell
- Released: October 31, 2006
- Genre: Metalcore, post-hardcore
- Length: 41:21
- Label: Victory
- Producer: Jay Baumgardner; Mark Renk

Endwell chronology
The Missing Pieces (2005)	Homeland Insecurity (2006)	Revenge Is a Healthy Motive (2008)

Professional ratings
Review scores
Source	Rating
AllMusic	2.5/5 stars
Punk News	0.5/5 stars

Homeland Insecurity is the debut album by Endwell. It was released on October 31, 2006, on Victory Records.

== Track listing ==
All tracks are written by Endwell (Sean Murphy, Danny Pupplo, Dan Puglisi, Steve Muskopf, and Mike Kaabe), except where noted.

No.	Title	Writer(s)	Length
1.	"The End"		3:35
2.	"A Taste of Everest"		3:21
3.	"Single and Loving It"		3:53
4.	"Four Letter Words"		3:35
5.	"Homeland Insecurity"		3:38
6.	"Goodbyes Are Always Coldest in December"		2:06
7.	"Boy Meets World War III"		3:34
8.	"I'm Frozen and You're Dead"		3:45
9.	"Drowning (One Last Breath)"	Chris Farmosa, Pupplo, Puglisi, Muskopf, Kaabe	3:38
10.	"Whine and Dine"	Farmosa, Pupplo, Puglisi, Steven Dicasa, Kaabe	2:31
11.	"Fever White"		3:56
12.	"Zombies Never Think Twice"		3:49

== Personnel ==
Endwell

- Sean Murphy – lead vocals
- Danny Pupplo – guitar
- Dan Puglisi – guitar
- Steve Muskopf – bass
- Mike Kaabe – drums, vocals

Production

- Jay Baumgardner – producer
- Mark Renk – additional vocal production
- Sergio Chavez – engineer
- Casey Lewis – additional engineering
- Dave Colvin – additional engineering
- U. E. Nastasi – mastering
- Mike "Sak" Fasano – drum technician

Layout

- Double J – art direction, layout
- Christopher K. George – photography
- Matt Wysocki – additional photography
- Susan Finkbeiner – cover model
