= Stand Your Ground (band) =

American hardcore band

- Origin: Kingsport, Tennessee
- Genres: Christian hardcore, hardcore punk, melodic hardcore
- Years active: 2007–present
- Labels: Rite of Passage
- Members: Brandi Pillow; Micah Messamore; Daniel Taylor; Jonathan Taylor; Tyler Domingues
- Website: facebook.com/standyourgroundofficial

Stand Your Ground is an American hardcore band, and they primarily play a version of hardcore punk, with a more melodic hardcore style. They come from Kingsport, Tennessee. The band started making music in 2007. Their first studio album, Despondeseas, was released by Rite of Passage Music, in 2011.

== Background ==
Stand Your Ground is a Christian hardcore band from Kingsport, Tennessee, where they formed in 2007, while they play a melodic hardcore style of music. Their members are lead vocalist, Brandi Pillow, guitarists, Micah Messamore and Daniel Taylor, bassist, Jonathan Taylor, and drummer, Tyler Domingues.

== Music history ==
The band commenced as a musical entity in 2007, with their first studio album, Despondeseas, being released on August 30, 2011, by Rite of Passage music.

On October 11, 2012, Stand Your Ground released the single "Betrayer/Deceiver", accompanied by a video directed by Jordan Scott of Clockwork Designs. On June 25, 2013, the band released their sophomore EP Standards. In July 2013, they embarked on the Cross The Horizons Tour across Canada, with support from Once In A Lifetime, Behold The City, and Of Concepts And Kings. During the tour, the band filmed the official music video for their track "The Fearless".

== Members ==
Current members

- Brandi Pillow - vocals
- Micah Messamore - guitar
- Daniel Taylor - guitar
- Jonathan Taylor - bass
- Tyler Domingues - drums

== Discography ==
Studio albums

- Despondeseas (August 30, 2011, Rite of Passage)

EPs

- Standards (June 25, 2013, Independent)
