= The Ills of Modern Man =

Studio album by Despised Icon
- Released: May 22, 2007
- Recorded: January–February 2007
- Studio: Projecson Recording Studio, Rouyn-Noranda, Quebec, Canada
- Genre: Deathcore
- Length: 39:51
- Label: Century Media
- Producer: Yannick St-Amand

Despised Icon chronology
| The Healing Process (2005) | The Ills of Modern Man (2007) | Montreal Assault (2009) |

The Ills of Modern Man is the third studio album by Canadian deathcore band Despised Icon. It was released on May 22, 2007 through Century Media Records. The album sold more than 2,000 copies its first week, and peaked at number 28 on the Billboard Top Heatseekers.

In 2021, Joe Smith-Engelhardt of Alternative Press included the album in his list of "30 deathcore albums from the 2000s that define the genre".

== History ==
The Ills of Modern Man was recorded between January and February 2007. It was by produced by the band's former guitarist, Yannick St-Amand and was mixed by Andy Sneap at his own Backstage Studios in Derbyshire, England. The album artwork was made by Felix Rancourt. The first music video from the album was made for the song, "In the Arms of Perdition", it was directed by Jean-Philippe Bernier and was filmed at -40 °C on a secluded icy mountain near Quebec City.

== Musical and lyrical themes ==
In an interview for the magazine Exclaim!, vocalist, Alexandre Erian stated that the main lyrical themes of The Ills of Modern Man mainly concern regrets, fears, inhibitions and dealing with disappointment.

== Critical reception ==
Professional ratings
Review scores
| Source | Rating |
|---|---|
| About.com | 4/5 stars |
| AllMusic | 3/5 stars |
| Blabbermouth.net | 8/10 stars |

During the week The Ills of Modern Man was released, it sold more than 2,000 copies, which lead it to reach number 28 on the Billboard Top Heatseekers.

The album generally received positive reviews, Alex Henderson of AllMusic described the band's sound as an "example of technical death metal and technical metalcore coming together" and which "they have achieved a balance of accessibility and angularity". About.com reviewer Chad Bowar praised the album saying, "The Ills of Modern Man is technical, brutal, and most important, memorable."

== Track listing ==
| No. | Title | Length |
|---|---|---|
| 1. | "In the Arms of Perdition" | 4:24 |
| 2. | "Furtive Monologue" | 3:22 |
| 3. | "Quarantine" | 4:07 |
| 4. | "The Ills of Modern Man" | 3:50 |
| 5. | "A Fractured Hand" | 4:35 |
| 6. | "Sheltered Reminiscence" | 3:13 |
| 7. | "Nameless" | 3:02 |
| 8. | "Tears of the Blameless" | 4:13 |
| 9. | "Oval Shaped Incisions" | 4:02 |
| 10. | "Fainted Blue Ornaments" | 5:03 |
| Total length: | | 39:51 |

== Personnel ==
Despised Icon

- Alex Erian – vocals
- Steve Marois – vocals
- Eric Jarrin – guitar
- Al Glassman – guitar
- Sebastien Piché – bass
- Alex Pelletier – drums

Production

- Produced and engineered by Yannick St-Amand
- Mastered and mixed by Andy Sneap
- Artwork by Felix Rancourt
