= Exotic Animal Petting Zoo =

American experimental mathcore band

- Origin: United States
- Genres: Mathcore, post-hardcore, progressive metal, alternative metal
- Years active: 2004 - 2017
- Label: Mediaskare
- Members: Brandon Carr; Stephen Carr; Scott Certa
- Past members: Steve Radakovich; Jeffrey Zampillo
- Website: http://www.facebook.com/eapzmusic

Exotic Animal Petting Zoo was an experimental mathcore quartet based in Crown Point, Indiana. They released their debut album, I Have Made My Bed In Darkness, on Mediaskare records. Their second album, Tree Of Tongues, was released August 5, 2012. They have toured with acts such as Fear Before and Dead Letter Circus.

== History ==
Exotic Animal Petting Zoo formed in 2004. Shortly after their conception, they released a 5-song demo. In 2005, the band recruited Scott Certa, as their permanent bassist, which led to the recording of their first EP. Soon after the release of their EP, they got signed by Mediaskare Records. Their debut album, I Have Made My Bed In Darkness, was released in August 2008. Their second album, Tree of Tongues, was released in 2012. Later that year, guitarist Jeffrey Zampillo left the band. Following the release of the album and touring in 2012 and 2013, the band mostly went quiet, only to perform a limited number of shows in 2017. Their disbandment was confirmed in 2024 with the Carr brothers announcing their new project, Spy Balloon. Their debut album was released on July 18, 2025.

== Members ==
=== Final lineup ===
- Brandon Carr – guitars, vocals (2004–2017)
- Stephen Carr – drums, samples, vocals (2004–2017)
- Scott Certa – bass (2005–2017)

=== Former members ===
- Steve Radakovich – guitar (2008–2010)
- Jeffrey Zampillo – guitar (2010–2012)

== Discography ==
- I Have Made My Bed In Darkness (2008)
- Tree Of Tongues (2012)
