= Blind Witness =

Canadian Metalcore band

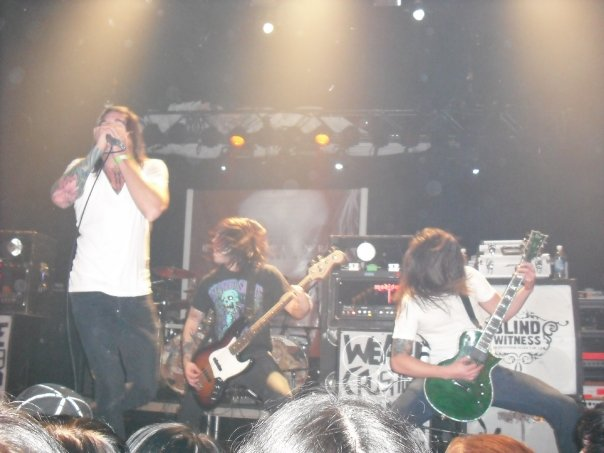
- Blind Witness performing live in 2009

Background information
- Origin: Granby, Quebec, Canada
- Genres: Deathcore, metalcore
- Years active: 2005–2012, 2014–present
- Labels: Torque, Mediaskare
- Members: Jonathan Cabana; Maxime Lacroix; Olivier Roy; David Duhamel; Sébastien Lalonde-Ricordi
- Past members: Samuel Langlois; Maxime Desroches; Kevin Desroches; Sonny Tremblay; Tim Burak; Pier-Luc Desroches; Mathieu Paquette; Miguel Lepage; Jon Campbell; Nicolas Doiron; Eric Morotti; Tommy Henderson; Patrick Woods; Francis Beaupre; Nicolas Cazzaro

Blind Witness is a Canadian deathcore band from Granby, Quebec. Formed in 2005, the group was signed to Mediaskare Records and released two full-length studio albums. The band broke up in 2012, but reformed in 2014.

== History ==
Blind Witness was founded in 2005, by vocalist Jonathan Cabana in Granby, Quebec along with friends guitarist Pier-Luc Desroches and drummer Kevin Desroches. They later added guitarist/vocalist Maxime Lacroix and bassist Miguel Lepage to the roster. In 2005, the band began performing in Montreal. In 2005, the band began performing in Montreal.

In 2007, the band was signed by Victory/Torque Records. Then in 2008, the band released their first full-length album: Silences Are Words.

While writing their follow up album, the group signed to Mediaskare Records and entered the studio to record Nightmare on Providence Street. Released in 2010, the album was met with positive reviews, with Absolute Punk scoring it 84 percent and the reviewer stating that "metal core is one of the most hated genre's of metal. I believe that Blind Witness can prove that wrong to a lot of different metal fans."

In September 2011 it was announced that John Campbell, Maxime Lacroix, Miguel Lepage and Eric Morotti left the band. A few days later Campbell posted, "The band is not broken up. Myself, Miguel, Max and Eric have quit. The band could very well continue with a new line-up. I'm sure something will be posted soon in regards to the continuation of the band, but for now, 4 of the 5 members have quit, and that's that." Cabana wrote, "I'll keep everyone posted soon! We toured a lot and need some time home! I started this band in my basement. I changed a LOT of members through the time! Me and Max are they only original members; Max doesn't want to tour anymore but he still wants to write the new record! Only the people who play live will change, not the music!" A few months later Eric Morotti rejoined the band, along with new guitarist, Olivier Roy, and bassist Francis Beaupré. Lacroix played his last show with the band in October but continued to write and record the band's next record. Nicolas Doiron took the place as the second guitar player for the band.

On February 10, 2012, the band confirmed that they were going into the studio to record their next album in May. On May 25, 2012, they announced their break up. They played their last show in Montreal, Quebec, Canada on August 12 at the Heavy Montréal 2012 festival.

In 2014, the band reformed and confirmed that they would be recording and releasing their next album I Am Hell. In June 2015, the band released a five-song EP of that name.

== Band members ==
Current

- Jonathan Cabana – lead vocals (2005–2012, 2014–present)
- Maxime Lacroix – lead guitar, backing vocals (2005–2011, 2014–present), studio songwriting (2010-2012)
- Olivier Roy – rhythm guitar (2014–present), lead guitar (2011–2012)
- David Duhamel – bass (2024–present)
- Sébastien Lalonde-Ricordi – drums (2024–present)

Former

- Samuel Langlois – guitar (2005)
- Maxime Desroches – bass (2005)
- Kevin Desroches – drums (2005–2008)
- Nicolas Cazzaro – bass (2006–2007)
- Sonny Tremblay – drums (2008)
- Tim Burak – drums (2008)
- Pier-Luc Desroches – guitar (2005–2009)
- Mathieu Paquette – guitar (2009, died in 2011)
- Miguel Lepage – bass (2007–2011)
- John Campbell – guitar (2009–2011)
- Nicolas Doiron – guitar (2011-2012)
- Eric Morotti – drums (2009–2012, 2014–2019)
- Tommy Henderson – drums (2019–2020)
- Patrick Woods – drums (2020)
- Francis Beaupré – bass (2011–2020)

Timeline

== Discography ==
Studio albums

- Silences Are Words (Torque Records, 2008)
- Nightmare on Providence Street (Mediaskare, 2010)

EPs

- Means/Blind Witness - Split EP (Torque Records, 2007)
- I Am Hell (independent, 2015)

Videography

- Confessions (2006)
- Bleeding Blades (2007)
- Baby One More Notch (2009)
- I Am Hell (2015)
- Force Fed (2020)
