= Mediaskare Records =

American record label

- Founded: 2005
- Founder: Baron Bodnar
- Distributor: RED Distribution
- Genre: Heavy metal, extreme metal, post-hardcore, hardcore punk
- Location: Los Angeles, California, U.S.

Mediaskare Records was an American independent record label specializing in heavy metal music. It was founded by Baron Bodnar, with its offices located in Los Angeles, California. The label's prominent artists included Volumes, Bury Your Dead, and Silent Civilian.

In February 2008, it was announced that Mediaskare entered a partnership with Century Media Records. The deal centered on new marketing and distribution for Mediaskare artists. In late 2010, the label broke apart from Century Media for distribution and joined Suburban Noize/RED.

== Artist list ==
- Bermuda
- Deserters
- Endwell
- Exotic Animal Petting Zoo
- Hero in Error
- Murder Death Kill
- Mureau
- Polarization
- The Prestige
- Red Enemy
- Reformers
- Reign Supreme
- Runaway Kids (formerly known as Betrayal)
- Silent Civilian
- Ugly Colors

=== Rite of Passage Records artists ===
- Aristeia
- Adaliah
- Darasuum
- Truth & Its Burden
- Wrath of Vesuvius

== Former Mediaskare bands ==
- The Ability (disbanded)
- Adaliah (disbanded 2018)
- Ambush!
- Antagonist A.D. (active, unsigned)
- As Blood Runs Black
- A Breath Before Surfacing (On Hiatus)
- Belay My Last (Disbanded 2008)
- Betrayal (now known as Runaway Kids)
- Blind Witness (Active on Hell For Breakfast)
- Blood Stands Still
- Burning The Masses (On Hiatus)
- Bury Your Dead (Active on Stay Sick Recordings)
- Contra (Disbanded 2007)
- Creations (active)
- The Demonstration (Active)
- The Ghost Inside (Active on Epitaph Records)
- Hundredth (Active, unsigned)
- It Prevails (Active on Stay Sick Recordings)
- King Conquer (active, unsigned)
- The Last of Our Kind (Disbanded 2012; never released album with Mediaskare)
- Lionheart
- Lose None (On Hiatus)
- Martyrdom (Disbanded 2010)
- The Messenger (Disbanded)
- The Miles Between (Disbanded)
- The Prestige (Disbanded)
- Truth & Its Burden (Active, unsigned)
- Redeemer (Disbanded 2015)
- The Red Shore (Disbanded 2011)
- The Sheds (disbanded 2015)
- Sovereign Strength (Disbanded 2012)
- Stand Your Ground (Active, Unsigned)
- Suffokate (active, unsigned)
- Volumes (active on Fearless Records)
- With Dead Hands Rising (Disbanded 2009)
- A Heartwell Ending (now known as Call The Cops)
