= List of guitar tunings =

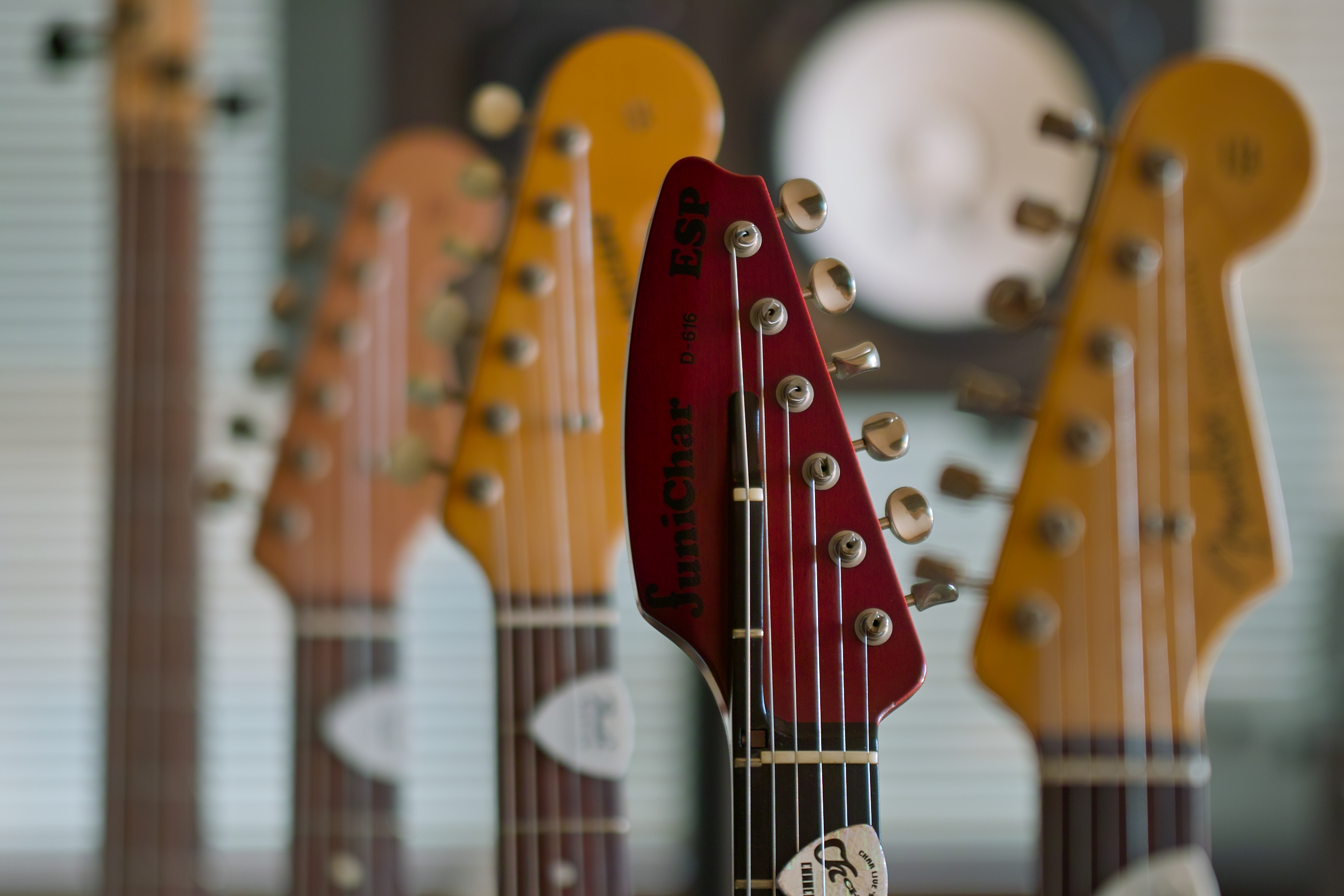
A FuniChar D-616 guitar with a Drop D tuning. It has an unusual additional fretboard that extends onto the headstock. Most guitarists obtain a Drop D tuning by detuning the low E string a tone down.

This article contains a list of guitar tunings that supplements the article guitar tunings. In particular, this list contains more examples of open and regular tunings, which are discussed in the article on guitar tunings. In addition, this list also notes dropped tunings.

== Standard tuning ==
E-A-d-g-b-e'

Throughout, this list references standard tuning, i.e. E_{2}–A_{2}–D_{3}–G_{3}–B_{3}–E_{4} . for comparison.

== Open ==
=== Major ===
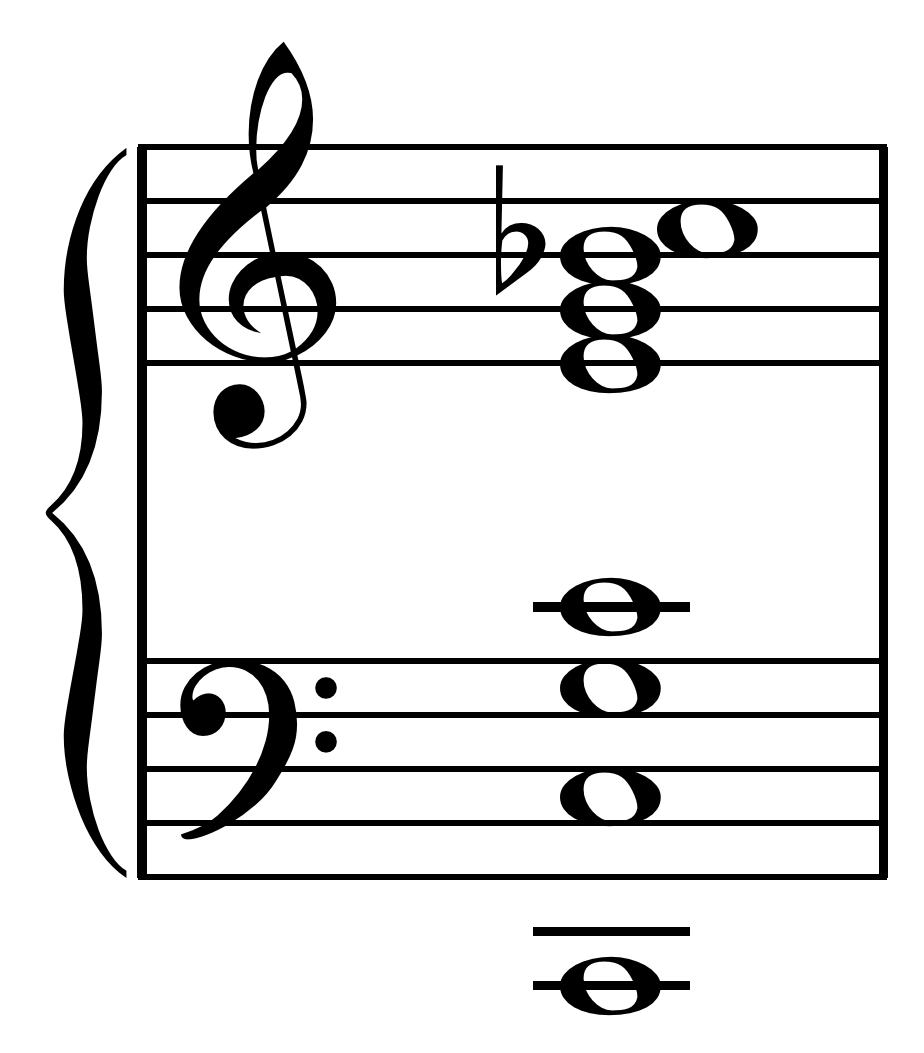
Initial eight harmonics on C, namely (C,C,G,C,E,G,B♭,C) (played simultaneously)

Major open-tunings give a major chord with the open strings.

==== Open A ====
E-A-C♯-E-A-E

- Alternatively: A-E-A-E-A-C♯ (one step down from "Open B")
- "Slide" Open A: E-A-E-A-C♯-E (identical to "Open G" tuning but with every string raised one step or two frets) Used by Jimmy Page on "In My Time of Dying" and Jack White on "Seven Nation Army" and "Catch Hell Blues"".
- Alternatively: D-A-E-A-C#-E (E-A-E-A-C#-E but low E is tuned a full step down) Used by various bands such as Algernon Cadwallader, Tiny Moving Parts, and Merchant Ships.

→

==== Open B ====
B-F♯-B-F♯-B-D♯

- Alternatively: F♯-B-D♯-F♯-B-D♯

Used by Nickelback on "Should've Listened" and Big Wreck on "Albatross".

==== Open C ====
C-G-C-G-C-E

This open C tuning is used by William Ackerman for his "Townsend Shuffle" and by John Fahey for his tribute to Mississippi John Hurt. This tuning is also commonly used by John Butler on his 12-string guitar. This tuning is used on most work by Devin Townsend in his solo work as well as his work with Strapping Young Lad. When playing on a 7-string guitar, he would have a low G as the lowest string to complete the fifth. David Wilcox also recorded his most songs, "Eye of the Hurricane" and "Rusty Old American Dream", both from How Did You Find Me Here, in this tuning, as well as "New World", "Show the Way", "Hold It Up to the Light", and his cover of "It's the Same Old Song" from Big Horizon, and "Mango" from East Asheville Hardware.

C-E-G-C-E-G

The English guitar used a repetitive open-C tuning that approximated a major-thirds tuning.

C-C-G-C-E-G

This open-C tuning gives the initial harmonic series when a C-string is struck. The C-C-G-C-E-G tuning uses the harmonic sequence (overtones) of the note C. When an open-note C-string is struck, its harmonic sequence begins with the notes (C,C,G,C,E,G,B♭,C). This overtone-series tuning was modified by Mick Ralphs, who used a high C rather than the high G for "Can't Get Enough" on Bad Company. Ralphs said, "It needs the open C to have that ring," and "it never really sounds right in standard tuning".

==== Open D ====
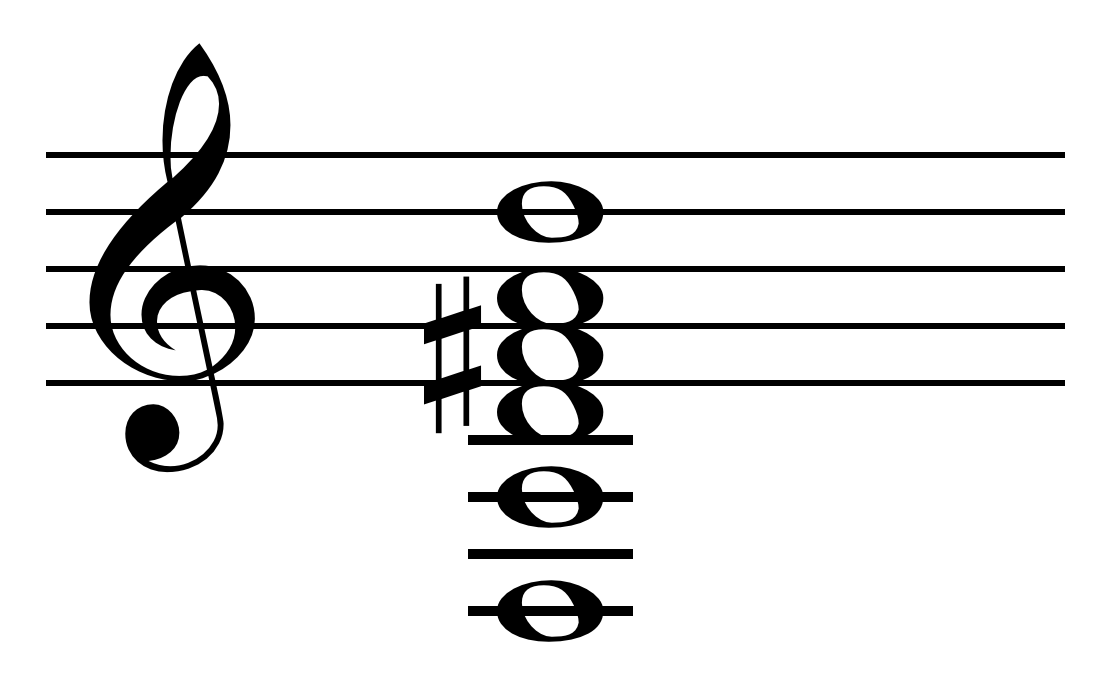
Open D tuning.

Open D tuning (listen)

D-A-D-F♯-A-D

Open-D tuning is used by Joni Mitchell for her "Big Yellow Taxi", Nick Drake for "Place To Be", Alt-J for "Interlude 2", Boys Like Girls for "Thunder", Adrianne Lenker for "anything", Harry Styles for Matilda, David Wilcox for "Wildberry Pie", "Mighty Ocean", "Kindness", and "Never Enough", and by Soko for "No More Home, No More Love". Open-D tuning has been called Vestapol tuning.

Kevin Cronin used Open D in "Time for Me to Fly", the 1978 REO Speedwagon song, with four top-string variations for G and A.

- Alternatively: D-A-D'-A'-D-D

This alternative Open D tuning was used by Keith Richards on "Jumpin' Jack Flash" and the Stone Roses in "Love Spreads".

C♯-G♯-C♯-F-G♯-C♯

This tuning is the same as Open D but tuned a half-step down, also known as Open C♯ Major tuning. It is used by Alice In Chains on the songs "Over Now", "Nothin' Song", and "Shame in You"; by Guns N' Roses on the song "Bad Obsession" and its cover of "Jumpin' Jack Flash"; and by Switchfoot on the song "Daisy".

==== Open E ====
E-B-E-G♯-B-E (use light-gauge strings because three strings must be raised) Open E is used by: Brian Jones on "No Expectations", "I Wanna Be Your Man"; Keith Richards on "Salt of the Earth", "Prodigal Son", "Gimme Shelter", "Jigsaw Puzzle", "Jumpin' Jack Flash", "You Can't Always Get What You Want" and by Bob Dylan on his 1975 album Blood on the Tracks. The tuning is also used by Hoobastank on their first and second albums, by Judy Collins on her cover of "Both Sides Now", and by Junior Campbell on the Marmalade recordings "Reflections of My Life" and "I See the Rain". Lastly, the Open E tuning is used by Johnny Marr of the Smiths on "The Headmaster Ritual" and Rush in "Headlong Flight".

A variant, E-G#-B-E-B-E does not need lighter strings because three strings are dropped.

==== Open F ====
F-A-C-F-C-F (requires light-gauge strings)

- Alternatively (without light-gauge strings): C-F-C-F-A-C

C-F-C-F-A-C is the more common of the two. Used by

Elizabeth Cotten on her song "When I Get Home"
Led Zeppelin on "When the Levee Breaks" and "Bron-Yr-Aur Stomp" (studio)

- F-Sharp Tuning: F♯-A♯-C♯-F♯-C♯-F♯
- Alternative: C♯-F♯-C♯-F♯-A♯-C♯

F-F-C-F-A-C is also used by Dave Mason on "Only You Know and I Know"

==== FACGCE / Math Rock Tuning ====
F-A-C-G-C-E is also used, most famously by American Football (band). Periphery uses this tuning one and a half step down (D-F#-A-E-A-C#) on the song "Wax Wings".

==== Open G ====
Open G tuning (listen)

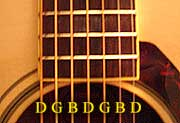
The Russian guitar's tuning approximates a major-thirds tuning.

D-G-D-G-B-D (also known as Spanish Tuning or Chicago Tuning)

Open G was used in rock by Jimmy Page of Led Zeppelin in the songs "Dancing Days", "That's The Way" and "Black Country Woman", Keith Richards of the Rolling Stones as well as in Mississippi blues by Son House, Charley Patton, and Robert Johnson, some songs by Alter Bridge (including down-tuned and minor variations on "In Loving Memory", "Watch Over You", "Wonderful Life", "Words Darker Than Their Wings", "Cradle to the Grave", and "Dying Light"), and in "Fearless" by Pink Floyd. David Wilcox used this tuning on "The Nightshift Watchman".

G-G-D-G-B-D

Listing the initial six harmonics of the G note, this open-G tuning was used by Joni Mitchell for "Electricity", "For the Roses", and "Hunter (The Good Samaritan)". It was also used by Mick Ralphs for "Hey Hey" on Bad Company's debut album. and on the Meowtain song "Alleyway" Stone Gossard also used this tuning in the song "Daughter" by Pearl Jam.

- Alternatively: G-B-D-G-B-D (slack-key guitar)
- Alternatively: C-G-D-G-B-D (used by Big Wreck on multiple songs, most notably "Inhale" and "Mistake"—They downtune it a half step—and by David Wilcox on "It's Almost Time", "Just a Vehicle", "Distant Water", "Golden Day", and his covers of "The Kid" and "Missing You". Also used by Andrew Peterson on his song "Faith to be Strong"
- Dobro Open G: G-B-D-G-B-D (occasionally adopted for ordinary guitar, but requires lighter fifth and sixth strings).
- Russian-guitar Open G: The tuning of the Russian guitar

D-G-B-D-G-B-D

is an open G tuning, approximately in major thirds.

=== Minor: Cross-note ===
The following open-tunings use a minor third, and give a minor chord with open strings. To avoid the relatively cumbersome designation "open D minor", "open C minor", such tunings are sometimes called "cross-note tunings". The term also expresses the fact that, compared to Major chord open tunings, by fretting the lowered string at the first fret, it is possible to produce a major chord very easily.

Cross-note or open E-minor was used by Bukka White and Skip James.

Cross-note tunings include (low to high):

- Cross-note A: E-A-E-A-C-E
  - Alternative: E-A-C-E-A-E
- Cross-note C: C-G-C-G-C-E♭
  - C-C-G-C-E♭-G, a cross-note overtones tuning
  - C-C-G-C-E♭-A♭ a cross-note overtones tuning that facilitates seventh chords.
- Cross-note D: D-A-D-F-A-D (used by John Fahey on the song "Red Pony")
  - Alternative: D-A-D-A-D-F (used by William Ackerman on "Barbara's Song")
- Cross-note E: E-B-E-G-B-E (used by ZZ Top on the song "Just Got Paid" and by Joey Eppard on the 3 song "Bramfatura")
- Cross-note F: F-A♭-C-F-C-F (extremely rare)
  - Alternative: F-C-F-A♭-C-F (used by Albert Collins; requires light gauges)
- Cross-note G: D-G-D-G-B♭-D

Sitar A tuning (listen)

- Alternative Cross A: E-A-E-A-E-A. «Sitar A» - an alternative low guitar system. Recalls the sound of Indian sitar.

=== Modal ===
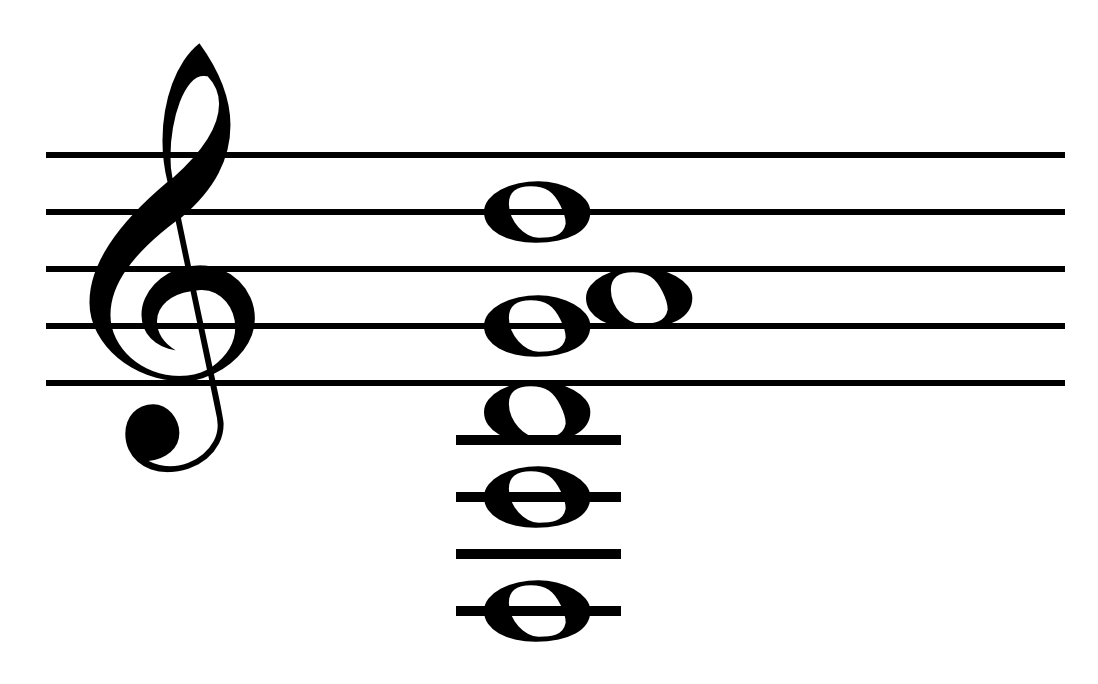
D modal tuning.

In modal tunings, the strings are tuned to form a chord which is not definitively minor or major. These tunings may facilitate very easy chords and unique sounds when the open strings are used as drones. Often these tunings form a suspended chord on the open strings. A well known user of modal tunings is Sonic Youth.

- Asus2: E-A-B-E-A-E
- Asus4: E-A-D-E-A-E (used by Davey Graham in "Lord Mayo/Lord Inchiquin" on The Complete Guitarist)
- B♭ modal: B♭-F-B♭-E♭-G-B♭ (used by Neil Young on his 1962 Martin D-28)
- Bsus4: B-F♯-B-E-F♯-B (DADGAD but three notes (1-1/2 steps) lower, a main tuning of Sevendust, who have used it since Animosity)
- Badd9: B-F♯-C♯-F♯-B-D♯, Used by Devin Townsend on "Bastard", a minor variation is used by Alter Bridge on the song "This Side of Fate" tuned B-F♯-C♯-F♯-B-D
- Csus2: C-G-C-G-C-D (first five strings equivalent to Double-C tuning for the banjo
- Csus4+9: C-G-C-F-C-D (used by Martin Simpson in "We Are All Heroes", and by David Wilcox on "Come Away to Sea" from The Nightshift Watchman with the high string raised to E)
- Csus4: C-G-C-F-G-C (used by John Renbourn on "Bouree I & II")
- C♯sus4: C♯-G♯-C♯-F♯-G♯-C♯ - used by 3301 in the puzzle song "The Instar Emergence".
- Low C: C-G-D-G-A-D (used by David Wilcox on "High Hill", "Covert War", "Chet Baker's Unsung Swan Song", "Break in the Cup", "Show Me the Key", "Silent Prayer", and "Leaving You")
- Dsus2: D-A-D-E-A-D (used by David Wilcox on "How Did You Find Me Here")
- Dsus4: D-A-D-G-A-D (devised by British guitarist Davey Graham in the late 1950s, associated with French acoustic guitarist Pierre Bensusan, and used by Jimmy Page of Led Zeppelin for a number of songs including "Kashmir" and "Black Mountain Side"; also used by David Wilcox on multiple songs, occasionally tuning half a step down). Also used by 3301 in the puzzle song "Interconnectedness".
- Esus2: E-B-E-F♯-B-E (used by My Bloody Valentine in "Only Shallow" and by John Mayer in "Something's Missing," "Wherever You Go," "Heart So Heavy," and "In Your Atmosphere").
- Esus4: E-B-E-A-B-E, E-A-B-E-B-E (the latter used by Jars of Clay on their debut album Jars of Clay)
- E7sus4: E-A-D-E-B-E (used by Ed Sheeran in "Tenerife Sea.")
- EEEEBE a.k.a. "Bruce Palmer Modal Tuning," as named and used by Stephen Stills in "Suite: Judy Blue Eyes where Stills uses this tuning while the other guitar is in standard tuning.)
- E modal: E-B-E-E-B-E
  - E modal alternative: E-E-B-B-B-B (used by Soundgarden on the songs "The Day I Tried To Live", "My Wave", and "Been Away Too Long")
- Drake's Drone: B-E-B-E-B-E (used by Nick Drake in many of his songs, including "Man in a Shed" and "From the Morning")
- Gsus2: D-G-D-G-A-D
- Gsus4: D-G-D-G-C-D (first five strings equivalent to Sawmill tuning for the banjo)
  - Gsus4/4 / Orkney Tuning: C-G-D-G-C-D
  - Alternative Gsus4: G-C-D-G-C-D (used by Swervedriver throughout their career, starting with the album Mezcal Head)

=== Extended chord ===
In extended chord tunings, the open strings form a seventh, ninth, or eleventh chord.

- B add4: E-B-D♯-F♯-B-E (used by This Town Needs Guns on "Adventure, Stamina, and Anger" and "Left-Aligned", and Bon Iver on "Perth")
- C6: C-A-C-G-C-E (used by Jimmy Page in "Bron-Yr-Aur", "Friends" and "Poor Tom")
- C6/9: C-G-C-E-A-D
- Cmaj11: C-F-C-G-B-E (used by Soundgarden on the song "4th of July")
- Cm add4: C-F-C-G-C-D♯ (used by This Town Needs Guns on "Baboon" and "Lemur")
- Open Page/Csus2/Gsus4: D-G-C-G-C-D (used by Jimmy Page in "The Rain Song")
- Dm7: D-A-D-F-A-C (used by Richie Havens in "From the Prison")
- Dm9: D-A-D-F-C-E
- Dm add9: D-A-D-F-A-E (used by Opeth on Ghost Reveries)
- Dadd9: D-A-D-F♯-A-E (used by Coby & Simone on "Butterflies in Space")
- D6: D-A-D-F♯-B-D
- D7: D-A-D-F♯-A-C
- Dmaj7: D-A-D-F♯-A-C♯ (used by Coby & Simone on "Coloured Visions")
- D♯m add2/4: F-G♯-D♯-F♯-A♯-D♯ (used by This Town Needs Guns on "Chinchilla" and "Gibbon")
- Em7/C: C-G-D-G-B-E (used by Soundgarden on the songs "Mailman", and "Limo Wreck", Richard Thompson on "1952 Vincent Black Lightning", Melvins on "Evil New War God", and Pavement on several songs)
- Fmaj9: F-A-C-G-C-E (used by American Football on "Never Meant" and This Town Needs Guns on "Crocodile")
- G6: D-G-D-G-B-E (used by Soundgarden on the songs "Dusty", "Fresh Tendrils", "Never Named", and "Superunknown")
- G7: D-G-D-G-B-F
- Gmaj7: D-G-D-F♯-B-D
- A♯maj7: A♯-F-A♯-D-A-D (extremely rare)
- Gadd4: D-G-D-G-B-C (used by Soundgarden on "Like Suicide")
- Em11: E-B-D-G-A-D (used by Crosby, Stills & Nash on "Guinnevere")

== Regular tunings ==
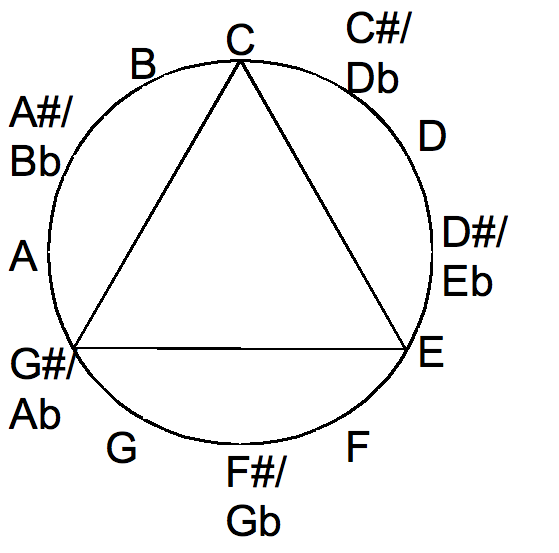
For every major-thirds tuning, the consecutive open-notes are separated by four semitones, and so three strings cover the twelve notes of the octave.

=== Major seconds ===
C-D-E-F♯-G♯-A♯ or C♯-D♯-F-G-A-B

A compact tuning that fits within one octave and covers the chromatic scale between open strings and the first fret.

=== Minor thirds ===
C-D♯-F♯-A-C-D♯

In the minor-thirds tuning, every interval between successive strings is a minor third. In the minor-thirds tuning beginning with C, the open strings contain the notes (C, D♯, F♯) of the diminished C chord.

=== Major thirds ===
Major-thirds tuning is a regular tuning in which the musical intervals between successive strings are each major thirds. Unlike all-fourths and all-fifths tuning, major-thirds tuning repeats its octave after three strings, which again simplifies the learning of chords and improvisation.

Neighboring the standard tuning is the major-thirds tuning that has the open strings

E-G♯-C-e-g♯-c'.

A lower major-thirds tuning has the open strings

C-E-G♯-c-e-g♯,

which "contains two octaves of a C augmented chord".

=== All fourths ===
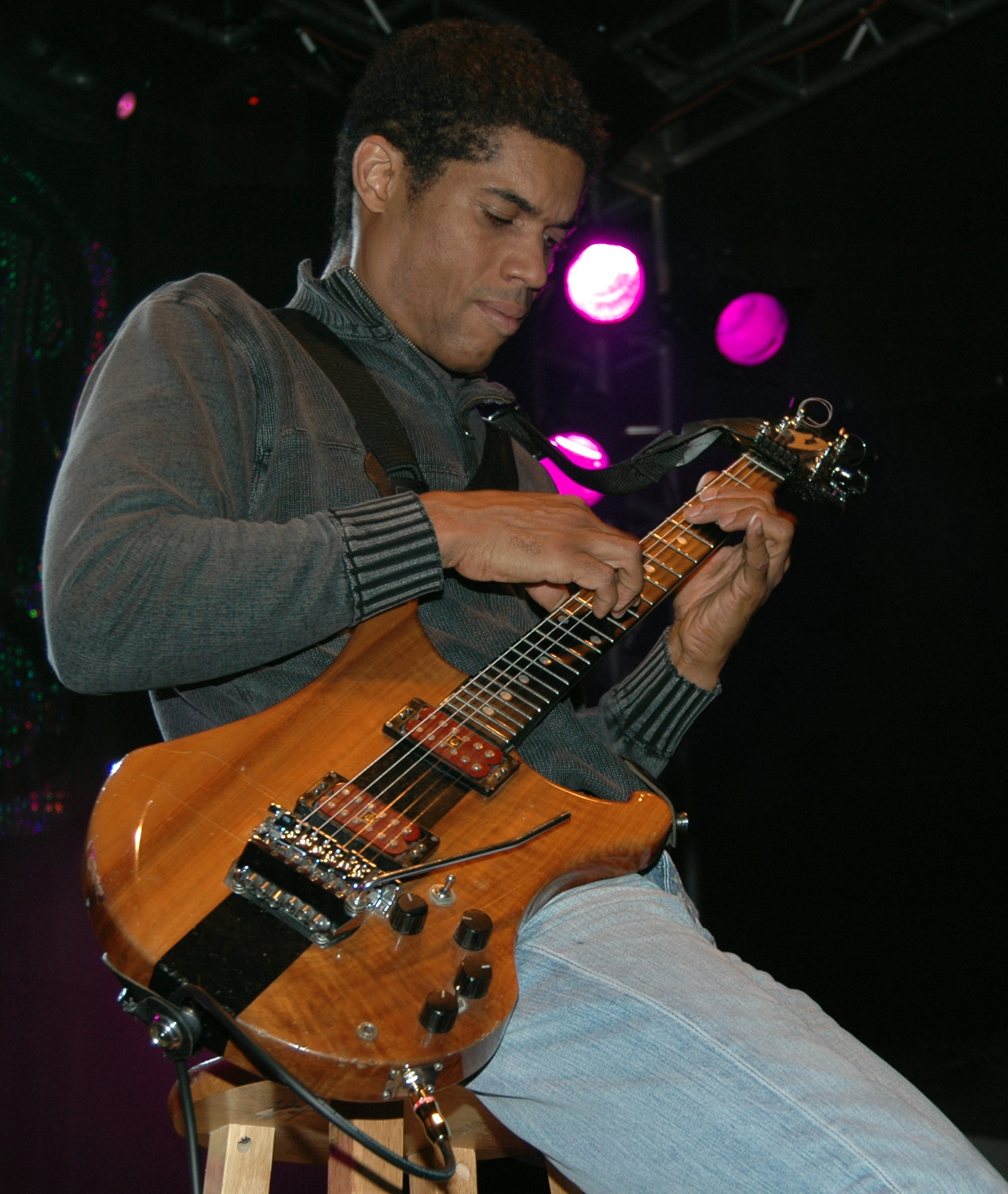
Stanley Jordan plays guitar using all-fourths tuning.

E-A-d-g-c'-f'

This tuning is like that of the lowest four strings in standard tuning. Jazz musician Stanley Jordan plays guitar in all-fourths tuning; he has stated that all-fourths tuning "simplifies the fingerboard, making it logical".

=== Augmented fourths ===
C-F♯-c-f♯-c'-f♯' or B-F-b-f-b'-f'

Between the all-fifths and all-fourths tunings are augmented-fourth tunings, which are also called "diminished-fifths" or "tritone" tunings.

=== All fifths: "Mandoguitar" ===
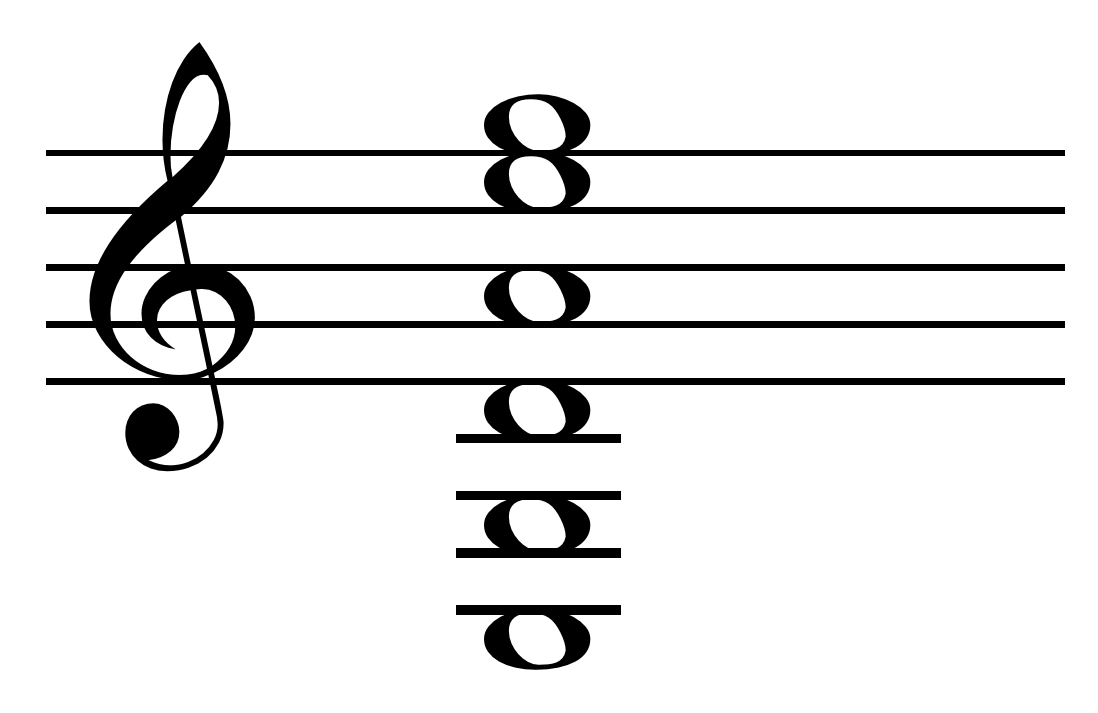
New standard tuning.

New Standard Tuning's open strings.

C-G-D-A-E'-B' or G'-D-A-E'-B-F♯'

All-fifths tuning is a tuning in intervals of perfect fifths like that of a mandolin, cello or violin; other names include "perfect fifths" and "fifths". It has a wide range, thus it requires an appropriate range of string gauges. A high b' string has been recently developed by Octave4Plus gauged at .006 which is considerable thinner than most guitar strings on the market, but under low tension to prevent breakage.

==== New standard tuning ====
C-G-D-A-E'-g'

All-fifths tuning has been approximated by the New Standard Tuning (NST) of King Crimson's Robert Fripp. It has a wider range than standard tuning, and its perfect-fifth intervals facilitate quartal and quintal harmony.

=== Ostrich tuning ===
E-E-e-e-e'-e' or C-C-c-c-c'-c'

Ostrich tuning is a tuning where all strings are tuned to the same note over two or three octaves, creating an intense, chorused drone.

Used by Soundgarden (E-E-e-e-e'-e') on the song "Mind Riot", and by Lou Reed in the Velvet Underground.

Goo Goo Dolls have used a similar tuning (B-D-D-D-d-d) on their song "Iris".

Nine Inch Nails uses a variation of this tuning (D-D-d-d-d-d) on the song “God Break Down the Door”.

== Dropped ==
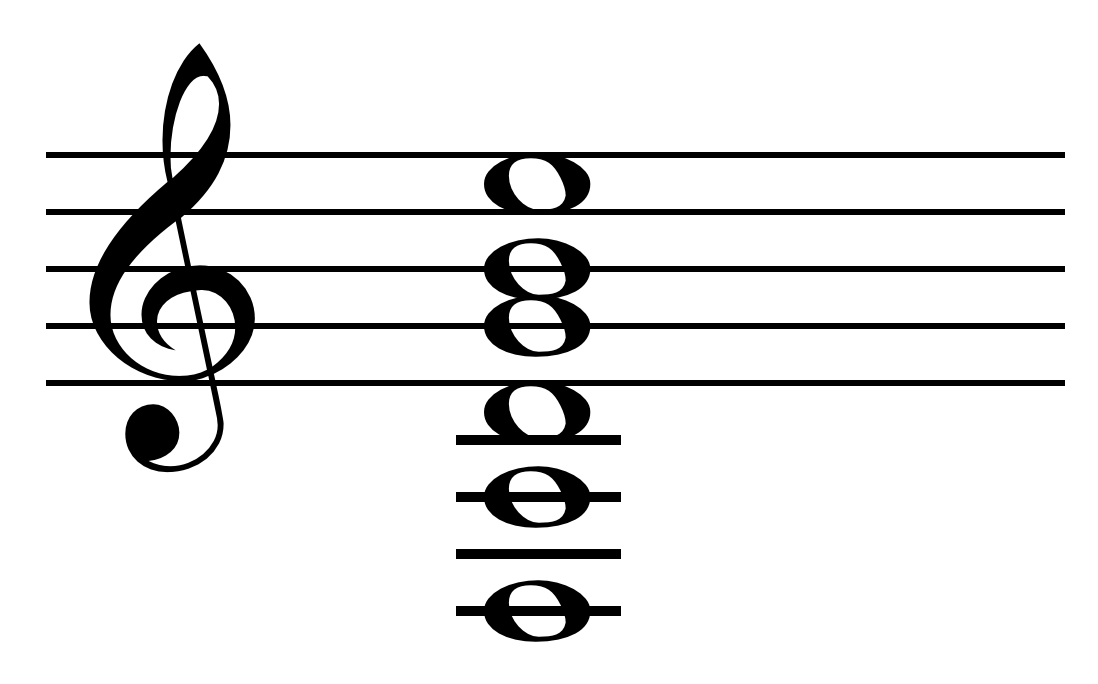
Drop D tuning

Drop tunings lower the sixth string, dropping the lowest E string of the standard tuning. Some drop tunings also lower the fifth string (the A-note in standard-tuning). A drop one tuning lowers the pitch by one full step.

Some lower tunings may call for a baritone guitar to more easily maintain high string tension and a rich tone. Others can be achieved using a capo and/or a partial capo.

=== Examples ===
- Drop D tuning (listen)
  Drop D – D-A-D-G-B-E
  Standard tuning but with the 6th string dropped one full step. Utilized by Metallica on "All Nightmare Long" and "Just A Bullet Away", Chino Moreno of Deftones used this tuning on the songs "Hole in the Earth", "Cherry Waves" and "Beauty School", Foo Fighters on songs such as "Everlong" and "Monkey Wrench." C3 Church on their song "Breathe", Guns N' Roses on "Chinese Democracy" and "Sorry" from Chinese Democracy, Black Veil Brides on the song "Knives and Pens", David Wilcox on "Daddy's Money", "Jamie's Secret", "Common as the Rain", "(You Were) Going Somewhere", "Last Chance Waltz", "All the Roots Grow Deeper When It's Dry" and "Waffle House", Aerosmith on "Livin' on the Edge", The Beatles on "Dear Prudence" and Iron Maiden on "Mother of Mercy", "If Eternity Should Fail". Senses Fail and Avenged Sevenfold on most of their discographies.
- Drop C♯/Drop D♭ – C♯-G♯-c♯-F♯-A♯-D♯ / D♭-A♭-D♭-G♭-B♭-E♭
  One half step down from Drop D. Utilized by Alice in Chains on "Them Bones" and "We Die Young", Linkin Park on the albums Hybrid Theory and Meteora, A Day to Remember on the song "It's Complicated", Chevelle (on Sci-Fi Crimes), Three Days Grace on their songs "Just Like You", "The High Road", "Every Other Weekend", "Lifetime", "No Tomorrow" and "Champion", Steel Panther on songs like "17 Girls in a Row" and "Gloryhole". Metallica used this tuning on their song "– Human" off S&M and on "Dirty Window" from their album St. Anger, Scorpions on "Hour I", Judas Priest on "Lone Wolf", Van Halen on their 1981 song "Unchained", Godsmack on "Something Different", Helmet on "I Know", "Speechless", "Overrated" from Betty, "Unwound", "Throwing Punches" from Size Matters. and Spiritbox on "1016", "The Mara Effect, Pt.2" and "Perennial"

Drop C tuning (listen)

- Drop C – C-G-c-F-A-D
  One full step down from Drop D. Used by System of a Down, Deftones on White Pony, Gojira, Mastodon, Avenged Sevenfold on the songs "Radiant Eclipse" and "Victim", Asking Alexandria on Reckless and Relentless, Metallica on St. Anger, Megadeth on the songs "Mission on Mars" and "Psychopathy", Johnny Cash on his cover of "Hurt", Slipknot on their demo Mate. Feed. Kill. Repeat., Nirvana on "Blew", Pantera on "It Makes Them Disappear" and "I'll Cast a Shadow" (425 Hz) and Finding September on "Summer Club" and "Let It Burn". David Wilcox tuned the fourth string up one semitone for his initial studio recording of "That's What the Lonely Is For" from Big Horizon.

- Drop B – B-F♯-b-E-G♯-C♯ / B-G♭-b-E-A♭-D♭
  One and one half steps down from Drop D. Used by Art of Dying, Black Stone Cherry, DevilDriver on their self-titled and The Fury of Our Maker's Hand albums, Disturbed (on Immortalized), Ill Niño on Till Death, La Familia, Limp Bizkit on some songs, Down, Machine Head tuned 40 cents sharp, Guns N' Roses on "Shackler's Revenge", Mark Tremonti on "Leave It Alone", "Giving Up", "Proof", "Decay", "All That I Got", and "Gone" from the All I Was sessions, as well as some songs from Cauterize and Dust, Projected, Rammstein "Meine Tränen", "Angst" and "Dicke Titten", Linkin Park on the song "Don't Stay", Sevendust (primary tuning, although several variations of them are also used), Slipknot, and Stone Sour, used by Chevelle on every album besides Point #1 and La Gargola, Bring Me the Horizon and Spiritbox on "The Mara Effect, Pt.1
- Drop A♯/Drop B♭ – A♯-F-a♯-D♯-G-C / B♭-F-b♭-E♭-G-C
  Two full steps down from Drop D. Used by Beartooth on the songs "Afterall", "Burnout", and "Body Bag", Metallica on the song "The Unnamed Feeling" from St. Anger, Dream Theater on the song "Dead Asleep" from Parasomnia, Emmure on Goodbye to the Gallows and The Respect Issue, and Chevelle on This Type of Thinking (Could Do Us In) and Vena Sera.
- Drop A – A-E-a-D-F♯-B / A-E-a-D-G♭-B
  Two and one half steps down from Drop D. Used by Slipknot, Filter on the songs "Columind" and "The Missing" from The Amalgamut and "Drug Boy" and "The Trouble with Angels" from The Trouble with Angels, The Ghost Inside on the songs "Out of Control" and "This is What I Know About Sacrifice". Trapt uses this tuning on their songs "Hollow Man", "Waiting", and "Sound Off". Sevendust on "What You Are", Sleeping With Sirens on their songs "Medicine (Devil in My Head)", "Ghost", and "P.S. Missing You" from their album How It Feels To Be Lost, Linkin Park on "Heavy Is The Crown".
- Drop G♯/Drop A♭ – G♯-D♯-g♯-C♯-F-A♯ / A♭-E♭-a♭-D♭-F-B♭
  Three full steps down from Drop D. Utilized by Metallica in the song "Invisible Kid" from St. Anger and Kublai Khan,Stone Sour on the song "Red City" from House of Gold & Bones – Part 2, Asking Alexandria on their self-titled album. Also used by Hollywood Undead on songs "Enemy" and "Already Dead". Staind also uses this tuning (G♯-D♯-G♯-C♯-F♯-A♯ to emulate a 7-string guitar), as well as several other modified variations of this, such as one in which the 5th string is also dropped from D♯ to C♯.
- Drop G – G-D-g-C-E-A
  Three and one half steps down from Drop D. Used by Darkest Hour on the song "Wasteland", Attack Attack!, Baroness on their first two EPs, Sleeping With Sirens on the song "Blood Lines", FTISLAND on the song "Shadows" and In Flames on the song "Transparent" from Reroute to Remain. Soulfly used this tuning on "Eye for an Eye" on their self-titled album, although live performances of this song are now in A standard.
- Drop F♯/Drop G♭ – F♯-C♯-f♯-B-D♯-G♯ / G♭-D♭-g♭-B-E♭-A♭
  Four full steps down from Drop D, or two full steps up from Drop D1. Limp Bizkit use a 4 string variant of the tuning (F♯-F♯-B-E) on the songs "Nookie", "Full Nelson" and "The One." Motionless in White on the song "</c0de>", Polaris on the song "The Crossfire." The Amity Affliction on the song "Fade Away." and Fit for a King on the song "Louder Voice." Staind uses a variation of this tuning (F♯-C♯-G♯-C♯-F♯-A♯).
- Drop F – F-C-f-A♯-D-G / F-C-f-B♭-D-G
  Four and one half steps down from Drop D, or one and a half steps up from Drop D1. Used by Conan (band) for their entire discography. Used by Attack Attack! on "The Wretched" off This Means War and "Press F". Used by Van Halen on "Little Guitars" off Diver Down.
- Drop E – E-B-e-A-C♯-F♯ / E-B-e-A-D♭-G♭
  Five full steps down from Drop D, or one full step up from Drop D1. Another Variation can be mixed with a Drop A as follows: E-A-e-a-D-G-B-e modeled on an 8 string or E-A-e-a-D-F♯-B/E-A-e-a-D-Gb-B on a seven-string guitar, Used by Currents, Starset on Horizons, Loathe (E-A-e-a-D-F♯/G♭), Humanity's Last Breath (E-B-e-A-G♯/A♭-a) and To The Grave/Body Prison guitarist Tom Cadden (E-A-e-A-D-G-B). The guitarist from Humanity's Last Breath (Buster Odeholm) has the 2 plain strings 1 note away from each other (Ab-a) in order to do dissonant chords without using finger stretching chords and also can be used sith the digitech whammy pedal live to introduce interesting harmonics & FX. Usually 27" or 28" Baritones are used for 6 string Drop E applications.
- Drop D♯/Drop E♭ – D♯-A♯-d♯-G♯-C-F / E♭-B♭-e♭-A♭-C-F
  Five and one half steps down from Drop D, or one half step up from Drop D1. This can also be a Drop D♯ standard octave variant tuning modeled on an 8 string D♯-G♯-d♯-g♯-C♯-F♯-A♯-d♯. Gravemind uses an altered version of Drop D♯ (which is a 6-string Drop A♯ with the low D♯) on their album Conduit.
- Drop D1 – D-A-d-G-B-E
  Six full steps (one octave) down from Drop D. 8 string example; D-A-d-a-d-G-B-E. Black Tongue uses this tuning.
- Drop C♯1/Drop D♭1 – C♯-G♯-c♯-F♯-A♯-D♯ / D♭-A♭-D♭-G♭-B♭-E♭
  Six full steps (one octave) down from Drop C♯/Drop D♭. Used by Loathe (C♯-A-E-a-D-F♯)
- Drop C1 – C-G-c-F-A-D
  Six full steps (one octave) down from Drop C. Used by Sleep Token on “Asciensionism”.
- Drop C♯/Drop D♭ in standard variation – C♯-A-D-G-B-E
  Standard tuning but with the 6th string lowered one and a half steps. Used by Sevendust tuned one and a half-step down (A♯-F♯-B-E-G♯-C♯) on some songs from Home through Alpha.
- Drop C in standard variation – C-A-D-G-B-E
  Standard tuning but with the 6th string lowered two whole steps. Used by Mark Tremonti on the song "My Champion" (tuned down a half-step; Myles is in Open F♯ tuning) as well as Sevendust on the song "Mountain" tuned down one and a half steps (A-F♯-B-E-G♯-C♯) Also used by John Mayer on the song "Neon", and by Chino Moreno of Deftones on some songs such as "Swerve City", "Leathers" and "Hearts/Wires", tuned down a full step (A♯-G-C-F-A-D), This variation was also used by Periphery on "Totla Mad" from their Self-Titled album and "Frak the Gods" on "Icarus EP".
- Drop B in standard variation – B-A-D-G-b-E
  Claimed to have been invented by guitarist Victor Griffin of Pentagram (who tunes it 1/2 step down). Also used in the songs "Rusty Cage" "Holy Water", and "Searching With My Good Eye Closed" by Soundgarden on their Badmotorfinger album, "Cowboy Hat", "Not Leavin' Yet" and some of "Silver Side Up" by Nickelback, "Gasoline", "Shadow on the Sun", "Bring Em Back Alive" and "The Worm" by Audioslave and "Prison Sex" by Tool. Today is the Day have used it on every album since Temple of the Morning Star, Shining use it on most of their album Blackjazz, and Black Label Society used this on much of their early material, often to emulate a 7-string guitar. Used also by Silverchair in the songs "One Way Mule" and "The Lever" from their album Diorama and Stephen Brodsky used this tuning a half step down (A♯-G♯-C♯-F♯-A♯-D♯) in Cave In and Mutoid Man
- Drop B-E – B-E-D-G-b-e
  Standard tuning with the 6th and 5th string lowered two and a half steps down. Used by Tool in the songs "Parabol" and "Parabola".
- Drop A in standard variation – A-a-D-G-B-E:
  The 6th string is dropped to A while the other strings retain their standard tuning. Used by Helmet on "Biscuits for Smut", Foo Fighters on "Stacked Actors", Avenged Sevenfold on "G", Opeth on the song "Sorceress", and the Melvins on "Boris". Used by Every Time I Die on the songs "Indian Giver", "Fear and Trembling" and "Nothing Visible; Ocean Empty". A 7-string version of this tuning is used by Muse on their song "Citizen Erased" (A-a-D-d-G-B-E) as well as on Supremacy, which features a standard six-string guitar. Sevendust uses this tuning a half-step down on "Home" (G♯-g♯-C♯-F♯-A♯-D♯). Pantera uses this tuning 1 full step down on "The Underground in America" and "Sandblasted Skin" (425 Hz) (G-g-C-F-A-D), Periphery also uses this tuning on "Reptile" and "Zagreus". Architects use this tuning 1½ steps down (F♯-f♯-B-E-G♯-C♯) as well as Slipknot on the song "Scissors" and Limp Bizkit on the song "Stalemate." Wage War uses this tuning 2 full steps down on several songs (F-f-A♯-D♯-G-C).
- Drop A in D standard variation – A-G-C-F-a-D Used by Mastodon on most of their first album (Remission) and on some songs on other albums. Also utilized by Nothing More and Periphery. Also used on occasion by Black Label Society, who previously tuned it a half-step up, which Alter Bridge also utilizes on some of their songs such as "Broken Wings", "Come to Life", "I Know it Hurts", "Still Remains", "Breath Again", and "All Hope is Gone." Creed, Architects, all use this tuning tuned a half-step down on their songs "Bread of Shame", "Early Grave" respectively. Danish industrial metal band Raunchy used this tuning tuned 1½ steps down (F♯-E-A-D-f♯-B) on the song "Dim the Lights and Run" from the album A Discord Electric.
- Drop G in C standard variation – G-F-A♯-D♯-g-C Used by Bring Me the Horizon on a few songs from their album Suicide Season, "Blacklist" from There Is A Hell and "heavy metal" from amo, Wage War also utilize this tuning on several songs on their first three albums, such as "The River" and "Spineless" off their album Blueprints.

== Shifted ==
These tunings are derived by systematic increases or decreases to standard tuning.

=== Lowered (standard) ===
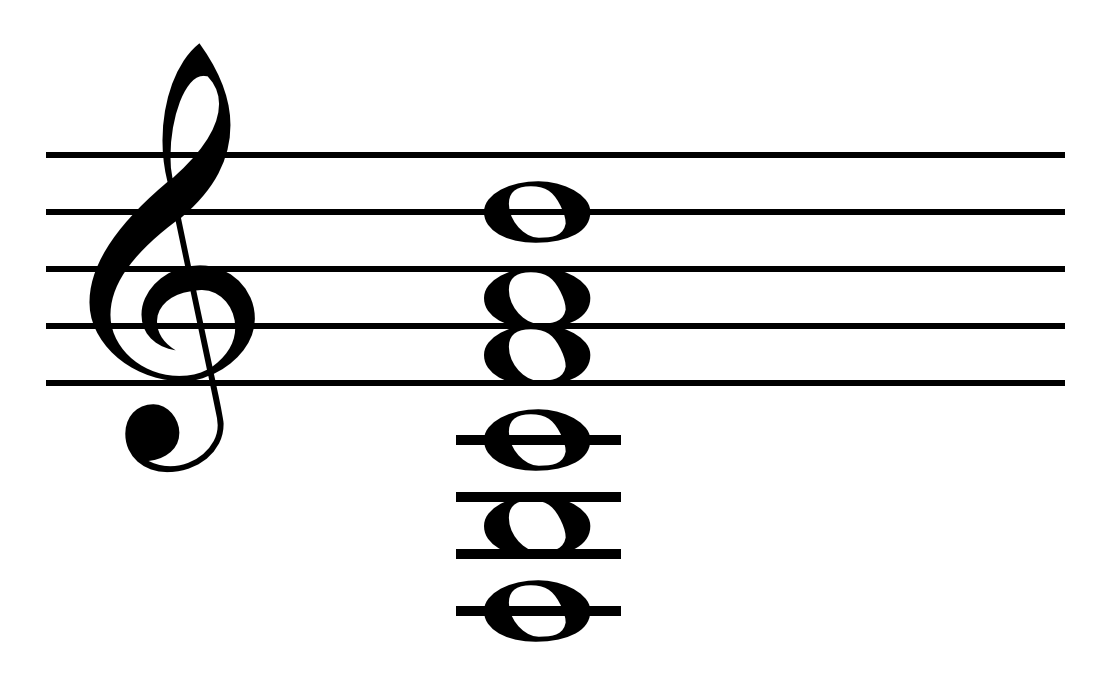
D tuning.

Derived from standard E-A-D-G-B-E, all the strings are tuned lower by the same interval, thus providing the same chord positions transposed to a lower key. Lower tunings are popular among rock and heavy metal bands. The reason for tuning down below standard pitch is usually either to accommodate a singer's vocal range or to get a deeper/heavier sound.

- E♭ tuning – E♭-A♭-D♭-G♭-B♭-E♭
  Half a step down from standard tuning. Used by bands/artists such as: Jimi Hendrix, Coheed and Cambria, Black Sabbath, Motörhead, Cannibal Corpse (Chris Barnes era), Deicide, Sweet Savage, Dark Tranquillity, Nirvana, AFI, Rise Against, Failure, Weezer, Seether (early songs), Green Day, Protest the Hero, Kiss, Our Lady Peace, the Hellacopters, Backyard Babies, Disturbed on a few songs, Guns N' Roses, Motion City Soundtrack, Neil Young, Van Halen, Extreme, Brand New, Blind Guardian, Firehouse, Stryper, Megadeth on the songs "Angry Again" and "Diadems", "Youthanasia" album and the tour supporting it, MD.45, Metallica on the "Load", "Reload" and "Garage Inc." albums, "The God That Failed", their cover of "Killing Time", in a 1985 live performance in Portland, Oregon, in a 1990 live performance with Guns N' Roses and Sebastian Bach, and in live performances of standard tuned songs since 1995, AC/DC on some songs and in live performances of standard tuned songs since 2008, The Beatles on "Please Mr. Postman" and in their North American debut on The Ed Sullivan Show, Darkthrone on their album Panzerfaust, Slayer, Alcest, Rage Against the Machine, Budgie, Stevie Ray Vaughan, John Prine on The Singing Mailman Delivers and live performances of "Angel from Montgomery" from 1998 to 2020, Yngwie Malmsteen, Deftones on "Mascara" and "Dai the Flu", Dream Theater on "Stream of Consciousness" and "The Root of All Evil", Alice in Chains, the Smashing Pumpkins, the Killers, Relient K, Suede, RED on "Not Alone", Beach House, David Wilcox on "Human Cannonball" from Turning Point and current live performances of "Saturday They'll All Be Back Again", Ugly Kid Joe, Third Day on "I Can Feel It", Die Ärzte since "Geräusch", Skillet on "A Little More", Diamond Head on most songs from Lightning to the Nations 2020, Sue Saad and the Next on the album version of "Looker", Vertical Horizon, Tyler Bryant & the Shakedown, Finding September on "History" and "Inhibitions", Breaking Benjamin on "Ladybug" and many of their live cover songs, and Royal Blood on songs like Typhoons and the B-side off "How Did We Get So Dark?", "Cheap Affection". Collective Soul has used this tuning and the Drop Db variant on many official recordings of songs and all live performances circa 1997 onward. Lovejoy has used this tuning in most of their songs since 2021.
- D tuning – D-G-C-F-A-D
  One full step down from standard tuning. Used by bands/artists such as Mötley Crüe, Nightwish, Pantera (425 Hz), Fu Manchu, P.O.D., Sepultura, Dimmu Borgir, Cradle of Filth, Behemoth, Insomnium, Watain, In Solitude, Agalloch, Inquisition, Drive-By Truckers, Soulfly, Holocaust, Children of Bodom since 1999, Symphony X, Oceansize, Death, Decrepit Birth, Dream Theater, All That Remains, Baroness, Napalm Death, Volbeat, Seether on "Country Song", Exodus, Gojira, Hammerfall since 2009, John Prine on "Grandpa Was a Carpenter" and some other songs from 1998 to 2020, Shadows Fall, Mastodon, Ghost, Lordi, Killswitch Engage, and Kreator. Used in a vast majority of songs by musician Elliott Smith, and also in some songs by Johnny Cash including "Ring of Fire" and his covers of "Sunday Mornin' Comin' Down" and "Cat's in the Cradle". Also used in Nirvana's songs "Come as You Are", "Lithium" and "Drain You", Metallica in their songs "Sad but True", "Devil's Dance", "Sabbra Cadabra", "It's Electric", and "Whiskey in the Jar", as well as "The Small Hours" and "Crash Course in Brain Surgery" from The $5.98 E.P. - Garage Days Re-Revisited, "Dream No More", "The Thing That Should Not Be" and live performances of "Jump in the Fire", "The God That Failed", and "Seek & Destroy", Bullet for My Valentine on several songs on Scream Aim Fire, John Lennon in "Working Class Hero", Bob Dylan in live performances of "All Along the Watchtower" in the style of Jimi Hendrix, the Damned on their cover of "White Rabbit", Blink-182 on "Adam's Song", Doug Anthony All Stars in live performances, Diamond Head on their 2020 re-recording of "It's Electric", John Fogerty, Firehouse on the re-recorded acoustic version of "Love of a Lifetime" and live performances since 2010, Stryper on the album The Final Battle and live performances since 2021, Extreme on live performances of the song "More Than Words", Chevelle on most of Point #1. Megadeth used this tuning for "Prince of Darkness" and would switch to this tuning from E standard during concerts featuring this song in 1999 & 2000. They have also used it for all concerts from circa Fall 2012 during the Countdown to Extinction 20th Anniversary tour to 2026's farewell tour and would go on to record all new albums since 2013's Super Collider using this tuning.
- C♯/D♭ tuning – C♯-F♯-B-E-G♯-C♯ / D♭-G♭-B-E-A♭-D♭
  One and a half steps down. Famously used by Black Sabbath's Tony Iommi in the 1970s, as well as Carrie Brownstein, Pantera (425 Hz), Behemoth, Eyehategod, Decapitated, Architects, Dying Fetus, Anata, Corin Tucker of Sleater-Kinney, Between the Buried and Me, Limp Bizkit, Machine Head (tuned 40 cents sharp), Down, Suffocation, Venom, Mayhem on their EP Deathcrush (445hz), All That Remains, Bolt Thrower, Pete Loeffler of Chevelle on Wonder What's Next, Billy Howerdel of A Perfect Circle and Ashes Divide, Guns N' Roses on "Heartbreak Hotel" and "I Don't Care About You", Attila, Slayer on "Gemini" from Undisputed Attitude, Diabolus In Musica, the majority of God Hates Us All as well as "Cult" and "Black Serenade" from Christ Illusion, Slipknot on "Snuff", "Child of Burning Time" and "'Til We Die", and Stone Sour. Also used by Kyuss on the Sons of Kyuss EP and on the songs "Isolation", "Big Bikes" and "Stage III" from Wretch. John Prine downtuned most of his songs to this tuning for the rest of his life following a bout with throat cancer that took a toll on his voice. Used by Metallica on the song "Bad Seed" from the album Reload and live performances of "The Thing That Should Not Be", blink-182 in "Obvious", Woods of Ypres and Gorguts on Considered Dead and The Erosion of Sanity.
- C tuning – C-F-B♭-E♭-G-C / C-F-A♯-D♯-G-C
  Two full steps down from normal tuning. Used by bands such as Queens of the Stone Age, Kyuss, Sleep, Electric Wizard on their first album, Black Sabbath on The End Tour for songs originally in C♯ Standard, Spiritual Beggars, In Flames until Clayman, the Black Dahlia Murder, Cradle of Filth, Hatebreed, Bring Me the Horizon, First Signs of Frost, Dismember, Dethklok, Suffocation on Effigy of the Forgotten, Immolation, Hypocrisy from 1992 to 1997, High on Fire, Cold, Dream Theater, Arch Enemy since the Angela Gossow era, Entombed, Amaranthe, Nails, Nekrofilth, Cataract, Porcupine Tree on the songs "Anesthetize", "Way Out of Here" and "Cheating the Polygraph", and the Smashing Pumpkins.
- B tuning – B-E-A-D-G♭-B / B-E-A-D-F♯-B
  Two and a half steps down from standard tuning. Used by bands such as, At The Gates, Dismember, Hypocrisy from 1994 to 2004, Edge of Sanity, Entombed on Left Hand Path, Grave, Amon Amarth, and Arch Enemy during the Johan Liiva era, as well as Fear Factory on the first two albums before Dino Cazares switched to 7-string guitars, Carcass, Type O Negative, Cathedral, Pungent Stench from 1988 to 1990 including For God Your Soul... For Me Your Flesh, John Prine on live performance of "Fish and Whistle" from 1998 to 2020, Seventh Void, Five Finger Death Punch, Fleshgod Apocalypse, Sepultura, Soulfly, Within Temptation, Hatebreed, Winterfylleth, Triptykon as well as Celtic Frost's last album Monotheist, and guitarist Kirk Windstein of Crowbar, Kingdom of Sorrow.
- A♯/B♭ tuning – A♯-D♯-G♯-C♯-F-A♯ / B♭-E♭-A♭-D♭-F-B♭
  Three full steps from standard tuning. Used by Electric Wizard on Dopethrone, Adema, Hypocrisy since Virus, Dream Theater on some songs with baritone guitars, Arch Enemy on some songs, the Black, Boris, Cannibal Corpse, Linkin Park (A♯-D♯-G♯-C♯-F♯-A♯) on the songs "Somewhere I Belong" and "Easier to Run" from Meteora (both songs performed live in Eb standard), Morbid Angel on several songs starting with their album Covenant, Father Befouled, Sepultura, Esoteric, Jeff Hanneman of Slayer on "War Zone" and "Here Comes the Pain" from God Hates Us All and "Not of This God" from World Painted Blood (Kerry King used a 7-string for those songs), American Head Charge, Nickelback on "This Means War" and "Gotta Get Me Some" from Here and Now and Nevermore when band switched to seven strings, though a six-string acoustic in this tuning was used on the song "A Future Uncertain".
- A tuning – A-D-G-C-E-A
  Three and a half steps down from standard tuning. Used by Demilich, Soulfly, Themes, Taproot, Xibalba, Yob, Wind Rose, John Prine on live performances of "Quiet Man" from 1998 to 2020, Dream Theater on some songs with baritone guitars, Hypocrisy on Osculum Obscenum and the song "Buried", Bolt Thrower on Realm of Chaos album, Dystopia, Arch Enemy on a few songs and on live performances of A♯ tuned songs and their cover of "Symphony of Destruction".
- G♯/A♭ tuning – G♯-C♯-F♯-B-D♯-G♯ / A♭-D♭-G♭-B-E♭-A♭
  Four full steps down from standard tuning. Utilized by Cannibal Corpse on some songs. Used by death/doom metal band Encoffination. Also used by Mark Tremonti on the song "In the Deep" (Myles Kennedy uses a 6-string guitar tuned to Drop Db in the song). Used by the brutal death metal band Putridity.
- G tuning – G-C-F-A♯-D-G / G-C-F-B♭-D-G
  Four and a half steps down from standard tuning. Used by the doom metal band Warhorse and the brutal death metal band Mortician and the sludge metal project Foreigns.
- F♯/G♭ tuning – F♯-B-E-A-C♯-F♯ / G♭-B-E-A-D♭-G♭
  Five full steps from standard tuning. Used by the death metal band Disfiguring the Goddess.
- F tuning – F-A♯-D♯-G♯-C-F / F-B♭-E♭-A♭-C-F
  Five and a half steps down from standard tuning. Used by the deathgrind band Maruta and the instrumental doom metal band Bongripper.
- Octave tuning – E-A-D-G-B-E
  Six full steps (one octave) down from standard tuning. The Low E has the same fundamental frequency as a bass guitar, essentially the same standard tuning as a bass guitar but with a high B and E added to mimic a regular guitar. This tuning is used on the Fender Bass VI and similar instruments. Notably used by John Lennon and George Harrison with the Beatles, Robert Smith of the Cure, Jack Bruce of Cream, and Deftones bassist Sergio Vega on their album Gore. In his early days with Ronnie Hawkins, future Band bassist Rick Danko was also seen with a Fender Bass VI. This is the tuning Earth used on their seminal drone doom album, Earth 2. Also used in some doom metal and sludge metal bands such as Wetlands and Thou.

=== Raised ===
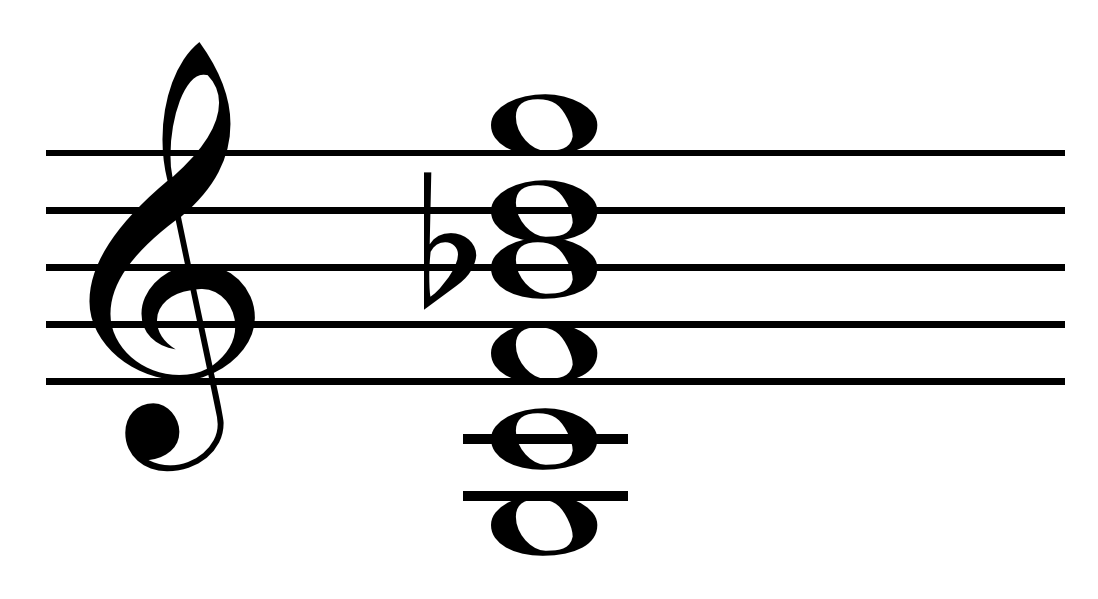
Terz tuning.

From standard E-A-D-G-B-E, all the strings are tuned up by the same interval. String tension will be higher. Typically requires thinner gauge strings, particularly the first string which could be as thin as six thousandths of an inch (about the thickness of a single human hair). A capo is typically preferred over these tunings, as they do not increase neck strain, etc. The advantage of these tunings is that they allow an extended upper note range versus a capo used with standard tuning which limits the number of notes that can be played; in some cases, instruo B♭ or E♭ (such as saxophones, which were frequently encountered in early rock and roll music) are more easily played when the accompanying guitar plays chords in the higher tuning. If standard gauge strings are used, the result is often a "brighter" or "tighter" sound; this was a common practice for some bluegrass bands in the 1950s, notably Flatt & Scruggs.

- F tuning – F-A♯-D♯-G♯-C-F / F-B♭-E♭-A♭-C-F
  Half a step up from standard tuning. Used in most of the music of The Carpenters, Harry Chapin, Joe Jackson, and Johnny Cash, for "Love Buzz" on Nirvana's Bleach album – apparently by mistake (according to Come As You Are – Michael Azerrad), 3 Doors Down on "Here Without You" (a capo was probably used), Vektor, Soundgarden's "Black Hole Sun" (The low E string was tuned to Eb/D♯ for a drop Eb/D♯ tuning), Nickelback on their song "When We Stand Together", Burzum on his first 3 albums, Immortal on Pure Holocaust, John Fedowitz in his solo project "Ceremony", The Bangles on "Hazy Shade of Winter", Social Distortion on "Ring of Fire", and AC/DC on "It's a Long Way to the Top (If You Wanna Rock 'n' Roll)".
- F♯/G♭ tuning – F♯-B-E-A-C♯-F♯ / G♭-B-E-A-D♭-G♭
  One full step up from standard. Primary tuning for the band The Chameleons. Johnny Marr also used this tuning extensively with The Smiths. British singer-songwriter Dave Mason also plays in F♯. Alex Lifeson of Rush used this tuning on the song "The Big Money". Tremonti uses a variation of this tuning where only the 6th string is raised to F♯ while the rest of the guitar stays in standard tuning, and then tuning down the whole guitar one and a half steps, on the song "Trust".
- G tuning also known as Terz tuning – G-C-F-A♯-D-G / G-C-F-B♭-D-G
  One and a half steps up from standard.
- G♯/A♭ tuning – G♯-C♯-F♯-B-D♯-G♯ / A♭-D♭-G♭-B-E♭-A♭
  Two full steps up from standard.
- A tuning – A-D-G-C-E-A
  Two and a half steps up from standard. This is the standard tuning for the Mexican Requinto guitar and the Lapstick travel guitar.
- A♯/B♭ – A♯-D♯-G♯-C♯-F-A♯ / B♭-E♭-A♭-D♭-F-B♭
  Three full steps up from standard.

=== Double-dropped ===
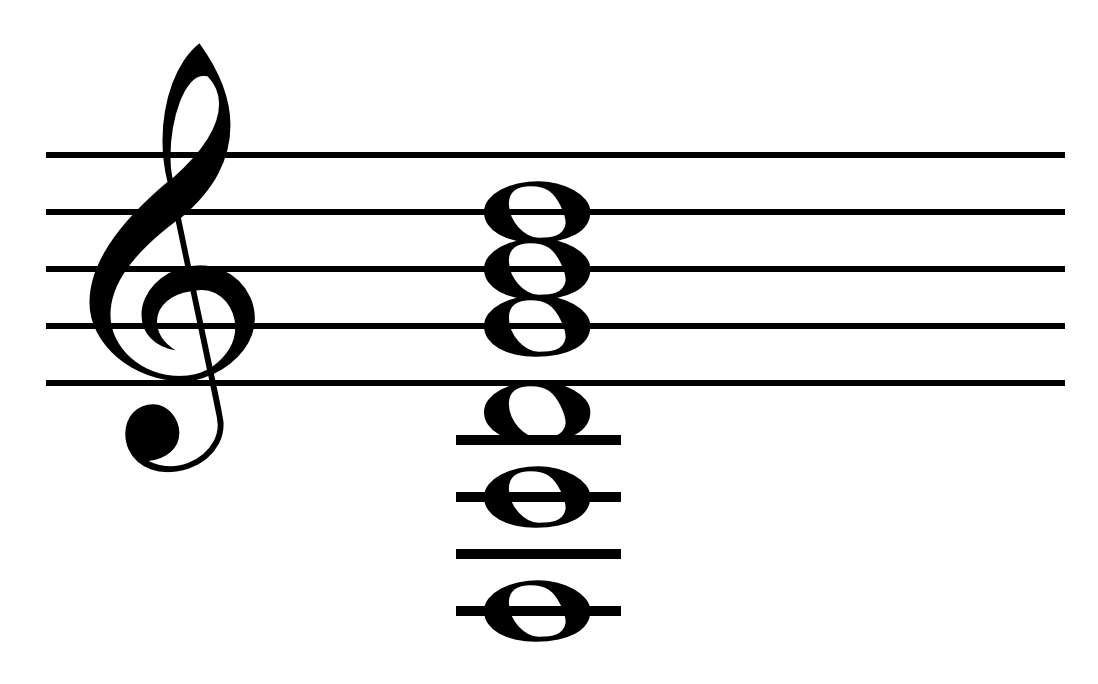
Double drop D tuning

Double drop D tuning (listen)

Similar to the dropped tunings, except that both the 1st and 6th strings are dropped one full step.

- Double Drop D – D-A-D-G-B-D
  Standard tuning but with the 1st and 6th strings dropped one full step. Favored by Neil Young. Has also been used by Lamb of God on some of their earlier songs. America used a variation for "Horse with No Name" in which the 5th string is also dropped, to E. It was also used on Led Zeppelin's "Going to California"
- Double Drop C♯/Drop D♭ – C♯-G♯-C♯-F♯-A♯-C♯ / D♭-A♭-D♭-G♭-B♭-D♭
  Same as Double Drop D, but every string is dropped one half step. Used by the acoustic rock band Days of the New. Also used by Our Lady Peace on the song "Starseed", as well as Los Angeles based Alternative band Failure on several songs. Also used by Tremonti on the song "Fall Again", as well as Myles Kennedy on the song "Cry a River" (Mark is tuned to Drop C♯)
- Double Drop C – C-G-C-F-A-C
  One full step down from Double Drop D. Used by End and Sevendust on the song "Seasons".
- Double Drop B – B-F♯-B-E-G♯-B / B-G♭-B-E-A♭-B
  One and one half steps down from Double Drop D. Used by Aaron Turner of Isis and used by Sevendust on the song "Separate".
- Double Drop A♯/Drop B♭ – A♯-F-A♯-D♯-G-A♯ / B♭-F-B♭-E♭-G-B♭
  Two full steps down from Double Drop D.
- Double Drop A – A-E-A-D-F♯-A / A-E-A-D-G♭-A
  Two and one half steps down from Double Drop D.
- Double Drop G♯/Drop A♭ – G♯-D♯-G♯-C♯-F-G♯ / A♭-E♭-A♭-D♭-F-A♭
  Three full steps down from Double Drop D.
- Double Drop G – G-D-G-C-E-G
  Three and one half steps down from Double Drop D.
- Double Drop F♯/Drop G♭ – F♯-C♯-F♯-B-D♯-F♯ / G♭-D♭-G♭-B-E♭-G♭
  Four full steps down from Double Drop D, or two full steps up from Double Drop D1.
- Double Drop F – F-C-F-A♯-D-F / F-C-F-B♭-D-F
  Four and one half steps down from Double Drop D, or one and a half steps up from Double Drop D1.
- Double Drop E – E-B-E-A-C♯-E / E-B-E-A-D♭-E
  Five full steps down from Double Drop D, or one full step up from Double Drop D1.
- Double Drop D♯/Double Drop E♭ – D♯-A♯-D♯-G♯-C-D♯ / E♭-B♭-E♭-A♭-C-E♭
  Five and one half steps down from Double Drop D, or one half step up from Double Drop D1.
- Double Drop D1 Tuning – D-A-D-G-B-D
  Six full steps (one octave) down from Double Drop D.

== Miscellaneous ==
=== Dad-Gad ===
DADGAD tuning (listen)

D-A-d-g-a-d'

DADGAD was developed by Davey Graham in the early 1960s when he was travelling in Morocco, to more easily play along with Oud music. Among the first to use this tuning were the folk-blues guitarists of the '60s like Bert Jansch, John Renbourn, Martin Carthy, and John Martyn. It was many years later in the 1970s that it became established for accompanists of traditional music, predominantly Scottish and Irish. Due to this popularity it is sometimes referred to as "Celtic" tuning, although this is misleading given its origin and its primary early use in a quite different field of music. Often vocalized as "Dad-Gad", DADGAD it is now common in Celtic music. In rock music, has been used in Led Zeppelin's "Kashmir". Pierre Bensusan is another noted exponent of this tuning. The post-metal group Russian Circles also employ this tuning, and also plays it tuned a half-step down: D♭-A♭-d♭-g♭-a♭-d♭'. Four down-tuned variations are used by the band Sevendust: A Drop C♯ variation, or C♯-G♯-c♯-f♯-g♯-c♯', Also uses a variation where the lowest string is dropped to G♯ on the song "Chop", A Drop C variation, or 'C-G-c-f-g-c'. (used on the song "Unraveling". Also uses a variation where the lowest string is dropped to G, used on some songs from Kill the Flaw and the song "Life Deceives You"), a Drop B variation, or B'-F♯-B-e-f♯-b, and a Drop A♯ variation, or A♯'-F-A♯-d♯-f-a♯. Neighboring tunings D-A-d-e-a-e' and C-G-c-d-g-a have been used by Martin Carthy, and D-A-d-a-a-d' was used by Dave Wakeling on the English Beat's 1983 "Save It For Later" and by My Bloody Valentine on the song "Sometimes" from Loveless (1991).

=== Dad-Dad ===
DADDAD tuning (listen)

D-A-d-d-a-d'

Nicknamed - "Papa-Papa". DADDAD is common in folk music (Irish, Scottish), and for the execution of a rhythm guitar in "heavy" (alternative music) on 6th on the third string at the same time. To reach the tuning from DADGAD, Open D or Open D Minor, the G string is dropped to D so that the 3rd and 4th strings are tuned to the same pitch. DADDAD tuning is sometimes used on Dobro guitars for rock and blues. Notable users of this tuning include Billy McLaughlin and John Butler. The tuning was also used in the title track of King Gizzard & the Lizard Wizard's third album, Float Along - Fill Your Lungs.

=== Cello/Standard guitar ===
C-G-d-a-b-e'

Essentially a cello tuning with the deeper four strings in fifths and the two highest strings in standard guitar tuning. Used on numerous Pavement songs (including Cut Your Hair) and by Foo Fighters on the song "Weenie Beenie".

=== "Karnivool" tuning ===
B-F♯-b-g-b-e'

Hybrid tuning between drop B-tuning and E-standard. Used by the band Karnivool for many of their songs.

- Variation:

B-F♯-b-f♯-b-e'

The hybrid tuning with the 3rd string lowered a half-step to create a larger power chord, Also used by Karnivool.

=== Mi-composé ===
E-A-d'-g-b-e'

Mi-composé is a tuning commonly used for rhythm guitar in African popular music forms such as soukous and makossa. It is similar to the standard guitar tuning, except that the d string is raised an entire octave. This is accomplished by replacing the d string with an e' string and tuning it to d'.

=== "Iris" Tuning ===
B-D-D-D-d-d

Tuning used by Johnny Rzeznik of the Goo Goo Dolls on the song "Iris".

=== E-A-C♯-F♯-A-C♯ ("Sleeping Ute") ===
Tuning used by Grizzly Bear guitarist Daniel Rossen in "Sleeping Ute", the opening song of their album Shields. Creates an F♯m7/E chord when strummed open.

=== José González tuning ===
D-A-D-G♭-B-E

This is a tuning favored by the Swedish singer-songwriter José González. He uses this on such songs as "Crosses", "Heartbeats" and "Cycling Trivialities" (capo on second fret). It is similar to the standard guitar tuning, but the low E string is dropped to D and the G string is dropped a half step to F♯/G♭. Also used by artists such as M. Ward, Stephen Malkmus, and Day Wave.

=== Dadd9 tuning ===
D-A-D-F♯-A-E

This tuning is used by Tonic in their song Soldier's Daughter with a capo on the 4th fret, Periphery uses this tuning a full step down on the song "Scarlet".

=== Mr.Tom tuning ===
D-F♯-A-E-F♯-A

This tuning was made by songwriter/composer Mr.Tom (Rawding) during the creation of an original indie folk instrumental "When You Stand By Me". The tuning is based on the Open D tuning.

=== Liberty tuning ===
E-A-D-g-c'-e'

Promoted by Harvey Reid for use in combination with a partial capo, as a system which is easier for children to learn.

=== The Day I Tried To Live tuning ===
E-E-B-B-B-b

Used on the track from American grunge band Soundgarden, titled The Day I Tried to Live.

=== Converge tuning ===
C-G-C-F-G♯-C

Used on the majority of Converge songs since Jane Doe

- Variation:

C-F♯-C-F♯-A-C

Another tuning used by Converge, notably used on the title track from Axe to Fall

=== El Ten Eleven tuning ===
E-A-D-G♯-B-E

Used on the Kristian Dunn of El Ten Eleven

=== Staind tuning ===
A♭-D♭-A♭-D♭-G♭-B♭ / G♯-C♯-G♯-C♯-F♯-A♯

A combination of Drop A♭and Drop D♭. Used by Mike Mushok on many songs, especially from Dysfunction and Break the Cycle.

- Variation:

G♭-D♭-A♭-D♭-G♭-B♭ / F♯-C♯-G♯-C♯-F♯-A♯

The previous tuning with the 6th string an additional step down, used on the song "Price to Play" and for all but one song on the Self-Titled album, these songs are played live on a 7-string with a high E♭ due to some leads being tracked in a higher tuning.

=== Microtonal tuning ===
The open strings of a guitar can be tuned to microtonal intervals, however microtonal scales cannot easily be played on a conventional guitar because the frets only allow for a chromatic scale of twelve equally spaced pitches, each a semitone apart. (Certain microtonal scales, particularly quarter tones, can be played on a standard guitar solely by adjusting tunings, but the distance between notes on the scale makes it somewhat impractical.) It is possible to play microtonal scales on a fretless guitar, to convert a fretted guitar into a fretless, or to make a custom neck with a specific microtonal fret spacing.

Guitars can also be refretted to a microtonal scale. On many refretted microtonal guitars, the frets are split, so that the tuning of each string is independent from the others. To enable an adjustable microtonal tuning, there exist guitars with frets that can be moved across the fingerboard.

Extended techniques such as the 3rd bridge technique, slide guitar and prepared guitar techniques can be used to produce microtonality without severe modification to the instrument.

=== Guitar tunings inspired by other Instruments ===
In his on-line guide to alternative tunings for six-string guitars, William Sethares mentions several that are inspired by instruments other than guitars, for example:

- balalaika tuning: E-A-D-E-E-A
- cittern tuning: C-G-C-G-C-G,
- Dobro tuning: G-B-D-G-B-D.
- Renaissance lute tuning: E-A-d-f♯-b-e'

This tuning may also be used with a capo at the third fret to match the common lute pitch: G-c-f-a-d'-g'. This tuning also matches standard vihuela tuning and is often employed in classical guitar transcriptions of music written for those instruments, such as, for instance, "La Canción Del Emperador" and "Diferencias Sobre Guardame Las Vacas" by Renaissance composer Luis de Narváez, or music inspired by this style, such as "Pavanna" and "Bicycle Tune" by John Renbourn.

== Five-string guitar tunings ==
When the guitar evolved from the renaissance lute in the 18th century it was a five-string instrument (baroque guitar). Today, five-string guitars are common in Brazil, where they are known as guitarra baiana and are typically tuned in 5ths. Schecter Guitar Research produced a production model five-string guitar called the Celloblaster in 1998. A five-string tuning may be necessary in a pinch when a string breaks on a standard six-string (usually the high E) and no replacement is immediately available.

Some basic five-string tunings include:

- Standard – E-A-d-g-b
  The standard tuning, without the top E string attached. Alternative variants are easy from this tuning, but because several chords inherently omit the lowest string, it may leave some chords relatively thin or incomplete with the top string missing (the D chord, for instance, must be fretted 5-4-3-2-3 to include F♯, the tone a major third above D).
- Baroque guitar standard tuning – a–D–g–b–e
  The predecessor of today's six-string classical guitar was the five-string baroque guitar tuned as the five high strings of a six-string guitar with the A raised one octave.
- High C – E-A-d-g-c'
  Standard tuning with the B tuned a half step higher to C to emulate a six-string bass guitar, minus the low B. This is an all fourths tuning.
- Celloblaster or Guitello – C-G-d-a-e'
  An all fifths tuning as used on cello or mandolin, extended to five strings. Used by the noise-rock band Lightning Bolt, and by Jeffrey McFarland-Johnson on his Bach Cello Suites album.
- Baritone – E-A-d-f♯-b
  In this tuning, the fourth (G) string is lowered a half-step, thus recreating the intervals between the top five strings, lowered a perfect fourth. Though chords can easily and more fully be played from this tuning, it sometimes results in awkward inversions, a relatively minor problem if the five-string is played in an ensemble with a bass guitar.
- Alternatively, E-A-c♯-f♯-b
  Simulates the top four strings, followed by the second-from-bottom string on top, raised a whole step (the F♯ representing both the top and bottom E). It makes playing in the key of A major easier, though chord fingerings have to be altered unless the strings are rearranged to F♯-B-E-A-C♯.
- Open G tuning – G-d-g-b-d'
  Some slide/bottleneck guitarists omit the bottom E string when playing in open G to have the root note as the tonic. This tuning is used by Keith Richards.
- Open E♭5 tuning – E♭-B♭-e♭-b♭-e♭'
  This is achieved by removing the fourth (G) string, tuning both Es and the B down a half step, and the A and D strings up a half-step. This creates a five-string power chord.
- Jacob Collier's "mirrored" tuning – D-A-e-a-d'
  As explained to the guitarist Paul Davids in a YouTube video.
  Jacob Collier can be seen and heard playing a custom made acoustic or electric five-string (almost?) any time he plays guitar. He claims that this tuning allows beginners easier access to guitar playing.

== Extended-range guitar tunings ==
=== Seven-string ===
Similar to five-string bass guitar tuning, seven-string tuning allows for the extra string a fourth lower than the original sixth string. This allows for the note range of B standard tuning without transposing E standard guitar chords down two and a half steps down. Baritone 7-string guitars are available which features a longer scale-length allowing it to be tuned to a lower range.

- Standard 7-string tuning – B'-E-A-d-g-b-e'
  Standard tuning for a seven-string guitar. Used by Fear Factory, In This Moment, Animals as Leaders, Unearth, Nickelback on the song "Burn It To The Ground" and more recent material, Decapitated, Trivium on much of Shogun, and The Crusade, Dream Theater, Linkin Park on the songs "With You" and "Runaway" when Brad Delson used to play a 7-string before switching to a 6-string, Crossfade on some songs, Hypocrisy, Lacuna Coil, All That Remains on some songs, and Wormed.
- Standard Choro tuning – C-E-A-d-g-b-e'
  Standard seven-string tuning for Brazilian choro.
- Thirds tuning – E-G♯-c-e-g♯-c'-e'
  Same range as standard six-string. Allows over two full chromatic octaves without changing position, slides or bends.
- All fourths tuning – B'-E-A-d-g-c'-f'
  Expands the major third between the second and third strings, extending range a half step higher.
- Russian Tuning – D-G-B-D-g-b-d
  6-string Open G tuning with an additional 5th B-string. Was a standard tuning for classic 7-string guitars in Russia in the 19th to 20th centuries.
- Open C Tuning – G-C-G-C-g-c-e 6-string Open C tuning with an additional 7th G-string. This was Devin Townsend's preferred tuning for the extreme metal band Strapping Young Lad, used on their last two albums. Also used on most of Synchestra and Ziltoid the Omniscient, "Planet of the Apes" from Deconstruction, "War Princess" from Z², "Failure" from Transcendence and "Monuments of Glitch" from The Puzzle.

==== Lower ====
- A♯/B♭ tuning – A♯'-D♯-G♯-c♯-f♯ -a♯-d♯' / B♭'-E♭-A♭-d♭-g♭ -b♭-e♭'
  Half a step down from standard. Used by bands such as Meshuggah in their earlier days, Jeff Loomis of Nevermore, Cannibal Corpse mid-career, Hypocrisy, Adema, American Head Charge, Sonata Arctica since Winterheart's Guild, Mushroomhead, Korn on the Neidermeyer's Mind demo album as well as on some songs from Issues and Take a Look in the Mirror, Revocation, Dir En Grey since "Dum Spiro Spero," After The Burial, Chad Kroeger of Nickelback on the song "This Means War" (Ryan Peake used a six-string), Slayer on "War Zone" and "Here Comes the Pain" from God Hates Us All, also "Not of This God" from World Painted Blood, Trivium since Silence in the Snow and all live performances of songs previously written on standard tuned seven string guitars.
- A tuning – A'-D-G-c-f-a-d'
  A full step down from standard. Used by bands such as Korn, Delain, Paradise Lost, Dream Theater on "False Awakening Suite" and "Illumination Theory" from the self-titled album, VUUR, Obscura, ReVamp, Hypocrisy on much of their self titled album, Job for a Cowboy on "Sun Eater", Knocked Loose from A Different Shade of Blue onwards and Fear Factory.
- G♯/A♭ tuning – G♯'-C♯-F♯-B-e-g♯-c♯' / A♭'-D♭-G♭-B-e-a♭-d♭'
  One and one half steps down from standard. Used by bands such as Deftones on their self-titled album and "Beware", Korn on the song "Alone I Break", but on 14-string guitars. Also used by Mark Tremonti on the song "Show Me A Leader" (Myles uses a 6-String guitar tuned to D♯ Standard) and Spiritbox on "Electric Cross".
- G tuning – G'-C-F-A♯-d♯-g-c' / G'-C-F-B♭-e♭-g-c'
  Two full steps down from standard tuning. Used by Fear Factory on some songs, Vildhjarta (G-C-F-A♯-D♯-G♯-c) and Luc Lemay of Gorguts
- F♯/G♭ tuning – F♯'-B'-E-A-d-f♯-b / G♭'-B'-E-A-d-g♭-b
  Two and one half steps down from standard. Used by Danish band Mnemic in the albums Passenger, Sons of the System, and Mnemesis. Fear Factory also used this tuning for their cover of Wiseblood's "0-0 (Where Evil Dwells)", while all their other songs tuned in F♯/G♭ were played with eight-string guitars.
- F tuning – F'-A♯'-D♯-G♯-c♯-f-a♯ / F'-B♭'-E♭-A♭-d♭-f-b♭
  Three full steps down from standard. Used by Suicide Silence on the song "Witness The Addiction", Crystal Lake and Meshuggah on "Rational Gaze", "Closed Eye Visuals", and "Straws Pulled at Random" from the original recording of Nothing (F-A♯-D♯-G♯-c♯-f♯-a♯).
- E tuning – E'-A'-D-G-c-e-a
  Three and a half steps down from standard. Used by Meshuggah on "Stengah", "Perpetual Black Second", "Glints Collide", and "Organic Shadows" from the original recording of Nothing (E-A-D-G-c-f-a).
- D♯/E♭ tuning – D♯'-G♯'-C♯-F♯-B-d♯-g♯ / E♭'-A♭'-D♭-G♭-B-e♭-a♭
  Four full steps down from standard. Used by Meshuggah on the song "Nebulous" from the original recording of Nothing (D♯-G♯-C♯-F♯-B-e-g♯).
- D tuning – D'-G'-C-F-A♯-d-g / D'-G'-C-F-B♭-d-g
  Four and one half steps down from standard.
- C♯/D♭ tuning – C♯'-F♯'-B'-E-A-c♯-f♯ / D♭'-G♭'-B'-E-A-d♭-g♭
  Five full steps down from standard.
- C tuning – C'-F'-A♯'-D♯-G♯-c-f / C'-F'-B♭'-E♭-A♭-c-f
  Five and one half steps down from standard.
- Octave Tuning – B"-E'-A'-D-G-B-e
  Six full steps (one octave) down from standard tuning.

==== Higher ====
- High A – E-A-d-g-b-e'-a' Standard tuning with a high 'A' instead of a low 'B'. Because of the high pitch of the 'A' string, guitars set up for this tuning usually require an exceptionally light top string and a short scale length (as used by Lenny Breau) or else a multi-scale fingerboard (fanned frets) to provide sufficient string tension.
- C tuning – C-F-A♯-d♯-g-c'-f' / C-F-B♭-e♭-g-c'-f'
  Half a step up from standard, used by Eddie Rendini during his time in Cold.
- C♯ tuning – C♯-F♯-B-e-a-c♯-f♯
  The whole step up from standard. This tuning was used by Wes Borland with high E-string being lowered to C♯ (C♯-F♯-B-e-g♯-c♯-c♯) during early live Limp Bizkit performances.
- Drop B variations – B-F♯-B-E-A-C♯-F♯ / B-F♯-B-E-G♯-C♯-F♯ / B-G♭-B-E-A-D♭-G♭A tuning which imitates the standard drop B tuning of a 6 string electric guitar, but with a high F♯ for soloing. Used by bands such as All Shall Perish, Decapitated, Unearth, and Assemble the Chariots.
- Drop A♯/Drop Bb variations – A♯-F-A♯-D♯-G♯-C-F / A♯-F-A♯-D♯-G-C-F A tuning combining 6-string Drop A♯, with a high F string, half-step above Drop A, Used by TesseracT and Monuments (A♯-F-A♯-D♯-F-A♯-D♯).

==== Dropped ====
These tunings have the lowest string (or other strings) tuned one full step lower allowing for chord structures similar to six-string drop tunings.

- Drop A – A-E-A-D-G-B-E
  A combination of standard 6 string tuning and a 7th string dropped one full step for power chords, used by Suicide Silence, Oceano, Thy Art Is Murder, Fit For An Autopsy, Chelsea Grin, Carnifex, and Whitechapel, Lacuna Coil, Emmure, Nile, Light the Torch, Betraying the Martyrs, Ice Nine Kills, Devin Holt of Pallbearer (Brett Campbell uses a 6-string), Blotted Science, New Years Day, In This Moment, Chimaira on Pass Out of Existence and Crown of Phantoms, and occasionally Scar Symmetry, King 810, Dry Kill Logic, Eldest 11, December In Red, A Fall To Break, and CFO$ on some songs. Also used by Nickelback on "Edge of a Revolution", "Get 'Em Up", and "For The River", DragonForce on their song "Three Hammers" from their album Maximum Overload, Dream Theater on the song "Viper King" from Distance Over Time, Tallah, and TesseracT (A-E-A-D-E-A-D).
- Alternatively, A-E-A-D-F♯-B-E
  The same as drop A tuning for a 6-string on the low strings while retaining a high E. In effect converts a 7-string into a drop A baritone guitar, but with standard tuning's soloing capability. Used by Lorna Shore, Volumes, and Whitechapel on the song "This Is Exile".
- Drop G♯/Drop A♭– G♯-D♯-G♯-C♯-F♯-A♯-D♯ / A♭-E♭-A♭-D♭-G♭-B♭-E♭
  One half step down from standard Drop A. Used by bands such as Trivium on some songs from Silence in the Snow, The Sin and the Sentence and What the Dead Men Say (album), Destrophy, 3TEETH, After The Burial, I Declare War, Impending Doom, Within the Ruins, In Hearts Wake, Shokran, Currents, Erra, Meshuggah on "The Abysmal Eye" and "Kaleidoscope", Thy Art Is Murder on the song "Slaves Beyond Death", Emmure on the song "Flag Of The Beast" (Pitch Shifted from Drop A), Periphery, Invent Animate, Jim Johnston on the song "I Bring the Darkness (End of Days)", Tallah on "Overconfidence", TesseracT (G♯-F-A♯-D♯-F-A♯-D♯) or (G♯-E-A-D-E-A-D), and Monuments (G♯-D♯-G♯-C♯-D♯-G♯-C♯).
- Drop G – G-D-G-C-F-A-D
  A full step from standard Drop A, used by such bands as Molotov Solution, Impending Doom, Hollow Front, Within the Ruins, Time, the Valuator, Alphawolf, InVisions, Annisokay, Emmure on the song "Protoman", Chelsea Grin, Attack Attack! on their album This Means War, Any Given Day, Fit for an Autopsy, Chimaira on some songs from "Pass Out of Existence", Knocked Loose, Whitechapel, Thy Art Is Murder on the song "Human Target" and "Eternal Suffering", and Born of Osiris since their album The Discovery.
- Drop F♯/Drop G♭ – F♯-C♯-F♯-B-E-G♯-C♯ / G♭-D♭-G♭-B-E-A♭-D♭
  One and one half steps down from standard Drop A. Used by Deftones on their Saturday Night Wrist album, Rivers of Nihil, Shokran, Spiritbox, Erra on some songs from Neon and ERRA, Thornhill, and Monuments on "I, The Destroyer" (F♯-D♯-G♯-C♯-D♯-G♯-C♯).
- Drop F – F-C-F-A♯-D♯-G-C / F-C-F-B♭-E♭-G-C
  Two full steps down from standard Drop A. This tuning is used by Attack Attack! on "The Hopeless," "The Abduction," and "The Wretched," DVSR, Northlane (F-B♭-F-B♭-E♭-G-C), 3TEETH on "Metawar", Vildhjarta (F-C-F-A♯-D♯-G♯-C), Monuments on "Admit Defeat" (F-F-A♯-D♯-F-A♯-D♯), Reflections, Conan, Opal In Sky on most of their music, and Triumphant Return (F-C-G-C-F-A-D).
- Drop E1 – E-B-E-A-D-F♯-B / E-B-E-A-D-G♭-B
  Two and one half steps down from standard Drop A. Used by Oceano, Currents and Erra on their most recent singles and Invent, Animate since their album "Heavener". A variant of this tuning is used by Vildhjarta (E-C-F-A♯-D♯-G♯-C) on their album "Måsstaden under vatten" a Pitch Shifter is heavily utilized. Northlane on "Vultures" and "Paradigm" on Alien and "Abomination" and "Inamorata" on Obsidian (E-A-E-A-D-F♯-B).
- Drop D1♯/Drop E1♭ – D♯-A♯-D♯-G♯-C♯-F-A♯ / E♭-B♭-E♭-A♭-D♭-F-B♭
  Three full steps down from standard Drop A. A variation of this tuning is used by Northlane since the Alien album (E♭-A♭-E♭-A♭-D♭-F-B♭) and also used by Invent, Animate on the song "Absence Persistent", as well as regular Drop D♯ on the majority of their album "Heavener".
- Drop D1 – D-A-D-G-C-E-A
  Three and one half steps down from standard Drop A. Used by Black Tongue, Northlane on "Eclipse" and "Dark Solitaire" (D-G-D-G-C-E-A), Spiritbox on "Yellowjacket" and Invent, Animate on their song "Elysium" from their album "Heavener", and Meshuggah on the song "Obsidian" from the original recording of Nothing (D-A-D-G-c-f-a).
- Drop C1♯/Drop D1♭ – D♭-A♭-D♭-G♭-B-E♭-A♭ / C♯-G♯-C♯-F♯-B-D♯-G♯
  Four full steps down from standard Drop A.
- Drop C1 – C-G-C-F-A♯-D-G / C-G-C-F-B♭-D-G
  Four and one half steps down from standard Drop A. Used by Within the Ruins on the album Phenomena (C-F-c-f-A♯-D-G).
- Drop B0 – B-F♯-B-E-A-C♯-F♯ / B-G♭-B-E-A-D♭-G♭
  Five full steps down from standard Drop A. One octave down from a baritone Drop B guitar.
- Drop A♯/Drop B♭ – A♯-F-A♯-D♯-G♯-C-F / B♭-F-B♭-E♭-A♭-C-F
  Five and one half steps down from standard Drop A.
- Drop A0 tuning – A-E-A-D-G-B-E
  Six full steps (one octave) down from standard Drop A.
- Drop G♯0 tuning – G♯-D♯-G♯-C♯-F♯-A♯-D♯
  (One octave below drop G♯). Used by deathcore band Anzu.
- Drop D 7-string tuning – D-D-A-d-g-b-e'
  This is the standard seven-string tuning with the low B string raised to D and lower E string dropped to D. The Drop C variation of this tuning (C-C-G-C-F-A-D) was used by James Hetfield of Metallica on a 7-String Guitar for "Some Kind Of Monster" from the album St. Anger.
- Drop D + B 7-string tuning – B'-D-A-d-g-b-e'
  Standard seven-string tuning with the low E dropped to D, which results in a minor 3rd interval between the two lowest strings of B and D. Used by Ed Sloan of Crossfade. Also used by Animals as Leaders on the song "CAFO". Periphery uses this tuning half a step down on the song "Racecar".
- Drop D + A 7-string tuning – A'-D-A-d-g-b-e'
  Seven-string tuning with the low E string dropped to D and a low A added below. Used extensively by Dir En Grey since the album "Dum Spiro Spero" as well as the song "Obscure" from the album Vulgar. Also used by Stam1na.
- G + A♯ Standard – G-A♯-D♯-G♯-C♯-F-A♯
  6 string A♯ Standard tuning with a low G on the bottom. Used by Crystal Lake since 2015.
- F♯ + D♯ Standard – F♯-D♯-G♯-C♯-F♯-A♯-D♯ 6 string D♯ Standard tuning with a low F♯ on the bottom. Used by Periphery on "Ragnarok".
- Alternate Drop A0 Tuning - A-D-A-D-G-E-E
  6 string Drop D with an low A but an octave lower with the high B string tuned to the same E as the 1st string. Used by Admiral Angry where they took 5 string bass guitars and converted them into 7 string guitars.

=== Eight-string ===
A continuation of the seven-string guitar, the eight-string guitar adds another string a perfect fourth lower than the low B of the seven-string guitar. This additional low F♯ string is only a whole step up from a bass guitar's low E string.

- Standard 8-string tuning F♯'-B'-E-A-D-G-B-E'
  Standard eight-string tuning. Used by Scar Symmetry on the song "The Three-Dimensional Shadow" from the album Holographic Universe (album) and "Mechanical Soul Cybernetics" from the album Dark Matter Dimensions, Deftones on Diamond Eyes and some songs from Ohms, Periphery, Dream Theater on "Awaken the Master" and "In the Arms of Morpheus", The Acacia Strain on the song "Unabomber", Volumes (band), Fear Factory on some songs and by Devil You Know on some songs.

==== Lower ====
- F tuning – F'-B♭'-E♭-A♭-d♭-g♭-b♭-e♭'
  Half a step down from standard tuning. Used famously by Meshuggah, as well as After The Burial, Butcher Babies, and Carnifex on some songs.
- F + Drop A♭– F'-A♭'-E♭-A♭-d♭-g♭-b♭-e♭' F Standard with the low B♭string dropped to A♭. Used by Galactic Pegasus (mostly on the "Pariah" EP), and After the Burial occasionally in the studio and live while playing songs in Drop A♭.
- E tuning – E'-A'-D-G-c-f-a-d'
  One full step down from standard tuning. Used by Meshuggah on some songs and Munky of Korn on some songs from their Untitled and The Path of Totality albums.
- E♭ tuning- E♭'-A♭'-D♭-G♭-B-e-a♭-d♭'
  One and a half steps down from standard tuning. Used by Meshuggah on "Nebulous" from the re-recording of Nothing, and Dissipate on their Tectonics EP.
- D tuning – D'-G'-C-F-a♯-d♯-g-c'
  Two full steps down from standard tuning.
- D♭ tuning – D♭'-G♭'-B-E-a-d-g♭-b'
  Two and a half steps down from standard tuning.

==== Higher ====
- High A tuning – B'-E-A-d-g-b-e'-a'
  Standard seven string tuning with a 'high a'. First used by classical guitarist Paul Galbraith as the tuning for his experimental Brahms guitar. Later adopted for electric guitar use by Rusty Cooley.
- All fourths tuning – F♯'-B'-E-A-d-g-c'-f'
  Regular tuning which extends range a half step higher.
- Drop F♯ 8-string tuning – F♯-C♯-F♯-B-E-A-C♯-F♯ A tuning which imitates 7-string Drop F♯ tuning, but with an additional high F♯. Used by bands such as Volumes (F♯-C♯-F♯-B-E-G♯-C♯-F♯).
- Drop F 8-string tuning – F-C-F-A♯-D♯-G♯-C-F A tuning combining 7-string Drop F, with a high F string. Used by bands such as The Acacia Strain, Carnifex, Aversions Crown, and Monuments (F-A♯-F-A♯-D♯-F-A♯-D♯).

==== Dropped ====
- Drop E 8-string tuning – E-B-E-A-D-G-B-E
  A combination of standard 7-string tuning and the 8th string dropped one full step from F♯ to E. Allows to play in the range of a standard bass, as well as one-finger power chords. Used by Animals as Leaders on most songs, Whitechapel on the songs "Devolver" and "Breeding Violence" from A New Era of Corruption, Deftones on Koi No Yokan and Gore, Allegaeon, and Emmure on the song "N.I.A. (News in Arizona)". An open variation of this tuning is used by Hacktivist with 3rd and 4th strings tuned a whole step up to A and E respectively (E-B-E-A-E-A-B-E). Also used by Born of Osiris on the songs "Silence the Echo" and "Crossface", Chelsea Grin on more recent material and by Carcosa. Fractalize also used this tuning on "Visions" from the Phophet Of Despair EP and "Sightless" from the Immersion album.
- Drop A + E 8-string tuning – E-A-E-A-D-G-B-E
  A combination of 7-string drop A tuning and an 8th string dropped one full step from F♯ to E, allowing both power chords rooted on A, and easy fingering with the E a fourth below. This is the tuning of the lowest two strings of a bass, along with all strings of a standard 6-string guitar in standard tuning. It is used by Rings of Saturn on the album Lugal Ki En and Mick Gordon on much of his work on the DOOM and DOOM Eternal soundtracks, notably Rip And Tear, BFG Division and Meathook.
- Alternatively, E-A-E-A-D-F♯-B-E
  A variation on Drop E, A with the G flattened one half step to F♯; this tuning is identical to 6-string Drop A, with two E strings added: one above, and one below. Like Drop E + A; this tuning allows easy fingering on the E since it is a standard fourth interval below the A. It also provides three high strings a fourth apart instead of the usual two. The tuning is used by Infant Annihilator on their albums The Elysian Grandeval Galèriarch and The Battle of Yaldabaoth.
- Drop E♭/D♯ 8-string tuning – E♭-B♭-E♭-A♭-D♭-G♭-B♭-E♭
  Half a step down from drop E tuning. Used by Meshuggah on "Shed" from the album Catch Thirtythree. Also used by Emmure in the album Speaker of the Dead in the song "Word of Intulo". After the Burial used this tuning on the songs "To Carry You Away", the remastered version of "Fingers Like Daggers", and "To Challenge Existence". The band Ion Dissonance used a variation of this tuning (D♯-G♯-C♯-F♯-C♯-F♯-A♯-D♯) from Cursed onwards. The slam/brutal death metal band Devourment uses the tuning starting from the album Obscene Majesty.
- Drop E♭/D♯ + A♭/G♯ – E♭-A♭-E♭-A♭-D♭-G♭-B♭-E♭A combination of 7-string drop A♭/ G♯ tuning and an 8th string dropped one full step from F to E♭/ D♯. Used by Meshuggah on some songs from Immutable.
- Drop D 8-string tuning – D-A-D-G-C-F-A-D
  One full step down from drop E. Used by Issues in the song "Tapping Out", Reflections on the "Willow" album, Enterprise Earth, Meshuggah on the song "Obsidian" from the re-recording of Nothing, along with some altered variations of the tuning and Mick Gordon on few tracks of the DOOM Eternal soundtrack.
- Drop D 8-string tuning (Variation) – D-A-D-A-D-G-B-E
  Equivalent to a 6-string Drop D tuning with an additional low A on the 7th string and a low D on the 8th string. Allows to play stacked fifths. Has been used by American deathcore band Enterprise Earth.
- Drop D + G (variation) D-G-D-G-C-E-A-D Combination of 6-string Drop G, with two D strings added: one above, and one below. Used by industrial and djent composer E.M.M.P.
- Drop C♯ 8-string tuning – C♯-G♯-C♯-F♯-B-E-G♯-C♯
  One and a half steps down from drop E. Used by Enox, Issues on the song "Downfall", Fractalize on "Prophet Of Despair", "Void" and most of the Immersion album. Although they use an altered version of the tuning to utilize the dissonant voicings (C♯-G♯-C♯-F♯-B-E-G♯-A). Galactic Pegasus on "Rhetoric". A variant of this tuning is also used by Distinguisher on most of their songs, as well as IAMONE (C♯-F♯-C♯-F♯-B-E-G♯-C♯).
- Drop C 8-string tuning – C-G-C-F-A♯-D♯-G-C
  Two full steps down from Drop E. Used by bands like Bound In Fear, Distant on some songs from the Aeons of Oblivion album, False Images, Black Tongue on their album Nadir, Skyburial, Vyletongue, Terror District, Lowlife, and Instill Terror.
- Drop C♯ + A 8-string tuning – C♯-A-E-A-D-G-B-E Standard 8-string tuning with the 8th string dropped 5 half steps from F♯ to C♯ and the 7th string dropped one full step from B to A. this tuning is used by Animals as Leaders on the songs "New Eden" and "Physical Education" using a guitar with two extra frets on the 8th and the 7th string. Also used by Kevin Sherwood on his songs Pareidolia and Coming Home.
- Drop C♯ + B 8-string tuning – C♯-B-E-A-D-G-B-E Standard 8-string tuning with the 8th string dropped 5 half steps to C♯, Used by Periphery on "Hell Below."
- Drop E/Open Tuning - E-B-E-B-E-F♯-B-E
  3rd string half a step down. 4th & 5th strings a whole step up. Used by The Tony Danza Tapdance Extravaganza in Danza III and IIII.
- Drop A♯ + A♯ 8-string tuning – A♯-A♯-D♯-G♯-C♯-F♯-A♯-D♯F Standard 8-String tuning with the 8th string dropped another 7 half steps. Used by Meshuggah on "Spasm" from the re-recording of the album Nothing. The song was originally recorded on 7-string guitars tuned to A♯-A♯-D♯-G♯-c♯-f♯-a♯.
- Open D Tuning - D-A-D-A-D-F♯-A-D
  3rd string half a step down. The eighth and seventh string is tuned down two full steps, the sixth string is tuned down a full step. The fifth and fourth strings are left alone and the two highest strings are tuned down a full step. This tuning has been used by Dean Murphy in some of his songs.

=== Nine-string ===
A continuation of the eight-string guitar, the nine-string guitar adds a string lower or higher.

- Standard 9-string tuning – C♯-F♯-B-E-A-d-g-b-e'.
  Used by Mick Gordon for the Doom soundtrack, Animals As Leaders for Private Visions of the World, and Deftones on some songs from Ohms.

==== Lower ====
- C1 tuning – C-F-A♯-D♯-G♯-c♯-f♯-a♯-d♯
  One half step from standard tuning.
- B0 tuning – B-E-A-D-G-c-f-a-d
  One full step from standard tuning. Gives the range of a five-string electric bass as well as a 6-string guitar in D tuning.
- A♯0 Tuning -A♯-D♯-G♯-C♯-F♯-b-e-g♯-c♯
  A step and a half step from standard tuning.
- A0 Tuning — A-D-G-C-F-a♯-d♯-g-c
  Two whole steps down from standard 9-String tuning.

==== Higher ====
- High A – F♯-B-E-A-d-g-b-e'-a'

==== Dropped ====
- Drop E + B 9-string tuning – B-E-B-E-A-d-g-b-e
  Gives the range of a five-string electric bass as well as a seven-string electric guitar in standard tuning. Used by Rings of Saturn for their song The Husk and Andrew Baena on "How to Sink".
- Drop B 9-string tuning – B-F♯-B-E-A-d-g-b-e
  9-string guitar in standard tuning with the lowest string dropped two half steps down to B0, the same note as on the lowest string of a 5-string electric bass. Used by Rob Scallon for his song Rogue and Andrew Baena on some songs such as "Massassi". Fractalize used this tuning on "Fault Lines" from the Immersion album, although they recorded it on 8-String Guitars.
- Double Drop A♯ - A♯-F-A♯-D♯-G♯-c♯-f♯-a♯-d♯
  9 String Standard down a half step and then drop tuned from C to A♯0. A variation of this tuning is used by Fractalize on the song "Instant" from the Immersion, but they use 8-String Guitars. The tuning used on the song is A♯-E-A♯-D♯-G♯-c♯-f-f♯.
- Double Drop A – A-E-A-E-A-d-g-b-e
  This is the 7-string drop A tuning with another E and A string added one octave lower. Used by Rings of Saturn, and "Akuma" by Galactic Pegasus. This tuning is also used by Fractalize on the songs "Suneater" on the Prophets Of Despair EP and on "Fragment" on the Immersion album. They use 8-String Guitars.
- Drop A 9-string tuning – A-E-A-D-G-c-f-a-d
  Standard 9-string tuning tuned one whole step down, and the lowest string dropped another whole step. A variant of this tuning is used by Josh Travis of Emmure (A-D-A-D-C(+16♯)-C-G-G♯-E). Mick Gordon also uses this tuning on the DOOM 2016 soundtrack for a couple tracks, notably "Flesh and Metal" (A-D-A-D-A-D-G-B-E). also a variation used by deathcore band nitheful (A-E-A-D-A-D-G-B-E) on their most recent album release creation ov god. Also used by Andrew Baena on his video "What If Djent 2019 Tuned Down" (A-D-A-D-G-C-F-A-D).
- Double Drop G♯ - G♯-D♯-G♯-C♯-F♯-b-e-g♯-c♯
  Used by the band Carthage on their song "Years And Darkness", from their 2012 album "Salt The Earth".
- Double Drop G — G-D-G-C-F-a♯-d♯-g-c An alternate version was used by Andrew Baena on the video "What If Djent 2019 Tuned Down" (G-C-G-C-F-a♯-d♯-g-c.) He used a pitch shifter on his 9-String Guitar which was tuned to A-D-A-D-G-C-F-A-D.
- Drop F 9-string tuning – F-C-F-A♯-D♯-g♯-c♯-f-a♯
  Used by deathcore band Anzu.
- Drop F Variation — F-C-F-C-F-a♯-d♯-g-c This tuning is exactly like the previously mentioned A-E-A-E-A-D-G-B-E tuning but 2 whole steps lower. Used by the Vocaloid metal band One Minute Winter.

==== Other ====
- After The Burial 9-string tuning – C♯-F-A♯-D♯-G♯-c♯-f♯-a♯-d♯
  Standard 9-string tuning with the top 8 strings down a half step, Used by After The Burial on some songs.
- Joshua Travis 9-string tuning – A-D-A-D-C(+16♯)-C-G-Ab-Eb Used by Glass Cloud on The Royal Thousand and by Emmure on various songs from Look at Yourself and Hindsight.

=== Ten-string ===
As a classical instrument introduced by Narciso Yepes (ten-string classical guitar of Yepes), the ten-string guitar adds four sympathetic strings to the classical guitar.

- Yepes standard tuning – F♯–G♯–A♯–C–E–A–d–g–b–e'

As a continuation of the nine-string guitar, the ten-string guitar adds another lower or higher string to the standard tuning.

- Standard (continued 4ths) – G♯-C♯-F♯-B-E-A-d-g-b-e'
- G0 tuning – G-C-F-A♯-D♯-G♯-c♯-f♯-a♯-d♯
  One half step down from standard tuning.
- High A – C♯-F♯-B-E-A-d-g-b-e'-a'
- Drop F♯ 10-string tuning – F♯-C♯-F♯-B-E-A-d-g-b-e'
  10-string guitar in standard tuning with the lowest string dropped two steps from G♯ to F♯, which is a fourth lower than the low B string on a five-string bass.
- Double Drop B – B-F♯-B-E-G♯-e-a-d-g-b
  This tuning was used by the deathcore band When Blood Falls Down.
- Triple Drop C - C-G-C-B-E-A-d-g-b-e
  Also known as C0 tuning / Drop C0 tuning, it uses the standard tuning of a 7-string guitar with the 8th, 9th and 10th string dropped by 4 steps from double drop E. Due the very low tuning the bottom strings require very heavy strings.
- Standard bass plus standard guitar – Standard E-A-D-g-b-e tuning for the top six strings and standard E'-A'-G-D bass tuning for the bottom four strings. It is set as a factory tuning for the Agile Septor 1030.
- Coma Cluster Void tuning – C-F♯-G-E-F-B-C-G♯-C♯-D'
  An extremely dissonant tuning used by the band Coma Cluster Void.
- Double EADGC - E0-A0-D1-G1-C2-E2-A2-D3-G3-C4 Two octaves lower than E standard. Used by avantgarde metal project E.M.M.P.

=== Eighteen-string ===
A special extended range electric guitar made by Ormsby Guitars for Jared Dines for the Djent 2018 event, as of today it is the only guitar of its kind.

- Jared Dines tuning – E-D♯-C♯F♯-B-E-D♯-G♯-C♯-F♯-B-E-A-d-g-b-e'-a'
  The first bottom strings use the regular standard tuning of a 10 strings guitar starting from the 2nd string to the 11th, with the first string tuned to A

=== Steel guitar ===
On pedal steel guitar, the most common tunings on double-neck instruments are the extended-chord C6 tuning and E9 tuning, sometimes known as the Texas and Nashville tunings respectively. On a double-neck instrument, the neck nearest the player will normally be some form of C6, and the furthest neck E9.

Necks with 12 or more strings can be used with universal tunings which combine the features of C6 and E9. On a 12-string pedal steel guitar, all 12 strings are tuned and played individually, not as six double courses as on the 12-string guitar.

On a lap steel guitar there may be up to four necks, each tuned differently. The C6 tuning was a common tuning for a six-string lap steel in the 1920s and 1930s. Tunings with a sixth interval are popular in Western swing and jazz, while tunings containing sevenths are often chosen for blues and rock music.
