= C tuning (guitar) =

Type of guitar tuning

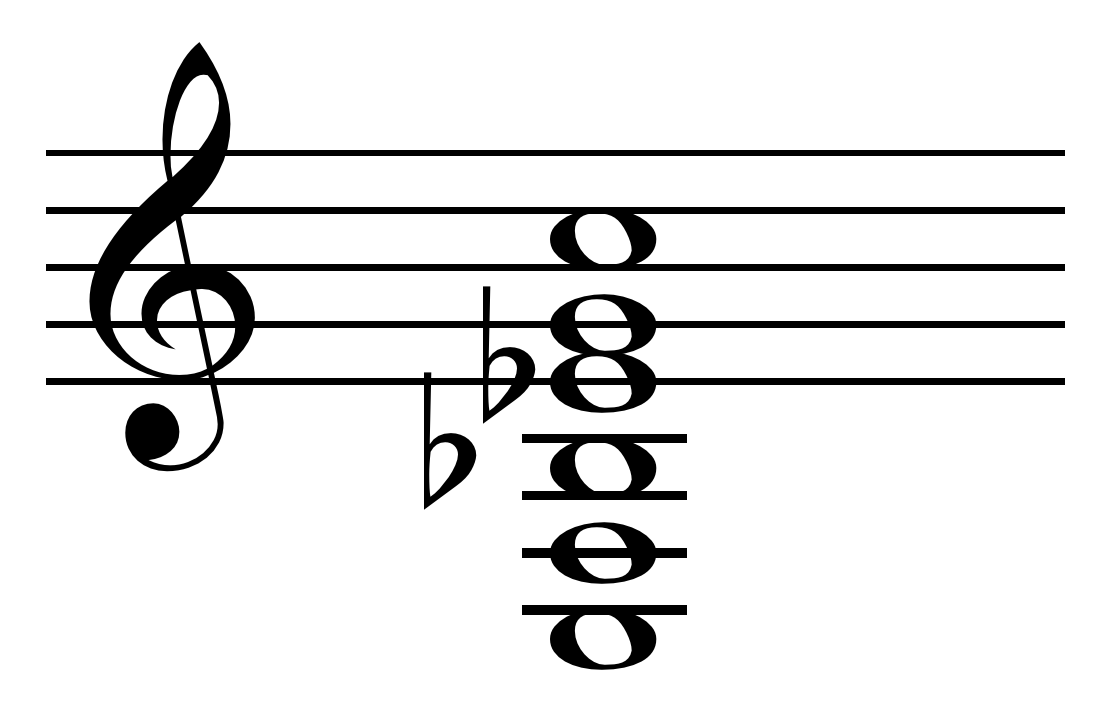
C tuning.

C standard tuning is a type of guitar tuning. The strings of the guitar are tuned two whole steps lower than standard tuning. The resulting notes can be described most commonly as C-F-A♯-D♯-G-C or C-F-B♭-E♭-G-C. This is not to be confused with C♯ tuning, which is one and one half steps lower than standard tuning.

The tuning is commonly used by heavy metal and hard rock artists on electric guitars to achieve a heavier and deeper sound. Slackening regular strings on a regular guitar to a lower pitch makes bending easier. Depending on personal playing style, some guitarists find this desirable, while others switch to heavier-gauge strings to avoid unintentional bending and to play chords in tune more easily. Another option is the baritone guitar, which is built slightly longer and stronger than a regular guitar to achieve the desired pitch with heavy strings at average tensions.

== See also ==
- List of guitar tunings
- Guitar tunings
