= Overtones tuning =

Tuning for a guitar

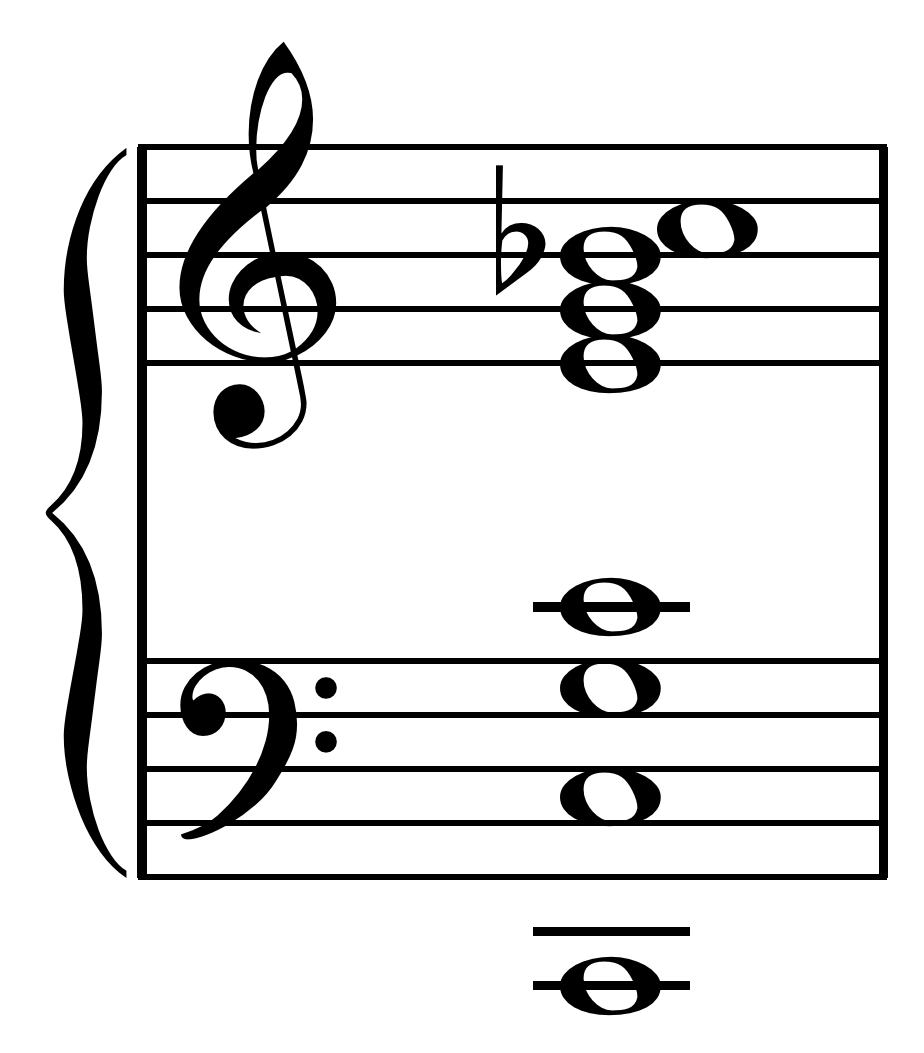
Overtones tunings for guitar select their six open-notes from the initial nine partials (harmonics) of the overtones sequence. The first eight partials on C, (C,C,G,C,E,G,B♭,C), are pictured.

Among alternative tunings for the guitar, an overtones tuning selects its open-string notes from the overtone sequence of a fundamental note. An example is the open tuning constituted by the first six overtones of the fundamental note C, namely C_{2}-C_{3}-G_{3}-C_{4}-E_{4}-G_{4}.

Overtone tunings that are open tunings have been used in songs by folk musician Joni Mitchell and by rock guitarist Mick Ralphs of Bad Company; these open overtones-tunings select their open notes from the first six partials of their overtone sequence on C or G. For open tunings, the open strings and the frets are each associated with a major-chord, which is played by strumming the open strings or the strings after they have been barred at one fret with one finger, greatly simplifying major-chord playing. For each such open or barred chord, the overtones reinforce the bass note, increasing the guitar's volume of sound and resonance. In an open overtones-tuning, adjacent strings that differ by a third interval can be tuned in just intonation, resulting in greater consonance than thirds in equal temperament.

Music theorist William Sethares has discussed an overtones tuning that uses six higher partials, from fourth to ninth, of the overtone sequence; his tuning is not an open tuning.

== Sequence of overtones ==
A vibrating string generates a sequence of harmonics, each of which represents an equilibrium for the string.

When an open-note C-string is struck, its overtones sequence begins with the notes (C,C,G,C,E,G,B♭,C). The root note is associated with a sequence of intervals, beginning with the unison interval (C,C), the octave interval (C,C), the perfect fifth (C,G), the perfect fourth (G,C), and the major third (C,E); in particular, this sequence of intervals contains the thirds of the C-major chord {(C,E),(E,G)}.

There are alternate ways to name the overtones in the sequence. For instance, instead of naming the overtones in terms of their immediate predecessor, like C in (G, C) being called the perfect fourth because it is a perfect fourth from G when G is considered the tonic, the C in (G, C) could be considered the second octave up from the fundamental (also a C pitch).

== Open tunings ==
The overtone sequence for a fundamental note is used by its open overtones-tunings.

For many open-tunings, the open-string notes constitute a major chord, often a major triad that repeats its notes in different octaves. Of course, repeating notes (or pitch classes) strengthen such notes, often the root or third of the chord. In comparison with standard tuning, each major-chord open-string tuning reinforces different "overtones and can actually make the guitar sound louder and more resonant". To explain this resonance and strengthened sound, the example of the overtones on C has been used; and C's overtones is a standard example for explaining the sequence of overtones.

The open-string notes form a C major chord, which is the triad (C,E,G) having the root note C, the major third (C,E), and the perfect fifth (C,G). When the guitar is strummed without fretting even one string, a C-major chord is sounded. By barring all of the strings for one fret (from one to eleven), one finger suffices to fret the other eleven major-chords.

=== Examples ===
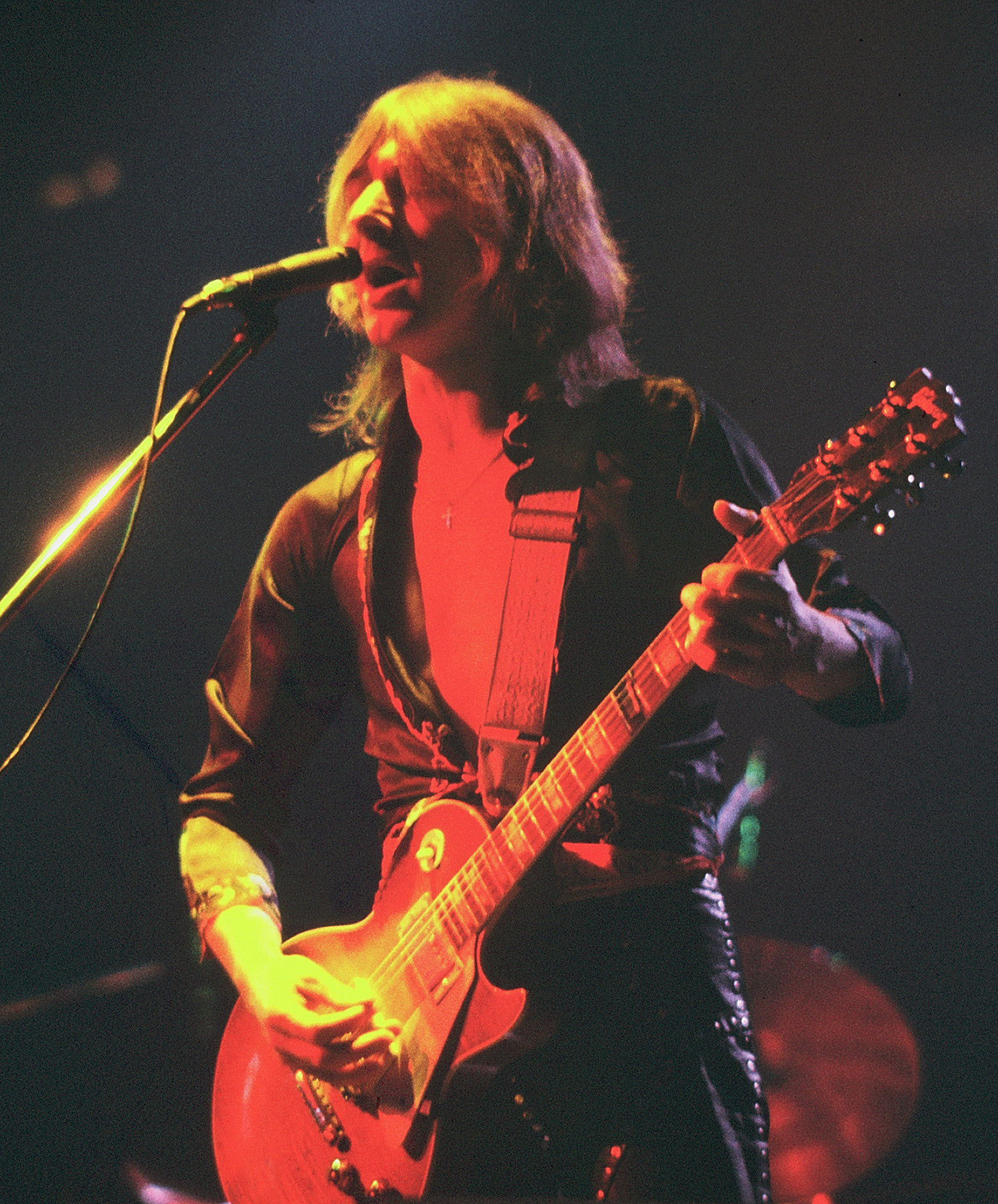
Mick Ralphs tuned his guitar to an open-C overtones-tuning for the Bad Company song "Can't Get Enough".

==== Open-C tuning: C-C-G-C-E-G ====
C-C-G-C-E-G

This open-C tuning uses the harmonic sequence (overtones) of the note C. When an open-note C-string is struck, its harmonic sequence begins with the notes (C,C,G,C,E,G,B♭,C). The root note is associated with a sequence of intervals, beginning with the unison interval (C,C), the octave interval (C,C), the perfect fifth (C,G), the perfect fourth (G,C), and the major third (C,E); in particular, this sequence of intervals contains the thirds of the C-major chord {(C,E),(E,G)}.

The open-string notes form a C major chord, which is the triad (C,E,G) having the root note C, the major third (C,E), and the perfect fifth (C,G). When the guitar is strummed without fretting even one string, a C-major chord is sounded. By barring all of the strings for one fret (from one to eleven), one finger suffices to fret the other eleven major-chords.

Flattening this open tuning's open-note E to E♭ changes the open chord from C-major to C-minor, so producing the cross-note tuning

C-C-E-G-E♭-G

which enables one-finger minor chords. Like other cross-note tunings, it also allows major chords to be fretted with one adjacent finger.

Many of the notes from the harmonic sequence for C appear in the new standard tuning (NST), which is used in Guitar Craft (a school of guitar playing founded by King Crimson's Robert Fripp). This open-C tuning has the same range as NST, which can use extreme strings (.011 and .059 inches).

===== C-C-G-C-E-C =====
Using a high C rather than the high G of the overtone-series, the open-C tuning

C-C-G-C-E-C

was used by Mick Ralphs for the songs "Can't Get Enough" and "Movin' On" on Bad Company's debut album. The lowest and second lowest C's differ by an octave; even when the lowest C-string is not struck, its sympathetic resonance improves the sound. Ralphs stated that "It needs the open C to have that ring" and that "it never really sounds right in standard tuning".

==== Open G tuning ====
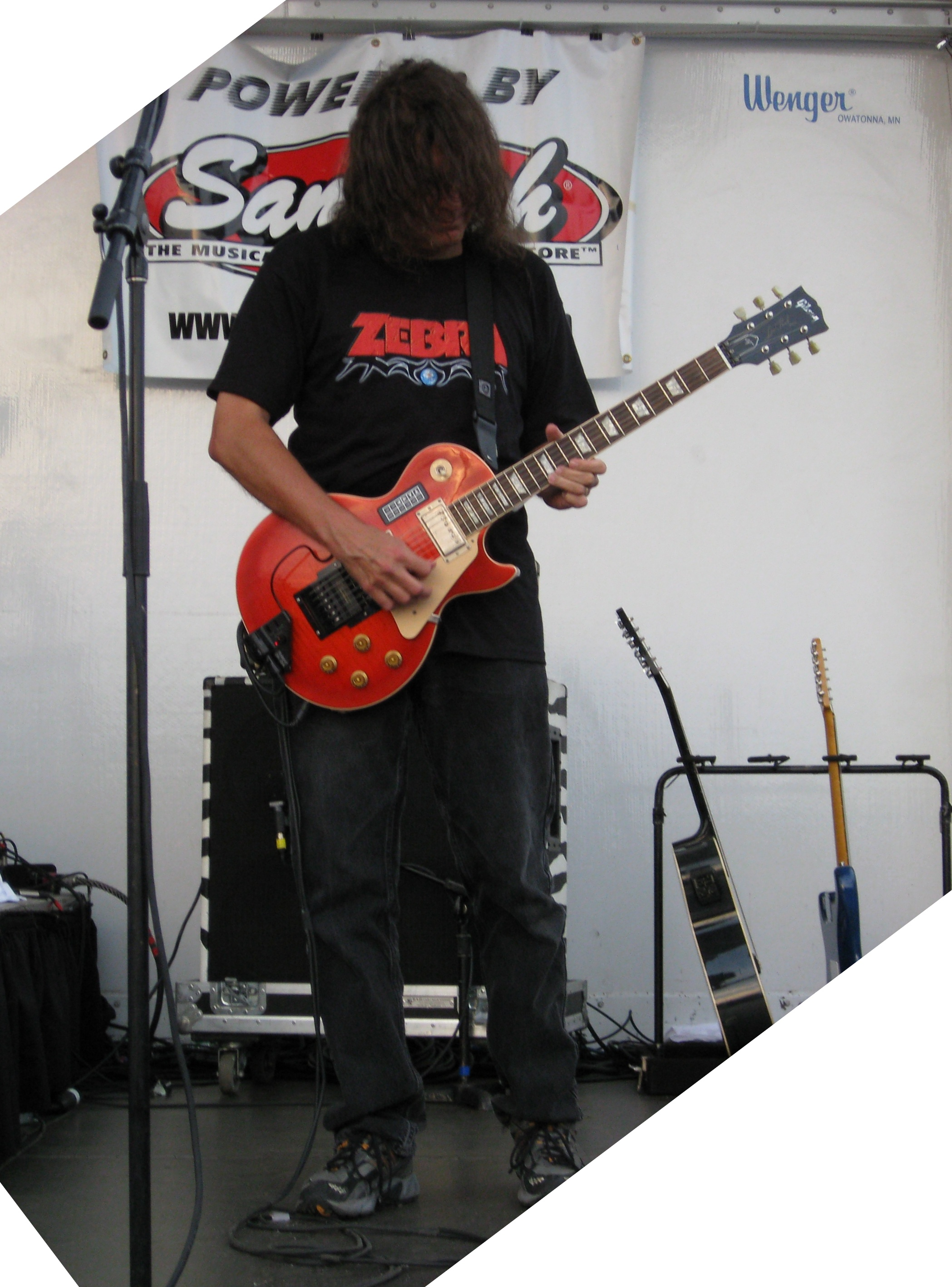
Zebra's Randy Jackson played "Who's Behind The Door?" using the open-G overtones-tuning.

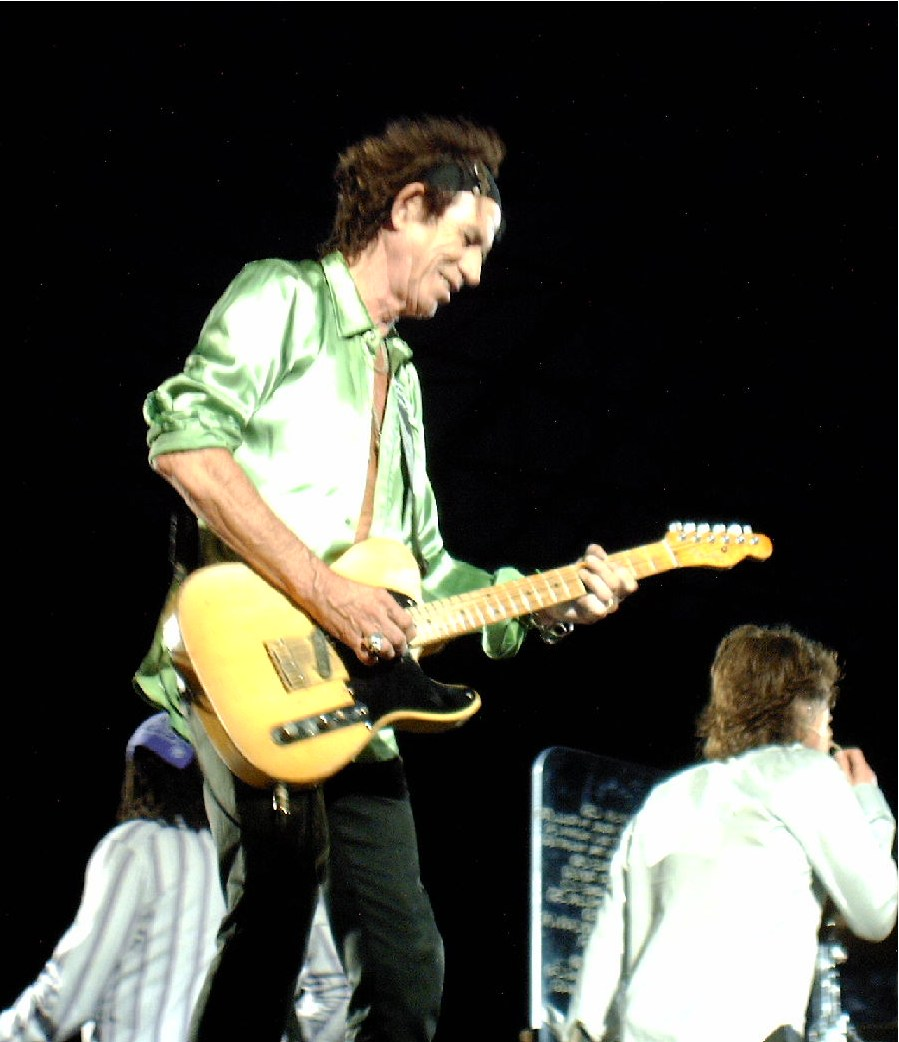
The Rolling Stones's Keith Richards plays a five-string Telecaster in open-G tuning.

G-G-D-G-B-D

This open G tuning was used by Zebra's Randy Jackson for "Who's Behind the Door?". Mick Ralphs used this open-G overtones-tuning for "Hey Hey" and while writing the demo of "Can't Get Enough". The open G tuning G-G-D-G-B-D was used by Joni Mitchell for For the Roses ("Electricity" and "For the Roses") and "Hunter (The Good Samaritan)". Truncating this tuning to G-D-G-B-D for his five-string guitar, Keith Richards plays this overtones-tuning on The Rolling Stones's "Honky Tonk Women", "Brown Sugar" and "Start Me Up".

=== Major-third interval in just intonation ===
In the open-G overtones-tuning G-G-D-G-B-D, the (G,B) interval is a major third, and of course each successive pair of notes on the G- and B-strings is also a major third; similarly, the open-string minor-third (B,D) induces minor thirds among all the frets of the B-D strings.

Of all the intervals in equal temperament, the thirds have the largest error in comparison to those of just intonation: Equal temperaments is used in modern music because it facilitates music in all keys, while (on a piano and other instruments) just intonation provided better-sounding major-third intervals for only a subset of keys. "Sonny Landreth, Keith Richards and other open-G masters often lower the second string slightly so the major third is in tune with the overtone series. This adjustment dials out the dissonance, and makes those big one-finger major-chords come alive."

Relative to the "pure" thirds in the overtone series, equal-temperament widens the major third by an all-too audible 14 cents, and it narrows the minor third by an even more horrifying 16 cents (1 cent is one hundredth (1 percent) of a semitone). So, the 3 note (F#) of a D-major chord, and the b3 note (F) of a D-minor chord, may well sound a lot better / more pleasing to the ear if they are adjusted downward or upward, respectively. Unfortunately, making such an adjustment in standard tuning – and in most other tunings – is inadmissible, because it's not possible to tune the notes sounded on a particular string individually; adjusting the intonation of a string affects the intonation of all of the notes which lie "under" it ... some of which will be the 1, 4, and 5 notes of other chords. Since these notes are not displaced (or are only slightly displaced) by even-temperament, any adjustment to "improve" the intonation of a 3 note in one chord will just throw other chords badly out-of-tune. Our "open" tunings (ones whose open strings form a simple chord) are the one exception to this rule. To the extent that we play with a slide (like the Delta blues players) or with one barred finger or some other grip (Keith Richards) that is essentially just moved up and down the neck, ... then the 3 of the chord can be tuned more or less "pure", as in the holy overtone series. In open-G tuning (G,G,D,G,B,D), the 3 (B) of the open-G major-triad is on string 2. If we barre or use a slide to play the IV chord (C) at fret 5, the 3 of that chord (E) is still on string 2 ... as it will be when we slide up to the V chord, or the bVII chord, or the octave. As long as we don't wantonly introduce other chord shapes, our adjustment to string 2 won't break anything. If we're playing with a slide, this is more or less guaranteed.

— Warren Allen

== Higher partials ==
C-E-G-B♭-C-D

William Sethares described an overtones tuning that contains the fourth to ninth partials, omitting the first three partials (notes of the sequence of overtones) Its open notes do not form a major chord.

The higher partials, particularly B♭, are poorly approximated by notes using equal temperament: "Our tempered aural thinking can include tones up to the sixth partial but beyond that the point the aural perception is merely rational."
