= Six-string alto guitar =

Musical instrument

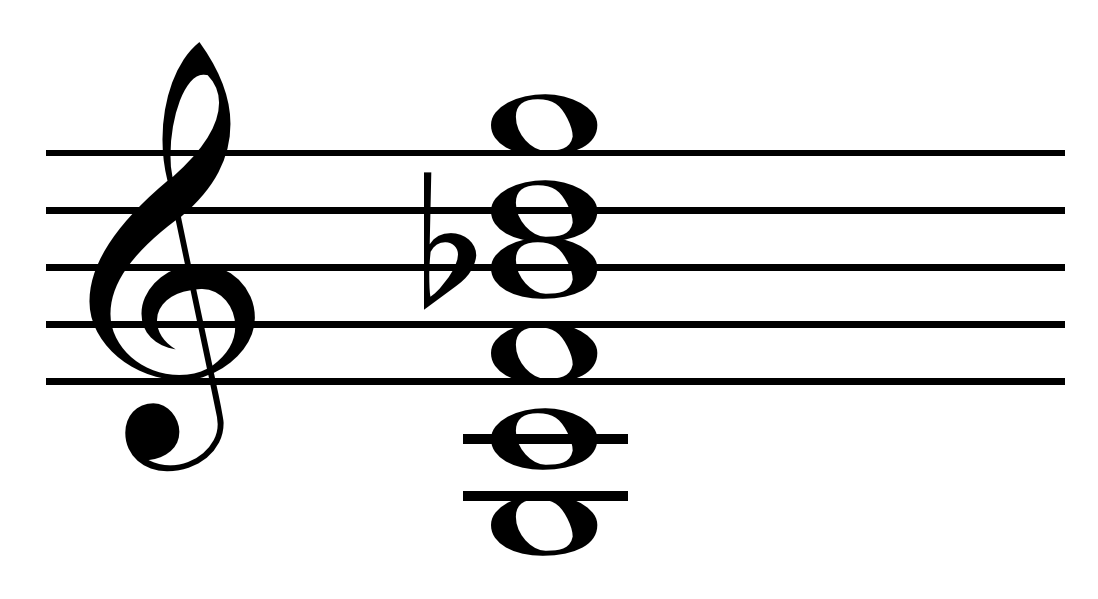
G tuning

The six-string alto guitar or G guitar is a smaller version of the classical guitar, designed to be fitted with lighter strings and tuned a perfect fifth higher, to B-E-A-D-F♯/G♭-B.

Terz guitar (Terz meaning third) refers to either a small sized classical guitar or to the practice of tuning a standard guitar a minor third higher than standard guitar tuning (as though a capo were on the third fret of the guitar). The scale length is generally 530 mm (20.8 inches), though sometimes as long as 560 mm (22 inches). Mauro Giuliani and Caspar Joseph Mertz wrote extensively for the terz guitar as a complement to the prime (standard) guitar. Acceptable alternate spellings for terz include tierce, third, and tertz.

Strings makers now produce strings that allow terz guitar tuning on standard scale length guitars at normal string tension.

At the 2018 NAMM Show, Reverend Guitars launched an electric Terz guitar in production along with Billy Corgan.

== Literature ==
- Rainer Stelle: 100 Jahre Musizieren mit Terz-, Prim- und Quintbassgitarre in Deutschland, in: Auftakt! No. 4/2015, p. 43–45 (Fachzeitschrift des Bundes Deutscher Zupfmusiker e. V.)
