= Gidim (album) =

Studio album by Rings of Saturn
- Released: October 25, 2019
- Studio: Mann Studios; Audiohammer Studio
- Genre: Deathcore; technical death metal
- Length: 44:39
- Label: Nuclear Blast
- Producer: Mark Lewis

Rings of Saturn chronology
Ultu Ulla (2017)	Gidim (2019)	Rings of Saturn (2022)

Singles from Gidim
- 1. "The Husk" Released: August 30, 2019; 2. "Mental Prolapse" Released: September 20, 2019

Gidim is the fifth studio album by American deathcore band Rings of Saturn. It was released on October 25, 2019, through Nuclear Blast. The album features the return of Dingir and Lugal Ki En guitarist Joel Omans According to figures provided by MetalInsider, the album sold 4,850 units in its first week. The album debuted at #22 on the Billboard Top Current Albums chart.

Artwork for the album was provided by Mark Cooper, who had worked with the band on their prior three albums.

This is the band's final album to feature lead vocalist Ian Bearer as the band announced on May 14, 2021, they were moving to a strictly instrumental focused sound.

== Background and promotion ==
On May 29, 2018, the band announced the departure of guitarist Miles Dimitri Baker and drummer Aaron Stechauner, who both joined in 2014 prior to the release of Ultu Ulla. They announced the return of guitarist Joel Omans, who had played guitar for the band on Dingir and Lugal Ki En, along with Yo Onityan, formerly of DeGrace. The band also announced that Mike Caputo of Desecrate the Faith would be joining the band to play drums for their upcoming dates on Ragefest.

They went on to state that their upcoming release would get back to the band's roots, and that the album would feature guest segments and instrumentals by Charles Caswell of Berried Alive, Yo Onityan, Marco Pitruzzella, and vocalist Dan Watson, of Enterprise Earth and Infant Annihilator. Baker and Stechauner would post statements of their own, citing lack of credit in song writing for Ultu Ulla as their primary reason for departing the band.

Nuclear Blast announced the album on August 30, 2019, alongside the album's first promotional single "The Husk," for which a music video was directed by Scott Hansen of Digital Thunderdome. Five days later, We Are the End, a band Mann and Baker had previously worked with, accused Mann of stealing their guitarist's riffs for the song.

A second promotional single, "Mental Prolapse," was released on September 20 of the same year.

To promote the album, the band embarked on The Gidim Release Tour 2019 with support from Enterprise Earth, Angelmaker, and Brand of Sacrifice on October 16.

Professional ratings
Review scores
Source	Rating
Distorted Sound	8.0/10

== Track listing ==
All lyrics are written by Ian Bearer; all music is composed by Lucas Mann and Joel Omans.

No.	Title	Length
1.	"Pustules" (featuring Charles Caswell)	4:30
2.	"Divine Authority"	3:32
3.	"Hypodermis Glitch" (featuring Dan Watson)	4:28
4.	"Bloated and Stiff"	4:37
5.	"Tormented Consciousness" (featuring Yo Onityan)	5:02
6.	"The Husk"	4:57
7.	"Mental Prolapse"	4:34
8.	"Genetic Inheritance"	3:56
9.	"Face of the Wormhole"	3:42
10.	"Gidim" (instrumental)	5:22
Total length:		44:39

== Personnel ==
Rings of Saturn

- Ian Bearer – vocals, composition
- Lucas Mann – guitars, bass, keyboards, synthesizers, programming, composition, arrangement
- Joel Omans – guitars, bass

Additional musicians

- Marco Pitruzella – drums
- Charles Caswell – guest guitar solo on "Pustules"
- Dan Watson – guest vocals on "Hypodermis Glitch"
- Yo Onityan – guest guitar solo on "Tormented Consciousness"

Additional personnel

- Mark Lewis – production, mixing, mastering, vocal tracking
- Mark Cooper – artwork, layout

== Charts ==
Chart (2019)	Peak position
US Top Hard Rock Albums (Billboard)	10
US Top Album Sales (Billboard)	23
US Independent Albums (Billboard)	6
US Top Rock Albums (Billboard)	38
