= The Elysian Grandeval Galèriarch =

Studio album by Infant Annihilator
- Released: 29 July 2016
- Recorded: 2016; instruments recorded in Hull, East Yorkshire; vocals recorded at Kirkbride Recordings in Cape Coral, Florida
- Genres: Deathcore, technical death metal
- Length: 58:38
- Label: Self-released
- Producer: Jesse Kirkbride

Infant Annihilator chronology
| The Palpable Leprosy of Pollution (2012) | The Elysian Grandeval Galèriarch (2016) | The Battle of Yaldabaoth (2019) |

Singles from The Elysian Grandeval Galèriarch
- 1. "Soil the Stillborn" Released: 6 June 2016; 2. "Motherless Miscarriage" Released: 22 June 2016; 3. "Blasphemian" Released: 28 February 2017

The Elysian Grandeval Galèriarch (abbreviated as The EGG) is the second studio album by the English deathcore band Infant Annihilator. It was self-released 29 July 2016. The album is Infant Annihilator's first album to feature vocalist Dickie Allen, ending the hiatus in musical activity after former vocalist Dan Watson's departure from the band in 2013.

The album is Infant Annihilator's first album to chart, making it onto several Billboard charts, including the Top Heatseekers, Independent Albums, Top Album Sales, Top Rock Albums, and Top Hard Rock Albums charts.

== Background ==
=== History ===
In late 2013, Infant Annihilator vocalist Dan Watson resigned from the band. They were in the process of writing their second album and had almost finished writing the nearly 18-minute song "Behold the Kingdom of the Wretched Undying", but after Watson's departure, writing for a new album came to a halt. A year later, in late 2014—while he was playing for fellow UK band Desolated during their first US tour—drummer Aaron Kitcher met US vocalist Dickie Allen in person for the first time. The tour line-up included the band Traitors, who had brought Allen—a friend of the band—along with them on the tour. Hearing Allen's vocals in person convinced Kitcher that he was a good fit for Infant Annihilator, prompting them to recruit him as their new vocalist.

With a new vocalist, Infant Annihilator resumed writing for their second album, teasing on social media that they were still active. They eventually revealed that they had acquired a new vocalist and were working on a new album. They also released a lyric video and a guitar play-through video for "Soil the Stillborn", vocal recording session updates, and the music video for "Motherless Miscarriage" on their YouTube channel to promote the album.

=== Recording ===
The process of writing and recording for The Elysian Grandeval Galèriarch was different than it had been for their previous album The Palpable Leprosy of Pollution. Previously, Kitcher and guitarist Eddie Pickard had communicated with Watson exclusively via the internet, utilizing the typical internet band practice of individual members being separated by distance when recording and exchanging ideas and files via the internet. For the previous album, the instrumentals were written and recorded by Kitcher and Pickard in England and the lyrics and vocals were written and recorded by Watson in the US, with the three of them never meeting in person.

In contrast, for the recording of The Elysian Grandeval Galèriarch, Kitcher and Pickard travelled to Kirkbride Recordings in Florida and stayed there for a month to record Allen's vocals, happy to be able to give direct input and ideas while recording (which they were unable to do with the previous album due to only communicating and exchanging files with Watson online). Allen wrote half of the lyrics, with Kitcher and Pickard tweaking them to fit the album's theme. Dillon Becker—former bassist of Traitors and current vocalist of AnimalFarm—also contributed to a large portion of the lyric-writing. Once the lyrics were finalized, the vocal recording process took two weeks to complete.

=== Album leak and release ===
The album was leaked approximately five days prior to its official release date, prompting Infant Annihilator to choose to upload the official album stream to YouTube four days early. The Elysian Grandeval Galèriarch was officially released 29 July 2016 and was their first album to chart, making it onto several Billboard charts, including the Top Heatseekers, Independent Albums, Top Album Sales, Top Rock Albums, and Top Hard Rock Albums charts.

== Music and lyrics ==
=== Lyrical themes and etymology ===
When asked of the origin and meaning of the album's title, drummer Aaron Kitcher said "To be perfectly honest, we just really wanted an album to have the abbreviation 'The EGG' haha. It took a good while to find a set of words that not only had that abbreviation, but also sounded good and made sense with the concept of the album. "Elysian" – celestial/divine; "Grandeval" – ancient ... "Galèriarch" ... a fusion of the word "galère" which means a group of undesirable people and the suffix "-arch" which changes the meaning to the leader of a group of undesirable people. So we have the celestial/divine ancient ruler of a group of undesirables. In this case the undesirables are a religious cult."

Kitcher went on to explain the theme behind the lyrics on the album: "The lyrics are pretty much summed up by the title—it's all about a line of divine leaders of this horrendous religious cult who gain power by committing the most vile acts possible, mainly on children/infants. The lyrics talk about how the first leader came about, how he started his cult and, of course, goes into graphic descriptions of the horrible acts that are committed."
Of the lyric writing thought process, Kitcher said "It’s kind of continuing on from the theme of the first album, but taking a step back and telling the bigger picture. The way that we went about writing the lyrics was with the mindset: 'if it is physically uncomfortable and sickening for us to write, then we are on the right track.'" Vocalist Dickie Allen said "... for the new Infant Annihilator album ... I was trying to be as vulgar as possible, keeping the same feel as the first album but honestly stepping it up a notch."

=== Musical style ===
The Elysian Grandeval Galèriarch is a deathcore album, and has been described by critics as having stylistic similarities to various other deathcore and death metal bands, including Cattle Decapitation, Rings of Saturn, Ingested, Acrania, Archspire, Annotations of an Autopsy, and Agoraphobic Nosebleed. Critics also noted some down-tempo influence stemming from Kitcher's and Pickard's other musical project, the down-tempo deathcore band Black Tongue.

== Reception ==
Professional ratings
Review scores
| Source | Rating |
|---|---|
| Dead Rhetoric | 4.5/10 stars |
| Distorted Sound Magazine | 8/10 stars |
| It Djents | 8.5/10 stars |
| Marunouchi Muzik Magazine | 10/10 stars |
| New-Transcendence | 10/10 stars |
| Sputnikmusic | 3.5/5 stars |
| Stormbringer.at | 5/5 stars |

The Elysian Grandeval Galèriarch was met with critical praise, with several critics giving it their maximum rating. A common note made among reviewers was the improvement and progression of Infant Annihilator's writing ability and the production quality of the album from that of their previous (debut) album The Palpable Leprosy of Pollution. The new vocalist Dickie Allen's diverse and eclectic vocal style was praised and also declared an improvement over the vocals on the previous album. David Creamer from Distorted Sound Magazine stated "... Dickie Allen ... makes Travis Ryan sound like a gospel singer." The length of the album, at almost an hour—longer than is typical in the genre—, as well as the length of the nearly 18-minute track "Behold the Kingdom of the Wretched Undying", was both praised and criticised by various critics.
Negative criticism was sparse, but Kyle McGinn of Dead Rhetoric had mostly neutral-negative opinions of the album, calling it "... a mess of speed and breakdowns ...", "Extreme for the sake of extreme ...", and "... too much to take in." Another negative opinion expressed by some critics was that at times the record was too repetitive and not memorable enough.

The style of the album was noted by several critics as being reminiscent in its technicality of fellow technical deathcore act Rings of Saturn, whose 2014 album Lugal Ki En had Kitcher performing the drums.

=== Pop culture ===
When YouTuber/musician Jared Dines gifted him a vinyl of the album signed by vocalist Dickie Allen, rapper Post Malone stated "This is my favorite vinyl that I have ... This record is super killer ..." On another occasion, Malone was seen wearing an Infant Annihilator T-shirt bearing the artwork from the album.

== Track listing ==
All lyrics are written by Dickie Allen and Dillon Becker; all music is composed by Aaron Kitcher and Eddie Pickard.

| No. | Title | Length |
|---|---|---|
| 1. | "Unholy Gravebirth" | 4:48 |
| 2. | "Crucifilth" | 4:55 |
| 3. | "Motherless Miscarriage" | 2:18 |
| 4. | "Baptised, Bastardised, Sodomised." | 4:23 |
| 5. | "Behold the Kingdom of the Wretched Undying" (featuring Tyler Shelton, Bryan Long, Dillon Becker & Chris Whited): I. "He, Who Dwells in Shadow"; II. "They, Who Hunt Beneath"; III. "He, Who Holds Dominion"; IV. "Rise, Monolithic Overlord" | 17:40 |
| 6. | "Soil the Stillborn" | 3:59 |
| 7. | "Paedophilic Ultimatum" | 1:10 |
| 8. | "Neutered in Utero" | 4:46 |
| 9. | "Pelt of Innocent Flesh" | 7:04 |
| 10. | "Blasphemian" | 7:24 |
| 11. | "Neonatalimpalionecrophiliation" (Instrumental) | 0:11 |
| Total length: | | 58:38 |

== Chart performance ==
The Elysian Grandeval Galèriarch was Infant Annihilator's first album to chart, making it onto several Billboard charts.

| Chart (2016) | Peak position |
|---|---|
| US Top Hard Rock Albums (Billboard) | 7 |
| US Top Rock Albums (Billboard) | 22 |
| US Top Album Sales (Billboard) | 90 |
| US Independent Albums (Billboard) | 14 |
| US Heatseekers Albums (Billboard) | 4 |

== Personnel ==
Infant Annihilator

- Dickie Allen – vocals, lyrics
- Eddie Pickard – guitar, bass
- Aaron Kitcher – drums

Art and film

- Scott Rudd – lyric video production ("Soil the Stillborn")
- Paper Jimsm'n – music video filming ("Motherless Miscarriage")
- Eddie Pickard – film editing ("Motherless Miscarriage")
- Aaron Kitcher – film editing ("Motherless Miscarriage")

Production

- Jesse Kirkbride – production, engineering, mixing, mastering

Additional credits

- Dillon Becker (AnimalFarm, Nitheful) – lyrics, additional vocals (track 5)
- Tyler Shelton (Traitors) – additional vocals (track 5)
- Bryan Long (Dealey Plaza, formerly of King Conquer) – additional vocals (track 5)
- Chris Whited (King Conquer) – additional vocals (track 5)
