= Suffer in Hell =

Studio album by Chelsea Grin
- Released: November 11, 2022
- Genre: Deathcore
- Length: 26:40
- Label: ONErpm
- Producer: Jeff Dunne; Zach Jones

Chelsea Grin chronology
Eternal Nightmare (2018)	Suffer in Hell (2022)	Suffer in Heaven (2023)

Singles from Suffer in Hell
- 1. "Origin of Sin" Released: August 12, 2022; 2. "The Isnis" Released: September 9, 2022; 3. "Forever Bloom" Released: October 21, 2022

Professional ratings
Review scores
Source	Rating
Boolin Tunes	9/10
New Transcendence	5/10
Sonic Perspectives	8.8/10
Wall of Sound	9/10

Suffer in Hell is the sixth studio album by American deathcore band Chelsea Grin. It was released on November 11, 2022. It is the first release from the band without drummer/co-vocalist Pablo Viveros since their 2012 EP Evolve; Viveros has been on hiatus from the band since 2021 and had made commitments with another artist in the downtime during COVID-19 pandemic to perform and tour. They revealed he was still a member of the band, but would continue to take a hiatus from the band to fulfill his commitments, with session member Nathan Pearson taking his place.

Suffer in Hell is the first part of a double album split as two separate releases, with the second part, Suffer in Heaven, released on March 17, 2023. Suffer in Hell was released to critical acclaim, with Boolin Tunes referring to it as "an absolute deathcore masterclass" and the band's "finest work to date." One of the tracks, "Forever Bloom" features a posthumous vocal appearance from the late Trevor Strnad of The Black Dahlia Murder.

== Track listing ==
All tracks are written by David Flinn, Stephen Rutishauser, Tom Barber, and Zach Jones.

Suffer in Hell track listing
No.	Title	Length
1.	"Origin of Sin"	4:26
2.	"Forever Bloom" (featuring Trevor Strnad of The Black Dahlia Murder)	2:50
3.	"Deathbed Companion"	3:54
4.	"Crystal Casket"	3:10
5.	"Flood Lungs"	3:25
6.	"The Isnis"	3:15
7.	"Mourning Hymn"	3:36
8.	"Suffer in Hell, Suffer in Heaven"	2:04
Total length:		26:40

== Personnel ==
Chelsea Grin

- Tom Barber – vocals
- Stephen Rutishauser – guitars
- David Flinn – bass

Additional musicians

- Nathan Pearson – drums
- Trevor Strnad – guest vocals on track 2

Additional personnel

- Jeff Dunne and Zach Jones – production
