= The Palpable Leprosy of Pollution =

Studio album by Infant Annihilator
- Released: 12 December 2012
- Genre: Deathcore
- Length: 50:37
- Label: Total Deathcore
- Producer: Infant Annihilator

Infant Annihilator chronology
The Palpable Leprosy of Pollution (2012)	The Elysian Grandeval Galèriarch (2016)

Singles from The Palpable Leprosy of Pollution
- 1. "Decapitation Fornication" Released: 11 October 2012

Professional ratings
Review scores
Source	Rating
New-Transcendence	9.75/10 stars
Sputnikmusic	2/5 stars

The Palpable Leprosy of Pollution is the debut studio album by the English deathcore band Infant Annihilator. It was released on 12 December 2012. The album is Infant Annihilator's only album to feature former vocalist Dan Watson, who departed from the band in 2013.

== Cover art ==
The album cover depicts a male child's torso as he grasps a wooden Christian cross whilst it is upside down and holds it to his chest.

== Track listing ==
All tracks are written by Infant Annihilator.

No.	Title	Length
1.	"New Born Porn"	1:00
2.	"I. Infant Annihilator"	2:53
3.	"Devotion to the Child Rape Syndicate"	3:14
4.	"II. Anal Prolapse Suffocation"	3:01
5.	"Whorespawn (Bloodline Defiled)"	3:11
6.	"III. Embryonic Fetish" (Featuring Alex Teyen of Black Tongue)	3:57
7.	"Immeasurable Foetal Mutilation"	3:37
8.	"Torn from the Womb"	4:07
9.	"Cuntcrusher"	4:59
10.	"Pinned Down and Fisted"	2:51
11.	"Flayed and Consumed" (Featuring Lucas Mann of Rings of Saturn)	2:53
12.	"Bathed In Placenta"	4:01
13.	"The Palpable Leprosy of Pollution" (Featuring Bill Williams)	3:11
14.	"Decapitation Fornication"	3:27
15.	"An Exhalation of Disease"	3:20
16.	"Paedophilic Supremacy" (Instrumental)	0:55
Total length:		50:37

== Personnel ==
Infant Annihilator

- Dan Watson – vocals, lyrics
- Eddie Pickard – guitar, bass
- Aaron Kitcher – drums
