= Eternal Nightmare =

Eternal Nightmare may refer to:

- Eternal Nightmare (Vio-lence album)
- Eternal Nightmare (Chelsea Grin album)
