= Self Inflicted =

Studio album by Chelsea Grin
- Released: July 1, 2016
- Genres: Metalcore; djent
- Length: 37:38
- Label: Rise
- Producer: Stephan Hawkes

Chelsea Grin chronology
Ashes to Ashes (2014)	Self Inflicted (2016)	Eternal Nightmare (2018)

Professional ratings
Review scores
Source	Rating
AllMusic	3.5/5 stars
Metal Hammer	2.5/5 stars

Self Inflicted is the fourth studio album by American deathcore band Chelsea Grin. The album debuted at number 105 on the Billboard 200. This is the band's last album to feature vocalist Alex Koehler and guitarists Jake Harmond and Dan Jones before their departures in 2017 and 2018. It also the first album to feature guitarist Stephen Rutishauser.

== Style ==
Allmusic noted that album contains almost no death metal elements that were present on the band's previous releases, noting that the album is a metalcore release. This album has also been described as djent, and that it uses djent playing styles.

== Release ==
Self inflicted was released on July 1, 2016 by Rise Records. The deluxe edition of Self Inflicted was released on January 27, 2017.

== Reception ==
Allmusic awarded the album three and a half stars out of five, noting that "Self Inflicted is as menacing and relentless as anything that Chelsea Grin has dropped thus far, a rage-fueled beatdown that's as technically sound as it is sonically punishing".

== Track listing ==
Tracks
No.	Title	Length
1.	"Welcome Back"	2:59
2.	"Four Horsemen"	3:06
3.	"Love Song"	3:07
4.	"Clickbait"	3:15
5.	"Skin Deep"	3:29
6.	"Scratching and Screaming"	3:24
7.	"Strung Out"	3:27
8.	"Broken Bonds"	3:44
9.	"Life Sentence"	3:13
10.	"Never, Forever"	4:00
11.	"Say Goodbye"	4:00
Total length:		37:38

iTunes Deluxe Edition bonus tracks (2017)
No.	Title	Length
12.	"American Dream"	3:18
13.	"Avidus"	3:28
Total length:		44:24

== Personnel ==
Chelsea Grin

- Alex Koehler — lead vocals
- Stephen Rutishauser — guitar
- Jake Harmond — guitar
- Dan Jones — guitar
- David Flinn — bass
- Pablo Viveros — drums, backing vocals
