= Chelsea Grin (EP) =

EP by Chelsea Grin
- Released: July 27, 2008
- Recorded: 2008
- Genre: Deathcore
- Length: 14:03
- Label: Statik Factory
- Producer: Stephan Hawkes

Chelsea Grin chronology
Chelsea Grin (2008)	Desolation of Eden (2010)

Singles from Chelsea Grin
- 1. "Recreant" Released: October 26, 2008

Professional ratings
Review scores
Source	Rating
Thrash Magazine	4/5 stars
Under the Gun Review	8/10

Chelsea Grin is the debut EP by American deathcore band Chelsea Grin, released in 2008. It was initially released as downloadable content through iTunes and was later made available as a CD through Statik Factory Records. Since the EP was released before the band was signed to Artery Recordings, original copies are rare and now highly valued.

The EP assisted in popularizing the band and the songs "Cheyne Stokes" and "Recreant" were re-recorded for their debut full-length album, which was released in February 2010. This is their only recording as 5 piece before they switched to their signature 6 piece lineup by adding a third guitarist, which would last until 2018.

In January 2015, the EP was reissued as a signed digipak and was made available on their online store. The release was limited to only 1,000 copies.

== Track listing ==
No.	Title	Length
1.	"Crewcabanger"	3:43
2.	"Anathema of the Sick"	3:31
3.	"Cheyne Stokes"	2:36
4.	"Disgrace"	2:34
5.	"Lifeless"	2:19
Total length:		14:03

Compact Disc edition bonus tracks
No.	Title	Length
6.	"Recreant"	3:30
Total length:		17:33

== Personnel ==
Chelsea Grin

- Alex Koehler - vocals
- Mike Stafford - lead guitar
- Chris Kilbourn - rhythm guitar
- Austin Marticorena - bass
- Andrew Carlston - drums

Production

- Produced by Stephan Hawkes
- Recorded, Mixed & mastered by Matt Winegar
- Art by Dennis Sibeijn
