= My Damnation =

Studio album by Chelsea Grin
- Released: July 19, 2011
- Recorded: January 13 – February 15, 2011
- Studio: Planet Z Studios, Hadley, Massachusetts
- Genre: Deathcore
- Length: 35:00
- Label: Artery
- Producer: Chris "Zeuss" Harris

Chelsea Grin chronology
Desolation of Eden (2010)	My Damnation (2011)	Evolve (2012)

Singles from My Damnation
- 1. "My Damnation" Released: April 19, 2011

Alternative cover

My Damnation is the second studio album by American deathcore band Chelsea Grin. The band entered the studio early 2011 and finished near the middle of the year. The title track was released as a single on April 17, 2011. My Damnation was released on July 19, 2011 through Artery Recordings.

== Theme and musical style ==
The album's lyrics reference Hell and eternal damnation, which are portrayed after death. Musically, the album features many more guitar solos than that of previous releases. Referencing the album, Alternative Press wrote that the band's "Suicide Silence-esque bludgeon" possessed "shades of blackened death metal".

Vocalist, Alex Koehler, stated that the record holds a specific concept in contrast to their previous albums; "I wanted to make the lyrics based more on a story of a man's journey from being a selfish tyrant, to being condemned to hell, seeking forgiveness, and salvation. I wasn't trying to write a religious or spiritual album. I just find the concept of heaven and hell completely fascinating, so it makes it easy to write about."

== Reception ==
Professional ratings
Aggregate scores
Source	Rating
Metacritic	50/100
Review scores
Source	Rating
AllMusic	3/5 stars
Alternative Press	2/5 stars
Consequence of Sound	C−
Kerrang!	2/5 stars

My Damnation was met with mixed reviews. The review aggregator site Metacritic gave the album 50/100, based on reviews of 4 critics.

Heany Gregory of AllMusic stated "Smashing together the macabre intensity of death metal with the chugging, technical gymnastics of metalcore, Utah’s Chelsea Grin brutalize listeners with their punishing sophomore effort ... [which] attacks the listener with a relentless deathcore barrage".

Alex Young of Consequence of Sound gave album C−, stating that "My Damnation serves as minor evidence that Chelsea Grin might not become a throwaway copycat. Fans can only hope polish doesn't push these Utah rockers away from their current path and towards the poppier territory of their more famous neighbors."

== Track listing ==
No.	Title	Length
1.	"The Foolish One"	3:39
2.	"Everlasting Sleep"	3:18
3.	"Behind a Veil of Lies"	3:23
4.	"Kharon" (instrumental)	1:18
5.	"My Damnation"	4:35
6.	"Cursed"	3:23
7.	"Calling in Silence" (featuring Nate Johnson of Fit for an Autopsy)	5:01
8.	"Oblivion"	3:35
9.	"Last Breath"	3:56
10.	"All Hail the Fallen King" (featuring Phil Bozeman of Whitechapel)	2:52
Total length:		35:00

== Charts ==
Chart	Peak position
U.S. Billboard 200	64
U.S. Billboard Rock Albums	16
U.S. Billboard Independent Albums	9
U.S. Billboard Hard Rock Albums	6

== Personnel ==
Chelsea Grin

- Alex Koehler – vocals
- Michael Stafford – guitar
- Jake Harmond – guitar
- Dan Jones – guitar
- David Flinn – bass
- Andrew Carlston – drums

Production

- Produced, mixed and engineered by Chris "Zeuss" Harris
- Artwork by Ryan Johnson
- Layout by Mike Milford
- Photo by Jeremy Saffer
