= Internet band =

Type of musical group

An Internet band, also called an online band, is a musical group whose members collaborate online through broadband by utilizing a content management system and local digital audio workstations. The work is sometimes released under a Creative Commons license, so musicians can share their "samples" to create collaborative musical expressions for noncommercial purposes without ever meeting face to face.

== History ==
=== Cathedral ===
In March 1996, Nora Farrell and William Duckworth began to develop Cathedral, one of the first interactive works of music and art on the World Wide Web. Their aim was to create an interactive website with web-based musical instruments that anyone could play. Also in the preliminary stages of the system, they determined that they wanted to make a place on the Web for acoustic music through a series of live webcasts and performances online.

In June 1997, Cathedral went live online. The first build of this system included streaming audio, streaming video, animation, images, and text. At the time, there were fewer than one million sites on the World Wide Web and fewer than 2% of those made any sounds.

According to the creators of Cathedral, their goals at that point were:

- To create an imaginative, ongoing artistic experience that builds community.
- To blur the distinctions that separate composers, performers, and audiences.
- To offer each individual listener the ability to create his or her own unique work online.

By 2003, Cathedral consisted of three primary components:

- A website that featured a variety of interactive musical, artistic, and text-based experiences.
- A group of virtual instruments that allowed listeners to participate actively and creatively.
- An Internet band that gave periodic live performances and offered listeners focused moments in which to come together and play music in community online.

== Current scenario ==
Social networking sites have gained a large number of users because many aspects of society revolve around computers and the Internet. The music industry itself has undergone this change as well. People are using iTunes, YouTube and MySpace Music to share their music and communicate with others. Adaptively, artists and record labels can utilize Web sites and file sharing sites to spread their music. Musicians who use the Internet can also form bands online.

Internet bands became popular in the early 2000s when music technology, file sharing and collaboration software became more prevalent on the Internet. While the extent of collaboration between bands may vary, an Internet band identifies as a band whose members collaborate on music projects via the Internet.

A number of websites offer people the opportunity to compose music online. They marry social networking with music mixing and uploading technology. Users decide what projects they wish to add their special touches to and how actively they want to get involved.

== Advantages ==
The advantages of joining an online band include the ability to collaborate with musicians, vocalists, audio engineers, etc. who reside in any part of the world with Internet access. Also, since many online bands do not perform or record in "real-time", it allows members to record their track (their part of a collaboration) at their leisure.

=== Education through online music collaboration ===
In addition to setting a platform to creatively collaborate with other musicians, online music collaboration gives opportunities to educators and students that were not possible before its conception. This platform provides an alternative to the traditional 1:1 music lesson, but its effectiveness on a higher scale is questionable.

Research conducted in 2007 at Boston University led by musicologist and comparative educationist David G. Hebert provided five key challenges for online music education programs:

1. Prejudice regarding the legitimacy of online degrees
2. Coordination between distance education and music departments
3. Pressure to maximize profits at the expense of educational quality
4. Management of adjunct music instructors
5. Management of student behavior and provision of student services

To address these challenges, Hebert pointed out the importance of expert mentors, outstanding research theses completed online, a strong record of graduate job placement from online programs, detailed planning between instructors and music departments, and the implementation of assessment moderation systems.

== Collaboration ==
Online music collaboration is an Internet-based system designed to help coordinate online music projects. Most platforms provide a virtual space to upload recorded music files, a community forum where members can offer feedback or make alterations to the uploaded music.

Each musician usually needs to record to a click track or metronome and upload the instrument or vocals for the song independently. Then a designated Internet music producer can edit for timing and tightness between all tracks, arrange, optimize and mix all instruments together and do a final mastering process to get a complete song out of single tracks.

== Related phenomenon ==
Internet-based music collaboration can be done by individuals who never form one permanent band. The Playing for Change Foundation is a musical charity that releases music recorded by musicians from all around the globe, only some of whom have gone on to play together live. Even more decentralized collaboration happens between YouTube users; one Cracked columnist praised the cover of the Game of Thrones theme performed by violinist Jason Yang and guitarist and sound engineer Roger Lima and directed by Paolo Dy.

And these people have never met. The Internet isn't just causing collaborations between people who would otherwise never have got together, it's creating collaborations between people who still haven't got together. There's just so much creativity being uploaded that we've reached collaboration critical-mass, where mixes can be generated across the world with nothing but HTTP. The result is a "super-feit" -- a copy superior to the original.

== Examples of Internet bands ==
- The ClipBandits, known as "the first Internet band", collaborated without ever having met each other, were featured on ABC World News and Good Morning America, and ultimately met and performed on the Tyra Banks Show in December 2006. Band members included Nick Matzorkis (ClipBandit on electric guitar), Joshua Keller (J-Pe$o on vocals), Valerie Lee (Girl Bass Player on bass), and Aaron Jackson (Action Jackson on drums).
- Infant Annihilator; a three-member deathcore band; two instrumentalists living in Kingston upon Hull, UK and vocalist living in Florida, US. Their original vocalist was from Indiana, US and recorded his vocals for their debut album without ever meeting the other two members.
- Red Abbott; a Boston based band that collaborated exclusively through email on their debut album.
- Superorganism's members originally met up in online forums and through mutuals before eventually meeting up in real life.

== See also ==
- Virtual band
