= Suffer in Heaven =

Studio album by Chelsea Grin
- Released: March 17, 2023
- Genre: Deathcore
- Length: 26:45
- Label: ONErpm
- Producer: Jeff Dunne; Zach Jones

Chelsea Grin chronology
Suffer in Hell (2022)	Suffer in Heaven (2023)

Singles from Suffer in Heaven
- 1. "Sing to the Grave" Released: January 20, 2023; 2. "Fathomless Maw" Released: February 17, 2023

Professional ratings
Review scores
Source	Rating
Metal Injection	9/10
Wall of Sound	8/10

Suffer in Heaven is the seventh studio album by American deathcore band Chelsea Grin. It was released on March 17, 2023, as the second part of a double album split as two separate releases, with the first part, Suffer in Hell, previously released on November 11, 2022. As with the previous album, former drummer/co-vocalist Pablo Viveros, despite being on hiatus from the band since 2021 and had made commitments with another artist in the downtime during COVID-19 pandemic to perform and tour, was still a member of the band, but would continue to take a hiatus from the band to fulfill his commitments, with session member Nathan Pearson taking his place.

Vocalist Tom Barber described Suffer in Heaven to be heavier and more aggressive than Suffer in Hell. In support of the album, the band toured with Carnifex in the United States in April and May 2023, supported by bands Left to Suffer and Ov Sulfur.

== Track listing ==
All tracks are written by David Flinn, Stephen Rutishauser, Tom Barber, and Zach Jones.

Suffer in Heaven track listing
No.	Title	Length
1.	"Leave with Us"	4:06
2.	"Orc March" (featuring Dustin Mitchell of Filth)	3:56
3.	"Fathomless Maw"	3:26
4.	"Soul Slave"	2:10
5.	"The Mind of God"	3:12
6.	"Yhorm the Giant"	3:15
7.	"Sing to the Grave"	2:36
8.	"The Path to Suffering"	4:04
Total length:		26:45

== Personnel ==
Chelsea Grin

- Tom Barber – vocals
- Stephen Rutishauser – guitars
- David Flinn – bass

Additional musicians

- Nathan Pearson – drums
- Dustin Mitchell – guest vocals on track 2

Additional personnel

- Jeff Dunne and Zach Jones – production
