= Bodysnatcher (band) =

American deathcore band

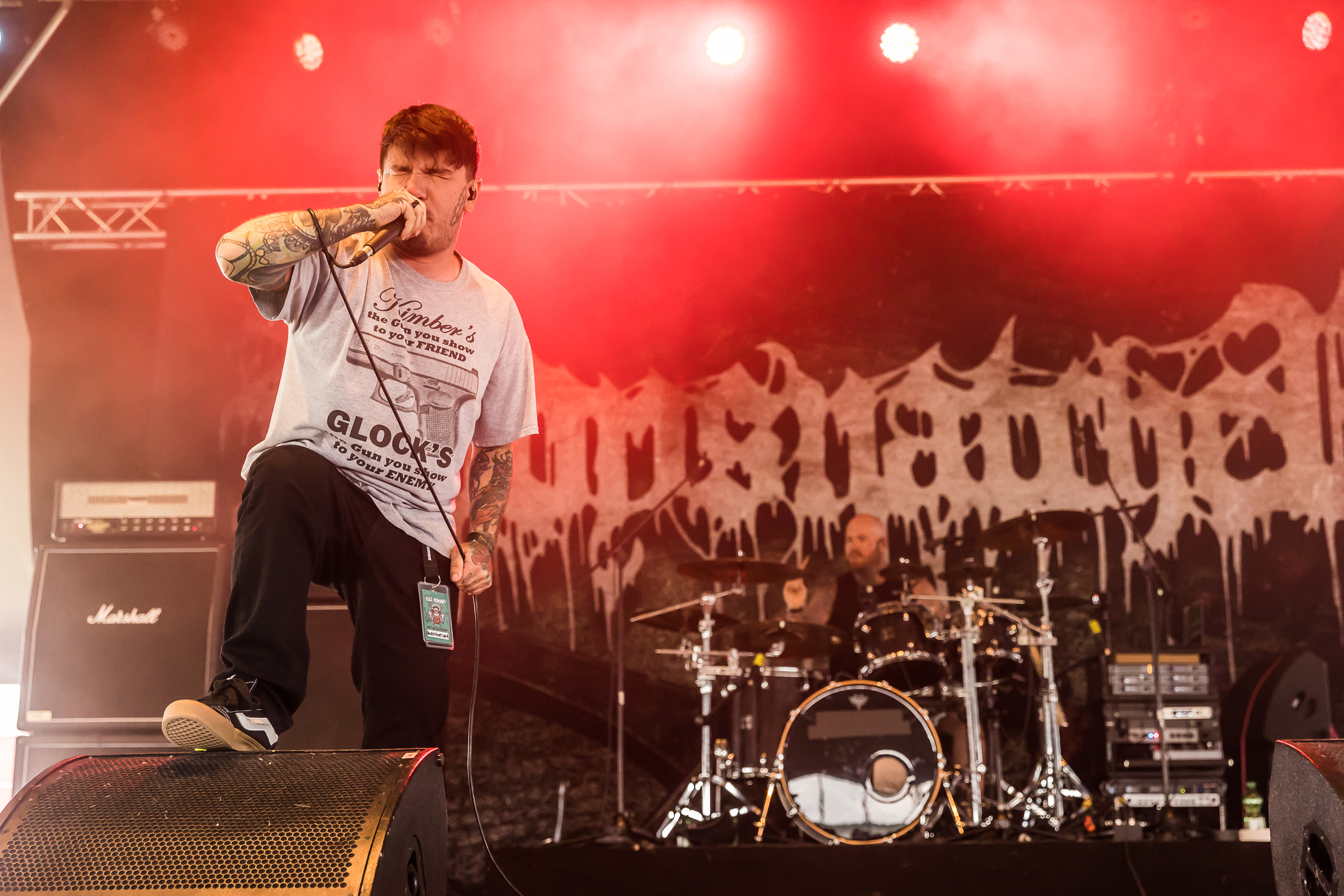
- Bodysnatcher live at Full Rewind Summer Open Air 2024

Background information
- Origin: Melbourne, Florida
- Genre: Deathcore
- Years active: 2014–present
- Labels: Stay Sick Recordings; MNRK Heavy
- Members: Kyle Medina; Kyle Carter; Kyle Shope; Chris Whited
- Website: bodysnatcherofficial.com

Bodysnatcher is an American deathcore band from Florida founded in 2014.

== History ==
Founded in 2014, they released their debut EP Abandonment in 2015. They have since released three studio albums: Death of Me in 2017, This Heavy Void in 2019 and Bleed-Abide in 2022. In 2024, they released their second EP Vile Conduct. On November 7, 2025 they released a single with a video, Blade Between The Teeth. On January 26, 2026, they released a new single, The Maker and announced their fourth studio album, Hell Is Here, Hell Is Home which released on April 10, 2026 with MNRK Heavy.

== Musical style and influences ==
The band has been described as deathcore with an emphasis on hardcore elements.

They have cited influences including Black Tongue, Overthrower, Traitors, King Conquer, Terror and Hatebreed.

== Members ==
- Kyle Medina – vocals
- Kyle Carter – guitars
- Kyle Shope – bass
- Chris Whited – drums

== Discography ==
=== Albums ===
- Death of Me (November 10, 2017) Stay Sick Recordings
- Death of Me (Deluxe) (October 26, 2018) Stay Sick Recordings
- This Heavy Void (January 31, 2020) Stay Sick Recordings
- Bleed-Abide (April 22, 2022) MNRK Heavy
- Hell Is Here, Hell Is Home (April 10, 2026) MNRK Heavy

=== EPs ===
- Abandonment (2015)
- Vile Conduct (2024)
- Abandonment: 10-Year Anniversary (2025)

=== Singles ===
- "Break the Cycle" (2020)
- "Take Me to Hell" (2021)
- "Smash Your Enemies (Hatebreed Cover)" (2021)
- "King of the Rats" (2021)
- "Dead Rabbit" (2023)
