= Jason Richardson (musician) =

American guitarist (born 1991)

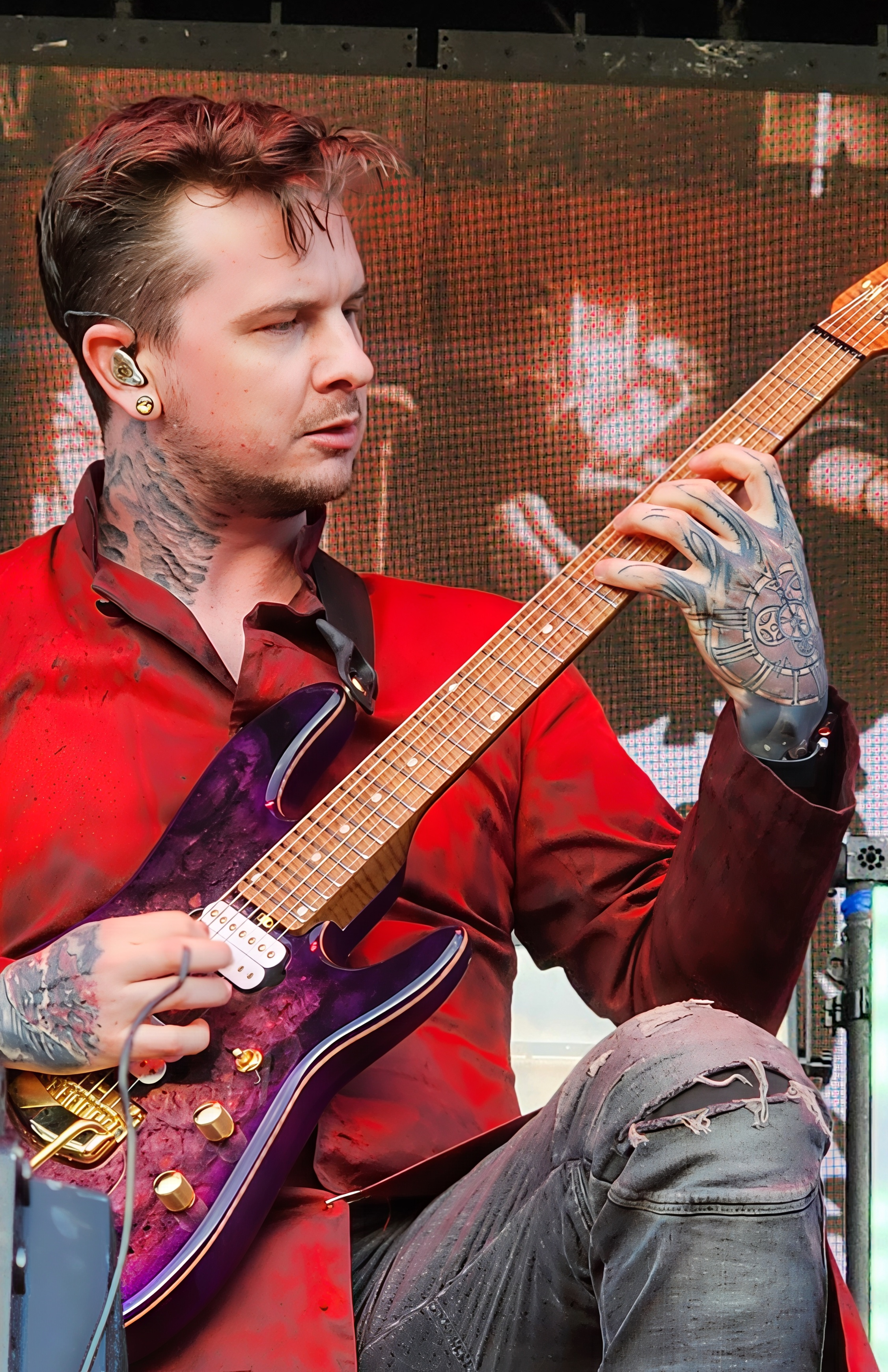
- Richardson performing in 2023

Background information
- Born: July 30, 1991 (age 35); Manassas, Virginia, U.S.
- Genres: Progressive metal; djent; metalcore; deathcore
- Occupation: Musician
- Instruments: Guitar; keyboards
- Formerly of: All Shall Perish; Born of Osiris; Chelsea Grin; All That Remains
- Website: jasonrichardsonmusic.com

Jason Reeves Richardson (born July 30, 1991) is an American guitarist. He is known for not being in bands very long and his work as a short term guitarist in Born of Osiris, Chelsea Grin, and All That Remains. He currently works as a solo artist.

== Career ==
On February 5, 2009, at age 17, Richardson replaced Chris Storey of All Shall Perish as a touring member.

In late 2011, Richardson parted ways with Born of Osiris. Then, in early 2012, he joined Chelsea Grin. On September 12, 2015, Richardson announced his departure from the band to focus on a solo career.

In 2016, Richardson released his debut solo album entitled I, produced by Taylor Larson and with ex-The Word Alive drummer Luke Holland as a member. The album had many guest appearances from the likes of Periphery's Mark Holcomb & Spencer Sotelo, Lukas Magyar of Veil of Maya, and Jeff Loomis.

In 2017, he embarked on his first tour as a solo act with instrumental progressive metal band Polyphia and math rock band Covet.

On November 9, 2018, it was reported that Richardson would replace the deceased Oli Herbert as live member for All That Remains on their European tour with Sevendust in December. On February 5, 2019, he became a full-time member of the group, appearing on their 2025 album Antifragile. Richardson left the band on July 29, 2025. He later revealed his departure was due to the business side of things and that he is still friends with the members of the band.

Between 2018 and 2022, Jason released four singles; "Tendinitis", "Upside Down (Featuring Tim Henson of Polyphia)", "Ishimura" and "p00mbachu" from his sophomore album titled II, which was released on July 15, 2022. II features Luke Holland on drums. He was featured on Falling in Reverse's song Ronald, as well as their 2026 release Joseph.

Richardson was featured as guitarist for the 2026 Miku Expo world wide.

== Discography ==
Born of Osiris (2009–2011)

- The Discovery (2011)

Chelsea Grin (2012–2015)

- Evolve EP (2012)
- Ashes to Ashes (2014)

All That Remains (2018–2025)

- Antifragile (2025)

As solo artist

- I (2016)
- I (The Orchestral Sessions) (2020)
- II (2022)

As featured artist

- Suffokate – "Vanishing" (feat. Jason Richardson) (2011)
- Polyphia – "Aviator" (feat. Jason Richardson) (2015)
- Purge of Lilith – "Warrior" (feat. Jason Richardson) (2015)
- Veil of Maya – "Teleute" (feat. Jason Richardson) (2015)
- Polyphia – "Nasty" (feat. Jason Richardson) (2018)
- Within Destruction – "Sakura" (feat. Jason Richardson) (2020)
- SION – "A Constant Reminder" (feat. Jason Richardson) (2021)
- G2 – "Our Way" (feat. Jason Richardson, Tina Guo, Luke Holland, Carlos Ocelote, Taylor Davis, Noora Louhimo) (2022)
- August Burns Red – "Tightrope" – (feat. Jason Richardson) (2023)
- Termina – "Under Your Knife" – (feat. Saxl Rose and Jason Richardson) (2023)
- Falling in Reverse – Ronald (feat Tech N9ne, Alex Terrible) (2024)
- Falling in Reverse - Joseph (feat Corey Taylor, Serj Tankian) (2026)

As live member

- All Shall Perish (2009–2010)
- All That Remains (2018–2019, became full member in February 2019)
- Miku Expo (2026)
