= Ashes to Ashes (Chelsea Grin album) =

Studio album by Chelsea Grin
- Released: July 8, 2014
- Recorded: November 1, 2013 – March 4, 2014
- Genres: melodic metalcore; metalcore; deathcore
- Length: 59:32
- Labels: Artery; Razor & Tie
- Producers: Chelsea Grin; Diego Farias; Stetson Whitworth

Chelsea Grin chronology
Evolve (2012)	Ashes to Ashes (2014)	Self Inflicted (2016)

Singles from Ashes to Ashes
- 1. "Letters" Released: December 16, 2013; 2. "Angels Shall Sin, Demons Shall Pray" Released: May 6, 2014; 3. "Playing with Fire" Released: June 4, 2014; 4. "Clockwork" Released: June 17, 2014

Ashes to Ashes is the third studio album by American deathcore band Chelsea Grin released on July 8, 2014 via Artery and Razor & Tie. It is also the debut of drummer Pablo Viveros. The album also saw the debut of Viveros' co-vocals, allowing lead vocalist Alex Koehler to focus solely on high ranged screams while Viveros took on the mid to low ranged vocals. It is the last release by the band to feature Jason Richardson on guitar.

== Style ==
AllMusic described the sound of the album as deathcore and on some songs metalcore relating it to that of their previous two studio albums.

== Release ==
Ashes to Ashes was released on July 8, 2014 by Artery Recordings.

== Reception ==
Professional ratings
Review scores
Source	Rating
AllMusic	3.5/5 stars
Ultimate Guitar Archive	7/10

AllMusic gave the album three and a half stars out of five, noting that "Chelsea Grin marry their punishing breakdowns with some pretty dazzling guitar work, showing that there's more to their sound than just smashing the listener into oblivion."

== Track listing ==
Tracks
No.	Title	Length
1.	"Playing with Fire"	3:56
2.	"Pledge Allegiance"	4:02
3.	"Morte Ætérna"	3:33
4.	"Nightmares"	5:11
5.	"Illuminate"	5:55
6.	"Sellout"	3:36
7.	"Waste Away"	4:29
8.	"Ashes..." (instrumental)	1:17
9.	"...To Ashes" (instrumental)	2:16
10.	"Angels Shall Sin, Demons Shall Pray"	3:09
11.	"Letters"	4:15
12.	"Cheers to Us"	3:09
13.	"Clockwork"	4:28
14.	"Undying"	5:04
15.	"Dust to Dust..."	5:12
Total length:		59:32

== Personnel ==
Chelsea Grin

- Alex Koehler — lead vocals
- Jason Richardson — lead guitar
- Jake Harmond — guitar
- Dan Jones — guitar
- David Flinn — bass
- Pablo Viveros — drums, backing vocals

Production

- Produced by Chelsea Grin, Diego Farias & Stetson Whitworth
- Mixed by Diego Farias at Farias Studios
- Mastered by Zack Ohren at Castle Ultimate Studios
- Vocal engineered by Stetson Whitworth at High Vibe Studios, Salt Lake City, UT
- Guitar & bass engineered by Diego Farias at Michael Rogers Guest Bedroom
- Drums engineered by Diego Farias, Stetson Whitworth & Steve Olmon at Ameraycan Studios, North Hollywood, CA
- Additional composer: Stephen Rutishauser (track 4)
- Additional programming by Andres Farias (tracks 2, 12)
- Management by Mike Milford & Eric Rushing (The Artery Foundation)
- A&R by Mike Milford
- Booking by Matt Andersen (The Agency Group) & Marco Walzel (Avocado Booking)
- Artwork by Ryan Johnson

== Charts ==
Chart	Peak position
U.S. Billboard 200	27
U.S. Billboard Rock Albums	8
U.S. Billboard Independent Albums	3
U.S. Billboard Hard Rock Albums	4
