= Rings of Saturn (band) =

American deathcore band

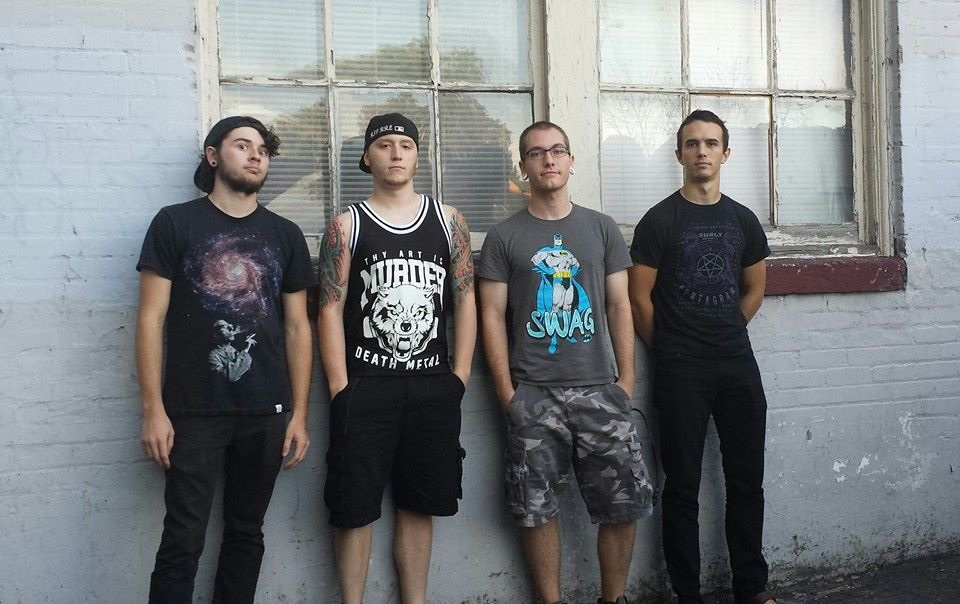
- Rings of Saturn in 2013. From left to right: Joel Omans, Ian Bearer, Lucas Mann and Jesse Beahler.

Background information
- Origin: Bay Area, California, U.S.
- Genres: Deathcore; technical death metal; instrumental rock (recently)
- Years active: 2009–present
- Labels: Unique Leader; Nuclear Blast
- Members: Lucas Mann; Ryan Sinnott
- Past members: See former members

Rings of Saturn is an American deathcore and technical death metal band from the Bay Area, California. The band was formed in 2009 and was originally just a studio project. However, after gaining a wide popularity and signing to Unique Leader Records, the band formed a full line-up and became a full-time touring band. Rings of Saturn's music features a highly technical style, heavily influenced by themes of alien life and outer space. They have released six full-length albums, with their third, Lugal Ki En, released in 2014 and peaking at 126 on the American Billboard 200 chart while their fourth, Ultu Ulla was released in 2017 and peaked at 76 on the Billboard 200, making it the band's highest peak to date. Gidim was released in October 2019. The band's self-titled instrumental album was released in June 2022.

== History ==
Rings of Saturn was formed in 2009 in high school as a studio-only recording project with Lucas Mann on guitars, bass, and keyboards; Peter Pawlak on vocals, and Brent Silletto on drums. The band posted a track titled "Abducted" online and quickly gained listeners. The band recorded their debut album, Embryonic Anomaly, with Bob Swanson at Mayhemnness Studios in Sacramento, California. The album was self-released by the band on May 25, 2010. Four months after releasing Embryonic Anomaly, the band signed to Unique Leader Records. In the months following the band's signing, Joel Omans was added as a second guitarist and the band graduated high school, which led to their embarking on tours. Embryonic Anomaly was re-released through Unique Leader on March 1, 2011, and their two following albums would later also be released through the label. Brent Silletto and Peter Pawlak both left the band in December 2011.

Rings of Saturn, which at this point only included Mann and Omans, toured with many different touring members before forming a line-up which added Ian Bearer, Sean Martinez and Ian Baker on vocals, bass, and drums respectively. This line-up recorded their second studio album, Dingir, with the same producer from Embryonic Anomaly. The album was originally scheduled to be released on November 20, 2012, but due to legal issues, the album release was pushed back to February 5, 2013. In response to the legal push and a pre-production version of the album leaking on the internet, Bearer uploaded the finished album on his YouTube channel and put up the entire album for download via Total Deathcore. Baker and Martinez parted ways with the band shortly after the official release of Dingir. The band later took part in The Summer Slaughter Tour of 2013, adding Jesse Beahler for drums until the end of the tour.

Rings of Saturn went into recording their 3rd studio album in Pittsburgh, Pennsylvania, having Aaron Kitcher of Infant Annihilator and Black Tongue to fill in all drum arrangements as a special guest on the album. Aaron Stechauner later joined as a full-time member for drums after the album was finished. On July 1, 2014, the band released the cover art and track list to their third studio album Lugal Ki En which was released on October 14, 2014. They also released their first music video for "Senseless Massacre" directed by Alex T. Reinhard. The band toured the United States, Canada, and for the first time Mexico shortly after, but no new songs were played from the newly released album. On December 9, Omans announced his departure from the band, stating on his personal Facebook that he left because Mann became "a hack of a musician" and "hindered the band from playing new songs from Lugal Ki En" during its album release tour. Two weeks later, on December 26, Miles Dimitri Baker was announced as their new second guitarist.

On April 2, 2015, Rings of Saturn released a live guitar play-through featuring Mann and Baker performing the song "Godless Times" from Lugal Ki En, in response to allegations that they could not play their parts. Three months later, on August 28, the band released the single "Seized and Devoured 2.0", a re-recorded track off of their first album Embryonic Anomaly featuring Bearer's vocals. Shortly after, the band began touring in North America, with a set-list that consisted of mainly Lugal Ki En songs being played for the first time live. Later that year, On December 25, the band released a collaboration single titled "Souls of This Mortality" with its side project band Interloper. Rings of Saturn then began its first tour in Europe in early 2016, followed by a North American tour supporting Thy Art Is Murder. On May 17, 2016, the band announced that they signed to Nuclear Blast.

On July 31, Rings of Saturn announced that they had finished writing their fourth studio album, Ultu Ulla, and it was released on July 28, 2017. On June 2, 2017, the band released their second music video for the song "Inadequate". On July 7, 2017, the band released a lyric video for the second single off Ultu Ulla, "Parallel Shift". Stechauner & Baker announced their departure from Rings of Saturn on May 26, 2018. Soon after the departure of Stechauner and Baker, it was announced via Facebook that former guitarist Omans would reunite with the band, and Desecrate the Faith drummer Mike Caputo would be joining them along with Japanese guitarist Yo Onityan. On February 10, 2019, Rings of Saturn's Facebook page pointed out that Caputo and Onityan were then touring members.

The band released their fifth studio album titled Gidim on October 25, 2019. It featured Marco Pitruzella on drums, as well as a guest solo from Charles Caswell of Berried Alive on the song "Pustules", vocals from Dan Watson of Enterprise Earth on "Hypodermis Glitch", and a solo from Onityan on "Tormented Consciousness". On September 8, 2020, the band confirmed that Caputo was being made a full-time member of the band. On April 30, the band were dropped from Nuclear Blast following alleged threats from Mann. On May 14, the band announced the departure of vocalist Bearer, and stated they would transition towards a strictly instrumental direction. On June 15, 2022, the band released their self-titled sixth studio album while also announcing physical formats would be released at a future date. On January 21, 2024, the band announced Ryan Sinnott (who originally began touring for them in 2022) as their new official drummer, and released the single "Theogony" the very next day. On April 26th, 2024, Omans announced his second departure from the band.

== Musical style ==
AllMusic described Rings of Saturn as a "progressive, technical deathcore outfit", writing that they have "humorously deemed their brand of technical death metal 'aliencore.'" The band employs fast riffing with an added harmony effect, fast tempos, ambient elements, djent elements, and lyrics that deal with space invasion and extraterrestrial life. This has led some journalists to apply the tag "progressive alien deathcore" to their music.

== Band members ==
Current

- Lucas Mann – guitars (2009–present); bass (2009, 2009–2010, 2013–present); keyboards, synthesizers, programming (2009–2010, 2011–present)
- Ryan Sinnott – drums (2024–present; touring member 2022–2024)

Touring

- Kyle Gross – guitars (2024–present)

Former

- Ben Gower – bass (2009)
- Brent Siletto – drums (2009–2011)
- Mus Albert – bass (2011)
- Brent Glover – bass (2011)
- Joel Omans – guitars (2011–2014, 2018–2024); bass (2013–2014, 2018–2024)
- Peter Pawlak – vocals (2009–2011)
- Jeff Hughell – bass (2011)
- Chris Wells – keyboards, synthesizers, programming (2010–2011)
- John Galloway – vocals (2011–2012); keyboards, synthesizers, programming (touring member 2012–2013)
- Jack Aldrich – bass (2011–2012)
- Ron Casey – drums (2011–2012)
- Sean Martinez – bass (2012–2013)
- Ian Baker – drums (2012–2013)
- Jesse Beahler – drums (2013–2014)
- Miles Dimitri Baker – guitars, bass (2014–2018)
- Aaron Stechauner – drums (2015–2018)
- Ian Bearer – vocals (2012–2021)
- Mike Caputo – drums (2020–2022; touring member 2018–2020)

Former Touring

- Aaron Kitcher – drums (2014)
- Yosuke Haga – guitars, bass (2018–2019)
- Marco Pitruzzella – drums (2018–2019)
- Peter Pawlak – vocals (2021–2022)

Timeline

== Discography ==
=== Studio albums ===
- Embryonic Anomaly (2010)
- Dingir (2013)
- Lugal Ki En (2014)
- Ultu Ulla (2017)
- Gidim (2019)
- Rings of Saturn (2022)

=== Music videos ===
- "Senseless Massacre" (2014)
- "Inadequate" (2017)
- "Margidda" (2018)
- "The Husk" (2019)
- "Abducted (10th Anniversary Remake)" (2021)

=== Singles ===
- "Seized and Devoured 2.0" (2015)
- "Souls of This Mortality" (2015)
- "Theogony" (2024)
