= Embryonic Anomaly =

Studio album by Rings of Saturn
- Released: May 25, 2010
- Recorded: January–February 2010
- Studio: Mayhemness Studios, Sacramento, California
- Genre: Deathcore; technical death metal
- Length: 35:07
- Label: Self-released
- Producer: Bob Swanson

Rings of Saturn chronology
Embryonic Anomaly (2010)	Dingir (2013)

2021 Remake
- Artwork used for the 2021 Remake

Professional ratings
Review scores
Source	Rating
Sputnikmusic	3.5/5 stars

Embryonic Anomaly is the debut studio album by American deathcore band Rings of Saturn. It was produced by Bob Swanson at Mayhemness Studios located in Sacramento, California. It was self-released by the band on May 25, 2010. Four months after the release, the band signed to Unique Leader Records. This was the only album to feature Peter Pawlak on vocals.

A remake of Embryonic Anomaly was released in February 2021 as part of the 10 year anniversary for the original CD. The remake includes new album art by Mark Cooper, production by Sammy Morales and drumming redone by Marco Pitruzzella.

== Promotion and release ==
Embryonic Anomaly was re-released through Unique Leader on March 1, 2011. Unlike the band's second album Dingir, Embryonic Anomaly was recorded with the original lineup of only three members while they were at the ages ranging from 16 to 18 and were still attending high school.

== Track listing ==
No.	Title	Length
1.	"Invasion"	4:07
2.	"Seized and Devoured"	4:03
3.	"Abducted"	4:07
4.	"Final Abhorrent Dream"	5:03
5.	"Corpses Thrown Across the Sky"	4:04
6.	"Embryonic Anomaly"	3:25
7.	"Annihilating the Pure"	4:53
8.	"Grinding of Internal Organs"	4:28
9.	"End of Humanity"	0:57
Total length:		35:07

== Personnel ==
Rings of Saturn

- Peter Pawlak – vocals, vocal arrangement
- Lucas Mann – guitars, bass, keyboards, synthesizers, programming, vocal arrangement
- Brent Silletto – drums

Additional personnel

- Bob Swanson – production, mixing, mastering, tracking
- Jon Leyden – tracking
- Tony Koehl – artwork, photography
- Sammy Morales (2021 remake) – production, mixing, mastering
