= Ultu Ulla =

Studio album by Rings of Saturn
- Released: July 28, 2017
- Studio: Studio 344; Kirkbride Recordings; Mann Studio
- Genre: Deathcore; technical death metal
- Length: 42:01
- Label: Nuclear Blast
- Producer: Brette Ciamarra

Rings of Saturn chronology
Lugal Ki En (2014)	Ultu Ulla (2017)	Gidim (2019)

Singles from Ultu Ulla
- 1. "Inadequate" Released: June 1, 2017; 2. "Parallel Shift" Released: July 6, 2017

Ultu Ulla is the fourth studio album by American deathcore band Rings of Saturn. It was released on July 28, 2017, through Nuclear Blast. It is their first release through Nuclear Blast since their signing in May 2016. It is their only full-length release with drummer Aaron Stechauner and guitarist Miles Dimitri Baker. Mark Cooper of Mind Rape Art was responsible for the album artwork, as he was on the band's prior releases. The album was produced, mixed, and mastered by Brette Ciamarra at Studio 344 in Pittsburgh, Pennsylvania. Ciamarra had previously produced Lugal Ki En for the band. The album debuted at #76 on the Billboard 200 chart, making it the band's highest debut to date. According to Metal news site Metal Insider, the album sold 8,000 copies in its first week.

== Background and promotion ==
In May 2017, band founder Lucas Mann posted a promo video (in which he was wearing a Guitar Pro shirt, as a likely nod to prior controversies involving the band) hinting at an upcoming record and single on May 26.

On June 2, the band officially announced Ultu Ulla. Speaking on the title, Mann stated:

The album name, Ultu Ulla, means 'Time Immemorial' in Sumerian Cuneiform. Ultu Ulla is about aliens transcending space and time and uncovering an ancient incomprehensible entity that threatens the fabric of universal existence

Speaking on the album artwork, Mark Cooper, who delivered the artwork for the band's third album Lugal Ki En, stated:

The general idea was to create a scene where gods from beyond time and space are invading 3D-reality and taking over. They are chaotic beings that can take any form at will and manifest anything with their imaginations.

Two promotional singles were released prior to the album's launch: "Inadequate" on June 1, and "Parallel Shift" on July 6.

A lyric video was published to the band's label's YouTube channel for "Parallel Shift" on the same date the single was released.

On July 12, a guitar play-through of "Parallel Shift" was published to Nuclear Blast's YouTube channel.

A music video was released by the band for the song "Inadequate," as well as a drum play-through video.

== Critical reception ==
Professional ratings
Review scores
Source	Rating
Metal Injection	8.5/10

Metal Injection gave the album an 8.5 out of 10, calling it an "absolutely fun album to hear."

== Track listing ==
All lyrics are written by Ian Bearer; all music is composed by Lucas Mann and Miles Dimitri Baker.

No.	Title	Length
1.	"Servant of This Sentience"	4:16
2.	"Parallel Shift"	3:49
3.	"Unhallowed" (instrumental)	1:01
4.	"Immemorial Essence"	4:44
5.	"The Relic"	4:46
6.	"Margidda"	5:00
7.	"Harvest"	4:14
8.	"The Macrocosm" (instrumental)	6:20
9.	"Prognosis Confirmed"	3:54
10.	"Inadequate"	3:57
Total length:		42:01

== Personnel ==
Rings of Saturn

- Ian Bearer – vocals, composition
- Lucas Mann – guitars, bass, keyboards, synthesizers, programming, composition, arrangement
- Miles Dimitri Baker – guitars, bass, composition, arrangement
- Aaron Stechauner – drums

Additional personnel

- Brette Ciamarra – production, mixing, mastering
- Mark Cooper – artwork, layout

== Charts ==
Chart (2017)	Peak position
US Billboard 200	76
US Independent Albums (Billboard)	4
US Top Hard Rock Albums (Billboard)	5
US Top Rock Albums (Billboard)	15
