= Lugal Ki En =

Studio album by Rings of Saturn
- Released: October 14, 2014
- Studios: Studio 344, Pittsburgh, Pennsylvania
- Genres: Deathcore; technical death metal
- Length: 44:34
- Label: Unique Leader
- Producer: Brette Ciamarra

Rings of Saturn chronology
| Dingir (2013) | Lugal Ki En (2014) | Ultu Ulla (2017) |

Lugal Ki En is the third studio album by American deathcore band Rings of Saturn released on October 14, 2014. It was produced by Brette Ciamarra at Studio 344 in Pittsburgh, Pennsylvania and features guest solo work by Rusty Cooley from Day of Reckoning and custom artwork by Mark Cooper of Mind Rape Art, who also created the band's Dingir cover. This album also features Aaron Kitcher from Infant Annihilator and Black Tongue on drums. Rings of Saturn decided to cover deathcore band Suicide Silence's "No Pity for a Coward" in dedication to Mitch Lucker. On October 6, 2014, Lucas Mann released a full album stream of the album on his YouTube channel, a week before its scheduled release for October 14 (US) and October 17 (EU). The album reached 126 on the Billboard 200 chart and sold 3,025 copies in its first week. This is the last album to feature guitarist Joel Omans before his return in 2018.

== Composition ==
Lead guitarist, Lucas Mann states that, "The concept of the album in a nutshell is that long after the Aliens conquer humanity, they evolve to a point where they transcend space, time and reality to take their conquest into the realm of the gods where they wage war on angels and demons. The album title Lugal Ki En translates from ancient Sumerian cuneiform to mean 'King Of Earth, King Of The Universe.' The Sumerian cuneiform is visible behind the English pronunciation of the album title."

== Promotion and release ==
On August 12, 2014, a music video for the song "Senseless Massacre" was released on guitarist Lucas Mann's YouTube channel.

== Controversy ==
The band stated on their Facebook page that they will not be playing any new songs from Lugal Ki En on its album release tour because "We didn't have time to practice as a band." Also noting that most of the members live in a different State in the U.S. However, after the album release tour, Joel Omans left the band very frustrated, stating on his personal Facebook that Lucas, "didn't learn the new songs from Lugal Ki En" which hindered any new material from being played live, at the same time damaging the reputation of his former bandmate, thus triggering an online backlash against Lucas Mann. 2 weeks later Miles Dimitri Baker jumped in as the band's new guitarist. On April 2, 2015, the band released a live playthrough of the song "Godless Times" in response to the allegations. 6 months later the band toured with a setlist that mainly consisted of Lugal Ki En songs.

== Track listing ==
All lyrics are written by Ian Bearer; all music is composed by Lucas Mann, except where noted.

| No. | Title | Music | Length |
|---|---|---|---|
| 1. | "Senseless Massacre" | | 3:34 |
| 2. | "Desolate Paradise" | | 3:25 |
| 3. | "Lalassu Xul" | | 3:39 |
| 4. | "Infused" (featuring Rusty Cooley) | | 3:21 |
| 5. | "Fractal Intake" | | 0:40 |
| 6. | "Natural Selection" | | 3:54 |
| 7. | "Beckon" | | 3:28 |
| 8. | "Godless Times" | | 3:32 |
| 9. | "Unsympathetic Intellect" | | 4:06 |
| 10. | "Eviscerate" | | 4:27 |
| 11. | "The Heavens Have Fallen" (instrumental) | | 6:51 |
| 12. | "No Pity for a Coward" (Suicide Silence cover) | Mark Heylmun, Chris Garza, Mike Bodkins, Alex Lopez | 3:30 |
| Total length: | | | 44:34 |

== Personnel ==
Rings of Saturn

- Ian Bearer – vocals
- Lucas Mann – guitars, bass, keyboards, synthesizers, programming
- Joel Omans – guitars, bass

Additional musicians

- Aaron Kitcher – drums
- Rusty Cooley – guest guitar solo on "Infused"

Additional personnel

- Brette Ciamarra – production, mixing, mastering
- Mark Cooper – artwork

== Charts ==
| Chart (2014) | Peak position |
|---|---|
| US Billboard 200 | 126 |
| US Independent Albums (Billboard) | 27 |
| US Top Hard Rock Albums (Billboard) | 12 |
| US Top Rock Albums (Billboard) | 41 |
