= The Somnial Plunge into Cyclic Ebullition =

Studio album by Infant Annihilator
- Released: 1 December 2026
- Length: 91:32
- Label: Self-released

Infant Annihilator chronology
The Battle of Yaldabaoth (2019)	The Somnial Plunge into Cyclic Ebullition (2026)

The Somnial Plunge into Cyclic Ebullition is the upcoming fourth studio album by the English deathcore band Infant Annihilator. It is set to be released on 1 December 2026.

== Background ==
In January 2026, vocalist Dickie Allen confirmed the band's upcoming fourth album would be released sometime in 2026.

On 16 October 2026, Infant Annihilator announced the album will be released on 1 December 2026. One week later, they revealed that the album will be titled The Somnial Plunge into Cyclic Ebullition (abbreviated SPICE).

== Track listing ==
No.	Title	Length
1.	"Kumari Kandamned"	2:31
2.	"Antarabhūt Prakṛiti"	6:27
3.	"Paranatellon"	9:39
4.	"Eeshvarah and the Path to Dhat-Badan"	6:34
5.	"Eeshvarah and the Slavers of the Cinnabar Sands"	5:42
6.	"Nīlīś Viśāpīn"	8:27
7.	"Ba'alasarpamohakah"	10:19
8.	"Eeshvarah and the Rubious Dawn"	6:23
9.	"Eeshvarah: A Sibylline Synaxarion"	6:03
10.	"Extispicy Suq"	3:29
11.	"The Fall of Mahānīl"	16:16
12.	"Pravṛitti"	9:42
Total length:		91:32

== Personnel ==
- Aaron Kitcher – drums
- Eddie Pickard – guitar, bass guitar
- Dickie Allen – vocals
