= Desolation of Eden =

Studio album by Chelsea Grin
- Released: February 16, 2010
- Recorded: August 2009
- Studio: Lambesis Studios, San Marcos, California
- Genre: Deathcore
- Length: 35:11
- Label: Artery; Razor & Tie
- Producer: Tim Lambesis

Chelsea Grin chronology
Chelsea Grin (2008)	Desolation of Eden (2010)	My Damnation (2011)

Singles from Desolation of Eden
- 1. "Desolation of Eden" Released: 2010

Alternate cover one

Alternate cover two

Desolation of Eden is the debut studio album by American deathcore band Chelsea Grin. It was released February 16, 2010 through Artery Recordings. Upon its release, the album peaked at #21 on the Top Heatseekers chart. Desolation of Eden features two re-recordings of the songs "Cheyne Stokes" and "Recreant" which were originally on the band's self-titled EP.

== Style ==
Alex Henderson of AllMusic described the style of music on the album as deathcore; a "noisy, caustic, abrasive mixture of metalcore and death metal."

== Reception ==
Professional ratings
Review scores
Source	Rating
AllMusic	3/5 stars
Alternative Press	3.5/5 stars
Blabbermouth.net	2.5/10

AllMusic awarded the album three stars out of five, noting that it was not an album for everyone, but an audience "who do appreciate highly technical deathcore will find Desolation of Eden to be a likable (if less than stellar) contribution to metal's lunatic fringe."

== Track listing ==
No.	Title	Length
1.	"Judgement"	1:13
2.	"Desolation of Eden"	3:52
3.	"False Sense of Sanity"	2:45
4.	"Sonnet of the Wretched"	4:15
5.	"Cheyne Stokes" (re-recorded version; original version from Chelsea Grin)	2:50
6.	"The Human Condition"	4:02
7.	"Elysium" (instrumental)	2:28
8.	"Recreant" (re-recorded version, original version from Chelsea Grin)	4:26
9.	"Cast from Perfection"	2:43
10.	"Revenant"	4:12
11.	"Wasteland" (instrumental)	2:28
Total length:		35:11

== Personnel ==
Chelsea Grin

- Alex Koehler – vocals
- Michael Stafford – guitar
- Jake Harmond – guitar
- Dan Jones – guitar
- David Flinn – bass
- Andrew Carlston – drums

Production

- Produced by Timothy Lambesis
- Engineered & mixed by Daniel Castleman
- Mastered by Stephan Hawkes
- Management by Mike Milford & Eric Rushing (The Artery Foundation)
- Booking by Nick Storch
