= Rings of Saturn (Rings of Saturn album) =

Studio album by Rings of Saturn
- Released: June 15, 2022
- Genre: Progressive metal; instrumental rock; electronic
- Length: 30:28
- Label: Self-released
- Producer: Rings of Saturn; Sammy Morales; Virginia Leo

Rings of Saturn chronology
Gidim (2019)	Rings of Saturn (2022)

Professional ratings
Review scores
Source	Rating
Sputnikmusic	1.5

Rings of Saturn is the sixth studio album by American deathcore band Rings of Saturn. It was self-produced and was self-released by the band on June 15, 2022.

== Background ==
On April 30, 2021, the band announced that they had parted ways with Nuclear Blast after guitarist Lucas Mann began threatening the label by saying he'd make public statements "'condemning Nuclear Blast in the strongest terms possible' if the label does not give in to his baseless demands." On May 14, the band announced that vocalist Ian Bearer departed from the band for unknown reasons and continued as an instrumental group.

== Track listing ==
Rings of Saturn track listing
No.	Title	Length
1.	"Shrine"	5:06
2.	"Kronos"	5:43
3.	"Ascending"	5:35
4.	"Genesis"	3:10
5.	"Mind Palace"	5:39
6.	"Sector 80"	0:14
7.	"Shinigami"	4:58
Total length:		30:28

== Personnel ==
Credits adapted from Discogs.

Rings of Saturn

- Lucas Mann – guitars, bass, keyboards, drum programming, synthesizers, arranging
- Joel Omans – guitars, bass

Additional personnel

- Rings of Saturn – production
- Sammy Morales – production, percussion, mixing, mastering
- Virginia Leo – production, piano
- Jake Bratrude – beats, arranging
