= The Battle of Yaldabaoth =

Studio album by Infant Annihilator
- Released: 11 September 2019
- Genres: Deathcore; technical death metal
- Length: 57:33
- Label: Self-released

Infant Annihilator chronology
The Elysian Grandeval Galèriarch (2016)	The Battle of Yaldabaoth (2019)	The Somnial Plunge into Cyclic Ebullition (2026)

Singles from The Battle of Yaldabaoth
- 1. "Three Bastards" Released: 25 July 2019; 2. "Swinaecologist" Released: 30 August 2019

Professional ratings
Review scores
Source	Rating
Dead Press	3/5 stars

The Battle of Yaldabaoth (abbreviated as The BOY) is the third studio album by the English deathcore band Infant Annihilator. It was released on 11 September 2019. It is their second album with vocalist Dickie Allen.

== Background ==
The band released a music video for the album's single "Three Bastards" on 25 July 2019.

== Track list ==
No.	Title	Length
1.	"Childchewer"	2:46
2.	"Three Bastards"	4:18
3.	"The Kingdom Sitteth Lonely Beneath Thine Hollowed Heavens" (featuring Trevor Strnad)	7:07
4.	"Ov Sacrament and Sincest" (featuring Storm Strope)	3:19
5.	"Feast ov Goreglutton"	2:23
6.	"Plaguebearer"	5:03
7.	"Swinaecologist"	3:37
8.	"A Rape of Sirens" (featuring Alex Terrible)	4:40
9.	"Empusa: Queen of the Damned"	5:07
10.	"Ere the Crimson Dawn"	3:30
11.	"Thy Faith, Thy Oblivion"	3:30
12.	"The Battle of Yaldabaoth" (featuring Alex Teyen)	6:06
13.	"Necropocalypse"	5:32
14.	"Paedophilic Legacy" (Instrumental)	0:32
Total length:		57:33

== Personnel ==
- Aaron Kitcher – drums
- Eddie Pickard – guitar, bass guitar
- Dickie Allen – vocals

== Chart performance ==
Chart (2018)	Peak position
US Top Hard Rock Albums (Billboard)	11
US Top Rock Albums (Billboard)	22
US Top Album Sales (Billboard)	54
US Independent Albums (Billboard)	20
US Heatseekers Albums (Billboard)	6
