= Black Tongue =

English band

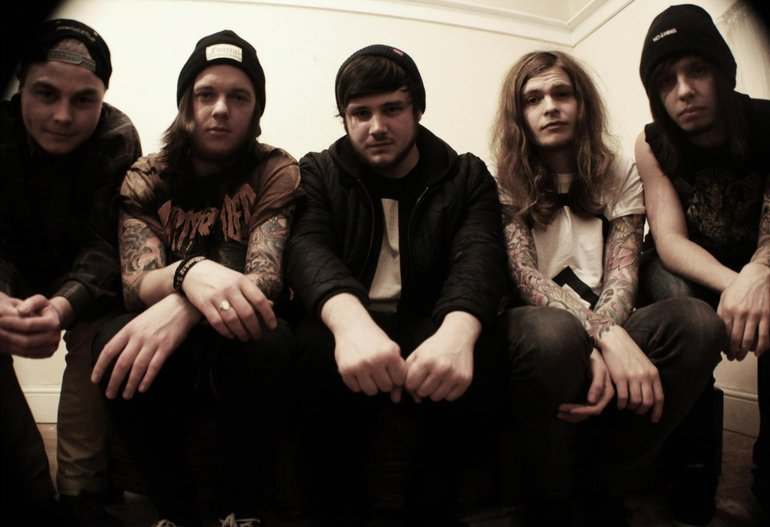
- Photograph from October 2018

Background information
- Origin: Kingston upon Hull, East Riding of Yorkshire, U.K.
- Genres: Downtempo deathcore; deathcore; doom metal
- Years active: 2013–present
- Label: Century Media
- Spinoff of: Infant Annihilator
- Members: Alex Teyen; Eddie Pickard; James Harrison; Lloyd Newton; Aaron Kitcher

Black Tongue is an English deathcore band from Kingston upon Hull. Formed in 2013 by Alex Teyen (vocals), James Harrison (guitar) and Lloyd Newton (bass), as well as Infant Annihilator members Eddie Pickard (guitar) and Aaron Kitcher (drums), their fusion of deathcore with elements of doom metal helped to pioneer the downtempo deathcore subgenre. They released their debut EP Falsifier in 2013, followed by Born Hanged (2014). They released their debut album, The Unconquerable Dark, was released in 2015 through Century Media. In 2018, they released their second album Nadir, after which their activity became infrequent.

== History ==
Black Tongue has its origins in a satirical straight edge song called "XCrucifixX" that Aaron Kitcher (drums) and Alex Teyen (vocals) posted on Soundcloud. The song inspired the pair to form a real band, leading to them hiring their school friends. This including Kitcher's Infant Annihilator bandmate Eddie Pickard (guitar). Other members had been in Acrania and Mister Sister Fister. They officially formed in Kingston upon Hull in 2013.

On 7 May, they released their debut EP Falsifier. On 8 May 2014, they released their second EP Born Hanged. Around this time, they support Suicide Silence on their UK headline tour alongside Thy Art Is Murder and Fit For An Autopsy. On 10 June, they announced they had signed to Century Media Records Between 12 and 25 July, they headlined a tour of Canada, with support from Lifeforms, Traitors, Villains and Galactic Pegasus. Between 26 July and 16 August, they headlined a tour of the United States supported by Villains, Dealey Plaza, Lifeforms and the Last Ten Seconds of Life. On 27 August, they released a music video for their song "Eclipse." On 2 September, they re-released Born Hanged and Falsifier as Born Hanged / Falsifier (Redux), released by Century Media.

In February 2015, Teyen was hospitalised after mistaking a tour bus door for a bathroom, falling out of the bus and sustaining injuries to his head and face. They subsequently dropped out of the rest of their tour with Veil of Maya, Chelsea Grin and Oceans Ate Alaska. Between 6 and 28 March, they were also set to tour the United States supporting Chelsea Grin, alongside Sworn In, the Family Ruin and Carnifex. However, following Teyen's injuries, the left the tour. They performed at South by So What festival in Texas in March. On 9 June, they released the single "L'appel du Vide", announcing it would be a part of their upcoming debut album. Between 12 and 27 June, they toured Australia supporting Make Them Suffer. On 25 August, they released the song "In the Wake ov the Wolf" as a single. They released their debut album The Unconquerable Dark on 4 September 2015 through Century Media. Between 10 October and 11 November, they were set to tour the United States supporting Carnifex alongside the Last Ten Seconds Of Life and Lorna Shore. On 7 October, it was announced that they could not perform at the beginning of the tour due to delays obtaining work permits. On 21 October, they announced their permits had been denied and they were not be performing on the tour.

On 19 September 2018, they released the single "Ultima Necat", announcing it would be a part of their second album Nadir, which released on 26 October. Around this time, Teyen formed Beyond Extinction. Between 24 September and 3 October 2021, they headlined a tour of the United Kingdom. Between 25 January and 27 February 2022, they toured Europe supporting Decapitated.

== Musical style ==
Critics have categorised Black Tongue's music as deathcore, doomcore and downtempo deathcore. They incorporate elements of sludge metal, doom metal, djent, death doom, grindcore, black metal, particularly its atmospherics, Metal Hammer writer Adam Brennan noted them as "Reincarnating the rich heritage of bleak doom metal from Northern England".

Their songs are often based around breakdowns, as well as making use of palm-muted open notes, atmospheric elements, prolonged screams, ambient guitars, sludge metal riffs, slam death metal riffs, syncopation, blast beats and screaming. Their tempos were often lower than most deathcore bands and placed a greater emphasis on grooves and mechanical production.

=== Legacy ===
Black Tongue were one of the most influential deathcore bands of their time. Following the release of Falsifier, many acts in the genre began to emulate its style of groove-based, low-tempo, low-tuning deathcore. At the time, deathcore was largely derivative, with Black Tongue being one of the few bands to expand the genre.

Black Tongue are a pioneer of the deathcore subgenre downtempo deathcore (also known as sludgewave), which merges deathcore with elements of doom metal. The genre makes use of slow tempos, sometimes below 40bpm, guitars tuned an octave lower than standard, dissonant guitar work, ambient synths, use of whammy pedals and breakdowns making up the majority of the songs. It was particularly pushed by the record label We Are Triumphant, including groups such as Immortalist, Overthrower, Genocide District and Traitors.

They have been cited as an influence by Bodysnatcher.

== Members ==
- Alex Teyen – vocals
- Eddie Pickard – guitar
- James Harrison – guitar
- Lloyd Newton – bass
- Aaron Kitcher – drums

== Discography ==
Albums

- The Unconquerable Dark (2015)
- Nadir (2018)

EPs

- Falsifier (2013)
- Born Hanged (2014)
