= Eternal Nightmare (Chelsea Grin album) =

Studio album by Chelsea Grin
- Released: July 13, 2018
- Genre: Deathcore
- Length: 36:51
- Label: Rise
- Producer: Drew Fulk; Joshua Travis

Chelsea Grin chronology
Self Inflicted (2016)	Eternal Nightmare (2018)	Suffer in Hell (2022)

Singles from Eternal Nightmare
- 1. "Dead Rose" Released: April 27, 2018; 2. "Hostage" Released: June 1, 2018; 3. "See You Soon" Released: June 14, 2018

Professional ratings
Review scores
Source	Rating
AllMusic	2.5/5 stars
Exclaim!	9/10

Eternal Nightmare is the fifth studio album by American deathcore band Chelsea Grin. It was released on July 13, 2018. It is the first album from the band without either frontman Alex Koehler and guitarists Jacob Harmond and Dan Jones. The departure of Koehler also makes this release the first to not feature any founding members. It is also the first album that Chelsea Grin has recorded as a four-piece band, with ex-Lorna Shore vocalist Tom Barber joining the band on vocal duties. On April 27, 2018, Koehler confirmed this as well as his new solo act, Grudges, and Chelsea Grin released the lead single from the album, named "Dead Rose". The second single, "Hostage", was released on June 1, 2018. The third single, "See You Soon" was released on June 14, 2018. This is the band's last album to be released by Rise Records. This is also the last album to feature Pablo Viveros on drums as he took a hiatus from the band in 2021, eventually leaving in 2024, and was replaced by Josh Miller.

== Track listing ==
All tracks are written by Tom Barber, Stephen Rutishauser, David Flinn, Pablo Viveros and Drew Fulk.

No.	Title	Length
1.	"Dead Rose"	3:32
2.	"The Wolf"	2:16
3.	"Across the Earth"	3:54
4.	"See You Soon"	3:31
5.	"9:30am"	2:35
6.	"Limbs"	3:49
7.	"Scent of Evil"	3:55
8.	"Hostage"	3:15
9.	"Nobody Listened"	3:25
10.	"Outliers"	3:36
11.	"Eternal Nightmare"	3:04
Total length:		36:52

== Personnel ==
Chelsea Grin

- Tom Barber – lead vocals
- Stephen Rutishauser – guitars
- David Flinn – bass, lyrics
- Pablo Viveros – drums, backing vocals

Production

- Drew Fulk – production, composing, mixing, mastering
- Jeff Dunne – engineering, editing, mixing, mastering
- Joshua Travis – additional production and engineering
- Afif Andriansyah – cover art

== Charts ==
Chart (2018)	Peak position
US Billboard 200	171
US Top Hard Rock Albums (Billboard)	13
US Top Rock Albums (Billboard)	39
