= Red Abbott =

Former American indie band

- Origin: Boston, Massachusetts, U.S.
- Genres: Electronic, indie rock, indie pop, experimental, folk
- Years active: 2006–2008
- Past members: Bert Brown; Chip Means; Joe Madera

Red Abbott was an indie rock band from Boston. Their members were based in New York City, Boston, Massachusetts, and Portland, Maine. They created electronic rock by emailing elements of songs to each other. Their sole album, Having Fun Without You, was released in 2007.

== History ==
Bert Brown, Chip Means and Joe Madera formed Red Abbott in 2006. Although they operated Red Abbott from three remote cities, the band's members all grew up in the Boston area and initially met in high school.

Using home recording equipment, Brown, Means and Madera set to work emailing pieces of songs back and forth until they had completed their debut, Having Fun Without You. The process of editing the album's 12 tracks took eighteen months to complete. The band has noted in interviews that electronic rock band The Postal Service used a similar technique involving standard mail for their 2003 album Give Up.

Shortly after the album's release, the band played its first and only live concert, joined by former Radka drummer Shawn Hildonen.

The band has received considerable media attention for its email-only approach to songwriting and recording. Popular Mechanics featured the band in a series of stories on artists who use consumer electronics to create professional work. MTV in the United Kingdom picked up the band's music video for "The Spare Room," produced by Brown, and included it in rotation on the program 120 Minutes.

The band became inactive in 2008.

== Discography ==
- Having Fun Without You (2007, Broken Treehouse Music)

== Members ==
- Bert Brown – vocals, drums, synths, programming, bass
- Chip Means – vocals, guitars, bass, flute, keyboard, percussion
- Joe Madera – vocals, keyboards, bass, guitars, percussion
