= Chelsea Grin =

American deathcore band

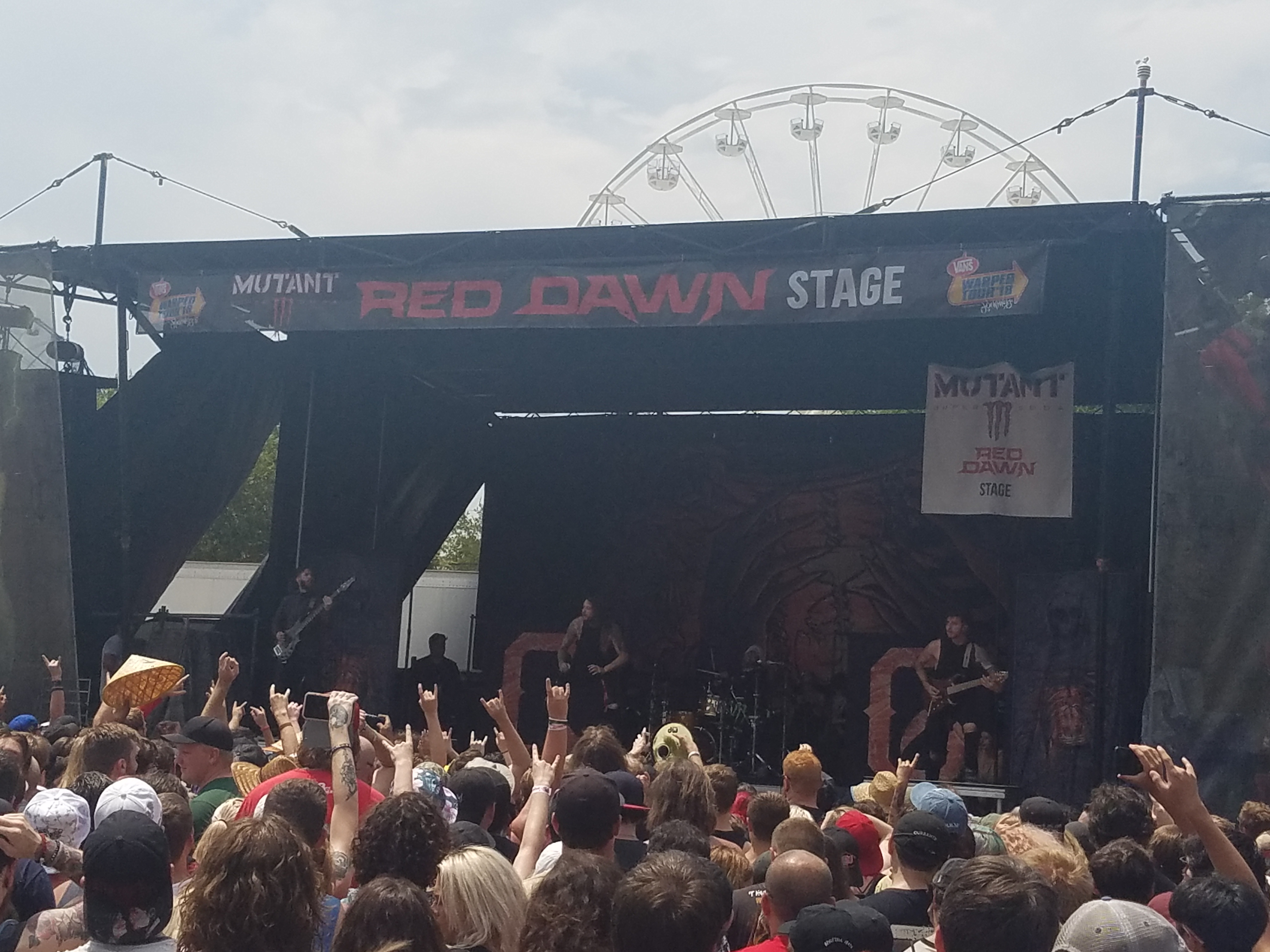
- Performing in June 2018

Background information
- Also known as: Ahaziah (2007–2008)
- Origin: Salt Lake City, Utah, U.S.
- Genre: Deathcore
- Years active: 2007–present
- Labels: ONErpm; Rise; Artery; Statik Factory
- Members: David Flinn; Stephen Rutishauser; Tom Barber; Josh Miller
- Past members: Austin Marticorena; Chris Kilbourn; Kory Shilling; Davis Pugh; Michael Stafford; Andrew Carlston; Jason Richardson; Dan Jones; Jake Harmond; Alex Koehler; Pablo Viveros

Chelsea Grin is an American deathcore band from Salt Lake City, Utah. Formed in 2007, the group have released two EPs and seven full-length albums. Since 2018, no founding members remain in the band. Despite not being in the original line-up, bassist David Flinn has been the only constant member on all the group's studio albums.

Chelsea Grin was originally founded under the name Ahaziah. The lineup for Ahaziah included vocalist Alex Koehler, guitarist Chris Kilbourn, bassist Austin Marticorena and lead guitarist Michael Stafford. Marticorena introduced Andrew Carlston to Chelsea Grin and assisted in rewriting their songs as well as the creation of new material as they changed the name to Chelsea Grin soon after. This writing process led to the tracks on their first release, a self-titled EP that was streamed and released online through iTunes, then released on CD worldwide on July 27, 2008. Early on in the band's career, they released the songs "Crewcabanger" and "Lifeless" as singles, both of which were received well by listening audiences on Myspace.

The band later sought to add a third guitarist position which led to the acquisition of Dan Jones and David Flinn which followed into the writing of their full-length album Desolation of Eden (2010), following up this record was My Damnation (2011) before cutting into a 2012 EP titled Evolve.

In 2013, Pablo Viveros replaced founding drummer Andrew Carlston and started contributing vocals to their music, allowing lead vocalist Koehler to focus solely on the screamed vocals while Viveros took on the mid to low-ranged growls. Since then, the band released two more full-lengths, Ashes to Ashes in 2014 and Self Inflicted in 2016. As of 2018, the band ended their longtime tenure of featuring three guitarists to now only featuring one. That same year, vocalist Koehler departed from the band and was replaced with former Lorna Shore vocalist Tom Barber. With this new four-piece lineup, Chelsea Grin officially released their fifth album Eternal Nightmare on July 13, 2018.

== History ==
=== Debut EP and deal with Artery Recordings (2008–2009) ===
Following the release and success of the self-titled EP in July 2008, the signing to Statik Factory Records, and a few small successful west coast tours, Austin Marticorena (bass) left the band for personal reasons. The band recruited Jake Harmond to temporarily fill in on bass while the band found a permanent member. Not long after this, the band ousted drummer Andrew Carlston, and Kory Shilling took his place, as well as Davis Pugh taking over the full-time bass player position. In April 2009, original drummer, Carlston returned to the band, replacing Shilling, and guitar player, and original member, Chris Kilbourn left the band to start his own record label, Matchless Records. Shortly thereafter, Jake Harmond once again filled in for the band, this time as substitute rhythm guitar player.

Soon after the band started to write the follow-up to the self-titled EP, they decided to take a new route and switch Davis Pugh from being bassist into being a third guitar player after David Flinn joined the band as bassist. The band then was added to a small, week-long Canadian run in June 2009 with The Agonist, A Plea for Purging, Arsonists Get All the Girls and Statik Factory labelmates, Attila. After the successful tour, fill-in guitar player Jake Harmond decided to become a full-time member, and the band joined into a contract with Artery Foundation representatives, Mike Milford and Eric Rushing whom then booked studio time for Chelsea Grin to record their debut full-length, Desolation of Eden at Lambesis Studios in San Marcos, California during August 2009. The album was produced by As I Lay Dying vocalist and studio founder, Tim Lambesis. One week prior to heading into the studio, guitar player Davis Pugh was kicked out of the band, and was replaced with ex-bandmate of Jake Harmond; Dan Jones, of another local Salt Lake City band, Hermione. Whilst in the studio the band signed a deal with Artery Recordings, a label that was imprinted between The Artery Foundation and Razor & Tie.

=== Desolation of Eden (2009–2010) ===
After recording their debut record, Desolation of Eden, the band embarked on their first full US tour featuring Dr. Acula, American Me, and Attila. Desolation of Eden was released on February 16, 2010, and reached number 21 on The Billboard Top Heatseekers Chart selling 1,500 copies its first week. With the success of their debut, the band was afterwards featured and praised in Alternative Press, Utah newspapers and many other magazines nationwide and worldwide.

In August 2010, while the band was in Richmond, Virginia on the Thrash and Burn tour, vocalist Alex Koehler received a serious injury to his jaw, having it fractured in three places, which required the band to drop off its final week. Koehler was rushed from the venue to receive surgery. Despite this, the band still carried out their two-week tour with Blind Witness and Attila on during September 2010, which had Koehler substituted with Adam Warren of Oceano.

One song that debuted on the band's self-titled EP; "Cheyne Stokes", was re-recorded for Desolation of Eden. The album has also peaked at 24 on the Billboard New Artists Chart. There are currently two music videos from the record, "Sonnet of the Wretched" and "Recreant". The music video for "Sonnet of the Wretched" was filmed on June 4, 2010, as the band headlined a sold-out show at The Boardwalk in Orangvale, CA, the video was then released on July 7, 2010. In 2010, while on tour with Iwrestledabearonce, Eyes Set to Kill, The Chariot and Vanna, the band recorded a music video for the single "Recreant" on a recording set held in Northern California, the video debuted January 13, 2011, on Metal Injection. Chelsea Grin confirmed Chris "Zeuss" Harris as the chosen producer for the recording of their follow-up album to My Damnation, and would enter the studio for its recording by January 13, 2011.

=== My Damnation and Evolve (2010–2012) ===
Chelsea Grin finished writing and recording their second full-length album in June 2011, where the title for it was revealed as being My Damnation. It was released the following month on July 19, 2011. On April 17 Artery Recordings released the title track as the album's lead single off the album, having a music video produced for it weeks later. The song "All Hail The Fallen King" featuring Phil Bozeman, vocalist of Whitechapel, also premiered before the record's release.

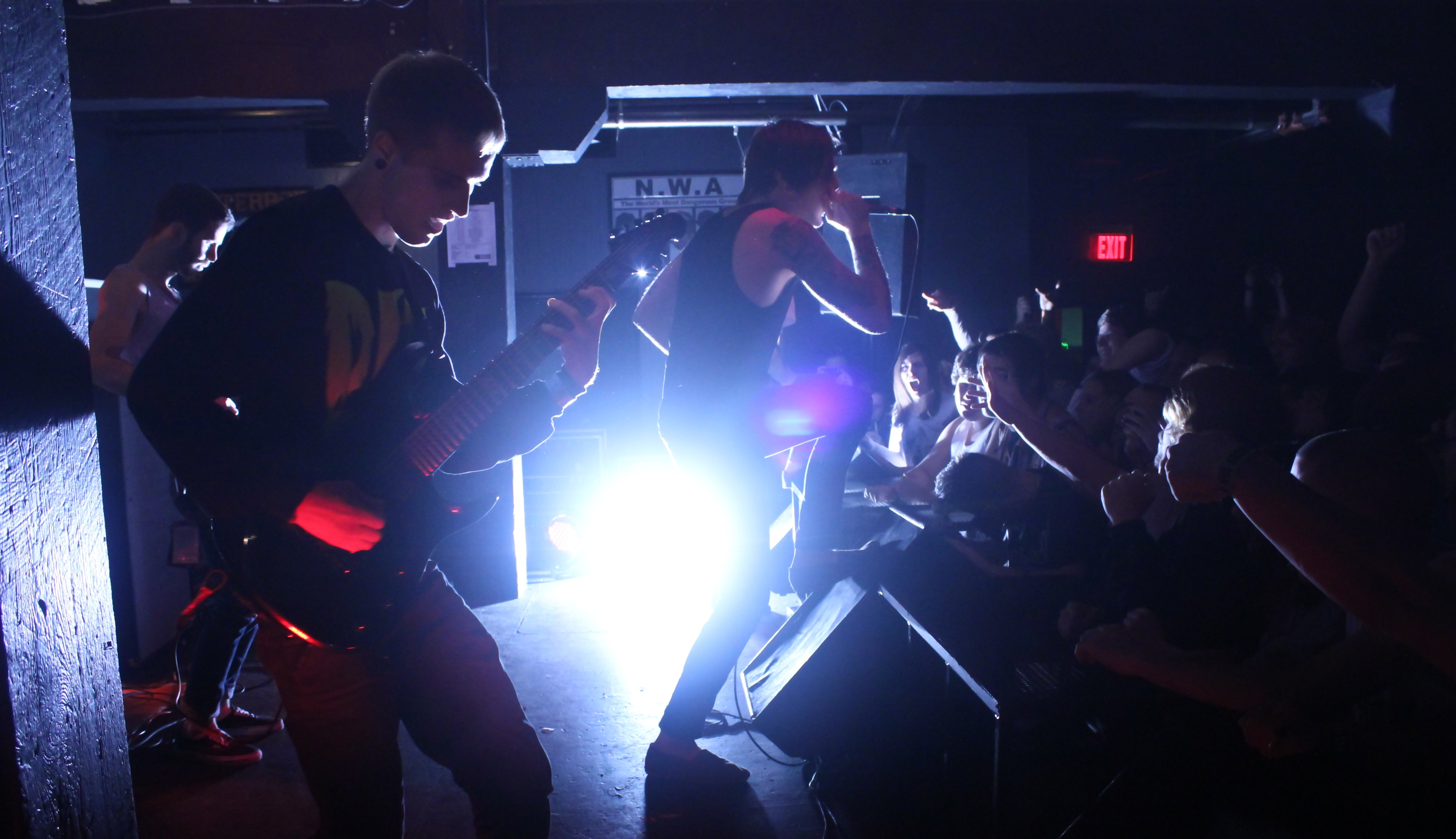
Performing on 2011's Thrash and Burn tour.

Chelsea Grin toured in-support of the album with Emmure and Attila before being included on the All Stars Tour, which featured those same bands and many others such as After the Burial, Born of Osiris and Motionless in White.

Chelsea Grin played the entire Warped Tour 2012. At the same time of the Warped Tour announcement, plans for releasing a 5-song EP were confirmed. During December of the year, lead guitarist, Michael Stafford left the band. Born of Osiris (and former All Shall Perish) guitarist, Jason Richardson took up Stafford's position until further notice. Stafford explained that he could not bear touring any more along with other reasons for the explanation of the departure. Less than a week later, Richardson was kicked out from Born of Osiris, and then immediately switched his position as a substitute member for Chelsea Grin to a permanent member.

Evolve was released June 19, 2012. Artery streamed a song from the upcoming EP, titled "Lilith" on May 9, 2012.

In the end of November 2012, Pablo Viveros joined Chelsea Grin on drums. During November and December 2012 Chelsea supported Motionless in White on their headline North American tour entitled "The Infamous Tour". The tour was a success with many dates being sold out. The band then did a short headline tour of North America in January. Chelsea Grin performed at the Soundwave Festival in Australia in February 2013, as well as two sidewave shows with Of Mice & Men and While She Sleeps.

=== Ashes to Ashes and Self Inflicted (2013–2018) ===
During March 2013 the band headlined a tour with Attila, Betraying the Martyrs, Within the Ruins and Buried in Verona for their second major headlining tour, "The Sick Tour 2". The band supported Emmure across Europe during April and May 2013. This was the band's 3rd time in Europe. Chelsea Grin performed at several European festivals over the summer months, Including the open air festival with Parkway Drive. They also played the All Stars 2013 tour alongside Every Time I Die. In June 2013, Chelsea Grin released a full cover of the song "Right Now" by Korn, produced by guitarist Dan Jones at the same time he graduated from his BSc Degree. At the end of June, they were announced as the main support on the Brothers in Arms tour alongside The Amity Affliction, Stick To Your Guns, and In Hearts Wake. The tour covered most capital cities of Australia in late October 2013.

The band officially entered the studio late November 2013, two years since their last album. The new album is entitled Ashes to Ashes and was released on July 8, 2014, via Artery Recordings/Razor & Tie. A song called Letters was leaked on December 17, 2013. The album was produced by Chelsea Grin and Diego Farias, guitarist from the band Volumes. The band has stated that the album "has the same amount of material as Desolation of Eden, My Damnation and Evolve… COMBINED." Frontman Alex Koehler stated that the lyrical content on Ashes to Ashes is much more positive than on the other records: "It's more about standing up for yourselves and not giving a fuck about anyone else's opinions. Every song is going to be based on real life: alcoholism, drug abuse, violence and everyday bullshit forced down our throats". Koehler described the album as "relentlessly heavy, with a touch of melody.". The album also saw the debut of drummer Pablo Viveros' co-vocals, allowing Koehler to focus on high ranged screams while Viveros took on the mid to low ranged vocals. On May 12, 2014, a lyric video for Angels Shall Sin, Demons Shall Pray was released. Another single for the album was released June 3, 2014, titled "Playing With Fire".

Chelsea Grin performed on Vans Warped Tour 2014. The music videos for their songs "Letters" and "Clockwork" were released on June 30, 2014, and July 17, 2014, respectively. The band later supported The Black Dahlia Murder and Suicide Silence on their co-headline North American tour in October 2014, and themselves co-headlined a European tour with Veil of Maya with support from Black Tongue and Oceans Ate Alaska in February 2015. They then headlined a North American tour in March 2015 with support from Carnifex, Sworn In and The Family Ruin, and have just finished a co-headlining a tour with The Word Alive, supported by Like Moths to Flames and Sylar. It was at that point where guitarist Dan Jones announced he will not be touring for Chelsea Grin for the rest of the year to pursue science. The band also acted as support for The Amity Affliction on their October 2015 tour as they joined up with Secrets, Cruel Hand and The Plot in You.

On September 21, 2015, Chelsea Grin announced that they will release a new record in mid-2016 (which they "promise ... will be [their] most extreme release to date") and that Jason Richardson parted ways with the band in favor of a solo effort, to be replaced on guitar by Stephen Rutishauser, who had been playing with the band since 2014. On December 10, 2015, they released the single "Skin Deep". Shortly after releasing the single, the band announced a tour in which their first full-length, "Desolation of Eden" would be played in its entirety. After the tour, they released the single "Clickbait" on May 4, 2016, along with announcing a new album "Self Inflicted", to be released July 1, 2016, through Rise Records. June 16 saw the release of "Broken Bonds", along with a music video to accompany it. The band then announced that they would be playing on the entire 2016 Vans Warped Tour. The band then opened up for Attila once again on there United States Chaos tour with Emmure & Sylar also rounding up the lineup.

Chelsea Grin also toured for Skin Deep throughout Europe in the Winter of 2017 with Betraying the Martyrs, Make them Suffer & Void of Vision as support. The United States portion started in the Spring of 2017 with Ice Nine Kills, Gideon & Enterprise Earth as support.

=== Line-up changes and Eternal Nightmare (2018–2022) ===
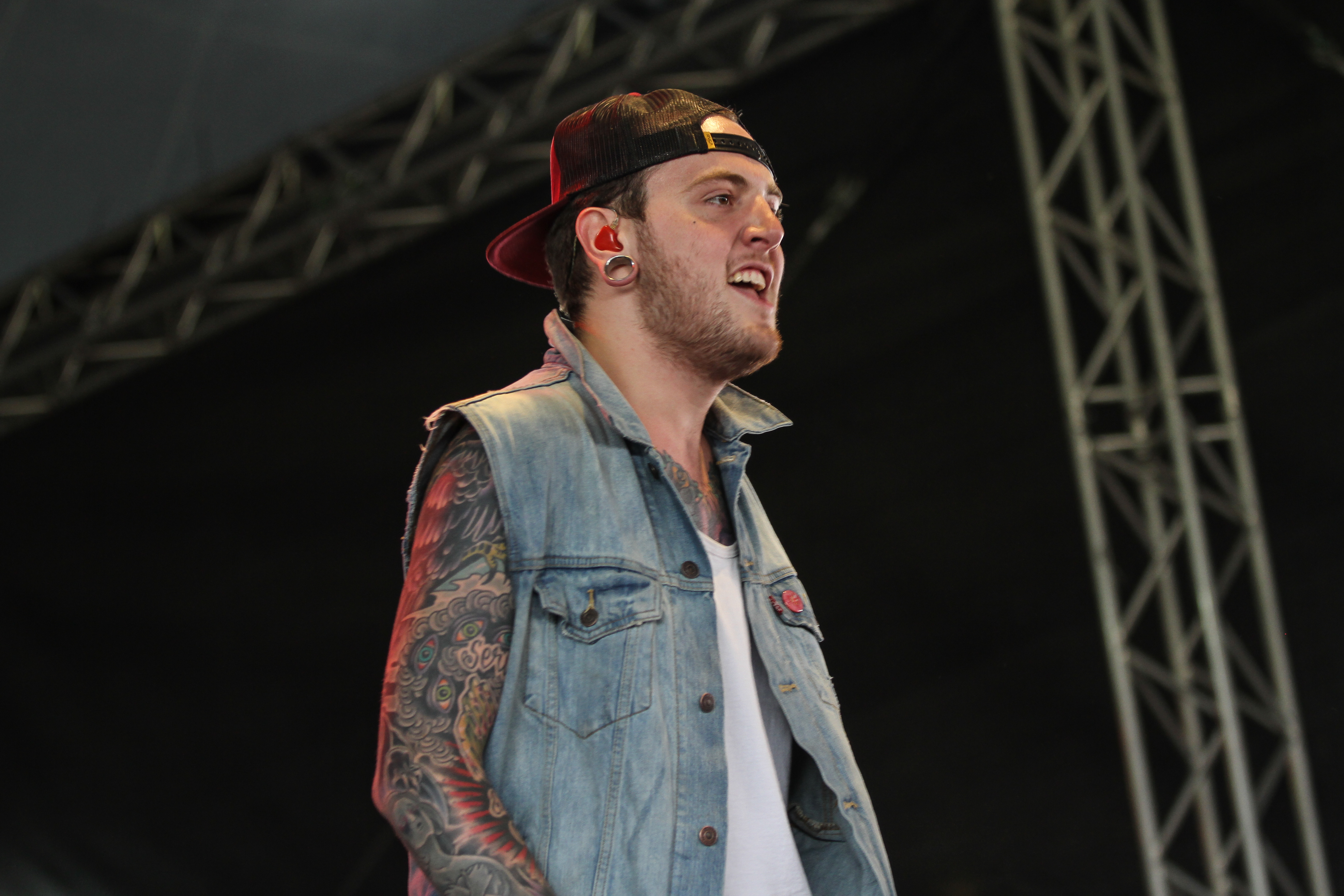
Founding vocalist Alex Koehler resigned from Chelsea Grin in 2018, and was replaced by Tom Barber.

On January 16, 2018, the band announced that they had entered the studio to begin recording a new album with producer Drew Fulk, along with Emmure's guitarist Josh Travis as a co-producer.

In early 2018, Chelsea Grin were scheduled to complete the North American "Graveyard Shift" tour alongside Motionless in White and Every Time I Die, however were forced to pull out due to lead vocalist Alex Koehler's declining health. It was also confirmed around this time that guitarist Dan Jones had also left due to his enrollment in medical school at the University of Utah. Dan Jones had not performed with the band since his last tour with the band at Warped Tour 2016.

On March 1, 2018, guitarist Jake Harmond confirmed via Twitter that he would no longer be part of the band. In a further tweet, Harmond cited family reasons for his departure.

Chelsea Grin declared that their fifth full-length, Eternal Nightmare, was officially finished in late March 2018. They stated that the record is "without hesitation our meanest, darkest, heaviest and most evil and honest creation to date." However, after this announcement, the group announced a month later (on April 27, 2018) that vocalist Alex Koehler is no longer a member of the band due to his struggle with alcoholism and mental health problems. The aforementioned announcement would imply that the record was recorded and finished with Koehler on vocals due to the order of which they were announced in, however this was later confirmed not to be the case as he was already replaced with the release of a music video for a new song entitled "Dead Rose" revealing Tom Barber of Lorna Shore as the new singer. The album was released on July 13, 2018.

On July 24, 2020, Chelsea Grin released a new song titled "Bleeding Sun". On November 13, the band released another new song titled "Blind Kings".

=== Suffer in Hell, Suffer in Heaven, and line-up changes (2022–present) ===
In August 2022, the band revealed that drummer Pablo Viveros (who has been on hiatus from the band since 2021) had made commitments with another artist in the downtime during the COVID-19 pandemic to perform and tour. They revealed he was still a member of the band, but would continue to take a hiatus from the band to fulfill his commitments. Around the same time, the band announced they would be releasing a double album, which will be split as two separate releases. The first album, Suffer in Hell, was released on November 11, while the second album, Suffer in Heaven, was released on March 17, 2023. The first installment, Suffer in Hell, released to critical acclaim, with Boolin Tunes referring to it as "an absolute deathcore masterclass" and the band's "finest work to date."

On September 24, 2022, a music video for the second single from Suffer in Hell, "The Isnis", was released. It is the first video to feature Nathan Pearson, who is currently taking the place of Pablo Viveros while he is on hiatus from the band.

On April 7, 2024, the band announced that they had mutually parted ways with Pablo Viveros and his session/touring replacement Nathan Pearson. Viveros' replacement was announced as Josh Miller, who is the former drummer for Emmure and Spite, and also the current drummer for Darko US, which features bandmate Tom Barber.

Chelsea Grin co-headlined Michigan Metal Fest in August 2025 with Hatebreed and Hed PE. The band are confirmed to be making an appearance at Welcome to Rockville, which will take place in Daytona Beach, Florida in May 2026. In June of that year lead singer Tom Barber revealed that the band would be releasing their 8th studio album in early 2027. Chelsea Grin will support Whitechapel on their 20th anniversary North American tour in the Fall of 2026.

== Musical style and influences ==
Chelsea Grin's musical style has been primarily described as deathcore. Their second album, My Damnation, also demonstrates doom and black metal influences on some songs, featuring non-palm muted dissonant tremolo picking and themes of Hell and damnation. Additionally, their second EP, Evolve, features more prominent uses of technical guitar playing due to the addition of guitarist Jason Richardson. It also saw the band beginning to incorporate some symphonic and electronic elements. Chelsea Grin have cited bands such as Suicide Silence, Whitechapel, Bury Your Dead, Emmure, American Me, Slayer, Megadeth, A Perfect Circle and Scars of Tomorrow as their influences.

Chelsea Grin also self-identify as deathcore, and when asked in an interview about the band's view on the label, former guitarist Jake Harmond said: "Everyone likes to flap their jaw and voice their own opinion how 'embarrassing' it is to be in a band that can be labeled 'deathcore,' but honestly we have never given a fuck."

== Band members ==
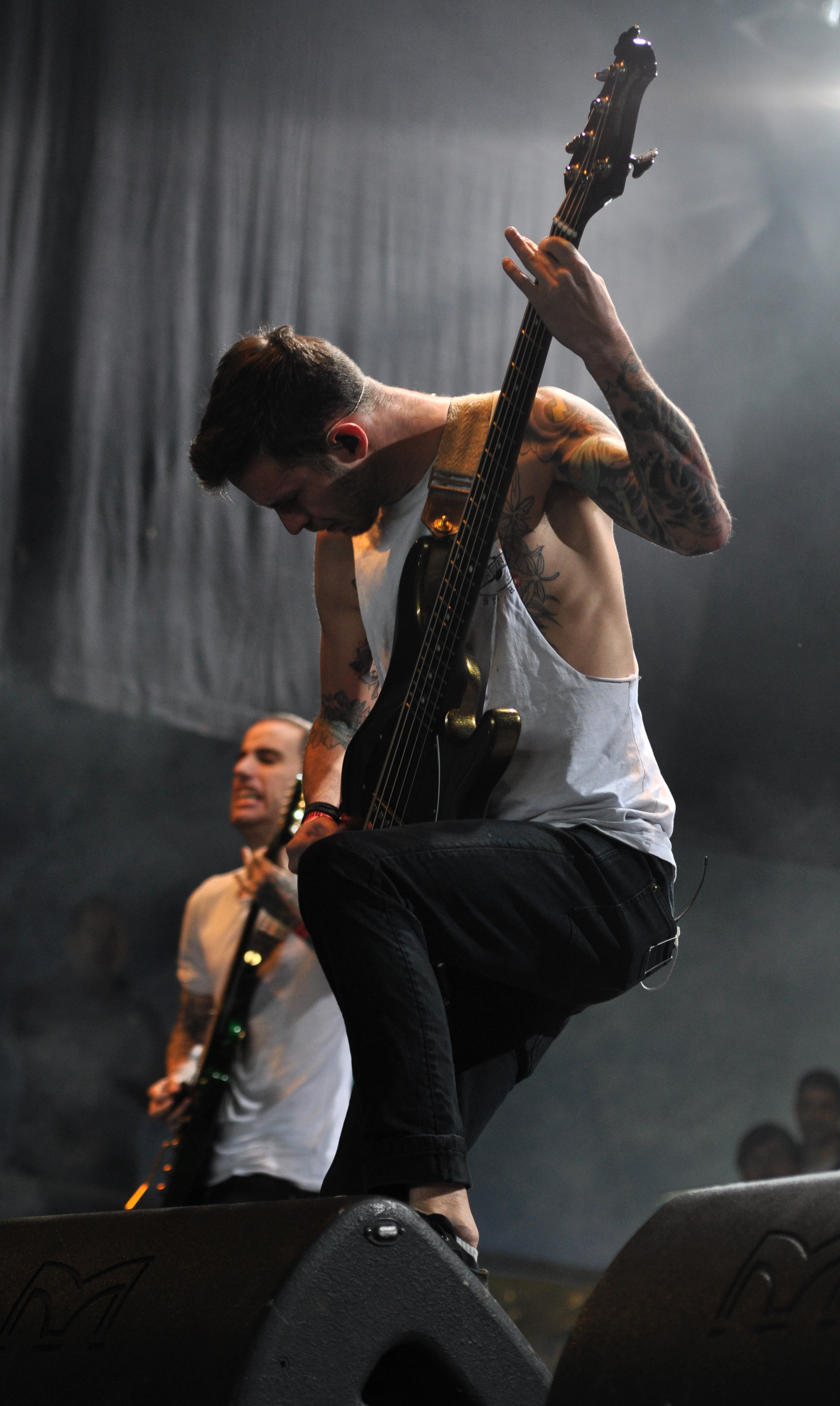
Bassist David Flinn and guitarist Jake Harmond (back) performing in 2013.

Current

- David Flinn – bass (2009–present)
- Stephen Rutishauser – guitars (2015–present; touring 2014–2015)
- Tom Barber – lead vocals (2018–present; touring 2017)
- Josh Miller – drums (2024–present)

Former

- Austin Marticorena – bass (2007–2008)
- Chris Kilbourn – guitars (2007–2009)
- Kory Shilling – drums (2009)
- Davis Pugh – bass (2008–2009); guitars (2009) (died 2013)
- Michael Stafford – guitars, backing vocals (2007–2011)
- Andrew Carlston – drums (2007–2009, 2009–2012)
- Jason Richardson – guitars, keyboards, programming (2012–2015)
- Dan Jones – guitars (2009–2017)
- Jake Harmond – guitars (2009–2018); bass (2008; session/touring)
- Alex Koehler – lead vocals (2007–2018)
- Pablo Viveros – drums, backing vocals (2012–2024)

Live / session

- Adam Warren – lead vocals (2010)
- Ronnie Garcia – guitars (2017)
- Tyler Dennen – lead vocals (2017)
- Nathan Pearson – drums (2022–2024)

Timeline

== Discography ==
=== Studio albums ===
List of studio albums, with selected chart positions
Title	Details	Peak chart positions				
Title	Details	US	US Heat.	US Indie.	US Rock	US Hard Rock
Desolation of Eden	Released: February 16, 2010; Label: Artery; Formats: CD, digital download	—	21	—	—	—
My Damnation	Released: July 19, 2011; Label: Artery; Formats: CD, digital download, vinyl	64	—	9	16	6
Ashes to Ashes	Released: July 8, 2014; Label: Artery; Formats: CD, digital download, 2x LP (vinyl)	27	—	3	8	4
Self Inflicted	Released: July 1, 2016; Label: Rise; Formats: CD, digital download, vinyl	105	—	6	11	2
Eternal Nightmare	Released: July 13, 2018; Label: Rise; Formats: CD, digital download, vinyl	171	—	6	39	13
Suffer in Hell	Released: November 11, 2022; Label: ONErpm; Formats: CD, digital download, vinyl	—	—	—	—	—
Suffer in Heaven	Released: March 17, 2023; Label: ONErpm; Formats: CD, digital download, vinyl	—	—	—	—	—
"—" denotes a recording that did not chart or was not released in that territory.

=== EPs ===
List of EPs, with selected chart positions
Title	Details	Peak chart positions			
Title	Details	US	US Indie.	US Rock	US Hard Rock
Chelsea Grin	Released: July 27, 2008; Label: Statik Factory; Formats: CD, digital download	—	—	—	—
Evolve	Released: June 19, 2012; Label: Artery; Formats: CD, digital download	62	13	27	4
"—" denotes a recording that did not chart or was not released in that territory.

=== Music videos ===
Year	Title	Director	From the album
2010	"Sonnet of the Wretched"	Stefan Anderson	Desolation of Eden
2011	"Recreant"	Stefan Anderson	Desolation of Eden
2011	"My Damnation"	Ramon Boutviseth	My Damnation
2012	"The Foolish One"	James Sharrock	My Damnation
2012	"Don't Ask, Don't Tell"	Stefan Anderson	Evolve
2014	"Clockwork"	Ryan Sheehy	Ashes to Ashes
2014	"Playing with Fire"	Ryan Sheehy	Ashes to Ashes
2016	"Broken Bonds"	Max Moore	Self Inflicted
2018	"Dead Rose"	Brandon Barone, Sam Shapiro	Eternal Nightmare
2018	"Hostage"	Sam Shapiro	Eternal Nightmare
2020	"Blind Kings"	Tim Burton (not that one)	Non-album single
2022	"Origin of Sin"	Eric DiCarlo	Suffer in Hell
2022	"The Isnis"	Eric DiCarlo	Suffer in Hell
2022	"Forever Bloom"	Eric DiCarlo	Suffer in Hell
2023	"Fathomless Maw"	Eric DiCarlo	Suffer in Heaven

== Concert tours ==
- Metal Goes Metro (July 26 – August 18, 2008)
- The Santa Gets Owned Tour (December 19 – January 5, 2009)
- The No Care Ever Canadian Tour (June 18–29, 2009)
- The Grand Slam All You Can Beat Tour (September 18 – October 29, 2009)
- The Grand Slam All You Can Beat Canadian Tour (October 31 – November 7, 2009)
- Within the Ruins Tour (November 8 – December 10, 2009)
- Burgers & Bowling Tour (February 11 – March 14, 2010)
- Road to Metalfest (April 9 – May 10, 2010)
- The Thrash and Burn Tour 2010 (July 16 – August 15, 2010)
- The Too Cool for School Tour (September 3–14, 2010)
- The Ghostbustour (September 23 – October 24, 2010)
- Across the Nation Tour (November 5–27, 2010)
- The Welcome to Hell Tour (February 10 – March 25, 2011)
- Ignite the World Tour (April 11–30, 2011)
- The All Stars Tour (July 21 – August 23, 2011)
- The Artery Foundation Across the Nation Europe 2011 (October 19 – November 5, 2011)
- The Thrash and Burn Tour 2011 (November 10 – December 15, 2011)
- The Still Reckless Tour (January 12 – February 18, 2012)
- The Sick Tour (March 3 – April 20, 2012)
- Warped Tour 2012 (June 16 – August 5, 2012)
- South American Tour (September 22–30, 2012)
- The Infamous Tour (November 8 – December 16, 2012)
- Done Dirty Clothing Tour (January 18–26, 2013)
- Soundwave 2013 (February 23 – March 4, 2013)
- The Sick Tour 2 (March 9–30, 2013)
- The Mosh Lives Tour (April 6 – May 4, 2013)
- Euro Summer Tour 2013 (June 19–30, 2013)
- The All Stars Tour 2013 (July 19 – August 17, 2013)
- Bury The Hatchet Tour 2014 (January 15 – February 14, 2014)
- Warped Tour 2014 (June 13 – August 3, 2014)
- The Blackcraft Tour (October 3–30, 2014)
- The Moving On Tour (November - December 2014)
- The Ashes to Ashes Tour (February 2–28, 2015)
- The Real Sick Tour (April 28 – May 23, 2015)
- Desolation of Eden Tour (Feb 19 – March 19, 2016)
- Warped Tour 2016 (June 24 – August 13, 2016)
- The Chaos Tour 2016 (October 18 – November 18, 2016)
- The Self Inflicted European Tour (February 3 – March 5, 2017)
- The Self Inflicted American Tour (March 21 – April 28, 2017)
- Chelsea Grin European Summer 2017 (June 15 – August 20, 2017)
- UK Tech-Fest (July 6 – 10, 2017)
- Impericon Never Say Die Tour (November 2 – 26, 2017)
- The Graveyard Shift Tour UK (January 10 – 28, 2018) *cancelled appearance
- The Graveyard Shift Tour US (February 20 – March 25, 2018) *cancelled appearance
- Warped Tour 2018 (June 21 – August 5, 2018)
- The Eternal Nightmare European Tour 2018 (September 21 – October 13, 2018)

== Awards ==
Loudwire Music Awards

Year	Nominee / work	Award	Result
2012	"Lilith"	Death Match Hall of Fame	Won
