= Dingir (album) =

Studio album by Rings of Saturn
- Released: February 5, 2013
- Studio: Mayhemness Studios, Sacramento, California
- Genre: Deathcore; technical death metal
- Length: 41:38
- Label: Unique Leader
- Producer: Bob Swanson

Rings of Saturn chronology
Embryonic Anomaly (2010)	Dingir (2013)	Lugal Ki En (2014)

Dingir ( /dɪnˈdʒɪər/) is the second studio album by American deathcore band Rings of Saturn. It was produced by Bob Swanson at Mayhemness Studios located in Sacramento, California. It was originally due for release on November 20, 2012, but due to legal issues, the release of the physical CD was pushed to February 5, 2013. In response to the legal push back and a pre-production version of the album leaking, the vocalist uploaded the completed album, in its entirety, on his YouTube channel, along with a download link. It is the first album with Ian Bearer on vocals, Joel Omans on guitar, Sean Martinez on bass, and Ian Baker on drums after the departure of Peter Pawlak and Brent Silletto, the band's founding vocalist and drummer, respectively.

== Promotion and release ==
The album was originally planned for a release on November 20, 2012, but legal issues had pushed the album back to February 5, 2013. It turned out that the trademark of their name was owned by another group. The band commented on their struggle with this lesson in a post to Facebook on November 17.

"For those of you who are curious as to what our "legal issues" were that halted the production of Dingir, and pushed [its] official release date from Nov. 20th, 2012 to Feb 5th, 2013, we are able to explain them now. A third party was legally fighting us for the rights to our name using a loop hole method that renders the protection of our copyright obsolete in that specific circumstance. After butt loads of money was dropped in attorney and legal fees, we were able to keep our name as well as take precautions to ensure that this sort of thing never happens to us again. During this time, someone leaked an unfinished, poor quality pre-production version of our album months before our new release date. In light of the album being pushed back, and the leak, we decided to just stream the entire high quality finished version of the album on Youtube for everyone, as well as make it available for download, and put up the guitar tabs on ultimate-guitar.com for people who were interested in learning our songs. We know you guys had been waiting for the album long enough, and we would rather have you all jam out to the high quality finished album, then a poor quality unfinished product. This third party that was trying to steal our name away from us, and got our albums release date pushed back will not be named, because we know that you guys will go absolutely apeshit on them for doing that to us. We have full trust that you guys will support the band and still pick up a copy of Dingir when our album drops on Feb. 5th, 2013 so that we can hit the road again on tour, and hang out, and play for all of you guys! We are currently working on pre-order packages, a music video, and something else special for everyone that we will be releasing starting on our album's original release date of Nov. 20th, 2012!"

== Track listing ==
No.	Title	Length
1.	"Objective to Harvest"	4:04
2.	"Galactic Cleansing"	3:27
3.	"Shards of Scorched Flesh"	3:08
4.	"Dingir"	3:35
5.	"Faces Imploding"	5:50
6.	"Peeling Arteries"	4:05
7.	"Hyperforms"	3:50
8.	"Fruitless Existence"	3:13
9.	"Immaculate Order"	4:36
10.	"Utopia" (instrumental)	5:26
Total length:		41:38

== Personnel ==
Rings of Saturn

- Ian Bearer – vocals
- Lucas Mann – guitars, keyboards, synthesizers, programming
- Joel Omans – guitars
- Sean Martinez – bass
- Ian Baker – drums

Additional musicians

- John Galloway – keyboards, synthesizers, programming

Additional personnel

- Bob Swanson – production, mixing, mastering
- Nick Mahar – photography
