= Evolve (EP) =

EP by Chelsea Grin
- Released: June 19, 2012
- Recorded: 2012
- Studios: High Vibe Recordings, Salt Lake City, Utah
- Genres: Deathcore; progressive metalcore
- Length: 20:53
- Label: Artery
- Producers: Jason Suecof; Eyal Levi

Chelsea Grin chronology
My Damnation (2011)	Evolve (2012)	Ashes to Ashes (2014)

Professional ratings
Review scores
Source	Rating
About.com	3.5/5 stars
Absolute Punk	54%
Alternative Press	2/5 stars
Revolver	4/5

Evolve is the second EP by American deathcore band Chelsea Grin, released on June 19, 2012 through Artery Recordings. It is the first release by the band with guitarist Jason Richardson taking up lead guitar since his departure from Born of Osiris and the last release to feature Andrew Carlston on drums. Evolve was mixed by Jason Suecof and was engineered by famed metal producer and Dååth guitarist, Eyal Levi.

== Style ==
Musically, the album features slight progressive influence along with blending more melody when compared to their previous releases.

== Background ==
Chelsea Grin first confirmed work for a new EP at the end of 2011. Soon after this announcement, founding lead guitarist Michael Stafford left the band and was replaced by Jason Richardson of Born of Osiris as a touring member, before Richardson left Born of Osiris while out on tour with the band; which in turn resulted in him joining Chelsea Grin full-time. On May 9, 2012, Artery began streaming the song "Lilith".

Evolve was tracked by Bucket at High Vibe Recordings, mixed by Jason Suecof at Audio Hammer Studios, and engineered by Dååth guitarist Eyal Levi.

== Track listing ==
No.	Title	Length
1.	"The Second Coming"	4:40
2.	"Lilith"	4:00
3.	"S.H.O.T."	3:23
4.	"Confession"	3:29
5.	"Don't Ask, Don't Tell"	5:21
Total length:		20:53

Physical format bonus tracks
No.	Title	Length
6.	"The Human Condition (Remix)"	4:05
Total length:		24:58

== Personnel ==
Chelsea Grin

- Alex Koehler – vocals
- Jason Richardson – lead guitar, programming
- Jacob Harmond – guitar
- Dan Jones – guitar
- David Flinn – bass
- Andrew Carlston – drums

Production

- Engineering by Eyal Levi
- Mixing by Jason Suecof, @ Audio Hammer Studios
- Tracking by Buckett
- Layout by Mike Milford

== Charts ==
Chart	Peak position
U.S. Billboard 200	62
U.S. Billboard Rock Albums	27
U.S. Billboard Independent Albums	13
U.S. Billboard Hard Rock Albums	4
