= Infant Annihilator =

Deathcore band from England and the USA

- The band's logo, which was drawn by guitarist Eddie Pickard.

Background information
- Origin: Kingston upon Hull, East Riding of Yorkshire, United Kingdom
- Genres: Deathcore; technical death metal
- Years active: 2012–present
- Spinoffs: Black Tongue
- Members: Aaron Kitcher; Eddie Pickard; Dickie Allen
- Past members: Dan Watson
- Website: Infant Annihilator on Facebook

Infant Annihilator are an English-American deathcore band formed in Hull, East Riding of Yorkshire in 2012 by drummer Aaron Kitcher and guitarist Eddie Pickard. The group is recognized for its technical and extreme style, incorporating eclectic compositional elements, as well as for its satirical, provocative lyrics and shock-oriented humor. Their music videos frequently feature irreverent and ribald imagery.

Although the two founding members are English, the band’s vocalist has consistently been American. Their debut album, The Palpable Leprosy of Pollution (2012), featured Indiana-born vocalist Dan Watson and was released later that year. Following a lineup change, Massachusetts native Dickie Allen assumed vocals. The band’s second album, The Elysian Grandeval Galèriarch (2016), was recorded and mixed by Jesse Kirkbride at his home studio, Kirkbride Recordings. Their third studio album, The Battle of Yaldabaoth, was released on 11 September 2019.

Hysteria Magazine described Infant Annihilator as an Internet band and even though they have stated that touring is a possibility, they have performed only as a studio project so far.

== History ==
=== Formation and The Palpable Leprosy of Pollution (2012–2013) ===
Infant Annihilator were formed in 2012 in Hessle near Kingston upon Hull by guitarist Eddie Pickard and drummer Aaron Kitcher. The name came from a song of the same title composed by Kitcher's previous band, As the Blessed Fall, and was chosen to parody death metal band name stereotypes. In a 2016 interview, they explained, "We wanted the song names and band name to be as completely over-the-top as our music..."

Pickard and Kitcher wrote and created homemade recordings using recording software on Pickard's computer. They wrote, recorded and edited the instrumental tracks for their debut album, The Palpable Leprosy of Pollution (abbreviated The PLOP). After releasing instrumental songs online, the pair met American vocalist Dan Watson from Indiana online, who discovered Infant Annihilator on Facebook. Pickard and Kitcher were impressed with his performance and asked him to sing on the album. They garnered viral popularity online—growing to around 20,000 "likes" within a month—with the release of the music video for their song "Decapitation Fornication".

Following the release of the video, the group promoted their debut album The Palpable Leprosy of Pollution, released on 12 December 2012 (12/12/12). Watson pitched the idea to release the album on 12/12/12. Watson has retrospectively regretted the release date, as it caused him to rush his work to get the album released on time, leaving him unhappy with his vocals.

Watson left the band in late 2013 and publicly announced his departure from the band on 22 February 2014. He explained that he left because he did not feel equal to the other two members, and because he was upset over the two members agreeing to a contract without consulting him. After leaving, Watson formed the Washington-based deathcore group Enterprise Earth with former Takeover guitarist BJ Sampson.

=== Allen's arrival and The Elysian Grandeval Galèriarch (2014–2017) ===
In late 2014, while drumming for fellow UK band Desolated during their first US tour, Kitcher met vocalist Dickie Allen. The tour line-up included the band Traitors, who had brought Allen along with them. Hearing Allen's vocals convinced Kitcher that he was a good fit for the band. Infant Annihilator announced via social media on 1 June 2016 that Allen was their new singer.

Infant Annihilator's second album, The Elysian Grandeval Galèriarch (abbreviated The EGG), was officially released 29 July 2016. The album was Infant Annihilator's first to chart, making it onto several Billboard charts, including the Top Heatseekers, Independent Albums, Top Album Sales, Top Rock Albums, and Top Hard Rock Albums charts.

=== The Battle of Yaldabaoth (2019–2023) ===
On 25 July, Infant Annihilator posted a music video for their first single, "Three Bastards", to YouTube, along with the upcoming album's release date, title, art, track list, and preorder information. The Battle of Yaldabaoth (abbreviated The BOY) was released on 11 September, coinciding with Kitcher's 29th birthday.

=== Mister Sister Fister: Re-Conception EP and The Somnial Plunge into Cyclic Ebullition (2024–present) ===
On 15 October 2024, Infant Annihilator released the EP Mister Sister Fister: Re-Conception, a remake of a release from Mister Sister Fister, a band that Pickard and Kitcher had been a part of. The EP included vocals by Allen and Alex Teyen. They revealed that a fourth studio album was in the works.

On 16 October 2026, Infant Annihilator posted a YouTube short announcing the upcoming fourth album with a release date of 1 December 2026. On 23 October 2026, they posted another YouTube short revealing that the album will be called The Somnial Plunge into Cyclic Ebullition (abbreviated SPICE).

== Musical style and influences ==
Infant Annihilator's musical style has been described as both deathcore and technical death metal. Their lyrical content is intentionally extreme and covers controversial topics such as rape, pedophilia, murder, infanticide, "mass programming", religion, cult, and the Catholic Church. These topics are derived from the history of sexual abuse in the Catholic Church. In September 2017, their music was deemed "too offensive" and was pulled from the online music streaming platforms Spotify and iTunes as a result. They were returned to both platforms after three days.

They have listed various subgenres of death metal and hardcore punk to be influential to their music, including: deathcore, slam death metal, technical death metal, “down-tempo hardcore”, grindcore and mathcore.

Artists they have taken influence from include Carnifex, Bring Me the Horizon (particularly their older deathcore style), System of a Down, Slipknot, Chimaira, Despised Icon, Thy Art Is Murder, The Black Dahlia Murder, Beneath the Massacre, Cattle Decapitation, Waking the Cadaver, and GG Allin.

== Band members ==
Current

- Aaron Kitcher – drums (2012–present)
- Eddie Pickard – guitars, bass (2012–present)
- Dickie Allen – vocals (2016–present)

Former

- Dan Watson – vocals (2012–2014)

== Discography ==
=== Studio albums ===
List of studio albums, with selected chart positions
Year	Album details	Peak chart positions				
Year	Album details	US Hard Rock	US Rock	US Top Sales	US Ind.	US Heat.
2012	The Palpable Leprosy of Pollution: Released: 12 December 2012; Label: Self-released/Total Deathcore; Format: CD, LP (limited-print re-release), digital download	—	—	—	—	—
2016	The Elysian Grandeval Galèriarch: Released: 29 July 2016; Label: Self-released; Format: CD, CS, LP, digital download	7	22	90	14	4
2019	The Battle of Yaldabaoth: Released: 11 September 2019; Label: Self-released; Format: CD, 2×LP, digital download	11	22	54	20	6
2026	The Somnial Plunge into Cyclic Ebullition: Released: 1 December 2026; Label: Self-released; Format: Digital download	—	—	—	—	—
"—" denotes releases that did not chart or were not released in that country.

=== Extended plays ===
- Mister Sister Fister: Re-Conception (2024)

=== Singles ===
- "Decapitation Fornication" (23 July 2012)
- "Pray for Plagues" [Bring Me the Horizon cover] (11 January 2013)
- "Motherless Miscarriage" (22 June 2016)
- "Three Bastards" (25 July 2019)
- "Swinaecologist" (31 August 2019)
