= Lorna Shore discography =

Recording collections by American deathcore band

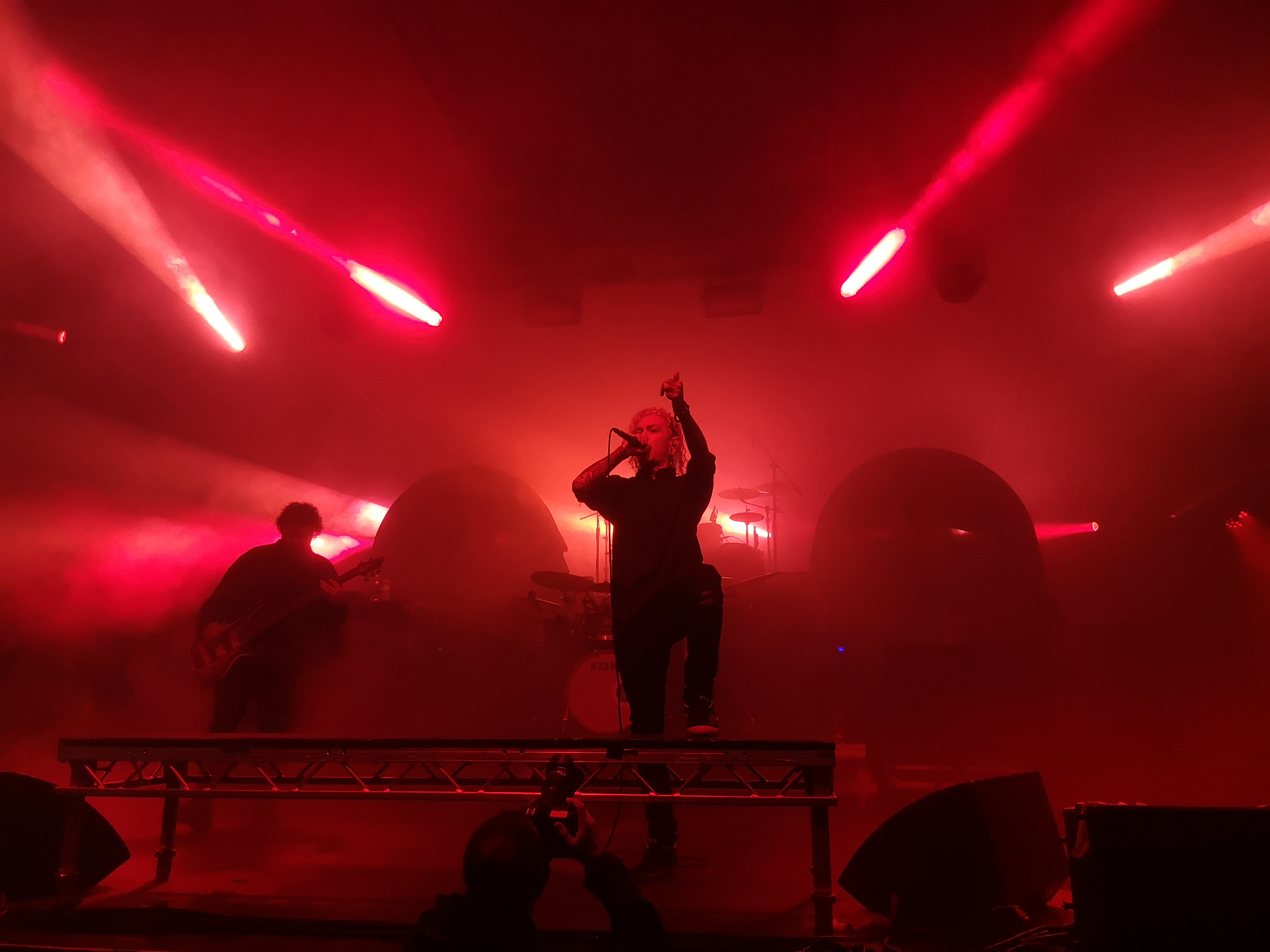
- Lorna Shore in 2022
- Studio albums: 5
- EPs: 4
- Singles: 23
- Music videos: 26

American deathcore band Lorna Shore has released five studio albums, four EPs, twenty-three singles, and twenty-six music videos.

== Studio albums ==
List of studio albums, with selected chart positions
Title	Album details	Peak chart positions			
Title	Album details	US	US Heat.	AUS	GER
Psalms	Released: June 9, 2015; Label: Density	—	23	—	—
Flesh Coffin	Released: February 17, 2017; Label: Outerloop	—	3	—	—
Immortal	Released: January 31, 2020; Label: Century Media	—	—	—	90
Pain Remains	Released: October 14, 2022; Label: Century Media	150	—	77	6
I Feel the Everblack Festering Within Me	Released: September 12, 2025; Label: Century Media	129	—	14	4

== Extended plays ==
List of extended plays
Title	Extended play details
Triumph	Released: October 7, 2010; Label: Self-released
Bone Kingdom	Released: February 16, 2012; Label: Self-released
Maleficium	Released: December 20, 2013; Label: Self-released
...And I Return to Nothingness	Released: August 13, 2021; Label: Century Media

== Singles ==
List of singles, with selected chart positions, showing year released and album name
Year	Title	Peak positions		Album
Year	Title	US Hard Rock	US Hard Digi.	Album
2010	"Karen's Place"	—	—	Non-album single
2011	"Bone Kingdom"	—	—	Bone Kingdom
2011	"Life of Fear"	—	—	Bone Kingdom
2013	"Accumulatory Genophage"	—	—	Maleficium
2013	"Godmaker"	—	—	Maleficium
2015	"Grimoire"	—	—	Psalms
2015	"The Absolution of Hatred"	—	—	Non-album single
2016	"Denounce the Light"	—	—	Flesh Coffin
2017	"Fvneral Moon"	—	—	Flesh Coffin
2019	"Darkest Spawn"	—	—	Immortal
2019	"This Is Hell"	—	—	Immortal
2019	"Death Portrait"	—	—	Immortal
2019	"Immortal"	—	—	Immortal
2020	"King ov Deception"	—	—	Immortal
2021	"To the Hellfire"	—	—	...And I Return to Nothingness
2022	"Sun//Eater"	—	—	Pain Remains
2022	"Into the Earth"	—	—	Pain Remains
2022	"Cursed to Die"	—	—	Pain Remains
2022	"Pain Remains I: Dancing Like Flames"	—	—	Pain Remains
2022	"Pain Remains II: After All I've Done, I'll Disappear"	—	—	Pain Remains
2025	"Oblivion"	18	9	I Feel the Everblack Festering Within Me
2025	"Unbreakable"	—	—	I Feel the Everblack Festering Within Me
2025	"Prison of Flesh"	—	—	I Feel the Everblack Festering Within Me

== Music videos ==
List of music videos, showing year released and director
Year	Title	Album	Director(s)
2013	"Godmaker"	Maleficium	Dan Newman
2014	"Cre(H)ate"	Maleficium	Jeremy Tremp
2015	"Grimoire"	Psalms	Jeremy Tremp
2015	"From the Pale Mist"	Psalms	Nightmare Film Crew
2017	"Fvneral Moon"	Flesh Coffin	Joey Durango
2017	"Flesh Coffin"	Flesh Coffin	Joey Durango
2018	"This Is Hell"	Immortal	Joey Durango
2019	"Death Portrait"	Immortal	Joey Durango
2019	"Immortal"	Immortal	Brett Miller
2020	"King ov Deception"	Immortal	Joey Durango
2021	"To the Hellfire"	...And I Return to Nothingness	Eric DiCarlo
2021	"...And I Return to Nothingness"	...And I Return to Nothingness	Joey Durango
2022	"Sun//Eater"	Pain Remains	Loki Films
2022	"Into the Earth"	Pain Remains	Norbert Crowfield, Bad Moon Films
2022	"Cursed to Die"	Pain Remains	David Brodsky
2022	"Pain Remains I: Dancing Like Flames"	Pain Remains	David Brodsky
2022	"Pain Remains II: After All I've Done, I'll Disappear"	Pain Remains	David Brodsky
2022	"Pain Remains III: In a Sea of Fire"	Pain Remains	David Brodsky
2023	"Of the Abyss"	...And I Return to Nothingness	Loki Films
2023	"Welcome Back, O' Sleeping Dreamer"	Pain Remains	Eric Richter
2025	"Oblivion"	I Feel the Everblack Festering Within Me	Dylan Hryciuk
2025	"Unbreakable"	I Feel the Everblack Festering Within Me	Eric Richter
2025	"Prison of Flesh"	I Feel the Everblack Festering Within Me	David Brodsky
2025	"Glenwood"	I Feel the Everblack Festering Within Me	Dylan Hryciuk
2026	"In Darkness"	I Feel the Everblack Festering Within Me	David Brodsky
2026	"War Machine"	I Feel the Everblack Festering Within Me	Nicholas Chance
