= Amongst the Low & Empty =

Studio album by Signs of the Swarm
- Released: July 28, 2023
- Studio: Random Awesome!
- Genre: Deathcore
- Length: 42:10
- Label: Century Media
- Producer: Josh Schroeder; Cameron Losch; Joshua Travis

Signs of the Swarm chronology
Absolvere (2021)	Amongst the Low & Empty (2023)	To Rid Myself of Truth (2025)

Singles from Amongst the Low & Empty
- 1. "Tower of Torsos" Released: May 26, 2023; 2. "Borrowed Time" Released: June 9, 2024; 3. "Amongst the Low & Empty" Released: August 27, 2024

Professional ratings
Review scores
Source	Rating
Angry Metal Guy	1.5/5
Ghost Cult Magazine	6/10
Metal1.info	8/10
New Noise Magazine	4.5/5
New Transcendence	9.5/10

Amongst the Low & Empty is the fifth studio album by American deathcore band Signs of the Swarm. It was released on July 28, 2023, via Century Media Records in LP, CD and digital formats. The album was announced on May 26, 2023, together with the release of the single, "Tower of Torsos". It is their first album with new bassist Michael Cassese.

== Promotion ==
The band promoted the album with a North American tour in October and November 2023, with The Last Ten Seconds of Life, To the Grave, and Tactosa, in conjunction with supporting Carnifex on their tour in the same months. The band also supported Cattle Decapitation in their European tour with 200 Stab Wounds and Vomit Forth.

Continuing their touring for the album and celebrating ten years as a band, the band announced the Decade of the Swarm tour that took place in mid 2024 in North America with special guests Cane Hill, Ov Sulfur, 156/Silence and A Wake in Providence, and one that took place in late 2024 in Europe with Varials and To the Grave. A music video for "Borrowed Time" was released ahead of those tours.

== Track listing ==
All lyrics are written by David Simonich with additional input from Michael Cassese; all music is composed by Signs of the Swarm, with "Borrowed Time" and "Echelion" co-written by Cameron Losch.

Amongst the Low & Empty track listing
No.	Title	Length
1.	"Amongst the Low & Empty"	4:01
2.	"Tower of Torsos"	3:29
3.	"Pray for Death"	3:38
4.	"Borrowed Time"	3:00
5.	"Between Fire & Stone"	4:00
6.	"Shackles Like Talons"	4:34
7.	"Dreamkiller" (featuring Carl Schulz)	4:11
8.	"The Witch Beckons" (featuring Matt Heafy)	3:02
9.	"Echelon"	3:45
10.	"Faces Without Names"	4:27
11.	"Malady"	4:03
Total length:		42:10

== Personnel ==
=== Signs of the Swarm ===
- David Simonich – vocals
- Michael Cassese – bass
- Bobby Crow – drums, guitars

=== Additional contributors ===
- Josh Schroeder – production, mixing, mastering, engineering
- Carl Schulz – additional vocals and guitar on "Dreamkiller"
- Matt Heafy – additional vocals on "The Witch Beckons"
- Gabor Toth – artwork
- Cameron Losch – production on "Borrowed Time" and "Echelon"
- Joshua Travis – production on all tracks except "Echelon", "Faces Without Names", and "Malady"
- Caelan Stokkermans Arts – album layout
