= To Rid Myself of Truth =

Studio album by Signs of the Swarm
- Released: August 22, 2025
- Studio: Random Awesome!
- Genre: Deathcore
- Length: 39:56
- Label: Century Media
- Producer: Josh Schroeder; Signs of the Swarm

Signs of the Swarm chronology
Amongst the Low & Empty (2023)	To Rid Myself of Truth (2025)

Singles from To Rid Myself of Truth
- 1. "Hellmustfearme" Released: May 3, 2025

To Rid Myself of Truth is the sixth studio album by American deathcore band Signs of the Swarm. It was released on August 22, 2025, via Century Media Records in LP, CD and digital formats. Consisting of eleven tracks and preceded by Amongst the Low & Empty of 2023, the album was announced on May 2, 2025, together with the release of its lead single, "Hellmustfearme".

== Reception ==
Professional ratings
Review scores
Source	Rating
Blabbermouth	8.5/10
Distorted Sound	8/10
Kerrang!	3/5

Dan Slessor of Kerrang! remarked, "Whatever, this will undoubtedly trigger massive mosh pits the world over when unleashed on capacity crowds, and the band will continue to grow their fanbase," giving it a rating of three out of five.

Distorted Sound referred to the album as "an all out ride through the depths of hell and the high heavens", rating it eight out of ten and stating "It's quite rare to get a deathcore album that's both equal parts horrendously perverse and frighteningly beautiful".

Blabbermouth assigned it a rating of 8.5 out of ten and describing it as "an album of songs that wrench the genre's usual tropes in jolting, unsavory directions", in addition to commenting that it is "hellishly heavy but oddly refined, this is modern heavy music forced to a sanity-threatening breaking point, belched out with unstoppable bravado."

== Track listing ==
All lyrics are written by David Simonich with additional input from Michael Cassese, except "Fear & Judgment" with additional lyrics written by Jack Murray and Johnny Crowder; all music is composed by Signs of the Swarm.

To Rid Myself of Truth track listing
No.	Title	Length
1.	"To Rid Myself of Truth"	3:38
2.	"Hellmustfearme"	3:07
3.	"Natural Selection"	3:56
4.	"Scars Upon Scars"	3:00
5.	"Chariot"	3:31
6.	"Clouded Retinas" (featuring Will Ramos)	3:12
7.	"Iron Sacrament" (featuring Phil Bozeman)	3:24
8.	"Forcing to Forget"	3:36
9.	"Sarkazein"	4:26
10.	"Fear & Judgment" (featuring 156/Silence and Prison)	4:19
11.	"Creator"	3:47
Total length:		39:56

== Personnel ==
Credits adapted from the album's liner notes and Tidal.

=== Signs of the Swarm ===
- Michael Cassese – bass guitar, production
- Bobby Crow – drums, production
- David Simonich – lead vocals, production
- Carl Schulz – guitar, backing vocals, production

=== Additional contributors ===
- Josh Schroeder – production, mixing, mastering, engineering
- Will Ramos – lead vocals and engineering on "Clouded Retinas"
- Phil Bozeman – additional vocals on "Iron Sacrament"
- Zach Householder – engineering on "Iron Sacrament"
- Jack Murray – additional vocals on "Fear & Judgment"
- Johnny Crowder – additional vocals on "Fear & Judgment"
- David Kislik – engineering on "Fear & Judgment"
- Kyle O'Connell – engineering on "Fear & Judgment"
- Stripes Arts – artwork
- Dane Evans – album title font
- Alberto Villalobos – promotional photography
- Brendan Coughlin – album layout
