= Immortal (Lorna Shore album) =

Studio album by Lorna Shore
- Released: January 31, 2020
- Studios: Random Awesome! Studios, Bay City, Michigan
- Genres: Deathcore; blackened death metal; symphonic metal
- Length: 45:38
- Label: Century Media
- Producer: Josh Schroeder

Lorna Shore chronology
Flesh Coffin (2017)	Immortal (2020)	...And I Return to Nothingness (2021)

Singles from Immortal
- 1. "Darkest Spawn" Released: November 1, 2019; 2. "This Is Hell" Released: November 1, 2019; 3. "Death Portrait" Released: November 8, 2019; 4. "Immortal" Released: December 6, 2019; 5. "King ov Deception" Released: January 10, 2020

Immortal is the third studio album by the American deathcore band Lorna Shore. It was released on January 31, 2020 through Century Media Records and was produced by Josh Schroeder. The album is the band's first studio release with the label. It is also their first studio release to not feature longtime vocalist Tom Barber, who left the band to join Chelsea Grin. It is the band's only studio album to feature vocalist CJ McCreery (originally of Pennsylvania-based act Signs of the Swarm, now vocalist of Immortal Disfigurement), who joined the band in 2018 and was fired in December 2019, a month before the album's release date.

== Background and promotion ==
Longtime vocalist Tom Barber confirmed that he had left Lorna Shore in April 2018 to join Chelsea Grin as their vocalist, replacing Alex Koehler, who departed earlier in the year. Lorna Shore issued a statement, assuring their fanbase that they would continue without Barber. CJ McCreery of Pittsburgh-based deathcore band Signs of the Swarm was subsequently announced as his replacement after being rumored for some time. After McCreery joined Lorna Shore, the band released two singles, titled "This Is Hell" and "Darkest Spawn". The band joined the Summer Slaughter Tour supporting Cattle Decapitation, Carnifex, The Faceless, and several others. In early October, Lorna Shore announced their signing with Century Media Records along with the announcement of the album. The band supported Fit for an Autopsy and Rivers of Nihil that fall.

On December 23, 2019, the band abruptly fired McCreery after a Weinstein effect-style string of allegations involving alleged sexual abuse occurred in his name. The allegations began when an ex-lover of McCreery began posting stories and screenshots of text messages detailing abusive-like behavior that allegedly occurred within a 4-year relationship. Following this, some other parties also began to accuse McCreery of similar misconduct. A week and a half later, the band announced the cancellation of an upcoming tour in Asia and that the album (which was developed with McCreery on vocals) would be delayed. However, these claims were later retracted as it was revealed some time later that the album would be released on the originally planned date of January 31.

== Critical reception ==
Professional ratings
Review scores
Source	Rating
Blabbermouth.net	8.5/10
Distorted Sound	7/10
Metal Storm	8.0/10
New Transcendence	10/10

The album received generally positive reviews from critics. Dom Lawson from Blabbermouth.net gave the album 8.5 out of 10 and said: "With lashings of dense orchestration and a variety of twisted electronic textures providing extra layers of intrigue and charisma, Immortal is grandiloquent and ambitious in a way that deathcore generally hasn't been before. Not that Lorna Shore are the first band to skillfully weave other elements into the formula, of course, but they've made it sound a lot more exciting than anyone else in recent memory. Until they recruit a new singer and hit the road again, this monstrous record should put the band's name in the headlines, and for vastly more agreeable reasons this time." Sam Dignon of Distorted Sound scored the album 7 out of 10 and said: "So despite Lorna Shore finding themselves in a somewhat tricky situation prior to the release of Immortal, due to the alleged actions of their now ex-vocalist, it feels like going ahead with this album was the correct decision for the band. Deathcore fans will find a lot to love here and with a new vocalist surely on the way, the band will no doubt be able to make the most of this chapter in their career."

New Transcendence praised the album saying, "What Lorna Shore have made is more than the 'next step' in their impressive discography—that is to say, I don't know that anyone is ready for what awaits them on their first foray into the bleak, blistering and brutalizing journey that is Immortal. The better part of an hour, Lorna Shore's long-awaited and highly anticipated 2020 full length record is an immolating testament to everything a deathcore record should be. Eerie, heavy, gloomy and as gory as a Grindhouse double feature, Immortal is a relentless experience that has rightly earned its name, and thusly every ounce of hype it has accrued. Furthermore, Immortal will live on, as it seems bound to do for deathcore in this decade what acts like Oceano, Whitechapel and Glass Casket have done in decades prior."

== Track listing ==
All tracks are written by Lorna Shore.

Immortal track listing
No.	Title	Length
1.	"Immortal"	6:52
2.	"Death Portrait"	5:08
3.	"This Is Hell"	5:22
4.	"Hollow Sentence"	3:50
5.	"Warpath of Disease"	4:02
6.	"Misery System"	3:53
7.	"Obsession"	3:42
8.	"King ov Deception"	3:53
9.	"Darkest Spawn"	4:33
10.	"Relentless Torment"	4:23
Total length:		45:38

== Personnel ==
Credits adapted from album's liner notes.

Lorna Shore

- CJ McCreery – vocals
- Adam De Micco – guitars, bass
- Austin Archey – drums

Additional personnel

- Josh Schroeder – mixing, mastering, production
- Caelan Stokkermans – artwork, album layout
- Silas Ualthum – Immortal sigil design

== Charts ==
Chart performance for Immortal
Chart (2020)	Peak position
Australian Digital Albums (ARIA)	40
German Albums (Offizielle Top 100)	90
