= Living Chaos =

Studio album by Oceano
- Released: August 30, 2024
- Studio: The Nook, New Lenox, Illinois; The Foundation
- Genre: Deathcore; djent
- Length: 32:38
- Label: Sumerian
- Producer: Kai Christensen; Nick Nativo; Samuel Smith; Scott Smith; Adam Warren

Oceano chronology
Revelation (2017)	Living Chaos (2024)

Singles from Living Chaos
- 1. "Mass Produced" Released: August 16, 2022; 2. "Wounds Never Heal" Released: June 6, 2024; 3. "The Price of Pain" Released: July 11, 2024

Living Chaos is the sixth and final studio album by American deathcore band Oceano. The album was released on August 30, 2024, through Sumerian Records. It is the band's first album in seven years since Revelation.

== Background ==
After the band released Revelation in 2017, the band would go on hiatus before releasing a brand new single titled "Mass Produced" on August 16, 2022. On June 6, 2024, the band released another new single titled "Wounds Never Heal" along with the announcement of the album Living Chaos which was released on August 30, 2024, through Sumerian Records. It is the band's first studio album in seven years since 2017's Revelation. The band would also announce the Living Chaos Tour that took place from September to October 2024 with guests To the Grave, VCTMS and Half Me. The band also released another single off the album titled "The Price of Pain" on July 11, 2024. Vocalist Adam Warren explained that "'The Price of Pain' unravels a story of inner turmoil, suffering, and sacrifice."

== Track listing ==
All lyrics are written by Adam Warren; all music is composed by Scott Smith and Warren.

Living Chaos track listing
No.	Title	Producer(s)	Length
1.	"Wasted Life"	Scott Smith; Samuel Smith; Kai Christensen; Adam Warren	3:22
2.	"Mass Produced"	Scott Smith; Samuel Smith; Christensen; Warren	3:33
3.	"Darkness Rising"	Scott Smith; Samuel Smith; Christensen; Warren	4:07
4.	"Into the Flames"	Scott Smith; Samuel Smith; Nick Nativo; Warren	2:56
5.	"Wounds Never Healed"	Scott Smith; Samuel Smith; Christensen; Warren	4:22
6.	"Interlude"	Scott Smith	2:38
7.	"The Price of Pain"	Scott Smith; Samuel Smith; Christensen; Warren	3:40
8.	"Living Chaos"	Scott Smith; Samuel Smith; Christensen; Warren	2:47
9.	"Broken Curse"	Scott Smith; Samuel Smith; Nativo; Warren	5:13
Total length:			32:38

== Personnel ==
Oceano

- Adam Warren – vocals
- Scott Smith – guitars
- Chris Wagner – bass
- Matt Kohanowski – drums

Additional contributors

- Joey Sturgis – mixing, mastering
- Nick Matzkows – mixing, mastering
- Nick Nativo – engineering, vocal production
- Kai Christensen – vocal engineering, vocal production
- Adam Warren – vocal production
- Dusty Peterson – album artwork
- Eddie Kepner – layout
