= Della Robbia (typeface) =

Typeface

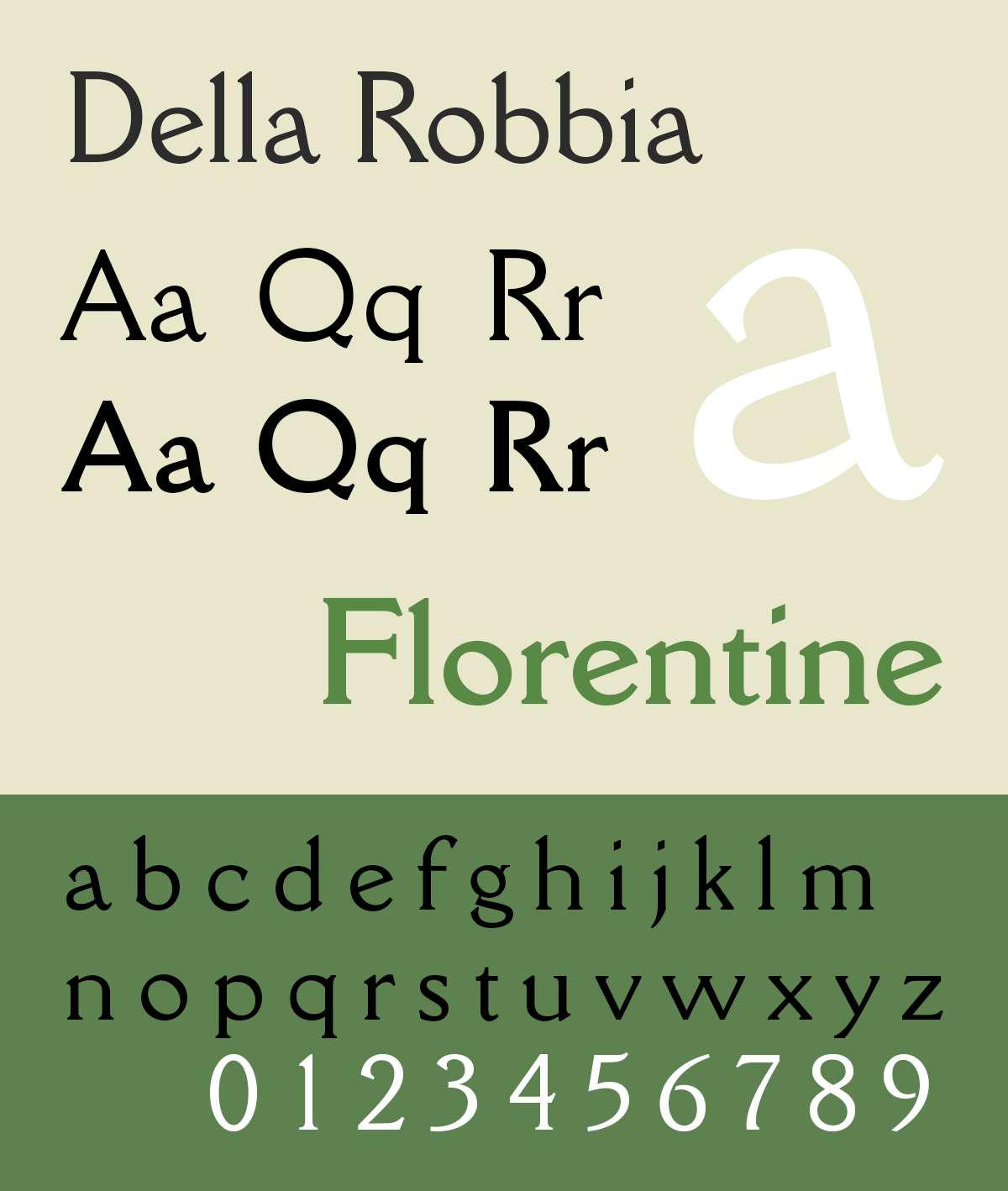
- Category: Serif
- Classification: Incised; Old style
- Designers: Thomas Maitland Cleland; Morris Fuller Benton
- Foundry: ATF; Linotype; Lanston Monotype; Bitstream Inc.
- Date created: 1902

Della Robbia is a typeface designed by Thomas Maitland Cleland (1880–1964) in 1902 for American Type Founders (ATF). It was designed to be a careful and scholarly creation of a typeface from 15th Century Florentine inscriptional capitals. It was named after Luca Della Robbia, a Florentine sculptor.

It was later cast by Lanston Monotype (1915), Deberny & Peignot (1917), and Intertype, cast as Westminster Old Style by Stephenson Blake (1907), and cast as Firenze by Typefoundry Amsterdam.

The font is used in the credits for digitally remastered versions of seasons 14 to 17 of the television series Doctor Who, replacing the original font used by the BBC, Cantoria. It was also used as the title art for Steven Spielberg's semi-autobiographical film The Fabelmans (2022).
