= Maleficium =

Maleficium may refer to:

- Maleficium (album), a 1996 album by Morgana Lefay
- Maleficium (EP), a 2013 EP by Lorna Shore
- The Maleficium, a 1992 role-playing supplement for Ars Magica

== See also ==
- Malefice, an English heavy metal band
- The Malefice, a 2013 album by Pentagram Chile
- Maléfices, a 1985 role-playing game
- Maleficio, a 1954 Mexican film
- El maleficio, a Mexican telenovela
  - El maleficio 2: Los enviados del infierno, a 1986 Mexican film
  - El maleficio (2023 TV series), a Mexican telenovela
