= Signs of the Swarm =

American deathcore band

- Also known as: SOTS
- Origin: Pittsburgh, Pennsylvania, U.S.
- Genre: Deathcore
- Years active: 2014–present
- Labels: Unique Leader; Century Media
- Spinoffs: Immortal Disfigurement
- Members: Bobby Crow; David Simonich; Michael Cassese; Carl Schulz
- Past members: Collin Barker; Rodney Fabiann; Greg Charley; CJ McCreery; Jimmy Pino; Cory Smarsh; Jacob Toy; Jeff Russo

Signs of the Swarm is an American deathcore band from Pittsburgh, Pennsylvania, formed in 2014. The band has released six studio albums, and consists of drummer Bobby Crow, vocalist David Simonich, guitarist Carl Schulz and bassist Michael Cassese.

== History ==
=== Formation, Senseless Order, and The Disfigurement of Existence (2014–2018) ===
Signs of the Swarm was founded in 2014 with the initial lineup of vocalist CJ McCreery, guitarists Rodney Fabiann and Jacob Toy, bassist Collin Barker, and drummer Greg Charley. Charley was later replaced by Bobby Crow. Fabiann's departure saw Cory Smarsh joining the band as the new rhythm guitarist in January 2015.

Their debut full-length album, entitled Senseless Order, was released on April 29, 2016. The album drew influence from brutal death metal and slam. Senseless Order was mostly self-recorded and therefore received mixed reviews, but allowed the band to find their footing. Later that same year, they signed with Unique Leader Records.

Following the album's release, Bobby departed the band. Lineup changes followed which saw Jimmy Pino replaced Crow as drummer. Crow's departure was short lived as Collin too would depart from the band, this would see Crow returning to the band on bass. With this lineup, Signs of the Swarm released their second album, The Disfigurement of Existence, on November 3, 2017, their first release on Unique Leader. It was received positively by fans and it introduced the influences of black metal and hardcore, which would shape their sound going forward. The album's release was preceded by the single “Final Phase”, featuring guest vocals by Dickie Allen of Infant Annihilator.

=== Departure of CJ McCreery and Vital Deprivation (2018–2020) ===
In 2018, vocalist CJ McCreery departed Signs of the Swarm to join New Jersey–based deathcore act Lorna Shore, after their vocalist, Tom Barber, departed to join Chelsea Grin. The band issued a statement addressing McCreery's departure, saying the decision was mutual and stating "we wish him the best of luck in his future endeavors." They were briefly supported by Improvidence vocalist David Simonich and ex-Beyond Deviation vocalist Matthew Krawchuk while on tour with bands such as Traitors, Aborted, and Lorna Shore. Simonich would be announced as their permanent vocalist later that year.

Signs of the Swarm's third album, entitled Vital Deprivation, was released on October 11, 2019, serving as Simonich's debut with them as well as drummer Jimmy Pino's last album with them. It continued the sound they had previously explored on The Disfigurement of Existence. Some reviews were mixed, stating that the vocals drowned out the music in the mix. Pino departed the band early the next year, causing another change which saw Jacob Toy switch to playing bass, and Bobby Crow return to his original position as drummer.

=== Absolvere and line-up changes (2020–2022) ===
During the course of the COVID-19 pandemic, Signs of the Swarm released two non-album singles. The first, “Pernicious”, was released on October 20, 2020. The second, titled “The Collection”, was released on February 5, 2021, and featured guest vocals from Matt Honeycutt and Nick Arthur, of Kublai Khan and Molotov Solution, respectively. It would also be the first to feature new guitarist Jeff Russo (who used to be Improvidence with David Simonich), who joined the band full-time in early 2021 after initially being contacted to tour with them in 2020. Russo would also be involved in writing and recording their upcoming fourth album, according to a statement published later in the year.

On June 29, 2021, they announced their fourth studio album, Absolvere, which released on September 24, 2021, and premiered its first single and music video, “Totem”. About a month later on July 27, they released a second single, “Hollow Prison”, featuring Alex Erian of Despised Icon as a guest vocalist.

In August 2021, the band parted ways with longtime member Cory Smarsh following abuse allegations against him that surfaced on Facebook. Fellow longtime member Jacob Toy left the band as well. Despite this, the band confirmed that Absolvere’s release and support tours would continue as planned. They released a final music video which was filmed previously in 2021, featuring one of the former members for the album’s closing track "Death Whistle." Michael Cassese would step in to handle bass duties for their forthcoming tours. He was later announced as a full-time member on June 6, 2022.

The band embarked on a release tour for Absolvere in September 2021 with opening acts Worm Shepherd and Ov Sulfur, and supported Born of Osiris that fall, alongside Shadow of Intent. In early 2022, they supported Fit For an Autopsy, alongside Ingested, Enterprise Earth, and Great American Ghost.

They played at the Chaos & Carnage 2022 tour, headlined by Suicide Silence and Carnifex, featuring further support from Lorna Shore, Upon A Burning Body, Angelmaker, and Distant.

=== Century Media, Amongst the Low & Empty and Decade of the Swarm (2022–2024) ===
On August 29, 2022, the band announced their signing with Century Media Records, ending their nearly 6-year long relationship with Unique Leader Records. In celebration, they also announced a new single and video titled "Unbridled", which was released through Century Media on September 7.

The band entered the studio in November that same year to begin work on their fifth studio album with producer Josh Schroeder (King 810, Lorna Shore), with a social media post on December 15 confirming the album's completion. The following April, the band welcomed new guitarist Carl Schulz, confirming the departure of Jeff Russo in the process. They debuted a new single the next day, titled "Amongst the Low & Empty."

On May 26, 2023, the band revealed a new single titled “Tower of Torsos” and announced their fifth studio album Amongst the Low & Empty, which was released on July 28.

In celebration for ten years as a band, the band announced the Decade of the Swarm tour that took place in mid 2024 in North America with special guests Cane Hill, Ov Sulfur, 156/Silence and A Wake in Providence, and one that took place in late 2024 in Europe with Varials and To the Grave.

While on tour, the band released a brand new single titled "IWONTLETYOUDIE" on September 17, 2024.

=== To Rid Myself of Truth (2025–present) ===
On May 1, 2025, the band announced its sixth studio album, To Rid Myself of Truth. The album features Will Ramos of Lorna Shore, Phil Bozeman of Whitechapel, Jack Murray of 156/Silence, and Johnny Crowder of Prison. It was released on August 22, 2025. In March 2026 they toured Australia supported by local band, Ironstone.

== Band members ==
Current

- Bobby Crow – drums (2014–2016, 2020–present); bass (2016–2020); guitars (2023)
- David Simonich – lead vocals (2018–present)
- Michael Cassese – bass (2022–present; touring 2021–2022)
- Carl Schulz – guitars, backing vocals (2023–present)

Touring

- Matthew Krawchuk – lead vocals (2018)

Former

- Jacob Toy – bass (2020–2021); guitars (2014–2020)
- CJ McCreery – lead vocals (2014–2018)
- Collin Barker – bass (2014–2016)
- Rodney Fabiann – guitars (2014–2015)
- Greg Charley – drums (2014)
- Cory Smarsh – guitars, backing vocals (2015–2021), vocals (2019–2021)
- Jimmy Pino – drums (2016–2020)
- Jeff Russo – guitars (2021–2023)

Timeline

== Discography ==
=== Albums ===
List of Albums
| Year | Album details |
|---|---|
| 2016 | Senseless Order: Released: April 29, 2016; Label: independent |
| 2017 | The Disfigurement of Existence: Released: November 3, 2017; Label: Unique Leader Records |
| 2019 | Vital Deprivation: Released: October 11, 2019; Label: Unique Leader Records |
| 2021 | Absolvere: Released: September 24, 2021; Label: Unique Leader Records |
| 2023 | Amongst the Low & Empty: Released: July 28, 2023; Label: Century Media Records |
| 2025 | To Rid Myself of Truth: Released: August 22, 2025; Label: Century Media Records |

Singles

- "Senseless Order" (2015)
- "Final Phase (feat. Dickie Allen)" (2017)
- "Malevolent Enslavement" (2019)
- "Tempting Death (feat. Tom Barber)" (2019)
- "Crown of Nails" (2019)
- "Pernicious" (2020)
- "The Collection (feat. Nick Arthur & Matt Honeycutt)" (2021)
- "Totem" (2021)
- "Hollow Prison (feat. Alex Erian)" (2021)
- "Death Whistle" (2021)
- "Dreaming Desecration (Federico Ascari Remix)" (2022)
- "Unbridled" (2022)
- "Amongst the Low & Empty" (2023)
- "Tower of Torsos" (2023)
- "Malady" (2023)
- "IWONTLETYOUDIE" (2024)
- "HELLMUSTFEARME" (2025)
- "Clouded Retinas (feat. Will Ramos)" (2025)
- "Theriac" (with Code: Pandorum) (2026)
