= Leo McClain =

Leo McClain may refer to:

- Leo McClain, a character in Neighbours introduced in 1998
- Leo McClain (born 2003), an American musician in Immortal Disfigurement
