= Dane Evans (disambiguation) =

Dane Evans may refer to:

- Dane Evans (born 1993), American football quarterback
- Dane Evans (musician), vocalist for Australian deathcore band To The Grave
