= Absolvere =

Studio album by Signs of the Swarm
- Released: September 24, 2021
- Genre: Deathcore
- Length: 40:14
- Label: Unique Leader
- Producers: Shane Mayer; Bobby Crow

Signs of the Swarm chronology
Vital Deprivation (2019)	Absolvere (2021)	Amongst the Low & Empty (2023)

Singles from Absolvere
- 1. "Totem" Released: June 30, 2021; 2. "Hollow Prison" Released: July 27, 2021; 3. "Death Whistle" Released: September 7, 2021; 4. "Hymns ov Invocation" Released: October 26, 2021

Professional ratings
Review scores
Source	Rating
Angry Metal Guy	3/5
Distorted Sound	8/10
Metal1.info	9/10
New Transcendence	9/10

Absolvere is the fourth studio album by American deathcore band Signs of the Swarm. It was released on September 24, 2021, via Century Media Records in LP, CD and digital formats. The album was announced on June 30, 2021, together with the release of the single, "Totem". It is their only album with guitarist Jeff Russo, and their last album with bassist Jacob Toy and guitarist Cory Smarsh who both left the band a month before the album's release. The album features guest appearances by Alex Erian (Despised Icon) in "Hollow Prison" and Ben Duerr (Shadow of Intent) in "Blood Seal", along with the band's first songs with clean vocals, "Dreaming Desecration" and "Death Whistle".

== Background and promotion ==
On June 29, 2021, they announced their fourth studio album, Absolvere, which released on September 24, 2021, and premiered its first single and music video, “Totem”. About a month later on July 27, they released a second single, “Hollow Prison”, featuring Alex Erian of Despised Icon as a guest vocalist.

In August 2021, the band parted ways with longtime member Cory Smarsh following abuse allegations against him that surfaced on Facebook, which were later proven to be false. Fellow longtime member Jacob Toy left the band as well. Despite this, the band confirmed that the release of Absolvere and support tours would continue as planned, such as supporting Born of Osiris on their North American Angel or Alien tour in October and November 2021, with Shadow of Intent. The band would also support Suicide Silence and Carnifex on their North American Chaos & Carnage tour in May and June 2022, with Lorna Shore, Upon a Burning Body, AngelMaker.

== Track listing ==
Absolvere track listing
No.	Title	Length
1.	"Hymns ov Invocation"	3:42
2.	"Boundless Manifestations"	3:55
3.	"Dreaming Desecration"	3:38
4.	"Totem"	4:00
5.	"Nameless"	4:00
6.	"Absolvere" (instrumental)	2:03
7.	"Revelations ov a Silent King"	3:11
8.	"Hollow Prison" (featuring Alex Erian)	4:13
9.	"Blood Seal" (featuring Ben Duerr)	5:39
10.	"Death Whistle"	5:53
Total length:		40:14

== Personnel ==
=== Signs of the Swarm ===
- David Simonich – vocals
- Jeff Russo – guitar
- Corey Smarsh – guitar
- Jacob Toy – bass
- Bobby Crow – drums, production, engineering

=== Additional contributors ===
- Alex Erian – additional vocals on "Hollow Prison"
- Ben Duerr – additional vocals on "Blood Seal"
- Shane Mayer – production, engineering
- Dom Grimard – assistant engineering
- Christian Donaldson – mixing, mastering
