= Incision =

Incision may refer to:

- Cutting, the separation of an object, into two or more portions, through the application of an acutely directed force
- A type of open wound caused by a sharp-edged object such as a knife, razor, or glass fragment
- Surgical incision, a cut made through the skin and soft tissue to facilitate an operation or procedure
- River incision, in geomorphology
- Incisions (album), by American deathcore band Oceano
- Incision (band), a Dutch hard rock band
- Incision (G.I. Joe), a fictional character
