= Revelation (Oceano album) =

Studio album by Oceano
- Released: May 19, 2017
- Recorded: 2016
- Studios: The Nook Recording Studio, New Lenox, IL
- Genre: Deathcore
- Length: 30:25
- Label: Sumerian
- Producer: Nick Nativo

Oceano chronology
Ascendants (2015)	Revelation (2017)	Living Chaos (2024)

Singles from Revelation
- 1. "The Great Tribulation" Released: April 5, 2017; 2. "Human Harvest" Released: April 21, 2017; 3. "Lucid Reality" Released: May 12, 2017

Revelation is the fifth studio album by American deathcore band Oceano, released on May 19, 2017, as their first album for Sumerian Records. It is also the band's first studio album as a four-piece band.

== Background ==
On the album's overall basic concept, vocalist Adam Warren stated: "All of the songs are the recollections of a separate being as he travels through a portal of alternate timelines[...]Each track is another revelation that he’s viewed. The Ascendants have been watching society grow and lightly influencing it but allowing humans free will for the most part. In turn, what they’ve seen is humanity basically deplete the planet to a near state of destruction".

== Track listing ==
No.	Title	Length
1.	"Dark Prophecy"	2:30
2.	"Lucid Reality"	2:56
3.	"Path to Extinction"	2:59
4.	"The Great Tribulation"	3:48
5.	"Illusions Unravel"	3:02
6.	"Majestic 12"	2:59
7.	"Final Form" (instrumental)	2:21
8.	"The Event"	2:46
9.	"Human Harvest"	2:52
10.	"Revelation"	4:12
Total length:		30:25

== Personnel ==
Band line-up

- Adam Warren – vocals
- Scott Smith – guitars
- Chris Wagner – bass
- Andrew Holzbaur – drums

Production

- Dusty Peterson – Artwork
- Daniel McBride – A&R, Layout
- Nick Walters – A&R
- Nick Nativo – Producer, Engineer
- Buster Odeholm – Mixing, Mastering
- Scott Smith – Engineer
