= Will Ramos =

American vocalist

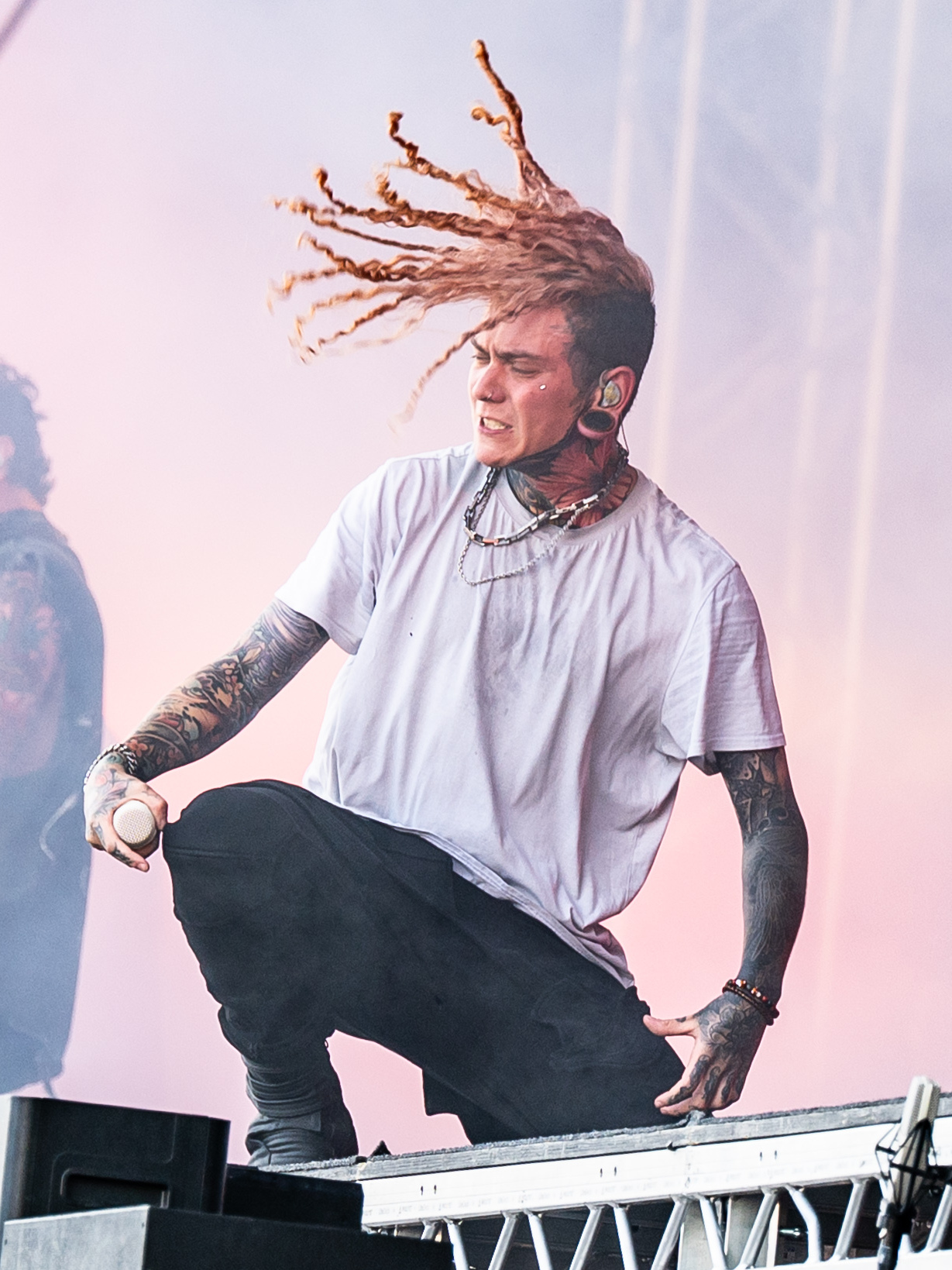
- Ramos performing with Lorna Shore in 2025

Background information
- Born: William Ramos; May 31, 1994 (age 32); New Jersey, U.S.
- Genres: Deathcore; symphonic metal; metalcore; death metal
- Occupations: Singer; songwriter
- Years active: 2014–present
- Member of: Lorna Shore
- Formerly of: A Wake in Providence; Monument of a Memory; Secrets Don't Sleep; Euclid; Flawed Saviour

William Ramos (born May 31, 1994) is an American singer and the lead vocalist for the deathcore band Lorna Shore.

== Early life ==
Ramos grew up in Edgewater, New Jersey, and nearby Leonia. He has continued to live there into adulthood. He attended Leonia High School, as part of the class of 2012. He is of Puerto Rican descent. He has three half sisters, all of whom are separated in age from him by fifteen years or more.

Ramos grew up playing music, and says he learned screaming and harsh vocals starting at around fourteen years old by imitating the heavy metal music he enjoyed. He credits his early interest in heavier music to friends who introduced him to bands including Bullet for My Valentine, Lamb of God, and Whitechapel. Ramos has cited as influences the bands Infant Annihilator and All Shall Perish, and credits his attempts to mimic the vocalists Dan Watson from Enterprise Earth and Mitch Lucker of Suicide Silence with helping him to learn to perform high vocals.

== Career ==
In around 2014 or 2015, Will Ramos began performing with his first band, the metalcore group Secrets Don't Sleep. He later joined the deathcore bands Flawed Saviour and A Wake in Providence, which went on tour with Lorna Shore prior to Ramos joining the band. He also worked in the film industry as a freelancer. When he joined Lorna Shore in 2020, Ramos was the vocalist for both the metalcore band Monument of a Memory and the death metal band Euclid.

=== Lorna Shore ===
Ramos first performed with Lorna Shore in March 2020 as a stand-in replacing CJ McCreery on the band's European tour with Decapitated, Beyond Creation, Ingested, and Viscera. The tour was ultimately cut short due to the COVID-19 pandemic. Shortly after Ramos joined the group on a touring basis in March, the band decided to record an EP with him. Lorna Shore guitarist Adam De Micco later explained that the band decided to do a three-song EP with Ramos "to see how the fit would be", which led to ...And I Return to Nothingness.

In June 2021, the band announced that Ramos would be joining as the group's permanent vocalist, and released the first single and music video from the EP, "To the Hellfire". "To the Hellfire" became a viral success for the band, peaking at number 4 on the Spotify Viral Chart's Top 10. It was later voted "2021 Song of the Year" by Loudwire, which described "Will Ramos' downright absurd vocal performance loaded with nightmarish high shrieks and one spotlight pig squeal that set the internet on fire".

Lorna Shore released Pain Remains on October 14, 2022. It is the band's fourth studio album, and the first to feature Ramos as vocalist. Ramos was the lyricist for both ...And I Return to Nothingness and Pain Remains.

=== Guest vocals ===
In November 2021, Ramos performed guest vocals for a revised version of Brand of Sacrifice's track "Lifeblood". In February 2023, Ramos performed guest vocals on "Heritage" by Dutch deathcore band Distant. In March 2023, Ramos was a guest vocalist on the song "Trag3dy" from nothing,nowhere.'s album Void Eternal. Ramos performed a song called "Leviathan", released in March 2023 as downloadable content for the 2022 rhythmic first-person shooter video game Metal: Hellsinger.

In April 2024, August Burns Red re-released a single titled "The Cleansing" from the band's prior year album, Death Below, featuring a new guest performance by Ramos to celebrate the album's one-year release anniversary. On January 22, 2025, Employed to Serve released the single "Atonement", which featured Ramos. The song marks the first time Ramos has recorded clean vocals for an album.

=== Other projects ===
Ramos has joined Elizabeth Zharoff for several videos on her YouTube channel, "The Charismatic Voice". In one, Ramos visits the National Center for Voice and Speech in Salt Lake City, where he performs harsh vocals while undergoing a laryngoscopy to provide insight into the anatomical movements that produce the various growling, screaming, and squealing sounds he uses in his music. A couple years later, he returned to Salt Lake City with Zharoff to be studied using laryngoscopy, electromyography of the muscles of his larynx, and dynamic MRI.

Ramos periodically posts one-take performances of Lorna Shore songs on YouTube, as well as vocal covers of songs by musicians including Sleep Token, Chelsea Grin, and Spiritbox. Ramos has also collaborated with musician and YouTuber Nik Nocturnal.

Ramos joined a group of other deathcore vocalists on a supergroup project originally titled The Big Six, and later renamed to Project: Vengeance. The group, consisting of Ramos, Left to Suffer's Taylor Barber, Infant Annihilator's Dickie Allen, Spite's Darius Tehrani, and Traitors' Tyler Shelton, released their debut single "Cut. Bleed. Repeat." in March 2023, and the follow-up "Vessel" in July 2023.

== Personal life ==
Ramos is an avid anime fan. In an interview with Crunchyroll, Ramos admitted that he got the idea for Pain Remains from an anime he had recently watched. He has named Naruto, Attack on Titan, Demon Slayer, Jujutsu Kaisen, and Chainsaw Man among his favorites, and also showed interest in the American animated series Avatar: The Last Airbender.

== Discography ==
Lorna Shore

- ...And I Return to Nothingness (EP, 2021)
- Pain Remains (2022)
- I Feel the Everblack Festering Within Me (2025)

Project: Vengeance

- "Cut. Bleed. Repeat." (single, March 2023)
- "Vessel" (single, July 2023)

Euclid

- Euclid (EP, 2020)
- Exsomnis (2021)

Viridian

- Waking (single, 2018)
- Translucid (EP, 2018)

A Wake in Providence

- "The Imperfect: Iconoclast" (single, 2016)
- "A Darkened Gospel" (single, 2017)
- Insidious: Phase II (2017)

Flawed Saviour

- The Abandoned (EP, 2016)

Guest appearances

- 2015: "Find Me Guilty" (with Secrets Don't Sleep)
- 2015: "Anomaly" (with Secrets Don't Sleep)
- 2015: "Still Standing" (with Secrets Don't Sleep)
- 2016: "Thanatophobic" (with Monument of a Memory)
- 2017: "The Void" (with Deathsinger)
- 2017: "History of a Drowning Boy" (with Cranely Gardens)
- 2018: "Comatose" (with Monument of a Memory)
- 2018: "The Extermination Process" (with Gravewalker)
- 2018: "Ocean of Illusions" (with Ocean of Illusions)
- 2018: "Repeat" (with The Fallen Prodigy)
- 2019: "Damned" (with Sold Soul)
- 2021: "Lifeblood" (with Brand of Sacrifice)
- 2021: "400" (with Beyond Deviation)
- 2022: "Victorious When the Devil Failed" (with Monument of a Memory)
- 2022: "Anabolic Spudsman" (Thique edition; with Bilmuri)
- 2022: "Torture Congregation" (with Semi-Rotted)
- 2023: "Heritage" (with Distant)
- 2023: "Leviathan" (with Metal: Hellsinger)
- 2023: "Trag3dy" (with nothing,nowhere.)
- 2024: "Riptide" (with The Gnarly Neighbor)
- 2024: "The Cleansing" (with August Burns Red)
- 2024: "Dark Signs" (with Nik Nocturnal) – Sleep Token cover
- 2024: "Top 10 Statues That Cried Blood" (with Nik Nocturnal) – Bring Me the Horizon cover
- 2025: "Dance!" (with Attack Attack!)
- 2025: "Atonement" (with Employed to Serve)
- 2025: "Clouded Retinas" (with Signs of the Swarm)
- 2026: "Subhuman" (with Periphery)
- 2026: "I Don't Trust Tomorrow" (with Bullet For My Valentine)
