= I Write to You, My Darling Decay =

Studio album by A Wake in Providence
- Released: July 26, 2024
- Genre: Deathcore, symphonic deathcore
- Length: 60:28
- Label: Unique Leader Records

A Wake in Providence chronology
Eternity (2022)	I Write to You, My Darling Decay (2024)

Singles from I Write to You, My Darling Decay
- 1. "Mournful Benediction" Released: May 21, 2024; 2. "Agonofinis" Released: June 25, 2024

Professional ratings
Review scores
Source	Rating
Boolin Tunes	8/10

I Write to You, My Darling Decay is the fourth album by American deathcore band A Wake in Providence, released on July 26, 2024. The album's announcement on May 21, 2024, came with a new single titled "Mournful Benediction" featuring Shadow of Intent vocalist Ben Duerr. The second single titled "Agonofinis" was released on June 25, 2024. It is the final album with vocalist Adam Mercer.

== Track listing ==
No.	Title	Length
1.	"The Maddening"	5:37
2.	"Mournful Benediction"	6:20
3.	"Agony, My Familiar"	2:16
4.	"Agonofinis"	4:52
5.	"And Through the Fog She Spoke"	7:12
6.	"In Whispers"	6:54
7.	"I Write to You, My Darling Decay"	7:51
8.	"The Unbound"	6:02
9.	"Pareidolia"	7:03
10.	"I, the Mournful"	6:21
Total length:		60:28

== Personnel ==
A Wake in Providence

- Adam Mercer – unclean vocals
- D'Andre Tyre – guitar, bass, orchestrations, clean vocals
- Jordan Felion – guitar
- Jessie McEnneny – drums

Guests

- Ben Duerr – unclean vocals on track 2
- Caroline Joy – operatic vocals
