= Depths (Oceano album) =

Studio album by Oceano
- Released: April 7, 2009
- Recorded: 2008
- Studio: The Foundation Recording Studio, Connersville, Indiana
- Genre: Deathcore
- Length: 44:20
- Label: Earache
- Producer: Joey Sturgis

Oceano chronology
Depths (2009)	Contagion (2010)

Professional ratings
Review scores
Source	Rating
Allmusic	4/5 stars
Rockfreaks.net	8/10

Depths is the debut studio album by American deathcore band Oceano, released April 7, 2009 through Earache Records. Music videos were made for the songs "District of Misery" and "A Mandatory Sacrifice". The song "District of Misery" is featured as downloadable content in Rock Band 2 via the Rock Band Network. This album is also the band's only album to feature guitarists Jeremy Carroll and Andrew Mikhail.

In celebration for the 15th anniversary of this album, the band toured in early 2024 with The Last Ten Seconds of Life, A Wake in Providence, By the Thousands, Within the Ruins and I Declare War.

In 2021, Joe Smith-Engelhardt of Alternative Press included the album in his list of "30 deathcore albums from the 2000s that define the genre".

== Track listing ==
All lyrics are written by Adam Warren; all music is composed by Oceano.

No.	Title	Length
1.	"Descent"	0:58
2.	"Inhuman Affliction"	3:17
3.	"A Mandatory Sacrifice"	4:05
4.	"Samael the Destroyer"	3:53
5.	"Fractured Frames, Scattered Flesh"	2:36
6.	"Disgust for Your Kind"	3:13
7.	"Depths"	6:24
8.	"District of Misery"	3:13
9.	"With Legions"	4:04
10.	"Slaughtered Like Swine"	3:09
11.	"Empathy for Leviathan"	2:57
12.	"Plague Campaign"	4:07
13.	"Abysm"	2:24
Total length:		44:20

Bonus tracks
No.	Title	Length
14.	"Involuntary Demoralization"	3:03
15.	"Orificial Execution"	3:22
Total length:		50:45

== Personnel ==
Oceano

- Adam Warren – vocals
- Jeremy Carroll – guitars
- Andrew Mikhail – guitars
- Jason Jones – bass
- Daniel Terchin – drums

Production

- Joey Sturgis – producer, keyboards, programming, mastering, mixing, engineer
- Colin Marks – artwork (album art & design)
- Brendan Bradley – artwork (logo design)
- Roger Hensley – artwork (additional logo design)
- Jay Baumgardner – band photography
