= Contagion (Oceano album) =

Studio album by Oceano
- Released: November 9, 2010
- Recorded: July–October 2010, @ Planet-Z Studios, Hadley, Massachusetts / 357 Productions, Longueuil, Quebec
- Genre: Deathcore
- Length: 38:06
- Label: Earache
- Producer: Chris "Zeuss" Harris

Oceano chronology
Depths (2009)	Contagion (2010)	Incisions (2013)

Singles from Contagion
- 1. "Weaponized" Released: November 4, 2010

Professional ratings
Review scores
Source	Rating
Allmusic	4/5 stars
Rockfreaks.net	5/10

Contagion is the second studio album by American deathcore band Oceano, released November 9, 2010 through Earache Records. A video for "Weaponized" was released on November 4.

== Track listing ==
No.	Title	Length
1.	"Precursor to Enslavement"	3:49
2.	"Viral Re-Animation" (feat. Alex Erian and Steve Marois of Despised Icon)	3:19
3.	"Regulated Disposal of Life"	3:00
4.	"Quarantine"	3:23
5.	"The Contaminated"	4:12
6.	"Exist in Confinement" (Instrumental)	4:14
7.	"Persuasive Oppression" (feat. Nick Arthur of Molotov Solution)	3:50
8.	"Weaponized"	2:44
9.	"Sadistic Experiments"	3:34
10.	"Remnants Aflame"	2:55
11.	"Ending Intellect"	3:01
Total length:		38:06

== Personnel ==
- Adam Warren – vocals
- Devin Shidaker – lead guitars
- Nick Conser – rhythm guitars
- Jason Jones – bass
- Daniel Terchin – drums
- Alex Erian – guest vocals
- Steve Marois – guest vocals
- Nick Arthur – guest vocals

== Production ==
- Produced, engineered & mixed by Chris «Zeuss» Harris
- Vocal engineering by Antoine Lussier
- Pre-production by Chuck Macak
- Cover art & illustrations by Dusty Peterson
- Layout by Summer Lacy
- Photo by Jimmy Kurek
