= Eternity (A Wake in Providence album) =

Studio album by A Wake in Providence
- Released: October 21, 2022
- Genres: Deathcore, symphonic black metal
- Length: 42:58
- Label: Unique Leader Records

A Wake in Providence chronology
The Blvck Sun//The Blood Moon (2019)	Eternity (2022)	I Write to You, My Darling Decay (2024)

Singles from Eternity
- 1. "The Horror ov the Old Gods" Released: August 11, 2022; 2. "We Are Eternity" Released: September 23, 2022

Professional ratings
Review scores
Source	Rating
Distorted Sound	9/10

Eternity is the third album by American deathcore band A Wake in Providence, released on October 21, 2022. It is the band's first album to be released through Unique Leader Records. The album's announcement on August 11, 2022 came with a new single titled "The Horror ov the Old Gods". The second single, "We Are Eternity" was released on September 23, 2022.

== Track listing ==
No.	Title	Length
1.	"An Odyssey Through the River (Overture)"	2:18
2.	"The Horror ov the Old Gods"	4:27
3.	"We Are Eternity"	5:16
4.	"Siamo legati dal terrore"	6:09
5.	"The Hunt ov the Wraith (First Movement)"	5:19
6.	"The Book ov the Eldritch (Second Movement)"	5:34
7.	"The Court ov the Trinity (Final Movement)"	7:14
8.	"Weep into the Abyss, for It Hears You Not..."	1:20
9.	"Vicious Attenuation"	5:21
Total length:		42:58

== Personnel ==
A Wake in Providence

- Adam Mercer – unclean vocals
- D'Andre Tyre – guitar, bass, orchestrations, clean vocals
- Jordan Felion – guitar
- Jessie McEnneny – drums
