= Lorna Shore =

American deathcore band

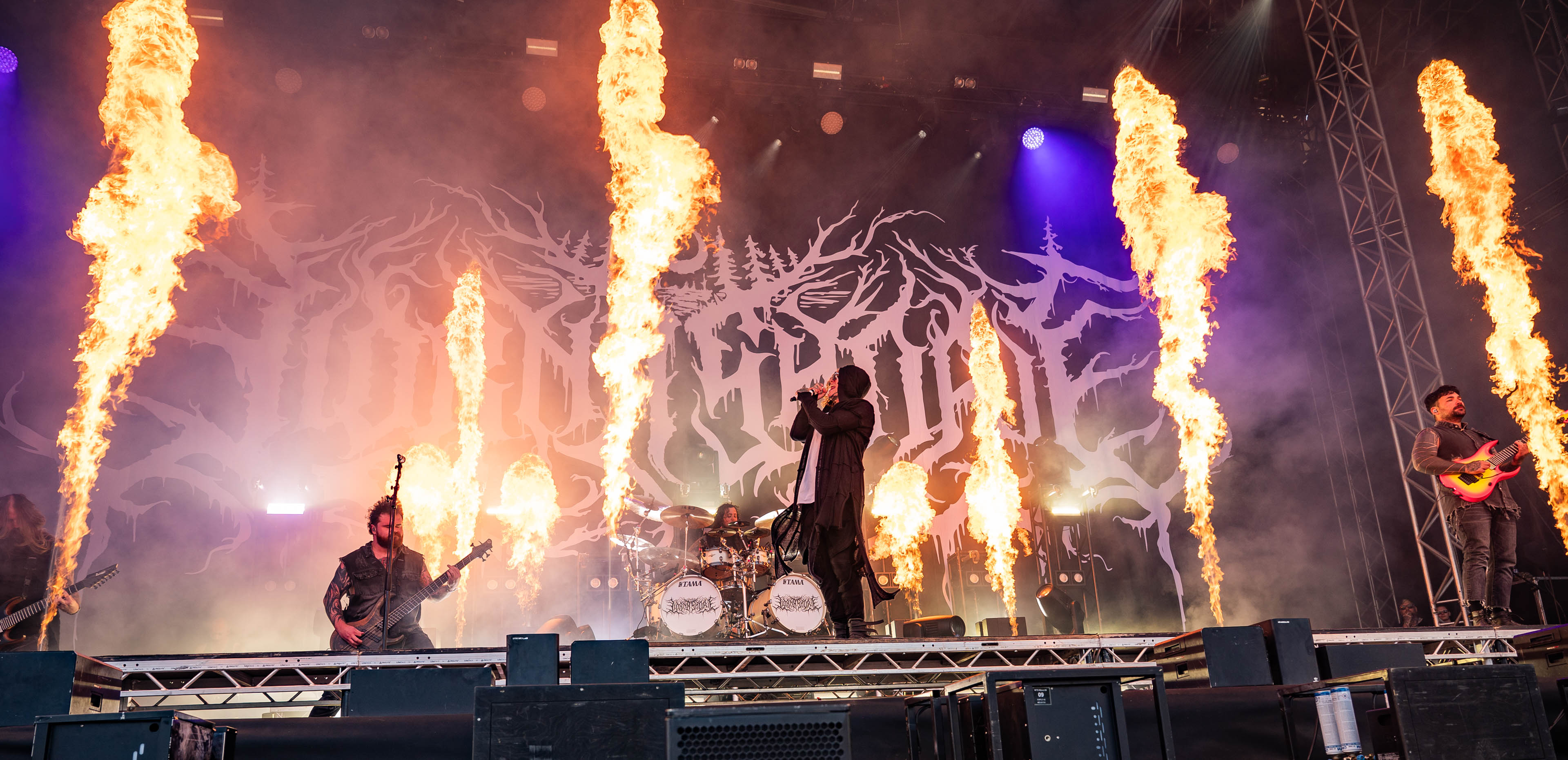
- Lorna Shore performing at Tons of Rock 2025

Background information
- Origin: New Jersey, U.S.
- Genres: Deathcore; blackened death metal; symphonic metal; metalcore (early)
- Works: Lorna Shore discography
- Years active: 2009–present
- Labels: Density; Outerloop; Century Media
- Spinoffs: Immortal Disfigurement
- Members: Adam De Micco; Austin Archey; Andrew O'Connor; Will Ramos; Michael Yager
- Past members: Mike Flannery; John Hawkins; Ray Meoni; Aaron Brown; Jeff Moskovciak; Scott Cooper; Gary Herrera; Tom Barber; Connor Deffley; CJ McCreery
- Website: lornashorestore.com

Lorna Shore is an American deathcore band formed in New Jersey in 2009. The group consists of lead guitarist Adam De Micco, drummer Austin Archey, rhythm guitarist Andrew O'Connor, vocalist Will Ramos, and bassist Michael Yager. The band is known for their 2021 single, "To the Hellfire". They have released five studio albums, Psalms (2015), Flesh Coffin (2017), Immortal (2020), Pain Remains (2022), and I Feel the Everblack Festering Within Me (2025). The band has released four EPs. Since 2012, no original members remain in the band. The longest-running member is Adam De Micco, who joined in 2010.

== History ==
=== Early years, line-up changes, and Psalms (2009–2015) ===
Lorna Shore was formed in 2009 in New Jersey, named after a character from Batman Confidential. The band released the EP Triumph in October 2010, featuring a metalcore sound. The band's second EP, Bone Kingdom, released in February 2012, was the first to have a deathcore sound with a progressive style. Maleficium, the band's third EP, was released in December 2013. The music video for the single "Godmaker" was a hit on YouTube after being released by BeheadingTheTraitor. Maleficium had a black metal influence, unlike the first two EPs. Maleficium was re-released in March 2014 by Density Records.

Following Maleficium, Lorna Shore opened for Carnifex's Die Without Hope Tour featuring I Declare War, Betraying the Martyrs and Here Comes the Kraken. Before releasing their debut album, they toured with The Black Dahlia Murder, Within the Ruins, Archspire, Oceano, Ice Nine Kills, Fallujah, Fit for an Autopsy, Rivers of Nihil, Cattle Decapitation, Upon a Burning Body, The Last Ten Seconds of Life, and Chelsea Grin. Psalms, their debut album, was released on June 9, 2015, through Density Records. Fit for an Autopsy guitarist Will Putney produced the album.

=== Flesh Coffin and Herrera's departure (2016–2017) ===
On September 21, 2016, Lorna Shore signed with Outerloop Records. The band released Flesh Coffin on February 17, 2017. The album was produced at Atrium Audio by Carson Slovak and Grant McFarland, known for working with August Burns Red and From Ashes to New, among others. They released the single "Denounce the Light" on November 17, 2016. The second single, "Fvneral Moon", was released on January 13, 2017. In early 2017, bassist Gary Herrera left the band due to losing interest in music.

=== Departure of Barber and Deffley, McCreery's allegations, and Immortal (2018–2020) ===
Singer Tom Barber left Lorna Shore in April 2018 to join Chelsea Grin, replacing vocalist Alex Koehler, who departed earlier in the year. Lorna Shore assured fans that they would continue without Barber. CJ McCreery of Pittsburgh-based deathcore band Signs of the Swarm was announced as his replacement. After McCreery joined, the band released the singles "This Is Hell" and "Darkest Spawn". The band joined the Summer Slaughter Tour, supporting Cattle Decapitation, Carnifex, The Faceless, and several others. In January 2019, guitarist Connor Deffley left the band, leaving Lorna Shore as a three-piece. In early October, Lorna Shore signed with Century Media Records and announced Immortal. The band supported Fit for an Autopsy and Rivers of Nihil from October to November. On December 9, 2019, the band recruited guitarist Andrew O'Connor.

On December 23, 2019, the band fired McCreery after allegations of sexual abuse. The allegations began when a former romantic partner of McCreery posted stories and screenshots of text messages detailing abusive behavior that allegedly occurred within a four-year relationship. Following this, other parties accused McCreery of similar misconduct. A week and a half later, the band cancelled an upcoming tour in Asia, and stated they would delay their upcoming Immortal album (with McCreery on vocals). The latter was retracted, and the album would be released on the originally planned date of January 31.

=== ...And I Return to Nothingness and Pain Remains (2021–2024) ===
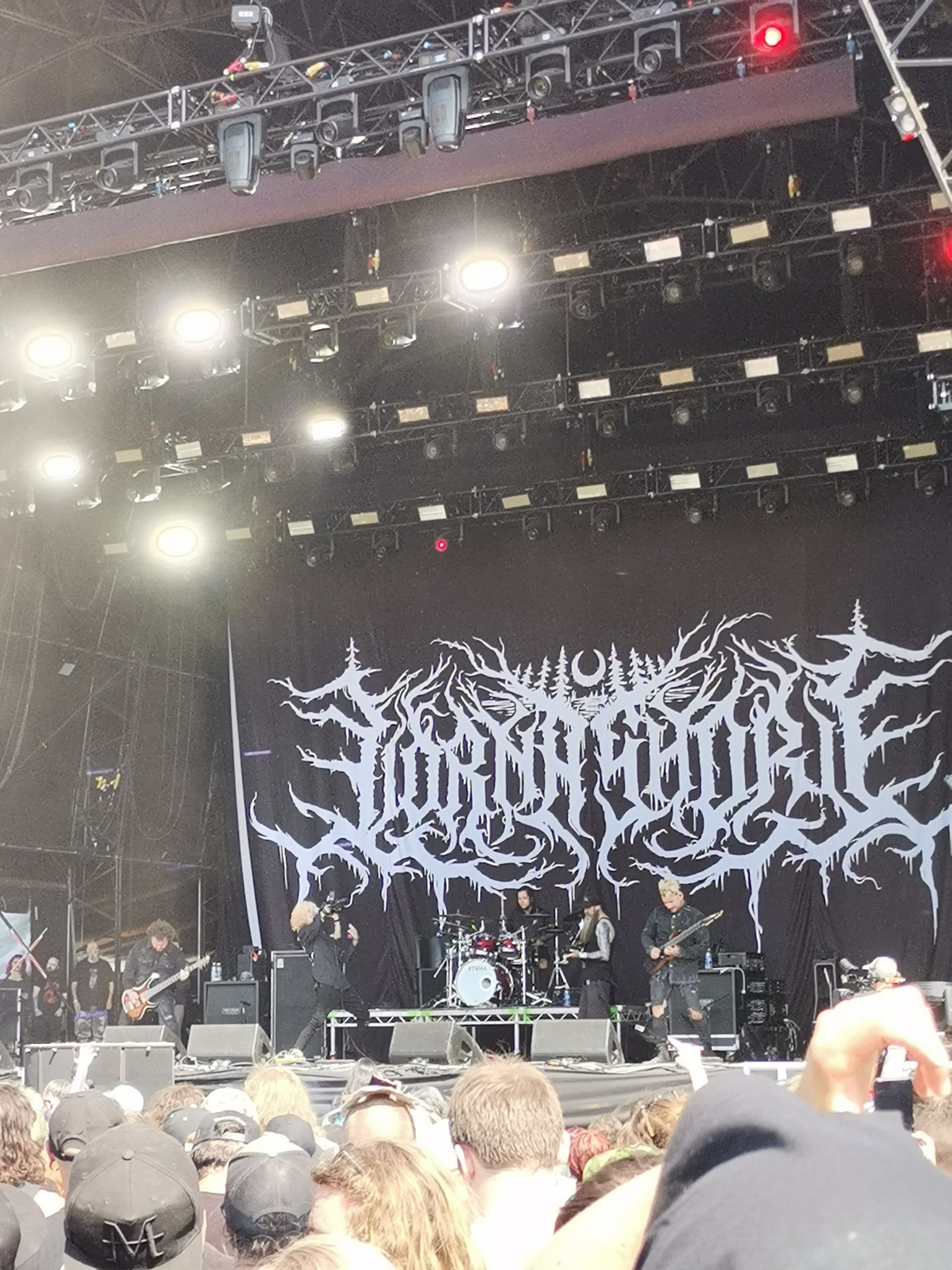
Lorna Shore at Bloodstock Open Air 2022

Lorna Shore toured Europe to support Immortal with vocalist Will Ramos, formerly of Monument of a Memory and A Wake in Providence, as a stand-in. The COVID-19 pandemic cut further activity short. On March 5, 2021, while on tour, the band released an instrumental edition of Immortal.

On June 11, 2021, the band released "To the Hellfire" and announced Ramos as their new permanent vocalist. Ramos was originally a fill-in touring member. They announced details of their new EP ...And I Return to Nothingness.

"To the Hellfire" was a viral success, peaking at number 4 on the Spotify Viral Chart's Top 10. Readers of Revolver voted it the "Best Song of 2021 So Far," with writer Eli Enis calling it "one of the most over-the-top heavy deathcore songs in recent memory. It overtook "Immortal" as the band's most-streamed song on Spotify at over four million streams. Loudwire elected it the best metal song of 2021.

The EP was released on August 13, 2021, with positive reviews for the title track. Ricky Aarons of Wall of Sound stated, "The band continue with the epic vehicle of destruction, but change tact slightly, in a way that's reminiscent of their previous work... The technical detail and speed to the riffs are incredible. Once again Ramos doesn't skip a detail in every lyric he sounds... He considers which lines end in a high or low and these minute details are make-or-break. Instead of the song focusing on breakdown ferocity it's more about stead-fast blast beats and the technical element of this wonderful band."

On April 29, 2022, the band live-debuted the song "Sun//Eater", from the album Pain Remains. The song, along with a music video, was officially released on May 13. As well as the album announcement, the new single was the first with bassist Michael Yager, who joined during the recording of Pain Remains. On June 22, Lorna Shore debuted a second single from the album, "Into the Earth", with an accompanying music video. On July 26, the band released the third single from the album, "Cursed to Die", and revealed Pain Remains would be released on October 14. On September 14, the band released the first part of the album's title track, "Pain Remains I: Dancing Like Flames". On September 29, the band released the second part, "Pain Remains II: After All I've Done, I'll Disappear", along with a music video. The music video for "Pain Remains III: In a Sea of Fire" was released October 14, 2022, coinciding with the album release. Lorna Shore toured Europe in late 2022. Drummer Austin Archey sat out due to a back injury; bassist Michael Yager took over drums. On September 28, 2023, the band released a music video for the song "Welcome Back, O' Sleeping Dreamer". On November 3, 2023, the band released an instrumental version of Pain Remains.

=== I Feel the Everblack Festering Within Me (2025–present) ===
On May 16, 2025, Lorna Shore released the single "Oblivion" from their upcoming fifth studio album, I Feel the Everblack Festering Within Me, released on September 12, 2025. On June 25, 2025, second single "Unbreakable" was released. On August 14, 2025, third single "Prison of Flesh" was released. On the same day of the album's release, Lorna Shore released a music video for the song "Glenwood".

Lorna Shore held tour concerts with the Japanese deathcore band Deviloof in Japan and Taiwan in October 2026.

== Musical style ==
Lorna Shore's musical style has been mainly described as deathcore, blackened death metal, blackened deathcore, symphonic metal, and symphonic deathcore. The band's music contains influences from black metal and utilizes symphonic elements. The band's early work showed one-time experiments in other metal genres outside their primary sound; their debut EP Triumph has been described as metalcore, their second EP Bone Kingdom moved into a progressive deathcore sound, their third EP Maleficium was the first to show influences from black metal, and their debut album Psalms is referred to as more of a technical death metal album with the breakdowns expected in deathcore.

== Band members ==
Current

- Adam De Micco – lead guitar (2010–present); rhythm guitar (2011–2015, 2019); bass (2017–2021)
- Austin Archey – drums (2012–present)
- Andrew O'Connor – rhythm guitar, synthesizers (2019–present); bass (2019–2021)
- Will Ramos – lead vocals (2021–present; touring member 2020–2021)
- Michael Yager – bass, backing vocals (2021–present); drums (touring member 2022)

Former

- Mike Flannery – bass (2009)
- John Hawkins – lead vocals (2009–2010)
- Ray Meoni – lead vocals (2010)
- Aaron Brown – lead guitar (2009–2010)
- Jeff Moskovciak – rhythm guitar (2009–2011)
- Scott Cooper – drums (2009–2012)
- Gary Herrera – bass (2009–2017)
- Tom Barber – lead vocals (2010–2018)
- Connor Deffley – rhythm guitar (2014–2019); bass (2017–2019)
- CJ McCreery – lead vocals (2018–2019)

Timeline

== Discography ==
Studio albums

- Psalms (2015)
- Flesh Coffin (2017)
- Immortal (2020)
- Pain Remains (2022)
- I Feel the Everblack Festering Within Me (2025)
