= Ascendants (album) =

Studio album by Oceano
- Released: March 23, 2015
- Recorded: 2014, @ The Nook Recording Studio, New Lenox, Illinois
- Genre: Deathcore
- Length: 28:03
- Label: Earache

Oceano chronology
Incisions (2013)	Ascendants (2015)	Revelation (2017)

Singles from Ascendants
- 1. "Dawn of Descent" Released: January 12, 2015

Ascendants is the fourth studio album by American deathcore band Oceano. It was released on March 23, 2015, via Earache Records.

== Background ==
Adam Warren of Oceano commented "This album is an evolution of our brand of heaviness. It is our most focused release ever and contains a concept that elevates the band onto a higher plane."

== Critical reception ==
Professional ratings
Review scores
Source	Rating
AllMusic	0/5 stars
Ultimate Guitar	4.3/10 stars

AllMusic gave the album a 0/5 rating with the review stating "the sound of Ascendants is pure pummeling deathcore, more closely aligned with the monstrous attack displayed on their 2009 debut, Depths." Ultimate Guitar suggested the album as unoriginal, stating "there's very little that makes Ascendants feel like new music."

The album was described as dark, grim, brooding, hopeless deathcore with an impressive demonstrated range of vocals. Connor Welsh of New Transcendence wrote "it showcases a band not just at the peak of their performance, but towering with immensity and an iron rule over the remainder of [the] heavy music scene." Metalsucks had described the album as "having the same sound, the same rhythm, the same everything."

== Track listing ==
No.	Title	Length
1.	"Nephilim"	1:32
2.	"Transient Gateways"	3:10
3.	"The World Engine"	3:12
4.	"Dead Planet"	3:24
5.	"The Taken"	3:08
6.	"Dawn of Descent"	4:28
7.	"The Dulce Incident"	2:50
8.	"Arc of Creation"	3:05
9.	"External Existence"	3:14
Total length:		28:03

== Personnel ==
Band line-up

- Adam Warren – vocals, lyrics
- Michael Kasper – lead guitar
- Scott Smith – rhythm guitar
- Chris Wagner – bass
- Chason Westmoreland – drums

Production

- Dusty Peterson – Cover art
- Mark Leary – Layout
- Nick Nativo – Producer, engineer
- Oceano – Producer
- Will Putney – Mixing, Mastering
- Michael Kasper – Engineer
- Scott Smith – Engineer

== Charts ==
Chart	Position (2015)
US Top Hard Rock Albums (Billboard)	14
US Independent Albums (Billboard)	41
