= Ironstone (band) =

Australian progressive deathcore band

- Origin: Bendigo, Victoria, Australia
- Genres: Deathcore; progressive metalcore (early); djent (early)
- Years active: 2016–present
- Members: Edward Warren; Perry Warren; Samuel Angove; Jackson Whyte; Remy Giuliani
- Past members: see #Members
- Website: https://ironstoneband.com/

Ironstone (styled in all caps) are an Australian progressive deathcore band, which formed in Bendigo in 2016. As from 2026 they comprise founding lead vocalist and main songwriter Edward Warren, and his brother Perry Warren on guitar, who have been joined by Samuel Angove on bass guitar, Remy Giuliani on guitar and Jackson Whyte on drums. The band have independently released three extended plays (EPs), Prophecy (2020), The Place I Cannot Find (2022) and A Shadow of My Former Self (2025).

== History ==
=== 2016–2020: Early years ===
Ironstone were formed in Bendigo, Victoria, in 2016 by Edward Warren on lead guitar and vocals and his brother Perry Warren on bass guitar. Initially knowns as Detention, they played cover versions of material by Van Halen, Audioslave, AC/DC and Metallica before introducing original tracks. The band relocated to Melbourne by 2018 and released material independently, with their debut singles, "Machine" and "Polarity" in early 2019. Their next single, "Bound", appeared in late 2019, Its music video was created and edited by Anne Warren (Edward and Perry's mother) who was also their first manager. Anne also co-wrote songs with Edward Warren.

Ironstone had used various lead vocalists, Kody Austin and Stacy Varner from 2016 and Victoria K. in 2018 to 2019. Edward was also lead vocalist for a short time before Dan Charlton joined in 2019. In 2020 the group followed with additional singles "Downpour" and "Hollow". These singles appeared on their debut six-track extended play, Prophecy, which was released in May 2020. During that year the band underwent further line-up changes, including Perry Warren being replaced by Oliver Hosking on bass guitar.

=== 2021–2022: The Place I Cannot Find ===
In October 2022 Ironstone released their second EP, The Place I Cannot Find. It also has six tracks, including three singles co-written by Anne and Edward Warren with Charlton, which had been issued in 2021, "Mr. Struggle", "Shiny Things" and "Brave the Black". Aidan Kalms departed the band prior to the EP's release while Charlton left shortly after.

=== 2023–present: New singles to third EP ===
In June 2023 Ironstone changed their line-up: Edward Warren transitioned from guitar to lead vocals, Whyte remained on drums, Perry Warren returned on lead guitar and Sam Angove joined on bass guitar. They issued three singles with this line-up, "Deadly Laser", "Red Hound" and "Death So Grim". In 2024, guitarist Remy Giuliani joined, completing the five-piece line-up.

On 5 November 2025, Ironstone announced their signing with management company Welkin Entertainment, before they released their third EP, A Shadow of My Former Self, on 7 November 2025. They followed with a single, "Handsome Fee" in 2026. Also in that year, Ironstone supported visiting American deathcore groups, Born of Osiris and Signs of the Swarm on their joint Australian tour.

== Members ==
=== Current members ===
- Edward Warren – lead guitar (2016–2023), lead vocals (2019, 2023–present)
- Perry Warren – bass guitar (2016–2020), lead guitar (2023–present)
- Jackson Whyte – drums (2016–present)
- Sam Angove – bass guitar (2023–present)
- Remy Giuliani – guitar (2024-present)

=== Former members ===
- Kody Austin – lead vocals (fl. 2016)
- Harrison Jenner – rhythm guitar, keyboards, backing vocals (fl. 2016)
- Andy Muller – drums, backing vocals (fl. 2016)
- Matthew Taylor – rhythm guitar, backing vocals (fl. 2016)
- Stacy Varner – lead vocals (fl. 2017)
- Victoria K – lead vocals (2018–2019)
- Aidan Kalms – rhythm guitar, keyboards (2018–2022)
- Dan Charlton – lead vocals (2019–2022)
- Oliver Hosking – bass guitar (2020–2022)

== Discography ==
=== Extended plays ===
List of extended plays
Title	Details
Prophecy	Released: 29 May 2020; Label: Independent (self-release); Formats: CD, digital download, streaming
The Place I Cannot Find	Released: 29 October 2022; Label: Independent (self-release); Formats: CD, digital download, streaming
A Shadow of My Former Self	Released: 7 November 2025; Label: Independent (self-release); Formats: CD, digital download, streaming

=== Singles ===
Year	Title	Album
2019	"Machine"	non-album single
2019	"Polarity"	non-album single
2019	"Bound"	Prophecy
2020	"Downpour"	Prophecy
2020	"Hollow"	Prophecy
2021	"Mr. Struggle"	The Place I Cannot Find
2021	"Shiny Things"	The Place I Cannot Find
2021	"Brave the Black"	The Place I Cannot Find
2023	"Deadly Laser"	non-album single
2023	"Red Hound"	non-album single
2024	"Death so Grim"	A Shadow of My Former Self
2025	"The Innocent Bleed"	A Shadow of My Former Self
2025	"Forge Me Anew"	A Shadow of My Former Self
2025	"Moments Lost In Time"	A Shadow of My Former Self
2026	"Handsome Fee"	non-album single
2026	"Commence the Culling"	non-album single
2026	"Cerebral Nexus Necrosystem"	non-album single
