= I Feel the Everblack Festering Within Me =

Studio album by Lorna Shore
- Released: September 12, 2025
- Genre: Deathcore; symphonic deathcore; extreme metal
- Length: 66:27
- Label: Century Media
- Producer: Josh Schroeder; Adam De Micco

Lorna Shore chronology
Pain Remains (2022)	I Feel the Everblack Festering Within Me (2025)

Singles from I Feel the Everblack Festering Within Me
- 1. "Oblivion" Released: May 16, 2025; 2. "Unbreakable" Released: June 25, 2025; 3. "Prison of Flesh" Released: August 14, 2025

Professional ratings
Review scores
Source	Rating
AllMusic	4/5 stars
Blabbermouth.net	9/10
Boolin Tunes	6/10
Distorted Sound	10/10
Kerrang!	4/5
Louder Sound	4/5 stars
Wall of Sound	10/10

I Feel the Everblack Festering Within Me is the fifth studio album by the American deathcore band Lorna Shore. It was released on September 12, 2025, through Century Media Records and was produced by Josh Schroeder.

== Background and promotion ==
The first hint at the album's title, I Feel the Everblack Festering Within Me, came from a billboard near Newark Liberty International Airport that includes the title and a website address mirroring it, as reported on May 8, 2025.

On May 16, 2025, Lorna Shore released the album's first single, "Oblivion", confirmed the album's title, and announced that it would be released on September 12, 2025. On June 25, 2025, the second single, "Unbreakable", was released. On August 14, 2025, the third single, "Prison of Flesh", was released. On the same day as the album's release, Lorna Shore released a new music video for the song, "Glenwood".

In conjunction with the album, the band embarked on a North American tour in September and October 2025, with support by The Black Dahlia Murder, Shadow of Intent, and PeelingFlesh. The band then embarked on a European tour in January and February 2026, with support by Whitechapel, Shadow of Intent, and Humanity's Last Breath.

== Composition ==
The album's title comes from a lyric in the third single and opening track, "Prison of Flesh". Vocalist Will Ramos explained that he wrote the song "about my family's history with dementia. The idea that eventually this void will consume me or my family and the fear of trying to run away from something that'll inevitably just consume everything that you have or know."

The lyrics for "Oblivion" were written against "the continued destruction of our planet and its resources, with little regard for longterm sustainability of the ecosystem or ourselves as a species." Ramos stated, "I imagined a post-apocalyptic world in the (hopefully distant) future. A world where we have sown the seeds of our own destruction. The idea that we wished for better, hoped we were doing something that would help save us in this dying world, only to end up accelerating its inevitable destruction. This brings up the question: What is right? Do we even know what we’re doing? What have we done to try and actually change anything? Are we watering the earth or just feeding a constantly growing fire?"

Contrary to the first two songs' dark lyrical themes, "Unbreakable" has a brighter, more motivational lyrical message, with "the idea that the world could always try to take us down and put us into the dirt, whatever you want to call it. But throughout all of this, throughout all the pressure, we get hardened, and we become the best version of ourselves – whether it's individually or as a group. That’s what the song tries to embellish: that feeling that we're all here together, and we're stronger together. Perseverance, perseverance, perseverance, keep malevolent". "Glenwood" was described by Rock Sound as "a powerful look at Ramos' estrangement from his father, a song that he hopes will resonate with others in similar circumstances."

== Track listing ==
All lyrics are written by Will Ramos; all music is composed by Lorna Shore.

I Feel the Everblack Festering Within Me track listing
No.	Title	Length
1.	"Prison of Flesh"	7:00
2.	"Oblivion"	8:19
3.	"In Darkness"	6:43
4.	"Unbreakable"	4:49
5.	"Glenwood"	6:43
6.	"Lionheart"	5:44
7.	"Death Can Take Me"	7:16
8.	"War Machine"	4:52
9.	"A Nameless Hymn"	5:14
10.	"Forevermore"	9:47
Total length:		66:27

Japanese edition bonus track
No.	Title	Length
11.	"Oblivion" (Instrumental Version)	8:20
Total length:		74:47

== Personnel ==
Lorna Shore

- Will Ramos – lead vocals
- Adam De Micco – lead guitar
- Andrew O'Connor – rhythm guitar, synths, orchestrations
- Michael Yager – bass, backing vocals
- Austin Archey – drums

Additional personnel

- Adam De Micco – production
- Josh Schroeder – production, mastering, mixing, engineering
- Zac Shiffer – cover art

== Charts ==
Chart performance for I Feel the Everblack Festering Within Me
Chart (2025)	Peak position
Australian Albums (ARIA)	14
Austrian Albums (Ö3 Austria)	4
Belgian Albums (Ultratop Flanders)	30
Belgian Albums (Ultratop Wallonia)	29
Dutch Albums (Album Top 100)	22
French Albums (SNEP)	73
French Rock & Metal Albums (SNEP)	4
Finnish Albums (Suomen virallinen lista)	2
German Albums (Offizielle Top 100)	4
German Rock & Metal Albums (Offizielle Top 100)	1
Japanese Digital Albums (Oricon)	45
Japanese Rock Albums (Oricon)	14
Japanese Top Albums Sales (Billboard Japan)	69
Japanese Western Albums (Oricon)	20
Norwegian Albums (IFPI Norge)	85
Swedish Albums (Sverigetopplistan)	18
Swedish Hard Rock Albums (Sverigetopplistan)	1
Scottish Albums (OCC)	15
Swiss Albums (Schweizer Hitparade)	12
UK Albums Sales (OCC)	13
UK Rock & Metal Albums (OCC)	1
US Billboard 200	129
US Independent Albums (Billboard)	18
US Top Rock & Alternative Albums (Billboard)	30
