= Flesh Coffin =

Studio album by Lorna Shore
- Released: February 17, 2017
- Genre: Deathcore; blackened deathcore
- Length: 45:34
- Label: Outerloop
- Producer: Lorna Shore; Carson Slovak; Grant McFarland

Lorna Shore chronology
Psalms (2015)	Flesh Coffin (2017)	Immortal (2020)

Singles from Flesh Coffin
- 1. "Denounce the Light" Released: November 17, 2016; 2. "Fvneral Moon" Released: January 13, 2017

Flesh Coffin is the second studio album by the American deathcore band Lorna Shore. It was released on February 17, 2017 through Outerloop Records, their only album with the label. The album was self-produced by the band along with Carson Slovak and Grant McFarland. It is the last album to feature bassist Gary Herrera, vocalist Tom Barber and rhythm guitarist Connor Deffley.

== Critical reception ==
Professional ratings
Review scores
Source	Rating
Exclaim!	6/10
New Noise	4.5/5 stars
New Transcendence	10/10

The album received mostly positive reviews from critics. Joe Smith-Engelhardt of Exclaim! gave it 6 out of 10 and said: "As a whole, Flesh Coffin has a very dynamic sound, but it's sullied slightly by a surplus of filler. The moments when the band show their vast range of talent are constantly being overshadowed by the never-ending blur of aggression that leaves the listener wondering where each song begins and ends." New Noise gave the album a positive review and stated: "There's no doubt that Lorna Shore's sophomore record will go down as one of the best deathcore albums in recent memory. Their form of the style imagines Carnifex's blackened deathcore, except much more technical and melodic. It's impressive how catchy such a dark record can be, and given how disappointing aspects of their past work were, Lorna Shore has to be praised for their ability to regroup and improve. Here's hoping we get something even better in a couple years, even if Flesh Coffin is quite excellent."

New Transcendence praised the album saying, "Few and far between are the deathcore albums that are as beautifully nostalgic as they are contemporary and comprehensive—but Flesh Coffin is surely one of them. With speed and scathing fretwork enough to give old-school deathcore addicts a taste of truly death-metal-infused heavy musicianship, yet murderously heavy, stuttering and skin-peeling breakdowns blistering enough to make downtempo bands feel like top-40 pop, Lorna Shore have proven themselves masters of metallic integration into modern, malicious deathcore. Barber's vocals are at the top of their game, with the rest of Lorna Shore's instrumental writing being second-to-none to boot. Flesh Coffin is pounds upon pounds of feisty, furious power—an album sure to entomb any set of ears that subject themselves to it."

== Track listing ==
No.	Title	Length
1.	"Offering of Fire"	5:48
2.	"Denounce the Light"	4:39
3.	"The Astral Wake of Time"	3:55
4.	"Desolate Veil"	4:51
5.	"Fvneral Moon"	5:00
6.	"Void"	4:15
7.	"Infernum"	3:57
8.	"The//Watcher"	4:03
9.	"Black Hollow"	4:12
10.	"Flesh Coffin"	4:54
Total length:		45:34

== Personnel ==
Credits adapted from AllMusic.

Lorna Shore

- Tom Barber – vocals
- Adam De Micco – lead guitar
- Connor Deffley – rhythm guitar
- Gary Herrera – bass
- Austin Archey – drums

Additional personnel

- Carson Slovak and Grant McFarland – production, mixing
- Lorna Shore – production
- Zakk Cervini – mastering
- Enlighten Creative Studio – logo
- Lance Rowe – layout

== Charts ==
Chart (2017)	Peak position
US Heatseekers Albums (Billboard)	3
