= Pain Remains =

Studio album by Lorna Shore
- Released: October 14, 2022
- Studio: Random Awesome! Studios (Bay City)
- Genre: Deathcore; symphonic metal; blackened death metal
- Length: 61:06
- Label: Century Media
- Producer: Josh Schroeder

Lorna Shore chronology
...And I Return to Nothingness (2021)	Pain Remains (2022)	I Feel the Everblack Festering Within Me (2025)

Singles from Pain Remains
- 1. "Sun//Eater" Released: May 13, 2022; 2. "Into the Earth" Released: June 22, 2022; 3. "Cursed to Die" Released: July 27, 2022; 4. "Pain Remains I: Dancing Like Flames" Released: September 14, 2022; 5. "Pain Remains II: After All I've Done, I'll Disappear" Released: September 29, 2022

Pain Remains is the fourth studio album by the American deathcore band Lorna Shore. It was released on October 14, 2022, through Century Media Records and was produced by Josh Schroeder. In addition to being the first album (and second overall release) to feature vocalist Will Ramos and rhythm guitarist Andrew O'Connor, the album is their first release featuring new bassist Michael Yager.

== Background and promotion ==
On April 29, 2022, the band debuted a new song, "Sun//Eater", during a concert from the album. The song, along with a music video, was officially released on May 13. As well as the album announcement, the new single was the first to feature new bassist Michael Yager, who joined the band during the recording sessions for the album. On June 22, Lorna Shore debuted their second single, titled "Into the Earth", from their upcoming album along with an accompanying music video.

On July 26, the band released the third single from the album, "Cursed to Die", and also revealed the album would be released on October 14. On September 14, the band released the first part of the album's title track titled "Pain Remains I: Dancing Like Flames". On September 29, the band released the second part of the album's title track titled "Pain Remains II: After All I've Done, I'll Disappear" along with a music video. The music video for "Pain Remains III: In a Sea of Fire" was released October 14, 2022, coinciding with the album release. An instrumental version of the album was released on November 3, 2023.

On March 14, 2024, Lorna Shore released a full band playthrough of the 'Pain Remains' trilogy on YouTube.

== Critical reception ==
Professional ratings
Review scores
Source	Rating
Blabbermouth.net	9/10
Distorted Sound	9/10
Kerrang!	4/5 stars
Louder Sound	4/5 stars
Metal Injection	9/10
Metal Storm	7.9/10
MetalSucks	4.5/5 stars
New Transcendence	10/10
Rock 'N' Load	10/10
Wall of Sound	8/10

The album received acclaim from critics. Dom Lawson from Blabbermouth.net gave the album 9 out of 10 and said: "Frankly, Pain Remains is fucking ridiculous — far beyond deathcore. The entire game just changed, and Lorna Shore have already won it." James Weaver of Distorted Sound scored the album 9 out of 10 and said: "With Pain Remains, Lorna Shore have straddled the online hype and delivered a record that not only exceeds the surge of reaction videos, but cements the band as the flagbearers for modern deathcore. Expansive, technical and utterly monstrous, Pain Remains is the face of deathcore in 2022 and showcases a band more than ready to lead the frontline." Kerrang! gave the album 4 out of 5 and stated: "Three years ago, Lorna Shore didn't even know if they had a future, but with Pain Remains they have sealed their fate as one of the bands to take actual heavy music forward. Hear them roar." Louder Sound gave the album a positive review and stated: "Lorna Shore have been audacious and daring in the composing of Pain Remains, and it's paid off handsomely." Metal Injection rated the album 9 out of 10 and stated, "Pain Remains is even better than we had hoped. Anyone who thought the last EP was a fluke or a passing trend has been proved wrong. Lorna Shore joins the likes of Spiritbox and I Prevail at the very top of modern metal. Lorna Shore are several degrees heavier than those two bands though, an unstoppable juggernaut driven by confidence and raw talent. Nobody can accuse them of selling out. It's been a long, hard road and all the work has paid off. Lorna Shore have delivered the best album of their career and one of the best symphonic metal and deathcore albums in recent memory."

Max Heilman of MetalSucks rated the album 4.5 out of 5 and said: "Lorna Shore clearly have a vision on Pain Remains. They want to write large-scale, festival-ready metal while pushing the boundaries of deathcore. Sure, they're not the first core band to incorporate black metal—or to drag the concept of a 'breakdown' to almost ludicrous depths—but Pain Remains stands out. It deserves whatever recognition it gets, because it's an insanely well-written, fun listen. Lorna Shore aren't just 'that blackened deathcore band from TikTok.' They've effectively proven their staying power in the larger pantheon of kick-assery." New Transcendence praised the album saying, "Pain Remains is a lot of things, but despite dense instrumental complexity, intense vocal dynamism, brilliant lyricism and marvelous production it also manages to be a remarkably fun record—and undoubtedly 2022's finest foray into the world of deathcore. While Lorna Shore have encountered more than their fair share of pain, they use all of it on Pain Remains, and have crafted something truly immaculate." Rock 'N' Load praised the album saying, "Pain Remains is the best release of 2022 so far and it's going to take some beating." Wall of Sound gave the album a score 8/10 and saying: "Pain Remains extends over an hour to deliver the symphonic masterpiece you expected, with more drama than a Shakespearean poem. Packed with not-so-kosher/halal pig-squeals, this record will have you pulling a stank face that might just leave a mark. My only gripes on the album include a slight overuse of symphonies (despite its impressive variation) and some of the track lengths, which may be a bit hyperbole. Other than that, it delivers above expectations and will be an album you remember for a very long time."

== Track listing ==
All tracks are written by Lorna Shore.

Pain Remains track listing
No.	Title	Length
1.	"Welcome Back, O' Sleeping Dreamer"	7:21
2.	"Into the Earth"	5:12
3.	"Sun//Eater"	6:10
4.	"Cursed to Die"	4:40
5.	"Soulless Existence"	7:12
6.	"Apotheosis"	4:54
7.	"Wrath"	4:57
8.	"Pain Remains I: Dancing Like Flames"	5:52
9.	"Pain Remains II: After All I've Done, I'll Disappear"	5:36
10.	"Pain Remains III: In a Sea of Fire"	9:12
Total length:		61:06

The Japanese edition includes the entire ...And I Return to Nothingness EP as bonus tracks.

== Personnel ==
Lorna Shore

- Will Ramos – vocals
- Adam De Micco – lead guitar
- Andrew O'Connor – rhythm guitar, orchestrations
- Michael Yager – bass
- Austin Archey – drums

Additional personnel

- Josh Schroeder – production, mastering, mixing, engineering

== Charts ==
2022 chart performance for Pain Remains
Chart (2022)	Peak position
Australian Albums (ARIA)	77
Austrian Albums (Ö3 Austria)	6
Belgian Albums (Ultratop Flanders)	70
Dutch Albums (Album Top 100)	53
Finnish Albums (Suomen virallinen lista)	7
German Albums (Offizielle Top 100)	6
Scottish Albums (Official Charts)	63
Swiss Albums (Schweizer Hitparade)	7
UK Album Downloads (Official Charts)	11
UK Rock & Metal Albums (Official Charts)	5
US Billboard 200	150

2025 chart performance for Pain Remains
Chart (2025)	Peak position
French Rock & Metal Albums (SNEP)	89
