= Incisions (album) =

Studio album by Oceano
- Released: October 1, 2013
- Recorded: 2013, @ Electrowerks Music Production, Downers Grove, IL
- Genre: Deathcore
- Length: 46:47
- Label: Earache; Century Media (UK)
- Producer: Chuck Macak

Oceano chronology
Contagion (2010)	Incisions (2013)	Ascendants (2015)

Singles from Incisions
- 1. "Slow Murder" Released: January 28, 2013; 2. "Incisions" Released: August 12, 2013

Professional ratings
Review scores
Source	Rating
Ultimate Guitar (staff review)	5.2/10

Incisions is the third studio album by American deathcore band Oceano. The album was released on October 1, 2013 on Earache Records. On January 28, "Slow Murder" was released as a lyric video, and on August 12 the band unveiled another song from the album, "Incisions", and also announced the album's release date.

== Track listing ==
No.	Title	Length
1.	"Eternal Wasteland"	3:01
2.	"Slow Murder"	4:30
3.	"Slave of Corporotocracy"	3:16
4.	"Internal War"	4:48
5.	"Self Exploited Whore"	3:00
6.	"New Age Apophis"	3:31
7.	"Embrace Nothingness"	4:40
8.	"Incisions"	3:59
9.	"Blasphemous Mask"	3:19
10.	"Severed Appendages" (ft. Tim Goergen of Within the Ruins)	3:57
11.	"Disseverance" (Instrumental)	5:16
12.	"The Reclaimation"	3:33
Total length:		46:47

== Personnel ==
Band line-up

- Adam Warren – vocals, lyrics
- Devin Shidaker – lead guitar
- Nick Conser – rhythm guitar
- Jason Jones – bass
- Daniel Terchin – drums

Production

- Ken Sarafin – Artwork
- Chuck Macak – Producer, engineer, Mixing, Mastering
- Kevin Doti – Engineer
- Adam Hassel – Engineer
- Andrew Conner – Assistant Engineer
- Adam Hansen – Drums
- Recorded @ Electrowerks Music Production in Downers Grove, IL
