= Oceano (band) =

American deathcore band

- Origin: Cook County, Illinois, U.S.
- Genre: Deathcore
- Years active: 2006–2025
- Labels: Sumerian; Earache
- Past members: Adam Warren; Scott Smith; Chris Wagner; Jeremy Carroll; Christopher Negron; Jeff Erickson; Derek Hildreth; Nico LaCorcia; Andrew Mikhail; Tristan McCann; Eddie "Doom" Harris; Michael Kasper; Kevin Hare; Mike Southcomb; Devin Shidaker; Daniel Terchin; Nick Conser; Jason Jones; Chason Westmoreland; Andrew Holzbaur; Marquis Green; Mike Shanahan; Matt Kohanowski
- Website: Oceano on Facebook

Oceano was an American deathcore band from Cook County, Illinois. Formed in 2006, the band signed to Earache Records and released their debut album, Depths, on April 7, 2009. They released three more albums under Earache Records before Revelation was released on May 19, 2017 with Sumerian Records. Their sixth and final studio album, Living Chaos, was released on August 30, 2024.

Following the departure of lead guitarist Jeremy Carroll in 2009, the band no longer had any original members. Vocalist Adam Warren was the longest-tenured member of the band, from 2007 until 2025.

== History ==
Formed in 2006, Oceano was originally a four-piece consisting of founder Jeremy Carroll on guitar, bassist Jeff Erickson, drummer Derek Hildreth, and singer Eddie Harris. Oceano went through a revolving door of members until settling on a new lineup and sound in 2007. That lineup, consisting of singer Adam Warren, rhythm guitarist Andrew Mikhail, drummer Michael Southcomb, and bassist Kevin Hare, developed the sound of their first recordings.

In 2008, Oceano was banned from various clubs across the US due to their violent and controversial promo pictures.

Oceano recorded their full debut album, Depths, in late 2008, releasing it on April 7, 2009 through Earache records.

Jeremy Carroll was fired from the band in January 2009 due to personality conflicts. Carroll's departure left no members from the original lineup in the band. On February 3, 2010, Andrew Mikhail departed the band.

Oceano was a part of the 2011 Summer Slaughter Tour in North America alongside co-headliners Whitechapel and The Black Dahlia Murder.

In January 2012, Earache dispelled rumors of the band's breakup. Instead, they announced that the band was going on a short hiatus after their performance at the New England Metal and Hardcore Festival due to vocalist Adam Warren becoming a father. After some time away from the band, Oceano continued touring. Prior to performing on the US summer Scream It Like You Mean it tour, they revealed that they had begun writing their next album, Incisions, due in 2013. The first lyric video from the album, "Slow Murder", was released on January 28, 2013. On January 12, 2015, the band released the song "Dead Planet" from their fourth album, Ascendants, released on March 23, 2015. On February 17, 2017, the band announced via Facebook that they had signed to Sumerian Records. They released their fifth album, Revelation, on May 19. The band played Texas Independence Fest in 2018.

On August 17, 2022, Oceano released the single "Mass Produced", their first new song since 2017. The band headlined Toledo Death Fest in 2009.

On February 19, 2024, the band announced a 15th anniversary tour for Depths with support from Within the Ruins, I Declare War, By The Thousands, The Last Ten Seconds of Life and A Wake In Providence. On June 6, Oceano released the single "Wounds Never Healed", and announced this single and "Mass Produced" were on the sixth studio album, Living Chaos, was released on August 30, 2024. Another tour was announced, which took place in late 2024 for the new album with support from To the Grave, Half Me and Vctms. Another single from the album, "The Price of Pain", was released on July 11, 2024.

In November 2024, it was announced Oceano would embark on the America's Rejects Tour with Attila and Dealer. Following the announcement, the band was criticized for being a part of the tour due to past allegations of abuse and sexual misconduct against Attila and Dealer vocalists Chris Fronzak and Aidan Ellaz Holmes, respectively. Warren responded to the controversy claiming he was unaware of the allegations and distanced himself from other individuals' conduct, though still implied he would remain on the tour and noted he wants concerts "to always be a safe place". Shortly after, Warren announced Oceano would be dropping off the tour and that he quit the band to focus on his solo project, Adam on Earth, claiming he was made a "scapegoat" by the controversy and that he was "surrounded by complicit industry people, a metal 'scene' riddled with cosplay, worship of band members and less focus on artistic integrity.". Warren also announced that Oceano would be performing their final shows in 2025.

On February 19, 2025, the band announced that their farewell tour would take place in May, featuring I Declare War, See You Next Tuesday, Filth, and Backbiter. Shortly following the announcement, the band was accused of stealing the artwork being used to promote the tour. As a result of the accusations, See You Next Tuesday dropped off the tour and was replaced by Escuela Grind. On May 13, the band announced a second leg of their farewell tour to take place in August, which would feature support from Rose Funeral, Filth, LarcɆnia RoɆ, and Inferious. A third leg of the tour for September and October was announced on July 25, featuring the same support bands from the second leg of the tour. On August 6, the band announced an Australian leg of the tour for late October where they would play a special set featuring songs from Depths and Contagion, performing with former members who played on the two albums. The band's final show took place on December 6 at the West Chicago Social Club in Chicago.

== Members ==
Final lineup

- Adam Warren – vocals (2007–2025)
- Scott Smith – guitars (2014–2025)
- Chris Wagner – bass (2014–2025)

Touring members

- Alex Nourse – drums (2024–2025)
- Evan Gillen – bass (2024–2025)
- Louie C. Granados – guitar (2025)
- Sterling M. Stetar – bass (2025)
- Adrian Galindo – drums (2025)

Former members

- Jeremy Carroll – lead guitar (2006–2009)
- Andrew Mikhail – rhythm guitar (2007–2010)
- Marquis Green – vocals (2006)
- Christopher Negron – vocals (2006)
- Eddie "Doom" Harris – vocals (2006–2007)
- Jeff Erickson – bass (2006–2007)
- Kevin Hare – bass (2007–2008)
- Derek Hildreth – drums (2006–2007)
- Nico LaCorcia – drums (2007)
- Mike Southcomb – drums (2007–2008)
- Jason Jones – bass (2008–2014)
- Daniel Terchin – drums (2008–2013)
- Tristan McCann – lead guitar (2009)
- Devin Shidaker – lead guitar (2010–2013)
- Nick Conser – rhythm guitar (2010–2014)
- Michael Kasper – lead guitar (2013–2016)
- Chason Westmoreland – drums (2014–2015)
- Mike Shanahan – third guitar (2014–2015)
- Andrew Holzbaur – drums (2015–2017)
- Matt Kohanowski – drums (2017–2022)

Timeline

== Discography ==
List of studio albums, with selected chart positions
Title	Album details	Peak chart positions			
Title	Album details	US Heat.	US Indie.	US Rock	US Hard Rock
Depths	Released: April 7, 2009; Label: Earache; Formats: CD, digital download	16	—	—	—
Contagion	Released: November 9, 2010; Label: Earache; Formats: CD, digital download	3	25	50	17
Incisions	Released: October 1, 2013; Label: Earache; Formats: CD, digital download	12	—	—	21
Ascendants	Released: March 23, 2015; Label: Earache; Formats: CD, digital download	—	—	—	14
Revelation	Released: May 19, 2017; Label: Sumerian; Formats: CD, digital download	—	—	—	—
Living Chaos	Released: August 30, 2024; Label: Sumerian; Formats: CD, vinyl, digital download	—	—	—	—
"—" denotes a recording that did not chart or was not released in that territory.

Demos

- Demo 2006
- Demo 2007
- Demo 2008
