= ...And I Return to Nothingness =

EP by Lorna Shore
- Released: August 13, 2021
- Studios: Random Awesome! Studios, Bay City, Michigan
- Genres: Blackened deathcore; symphonic black metal
- Length: 18:02
- Label: Century Media
- Producer: Josh Schroeder

Lorna Shore chronology
Immortal (2020)	...And I Return to Nothingness (2021)	Pain Remains (2022)

Singles from ...And I Return to Nothingness
- 1. "To the Hellfire" Released: June 11, 2021

...And I Return to Nothingness is the fourth EP by the American deathcore band Lorna Shore. It was released on August 13, 2021 through Century Media Records and was produced by Josh Schroeder. The EP is their first release featuring new vocalist Will Ramos, as well as rhythm guitarist Andrew O'Connor, who joined just prior to the release of Immortal.

== Background and promotion ==
On June 11, 2021, the band returned with a new song titled "To the Hellfire", and announced Ramos as their new permanent vocalist. They also announced details of the new EP. It is the band's first EP since their breakthrough 2013 release Maleficium.

"To the Hellfire" became a viral success for the band, peaking at number 1 on the iTunes metal chart in its first week of release. It was also voted by the readers of Revolver as the "Best Song of 2021 So Far" with writer Eli Enis calling it "one of the most over-the-top heavy deathcore songs in recent memory. It would also go on to overtake "Immortal" as the band's most streamed song on Spotify at over 4 million streams. It was elected by Loudwire as the best metal song of 2021.

== Critical reception ==
Professional ratings
Review scores
Source	Rating
Distorted Sound	9/10
Rock 'N' Load	10/10
Wall of Sound	10/10

The EP received acclaim from critics. Dan McHugh from Distorted Sound stated that "For a band that have endured considerable adversity to get to this point, ...And I Return To Nothingness is one hell of a statement to reassure everyone that Lorna Shore are going absolutely nowhere. The acquisition of Ramos is going to send the quartet soaring to new heights, and the new material sounds as invigorating and vicious as ever. The only minor downside is that there are only three tracks to sink your teeth into, but if this offering is anything to go by then whatever follows is going to knock our teeth down our throats." Rock 'N' Load praised the EP saying, "Lorna Shore have done what many bands fail to. For most, the rockiness of the last two years would have been enough for them to call it a day, but by preserving and fighting against the odds, Lorna Shore have created a new standard for a genre that is becoming increasingly oversaturated by repetitive sound. From the outright incredible musicianship of all members and the slightly over the top, theatrical approach the band have taken with their evolved sound, I'm confident in saying Lorna Shore will become one of Deathcore's largest titans." Ricky Aarons writing for Wall of Sound reviewed the EP and title track stating: "The band continue with the epic vehicle of destruction, but change tact slightly, in a way that's reminiscent of their previous work... The technical detail and speed to the riffs are incredible. Once again Ramos doesn't skip a detail in every lyric he sounds... He considers which lines end in a high or low and these minute details are make-or-break. Instead of the song focusing on breakdown ferocity it's more about stead-fast blast beats and the technical element of this wonderful band."

=== Scholarly analysis ===
A 2023 academic study published by researchers at the University of Huddersfield analyzes the song "To the Hellfire," examining its rhythmic density, vocal techniques, and compositional structure as examples of contemporary deathcore extremity. The authors based their analysis on the isolated multitrack recordings made publicly available through the Nail the Mix education platform.

== Track listing ==
No.	Title	Length
1.	"To the Hellfire"	6:09
2.	"Of the Abyss"	5:43
3.	"...And I Return to Nothingness"	6:10
Total length:		18:02

== Personnel ==
Lorna Shore

- Will Ramos – vocals
- Adam De Micco – lead guitar, bass
- Andrew O'Connor – rhythm guitar, bass
- Austin Archey – drums

Additional personnel

- Josh Schroeder – production

== Charts ==
Chart (2025)	Peak position
Greek Albums (IFPI)	65
