= Immortal Disfigurement =

American deathcore band

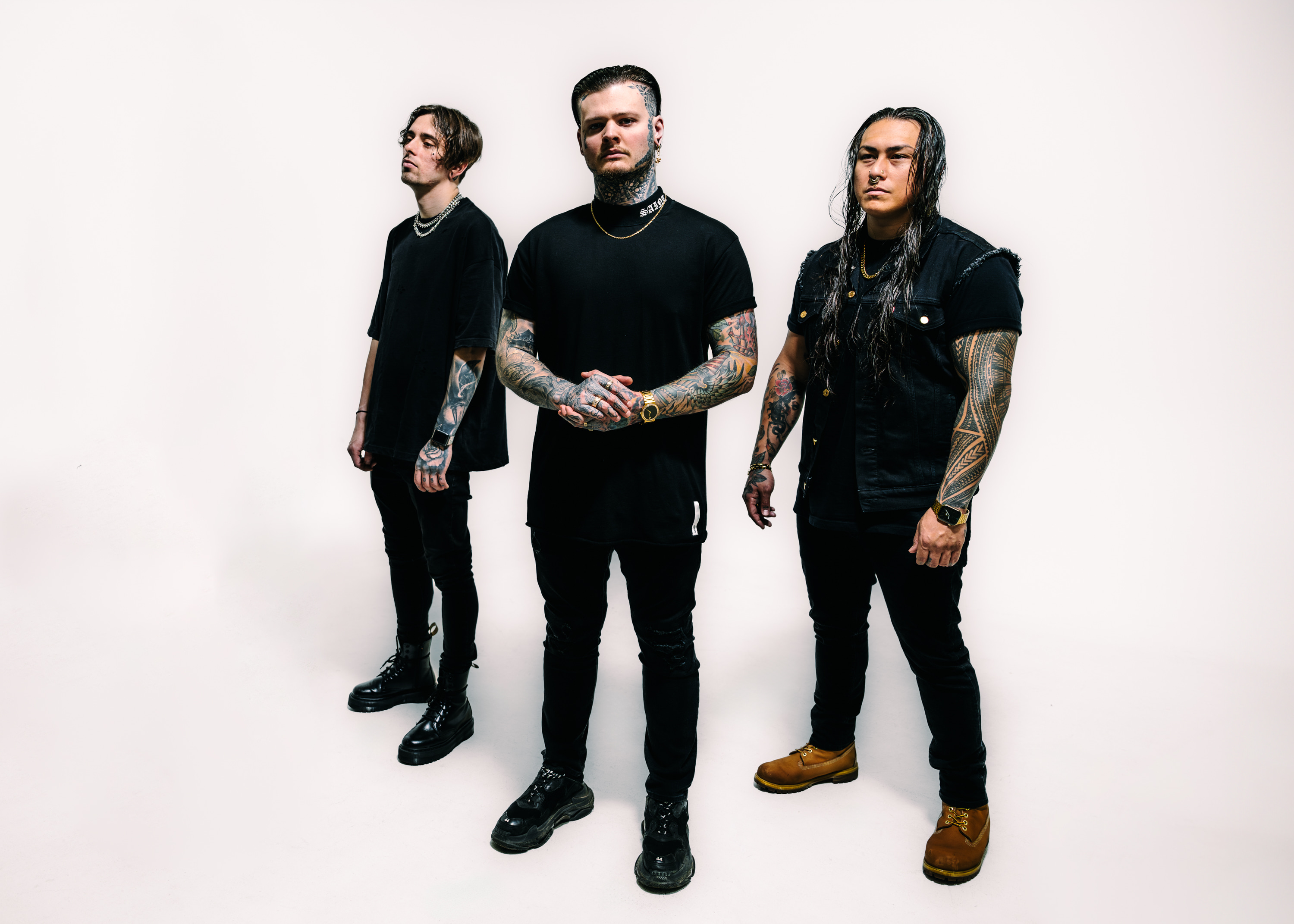
- Immortal Disfigurement in 2024. From Left to Right: Josh Freeman, CJ McCreery, Shane Slade

Background information
- Origin: Pittsburgh, Pennsylvania, U.S.
- Genres: Deathcore; symphonic deathcore
- Years active: 2021–present
- Labels: Seek and Strike
- Spinoff of: Lorna Shore; Signs of the Swarm; A Wake in Providence
- Members: CJ McCreery; Josh Freeman; Shane Slade; Suki; Jacob Toy
- Past members: James "Jimmy" Pino; Leo McClain; Harry Tadayon

Immortal Disfigurement is an American deathcore band, formed in 2021 by vocalist CJ McCreery and guitarist Josh Freeman. The band is known as part of the symphonic deathcore scene. The group currently consists of CJ McCreery on vocals, Josh Freeman and Jacob Toy on guitars, Shane Slade on bass and Suki on drums.

== History ==
Immortal Disfigurement was formed by CJ McCreery, known as the former vocalist of Signs of the Swarm and Lorna Shore, alongside guitarist Josh Freeman (ex-A Wake in Providence) and bassist Shane Slade (Winds of Plague, ex-Molotov Solution), releasing their debut single "Dragged Through the Inferno", featuring orchestration by Misstiq, on April 18, 2022. Worm Shepherd members Leo McClain (drums) and Harry Tadayon (guitars, orchestrations) would soon join the band, and another single "King" was released on 27 August 2023. The single would be the title track of their debut full-length album King, which was released on June 7, 2024, after being delayed due to payment issues towards Harry Tadayon, who has since left the band.

The band released a new single titled "Gospel of Annihilation" on May 2, 2025, and it came with the announcement that they have been signed to Seek and Strike Records. The band performed their first show in Finland at Rockfest on June 14, 2025. Guitarist Jacob Toy, also formerly of Signs of the Swarm, was announced to have joined the band on September 23, 2025, a month before their new EP Hell Is Right in Front of Us, released on October 17.

== Band members ==
Current

- CJ McCreery – vocals (2021–present)
- Josh Freeman – guitars (2021–present)
- Shane Slade – bass (2021–present)
- Suki – drums (2024–present)
- Jacob Toy – guitars (2025–present)

Former

- James "Jimmy" Pino – drums (2021–2022)
- Leo McClain – drums (2022–2024)
- Harry Tadayon – guitars, orchestrations (2022–2024)

== Discography ==
=== Studio albums ===
- King (2024)

=== EPs ===
- Hell Is Right in Front of Us (2025)

=== Singles ===
- "Dragged Through the Inferno" (2022)
- "There Is No Light" (2023)
- "King" (2023)
- "Force-Fed" (2023)
- "Showcase ov Phlegm" (2024)
- "Gospel of Annihilation" (2025)
- "Hellhole" (2025)
