= Psalms (Lorna Shore album) =

Studio album by Lorna Shore
- Released: June 9, 2015
- Studio: The Machine Shop, Belleville, New Jersey, U.S.
- Genre: Blackened deathcore; technical death metal
- Length: 39:54
- Label: Density
- Producer: Will Putney

Lorna Shore chronology
Maleficium (2013)	Psalms (2015)	Flesh Coffin (2017)

Singles from Psalms
- 1. "Grimoire" Released: May 5, 2015

Psalms is the debut studio album by the American deathcore band Lorna Shore. It was released on June 9, 2015 through Density Records, their only album with the label, and was produced by Will Putney.

== Critical reception ==
Professional ratings
Review scores
Source	Rating
KillYourStereo	3/5 stars
New Transcendence	9.5/10
WSOU	4.5/5

The album received mostly positive reviews from critics. KillYourStereo rated the album 3 out of 5 and said: "It would be going too far to say that Lorna Shore's Psalms is a bad album. All the successful elements of a deathcore album are there and they're executed skillfully. Unfortunately, the abundance of breakdowns that pop up literally stop the album in its tracks. With material from Aversions Crown and Black Tongue managing to showcase new elements in the genre, it's a shame that Lorna Shore fail to bring anything fresh to the table." New Noise gave the album a positive review but stated: "That's how most of these tracks feel. If you took out the breakdowns, or at least minimized their lengths, you would be left with one of, if not the best, deathcore bands around. Lorna Shore isn't just technically impressive; they try to write good, meaningful songs. However, when you stick in one or more drastic and unfortunate shifts in sound a song (i.e., breakdowns), you aren't great songwriters. If Lorna Shore can shore up further what makes them great (the horrifying mood, the musical ability), then deathcore could have a new shining star. As it stands, this is either a wonderfully competent breakdown-filled ride or a disappointment for what it could have been."

New Transcendence praised the album saying, "Lorna Shore have crafted a lurid, loathsome lesson in lacerating heavy music that bands of all styles and genres could learn from. With atmosphere and melody enough to appease fans of melo-death and sludge, but with raw, ruthless punch for those plotting to turn their parent's living room into a mosh pit, Psalms is pure punishment and infernal aggression that no prayer or person in the sky can save the listener from—that is, if they even want to be saved."

V13.net reviewer Daniella Kohan stated in an unrated review for the album, "New Jersey’s Lorna Shore is not a band for the faint of heart, and their first full-length offering, Psalms, follows in that same vein. Their unique genre-bending style of blackened technical deathcore really comes into its own on this album, maintaining consistency as well as an overpowering disposition for slow, chuggy breakdowns."

== Track listing ==
No.	Title	Length
1.	"Grimoire"	4:50
2.	"Harvest Realms"	3:32
3.	"Throne of Worms"	4:07
4.	"White Noise"	4:13
5.	"From the Pale Mist"	3:53
6.	"Infernal Haunting"	3:44
7.	"Death Gowns"	3:19
8.	"Wretching in Torment"	3:33
9.	"Traces of Supremacy"	3:28
10.	"Eternally Oblivion"	5:15
Total length:		39:54

== Personnel ==
Credits adapted from AllMusic.

Lorna Shore

- Tom Barber – vocals
- Adam De Micco – lead guitar
- Connor Deffley – rhythm guitar
- Gary Herrera – bass
- Austin Archey – drums

Additional personnel

- Will Putney – production, mixing, mastering
- Tom Smith Jr. and Randy Leboeuf – engineering
- Steven Seid – editing
- Mike Mowery and Wayne Pighini – management
- Matt Andersen – booking
- JSS – art conception, layout

== Charts ==
Chart (2015)	Peak position
US Heatseekers Albums (Billboard)	23
