= Distant (band) =

Deathcore band

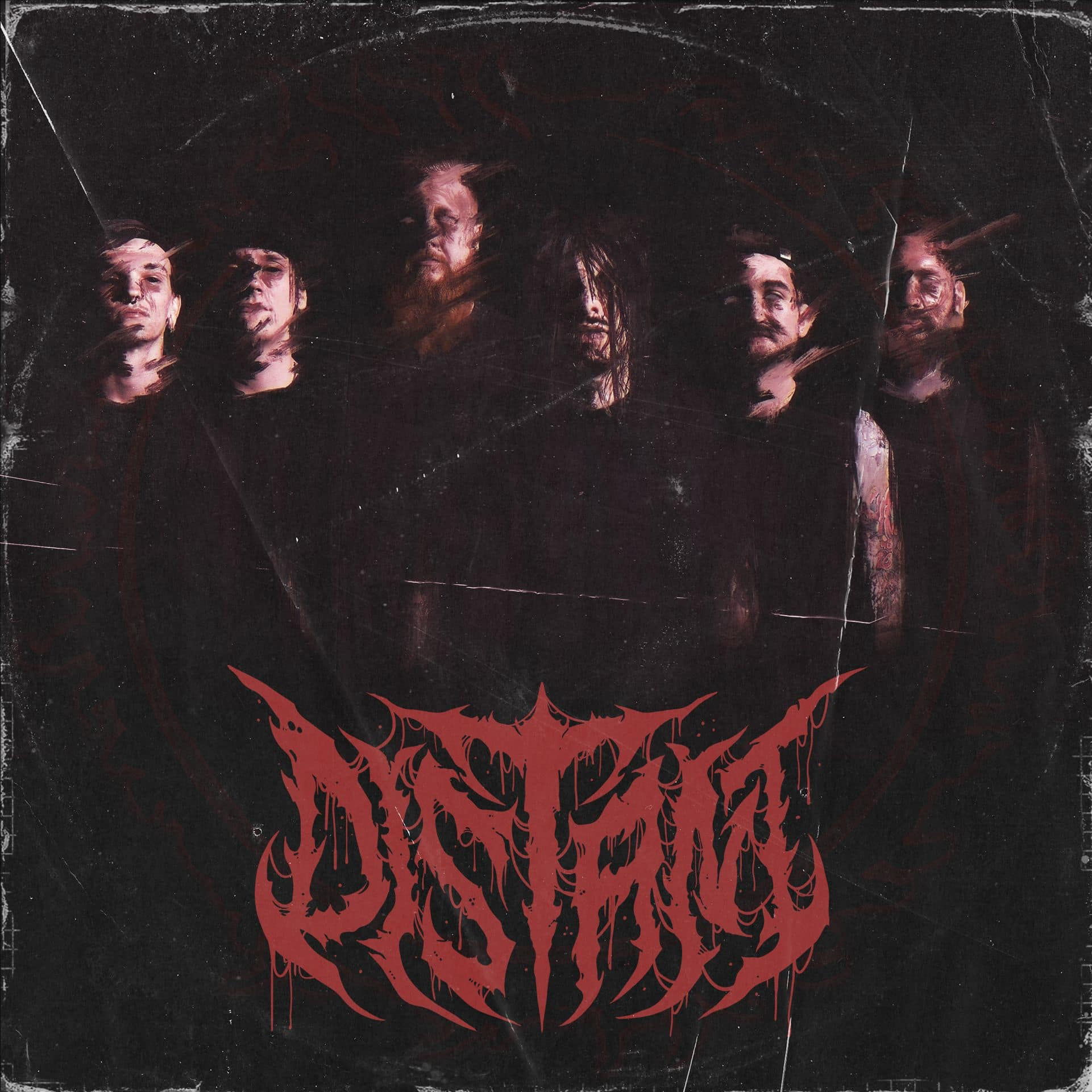

Background information
- Origin: Rotterdam, Netherlands; Bratislava, Slovakia
- Genre: Deathcore
- Years active: 2014–present
- Label: Century Media
- Members: Nouri Yetgin; Elmer Maurits; Alan Grnja; René Gerbrandij
- Past members: Shainel Ramharakh; Gene Troost; Vladimir Golic; Jan Matos
- Website: distantofficial.com

Distant is a deathcore band from the Netherlands and Slovakia formed in 2014.

Formed in 2014, the band's first album, Tyrannotophia, came out in 2019 via Unique Leader Records. Two years later, they released Aeons of Oblivion. In 2023, they released their third album Heritage after signing with Century Media Records.

In 2024, they released Tsukuyomi: The Origin, a reimagined version of their 2017 EP Tsukuyomi. The album features appearances from Alex Erian of Despised Icon, Matt Heafy of Trivium, David Simonich of Signs of the Swarm and Travis Worland of Enterprise Earth.

== Band members ==
=== Current ===
- Nouri Yetgin – guitars
- Elmer Maurits – bass
- Alan Grnja – vocals
- René Gerbrandij – drums

=== Former ===
- Shainel Ramharakh – drums
- Gene Troost – guitars
- Vladimir Golic – guitars
- Jan Matos – drums

== Discography ==
=== Studio albums ===
- Tyrannotophia (2019)
- Aeons of Oblivion (2021)
- Heritage (2023)
- Tsukuyomi: The Origin (2024)
- Into Despair (2026)

=== EPs ===
- Slither (2015)
- Tsukuyomi (2017)
- Dawn of Corruption (2020)
- Dusk of Anguish (2021)
