= A Wake in Providence (band) =

American deathcore band

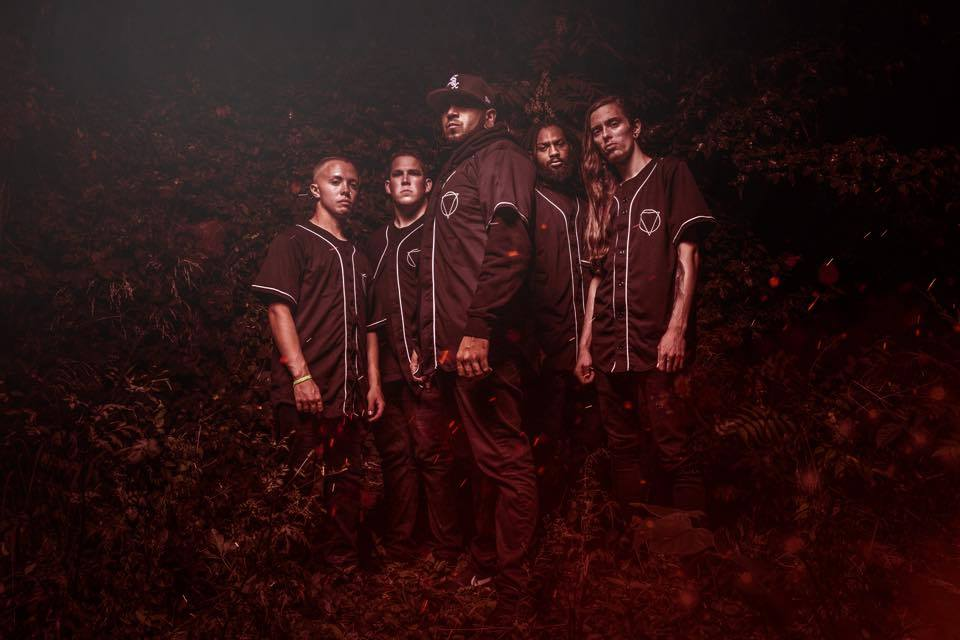
- A Wake in Providence in 2015. From Left to Right: Brandon Ricardo, Owen Hayes, Chris Gonzalez, D'Andre Tyre and Josh Freeman

Background information
- Also known as: AWIP
- Origin: Staten Island, New York, U.S.
- Genres: Deathcore; blackened deathcore; symphonic deathcore
- Years active: 2010–present
- Labels: Unique Leader Records; Outerloop
- Members: D'Andre Tyre; Jordan Felion; Jessie McEnneny; Christian Mangrum
- Past members: Adam Echevarrias; Alex Vinamagua; Demetrio Lopez; Frank Altieri; Tom Smith Jr.; Jon Denton; Chris Gonzalez; Owen Hayes; Brandon Ricardo; Josh Freeman; Will Ramos; Anthony Dipietro; Adam Mercer
- Website: awakeinprovidence.com

A Wake in Providence is an American deathcore band formed in 2010 in Staten Island, New York City. The band currently consists of vocalist/guitarist D'Andre Tyre, guitarist Jordan Felion, bassist Christian Mangrum and drummer Jessie McEnneny. The band has released four studio albums with their latest being I Write to You, My Darling Decay, released on July 26, 2024, through Unique Leader Records. The band has also released two EPs.

== History ==
=== Formation, early releases, and signing to Outerloop Records (2010–2018) ===
A Wake in Providence was formed in 2010 in Staten Island. After they recruited guitarists Josh Freeman in 2011 and Tom Smith Jr. in 2012, they independently released two EPs titled Serpents (2012) and Insidious (2015). The band released a single titled "Psycho" on November 16, 2013, featuring Immoralist vocalist, Davis Rider. After vocalist Chris Gonzalez left in 2016, the band hired Will Ramos (ex-vocalist of Secrets Don't Sleep, later known as the current vocalist of Lorna Shore) as their new vocalist. The band would release their first single with him titled "The Imperfect: Iconoclast" on July 6, 2016. On February 24, 2017, the band announced that they are signing to Outerloop Records and released their first single with them titled "A Darkened Gospel". On October 27, 2017, the band released their debut studio album, Insidious: Phase II. The album is a re-recording of the 2015 EP Insidious along with a re-recording of the 2013 single "Psycho". The re-recorded Psycho features Shadow of Intent vocalist, Ben Duerr. The album also features a brand-new song titled "Ov Hell" which features Spite vocalist, Darius Tehrani. Guitarist D'Andre Tyre states that the Insidious EP is what helped the band get bigger and they believe that want to really highlight it and give it a new flare.

=== The Blvck Sun||The Blood Moon, signing to Unique Leader Records and Eternity (2018–2022) ===
Ramos left in 2018 to join Monument of a Memory. Adam Mercer from Entombed in the Abyss was recruited as the new vocalist. The band released their second studio album titled The Blvck Sun||The Blood Moon with him on March 22, 2019. The album features guest vocals from former Aversions Crown vocalist, Mark Poida and Thy Art is Murder vocalist CJ McMahon. The band would go on a hiatus before announcing that they are signing to Unique Leader Records on April 22, 2022, and released a single titled "Godkiller". The band released another single on August 11, 2022, titled "The Horror ov the Old Gods" along with the announcement of their third studio album Eternity which was released on October 21, 2022. The band released another single from the album titled "We Are Eternity" on September 23, 2022. Godkiller and Eternity would see the band's departure from their original deathcore sound and move onto symphonic deathcore.

=== I Write to You, My Darling Decay and lineup changes (2024–present) ===
In 2023, the band took part in the Suffer Forever Tour with AngelMaker, Vulvodynia, Falsifier and Carcosa. They also took part in Oceano's tour for the 15th anniversary of their debut album Depths and Signs of the Swarm's tour for their 10th anniversary. On May 21, 2024, the band released a single titled "Mournful Benediction" featuring Shadow of Intent vocalist Ben Duerr, along with the announcement of their fourth studio album I Write to You, My Darling Decay which was released on July 26, 2024. The album's second single titled "Agonofinis" was released on June 25, 2024.

In May 2025, the band announced the departure of vocalist Adam Mercer. On November 14, 2025, the band announced a new lineup which features guitarist D'Andre Tyre taking over lead vocals and a new bassist, Christian Mangrum. Along with the announcement, the band also released a new single titled "SOL & IRE".

== Band members ==
Current

- D'Andre Tyre – lead vocals (2025–present), lead guitar (2010–present), bass (2016–2025; studio only), clean vocals (2018–2025)
- Jordan Felion – rhythm guitar (2017–present)
- Jessie McEnneny – drums (2019–present)
- Christian Mangrum – bass (2025–present)

Former

- Chris Gonzalez – lead vocals (2010–2016)
- Jon Denton – drums (2010–2014)
- Demetrio Lopez – bass (2010–2012)
- Adam Echevarrias – rhythm guitar (2010–2011)
- Alex Vinamagua – rhythm guitar (2011)
- Josh Freeman – rhythm guitar (2011–2017)
- Frank Altieri – bass (2012–2013)
- Tom Smith Jr. – third guitar (2012–2014)
- Owen Hayes – bass (2013–2016)
- Brandon Ricardo – drums (2014–2016)
- Will Ramos – lead vocals (2016–2018)
- Anthony Dipietro – drums (2016–2018)
- Adam Mercer – lead vocals (2018–2025)

Timeline

== Discography ==
Studio Albums
Title	Album details
Insidious: Phase II	Released: October 27, 2017; Label: Outerloop Records; Format: Digital
The Blvck Sun||The Blood Moon	Released: March 22, 2019; Label: Outerloop Records; Format: Digital
Eternity	Released: October 21, 2022; Label: Unique Leader Records; Format: Digital
I Write to You, My Darling Decay	Released: July 26, 2024; Label: Unique Leader Records; Format: Digital

EPs
Title	EP details
Serpents	Released: November 24, 2012; Label: Independent; Format: Digital
Insidious	Released: June 23, 2015; Label: Independent; Format: Digital

Singles

- "A Mirror Never Lies" (2011)
- "Through the Eyes of a Traitor" (2013)
- "Psycho (feat. Davis Rider)" (2013)
- "The Imperfect: Iconoclast" (2016)
- "A Darkened Gospel" (2017)
- "Godkiller" (2022)
- "The Horror ov the Old Gods" (2022)
- "We Are Eternity" (2022)
- "Mournful Benediction (feat. Ben Duerr)" (2024)
- "Agonofinis" (2024)
- "SOL & IRE" (2025)
