= 156/Silence =

American metalcore band

- Origin: Pittsburgh, Pennsylvania
- Genres: Metalcore; post-hardcore; hardcore punk
- Years active: 2015–present
- Labels: SharpTone; Pure Noise
- Members: Jimmy Howell; Mike Ernst; Jack Murray; Ryan Wilkinson; Kyle O'Connell
- Past members: Evan Wall; Zac Dranko; Aleks Pihl; Maxwell Bradshaw; Christian Snow; Lukas Booker

156/Silence is an American metalcore band from Pittsburgh founded in 2015.

== History ==
Founded in 2015, they released their debut EP Unrequited, Unrefuted, and Undeniably - I'm Alone before releasing their debut album And Everything Was Beautiful in 2016. Undercover Scumbag was released in 2018 with an entirely different lineup that would later go on to release Irrational Pull in 2020 and Narrative in 2022. In 2024, they released their fourth album, People Watching, which was noted for moving more towards metalcore and away from their previous hardcore style.

In March 2025, the band announced that bassist Lukas Booker had died unexpectedly. However, they stated that they would still continue with their plans to tour alongside Silent Planet and Invent Animate.

== Band members ==
=== Current lineup ===
- Jimmy Howell – guitar, backing vocals (2015–present), analog synth (2020-present)
- Mike Ernst – vocals (2015–2017), bass, backing vocals (2025–present)
- Jack Murray – vocals (2018–present)
- Ryan Wilkinson – guitar, backing vocals (2018–present)
- Kyle O'Connell – bass (2019–2020), drums (2020–present)

=== Former members ===
- Evan Wall – guitar, backing vocals (2015–2016)
- Zac Dranko – drums (2015–2017), backing vocals (2015–2016)
- Aleks Pihl – bass, backing vocals (2015–2018)
- Maxwell Bradshaw – drums (2017–2020)
- Christian Snow – bass (2018–2020)
- Lukas Booker – bass, backing vocals (2020–2025) (died 2025)

== Discography ==
=== Studio albums ===
List of studio albums, with selected details
Title	Album details	Peak chart positions
Title	Album details	AUS
And Everything Was Beautiful	Released: July 22, 2016; Label: Self-released	—
Undercover Scumbag	Released: September 14, 2018; Label: Innerstrength	—
Irrational Pull	Released: June 6, 2020; Label: Self-released	—
Narrative	Released: September 2, 2022; Label: SharpTone	—
People Watching	Released: September 13, 2024; Label: SharpTone	—
From a Distance	Released: September 4, 2026; Label: Pure Noise	50

=== Extended plays ===
List of extended plays, with selected details
Title	EP details
Unrequited, Unrefuted, and Undeniably – I'm Alone	Released: November 7, 2015; Label: Self-released
Karma	Released: May 12, 2017; Label: Self-released
Spicy Boys Split (with Hot Gospel)	Released: October 4, 2017; Label: Self-released
Don't Hold Your Breath	Released: October 29, 2021; Label: SharpTone Records

=== Singles ===
List of singles
Title	Year	Album
"Turmoil"	2017	Karma
"Irrational Pull"	2020	Irrational Pull
"Conflict of Interest"	2020	Irrational Pull
"Upset / Unfed"	2020	Irrational Pull
"High Dive in a Low Well"	2020	Irrational Pull
"Vexation"	2020	Irrational Pull (Deluxe)
"No Angel"	2020	Irrational Pull (Deluxe)
"The Wrong Sense"	2021	Don't Hold Your Breath
"Coup de Grâce"	2021	Don't Hold Your Breath
"A Past Embrace"	2022	Narrative
"For All to Blame"	2022	Narrative
"To Take Your Place"	2022	Narrative
"Say The Phrase"	2022	Narrative
"If Pleasure's Gone"	2022	Narrative
"Unreasonable Doubt"	2024	People Watching
"Better Written Villain"	2024	People Watching
"Product Placement"	2024	People Watching
"Character Development"	2024	People Watching
"Wants I Need" (featuring Craig Owens)	2024	People Watching
"Our Parting Ways"	2025	Non-album single
"No Arms"	2026	From a Distance
"Proxy Idols"	2026	From a Distance
"Swept From Under (Call of the Void)"	2026	From a Distance
"From a Distance" (featuring Alex Reade)	2026	From a Distance
