= To the Grave (band) =

Australian deathcore band

To The Grave
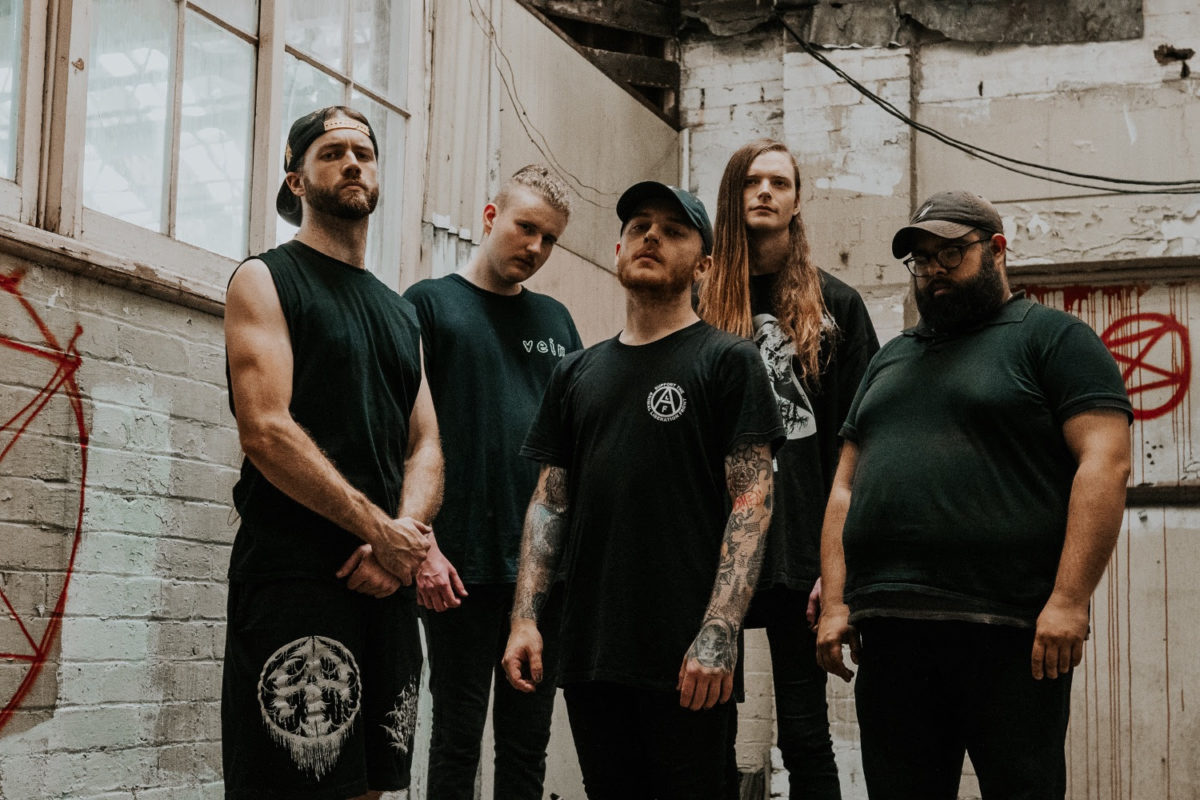
- To The Grave

Background information
- Origin: Sydney, Australia
- Genres: Deathcore; metalcore (early)
- Years active: 2010–present
- Labels: BlkIIBlk; Unique Leader
- Members: Dane Evans; Jack Simioni; Nic Webb; Matt Clarke; Raymond Martin
- Past members: Jeffrey Martinez; Matt Murphy; Josh Booth; Luke Ringin; John Flaws; Tom Cadden; Simon O'Malley; Rangi Barnes
- Website: tothegraveau.com

To The Grave is an Australian deathcore band formed in 2010 in Sydney. The band's lineup currently consists of vocalist Dane Evans, guitarists Jack Simioni and Nic Webb, bassist Matt Clarke and drummer Raymond Martin. The band have released six studio albums with their latest being Liberation Front. They have also released four EPs, one split-EP, one live album and one demo. They signed to BlkIIBlk Records in June 2026.

== History ==
To The Grave was formed in 2010 in Sydney. The band released a two-track demo in 2013, which was then followed by their debut EP titled Lest Ye Be Judged and a split album with Lynchmada and I Am Atlas which were both released the same year. The band released their debut album titled Expect Resistance on May 31, 2014. In May 2014, the band announced that they had parted ways with vocalist Matt Murphy, In October 2014 the band announced that Dane Evans (formerly of To Engineer an Exorcist) joined the band as their new vocalist.

On October 1, 2015, the band released a single titled "Born Dead" featuring guest vocals from ex-A Night in Texas vocalist Rheese Peters. On September 27, 2016, the band released an EP titled No Lives Matter. The band would go on a hiatus before releasing a single titled "Pest Control" on January 21, 2019. Two more singles titled "Skin Like Pigs" and "Slaughter Forever" were released on February 21, 2019 and May 1, 2019 respectively. On September 26, 2019, the band released a single titled "Ecocide" and announced that their second studio album titled Global Warning would be released on November 8, 2019. Another single from the album titled "Wastage" was released in October 2019. Bassist Josh Booth died on May 28, 2020, at the age of 23. On October 23, 2020, the band released a single titled "Miserable Summer", its music video featured late bassist Josh Booth and was released posthumously. On February 18, 2021, the band announced that they had signed to Unique Leader Records and that their third studio album titled Epilogue would be released on April 16, 2021. Epilogue also features re-recorded tracks from the Global Warning LP, a single titled "(•REC)" was also released that same day. Another single off the album titled "Terrorist Threat" was released on March 11, 2021.

On November 4, 2022, the band announced their Director's Cuts album, which was released on February 24, 2023 and showcased the first single titled "Red Dot Sight". Two more singles followed titled "Axe Of Kindness" and "Cut Off The Head" which were released on December 6, 2022 and January 20, 2023 respectively. In Celebration of the two-year anniversery of the Epilogue album, the band released a live album of them performing their favourite tracks from the album live at The Brain Studios titled Hear Evil, See Evil: The Epilogue Session on April 23, 2023. On June 22, 2023, the band announced that they will be releasing an EP titled Offcuts along with a deluxe edition of Director's Cuts on September 15, 2023, a single titled Shock Tactics (1000v) was released along with the announcement. Another single followed titled "Deadskin Skimask" which was released on August 15, 2023 and featured guest vocals from Jake Kennedy of StabonSight.

The band released their fifth studio album, Everyone's a Murderer, on August 30, 2024 and released a single, "Dead Wrong", which featured guest vocals from Michael Kearney of Empty Cages and 10 to the Chest on June 27, 2024. The second single off the album was "Burn Your Local Butcher", which was released on July 30, 2024. A music video for the song "Made in Aus" was released on August 30, 2024 coinciding with the album release. On February 13, 2025, the band released a single titled "Forced Diet Reassignment". Another single followed titled "Sawed Off" released on April 2, 2025. The third single titled "Show Them The Bodies" was released on June 3, 2025, along with the announcement of the EP, Everyone's Still a Murderer, which was released on August 1, 2025.

On June 10, 2026, the band released their new single "Eyestalk Ablations" and signed to BlkIIBlk Records. On July 8, the band released another new single, "Nail Mary", and revealed their sixth studio album, Liberation Front, would be released on October 2.

== Lyrical themes ==
The band's lyrical themes often focuses on veganism, animal cruelty, human impact on the environment, human extinction, ecology, misanthropy and animal rights.

== Band members ==
Current

- Dane Evans – lead vocals
- Jack Simioni – guitars
- Nic Webb – guitars
- Matt Clarke – bass
- Raymond Martin – drums

Former

- Jeffrey Martinez – guitars
- Matt Murphy – lead vocals
- Josh Booth – bass; died 2020
- Luke Ringin – guitars
- John Flaws – guitars
- Tom Cadden – guitars
- Simon O'Malley – drums
- Rangi Barnes – drums

== Discography ==
Studio Albums

- Expect Resistance (2014)
- Global Warning (2019)
- Epilogue (2021)
- Director's Cuts (2023)
- Everyone's a Murderer (2024)
- Liberation Front (2026)

Other Releases

- 2 Track Promo (Demo, 2013)
- Lest Ye Be Judged (EP, 2013)
- III (Split w/ Lynchmada and I Am Atlas, 2013)
- No Lives Matter (EP, 2016)
- Hear Evil, See Evil: The Epilogue Session (Live album, 2023)
- Offcuts (EP, 2023)
- Everyone's Still a Murderer [also released as Still] (EP, 2025)

Singles

- "Born Dead (feat. Rheese Peters)" (2015)
- "Pest Control" (2019)
- "Skin Like Pigs" (2019)
- "Slaughter Forever" (2019)
- "Ecocide" (2019)
- "Wastage" (2019)
- "Miserable Summer" (2020)
- "[•REC]" (2021)
- "Terrorist Threat" (2021)
- "Red Dot Sight" (2022)
- "Axe of Kindness" (2022)
- "Cut Off the Head" (2023)
- "Shock Tactics [1000v]" (2023)
- "Deadskin Skimask (feat. Jake Kennedy)" (2023)
- "Dead Wrong (feat. Michael Kearney)" (2024)
- "Burn Your Local Butcher" (2024)
- "Forced Diet Reassignment" (2025)
- "Sawed Off" (2025)
- "Show Them The Bodies" (2025)
- "EYESTALK ABLATIONS" (2026)
- "Nail Mary" (2026)
