= Cope Notes =

Virtual mental health service

- Company type: Private
- Industry: Telehealth
- Founded: 2018; 8 years ago
- Founders: Johnny Crowder
- Area served: Worldwide
- Website: www.copenotes.com

Cope Notes is an American telehealth-based mental health service. The company "sends subscribers positive thoughts and affirmations to help combat depression and anxiety". Each message contains psychology facts, exercises, and journaling prompts that are "reviewed, edited and approved by a panel of mental health professionals".

As of March 2026, Cope Notes had over 46,000 users across 110 countries. Through that same date, the service reported having sent over 5.5 million messages to its subscribers.

== History ==
Cope Notes was founded in 2018 by Johnny Crowder, an American musician, public speaker, and Certified Recovery Peer Specialist. According to the Tampa Bay Times, the company "sends subscribers positive thoughts and affirmations to help combat depression and anxiety". The content is sent via text message at least once per day, at random times. According to the company's FAQ, each message is "reviewed, edited and approved by a panel of mental health professionals". Users are encouraged to respond to the messages, using the text thread as a journal.

The idea for Cope Notes began as an unnamed in-person support group, which formed after Crowder graduated from college. That group transitioned into a virtual peer support group, where many attendees opted into the SMS option, influencing Crowder to create a mental health-based texting service. Crowder, a touring musician, used his time traveling between performances with his heavy metal bands, Dark Sermon and Prison, to develop the service. The development of Cope Notes was also influenced by Crowder's interactions with fans at shows, some of whom were combatting issues like substance abuse, tailoring the service to meet their needs.

In a 2025 Tampa Bay Business Journal article, it was reported that Cope Notes' services were included in UnitedHealthcare's Florida Medicaid contract, partnering with UnitedHealthcare for a five-year statewide agreement. Cope Notes had previously signed a one-year pilot contract with UnitedHealth Group, distributing its services through UnitedHealthcare and Optum, which primarily benefitted teens, pregnant and expecting mothers, and low-income households. Member surveys from the pilot showed that 82% of respondents identified Cope Notes to be "helpful" or "very helpful". The contract followed an 18-month period of due dilligence by UnitedHealthcare, where the company reviewed the code, security infrastructure, and text message library of Cope Notes. As part of the 2025 contract extension, Medicaid recipients in Tampa, Lakeland, Ocala, Jacksonville, and Miami were able to receive the service at no cost.

=== Studies ===
In May 2022, a study was published in the Journal of Medical Internet Research where researchers found a majority of participants in the study "appreciate the service for reframing their mental wellness (86%) with statistically significant correlations between personality and acceptability of the service", while some participants "prefer a more personalized experience" (14%).

In March 2023, a study was published in the Journal of Mental Health where researchers found that "participants with severe depression experienced a significant decrease in anxiety and depressive symptoms, as well as perceived stress" and "showed a significant increase in emotional intelligence" after using Cope Notes for 1 month. Participants with mild to moderate symptoms also experienced an "increase in overall coping and problem-focused coping skills". The study's participants consisted of 64 people, a majority of whom were white women and students attending the University of South Florida.

In 2025, a case study was published on the effects of Cope Notes amongst the faculty, staff, and students of over 100 Pasco, Desoto, and Charlotte county district schools where the service was distributed for free, resulting in 98.8% of respondents to a survey feeling "more positive and supported" and 85.4% of respondents stating that they used the service daily. The study was initiated by a 2024 partnership between Cope Notes and the Central Florida Behavioral Health Network, which was later extended in 2025 and again in 2026.

== Recognition ==
In 2020, Cope Notes was recognized as an honoree as part of Tampa Bay Inno's Inno On Fire awards.

In 2022, Cope Notes won the People's Choice award at the Startup of the Year summit, a national competition featuring tech firms, venture investors, and startups across the United States. The company was also ranked within the top 15 amongst the 100 semi-finalists recognized by the competition.

In 2024, the company was recognized as an honoree at the Tampa Bay Inno Awards, under the category of Healthtech.
