= Hatchet (band) =

American thrash metal band

- Origin: San Francisco, California, U.S.
- Genre: Thrash metal
- Years active: 2005–present
- Labels: Metal Blade; The End; Combat; M-Theory Audio
- Members: Julz Ramos; Ben Smith; Clayton Cagle; Devin Reiche
- Past members: Marcus Kirchen; Sterling Bailey; Jon Fryman; Clark Webb; Lou Bianco; Dan Voigt; Ryan King; Travis Russey; Joey Karpowicz; Kody Barba; Dave Wert; Alex Perez; Eli Lucas

Hatchet is an American thrash metal band from San Francisco, California, formed in January 2005 by guitarist and vocalist Julz Ramos, the band's only remaining original member. They have released four studio albums, two demos and two EPs, and were part of the thrash metal revival of the late 2000s. Influenced by the new wave of British heavy metal and Bay Area thrash metal scenes of the 1980s, Hatchet's music has been described as "old-school thrash metal".

== History ==
Hatchet was formed in January 2005, and recorded their first demo, Frailty of the Flesh, the following year. Their second demo, Frailty Demo, and a self-titled EP were released in 2007. These releases and an appearance on the Thrash Metal Warriors compilation and shows in the Bay Area opening for Possessed attracted the attention of Metal Blade Records, who released the band's debut album, Awaiting Evil, in May 2008. Awaiting Evil received positive reviews from the music press. The band went on hiatus several months after the release of the album. By early 2009, Ramos reformed Hatchet with Sterling Bailey on guitar, singer Eric Lundgren, bassist Ryan King, and drummer Alex Perez. Following this, the band toured the US with Havok.

Five years later, after more member changes and switching from Metal Blade to The End, the band released their second album, Dawn of the End, in March 2013. The album received good reviews. Hatchet toured to support the album, reportedly playing over 200 shows with Soilwork, the Jeff Loomis Band, Blackguard, Trivium, Flotsam and Jetsam, Exmortus, Warbringer, Havok, Lich King, Black Tide, Cellador and Threat Signal. The success of Dawn of the End resulted in Hatchet's first music video, "Signals of Infection".

Hatchet's third album, Fear Beyond Lunacy, was released on October 30, 2015, their first and only release with the lineup of Ramos, Clayton Cagle on guitar, bassist Kody Barba, and drummer Ben Smith. Fear Beyond Lunacy was well received by the music press. Blabbermouth.net described it as "a well-performed replication of classic San Fran thrash, reminiscent of Testament, Death Angel, Heathen and Exodus along with L.A.'s Agent Steel." To promote Fear Beyond Lunacy, music videos were shot for "In Fear We Trust" and "Tearing Into Hell". Hatchet toured for nearly two years to support the album, sharing stages with Metal Church, Flotsam and Jetsam, Helstar, Act of Defiance, Eliminate, Black Fast and Green Death. Fear Beyond Lunacy was Hatchet's final album before they switched from The End to Combat Records.

Hatchet's fourth album and Combat debut, Dying to Exist, was released on June 22, 2018. Critics described it as the band's "heaviest and most focused release to date." This was Hatchet's first album to chart in the US, peaking at number 23 on Billboard's Top Heatseekers chart. The band released the videos "Desire for Oppression", "Silent Genocide", and "Back Into Dust" to promote the album. Hatchet toured for almost two years to support Dying to Exist, playing with Kataklysm, Exhorder, Exmortus, The Absence, Krisiun, Novareign, Immortal Guardian, Black Fast and Micawber.

Hatchet released the EP Leave No Soul on October 25, 2024, through M-Theory Audio.

== Band members ==
=== Current members ===
- Julz Ramos – lead guitar (2005–present), vocals (2009–present)
- Ben Smith – drums (2014–present)
- Clayton Cagle – lead guitar (2015–present)
- Devin Reiche – bass (2017–present)

=== Former members ===
- Marcus Kirchen – vocals (?–2009)
- Eric Lundgren – vocals (2009)
- Sterling Bailey – guitar
- Jon Fryman – guitar (2010–2012)
- Clark Webb – guitar (2012–?)
- Lou Bianco – bass
- Dan Voigt – bass (?–2009)
- Ryan King – bass (2009–2010)
- Travis Russey – bass (2010–2013)
- Joey Karpowicz – bass (2013–2015)
- Kody Barba – bass (2015–2017)
- Dave Wert – drums (2005–2008)
- Alex Perez – drums (2018–2011)
- Eli Lucas – drums (2011–2014)

== Discography ==
=== Studio albums ===
- Awaiting Evil (2008)
- Dawn of the End (2013)
- Fear Beyond Lunacy (2015)
- Dying to Exist (2018)

=== EPs ===
- Hatchet (2007)
- Leave No Soul (2024)

=== Demos ===
- Frailty of the Flesh (2006)
- Frailty Demo (2007)
