= Woe to the Vanquished =

Studio album by Warbringer
- Released: March 31, 2017
- Recorded: 2016 West Valley Studios
- Genre: Thrash metal
- Length: 40:59
- Label: Napalm
- Producer: Mike Plotnikoff

Warbringer chronology
IV: Empires Collapse (2013)	Woe to the Vanquished (2017)	Weapons of Tomorrow (2020)

Professional ratings
Review scores
Source	Rating
Louder	3/5 stars
New Noise Magazine	4/5 stars

Woe to the Vanquished is the fifth studio album by the American thrash metal band Warbringer. It is the band's first album for Napalm Records, and the first to feature bassist Jessie Sanchez and lead guitarist Chase Becker. The album also marks the return of rhythm guitarist Adam Carroll, who last played on 2011's Worlds Torn Asunder.

== Production and release ==
After the departure of drummer Carlos Cruz and guitarists John Laux and Jeff Potts in the spring of 2014, Warbringer entered a period of inactivity. The band returned in 2015 with a short-lived new lineup, which was soon replaced with the returning Cruz, lead guitarist Chase Becker, and bassist Jessie Sanchez. This lineup debuted on an early 2016 tour with Exmortus and Enforcer. Following the tour the band entered West Valley Studios with producer Mike Plotnikoff to record their fifth album. The album's title and artwork were revealed in December 2016, and music videos for the songs "Silhouettes" and "Remain Violent" were released in the months leading up to the album's release.

== Track listing ==
All music by Adam Carroll, Carlos Cruz and John Kevill. All lyrics by John Kevill

No.	Title	Length
1.	"Silhouettes"	4:45
2.	"Woe to the Vanquished"	4:01
3.	"Remain Violent"	3:24
4.	"Shellfire"	3:59
5.	"Descending Blade"	4:15
6.	"Spectral Asylum"	5:34
7.	"Divinity of Flesh"	3:50
8.	"When the Guns Fell Silent"	11:11
Total length:		40:59

Japanese edition bonus tracks
No.	Title	Length
9.	"Evil Dead" (Death cover)	3:08
10.	"Arc Lite" (Coroner cover)	3:24
Total length:		47:31

== Personnel ==
Warbringer

- John Kevill – vocals
- Chase Becker – guitar
- Adam Carroll – guitar
- Jessie Sanchez – bass
- Carlos Cruz – drums, rhythm guitar (tracks 1, 4, 6, 8)

Additional personnel

- Mike Plotnikoff – production
- Howie Weinberg – mastering
- Andreas Marschall – artwork
- Joe Rickard – drum technician
- Hatch Inigaki – engineering

== Charts ==
Chart (2017)	Peak position
Belgian Albums (Ultratop Flanders)	195
