= Johnny Crowder =

American entrepreneur and musician (born 1992)

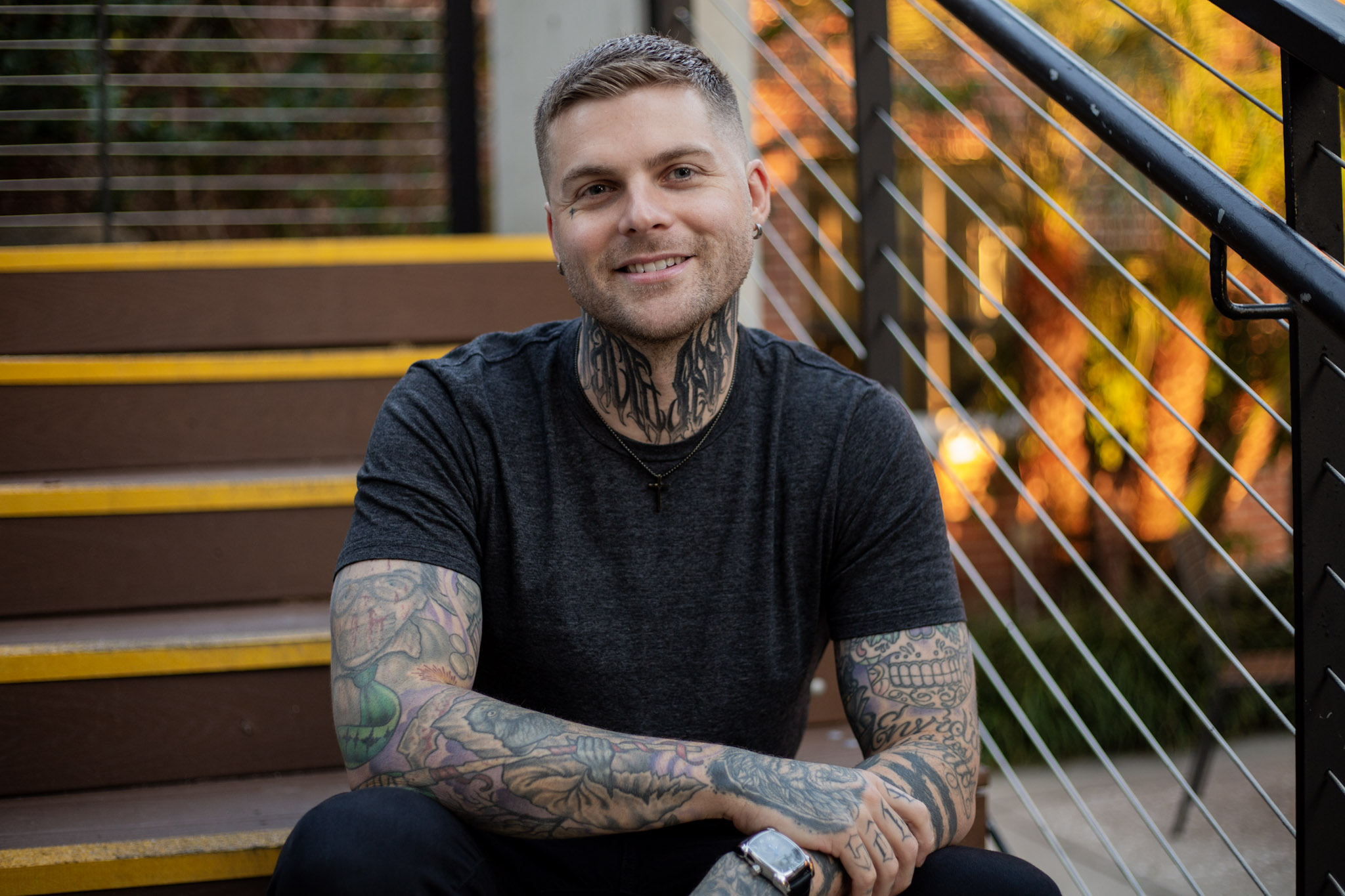
- Crowder in 2024
- Born: July 26, 1992 (age 34); Oldsmar, Florida, U.S.
- Education: University of Central Florida
- Occupations: Founder and CEO, Cope Notes
- Musical career
- Genres: Nu-metal; metalcore; death metal
- Instrument: Vocals
- Years active: 2009–present
- Member of: Prison
- Formerly of: Dark Sermon
- Website: johnnycrowder.com

Johnny Crowder (born July 26, 1992) is an American entrepreneur and musician. He is the vocalist of the band Prison and the founder of Cope Notes, a telehealth-based mental health service. Crowder is also the former vocalist of Dark Sermon.

== Early life and education ==
Crowder grew up near Oldsmar, Florida, attending Lowry Elementary, Farnell Middle and Hillsborough High schools. He then earned an associate's degree in psychology from the University of Central Florida.

== Musical career ==
In March 2009, Crowder and the other members of the band founded In Reference to a Sinking Ship in Palm Harbor, Florida. The band released their first EP in 2010, Aimless, before changing their name to Dark Sermon in 2012. Dark Sermon would be signed to multiple labels (Good Fight Entertainment, eOne Music, Nuclear Blast Records) and release two full-length albums (In Tongues, The Oracle) before the band's indefinite hiatus in 2017.

Once the group's hiatus began, Prison became Crowder's main musical project. Prison was initially formed in 2014 and is made up of former members of Dark Sermon (Crowder), Adaliah, and ABACABB/In Alcatraz 1962. Their album, Still Alive, would track on Billboard's Heatseekers and Independent Albums charts for one week each.

== Mental health advocacy and public speaking ==
Crowder became a mental health advocate in 2011, joining the National Alliance on Mental Illness as a speaker and partnering with Mental Health America. He was previously diagnosed with depression, anxiety, OCD, schizophrenia, PTSD, and bipolar disorder, later using those experiences to become a Certified Recovery Peer Specialist.

As a public speaker, Crowder tours the United States, giving keynote speeches at various organizations (like the International City/County Management Association) and other public events. He has also given keynote speeches at Shenandoah University and Elon University, including one during the latter's recognition of National Mental Illness Awareness Week in 2022. Crowder has also given two TEDx Talks, titled "How to Grow as a Person (And Why It Sucks)" and "Why I Don’t Want to Die Anymore", which was described by the Indiana Gazette as Crowder sharing "the near-death experiences that shifted his life into a new direction of purpose and hope." He is represented by various speakers bureaus, including Keppler Speakers, Washington Speakers Bureau, and Executive Speakers Bureau.

=== Cope Notes ===
In 2018, Crowder founded Cope Notes, a telehealth-based mental health service. According to the Tampa Bay Times, the company "sends subscribers positive thoughts and affirmations to help combat depression and anxiety". The company won the People's Choice award at the national Startup of the Year summit in 2022, ranking in the top 15 of the 100 semi-finalists.

== Bibliography ==
- Trauma-informed patient and public-engaged research: Development and evaluation of an online training programme (2022)
- Why I Rewired My Brain (2024)

== Discography ==
=== Dark Sermon ===
- In Tongues (2013)
- The Oracle (2015)

=== Prison ===
- Still Alive (2019)
- Live in Texas (2020)
- Splitting Black (2025)

== Collaborations ==
Year	Song	Album	Artist
2011	"Rampage" (featuring Johnny Crowder)	N/A	Reckoning
2011	"Allure" (featuring Johnny Crowder)	Rituals	Adaliah
2017	"You Are Forgiven" (featuring Johnny Crowder)	G R O W T H	Weeping Wound
2025	"Fear & Judgement" (featuring Jack Murray of 156/Silence and Johnny Crowder of Prison)	To Rid Myself Of Truth	Signs of the Swarm

== Personal life ==
Crowder is a Christian who adheres to a straight edge lifestyle, abstaining from drugs and alcohol. In 2021, he was recognized by Forbes, appearing on their "Next 1000" list. The list highlighted upcoming entrepreneurs within the United States with businesses under $10 million in funding or generated revenue.
