= Where Owls Know My Name =

2018 studio album by Rivers of Nihil

Studio album by Rivers of Nihil
- Released: March 16, 2018
- Studio: Atrium Audio
- Genres: Technical death metal, progressive death metal
- Length: 56:43
- Label: Metal Blade
- Producers: Carson Slovak, Grant McFarland

Rivers of Nihil chronology
Monarchy (2015)	Where Owls Know My Name (2018)	The Work (2021)

Singles from Where Owls Know My Name
- 1. "The Silent Life" Released: February 6, 2018; 2. "A Home" Released: February 21, 2018; 3. "Where Owls Know My Name" Released: March 7, 2018

Professional ratings
Review scores
Source	Rating
Metalinjection.net	10/10 stars
AngryMetalGuy	3/5 stars
Metal Storm	8/10 stars
Metal Hammer	4/5 stars

Where Owls Know My Name is the third studio album by American technical death metal band Rivers of Nihil. It was released on March 16, 2018 through Metal Blade Records, debuting at number 61 and selling 2,750 copies in its first week. It is the third album in the band's tetralogy based around the four seasons, representing autumn.

The album debuted on Billboard and Canadian music charts upon its release in March 2018: number 3 in the Top New Artist Albums chart (Billboard / USA), number 9 in the Current Hard Music Albums chart (Billboard / USA), number 57 in the Top 200 Current Albums chart (Billboard / USA), number 61 in the Top 200 Albums chart (Billboard / USA), number 50 in the Canadian Top 200 Chart, and number 10 in the Canadian Top Hard Music Chart.

== Lyrics ==
In a May 2018 Reddit AMA, Uttley and Biggs stated the following regarding the album's concept and lyrical content:

Owls is essentially the story of the last man on earth. He was made immortal by the planet itself (the conscious seed of light, as it were) to be the sole intelligent witness of the death of the planet. Really though this is all set dressing for the more emotional content on display here, so looking TOO closely at the lyrics for story purposes is probably a bit of a futile effort in my opinion. It's really just about loss and getting older and coping with the things you've done in your life.

== Music ==
The band announced they had returned to Atrium Audio, where they had recorded their Sophomore effort Monarchy in September 2017, via their Facebook page. The band once again worked with Grammy-nominated producers Carson Slovak and Grant McFarland, who had produced both their debut EP Hierarchy and their second studio album Monarchy.

The saxophone on the album is performed by Zach Strouse, from the band Burial In The Sky. Uttley met Strouse several years before the release of Owls while recording Strouse's local metal band. While tracking Strouse's guitar, Uttley learned that Strouse was a performance major on saxophone and attending school for saxophone. Uttley was impressed by Strouse's performance at a local university soon thereafter. The two remained close and Strouse agreed to track saxophone for what would become "Owls," first recording for "The Silent Life" at Uttley's home, to rave reviews from the other band members. As a result, Strouse provided 3 solos for the album and atmospheric work on two other songs. Uttley pointed out when interviewed that the band didn't want to be known as "the sax band" and that they were rather simply incorporating new elements into their sound. Uttley also noted that Strouse himself is a death metal fan, and that he was wearing an Origin shirt while recording his solos.

The song "Old Nothing" features a guest solo by former The Faceless guitarist and founding member of The Zenith Passage Justin McKinney. Andy Thomas of Black Crown Initiate provides additional vocals on the title track "Where Owls Know My Name." Sarah Thomas, sister of Andy Thomas, and then-girlfriend of Rivers of Nihil bassist Adam Biggs, provides additional vocals on "Subtle Change (Including the Forest of Transition and Dissatisfaction Dance)".

== Artwork ==
Album artwork was provided by Dan Seagrave, who provided artwork for the bands' two prior releases.

== Promotion ==
In promotion of the album the band released three singles: "The Silent Life," "A Home," and the title track. A music video for "A Home," produced by David Brodsky, was released on March 16.

The album was made available for streaming in its entirety on March 12 via WSOU.

== Track listing ==
All music is composed by Rivers of Nihil.

No.	Title	Length
1.	"Cancer / Moonspeak"	1:45
2.	"The Silent Life"	6:35
3.	"A Home"	5:19
4.	"Old Nothing"	4:44
5.	"Subtle Change (Including the Forest of Transition and Dissatisfaction Dance)"	8:34
6.	"Terrestria III: Wither"	3:49
7.	"Hollow"	5:14
8.	"Death Is Real"	6:09
9.	"Where Owls Know My Name"	6:43
10.	"Capricorn / Agoratopia"	7:50
Total length:		56:43

== Personnel ==
Production and performance credits are adapted from the album liner notes.

Rivers of Nihil

- Jake Dieffenbach – lead vocals
- Brody Uttley – lead guitar, acoustic guitar, keyboards, programming
- Adam Biggs – bass, backing vocals
- Jonathan Topore – rhythm guitar
- Jared Klein – drums, backing vocals

Additional musicians

- Justin McKinney – guitar solo on "Old Nothing"
- Zach Strouse – saxophone
- Grant McFarland – cello
- Sarah Thomas – vocals on "Subtle Change (Including the Forest of Transition and Dissatisfaction Dance)"
- Sean Carter – trumpet
- Andy Thomas (from Black Crown Initiate) – vocals on "Where Owls Know My Name"

Production

- Carson Slovak, Grant McFarland – producer, engineering, mixing
- Jordan Straub, Nick Shaw – additional engineering
- Alan Douches – mastering
- Dan Seagrave – artwork
