= Dark Sermon =

American blackened death metal band

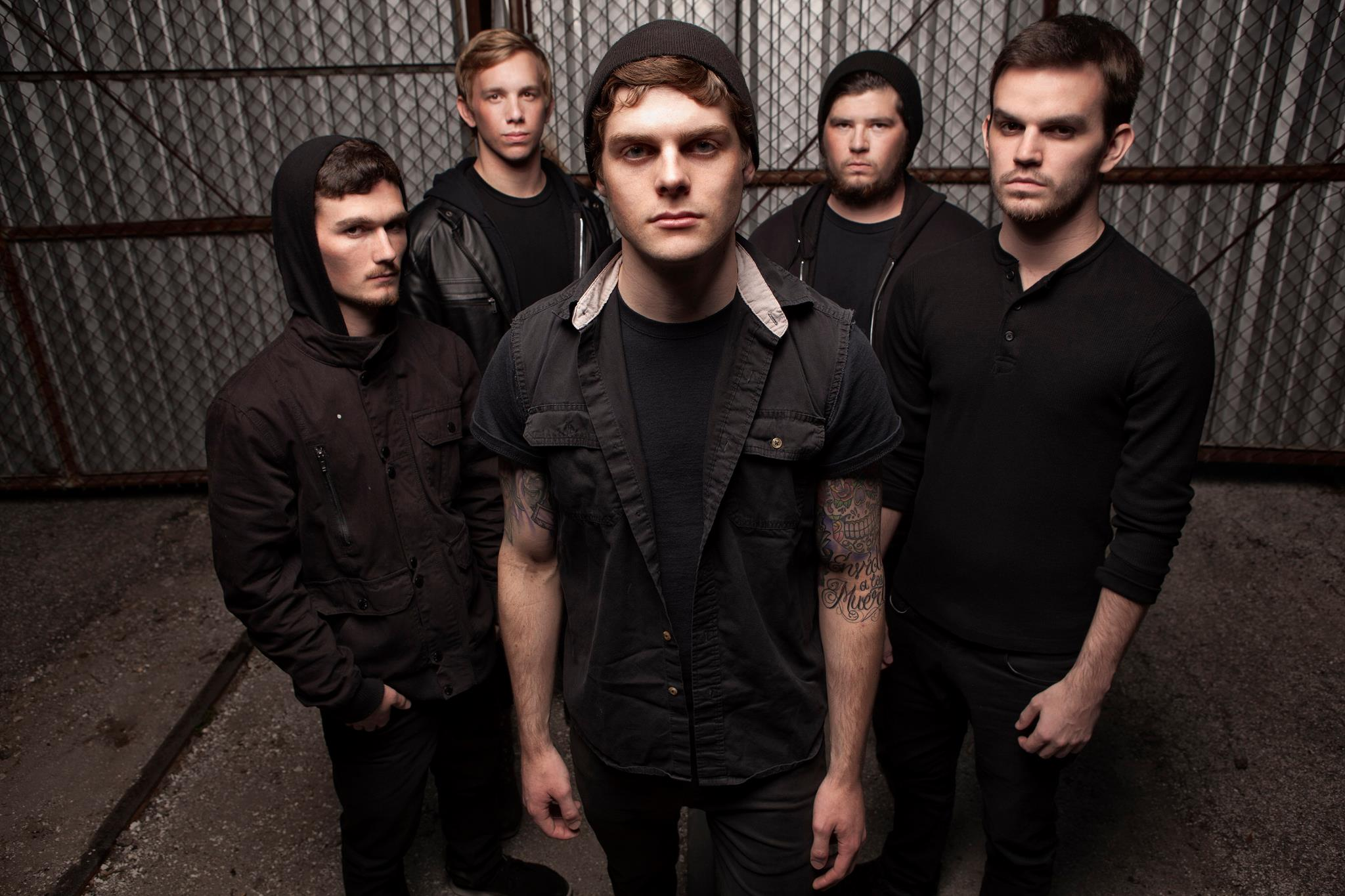
- Dark Sermon in 2012, left to right: Bryson St. Angelo (drums), Austin Good (guitar), Johnny Crowder (vocals), Austin Chandler (bass) and Neal Minor (guitar).

Background information
- Origin: Tampa, Florida
- Genres: Blackened death metal, deathcore, melodic death metal
- Years active: 2009–2017
- Labels: Good Fight Entertainment, eOne Music, Nuclear Blast Records
- Past members: Johnny Crowder; Austin Good; Neal Minor; Paul Stellmach; Jordan Jensen; Evan Miller; Bryson St. Angelo; Austin Chandler
- Website: Dark Sermon on Facebook

Dark Sermon was an American blackened death metal band from Tampa, Florida. The band was formed in 2009 under the name "In Reference to a Sinking Ship" and later changed their name to "Dark Sermon" in 2012. The band went on an indefinite hiatus in 2017.

== History ==
=== In Reference To A Sinking Ship (2009-2012) ===
Dark Sermon was formed in early 2009 in Tampa, Florida as In Reference To A Sinking Ship (IRTASS) by Austin Good, Bryson St. Angelo, Evan Miller, Austin Chandler, and Johnny Crowder. As teenagers, the band released a demo in 2009 and their first EP, Aimless, in 2010. Both were received well by many underground blogs and publications such as Duckcore, Total Deathcore, Chugcore, and thelastdisaster. As an unsigned band, they drew national attention to the Tampa scene and shared the stage with bands such as Obscura, Evergreen Terrace, Stick To Your Guns, Norma Jean, and Shai Hulud, as well as playing the 2010 editions of the Summer Slaughter Tour and Vans Warped Tour. This immediate success in the Tampa metal scene led them to their first tours in early 2012 with King Conquer, Forty Winters, and Abiotic.

=== Name Change, Signing to eOne Music/Nuclear Blast, In Tongues (2012-2013) ===
The band changed its name to Dark Sermon in 2012. In an online interview, vocalist Johnny Crowder discussed the band's reasoning for a name change: "There are a lot of reasons why we changed our name. A six-word band name is too much. It's hard to remember, and I feel like people weren't taking us as seriously as they should. Our music and our name didn't match. People would see our name and scoff, but then we'd play and then they'd say, 'Oh, why is that band called that?' I feel like our new name represents our sound much better."

Following their name change, the band toured for the first time as Dark Sermon for several tours with King Conquer, The World We Knew, Sirens and Sailors, and Abiotic. Music videos were shot for two upcoming singles, "In Tongues" and "Hounds", that would eventually make their way onto their debut album. On November 12, 2012, Dark Sermon announced that they had signed a worldwide deal with eOne Music and would be releasing their new album the following year. The band ended that year with a last-minute slot to play Barge to Hell, an extreme metal boat cruise, from December 3–7, 2012, playing with bands such as At The Gates, Exodus, Sepultura, Vital Remains, Soilwork, and more.

The band announced that their debut album In Tongues would be released on March 26, 2013, through eOne Music in North America. They also signed a deal with Nuclear Blast Records to release their record through Europe on April 12, 2013. The band released the first new single off of their upcoming album, "Imperfect Contrition" on March 5, 2013. The band toured throughout North America in 2013, including their first visits to Canada in March 2013.

=== The Oracle (2014-2017) ===
In 2014, the band announced a U.S. headlining tour as well as the news of a brand new single. They released "Starve," the first single from their to-be-released second album on June 18, 2014. Following this tour, the band took some time off to work on the new album. This was followed by a fall tour with Suffokate, Reformers, Blood of the Martyrs, and Colossus. The band continued to complete their new album for the next few months and it was slated for a 2015 release.

Dark Sermon was later announced as a last-minute addition to 70000 Tons of Metal from January 22–26, 2015; a four-day cruise with over 60 bands which featured acts such as Cannibal Corpse, Napalm Death, Venom, Behemoth, and Arch Enemy. This was followed by a couple of announcements for back-to-back tours with Sworn Enemy / Wretched and Aborted / Fit For An Autopsy / Archspire. On May 28, it was announced by the band that their new album, The Oracle, would be released on August 21, 2015, through eOne Music.

The band toured and released several singles in support of The Oracle. The first music video off of the album was filmed for the single "Rat King" and was released on September 8, 2015. Dark Sermon spent the fall on tour supporting Cattle Decapitation throughout North America and released a second music video for the song "The Eyeless Needle."

Following the release of The Oracle, Dark Sermon's touring cycle continued throughout North America well into 2016 in support of major metal acts like Thy Art Is Murder, Rings of Saturn, and Rivers of Nihil. This cycle also included a full US headlining tour with support from Canadian hardcore band Exalt.

In 2017, vocalist Johnny Crowder announced that Dark Sermon would go on hiatus indefinitely due to the fulfillment of their contracts with eOne and Nuclear Blast along with multiple members retiring from touring altogether. At the same time as the announcement, Crowder formed a new band, Prison.

== Tours ==
=== 2012 ===
- East Coast tour from February 1 to February 19 with Forty Winters and A Fight For Life. (as IRTASS)
- Shredded to Pieces tour from April 15 to April 22 with King Conquer, Abiotic and Forty Winters. (as IRTASS)
- Brief run from August 5 to August 11 with The World We Knew and Sirens and Sailors.

=== 2013 ===
- The World We Knew farewell tour from February 9 to March 3 with Aegaeon.
- Metalfest Invasion Tour from April 12 to April 27 with Abiotic.
- Crown of Phantoms North American tour from July 26 to August 25 with Chimaira, The Browning and Threat Signal.

=== 2014 ===
- Headlining tour from June 1 to June 25 with Kingmaker, Villains (Yüth Forever), and Widow (Darke Complex).
- The Thrill of the Kill tour from September 6 to September 19 with Suffokate, Colossus and Reformers.

=== 2015 ===
- No Mercy No Surrender tour from April 7 to May 1 with Sworn Enemy, Wretched and Hammerfight.
- Spring tour from May 8 to June 7 with Aborted, Fit For An Autopsy, and Archspire.
- The North American Extinction tour from September 15 to October 7 with Cattle Decapitation, King Parrot, and Black Crown Initiate.

=== 2016 ===
- Winter tour from February 17 to March 6 with Rivers of Nihil and Black Fast.
- The Coffin Dragger tour from April 6 to May 20 with Thy Art is Murder, Fit For An Autopsy and Rings of Saturn.

== Members ==
Final lineup

- Austin Good – guitars (2009–2017)
- Neal Minor – guitars (2011–2017)
- Jordan Jensen – drums (2013–2017)
- Paul Stellmach– bass guitar (2013–2017)
- Johnny Crowder – vocals (2009–2017)

Former members

- Austin Chandler– bass (2009–2013)
- Bryson St. Angelo – drums (2009–2013)
- Evan Miller – guitars (2009–2011)

== Discography ==
Albums

- In Tongues (eOne Music 2013)
- The Oracle (eOne Music 2015)

EPs

- Aimless (as In Reference To a Sinking Ship, 2010)

== Videography ==
Title	Year	Director	Album
"In Tongues"	2012	Jeffrey Moore	In Tongues
"Hounds"	2013	Kevin J. Custer	In Tongues
"Rat King"	2015	Joey Durango	The Oracle
"The Eyeless Needle"	2015	Joey Durango	The Oracle
