= Rivers of Nihil (album) =

Studio album by Rivers of Nihil
- Released: May 30, 2025
- Recorded: March 2023 - April 2024
- Studio: Atrium Audio
- Genre: Progressive death metal
- Label: Metal Blade
- Producers: Carson Slovak; Grant McFarland

Rivers of Nihil chronology
The Work (2021)	Rivers of Nihil (2025)

Singles from Rivers of Nihil
- 1. "The Sub-Orbital Blues" Released: June 15, 2023; 2. "Criminals" Released: April 29, 2024; 3. "House of Light" Released: February 6, 2025; 4. "American Death" Released: March 12, 2025; 5. "Water & Time" Released: April 17, 2025

Professional ratings
Review scores
Source	Rating
Blabbermouth	9/10 stars

Rivers of Nihil is the fifth studio album by American technical death metal band Rivers of Nihil. The album was released on May 30, 2025 via Metal Blade Records. It is the band's first album without founding member and vocalist Jake Dieffenbach, and the first to feature Andy Thomas. Commercially, the album is the band's most successful to date, debuting on multiple charts, debuting at #2 position on the Current Hard Music Albums chart, #7 on the Current Rock Albums chart, #7 on the Independent Label Albums chart.

== Background ==
In April 2022, the band announced that guitarist Jonathan Topore would be leaving the band, and that Black Crown Initiate guitarist Andy Thomas would be replacing him.

In October 2022, the band announced that they had parted ways with founding member and vocalist Jake Dieffenbach, and that Adam Biggs would be handling vocal duties on upcoming tours.

In March 2023, the band announced via social media that they were in the studio recording their fifth full-length album.

On June 15, 2023, the band released its first piece of new music featuring their new members, "The Sub Orbital Blues," with an accompanying music video. The single was engineered, mixed, and mastered by Carson Slovak and Grant McFarland of Atrium Audio, with additional engineering by guitarist Brody Uttley. The band entered the studio again in April 2024 to record additional material. On April 29, the band released the single "Criminals" with an accompanying music video. The single was recorded during their March 2023 recording session.

In February 2025, the band shared that their self-titled fifth LP would be released on May 30, and that the album's first single, "House of Light" would debut on February 6. On March 12, the band debuted the single "American Death" with an accompanying music video, and on April 17 the band debuted the single "Water & Time" with an accompanying video. The band shared a guitar play-through of the track "Dustman" on June 10.

== Critical reception ==
Rivers of Nihil was the band's highest-debuting album to date, appearing on a number of charts and recording over 2.8 million streams on Spotify in its first week. It was elected by Loudwire as one of the 11 best progressive metal albums of 2025.

== Track listing ==
All lyrics are written by Adam Biggs; all music is composed by Brody Uttley, with additional co-writers listed.

No.	Title	Music	Length
1.	"The Sub-Orbital Blues"	Biggs; Andy Thomas	4:18
2.	"Dustman"		4:33
3.	"Criminals"	Thomas	4:32
4.	"Despair Church"	Thomas	6:30
5.	"Water & Time"		5:24
6.	"House of Light"	Thomas	5:49
7.	"Evidence"		4:22
8.	"American Death"		5:23
9.	"The Logical End"		6:07
10.	"Rivers of Nihil"		3:16

== Charts ==
U.S. Billboard Charts
Chart	Position
Current Hard Music Albums	2
Current Rock Albums	7
Independent Label Albums	7
Current Digital Albums	9
Current Album Sales	23

Canada Billboard Charts
Chart	Position
Hard Music Albums	1
Current Digital Albums	7
Top Current Albums	8
LP Vinyl Sales	23

Europe
Chart	Position
Official Top 100 Albums DE weekly	60
Official Top 100 Albums Downloaded DE weekly	21
Official Top 100 Albums Midweek DE weekly	22
iTunes Top 10 Albums AT daily	9
iTunes Top 100 Albums DE daily	33
Official Top 100 Albums CH weekly	87
Official Top 20 Rock/Metal Albums DE weekly	12
Official Top 75 Albums AT weekly	44

== Personnel ==
Rivers of Nihil

- Adam Biggs – vocals, bass
- Andy Thomas – guitar, vocals
- Brody Uttley – guitar, piano, keyboards, programming, additional mixing, additional engineering
- Jared Klein – drums, vocals

Additional personnel

- Patrick Corona – alto saxophone (1, 4, 5, 6, 9)
- Stephan Lopez – banjo (3, 10), backing vocals (7)
- Grant McFarland – cello (4, 6)
- Ben Umanov, Brian Miler, Mike Manley, Nick Shaw – backing vocals (7)
- Dan Seagrave – cover art
- Carson Slovak, Grant McFarland – recording, engineering, mixing, production, mastering
- Nick Loiacono – additional engineering
