= The Work (Rivers of Nihil album) =

Studio album by Rivers of Nihil
- Released: September 24, 2021
- Studio: Atrium Audio, Lititz, Pennsylvania
- Genre: Progressive death metal, progressive rock
- Length: 64:23
- Label: Metal Blade
- Producer: Carson Slovak, Grant McFarland

Rivers of Nihil chronology
| Where Owls Know My Name (2018) | The Work (2021) | Rivers of Nihil (2025) |

Singles from The Work
- 1. "Clean" Released: July 27, 2021; 2. "Focus" Released: August 24, 2021

Professional ratings
Review scores
| Source | Rating |
|---|---|
| AngryMetalGuy | 3/5 stars |
| Blabbermouth | 8.5/10 stars |
| Metalinjection.net | 9/10 stars |
| Metal Storm | 8/10 |

The Work is the fourth studio album by American progressive death metal band Rivers of Nihil. The album was released on September 24, 2021 via Metal Blade Records. It is the fourth and last album in the band's tetralogy based around the four seasons; it represents winter. It was elected by Loudwire as the 22nd best rock/metal album of 2021. It is also the last album to feature lead vocalist Jake Dieffenbach and rhythm guitarist Jon Topore before their departures in 2022.

== Background and album synopsis ==
Following the release of Where Owls Know My Name, Rivers of Nihil experienced an upward trajectory in their career; the album charted 61st on the Billboard 200, which allowed the band members to commit to the band full time. However, early 2020 the COVID-19 pandemic hit, which, combined with the new expectations of following up a successful album, took a toll on the band's mental health, which in turn was reflected in the material which, in Biggs' words, "definitely got a little hopeless".

While Biggs originally planned to call the album "Static Gray", during the tour cycle for Owls he began to reframe the album around the concept of work, both as the band's new day job, but also the "emotional, financial, creative" effort that someone must make in society. The songs "The Void From Which No Sound Escapes" and "MORE?" revolve around the demands and expectations of the band's audience, while "Focus" explores Biggs' experience of having prescribed amphetamines as a child, and the psychological addiction that develops.

Musically, Uttley aimed for the album to have a number of recurring motifs; the opening track "The Tower" was inspired by Trent Reznor's piano work. The album features a number of Uttley's field recordings from around Reading; the recordings include trains and industrial equipment, some audible on their own, while others were edited into drum loops. The album also features sporadic use of analog synthesizers.

== Track listing ==
| No. | Title | Length |
|---|---|---|
| 1. | "The Tower (theme from 'The Work')" | 4:30 |
| 2. | "Dreaming Black Clockwork" | 6:39 |
| 3. | "Wait" | 4:05 |
| 4. | "Focus" | 4:54 |
| 5. | "Clean" | 6:08 |
| 6. | "The Void from Which No Sound Escapes" | 6:43 |
| 7. | "MORE?" | 3:25 |
| 8. | "Tower 2" | 1:58 |
| 9. | "Episode" | 7:29 |
| 10. | "Maybe One Day" | 7:03 |
| 11. | "Terrestria IV: Work" | 11:29 |
| Total length: | | 64:23 |

== Personnel ==
Rivers of Nihil

- Jake Dieffenbach – lead vocals
- Brody Uttley – lead guitar, acoustic guitar, keyboards, programming
- Adam Biggs – bass, backing vocals
- Jonathan Topore – rhythm guitar
- Jared Klein – drums, backing vocals

Additional musicians

- Zach Strouse – saxophone
- Grant McFarland – cello on "The Void From Which No Sound Escapes"
- James Dorton – vocals on "Episode" and "Terrestria IV: Work"
- Stephan Lopez – vocals

Personnel

- Dan Seagrave – cover art
