= War Without End =

War Without End may refer to:

- "War Without End" (Babylon 5), an episode of the American science fiction television series Babylon 5
- "War Without End" (Iron Fist)
- War Without End (album), a 2008 release by the American thrash metal band Warbringer
- War Without End, a collection of short stories in The Horus Heresy series
