= Violent Portraits of Doomed Escape =

Studio album by Black Crown Initiate
- Released: August 7, 2020
- Recorded: December 2–20, 2019
- Studio: Think Loud Studios
- Genre: Technical death metal
- Length: 50:00
- Label: Century Media
- Producer: Carson Slovak, Grant McFarland

Black Crown Initiate chronology
| Selves We Cannot Forgive (2016) | Violent Portraits of Doomed Escape (2020) |

Singles from Violent Portraits of Doomed Escape
- 1. "Years in Frigid Light" Released: September 20, 2019; 2. "Invitation" Released: March 13, 2020; 3. "Sun of War" Released: June 5, 2020; 4. "Death Comes in Reverse" Released: July 24, 2020

Professional ratings
Review scores
| Source | Rating |
|---|---|
| Angry Metal Guy | (3.5/5) |
| Distorted Sound Magazine | (10/10) |
| Blabbermouth.net | (8.5/10) |
| Tuonel Magazine | (9/10) |
| Ghost Cult Magazine | (9/10) |

Violent Portraits of Doomed Escape is the third full-length album from American extreme metal band Black Crown Initiate. The album was released on August 7, 2020. It was produced by Carson Slovak and Grant McFarland, with cover art by Schon Wanner. The album sold 1,075 copies in its first week, debuting at No. 85 on the Billboard Top Album Sales chart. The album's subject matter was conceived during a "dark period" in lyricist and guitarist Andy Thomas' life. Thomas called the album's theme "a bookmark on thirty three years of my life," and realizing "you can go through whatever you want but you're still accountable to yourself."

== Background ==
In late 2016, the band entered somewhat of a hiatus as they dealt with complications related to representation, personal issues, and departing band members. In December 2018, the band announced the departure of guitarist Wes Hauch, and drummer Jesse Beahler. Additionally, the band announced that guitarist Ethan McKenna and drummer Samuel Santiago would be joining the band. In December 2019, the band recruited drummer Gabe Seeber(who left in the same year) to work on their new album. In July 2019, the band signed for Century Media Records, and hinted at new music in the near future.

On September 20, 2019, the band released its first new music in three years with the single "Years in Frigid Light." In November 2019, the band announced it was entering the studio to begin work on a new album, with tracking set to commence in "a couple weeks." On March 10, 2019, the band officially announced they'd completed work on the coming album titled "Violent Portraits of Doomed Escape," with a single titled "Invitation" slated to drop the following Friday. In July 2020, a music video was produced for the song "Holy Silence," directed by David Brodsky, with illustrations by Chris Bishop.

After the release of the album, in 2022 Andy Thomas and Nick Shaw would depart within a day of each other. Thomas would ultimately join Rivers of Nihil, citing the reason for his departure from Black Crown Initiate as difficulty working with a "revolving door" of musicians. but both returned in 2024.

== Track listing ==
| No. | Title | Length |
|---|---|---|
| 1. | "Invitation" | 7:55 |
| 2. | "Son of War" | 4:03 |
| 3. | "Trauma Bonds" | 6:03 |
| 4. | "Years in Frigid Light" | 6:43 |
| 5. | "Bellow" | 2:14 |
| 6. | "Death Comes in Reverse" | 5:45 |
| 7. | "Sun of War" | 7:14 |
| 8. | "Holy Silence" | 7:47 |
| 9. | "He Is the Path" | 2:19 |
| Total length: | | 50:00 |

== Personnel ==
Black Crown Initiate

- James Dorton – vocals
- Andy Thomas – guitars, clean vocals
- Ethan McKenna – guitars
- Nick Shaw – bass
- Gabe Seeber – drums

Production and staff

- Carson James Slovak, Grant McFarland – production, mixing, mastering
- Schon Wanner – artwork
- Alex Hofmann – layout
- Tyler Katsigiannis, Olivia Place – photography
