= Warbringer =

American thrash metal band

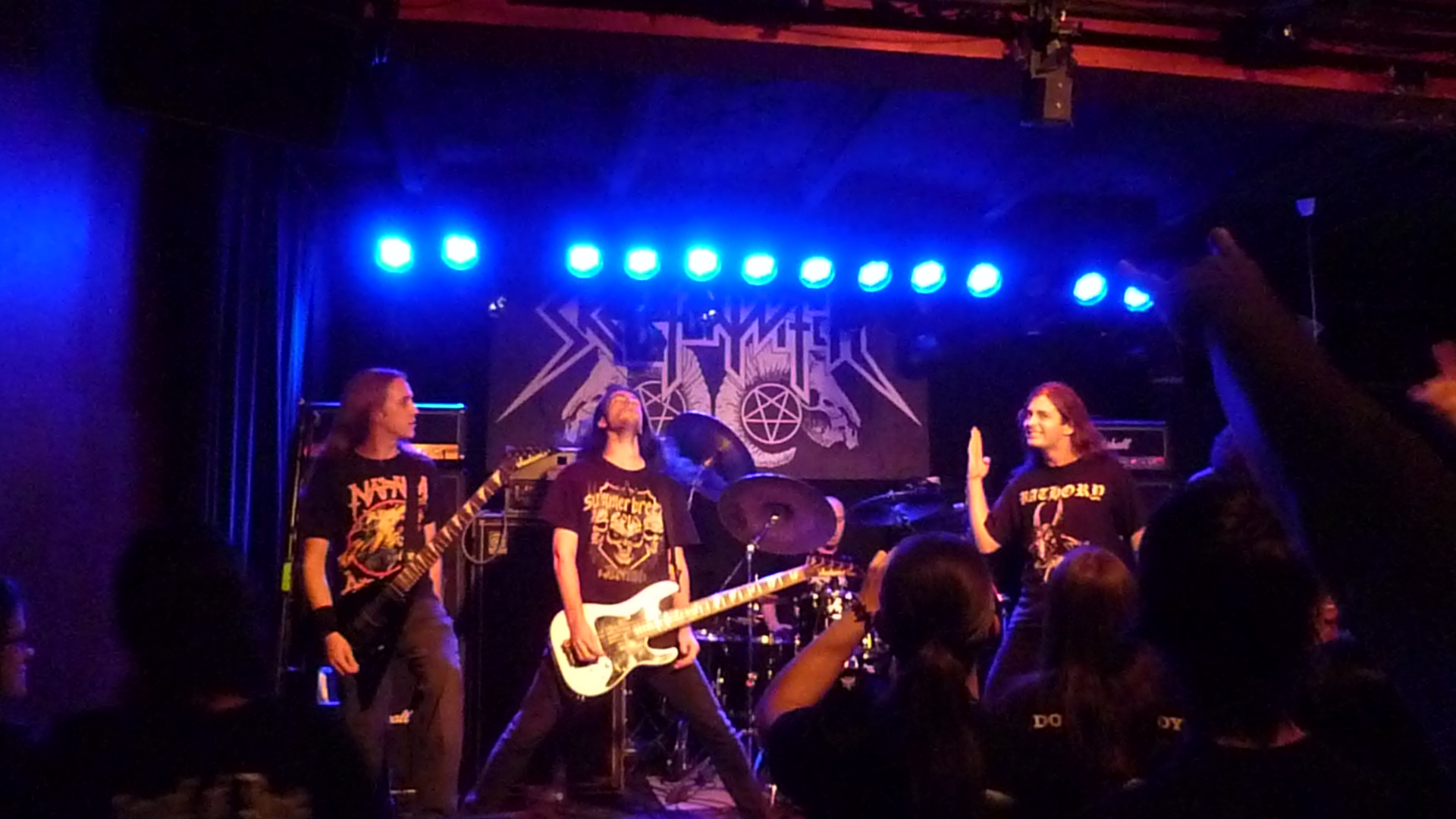
- Warbringer performing in 2010

Background information
- Origin: Newbury Park, California, U.S.
- Genre: Thrash metal
- Years active: 2004–present
- Label: Napalm
- Members: John Kevill; Adam Carroll; Carlos Cruz; Chase Becker; Chase Bryant
- Past members: Evan Reiter; Ryan Bates; Alex Malmquist; Rob Thrasher; Ellie Hoschet; Ben Bennett; Nic Ritter; Jeff Potts; Andy Laux; Ben Mottsman; John Laux; Jessie Sanchez
- Website: warbringermusic.com

Warbringer is an American thrash metal band formed in 2004. Century Media Records signed Warbringer after a label executive saw them at a show in LA. Warbringer's second album, Waking into Nightmares, was released on May 19, 2009. The album reached No. 14 on the Billboard Heatseekers chart. Through several line-up changes, Warbringer has released seven full-length studio albums. Along with Bonded by Blood, Evile, Hatchet and Havok, they are notable as part of the late 2000s-early 2010s "thrash metal revival".

== History ==
=== Formation and early releases (2004–2007) ===
The band formed in 2004, when John Laux and Victor Mikhaltsevich met in high school. They shared an interest in heavy metal, and began writing instrumental songs. Eventually, Mikhaltsevich introduced John Kevill to Laux as their new vocalist, and they established a creative partnership. They had named the band Onslaught but changed it after realizing that there was a band using the same name. Nothing had been recorded and released while they had used the name. They recruited bassist Andy Laux and drummer Evan Reiter. A few weeks later, Reiter was replaced with Adam Carroll, whom Kevill had met as a guitarist in a local band at a Metal Church show.

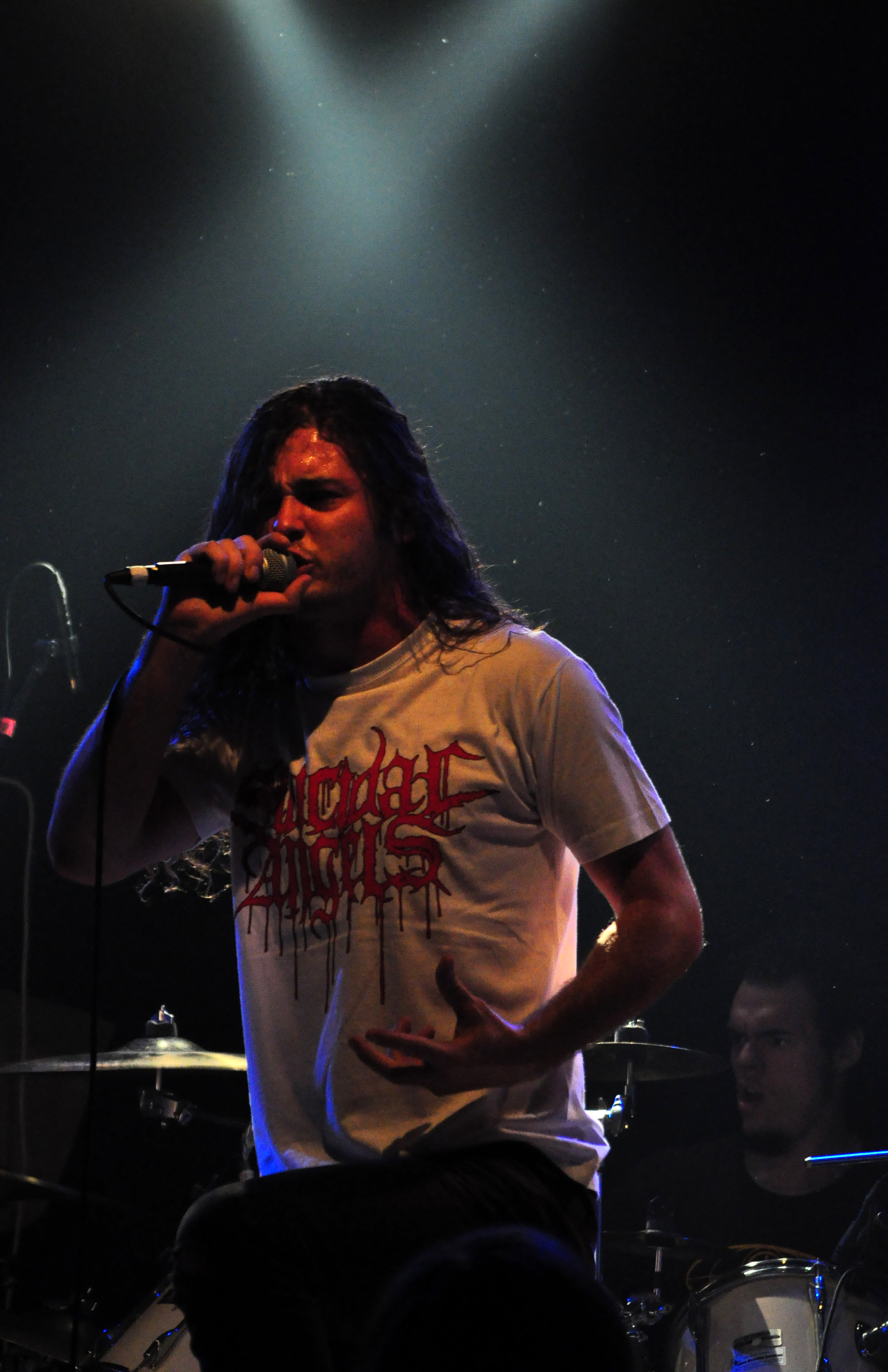
John Kevill (2012)

The new lineup adopted the name Warbringer after combining "War" with a variety of other words. They recorded a four-song demo in 2004 that was never released. It is the only recording with Victor Mikhaltsevich in the band. Due to creative differences the band decided to seek out another guitar player. Ellie Hoschet soon joined the band, and in 2005 they self-financed the Born of the Ruins demo. Copies were handmade and passed out for free at local shows.

A local thrash revival scene started expanding and growing around the L.A. area. Thanks to word of mouth, organic promotion, and social networking sites, a lot of young promoters began booking shows with exclusively traditional metal bands. Eventually bands in the scene were playing sold-out shows on the Sunset Strip. Smaller labels became interested in the scene and Heavy Artillery Records had asked a number of upcoming thrash bands to contribute to a various artist compilation Speed Kills...Again. The release was delayed until 2007.

Ryan Bates joined Warbringer early in 2006 as the band's new drummer after Adam Carroll had left on a hiatus from Warbringer and Zombie.

In 2006 the band also finished the One By One, the Wicked Fall demo which was self-financed and recorded at Love Juice Labs. The original pressings were handmade, but the band eventually opted to have them printed more professionally. The EP was sent out to a number of different labels and magazines. The EP was very successful and was met with many positive reviews. Warbringer began to move up in the local roster and open for larger bands. Ellie Hoschet parted ways with the band early in 2007, and brought in former member Adam Carroll as a temporary guitarist. The band opened shows for bands like Obituary, Atheist and Repulsion.

In 2007 Warbringer signed with Century Media. Adam Carroll decided to rejoin Warbringer full-time and made contributions to the music on War Without End as a drummer and guitarist.

=== War Without End and Waking into Nightmares (2007–2009) ===
Warbringer entered the studio with Bill Metoyer (Slayer, D.R.I., W.A.S.P) as their producer and engineer. In 2008 War Without End was released and Warbringer was lined up for their first national tour opening for Exodus in January followed by another stateside tour opening for Nile. Andy Laux decided to finish his senior year of high school before touring with the band and asked Ben Bennett to fill in on bass duties until he graduated.

The following June after a tour in Europe with Napalm Death and Suffocation, Ryan Bates informed the band that he was not satisfied touring and would be leaving them to pursue other ambitions. The band issue a press release seeking a new drummer through YouTube auditions.

Nic Ritter joined the band shortly after Ryan's departure while still an active member of the progressive metal outfit Prototype. That summer Warbringer traveled to Europe performing at a number festival dates including Wacken Open Air and resumed a heavy touring schedule starting with Sworn Enemy. The band returned to the States and toured there in the fall with Finntroll followed by Overkill.

During the winter of 2008 Warbringer began writing new music, with less than 3 months to write the record, the band was unfazed by the pressure and with experience from the road, writing partnerships between the band were stronger and more focused than anytime before in the career.

Early in 2009 the band went to Sharkbite Studios in Oakland, California to record with Gary Holt (Exodus) as producer and Zack Ohren for mixing and mastering. The record was completed in 12 days and the band went on two more North American tours with Soilwork back to back with Kreator and Exodus. The tour lasted over 3½ months. During the last half of the tour, Nic Ritter broke his arm and John Gensmer of Epicurean filled in for the band.

In July Warbringer embarked on a headlining tour of Europe and as support for Onslaught and Testament in the UK. This was Ben Bennett's last tour and in August he was replaced by the band's original bass player, Andy Laux. The band continued touring heavily in the US, opening for Obituary, Vader, and a show with Slipknot before the end of the year.

=== Worlds Torn Asunder and IV: Empires Collapse (2010–2016) ===
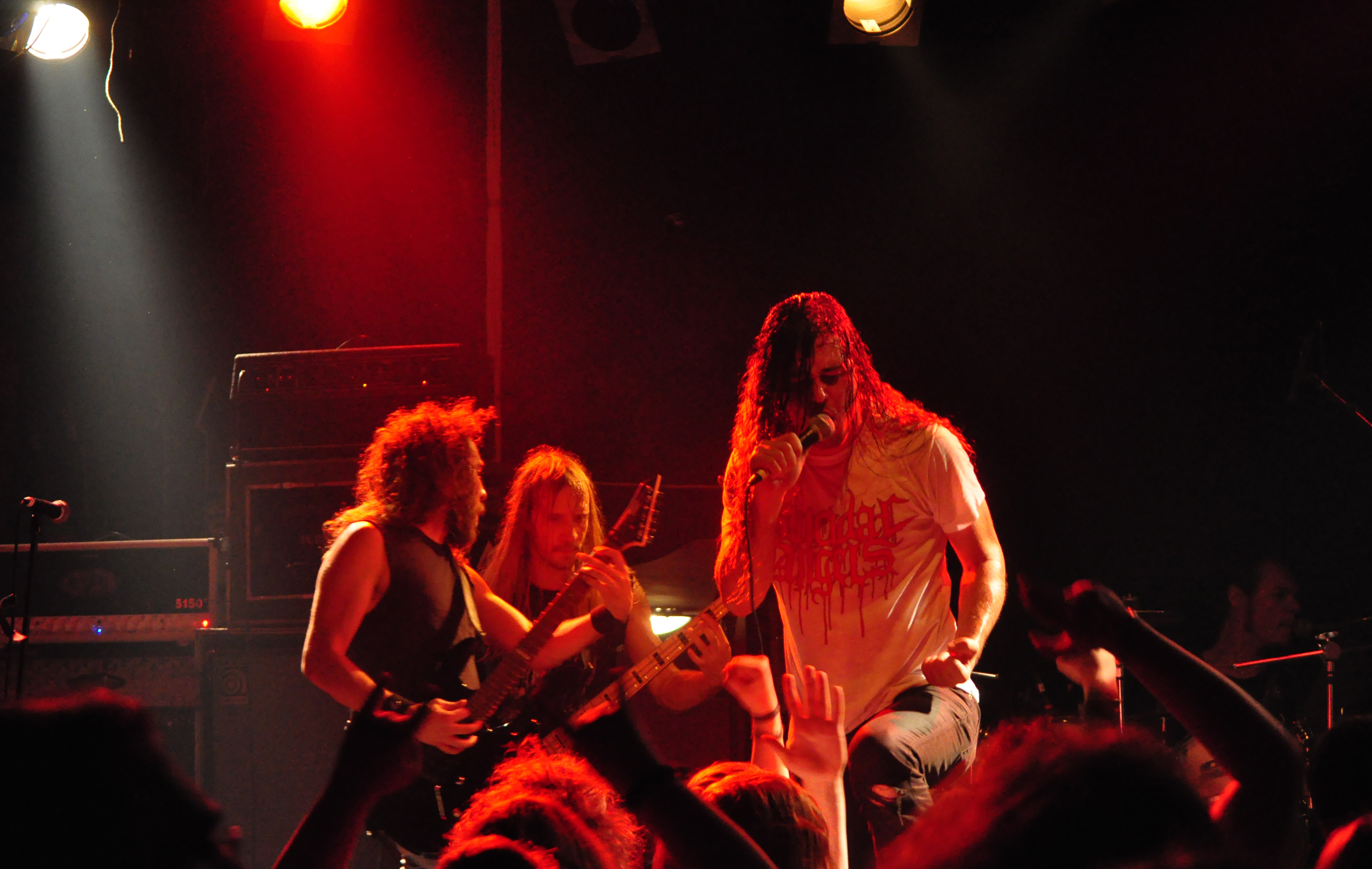
Warbringer in Rostock, Germany in 2012

In 2010 Warbringer returned to a Europe/UK tour, co-heading with the U.K.'s Evile and the Israeli The Fading. Later, Warbringer and Evile returned to the States to support Overkill's Killfest 2010 tour. In the spring Warbringer opened for Municipal Waste in Japan and headlined in Thailand, Indonesia, Singapore, Malaysia, and The Philippines. Warbringer was direct support for Pestilence in North America, then returned to Europe to co-headline with Skeletonwitch, and then as direct support again in the fall supporting Nevermore.

The band made plans to begin work for the third record. Due to overwhelming personal tensions from touring the band went on a short hiatus. They reach a mutual decision with drummer Nic Ritter and parted ways after a handful of shows early in 2011. Carlos Cruz of Hexen was announced as the band's next drummer shortly afterwards. They played at Wacken Open Air in August 2012. Cruz would need to leave Warbringer in 2014 for personal reasons, but returned in late 2015.

During the spring of 2011 Warbringer entered The Omen Room studios with producer Steve Evetts (Sepultura, The Dillinger Escape Plan, M.O.D.) to complete Worlds Torn Asunder

In 2011 Warbringer began a tour with Diamond Plate, Lazarus A.D., and Landmine Marathon

In early 2012 the band went on the road as the supporting act for Symphony X and Iced Earth.

The band released their fourth album IV: Empires Collapse on October 15, 2013. This was followed by tour dates with Kreator and Overkill.

On May 12, 2014, vocalist John Kevill announced that drummer Carlos Cruz and founding guitarist John Laux had left the band, leaving the future of the band uncertain. Four days later, it was announced that the band would continue, and announced they are searching for a new drummer.

On March 5, 2014, vocalist John Kevill announced the following: "I remember on the last show we played on that U.S. tour (guitarist) Adam Carroll came to me and told me how we had to keep the torch held high and to realize the full potential of the band no matter what. We carried on the following European tour with fill-in members, as we really hate to cancel a gig and let down our fans, but it really seemed like the end for us. Fortunately, though it took a long time, we have been able to find musicians in our area to help carry on the torch of the destructive, intense music this band stands for."

Sometime after the summer of 2015 Carlos Cruz rejoined the band after the band's former touring line-up who just joined the band in 2014 quit. John Kevill said in an interview in February 2016 that Cruz had rediscovered the hunger to play music.

=== Woe to the Vanquished, Weapons of Tomorrow and Wrath and Ruin (2016–present) ===
In late August 2016, John Kevill confirmed the band was in the second week of recording their fifth studio album. He also stated there would be 8 songs on the album, and an 11-minute epic. He described the first half of the album as "probably the most fast and brutal side A of any Warbringer record yet" and the second half as "more progressive/darkly melodic."

On December 13, 2016, it was announced that Warbringer's fifth studio album Woe to the Vanquished would be released on March 31, 2017. The band toured worldwide in support of the album, opening for Death Angel on their Evil Divide tour in Europe, and playing the 2018 edition of Thrash Domination in Japan with Testament and Exodus.

Warbringer released the single "Power Unsurpassed" digitally on August 17, 2018, and on vinyl a week later, August 24. By that point, the band had begun writing new material for their sixth studio album. On September 25, 2019, Warbringer digitally released "Firepower Kills" as the lead single from their then-upcoming sixth album, which was due for release in February 2020. In a December 2019 interview on Full Metal Jackie, Kevill confirmed that the album was "done and recorded." On February 28, 2020, it was announced that the album was titled Weapons of Tomorrow and would be released on April 24. The band was supposed to embark on a co-headlining European tour with Nervosa in early 2022, but it was announced in November 2021 that they were forced to withdraw from the tour, due to medical issues, and also confirmed that they had begun writing new material for their seventh studio album.

Warbringer's seventh studio album, Wrath and Ruin, was released on March 14, 2025. The band will tour in promotion of the album, which will include co-headlining a North American tour with Allegaeon, and supporting Kreator in Europe on the latter's Demonic Summer tour.

== Members ==
Current members

- John Kevill – lead vocals (2004–present)
- Adam Carroll – rhythm guitar, backing vocals (2007–2012, 2013–present), drums (2004–2006)
- Carlos Cruz – drums (2011–2014, 2015–present)
- Chase Becker – lead guitar, backing vocals (2016–present)
- Chase Bryant – bass (2018–present)

Live members

- John Gensmer – drums (2009)
- Elad Manor – bass (2010)
- Blake Anderson – drums (2014, 2025)
- Balmore Lemus – lead guitar (2014, 2024)
- Jadran "Conan" Gonzalez – lead guitar (2016, 2024)

Former members

- John Laux – lead guitar (2004–2014)
- Andy Laux – bass (2004–2008, 2009–2012)
- Ryan Bates – drums (2004–2008)
- Nic Ritter – drums (2008–2011; died 2017)
- Ben Bennett – bass (2008–2009)
- Ben Mottsman – bass (2012–2014)
- Andrew Bennett – rhythm guitar (2012)
- Jeff Potts – rhythm guitar (2012–2013)
- Noah Young – lead guitar (2014–2015)
- Alex Malmquist – bass (2014–2015)
- Vicken Hovsepian – drums (2014–2015)
- Jessie Sanchez – bass (2016–2018)

== Discography ==
=== Studio albums ===
- War Without End (2008)
- Waking into Nightmares (2009)
- Worlds Torn Asunder (2011)
- IV: Empires Collapse (2013)
- Woe to the Vanquished (2017)
- Weapons of Tomorrow (2020)
- Wrath and Ruin (2025)

=== EPs ===
- One By One, the Wicked Fall (2006)

=== Singles ===
- Limited Edition Rough Mix Tracks (2009)
- Living Weapon (2011)
- Silhouettes (2017)
- Remain Violent (2017)
- Power Unsurpassed (2018)
- Firepower Kills (2019)
- The Black Hand Reaches Out (2020)
- Glorious End (2020)

=== Demos ===
- Born of the Ruins (2005)

=== Splits ===
- Imperial Anthems No.2 (2010)

=== Compilation contributions ===
- Thrashing Like a Maniac (2007)

== Videography ==
- Combat Shock (2008)
- At the Crack of Doom (2008)
- Severed Reality (2009)
- Shattered Like Glass (2011)
- Black Sun, Black Moon (2013)
- Silhouettes (2017)
- Remain Violent (2017)
- The Black Hand Reaches Out (2020)
- Crushed Beneath The Tracks (2022)
- Unraveling (2023)
- A Better World (2025)
