= The Wreckage of Stars =

Studio album by Black Crown Initiate
- Released: September 30, 2014
- Studio: Atrium Audio
- Genre: Technical death metal
- Length: 52:45
- Label: eOne
- Producer: Carson Slovak

Black Crown Initiate chronology
Song of the Crippled Bull (2013)	The Wreckage of Stars (2014)	Selves We Cannot Forgive (2016)

Professional ratings
Review scores
Source	Rating
Sputnik Music	(4/5)
Revolver Magazine	(3/5)
The Circle Pit	(9.5/10)

The Wreckage of Stars is the debut full length record from American extreme metal band Black Crown Initiate. The album was released on September 30, 2014 through eOne Music and was produced by Carson Slovak (August Burns Red, Texas In July, Everclear). Music videos were filmed for the tracks "Withering Waves" and "The Fractured One." The album debuted at #18 on the Billboard Heatseekers chart, selling 1,250 copies in its first week.

== Background ==
Black Crown Initiate announced via their Facebook page in January 2014 that they would be embarking on the 2014 Metal Alliance Tour supporting 1349, Goatwhore and Behemoth. After finishing the tour, the band returned to the studio, again with Carson Slovak. On June 19 the band announced through their Facebook page, their signing to eOne Music, and that their full-length debut album would be on its way.

On signing with the label, guitarist Andy Thomas stated: “We started this band with absolutely no clue how far it would take us. It has been an amazing time, as of today, we can honestly say that we are starting a new chapter in our careers; one that will afford us opportunities that we never imagined. We are absolutely honored to be part of the eOne family.”

Later that summer, the band went on tour with Septicflesh and Fleshgod Apocalypse, followed by their first tour outside the US into Canada on the Summer Slaughter tour with The Faceless, Fallujah, and Rings of Saturn.

In July 2014, the band announced their debut LP The Wreckage of Stars would be released on September 30 of the same year. In August the band released the album's first single "A Great Mistake." In September the band premiered a second single, "Withering Waves." Soon thereafter, the band released their first-ever music video for "Withering Waves" exclusively through Revolver Magazine. The album was officially released on September 30, 2014, and debuted at #18 on the Billboard Heatseekers chart. In November the band launched an Indegogo campaign to raise $25,000 for a new touring van. Additionally in November the band released a music video for "The Fractured One." The video served as a follow-up to the video for "Withering Waves" and was directed by Jess Orsburn of Toaster in the Tub Studios.

== Track listing ==
No.	Title	Length
1.	"A Great Mistake"	6:50
2.	"The Fractured One"	3:37
3.	"The Malignant"	7:35
4.	"This Human Lie Manifest"	4:31
5.	"Withering Waves"	6:02
6.	"To The Eye That Leads You"	4:58
7.	"The Wreckage of Stars"	6:40
8.	"Shape's Collapse"	5:04
9.	"Purge"	5:06
10.	"Linear"	2:22
Total length:		52:45
