= Slave to the Sword =

Studio album by Exmortus
- Released: February 4, 2014
- Recorded: February 2013 at Castle Ultimate Studios
- Genre: Thrash metal, melodic death metal
- Length: 49:27
- Label: Prosthetic
- Producer: Zack Ohren, Exmortus

Exmortus chronology
Beyond the Fall of Time (2011)	Slave to the Sword (2014)	Ride Forth (2016)

Singles from Slave to the Sword
- 1. "Immortality Made Flesh" Released: November 7, 2013; 2. "Slave to the Sword" Released: December 19, 2013

Slave to the Sword is the third album by American thrash metal band Exmortus. It was released on February 4, 2014 by Prosthetic Records.

== Track listing ==
All music is composed by Exmortus.

No.	Title	Length
1.	"Rising..."	3:45
2.	"Slave to the Sword"	5:02
3.	"Immortality Made Flesh"	5:37
4.	"Foe Hammer"	4:28
5.	"Warrior of the Night"	5:39
6.	"Ancient Violence"	4:26
7.	"From the Abyss"	5:41
8.	"Moonlight Sonata (Act 3)"	5:30
9.	"Battle-Born"	3:59
10.	"Metal Is King"	5:22
Total length:		49:27

== Credits ==
Exmortus

- Jadran "Conan" Gonzalez – vocals, guitars
- David Rivera – guitars
- Clodoaldo Bibiano – bass
- Mario Moreno – drums

Production

- Zack Ohren – production, engineering
- Philip Lawvere – artwork
- Steve Hilson – layout
- Kristin Brokaw – photography
