= IV: Empires Collapse =

Studio album by Warbringer
- Released: October 29, 2013
- Recorded: Omen Room Studios
- Genre: Thrash metal
- Length: 41:28
- Label: Century Media
- Producer: Steve Evetts

Warbringer chronology
Worlds Torn Asunder (2011)	IV: Empires Collapse (2013)	Woe to the Vanquished (2017)

Professional ratings
Review scores
Source	Rating
Exclaim!	7/10 stars
Metal Injection	7/10 stars
MetalSucks	4/5 stars

IV: Empires Collapse is the fourth studio album by American thrash metal band Warbringer, released on October 29, 2013 via Century Media.

== Track listing ==
All songs written by Warbringer

No.	Title	Length
1.	"Horizon"	3:57
2.	"The Turning of the Gears"	2:54
3.	"One Dimension"	4:09
4.	"Hunter-Seeker"	3:54
5.	"Black Sun, Black Moon"	3:10
6.	"Scars Remain"	4:27
7.	"Dying Light"	4:47
8.	"Iron City"	3:28
9.	"Leviathan"	4:41
10.	"Off with Their Heads!"	1:36
11.	"Towers of the Serpent"	4:25
Total length:		41:28

=== Bonus tracks ===
No.	Title	Length
12.	"Communications Breakdown (Led Zeppelin cover)"	2:19
13.	"Travelin' Band (Bonus Track)"	2:00
Total length:		45:56

== Personnel ==
Warbringer

- John Kevill – vocals
- John Laux – guitar
- Jeff Potts – guitar
- Ben Mottsman – bass
- Carlos Cruz – drums

Production

- Steve Evetts – production
- Adam Hessler – engineering
- Brett Eliason – mixing
- Adrienne Rozzi – artwork
