= Selves We Cannot Forgive =

Studio album by Black Crown Initiate
- Released: July 22, 2016
- Studio: Atrium Audio
- Genre: Technical death metal
- Length: 51:31
- Label: eOne Music
- Producer: Carson Slovak, Grant McFarland

Black Crown Initiate chronology
| The Wreckage of Stars (2014) | Selves We Cannot Forgive (2016) | Violent Portraits of Doomed Escape (2020) |

Singles from Selves We Cannot Forgive
- 1. "For Red Cloud" Released: May 16, 2016; 2. "Selves We Cannot Forgive" Released: June 8, 2016

Professional ratings
Review scores
| Source | Rating |
|---|---|
| Metal Sucks | (4/5) |
| Sputnik Music | (3.5/5) |
| Metal Injection | (8/10) |

Selves We Cannot Forgive is the second full-length album from American extreme metal band Black Crown Initiate. The album was released on July 22, 2016 with eOne Music. It was produced by Carson Slovak and Grant McFarland(August Burns Red, Texas In July, From Ashes To New) and recorded at Atrium Audio Recording Studio's in Lancaster, Pennsylvania, with cover art by Travis Smith(Opeth, Devin Townsend, Avenged Sevenfold).

To date it is the band's strongest-selling album, moving 1,825 copies in its debut week.

== Background ==
After notching over 200 live performances while touring to promote The Wreckage of Stars in 2015, the band announced they were entering the studio to record their sophomore release in February 2016.

On April 20, 2016, the band announced the name of their upcoming album as well as the release date. Selves We Cannot Forgive was set to debut on July 22, 2016.

The album's first promotional single, "For Red Cloud" was released in May, exclusively via MetalSucks. The second promotional single "Vicious Lives" was released in July. A music video for the title track was debuted via VEVO on July 25. The video was directed by Justin Reich.

Selves We Cannot Forgive would prove to be the band's final album with long-time guitarist Rik Stelzpflug, who would depart the band shortly before the release of the album, though he would still receive co-writing credits on "Sorrowpsalm."

Replacing Stelzpflug was former The Faceless and Glass Casket guitarist Wes Hauch, who provided a guest solo on "Again." Though Hauch was pictured with the band before the album was released, he was only credited with the single guitar solo on the album.

Former Vale of Pnath guitarist Mikey Reeves provides a guest solo on "For Red Cloud" and "Transmit to Disconnect."

A music video for "Selves We Cannot Forgive" was released on July 25.

This would be the band's final release with eOne, as they would sign for Century Media Records in 2019.

== Track listing ==
| No. | Title | Length |
|---|---|---|
| 1. | "For Red Cloud" | 6:48 |
| 2. | "Sorrowpsalm" | 6:30 |
| 3. | "Again" | 5:40 |
| 4. | "Belie the Machine" | 8:59 |
| 5. | "Selves We Cannot Forgive" | 5:19 |
| 6. | "Transmit to Disconnect" | 6:28 |
| 7. | "Matriarch" | 7:21 |
| 8. | "Vicious Lives" | 4:26 |
| Total length: | | 51:31 |

== Personnel ==
Black Crown Initiate

- James Dorton – vocals
- Andy Thomas – guitars, clean vocals
- Nick Shaw – bass
- Jesse Beahler – drums

Additional musicians

- Grant McFarland, Sarah Thomas, Amanda Mellinger, Adam Biggs, Jeremy Graeff – backing vocals on "Matriarch"
- Mikey Reeves – guitar solo on "For Red Cloud" and "Transmit to Disconnect"
- Travis Ryan – vocals on "Transmit to Disconnect"
- Wes Hauch – guitar solo on "Again"
- Grant McFarland – cello on "Selves we Cannot Forgive", "Matriarch", and "Fallen Angel"
- Rik Stelzpflug – co-writer on Sorrowpsalm

Production

- Travis Smith – artwork
- Sean Marlow – design
- Paul Grosso – creative direction
- Alan Douches – mastering
- Carson Slovak, Grant McFarland – production
