= Song of the Crippled Bull =

EP by Black Crown Initiate
- Released: July 17, 2013
- Recorded: Atrium Audio
- Genre: Progressive death metal
- Length: 21:34
- Label: Self-released
- Producer: Carson Slovak

Black Crown Initiate chronology
Song of the Crippled Bull (2013)	The Wreckage of Stars (2014)

Song of the Crippled Bull is the debut EP from American based progressive death metal band Black Crown Initiate. It was released independently on July 17, 2013 and quickly became a featured EP on various underground publications. The album was recorded by Carson Slovak at Atrium Audio in Lancaster, Pennsylvania. Slovak is also credited for having designed the artwork.

In an interview with Terrorizer, guitarist Andy Thomas goes in depth about the concept of the EP and some of the themes that surround the music: "Basically, there are a couple of themes running through the album. Microcosmic and macrocosmic, in their nature. The overarching apparent theme is based on Hindu texts. A four stage cycle in the universe that goes from the creation to destruction, and then recreation. And the last phase is called Caliuga. It’s a phase of complete depravity, everything is almost ruined. If I look around that’s what I see. It’s symbolized by iron, an extension of the Iron Age, and also by a one-legged bull. The first phase is known as the Golden Age, which you read about in all this different cultures, but that’s symbolized by a bull with all his legs. We’re now living in the age of the one-legged bull, which is what The Song Of The Crippled Bull is all about."

== Track listing ==
All lyrics are written by Andy Thomas; all music is composed by Thomas and Nick Shaw.

No.	Title	Length
1.	"Stench of The Iron Age"	7:14
2.	"Ghost She Sends"	6:27
3.	"The Mountain Top"	3:17
4.	"Song of The Crippled Bull"	4:36
Total length:		21:34

== Reception ==
"The band’s debut EP, Song of the Crippled Bull, is an epic four-part suite of progressive death metal sanctity that shouldn’t be ignored. The utter brutality matched with a sense of grandeur and melodic reprieve is immensely impressive." - No Clean Singing

"A very good start for an up and coming metal band, and a promising release that shows what they are capable of becoming." - Sputnik Music

"'Song of The Crippled Bull' is fantastic on almost every level, and the major complaint is that it’s a giant tease for their debut LP." - Metal Underground

"Another new exemplar of the fast-growing modern prog-death scene – think mechanized hyperspeed technicality and shimmering chord flurries." - Metalsucks

== Personnel ==
- James Dorton – vocals
- Andy Thomas – guitars, clean vocals
- Nick Shaw – bass
- Jeff Willet – drums
- Carson Slovak – recording, mixing, engineering, production, artwork
