= In Hatred's Flame =

Studio album by Exmortus
- Released: July 29, 2008
- Studio: Love Juice Labs, June 2007-January 2008
- Genre: Thrash metal, melodic death metal
- Length: 42:55
- Label: Heavy Artillery Records

Exmortus chronology
In Hatred's Flame (2008)	Beyond the Fall of Time (2011)

In Hatred's Flame is the debut studio album by American thrash metal band Exmortus. It was released on July 29, 2008, on Heavy Artillery Records.

== Track listing ==
No.	Title	Length
1.	"In Hatred's Flame"	3:44
2.	"Triumph By Fire"	4:02
3.	"War Gods"	3:53
4.	"Onward to Battle"	3:49
5.	"Valor and Might"	5:11
6.	"Axes of War"	3:15
7.	"Glory on the Battlefield"	3:26
8.	"Onslaught"	4:07
9.	"Storms"	3:24
10.	"Wrath of Vengeance"	4:13
11.	"Fimbulwinter"	3:54
Total length:		42:55

== Credits ==
Exmortus

- Balmore Lemus – vocals, guitars
- Jadran "Conan" Gonzalez – guitars
- Daniel Duarte – Bass
- Mario Moreno – drums
