= Monarchy (Rivers of Nihil album) =

2015 studio album by Rivers of Nihil

Studio album by Rivers of Nihil
- Released: August 21, 2015
- Studios: Atrium Studios in Lancaster, Brody Uttley's home studio in Douglassville, Pennsylvania
- Genres: Technical death metal, progressive death metal
- Length: 49:26
- Label: Metal Blade
- Producers: Carson Slovak, Grant McFarland

Rivers of Nihil chronology
The Conscious Seed of Light (2013)	Monarchy (2015)	Where Owls Know My Name (2018)

Singles from Monarchy
- 1. "Perpetual Growth Machine" Released: June 10, 2015; 2. "Monarchy" Released: July 8, 2015; 3. "Sand Baptism" Released: August 3, 2015

Professional ratings
Review scores
Source	Rating
AngryMetalGuy	1.5/5 stars
Metal Hammer	3.5/5 stars

Monarchy is the second studio album by American technical death metal band Rivers of Nihil. The album was released on August 21, 2015, via Metal Blade Records, and is the band's first album to feature guitarist Jon Topore, and the last to feature drummer Alan Balamut. Monarchy is the second album in the band's tetralogy based around the four seasons; it represents summer.

== Background and promotion ==
In October of 2014, the band parted ways with guitarist and original band member Jonathan Kunz, and replaced him with Jon Topore.

In April of 2015, Rivers of Nihil announced that they'd completed work on a follow-up album to 2013's The Conscious Seed of Light. The band had returned to Atrium studios to work with Carson Slovak and Grant McFarland. Slovak had worked with the band in 2009 to record their debut EP Hierarchy.

On June 10, 2015, the band announced the title of the album, Monarchy, set a release date for August 21, and debuted the track "Perpetual Growth Machine." On August 17, 2015, the band made Monarchy available for streaming in full.

On July 8, the band released the album's title track "Monarchy" as a single. On August 3rd the band debuted the track "Sand Baptism" along with a music video, directed by David Brodsky.

The album was released on August 21, 2015, and sold 1,175 copies in its first week.

Album artwork was created by Dan Seagrave, who would handle the artwork on the band's other two albums as well. Seagrave explained:, "This image continues the theme from the previous record. The season is now based around summer. In the text of the narrative we have shifted significantly forward in time, many thousands of years. The image depicts roughly the same location as the last album. The middle eroded tower holds on the top left, the steps which had led up to the life form 'pod'. A very small detail. In the background are the now heavily eroded, and sand covered structures seen in that last artwork. The small statues dotted around depict the new life form that had succeeded us."

In February 2016, the band released a live video for the track "Monarchy."

== Track listing ==
All music is composed by Rivers of Nihil.

No.	Title	Length
1.	"Heirless"	2:24
2.	"Perpetual Growth Machine"	4:52
3.	"Reign of Dreams"	3:16
4.	"Sand Baptism"	4:49
5.	"Ancestral, I"	4:33
6.	"Dehydrate"	4:00
7.	"Monarchy"	5:43
8.	"Terrestria II: Thrive"	5:59
9.	"Circles in the Sky"	6:27
10.	"Suntold"	7:23
Total length:		49:26

== Personnel ==
Production and performance credits are adapted from the album Liner Notes.

Rivers of Nihil

- Jake Dieffenbach – lead vocals
- Brody Uttley – lead guitar
- Adam Biggs – bass, backing vocals
- Jon Topore – rhythm guitar
- Alan Balamut – drums

Production

- Dan Seagrave – artwork
- Brody Uttley – additional engineering
- Alan Douches – mastering
- Carson Slovak, Grant McFarland – production, engineering, mixing
