= Weapons of Tomorrow =

Studio album by Warbringer
- Released: April 24, 2020
- Recorded: 2019
- Genre: Thrash metal
- Length: 50:56
- Label: Napalm
- Producer: Mike Plotnikoff

Warbringer chronology
Woe to the Vanquished (2017)	Weapons of Tomorrow (2020)	Wrath and Ruin (2025)

Weapons of Tomorrow is the sixth studio album by the American thrash metal band Warbringer. Following the success of Woe to the Vanquished (2017), it is the first album to feature Chase Bryant on bass. During its first week of release, it reached #63 in the Belgian charts.

== Background and lyrics ==
Speaking about the album, lead singer John Kevill said he sees this album as "a 2.0 stage of the band" and that "this is, as far as what we've achieved as a band, the definitive era." He drew inspiration from many sources for the album, including Joseph Conrad's Heart of Darkness and Victor Hugo's The Hunchback of Notre-Dame. In reference to the song Heart of Darkness, "At the heart of all of this large scale human evil that you get is this question of if you could rule and dominate your fellow man, would you? I think that the ugly true answer is that for a lot of people, most people believe yes is the answer. [...] The song is about unpacking all that and dealing with the fact that that's the world we're standing on."

== Release ==
The album's title and artwork were revealed in February 2020, along with the release of a rerecording of 2019's single Firepower Kills for the album. In the months following the release of the album, Napalm Records released a documentary about the album on YouTube in which the band discussed the history of each song.

== Critical reception ==
Professional ratings
Review scores
Source	Rating
Blabbermouth.net	8/10 stars
Distorted Sound	9/10 stars
Sonic Perspectives	9/10 stars

Dom Lawson of Blabbermouth praised the "imaginative spirit" and "flat-out, swivel-eyed thrash fucking metal", saying "[the album] feels like the kind of thrash metal album that bands used to make in the genre's glory days." Fraser Wilson of Distorted Sound lauded the opening track Firepower Kills, saying "This is modern thrash at its very best." Calling the album "lyrically stunning and musically eviscerating", he highlighted Heart of Darkness as "a real standout", saying it "showcases the sonic range of the band." Jonathan Smith of Sonic Perspectives called the album "genius" and "stylistically intricate", saying "Warbringer have definitely hit a sweet spot" with the album. He highlighted "Crushed Beneath The Tracks' and "Power Unsurpassed", calling them "punchy riff monsters."

== Track listing ==
All lyrics by John Kevill

No.	Title	Music	Length
1.	"Firepower Kills"	Carlos Cruz, John Kevill	4:21
2.	"The Black Hand Reaches Out"	Carlos Cruz	3:57
3.	"Crushed Beneath the Tracks"	Carlos Cruz	4:21
4.	"Defiance of Fate"	Carlos Cruz	7:08
5.	"Unraveling"	Carlos Cruz	3:21
6.	"Heart of Darkness"	Adam Carroll, Carlos Cruz	7:12
7.	"Power Unsurpassed"	Carlos Cruz	3:50
8.	"Outer Reaches"	Adam Carroll, Carlos Cruz	4:49
9.	"Notre Dame (King of Fools)"	Adam Carroll, Carlos Cruz	5:18
10.	"Glorious End"	Adam Carroll, Carlos Cruz, John Kevill	6:40
Total length:			50:56

Bonus track
No.	Title	Length
11.	"Fight Back (Discharge Cover)"	1:18
12.	"Remembrance (Instrumental)"	3:24
Total length:		55:46

== Personnel ==
Warbringer

- John Kevill – vocals
- Chase Becker – guitar
- Adam Carroll – guitar
- Chase Bryant – bass
- Carlos Cruz – drums

Additional personnel

- Mike Plotnikoff – production
- Zack Ohren – mixing
- Justin Schturtz – mastering
- Andreas Marschall – artwork

== Charts ==
Chart (2020)	Peak position
Belgian Albums (Ultratop Flanders)	63
