= Wrath and Ruin =

Studio album by Warbringer
- Released: March 14, 2025
- Recorded: 2024
- Genre: Thrash metal
- Length: 40:06
- Label: Napalm
- Producer: Mark Lewis

Warbringer chronology
| Weapons of Tomorrow (2020) | Wrath and Ruin (2025) |

Singles from Wrath and Ruin
- 1. "A Better World" Released: January 9, 2025; 2. "The Sword And The Cross" Released: February 11, 2025; 3. "Through A Glass, Darkly" Released: March 14, 2025

Professional ratings
Review scores
| Source | Rating |
|---|---|
| Angry Metal Guy | 2.5/5 |
| Blabbermouth.net | 7.5/10 |
| Distorted Sound | 9/10 |
| Sonic Perspectives | 9/10 |

Wrath and Ruin is the seventh studio album by the American thrash metal band Warbringer, released on March 14, 2025, five years after their previous album Weapons of Tomorrow.

== Background and lyrics ==
Speaking about the album, lead singer John Kevill said that it has different lyrical themes including "class, power, technofeudalism, socioeconomics and modern dystopia." He drew inspiration for the album title Wrath and Ruin, which continues the band's theme of starting with a W-word in most of their albums, from a quote in J. R. R. Tolkien's The Return of the King spoken by Théoden, "Now for wrath, now for ruin and a red nightfall!" The cover art depicts, according to Kevill, "an ivory tower above the clouds and the lords rain down wrath and ruin upon those below them to keep them destitute and miserable. It sounded quite cruel and cold from a word perspective."

== Release and promotion ==
The album's title and artwork were revealed in January 2025. The announcement came with the release of the single "A Better World". The band will tour in promotion of the album, co-headlining a North American tour with Allegaeon in March and April 2025, with bands Skeletal Remains and Summoning the Lich as opening acts. The band will also support Kreator in Europe on the latter's Demonic Summer tour in July 2025, alongside Rotting Christ.

== Track listing ==
All lyrics by John Kevill.

| No. | Title | Music | Length |
|---|---|---|---|
| 1. | "The Sword and the Cross" | Adam Carroll, Carlos Cruz | 6:07 |
| 2. | "A Better World" | Adam Carroll, Carlos Cruz | 3:45 |
| 3. | "Neuromancer" | Carlos Cruz | 5:27 |
| 4. | "The Jackhammer" | Carlos Cruz | 3:14 |
| 5. | "Through a Glass, Darkly" | Carlos Cruz | 4:58 |
| 6. | "Strike from the Sky" | Carlos Cruz | 3:44 |
| 7. | "Cage of Air" | Adam Carroll, Carlos Cruz | 6:50 |
| 8. | "The Last of My Kind" | Adam Carroll, Carlos Cruz, Chase Bryant | 6:01 |
| Total length: | | | 40:06 |

== Personnel ==
Warbringer

- John Kevill – vocals
- Chase Becker – guitar
- Adam Carroll – guitar
- Chase Bryant – bass
- Carlos Cruz – drums, keyboards, additional guitars

Additional personnel

- Mark Lewis – production, recording, mixing, engineering
- Justin Schturtz – mastering
- Andreas Marschall – artwork
- Alex Solca – photography
