= Ride Forth =

Studio album by Exmortus
- Released: January 8, 2016
- Genre: Thrash metal, melodic death metal
- Length: 43:26
- Label: Prosthetic
- Producer: Zack Ohren

Exmortus chronology
Slave to the Sword (2014)	Ride Forth (2016)	The Sound of Steel (2018)

Ride Forth is the fourth studio album by American thrash metal band Exmortus. It was released on January 8, 2016 on Prosthetic Records.

== Track listing ==
No.	Title	Length
1.	"Speed of the Strike"	4:43
2.	"Relentless"	4:00
3.	"For the Horde"	4:40
4.	"Let Us Roam"	3:56
5.	"Black Sails"	4:54
6.	"Hymn of Hate"	5:14
7.	"Appassionata"	5:09
8.	"Death to Tyrants"	4:44
9.	"Fire and Ice"	6:11
