= Beyond the Fall of Time =

Studio album by Exmortus
- Released: September 6, 2011
- Genre: Thrash metal, melodic death metal
- Length: 46:53
- Label: Earache Records
- Producer: Dross

Exmortus chronology
In Hatred's Flame (2008)	Beyond the Fall of Time (2011)	Slave to the Sword (2014)

Beyond the Fall of Time is the second studio album by American thrash metal band Exmortus. It was released on September 6, 2011 on Earache Records.

Professional ratings
Review scores
Source	Rating
Blabbermouth	8/10

== Track listing ==
No.	Title	Length
1.	"Bane Forthcoming"	1:08
2.	"Kneel Before the Steel"	6:11
3.	"Black XIII"	4:03
4.	"Beyond the Nile..."	2:33
5.	"Entombed With the Pharaohs"	6:20
6.	"Destroy"	5:25
7.	"Crawling Chaos"	5:36
8.	"Left to Die in the Paradox of Time"	6:18
9.	"Khronos (Forever in the Void)"	3:05
10.	"The Gathering"	6:04
Total length:		46:53

== Credits ==
Exmortus

- Jadran "Conan" Gonzalez – vocals, guitars
- Sean Redline – guitars
- Daniel Duarte – bass
- Mario Moreno – drums
