= Waking into Nightmares =

Studio album by Warbringer
- Released: May 19, 2009 (US); May 25, 2009 (EU)
- Recorded: January 2009
- Studios: Sharkbite Studios, Oakland, California
- Genre: Thrash metal
- Length: 40:14
- Label: Century Media
- Producer: Gary Holt

Warbringer chronology
War Without End (2008)	Waking into Nightmares (2009)	Worlds Torn Asunder (2011)

Professional ratings
Review scores
Source	Rating
AllMusic	4/5 stars
Rock Sound	7/10 stars

Waking into Nightmares is the second album by the American thrash metal band Warbringer, released on May 19, 2009, in the U.S. and May 25, 2009, in Europe. It was produced by Gary Holt, guitarist of thrash metal band Exodus. The cover art was painted by Dan Seagrave. A video for the song Severed Reality was produced. Waking into Nightmares sold around 2,000 copies in its first week of release in the U.S.

== Track listing ==
All music by Warbringer, all lyrics by John Kevill, except track 8 by Ben Bennett

No.	Title	Length
1.	"Jackal"	3:09
2.	"Living in a Whirlwind"	3:21
3.	"Severed Reality"	3:59
4.	"Scorched Earth"	3:44
5.	"Abandoned by Time"	4:21
6.	"Prey for Death"	4:46
7.	"Nightmare Anatomy" (instrumental)	4:02
8.	"Shadow from the Tomb"	4:07
9.	"Senseless Life"	4:57
10.	"Forgotten Dead"	4:03
Total length:		40:14

=== Bonus tracks ===
No.	Title	Length
11.	"The Road Warrior"	3:47
12.	"Humans to Kill (a re-recording of "Zombie", a pre-Warbringer band)"	4:02
Total length:		48:03

== Personnel ==
Warbringer

- John Kevill – vocals
- John Laux – guitar
- Adam Carroll – guitar
- Ben Bennett – bass, vocals on track 8
- Nic Ritter – drums

Production

- Gary Holt – production, guitar solo on track 11
- Adam Myatt – engineering
- Zack Ohren – mixing
- Dan Seagrave – artwork
