= War Without End (album) =

Studio album by Warbringer
- Released: February 5, 2008
- Genre: Thrash metal
- Length: 39:26
- Label: Century Media
- Producer: Bill Metoyer

Warbringer chronology
One By One, the Wicked Fall (2006)	War Without End (2008)	Waking into Nightmares (2009)

Professional ratings
Review scores
Source	Rating
AllMusic	4/5 stars
Pitchfork	7.5/10 stars

War Without End is the debut album released by the American thrash metal band Warbringer on February 5, 2008 via Century Media Records.

== Track listing ==
All songs written by Warbringer.

No.	Title	Length
1.	"Total War"	4:30
2.	"Systematic Genocide"	3:49
3.	"Dread Command"	2:52
4.	"Hell on Earth"	3:17
5.	"At the Crack of Doom"	3:40
6.	"Beneath the Waves"	3:49
7.	"Instruments of Torture"	3:36
8.	"Shoot to Kill"	3:13
9.	"Born of the Ruins"	3:46
10.	"Combat Shock"	3:52
11.	"Epicus Maximus" (instrumental)	3:02
Total length:		39:26

=== Japanese bonus track ===
No.	Title	Length
12.	"Nightslasher"	3:32
13.	"Onslaught"	3:35
Total length:		42:56

=== Notes ===
- The album was released in red vinyl, which was limited to 1,000 copies and came with an embroidered patch.
- "Epicus Maximus" is an instrumental track and begins after a minute of silence. The song itself is 2:02. This song is also known as "A Dead Current", which was later confirmed to be a fan-created name for the song, being "Epicus Maximus" the original name.
- A song by the name of "Nightslasher" was included on some editions of the album, appearing before "Epicus Maximus".

== Personnel ==
- John Kevill – vocals
- John Laux – guitar
- Adam Carroll – guitar
- Andy Laux – bass
- Ryan Bates – drums
