= Prison (band) =

American nu metal band

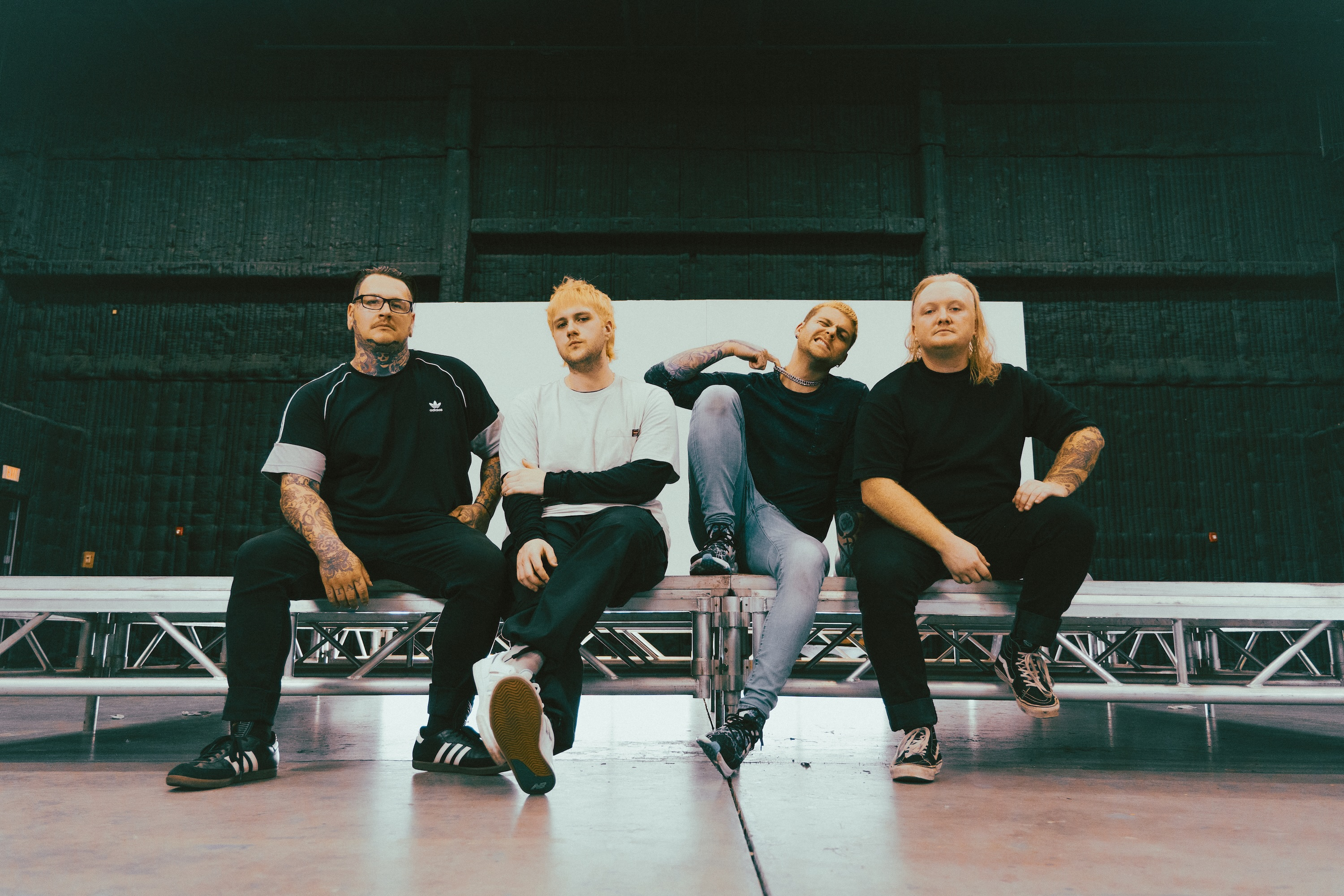
- Prison in 2023, left to right: Jon Pentz (bass), Austin Coupe (guitar), Johnny Crowder (vocals) and Tyler Kruckmeyer (drums).

Background information
- Origin: Tampa, Florida, U.S.
- Genres: Nu-metal; metalcore
- Years active: 2017–present
- Members: Johnny Crowder; Jonathon Pentz; David Kislik; Brandon Thrift
- Past members: Austin Coupe; Tyler Kruckmeyer
- Website: prisonmerch.com

Prison is an American nu-metal band from Tampa, Florida, formed in 2014. The band's lineup consists of vocalist Johnny Crowder, guitarist David Kislik, drummer Brandon Thrift, and bassist Jonathon Pentz.

== History ==
Prison was formed in 2014 by former members of Dark Sermon (Johnny Crowder), Adaliah (Austin Coupe, Tyler Kruckmeyer), and ABACABB/In Alcatraz 1962 (Jonathon Pentz). Prison's lyrics are largely centered around mental health, containing themes of recovery, suicide awareness, sexual consent, loss and sobriety, and have been described as a "message of hope and healing".

Prison became more active in 2017 when Crowder announced that his former band, Dark Sermon, would go on hiatus indefinitely. In that year, the band would release their debut EP, N.G.R.I. In 2019, the band released their first full-length album, Still Alive. The album would track on Billboard's Heatseekers and Independent Albums charts for one week each.

=== Touring ===
In 2017, Prison toured as a supporting act for Suicide Silence's 10-year anniversary tour of The Cleansing, along with Upon a Burning Body, Slaughter to Prevail, and Winds of Plague.

In 2018, Prison toured as a supporting act with Wednesday 13 and Night Club on Combichrist's Everyone Still Hates You tour. They also toured with For the Fallen Dreams.

In 2019, Prison toured alongside Oceano as support for Carnifex. The tour would eventually extend and include Angelmaker as support, with Oceano taking over the as the headliner. Later in the year, Prison, Unearth, and Incite supported Soulfly on their Blood on the Street tour. Prison ended the year supporting Slaughter to Prevail on their North American tour alongside Orthodox.

In 2023, Prison played at HeartSupport Fest, a mission-based music festival focusing on "diversity, acceptance, inclusion, self-love and self-care, and mental health as priority." The festival was hosted by Jake Luhrs, best known for his role as the vocalist of August Burns Red.

== Discography ==
=== Albums ===
List of albums, with selected chart positions
Title	Album details	Peak chart positions		
Title	Album details	US	US Heat.	US Ind.
Still Alive	Released: 2019; Label: N/A	—	14	34
Splitting Black	Released: 2025; Label: N/A	—	—	—
"—" denotes a recording that did not chart or was not released in that territory.

=== EPs ===
List of extended play
Title	EP details
N.G.R.I.	Released: 2017
Live in Texas	Released: 2020
Energy	Released: 2023
