= Worlds Torn Asunder =

Studio album by Warbringer
- Released: September 27, 2011
- Recorded: May–June 2011
- Studios: Omen Room Studios, Garden Grove, California
- Genre: Thrash metal
- Length: 41:24
- Label: Century Media
- Producer: Steve Evetts

Warbringer chronology
Waking into Nightmares (2009)	Worlds Torn Asunder (2011)	IV: Empires Collapse (2013)

Singles from Worlds Torn Asunder
- 1. "Living Weapon" Released: July 25, 2011

Professional ratings
Review scores
Source	Rating
Blistering	8.5/10 stars
Revolver	4/5 stars
Blabbermouth.net	8/10 stars

Worlds Torn Asunder is the third album by the American thrash metal band Warbringer, released on September 27, 2011 via Century Media.

== Track listing ==
All lyrics by John Kevill, except the cover tracks. All music by Warbringer, except where noted.

No.	Title	Music	Length
1.	"Living Weapon"	John Laux	4:21
2.	"Shattered Like Glass"	John Laux	3:22
3.	"Wake Up... Destroy"	Adam Carroll	4:41
4.	"Future Ages Gone"	Adam Carroll	3:55
5.	"Savagery"	Adam Carroll	5:02
6.	"Treacherous Tongue"	John Laux	2:22
7.	"Echoes from the Void"	Carlos Cruz	5:36
8.	"Enemies of the State"	John Laux	3:11
9.	"Behind the Veils of Night" (instrumental)	Carlos Cruz, Adam Carroll	3:21
10.	"Demonic Ecstasy"	John Laux	5:33
Total length:			41:26

=== Japanese edition ===
No.	Title	Music	Length
11.	"(We Are) The Road Crew" (Motörhead cover)	Ian Fraser Kilmister, Eddie Clarke and Phil Taylor	3:14
12.	"Sacrifice" (Bathory cover)	Quorthon	3:32
13.	"Execute Them All" (Unleashed cover)	Unleashed	3:30
Total length:			51:25

== Personnel ==
Warbringer

- John Kevill – vocals
- John Laux – guitar
- Adam Carroll – guitar
- Andy Laux – bass
- Carlos Cruz – drums

Production

- Steve Evetts – production and mixing
- Dan Seagrave – artwork
