= In Tongues (Dark Sermon album) =

Studio album by Dark Sermon
- Released: March 26, 2013 (NA) April 12, 2013 (EU)
- Recorded: Audiohammer Studios
- Genre: Blackened death metal, deathcore, melodic death metal
- Length: 43:57
- Label: eOne Music Nuclear Blast Records
- Producer: Eyal Levi

Dark Sermon chronology
In Tongues (2013)	The Oracle (2015)

In Tongues is the debut full-length record by blackened death metal/deathcore band Dark Sermon. The album was released in North America through eOne Music on March 26, 2013 and in Europe through Nuclear Blast Records on April 12, 2013. The album was recorded at Audiohammer Studios and produced by Eyal Levi, formerly of Dååth, who has worked with Misery Index, Arsis. Two music videos were serviced for this album for "Hounds" and the title track "In Tongues". The artwork was designed and illustrated by Eliran Kantor (Hatebreed, Testament).

Metal Hammer rated the album four stars, stating "At heart this is a death metal record, with all the malevolence, controlled aggression and sinister themes that such focus demands, but there are also lethal hooks by the score and subtle invention lurking between the sonic lines."

== Track listing ==
No.	Title	Length
1.	"The Shepherd's Staff"	3:41
2.	"Imperfect Contrition"	4:03
3.	"Hounds"	4:00
4.	"The Scales of Justice"	3:13
5.	"Cursed"	3:24
6.	"Forfeit I : The Crooked Quill"	4:18
7.	"Forfeit II: Worn Thin"	4:09
8.	"The Tree of New Life"	3:27
9.	"Carcass"	3:09
10.	"Testament"	3:59
11.	"In Tongues"	6:34
Total length:		43:57
