= The Oracle (Dark Sermon album) =

Studio album by Dark Sermon
- Released: August 21, 2015
- Recorded: Pig Pen Recordings
- Genre: Blackened death metal, sludge metal, deathcore
- Length: 53:15
- Label: eOne Music Nuclear Blast Records
- Producer: Kenny Gil

Dark Sermon chronology
In Tongues (2013)	The Oracle (2015)

The Oracle is the second and final album by metal band Dark Sermon. The album was released worldwide on August 21, 2015 through eOne Music (North America) and Nuclear Blast Records (Europe). The album was recorded at Pig Pen Recordings and was co-produced by the band and Kenny Gil at Pig Pen Recordings. This album delivers a slight change from their previous effort, In Tongues, due to its fusion of doom metal and sludge metal as opposed to the fast-paced thrashy death metal sound they have been living off of. The first single from this album, "Starve", was released on June 18, 2014 over a year prior to the album's official release. Two music videos were shot for this album for the tracks "Rat King" and "The Eyeless Needle".

Vocalist Johnny Crowder discusses the themes behind this album as well as the concept for the artwork :

"It discusses how misguided, filthy, backwards, and wholly underdeveloped the kingdom of man is currently, especially when compared to its true potential. As a species, humans have a lot of work to do in order to grow and ascend."

"The album art portrays the Divine Feminine in her human form. She speaks with the stars and sacrifices herself in martyrdom, understanding that blood is the only channel the children of Earth are willing to comprehend." The artwork was designed and illustrated by Shaun Beaudry.

== Track listing ==
No.	Title	Length
1.	"Ode to the Black Widow"	3:26
2.	"In Each Hand, A Talisman of Sacred Stone"	5:54
3.	"Children of Gaia"	6:13
4.	"The Myth of Sanity"	5:40
5.	"Rat King"	4:37
6.	"Starve"	4:34
7.	"The Eyeless Needle"	5:43
8.	"Both in Equal Parts"	5:10
9.	"The Wraith"	6:28
10.	"Gargantua"	5:30
Total length:		53:15
