= The Conscious Seed of Light =

2013 debut studio album by Rivers of Nihil

Studio album by Rivers of Nihil
- Released: October 15, 2013
- Studios: Mana Recording Studios, Tampa, Florida
- Genre: Technical death metal
- Length: 40:46
- Label: Metal Blade
- Producer: Erik Rutan

Rivers of Nihil chronology
The Conscious Seed of Light (2013)	Monarchy (2015)

Singles from The Conscious Seed of Light
- 1. "Rain Eater" Released: August 20, 2013; 2. "Mechanical Trees" Released: September 18, 2013; 3. "Soil & Seed" Released: September 25, 2013; 4. "A Fertile Altar" Released: November 22, 2013; 5. "Airless" Released: February 19, 2014; 6. "Birth of the Omnisavior" Released: April 30, 2014

The Conscious Seed of Light is the debut studio album by American technical death metal band Rivers of Nihil. The album was released on October 15, 2013, via Metal Blade Records. It is the first album in the band's tetralogy based around the four seasons; it represents spring.

== Background and promotion ==
On December 10, 2012, Metal Blade Records announced that they had signed Rivers of Nihil to a record deal, and released a demo for the song "Rain Eater". The label also announced that the band would be working with Erik Rutan of Hate Eternal and Morbid Angel to record their first studio album at Mana Recording Studios in Tampa, Florida.

Album artwork was created by Dan Seagrave, who would handle the artwork on the band's next three albums as well. Seagrave explained: "For this artwork I was thinking about Roman ruins, as well as Egyptian and Aztec culture. I had visited Pompei and tried to use the feeling of ancient lost history in this artwork."

The version of "Rain Eater" that appears on this album was uploaded on YouTube on August 20, 2013. This was followed in September 2013 by singles "Mechanical Trees" and "Soil & Seed".

In promotion of the album, the band released three more singles with their own videos: a lyric video for "A Fertile Altar", a play-through video for "Airless", and a music video for "Birth of the Omnisavior".

== Track listing ==
All music is composed by Rivers of Nihil.

No.	Title	Length
1.	"Terrestria I: Thaw"	1:45
2.	"Rain Eater"	5:00
3.	"Birth of the Omnisavior"	4:26
4.	"Soil & Seed"	5:06
5.	"Central Antheneum"	3:55
6.	"Mechanical Trees"	4:25
7.	"Place of Serpents"	3:43
8.	"Human Adaptation"	3:21
9.	"A Fertile Altar"	3:15
10.	"Airless"	5:50
Total length:		40:46

== Personnel ==
Production and performance credits are adapted from the album liner notes.

Rivers of Nihil

- Jake Dieffenbach – lead vocals
- Brody Uttley – lead guitar
- Adam Biggs – bass, backing vocals
- Jon Kunz – rhythm guitar
- Ron Nelson – drums

Production

- Dan Seagrave – artwork
- Brian Elliott – additional engineering
- Alan Douches – mastering
- Adrian Perez – photography
- Erik Rutan – production, engineering, mixing
