= Rivers of Nihil =

American technical death metal band

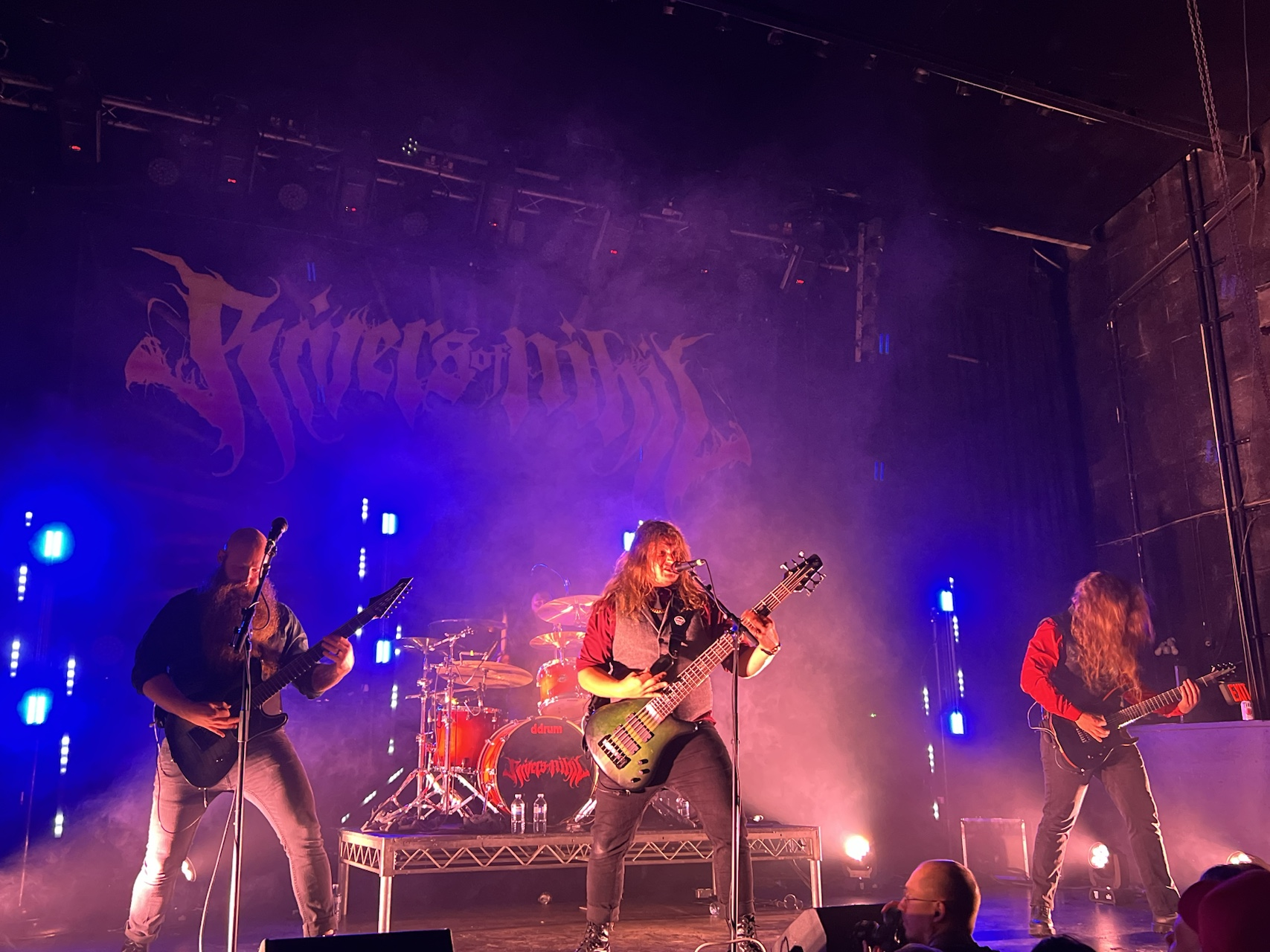
- Rivers of Nihil performing in 2025.

Background information
- Origin: Reading, Pennsylvania, U.S.
- Genres: Technical death metal, progressive death metal
- Years active: 2009–present
- Label: Metal Blade
- Members: Brody Uttley; Adam Biggs; Jared Klein; Andy Thomas
- Past members: Jake Dieffenbach; Jon Kunz; Ron Nelson; Alan Balamut; Jon Topore; Dylan Potts
- Website: www.metalblade.com/riversofnihil/

Rivers of Nihil is an American technical death metal band from Reading, Pennsylvania. They are currently signed to Metal Blade Records. To date the band has released two EPs and five studio albums. Their most recent release is 2025's self-titled album Rivers of Nihil. Their 2018 album Where Owls Know My Name debuted at number 61 on the Billboard 200, selling 2,750 copies in its first week.

== History ==
Rivers of Nihil was formed in 2009. They recorded their first EP Hierarchy later that year with Century vocalist Carson Slovak, who produced numerous works by other bands such as August Burns Red, Texas in July, and Black Crown Initiate (Slovak would later work with the band on their second and third studio albums, adding writing credits to "Terrestria III: Wither" on Where Owls Know My Name). During this period the band opened shows for bands such as Decapitated, Decrepit Birth, Suffocation, Dying Fetus, and Misery Index.

In 2011, the band worked with producer Len Carmichael to record their second EP Temporality Unbound. The album would spawn a music video for the song “(sin)Chronos".

In February 2012, MetalSucks referred to Rivers of Nihil as the "best new Death metal band you'll hear this year".

On December 10, 2012, Metal Blade Records announced that they had signed Rivers of Nihil to a record deal, and released a demo for the song "Rain Eater". The label also announced that the band would be working with Erik Rutan of Hate Eternal and Morbid Angel to record their first studio album at Mana Recording Studios in Tampa, Florida. The band released the album in the United States on October 15, 2013. The album artwork was created by Dan Seagrave, who would handle the artwork on the band's next two albums as well.

Rivers of Nihil returned to Atrium studios to work again with Slovak on their second full-length studio album, Monarchy, which was released on August 21, 2015. The album sold 1,175 copies in its first week. On August 17, 2015, the band made Monarchy available for streaming in full.

On September 7, 2017, the band announced via their Facebook account that they had returned to the studio, once again working at Atrium Audio, and working again with audio engineers Carson Slovak and Grant McFarland. The band recruited The Kennedy Veil's live drummer Jared Klein to track drums. On March 16, 2018, the band released Where Owls Know My Name as well as a music video for the song "A Home". Metal Injection gave the album a perfect 10/10 score. The band also played Texas Independence Fest in Austin that year.

On September 24, 2021, the band released their fourth album, titled The Work. It was elected by Loudwire as the 22nd best rock/metal album of 2021. Topore left the band in April 2022. On October 20, 2022, the band announced that they had parted ways with lead singer Jake Dieffenbach; Biggs later explained that Dieffenbach "just couldn’t really keep himself together between tours" and "it was impossible to maintain a positive working relationship there".

On June 15, 2023, the band released a new single, "The Sub-Orbital Blues". It marked the band's first new music with Biggs handling lead vocals, and also their first featuring ex-Black Crown Initiate guitarist Andy Thomas. The band released a second single, titled "Hellbirds" on October 19.

On April 29, 2024, the band released a single titled "Criminals" and an accompanying music video. The band released an instrumental version of the album "The Work" on July 19. In October of 2024, Metal Blade Records announced that Rivers of Nihil would be re-releasing a remixed, remastered version of their debut EP Hirearchy on November 8.

On February 4, 2025, the band announced the cover art and track listing for their upcoming, self-titled, album. The band also shared the release was produced at Atrium Audio with producers Carson Slovak & Grant McFarland. The album's release date was set as May 30, with the first single, "House of Light," which was released on February 6. A teaser for the single had previously been released on February 3. On March 12, the band debuted the single "American Death," with an accompanying music video.

In February 2026, the band was announced as part of the lineup for the Louder Than Life music festival in Louisville, scheduled to take place in September.

== Musical style ==
Loudwire said that the band's style was progressive death metal, calling them "one of the heaviest prog metal bands ever." The band's song structures incorporate codas and reprises.

== Band members ==
Current

- Brody Uttley – lead guitar, keyboards, programming (2009–present)
- Adam Biggs – bass (2009–present), lead vocals (2022–present); backing vocals (2009–2022)
- Jared Klein – drums, backing vocals (2017–present)
- Andy Thomas – rhythm guitar, backing vocals (2023–present; touring member 2022)

Touring

- Patrick Corona – saxophone (2019–present)
- Zach Strouse – saxophone (2022)
- Kyle Schaefer – lead vocals (2023)

Former

- Jake Dieffenbach – lead vocals (2009–2022)
- Jon Kunz – rhythm guitar (2009–2014)
- Ron Nelson – drums (2009–2014)
- Alan Balamut – drums (2014–2016)
- Jon Topore – rhythm guitar (2014–2022)
- Dylan Potts – drums (2015–2017)

Timeline

== Discography ==
=== Studio albums ===
Rivers of Nihil discography
- Studio albums: 5
- EPs: 2
- Music videos: 7

List of studio albums, with selected chart positions
Title	Album details	Peak chart positions				
Title	Album details	US	US Heat.	US Indie.	US Rock	US Hard Rock
The Conscious Seed of Light	Released: October 11, 2013; Label: Metal Blade Records	—	—	—	—	—
Monarchy	Released: August 21, 2015; Label: Metal Blade Records	—	17	56	—	32
Where Owls Know My Name	Released: March 16, 2018; Label: Metal Blade Records	61	—	12	21	9
The Work	Released: September 24, 2021; Label: Metal Blade Records	—	11	—	—	—
Rivers of Nihil	Released: May 30, 2025; Label: Metal Blade Records	—	—	—	—	—
"—" denotes a recording that did not chart
