= Black Fast (band) =

American thrash metal band

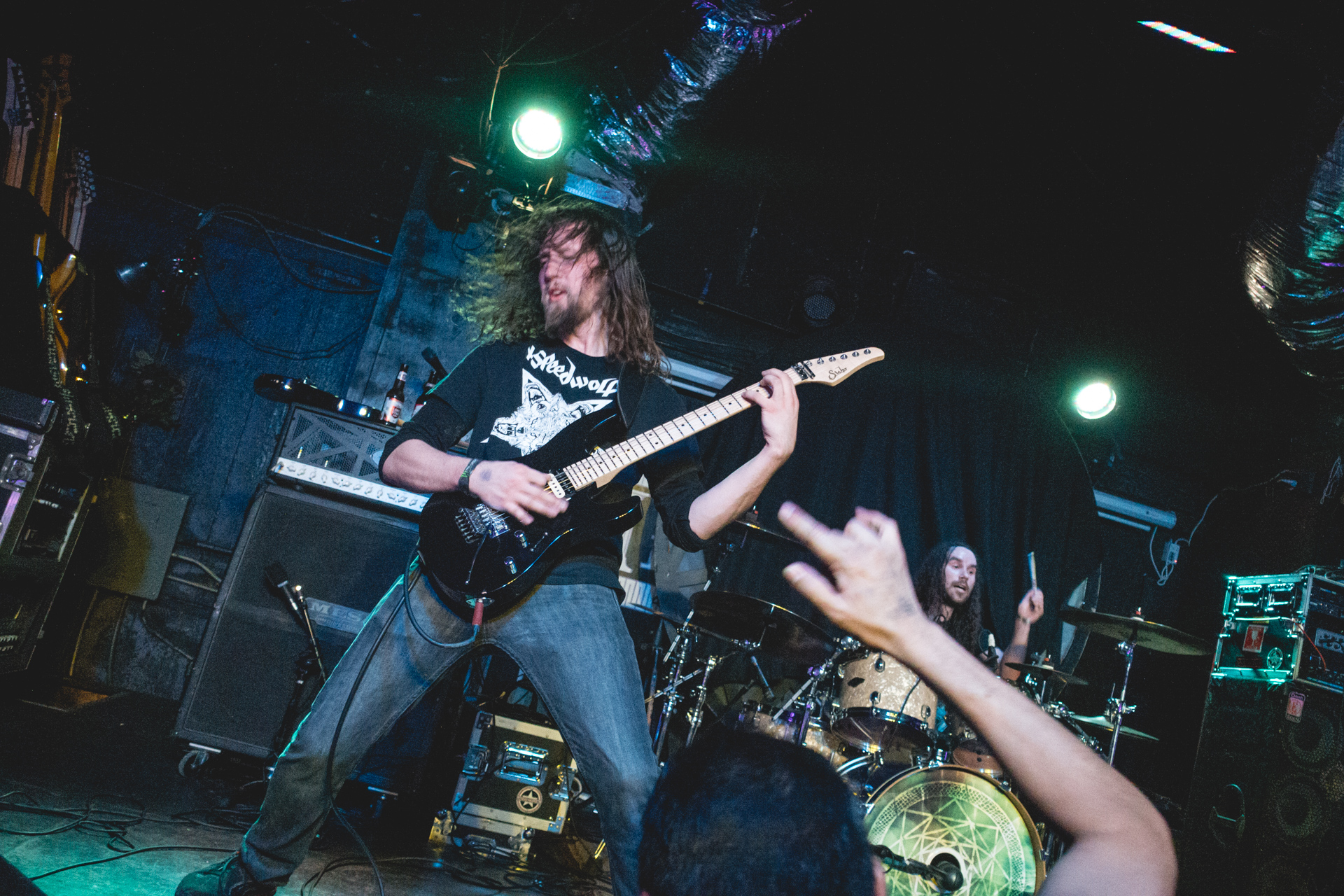
- Black Fast live in 2016

Background information
- Origin: St. Louis, Missouri, U.S.
- Genres: Thrash metal; blackened thrash metal
- Years active: 2010–2019
- Label: eOne Music
- Members: Aaron Akin; Trevor Johanson; Ryan Thompson; Ross Burnett
- Website: blackfastmusic.com

Black Fast was an American thrash metal band from St. Louis, Missouri. The band's original members were Aaron Akin on vocals and rhythm guitar, Ryan Thompson on bass, Trevor Johanson on lead guitar, and Ross Burnett on drums. They released one EP, Black Fast EP, and one independently released and produced album, Starving Out The Light. They signed with eOne Music in 2014 and released their second studio album, Terms of Surrender, the following year. In 2018, the band released their third studio album, Spectre of Ruin.

== History ==
Guitarists Aaron Akin and Trevor Johanson first met at a gas station in Edwardsville, Illinois. Shortly after, Akin's friend, Ross Burnett, and Johanson's college classmate, Ryan Thompson, started playing together, and the band was formed in 2010. Both Johanson and Thompson graduated with music degrees in jazz guitar from Southern Illinois University in Edwardsville.

In April 2011, they released their extended play Black Fast EP 2011. Two years later, their second release and their first full-length, 7-track album, Starving Out The Light, was independently released to Bandcamp, Google Play, iTunes, Spotify, and Amazon on August 16, 2013. The artwork on the album was done by Coby Ellison. The music was mixed and produced by Justin L. Fisher from SmithLee Productions and was mastered by Rob Schlette.

It was announced in November 2014 that Black Fast had signed with the independent label eOne Music. Black Fast announced that its debut studio album with eOne Music produced by Erik Rutan would be released in the summer of 2015. That album, Terms of Surrender, was released on August 7, 2015.

On July 13, 2018, Black Fast released its second studio album with eOne Music, Spectre of Ruin. It was also produced by Erik Rutan.

=== The Breakup ===
Black Fast was ready to hit the road in the fall of 2018 to promote Spectre of Ruin, when they discovered their booking agent had quit without notice. It took them some time to acquire another agent, and the one they hired was unable to book them into the kind of venues they were used to playing or with the name bands they were previously sharing the bill with. This caused considerable frustration. In addition, drummer Ross Burnett was expecting a child, and since bassist Ryan Thompson did not tour with the group, Aaron Akin and Trevor Johanson had serious misgivings after touring with two replacements, so they stopped pursuing tour dates, feeling they had lost the momentum gained from the release of Spectre of Ruin. As a result, over the next several months, Black Fast faded away and unofficially dissolved.

== Live performances ==
On June 28, 2014, Black Fast performed with the bands Shadows Fall, Dead by Wednesday, Hallow Point, and Gray's Divide. Their live performance received a positive review from the website National Rock Review.

Black Fast announced via their Facebook page that they would be performing in the Winter Warriors Tour starting on November 30, 2014, alongside Battlecross, War of Ages, and Wretched. Their live performance was once again reviewed positively.

Since 2015, Black Fast has toured with such bands as Rivers of Nihil, Hatchet, Lord Dying, Black Crown Initiate, Havok, Revocation, Goatwhore, Battlecross, Hate Eternal, and Vektor. In 2016, they toured extensively throughout the U.S. and Canada having booked seven month-long tours and numerous one and two-nighters in between.

== Reception ==
Their first full-length album, Starving Out The Light, was well received according to the ratings submitted on Metal Storm, averaging an 8/10.

Their second full-length album and first studio album Terms of Surrender received positive reviews from Metal Injection Chuck Marshall of the National Rock Review also praised the album saying: "The production and playing on Terms of Surrender are outstanding. The mix is balanced and breathes with the music. A key element of each tune is the razor precision playing of Aaron Akin and Trevor Johanson. From feverish rhythm playing in 'The Keep' to the exquisitely twisting runs in "Tongues of Silver," these guys make it sound easy to create catchy headbanging anthems."

However, MetalSucks gave Terms of Surrender a more lukewarm review, stating: "...but frankly this breakneck locomotion seems to come at a price, with the music coming off slightly sterile and repetitive at times. That's not to say that there isn't pure fire for thrash-heads on Terms of Surrender; there most definitely is, and it sounds legit." The review gave the album 3 stars out of 5.

On July 13, 2018, Black Fast released its final studio album, "Spectre of Ruin," which was met with many positive reviews including metalwani.com. In his review, Chuck Marshall said, "Technicians of deathly thrash, Black Fast return with a beautiful opus of menacing metal on their new album entitled 'Spectre of Ruin'. The metal onslaught is relentless." And Brave Words in their review stated, "Album opener "Cloak of Lies" sets the stage for Spectre of Ruin with a heaping helping of everything Black Fast represents, a locomotive of riffs barreling down the tracks with determined speed and aggression." Revolver magazine called Spectre of Ruin "...a runaway death-train powered by sharp, aggressive riffs, a no-holds-barred approach."

While Distorted Sound Magazine was complimentary, it complained about the lack of contrast: "...the main issue with this record and that is that the musical backdrop is so similar from track to track to the point that if the vocals were taken out, the songs would be almost unidentifiable from one another."

On December 19, 2018, Metal Injection's Aaron Price's Top 10 Albums of 2018 rated Black Fast's Spectre of Ruin the Number 3 album for 2018.

Kerrang! Magazine ranked Black Fast #24 in their feature, The 50 Best American Metal Bands From the Last Decade (2010s).

On July 12, 2022, Metalsucks.org published The 20 Best Thrash Albums Since the Turn of the Millennium, and ranked Black Fast's album, "Terms of Surrender," Number 10, stating, "Brutal but tasty, unorthodox but classic, the record continues to be the band's greatest triumph. You just can't deny a record this f*ckin' good."

== Musical style ==
The band have been described by music journalists and critics as thrash metal and blackened thrash metal. Key aspects of their sound come from their highly technical and complex song structures and black metal influences.

== Discography ==
- Black Fast EP (April 2011)
- Starving Out The Light (August 16, 2013)
- Terms of Surrender (August 7, 2015)
- Spectre of Ruin (July 13, 2018)
