= Exmortus =

American thrash metal band

- Origin: Whittier, California, U.S.
- Genres: Thrash metal, melodic death metal
- Years active: 2002–present
- Labels: Heavy Artillery, Prosthetic, Nuclear Blast
- Members: Jadran "Conan" Gonzalez; Chase Becker; Adrian Aguilar; Brice Snyder
- Website: exmortusmusic.com

Exmortus is an American thrash metal band formed in Whittier, California in 2002. The group has incorporated elements of progressive, death and neo-classical metal into its sound, and their lyrics mostly deal with battles and war.

== Members ==
=== Current members ===
- Jadran "Conan" Gonzalez – guitars (2002–present), lead vocals (2003–2005, 2009–present)
- Chase Becker – guitars (2017–present)
- Adrian Aguilar – drums (2018–present)
- Brice Snyder – bass (2024–present)

=== Past members ===
- "Kevin" – guitars, vocals (2002–2003)
- Balmore Lemus – vocals (2005–2009), bass (2005–2007), guitars (2007–2009)
- Tak Arayan – guitars (2003–2007)
- Sean Redline – guitars (2009–2012)
- "Frost Demon" – bass (2002–2005)
- Daniel Duarte – bass (2007–2011)
- Clodoaldo "Aldo" Bibiano – bass (2011–2013, 2014–2015)
- Jovanni Perez – bass (2013–2014)
- Mike Cosio – bass (2015–2016)
- "Taco Bell Dave" – drums (2002–2003)
- Mario "Mortus" Moreno – drums (2002–2017)
- David Rivera – guitars, backing vocals (2012–2017)
- Carlos Cruz – drums (2017–2018)
- Phillip Nuñez – bass, backing vocals (2016–2024)

Timeline

== Discography ==
=== Studio albums ===
- In Hatred's Flame (2008)
- Beyond the Fall of Time (2011)
- Slave to the Sword (2014)
- Ride Forth (2016)
- The Sound of Steel (2018)
- Necrophony (2023)

=== Extended plays (EPs) ===
- Reign of the War Gods (2006)
- In Hatred's Flame (2007)
- Legions of the Undead (2019)

=== Singles ===
- "Entombed with the Pharaohs" (2010)
- "Immortality Made Flesh" (2013)
- "Slave to the Sword" (2014)
- "For the Horde" (2015)
- "Relentless" (2015)
- "Death to Tyrants" (2015)
- "Appassionata" (2015)
- "Make Hate" (2018)
- "Feat of Flesh" (2018)
- "Victory of Death!" (2018)
- "Swallow Your Soul" (2019)
- "Beetlejuice" (2019)
- "Oathbreaker" (2022)
- "Mind of Metal" (2023)
- "Beyond The Grave" (2023)

=== Demos ===
- Dawn of Apocalypse (2003)
- Onward to Battle (2004)
- Promo Demo (2006)
