= Black Crown Initiate =

American metal band

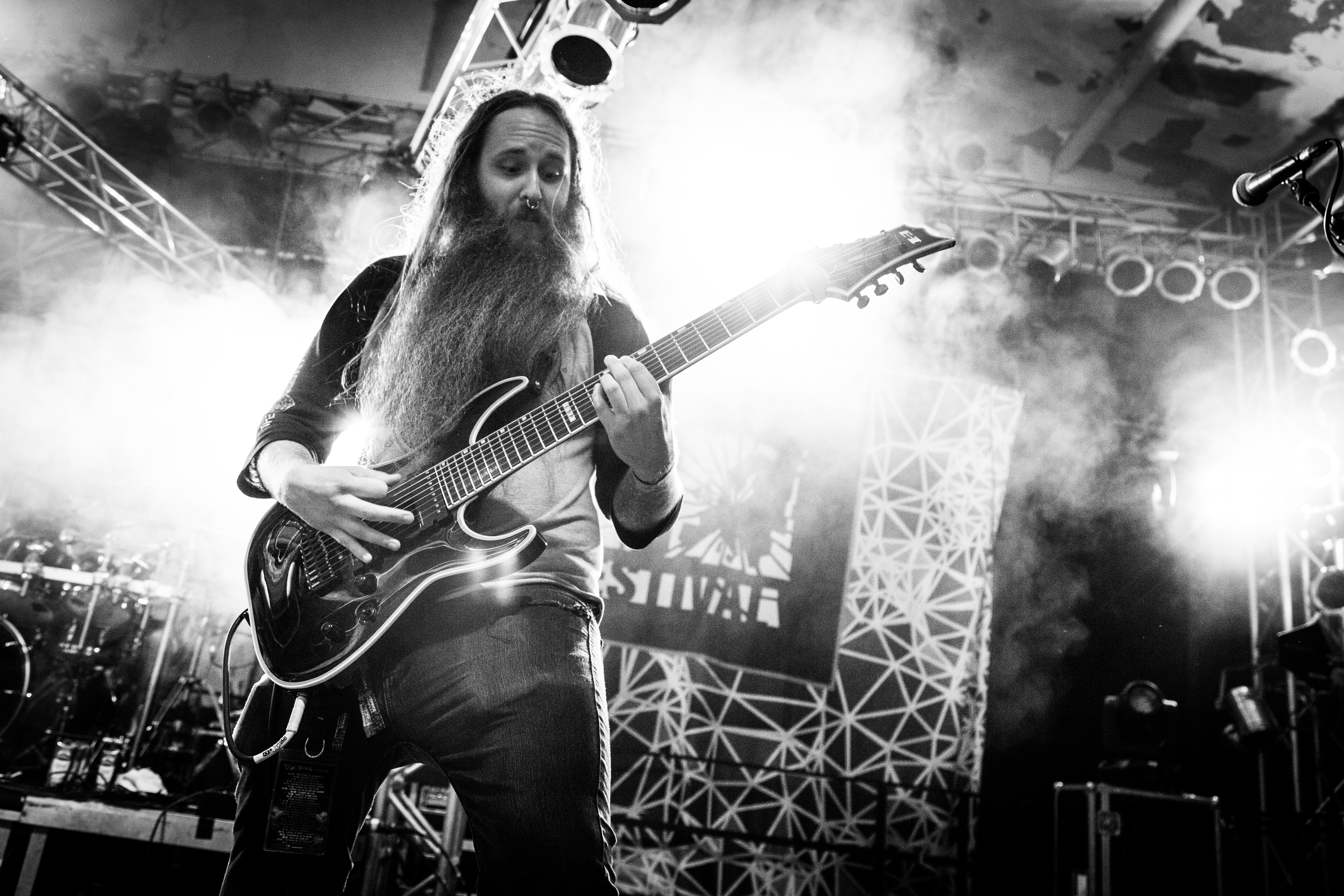
- Black Crown Initiate at Euroblast 2016

Background information
- Origin: Reading, Pennsylvania, United States
- Genres: Technical death metal, progressive death metal
- Years active: 2012–present
- Labels: eOne, Century Media
- Members: James Dorton; Andy Thomas; Nick Shaw; Ethan McKenna
- Past members: Rik Stelzpflug; Wes Hauch; Jeff Willet; Jesse Beahler; Samuel Santiago
- Website: Black Crown Initiate on Facebook

Black Crown Initiate is an American extreme metal band from Reading, Pennsylvania, United States, currently signed to Century Media. The band was formed in 2012 and self-released their first EP Song of the Crippled Bull, which was met with positive reviews. The band began touring in early 2014 with fellow extreme metal bands such as Goatwhore, Behemoth, and 1349; this led to them being signed by eOne Music in June 2014. With eOne, they released both The Wreckage of Stars, on September 30, 2014, and Selves We Cannot Forgive, released on July 22, 2016.

Their third studio album, Violent Portraits of Doomed Escape, was released with Century Media on August 7, 2020.

When asked about the origins of the name "Black Crown Initiate" in a 2016 Reddit AMA, the band stated:

There is a Tibetan spiritual leader that wears a black crown to signify help for humanity. We are all pervert pigs so we help by showing people that, first about ourselves.

== History ==
=== Beginnings and Song of the Crippled Bull (2012–2014) ===
Formed in late 2012, Black Crown Initiate released several demos onto SoundCloud, which led to the creation of their four track EP titled Song of the Crippled Bull. The EP was recorded with Carson Slovak (August Burns Red, Texas In July) at Atrium Audio and was released on July 17, 2013. The EP quickly became the discussion of many underground metal blogs and publications. Due to the success of the EP, what had initially begun as a small project by guitarist Andy Thomas, vocalist James Dorton and bassist Nick Shaw became a full-time endeavor, and they began to recruit members for live performances. The band played their first live show on October 18, 2013, in their hometown with their longtime friends in the band Rivers of Nihil.

=== The Wreckage of Stars (2014–2016) ===
In January 2014 the band posted on their official Facebook page that they would be embarking on the 2014 Metal Alliance Tour supporting 1349, Goatwhore and Behemoth. This was the band's first tour, a rare feat for a band with only one four track EP and having been together for just over a year at the time. After finishing the tour, the band returned to the studio, again with Carson Slovak. On June 19 the band announced through their Facebook page, their signing to eOne Music, and that their full-length debut album would be on its way.

On signing with the label, guitarist Andy Thomas stated: “We started this band with absolutely no clue how far it would take us. It has been an amazing time, as of today, we can honestly say that we are starting a new chapter in our careers; one that will afford us opportunities that we never imagined. We are absolutely honored to be part of the eOne family.”

Later that summer, the band went on tour with Septicflesh and Fleshgod Apocalypse, followed by their first tour outside the US into Canada on the Summer Slaughter tour with The Faceless, Fallujah, and Rings of Saturn.

In July 2014, the band announced their debut LP The Wreckage of Stars would be released on September 30 of the same year. In August the band released the album's first single "A Great Mistake." In September the band premiered a second single, "Withering Waves." Soon thereafter, the band released their first-ever music video for "Withering Waves" exclusively through Revolver Magazine. The album was officially released on September 30, 2014, and debuted at #18 on the Billboard Heatseekers chart. In November the band launched an Indegogo campaign to raise $25,000 for a new touring van. Additionally in November the band released a music video for "The Fractured One." The video served as a follow-up to the video for "Withering Waves" and was directed by Jess Orsburn of Toaster in the Tub Studios.

=== Selves We Cannot Forgive (2016–2020) ===
Black Crown Initiate later appeared at several other festivals such as New England Hardcore Metal Fest, South By So What? and CMJ. In February 2016, the band announced they were back in the studio, again with Carson Slovak, to record their sophomore effort to be released in late spring 2016 through eOne Music. Black Crown Initiate went on tour in March 2016 along with label mates Black Fast. The tour lead them to Austin, Texas, where they performed at the SXSW festival for the first time in their careers. The band was also rumoured to be a part of the Metal Alliance Tour once again this time supporting Dying Fetus, The Acacia Strain and Jungle Rot. The band ultimately did partake in the tour.

In April, the band announced that their second studio album, Selves We Cannot Forgive, would be released on July 22, 2016. The album's first promotional single, "For Red Cloud" was released in May, exclusively via MetalSucks. The second promotional single "Vicious Lives" was released in July. A music video for the title track was debuted via VEVO on July 25. The video was directed by Justin Reich. To date, Selves We Cannot Forgive remains the band's strongest-selling album, moving 1,825 copies in its debut week and landing at #115 on the Billboard Top Album Sales charts. The album was positively reviewed by critics.

In June 2016, the band announced that long-time guitarist Rik Stelzpflug was departing. He was replaced by former The Faceless guitarist Wes Hauch.

In August, while touring with Ne Obliviscaris, and Starkill, the band's van, as well as personal possessions, were stolen in St. Louis, MO. The band launched a crowdfunding campaign in an attempt to recoup their losses.

=== Violent Portraits of Doomed Escape (2020–present) ===
In May 2018, vocalist James Dorton joined Replacire as a full-time member. In August, the band announced their first live show in 2 years (at Beyond Creation's album release show) and that they were recording new music.

On 11 December 2018, the band announced on their official Facebook page that drummer Jesse Beahler and guitarist Wes Hauch had departed the band on good terms to be replaced with drummer Samuel Santiago (Gorod, Beyond Creation, Arkhon Infaustus) and guitarist Ethan McKenna who was the first guitarist that founding members Andy, James and Nick originally asked to join the band. In December 2019, the band recruited drummer Gabe Seeber to work on their new album. In July 2019, the band signed for Century Media Records, and hinted at new music in the near future.

On September 20, 2019, the band released its first new music in three years with the single "Years in Frigid Light." In November 2019, the band announced it was entering the studio to begin work on a new album, with tracking set to commence in "a couple weeks." On March 10, 2020, the band officially announced they'd completed work on the coming album Violent Portraits of Doomed Escape, with a single titled "Invitation" slated to drop the following Friday. In July 2020, a music video was produced for the song "Holy Silence," directed by David Brodsky, with illustrations by Chris Bishop.

Violent Portraits of Doomed Escape was ultimately released on August 7, 2020. It was produced by Carson Slovak and Grant McFarland. with cover art by Schon Wanner. The album sold 1,075 copies in its first week, debuting at No. 85 on the Billboard Top Album Sales chart. It received positive reviews by critics.

In 2021, the band planned to headline a fall tour alongside Arkaik and Inferi, however, the tour was canceled due to complications resulting from the COVID-19 pandemic.

On July 25, 2022, The Faceless announced James Dorton was joining as a full-time member. On August 5, 2022, founding member Andy Thomas announced he had left the band on good terms. The band confirmed his departure and that the band was continuing; however, they had not named a replacement; Thomas has since joined Rivers of Nihil.

A day later on 6 August 2022, founding member Nick Shaw announced his departure to focus on his role as a parent as well as working on making music for a new project that would soon be announced. No replacement has been named yet.

On June 25, 2024, it was announced that guitarist Andy Thomas and bassist Nick Shaw were back and stated that Black Crown Initiate would hopefully be releasing new music "when time permits."

On January 29, 2025, Ne Obliviscaris announced that James Dorton was joining as their new permanent vocalist following the departure of founding member and vocalist Marc “Xenoyr” Campbell.

== Style ==
Black Crown Initiate is known for incorporating various elements of heavy metal and extreme music in their sound. There are traces of progressive metal, ambience, doom metal, and post-rock which often gives them comparisons to Opeth, Gojira, Mastodon, Decapitated and Cynic.

== Members ==
Current

- James Dorton – lead vocals (2012–present)
- Ethan McKenna – rhythm guitar (2018–present)
- Andy Thomas – lead guitar, clean vocals (2012–2022, 2024–present)
- Nick Shaw – bass (2012–2022, 2024–present)

Former

- Rik Stelzpflug – rhythm guitar, backing vocals (2013–2015)
- Wes Hauch – rhythm guitar (2016–2018)
- Jeff Willet – drums (2012–2013)
- Jesse Beahler – drums (2013–2018)
- Samuel Santiago – drums (2018–2019)
- Gabe Seeber – drums (2019)

Former live/touring members

- Greg Paulson – rhythm guitar (2022)
- Zak Baskin – bass (2022)
- Joey Ferretti – drums (2022)
- Nick Miller – bass (2019)

== Discography ==
Extended Plays

2013	Song of the Crippled Bull: Released: July 17, 2013; Label: Self-released

Albums

2014	The Wreckage of Stars: Released: September 30, 2014; Label: eOne Music
2016	Selves We Cannot Forgive: Released: July 22, 2016; Label: eOne Music
2020	Violent Portraits of Doomed Escape: Release: August 7, 2020; Label: Century Media Records

== Tours ==
=== 2014 ===
- Metal Alliance Tour from April 4 to May 3 with Behemoth, Goatwhore, 1349 and Inquisition.
- Conquerors of the World Tour from June 22- July 12 with Septicflesh, Fleshgod Apocalypse and Necronomicon.
- Summer Slaughter Canada Club Tour from August 14–28 with The Faceless, Rings of Saturn, Archspire, and Fallujah.
- Reading Rainbow Tour from September 19 to October 3 with Rivers of Nihil.
- Hell or High Wattage Tour from October 13- October 22 with Unearth, Darkest Hour, Carnifex, Origin, and King Parrot.
- Late Fall Tour from November 30 to December 14 with Crowbar and Unearth.

=== 2015 ===
- Through Space and Grind Tour from January 27 to February 28 with Napalm Death, Voivod, Exhumed and Ringworm.
- Metal Alliance Tour from May 26 to June 20 with Deicide, Entombed, and Hate Eternal. NOTE- Entombed was forced to drop off the tour due to financial concerns they were replaced by Lorna Shore. The tour continued as a Deicide headliner.
- Wreckage of Canada Tour from March 25 to April 4.
- North American Extinction Tour from September 15 to October 7 with Cattle Decapitation, King Parrot, and Dark Sermon.

=== 2016 ===
- Blacker Than All Tour from March 6- March 17 with Black Fast
- Metal Alliance Tour from April 29 to May 29 with Dying Fetus, The Acacia Strain and Jungle Rot.
- The Sumerian Alliance European Tour in September–October with Born of Osiris, Veil of Maya and Volumes.
- The Citadel World Tour in July–August with Ne Obliviscaris and Starkill

=== 2017 ===
- Brewtal Beer Fest 2 - September 9 with Baroness, Fit For An Autopsy, See You Next Tuesday, Greywalker, Post Mortal Possession, Dethlehem, Victims of Contagion, Solarburn, Video Tapes.

=== 2018 ===
- Algorythm Launch - December 8, 2018 with Beyond Creation, First Fragment, Brought by Pain.

=== 2019 ===
- North American Tour - July 25 - August 14 with Vale of Pnath, Inferi, Warforged.

=== 2021 ===
- Fall Tour - September 30 - October 17 with Arkaik, Inferi.
- "Faces of Death" tour - November 11 - March 12 - with Rivers Of Nihil, Archspire, Allegaeon, and To The Grave.

=== 2022 ===
- Origin North America Tour 2022 - February 26 - March 27 with Omnium Gatherum, Allegaeon.

== Notes ==
Cancelled due to COVID-19 pandemic.
Forced to drop off tour in late March due to positive COVID-19 test.
