= List of deathcore artists =

The following is a list of deathcore artists. Deathcore is an extreme metal fusion genre that combines the characteristics of death metal and metalcore and sometimes hardcore punk. It is defined by death metal riffs, blast beats and use of metalcore breakdowns. Deathcore gained most prominence within the southwestern United States, especially Arizona and inland southern California (mostly the Coachella Valley), which are home to many notable bands and various festivals.

== Artists ==
=== A ===
- Abated Mass of Flesh
- The Acacia Strain
- After the Burial
- The Agony Scene
- All Shall Perish
- AngelMaker
- Animosity
- Annotations of an Autopsy
- Antagony
- Arsonists Get All the Girls
- As Blood Runs Black
- Assemble the Chariots
- Attila
- The Autumn Offering
- Aversions Crown

=== B ===
- Beneath the Massacre
- Betraying the Martyrs (early)
- Bhayanak Maut
- The Black Dahlia Murder (early)
- Black Tongue
- Bleed from Within (early)
- Born of Osiris (early)
- Brand of Sacrifice
- The Breathing Process
- Bring Me the Horizon (early)
- The Browning

=== C ===
- Carnifex
- Chelsea Grin
- The Concubine
- The Contortionist (early)
- The Crimson Armada
- Crown Magnetar
- Cryptopsy (The Unspoken King)

=== D ===
- Dance Club Massacre
- Deadwater Drowning
- Despised Icon
- A Different Breed of Killer
- Dir En Grey
- Disembodied Tyrant
- Distant
- Distinguisher
- Dragoncorpse
- Drown in Sulphur

=== E ===
- Elysia
- Embodyment (early)
- Emmure
- End
- Enterprise Earth
- Eternal Lord
- Extortionist

=== F ===
- The Faceless (early)
- Fit for an Autopsy
- Forgetting the Memories
- Frontside

=== G ===
- Glass Casket
- God Forbid
- Gulch

=== H ===
- Heaven Shall Burn
- Here Comes the Kraken
- Humanity's Last Breath

=== I ===
- I Declare War
- Immortal Disfigurement
- Impending Doom
- Infant Annihilator
- Ingested
- In the Midst of Lions
- Ion Dissonance
- Iwrestledabearonce

=== J ===
- Job for a Cowboy (early)
- Justice for the Damned

=== K ===
- Knights of the Abyss

=== L ===
- The Last Ten Seconds of Life
- Left to Suffer
- Lorna Shore

=== M ===
- Make Them Suffer
- Malefice
- Maroon
- Mendeed
- Mental Cruelty
- Molotov Solution
- Mortal Treason
- Mud Factory

=== N ===
- A Night in Texas
- Nights Like These

=== O ===
- Oceano
- Ov Sulfur

=== P ===
- Paleface Swiss
- Prayer for Cleansing

=== R ===
- The Red Chord
- The Red Death
- The Red Shore
- Rings of Saturn

=== S ===
- Salt the Wound
- Saltwound
- See You Next Tuesday
- Shadow of Intent
- Showing Teeth
- Signs of the Swarm
- Slaughter to Prevail
- Suicide Silence
- Synestia

=== T ===
- Through the Eyes of the Dead
- Thy Art Is Murder
- To the Grave

=== U ===
- Underoath (early)
- Upon a Burning Body

=== V ===
- Veil of Maya (early)
- Vexed
- Voluntary Mortification
- Vulvodynia

=== W ===
- A Wake in Providence
- We Butter the Bread with Butter
- Whitechapel
- Winds of Plague
- Within Destruction
- Within the Ruins
- With Blood Comes Cleansing
- Worm Shepherd

== See also ==
- List of death metal bands
- List of metalcore bands
- List of hardcore punk bands
