= Imperium Delirium =

2025 studio album by American deathcore band Shadow of Intent

Studio album by Shadow of Intent
- Released: June 27, 2025
- Genre: Deathcore; symphonic death metal; melodic death metal
- Length: 54:36
- Producer: Chris Wiseman

Shadow of Intent chronology
Elegy (2022)	Imperium Delirium (2025)

Singles from Imperium Delirium
- 1. "Flying the Black Flag" Released: September 1, 2024; 2. "Feeding the Meatgrinder" Released: April 10, 2025; 3. "Infinity of Horrors" Released: May 16, 2025; 4. "Mechanical Chaos" Released: June 8, 2025; 5. "Imperium Delirium" Released: June 27, 2025

Professional ratings
Review scores
Source	Rating
Blabbermouth.net	9/10
Boolin Tunes	9/10
Distorted Sound	9/10

Imperium Delirium is the fifth studio album by American deathcore band Shadow of Intent. The album was released on June 27, 2025. It has spawned several singles including "Flying The Black Flag", "Feeding the Meatgrinder" (featuring George "Corpsegrinder" Fisher of Cannibal Corpse), "Infinity of Horrors", "Mechanical Chaos", and the title track.

The album was met with critical acclaim, showing "a more aggressive and polished sound" while simultaneously maintaining some of the melodic elements introduced in previous projects. Boolin Tunes has stated that the band brought back "many of the deathcore elements that have largely been absent from their sound since Reclaimer while managing to expand on their ever-maturing songwriting by blending a lot of these elements with the more death metal-adjacent elements that were omnipresent on Melancholy and Elegy."

== Track listing ==
All tracks are written by Shadow of Intent.

Imperium Delirium track listing
No.	Title	Length
1.	"Prepare to Die"	4:01
2.	"Flying the Black Flag"	3:57
3.	"Infinity of Horrors"	4:13
4.	"Mechanical Chaos"	3:51
5.	"They Murdered Sleep"	4:00
6.	"The Facets of Propaganda"	5:19
7.	"Feeding the Meatgrinder"	4:03
8.	"Vehement Draconian Vengeance"	3:55
9.	"Beholding the Sickness of Civilization"	4:30
10.	"Apocalypse Canvas (instrumental)"	5:08
11.	"No Matter the Cost"	4:16
12.	"Imperium Delirium"	7:34
Total length:		54:45

== Personnel ==
Credits adapted from the album's liner notes.

=== Shadow of Intent ===
- Ben Duerr – lead vocals, engineering
- Chris Wiseman – guitars, keyboards, vocals, production, engineering
- Bryce Butler – drums
- Andrew Monias – bass, vocals

=== Additional contributors ===
- Dave Otero – mixing, mastering
- Greg Thomas – drum engineering
- Chris Teti – drum engineering
- Francesco Ferrini – additional keyboards
- Blake Mullens – additional production on "Flying the Black Flag"
- George Fisher – additional vocals on "Feeding the Meatgrinder"
- Dan Seagrave – artwork
- Brutal Disorder Logos – layout
