= Opera (Fleshgod Apocalypse album) =

Studio album by Fleshgod Apocalypse
- Released: 23 August 2024
- Recorded: 2024
- Genre: Symphonic death metal; technical death metal
- Length: 43:10
- Label: Nuclear Blast
- Producer: Francesco Paoli; Francesco Ferrini

Fleshgod Apocalypse chronology
Veleno (2019)	Opera (2024)

Singles from Velena
- 1. "Pendulum" Released: 8 March 2024; 2. "Bloodclock" Released: 14 June 2024; 3. "I Can Never Die" Released: 19 July 2024

Professional ratings
Review scores
Source	Rating
Blabbermouth.net	8.5/10
MetalSucks	9/10

Opera is the sixth studio album by Italian symphonic death metal band Fleshgod Apocalypse. The album was released on 23 August 2024 through Nuclear Blast Records. It is their first album without founding bassist/clean vocalist Paolo Rossi who left the band following a year's absence, their first album to feature drummer Eugene Ryabchenko, as well as their first album since 2009's Oracles to feature no drumming from vocalist Francesco Paoli and the first one with Veronica Bordacchini as official member.

== Promotion ==
In March 2024, the band released the album's first single, "Pendulum". The song chronicles frontman Francesco Paoli's fall while mountain climbing in August 2021 that caused the band to go on hiatus. Two more singles followed; "Bloodclock" and "I Can Never Die".

== Touring ==
The band has done some touring in support of Opera from September to October 2024 in North America with bands Shadow of Intent, Ingested, The Zenith Passage, and Disembodied Tyrant, followed by a tour in January 2025 in Europe with bands Dark Funeral, Ex Deo, and Kami No Ikari.

== Track listing ==
All lyrics are written by Francesco Paoli; all music is composed by Francesco Paoli and Francesco Ferrini, except "Ode to Art (De' sepolcri)" and "Opera" by Paoli.

Opera track listing
No.	Title	Length
1.	"Ode to Art (De' sepolcri)"	2:18
2.	"I Can Never Die"	4:30
3.	"Pendulum"	3:58
4.	"Bloodclock"	5:14
5.	"At War with My Soul"	5:06
6.	"Morphine Waltz"	3:32
7.	"Matricide 8.21"	5:31
8.	"Per Aspera ad Astra"	4:48
9.	"Till Death Do Us Part"	5:31
10.	"Opera"	2:42

== Personnel ==
Fleshgod Apocalypse

- Francesco Paoli – lead vocals, bass, rhythm guitar
- Fabio Bartoletti – lead guitar
- Eugene Ryabchenko – drums
- Francesco Ferrini – piano, orchestral arrangements
- Veronica Bordacchini – soprano and clean vocals

Additional personnel

- Jacob Hansen – mixing, mastering
- Francesco Esposito – photography
- Felicita Fiorini – artwork
