= Primordial =

Primordial may refer to:

- Primordial era, an era after the Big Bang. See Chronology of the universe
- Primordial soup, hypothetical conditions under which life on Earth may have begun
- Primordial nuclide, nuclides, a few radioactive, that formed before the Earth existed and are stable enough to still occur on Earth
- Primordial elements, elements formed before the Earth came into existence
- Primordial narcissism, the psychological condition of prenatal existence
- Primordialism, the argument which contends that nations are ancient, natural phenomena
- Primordial (band), Irish black metal band
- Primordial (roller coaster), a roller coaster at Lagoon in Farmington, Utah
- Primordial (album), debut studio album by American deathcore band Shadow of Intent

== Religion and mythology ==
- Greek primordial deities, a group of Greek deities born in the beginning of our universe
- Adi-Buddha, also referred to as "primordial Buddha", a self-emanating, self-originating Buddha
- Primordial covenant, God's covenant with humanity in Islam

== See also ==
- Primal (disambiguation)
- Primeval (disambiguation)
- Primitive (disambiguation)
