= Elegy (Shadow of Intent album) =

Studio album by Shadow of Intent
- Released: January 14, 2022
- Genre: Deathcore; melodic death metal; symphonic metal
- Length: 60:26
- Label: Blood Blast Distribution
- Producer: Chris Wiseman

Shadow of Intent chronology
Melancholy (2019)	Elegy (2022)	Imperium Delirium (2025)

Singles from Elegy
- 1. "Intensified Genocide" Released: July 30, 2021; 2. "From Ruin... We Rise" Released: October 1, 2021; 3. "Where Millions Have Come to Die" Released: October 29, 2021; 4. "Of Fury" Released: January 18, 2022

Professional ratings
Review scores
Source	Rating
Boolin Tunes	9/10
Distorted Sound	8/10
Metal Injection	9/10
Metal Storm	8.5/10

Elegy is the fourth studio album by American deathcore band Shadow of Intent. The album was released on January 14, 2022 through Blood Blast Distribution. It is their first album with drummer Bryce Butler of Contrarian. The album was ultimately met with great critical acclaim. A deluxe edition of the album was released digitally on September 9, 2022. An orchestral version of the album titled Elegy: The Soundtrack was released on March 8, 2024.

The band has done some touring in support of the album. In October and November 2021, the band and Signs of the Swarm supported Born of Osiris in the Angel or Alien tour. In early 2022, Shadow of Intent toured the United States alongside Cannibal Corpse, Whitechapel, and Revocation.

== Track listing ==
Elegy track listing
No.	Title	Length
1.	"Farewell"	4:56
2.	"Saurian King"	5:24
3.	"The Coming Fire"	4:09
4.	"Of Fury"	4:47
5.	"Intensified Genocide"	4:00
6.	"Life of Exile"	4:53
7.	"Where Millions Have Come to Die"	4:22
8.	"From Ruin... We Rise"	4:50
9.	"Blood in the Sands of Time"	5:21
10.	"Reconquest (instrumental)"	4:50
11.	"Elegy": "I: Adapt"; "II: Devise"; "III: Overcome"	12:54: 2:28; 4:25; 6:01
Total length:		60:26

Bonus tracks
No.	Title	Length
12.	"Frozen Tomb"	4:59
13.	"Laid to Rest (Lamb of God cover)"	3:49
Total length:		69:14

== Personnel ==
=== Shadow of Intent ===
- Ben Duerr – lead vocals
- Chris Wiseman – guitars, backing vocals, producer, engineering
- Andrew Monias – bass
- Bryce Butler – drums, percussion

=== Guests ===
- Francesco Ferrini (Fleshgod Apocalypse) – keyboards, orchestration
- Phil Bozeman (Whitechapel) – vocals on "Where Millions Have Come to Die"
- Chuck Billy (Testament) – vocals on "Blood in the Sands of Time"

=== Staff ===
- Christian Donaldson – mixing, mastering
- Chris Klumpp – layout
- Pär Olofsson – cover art
