= Fuming Mouth =

American metal band

- Origin: Milford, Massachusetts
- Genres: Death metal, hardcore punk
- Years active: 2013–present
- Label: Nuclear Blast
- Members: Mark Whelan; Chris Berg; Patrick Merson; Jay Weinberg
- Website: fumingmouth.com

Fuming Mouth is an American death metal band from Milford, Massachusetts founded in 2013.

== History ==
=== Formation, The Grand Descent, and Beyond the Tomb ===
Formed in 2013, they released their first full length album, The Grand Descent, in June 2019 via Triple B Records.

In 2020, they signed to Nuclear Blast and released the EP Beyond the Tomb.

=== Mark Whelan's Cancer & Last day of Sun ===
In November 2021, it was revealed that vocalist Mark Whelan had been diagnosed with Acute Myeloid Leukemia (AML) and was receiving treatment. A GoFundMe was set up and received overwhelming support, reaching the initial goal in under 24 hours. In December 2021, a benefit show for Mark was held at the Middle East Nightclub with Vein.fm, Buried Dreams, Mizery, High Command, and Fleshwater. The show also featured a surprise Fuming Mouth set with Anthony DiDio of Vein taking over on vocals. Due to overwhelming demand, a second night was added the night prior at Ralph's Rock Diner.

In December 2022, the band made their return with Mark at the helm at America's Hardcore Fest at the Middle East Nightclub.

In April/May 2023 the band embarked on their first US tour since Mark's return supporting The Black Dahlia Murder alongside Terror, Frozen Soul, and Phobophilic.

Their second album, Last Day of Sun was dropped in November 2023, which was noted for its elements of hardcore in addition to their typical old school death metal sound. Much of the album was inspired by front man and guitarist Mark Whelan's battle with leukemia. In support of the album, the band embarked on a full US tour supporting Devil Master alongside Final Gasp.

On 3 August 2023, the band co-headlined Rampage Fest in Seoul alongside Kruelty.

In May 2024, the band did a brief string of dates supporting August Burns Red around both bands appearances at Welcome to Rockville & Sonic Temple Festival. On 2 May, the band released the single "Daylight Again" which included an unreleased B-side from their second album, as well as a reworked track from the album. On 4 September, the band released the single "Metal on Metal."

In February/March 2025, the band supported Suffocation on their 'Embrace the Suffering' European/UK tour alongside Angelmaker, Carcosa, and Melancolia.

== Members ==
=== Current ===
- Mark Whelan – vocals, guitar (2013–present)
- Jay Weinberg – drums (2026-present)
- Chris Berg – bass (2025-present)
- Patrick Merson - guitar (2025-present), bass (2023-2025)

=== Former ===
- Andrew Budwey - guitar (2016-2024)
- Dan Evans - bass
- Cayle Sain - drums
- Jimmy Davis - drums

== Discography ==
=== Albums ===
- The Grand Descent (2019)
- Last Day of Sun (2023)
- The Ringing Bell (2026)

=== EPs ===
- Demo (2013)
- Split w/ Gatlin (2014)
- Lotus (2016)
- Beyond the Tomb (2020)
- They Take What They Please / Devolve (2021)

=== Singles ===
- "Practitioner/Seismic Emasculation" (2016)
- "Sword and Scale" (2016)
- "Devolve " (2021)
- "Daylight Again" (2024)
- "Metal on Metal" (2024)
- "Cheat Death" (2026)
