= Melancholy (Shadow of Intent album) =

Studio album by Shadow of Intent
- Released: August 16, 2019
- Genre: Symphonic deathcore; blackened deathcore; melodic death metal; progressive death metal
- Length: 52:16
- Producer: Chris Wiseman

Shadow of Intent chronology
| Reclaimer (2017) | Melancholy (2019) | Elegy (2022) |

Singles from Melancholy
- 1. "Barren and Breathless Macrocosm" Released: June 14, 2019; 2. "Malediction" Released: July 26, 2019

Professional ratings
Review scores
| Source | Rating |
|---|---|
| Distorted Sound | 9/10 |
| MetalSucks | 10/10 |
| The Music | 8/10 |
| Sputnikmusic | 3/5 |

Melancholy is the third studio album by American deathcore band Shadow of Intent. The album was released on August 16, 2019. It is their first album with Andrew Monias on bass, and their only album with Anthony Barone on drums before he was replaced by Bryce Butler of Contrarian. Melancholy marked a departure from writing strictly Halo-themed music, instead being what has been described as a concept album depicting mass suicides orchestrated by a demonic goddess. An instrumental version of Melancholy was also released on November 22, 2019.

Francesco Ferrini of Fleshgod Apocalypse contributed to the orchestral work on this album. Christian Donaldson of Cryptopsy handled engineering duties. The cover artwork was made by Pär Olofsson, known for his work with Exodus, Immortal, and The Faceless.

Shadow of Intent supported the album with their first major headlining tour throughout the United States accompanied by Inferi, Signs of the Swarm, and Brand of Sacrifice. The tour lasted from January to February 2020.

== Track listing ==
Melancholy track listing
| No. | Title | Length |
|---|---|---|
| 1. | "Melancholy" | 5:15 |
| 2. | "Gravesinger" | 3:59 |
| 3. | "Barren and Breathless Macrocosm" | 4:57 |
| 4. | "Underneath a Sullen Moon" | 4:40 |
| 5. | "Oudenophobia" | 4:10 |
| 6. | "Embracing Nocturnal Damnation" | 4:21 |
| 7. | "Dirge of the Void" | 3:18 |
| 8. | "Chthonic Odyssey" | 5:24 |
| 9. | "The Dreaded Mystic Abyss (instrumental)" | 10:26 |
| 10. | "Malediction" | 5:42 |
| Total length: | | 52:16 |

== Personnel ==
=== Shadow of Intent ===
- Ben Duerr – lead vocals
- Chris Wiseman – guitars, backing vocals
- Andrew Monias – bass
- Anthony Barone – drums, percussion

=== Guests ===
- Francesco Ferrini (Fleshgod Apocalypse) – orchestration
- Trevor Strnad (ex-The Black Dahlia Murder) – vocals on "Barren and Breathless Macrocosm"

=== Production ===
- Chris Wiseman – production, engineering
- Christian Donaldson – engineering, mixing, mastering
- Brutal Disorder Designs – logo, layout
- Pär Olofsson – cover art
