= Veleno (Fleshgod Apocalypse album) =

Studio album by Fleshgod Apocalypse
- Released: 24 May 2019
- Genre: Symphonic death metal, technical death metal
- Length: 51:50
- Label: Nuclear Blast
- Producer: Jacob Hansen

Fleshgod Apocalypse chronology
King (2016)	Veleno (2019)	Opera (2024)

Singles from Veleno
- 1. "Sugar" Released: 10 March 2019

Professional ratings
Review scores
Source	Rating
Distorted Sound	9/10
Exclaim!	5/10
Hysteria Magazine	9/10
Proghurst	10/10
Sputnikmusic	4/5
Wall of Sound	3/5

Veleno (Italian for "Venom") is the fifth studio album by Italian symphonic death metal band Fleshgod Apocalypse. The album was released on 24 May 2019 through Nuclear Blast Records.

It is the band's first album since 2009's Oracles to feature Francesco Paoli as lead vocalist and rhythm guitarist, the first album to feature Fabio Bartoletti on lead guitar, the only album to feature David Folchitto on drums, and the last album to feature founding bassist Paolo Rossi before his departure in 2024.

== Touring ==
The band had done some touring in support of Veleno from March to April 2019 in North America, and from October to November 2019 in Australia. The band was planning on doing another North American tour from March to April 2020, with The Agonist as special guests, but it was cancelled due to the COVID-19 pandemic.

== Track listing ==
All lyrics are written by Francesco Paoli; all music is composed by Francesco Paoli and Francesco Ferrini.

Veleno track listing
No.	Title	Length
1.	"Fury"	4:38
2.	"Carnivorous Lamb"	4:43
3.	"Sugar"	4:17
4.	"The Praying Mantis' Strategy"	1:04
5.	"Monnalisa"	5:24
6.	"Worship and Forget"	4:32
7.	"Absinthe"	6:13
8.	"Pissing on the Score"	4:30
9.	"The Day We'll Be Gone"	5:58
10.	"Embrace the Oblivion"	7:49
11.	"Veleno"	2:42

== Personnel ==
Fleshgod Apocalypse

- Francesco Paoli – lead vocals, rhythm guitar, additional drums
- Francesco Ferrini – piano, orchestral arrangements
- Paolo Rossi – bass guitar, clean vocals

Additional personnel

- David Folchitto – drums
- Fabio Bartoletti – lead guitar
- Veronica Bordacchini – soprano vocals
- Gino Ven Makes – logo
- Jacob Hansen – mixing, mastering
- Marco Mastrobuono – recording
- Travis Smith – artwork
