= Shadow of Intent =

American deathcore band

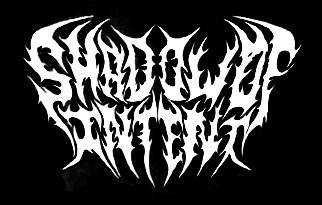
- Logo of the band in their first two albums

Background information
- Origin: Hartford, Connecticut, U.S.
- Genres: Deathcore; symphonic metal; melodic death metal; technical death metal
- Years active: 2013–present
- Label: Blood Blast Distribution
- Members: Ben Duerr; Chris Wiseman; Andrew Monias; Bryce Butler
- Past members: Federico Zuccarelli; Matt Kohanowski; Keith Kohlhepp; Anthony Barone
- Website: shadowofintent.com

Shadow of Intent is an American deathcore band from Connecticut. They formed in 2013 as a Halo-themed studio project by Ben Duerr and Chris Wiseman. They are not signed to a label and have released all their albums independently, except Elegy which was released through Blood Blast Distribution. The band currently consists of Ben Duerr, Chris Wiseman, Bryce Butler and Andrew Monias. They have released five studio albums to date, along with two instrumental versions of previous releases, and a deluxe album. Their fifth studio album, Imperium Delirium, was released on June 27, 2025.

== History ==
=== Formation (2013) ===
Shadow of Intent was formed in 2013 in Connecticut by vocalist Ben Duerr and guitarist Chris Wiseman. They met playing in separate bands at a local concert. The group was initially formed as a studio project. They were inspired by Halo and the name "Shadow of Intent" came from a ship in the game series bearing the same name. Duerr describes himself as a Halo nerd and stated that their music follows the storyline of the Halo novels.

=== Inferi Sententia and Primordial (2014–2016) ===
The group released their EP Inferi Sententia on July 18, 2014, and debut album Primordial on January 10, 2016. The tracks on both albums were produced via homemade recordings. All of the tracks on Inferi Sententia were re-recorded and featured on Primordial. The drum tracks are programmed on both releases. Keyboard and orchestral samples are also present on these releases.

Duerr was responsible solely for writing and performing the lead vocals during the production process while Wiseman was responsible for all of the remaining songwriting.

=== New members, Reclaimer, and The Instrumentals (2016–2017) ===
On September 19, 2016, they announced the addition of Matt Kohanowski on drums, marking the end of the group's time as a two-man project. On March 31, 2017, they announced the addition of new members Federico Zuccarelli on guitar and Keith Kohlhepp on bass. This brought the total members of the group to five.

On April 28, 2017, Shadow of Intent released Reclaimer, their first album without programmed drum tracks and the first album to feature a unique player on each instrument.

The band released The Instrumentals on October 20, 2017. The album contained instrumental versions of all of the songs from both of the preceding albums.

=== Melancholy and Elegy (2018–2025) ===
On March 30, 2018, they released their first single 'Underneath a Sullen Moon'. This was the first track which was not Halo-themed and their second released track which did not begin with the word 'The'. The band went on their first major tour in the spring of 2018 supporting Carnifex on their Chaos & Carnage tour headliner. Oceano, Winds of Plague, Archspire, Spite, Widowmaker and Buried Above Ground accompanied Shadow of Intent on this tour. In the summer of 2018, the band toured alongside Whitechapel, The Black Dahlia Murder, Fleshgod Apocalypse, and Aversions Crown.

On December 14, 2018, the group announced that Anthony Barone (ex-A Night in Texas) would be joining the group as their drummer.

On August 16, 2019, Shadow of Intent released Melancholy which included a remastered version of the aforementioned single as one of the tracks on the album. Francesco Ferrini of Fleshgod Apocalypse contributed to the orchestral work on this album. Melancholy has been described as a concept album depicting mass suicides orchestrated by a demonic goddess. This album marked a departure from writing strictly Halo-themed music. An instrumental version of Melancholy was also released on November 22, 2019.

In the winter of 2020, the band performed on their first major headlining tour throughout the United States accompanied by Inferi, Signs of the Swarm, and Brand of Sacrifice.

In 2020, the group announced they were parting ways with Anthony Barone and that Bryce Butler (Contrarian) would be replacing him.

In October 2021, The band announced their fourth studio album, Elegy, for a January 2022 release, which was ultimately met with great critical acclaim. A deluxe edition of the album was released digitally on September 9, 2022, featuring a B-side track titled 'Frozen Tomb' and a cover of Lamb of God's 'Laid to Rest'.

In the winter of 2022, the band toured the United States alongside Cannibal Corpse, Whitechapel, and Revocation.

On March 30, 2023, the band released a new single titled 'The Migrant' which showed a return to writing Halo-themed songs. Another new single titled 'Flying The Black Flag' would be released on August 30, 2024.

The band has done some touring from September to October 2024 in North America with bands Fleshgod Apocalypse, Ingested, The Zenith Passage, and Disembodied Tyrant. They also toured with Cattle Decapitation, Revocation and Vulvodynia in Europe in early 2025.

=== Imperium Delirium (2025–present) ===
The band released their fifth studio album titled Imperium Delirium on June 27, 2025. The band would go on tour with Lorna Shore, however vocalist Ben Duerr needed to sit out of the tour as he awaits the birth of his child. Bassist Andrew Monias and ex-A Wake in Providence vocalist, Adam Mercer would handle vocal duties on the tour. Duerr would later return for the band's American tour with Synestia, Mental Cruelty, and AngelMaker.

== Musical style and influences ==
Shadow of Intent's musical style has often been referred to deathcore, symphonic deathcore, melodic deathcore, and technical deathcore, and has been compared to Fleshgod Apocalypse, Ovid's Withering, and Dimmu Borgir. Their sound is often blended with blackened death metal, melodic death metal, symphonic metal, technical death metal, progressive death metal, and symphonic death metal.

== Band members ==
Current

- Ben Duerr – lead vocals (2013–present) (also in Hollow Prophet)
- Chris Wiseman – guitars, backing vocals, programming, clean vocals (2013–present) (also in Currents)
- Andrew Monias – bass, backing vocals (2018–present), lead vocals (live 2025)
- Bryce Butler – drums (2020–present)

Former

- Federico Zuccarelli – guitars (2017)
- Matt Kohanowski – drums (2016–2018)
- Keith Kohlhepp – bass (2017–2018)
- Anthony Barone – drums (2018–2020)

Live

- Adam Mercer – lead vocals (2025)

== Discography ==
Studio albums

List of studio albums, with selected chart positions
| Year | Album details | Peak chart positions | | | |
| Year | Album details | US Sales | US Ind. | US Hard Rock | US Heat. |
|---|---|---|---|---|---|
| 2016 | Primordial: Released: January 10, 2016; Label: Self-released; Format: CD, LP, digital | — | — | — | — |
| 2017 | Reclaimer: Released: April 28, 2017; Label: Self-released; Format: CD, LP, digital | — | — | — | — |
| 2019 | Melancholy: Released: August 16, 2019; Label: Self-released; Format: CD, LP, digital | 73 | 17 | 7 | 2 |
| 2022 | Elegy: Released: January 14, 2022; Label: Self-released; Format: CD, LP, digital | — | — | — | — |
| 2025 | Imperium Delirium: Released: June 27, 2025; Label: Self-released; Format: CD, LP, digital | — | — | — | — |
"—" denotes releases that did not chart or were not released in that country.

Instrumental album versions

- The Instrumentals (instrumental versions of Primordial and Reclaimer) (2017)
- Melancholy (Instrumentals) (2019)

EPs

- Inferi Sententia (July 18, 2014)

Singles

- "Underneath a Sullen Moon" (March 30, 2018)
- "Intensified Genocide" (July 30, 2021)
- "The Migrant" (March 30, 2023)
- "Flying The Black Flag" (August 30, 2024)
