= Prime Evil =

Prime Evil may refer to:

- Prime Evil (album), by Venom, 1989
- Prime Evil (EP), by Raymond Watts, 1997
- Prime Evil (anthology), a 1988 anthology of horror short stories
- Prime Evil (Buffy novel), a 2000 Buffy the Vampire Slayer novel
- Prime Evil, the primary villain in the animated series Ghostbusters
- Eugene de Kock (born 1949), nicknamed Prime Evil, South African former police colonel and assassin

== See also ==
- Primeval (disambiguation)
