= ESP M-II =

Guitar model

- Manufacturer: ESP
- Period: unknown

Construction
- Body type: Solid
- Neck joint: Neck-thru or Bolt-on

Woods
- Body: Alder
- Neck: 3-piece Maple
- Fretboard: Ebony, Rosewood or Maple

Hardware
- Bridge: Floyd Rose Original Bridge
- Pickup(s): 2 EMG 81 or Seymour Duncan JB (bridge) and '59 (neck)

Colors available
- Black, Urban Camo

ESP M-II is a guitar model offered by ESP. It belongs to the category of guitars referred to colloquially as "Super Strats," which refers to any guitar (regardless of brand or model) drawing heavily upon the Fender Stratocaster design. Modifications to the original Stratocaster design usually enhance playability. For example, the M-II features a larger lower-body rout to assist with accessing higher frets. The vast majority of "Super Strats" are equipped with Floyd Rose type locking-vibratos which assist with tuning stability under extreme string-bending.

The ESP M-II is produced in Japan and is currently available in three configurations; the first two feature bolt-on necks:

- A maple fretboard and a Seymour Duncan JB in the bridge position and a Seymour Duncan 59 in the neck position.
- A rosewood fretboard and two EMG 81 active pickups.
- A neck-through body neck joint, rosewood fretboard and two EMG 81 active pickups.

Not initially available in America for a while, the "M-1" model has only one pickup and a tune-o-matic Gibson style bridge. The only color available Stateside for the M-II is Gloss Black, although in the past and overseas a wider selection is available.

The most famous user of the M-II is probably Metallica's Kirk Hammett, who has used an M-II from the 1980s era of Metallica to this day, including his custom KH models. The latter differ from standard M-IIs in that they feature Hammett's signature inlays, art, separate volume controls, a tone control, and a flatter fretboard radius (~12" for the standard and ~16" for the KH-2). His two most well-known guitars are M-IIs, which he has named "the Mummy" and the "Ouija" due to their distinctive graphics. The artwork featured on the "Mummy-II" has been copyrighted.

Other noted users of the ESP M-II are:

- Jeff Hanneman
- Craig Goldy of Dio
- Criss Oliva of Savatage
- Michael Romeo of Symphony X
- Timo Tolkki of Stratovarius
- Buckethead
- Kirk Hammett of Metallica
- Jim Tasikas of Contrarian
- Elias Viljanen of Sonata Arctica
- Haruka Kudō of Roselia
- Jason Mendonca of Akercocke

== Finishes ==
Urban Camouflage: Introduced with the 2005 catalog, the satin finish Urban Camo M-II includes neck-thru construction; 25.5” scale; alder body; 3-piece maple neck; ebony fingerboard with 12" radius; abalone dot inlays w/ESP at 12th fret; dual EMG 81 active pickups; a single volume control w/3-way toggle pickup selector; black hardware; Deluxe Gotoh tuners; Original Floyd Rose bridge; white binding on neck & headstock; and 24 extra jumbo frets. Unlike most 2005 M-II's, the headstock on this guitar is not reversed. In later years, the headstock would be reversed, the hardware was later changed from black to black nickel (2008), the fingerboard changed from ebony to rosewood and the binding was excluded (2014).
