= Primitive =

Primitive may refer to:

== Mathematics ==
- Primitive element (field theory)
- Primitive element (finite field)
- Primitive cell (crystallography)
- Primitive notion, axiomatic systems
- Primitive polynomial (disambiguation), one of two concepts
- Primitive function or antiderivative, F′ = f
- Primitive permutation group
- Primitive root of unity; See Root of unity
- Primitive triangle, an integer triangle whose sides have no common prime factor

== Sciences ==
- Primitive (phylogenetics), characteristic of an early stage of development or evolution
- Primitive equations, a set of nonlinear differential equations that are used to approximate atmospheric flow
- Primitive change, a general term encompassing a number of basic molecular alterations in the course of a chemical reaction

== Computing ==
- Cryptographic primitives, low-level cryptographic algorithms frequently used to build computer security systems
- Geometric primitive, the simplest kinds of figures in computer graphics
- Language primitive, the simplest element provided by a programming language
- Primitive data type, a datatype provided by a programming language

== Art and entertainment ==
- Naïve art, created by untrained artists
- Neo-primitivism, an early 20th-century Russian art movement that looks to early human history, folk art and non-Western or children's art for inspiration
- Primitivism, an early 20th-century art movement that looks to early human history, folk art and non-Western or children's art for inspiration
- Primitive decorating, a style of decorating using primitive folk art style that is characteristic of a historic or early Americana time period
- Primitive, a novel by J. F. Gonzalez

=== Music ===
- The Primitives, a British indie rock band

==== Albums ====
- Primitive (Neil Diamond album), by Neil Diamond 1984
- Primitive (Soulfly album), by Soulfly 2000

==== Songs ====
- "Primitive", by Accept from the 1996 album Predator
- "Primitive", by The Groupies, later covered by The Cramps on the 1981 album Psychedelic Jungle
- "Primitive", by Killing Joke from the 1980 album Killing Joke
- "Primitive", by Cyndi Lauper from A Night to Remember
- "Primitive", by Annie Lennox from the 1992 album Diva
- "Primitive", by Róisín Murphy from the 2007 album Overpowered

== Religion ==
- Primitive Church, another name for early Christianity
- Restorationism, also described as Christian primitivism, is the belief that Christianity should be restored along the lines of what is known about the apostolic early church
- Primitive Baptist, a religious movement seeking to retain or restore early Christian practices
- Primitive Methodism

== Other uses ==
- Primitive (philately)
- Anarcho-primitivism, an anarchist critique of the origins and progress of civilization
- Noble savage, a particular stock character in literature, i.e., a person uncorrupted by the influences of civilization
- Pre-industrial society
- Primitive communism, a pre-agrarian form of communism according to Karl Marx and Friedrich Engels
- Primitive Culture, an 1871 book by Edward Burnett Tylor.
- Primitive Skateboarding, a company located in Los Angeles

== See also ==
- Primeval (disambiguation)
- Primitive Man (disambiguation)
- Primordial (disambiguation)
