= Primitive Man =

Primitive man may refer to:

- Archaic humans
- the caveman stock character
- the noble savage stock character
- Primitive culture

as proper name:

- Primitive Man (album), a 1982 album by Icehouse
- Primitive Man (band), an American sludge metal band

They also refer to First people

== See also ==
- The Mind of Primitive Man, a 1911 anthropology work by Franz Boas
- A Primitive Man's Career to Civilization, a 1912 UK film directed and written by Cherry Kearton
- Primitive Man (journal), a peer-reviewed journal of anthropology
- Primitive (disambiguation)
- Prehistoric man (disambiguation)
- Human evolution
- Homo
- Primitivism
