= Agony (Fleshgod Apocalypse album) =

Studio album by Fleshgod Apocalypse
- Released: August 9, 2011
- Genre: Symphonic death metal, technical death metal
- Length: 49:26
- Label: Nuclear Blast
- Producer: Stefano "Saul" Morabito

Fleshgod Apocalypse chronology
Mafia (2010)	Agony (2011)	Labyrinth (2013)

Agony is the second studio album by Italian symphonic death metal band Fleshgod Apocalypse.

On July 18, 2011, Fleshgod Apocalypse released a music video for "The Violation". On December 22, 2012, Fleshgod Apocalypse released a music video for "The Forsaking".

== Reception ==
Professional ratings
Review scores
Source	Rating
The NewReview	3/5 stars
Metal Underground.com	4/5 stars

Max Lussier of The NewReview said that Agony "is a very different album than its predecessors". While he praised the speed of the songs and the guitar and drum work, he thought that the orchestral parts were "too large a part of the album's sound", resulting in "the guitar playing [becoming] slightly muddled and lost in the shuffle".

== Track listing ==
No.	Title	Length
1.	"Temptation"	1:47
2.	"The Hypocrisy"	5:31
3.	"The Imposition"	4:58
4.	"The Deceit"	6:03
5.	"The Violation"	4:19
6.	"The Egoism"	6:22
7.	"The Betrayal"	5:31
8.	"The Forsaking"	5:37
9.	"The Oppression"	6:04
10.	"Agony"	3:34
Total length:		53:49

iTunes bonus track
No.	Title	Length
11.	"Heartwork" (Carcass cover)	4:23

== Chart performance ==
Chart (2011)	Peak position
Billboard Top Hotseekers	18

== Personnel ==
Fleshgod Apocalypse

- Tommaso Riccardi – lead vocals, rhythm guitar
- Cristiano Trionfera – lead guitar, backing vocals
- Paolo Rossi – bass, clean vocals
- Francesco Paoli – drums, additional guitars
- Francesco Ferrini – pianos, orchestral samples
