= King (Fleshgod Apocalypse album) =

Studio album by Fleshgod Apocalypse
- Released: February 5, 2016
- Recorded: Kick Recording and 16th Cellar Studios, Rome in September–October 2015
- Genre: Symphonic death metal, technical death metal
- Length: 57:29
- Label: Nuclear Blast Records
- Producer: Jens Bogren at Fascination Street Studio, Sweden in November 2015

Fleshgod Apocalypse chronology
| Labyrinth (2013) | King (2016) | Veleno (2019) |

Singles from King
- 1. "The Fool" Released: January 1, 2016

Professional ratings
Review scores
| Source | Rating |
|---|---|
| About.com | 3.5/5 stars |
| Exclaim! | 7/10 |
| Metal Hammer | 6/10 |
| MetalSucks | 4/5 stars |
| The National Student | 5/5 stars |

King is the fourth studio album by Italian symphonic death metal band Fleshgod Apocalypse. The album was released on February 5, 2016 through Nuclear Blast Records. The album was mixed and mastered at Fascination Street Studio in Örebro, Sweden. King is the last album to be released featuring Tommaso Riccardi on vocals and guitar before his departure in October 2017, as well as the last album to feature founding lead guitarist Cristiano Trionfera who departed at an unknown date in 2017 with no announcement.

== Concept ==
The King in this album represents the brave part of ourselves: the one we should cultivate to become strong and rise again from this Dark Age. He’s the only positive figure of this story—a man who has integrity and love for the values and truth that we all should hope for ourselves. All the other characters in the court represent the fears that can lead us to make everything worse. They try to affect the King’s decisions for their own advantage and hope for a loss of power, regardless of the suffering they’re going to create for their own world and people. As we already said when we presented King to our fans, we should all hail the King who lives inside every one of us.

— Tommaso Riccardi, "Decibel Magazine"

== Production ==
Due to the high cost of using a live symphonic orchestra, the orchestral sounds for the album were produced using software instruments.

== Track listing ==
All lyrics are written by Tommaso Riccardi and Paolo Rossi except where noted; all music is composed by Francesco Paoli and Francesco Ferrini except where noted.

| No. | Title | Length |
|---|---|---|
| 1. | "Marche Royale" | 1:58 |
| 2. | "In Aeternum" | 5:26 |
| 3. | "Healing Through War" (Speech from 'De Bello Gallico' by Julius Caesar) | 4:43 |
| 4. | "The Fool" | 4:06 |
| 5. | "Cold as Perfection" (Additional speaking by Nate Kantner) | 6:31 |
| 6. | "Mitra" (Additional speaking by Nate Kantner) | 3:49 |
| 7. | "Paramour (Die Leidenschaft bringt Leiden)" (Lyrics taken from 'Trilogie der Leidenschaft' by Johann Wolfgang Von Goethe) | 3:43 |
| 8. | "And the Vulture Beholds" | 5:13 |
| 9. | "Gravity" | 5:12 |
| 10. | "A Million Deaths" | 5:27 |
| 11. | "Syphilis" | 7:22 |
| 12. | "King" (Written by Francesco Ferrini) | 3:59 |

Digipak bonus disc
| No. | Title | Length |
|---|---|---|
| 1. | "Marche Royale" (Orchestral version) | 1:58 |
| 2. | "In Aeternum" (Orchestral version) | 5:26 |
| 3. | "Healing Through War" (Orchestral version) | 4:43 |
| 4. | "The Fool" (Orchestral version) | 4:06 |
| 5. | "Cold as Perfection" (Orchestral version) | 6:31 |
| 6. | "Mitra" (Orchestral version) | 3:49 |
| 7. | "And the Vulture Beholds" (Orchestral version) | 5:13 |
| 8. | "Gravity" (Orchestral version) | 5:12 |
| 9. | "A Million Deaths" (Orchestral version) | 5:27 |
| 10. | "Syphilis" (Orchestral version) | 7:22 |

== Personnel ==
Fleshgod Apocalypse

- Tommaso Riccardi – lead vocals, rhythm guitar
- Cristiano Trionfera – lead guitar
- Paolo Rossi – bass, clean vocals
- Francesco Paoli – drums, backing vocals, additional guitars
- Francesco Ferrini – piano, orchestral arrangements

Additional personnel

- Veronica Bordacchini – soprano vocals (Tracks 5, 7, 11)
- Gino Ven Makes – logo
- Jens Bogren – mixing, mastering
- Marco Mastrobuono – engineering, co-production
- Eliran Kantor – artwork

== Charts ==
| Chart (2016) | Peak position |
|---|---|
| Belgian Albums (Ultratop Flanders) | 180 |
| Belgian Albums (Ultratop Wallonia) | 196 |
