= Jim Tasikas =

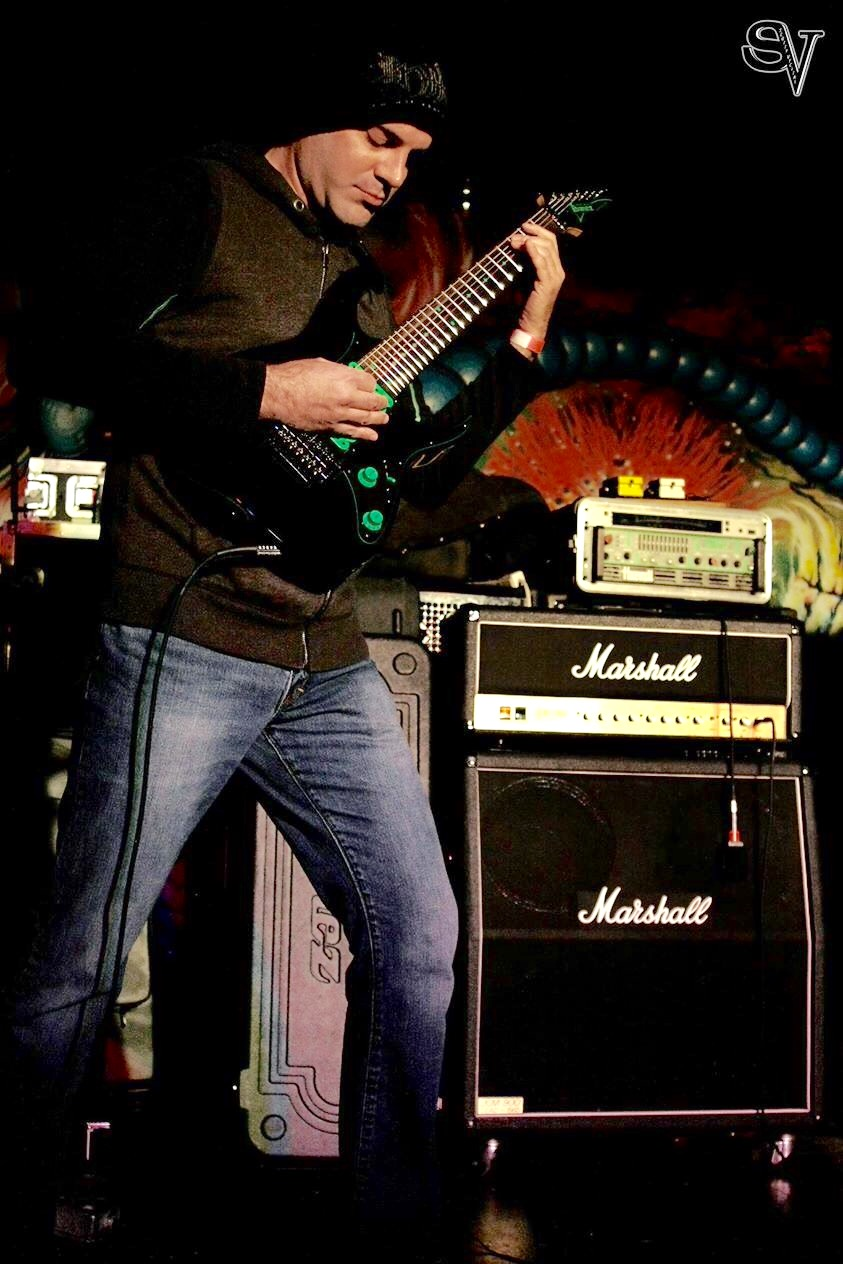

Background information
- Born: Dimitrios Jim Tasikas; March 19, 1975 (age 51); Rochester, New York, U.S.
- Genres: Heavy metal; progressive metal; death metal
- Occupations: Musician, songwriter
- Instruments: Guitars, Keyboards
- Years active: 1996–present
- Label: Willowtip
- Website: contrarianofficial.com

Dimitrios Jim Tasikas (born March 19, 1975) is a Greek-American guitarist and founder of the Rochester-based progressive metal band Contrarian.

== Early life ==
Tasikas is a Greek citizen, he holds dual citizenship with the United States and Greece. His father and mother are Greek immigrants who moved to the U.S. from Florina, Greece.

== Career ==
Tasikas is the primary songwriter and performs a number of different roles in Contrarian. These include complex guitar parts, keyboards and occasional lead guitar. He shares guitar duties with Brian Mason, playing mainly technical rhythm sections. Tasikas is also known for his extensive guitar collection which has been featured in Decibel Magazine. As of September 2020, Tasikas has been endorsed by ESP guitars and primarily uses their M Series guitars.

=== Death By Metal Assistant Producer ===
Tasikas is credited as co-producer in the documentary Death By Metal which focuses on life and career of musician Chuck Schuldiner.

=== Guitars ===
- ESP M-III DXM Natural 6-string guitar Japan
- ESP M-II DXM Orange Burst 6-string guitar Japan
- ESP LTD M-I Custom ‘87 Black 6-string guitar
- Charvel San Dimas Style 1 Trans Gold USA
- ESP USA M-7 FR Flamed Maple - See Thru Black Cherry Sunburst 7-String Guitar

=== Amplification ===
- Laney IRT120H Ironheart Guitar Amplifier Head, 120 Watts
- Friedman BE-100 Deluxe 3-channel 100-watt Tube Head

== Discography ==
=== Manic ===
- Recollection of What Never Was (1996) - guitar/keyboards

=== Delirium Endeavor ===
- Flight of the Imagination(1998) - guitar
- Twelve Cusp(2004) - guitar

=== Contrarian ===
- Predestined (2014)
- Polemic (2015)
- To Perceive Is to Suffer (2017)
- Their Worm Never Dies (2019)
- Only Time Will Tell (2020)
- Sage Of Shekhinah (2023)
