= Vulvodynia (band) =

South African deathcore band

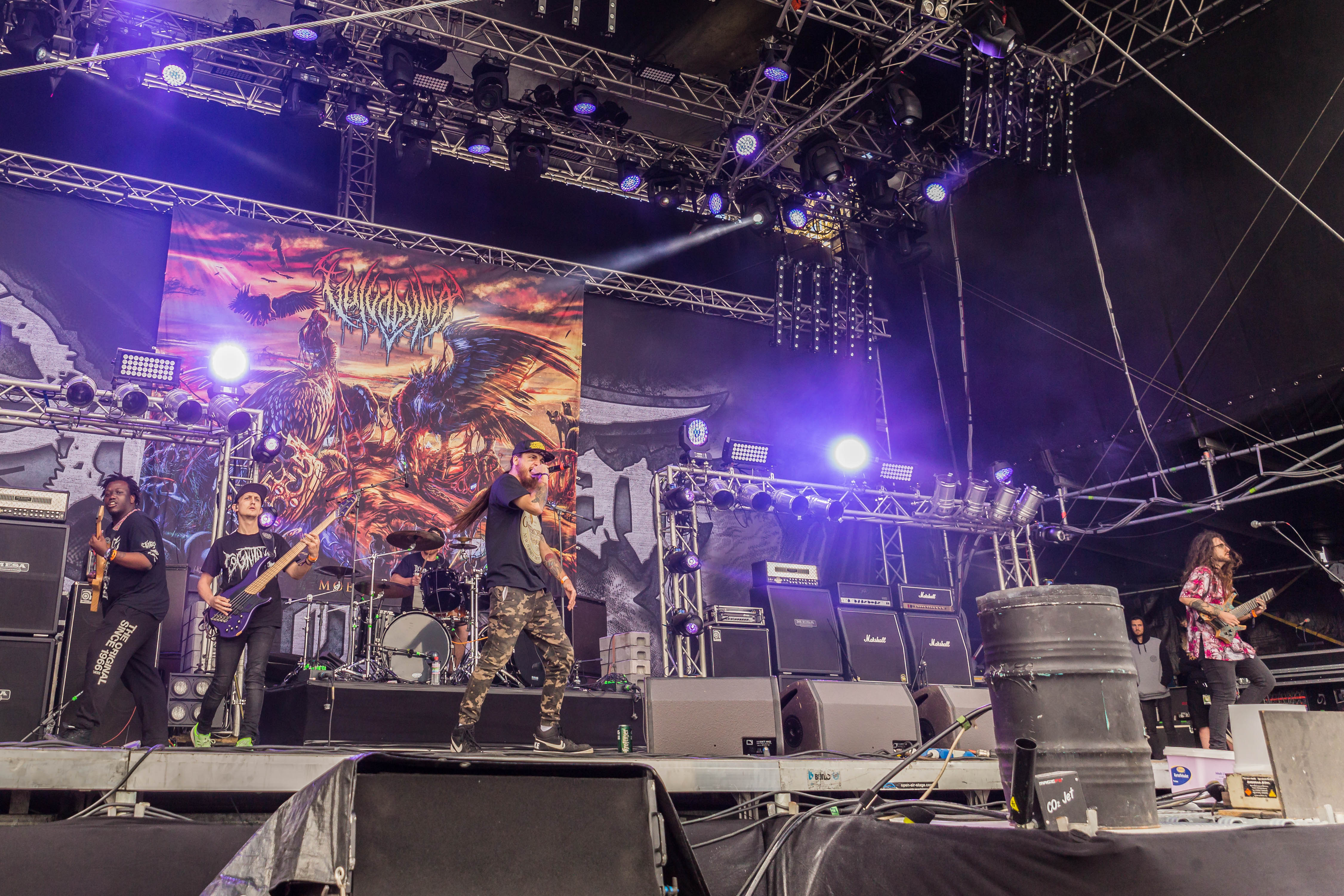
- Vulvodynia live at Party.San Open Air in 2019

Background information
- Origin: Durban, KwaZulu-Natal, South Africa
- Genres: Deathcore; brutal death metal; technical death metal
- Years active: 2014–present
- Labels: Unique Leader; Lacerated Enemy; Vicious Instinct
- Members: Luke Haarhoff; Lwandile Prusent; Kris Xenopoulos; Thomas Hughes; Nate Gilbert; Maya Pobst
- Past members: Matt Mader; Byron Dunwoody; Chris van der Walt; Duncan Bentley; Zion Bittenbender
- Website: vulvodyniaband.com

Vulvodynia is a South African deathcore band formed in 2014 in Durban, KwaZulu-Natal. The band's lineup currently consists of vocalist Maya Pobst, guitarists Lwandile Prusent, Luke Haarhoff and Kris Xenopoulos, bassist Nate Gilbert and drummer Thomas Hughes. The band have currently released five studio albums with their latest being Entabeni released on July 5, 2024, through Unique Leader Records. They have also released three EPs and three split EPs. They are currently signed to Unique Leader Records.

== History ==
Vulvodynia was formed in early 2014 by a 16-year old Luke Haarhoff and a 19-year old Duncan Bentley. The band released their debut EP titled Lord of Plagues in May 2014. The EP was produced by Byron Dunwoody who would join the band as their second guitarist shortly after the EP was released. In August 2014, the band signed to the Australian label Vicious Instinct Records and released their debut album titled Cognizant Castigation in October 2014. In December 2014, the band released a split EP with Cunt Cuntly, Before the Harvest, Cerebus, Bationmaster and The Cake Is a Lie titled Slashing Through the Snow. In 2015, the band got together a full lineup to begin touring. The band would also release their second EP titled Finis Omnium Ignorantiam and another split titled Astral Evisceration on All Hallows Eve with Cunt Cuntly, Before the Harvest, The Overmind, Chamber of Malice, Despondent, Become The Watcher and Existence Has Failed that same year.

The band released their second studio album titled Psychosadistic Design on June 30, 2016, through Czech label Lacerated Enemy Records. The album features re-recorded tracks from the Lord of Plagues EP. The band would tour with Despised Icon, Malevolence and Archspire in February 2018 in Europe and the UK. On April 30, 2019, the band released a single titled "Mob Justice" which would appear on their Anthropophagus EP (which was released on May 17, 2019) and their Mob Justice album (which was released on June 30, 2019). The Mob Justice album is about life, the socio-political climate and brutality in Africa. In late 2019, the band would headline their first tour in Australia and New Zealand.

On January 16, 2021, the band released a music video for the song "The Disconnect" which would appear on a split EP titled Societal Lobotomisation with London-based deathcore band, Acrania. On May 11, 2021, the band announced that they have signed to Unique Leader Records and released a single titled "The Shadowy Descent of Gaia" and announced their fourth studio album, Praenuntius Infiniti, which was released on September 17, 2021. This was then followed by three more singles titled "Eternal Wasteland of Galaxies" (released on June 22, 2021), "Banquet of Enigmatic Horrors Pt. I: Terror" (released on July 9, 2021) and "Banquet of Enigmatic Horrors II: Agony" (released on August 20, 2021, and features guest vocals from Archspire vocalist Oliver Rae Aleron). On October 27, 2022, the band released a standalone single titled "Artificial Divinity". In memory of the late Trevor Strnad of The Black Dahlia Murder, the band released a single titled "Eulogy Of Ashes" on April 14, 2023. The single showed influence from melodic death metal, similar to The Black Dahlia Murder.

On May 7, 2023, the band fired vocalist Duncan Bentley after he allegedly tried to kill their drummer Thomas Hughes. On July 12, 2023, the band announced that guitarist Lwandile Prusent (who began touring with the band in 2018 and became a full-time member in 2020 after he began writing material for the band) would be handling vocal duties. The band took part in the 'Suffer Forever' tour in mid-2023 in North America with Angelmaker, Falsifier, Carcosa and A Wake in Providence. On May 9, 2024, the band unveiled the title-track of their fifth studio album Entabeni, which was released on July 5, 2024. The song also features guest vocals from PeelingFlesh vocalist Damonteal Harris. The second single from the album titled "Adamaster" was released on June 13, 2024, and features guest vocals from Bodysnatcher vocalist Kyle Medina. The band toured with Cattle Decapitation, Shadow of Intent and Revocation in Europe in early 2025.

On October 30, 2025, the band announced that Lwandile Prusent had stepped down as vocalist and returned to his original role as a guitarist and that Zion Bittenbender had joined the band as their new vocalist. However, Bittenbender would be accused of sexual misconduct shortly after his introduction to the band. Bittenbender would sit out of the band's tour in Asia in order to focus on addressing the matters through the appropriate legal channels. Lwandile Prusent would go back to doing vocals for the remainder of the band's tour. On March 3, 2026, the band announced they had parted ways with Bittenbender and were searching for a new vocalist. On July 24, 2026, the band announced the addition of their new vocalist Maya Pobst. The band's first single with Pobst titled "Twin Tyrants" was released on September 8, 2026.

== Band name ==
In an interview with Revolver magazine, ex-vocalist Duncan Bentley explained that when the band started, they wanted to pick out a name with as much shock value as possible. They decided to name the band Vulvodynia after discovering the meaning behind the word while browsing through online gynecology textbooks.

== Band members ==
Vulvodynia live at Party.San Metal Open Air 2019

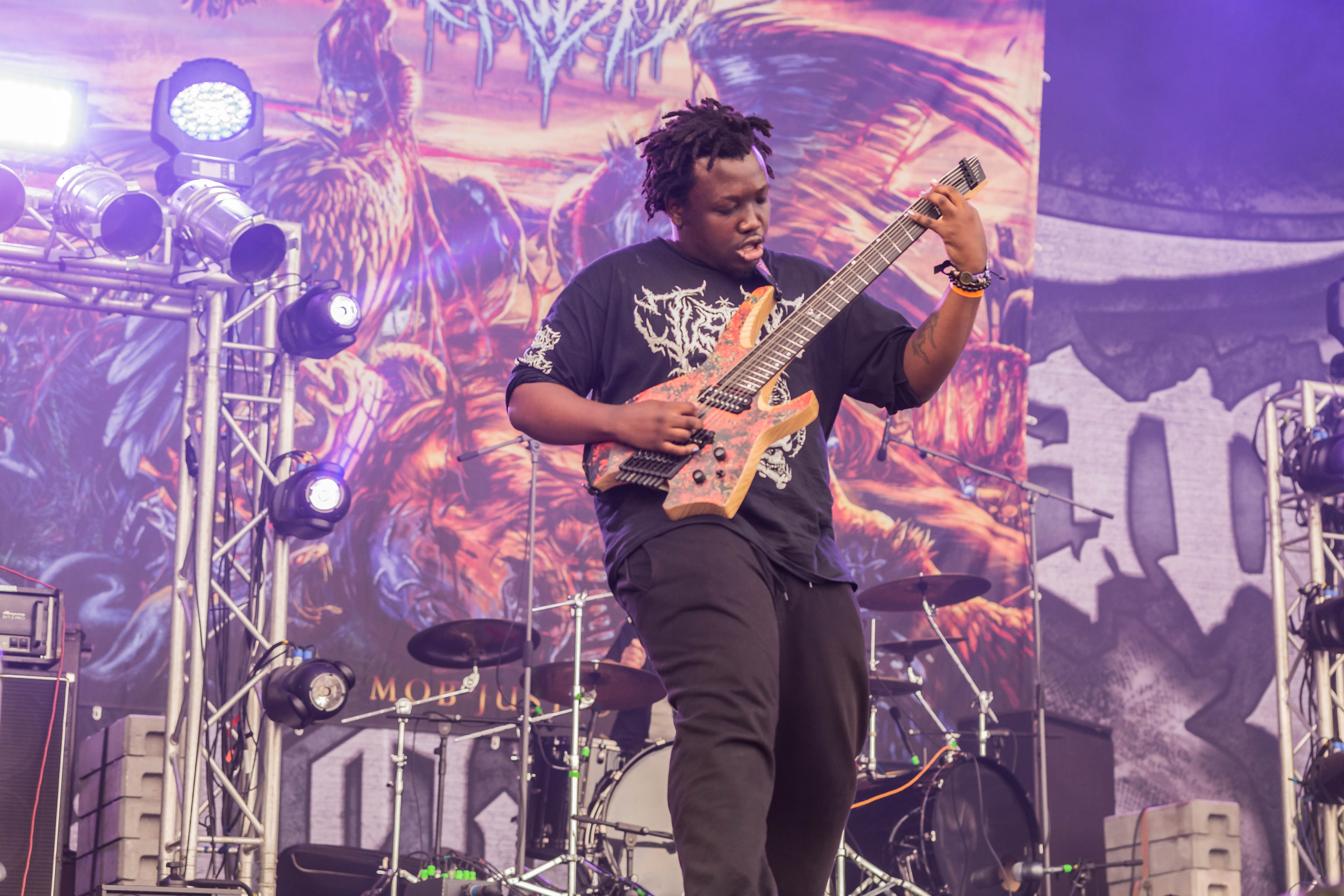
Guitarist/Vocalist Lwandile Prusent

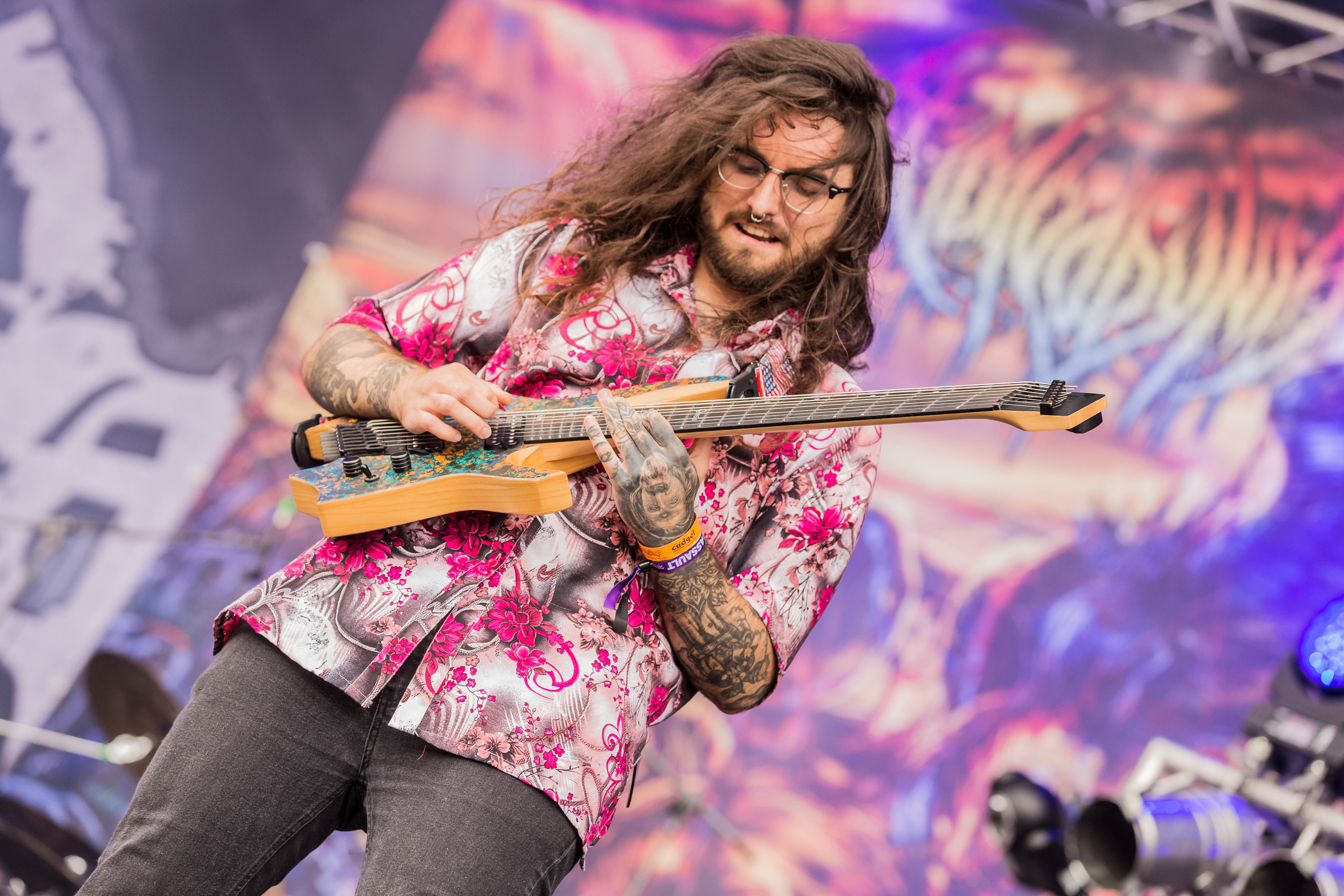
Guitarist Kris Xenopoulos

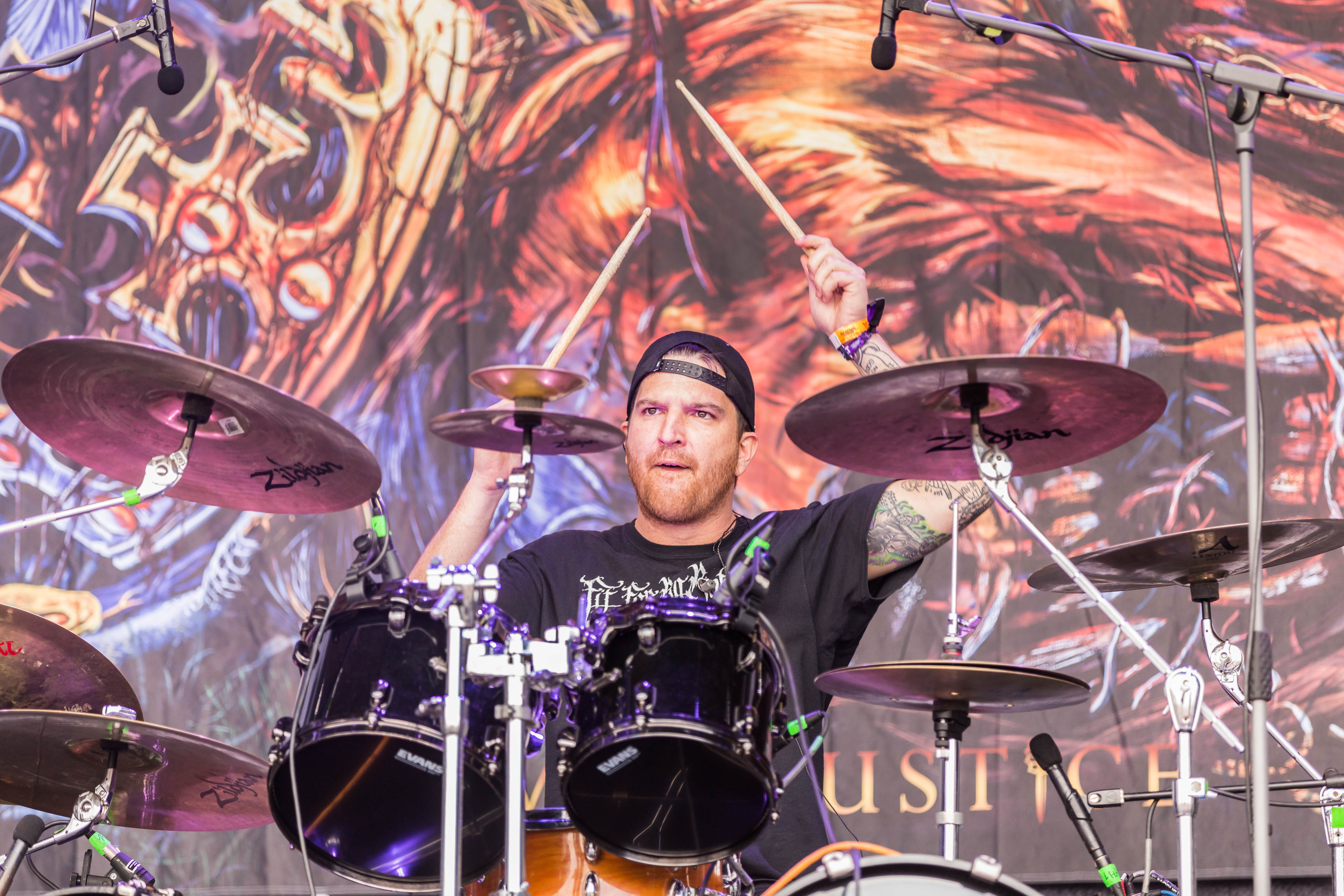
Drummer Thomas Hughes

Current lineup

- Luke Haarhoff – guitars (2014–present), bass (2014–2016, 2016–2018, 2023–2025)
- Lwandile Prusent – guitars (2020–present, live 2018–2020), vocals (2023–2025, 2026, live 2025–present)
- Kris Xenopoulos – bass (2015–2016, 2017–2018, 2023–2025, 2026–present), guitars (2016, 2017–present)
- Thomas Hughes – drums (2019–present, live 2016–2019)
- Nate Gilbert – bass (2025–present, live 2023–2025)
- Maya Pobst – vocals (2026–present)

Former members

- Matt Mader – guitars (2015–2016, 2016–2017)
- Byron Dunwoody – guitars, drum programming (2014–2019), bass (2014–2016, 2016–2018)
- Chris van der Walt – bass (2018–2023)
- Duncan Bentley – vocals (2014–2023)
- Zion Bittenbender – vocals (2025–2026)

Live members

- Dave Mills – drums (2015–2016)
- Chase Drewett – bass (2016)
- Greg Van Kerkhof – bass (2017–2018)

Timeline

== Discography ==
Studio Albums

- Cognizant Castigation (2014)
- Psychosadistic Design (2016)
- Mob Justice (2019)
- Praenuntius Infiniti (2021)
- Entabeni (2024)

EPs

- Lord of Plagues (2014)
- Finis Omnium Ignorantiam (2015)
- Anthropophagus (2019)

Splits

- Slashing Through the Snow (2014) (w/ Cunt Cuntly, Before the Harvest, Cerebus, Bationmaster and The Cake Is a Lie)
- Astral Evisceration on All Hallows Eve (2015) (w/ Cunt Cuntly, Before the Harvest, The Overmind, Chamber of Malice, Despondent, Become The Watcher and Existence Has Failed)
- Societal Lobotomisation (2021) (w/ Acrania)

Singles

- "Mob Justice" (2019)
- "The Disconnect" (2021)
- "The Shadowy Descent of Gaia" (2021)
- "Eternal Wasteland of Galaxies" (2021)
- "Banquet of Enigmatic Horrors I: Terror" (2021)
- "Banquet of Enigmatic Horrors II: Agony" (2021)
- "Artificial Divinity" (2022)
- "Eulogy of Ashes" (2023)
- "Entabeni" (2024)
- "Adamaster" (2024)
- "Twin Tyrants" (2026)
