= Labyrinth (Fleshgod Apocalypse album) =

Studio album by Fleshgod Apocalypse
- Released: August 16, 2013
- Genres: Technical death metal, symphonic death metal
- Length: 53:58
- Label: Nuclear Blast
- Producer: Stefano Morabito

Fleshgod Apocalypse chronology
Agony (2011)	Labyrinth (2013)	King (2016)

Professional ratings
Review scores
Source	Rating
About.com	3.5/5 stars
AllMusic	4.0/5 stars
Exclaim!	7/10
Metal Storm	8.5/10
MetalSucks	4/5 stars

Labyrinth is the third studio album by Italian symphonic death metal band Fleshgod Apocalypse. It was released on August 16, 2013, through Nuclear Blast. It is the first album with the soprano vocals of Veronica Bordacchini, who would become a full-time member of the band in 2020.

== Concept ==
The album is a concept album based upon the labyrinth of Knossos and the characters related to the associated myth. Guitarist and vocalist Tommaso Riccardi said "We focused on the philological aspect in order to represent all the elements of the classic world and, through a manic and meticulous research, we managed to create a metaphor with our times, as the maze can be associated with the endless search for what we really are."

== Track listing ==
No.	Title	Length
1.	"Kingborn"	6:06
2.	"Minotaur (The Wrath of Poseidon)"	5:10
3.	"Elegy"	4:18
4.	"Towards the Sun"	5:42
5.	"Warpledge"	4:32
6.	"Pathfinder"	5:12
7.	"The Fall of Asterion"	4:39
8.	"Prologue"	1:07
9.	"Epilogue"	5:44
10.	"Under Black Sails"	7:26
11.	"Labyrinth"	4:25
Total length:		53:58

== Personnel ==
=== Fleshgod Apocalypse ===
- Tommaso Riccardi – lead vocals, rhythm guitar
- Cristiano Trionfera – lead guitar, backing vocals
- Paolo Rossi – bass, clean vocals
- Francesco Paoli – drums, backing vocals, additional guitars
- Francesco Ferrini – pianos, orchestral samples

=== Additional personnel ===
- Veronica Bordacchini – operatic vocals (tracks 1, 4, 5 & 9)
- Marco Sensi – classical guitar on track 8
- Riccardo Perugini – percussions & marching snare
- Luca Moretti – cello solo on track 9
- Stefano Morabito – production, mixing, mastering
- Colin Marks – artwork
- photo by Salvatore Perrone
- make up by Claudio Castellani

== Charts ==
Chart (2013)	Peak position
Finnish Albums (Suomen virallinen lista)	37
