= Mafia (Fleshgod Apocalypse album) =

EP by Fleshgod Apocalypse
- Released: May 18, 2010
- Recorded: 16th Cellar Studios, January 2010
- Genres: Technical death metal, symphonic death metal
- Length: 23:55
- Label: Willowtip
- Producer: Stefano "Saul" Morabito

Fleshgod Apocalypse chronology
| Oracles (2009) | Mafia (2010) | Agony (2011) |

Professional ratings
Review scores
| Source | Rating |
|---|---|
| Blabbermouth.net | 8.5/10 |
| Metalreview.com | 7.6/10 |
| MetalPsalter.com | 4/5 stars |

Mafia is the first EP by Italian symphonic death metal band Fleshgod Apocalypse. The album was released on May 18, 2010, through Willowtip Records. It was recorded, mixed, mastered and produced by Stefano "Saul" Morabito.

== Track listing ==
All music is composed by Fleshgod Apocalypse except where noted.

| No. | Title | Music | Length |
|---|---|---|---|
| 1. | "Thru Our Scars" | | 5:30 |
| 2. | "Abyssal" | | 6:45 |
| 3. | "Conspiracy of Silence" | | 5:30 |
| 4. | "Blinded by Fear" (At the Gates cover) | Tomas Lindberg, Anders Björler | 3:10 |
| 5. | "Mafia" (instrumental) | Francesco Ferrini | 3:00 |
| Total length: | | | 23:55 |

== Personnel ==
Fleshgod Apocalypse

- Tommaso Riccardi – lead vocals, rhythm guitar
- Cristiano Trionfera – lead guitar, backing vocals
- Paolo Rossi – bass, clean vocals
- Francesco Paoli – drums, additional guitars
- Francesco Ferrini – piano, orchestral arrangements
