= Primordial (album) =

2016 album by Shadow of Intent

Studio album by Shadow of Intent
- Released: January 10, 2016
- Genre: Symphonic deathcore, progressive metal, technical deathcore
- Length: 52:48
- Producer: Chris Wiseman

Shadow of Intent chronology
Inferi Sententia (2014)	Primordial (2016)	Reclaimer (2017)

Primordial is the debut studio album by American deathcore band Shadow of Intent. The album was released on January 10, 2016. It is the band's only studio album to be a two-piece and to feature programmed drums. The tracks "The Prelude to Bereavement", "The Shaping Sickness", "The Cosmic Inquisitor", "The Last Bastion" and "The Indexing" were all originally on the band's 2014 debut EP Inferi Sententia, and were re-recorded for this album. The album is compiled as an instrumental edition along with their second studio album Reclaimer on the album The Instrumentals, released on October 20, 2017. Primordial is listed as one of Revolver's "15 Essential Deathcore Albums".

== Track listing ==
Primordial track listing
No.	Title	Length
1.	"The Prelude to Bereavement"	5:49
2.	"The Shaping Sickness"	4:10
3.	"The Invoking of the Execution of Worlds"	4:14
4.	"The Cosmic Inquisitor"	6:33
5.	"The Didact's Will"	7:46
6.	"The Last Bastion"	4:04
7.	"The Battle of the Maginot Sphere"	4:04
8.	"The Twin Revelation"	5:06
9.	"The Aftermath in Jat-Krula"	6:21
10.	"The Indexing"	4:41
Total length:		52:48

== Personnel ==
Shadow of Intent

- Ben Duerr – lead vocals
- Chris Wiseman – guitars, drum programming, backing vocals, producer, engineering
- Matt Kohanowski - drums

Guests

- Dan Watson (Mire Lore, ex-Infant Annihilator, ex-Enterprise Earth) – vocals on "The Cosmic Inquisitor"

Staff

- Randy Pasquarella – mixing, mastering
- Brutal Disorder Designs – cover art
