= Assemble the Chariots =

Finnish band

- Origin: Helsinki/Espoo, Uusimaa, Finland
- Genres: Deathcore, symphonic death metal
- Years active: 2008-present
- Labels: Seek and Strike
- Members: Kevin Apostol; Niklas Turunen; Sami Mäntylä; Onni Holmström; Mikael Reinikka
- Past members: Elina Corpsela; Ville Murdersved; Alexi Lehto; Tapsa Vapola; Joni Koivu; Kristo Sundström; Juhana Heinonen; Taneli "Tauno" Kaalikoski

Assemble the Chariots is a Finnish symphonic deathcore band, formed in 2008. The band has released four EPs, the last of which, The Celestials, having been independently released in July 2020, and re-released on 25 September 2020 via Seek and Strike records. The band's debut full-length album Unyielding Night was released in July 2024. The album received many positive reviews. The band has released a music video for "Evermurk". The band took part in Caliban's "Back From Hell" European tour in April and May 2025, alongside In Hearts Wake and Cabal.

== Musical style ==
Assemble the Chariots and its material have been described as extreme metal, and more specifically as deathcore, symphonic deathcore, death metal, symphonic metal, and technical deathcore.

== Members ==
Current members

- Kevin Apostol - guitars (2008–present)
- Niklas Turunen - guitars (2008–present)
- Sami Mäntylä - drums, keyboards (2011–present)
- Onni Holmström - vocals (2017–present)
- Mikael Reinikka - bass (2024–present)

Past members

- Elina Corpsela - keyboards (2008–2011)
- Ville Murdersved - vocals (2008–2011)
- Alexi Lehto - drums (2008–2011)
- Tapsa Vapola - bass (2008–2011)
- Joni Koivu - bass (2011–2012)
- Kristo Sundström - vocals (2011–2017)
- Juhana Heinonen - bass (2012–2015)
- Taneli "Tauno" Kaalikoski - bass (2015–2024)

== Discography ==
=== Studio albums ===
- Unyielding Night (2024)

=== EPs ===
- Reflections (2009)
- The Sulphur Voids (2012)
- World Architects (2014)
- The Celestials (2020)

=== Singles ===
- "The Moon Collector" (2017)
- "Empress" (2021)
- "Galactic Order" (2023)
- "Evermurk" (2024)
