= Dragoncorpse =

- Origin: Canada, United States, Australia
- Genres: Power metal, deathcore, metalcore, symphonic death metal
- Years active: 2021-present
- Label: Shattered Earth
- Members: Mardy Leith; Kris Chayer; Noah Nikolas Laidlaw; Justin Gogan; Dale Urban

Dragoncorpse is an international metal band known for their unique blend of power metal and deathcore.

== History ==
Dragoncorpse was formed in 2021 with an international five-piece lineup. While most of the members are based in Canada, Mardy Leith (vocals) is based in Australia and Dale Urban (orchestrations) is based in the United States. The first EP, The Drakketh Saga was released in 2023 and has received positive feedback. A standalone single "Dragonectomy" was released on 27 August 2023.

The band released a new single titled "I Live... AGAIN!" on June 12, 2024, featuring Unleash the Archers bassist Nick Miller. The single is part of their second EP, The Fall of House Abbarath, released on November 1, 2024. The EP has also received positive feedback.

== Musical style ==
Dragoncorpse is known for blending power metal and deathcore, but they are also described as metalcore, death metal, and symphonic metalcore.

== Members ==
- Mardy Leith - vocals
- Kris Chayer - guitars
- Noah Nikolas Laidlaw - bass
- Justin Gogan - drums
- Dale Urban - orchestrations

== Discography ==
=== EPs ===
- The Drakketh Saga (2023)
- The Fall of House Abbarath (2024)

=== Singles ===
- "From the Sky" (2022)
- "Blood and Stone" (2022)
- "Terror Eternal" (2022)
- "Dragussy" (cover/parody of "Nookie" by Limp Bizkit) (2023)
- "Dragonectomy" (2023)
- "I Live... Again!" (2024)
- "Born Again" (2025)
