= A Night in Texas =

Australian deathcore band

- Also known as: ANIT
- Origin: Cairns, Queensland, Australia
- Genres: Deathcore; technical death metal
- Years active: 2009–present
- Labels: Unique Leader Records; Skull and Bones
- Members: Sam Cameron; Cory Judd; Tommy Williams; David Finlay; Chris Whitbread
- Past members: Aaron Coleman; Carlos Hicks; Rheese Peters; Rick Fieldhouse; Anthony Barone; Ethan Lucas; Angus Gasson; Luke Adkins; Zak Borg

A Night in Texas is an Australian deathcore band formed in 2009 in Cairns, Queensland, however has been based in Brisbane since 2013. The band's lineup currently consists of vocalist Sam Cameron, guitarists Cory Judd and Tommy Williams, bassist David Finlay and drummer Chris Whitbread.

The band has released five studio albums with their latest being The Darkest Side of Humanity, released on September 4, 2026, through Unique Leader Records. They have also released one EP, one split-album and one demo. They are currently signed to Unique Leader Records.

== History ==
=== Formation, early years and Invigoration (2009–2013) ===
A Night in Texas was formed in 2009 in Cairns, Queensland. The band released a demo in 2010, that demo would grab the attention of Skull and Bones records and they would then get signed to them. The band released their debut EP titled Invigoration in May 2013. Vocalist Carlos Hicks was forced to step down from the band after being arrested in late 2013, the band would then relocate to Brisbane and hire Rheese Peters (formerly of The Endless Pandemic) as their new vocalist.

=== The God Delusion, Unholy Alliance, Global Slaughter and lineup changes (2014–2018) ===
In November 2013, the band released a single titled "Satan's Upheaval" followed by another single titled "I, Godless" released in September 2014, both of these singles are part of their debut album titled The God Delusion which was released on February 13, 2015. The band would tour in Europe in early 2016 with Aversions Crown and Rings of Saturn. In March 2016, the band announced that they have parted ways with Rheese Peters and that they have recruited Ethan Lucas as their new vocalist. Shortly after the recruitment, the band released a new single titled "The Rotten King" which would appear on their split album with Canadian deathcore band AngelMaker titled Unholy Alliance which was released on October 31, 2016. The split would also feature a popular song by A Night in Texas named "F**k Your God" and a song named "Mortal Drones" which features guest vocals from AngelMaker vocalists Casey Tyson-Pearce and Mike Greenwood. In 2017, The band would support Whitechapel in their Mark of the Blade tour in Asia. In September 2017, the band announced that they have parted ways with their drummer Rick Fieldhouse and that Anthony Barone has joined the band as their new drummer.

On October 12, 2017, the band announced that their second studio album titled Global Slaughter will be released on December 11, 2017, and unveiled a single off the album titled "Population Extermination". In November 2017, the band unveiled another single off the album titled "Harvested" which features Ben Duerr from Shadow of Intent. Barone's time in A Night in Texas wouldn't last long as he would departure from the band in October 2018.

=== The Divine Dichotomy, departure of Ethan Lucas and Digital Apocalypse (2021–2024) ===
The band would return from a hiatus by releasing a new single titled "Flesh Kingdom" on May 24, 2021, and announcing a double album titled The Divine Dichotomy - Chapter I and The Divine Dichotomy - Chapter II, which were both released on July 16, 2021. On June 13, 2021, another single from the album titled "Doom" would be released. On March 24, 2022, the band announced that they had signed to Unique Leader Records and dropped their first single on the label titled "God's Throne". On January 27, 2023, Ethan Lucas announced his departure from the band. On May 15, 2024, the band released a single titled "Apex Of Agony" and announced that their fourth studio album titled Digital Apocalypse would be released on August 2, 2024. Shortly after that, the band welcomed Sam Cameron as their new vocalist on May 19, 2024. Two more singles off the album titled "Welcome To The Gulag" and "Death Protocol" were released on June 6, 2024, and July 11, 2024, respectively. A deathcore band from Sydney named SHIVA released a single in September 2024 titled "Heed The Collapse" which featured Sam Cameron.

=== The Darkest Side of Humanity (2026–present) ===
On July 7, 2026, the band announced that their fifth studio album titled The Darkest Side Of Humanity will release on September 4, 2026 and revealed the first single from the album titled "Metastatic Misery". The second single titled "A Primal Conditioning" was released on August 4, 2026.

== Band members ==
Current lineup

- Sam Cameron – lead vocals (2024–present)
- Cory Judd – lead guitar (2009–present)
- Tommy Williams – rhythm guitar (2024–present)
- David Finlay – bass (2024–present)
- Chris Whitbread – drums (2026–present)

Former members

- Aaron Coleman – lead vocals (2010–2012)
- Carlos Hicks – lead vocals (2012–2013)
- Rheese Peters – lead vocals (2013–2016)
- Rick Fieldhouse – drums (2010–2017)
- Anthony Barone – drums (2017–2018)
- Ethan Lucas – lead vocals (2016–2023)
- Angus Gasson – rhythm guitar (2009–2023)
- Luke Adkins – bass (2009–2023)
- Zak Borg – drums (2018–2026)

Timeline

== Discography ==
Studio Albums

- The God Delusion (2015)
- Global Slaughter (2017)
- The Divine Dichotomy – Chapter I (2021)
- The Divine Dichotomy – Chapter II (2021)
- Digital Apocalypse (2024)
- The Darkest Side of Humanity (2026)

Other Releases

- Demo 2010
- Invigoration (EP, 2013)
- Unholy Alliance (Split w/ AngelMaker, 2016)

Singles

- "Satan's Upheaval" (2013)
- "I, Godless" (2014)
- "The Rotten King" (2016)
- "Population Extermination" (2017)
- "Harvested" (feat. Ben Duerr) (2017)
- "Flesh Kingdom" (2021)
- "Doom" (2021)
- "God's Throne" (2022)
- "Apex of Agony" (2024)
- "Welcome to the Gulag" (2024)
- "Death Protocol" (2024)
- "Metastatic Misery" (2026)
- "A Primal Conditioning" (2026)
