= Reclaimer (album) =

Studio album by Shadow of Intent
- Released: April 28, 2017
- Genres: Symphonic deathcore, progressive death metal, symphonic metal
- Length: 58:25
- Producer: Chris Wiseman

Shadow of Intent chronology
| Primordial (2016) | Reclaimer (2017) | Melancholy (2019) |

Reclaimer is the second studio album by American deathcore band Shadow of Intent. The album was released on April 28, 2017. It is their first album without programmed drum tracks and the first album to feature a unique player on each instrument, with a one-off lineup that includes Matt Kohanowski on drums, Federico Zuccarelli on guitar and Keith Kohlhepp on bass. It reached #4 on the iTunes metal chart at debut.

"The Horror Within" was released in advance on March 31, 2017. The song's lyrics paraphrase a quote from the SpongeBob SquarePants episode "The Secret Box", "The inner machinations of my mind are an enigma." Several vocalists from other deathcore bands guest appear in the album, including Dickie Allen of Infant Annihilator and Jason Evans of Ingested on "The Catacombs".

The album is compiled as an instrumental edition along with their debut Primordial on the album The Instrumentals, released on October 20, 2017.

== Track listing ==
Reclaimer track listing
| No. | Title | Length |
|---|---|---|
| 1. | "We Descend..." | 2:14 |
| 2. | "The Return" | 4:49 |
| 3. | "The Horror Within" | 6:10 |
| 4. | "The Catacombs" | 4:44 |
| 5. | "The Mad Tyrant's Betrayal" | 5:14 |
| 6. | "The Gathering of All" | 4:22 |
| 7. | "The Heretic Prevails" | 4:46 |
| 8. | "The Prophet's Beckoning" | 5:00 |
| 9. | "The Forsaken Effigy" | 4:04 |
| 10. | "The Great Schism (instrumental)" | 4:21 |
| 11. | "The Mausoleum of Liars" | 4:49 |
| 12. | "The Tartarus Impalement" | 7:52 |
| Total length: | | 58:25 |

== Personnel ==
=== Shadow of Intent ===
- Ben Duerr – lead vocals
- Chris Wiseman – guitars, backing vocals, producer, engineering
- Federico Zuccarelli – guitars
- Keith Kohlhepp – bass
- Matt Kohanowski – drums, percussion

=== Guests ===
- Kelsie Hargita (ex-Abigail Williams) – orchestration on "We Descend...", "The Horror Within", and "The Mausoleum of Liars"
- Jason Evans (ex-Ingested) – vocals on "The Catacombs"
- Dickie Allen (Infant Annihilator, Nekrogoblikon) – vocals on "The Catacombs"
- Alex Terrible (Slaughter to Prevail) – vocals on "The Gathering of All"
- Tom Barber (ex-Lorna Shore, Chelsea Grin) – vocals on "The Prophet's Beckoning"

=== Staff ===
- Buster Odeholm – mixing, mastering
- Brutal Disorder Designs – cover art
