= Hour of Penance =

Italian death metal band

- Origin: Rome, Italy
- Genres: Technical death metal, brutal death metal
- Years active: 1999–present
- Labels: Xtreem, Unique Leader, Prosthetic, Agonia
- Members: Paolo Pieri; Giulio Moschini; Marco Mastrobuono; Giacomo Torti
- Past members: Silvano Leone; Francesco Paoli; James Payne; Alex Manco; Mike Viti; Francesco De Honestis; Enrico Schettino; Mauro Mercurio; Simone "Arconda" Piras; Davide Billia
- Website: hourofpenance.net

Hour of Penance is an Italian technical death metal band from Rome that was formed in 1999.

== History ==
Their first demo came out in 2000 and was followed by their first album, Disturbance, released under Spanish label Xtreem Music in 2003. In 2005 the second album Pageantry for Martyrs was released under the same label. In 2008, the band released their first internationally recognized success The Vile Conception under Unique Leader Records. It set the coordinates for their sound, marked by a technical guitar riffing, blast beats and fast vocal lines. In 2010, their fourth album Paradogma was released, and while keeping the brutal approach of the previous work, their sound incorporated more melodic and black metal influences. The album was recognized by the press as one of the death metal highlights of the year and opened the road for a deal with the Los Angeles-based label Prosthetic Records and a tour with Deicide. In 2012, Hour of Penance released Sedition which was followed by various tours with Cannibal Corpse, The Black Dahlia Murder, and DevilDriver amongst the others. Another studio album, Regicide, was released in 2014 and was followed by touring with Behemoth and Cannibal Corpse. The last album published with Prosthetic Records was Cast the First Stone, released in 2017. Hour of Penance then signed a deal with Polish label Agonia Records and released a new album called Misotheism in October 2019.

== Members ==
Current members

- Paolo Pieri – vocals, guitars (2010–present)
- Giulio Moschini – lead guitar (2004–present)
- Marco Mastrobuono – bass (2013–present)
- Giacomo Torti – drums (2022–present)

Former members

- Mike Viti – vocals, bass (1999–2004)
- Alex Manco – vocals (2004–2006)
- Francesco Paoli – vocals (2006–2010)
- Francesco De Honestis – guitars (1999–2004)
- Enrico Schettino – guitars (1999–2006)
- Silvano Leone – bass (2004–2013)
- Mauro Mercurio – drums (1999–2010)
- Simone "Arconda" Piras – drums (2010–2012)
- James Payne – drums (2012–2014)
- Davide "BrutalDave" Billia – drums (2015–2022)

Timeline

== Discography ==
=== Studio albums ===
- 2003 – Disturbance (Xtreem Music)
- 2005 – Pageantry For Martyrs (Xtreem Music)
- 2008 – The Vile Conception (Unique Leader Records)
- 2010 – Paradogma (Unique Leader Records)
- 2012 – Sedition (Prosthetic Records)
- 2014 – Regicide (Prosthetic Records)
- 2017 – Cast The First Stone (Prosthetic Records)
- 2019 – Misotheism (Agonia Records)
- 2024 – Devotion (Agonia Records)

=== Demos ===
- 2000 – Promo 2000
- 2007 – Promo 2007
