= Primeval =

Primeval may refer to:

- Primeval forest, an area of forest that has attained great age
- Primeval number, a positive integer satisfying certain conditions
- Primeval history, name given by biblical scholars to the first eleven chapters of the Book of Genesis

== Film and TV ==
- Primeval (franchise), a British multimedia franchise
  - Primeval (TV series), 2007 UK TV series
  - Primeval: New World, a Canadian science fiction series, based on the British series Primeval
- Primeval (film), a 2007 American horror film
- The Primevals, a 2023 American science fiction film
- Primeval (Doctor Who audio drama), a Big Finish audio play based on the BBC TV series Doctor Who
- "Primeval" (Buffy the Vampire Slayer), an episode of the TV series Buffy the Vampire Slayer

== Other ==
- The Primevals (band), a Scottish rock group

== See also ==
- Primevil, a rock band
- Primitive (disambiguation)
- Primordial (disambiguation)
- Prinivil, a hypertension drug
