= Saltwound =

- Origin: California, United States
- Genres: Deathcore
- Years active: 2020–present
- Labels: Good Fight Music, SharpTone Records

Saltwound is an American deathcore band from California. The band released two EPs independently before getting signed to Good Fight Music. On September 22, 2023, the band released their third EP, entitled In the Shadow of the Valley of Death, and a music video was released for the song "Shadows Remain". In May 2024, the group supported Maylene and the Sons of Disaster in that band's North American tour, alongside Islander and Limbs. In October and November 2024, Saltwound took part in The Last Ten Seconds of Life's North American tour, alongside CELL, Sabella, and Frail Body.

On September 18, 2024, Saltwound announced their debut album The Temptation of Pain. It was released on November 1, 2024. Vocalist Spencer Timmons has considered the album "a 'back to form' moment" for the band. Singles and music videos were released for the songs "Hollow", "Severance", "Walking the Blade", and "Empty from the Start".

== Discography ==
- Vol. 1: (DEAD)WEIGHT (EP) (2020)

No.	Title	Length
1.	"(DEAD)WEIGHT"	1:25
2.	"Hard Life"	2:24
3.	"In Spite of You" (feat. Spencer Letsinger)	2:43
4.	"Assault // Split Lip"	2:13
5.	"Revenant"	3:43
6.	"187"	3:13
Total length:		15:41

- Vol. 2: Despair (EP) (July 26, 2022)

No.	Title	Length
1.	"Despair"	1:21
2.	"A Slower Death"	2:55
3.	"The Negative"	3:31
4.	"Wardogs"	3:10
5.	"Fiend"	2:37
6.	"Serpentine"	2:01
7.	"Drowning"	2:32
Total length:		18:07

- In the Shadow of the Valley of Death (EP) (September 22, 2023)

No.	Title	Length
1.	"Shadows Remain"	3:45
2.	"The Company You Keep"	3:52
3.	"The Negative, Pt. 2"	3:20
Total length:		10:57

- The Temptation of Pain (November 1, 2024)

No.	Title	Length
1.	"We All Burn"	1:23
2.	"Blight"	2:35
3.	"Empty From the Start"	2:47
4.	"Circle the Drain"	2:59
5.	"The Temptation of Pain"	2:08
6.	"Hollow"	3:30
7.	"Walking the Blade"	3:07
8.	"The Righteous Hand"	3:10
9.	"Ensnared"	3:30
10.	"Severance" (feat. Nick Chance)	3:32
Total length:		28:41
