= Synestia (band) =

American deathcore band

- Origin: Minneapolis, U.S.
- Genres: Deathcore, symphonic deathcore, blackened deathcore, melodic death metal
- Years active: 2020–present
- Label: Independent
- Members: Sam Melchior; Ryan Vail; Grant Robinson; Byron London
- Past members: Ville Hokkanen

Synestia is an American deathcore band from Minneapolis, consisting of vocalist Ryan Vail, bassist Grant Robinson, drummer Byron London and Sam Melchior on guitars and orchestrations. The band has released four EPs and one studio album as of 2025, with Sam Melchior being the only member featured in all.

== History ==
Synestia was formed in the fall of 2020 by vocalist Ville Hokkanen from Espoo, Finland and Sam Melchior from Minneapolis on instruments. They released their debut EP, Ashes, the following August. In 2022, they released their debut studio album Maleficium.

In May 2024, they released the EP The Poetic Edda, a collaboration with symphonic deathcore band Disembodied Tyrant. The final track "Winter" is a reimagined version of the 4th Concerto of Antonio Vivaldi's The Four Seasons.

== Style ==
The band is known for their heavy symphonic sound, and has been compared to the likes of Worm Shepherd and Lorna Shore.

== Band members ==
=== Current ===
- Sam Melchior – guitars, orchestration, programming (2020–present)
- Ryan Vail – lead vocals (2025–present)
- Grant Robinson - bass (2025–present)
- Byron London - drums (2025–present)

=== Former ===
- Ville Hokkanen – lead vocals (2020–2024)

== Discography ==
=== Studio albums ===
- Maleficium (2022)

=== EPs ===
- Ashes (2021)
- The Poetic Edda (with Disembodied Tyrant; 2024)
- Premonitions (2025)

=== Singles ===
- "Ascendancy" (2022)
- "Dies Irae" (2025)
- "The Mourning Star" (2025)
- “Premonitions” (2025)
