= Oracles (album) =

Studio album by Fleshgod Apocalypse
- Released: March 30, 2009
- Recorded: May 2008 at 16th Cellar Studio, Rome, Italy
- Genre: Technical death metal
- Length: 37:40
- Label: Candlelight; Willowtip

Fleshgod Apocalypse chronology
Oracles (2009)	Mafia (2010)

Professional ratings
Review scores
Source	Rating
AllMusic	3.5/5 stars
Blabbermouth.net	8/10

Oracles is the debut studio album by Italian symphonic death metal band Fleshgod Apocalypse. It is the first album to feature Francesco Paoli on lead vocals. Paoli would return as lead vocalist on the fifth studio album Veleno after being the drummer for three studio albums and an EP. It is also the only Fleshgod Apocalypse album to feature Mauro Mercurio on drums. Oracles is known for its more technical death metal style, rather than the symphonic death metal style the band would adopt on later albums.

== Track listing ==
No.	Title	Length
1.	"In Honour of Reason"	4:27
2.	"Post-Enlightenment Executor"	2:52
3.	"As Tyrants Fall"	4:00
4.	"Sophistic Demise"	3:11
5.	"Requiem in SI Minore"	5:08
6.	"At the Guillotine"	3:03
7.	"Embodied Deception"	3:21
8.	"Infection of the White Throne"	4:30
9.	"Retrieving My Carcass"	4:08
10.	"Oracles"	2:58

== Personnel ==
Fleshgod Apocalypse

- Francesco Paoli – vocals, rhythm guitar
- Cristiano Trionfera – lead guitar
- Paolo Rossi – bass
- Mauro Mercurio – drums

Additional personnel

- Francesco Ferrini – piano, orchestral arrangements, composition
- Stefano Morabito – recording, mixing, mastering, production
