= Carcosa (band) =

Canadian deathcore band

- Origin: Vancouver
- Genres: Melodic deathcore; technical deathcore
- Years active: 2019–present
- Members: Johnny Ciardullo; Andrew Baena; Cooper Lagace; David Hicks
- Past members: Travis Regnier
- Website: carcosabc.com

Carcosa is a Canadian deathcore band founded in 2019. The group consists of vocalist Johnny Ciardullo, who is also plays the guitar for Angelmaker, guitarists Andrew Baena and Cooper Lagace and drummer David Hicks.

The band formed in 2019 following the breakup of a previous group known as Galactic Pegasus. They released their debut EP, Absent, the following year. Their debut album, Anthology, was released the following year. Their second album, The Axe Forgets, The Tree Remembers, came out in October 2025.

== Discography ==
=== Albums ===
- Anthology (2021)
- The Axe Forgets, The Tree Remembers (2025)

=== EPs ===
- Absent (2020)
- The Ghost Sessions (2023; live EP)
