= Fleshgod Apocalypse =

Italian symphonic death metal band

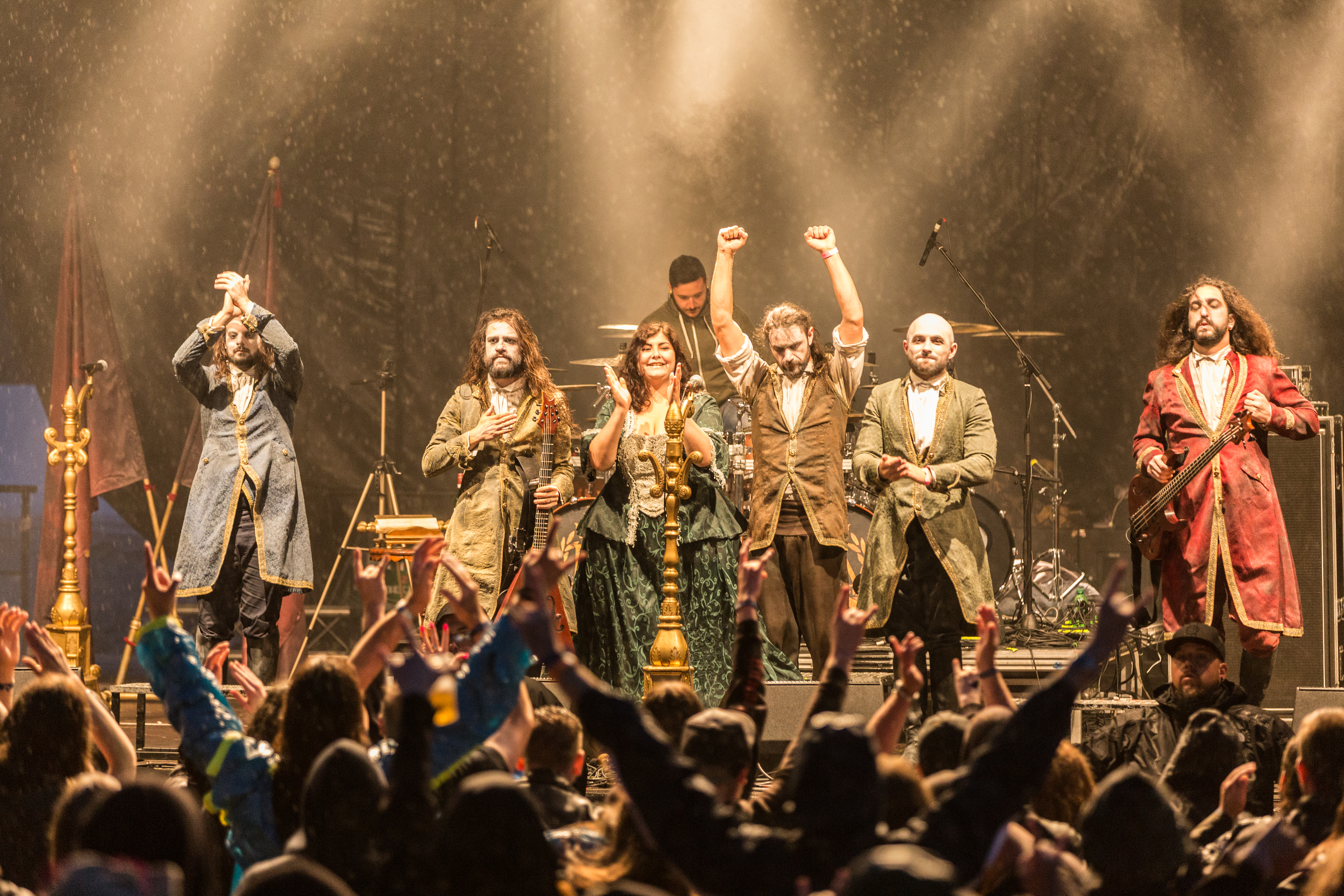
- Fleshgod Apocalypse at Metal Frenzy 2017

Background information
- Origin: Perugia, Italy
- Genres: Symphonic metal; technical death metal
- Years active: 2007–present
- Labels: Willowtip; Candlelight; Nuclear Blast
- Members: Francesco Paoli; Francesco Ferrini; Veronica Bordacchini; Fabio Bartoletti; Eugene Ryabchenko
- Past members: Francesco Struglia; Tommaso Riccardi; Cristiano Trionfera; Paolo Rossi
- Website: www.fleshgodapocalypse.com

Fleshgod Apocalypse is an Italian symphonic metal band. Formed in 2007, the group resides in Perugia and are signed to Nuclear Blast.

== History ==
=== Formation and Oracles (2007–2009) ===
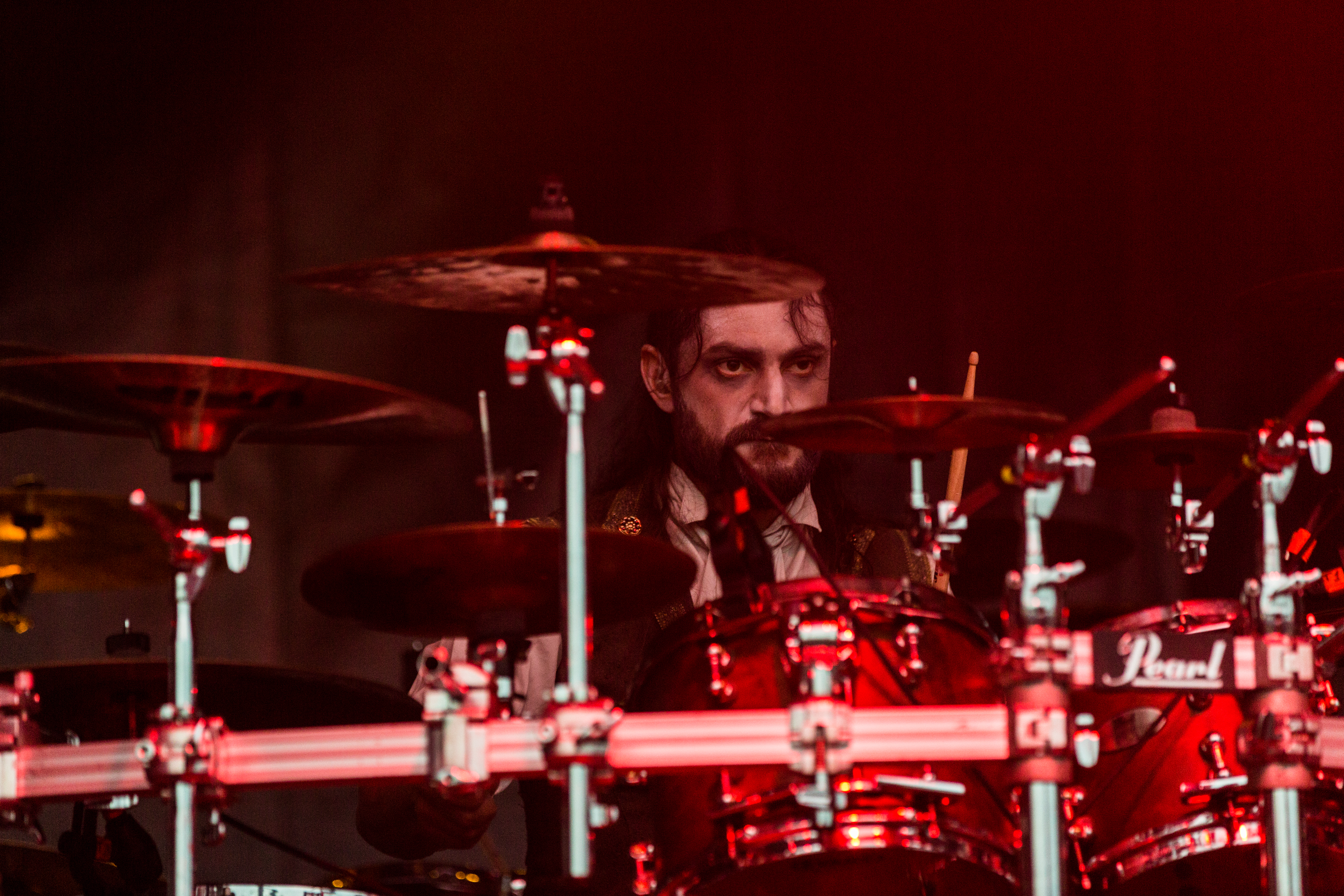
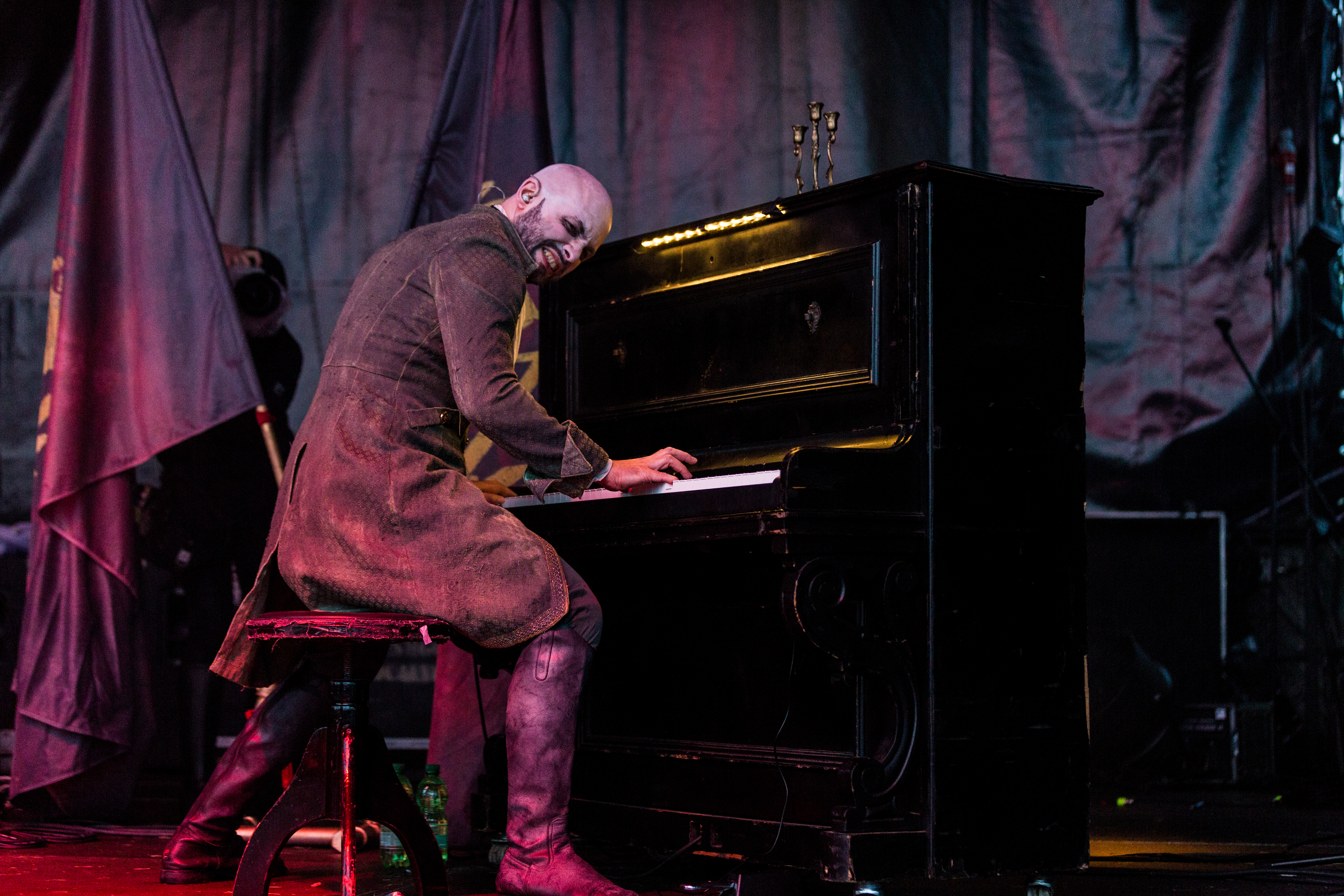
Multi-instrumentalist/vocalist Francesco Paoli (left) and pianist/orchestrator Francesco Ferrini (right) are the only band members to perform in every Fleshgod Apocalypse studio album to date, although Ferrini was a session member in Oracles and Mafia.

Francesco Paoli (former frontman of Hour of Penance) formed Fleshgod Apocalypse in April 2007. They recorded their first demo, Promo '07, at 16th Cellar Studio, in Rome, with producer Stefano "Saul" Morabito, and released it shortly after. The demo was re-released the following year on a split CD with Italian bands Septycal Gorge, Modus Delicti, and Onirik. Fleshgod Apocalypse signed to Neurotic Records. In early 2008, the band toured Europe, supporting Behemoth, Origin, Dying Fetus, Hate Eternal, Suffocation, Napalm Death and many more.

In May 2008, the band recorded its first full-length album, Oracles. In December of that year, the band parted ways with Neurotic Records and signed with Willowtip Records, who released Oracles in 2009. Shortly thereafter, Tommaso Riccardi took over vocals and rhythm guitar, which Francesco Paoli previously handled. Paoli took over drums, replacing session drummer Francesco Struglia.

=== Mafia EP and Agony (2009–2012) ===
In 2010, they recorded the Mafia EP at 16th Cellar Studios, and released it via Willowtip Records. It included three new tracks and a cover of "Blinded by Fear" by At the Gates. The band embarked on another European tour after recording Mafia, supporting Suffocation. Following this tour, they headlined a tour of Russia.

Until 2010, band founder Francesco Paoli was singing in Hour of Penance doing vocals and drumming in Fleshgod Apocalypse. He quit Hour of Penance to focus on Fleshgod Apocalypse full-time as drummer and songwriter. In November 2010, the band signed a worldwide deal with Extreme Management Group, Inc. and began writing the second full-length album. In May 2011, the band signed a worldwide deal with Nuclear Blast Records and began wrapping up work on their second album. During this time, Francesco Ferrini, the pianist and orchestrator of Oracles and Mafia, joined the band as the full-time pianist and orchestrator. This addition honed Fleshgod Apocalypse's sound on their upcoming album.

The band released their second album, Agony, on 9 August 2011 in North America and 19 August 2011 in Europe. The iTunes version of Agony includes a cover of "Heartwork" by Carcass.

Fleshgod Apocalypse took part in the 2011 Summer Slaughter Tour in North America, alongside co-headliners Whitechapel and The Black Dahlia Murder. The band toured the US with Decapitated in late 2011. In January 2012, they toured the UK with The Black Dahlia Murder and Skeletonwitch. During March 2012, Fleshgod Apocalypse toured South Africa, supported by local death metal acts.

On 22 December 2012, the band released a music video for "The Forsaking" from the album Agony.

=== Labyrinth (2012–2016) ===
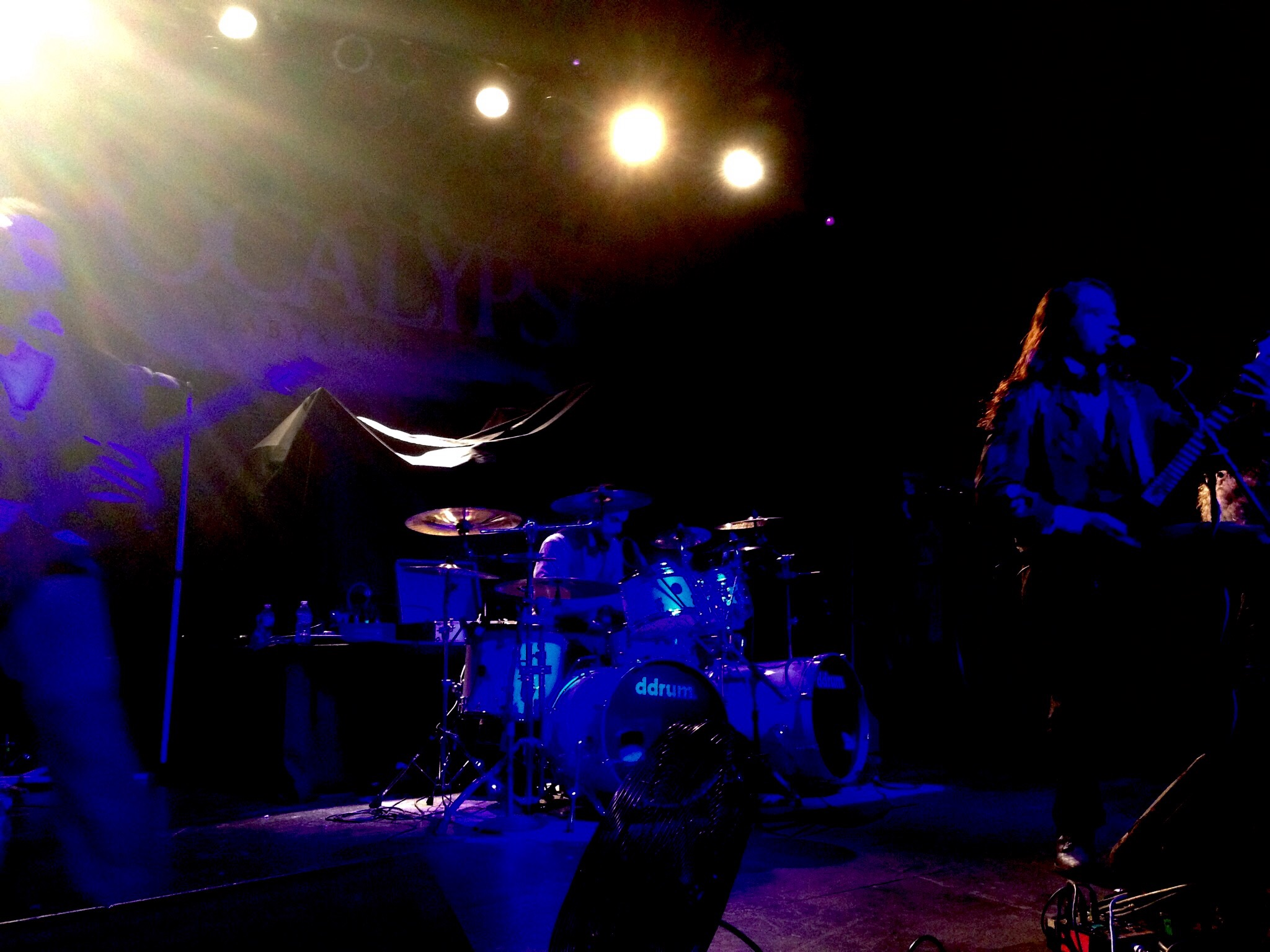
Fleshgod Apocalypse in 2013

Fleshgod Apocalypse's third album, Labyrinth, was released on 16 August 2013, in Europe, and on 20 August 2013, in North America, by Nuclear Blast.Stefano Morabito recorded Labyrinth at 16th Cellar Studio. It features guest contributions, and is a concept album about the Labyrinth of Knossos and its analogies to modern times.

=== King, Trionfera's departure, and Riccardi's departure (2016–2018) ===
Fleshgod Apocalypse released their fourth album, King, on 5 February 2016. The work was successful, peaking at #27 in the Billboard Chart.

On 10 October 2017, the band announced that Tommaso Riccardi had left. He was replaced with drummer Francesco Paoli, who returned to lead vocals and rhythm guitar. Fabio Bartoletti from Deceptionist joined the band on lead guitar, replacing Cristiano Trionfera, who had departed without an announcement. The band recruited David Folchitto as their live touring drummer. He stayed with the band for two years.

=== Veleno, official new members, and No (2019–2023) ===
In 2019, Fleshgod Apocalypse released their fifth album, Veleno. The album continued and expanded on the style of King, and was accompanied with two Giovanni Bucci-directed music videos for the songs "Sugar" and "Monnalisa". Loudwire named it one of the 50 best metal albums of 2019, and Metal Hammer ranked it 11th in their 2021 list of 25 best symphonic metal album of all time. In April 2019, the band announced that they would tour with Hypocrisy in North America with a string quartet.

In February 2020, Eugene Ryabchenko from Vital Remains became the band's new live drummer. Fleshgod Apocalypse was supposed to do another round of American shows with The Agonist in 2020, but this tour was for the most part cancelled due to the COVID-19 pandemic. The band resorted to streaming on YouTube to host Q&A sessions with fans, as well as livestreaming a virtual concert at Bloom Studio in Rome in August. A video for an acoustic version of "The Day We'll Be Gone" was released on 23 October 2020, whereupon they announced that soprano Veronica Bordacchini, guitarist Fabio Bartoletti, and drummer Eugene Ryabchenko had officially joined the band.

On 18 December 2020, the band released the EP No along with a new music video for the title track. In January 2021, they released a cover of Blue (Da Ba Dee).

=== Rossi's departure and Opera (2024–present) ===
Founding bassist Paolo Rossi went on a hiatus from touring in 2023. After employing Delain bassist Ludovico Cioffi as a touring replacement, the band continued as a quintet with Paoli on bass, Bordacchini on clean vocals, and Bartoletti on live guitar. In February 2024, the band confirmed on their Facebook page that Rossi had left. They explained that he would not be replaced, and that Paoli would remain the band's bassist, although he would continue to perform rhythm guitar in the studio.

In March 2024, the band released the single "Pendulum". The song chronicles Paoli's fall while mountain climbing in August 2021 that caused the band to go on hiatus.

On 15 June 2024, a second single, "Bloodclock", was released along with the announcement of their sixth studio album, Opera.

== Band members ==
Current

- Francesco Paoli – lead vocals (2007–2009, 2017–present), rhythm guitar (2007–2009, 2017–present; in studio since 2023), bass guitar (2023–present), drums (2009–2020), backing vocals, additional studio guitars (2009–2017)
- Francesco Ferrini – piano, string arrangements, orchestral effects (2010–present; session/touring: 2009–2010)
- Veronica Bordacchini – operatic vocals (2020–present; session/touring: 2011–2020), clean vocals (2023–present)
- Fabio Bartoletti – lead guitar, backing vocals (2020–present; session/touring: 2017–2020), rhythm guitar (2023–present; live)
- Eugene Ryabchenko – drums (2020–present; session/touring: 2020)

Session and touring

- Mauro Mercurio – drums (2009)
- David Folchitto – drums (2017–2020)
- Ludovico Cioffi – bass (2023)

Former

- Paolo Rossi – bass, clean vocals (2007–2024; on hiatus 2023–2024)
- Tommaso Riccardi – lead vocals, rhythm guitar (2009–2017; session/touring: 2009)
- Cristiano Trionfera – lead guitar, backing vocals (2007–2017)
- Francesco Struglia – drums (2007–2009)

=== Recording ===
Album	Vocals	Rhythm Guitar	Lead Guitar	Bass	Clean Vocals	Drums	Piano
Promo '07	Francesco Paoli		Cristiano Trionfera	Paolo Rossi		Francesco Struglia	none
Oracles	Francesco Paoli		Cristiano Trionfera	Paolo Rossi		Mauro Mercurio	Francesco Ferrini
Mafia	Tommaso Riccardi		Cristiano Trionfera	Paolo Rossi		Francesco Paoli	Francesco Ferrini
Agony	Tommaso Riccardi		Cristiano Trionfera	Paolo Rossi		Francesco Paoli	Francesco Ferrini
Labyrinth	Tommaso Riccardi		Cristiano Trionfera	Paolo Rossi	Paolo Rossi / Veronica Bordacchini	Francesco Paoli	Francesco Ferrini
King	Tommaso Riccardi		Cristiano Trionfera	Paolo Rossi	Paolo Rossi / Veronica Bordacchini	Francesco Paoli	Francesco Ferrini
Veleno	Francesco Paoli		Fabio Bartoletti	Paolo Rossi	Paolo Rossi / Veronica Bordacchini	David Folchitto	Francesco Ferrini
Opera	Francesco Paoli		Fabio Bartoletti	Francesco Paoli	Veronica Bordacchini	Eugene Ryabchenko	Francesco Ferrini

== Discography ==
=== Studio albums ===
- Oracles (2009)
- Agony (2011)
- Labyrinth (2013)
- King (2016)
- Veleno (2019)
- Opera (2024)

=== Split ===
- Da Vinci Death Code (2008)

=== EPs and singles ===
- Mafia (2010)
- "The Fool" (2016)
- "Sugar" (2019)
- "Carnivorous Lamb" (2019)
- "Monnalisa" (2019)
- "The Day We'll Be Gone" (2020)
- "No" (2020)
- "Blue (Turns to Red)" (2021)
- "Pendulum" (2024)
- "Bloodclock" (2024)

=== Collaborations ===
- The Great Tribulation (Epica feat. Fleshgod Apocalypse) (2022)
- Hate Über Alles (Kreator) (2022), on tracks 1 and 11.
