= AngelMaker =

Canadian deathcore band

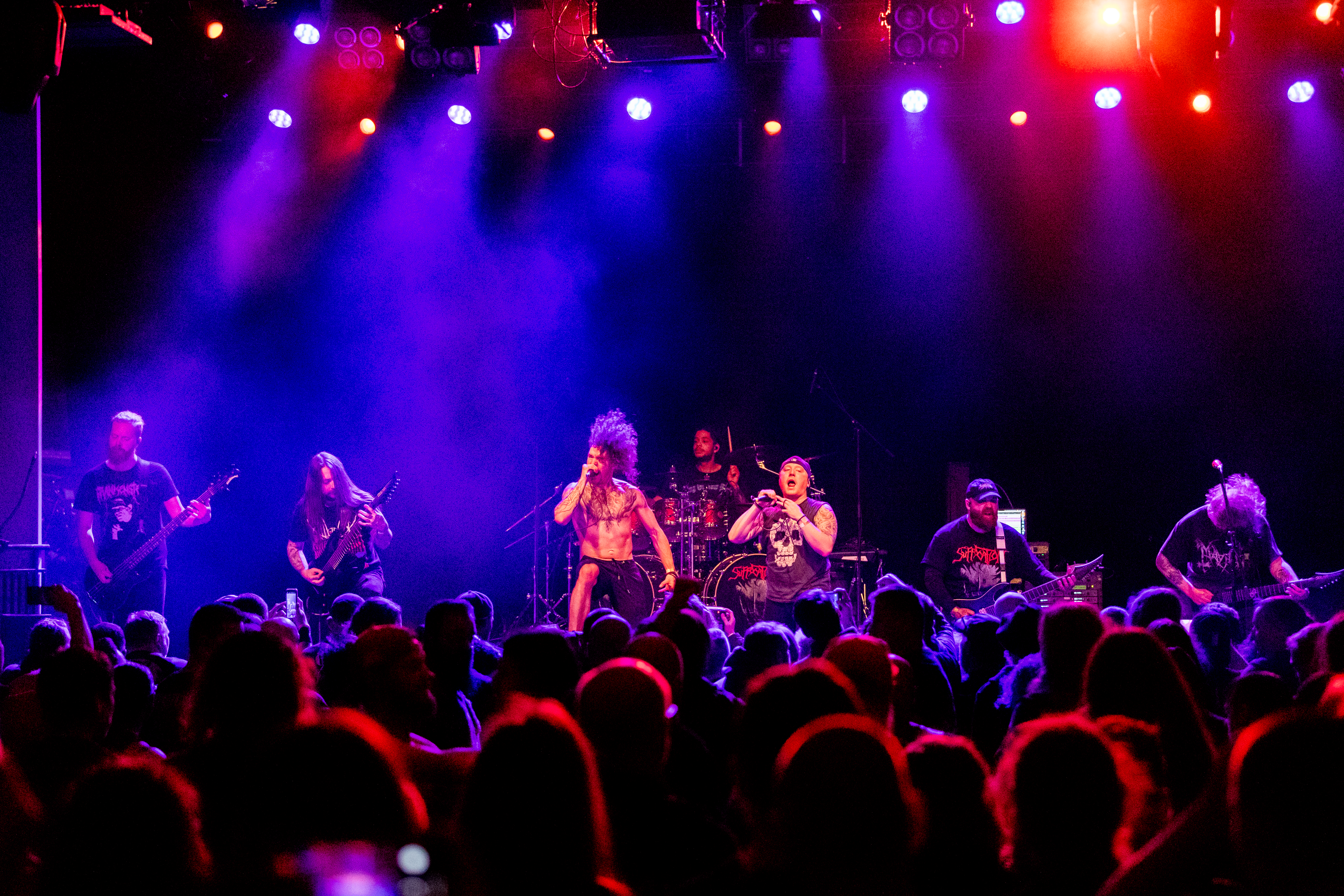
- AngelMaker in 2025

Background information
- Origin: North Vancouver, British Columbia, Canada
- Genres: Deathcore
- Years active: 2011–present
- Members: Casey Tyson-Pearce; Colton Bennett; Cole Rideout; Matt Perrin; Johnny Ciardullo; Steven Sanchez; Ian Bearer
- Past members: Cody Tyson-Pearce; Jesse Price; Mike Greenwood

AngelMaker is a Canadian deathcore band from North Vancouver, British Columbia formed in 2011. The band has seven members, consisting of vocalists Casey Tyson–Pearce and Ian Bearer, guitarists Colton Bennett, Johnny Ciardullo and Matt Perrin, bassist Cole Rideout and drummer Steven Sanchez.

== History ==
AngelMaker formed in 2011. Their first lineup consisted of vocalists Casey Tyson-Pearce and Mike Greenwood, guitarists Cody Tyson-Pearce and Colton Bennett, bassist Cole Rideout, and drummer Jesse Price. In September 2012, the band self-released their debut EP Decay, which features six tracks and a collaboration with Darian Mazloomi of Argent Strand. Almost half a year later, they released a 3-fold split EP with the bands Lament and Isolations. In 2014, guitarist Cody Tyson-Pearce left the band, and was replaced by former Threat Signal guitarist Matt Perrin.

They independently released their debut studio album Dissentient in 2015. In October 2016, they released the split EP Unholy Alliance with Australian deathcore band A Night in Texas. Between March 3 and April 8, 2017, Angelmaker played their first concert tour as a headliner across the United States, with the tour kicking off in Vancouver. This tour was accompanied by Falsifier. After winning a fan contest, the group was allowed to open the full Summer Slaughter Tour. They next released their self-titled sophomore album in 2019.

In 2020, guitarist and songwriter Johnny Ciardullo joined the band, and the following year founding drummer Jesse Price left. In March 2022, they released their third studio album Sanctum. The album was met with overall positive reception and was described as being standard, classic deathcore. Later that year new drummer Steven Sanchez, formerly of The Last Ten Seconds of Life, joined the band.

From late 2022 to early 2023, the band released covers from various bands such as, "In Dying Days" by As Blood Runs Black, "Knee Deep" by Job for a Cowboy and "Deathmask Divine" by The Black Dahila Murder.

The band would then go on a headline tour, dubbed "The Suffer Forever Tour" that took place across the US and Canada from August to September 2023 with support from Vulvodynia, Falsifier, Carcosa, and A Wake In Providence. On August 11, 2023 the band released another split EP, this time with Carcosa titled The Ghost Sessions. On November 10, 2023 the band released a single titled "Suffer Forever".

In October 2024, the band announced former Rings of Saturn vocalist Ian Bearer as their new co-lead vocalist alongside Casey Tyson-Pearce, quietly parting ways with founding co-lead vocalist Mike Greenwood in the process. Greenwood had been absent from recent live performances, with his spot temporarily filled by multi-instrumentalist Cameron "Big Chocolate" Argon, notably of the solo project Disfiguring the Goddess. On October 24, AngelMaker released the single and music video "Relinquished", their first release to feature Bearer on vocals.

On July 30, 2025, AngelMaker released the single and music video "Silken Hands". On October 16, the band announced their fourth album, This Used to Be Heaven, would be released on November 20.

== Band members ==
=== Current ===
- Casey Tyson-Pearce – vocals (2011–present)
- Colton Bennett – guitar (2011–present), vocals (2024-present)
- Cole Rideout – bass (2011–present)
- Matt Perrin – lead guitar (2014–present)
- Johnny Ciardullo – guitar (2020–present)
- Steven Sanchez – drums (2022–present)
- Ian Bearer – vocals (2024–present)

=== Former ===
- Cody Tyson-Pearce – lead guitar (2011–2014)
- Jesse Price – drums (2011–2021)
- Mike Greenwood – vocals (2011–2024)

=== Session ===
- Cameron Argon – vocals (2024)

== Discography ==
=== Studio albums ===
- Dissentient (2015)
- AngelMaker (2019)
- Sanctum (2022)
- This Used to Be Heaven (2025)

=== EPs ===
- Decay (2012)

=== Splits ===
- Lament / Isolations / AngelMaker (2013)
- Unholy Alliance (2016)
- The Ghost Sessions (2023)

=== Singles ===
- “Squirrels” (2011)
- "Dawn" (2021)
- "Twilight" (2021)
- "Dusk" (2021)
- "Eclipse" (2021)
- "In Dying Days (As Blood Runs Black cover)" (2022)
- "Knee Deep (Job for a Cowboy cover)" (2023)
- "Deathmask Divine (The Black Dahila Murder cover)" (2023)
- "Suffer Forever" (2023)
- "Relinquished" (2024)
- "Silken Hands" (2025)
- "The Omen Part II: Acquiesce" (2025)
