= Disembodied Tyrant =

American deathcore band

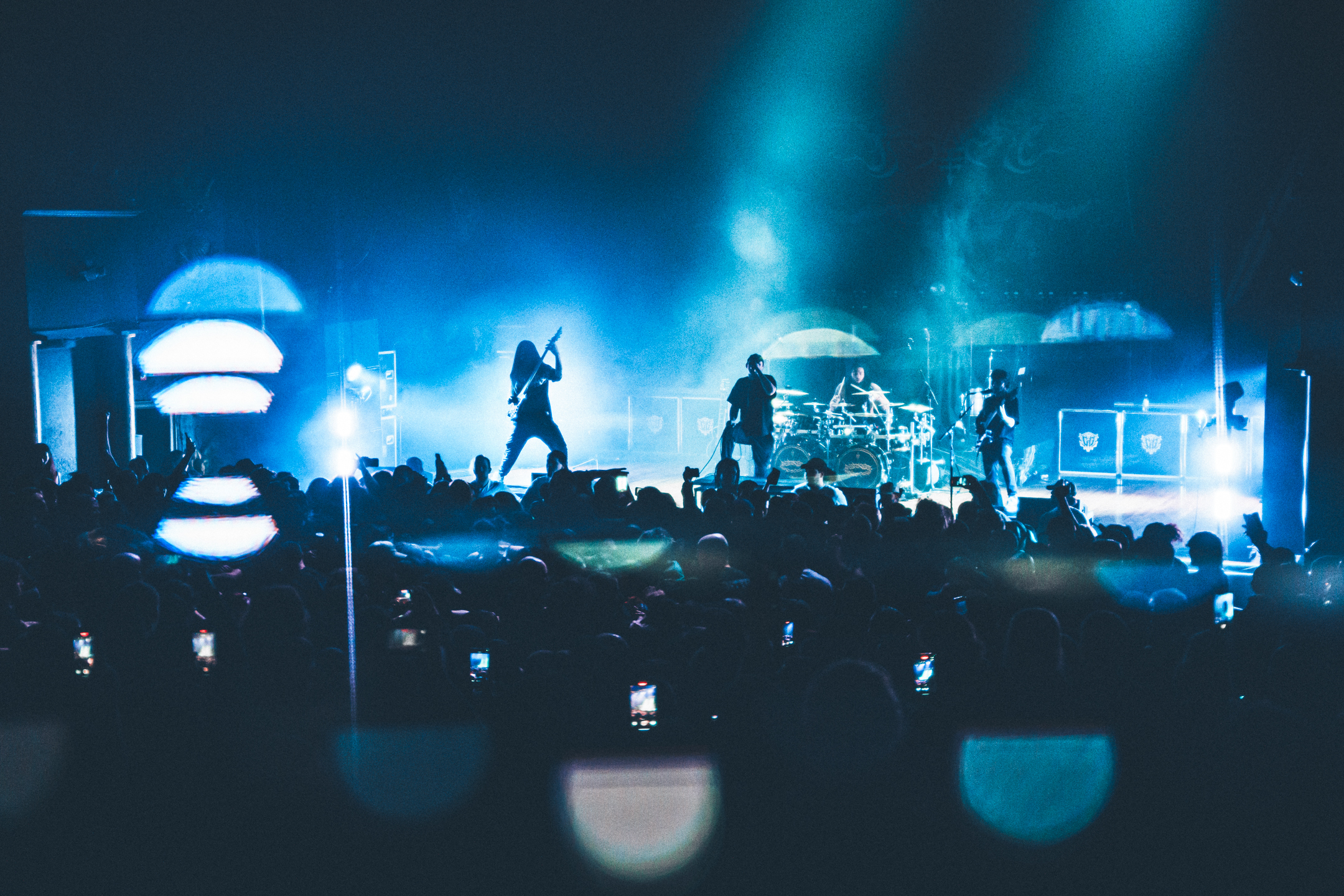
- Disembodied Tyrant performing live in 2025

Background information
- Origin: Missouri, U.S.
- Genres: Deathcore, symphonic death metal, technical death metal, blackened deathcore
- Years active: 2020–present
- Label: Nuclear Blast
- Members: Blake Mullens; Lucas Koughan; Dominic Petrocelli; Kevin Alexander
- Past members: Donovan Parchment; Hvlfern; Rene Gerbrandij

Disembodied Tyrant is an American deathcore band from Missouri.

== History ==
Disembodied Tyrant was formed in 2020 by vocalist Donovan Parchment and producer Wilhelm Vickers(ex HVLFERN). Current vocalist, guitarist and songwriter Blake Mullens joined the band in November 2021 with Parchment and Vickers leaving the following August.

In January 2021, the band released their debut single "Limbo". Later that year, they released their debut EP, Eclipse, Pt. 1. In May 2024, they released the EP The Poetic Edda, a collaboration with symphonic deathcore band Synestia. The final track "Winter" is a reimagined version of the 4th Concerto of Antonio Vivaldi's The Four Seasons. Several months later, they released another EP, The Tower: Part One.

In March 2025, the band signed to Nuclear Blast and released the single "8.6 Blackout", accompanied by a music video. They also announced that they were going on tour with Chelsea Grin, Shadow of Intent, and Signs of the Swarm.

In November 2025, it was announced that Blake Mullens was seriously injured in an unspecified "freak accident". Filling in for him in the band's upcoming US tour with Whitechapel are Trevor Teichert (Winter's Gate) and Ryan Vail (Synestia).

== Style ==
The band is known for their heavy symphonic sound, and has been compared to the likes of Shadow of Intent and Mental Cruelty.

== Band members ==
=== Current ===
- Blake Mullens – lead vocals, rhythm guitar (2021–present)
- Dominic Petrocelli – lead guitar, backing vocals (2023–present)
- Lucas Koughan – bass (2023–present)
- Kevin Alexander – drums (2023–present)

=== Live ===
- Trevor Teichert – lead vocals (2025–present)
- Ryan Vail – lead vocals (2025–present)

=== Former ===
- Donovan Parchment – lead vocals (2020–2022)
- Wilhelm Vickers (ex HVLFERN) – production (2020–2022)
- René Gerbrandij – drums (2022–2023)

== Discography ==
=== EPs ===
- Eclipse, Pt. 1 (2021)
- The Divine Stigmata (2022)
- The Poetic Edda (with Synestia; 2024)
- The Tower: Part One (2024)
