= Contrarian (band) =

American death metal band

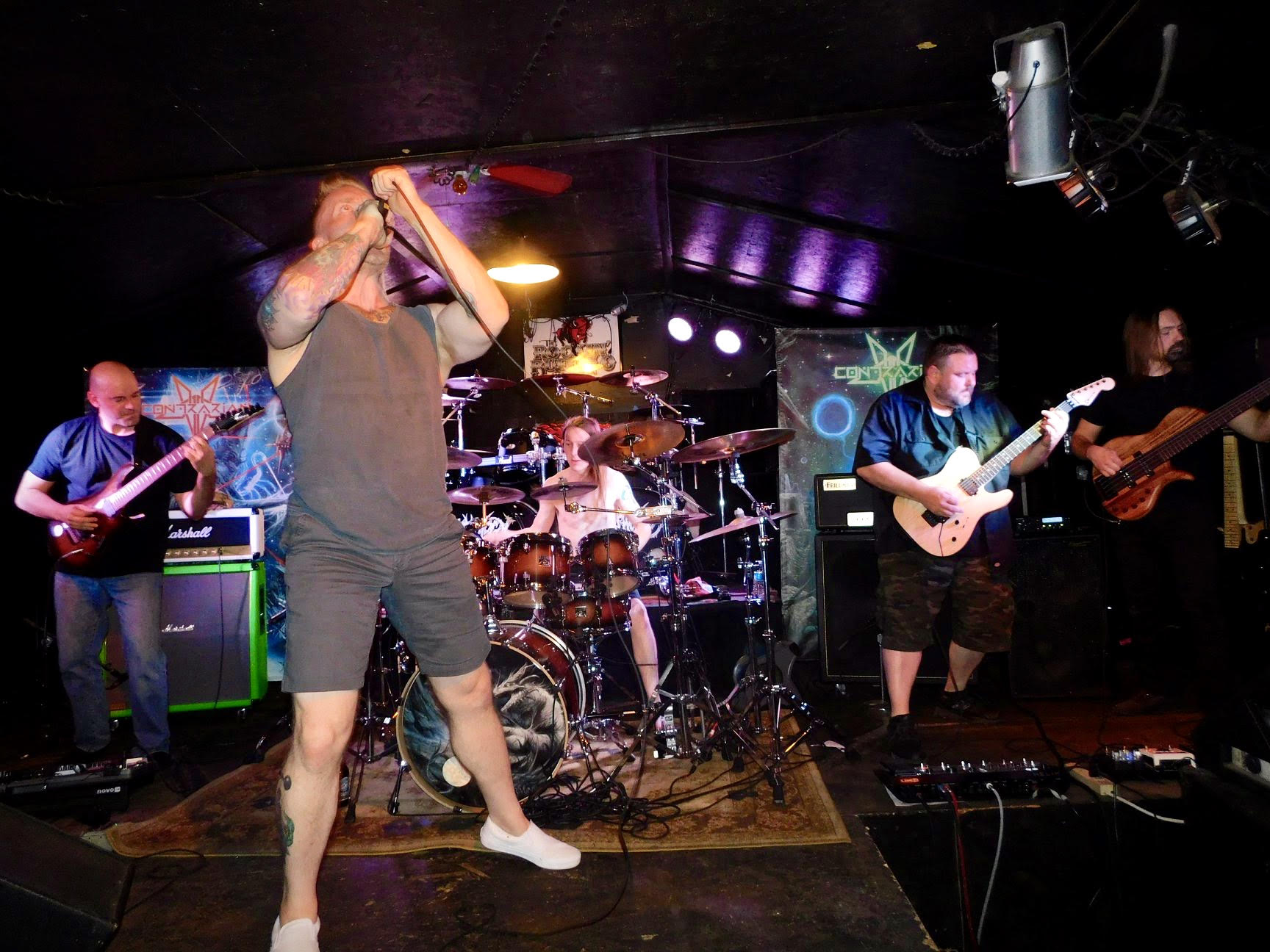

Background information
- Origin: Rochester, New York, U.S.
- Genres: Technical death metal, progressive metal
- Years active: 2012–present
- Label: Willowtip Records
- Members: Jim Tasikas; Brian Mason; Bill Bodily; George Kollias; Jakob Sin
- Past members: Cody McConnell; Alex Cohen; Ed Paulsen; Patrice Hamelin; Bryce Butler
- Website: contrarianofficial.com

Contrarian is an American extreme metal band from Rochester, New York, founded in 2012 by guitarist Jim Tasikas. They are influenced by 1990's progressive death metal bands such as Death and Cynic, combining the style with modern technical death metal. The band has drummer George Kollias for their first three and most recent albums.

== History ==
The band was originally formed in 2012 in Rochester, New York, by Jim Tasikas. Jim then enlisted his friend Ed Paulsen for bass duties, Brian Mason as lead guitar and George Kollias of Nile for drums. Contrarian came from the progressive and technical metal scene birthed in Rochester in the mid-1990s which also brought to light bands such as Lethargy, Mastodon and Psyopus. Contrarian recorded their first EP "Predestined" in 2014. This EP caught the attention of Jason Tipton at Willowtip Records, and within one year the band released their first full-length album, Polemic, on November 20, 2015.

The band's two latest albums, Only Time Will Tell and Sage of Shekhinah, were also released via Willowtip Records, with mixing by producer Neil Kernon. Contrarian has had guest appearances from Paul Masvidal of Cynic and Leon Macey of Mithras UK.

As of 2020, guitarists Jim Tasikas and Brian Mason are endorsed by ESP guitars. Contrarian are known for their detailed album art covers and concept albums dealing with themes of philosophy and theology. Contrarian are also known for reviving an organic approach to recording technical metal in studio settings.

== Band members ==
Current

- Brian Mason – guitars (2014–present)
- Jim Tasikas – guitars (2014–present)
- Bill Bodily – bass (2019–present)
- Jakob Sin – vocals (2022–present)
- George Kollias – drums (2014–2019, 2024–present)

Former

- Cody McConnell – vocals (2015, 2019–2021)
- Leon Macey – guitars (2014–2016)
- Ed Paulsen – bass (2014–2019)
- Bryce Butler – drums (2019–2022)
- Alex Cohen – drums (2022–2024)

== Discography ==
=== Studio albums ===
- Predestined (2014)
- Polemic (2015)
- To Perceive Is to Suffer (2017)
- Their Worm Never Dies (2019)
- Only Time Will Tell (2020)
- Sage of Shekhinah (2023)
- Demos & Oddities 1995-1999 (2023)
