= The Summer Slaughter Tour =

Annual heavy metal music tour

- Genre: Death metal, metalcore, progressive metal, heavy metal
- Locations: United States (2001–present); Mexico (2010); Canada (2008, 2009, 2014–2015); Europe (2008); Australia/New Zealand (2009)
- Years active: 2001–present
- Founders: Ash Avildsen
- Website: sumerianrecords.com/summerslaughter

The Summer Slaughter Tour is an annual heavy metal music tour held every year since 2007. It originated in North America in 2001 with headliner Vader and has toured in Canada in 2008, Europe in 2008, and Australia and New Zealand in 2009. Billed as "The Most Extreme Tour of the Year", Summer Slaughter has earned a reputation as being one of the few summer tours to cater exclusively to fans of extreme forms of metal music. Starting in 2012, Summer Slaughter began to add more progressive metal bands to their lineups, seeing Between the Buried and Me co-headline with Cannibal Corpse. Periphery also played Summer Slaughter 2012, and came back during Summer Slaughter 2013, along with progressive metal bands Animals as Leaders and The Ocean. The focus on progressive metal that year was controversial and many people were "into" heavy metal music, and death metal focused lineups returned in 2014, seeing Morbid Angel headline.

== 2007 ==
Headliner:

- Necrophagist

Supporting bands:

- Decapitated
- Cephalic Carnage
- Cattle Decapitation
- The Faceless
- As Blood Runs Black
- Arsis
- Ion Dissonance
- Beneath the Massacre
- Daath (June 3–10)

Tour dates

| Date | City | Country | Venue |
|---|---|---|---|
| June 1, 2007 | Clifton Park | United States | Northern Lights |
| June 2, 2007 | Allentown | United States | Crocodile Rock Cafe (Infest Festival 2007) |
| June 3, 2007 | Springfield | United States | Jaxx |
| June 4, 2007 | Spartanburg | United States | Ground Zero |
| June 5, 2007 | Louisville | United States | Headliner's |
| June 6, 2007 | Atlanta | United States | The Masquerade |
| June 8, 2007 | Houston | United States | Meridian |
| June 9, 2007 | San Antonio | United States | White Rabbit |
| June 10, 2007 | Fort Worth | United States | Ridglea Theater |
| June 11, 2007 | Odessa | United States | Dos Amigos |
| June 13, 2007 | Tucson | United States | The Rock |
| June 14, 2007 | Las Vegas | United States | Cheyenne Saloon |
| June 15, 2007 | San Diego | United States | Soma |
| June 16, 2007 | Los Angeles | United States | House of Blues |
| June 17, 2007 | Orangevale | United States | The Boardwalk |
| June 19, 2007 | Portland | United States | Hawthorne Theater |
| June 20, 2007 | Seattle | United States | Studio Seven |
| June 21, 2007 | Bend | United States | Midtown Ballroom |
| June 22, 2007 | Ogden | United States | Country Club Theatre |
| June 23, 2007 | Denver | United States | Cervantes |
| June 24, 2007 | Lawrence | United States | The Bottleneck |
| June 26, 2007 | Sauget | United States | Pop's |
| June 27, 2007 | Mokena | United States | The Pearl Room |
| June 28, 2007 | Detroit | United States | Majestic Theatre |
| June 30, 2007 | Hartland | United States | Skateworld (Robot Mosh Fest V) |
| July 1, 2007 | Cleveland | United States | Peabody's |
| July 2, 2007 | Toronto | Canada | The Opera House |
| July 3, 2007 | Montreal | Canada | Café l'inconditionnel |
| July 4, 2007 | Montreal | Canada | Les Foufounes Électriques |
| July 5, 2007 | Quebec City | Canada | L'Anti |
| July 6, 2007 | Worcester | United States | Palladium |
| July 7, 2007 | Baltimore | United States | Sonar |
| July 8, 2007 | New York City | United States | B.B. King Blues Club |

== 2008 ==
Headliner:

- The Black Dahlia Murder

Supporting bands:

- Kataklysm
- Vader
- Cryptopsy
- The Faceless
- Despised Icon
- Aborted
- Born of Osiris
- Psycroptic
- Whitechapel

Tour dates:

| Date | City | Country | Venue |
|---|---|---|---|
| June 20, 2008 | Detroit | United States | Majestic Theatre |
| June 21, 2008 | Cleveland | United States | Peabody's |
| June 22, 2008 | Louisville | United States | Headliner's Music Hall |
| June 24, 2008 | Albany | United States | Northern Lights |
| June 25, 2008 | Philadelphia | United States | The Trocadero |
| June 26, 2008 | New York City | United States | Irving Plaza |
| June 27, 2008 | Worcester | United States | The Palladium |
| June 28, 2008 | Sayreville | United States | Starland Ballroom |
| June 29, 2008 | Richmond | United States | The National |
| June 30, 2008 | Spartanburg | United States | Ground Zero |
| July 1, 2008 | Atlanta | United States | The Masquerade |
| July 2, 2008 | St. Petersburg | United States | Jannus Landing |
| July 4, 2008 | San Antonio | United States | White Rabbit |
| July 5, 2008 | Houston | United States | Meridian |
| July 6, 2008 | Dallas | United States | House of Blues |
| July 8, 2008 | Albuquerque | United States | Sunshine Theater |
| July 9, 2008 | El Paso | United States | Club 101 |
| July 10, 2008 | Phoenix | United States | Marquee Theater |
| July 11, 2008 | Los Angeles | United States | House of Blues |
| July 12, 2008 | Bakersfield | United States | The Dome |
| July 13, 2008 | San Diego | United States | SOMA |
| July 15, 2008 | San Francisco | United States | The Fillmore |
| July 17, 2008 | Portland | United States | Hawthorne Theater |
| July 18, 2008 | Seattle | United States | Studio Seven |
| July 19, 2008 | Spokane | United States | Big Easy Concert House |
| July 20, 2008 | Boise | United States | Big Easy Concert House |
| July 21, 2008 | Salt Lake City | United States | Avalon Theatre |
| July 23, 2008 | Denver | United States | Cervantes Ballroom |
| July 24, 2008 | Omaha | United States | Sokol Underground |
| July 25, 2008 | Minneapolis | United States | First Avenue |
| July 26, 2008 | Milwaukee | United States | The Rave |
| July 27, 2008 | St. Louis | United States | Pop's |
| July 28, 2008 | Chicago | United States | House of Blues |

== 2008 (Canada) ==
Headliner:

- Necrophagist

Support bands:

- Brutal Truth (Toronto only)
- Dying Fetus
- Beneath The Massacre
- Into Eternity
- Neuraxis
- Whitechapel
- Veil of Maya
- Divinity
- Common Grave

Tour dates

| Date | City | Country | Venue |
|---|---|---|---|
| August 14, 2008 | Quebec City | Canada | Imperial |
| August 15, 2008 | Montreal | Canada | Club Soda |
| August 16, 2008 | Toronto | Canada | Opera House |
| August 18, 2008 | Thunder Bay | Canada | Kilroys |
| August 19, 2008 | Winnipeg | Canada | Garrick Center |
| August 20, 2008 | Regina | Canada | Riddell Center |
| August 21, 2008 | Calgary | Canada | Warehouse |
| August 22, 2008 | Edmonton | Canada | Starlite |
| August 23, 2008 | Prince George | Canada | Roll-a-Dome |
| August 25, 2008 | Vancouver | Canada | Commodore Ballroom (no Common Grave, Divinity) |

== 2008 (Europe) ==
Headliner:

- Suicide Silence

Supporting bands:

- As Blood Runs Black
- Abigail Williams
- Born of Osiris
- Annotations of an Autopsy
- The Berzerker

Tour dates

| Date | City | Country | Venue |
|---|---|---|---|
| August 29, 2008 | Liverpool | England | Barfly |
| August 30, 2008 | Glasgow | Scotland | The Garage |
| August 31, 2008 | Wrexham | Wales | Central Station |
| September 2, 2008 | Sheffield | England | The Corporation |
| September 3, 2008 | Nottingham | England | Rescue Rooms |
| September 4, 2008 | Wolverhampton | England | Wulfrun Hall |
| September 5, 2008 | Oxford | England | The Zodiac |
| September 6, 2008 | London | England | Islington Academy |
| September 7, 2008 | Brighton | England | Concorde 2 |
| September 8, 2008 | Newport | Wales | TJ's |
| September 10, 2008 | Stuttgart | Germany | Röhre |
| September 11, 2008 | Vienna | Austria | Arena |
| September 12, 2008 | Jena | Germany | F-Haus |
| September 13, 2008 | Berlin | Germany | Kato |
| September 14, 2008 | Bochum | Germany | Matrix |
| September 15, 2008 | Aarschot | Belgium | Jeugdcentrum De Klinker |

== 2009 (Australia/New Zealand) ==
Headliner:

- Necrophagist

Supporting bands:

- Dying Fetus
- Aborted
- The Red Shore (withdrew)
- The Faceless
- Dawn of Azazel (New Zealand only)
- Ulcerate (New Zealand only)

Tour dates

| Date | City | Country | Venue |
|---|---|---|---|
| March 13, 2009 | Sydney | Australia | The Manning Bar |
| March 14, 2009 | Brisbane | Australia | The Red Room |
| March 15, 2009 | Adelaide | Australia | Fowlers Live |
| March 16, 2009 | Perth | Australia | Club Capitol |
| March 17, 2009 | Melbourne | Australia | The Corner Hotel |
| March 20, 2009 | Auckland | New Zealand | Transmission Room |

== 2009 ==
Headliners:

- Necrophagist
- Suffocation (until 7/3 but also played 7/19)
- Behemoth (replaced Suffocation on 5, 6 and 7 July)

Supporting bands:

- Darkest Hour
- Winds of Plague
- Dying Fetus (until 7/14)
- Born of Osiris
- Origin
- After the Burial
- Beneath the Massacre
- Blackguard
- Decrepit Birth (second half of tour only June 28 – July 20)
- Ensiferum (second half of tour only June 28 – July 20)

Tour dates:

| Date | City | Country | Venue |
|---|---|---|---|
| June 5, 2009 | Baltimore | United States | Sonar |
| June 6, 2009 | Richmond | United States | The National |
| June 7, 2009 | Philadelphia | United States | TLA |
| June 8, 2009 | Hartford | United States | Webster Theater |
| June 10, 2009 | Charlotte | United States | Amos Southend |
| June 12, 2009 | Louisville | United States | Headliners |
| June 13, 2009 | Atlanta | United States | The Masquerade |
| ~~June 14, 2009~~ | ~~St. Petersburg~~ | United States | ~~Jannus Landing~~ |
| June 15, 2009 | Jacksonville | United States | Plush |
| June 16, 2009 | Orlando | United States | Club Firestone |
| June 18, 2009 | San Antonio | United States | White Rabbit |
| June 19, 2009 | Houston | United States | Java Jazz |
| June 20, 2009 | San Antonio | United States | White Rabbit |
| June 21, 2009 | Dallas | United States | House of Blues |
| June 23, 2009 | Denver | United States | Gothic Theatre |
| June 24, 2009 | Albuquerque | United States | Sunshine Theater |
| June 26, 2009 | Phoenix | United States | The Marquee Theatre |
| June 27, 2009 | San Diego | United States | Soma |
| June 28, 2009 | Anaheim | United States | The Grove |
| June 29, 2009 | Las Vegas | United States | House of Blues |
| June 30, 2009 | Los Angeles | United States | House of Blues |
| July 1, 2009 | San Francisco | United States | The Grand Ballroom |
| July 2, 2009 | Portland | United States | Roseland Theater |
| July 3, 2009 | Seattle | United States | King Cat Theater |
| July 5, 2009 | Edmonton | Canada | The Starlite Room |
| July 6, 2009 | Calgary | Canada | The Whiske |
| July 7, 2009 | Spokane | United States | Knitting Factory |
| July 9, 2009 | Minneapolis | United States | First Ave |
| July 10, 2009 | Milwaukee | United States | The Rave |
| July 11, 2009 | Birch Run | United States | DirtFest |
| July 12, 2009 | Lakewood | United States | Phantasy Concert Club |
| July 13, 2009 | Chicago | United States | House of Blues |
| July 14, 2009 | Cincinnati | United States | Bogart's |
| July 15, 2009 | Toronto | Canada | Sound Academy |
| July 16, 2009 | Montreal | Canada | Medley |
| July 17, 2009 | Albany | United States | Northern Lights |
| July 18, 2009 | Worcester | United States | The Palladium |
| July 19, 2009 | New York City | United States | Irving Plaza |
| July 20, 2009 | New York City | United States | Irving Plaza |

== 2010 ==
Headliner:

- Decapitated

Supporting bands:

- The Faceless
- All Shall Perish
- The Red Chord
- Veil of Maya
- Decrepit Birth
- Cephalic Carnage
- Carnifex
- Animals As Leaders
- Vital Remains

Tour dates:

| Date | City | Country | Venue |
|---|---|---|---|
| July 17, 2010 | San Diego | United States | Soma |
| July 18, 2010 | Los Angeles | United States | House of Blues |
| July 19, 2010 | Tempe | United States | Marquee |
| July 20, 2010 | El Paso | United States | Club 101 |
| July 21, 2010 | San Antonio | United States | White Rabbit |
| July 22, 2010 | Austin | United States | Emo's |
| July 23, 2010 | Fort Worth | United States | Ridglea Theatre |
| July 24, 2010 | Houston | United States | Warsaw Ballroom |
| July 26, 2010 | Fort Lauderdale | United States | Revolution |
| July 27, 2010 | Atlanta | United States | The Masquerade |
| July 28, 2010 | Raleigh | United States | Volume 11 |
| July 29, 2010 | Philadelphia | United States | TLA (Theatre of Living Arts) |
| July 30, 2010 | Baltimore | United States | Sonar |
| July 31, 2010 | Worcester | United States | The Palladium |
| August 1, 2010 | New York City | United States | Irving Plaza |
| August 2, 2010 | Quebec City | Canada | Imperial |
| August 3, 2010 | Montreal | Canada | Club Soda |
| August 4, 2010 | Toronto | Canada | Opera House |
| August 5, 2010 | Cleveland | United States | Peabody's |
| August 6, 2010 | Cincinnati | United States | Bogart's |
| August 7, 2010 | Detroit | United States | Harpos |
| August 8, 2010 | Milwaukee | United States | The Rave |
| August 9, 2010 | Chicago | United States | House of Blues |
| August 10, 2010 | Minneapolis | United States | First Ave |
| August 11, 2010 | Indianapolis | United States | Emerson Theatre |
| August 13, 2010 | Denver | United States | Summit Music Hall |
| August 14, 2010 | Salt Lake City | United States | Club Sound |
| August 16, 2010 | Calgary | Canada | Republik |
| August 17, 2010 | Edmonton | Canada | The Starlite Room |
| August 19, 2010 | Vancouver | Canada | Rickshaw Theatre |
| August 20, 2010 | Seattle | United States | Studio Seven |
| August 21, 2010 | Portland | United States | Roseland Theatre |
| August 23, 2010 | San Francisco | United States | The Fillmore |

== 2010 (Mexico) ==
Headliners

- Job for a Cowboy

Support bands

- Winds of Plague
- The Faceless
- The Acacia Strain
- As Blood Runs Black
- Veil of Maya

Tour dates

| Date | City | Country | Venue |
|---|---|---|---|
| August 27, 2010 | Monterrey | Mexico | Cafe Iguana |
| August 28, 2010 | Mexico City | Mexico | Circo Volador |
| August 29, 2010 | Tijuana | Mexico | El Foro |

== 2011 ==
Headliners:

- The Black Dahlia Murder
- Whitechapel

Supporting bands:

- Darkest Hour
- Six Feet Under
- Dying Fetus
- The Faceless (Texas dates only)
- As Blood Runs Black
- Oceano
- Fleshgod Apocalypse
- Powerglove
- Within the Ruins

Tour dates:

| Date | City | Country | Venue |
|---|---|---|---|
| July 22, 2011 | Los Angeles | United States | House of Blues |
| July 23, 2011 | Anaheim | United States | The Grove |
| July 25, 2011 | Portland | United States | Roseland Theatre |
| July 26, 2011 | Seattle | United States | King Cat Theatre |
| July 27, 2011 | Boise | United States | The Knitting Factory |
| July 28, 2011 | Sacramento | United States | Ace of Spades |
| July 29, 2011 | San Francisco | United States | The Fillmore |
| July 30, 2011 | San Diego | United States | House of Blues |
| July 31, 2011 | Scottsdale | United States | Venue of Scottsdale |
| August 1, 2011 | Albuquerque | United States | Sunshine Theater |
| August 2, 2011 | Denver | United States | Summit Music Hall |
| August 4, 2011 | Louisville | United States | Expo Five |
| August 5, 2011 | Detroit | United States | St. Andrews |
| August 6, 2011 | Milwaukee | United States | The Rave |
| August 7, 2011 | Cleveland | United States | House of Blues |
| August 8, 2011 | Chicago | United States | House of Blues |
| August 9, 2011 | Toronto | Canada | Sound Academy |
| August 10, 2011 | Montreal | Canada | Olympia |
| August 11, 2011 | New York City | United States | Irving Plaza |
| August 12, 2011 | Worcester | United States | The Palladium |
| August 13, 2011 | Philadelphia | United States | Theatre of Living Arts |
| August 14, 2011 | Sayreville | United States | Starland Ballroom |
| August 15, 2011 | Washington, D.C. | United States | 9:30 Club |
| August 16, 2011 | Atlanta | United States | The Masquerade |
| August 17, 2011 | Fort Lauderdale | United States | Revolution |
| August 19, 2011 | Houston | United States | House of Blues |
| August 20, 2011 | San Antonio | United States | Backstage Live |
| August 21, 2011 | Dallas | United States | House of Blues |

== 2012 ==
Headliners:

- Cannibal Corpse
- Between the Buried and Me

Supporting bands:

- The Faceless
- Periphery
- Veil of Maya
- Job for a Cowboy
- Goatwhore
- Exhumed
- Cerebral Bore

Tour dates

| Date | City | Country | Venue |
|---|---|---|---|
| July 20, 2012 | Los Angeles | United States | House of Blues |
| July 21, 2012 | San Diego | United States | SOMA |
| July 22, 2012 | Las Vegas | United States | House of Blues |
| July 23, 2012 | Scottsdale | United States | Venue of Scottsdale |
| July 25, 2012 | Dallas | United States | House of Blues |
| July 26, 2012 | San Antonio | United States | White Rabbit |
| July 27, 2012 | Mission | United States | Pharr Events Center |
| July 28, 2012 | Houston | United States | House of Blues |
| July 30, 2012 | Tampa | United States | The Ritz |
| July 31, 2012 | Fort Lauderdale | United States | Revolution |
| August 1, 2012 | Atlanta | United States | The Masquerade |
| August 2, 2012 | Knoxville | United States | The Valarium |
| August 3, 2012 | Charlotte | United States | Amos Southend |
| August 4, 2012 | Richmond | United States | The National |
| August 5, 2012 | Philadelphia | United States | The Trocadero |
| August 7, 2012 | Sayreville | United States | Starland Ballroom |
| August 8, 2012 | New York City | United States | Irving Plaza |
| August 9, 2012 | Albany | United States | Northern Lights |
| August 10, 2012 | Worcester | United States | The Palladium |
| August 11, 2012 | Montreal | Canada | Heavy Montreal |
| August 12, 2012 | Toronto | Canada | Heavy Toronto |
| August 14, 2012 | Cleveland | United States | House of Blues |
| August 15, 2012 | Detroit | United States | St. Andrew's |
| August 16, 2012 | Chicago | United States | House Blues |
| August 17, 2012 | Milwaukee | United States | The Rave |
| August 18, 2012 | Saint Paul | United States | Station 4 |
| August 20, 2012 | Denver | United States | Summit Music Hall |
| August 22, 2012 | Seattle | United States | The Showbox Sodo |
| August 23, 2012 | Portland | United States | Roseland Theater |
| August 24, 2012 | San Francisco | United States | The Fillmore |
| August 25, 2012 | Anaheim | United States | The Grove |

== 2013 ==
Headliner:

- The Dillinger Escape Plan

Supporting bands:

- Animals As Leaders
- Periphery
- Norma Jean
- Cattle Decapitation
- The Ocean
- Revocation
- Aeon
- Rings of Saturn
- Thy Art Is Murder

Tour dates:

| Date | City | Country | Venue |
|---|---|---|---|
| July 19, 2013 | San Francisco | United States | The Regency |
| July 20, 2013 | Los Angeles | United States | House of Blues |
| July 21, 2013 | Santa Ana | United States | The Observatory |
| July 24, 2013 | Oklahoma City | United States | Diamond Ballroom |
| July 25, 2013 | Austin | United States | Historic Scoot Inn |
| July 26, 2013 | Dallas | United States | House of Blues |
| July 27, 2013 | Houston | United States | House of Blues |
| July 29, 2013 | Orlando | United States | House of Blues (w/o Cattle Decapitation and Thy Art Is Murder) |
| July 30, 2013 | Atlanta | United States | The Masquerade |
| July 31, 2013 | Knoxville | United States | NV Nightclub |
| August 1, 2013 | Myrtle Beach | United States | House of Blues |
| August 2, 2013 | Silver Spring | United States | The Fillmore |
| August 3, 2013 | Worcester | United States | The Palladium (w/o Norma Jean) |
| August 4, 2013 | Philadelphia | United States | The Trocadero |
| August 7, 2013 | New York City | United States | Best Buy Theater |
| August 8, 2013 | Toronto | Canada | Sound Academy |
| August 9, 2013 | Montreal | Canada | Metropolis |
| August 10, 2013 | Albany | United States | Upstate Concert Hall |
| August 11, 2013 | Detroit | United States | Majestic Theatre |
| August 12, 2013 | Chicago | United States | House of Blues |
| August 13, 2013 | Milwaukee | United States | The Rave |
| August 14, 2013 | Minneapolis | United States | The Cabooze |
| August 16, 2013 | Denver | United States | Ogden Theatre |
| August 17, 2013 | Salt Lake City | United States | The Complex |
| August 19, 2013 | Seattle | United States | Studio Seven |
| August 20, 2013 | Portland | United States | Roseland Ballroom |

== 2014 ==
Headliner:

- Morbid Angel

Supporting bands:

- Dying Fetus
- The Faceless
- Thy Art Is Murder
- Goatwhore
- Origin
- Decrepit Birth
- Within the Ruins
- Fallujah
- Boreworm

Tour dates:

| Date | City | Country | Venue |
|---|---|---|---|
| July 17, 2014 | San Francisco | United States | The Regency Ballroom (no Morbid Angel due to bus breakdown) |
| July 18, 2014 | Santa Ana | United States | The Observatory |
| July 19, 2014 | Los Angeles | United States | House of Blues |
| July 20, 2014 | Phoenix | United States | Nile Theater |
| July 21, 2014 | El Paso | United States | Tricky Falls |
| July 22, 2014 | Albuquerque | United States | Sunshine Theater |
| July 23, 2014 | Denver | United States | Summit |
| July 25, 2014 | Houston | United States | House of Blues |
| July 26, 2014 | Austin | United States | Scoot Inn |
| July 27, 2014 | Dallas | United States | GMBG |
| July 29, 2014 | St. Petersburg | United States | State Theater |
| July 30, 2014 | Atlanta | United States | The Masquerade |
| July 31, 2014 | Knoxville | United States | The International |
| August 1, 2014 | Cleveland | United States | Agora Theatre |
| August 2, 2014 | Chicago | United States | Mojoes |
| August 3, 2014 | Minneapolis | United States | Skyway Theatre |
| August 5, 2014 | Milwaukee | United States | The Rave |
| August 6, 2014 | Detroit | United States | Crofoot Ballroom |
| August 7, 2014 | Niagara Falls | United States | Rapids Theatre |
| August 8, 2014 | New York City | United States | Irving Plaza |
| August 9, 2014 | Worcester | United States | The Palladium |
| August 10, 2014 | Philadelphia | United States | The Trocadero |
| August 12, 2014 | Springfield | United States | Empire (no Morbid Angel) |

== 2014 (Canada) ==
Headliner:

- The Faceless

Supporting bands:

- Rings of Saturn
- Archspire
- Fallujah
- Fatality (8/14-8/20)
- Black Crown Initiate

Tour dates:

| Date | City | Country | Venue |
|---|---|---|---|
| August 14, 2014 | Quebec City | Canada | Dagobert |
| August 15, 2014 | Montreal | Canada | Les Foufounes Electriques |
| August 16, 2014 | Toronto | Canada | Mod Club |
| August 17, 2014 | Jonquière | Canada | Salle Nikitoutagan |
| August 18, 2014 | Trois-Rivières | Canada | Rock Cafe |
| August 19, 2014 | Sherbrooke | Canada | Le Magog |
| August 20, 2014 | Ottawa | Canada | Babylon Nightclub |
| August 23, 2014 | Edmonton | Canada | Pawn Shop |
| August 24, 2014 | Kelowna | Canada | Sapphire Nightclub |
| August 25, 2014 | Vancouver | Canada | Rickshaw Theater |
| August 26, 2014 | Seattle | United States | Studio Seven |
| August 27, 2014 | Portland | United States | Hawthorne Theater |
| August 28, 2014 | Santa Cruz | United States | The Catalyst |

== 2015 ==
Headliner:

- Arch Enemy

Supporting bands:

- Born of Osiris
- Veil of Maya
- The Acacia Strain
- Cattle Decapitation
- Beyond Creation

Obscura and After the Burial were originally scheduled to appear on the tour. Obscura dropped off due to visa issues and After the Burial dropped off due to the death of their guitarist Justin Lowe.

Tour dates:

| Date | City | Country | Venue |
|---|---|---|---|
| July 28, 2015 | Denver | United States | Summit Music Hall |
| July 30, 2015 | Des Moines | United States | Val Air Ballroom |
| July 31, 2015 | Minneapolis | United States | Skyway Theater |
| August 1, 2015 | Joliet | United States | Mojoes |
| August 2, 2015 | Cleveland | United States | The Agora Theater |
| August 5, 2015 | Philadelphia | United States | Electric Factory |
| August 6, 2015 | Hamilton | Canada | Club 77 |
| August 7, 2015 | Montreal | Canada | Heavy MTL |
| August 8, 2015 | Worcester | United States | The Palladium |
| August 9, 2015 | Sayreville | United States | Starland Ballroom |
| August 11, 2015 | Winston-Salem | United States | Ziggys |
| August 12, 2015 | New York City | United States | Webster Hall w/The All Stars Tour |
| August 13, 2015 | Baltimore | United States | Rams Head Live |
| August 15, 2015 | Knoxville | United States | The International |
| August 17, 2015 | Dallas | United States | Gas Monkey Live! |
| August 18, 2015 | Austin | United States | Empire Control Room & Garage |
| August 20, 2015 | Tempe | United States | The Marquee |
| August 21, 2015 | San Diego | United States | House of Blues |
| August 22, 2015 | Anaheim | United States | City National Grove of Anaheim |
| August 23, 2015 | San Francisco | United States | The Regency Ballroom |

== 2016 ==
Headliner:

- Cannibal Corpse

Supporting bands:

- Nile
- After the Burial
- Suffocation
- Carnifex
- Revocation
- Krisiun
- Slaughter to Prevail
- Ingested
- Enterprise Earth

== 2017 ==
Headliners:

- The Black Dahlia Murder
- Dying Fetus

Supporting bands:

- The Faceless
- Oceano
- Origin
- Rings of Saturn
- Betraying the Martyrs
- Lorna Shore
- AngelMaker

The Black Dahlia Murder will play their 2007 album Nocturnal in its entirety for their 10th anniversary.

AngelMaker was voted in by fans during the Summer Slaughter Poll.

Slaughter to Prevail were initially announced on the bill, but their visas were denied and they could not make the tour.

== 2018 ==
Headliner:

- Between the Buried and Me

Supporting bands:

- Born of Osiris
- Veil of Maya
- Erra
- The Agony Scene
- Allegaeon
- Terror Universal
- Soreption
- Entheos

Soreption only played a few tour dates and then dropped off due to unforeseen circumstances.

== 2019 ==
Co-Headliners

- Cattle Decapitation
- Carnifex
- The Faceless

Support bands:

- Rivers of Nihil
- Nekrogoblikon
- Lorna Shore
- Brand of Sacrifice

== 2024 ==
Co-Headliners

- Veil of Maya
- Brand of Sacrifice

Support bands:

- Gideon
- Left to Suffer
- Within Destruction
- Ten56.
- Tallah
- Cabal
- Brat
- Filth

== 2025 ==
Headliner:

- Hatebreed

Support bands:

- Bleeding Through
- Fugitive
- Malevolence
- Gridiron
- Escuela Grind
- Snuffed On Sight
- Incite

== 2026 ==
=== Leg 1 (July) ===
Headliner:

- Hatebreed

Support bands:

- Devourment (July 2 – July 15)
- Incantation (July 19 – July 24)
- Snuffed On Sight
- The Last Ten Seconds of Life
- Face Yourself

=== Leg 2 (August – September) ===
Headliner:

- Hatebreed

Support bands:

- Terror
- Incantation
- Gates to Hell
- Torture
- Creeping Death

== The Slaughter Survivors Tour 2011 (North America) ==
Headliner:

- Conducting From The Grave

Support bands:

- The Contortionist
- Scale the Summit
- Rings of Saturn
- Volumes
- Structures

Tour dates

| Date | City | Country | Venue |
|---|---|---|---|
| July 22, 2011 | Tucson | United States | The Rock |
| July 23, 2011 | Gallup | United States | The Juggernaut |
| July 24, 2011 | Lubbock | United States | Jake's |
| July 25, 2011 | Austin | United States | Emo's |
| July 27, 2011 | Orlando | United States | Firestone |
| July 28, 2011 | St. Petersburg | United States | State Theatre |
| July 29, 2011 | Atlanta | United States | Masquerade |
| July 30, 2011 | Springfield | United States | Jaxx |
| July 31, 2011 | Trenton | United States | Backstage at Champs |
| August 3, 2011 | Wilmington | United States | Mojo 13 |
| August 4, 2011 | Amityville | United States | Broadway Bar |
| August 5, 2011 | Holyoke | United States | Waterfront Tavern |
| August 6, 2011 | Amsterdam | United States | Elks Hall 101 |
| August 7, 2011 | Jermyn | United States | Eleanor Rigby's |
| August 8, 2011 | Covington | United States | Mad Hatter |
| August 10, 2011 | Indianapolis | United States | Emerson Theater |
| August 11, 2011 | Steger | United States | Another Hole in the Wall |
| August 12, 2011 | Saint Paul | United States | Station 4 |
| August 13, 2011 | Des Moines | United States | People's Court |
| August 14, 2011 | Omaha | United States | Sokol Underground |
| August 15, 2011 | Denver | United States | Marquis Theater |
| August 16, 2011 | Salt Lake City | United States | In The Venue |
| August 18, 2011 | Anaheim | United States | Chain Reaction |
| August 19, 2011 | Sacramento | United States | The Boardwalk |
| August 20, 2011 | Sparks | United States | The Alley |

== The Slaughter Survivors Tour 2012 (North America) ==
Headliner:

- Pathology

Support bands:

- Enfold Darkness
- Fallujah
- Fit for an Autopsy
- Aegaeon

Tour dates

| Date | City | Country | Venue |
|---|---|---|---|
| July 21, 2012 | Santa Cruz | United States | The Atrium |
| July 22, 2012 | Portland | United States | Branx |
| July 23, 2012 | Seattle | United States | Studio Seven |
| July 24, 2012 | Boise | United States | The Venue |
| July 26, 2012 | Denver | United States | Marquis Theater |
| July 27, 2012 | Salina | United States | The Factory |
| July 28, 2012 | Des Moines | United States | Vaudeville Mews |
| July 29, 2012 | Saint Paul | United States | Station 4 |
| July 30, 2012 | Green Bay | United States | The Hideout |
| July 31, 2012 | Joliet | United States | Mojoes |
| August 1, 2012 | Cleveland | United States | Peabody's |
| August 2, 2012 | Danbury | United States | Heirloom Arts |
| August 3, 2012 | Smithtown | United States | Masonic Temple |
| August 4, 2012 | Trenton | United States | Backstage at Champs |
| August 5, 2012 | Wilmington | United States | Mojo 13 |
| August 6, 2012 | New York City | United States | Studio at Webster Hall |
| August 7, 2012 | Springfield | United States | Empire |
| August 8, 2012 | Richmond | United States | Kingdom |
| August 9, 2012 | Wilmington | United States | Soapbox Laundro-Lounge |
| August 11, 2012 | Tampa | United States | Brass Mug |
| August 13, 2012 | Houston | United States | Warehouse Live |
| August 14, 2012 | San Antonio | United States | Korova |
| August 15, 2012 | Albuquerque | United States | El Rey Theater |
| August 17, 2012 | Tempe | United States | Rocky Point |
| August 18, 2012 | Temecula | United States | The Vault |
| August 19, 2012 | Los Angeles | United States | The Whisky |

== Fan-voted openers ==
In 2011, the Summer Slaughter Tour offered their fans the opportunity to vote on who would open the tour. The choices for 2011 were Dawn of Ashes, Revocation, Neuraxis, Conducting From The Grave, The Contortionist, Within The Ruins, Volumes, Augury, 7 Horns 7 Eyes, Rings of Saturn, and Struc/tures. Within the Ruins ultimately received the most votes and thus won the opening spot for the tour. That same year Conducting From The Grave, The Contortionist, Rings of Saturn, Volumes, and Struc/tures all toured together on what was billed as the Slaughter Survivors Tour. This tour also included Scale the Summit, who had not been part of the voting.

For the 2012 edition of the Summer Slaughter Tour, fans were once again given the chance to vote on the opening act. The choices for 2012 were Aegaeon, Battlecross, Cerebral Bore, Enfold Darkness, Fallujah, Fit for an Autopsy, Hour of Penance, I Declare War, Pathology, and Vildhjarta. The opening slot for the 2012 tour went to Cerebral Bore, and Pathology, Enfold Darkness, Fallujah, Fit for an Autopsy, and Aegaeon also joined the 2012 Slaughter Survivors Tour.

The choices for the 2013 tour were Abiotic, As They Burn, Dark Sermon, Erra, Fit for an Autopsy, Howl, Intervals, Into the Flood, King Conquer, Last Chance To Reason, My Bitter End, Nekrogoblikon, Rings of Saturn, Syqem, Soreption, Today I Caught the Plague, and Thy Art Is Murder. Thy Art Is Murder was the chosen band. However, since they were nearly tied with Rings of Saturn by a few votes, the organizers decided to put both Rings of Saturn and Thy Art Is Murder on the bill. Vektor were put on the initial ballot by their record label without the band's knowledge or approval, and upon discovering this, had to withdraw due to incompatible scheduling. The Slaughter Survivors Tour did not occur in 2013, and did not return in 2014 either.

Summer Slaughter 2014 didn't see the tour offer an opportunity to vote on openers; rather, the opener was chosen by Headbang for the Highway showcase, and Boreworm was selected. Mayhem Festival also uses the Headbang for the Highway showcase to select bands.

== Most appearances at The Summer Slaughter Tour ==
- The Faceless (11)
- Dying Fetus (6)
- Born of Osiris (6)
- Veil of Maya (6)
- As Blood Runs Black (4)
- Cattle Decapitation (4)
- Necrophagist (4)
- Rings of Saturn (4)
- Beneath the Massacre (3)
- The Black Dahlia Murder (3)
- Carnifex (3)
- Decrepit Birth (3)
- Origin (3)
- Whitechapel (3)
