= Ingested (band) =

English deathcore band from Manchester

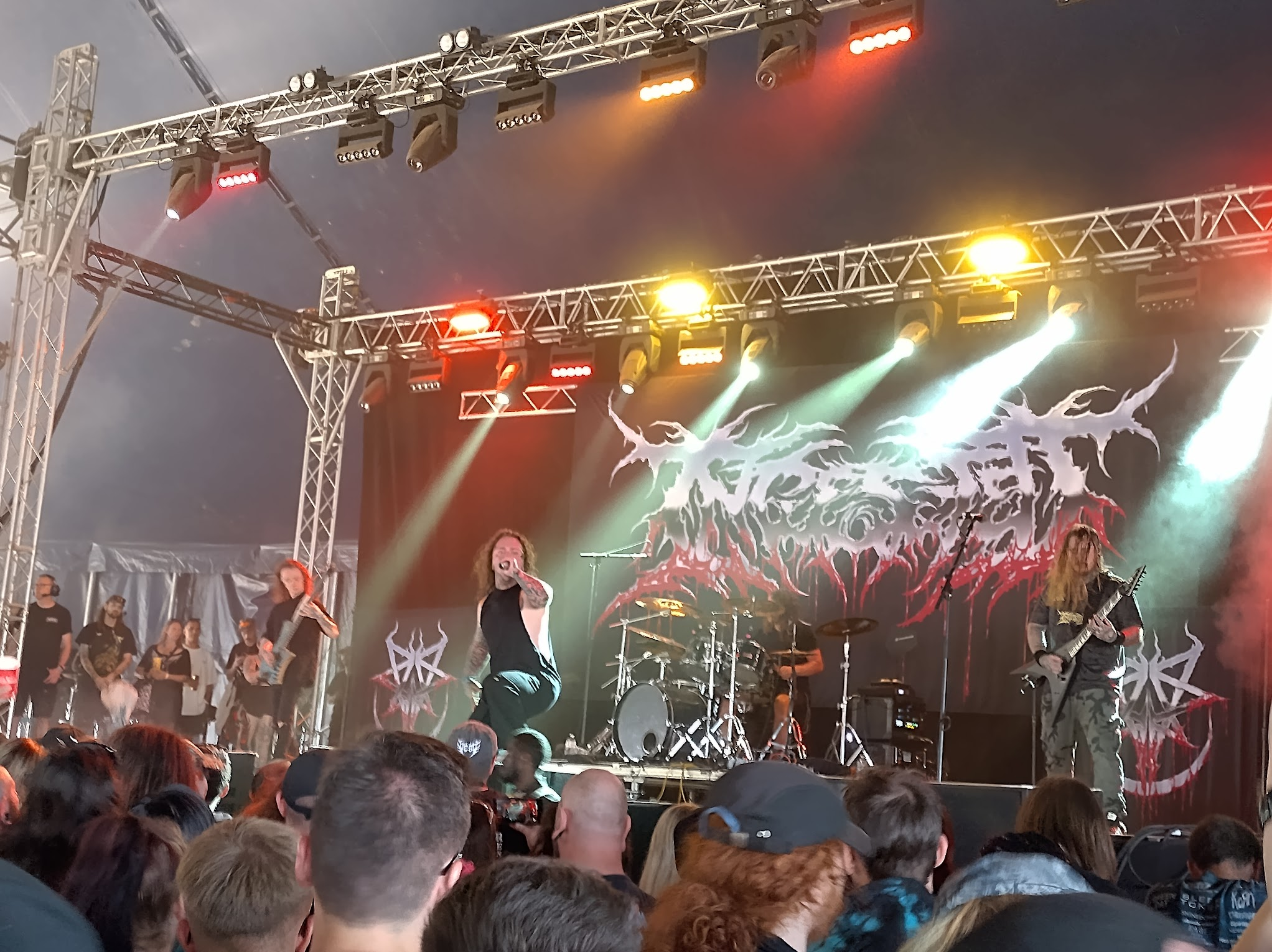
- Ingested performing live at Download Festival 2025

Background information
- Origin: Manchester, England
- Genres: Deathcore; brutal death metal
- Years active: 2006–present
- Labels: Grindethic; Candlelight; Siege of Amida; Century Media; Unique Leader; Metal Blade
- Members: Sean Hynes; Lyn Jeffs; Andrew Virrueta
- Past members: Brad Fuller; Sam Yates; Jason Evans; Josh Davies; Thomas O'Malley
- Website: ingested.co.uk

Ingested is an English deathcore band from Manchester, formed in 2006. The band currently consists of guitarists Sean Hynes and Andrew Virrueta and drummer Lyn Jeffs. The band has released eight studio albums, the latest being Denigration in 2026 via Metal Blade Records.

== History ==
=== Formation and early years (2006–2012) ===
Formed in Manchester, England in May 2006, the group consisted of lead vocalist Jason Evans, drummer Lyn Jeffs, guitarists Sean Hynes and Sam Yates, and bassist Brad Fuller, who are all original members. Hynes and Jeffs formerly played in the deathcore band Annotations of an Autopsy. Yates, Hynes, and Evans formerly played in the death metal band Age of Suffering.

After signing to Candlelight Records and Siege of Amida Records, Ingested released their debut album, Surpassing the Boundaries of Human Suffering, in June 2009.

In 2010, Ingested toured Europe for the first time as part of the Bonecrusher Fest, which was headlined by The Black Dahlia Murder and supported by Carnifex, 3 Inches of Blood and the Faceless. Tours with bands like Annotations of an Autopsy and Martyr Defiled and festival appearances at Ghostfest and Extremefest followed.

In 2011, Ingested released their second record, The Surreption, via Siege of Amida.

=== The Architect of Extinction and The Level Above Human (2013–2018) ===
An EP followed in 2013 called Revered by No One, Feared by All. After signing to Century Media, the band released their third full-length album, The Architect of Extinction, in 2015.

The band's first US tour was in the autumn of 2015 on the Devastation on the Nation tour. They supported other extreme metal bands like Origin, Krisiun, Aeon, Alterbeast, and Soreption. In 2016, Ingested toured North America for the second time, as part of the annual Summer Slaughter Tour.

In 2016, Ingested signed to Unique Leader Records, which released their fourth LP, The Level Above Human, in April 2018.

It was announced Ingested would return to North America, including their first appearance in Mexico, in mid-2018, followed by another European tour in support of their fourth record, The Level Above Human. In support for The Level Above Human, the band did their first full USA headliner in the Spring of 2018 with Signs of the Swarm and Bodysnatcher. They also played on the 2018 Devastation on the Nation tour with bands like Aborted, Psycroptic, Disentomb, Venom Prison, Vale of Pnath, and Arkaik.

Ingested returned to Europe in September 2018, opening for Crowbar. Ingested also did their second headliner in the United States, known as the "Evisceratour", in late 2018. Enterprise Earth, I Declare War, Bodysnatcher, Aether, and I AM joined as support.

=== Where Only Gods May Tread, Ashes Lie Still, The Tide of Death and Fractured Dreams and lineup changes (2019–2025) ===
In 2019, Ingested supported Cryptopsy on their spring European tour. Incite, Demonical, Nightrage, and Gloryhole Guillotine joined the lineup as well. In April and May 2019, Ingested supported The Black Dahlia Murder on their European and UK tour. Ingested opened for Despised Icon on their fall 2019 tour in the United States. Kublai Khan and Shadow of Intent joined as support. Ingested toured Europe in November 2019 on their "Decade Of Human Suffering" Tour, performing Surpassing the Boundaries of Human Suffering in its entirety. Within Destruction, Signs of the Swarm, and Distant accompanied them on this tour.

The band's fifth studio album, Where Only Gods May Tread, was released on 14 August 2020. Metal Hammer named it the 44th best metal album of 2020. On 30 July 2021, Ingested released The Surreption II, a fully re-recorded version of their second album. On 3 August 2022, the band released a single titled "Shadows in Time", from their sixth studio album, Ashes Lie Still, which was released on 4 November, 2022. Ingested supported Cannibal Corpse on their spring tour of Europe along with Dark Funeral. On 18 January 2024, the band released a single titled "Paragon of Purity", from their seventh studio album, The Tide of Death and Fractured Dreams, which was released on 5 April 2024.

On 25 November 2024, the band parted ways with vocalist and founding member Jason Evans. In December 2024, the band revealed Josh Davies as their new vocalist. On 11 February 2025, the band released a new single, "Altar of Flesh", the first to feature Davies. It was also announced that touring musicians Andrew Virrueta and Thomas O’Malley had joined the band as full-time members.

=== Denigration (2026–present) ===
On 12 February 2026, the band released a new single, "Merciless Reflection", and announced their eighth studio album, Denigration, set for release on 8 May. Six days later, the band announced they had parted ways with Josh Davies, though a reason was not given for his departure. The band stated that Davies would be replaced by Adam Mercer from Deathstroke for their upcoming tour. On 9 March, the band announced that they would proceed with releasing their new album, Denigration, with Davies' recordings removed and all vocals being re-recorded by guitarists Sean Hynes and Andrew Virrueta on both digital and physical releases. They also confirmed they were searching for a new frontman.

On 31 May 2026, bassist Thomas O'Malley announced he had left the band.

== Band members ==
Current

- Sean Hynes – guitars, backing vocals (2006–present)
- Lyn Jeffs – drums (2006–present)
- Andrew Virrueta – guitars, backing vocals (2025–present; touring 2023–2025)

Former

- Brad Fuller – bass (2006–2019)
- Sam Yates – guitars, backing vocals (2006–2021)
- Jason Evans – lead vocals (2006–2024)
- Josh Davies – lead vocals (2024–2026)
- Thomas O'Malley – bass (2025–2026; touring 2022–2025)

Live

- Mike Barber – guitars, backing vocals (2023–2025)
- Adam Mercer – lead vocals (2026–present)

Studio

- Dom Grimard – bass (2019–2025)

Timeline

== Discography ==
=== Studio albums ===
- Surpassing the Boundaries of Human Suffering (2009)
- The Surreption (2011)
- The Architect of Extinction (2015)
- The Level Above Human (2018)
- Where Only Gods May Tread (2020)
- The Surreption II (2021) (re-recording of 2011's The Surreption)
- Ashes Lie Still (2022)
- The Tide of Death and Fractured Dreams (2024)
- Denigration (2026)

=== EPs ===
- Revered by No One, Feared by All (2013)
- Call of the Void (2019)
- Stinking Cesspool of Liquefied Human Remnants (2021)

=== Collaboration albums ===
- North-West Slam Fest (2007) (with Crepitation and Kastrated)
