= Awaken to the Suffering =

Studio album by Pathology
- Released: September 13, 2011
- Recorded: June 27 – July 25, 2011
- Studio: Lambesis Studios
- Genres: Brutal death metal; Slam death metal; Melodic death metal
- Length: 31:13
- Label: Victory
- Producer: Daniel Castleman

Pathology chronology
Legacy of the Ancients (2010)	Awaken to the Suffering (2011)	The Time of Great Purification (2012)

Awaken to the Suffering is the fourth studio album by the death metal band Pathology from San Diego. It was released by Victory on September 13, 2011.

It is the first album by the band to feature Jonathan Huber who was formerly the vocalist of the Washington-based deathcore band I Declare War. After recording one more album; "The Time of Great Purification", Huber left the band in December 2012.

== Track listing ==
No.	Title	Length
1.	"Dissected by Righteousness"	3:40
2.	"Ingestion of Creation" (featuring A.J. Magana of Deprecated)	2:52
3.	"Hostility Towards Conformity"	2:35
4.	"Media Consumption"	2:12
5.	"Society's Desolation" (featuring Obie Flett of Inherit Disease)	3:02
6.	"Prolonging the Suffering" (instrumental)	1:13
7.	"A Perverse Existence"	2:02
8.	"Humanity's Cesspool"	3:58
9.	"Festering in Filth" (featuring A.J. Magana of Deprecated)	1:47
10.	"Opposing Globalization"	3:05
11.	"Emesis"	3:36
12.	"Revocation of Earth" (instrumental)	1:10
Total length:		31:13

== Personnel ==
Pathology

- Jonathan Huber – vocals
- Tim Tiszczenko – guitar
- Kevin Schwartz – guitar
- Oscar Ramirez – bass
- Dave Astor – drums

Production

- Producer – Daniel Castleman
- Mastering – Alan Douches
- Artwork – Par Olofsson
