= Cerebral Bore =

Scottish brutal death metal band

- Origin: Glasgow, Scotland, United Kingdom
- Genre: Brutal death metal
- Years active: 2006–2014
- Label: Earache Records
- Members: Paul McGuire; Allan MacDonald
- Past members: Simone Pluijmers; Kyle Rutherford
- Website: Cerebral Bore on Facebook

Cerebral Bore was a Scottish brutal death metal band from Glasgow, formed in 2006.

The band comprises guitarist Paul McGuire, drummer Allan "McDibet" MacDonald and bassist Federico Benini. Cerebral Bore released a debut album, Maniacal Miscreation, in 2011 via Earache Records and have toured in United States, Europe, Russia, Israel, Mexico and India.

Blabbermouth.net described the style of Cerebral Bore as "brutal death metal with personality and compositional diversity".

== History ==
Cerebral Bore formed in 2005 in Glasgow. The name of the band comes from a weapon featured in a video game called Turok 2: Seeds of Evil.

The original members were Marc Mullen (guitar), Ross Howie (vocals) and Jack Nelson (drums), followed by Ross Muir (bass).

In mid 2005 Jack Nelson was replaced with Allan McDonald on drums. They released an early 4 track demo recorded in Glasgow.

In late 2006 Paul McGuire formerly of Pathogen, joined the band, Short after McGuire's arrival, Marc and Ross Muir decided to leave the band due to argument over musical differences and other reasons not seeing eye to eye with McGuire.

The band would continue from there changing lineups with McGuire as guitarist and McDibet still in the fold. In 2006 McGuire redesigned the brand of Cerebral Bore.

In November 2006, the band released a demo named The Dead Flesh Architect. The band's first trip outside of the United Kingdom took place in August 2007 and included New York City, United States, after having a song played on metal radio in N.Y. Following a U.K. tour, the band toured in the United States again, supporting Suffocation, Brutal Truth, and Devourment. Throughout 2009, Cerebral Bore toured in continental Europe, Scandinavia and Russia.

In 2010, Cerebral Bore were joined by 18-year-old Dutch vocalist Simone "Som" Pluijmers. The debut album Maniacal Miscreation was recorded in mid-2010 and self-released in a limited edition of 500 copies. Touring in Europe and summer festivals continued in 2010. In December 2010, The band signed to Earache Records. The debut album was released in June 2011. Cerebral Bore released music videos for "The Bald Cadaver" and "Maniacal Miscreation".

Following the band's last concert of their headlining U.S. and Mexico tour in mid-2011, McGuire and Rutherford were falsely arrested and jailed by New York City police officers searching for a man who murdered four people in a Long Island pharmacy. Paul McGuire was also arrested for public intoxication. A week later, they were formally released without charge and flown back to Scotland. Cerebral Bore played in The Summer Slaughter Tour 2012 from 20 July through 25 August.

In November 2012, Pluijmers had left the band. The band commented: "Som walked out on us less than 24 hours before the U.S. tour (with Dying Fetus, Cattle Decapitation and Malignancy), and we were forced to either cancel or go ahead with it as an instrumental, if need be. We didn't want to let our U.S. fans down, so we went ahead with our buddy Shawn Whitaker on vocals for the tour." Pluijmers responded in a post that she left the band for her "own happiness and safety", alleging mistreatment by McGuire.

== Musical style ==
Allmusic commented the band's debut album that "combines death metal brutality with a surprising dose of melody and technical skill". Blabbermouth stated about Maniacal Miscreation: "It is brutal death metal (BDM) with personality and compositional diversity. (...) Budding BDM acts looking to avoid getting lost in the herd should take careful notes when listening to this one."

== Members ==
Current members

- Paul McGuire – guitars (2006–present)
- Allan "McDibet" MacDonald – drums (2006–present)
- Federico Benini – bass guitar (2012–present)

Past members

- Simone "Som" Pluijmers – vocals (2010– 2012)
- Kyle Rutherford – bass guitar (2009–2012)
- Phil Differ – bass guitar (2006–2007)
- Marc Mullen – guitar (2005)
- Ross Muir – bass guitar (2005)
- Ross Howie – vocals (2005, 2006–2008)
- David Culbert – vocals (2008–2010)
- Paddy Connoly – vocals (2008)
- Kyle Rutherford – bass (2009–2012)
- Chris Lewis – vocals (2006)
- Jack Nelson – drums (2005)

Live/touring members

- Shawn Whitaker – vocals (2012–2014)

== Discography ==
Studio albums

- Maniacal Miscreation (2011)

Extended plays & demos

- The Dead Flesh Architect (2006)

Singles

- 24 Year Party Dungeon (2009)
- Horrendous Acts of Iniquity (2012)
