= Pascual Romero =

American musician (born 1980)

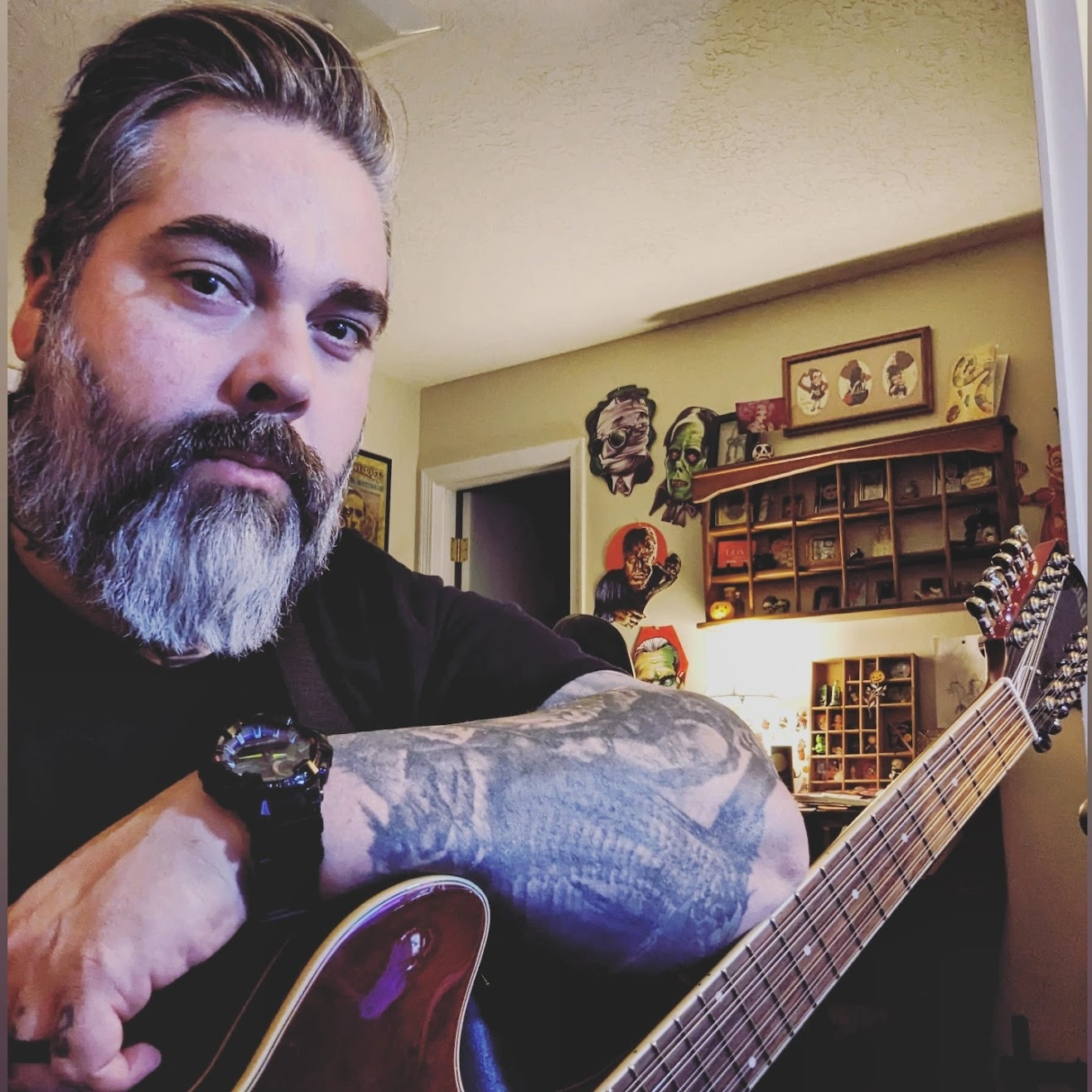
- Pascual Romero in 2023

Background information
- Born: January 6, 1980 (age 46); Madison, Wisconsin, U.S.
- Origin: Santa Fe, New Mexico, U.S.
- Genres: Heavy metal, grindcore, metalcore, progressive metal
- Occupations: Musician, film producer, actor, podcaster
- Instruments: Vocals, bass, guitar
- Years active: 1993–present

Pascual H. Romero (born January 6, 1980) is an American musician, podcaster, television and film producer from Santa Fe, New Mexico. Previously based out of Los Angeles, California, he is the former vocalist of the death metal band Pathology and former bassist of In This Moment. Romero is co-host of the Squaring the Strange podcast, along with paranormal investigator Ben Radford and caricature artist Celestia Ward.

== Career ==
Romero is the former bassist of the bands In This Moment, Tinhorn, Level-Zero, Public Recipe (with Tal B. of i5), and Warped Tour band Nothing Less. He is also the former vocalist of the death metal band Pathology. He is mentioned multiple times in the liner notes of the In This Moment albums Beautiful Tragedy and The Dream. as well as the Daysend album The Warning. Other projects include Divine Heresy, Throne of Ashes, Groamville, Buffalo Down, Black Veil Brides, My Empty Day, Kriya, Madcats, Dysphotic, Strangled By Strangulation, and he is a steadfast guest vocalist for industrial metal band Fear Factory. He was the promoter of The Hell in July tour in 2013 for the bands Six Feet Under and Decrepit Birth. Romero was the vocalist in the band Pathology from Summer 2009 until January 2010. As of 2018 he is in the doom metal band Devil's Throne which features his wife Ashley Romero on vocals.

In film and TV production, Romero is a producer and writer for Rad Girls, on which he also appears as himself. He has an extensive list of projects he has worked on; What About Brian, Pushing Daisies, Heroes, and the film 3:10 To Yuma are among his most notable credits. He was also credited as a producer for the Style Network. As of 2018, he is working with media companies Kronos Creative and Beautiful Idea.

=== Skepticism ===
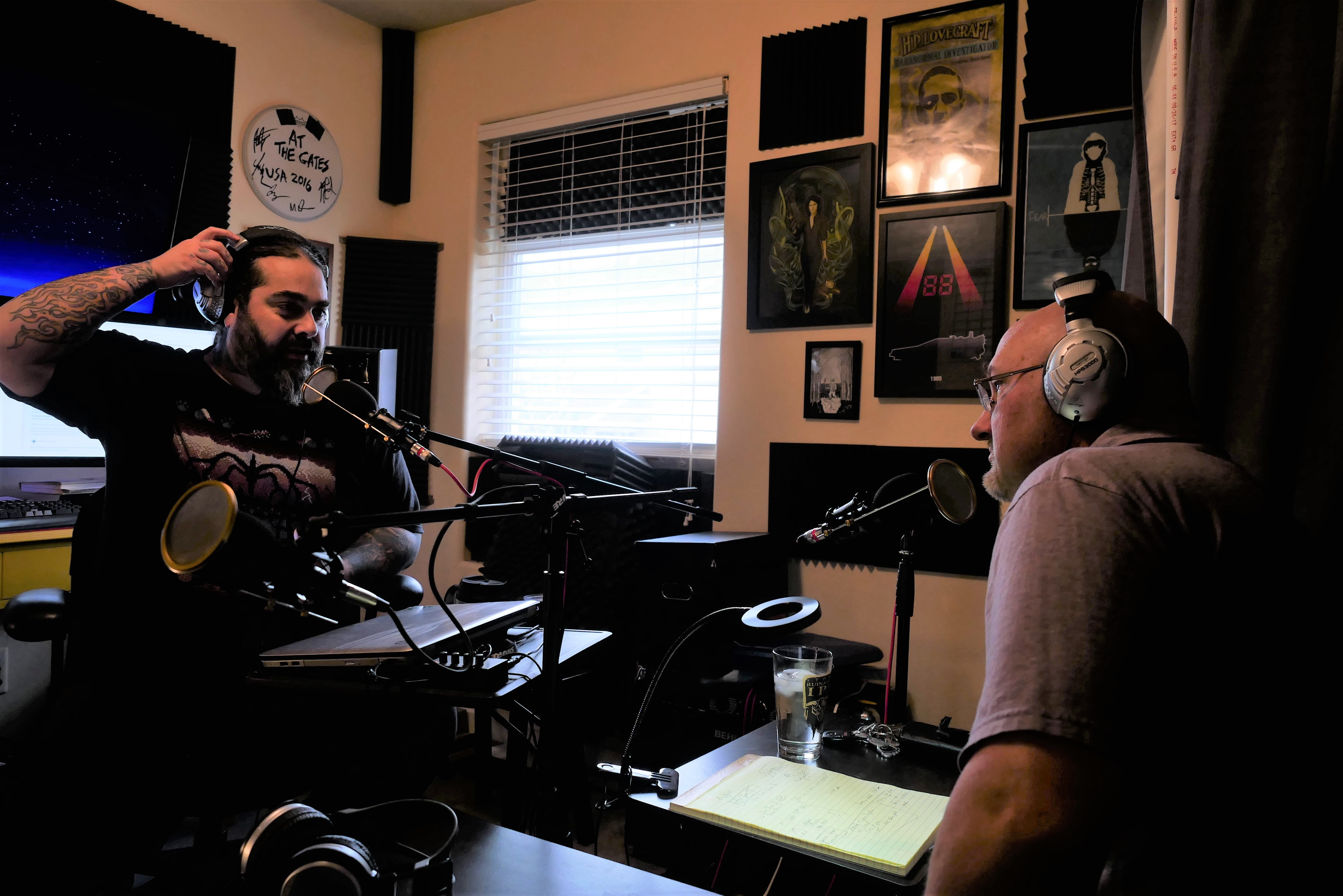
Pascual Romero and Ben Radford in studio recording an episode of the Squaring The Strange podcast

In April 2017, Romero and Ben Radford launched the Squaring the Strange podcast with evidence-based analysis and commentary on a variety of topics ranging from the paranormal to the political. Frequent contributor and content producer Celestia Ward was later added as a cohost. The podcast tackles a wide variety of subjects including psychology, myths, hoaxes, folklore, and science. Pascual has handled much of the audio editing work and provided original music for the show. As of 2019 Pascual is on semi-hiatus from the show due to professional and family obligations.

== Personal life ==
Romero was born in Madison, Wisconsin but grew up in Santa Fe. His mother is anthropologist Camille Belden. His grandfather was Eugene F. Romero, a Santa Fe City Councilman 1968–1972 who died March 31, 2010, one day after his wife Celia Quintana Romero, to whom he had been married for 67 years. His father, Hilario Romero is a civil rights activist, retired professor, state historian and musician; both Pascual and his father performed and recorded with New Mexican folk group Los Folkloricos de Nuevo Mexico.
