= With Passion =

American death metal band

- Origin: Sacramento, California, U.S.
- Genres: Technical death metal; melodic death metal; metalcore
- Years active: 2002–2007
- Labels: Earache Records

With Passion was an American extreme metal band from Sacramento, California. They were formed in 2002 and broke up in 2007.

== History ==
The band hails from Sacramento and was formed by Samuel Mcleod, Shaun Gier, Jeff Morgan, and Jacob Peete in mid-2002, but did not acquire a permanent bassist until 2003 with Michael Nordeen. Jeff Morgan later left the band and was replaced by Andrew Burt. Keyboardist Brandon Guadagnolo joined the band later on, and with this line-up the band released an EP, In the Midst of Bloodied Soil.

Jacob Pete, Andy Burt, Sam Mcleod and Brandon Guadagnolo left the band in the summer of 2005, and drummer Greg Donnelly and guitarist John Abernathy, both from Conducting from the Grave, joined in 2006. At this moment, the line-up consisted of no fewer than four former Conducting from the Grave members, the only exception being bassist Michael Nordeen. Later that year, vocalist Shaun Gier left the band and was replaced by Fidel Campos, just in time for the recording of their debut album.

The band released their debut album, In the Midst of Bloodied Soil, in 2005, with the same title as their EP, through Earache Records—the songs are the same as on the EP, with two additional tracks.

The band's second album, What We See When We Shut Our Eyes, was released in early 2007 on Earache, but the band broke up soon thereafter. Since then, Conducting from the Grave has reformed.

== Members ==
=== Final lineup ===
- Fidel Campos – vocals (2006–2007)
- John Abernathy – guitar (2006–2007)
- Jeff Morgan – guitar (2002–2003, 2006–2007)
- Steven Lovas – bass (2006–2007)
- Greg Donnelly – drums (2006–2007)

=== Former members ===
- Shaun Gier – guitar (2002–2006), vocals (2006)
- Jacob Peete – drums (2002–2004)
- Brandon Guadagnolo – keyboards (2004–2006)
- Sam Mcleod – vocals (2002–2006)
- Andy Burt – guitar (2003–2006)
- Justin Tvetan – drums (2004–2006)
- Michael Nordeen – bass (2003–2006)
- Joey Ellis – bass (2004)

Timeline

== Discography ==
- In the Midst of Bloodied Soil (CD, Earache, 2005)
- What We See When We Shut Our Eyes (CD, Earache, 2007)
