= Revenants (album) =

Studio album by Conducting from the Grave
- Released: October 25, 2010
- Recorded: March 2010
- Genre: Deathcore, melodic death metal, technical death metal
- Length: 44:19
- Label: Sumerian
- Producer: Conducting from the Grave

Conducting from the Grave chronology
When Legends Become Dust (2009)	Revenants (2010)	Conducting from the Grave (2013)

Professional ratings
Review scores
Source	Rating
AllMusic	3/5 stars

Revenants is the second studio album by American deathcore band Conducting from the Grave. The album was released on October 25, 2010.

== Track listing ==
No.	Title	Length
1.	"And Our War Will Dawn"	4:28
2.	"The Tyrant's Throne"	3:37
3.	"Unholiest of Nightmares"	4:26
4.	"Her Poisoned Tongues"	3:47
5.	"Path of a Traitor"	4:00
6.	"Nevermore"	4:05
7.	"We Who Shall Conquer"	4:22
8.	"Curse in the Twilight"	4:52
9.	"Revenants"	3:30
10.	"What Monsters We Have Become (Pt. One)"	4:53
11.	"What Monsters We Have Become (Pt. Two)"	2:19
Total length:		44:19

== Credits ==
Conducting from the Grave

- Mikey Powell – lead vocals
- Greg Donnelly – drums
- Steven Lovas – bass guitar
- John Abernathy – guitar
- Jeff Morgan – guitar

Additional personnel

- Kevin Randleman – engineering
- Casey Sabol – engineering
- Zack Ohren – engineering, mastering, mixing
