= Annotations of an Autopsy =

British death metal band

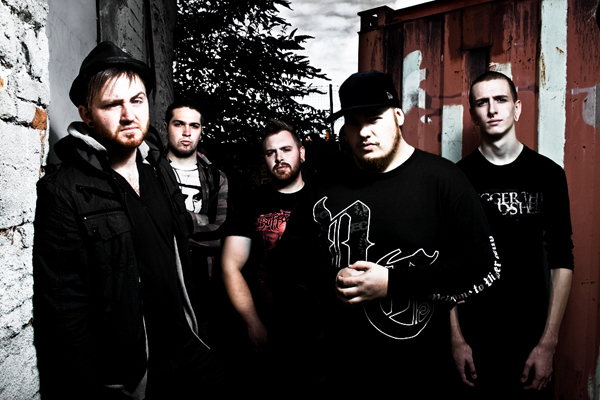
- Photographed in August 2010

Background information
- Origin: Lowestoft, Suffolk, England
- Genres: Death metal, deathcore
- Years active: 2006–2013; 2014; 2018–2019; 2025–present
- Labels: This City Is Burning, Siege of Amida, Ferret Music, Nuclear Blast
- Members: Steve Regan; Nath Applegate; Neil Hayward; Sean Mason; Al Commons
- Past members: Matt; Dan Smith; Sam Dawkins; Jamie Sweeny; Ross Davey; Don Jones; Lyn Jeffs; Sean Hynes; Brad Merry

Annotations of an Autopsy (AOAA) are an English death metal band from Lowestoft, Suffolk. They formed in 2006 and released their debut EP, Welcome to Sludge City, in 2007. After two studio albums, Before the Throne of Infection (2008) and The Reign of Darkness (2010), the band officially announced their disbandment in 2013, then reformed in 2018 with a new EP, World of Sludge (2019).

In 2021, Joe Smith-Engelhardt of Alternative Press included the album "Before the Throne of Infection" in his list of "30 deathcore albums from the 2000s that define the genre".

== History ==
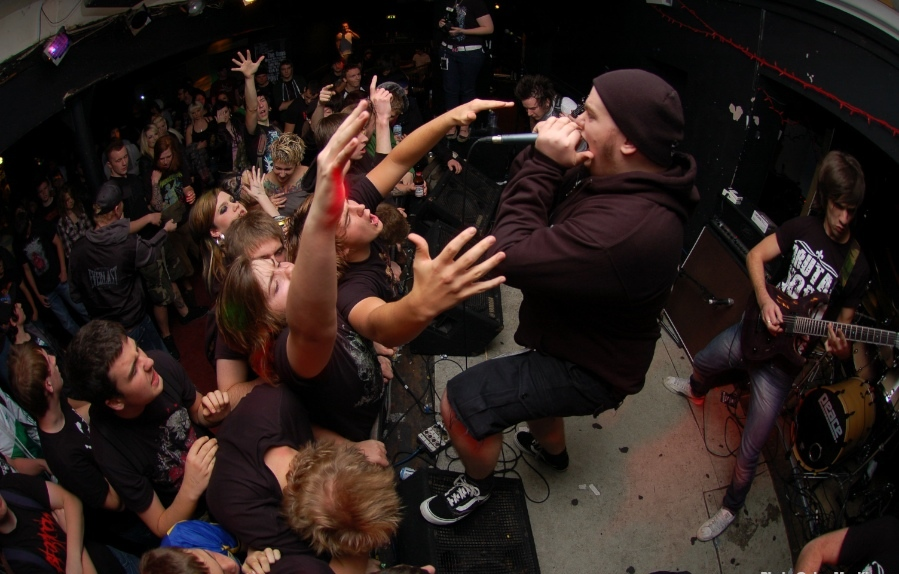
Annotations of an Autopsy performing in November 2007

The band was formed in 2006 in Lowestoft, England. That same year, they released a first demo titled Demo 2006. In 2007, the band released their debut EP, Welcome to Sludge City. In 2008, the band released their first full-length studio album, Before the Throne of Infection, which allowed them to become known beyond England and to start touring across Europe. The album was favorably received by the specialized press. To promote the album, the band performed at the Download Festival and took part in the Summer Slaughter Tour 2008, with Suicide Silence, As Blood Runs Black, Abigail Williams, Born of Osiris and The Berzerker). In August 2008, Dan Smith left Annotations of an Autopsy and was replaced by Lyn Jeffs from Ingested.

In March 2009, the band signed to Nuclear Blast, and in July, they began recording their next album in Foel Studio, known for working with bands like Napalm Death and Electric Wizard. Later that month and in August, they headlined the European Dominatour, supporting Trigger the Bloodshed, Viatrophy and Burning Skies. 2009 also saw a lineup change; Ross Davey left Annotations of an Autopsy in March, followed by Lyn Jeffs in September. The new members were Nath Applegate (bass) and Brad Merry (drums).

In January 2010, the band released their second album, entitled II: The Reign of Darkness, with its title and cover art revealed in October 2009. Released on January 22, with streaming becoming available a week earlier, the album benefited from a promotion much superior to that of its predecessor. Music videos were made for the songs "Bone Crown" and "Stage Breaker", the latter from the band's 2011 EP Dark Days. Before the recording of Dark Days, more lineup changes occurred in 2010; guitarist Sam Dawkins left to focus on his personal life, followed by drummer Brad Merry due to disagreements and living far away from the rest of the band. They were replaced by Don Jones and Neil Hayward, respectively.

In March 2012, the group went on a European tour with My Autumn, Frontside and Drown My Day in Europe. In April, the band announced that they would be going on indefinite hiatus after performing several more festivals and local concerts, the last one in early 2013.

During their hiatus, Annotations of an Autopsy was only active for occasional reunions and an EP released in 2019 titled World of Sludge. In 2025, it was announced that the band reformed and will participate in the Slaughter to Prevail "Grizzly Winter" tour along with Suicide Silence and Dying Fetus, planning to perform the entire Welcome to Sludge City EP on each date, although the track 'Serpents' was absent from the setlist, and the songs 'World of Sludge' and 'Prosthetic Erection' were also played.

== Musical style and influences ==
Annotations of an Autopsy and its material have been described as death metal, deathcore, grindcore, and hardcore punk.

== Members ==
Current

- Steve Regan – vocals (2006–present)
- Nath Applegate – bass (2009–present)
- Neil Hayward – drums (2010–present)
- Sean Mason – guitars (2011–present)
- Al Commons – guitars (2018–present)

Former

- Matt – bass (2006–2007)
- Al Clayton — guitars (2006–2008)
- Dan Smith – drums (2006–2008)
- Sam Dawkins – guitars (2008–2010)
- Jamie Sweeny – guitars (2006–2011)
- Ross Davey – bass (2007–2009)
- Don Jones – guitars (2007 (session member), 2010–2013)
- Lyn Jeffs – drums (2008–2009)
- Sean Hynes – bass (2009)
- Brad Merry – drums (2009–2010)

== Discography ==
=== Studio albums ===
- Before the Throne of Infection (14 April 2008)
- II: The Reign of Darkness (22 January 2010)

=== EPs ===
- Welcome to Sludge City (4 June 2007)
- Dark Days (18 July 2011)
- World of Sludge (6 June 2019)

=== Music videos ===
- "Bone Crown" (2010)
- "Stage Breaker" (2011)
- "Buried in a Bad Rep" (2012)
