= Grizzly (album) =

Studio album by Slaughter to Prevail
- Released: 18 July 2025
- Recorded: 2022–2025
- Genres: Deathcore; nu metal
- Length: 50:08
- Labels: Sumerian; Osuma
- Producer: Aleksandr Shikolai

Slaughter to Prevail chronology
Kostolom (2021)	Grizzly (2025)

Singles from Grizzly
- 1. "1984" Released: 9 August 2022; 2. "Viking" Released: 28 July 2023; 3. "Conflict" Released: 28 February 2024; 4. "Kid of Darkness" Released: 24 May 2024; 5. "Behelit" Released: 15 October 2024; 6. "Russian Grizzly in America" Released: 23 April 2025; 7. "Song 3" Released: 28 May 2025

Professional ratings
Review scores
Source	Rating
Metal Hammer	4/5

Grizzly is the third studio album by Russian deathcore band Slaughter to Prevail. It was released on 18 July 2025 by Osuma Music in Russia and by Sumerian Records in the United States.

== Background ==
On 26 February 2022, Slaughter to Prevail released a statement on Facebook condemning the Russian invasion of Ukraine which began two days earlier. Alex Terrible issued another statement on behalf of the band via Instagram and YouTube on 1 March, also urging viewers to "not make the whole Russian people an accomplice". In May, due to the sanctions, as well as an interest in the American metal scene, the band temporarily moved to Orlando, Florida. On 9 August, they released the song "1984", inspired by the George Orwell novel of the same name, in protest of the government and the war.

On 28 July 2023, Slaughter to Prevail released the single "Viking", which was followed by another single, "Conflict", released on 28 February 2024. On 24 May 2024, the band released the single "Kid of Darkness", and on 15 October, they released "Behelit", with these songs set to appear on the band's upcoming third studio album Grizzly. On 23 April 2025, the band released the single "Russian Grizzly in America" and revealed that their new album would be released on 18 July. On 28 May, they released "Song 3" and its accompanying music video in collaboration with Japanese band Babymetal.

== Track listing ==
All lyrics are written by Aleksandr Shikolai; "Song 3" lyrics written with Key Kobayashi; all music is composed by Shikolai and Jack Simmons, with additional composers noted.

Grizzly track listing
No.	Title	Music	Length
1.	"Banditos"		4:53
2.	"Russian Grizzly in America"	Nikita Korzhov	4:14
3.	"Imdead" (featuring Ronnie Radke)		3:49
4.	"Babayka"		3:58
5.	"Viking"		4:31
6.	"Koschei"		3:05
7.	"Song 3" (featuring Babymetal)	Kobayashi; Korzhov	3:34
8.	"Lift That Shit"		3:06
9.	"Behelit"	Korzhov	4:09
10.	"Rodina"	Egor Krotov	4:30
11.	"Conflict"		2:22
12.	"Kid of Darkness"		4:23
13.	"1984"		3:34
Total length:			50:08

== Personnel ==
Credits adapted from Tidal.

=== Slaughter to Prevail ===
- Alex Terrible – vocals
- Jack Simmons – lead guitar
- Dmitry Mamedov – rhythm guitar
- Mike Petrov – bass
- Evgeny Novikov – drums

=== Additional musicians ===
- Francesco Ferrini – orchestration (1, 9)
- Ronnie Radke – vocals (3)
- Babymetal – vocals (7)

=== Production ===
- Alex Terrible – production
- Egor Krotov – mixing (tracks 1–10)
- Ivan Panferov – mixing (11–13)
- Ted Jensen – mastering

== Charts ==
Chart performance for Grizzly
Chart (2025)	Peak position
Australian Albums (ARIA)	64
Austrian Albums (Ö3 Austria)	56
Belgian Albums (Ultratop Flanders)	145
French Rock & Metal Albums (SNEP)	12
Scottish Albums (Official Charts)	99
UK Album Downloads (Official Charts)	32
UK Independent Albums (Official Charts)	22
UK Rock & Metal Albums (Official Charts)	7
US Billboard Top Hard Rock Albums	8
