= Slaughter to Prevail =

Russian deathcore band

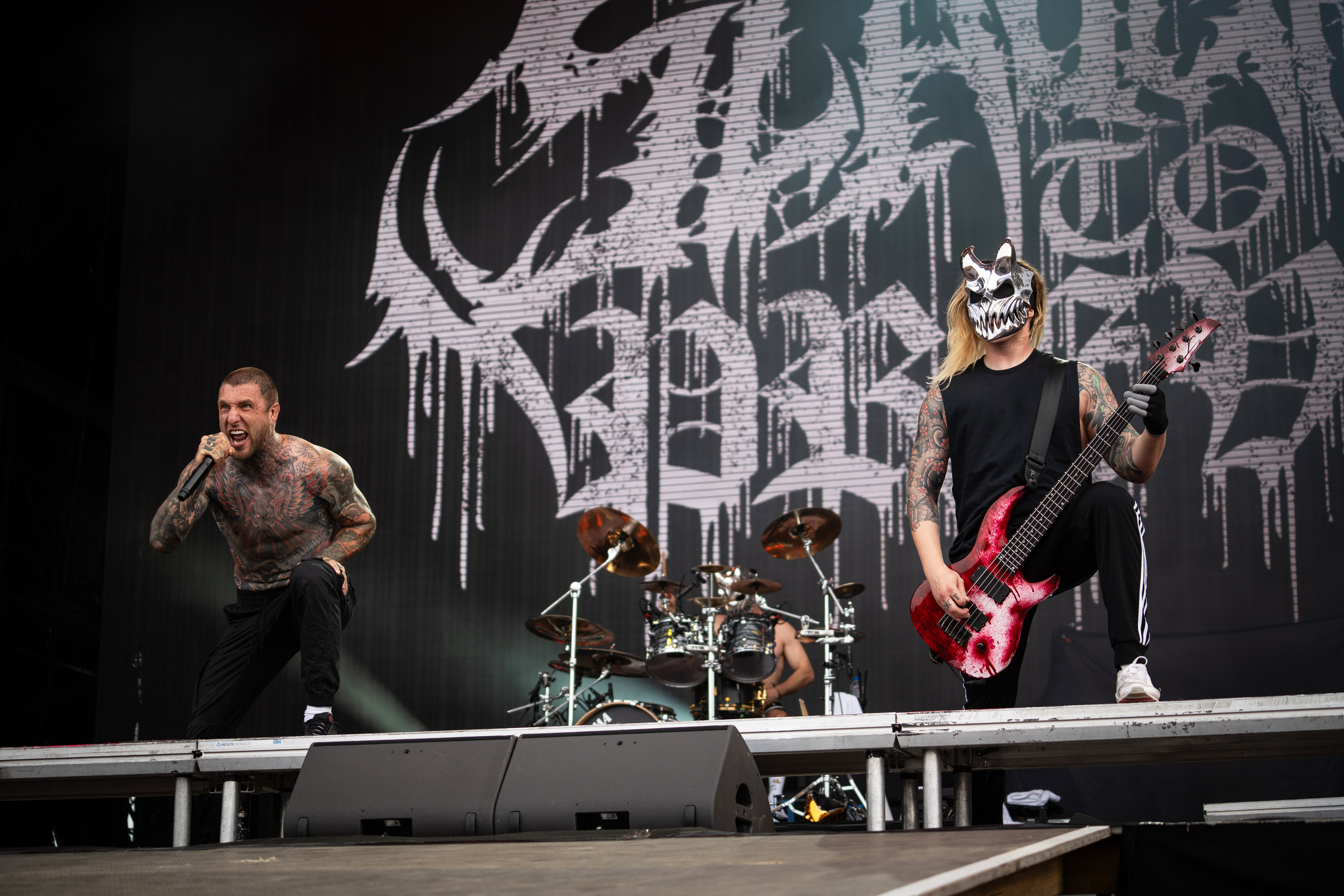
- Slaughter to Prevail performing at Hellfest in 2024

Background information
- Origin: Yekaterinburg, Russia
- Genres: Deathcore; nu metalcore
- Years active: 2014–present
- Label: Sumerian
- Members: Aleksandr Shikolai; Jack Simmons; Mike Petrov; Evgeny Novikov; Dmitry Mamedov
- Past members: Anton Poddyachy; Maxim Zadorin; Slava Antonenko; Filipp Kucheryavyh; Sam Baker; Justin Czubas; Jared Delgado; Robert Brown
- Website: slaughtertoprevail.com

Slaughter to Prevail is a Russian-American deathcore band formed in 2014 in Yekaterinburg and currently based in Orlando, Florida, United States. The band has had numerous line-up changes over the years, with Russian vocalist Aleksandr "Alex Terrible" Shikolai and British lead guitarist Jack Simmons as the only constant members. The current line-up features Russian musicians with bassist Mikhail Petrov, drummer Evgeny Novikov, and rhythm guitarist Dmitry Mamedov.

The band debuted with the EP Chapters of Misery in 2015, followed by the full-length and first studio album Misery Sermon in 2017. Their second studio album, Kostolom, was released in 2021. And their most recent and third studio album, Grizzly, was released July 18, 2025. They are signed to Sumerian Records and have toured throughout the Americas, Europe, and Asia.

== History ==
=== 2014–2017: Chapters of Misery and Misery Sermon ===
Jack Simmons was a member of London-based deathcore act Acrania, while Aleksandr "Alex Terrible" Shikolai had gained a cult following online for his vocal covers on YouTube. Terrible was also a member of the Russian deathcore act We Are Obscurity, which disbanded after failing to find a record label. Former We Are Obscurity members Maxim Zadorin (guitar) and Anton Poddyachy (drums) later became part of the initial lineup of Slaughter to Prevail, along with Slava Antonenko (guitar) and Filipp Kucheryavyh (bass). Zadorin left the band very early on and was replaced by his former We Are Obscurity bandmate Dimmitry Mamedov.

Slaughter to Prevail released an EP titled Chapters of Misery in 2015. The EP's underground success led to them being signed to Sumerian Records in 2016. Chapters of Misery was re-released under Sumerian Records in 2016. The re-release included a new song called "As the Vultures Circle". In May 2016, it was announced that Slaughter to Prevail would be joining bands such as Cannibal Corpse for Summer Slaughter 2016. Dimitry Mamedov left the band before Sumerian Records signed them, and was replaced by Simmons' former bandmate in Acrania Sam Baker. Baker only stayed in the band for a year, however, and after his departure the band scaled down to only having two guitar players. Original bassist Filipp Kucheryavyh also left the band a year later and was replaced by former My Autumn bassist Mikhail Petrov.

The band released their first full-length album, Misery Sermon, in 2017. According to the band, Misery Sermon was inspired by the hate and misery within themselves and around them.

Slaughter to Prevail was once again invited to perform at Summer Slaughter 2017 alongside bands such as The Black Dahlia Murder and Dying Fetus but was ultimately unable to make the tour due to visa issues. Slaughter to Prevail was also invited to join Suicide Silence on their 10th anniversary tour of their album The Cleansing and was set to perform in the USA and Canada in November and December 2017. However, the band encountered visa issues due to the American visa freeze for Russians.

During the Misery Sermon cycle, Jack Simmons began a hiatus from touring with the band. He would carry on as a studio-only member, with The Hopewell Furnace guitarist Jared Delgado taking his place on stage.

=== 2018–2021: Kostolom ===
In 2018, Whitechapel invited Slaughter to Prevail to join their Ten Years of Exile tour alongside Chelsea Grin and Oceano. Jared Delgado stopped working with the band during this period, being replaced by So This Is Suffering guitarist Robert Brown. Original drummer Anton Poddyachy also decided to leave the band in 2018, being replaced by Katalepsy drummer Evgeny Novikov.

The band released the singles "Agony" and "Demolisher" in 2019 and 2020 respectively to widespread popularity, with Metal Injection stating "The release of 'Demolisher' was an event in the deathcore community. Countless Youtube reaction videos lauded the impossibly deep growls and brutal instrumentation." Jack Simmons also decided to come out of his hiatus, taking part in the public-facing activities of the band for the first time since 2017.

In 2021, the band released another single, "Baba Yaga", named after a being from Slavic folklore. The song was elected by Loudwire as the third best metal song of 2021. The band released another single, "Zavali Ebalo". Their second full-length album, Kostolom (English: "Bonebreaker"), was released on 13 August 2021, and included the four singles. Former guitarist Dimitry Mamedov also returned to the band during this time.

In an interview on 30 November 2021, Terrible expressed dissatisfaction with the band's deal with Sumerian Records, attributing it to being "in a fool's paradise" when they started, and to signing without legal advisors. He said the band would likely sue to terminate their contract and continue independently, but "the issue is pending right now". Ultimately, the band decided to stay with Sumerian Records.

=== 2022–present: Grizzly ===
On 26 February 2022, the band released a statement on Facebook condemning the Russian invasion of Ukraine which began two days earlier. Terrible issued another statement on behalf of the band via Instagram and YouTube on 1 March, also urging viewers to "not make the whole Russian people an accomplice". In May, due to the sanctions, as well as an interest in the American metal scene, the band temporarily moved to Orlando, Florida. On August 9, they released the song "1984", inspired by the George Orwell novel of the same name, in protest of the government and of the war.

On 28 July 2023, the band released the single "Viking", which was followed by another single, "Conflict", released on 28 February 2024. On 24 May 2024, the band released the single "Kid of Darkness", and on 15 October, they released "Behelit", with these songs set to appear on the band's upcoming third studio album Grizzly.

In January 2025, Terrible stated that he didn't relocate to the United States, tries to come to Russia regularly, and highlighted his plans for future concerts in Russia – as well as in the U.S. and Europe.

On 23 April 2025, the band released the single "Russian Grizzly in America" and revealed that their new album would be released on 18 July. On 28 May, they released "Song 3" and its accompanying music video in collaboration with Japanese band Babymetal. On 18 July 2025, the band released their third studio album titled Grizzly.

In early 2026, politicians in Stockholm stated that they were engaged in a bipartisan investigation into the band under suspicion of spreading Russian propaganda. Opposition city councilor Christofer Fjellner advised against the band's performance in the city.

The band are confirmed to be making an appearance at Welcome to Rockville, which will take place in Daytona Beach, Florida in May 2026.

== Style and influences ==
Slaughter to Prevail has been described mainly as deathcore, with a major focus on Terrible's extremely deep guttural vocals. Terrible has mentioned that the band has been influenced by other prominent deathcore bands such as Suicide Silence, Carnifex, Whitechapel, and I Declare War. Kostolom marked a stylistic shift, with reviewers noting influence from nu metal such as Slipknot's Iowa. Terrible also started varying his vocal style more on Kostolom, incorporating pitched screams and occasional clean vocals alongside the growls and gutturals he was known for.

Slaughter to Prevail has lyrics written in both Russian and English, with both languages often appearing in the same song.

== Band members ==
=== Current ===
- Aleksandr "Alex Terrible" Shikolai (Александр Шиколай) – lead vocals (2014–present)
- Jack Simmons – lead guitar (2014–present, studio only from 2017–2020)
- Mikhail "Mike" Petrov (Михаил Петров) – bass (2016–present)
- Evgeny Novikov (Евгений Новиков) – drums (2018–present)
- Dmitry "Dima" Mamedov (Дмитрий Мамедов) – rhythm guitar (2015, 2021–present)

=== Former ===
- Anton Poddyachy – drums (played in Lost in Alaska & We Are Obscurity) (2014–2018)
- Maxim Zadorin – rhythm guitar (ex-We Are Obscurity) (2014)
- Slava Antonenko – guitars (played in Lost in Alaska & With Ink Instead of Blood) (2014–2016)
- Filipp Kucheryavyh – bass (2014–2016)
- Sam Baker (Acrania) – guitars (2015)
- Justin Czubas – guitars (played in Lunaform & Shelia) (2018)
- Jared Delgado – guitars (played in The Hopewell Furnace) (2017–2018)
- Robert Brown – guitars (played in So This Is Suffering, Entheos) (2018–2020)

== Discography ==
=== Studio albums ===
- Misery Sermon (2017)
- Kostolom (2021)
- Grizzly (2025)

=== EPs ===
- Chapters of Misery (2015)

=== Live albums ===
- Live in Moscow (2023)

=== Singles ===
- "Crowned & Conquered" (feat. Lucas Mann of Rings of Saturn) (2014)
- "King" (2017)
- "Chronic Slaughter" (2017)
- "Agony" (2019)
- "Demolisher" (2020)
- "Baba Yaga" (2021)
- "Zavali Ebalo" (2021)
- "1984" (2022)
- "Viking" (2023)
- "Conflict" (2024)
- "K.O.D." (2024)
- "Behelit" (2024)
- "Russian Grizzly in America" (2025)
- "Song 3 (feat. Babymetal)" (2025)
