= In the Midst of Bloodied Soil =

Studio album by With Passion
- Released: March 22, 2005
- Recorded: April 26, 2004 – April 30, 2004
- Genres: Technical death metal, metalcore, melodic death metal
- Length: 33:04
- Label: Earache Records
- Producer: Zack Ohren

With Passion chronology
In the Midst of Bloodied Soil (2005)	What We See When We Shut Our Eyes (2007)

Professional ratings
Review scores
Source	Rating
AllMusic	2.5/5 stars
Blabbermouth	6.5/10
Exclaim.ca	(positive)

In the Midst of Bloodied Soil is the debut studio album by American technical death metal band With Passion.

== Track listing ==
No.	Title	Length
1.	"Trainwreck Orchestra"	5:53
2.	"The Last Scripture"	5:33
3.	"The Scorpion's Dance"	2:37
4.	"Darkness Doth Bring Mortality"	4:18
5.	"Forlorn Hope"	4:27
6.	"The Prophecies of Hellfire"	2:02
7.	"A Coniferous War"	4:11
8.	"The Theory of an Evening Sky"	4:03
Total length:		33:04

== Credits ==
With Passion

- Samuel McLeod – vocals
- Andrew Burt – guitars
- Shaun Gier – guitars
- Michael Nordeen – bass
- Brandon Guadagnolo – keyboards
- Jacob Peete – drums

Production

- Produced by With Passion and Zack Ohren
- Engineered, mixed, and mastered by Zack Ohren at Castle Ultimate Studios

Artwork

- Cover art and layout by Mario Garza
