= Conducting from the Grave (album) =

Studio album by Conducting from the Grave
- Released: October 1, 2013
- Recorded: 2013
- Studio: Castle Ultimate Studios
- Genre: Deathcore, melodic death metal, technical death metal
- Length: 43:08
- Label: Self-released
- Producer: Conducting from the Grave

Conducting from the Grave chronology
Revenants (2010)	Conducting from the Grave (2013)

Professional ratings
Review scores
Source	Rating
About.com	3.5/5 stars

Conducting from the Grave is the third and final studio album by the American deathcore band Conducting from the Grave. It is their only self-released album, since they decided to leave Sumerian Records in 2013, as well as the only one to feature clean vocals.

== Track listing ==
No.	Title	Length
1.	"Honor Guide Me!"	4:25
2.	"Lycan"	3:57
3.	"The Rise"	4:45
4.	"Signs"	4:41
5.	"The Harvest"	3:54
6.	"Into the Rabbit Hole"	4:42
7.	"Dante"	4:38
8.	"Tyrant"	4:01
9.	"The Calm Before..." (instrumental)	3:24
10.	"Monster (Part III)"	4:41
Total length:		43:08

== Credits ==
Conducting from the Grave

- Mikey Powell – lead vocals
- Greg Donnelly – drums
- Jackson Jordan – bass guitar
- John Abernathy – guitar
- Jeff Morgan – guitar

Additional personnel

- Jacob Durrett – guitar tracking
- Zack Ohren – engineering, mastering, mixing
- Mikey Powell – vocal tracking, processing
