= Maniacal Miscreation =

Studio album by Cerebral Bore
- Released: 4 April 2011 (Europe), 7 June 2011 (North America)
- Recorded: April 2010 – July 2010 at Foel Studios, Wales, UK.
- Genre: death metal
- Length: 32:21
- Label: Earache
- Producer: Chris Fielding and Cerebral Bore

Maniacal Miscreation is the debut album by the Scottish death metal band Cerebral Bore. It was recorded in Foel Studios with producer Chris Fielding and released on 11 April 2011 through Earache Records. A music video for "Maniacal Miscreation", filmed at Upwood Military Base in Peterborough, U.K. with director Phil Berridge was released on 11 April 2011.

Professional ratings
Review scores
Source	Rating
Allmusic	4.5/5 stars
Blabbermouth.net	8/10 stars
About.com	3/5 stars

== Track listing ==
All tracks are written by Cerebral Bore, Paul McGuire

No.	Title	Length
1.	"Epileptic Strobe Entrapment"	4:37
2.	"The Bald Cadaver"	3:20
3.	"Open Casket Priapism"	5:29
4.	"Entombed in Butchered Bodies"	3:53
5.	"Mangled Post Burial"	2:54
6.	"Flesh Reflects the Madness"	3:56
7.	"Maniacal Miscreation"	3:47
8.	"24 Year Party Dungeon"	4:25
Total length:		32:21

== Personnel ==
All information is derived from the enclosed booklet.
Cerebral Bore

- Simone "Som" Pluijmers – vocals
- Paul McGuire – guitars
- Kyle Rutherford – bass guitar
- Allan "McDibet" MacDonald – drums

Additional Musicians

- Angel Ochoa (of Cephalotripy & Disgorge) – guest vocals on "Maniacal Miscreation"

Production and artwork

- Chris Fielding – production, engineering, mixing and mastering
- Colin Mark – cover artwork
- Tom Bradfield – layout
- Sam Scott-Hunter – photography
