= Pathology (band) =

American death metal band

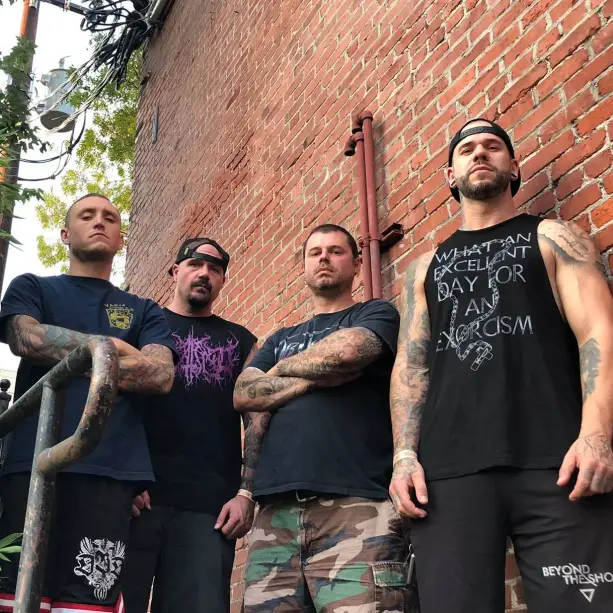
- Pathology in 2018

Background information
- Origin: San Diego, California
- Genre: Death metal
- Years active: 2006–present
- Labels: Sevared, Victory, Grindhead, Comatose, Amputated Vein, Pavement, Nuclear Blast, Agonia
- Members: Dave Astor; Kevin Schwartz; Richard Jackson; Tripp Taylor
- Past members: Tim Tiszczenko; Nick Gervais; Matti Way; Levi Fuselier; Pascual Romero; Oscar Ramirez; Obie Flett; Diego Sanchez; Jonathan Huber; Daniel Richardson; Riley McShane; Clayton Meade: Pascual Romero
- Website: pathologyband.com

Pathology is an American death metal band from San Diego, California, formed in 2006 by drummer Dave Astor (Ex member and co founder of The Locust and Cattle Decapitation). Known for their brutal and aggressive sound, the band has released several albums and gained a dedicated following within the death metal community. Their lyrics often revolve around themes of gore, violence, and medical pathology. The band's lineup has changed over the years, but they continue to create intense and uncompromising music.

== History ==
In 2006, the band released Surgically Hacked (Amputated Vein Records) which was followed by a full-length debut Incisions of Perverse Debauchery (Grindhead Records) and then Age of Onset (Comatose Records, 2009), the album which led to a contract with Victory Records where the acclaimed Legacy of the Ancients was released on July 6, 2010.

The band began extensive touring (with Nile, with Immolation, Vader, Obituary and Deicide, and with Deströyer 666, among others) but in November a horrible van accident derailed the band from continuing. At that point, the original vocalist Matti Way was replaced by Jonathan Huber (formerly of I Declare War). Guitarist Tim Tiszczenko, who at one point departed to be replaced by Kevin Schwartz, returned to form a guitar tandem with the latter. In May 2011, it was announced that Pathology would enter Lambesis Studios that summer with producer Daniel Castleman to begin working on a new full-length expected in Autumn. On August 30, the band was to start the US tour supporting Grave and Blood Red Throne.

On December 18, 2012, it was announced via the band's official site that they have fulfilled their three-album contract with Victory Records and that both original vocalist Matti Way and original guitarist Tim Tiszczenko have returned to the band. It was also announced that they will have a new album out later in 2013 on their new underground label Sevared Records. Vocalist Jonathan Huber left the band in December of that same year because Astor allegedly did not want the band to tour anymore and Huber stated that there was "no point in being in a non-touring band."

Pathology released their seventh full-length studio album Lords of Rephaim on September 3, 2013.

After a successful $4,000 Kickstarter campaign, Pathology released their eighth full-length album Throne of Reign on August 5, 2014.

On May 12, 2017, the band announced their self-titled ninth album would be released on July 21, and also released a new song from the album, "Lamentation".

On February 6, 2018, the band announced the addition of vocalist Riley McShane (from Allegaeon) and guitarist Daniel Richardson. On May 22, it was announced that McShane had departed the band and was replaced by Clayton Meade. On July 30, it was revealed Obie Flett was the band's new vocalist, who was previously in the band in 2010.

On May 24, 2019, the band announced their tenth album, Reborn to Kill, would be released on August 9.

On August 27, 2021, the band announced they had signed to Nuclear Blast and that their eleventh album, The Everlasting Plague, would be released on November 19. They also released a new song from the album, "Engaging in Homicide".

On March 26, 2024, the band announced their twelfth album, Unholy Descent, would be released on May 17, and also released a new song from the album, "Cult of the Black Triangle". In August 2024, the band announced that guitarist Daniel Richardson would be leaving for personal reasons, with Kevin Schwartz returning to the lineup, who had previously played on Awaken to the Suffering and The Time of Great Purification.

On August 4, 2026, the band announced the departure of Obie Flett, and revealed Tripp Taylor as the new vocalist of the band.

== Band members ==
Current members

- Dave Astor – drums (2006–present)
- Kevin Schwartz – guitar (2010–2012, 2024–present)
- Richard Jackson – bass (2018–present)
- Tripp Taylor – vocals (2026–present)

Former members

- Tim Tiszczenko – guitar (2006–2010, 2012–2018), bass (2006–2008, 2012–2016, 2018), vocals (2006–2008, 2008)
- Nick Gervais – guitar (2006)
- Matti Way – vocals (2008–2009, 2012–2018)
- Levi Fuselier – vocals (2008)
- Pascual Romero – vocals (2009–2010)
- Oscar Ramirez – bass (2010–2012, 2016–2018)
- Obie Flett – vocals (2010, 2018–2026)
- Diego Sanchez – guitar (2010)
- Jonathan Huber – vocals (2011–2012)
- Daniel Richardson – guitar (2018–2024)

== Discography ==
Pathology discography
- Studio albums: 12
- Singles: 2
- Music videos: 9

Studio albums

- Surgically Hacked (2006)
- Incisions of Perverse Debauchery (2008)
- Age of Onset (2009)
- Legacy of the Ancients (2010)
- Awaken to the Suffering (2011)
- The Time of Great Purification (2012)
- Lords of Rephaim (2013)
- Throne of Reign (2014)
- Pathology (2017)
- Reborn to Kill (2019)
- The Everlasting Plague (2021)
- Unholy Descent (2024)
