= Conducting from the Grave =

American deathcore band

- Origin: Sacramento, California, U.S.
- Genres: Deathcore, melodic death metal
- Years active: 2003–2005, 2007–2015
- Label: Sumerian
- Past members: John Abernathy; Greg Donnelly; Drew Winter; Jeffrey Morgan; Jackson Jordan; Lou Tanuis; Shaun Gier; Phil Williamson; Steven Lovas; Mikey Powell

Conducting from the Grave was an American deathcore band, formed in 2003 in Sacramento, California.

== History ==
Conducting from the Grave was formed in the fall of 2003, from members and ex-members of local Sacramento bands With Passion, Promising Tomorrow and others. After releasing one demo Breathe The Blackened Sky in 2004, and one EP Trials of the Forsaken in 2005, the band members decided to join the powers with the members of another project in 2005 and Conducting from the Grave ceased to exist. However, in 2007 the band came back together and in 2008 they were signed on the Sumerian Records. In 2009, they released their debut album called When Legends Become Dust. In 2010, they released the follow-up called Revenants. In 2013, they band decided to leave the Sumerian Records and started their own campaign on the Kickstarter to release their self-titled album.

== Members ==
Final line-up

- Greg Donnelly – drums (2003–2005, 2007–2015)
- Jackson Jordan – bass guitar (2011–2015)
- John Abernathy – guitar (2003–2005, 2007–2015)
- Jeff Morgan – guitar (2003–2005, 2007–2015)
- Drew Winter – vocals (2005, 2015)

Former members

- Chris Macres – vocals (2003)
- Shaun Gier – vocals (2003–2005)
- Lou Tanuis – vocals (2007–2010)
- Phil Williamson – bass guitar (2003–2005)
- Steven Lovas – bass guitar (2007–2011)
- Mikey Powell – vocals (2010–2015)

== Discography ==
Studio albums

- When Legends Become Dust (Sumerian, 2009)
- Revenants (Sumerian, 2010)
- Conducting from the Grave (Independent, 2013)

EPs

- Trials of the Forsaken (2005)
- Trials of the Forsaken 2015 (2015)

Demos

- Breathe the Blackened Sky (2004)
