= Soreption =

Swedish band

- Origin: Sweden
- Genres: Technical death metal
- Years active: 2005–present
- Labels: Unique Leader, Sumerian
- Members: Fredrik Söderberg; Tony Westermark; Rickard Persson; Ian Waye
- Past members: Mikael Almgren; Kim Lantto; Anton Svedin

Soreption is a technical death metal band from Sundsvall, Västernorrlands län, Sweden. Formed in 2005, they are best known for their fast melodies and sharp, groovy riffs. Despite the band's Swedish nationality, Metal Hammer stated the opinion that the band's "brand of death metal just doesn’t sound that Swedish at all."

They have released one EP and four full-length albums.

In 2014, after the release of their album Engineering The Void, bass player Rickard Persson left the band and was replaced by Mikael Almgren of technical metal band Terminal Function. In December 2016, guitarist Anton Svedin left the band and was replaced by current bassist Mikael Almgren. Kim Lantto of Facial Abuse and Festering Remains joined as the new bass player. In 2019, the song "A Mimic's Ignorance" appeared in the Netflix show On My Block .

In April 2022, the band announced their new album, Jord, would be released on June 10.

== Discography ==
Studio albums

- Deterioration of Minds (2010)
- Engineering the Void (2014)
- Monument of the End (2018)
- Jord (2022)

EPs

- Illuminate the Excessive (2007)

== Band members ==
Current

- Fredrik Söderberg – vocals (2005–present)
- Tony Westermark – drums (2005–present)
- Rickard Persson – bass (2005–2014, 2018–present)
- Ian Waye – guitars (2023–present; touring 2022–2023)

Former

- Mikael Almgren – guitars (2016–2021), bass (2014–2016)
- Kim Lantto – bass (2016–2018)
- Anton Svedin – guitars (2005–2016)

Former live/touring members

- Justin McKinney – guitars (2018)
