= I Declare War (band) =

American deathcore band

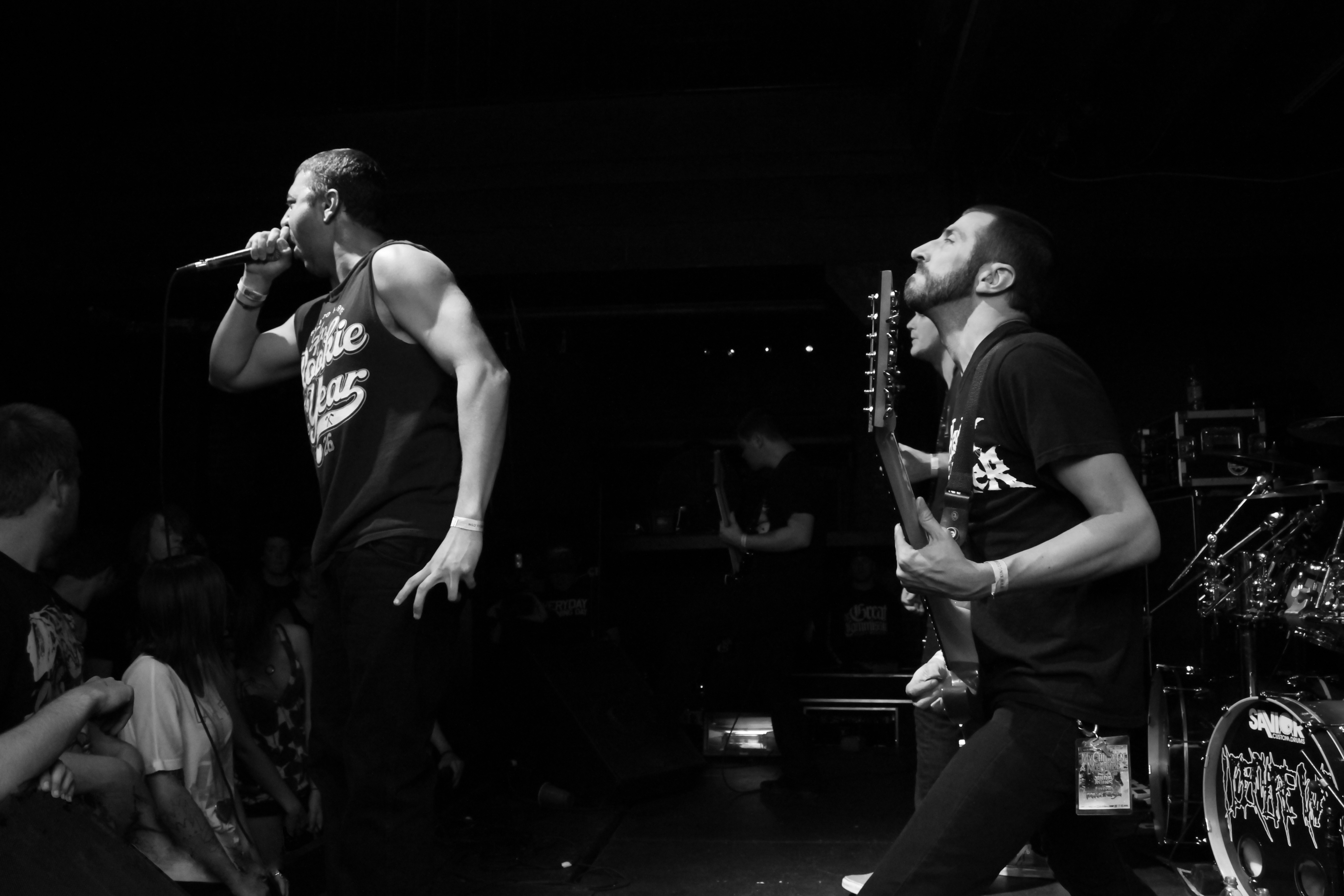
- I Declare War in 2011. From left to right: Jamie Hanks (vocals) and Evan Hughes (guitar).

Background information
- Origin: Seattle, Washington, U.S.
- Genre: Deathcore
- Years active: 2005–present
- Label: Artery
- Members: Jamie Hanks; Garon Howe; Blaine Brun
- Past members: See former members

I Declare War is an American deathcore band from Seattle, Washington.

== History ==
The band was founded in 2005. The original lineup consisted of Jonathan Huber (vocals), Evan Hughes (guitar), Jake Paulson (guitar), Randy Carpenter (drums), and Zack Ring (bass).

In 2006, the group released their first EP, the independently released What You Deserve and began touring soon after. In 2007 the band released their first full-length album and first on a record label, Amidst the Bloodshed on the now defunct Compton Records. During a tour in the same year, the group came in contact with fellow deathcore band Whitechapel and established a close friendship with them. In 2009 the band would experience its first major lineup change "with Chris Fugate stepping in to replace Paulson, Ryan Cox coming in for Carpenter, and Brent Eaton taking over for Ring." This would leave Huber and Hughes as the only original members in the band. Also in 2009, the band was contacted by the up-and-coming Artery Recordings after Whitechapel guitarist Alex Wade "was approached by Artery in regards to possible bands to sign" and recommended I Declare War.

The following year, the band released their second album, 2010's Malevolence. This would mark the group's last release to feature original vocalist, Jonathan Huber. He would leave the band in 2010 to further other ventures. Huber would then go on to join death metal outfit Pathology. The band was quick to find a replacement vocalist in Jamie Hanks. Hanks had previously been the long time vocalist of death metal band Those Who Lie Beneath. In 2011, Hanks made his first recorded appearance with the band on the group's third record, the self-titled I Declare War. This release being titled I Declare War Guitarist Evan Hughes was the only member in the band left from the original 2005 lineup. However, even this was about to change. In early 2012, the band's lineup again went through a drastic change. Every single member of the band other than their newly appointed vocalist left I Declare War. With Hanks now finding himself the senior member of the band, the group gained a new lineup in 2012. This third and current incarnation of the group consists of guitarist John Winters, drummer Colin Bradford, bassist Gordon McPherson, and vocalist Jamie Hanks. They eventually expanded to once again include a second guitarist, this one being Jacob Hansen. Later on yet again due to heavy touring Hansen and Bradford would leave and enters Yusef Johnson.

In 2014, this new lineup released its first album together, We Are Violent People by Nature, which would be I Declare War's fourth full-length album and would reach No. 13 on the Billboard Heatseekers chart. In 2016, 'Songs for the Sick' was released. An Instrumental version of the album was also made available. Later in 2016 the band recruited guitarist Greg Kirkpatrick (As Blood Runs Black) and drummer Garon Howe (Hailbrook Hollow). A year later a new music video was released for one of the songs on that album entitled, Millions will Burn. In 2018, they released a cover of the Stone Temple Pilots song Dead and Bloated.

In October of 2019, I Declare War released a five song EP entitled Downcast. It was recorded in Seattle, WA at Thunderbeast studios and mixed and mastered by Aaron Kitcher. It is the first body of music to feature drummer Garon Howe and guitarist Greg Kirkpatrick. It also features lyrics written by Howe on the track entitled Hypothermic. A sequel to the EP, Downcast Vol. 2, was released on November 19, 2024.

== Band members ==
Current

- Jamie Hanks – lead vocals (2010–present)
- Garon Howe – drums (2016–present)
- Blaine Brun – guitars (2023–present), bass (2023–present)

Former

- Jake Paulson – guitars (2005–2008)
- Randy Carpenter – drums (2005–2008)
- Zack Ring – bass (2005–2009)
- Jonathan Huber – lead vocals (2005–2010)
- Chris Fugate – guitars (2009–2011)
- Evan Hughes – guitars (2005–2012)
- Ryan Cox – drums (2009–2012)
- Jacob Hansen – guitars (2012–2014)
- Gordon McPherson – bass (2011–2015)
- Brent Eaton – bass (2009–2011, 2016)
- Joe Garcia – drums (2014–2016)
- Yusef Johnson – guitars (2014–2016)
- John Winters – guitars (2012–2023) bass (2016–2023)

Timeline

== Discography ==
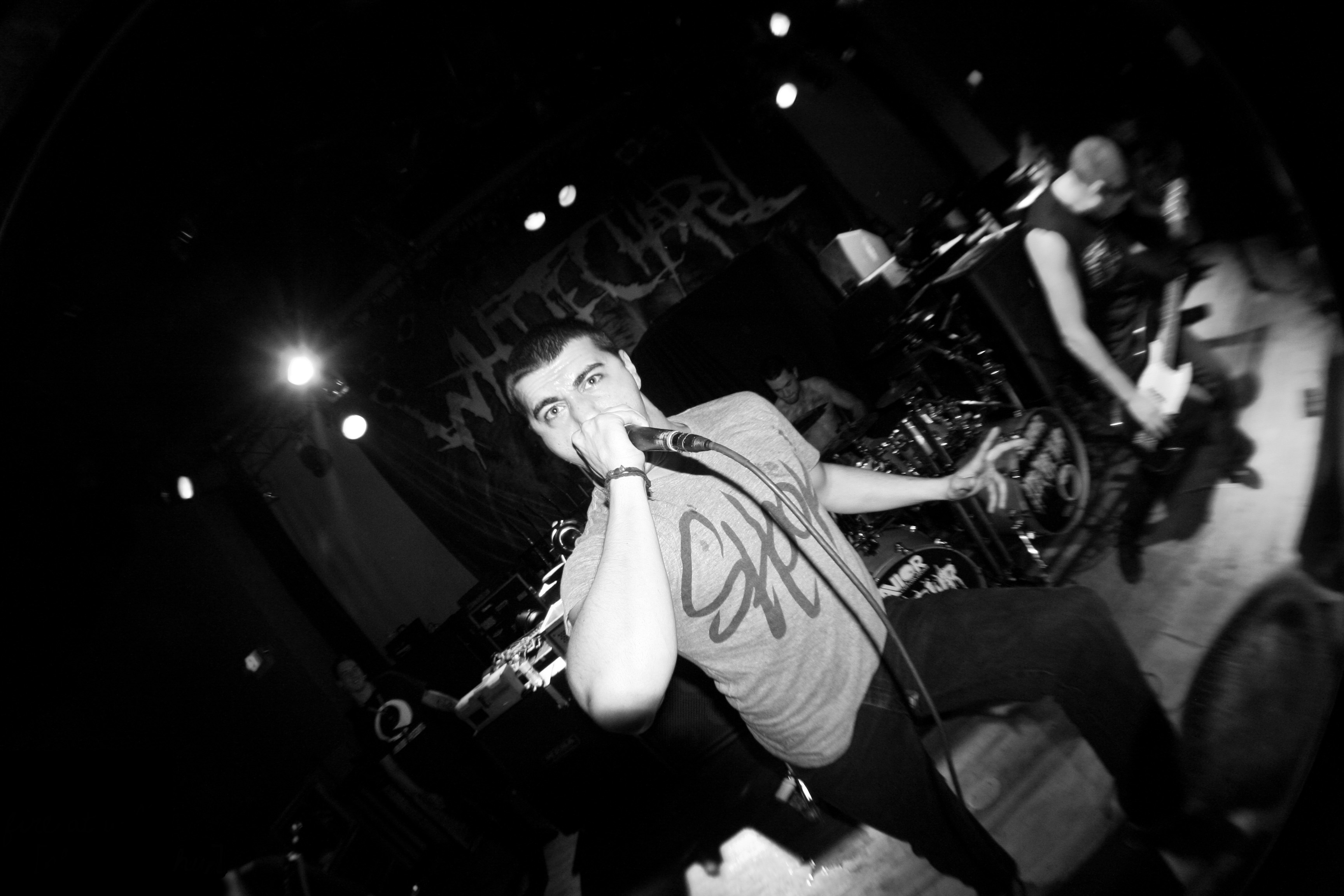
I Declare War in 2011

Albums

- 2007: Amidst the Bloodshed (album, Compton Records)
- 2010: Malevolence (album, Artery Recordings)
- 2011: I Declare War (album, Artery Recordings) U.S. Heatseekers #16
- 2014: We Are Violent People by Nature (album, Artery Recordings) U.S. Heatseekers #13
- 2016: Songs for the Sick (album, self-released)

Other

- 2006: What You Deserve (EP, self-released)
- 2007: Bring the Season (Christmas-themed EP, Compton Records)
- 2019: Downcast (EP, self-released)
- 2024: Downcast Vol. 2 (EP, self-released)
